= List of Department of Defense appointments by Joe Biden =

President Biden will make many appointments and nominations to serve in various roles in the Department of Defense. These include the Army, Navy, Marines, and Air Force. Almost all of these nominations will need to be confirmed by the United States Senate before they can begin service. As was the case with Lloyd Austin, a waiver is required if the nominated person has not been out of service for at least seven years.

Below is a list of nominations and appointments to the Department of Defense by Joe Biden, the 46th president of the United States. As of August 1, 2024, according to tracking by The Washington Post and Partnership for Public Service, 50 nominees have been confirmed, 3 nominees are being considered by the Senate, 10 positions do not have nominees, and 4 appointments have been made to positions that don't require Senate confirmation.

== Color key ==
Denotes appointees awaiting Senate confirmation.

Denotes appointees serving in an acting capacity.

Denotes appointees who have left office or offices which have been disbanded.

== Department of Defense ==
=== Office of the Secretary of Defense ===
Office	Nominee	Assumed office	Left office
— Secretary of Defense	Lloyd Austin	January 22, 2021 (Confirmed January 22, 2021, 93–2)	—
— Deputy Secretary of Defense	Kathleen Hicks	February 9, 2021 (Confirmed February 8, 2021 by voice vote)	—
— Assistant to the Secretary of Defense for Public Affairs	Chris Meagher	September 9, 2022	—
— Assistant to the Secretary of Defense for Public Affairs	John Kirby	January 20, 2021	May 27, 2022; Appointed to the National Security Council as coordinator for strategic communications
— Department of Defense Press Secretary	Patrick S. Ryder	August 4, 2022	—
— Chief of Staff to the Secretary of Defense	Derek Chollet	July 19, 2024	—
— Chief of Staff to the Secretary of Defense	Kelly Magsamen	January 20, 2021	June 28, 2024
— Director of Administration and Management	Michael B. Donley	May 5, 2021	September 18, 2023
— General Counsel of Defense	Caroline D. Krass	August 2, 2021 (Confirmed July 22, 2021 by voice vote)	—
— Chief Information Officer of Defense
— Chief Information Officer of Defense	Leslie Beavers	July 1, 2024	—
— Chief Information Officer of Defense	John Sherman	December 17, 2021 (Confirmed December 14, 2021 by voice vote)	June 28, 2024
— Assistant Secretary of Defense (Legislative Affairs)	Rheanne Wirkkala	December 2, 2022 (Confirmed November 17, 2022 by voice vote)	—
— Inspector General of Defense	Robert Storch	December 6, 2022 (Confirmed November 30, 2022, 92–3)	—

=== Joint Chiefs of Staff ===
Office	Nominee	Assumed office	Left office
— Chairman of the Joint Chiefs of Staff	Charles Q. Brown Jr.	October 1, 2023 (Confirmed September 20, 2023, 83–11)	—
— Vice Chairman of the Joint Chiefs of Staff	Christopher W. Grady	December 20, 2021 (Confirmed December 16, 2021 by voice vote)	—
— Chief of Staff of the Army	Randy A. George	September 21, 2023 (Confirmed September 21, 2023, 96–1)	—
— Commandant of the Marine Corps	Eric M. Smith	September 22, 2023 (Confirmed September 21, 2023, 96–0)	—
— Chief of Naval Operations	Lisa M. Franchetti	November 2, 2023 (Confirmed November 2, 2023, 95–1)	—
— Chief of Staff of the Air Force	David W. Allvin	November 2, 2023 (Confirmed November 2, 2023, 95–1)	—
— Chief of Space Operations	B. Chance Saltzman	November 2, 2022 (Confirmed September 29, 2022 by voice vote)	—
— Chief of the National Guard Bureau	Steven Nordhaus	October 2, 2024 (Confirmed September 24, 2024 by voice vote)	—

=== Office of the Under Secretary of Defense for Policy ===
Office	Nominee	Assumed office	Left office
— Under Secretary of Defense (Policy)
— Under Secretary of Defense (Policy)	Amanda J. Dory	April 27, 2024	—
— Under Secretary of Defense (Policy)	Sasha Baker	July 18, 2023	April 26, 2024
— Under Secretary of Defense (Policy)	Colin Kahl	April 28, 2021 (Confirmed April 27, 2021, 49–45)	July 17, 2023
— Deputy Under Secretary of Defense (Policy)
— Deputy Under Secretary of Defense (Policy)	Cara L. Abercrombie	May 29, 2024	—
— Deputy Under Secretary of Defense (Policy)	Melissa Dalton	April 26, 2024	May 29, 2024
— Deputy Under Secretary of Defense (Policy)	Sasha Baker	February 14, 2022 (Confirmed February 9, 2022, 75–21)	April 26, 2024
— Assistant Secretary of Defense (Cyber Policy)	Michael Sulmeyer	August 6, 2024 (Confirmed August 1, 2024 by voice vote)	—
— Assistant Secretary of Defense (Homeland Defense and Hemispheric Affairs)
— Assistant Secretary of Defense (Homeland Defense and Hemispheric Affairs)	Rebecca Zimmerman	May 29, 2024	—
— Assistant Secretary of Defense (Homeland Defense and Hemispheric Affairs)	Melissa Dalton	March 4, 2022 (Confirmed March 1, 2022 by voice vote)	May 29, 2024
— Assistant Secretary of Defense (Indo-Pacific Security Affairs)	Ely Ratner	July 25, 2021 (Confirmed July 22, 2021 by voice vote)	—
— Assistant Secretary of Defense (International Security Affairs)	Celeste Wallander	February 22, 2022 (Confirmed February 16, 2022, 83–13)	—
— Assistant Secretary of Defense (Space Policy)
— Assistant Secretary of Defense (Space Policy)	John D. Hill	August 12, 2024	—
— Assistant Secretary of Defense (Space Policy)	Vipin Narang	May 20, 2024	August 12, 2024
— Assistant Secretary of Defense (Space Policy)	John F. Plumb	March 7, 2022 (Confirmed March 1, 2022 by voice vote)	May 20, 2024
— Assistant Secretary of Defense (Special Operations and Low-Intensity Conflict)	Christopher Maier	August 12, 2021 (Confirmed August 7, 2021 by voice vote)	—
— Assistant Secretary of Defense (Strategy, Plans, and Capabilities)
— Assistant Secretary of Defense (Strategy, Plans, and Capabilities)	Madeline Mortelmans	December 20, 2023	—
— Assistant Secretary of Defense (Strategy, Plans, and Capabilities)	Mara Karlin	August 17, 2021 (Confirmed August 9, 2021 by voice vote)	December 20, 2023

=== Office of the Under Secretary of Defense (Comptroller) ===
Office	Nominee	Assumed office	Left office
— Under Secretary of Defense (Comptroller); Chief Financial Officer of Defense	Michael J. McCord	June 2, 2021 (Confirmed May 28, 2021 by voice vote)	—
— Principal Deputy Under Secretary of Defense (Comptroller)	Kathleen Miller	August 20, 2021 (Confirmed August 6, 2021 by voice vote)	—

=== Office of the Under Secretary of Defense for Acquisition and Sustainment ===
Office	Nominee	Assumed office	Left office
— Under Secretary of Defense (Acquisition and Sustainment)	William A. LaPlante	April 15, 2022 (Confirmed April 7, 2022 by voice vote)	—
— Deputy Under Secretary of Defense (Acquisition and Sustainment)
— Deputy Under Secretary of Defense (Acquisition and Sustainment)	Deborah Rosenblum	April 8, 2024	—
— Deputy Under Secretary of Defense (Acquisition and Sustainment)	Radha Iyengar Plumb	April 21, 2023 (Confirmed April 18, 2023, 68–30)	April 8, 2024
— Assistant Secretary of Defense (Acquisition)	Cara L. Abercrombie	March 5, 2024 (Confirmed February 27, 2024 by voice vote)	—
— Assistant Secretary of Defense (Energy, Installations and Environment)	Brendan Owens	January 26, 2023 (Confirmed January 23, 2023, 60–35)	—
— Assistant Secretary of Defense (Industrial Base Policy)	Laura D. Taylor-Kale	April 11, 2023 (Confirmed March 30, 2023, 63–27)	—
— Assistant Secretary of Defense (Nuclear, Chemical, and Biological Defense Programs)
— Assistant Secretary of Defense (Nuclear, Chemical, and Biological Defense Programs)	Brandi Vann	April 8, 2024	—
— Assistant Secretary of Defense (Nuclear, Chemical, and Biological Defense Programs)	Deborah Rosenblum	August 4, 2021 (Confirmed July 29, 2021 by voice vote)	April 8, 2024
— Assistant Secretary of Defense (Sustainment)
— Assistant Secretary of Defense (Sustainment)	Steven J. Morani	September 30, 2024	—
— Assistant Secretary of Defense (Sustainment)	Christopher Lowman	June 10, 2022 (Confirmed May 18, 2022, 94–1)	September 30, 2024

=== Office of the Under Secretary of Defense for Intelligence and Security ===
Office	Nominee	Assumed office	Left office
— Under Secretary of Defense (Intelligence and Security)
— Under Secretary of Defense (Intelligence and Security)	Milancy Harris	March 1, 2024	—
— Under Secretary of Defense (Intelligence and Security)	Ronald Moultrie	June 1, 2021 (Confirmed May 28, 2021 by voice vote)	February 29, 2024
— Deputy Under Secretary of Defense (Intelligence and Security)	Milancy Harris	January 3, 2023 (Confirmed December 22, 2022 by voice vote)	March 1, 2024

=== Office of the Under Secretary of Defense for Personnel and Readiness ===
Office	Nominee	Assumed office	Left office
— Under Secretary of Defense (Personnel and Readiness)
— Under Secretary of Defense (Personnel and Readiness)	Ashish Vazirani	September 8, 2023	—
— Under Secretary of Defense (Personnel and Readiness)	Gil Cisneros	August 24, 2021 (Confirmed August 11, 2021 by voice vote)	September 8, 2023
— Deputy Under Secretary of Defense (Personnel and Readiness)	Ashish Vazirani	July 18, 2022 (Confirmed July 12, 2022, 73–21)	—
— Assistant Secretary of Defense (Health Affairs)	Lester Martínez López	March 1, 2023 (Confirmed February 16, 2023, 61–34)	October 31, 2024
— Assistant Secretary of Defense (Manpower and Reserve Affairs)	Ronald Keohane	March 13, 2024 (Confirmed March 6, 2024, 69–30)	—
— Assistant Secretary of Defense (Readiness)	Shawn Skelly	July 22, 2021 (Confirmed July 22, 2021 by voice vote)	–

=== Office of the Under Secretary of Defense for Research and Engineering ===
Office	Nominee	Assumed office	Left office
— Under Secretary of Defense (Research and Engineering)	Heidi Shyu	July 25, 2021 (Confirmed July 22, 2021 by voice vote)	—
— Deputy Under Secretary of Defense (Research and Engineering)	David A. Honey	March 1, 2022 (Confirmed February 16, 2022, 94–1)	—
— Assistant Secretary of Defense (Science and Technology)	Aprille Ericsson	March 29, 2024 (Confirmed February 28, 2024 by voice vote)	—

=== Offices & Agencies ===
Office	Nominee	Assumed office	Left office
Cost Assessment and Program Evaluation Directorate
— Director of Cost Assessment and Program Evaluation	Susanna Blume	August 5, 2021 (Confirmed July 30, 2021 by voice vote)	—
Operational Test and Evaluation Directorate
— Director of Operational Test and Evaluation	Douglas C. Schmidt	April 8, 2024 (Confirmed February 29, 2024 by voice vote)	—
— Director of Operational Test and Evaluation	Nickolas Guertin	December 20, 2021 (Confirmed December 14, 2021 by voice vote)	December 20, 2023
Permanent Joint Board on Defense
— Chair of the United States Section of the Permanent Joint Board on Defense for the United States and Canada	Melissa Dalton	October 27, 2022	—
National Reconnaissance Office
— Inspector General of the National Reconnaissance Office	Terrence Edwards	December 28, 2022 (Confirmed December 22, 2022 by voice vote)	—

== Department of the Army ==
Office	Nominee	Assumed office	Left office
— Secretary of the Army	Christine Wormuth	May 28, 2021 (Confirmed May 27, 2021 by voice vote)	—
— Under Secretary of the Army	Gabe Camarillo	February 8, 2022 (Confirmed February 2, 2022 by voice vote)	—
— General Counsel of the Army	Carrie Ricci	January 3, 2022 (Confirmed December 14, 2021 by voice vote)	—
— Assistant Secretary of the Army (Acquisition, Logistics, and Technology)	Douglas R. Bush	February 11, 2022 (Confirmed February 9, 2022, 93–2)	—
— Assistant Secretary of the Army (Civil Works)	Michael L. Connor	November 29, 2021 (Confirmed November 4, 2021, 92–5)	—
— Assistant Secretary of the Army (Financial Management and Comptroller)	Caral Spangler	August 17, 2021 (Confirmed August 9, 2021 by voice vote)	—
— Assistant Secretary of the Army (Installations, Energy and Environment)	Rachel Jacobson	April 4, 2022 (Confirmed March 15, 2022 by voice vote)	—
— Assistant Secretary of the Army (Manpower and Reserve Affairs)	Agnes Schaefer	December 23, 2022 (Confirmed December 21, 2022, 68–26)	—

== Department of the Navy ==
Office	Nominee	Assumed office	Left office
— Secretary of the Navy	Carlos Del Toro	August 9, 2021 (Confirmed August 7, 2021 by voice vote)	—
— Under Secretary of the Navy
— Under Secretary of the Navy	Thomas Mancinelli	August 20, 2024	—
— Under Secretary of the Navy	Erik Raven	April 13, 2022 (Confirmed April 7, 2022 by voice vote)	August 1, 2024
— General Counsel of the Navy	Sean Coffey	February 16, 2022 (Confirmed February 9, 2022, 79–17)	—
— Assistant Secretary of the Navy (Manpower and Reserve Affairs)	Franklin Parker	January 18, 2023 (Confirmed December 22, 2022, 70–22)	—
— Assistant Secretary of the Navy (Energy, Installations and Environment)	Meredith Berger	August 5, 2021 (Confirmed July 22, 2021 by voice vote)	—
— Assistant Secretary of the Navy (Financial Management and Comptroller)	Russell Rumbaugh	January 3, 2023 (Confirmed December 19, 2022, 80–10)	—
— Assistant Secretary of the Navy (Research, Development and Acquisition)	Nickolas Guertin	December 20, 2023 (Confirmed December 13, 2023 by voice vote)	—

== Department of the Air Force ==
Office	Nominee	Assumed office	Left office
— Secretary of the Air Force	Frank Kendall III	July 28, 2021 (Confirmed July 26, 2021 by voice vote)	—
— Under Secretary of the Air Force	Melissa Dalton	May 29, 2024 (Confirmed May 23, 2024, 56–39)	–
— Under Secretary of the Air Force	Kristyn E. Jones	March 6, 2023	May 29, 2024
— Under Secretary of the Air Force	Gina Ortiz Jones	July 26, 2021 (Confirmed July 22, 2021 by voice vote)	March 6, 2023
— General Counsel of the Air Force	Peter Beshar	March 18, 2022 (Confirmed March 10, 2022 by voice vote)	—
— Assistant Secretary of the Air Force (Acquisition, Technology and Logistics)	Andrew P. Hunter	February 7, 2022 (Confirmed February 2, 2022 by voice vote)	—
— Assistant Secretary of the Air Force (Financial Management & Comptroller)	Kristyn E. Jones	May 4, 2022 (Confirmed April 28, 2022 by voice vote)	July 10, 2024
— Assistant Secretary of the Air Force (Installations, Environment & Energy)	Ravi Chaudhary	April 7, 2023 (Confirmed March 15, 2023, 65–29)	—
— Assistant Secretary of the Air Force (Manpower & Reserve Affairs)	Alex Wagner	June 10, 2022 (Confirmed June 7, 2022, 76–21)	—
— Assistant Secretary of the Air Force (Space Acquisition and Integration)	Frank Calvelli	May 5, 2022 (Confirmed April 28, 2022 by voice vote)	—

== Withdrawn nominations ==
Office	Nominee	Announced	Withdrawn	Notes
— Under Secretary of Defense (Acquisition and Sustainment)	Michael Brown	April 2, 2021	July 20, 2021	
— Assistant Secretary of Defense (Manpower and Reserve Affairs)	Brenda Sue Fulton	April 23, 2021	September 29, 2022	
— Under Secretary of Defense (Policy)	Derek Chollet	July 25, 2023	January 3, 2025	
— Under Secretary of Defense (Intelligence and Security)	Tonya P. Wilkerson	May 2, 2024	January 3, 2025	
— Inspector General of the National Security Agency	Kristi Lane Scott	July 31, 2024	January 3, 2025	

== See also ==
- Cabinet of Joe Biden, for the vetting process undergone by top-level roles including advice and consent by the Senate
- List of executive branch 'czars' e.g. Special Advisor to the President

== Notes ==
Confirmation votes

Confirmations by roll call vote

Confirmations by voice vote
