= Defense Policy Board Advisory Committee =

US government organization

The Defense Policy Board Advisory Committee, also referred to as the Defense Policy Board (DPBAC or DPB), is a discretionary federal advisory committee to the United States Department of Defense. The objective of the DPB is to "provide independent advice and recommendations on matters concerning defense policy and national security issues."

In April 2025, Defense Secretary Pete Hegseth dismissed all members of the DOD's advisory boards, including the DPB, as part of a "zero-based" review. However, this review was not a permanent disbandment.

== Objectives and Scope ==
Excerpt of Objectives and Scope of Activities from the charter:

1. The Defense Policy Board will serve the public interest by providing the Secretary of Defense, Deputy Secretary of Defense and the Under Secretary of Defense for Policy with independent, informed advice and opinion concerning major matters of defense policy. It will focus upon long-term, enduring issues central to strategic planning for the Department of Defense and will be responsible for research and analysis of topics, long or short range, addressed to it by the Secretary of Defense, Deputy Secretary of Defense and the Under Secretary of Defense for Policy.

Announcements for upcoming meetings of the DPBAC are published in the Federal Register.

== History ==
The board was created under the Reagan Administration. Historically, the DPBAC has mostly served as a method for the Pentagon to leverage consulting expertise in the private sector. However, the DPBAC served a very powerful and influential role in foreign policy in the George W. Bush presidency.

In the early years of the Bush 43 Administration, Defense Policy Board chairman Richard Perle was an influence in the decision to go to war in Iraq. Later in the administration Jack Keane was instrumental in the implementation of the Iraq War troop surge of 2007.

On 1 July 2009, Secretary of Defense Robert M. Gates announced a new lineup that Matthew B. Stannard said offered a look at Gates' defense priorities.

On 25 November 2020, just before the Thanksgiving weekend, the first Trump administration removed at least 11 of 13 board members, including senior defense policy experts such as Henry Kissinger, Madeleine Albright and Jane Harman, leaving Paula Dobriansky and Jim Talent.

In December 2020, the first Trump administration's Department of Defense announced several replacements to the Defense Policy Board. The included a Hudson Institute analyst Michael Pillsbury as the new board chair, former National Nuclear Security Administration Administrator Lisa Gordon-Hagerty, former House Speaker Newt Gingrich, former Ambassador Thomas Carter, a historian and consultant Edward Luttwak, a retired Air Force Capt. Scott O'Grady, presidential adviser Thomas Stewart, former Rep. Randy Forbes, former Sen. Robert Smith and former Ambassador Charles Glazer. On 19 January 2021, Trump's last full day in office, Kash Patel and Anthony Tata were named to the board as well.

In a 30 January 2021 memo, newly confirmed president Biden's Secretary of Defense Lloyd Austin ordered a "zero-based" review of all the Pentagon advisory boards, and fired all members of the Pentagon advisory boards who are appointed by the DoD effective 16 February 2021. That included all members of the Defense Policy Board. In September 2021, Austin reinstated 16 advisory boards, including the Defense Policy Board.

In March 2025, a review of all DOD advisory committees was initiated by Joe Kaspar, SECDEF Hegseth's then-chief of staff. The committees were asked to justify their existence by detailing how "their advice 'benefited the DoD, the federal government, and the United States,' and how it aligns with President Donald Trump’s goals and Hegseth’s priority of 'restoring the warrior ethos.'"

On 23 April 2025, Defense Secretary Pete Hegseth dismissed all members of the DOD's advisory boards, including the DPB, as part of a "zero-based" review. The announcement stated that the disbandment was to "support the new strategic direction and policy priorities of the Department, we require fresh thinking to drive bold changes." However, this was not a permanent disbandment; new committee members were to be recommended by the committees' sponsors within 30 days.

As of May 2025, the last meeting minutes available were from June 2024.

In June 2026, Secretary Hegseth approved the appointment of former US trade representative Robert Lighthizer as chair of the re-established Defense Board, with former senator Norm Coleman as vice chair; the board consists of 13 additional individuals, including businessman Marc Andreessen, writer Michael Anton, former congressman and retired US Navy pilot Mike Garcia, venture capitalist Blake Masters, and foreign policy strategist Michael Pillsbury.

== Members of the board ==
In September 2024, the members of the now disbanded board were:

- Janine Davidson (Chair)
- Herman Bulls
- Victor Cha
- Thomas E. Donilon
- Eric S. Edelman
- Michèle Flournoy
- Richard Fontaine
- Jon M. Huntsman, Jr.
- Colin Kahl
- John "Jack" Keane
- Anja Manuel
- Michael O'Hanlon
- BJ Penn
- Susan Rice
- Rexon Ryu
- Kori Schake
- Rajiv J. Shah
- Dana Shell Smith
- H. Patrick Swygert
- Caitlin Talmadge

In June 2026, the second Trump administration's Department of Defense (also referred to as Department of War) appointed the following individuals into the board:

- Robert Lighthizer (chair)
- Norm Coleman (vice chair)
- Marc Andreessen
- Michael Anton
- Rachel Bovard
- Tom Feddo
- Mike Garcia
- Kenneth Jones
- Blake Masters
- Daniel McCarthy
- Michael Pillsbury
- Chas Richard
- Francis Sempa
- Christopher Williams
- Theo Wold
