= Elbridge Colby =

American government official (born 1979)

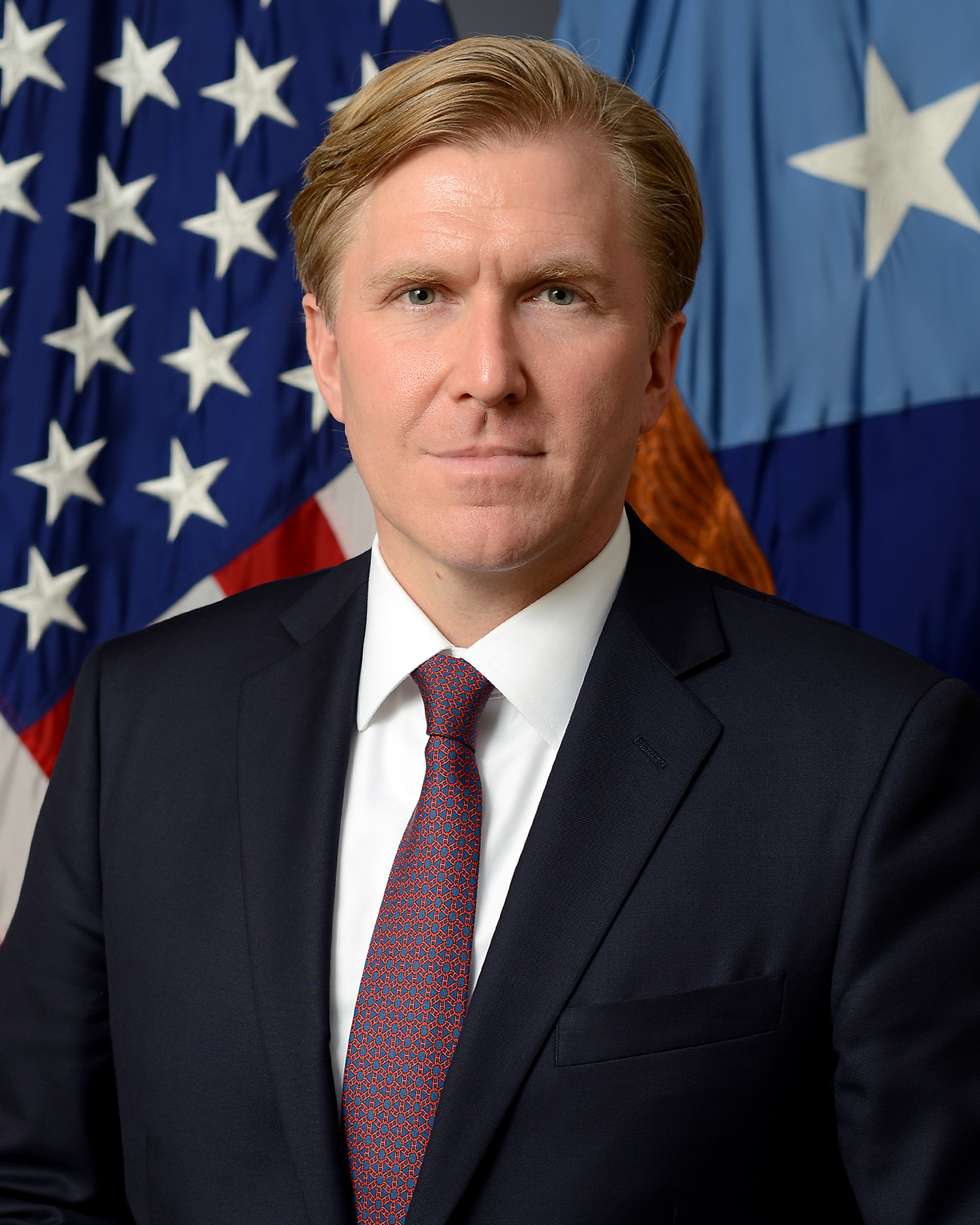
- Official portrait, 2025

Under Secretary of Defense for Policy (Note: It is also known as Under Secretary of War for Policy following President Donald Trump's 2025 executive order authorizing it as a secondary title; however, only an act of Congress can formally and legally change the name of his position.)
- Incumbent
- Assumed office April 9, 2025
- President: Donald Trump
- Preceded by: Colin Kahl

Deputy Assistant Secretary of Defense for Strategy and Force Development
- In office May 2017 – June 2018
- President: Donald Trump
- Preceded by: Position established
- Succeeded by: Position abolished

Personal details
- Born: Elbridge Andrew Colby; December 30, 1979 (age 46)
- Party: Republican
- Relatives: William Colby (grandfather)
- Education: Harvard University (BA); Yale University (JD)

Elbridge Andrew Colby (born December 30, 1979) is an American national security policy professional who is the under secretary of defense for policy since April 9, 2025. He previously served as deputy assistant secretary of defense for strategy and force development from 2017 to 2018 during the first Trump administration. He played a key role in the development of the 2018 U.S. National Defense Strategy, which, among other things, shifted the U.S. Defense Department's focus to China. He is the grandson of former CIA director William Colby.

In June 2018, Colby was appointed as director of the Defense Program at the Center for a New American Security (CNAS). In 2019, he co-founded the Marathon Initiative, a grand strategy think tank, with Wess Mitchell. In December 2024, President-elect Donald Trump nominated Colby to serve as the under secretary of defense for policy in the second Trump administration.

Identifying as a realist, Colby believes China is the principal threat faced by the United States. He believes the US should shift its military resources to Asia to prevent a Chinese takeover of Taiwan. Colby supports reducing military aid to Ukraine. During the AUKUS review in 2025, Colby worked with Australia to confirm what role it would play in a war with China over Taiwan.

== Education and early career ==
Colby moved to Tokyo in 1986 at the age of six when his father was appointed head of First Boston's Tokyo office, and he returned when he was thirteen. While in Tokyo, he attended the American School in Japan in Chōfu. Following his return to the U.S., Colby attended and graduated from Groton School (Class of 1998), where he served as editor of the school newspaper. Colby graduated from Harvard College in 2002, and from Yale Law School in 2009. His early career included over five years of service with the Department of Defense, the Department of State, and in the intelligence community, including a period of service with the Coalition Provisional Authority in Iraq in 2003. Colby also served in the Office of the Director of National Intelligence in 2005–2006.

From 2010 to 2013, Colby worked as an analyst at CNA, a federally funded nonprofit research and analysis organization. From 2014 to 2017, Colby was the Robert M. Gates fellow at the Center for a New American Security. In 2015, Colby was considered for a major position in Jeb Bush's 2016 presidential campaign, but was not hired after "prominent, interventionist neoconservatives" objected.

== First Trump administration ==
In May 2017, Colby was appointed Deputy Assistant Secretary of Defense for strategy and force development, a role in which he served into 2018. In this role, Colby was responsible for defense strategy, force development, and strategic analysis for policy for the secretary of defense. Colby served as the primary Defense Department representative in the development of the 2017 National Security Strategy.

While deputy assistant secretary, Colby served as the lead official in the development and rollout of the department's strategic planning guidance, the 2018 National Defense Strategy (NDS). The NDS posited: "Inter-state strategic competition, not terrorism, is now the primary concern in U.S. national security", and "the central challenge to U.S. prosperity and security is the reemergence of long-term strategic competition", primarily from China and Russia. Going further, Colby said the "central challenge facing the department of defense and the joint force [is] the erosion of U.S. military advantage vis a vis China and Russia." In April 2023, Politico reported that in re-orienting American defense resources away from the Middle East and towards China, Colby faced considerable bureaucratic infighting from U.S. Central Command and the Joint Staff, but received support from the Air Force and the Navy.

== Interlude ==
After leaving the Department of Defense in 2018, Colby returned to the Center for a New American Security (CNAS), where he continued to work on defense issues until 2019. Colby also worked for WestExec Advisors, a consultancy founded by Michele Flournoy and Antony Blinken. He then launched The Marathon Initiative, a think tank devoted to developing strategies for the US to compete with global rivals. In 2021, Colby expanded on his views in his first book, The Strategy of Denial: American Defense in an Age of Great Power Conflict, which The Wall Street Journal named a Ten Best Book of 2021.

== Second Trump administration ==
=== Nomination and confirmation ===
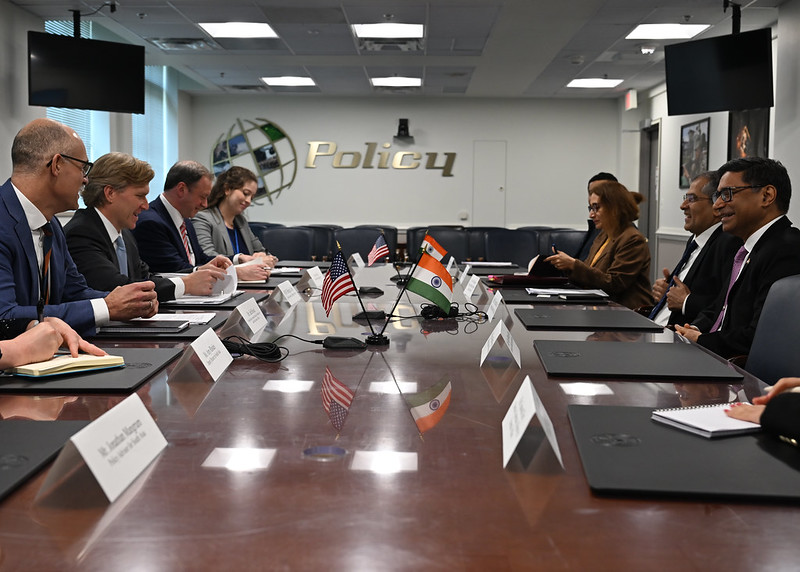
Colby with Indian Foreign Secretary Vikram Misri and Deputy National Security Advisor Pavan Kapoor in May 2025. Colby considers India to be a model ally.

On December 22, 2024, President-elect Trump nominated Colby to serve as the under secretary of defense for policy for his second term as president. Despite the support of influential MAGA figures like Vice President JD Vance and influencer Charlie Kirk, his nomination drew criticism from Republican Party defense hawks like Senator Tom Cotton regarding his past comments that Iran's acquisition of a nuclear weapon would not be an existential risk for the United States. During his hearing before the United States Senate Committee on Armed Services on March 4, 2025, Colby said he would not hesitate to advise Trump on military options to stop Iran's nuclear program if necessary. He also confirmed his intention to increase U.S. military resources in the Indo-Pacific and called on Taiwan to increase its defense budget from 2.5% of GDP to 10%. Colby's nomination was confirmed by a 54–45 Senate vote on April 8, 2025. Senator Mitch McConnell was the only Republican to oppose Colby's nomination, leading to criticism from Republicans including JD Vance and Nate Morris.

=== Tenure ===
In May 2025, Colby told British officials that the United States wanted the British Armed Forces to focus less on the Indo-Pacific and more in the Euro-Atlantic region. He also expressed concern about the UK sending the HMS Prince of Wales to the Indo-Pacific. In June 2025, Colby pushed for the Department of Defense to launch a review whether to scrap the AUKUS agreement with Australia and the United Kingdom. Colby also pushed for Japan to increase its military spending to 3.5% of its GDP, which led Japan to cancel a meeting between U.S. secretary of state Marco Rubio and U.S. defense secretary Pete Hegseth and Japanese Defense Minister Gen Nakatani and Foreign Minister Takeshi Iwaya in Washington, D.C.

You know who the hardest guy to get a hold of in the Trump administration is? The undersecretary of Defense for policy. I hope he's watching. I'm meeting with him tomorrow. Maybe he'll cancel on me. I don't know.

— Republican Senator Dan Sullivan of Alaska during a Senate Armed Services Committee held on 4 November 2025.

In early July, the US paused deliveries of various munitions to Ukraine, an initiative that reportedly originated from Colby; both Congress and the State Department were not aware of the decision. Additionally, members of the Trump administration were not consulted on the halting of the arms shipments, with Trump himself claiming to be unaware of the decision. Trump later reinstated the arms shipments within days. Afterwards, a bi-partisan group of members of Congress demanded an explanation from Colby. After the European-White House crisis meeting was held in August 2025, Trump announced the US could provide security guarantees to Ukraine as part of a peace agreement to end the Russo-Ukrainian war. Colby reportedly told representatives of European allies that the US would play a minimal role in any security guarantees. Later that month, Ukraine was denied long-range missile strikes on Russia under a "review mechanism" that had been developed by Colby.

During a Senate Armed Services Committee hearing held in November 2025, several Republican senators criticized Colby's office for failure to communicate policy with members of Congress. During the hearing to confirm Austin Dahmer as Assistant Secretary of Defense for Strategy, Plans, and Capabilities, Senator Dan Sullivan of Alaska stated "I can't even get a response, and we're on your team" claiming that it was more difficult to get a response from Colby than it was to speak with Defense Secretary Pete Hegseth or even President Trump. Sullivan added that Colby "has been really bad on this. The worst in the administration." Senator Roger Wicker of Mississippi agreed, stating that Colby's policy office had been unusually difficult about information sharing relative to other organs of the Defense Department, while Senator Tom Cotton of Arkansas characterized Colby's office as a "pigpen-like mess" regarding communication. On 5 November, the Pentagon denied Colby had been purposely withholding information from Congress. Kingsley Wilson, the Pentagon's spokesperson, stated that Colby's team had "briefed Congress dozens of times, in both classified and unclassified settings, in addition to other meetings." Reuters described the incident as a "rare bipartisan show of frustration with the administration."

In December 2025, the Financial Times reported that many within the administration of Japanese Prime Minister Sanae Takaichi felt "deep disappointment" over the lack of public support she received from Trump over remarks about defending Taiwan after she stated that a Chinese invasion of Taiwan would constitute a "survival threatening situation" to Japan and prompt a response from the Japan Self-Defense Forces. This came after Colby had been reportedly pushing Japan to take such a stance.

==== 2026 meeting with Vatican ambassador ====
In April 2026, The Free Press reported that on January 22, 2026, Colby summoned Vatican ambassador Cardinal Christophe Pierre to an "unprecedented" closed door "lecture" at the Pentagon. According to The Free Press, Colby, along with several colleagues, used the meeting to criticize Pope Leo XIV's annual "state of the world" speech given in January 2026, and told Pierre that the United States "has the military power to do whatever it wants—and that the Church had better take its side." Another official invoked the Avignon Papacy, a period during the 1300s where the French Monarchy used its military power to control the papacy.

== Political views ==
Colby identifies as a realist. He believes that China is the principal threat faced by the United States, and that Asia should be the priority of U.S. efforts and resources. He advocates for the U.S. to shift its military planning and resources to prepare for a conflict over Taiwan, and supports bolstering U.S. industrial capacity. In a Time article he co-authored with Heritage Foundation president Kevin Roberts, Colby wrote: "[W]e need to be absolutely clear: Without question, the top external threat to America is China—by far." He is a "prioritizer", believing the U.S. to have limited military resources, and thus supporting a reorientation of U.S. military resources away from the Middle East and Europe to Asia and China. Foreign Policy describes him as "the loudest and perhaps most cogent voice in Washington advocating a complete shift away from Europe, NATO, and Russia and toward the growing challenge from China".

=== East Asia ===
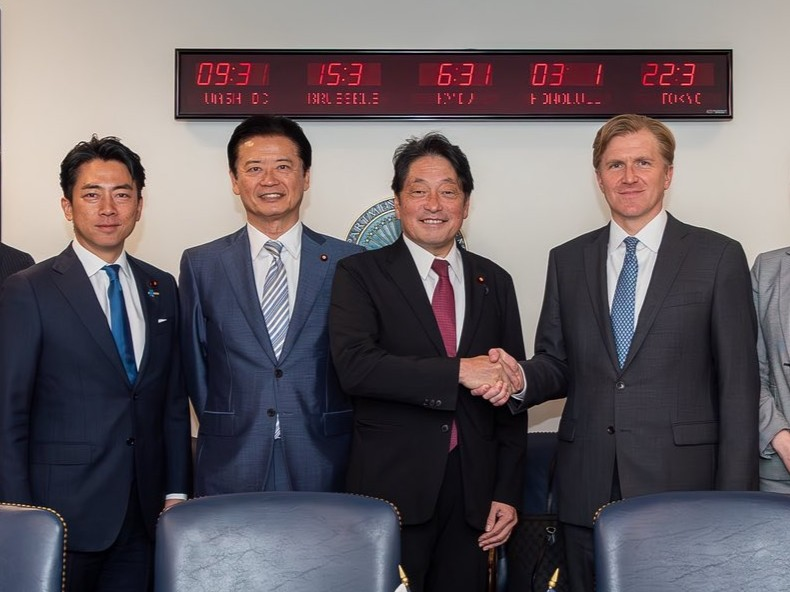
Colby with members of the Japanese Diet in April 2025

Colby believes China is seeking regional hegemony over Asia, which he believes to be the world's most important region, and will achieve that goal if not stopped by the U.S. He says that if China is allowed to dominate Asia, it would severely diminish American future prospects and freedom of action, push the U.S. economy down the value chain, and leave the U.S. less resistant to Chinese pressure. He believes the most effective way for China to achieve regional hegemony would be by attacking a U.S. ally or quasi-ally, which he identifies as Taiwan. He advocates for a "strategy of denial" to deny regional hegemony to China and stopping or defeating a potential invasion of Taiwan. He believes an attack on Taiwan would lead to a "limited war" which would seek to cause the least upheaval in the region, with no motivation on either side to escalate; he calls on the U.S. to prepare for this scenario. He further calls for an "anti-hegemonic coalition" made up of U.S. allies in Asia to stop China from taking over Taiwan; he believes that if the coalition failed to stop a takeover of Taiwan, China could seize the Philippines and Vietnam next. Colby also advocates for an end to U.S. policy of strategic ambiguity on Taiwan. He believes Taiwan should raise its military spending to 10% of its GDP and has called for the destruction of TSMC to keep it out of Chinese control should Chinese military forces capture Taiwan. While Colby believes Taiwan is important to the US, he does not consider it to be an "existential interest" and thinks the "core American interest is in denying China regional hegemony".

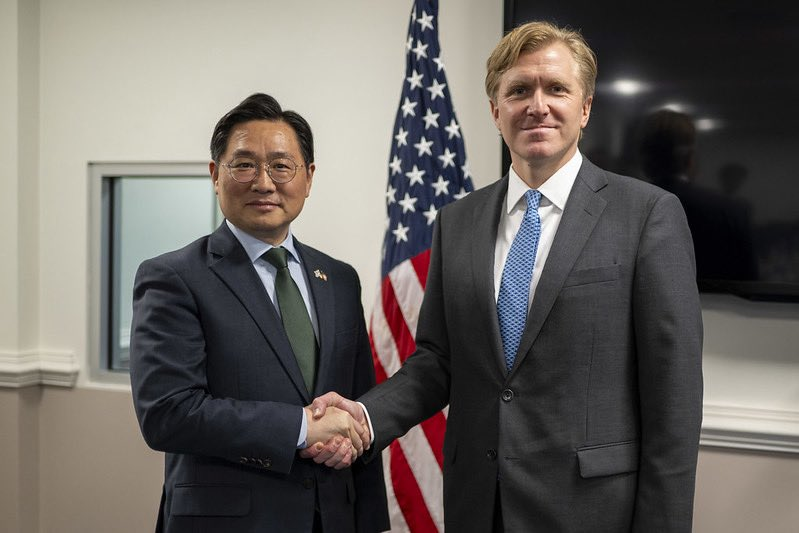
Colby with South Korean Deputy Defense Minister Cho Chang-rae in May 2025

Despite his reputation as a China hawk, Colby does not describe the Chinese Communist Party (CCP) or CCP general secretary Xi Jinping as "evil" and rejects a "cartoonish account" of China as "unstoppably rapacious", believing China to be a "rising power" with "a rational interest in expanding their sphere and believing themselves to be aggrieved and put upon". He supports treating China with respect and a "strong shield of disincentive", continuing by saying that his policy is "status quo. My strategy is not designed to suppress or humiliate China… I believe China could achieve a reasonable conception of the rejuvenation of the great Chinese nation, consistent with the achievement of my strategy. If you put all that together, that looks like somebody who is advocating for peace based on a realistic reading of the world." He also believes the U.S. should not seek to change China's internal politics or ideological system as long as China does not seek regional hegemony.

Colby supports deprioritizing North Korea, telling Yonhap News Agency in May 2024 that the "fundamental fact is that North Korea is not a primary threat to the U.S." and it "would not be rational to lose multiple American cities to just deal with North Korea". He called on South Korea to take "overwhelming responsibility" for its own defense against North Korea, with the U.S. getting involved only if China gets involved. He also said United States Forces Korea should be focused on protecting South Korea from possible Chinese attacks instead of being "held hostage to dealing with the North Korean problem". He supports transferring wartime operational control from the U.S. to South Korea, while signaling his openness to South Korea acquiring nuclear weapons. He said the denuclearization of North Korea was an "impossibly far-fetched" idea, instead calling to focus on more "attainable" goals such as arms control focused on limiting the range of North Korean intercontinental ballistic missiles. He advocates for Japan to spend more on its military, telling The Nikkei in September 2024 that Japan should spend 3% of its GDP on military.

=== Europe ===
Colby believes aiding Ukraine during the Russo-Ukrainian war jeopardizes the American focus on China. In 2023, he told Politico that "Ukraine should not be the focus. The best way to avoid war with China is to be manifestly prepared such that Beijing recognizes that an attack on Taiwan is likely to fail. We need to be a hawk to get to a place where we can be a dove. It's about a balance of power". Colby later wrote that "it is in America's interest to avoid [Ukrainian defeat], but we must pursue that interest in a manner consistent with our highest priority of restoring a formidable denial defense along Asia's first island chain."

Colby opposes Ukraine's membership in NATO. He instead supports European countries to commit more resources on countering Russia and bolstering their militaries, allowing the U.S. to shift its resources on Asia. Colby has repeatedly expressed skepticism toward AUKUS and has reacted negatively to the deployment of a UK carrier strike group to the Indo-Pacific. He believes European NATO members should spend around 3 to 4 percent of their GDP on defense and says the U.S. should be "prepared to use carrots and sticks to incentivize the right kind of behavior from our point of view" in regards to European countries.

=== Middle East ===
Colby supports a reduction of U.S. military presence in the Middle East, a region which he described as "relatively unimportant" from a geopolitical standpoint. He supports withdrawing the U.S. military from the Persian Gulf, arguing the U.S. can counter Iran "more efficiently" by "bolstering the military capabilities of its partners in the region". He opposes direct military action against Iran, while arguing that containing an Iran with nuclear weapons "is an entirely plausible and practical objective. In an article written shortly before the October 7 attacks, Colby called for a "reset" in United States–Israel relations, saying the U.S. should "defer more to Israel's judgement about how to best manage its security challenges", and that while the US should be prepared to provide material and political support to Israel, it should understand that the US., which "cannot afford to be enmeshed in another Middle Eastern war, will take a supporting role", He later questioned the Biden administration's efforts to counter the Houthis in Yemen.

== Personal life ==
Colby is married to Susana Cordeiro Guerra, former president of the Brazilian Institute of Geography and Statistics (IBGE) under the Jair Bolsonaro administration and current World Bank's vice chairwoman to Latin America. Colby is Catholic. He is the grandson of former CIA director William Colby.

== Selected publications ==
- The Strategy of Denial: American Defense in an Age of Great Power Conflict (Yale University Press, 2021)
