= Sasha Baker =

American political adviser

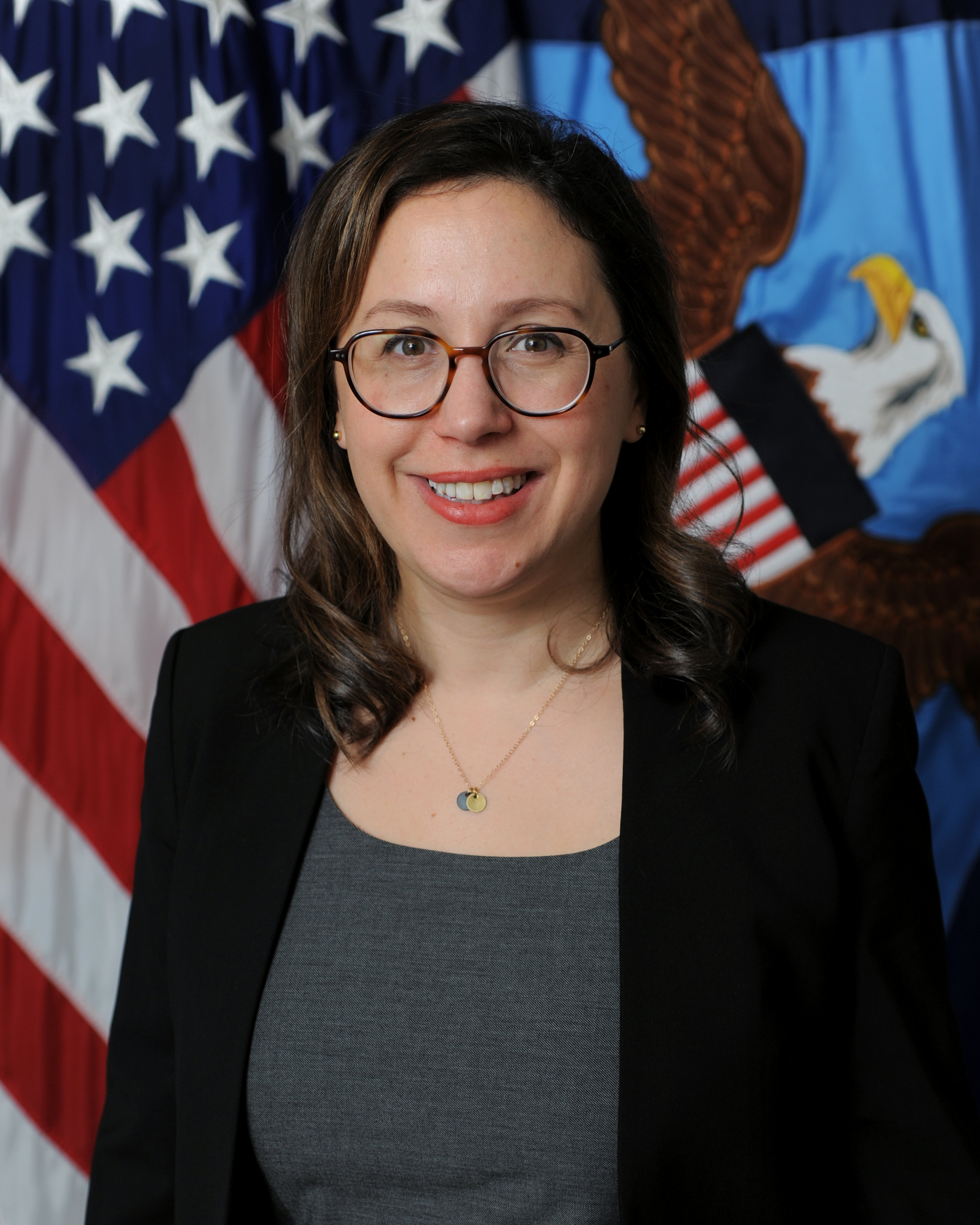
- Official portrait, 2022

Under Secretary of Defense for Policy
- Acting
- In office July 18, 2023 – April 26, 2024
- President: Joe Biden
- Preceded by: Colin Kahl
- Succeeded by: Amanda J. Dory (acting)

Deputy Under Secretary of Defense for Policy
- In office February 14, 2022 – April 26, 2024
- President: Joe Biden
- Preceded by: James Anderson
- Succeeded by: Melissa Dalton (acting)

Personal details
- Born: Alexandra Nicole Rogers New Jersey, U.S.
- Education: Dartmouth College (BA); Harvard University (MPP)
- Awards: Department of Defense Medal for Distinguished Public Service

Alexandra Nicole Baker (née Rogers), known as Sasha Baker, is an American policy advisor who served as deputy under secretary of defense for policy at the Department of Defense.

Baker previously served as special assistant to the president and senior director for strategic planning on the National Security Council. During the Obama administration, Baker served as deputy chief of staff to U.S. Defense Secretary Ashton Carter.

== Early life and education ==
Baker was born Alexandra Nicole Rogers in 1983. She grew up in the New York City suburbs of northern New Jersey. Her maternal grandparents were from Russia, and her mother, Svetlana Lisanti, came to the U.S. as a refugee.

Baker received her bachelor of arts (BA) from Dartmouth College in 2005 and a master of public policy (MPP) from the Harvard Kennedy School in 2011. After receiving her MPP, Baker became a senior fellow at the Harvard Kennedy School Belfer Center for Science and International Affairs.

== Career ==
After college, Baker worked for a consulting firm in Boston, which was not a good fit. Beginning in 2007, Baker worked as a research assistant in the Oversight and Investigations Subcommittee of the House Armed Services Committee for two years.

After gaining her master's, she worked at the Office of Management and Budget (OMB), until July 2015. She started as a program examiner in the Homeland Security division then transferred to the National Security division. Baker was later elevated to the position of special assistant to the director in the OMB. During that time she had detached duty in the Pentagon doing budget analysis. Baker was awarded the Department of Defense Medal for Distinguished Public Service in 2015.

Baker later served as deputy chief of staff to Secretary of Defense Ash Carter. According to Carter, Baker was intimately involved in Department of Defense strategy decision related to counterinsurgency against the Islamic State of Iraq and the Levant (ISIS).

In 2017, Baker joined the office of Senator Elizabeth Warren as a policy advisor on national security issues. Baker later joined Warren's 2020 presidential campaign as the candidate's chief national security advisor.

=== Biden administration ===
In January 2021, then–President-elect Joe Biden announced that Baker would be appointed senior director for strategic planning at the National Security Council. Biden would later nominate Baker to serve as deputy undersecretary of defense for policy in August 2021. On February 9, 2022, Baker was confirmed by the Senate.

== Personal life ==
In 2015, Baker married Sam Baker, a journalist and editor at POLITICO.
