= David Trachtenberg =

American security advisor

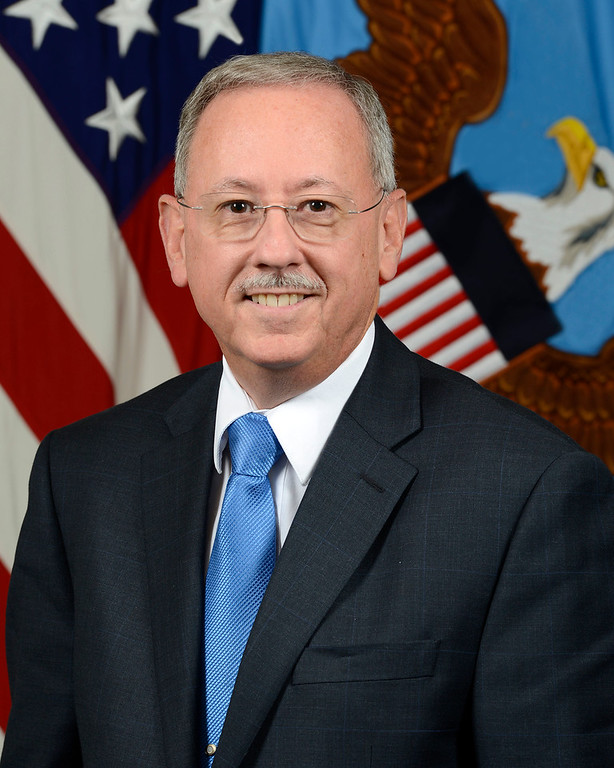

Under Secretary of Defense for Policy
- Acting
- In office October 27, 2017 – January 8, 2018
- President: Donald Trump
- Preceded by: Robert Karem (Acting)
- Succeeded by: John Rood

Principal Deputy Under Secretary of Defense for Policy
- In office October 27, 2017 – July 19, 2019
- President: Donald Trump
- Preceded by: Brian P. McKeon
- Succeeded by: James H. Anderson

Principal Deputy Assistant Secretary of Defense for International Security Policy
- In office 2001–2003
- President: George W. Bush

Personal details
- Education: University of Southern California; Georgetown University
- Awards: Department of Defense Medal for Distinguished Public Service (2003)

David Joel Trachtenberg is an American national security advisor who served as principal deputy under secretary for policy in the United States Department of Defense. He was previously the head of U.S. national security consulting firm Shortwaver. On March 17, 2017, he was announced as President Donald Trump's nominee to become principal deputy under secretary for policy in the Department of Defense. This nomination was confirmed by a 79–17 vote of the U.S. Senate on October 17, 2017.

Trachtenberg previously served as vice president and head of the strategic analysis division of CACI International Inc., the principal deputy assistant secretary of defense for international security policy at the U.S. Department of Defense, and as a senior staff member on the United States House Committee on Armed Services.

In mid-July 2019, it was announced that Trachtenburg would resign on July 19, 2019.
