= Walter B. Slocombe =

American lawyer (born 1941)

Walter Slocombe
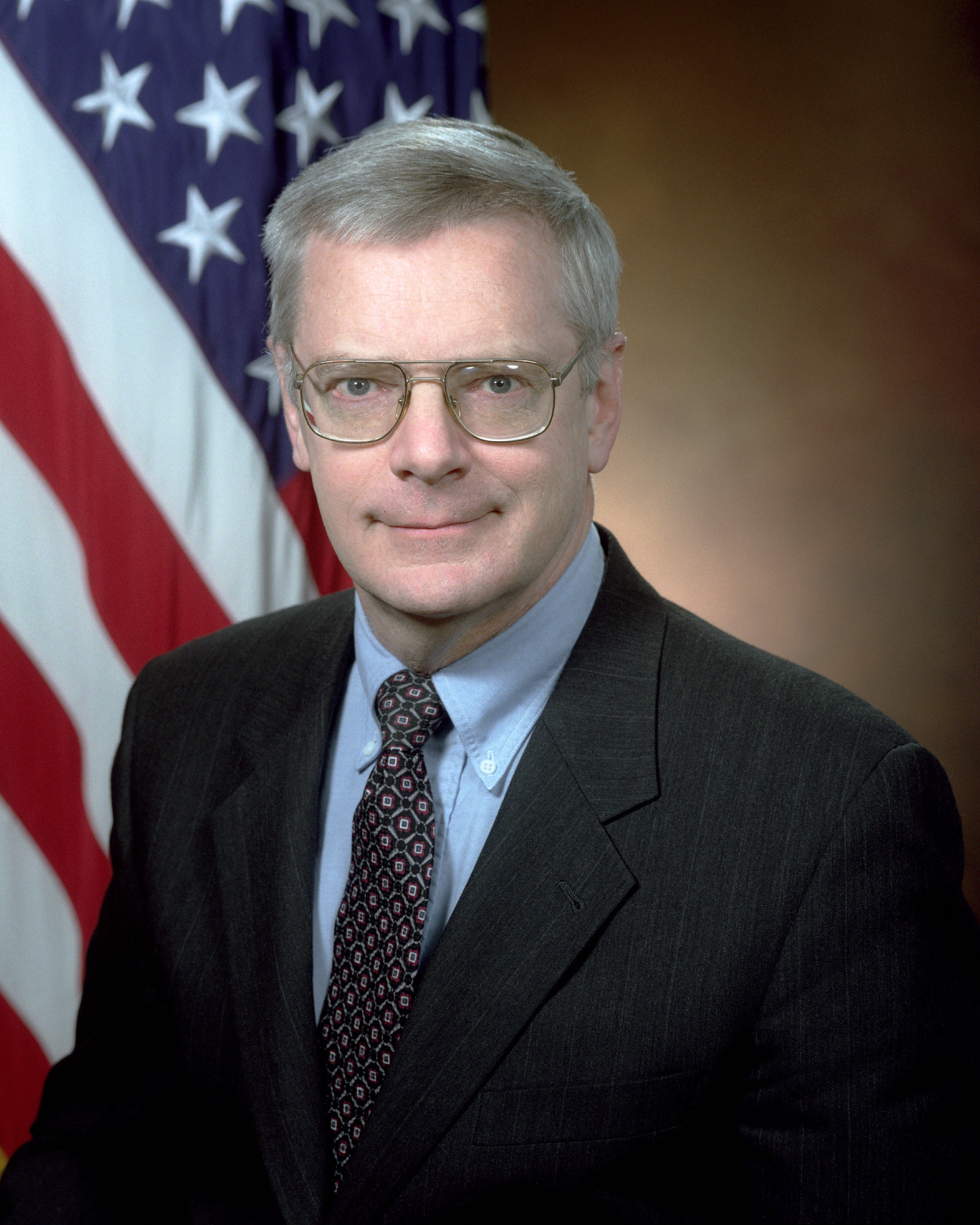

Under Secretary of Defense for Policy
- In office September 15, 1994 – January 19, 2001
- President: Bill Clinton
- Preceded by: Frank G. Wisner
- Succeeded by: Douglas Feith

Personal details
- Born: Walter Becker Brakeman; September 23, 1941 (age 84) Albuquerque, New Mexico, U.S.
- Party: Democratic
- Spouse: Ellen Seidman
- Children: 3
- Education: Princeton University (BA); Balliol College, Oxford; Harvard University (LLB)

Walter Becker Slocombe (born Walter Becker Brakeman; September 23, 1941) is a former Under Secretary of Defense for Policy (1994–2001) and was the Senior Advisor for Security and Defense to the Coalition Provisional Authority in Baghdad (2003).

A lawyer and career federal official, Slocombe joined the staff of the National Security Council in 1969. Prior to that, he worked as a law clerk for Supreme Court Justice Abe Fortas. Slocombe currently sits on the Board of Directors at the Atlantic Council, is a four-time recipient of an award for Distinguished Public Service and a member of the Council on Foreign Relations. He currently practices law with the Washington firm of Caplin & Drysdale.

== Education ==
Slocombe was born in Albuquerque, New Mexico and raised in Ann Arbor, Michigan, where he graduated from Tappan Junior High School in 1955 and the University High School in 1959. He earned a B.A. degree from the School of Public and International Affairs at Princeton University in 1963, where he received the Moses Taylor Pyne Honor Prize, the highest general distinction conferred on an undergraduate. Slocombe was also a Rhodes Scholar, studying Soviet politics at Balliol College, Oxford, from 1963 to 1965. He graduated summa cum laude with a LL.B. degree from Harvard Law School in 1968 and was admitted to the bar in 1970.

== U.S. Government service ==
- Committee on the Intelligence Capabilities of the United States Regarding Weapons of Mass Destruction (2004)
- Senior advisor for the Coalition Provisional Authority (2003)
- Under Secretary of Defense for Policy (1994–2001)
- Deputy Under Secretary of Defense for Policy (1979–1981), (1993–1994)
- Deputy Assistant Secretary for International Security Affairs (1977–1979)

== Personal life ==
Slocombe is married to Ellen (Shapiro) Seidman. He has two daughters and one son. His wife was employed by the Clinton White House.

== See also ==
- List of law clerks for the second seat of the Supreme Court of the United States
