= Anthony Tata =

American novelist and government official (born 1959)

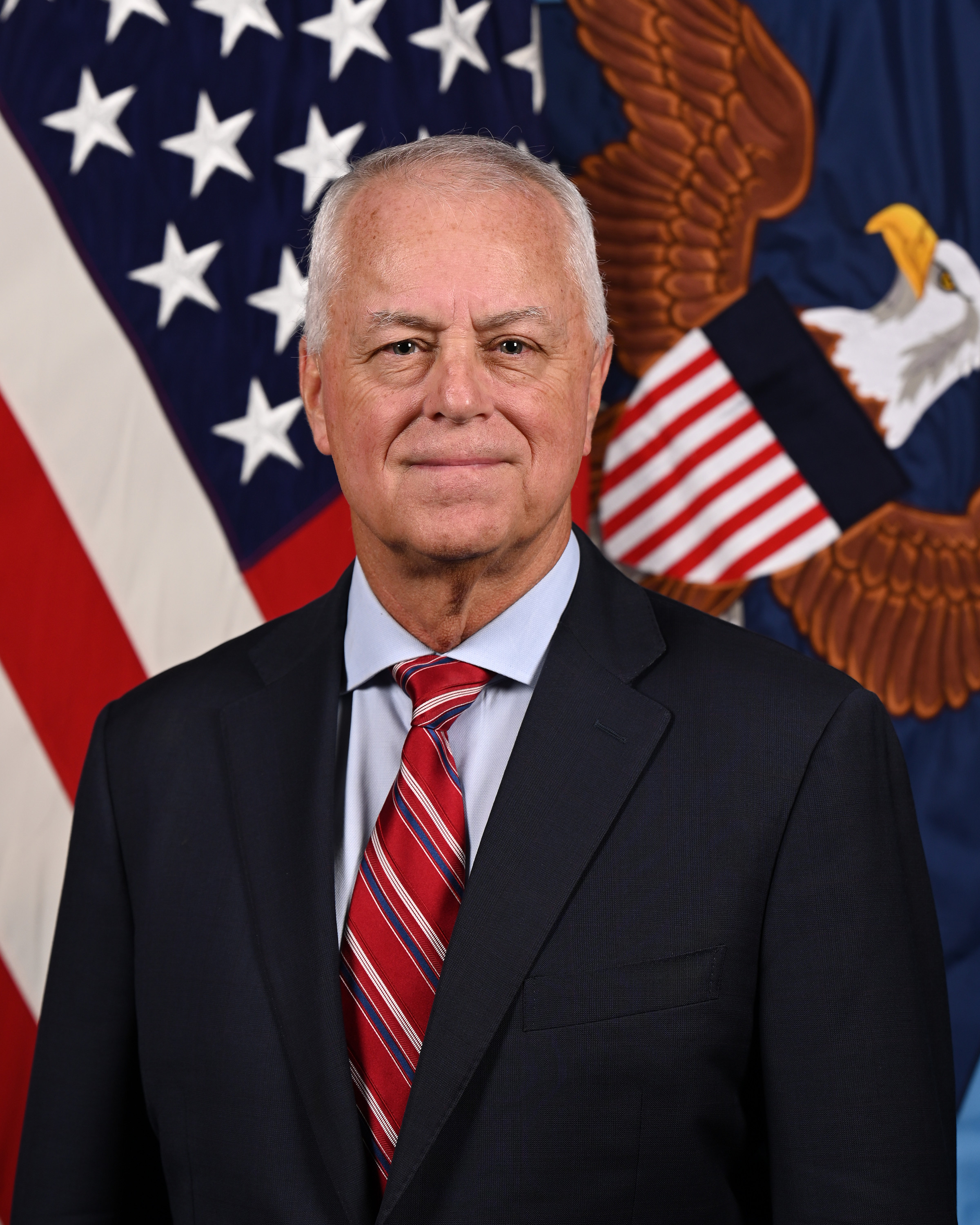
- Official portrait, 2025

Under Secretary of Defense for Personnel and Readiness (Note: Also known as Under Secretary of War for Personnel and Readiness following President Donald Trump's 2025 executive order authorizing it as a secondary title. However, only an act of Congress can formally and legally change the name of his position.)
- Incumbent
- Assumed office July 18, 2025
- President: Donald Trump
- Preceded by: Gil Cisneros

Senior Official Performing the Duties of Under Secretary of Defense for Policy
- In office November 10, 2020 – January 20, 2021
- President: Donald Trump
- Preceded by: James H. Anderson (as Acting Under Secretary)
- Succeeded by: Colin Kahl

Senior Official Performing the Duties of Deputy Under Secretary of Defense for Policy
- In office July 31, 2020 – November 10, 2020
- President: Donald Trump
- Preceded by: James H. Anderson (as Deputy Under Secretary)
- Succeeded by: Thomas M. Williams

Personal details
- Born: Anthony Jean Tata; September 7, 1959 (age 66) Norfolk, Virginia, U.S.
- Party: Republican
- Education: United States Military Academy (BS); Catholic University of America (MA); United States Army Command and General Staff College (MMAS)

Military service
- Allegiance: United States
- Branch/service: United States Army
- Years of service: 1981–2009
- Rank: Brigadier General
- Awards: Combat Action Badge; Bronze Star; Army Distinguished Service Medal; Defense Superior Service Medal; Legion of Merit

Anthony Jean Tata (born September 7, 1959) (/ˈteɪtə/) is an American retired military officer, author and government official.

Tata is a retired brigadier general of the United States Army, serving until 2009, and later served as a school district administrator for two large school districts in the District of Columbia and North Carolina. He served as Secretary of Transportation of North Carolina from 2013 to 2015 under Governor Pat McCrory. He is the author of the Threat series of thriller novels, and became a regular on Fox News after leaving the army, where he offered pro-Donald Trump commentary. He has claimed that Barack Obama is a Muslim and "terrorist leader" and promoted a conspiracy theory asserting that the CIA sought to frame Trump.

In 2020, Tata joined the Pentagon in a senior civilian advisory role to Defense Secretary Mark Esper. On April 23, 2020 Trump nominated Tata to the post of Under Secretary of Defense for Policy. His nomination was submitted to the Senate on June 11, 2020; a hearing on his confirmation was cancelled on July 30, and the White House planned to withdraw the nomination. Later, Tata was appointed as "the official Performing the Duties of the Deputy Undersecretary of Defense for Policy reporting to the acting Under Secretary of Defense for Policy, James Anderson." Following Anderson's resignation after the November 2020 elections, Tata served as the de facto acting Under Secretary under the official title "Performing the Duties of Under Secretary of Defense for Policy" until his resignation on January 15, 2021.

== Early life and education ==
Tata was born in Norfolk, Virginia, the second son of Robert Tata and Martha Jeraldine Morris Tata. In 1981, Tata received a Bachelor of Science from the United States Military Academy and chose Infantry as his branch of service. While serving as a National Security Fellow at the John F. Kennedy School of Government at Harvard University, Tata earned a Master of Arts in International Relations from the Catholic University of America. Tata is a graduate of the U.S. Army's Ranger School. Tata graduated from the School of Advanced Military Studies with a master's degree in Military Art and Science.

== Career ==
=== Military ===
Tata served in the United States Army for 28 years, retiring in 2009 with the rank of brigadier general. From 2006 to 2007, he was Deputy Commanding General of the 10th Mountain Division in Afghanistan. Tata served two tours of duty at Fort Bragg in the 82nd Airborne Division. As the Chief of Plans for the 82nd Airborne Division, Tata led the planning effort for Operation Uphold Democracy. He also was brigade commander in the 101st Airborne Division.

Tata and his first wife (Tracy Lynn) divorced in April 1993 under acrimonious circumstances: his ex-wife filed a complaint against him with the Army's Office of Inspector General (OIG), triggering an investigation. The OIG concluded in June 2007 that Tata had extramarital affairs in 1985 and 1992 while still married. The affairs involved three different women, and a son born out of wedlock. Adultery is a violation of the Uniform Code of Military Justice under certain circumstances. Tata did not contest the finding of adultery, and Army leaders did not penalize him over the finding. The OIG investigation also concluded Tata's ex-wife's other allegations were "not substantiated." OIG's conclusion rejecting the allegation of failure to pay child support was based on a supposed 2001 Georgia court order submitted as evidence by Tata and his lawyer. It was later determined, however, that the document was fraudulent, with the signatures of the Georgia judge and counsel having been forged. Tata and his lawyer acknowledged that the court order they had produced to OIG was "not genuine" and later produced the genuine order, which was substantively different. OIG never determined who created the false document and forged the signatures. Tata and his counsel said they did not create the document.

Upon his retirement in June 2009, Tata received the Distinguished Service Medal.

=== Public schools administrator ===
After retiring from active duty service, he served as the Chief Operating Officer of the District of Columbia Public Schools from 2009 to 2010. In 2010, he was named Superintendent of the Wake County Public School System. Tata had strained relationships with several members of the Wake County School Board, which shifted to a Democratic majority during Tata's service. Opposition fell along party-lines. Citing concerns over his "leadership style" and his handling of student assignment issues in the large school district, Tata's contract was terminated after less than two years, in 2012. The decision to buy out Tata's contract under a no-fault clause was controversial, with two local polls suggesting that a majority of Wake County voters and parents of children in the district opposed the decision to remove Tata.

=== Secretary of the North Carolina Department of Transportation ===
In January 2013, North Carolina governor Pat McCrory appointed Tata as Secretary of the North Carolina Department of Transportation. Tata considered challenging U.S. Representative Walter B. Jones, but dropped the idea after it became public in June 2015. As Secretary he was "a forceful advocate for the governor's highways, ports and railroads improvements campaign" and promoted McCrory's proposals to take out $3 billion in bonds for transportation infrastructure. A compromise with environmentalists over the replacement of the Herbert C. Bonner Bridge was one element of his tenure. Tata abruptly resigned on July 28, 2015.

=== Political commentator ===
Tata has appeared on commentary panels on Fox News. In his political commentary, Tata was a regular defender of Donald Trump and his administration. In November 2018, he defended Trump's decision to send troops to the U.S.–Mexico border.

==== Conspiratorial and inflammatory comments ====
In Twitter posts and radio-show appearances in 2017 and 2018, Tata repeatedly made the false claim that President Barack Obama was a "Muslim" and a "terrorist leader"; accused Obama of being "an anti-Semite" who wanted to "destroy Israel" and "did not want" to defeat ISIL; and claimed that the negotiation of the multilateral nuclear agreement with Iran was born by Obama's "Islamic roots." Tata accused then-President Barack Obama and first lady Michelle Obama of being "borderline treasonous" during Trump's transition to the presidency. In August 2018, he accused former CIA Director John O. Brennan, a critic of Trump, of being a "clear and present danger" to the U.S. and called Brennan a "communist" on Fox & Friends. He repeatedly pushed the notion that a "deep state cabal" was working to undermine Trump; pushed false conspiracy theories that Brennan ordered the assassination of Trump; and, on another occasion, tweeted at Brennan, "Might be a good time to pick your poison: firing squad, public hanging, life sentence as prison b*tch, or just suck on your pistol." Tata also referred to Islam as "the most oppressive, violent religion"; accused both Obama and former president Bill Clinton of being guilty of "sedition and/or treason"; accused Obama of being a "Manchurian candidate" who supported "Hamas & Muslim brotherhood"; and suggested that "the left" and Obama "hates America." Tata also made various inflammatory Twitter posts attacking Democratic politicians Nancy Pelosi and Maxine Waters as "violent extremists" and using a racist hashtag to criticize CNN journalist Don Lemon.

Tata deleted several of his Twitter posts after they were publicized by CNN in June 2020, following an investigation by Andrew Kaczynski and others.

=== First Trump administration ===
In spring 2020, Tata joined the Pentagon as a senior advisor to Defense Secretary Mark Esper.

On April 24, 2020, Trump announced his intent to nominate Tata to be the next Under Secretary of Defense for Policy, replacing John Rood, who resigned from the position in February 2020. On June 11, 2020, Trump formally nominated Tata for the position, which is the third-highest ranking position in the Defense Department.

Upon his nomination, Tata's past conspiratorial and inflammatory comments in Twitter posts, radio interviews, and other statements led to opposition to the appointment. After the nomination was made, 51 minority, LGBT, faith, disability and employee groups (including the NAACP and American Federation of Teachers) sent an open letter to senators opposing Tata's confirmation, calling him "patently unfit" for the post due to his comments and criticizing Tata's record as superintendent of the Wake County, North Carolina school system. Democrats, included Senate Armed Services Services committee ranking member Jack Reed of Rhode Island, strongly opposed Tata's nomination, citing his past comments. A number of Republicans also expressed concerns or ambivalence about the nomination, although the Republican chair of the Senate Armed Services Services, James M. Inhofe, expressed support for Tata, and Trump pressed the committee to move forward with a hearing on his nomination. In June 2020, Tata sent a letter to senators apologizing for his past remarks, saying the comments "while grievous, are not indicative of who I am." Several former generals, including Joseph Votel and Tony Thomas, withdrew their support for Tata after learning of his offensive comments. Retired generals Clarence K.K. Chinn and Dana J.H. Pittard supported Tata's confirmation, saying that Tata's past remarks were "ill-considered" but that Tata had a record of supporting "racial, ethnic and religious equality" in his military and civilian service.

On July 30, 2020, Tata's confirmation hearing before the Senate Armed Services Committee was canceled just before it was set to begin, signaling that there might not be a sufficient number of Republicans to confirm Tata's appointment. On the same day, the White House reportedly advised the committee that the nomination was likely to be withdrawn. Tata was then appointed as "the official Performing the Duties of the Deputy Undersecretary of Defense for Policy reporting to the Acting Undersecretary of Defense for Policy Dr. James Anderson", a position that does not require confirmation by the Senate. Both the Chairman of the House Armed Services Committee, Adam Smith, and the ranking Democrat on the Senate Armed Services Committee, Jack Reed, condemned the appointment, with Reed describing it as "an insult to our troops, professionals at the Pentagon, the Senate, and the American people."

With the resignation of James Anderson in November 2020, Tata assumed the responsibilities of the acting Under Secretary of Defense for Policy, or "the senior official performing the duties of the under secretary of defense for policy". Defense Secretary Lloyd Austin fired Tata in February 2021.

In December 2020, Trump named Tata to the Board of Visitors of the U.S. Merchant Marine Academy.

=== Second Trump administration ===
On February 3, 2025, Tata was nominated by U.S. President Donald Trump to be the Under Secretary of Defense for Personnel and Readiness. His nomination was confirmed by the Senate on July 15, 2025.

=== Novelist ===
Tata's work has been referred to as "Tom Clancy-style military thrillers". His novel Besieged was listed by Publishers Weekly as a Top 10 Thriller/Mystery of 2017.

Tata's published books are:

- Threat Series
  - Book I, Sudden Threat (2009), ISBN 978-1935142089
  - Book II, Rogue Threat (2009), ISBN 978-1935142096
  - Book III, Hidden Threat (2011), ISBN 978-1935142171
  - Book IV, Mortal Threat (2015) ISBN 978-1508483786
- Captain Jake Mahegan Series
  - Foreign and Domestic (2015), ISBN 0786035404
  - Three Minutes to Midnight (2016), ISBN 1496706250
  - Besieged (2017) ISBN 978-1496706638
  - Direct Fire (2017) ISBN 978-1496706645
  - Dark Winter (2018) ISBN 978-1496717900
  - Double Crossfire (2019) ISBN 978-1496717924
- Reaper Series, published as A. J. Tata
  - With Nicholas Irving. Reaper: Ghost Target (2018) ISBN 1250127343
  - With Nicholas Irving. Reaper: Threat Zero (2019) ISBN 125012736X
  - With Nicholas Irving. Reaper: Drone Strike (2020) ISBN 9781250240743

As of 2008, all of the proceeds from Tata's Threat Series books had been donated to the USO Metro DC Hospital Services fund for Wounded Warriors at Walter Reed Army Medical Center; by 2008, $15,000 had been donated.

== Personal life ==
Tata, who is of Italian ancestry, and has two children. He married Tracy Lynn Burt on July 16, 1983; they were divorced in April 1993. In 2015, Tata married his third wife, Jodi Amanda.

In 2025, Tata filed a defamation lawsuit in Florida against a social media astrologer that he had been friendly with, which included a claim that she had been cyberstalking him and his wife.
