= A. Wess Mitchell =

American foreign policy expert and diplomat (born 1977)

Wess Mitchell
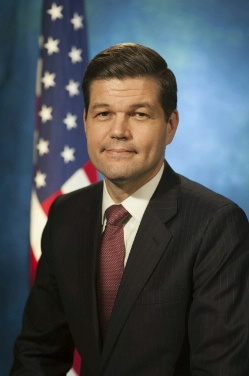

26th Assistant Secretary of State for European and Eurasian Affairs
- In office October 12, 2017 – February 15, 2019
- President: Donald Trump
- Preceded by: Victoria Nuland
- Succeeded by: Karen Donfried

Personal details
- Born: Aaron Wess Mitchell; April 1, 1977 (age 49) Texas, U.S.
- Party: Republican
- Spouse: Elizabeth
- Children: 2
- Education: Texas Tech University (BA); Georgetown University (MA); Free University of Berlin (PhD)

Aaron Wess Mitchell (born April 1, 1977) is an American strategist, historian and former diplomat who served as the Assistant Secretary of State for European and Eurasian Affairs from 2017 to 2019. In 2019 he co-founded The Marathon Initiative, a grand strategy think tank, with Elbridge Colby.

== Early life and education ==
Mitchell was born in Lubbock, Texas, in 1977. He received a B.A. in history from Texas Tech University, where he later received a Distinguished Alumni Award. He received an M.A. in German and European studies from the Georgetown University School of Foreign Service, where he was awarded the 2004 Hopper Award. He received his DPhil in Political Science from Freie Universität Berlin.

== Career ==
In 2005, Mitchell co-founded the Center for European Policy Analysis (CEPA) with Laurence E. Hirsch. At CEPA he argued that U.S. foreign policy should shift away from the focus on nation-building in Iraq and Afghanistan to a focus on competition with major powers Russia and China and maintaining a balance of power in key regions. He was an early proponent of using deterrence-by-denial to defend frontline U.S. allies from Russian or Chinese attack. Where deterrence-by-punishment seeks to dissuade aggression by threatening retaliation against the attacker, deterrence-by-denial seeks to dissuade aggression by making the object of attack itself more resistant to attack. Mitchell's 2016 book Unquiet Frontier (co-authored with Jakub Grygiel) has been cited as having influenced the shift in U.S. national security in the first Trump administration toward an emphasis on great-power competition.

=== First Trump administration ===
In July 2017, President Donald J. Trump appointed Mitchell to become the Assistant Secretary of State for European and Eurasian Affairs, a capacity in which he served into 2019. In this role, he was responsible for diplomatic relations with the 50 countries of Europe and Eurasia, as well as the institutions of NATO, the EU, and OSCE.

As Assistant Secretary, Mitchell played a principal role in formulating Europe strategy in the first Trump administration. Mitchell's approach to policy emphasized Europe's role in strategic competition between the United States and Russia and China. In a speech at the Heritage Foundation on June 5, 2018, he advocated for a policy of "strategic renovation" aimed at improving the performance of alliances to offset U.S. global burdens. In Congressional testimony on June 26, 2018, he argued for increasing Western European burden-sharing, competing for influence in East-Central Europe, and increasing U.S. involvement in the Eastern Mediterranean.

While at State, Mitchell criticized Western European allies for "failing to take strategic competition seriously" by maintaining close commercial and energy ties with China, Russia and Iran while relying on the United States for security. He was an advocate for European allies increasing defense spending, increasing purchases of U.S. liquefied natural gas, and lowering EU tariff barriers against U.S. goods.

Mitchell increased the U.S. diplomatic focus on East-Central Europe. During his tenure, the United States for the first time held strategic dialogues with the countries of Austria, Greece and Italy. Mitchell supported the Three Seas Initiative, increased U.S. participation in efforts to resolve the conflict between Serbia and Kosovo, and played a role in the resolution of the Greece-Macedonia dispute.

Mitchell was responsible for a series of diplomatic thaws involving countries with which the United States had formerly maintained antagonistic relationships. He reopened dialogue with Serbia and Hungary and was the first senior U.S. diplomat to travel to Minsk in more than a decade. Some observers criticized these moves for engaging with non-democratic regimes. Others defended them as an attempt to offer these countries a viable Western strategic alternative to Russia and China Mitchell described the policy as an effort to "compete for positive influence" in strategically vital regions.

Mitchell was an advocate for increased U.S. diplomatic involvement in the Eastern Mediterranean. He shifted from longstanding U.S. policy by upgrading relations with Greece and normalizing relations with Cyprus. This paved the way for the so-called 3+1 Format, a trilateral framework involving Greece, Israel, Cyprus and the US, as well as the EastMed Act, which formalized closer US strategic cooperation with Greece and Cyprus.

Mitchell played a lead role in negotiating a diplomatic deal between the United States and Turkey known as the "Manbij Roadmap" that reduced tensions in northern Syria.

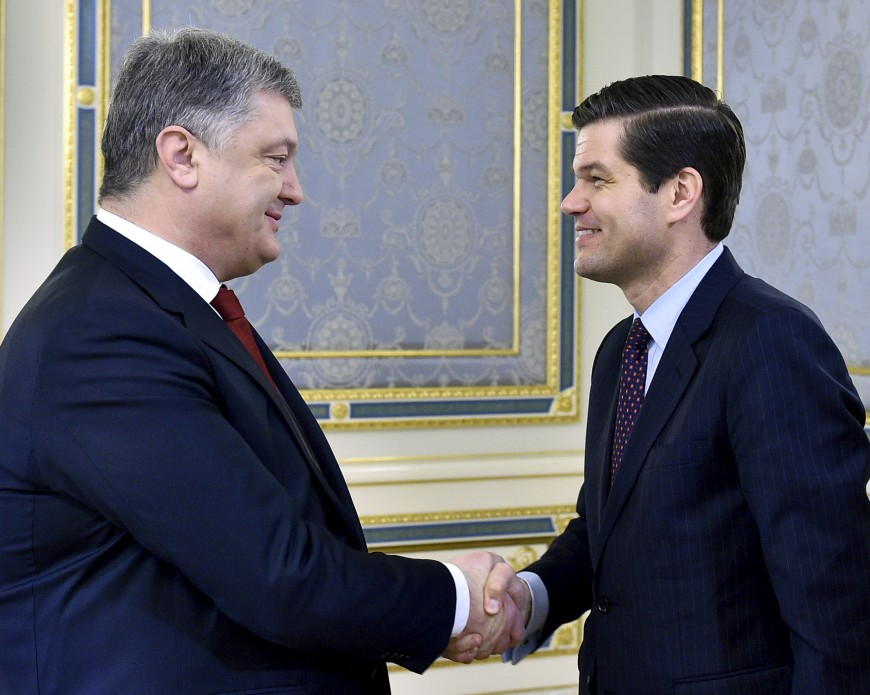
Mitchell greeting Ukrainian President Petro Poroshenko in November 2017

In relations with Russia, Mitchell was an advocate for supporting the national independence of Ukraine and Belarus while engaging diplomatically with Russia when its interests aligned with those of the US. He was a frequent defender of Trump's Russia policy in Senate hearings. He was credited with creating a U.S. "deterrence by denial" strategy to support Ukraine and for what Secretary of State Mike Pompeo called "diplomatic jujitsu" in organizing NATO support for the U.S. decision to withdraw from the INF Treaty.

Mitchell played a role in securing the release of the American evangelical pastor Andrew Brunson from Turkish prison. He also played a role in persuading the German government to facilitate the deportation of the alleged Holocaust prison camp guard Jakiw Palij, the "last known Nazi collaborator living in America."

In a January 4, 2019, letter to Secretary of State Mike Pompeo, Mitchell stated personal and professional reasons for his decision to resign from his post. In an interview, he said he had not taken this decision in a protest at the Trump administration's policies.

After stepping down as Assistant Secretary, Mitchell was named by NATO Secretary General Jens Stoltenberg to co-chair a commission to review the political cohesion of NATO in response to French President Emmanuel Macron's claim that the Alliance was "braindead." Mitchell co-chaired the commission with former German Defense Minister Thomas de Maizière. The body's report, which was released on November 25, 2020, called for NATO to institute reforms aimed at shifting from a focus on Afghanistan to competition with Russia and China.

=== Post-administration career ===
In 2019 Mitchell co-founded with Elbridge Colby The Marathon Initiative, a 501c3 think tank that studies great-power competition. Mitchell's work at The Marathon Initiative has focused on the so-called "simultaneity problem," or problem of two-front war in American strategy. He has advocated for a sequential approach to dealing with the threat of simultaneous conflicts with Russia, China and Iran. He has advocated for a "diplomacy first" approach to reduce tensions with major U.S. adversaries.

== Political views ==
Mitchell is a conservative. He has argued against a "transformationalist" U.S. foreign policy based on democracy promotion and nation-building and in favor of basing policy on a traditional conception of U.S. national interests and maintenance of a balance of power in key regions. He has criticized globalization and the decision to admit China to the WTO. He has argued against using U.S. foreign policy to promote progressive political causes.

Mitchell is a life member of the Council on Foreign Relations.

== Books ==
Mitchell's scholarly writing has focused on diplomatic history during the classical European states system, with an emphasis on the Habsburg Monarchy and the foreign policies of Cardinal Richelieu, Wenzel von Kaunitz, Klemmens von Metternich and Otto von Bismarck.

Mitchell's 2025 book Great Power Diplomacy criticizes post-Cold War U.S. foreign policy for over-emphasizing military power and economic sanctions to the exclusion of traditional diplomacy. The book argues against using diplomacy as a tool for advancing liberal goals to supplant the nation-state and in favor of using diplomacy as an instrument of grand strategy to advance state interests and gain competitive advantage against rivals.

Mitchell's 2018 book The Grand Strategy of the Habsburg Monarchy argued that the empire of Austria succeeded against militarily stronger opponents by conducting a conservative grand strategy that emphasized "conserving power, recognizing limits, and preserving the dynasty." An article in The Wall Street Journal about the Habsburg Empire that Mitchell co-authored with Purdue University historian Charles Ingrao received a Stanton Prize for using applied history to illuminate contemporary challenges.

Mitchell's 2016 book Unquiet Frontier (co-authored with Jakub Grygiel) examined U.S. alliance structures in the world's major regions and argued for the United States to shift its foreign policy focus from counter-insurgency in Afghanistan and Iraq toward competition with great-power rivals.

Mitchell's 2009 book The Godfather Doctrine (co-authored with John Hulsman) used the interplay between the Corleone brothers in Francis Ford Coppola's 1972 film The Godfather to describe the major schools of thought in international relations and advocate for basing U.S. foreign policy on political realism rather than neoconservatism or liberal internationalism.

== Personal life ==
Mitchell is a member of the vestry at Grace Church in Keswick, Virginia. He is married and has two children.

== Selected publications ==
- Great Power Diplomacy: The Skill of Statecraft from Attila the Hun to Henry Kissinger. Princeton University Press. 2025. ISBN 978-0691236872
- The Grand Strategy of the Habsburg Empire. Princeton University Press. 2018. ISBN 978-0691176703
- Unquiet Frontier: Rising Rivals, Vulnerable Allies, and the Crisis of American Power. Princeton University Press. 2016. ISBN 978-0691178264
- The Godfather Doctrine. Princeton University Press. 2006. ISBN 978-0691141473

== Honors ==
International and foreign awards
Officer's Cross of the Order of Merit, Republic of Poland
Commander's Cross of the Order of Merit, Hungary
Gold Medal of the Ministry of Foreign Affairs, Slovak Republic
