= Mara Karlin =

American foreign policy and defense advisor

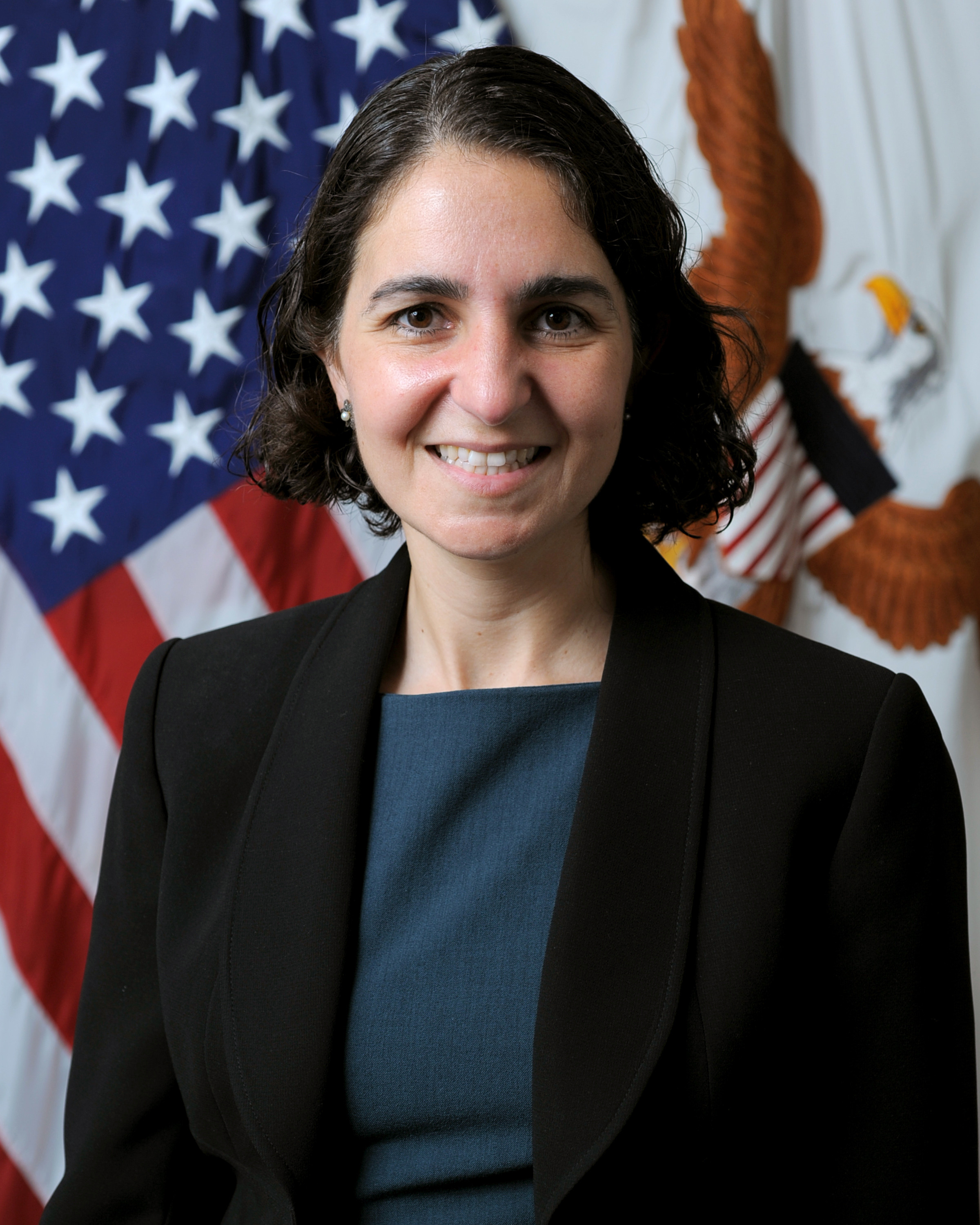

Assistant Secretary of Defense for Strategy, Plans, and Capabilities
- In office August 23, 2021 – December 20, 2023
- President: Joe Biden
- Preceded by: Victorino Mercado
- Succeeded by: Madeline Mortelmans (Acting)

Deputy Under Secretary of Defense for Policy
- In office August 23, 2021 – December 20, 2023
- President: Joe Biden
- Preceded by: Amanda J. Dory
- Succeeded by: Melissa Dalton (acting)

Personal details
- Education: Tulane University (BA); Johns Hopkins University (MA, PhD)
- Awards: Department of Defense Medal for Distinguished Public Service

Mara Elizabeth Karlin is an American foreign policy and national security expert. In April 2021, President Joe Biden nominated Karlin to serve as the Assistant Secretary of Defense for Strategy, Plans, and Capabilities. She was confirmed by the U.S. Senate by voice vote on August 9, 2021. Alongside this position she served as the Acting Deputy Under Secretary of Defense for Policy for approximately two years. She led the 2022 National Defense Strategy guiding the $850 billion defense budget. Previously, she served as the Acting Assistant Secretary of Defense for International Security Affairs. In this role she served as the main advisor to Secretary of Defense Lloyd Austin on U.S. security policies related to every country in Europe, the Middle East, Africa, Eurasia, and the Western Hemisphere. Her portfolio included shaping U.S. defense policy related to NATO.

== Education ==
Karlin earned a B.A. degree summa cum laude in political science and Jewish studies from Newcomb College at Tulane University in 2001. She then attended Johns Hopkins University's School of Advanced International Studies, completing an M.A. degree in strategic studies, Middle East studies and international economics in 2005 and a Ph.D. in international relations in 2012. Her doctoral thesis was entitled Training and Equipping is Not Transforming: An Assessment of U.S. Programs to Build Partner Militaries.

== Career ==
Karlin began her career in government as a career civil servant in the Office of the Secretary of Defense covering India and Pakistan, following this she served as the Levant director in the Pentagon. She later became the Deputy Assistant Secretary of Defense for Strategy and Force Development during the Obama administration. In that capacity, she helped develop the 2015 National Security Strategy and the 2014 Quadrennial Defense Review.

Upon leaving the Obama administration, Karlin returned to her alma mater, Johns Hopkins University's School of Advanced International Studies, to first become the deputy director of the Strategic Studies Department and later its Director until leaving academia for government. During her time at Johns Hopkins University, she also was an associate professor. Simultaneously, Karlin served as a nonresident senior fellow with the Center for Security, Strategy, and Technology at the Brookings Institution

In 2018, Karlin was on the National Defense Strategy Commission staff, and a member of the congressionally appointed Syria Study Group.

=== Biden administration ===
Karlin was on the defense policy team for the Biden-Harris transition.

In January 2021, Karlin was appointed to serve as the Principal Deputy Assistant Secretary of Defense for International Security Affairs. The position did not require Senate confirmation, and she began service on January 20, 2021, immediately after President Biden was inaugurated. As the most senior member of the International Security Affairs Office, Karlin became the Acting Assistant Secretary of Defense for International Security Affairs, leading the department's relations with nearly 150 countries.

In April 2021, the White House announced that President Joe Biden had nominated Karlin as Assistant Secretary of Defense for Strategy, Plans, & Capabilities. Karlin received unanimous Senate confirmation on August 9. In this role Karlin led development of the 2022 National Defense Strategy, Nuclear Posture Review, and Missile Defense Review—the first integrated strategy review in Department of Defense history. In this capacity, she also was responsible for advising the Secretary of Defense and others on the forces, plans, posture, emerging capabilities, and security cooperation activities necessary to implement the National Defense Strategy. As part of this, she manages policy and strategy for the Defense Security Cooperation Agency.

In addition to her role in writing and implementing the 2022 National Defense Strategy, Karlin guided the AUKUS agreement between the US, UK, and Australia, which, according to a speech by President Biden, is meant to help in "developing Australia’s conventionally armed nuclear-powered submarine capacity."

Karlin also helped form a new emerging capabilities policy office. In 2023, Karlin received the Department of Defense Medal for Distinguished Public Service, the highest award given to civilians by the Secretary of Defense.

On 11 December 2023, Karlin announced that she would be stepping down from her position as Acting Deputy Under Secretary of Defense for Policy and Assistant Secretary of Defense for Strategy, Plans, and Capabilities, to take up a position in academia. On July 8, 2024, the Brookings Institution announced that Karlin had been appointed a visiting fellow. Simultaneously Karlin is a professor at Johns Hopkins University's School of Advanced International Studies. In 2026, Karlin was appointed by Jack Reed to serve on the Commission on the National Defense Strategy.

== Publications ==
Karlin is the author of two books, Building Militaries in Fragile States: Challenges for the United States, and The Inheritance: America's Military After Two Decades of War.
