= Assistant Secretary of Defense for Strategy, Plans, and Capabilities =

U.S. Department of Defense official

United States Assistant Secretary of Defense for Strategy, Plans, and Capabilities
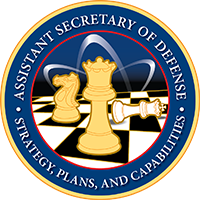
- Seal of the assistant secretary of defense for strategy, plans, & capabilities

- Flag of an assistant secretary of defense

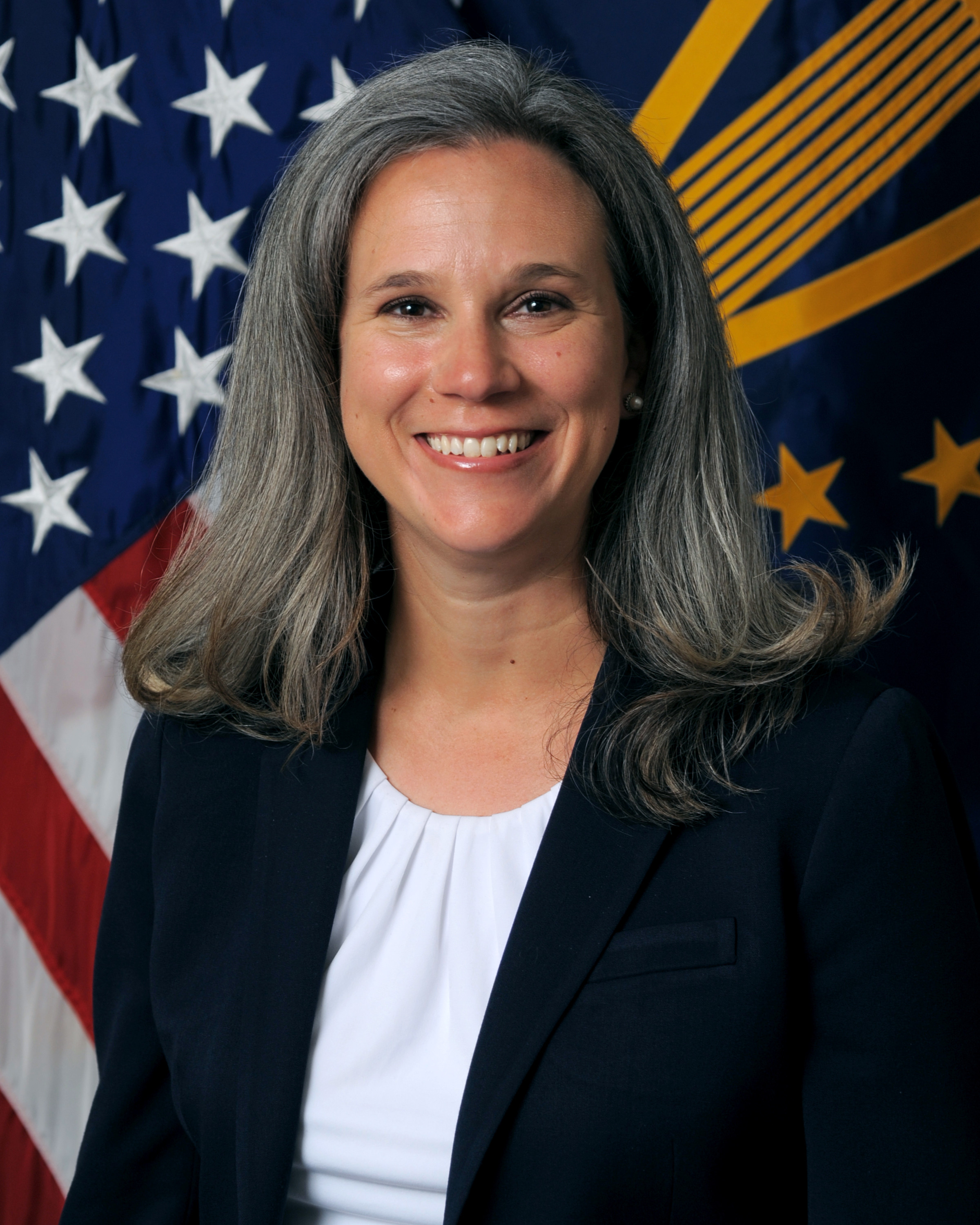
- Incumbent; Madeline Mortelmans; Acting since July 27, 2026
- United States Department of Defense
- Abbreviation: ASD (SPC)
- Reports to: Under Secretary of Defense for Policy
- Appointer: The president; with Senate advice and consent
- Term length: Appointed
- Constituting instrument: 10 U.S.C. § 138
- Formation: January 9, 2015
- First holder: Robert M. Scher
- Website: Official website

The assistant secretary of defense for strategy, plans, and capabilities (ASD(SPC)) is a position in the United States Department of Defense responsible for the overall supervision of DoD policy for strategy, capabilities, forces and contingency plans necessary to implement the national defense strategy. The officeholder reports to the under secretary of defense for policy.

== History ==
On January 9, 2015 Deputy Secretary of Defense Robert O. Work established the position of Assistant Secretary of Defense (Strategy, Plans, and Capabilities) in accordance with section 906 of the National Defense Authorization Act for Fiscal Year 2010, as amended, PL 111-84, which eliminated all non-presidentially appointed, Senate-confirmed deputy under secretaries of defense. The assistant secretary of defense (strategy, plans, and capabilities) replaced and assumed the responsibilities of the deputy under secretary of defense (strategy, plans, and forces). The assistant secretary of defense (strategy, plans, and capabilities) gained responsibility for advising the secretary of defense and the under secretary of defense (policy) on the development of national security and defense strategy, military planning, budgeting, and various force development, force management, and corporate processes. This position also assumed responsibility for security cooperation, previously managed by the assistant secretary of defense for special operations and low-intensity conflict.

== Structure ==
The ASD (SPC) is supported by four deputy assistant secretaries (DASDs), each with coverage of a different mission area:

- Force development and emerging capabilities
- Global partnerships
- Plans and posture
- Strategy

== Officeholders ==
The table below includes the holders of this office.

Assistant secretaries of defense (strategy, plans, and capabilities)
Name	Tenure	SecDef(s) served under	President(s) served under
Robert Scher	January 9, 2015 – January 20, 2017	Chuck Hagel Ash Carter	Barack Obama
Thomas Harvey (Acting)	January 20, 2017 – August 30, 2018	Jim Mattis	Donald Trump
James H. Anderson	August 30, 2018 – July 20, 2019	Jim Mattis	Donald Trump
Victorino Mercado (Performing the Duties Of)	July 20, 2019 – March 2, 2020	Jim Mattis; Mark Esper	Donald Trump
James H. Anderson	March 2, 2020 – June 8, 2020	Mark Esper	Donald Trump
Victorino Mercado	June 8, 2020 – January 20, 2021	Mark Esper	Donald Trump
Melissa Dalton (Acting)	January 20, 2021 – August 17, 2021	Lloyd Austin	Joe Biden
Mara Karlin	August 17, 2021 – December 20, 2023	Lloyd Austin	Joe Biden
Melissa Dalton (Acting)	August 23, 2021 – February 14, 2022	Lloyd Austin	Joe Biden
Madeline Mortelmans (Acting)	December 20, 2023 – January 20, 2025	Lloyd Austin	Joe Biden
Austin Dahmer (Acting)	January 22, 2025 – March 17, 2025	Pete Hegseth	Donald Trump
Madeline Mortelmans (Acting)	March 17, 2025 – April 21, 2025	Pete Hegseth	Donald Trump
Rafael Leonardo (Acting)	April 21, 2025 - July 27, 2026	Pete Hegseth	Donald Trump
Madeline Mortelmans (Acting)	July 27, 2026 - Present	Pete Hegseth	Donald Trump
