= Cara L. Abercrombie =

American foreign policy and defense advisor

Cara Abercrombie
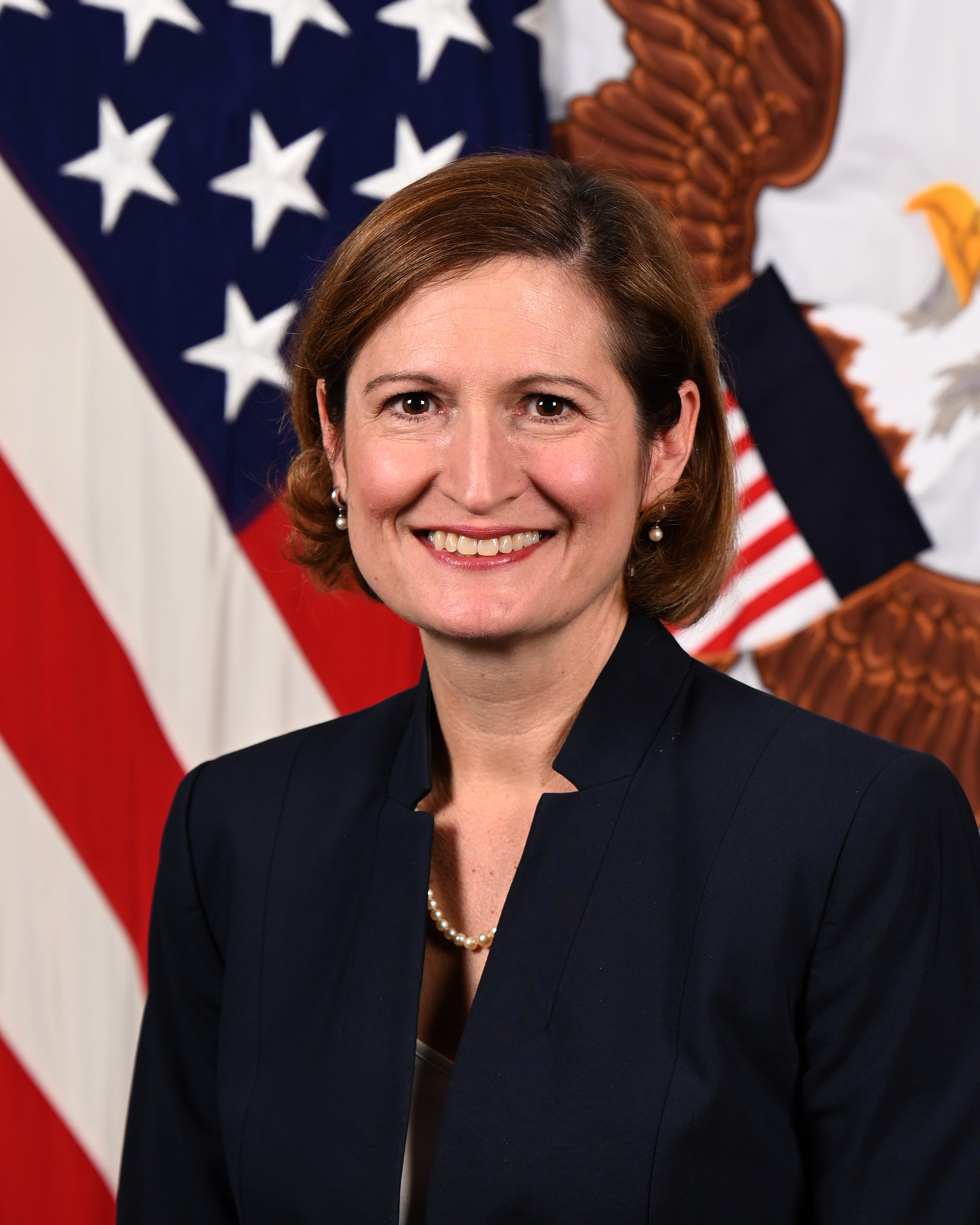
- Official portrait, 2024

Principal Deputy Under Secretary of Defense for Policy
- Acting; May 29, 2024 – January 20, 2025
- President: Joe Biden
- Preceded by: Melissa Dalton (acting)
- Succeeded by: Amanda J. Dory (acting)

Assistant Secretary of Defense for Acquisition
- In office March 5, 2024 – January 20, 2025
- President: Joe Biden
- Preceded by: Kevin M. Fahey (2021)
- Succeeded by: Gary A. Ashworth (acting)

Personal details
- Education: Dartmouth College (BA); Princeton University (MPA)

Cara L. Abercrombie is an American defense official who served as the Assistant Secretary of Defense for Acquisition in the Biden administration.

== Education ==
Abercrombie earned a Bachelor of Arts degree in government from Dartmouth College and a Master of Public Administration from Princeton School of Public and International Affairs.

== Career ==
Abercrombie began her career as a program analyst at the National Democratic Institute observing elections in Azerbaijan, Belarus, Macedonia. Later after graduating from Princeton she was selected for the Presidential Management Fellows Program serving in a variety of capacities at the Department of Defense beginning in 2003. Her subsequent positions in the Department included Principal Director for East Asia Policy, Special Assistant to the Secretary of Defense, Director for South Asia, Human Capital Strategy Advisor to the Under Secretary for Policy, Defense Institution Building Coordinator, and Senior Country Director for India. Lastly, she was the Deputy Assistant Secretary of Defense for South and Southeast Asia from 2016 to 2017.

Later in 2017, Abercrombie was a visiting scholar at the Carnegie Endowment for International Peace. After returning to the Defense Department, she assumed the role of Principal Director for Security Cooperation Workforce Development. In September 2019, Abercrombie was named the first president of Defense Security Cooperation University. Abercrombie was detailed to the National Security Council in 2021 as the senior director for defense. Most recently Abercrombie served as deputy assistant to the president and as a coordinator for defense policy and arms control.

=== Biden administration ===
Abercrombie was nominated to serve as Assistant Secretary of Defense for Acquisition in April 2023. Abercrombie was confirmed by the Senate on February 27, 2024. She started her assignment on March 5, 2024.
