= James Anderson (defense official) =

American government official and academic

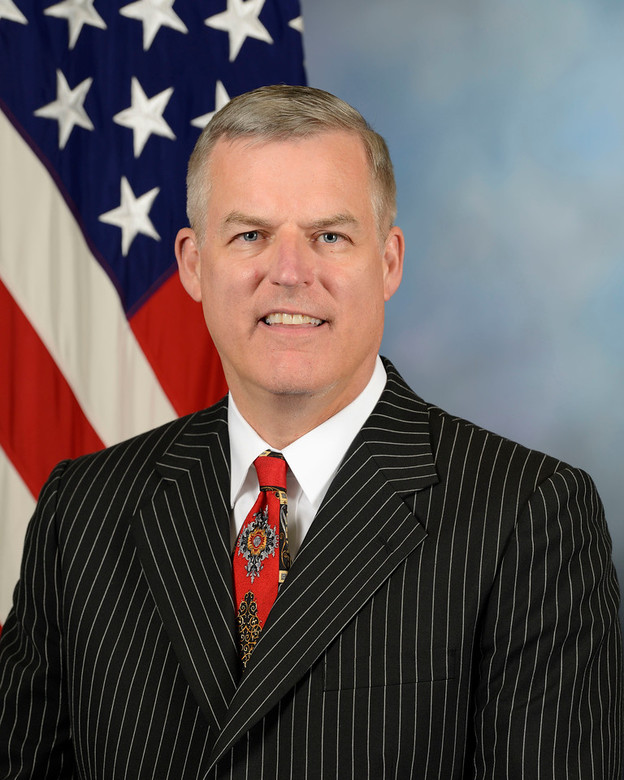

Under Secretary of Defense for Policy
- acting
- In office March 1, 2020 – November 10, 2020
- President: Donald Trump
- Preceded by: John Rood
- Succeeded by: Anthony Tata (Acting)

Assistant Secretary of Defense for Strategy, Plans, and Capabilities
- In office August 30, 2018 – June 8, 2020
- President: Donald Trump
- Preceded by: Robert Scher
- Succeeded by: Victorino Mercado

Personal details
- Born: James Herbert Anderson
- Education: Amherst College (BA); Tufts University (MA, PhD)

James Herbert Anderson is an American government official and academic who served as acting Under Secretary of Defense for Policy in the Donald Trump administration.

== Early life and education ==
Anderson earned a Bachelor of Arts degree in philosophy from Amherst College. He then earned a Master of Arts in law and a PhD in international affairs from the Fletcher School of Law and Diplomacy at Tufts University. His 1993 doctoral thesis was entitled National decisionmaking and quick-strike intervention during the 1980s: a comparative analysis of operations Urgent Fury, El Dorado Canyon, and Just Cause and his thesis advisor was Richard H. Shultz.

== Career ==
Anderson began his career as a United States Marine Corps intelligence officer. In the Bush administration, he served in the Office of Secretary of Defense, notably as the Director of Middle East Policy in International Security Affairs, among other policy positions from 2001 to 2009. He also worked as a professor at the Marine Corps University, National Defense University, George Washington University, the University of Phoenix, and Lasell University. From 2009 to 2012, he worked as a professor of international security studies at the George C. Marshall European Center for Security Studies. From 2012 to 2015, he served as dean of academics and deputy director of the Marine Corps War College. From 2015 until his appointment, Anderson was the vice president for academic affairs at the Marine Corps University.

In 2018, Anderson was nominated to serve as Assistant Secretary of Defense for Strategy, Plans, and Capabilities. On August 28, 2018, the U.S. Senate confirmed him by Voice Vote. On March 1, 2020, Anderson was selected to serve as acting Under Secretary of Defense for Policy after the resignation of John Rood. On June 6, the U.S. Senate confirmed him as Deputy Under Secretary of Defense for Policy by a vote of 78–17.

Anderson resigned November 10, 2020, the day after Secretary Mark Esper was fired. He is the recipient of several professional awards, to include the Department of Defense Medal for Distinguished Public Service (November 2020).
