= Under Secretary of Defense for Policy =

United States government position

- Seal of the Department of Defense

- Flag of an under secretary of defense

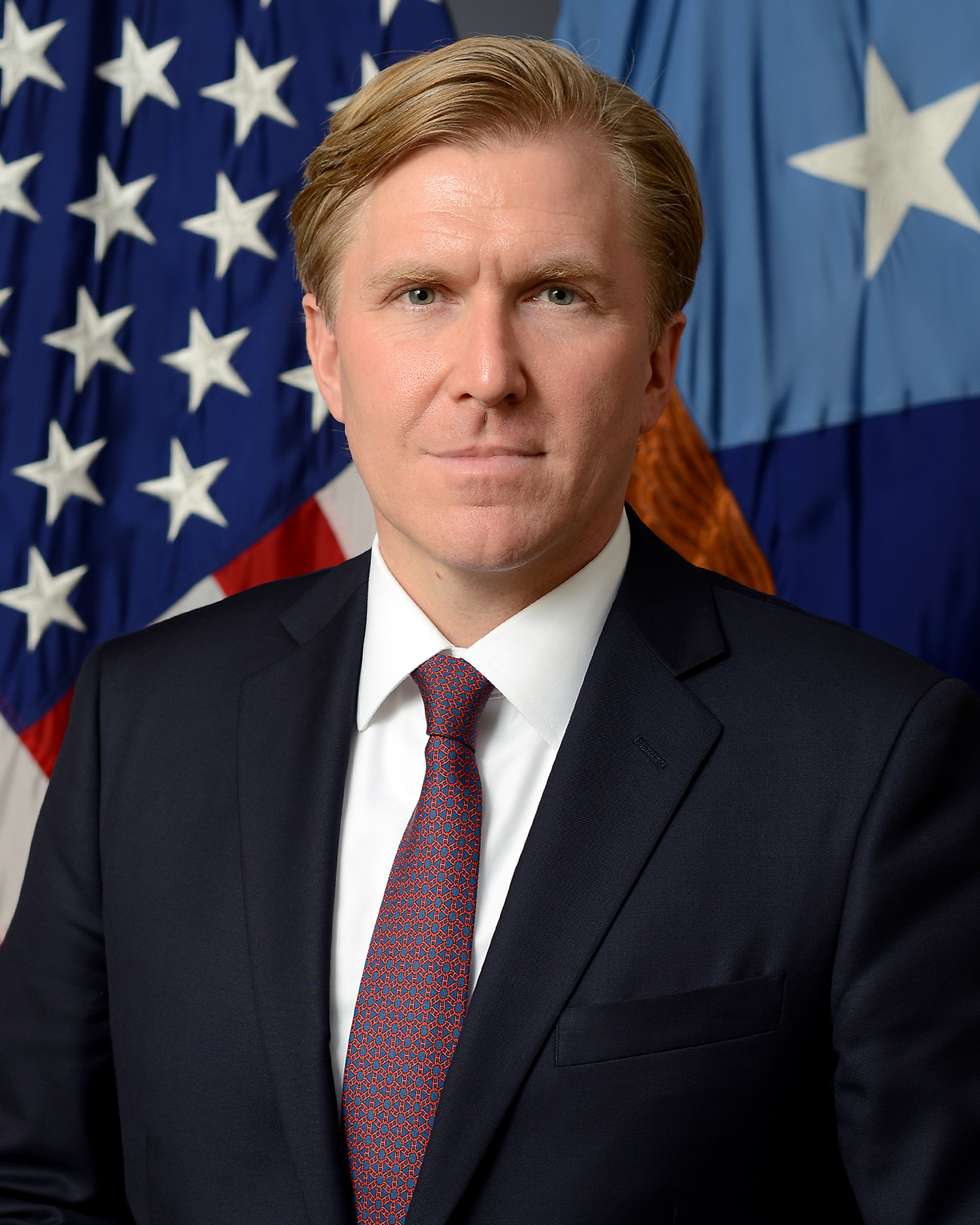
- Incumbent; Elbridge Colby since 9 April 2025
- United States Department of Defense; Office of the Secretary of Defense
- Style: Mr. Under Secretary
- Reports to: Secretary of Defense; Deputy Secretary of Defense
- Appointer: The president with Senate advice and consent
- Term length: No fixed term
- Formation: 1978
- First holder: Stanley Rogers Resor
- Succession: 5th in SecDef succession
- Deputy: Principal Deputy Under Secretary of Defense for Policy
- Salary: Executive Schedule, level III
- Website: policy.defense.gov

The United States under secretary of defense for policy (USDP) is a high level civilian official in the United States Department of Defense. The under secretary of defense for policy is the principal staff assistant and adviser to both the secretary of defense and the deputy secretary of defense for all matters concerning the formation of national security and defense policy.

The under secretary is normally appointed from civilian life by the president with the advice and consent of the Senate.

== Overview ==
The Office of the Under Secretary of Defense for Policy is the principal staff element of the secretary of defense in the exercise of policy development, planning, resource management, fiscal, and program evaluation responsibilities, the rank of Under Secretary, the USD(P) is a Level III position within the Executive Schedule.

== Reporting officials ==
Officials reporting to the USD(P) include:

- Principal deputy under secretary of defense for policy

=== Strategy, plans, and capabilities ===
The assistant secretary of defense for strategy, plans, and capabilities (ASD(SPC)) is responsible for national security and defense strategy, leading the National Defense Strategy, emerging capabilities, security cooperation plans and policies, and force design and development planning.

- The deputy assistant secretary of defense for force development and emerging capabilities provides advice advancing the force development priorities of the Secretary of Defense for implementing the defense strategy, including by devising, facilitating issuance of, and overseeing DoD Component compliance with force planning and programming guidance to balance Joint Force capability, capacity, and readiness for DoD's primary defense missions and emerging security challenges.
- The deputy assistant secretary of defense for global partnerships provides advice on developing policy for security cooperation, humanitarian assistance, and international humanitarian affairs.
- The deputy assistant secretary of defense for plans and posture provides advice on developing and implementing policy, strategic guidance, and oversight of the Department of Defense’s (DoD) operational planning and overseas posture.
- The deputy assistant secretary of defense for strategy provides advice on developing the Department’s national defense strategy and for ensuring that the Department’s program and budget decisions support implementation of the strategy.

=== International security affairs ===
The assistant secretary of defense for international security affairs (ASD (ISA)) is responsible for international security strategy, defense policy, and oversight of security cooperation programs and foreign military sales programs relating to Europe, the North Atlantic Treaty Organization, Russia, Eurasia, the Middle East, Africa, and the Western Hemisphere.

- The deputy assistant secretary of defense for African affairs provides advice on international security strategy, defense policy, and oversight of security cooperation programs relating to Africa.
- The deputy assistant secretary of defense for the Middle East provides advice on international security strategy, defense policy, and oversight of security cooperation programs relating to the Middle East and Central Asia.
- The deputy assistant secretary of defense for Europe and NATO provides advice on international security strategy, defense policy, and oversight of security cooperation programs relating to Europe and NATO.
- The deputy assistant secretary of defense for Russia, Ukraine, and Eurasia provides advice on international security strategy, defense policy, and oversight of security cooperation programs relating to conventional arms control, Russia, Ukraine, Western Balkans, and Eurasian nations.
- The secretary of defense representative in the United States Mission to NATO.
- The secretary of defense representative to the Organization for Security and Co-operation in Europe.

=== Homeland defense and hemispheric affairs ===
The assistant secretary of defense for homeland defense and hemispheric affairs (ASD(HD&HA)) is responsible for the policy, strategy, and implementation guidance for national and global security issues across countering weapons of mass destruction, cyber operations, homeland defense activities, antiterrorism, continuity of government and mission assurance, and defense support to civil authorities. The ASD(HD&HA) is also responsible for the Protected Critical Infrastructure Program (PCII), the Domestic Preparedness Support Initiative, and the Defense Critical Infrastructure Program (DCIP).

- The deputy assistant secretary of defense for countering weapons of mass destruction is responsible for the policy and guidance for chemical, biological, radiological, and nuclear protection, weapons of mass destruction countermeasures, and counterproliferation and non-proliferation.
- The deputy assistant secretary of defense for homeland defense integration and defense support of civil authorities is responsible for the development, coordination, and oversight of the integration and implementation of plans and policy for defense support of civil authorities and civil-military co-operation.
- The deputy assistant secretary of defense for defense continuity and mission assurance is responsible for the development of policies and plans for continuity of government, mission assurance, counterterrorism, emergency management, and critical infrastructure protection.

=== Special operations and low-intensity conflict ===
The assistant secretary of defense for special operations/low-intensity conflict (ASD(SO/LIC)) is responsible for the policy, resources, strategic capabilities and force transformation, and oversight of special operations and low-intensity conflict matters of the United States Department of Defense across counterterrorism, unconventional warfare, direct action, special reconnaissance, foreign internal defense, civil affairs, information and psychological operations, and counterproliferation of weapons of mass destruction.

- The deputy assistant secretary of defense for counternarcotics and global threats is responsible for the policy, resources, strategic capabilities and force transformation, and oversight of special capabilities for counternarcotics and global threats.
- The deputy assistant secretary of defense for stability and humanitarian affairs is responsible for the policy, resources, strategic capabilities and force transformation, and oversight of conflict stabilization activities, peace operations, and humanitarian relief efforts.
- The deputy assistant secretary of defense for special operations and combatting terrorism is responsible for the policy, resources, strategic capabilities and force transformation, and oversight of counterterrorism, counterinsurgency, foreign internal defense, and psychological operations as well as providing staff oversight of the United States Special Operations Command resources, budget, and program development issues.

=== Indo-Pacific security affairs ===
The assistant secretary of defense for Indo-Pacific security affairs (ASD(IPSA)) is responsible for international security strategy, defense policy, and oversight of security cooperation programs relating to the Indo-Pacific region.

- The deputy assistant secretary of defense for East Asia provides advice on international security strategy, defense policy, and oversight of security cooperation programs relating to Taiwan, Mongolia, Japan, South Korea, and North Korea.
- The deputy assistant secretary of defense for China provides advice on international security strategy, defense policy, and bilateral security relations relating to China (Including Hong Kong).
- The deputy assistant secretary of defense for South and Southeast Asia provides advice on international security strategy, defense policy, and oversight of security cooperation programs relating to India, Bangladesh, Bhutan, Diego Garcia (in conjunction with ASD(ISA)), Maldives, Nepal, Sri Lanka, Brunei, Burma, Cambodia, East Timor, Indonesia, Laos, Malaysia, Philippines, Singapore, Thailand, Vietnam, Australia, New Zealand, Papua New Guinea, and the Pacific Islands nations.
- The deputy assistant secretary of defense for Afghanistan, Pakistan, and Central Asia provides advice on international security strategy, defense policy, and oversight of security cooperation programs relating to Afghanistan, Pakistan, Kazakhstan, Kyrgyzstan, Tajikistan, Turkmenistan, and Uzbekistan.

=== Space policy ===
The assistant secretary of defense for space policy (ASD(SP)) is responsible for the overall supervision of DoD policy for space warfighting, encompassing the Department’s strategic capabilities for integrated deterrence: space, nuclear weapons, cyber, missile defense, electromagnetic warfare, and countering weapons of mass destruction. Additionally, this position served as the Principal Cyber Advisor to the Secretary of Defense.

- The deputy assistant secretary of defense for nuclear and cwmd policy provides advice on developing strategies, informing policies, and conducting oversight of nuclear deterrence policy and arms control, as well as developing and overseeing the implementation of strategies and policies of all countering weapons of mass destruction policy issues.
- The deputy assistant secretary of defense for cyber policy provides advice on establishing DoD cyberspace policy and strategy, providing guidance and oversight on DoD cyberspace activities, and managing DoD’s primary external relationships across the U.S. government, key domestic stakeholders, and our allies and partners.
- The deputy assistant secretary of defense for space and missile defense provides advice on space and integrated air and missile defense posture and policies.
- The deputy principal cyber advisor provides advice on military cyber forces and activities and the implementation of the cyber strategy and execution of the cyber posture review.

=== Defense POW/MIA Accounting Agency ===
The director of the Defense POW/MIA Accounting Agency is responsible for the personnel recovery of United States Department of Defense personnel who are listed as prisoners of war (POW) or missing in action (MIA), from all past wars and conflicts around the world.

=== Defense Security Cooperation Agency ===
The director of the Defense Security Cooperation Agency is responsible for providing allies and partner nations with financial and technical assistance, transfer of defense matériel, training, and the promotion of military-to-military contacts.

=== Defense Technology Security Administration ===
The director of the Defense Technology Security Administration is responsible for the formulation and enforcement of technology security policies related to international transfers of defense-related goods, services, and technologies.

== Budget ==
=== Budget features ===
- Defense Critical Infrastructure Program (DCIP): Oversees policy formulation and strategic planning for the Defense Critical Infrastructure Program, to include the Defense Industrial Base, which provides defense-related products and services that are essential to equip; mobilize; deploy and sustain military operations, enabling the Warfighter to minimize risk. Ensures the resiliency of networked infrastructure assets, whether owned or operated by the DoD or private industry, that are critical to executing military missions. Activities include the identification, assessment, monitoring, and risk management of cyber and physical infrastructure assets critical to the execution of the National Military Strategy. DCIP is run under the auspices of the Office of the Assistant Secretary of Defense for Homeland Defense and Americas' Security Affairs, where it is overseen by the DASD, Homeland Defense Strategy and Force Planning.
- Global Threat Management: Provides policy, guidance and oversight on existential threats, supranational threats and non-state actor threats. OUSD(P) fulfills this global mission by crafting and implementing initiatives to expand cultural understanding throughout the world in governed and ungoverned areas to aid in preventing the expansion of terrorist cells. Utilizes table top exercises to enable Members of Congress, Administration Officials, and DoD personnel to form strategies in addressing catastrophic security events. Active research and involvement in the ever-changing cyber environment to protect security assets and prevent sophisticated threats in cyberspace from adversaries domestic and foreign. This funding appears to primarily support the programs of the Office of the Assistant Secretary of Defense for Global Strategic Affairs.
- Homeland Defense Support Activities: Formulates policy and conducts DoD strategic planning for homeland defense and defense support of civil authorities, including installation preparedness; CBRNE preparedness and consequence management; border security and National Security Special Events. Supports the U.S. Northern Command in homeland defense strategy, and enhances the U.S. Southern Command mission through engagement with the ministries of defense of Western Hemisphere nations. It supervises intradepartmental and inter-agency coordination of the above issues. Conducts oversight of DoD processes to exercise force readiness through the National Exercise Program. Manages defense continuity and conducts crisis management. This funding appears to primarily support the programs of the Office of the Assistant Secretary of Defense for Homeland Defense and Americas' Security Affairs.
- Policy Planning and Integration: OUSD(P) coordinates activities to aid in formulating strategies for DoD programs at national and international levels. This involves establishing and monitoring strategic direction, planning and force development as laid out in reporting documents such as the Quadrennial Defense Review (QDR) and Defense Planning and Programming Guidance (DPPG). OUSD(P) ensures decisions are not made in a vacuum by integrating policies and resources related to humanitarian efforts and their compliance with international laws. Initiates crisis decision-making in an interagency setting; creates forums to explore emerging national security issues; and examines the capabilities and limitations of national power through various instruments. Funding allows interagency integration and coordination to determine requirements for potential dual-use application of Defense assets.
- Regional Security Affairs: Provides analysis of management of cultural situations in nation states and oversight to military joint ventures and cooperative DoD-Foreign government programs including educational, training, and developmental opportunities. Using a variety of resources, maintains regional expertise to support DoD leadership in forming and implementing strategies and contributes to coordinating holistic government engagement in programs and policies. Regional expertise provides the ability to: monitor and solve security cooperation issues, effectively execute coalition management, monitor international security operations, and further develop cooperative relations with foreign countries. This funding appears to primarily support the programs of the Office of the Assistant Secretary of Defense for Asian and Pacific Security Affairs and Office of the Assistant Secretary of Defense for International Security Affairs
- Rewards Program: Provides funds to publicize the program and pay rewards for information to disrupt international terrorist activities.
- Travel: This funding supports travel in support of the OUSD(P) mission.
- US Mission to NATO: Funding provides regional stability interface with US allies, NATO resolution of regional conflicts, response to terrorism and unstable conditions in fragile and failed nation states that include NATO involvement, weapons of mass destruction bilateral measures, and support of overseas facilities.
- Warfighting Support Activities: OUSD(P) provides resources to orchestrate the development of special technologies and capabilities. It sustains these efforts by conducting in-depth analyses of the assignment of additional military and civilian personnel to long-term, non-intelligence positions in high-priority countries. Prepares the military for confronting threats in culturally diverse countries, supports policies and strategies that develop skills unique to counterinsurgency and stabilization efforts; reinforces and builds international support over shared security concerns, homeland security, counterterrorism and other critical nation alliances, and promotes humanitarian activities through military resources in a non-combative manner. Provides funds to pay rewards for information to disrupt international terrorist activities and enhance US security capabilities. This funding appears to primarily support the programs of the Office of the Assistant Secretary of Defense for Special Operations/Low Intensity Conflict & Interdependent Capabilities

== List of under secretaries of defense for policy ==
No.	Portrait	Under Secretary	Took office	Left office	Time in office	Secretary of Defense	President	Ref(s)
1	Stanley Rogers Resor	Stanley Rogers Resor	14 August 1978	1 April 1979	230 days	Harold Brown	Jimmy Carter	-
2	Robert Komer	Robert Komer	24 October 1979	20 January 1981	1 year, 88 days	Harold Brown	Jimmy Carter	-
3	Fred Iklé	Fred Iklé	2 April 1981	19 February 1988	6 years, 323 days	Caspar Weinberger; Frank Carlucci	Ronald Reagan	-
4	Paul Wolfowitz	Paul Wolfowitz	15 May 1989	19 January 1993	3 years, 249 days	Dick Cheney	George H. W. Bush	-
5	Frank G. Wisner	Frank G. Wisner	6 July 1993	9 June 1994	338 days	Les Aspin; William Perry	Bill Clinton	-
6	Walter B. Slocombe	Walter B. Slocombe	15 September 1994	19 January 2001	6 years, 126 days	William Perry; William Cohen	Bill Clinton	-
-	Peter F. Verga	Peter F. Verga; Acting	20 January 2001	16 July 2001	177 days	Donald Rumsfeld	George W. Bush	-
7	Douglas J. Feith	Douglas J. Feith	16 July 2001	8 August 2005	4 years, 23 days	Donald Rumsfeld	George W. Bush	-
8	Eric S. Edelman	Eric S. Edelman	9 February 2006	20 January 2009	2 years, 346 days	Donald Rumsfeld; Robert Gates	George W. Bush	-
9	Michèle Flournoy	Michèle Flournoy	9 February 2009	3 February 2012	2 years, 359 days	Robert Gates; Leon Panetta	Barack Obama	
9	James N. Miller	James N. Miller	18 February 2012	8 January 2014	1 year, 324 days	Leon Panetta; Chuck Hagel	Barack Obama	-
-	Michael D. Lumpkin	Michael D. Lumpkin; Acting	9 January 2014	23 June 2014	165 days	Chuck Hagel	Barack Obama	-
10	Christine Wormuth	Christine Wormuth	23 June 2014	10 June 2016	1 year, 353 days	Chuck Hagel; Ash Carter	Barack Obama	-
-	Brian P. McKeon	Brian P. McKeon; Acting	10 June 2016	20 January 2017	224 days	Ash Carter	Barack Obama	-
-	Theresa Whelan	Theresa Whelan; Acting	20 January 2017	7 June 2017	138 days	James Mattis	Donald Trump	
-	Robert Karem	Robert Karem; Acting	7 June 2017	27 October 2017	142 days	James Mattis	Donald Trump	-
-	David Trachtenberg	David Trachtenberg; Acting	27 October 2017	8 January 2018	73 days	James Mattis	Donald Trump	-
11	John Rood	John Rood	9 January 2018	28 February 2020	2 years, 50 days	James Mattis; Mark Esper	Donald Trump	-
-	James Anderson	James Anderson; Acting	1 March 2020	10 November 2020	254 days	Mark Esper	Donald Trump	
-	Anthony Tata	Anthony Tata; Acting	10 November 2020	20 January 2021	71 days	Christopher C. Miller (acting)	Donald Trump	
-	Thomas Williams	Thomas Williams; Acting	15 January 2021	20 January 2021	5 days	Christopher C. Miller (acting)	Donald Trump	
-	Amanda J. Dory	Amanda J. Dory; Acting	20 January 2021	28 April 2021	98 days	Lloyd Austin	Joe Biden	-
12	Colin Kahl	Colin Kahl	28 April 2021	17 July 2023	2 years, 80 days	Lloyd Austin	Joe Biden	-
-	Sasha Baker	Sasha Baker; Acting	18 July 2023	26 April 2024	283 days	Lloyd Austin	Joe Biden	-
-	Amanda J. Dory	Amanda J. Dory; Acting	27 April 2024	22 January 2025	270 days	Lloyd Austin	Joe Biden	-
-	Alexander Velez-Green	Alexander Velez-Green; Acting	22 January 2025	9 April 2025	77 days	Pete Hegseth	Donald Trump	-
13	Elbridge Colby	Elbridge Colby	9 April 2025	Incumbent	1 year, 152 days	Pete Hegseth	Donald Trump	-

== Principal Deputy ==
The Principal Deputy Under Secretary of Defense for Policy is the chief staff assistant to the USD(P). Originally established as the Deputy Under Secretary of Defense (Policy) by the National Defense Authorization Act for FY 1992–93 (P.L. 102–190), the post was re-designated Principal Deputy Under Secretary of Defense (Policy), or PDUSD(P) in December 1999 by DoD Directive 5111.3. The PDUSD(P) provides advice and assistance to the Secretary of Defense, Deputy Secretary of Defense, and USD(P) on national security policy, military strategy, and defense policy.

No.	Portrait	Deputy Under Secretary	Took office	Left office	Time in office	Secretary of Defense	President	Ref(s)
1	I. Lewis Libby	I. Lewis Libby	12 August 1992	10 January 1993	151 days	Paul Wolfowitz; Dick Cheney	George H. W. Bush	-
2	Walter B. Slocombe	Walter B. Slocombe	1 June 1993	14 September 1994	1 year, 105 days	Les Aspin; William J. Perry	Bill Clinton	-
3	Jan M. Lodal	Jan M. Lodal	3 October 1994	30 September 1998	3 years, 362 days	William J. Perry; William S. Cohen	Bill Clinton	-
4	James M. Bodner	James M. Bodner	1 October 1998	19 January 2001	2 years, 110 days	William S. Cohen	Bill Clinton	-
5	Stephen A. Cambone	Stephen A. Cambone	25 July 2001	1 July 2002	341 days	Donald H. Rumsfeld	George W. Bush	-
5	Christopher Ryan Henry	Christopher Ryan Henry	7 February 2003	30 September 2008	5 years, 236 days	Donald H. Rumsfeld; Robert M. Gates	George W. Bush	-
-	Peter F. Verga	Peter F. Verga; Acting	1 October 2008	1 April 2009	182 days	Robert M. Gates	George W. Bush; Barack Obama	-
6	James N. Miller	James N. Miller	2 April 2009	24 May 2012	3 years, 52 days	Robert M. Gates	Barack Obama	-
7	Kathleen Hicks	Kathleen Hicks	24 May 2012	2 July 2013	1 year, 39 days	Chuck Hagel	Barack Obama	-
8	Brian P. McKeon	Brian P. McKeon	28 July 2014	10 June 2016	1 year, 318 days	Ash Carter	Barack Obama	-
-	David B. Shear	David B. Shear; Acting	10 June 2016	20 January 2017	224 days	Ash Carter	Barack Obama	-
9	David Trachtenberg	David Trachtenberg	27 October 2017	19 July 2019	1 year, 265 days	James Mattis	Donald Trump	-
-	James Anderson	James Anderson; Acting	23 July 2019	24 April 2020	276 days	Mark Esper	Donald Trump	-
-	Daniel R. Green	Daniel R. Green; Acting	24 April 2020	8 June 2020	45 days	Mark Esper	Donald Trump	-
10	James Anderson	James Anderson	8 June 2020	10 November 2020	155 days	Mark Esper	Donald Trump	-
-	Thomas M. Williams	Thomas M. Williams; Acting	10 November 2020	20 January 2021	71 days	Christopher C. Miller (acting)	Donald Trump	-
-	Jennifer C. Walsh	Jennifer C. Walsh; Acting	20 January 2021	28 April 2021	98 days	Lloyd Austin	Joe Biden	-
-	Amanda J. Dory	Amanda J. Dory; Acting	29 April 2021	23 August 2021	116 days	Lloyd Austin	Joe Biden	-
-	Mara Karlin	Mara Karlin; Acting	23 August 2021	14 February 2022	175 days	Lloyd Austin	Joe Biden	-
11	Sasha Baker	Sasha Baker	14 February 2022	26 April 2024	2 years, 72 days	Lloyd Austin	Joe Biden	-
-	Mara Karlin	Mara Karlin; Acting	4 January 2023	24 April 2023	175 days	Lloyd Austin	Joe Biden	-
-	Mara Karlin	Mara Karlin; Acting	18 July 2023	20 December 2023	175 days	Lloyd Austin	Joe Biden	-
-	Melissa Dalton	Melissa Dalton; Acting	26 April 2024	29 May 2024	33 days	Lloyd Austin	Joe Biden	-
-	Cara L. Abercrombie	Cara L. Abercrombie; Acting	29 May 2024	20 January 2025	236 days	Lloyd Austin	Joe Biden	-
-	Amanda J. Dory	Amanda J. Dory; Acting	22 January 2025	17 March 2025	54 days	Pete Hegseth	Donald Trump	-
-	Austin Dahmer	Austin Dahmer; Acting	17 March 2025	Incumbent	1 year, 175 days	Pete Hegseth	Donald Trump	-
