= Colin Kahl =

American government official and academic (born 1971)

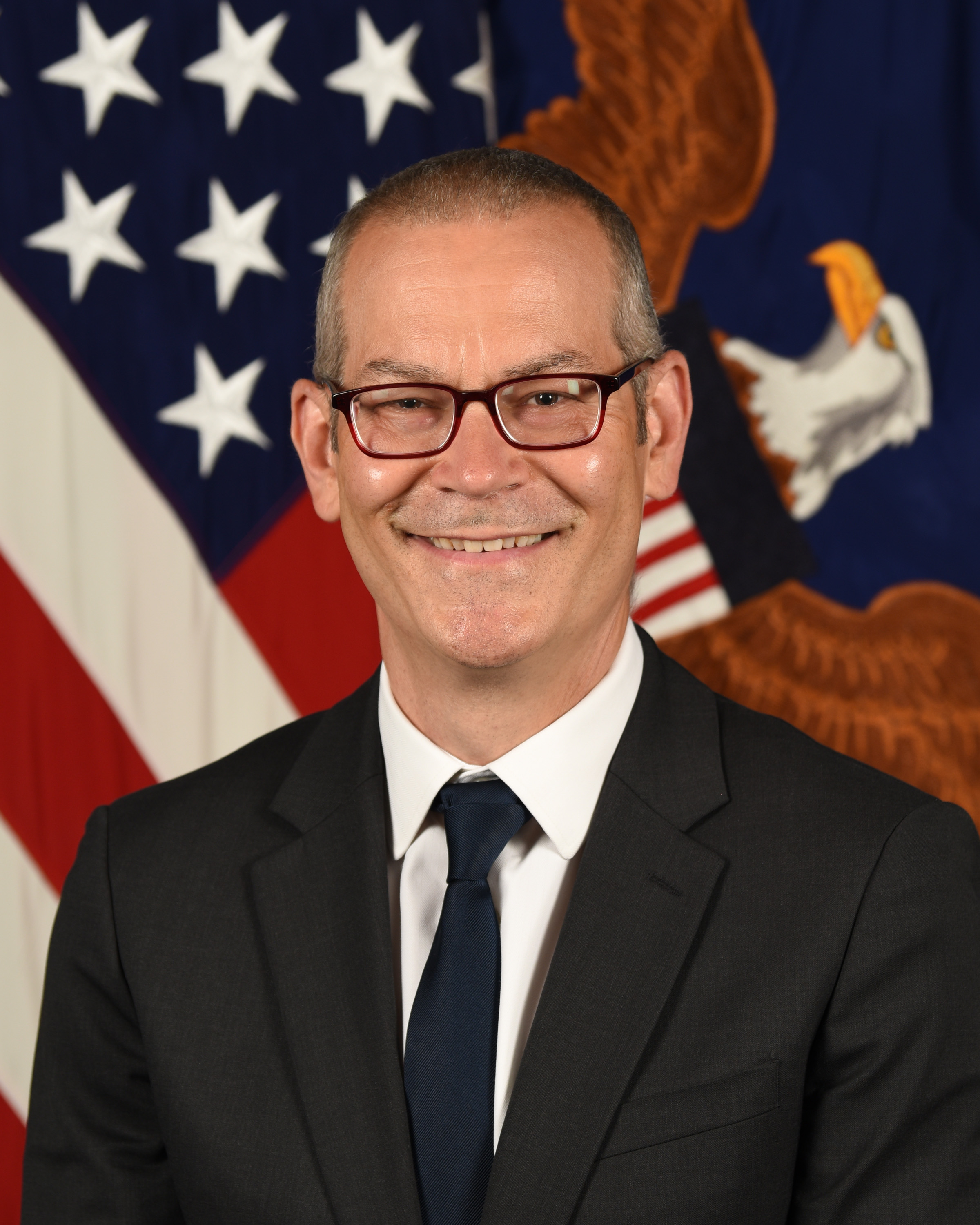
- Kahl in 2021

Under Secretary of Defense for Policy
- In office April 28, 2021 – July 17, 2023
- President: Joe Biden
- Preceded by: John Rood
- Succeeded by: Elbridge Colby

National Security Advisor to the Vice President
- In office August 1, 2014 – January 20, 2017
- Vice President: Joe Biden
- Preceded by: Jake Sullivan
- Succeeded by: Andrea L. Thompson

Personal details
- Born: Colin Hackett Kahl; June 1, 1971 (age 55) Michigan, U.S.
- Party: Democratic
- Education: University of Michigan (BA); Columbia University (PhD)

Colin Hackett Kahl is an American political scientist who served as under secretary of defense for policy in the Biden administration from April 28, 2021, to July 17, 2023. Previously, he served as national security advisor to the vice president under then-Vice President Joe Biden (2014–2017). After the Obama administration, Kahl served as a Steven C. Házy Senior Fellow at the Center for International Security and Cooperation (CISAC) at Stanford University. Since January 2026, Kahl is the Director of Stanford’s Freeman Spogli Institute (FSI) for International Studies, which includes CISAC.

In the Obama administration, Kahl was involved in the negotiations of the Joint Comprehensive Plan of Action, commonly known as the Iran nuclear deal. After leaving the administration, he was subject to disinformation campaigns, as well as private intelligence investigations by former Trump administration staff that targeted him, his wife and children.

== Early life and education ==
Kahl was born in Michigan but moved to the San Francisco Bay Area with his mother and brother in 1981. He was raised in Richmond, California. He graduated from John F. Kennedy High School in 1989. Kahl earned a BA in political science from the University of Michigan in 1993 and a PhD in political science from Columbia University in 2000. Under his advisors Robert Jervis and Jack Snyder, Kahl's doctoral thesis was entitled States, Scarcity, and Civil Strife in the Developing World [Kenya].

== Career ==
From 1997 to 1998, he was a national security fellow at Harvard University. From 2005 to 2006, he was a Council on Foreign Relations International Affairs Fellow, working on stability operations policy at the Department of Defense. He has been a professor at the University of Minnesota. Kahl has published in leading security studies journals, such as International Security and Security Studies, as well as Foreign Affairs.

=== Obama Administration ===
From 2009 to 2011, he was the deputy assistant secretary of defense for the Middle East in the Obama administration. In 2011, he was awarded the Secretary of Defense Medal for Outstanding Public Service by Secretary of Defense Robert Gates. In 2014, he became National Security Advisor to then-Vice President Joe Biden. In the Obama administration, Kahl was directly involved in negotiating the Iran Nuclear Deal, as well as publicly advocating for it.

In May 2018, it was revealed that aides to U.S. President Donald Trump had contracted with the Israeli private intelligence firm Black Cube to find evidence to support unsubstantiated and false claims that Kahl was being enriched by Iran lobbyists and that either he or deputy national security advisor Ben Rhodes were cheating on their wives.

=== Biden Administration ===
In November 2020, Kahl was named a member of the Joe Biden presidential transition Agency Review Team to support transition efforts related to the National Security Council.

Kahl was nominated by Biden to serve as the under secretary of defense for policy. His nomination was subject to controversy in the Senate, with the Republican caucus unanimously opposing his confirmation due to his support for the Iran nuclear deal, as well as for his criticisms of Trump administration policies. In 2021, 18 Republican United States Senators including Ted Cruz (R-Texas), Bill Hagerty (R-TN) and Tom Cotton (R-AR), alleged that Kahl might have publicly disclosed classified or sensitive national security information on social media, and demanded an FBI investigation. Experts on classification told Politico the Republican accusations against Kahl appeared to be politically motivated, asserting that the tweets did not appear to constitute a violation.

On March 4, 2021, the Senate's Armed Forces Committee held hearings on Kahl's nomination. The committee deadlocked on the nomination on March 24, 2021, therefore delaying his confirmation. The entire Senate voted to discharge Kahl's nomination from the committee in a 50–50 roll call vote; Vice President Kamala Harris was needed to break the tie. On April 27, 2021, Kahl was confirmed by a vote of 49–45, thanks in part to the absence of several Republican senators. He was sworn in the following day by Secretary of Defense Lloyd Austin.

In May 2023 it became known that Kahl would return to his role as a professor at Stanford University after being granted a two-year leave of absence.

In April 2024, Kahl joined the Truman National Security Project's board of directors.

Kahl was a member of the Defense Policy Board Advisory Committee. It was disbanded in April 2025.

== Publications ==
=== Books ===
- States, Scarcity, and Civil Strife in the Developing World, Princeton, N.J.; Woodstock: Princeton University Press, 2008. ISBN 9780691138350, OCLC 231587048
- Colin H. Kahl and Thomas J. Wright, Aftershocks: pandemic politics and the end of the old international order, New York: St. Martin's Publishing Group, 2021. ISBN 978-1-250-27574-5, OCLC 1227086712
