= Melissa Dalton =

American foreign policy and defense advisor

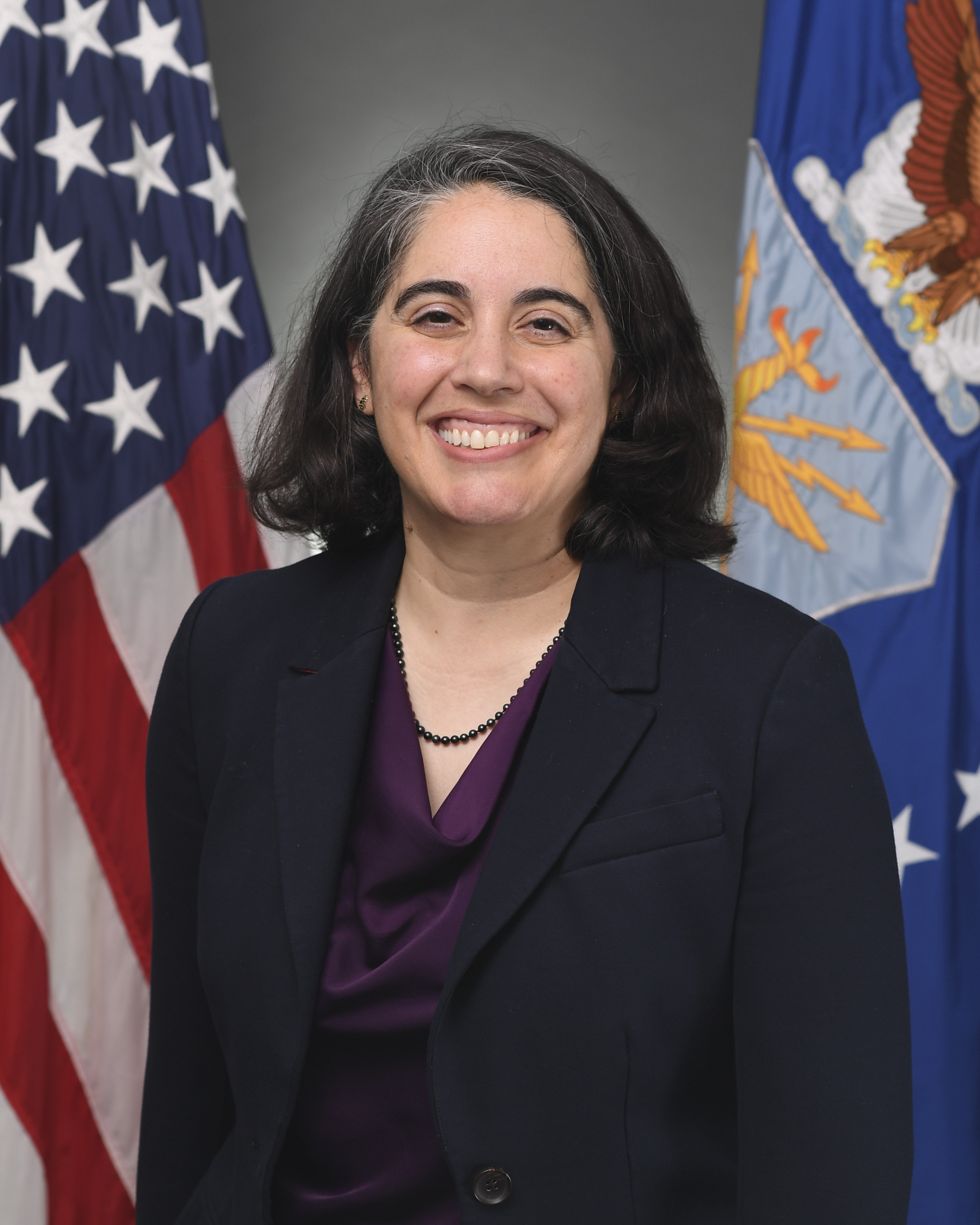
- Official portrait, 2024

28th United States Under Secretary of the Air Force
- In office May 29, 2024 – January 20, 2025
- President: Joe Biden
- Preceded by: Gina Ortiz Jones
- Succeeded by: Matthew L. Lohmeier

Principal Deputy Under Secretary of Defense for Policy
- Acting; December 21, 2023 – May 29, 2024
- President: Joe Biden
- Preceded by: Sasha Baker
- Succeeded by: Cara L. Abercrombie (acting)

Assistant Secretary of Defense for Homeland Defense and Hemispheric Affairs
- In office March 4, 2022 – May 29, 2024
- President: Joe Biden
- Preceded by: Kenneth Rapuano
- Succeeded by: Mark Ditlevson

Personal details
- Education: University of Virginia (BA); Johns Hopkins University (MA)

Melissa Griffin Dalton is an American defense official who served as the under secretary of the Air Force from 2024 to 2025. She previously served as the assistant secretary of defense for homeland defense and hemispheric affairs in the Biden administration.

== Education ==
Dalton earned a Bachelor of Arts degree in foreign affairs from the University of Virginia and a Master of Arts in international relations from the Paul H. Nitze School of Advanced International Studies at Johns Hopkins University.

== Career ==
Dalton began her career as an intelligence analyst at the Defense Intelligence Agency. She then joined the Office of the Under Secretary of Defense for Policy, where she specialized in policy related to Syria and Lebanon. She also served as a senior advisor to the commander of the International Security Assistance Force in Kabul. After serving in United States Department of Defense during the Bush and Obama administrations, she joined the Center for Strategic and International Studies as a senior fellow and deputy director. In January 2021, Dalton was selected to serve as principal deputy assistant secretary of defense for strategy, plans, and capabilities. In July 2021, Dalton was selected to manage the Nuclear Posture Review.

=== Biden administration ===
Dalton was nominated to serve as assistant secretary of defense for homeland defense and Americas' security affairs in August 2021. Hearings were held on her nomination on January 13, 2022 by the Senate's Armed Services Committee. On February 1, 2022, the committee reported her nomination favorably. Dalton was officially confirmed by the Senate on March 1, 2022, and started her position on March 4, 2022.

In September 2023, Dalton was nominated to serve as under secretary of the Air Force. Dalton was officially confirmed by the Senate on May 23, 2024, beginning the job immediately and serving to the end of Biden's term.
