= Paul McHale =

American politician (born 1950)

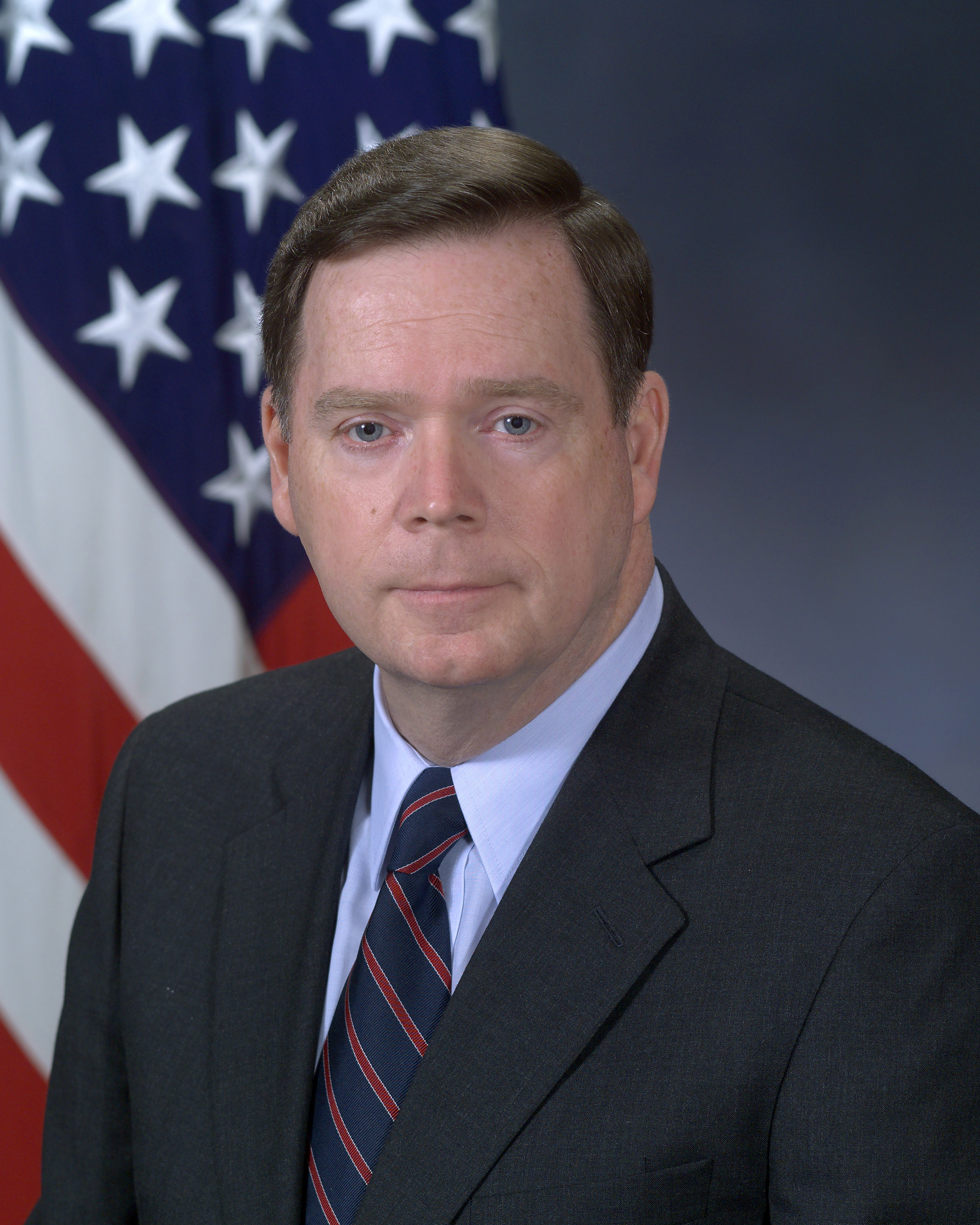

Assistant Secretary of Defense for Homeland Defense
- In office February 7, 2003 – January 20, 2009
- President: George W. Bush
- Preceded by: Position established
- Succeeded by: Paul N. Stockton

Member of the U.S. House of Representatives from Pennsylvania's 15th district
- In office January 3, 1993 – January 3, 1999
- Preceded by: Donald L. Ritter
- Succeeded by: Pat Toomey

Member of the Pennsylvania House of Representatives from the 133rd district
- In office January 1983 – February 25, 1991
- Preceded by: George Kanuck
- Succeeded by: Katherine McHale

Personal details
- Born: Paul Francis McHale Jr. July 26, 1950 (age 75) Bethlehem, Pennsylvania, U.S.
- Party: Democratic
- Spouse(s): Katherine Pecka (divorced) Martha Rainville
- Education: Lehigh University (BA); Georgetown University (JD); Maynooth University (MA)

Military service
- Branch/service: United States Marine Corps; United States Marine Corps Reserve
- Years of service: 1972–1974 (active); 1974–2007 (reserve)
- Rank: Colonel
- Battles/wars: Gulf War; War in Afghanistan
- Awards: Bronze Star; Legion of Merit; Meritorious Service Medal; Navy Commendation Medal (2); Department of Defense Medal for Distinguished Public Service

Paul Francis McHale Jr. (born July 26, 1950) is a retired American lawyer and politician as well as a United States Marine. From 2003 to 2009, he served as the Assistant Secretary of Defense for Homeland Defense. From 1993 to 1999, he represented Pennsylvania's 15th congressional district in the United States House of Representatives.

McHale was the founder and former president of Civil Support International LLC (2010-2020), a consulting firm that advised private contractors, academic institutions and government agencies in matters related to disaster preparedness, crisis response, homeland defense and homeland security. He retired from law and business in 2020 in order to pursue a master’s degree in Military History and Strategic Studies at Maynooth University.

== Education and military service ==
McHale was born in Bethlehem, Pennsylvania, where he graduated from Liberty High School.

McHale received a Bachelor of Arts (Government, Highest Honors) from Lehigh University in 1972, a J.D. from Georgetown University Law Center in 1977, and a Master of Arts (Military History and Strategic Studies, First Class Honors) from Maynooth University in 2022. He enlisted in the United States Marine Corps in 1972, retiring from the Marine Corps Reserve with the rank of colonel in 2007. McHale served combat tours in Saudi Arabia (Desert Shield, 1990), Kuwait (Desert Storm, 1991), and Afghanistan (Enduring Freedom, 2007). His personal military decorations include the Bronze Star, the Legion of Merit, the Meritorious Service Medal and the Navy Commendation Medal (2nd award).

In October 2006, McHale was recalled to active Marine Corps duty to deploy to Afghanistan. For McHale's service as both a Congressman and Assistant Secretary of Defense, McHale was awarded the DoD Distinguished Public Service Medal – the department's highest civilian honor – by three successive Secretaries of Defense.

== Politics ==
McHale was a member of the Pennsylvania House of Representatives from 1983 to 1991, resigning in order to volunteer for active duty in the Gulf War. In 1992, he ran for Congress and defeated 14-year incumbent Don Ritter in a major upset, with the support of significant numbers of Democratic, Republican and Independent voters in the Lehigh Valley.

While serving in Congress, McHale was an active member of the House Armed Services Committee and he co-founded the National Guard and Reserve Components Caucus.

McHale gained prominence in 1998 when he called for Bill Clinton to resign. He voted for three of the four articles of impeachment against Clinton. He was one of only five Democrats who voted for at least one article, and had by far the most liberal voting record of those who supported impeachment. The other four Democrats who voted for at least one article were Virgil Goode, Ralph Hall, Charlie Stenholm, and Gene Taylor, all of whom had very conservative voting records. Goode, Hall and Taylor subsequently became Republicans, while McHale served in the Bush administration.

== Legal career ==
McHale began representing Panda Energy International in 1999, after the completion of his term in the U.S. House of Representatives, during Panda's legal and public relations battles which took place in his former congressional district.

== Assistant Secretary of Defense ==
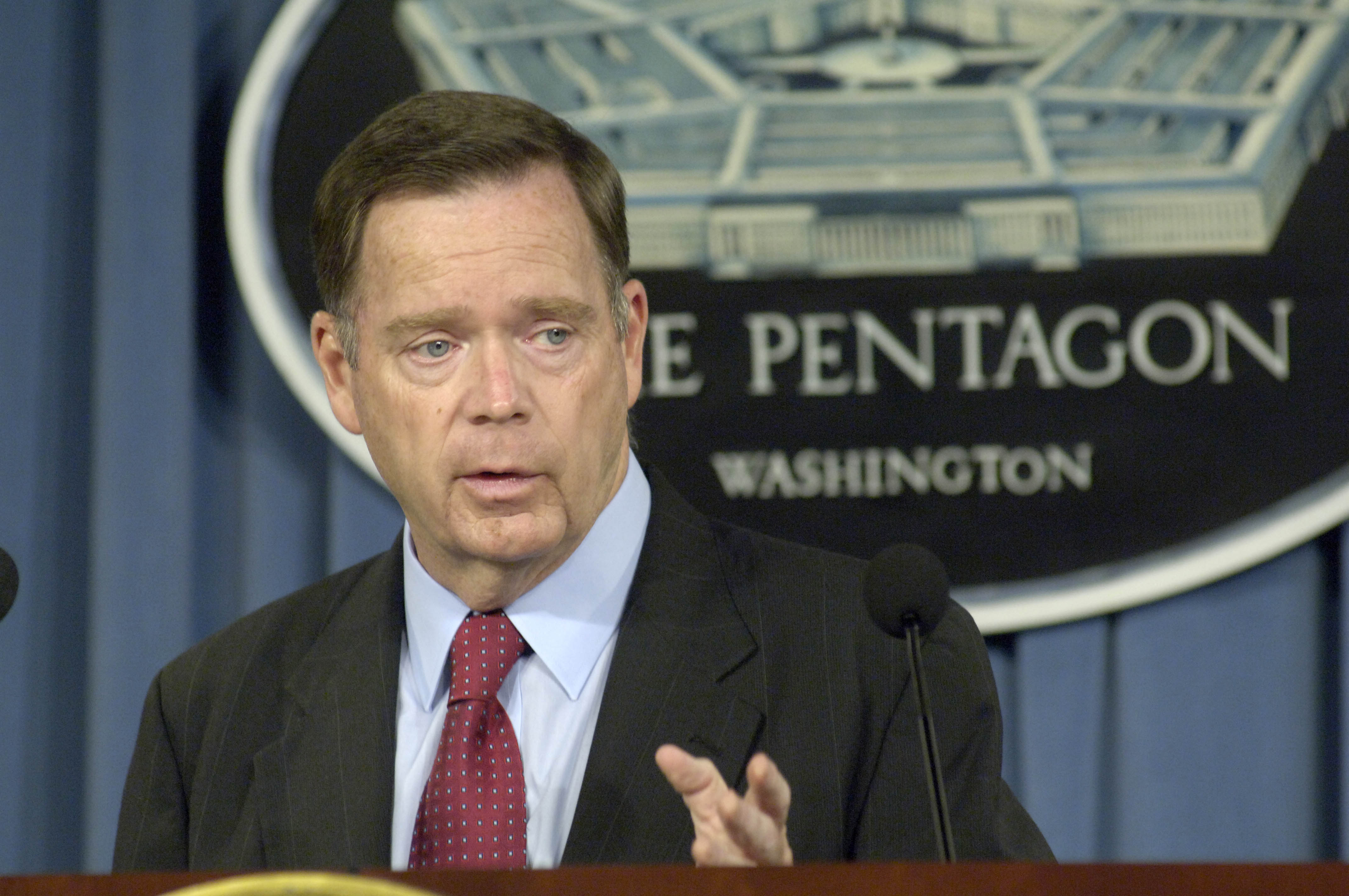
McHale briefing at The Pentagon during the October 2007 California wildfires

Nominated by President George W. Bush, McHale was confirmed by the U.S. Senate and assumed his position as Assistant Secretary of Defense (ASD) for Homeland Defense (HD) on February 7, 2003. The first to hold this position, McHale supervised all homeland defense activities for the U.S. Department of Defense and represented the Department at the highest levels of U.S. domestic crisis planning. He left DoD in January 2009 at the end of the George W. Bush administration.

As Assistant Secretary of Defense, McHale was responsible for senior civilian oversight of two geographic combatant commands, Northern Command and Southern Command, as well as DoD Western Hemisphere policy affairs, Defense Support of Civil Authorities (DSCA), and the transfer of technologies to homeland security use pursuant to Section 1401 of the 2003 National Defense Authorization Act.

== Personal life ==
He is married to Major General Martha Rainville, the first woman in the history of the U.S. National Guard to serve as a state Adjutant General and a former congressional candidate from Vermont. He has three children Matthew, Mary, and Luke McHale from a previous marriage to Katherine Pecka McHale.

== See also ==
- List of United States political appointments that crossed party lines

U.S. House of Representatives
Preceded by Donald L. Ritter	Member of the U.S. House of Representatives from Pennsylvania's 15th congressional district 1993–1999	Succeeded by Pat Toomey
U.S. order of precedence (ceremonial)
Preceded by Thomas B. Evans Jr. as Former U.S. Representative	Order of precedence of the United States as Former U.S. Representative	Succeeded by Joe Hoeffel as Former U.S. Representative
