= Pennsylvania House of Representatives, District 133 =

American legislative district

Pennsylvania's 133rd State House of Representatives district
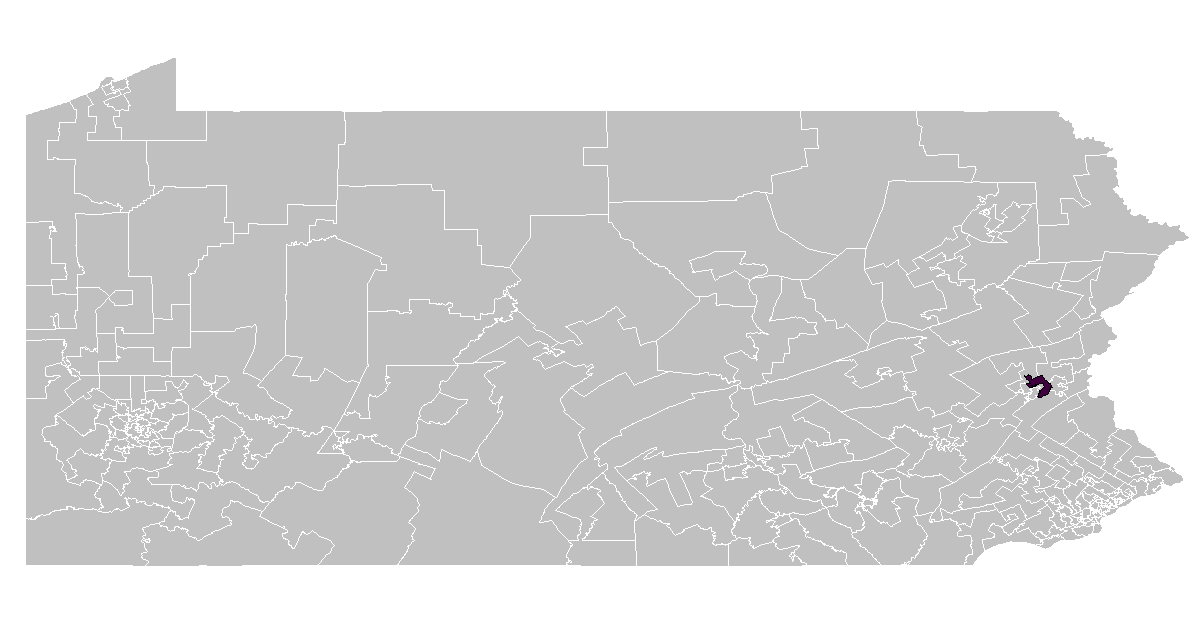
Representative
Jeanne McNeill; D–Bethlehem
- Demographics: 83.6% White; 5.4% Black; 13.5% Hispanic
- Population (2011) • Citizens of voting age: 61,468; 49,051

The 133rd Pennsylvania House of Representatives District is located in Southeastern Pennsylvania and has been represented since a special election in 2018 by Jeanne McNeill.

== District profile ==
The 133rd Pennsylvania House of Representatives District is located within Lehigh County. It is made up of the following areas:

- Bethlehem (Lehigh County portion)
- Catasauqua
- Coplay
- Fountain Hill
- Hanover Township
- Whitehall Township

== Representatives ==
Representative	Party	Years	District home	Note
Prior to 1969, seats were apportioned by county.
William H. Eckensberger, Jr.	Democrat	1969 – 1976	Cementon, Pennsylvania	Did not seek reelection in 1976; Currently an attorney in Allentown, Pennsylvania
Frank J. Meluskey	Democrat	1977 – 1978	Bethlehem, Pennsylvania	Reelected to a 1979 term; Died November 22, 1978
George J. Kanuck	Republican	1979 – 1982	Allentown, Pennsylvania	Resigned May 6, 1982
Paul F. McHale, Jr.	Democrat	1983 – 1991	Bethlehem, Pennsylvania	Resigned February 25, 1991, to volunteer to serve active duty in the Gulf War; Elected to House of Representatives to represent Pennsylvania's 15th Congressional District from 1993 to 1999; Served as Assistant Secretary of Defense for Homeland Defense from 2003 to 2009; President of Civil Support International, LLC from 2009 to present
Katherine McHale	Democrat	1991 – 1992	Bethlehem, Pennsylvania	Elected May 21, 1991, to fill vacancy left by Paul McHale; Did not run for 1992 reelection
T. J. Rooney	Democrat	1993 – 2006	Fountain Hill, Pennsylvania	Chairman of the Pennsylvania Democratic Party from 2003 to 2010
Joseph F. Brennan	Democrat	2007 – 2012	Fountain Hill, Pennsylvania	Won the 2012 Democratic Primary, however, withdrew his consideration he was charged with drunk-driving and assault; Daniel T. McNeill replaced him in the 2012 general election against Republican David Molony
Daniel T. McNeill	Democrat	2013 – 2017	Whitehall, Pennsylvania	Died September 8, 2017. A special election was held on December 5, 2017, to fill his seat. Candidates included McNeill's widow, Democrat Jeanne McNeill, Republican David Molony, and Libertarian Samantha Dorney
Jeanne McNeill	Democrat	2018 – present	Whitehall, Pennsylvania	Incumbent. Won the 133rd District special election on December 5, 2017, to fill the seat of her widow, the late Daniel T. McNeill, in the Pennsylvania House of Representatives; seated January 2, 2018

== Recent election results ==
=== 2010 ===
PA House election, 2010: Pennsylvania House, District 133
Party	Candidate	Votes	%
Democratic	Joseph F. Brennan	6,585	59.98
Republican	David Molony	4,393	40.02
Total votes		10,978	100.00
Democratic hold			

=== 2012 ===
PA House election, 2012: Pennsylvania House, District 133
Party	Candidate	Votes	%
Democratic	Daniel T. McNeill	10,381	61.26
Republican	David Molony	6,564	38.74
Total votes		16,945	100.00
Democratic hold			

=== 2014 ===
PA House election, 2014: Pennsylvania House, District 133
Party	Candidate	Votes	%
Democratic	Daniel T. McNeill (incumbent)	7,568	55.09
Republican	David Molony	6,170	44.91
Total votes		13,738	100.00
Democratic hold			

=== 2016 ===
PA House election, 2016: Pennsylvania House, District 133
Party	Candidate	Votes	%
Democratic	Daniel T. McNeill (incumbent)	15,102	56.31
Republican	David Molony	10,648	39.70
Total votes		25,750	100.00
Democratic hold			

=== 2017 special election ===
Pennsylvania House of Representatives, District 133 special election, 2017
Party	Candidate	Votes	%
Democratic	Jeanne McNeill	2,302	67.43
Republican	David Molony	992	29.06
Libertarian	Samantha Dorney	120	3.51
Total votes		3,414	100.00
Democratic hold			

=== 2018 ===
PA House election, 2018: Pennsylvania House, District 133
Party	Candidate	Votes	%
Democratic	Jeanne McNeill (incumbent)	Unopposed	
Total votes		15,366	100.00
Democratic hold			

=== 2020 ===
Pennsylvania House of Representatives election, 2020: Pennsylvania House, District 133
Party	Candidate	Votes	%
Democratic	Jeanne McNeill (incumbent)	18,844	60.65
Republican	David Molony	12,227	39.35
Total votes		31,071	100.00
Democratic hold			

=== 2022 ===
Pennsylvania House of Representatives election, 2022: Pennsylvania House, District 133
Party	Candidate	Votes	%
Democratic	Jeanne McNeill (incumbent)	Unopposed	
Total votes		17,431	100.00
Democratic hold			
