= Eric Rosenbach =

Pentagon Chief of Staff

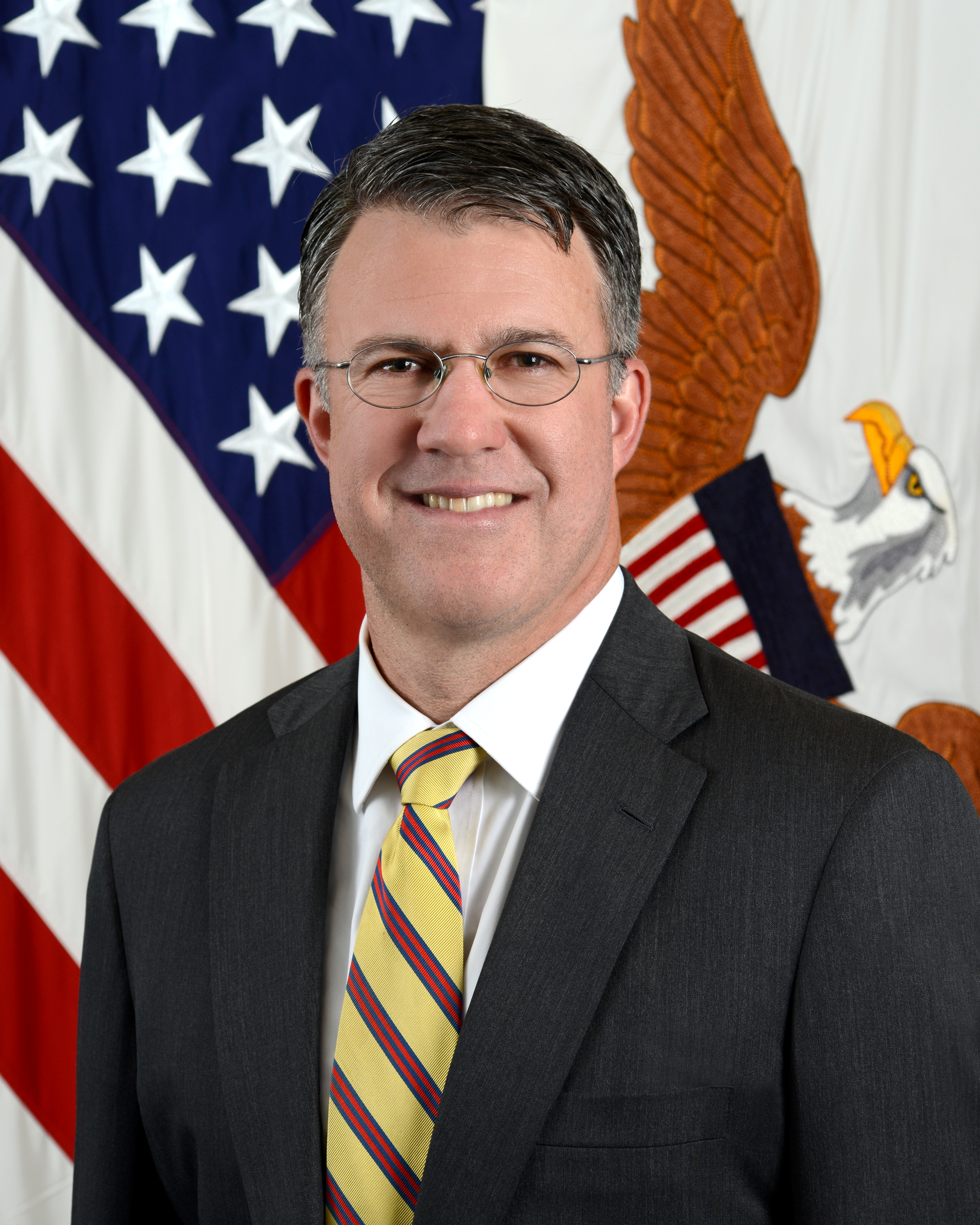

Assistant Secretary of Defense for Homeland Defense and Global Security
- In office September 23, 2014 – July 6, 2015
- President: Barack Obama
- Preceded by: Paul N. Stockton
- Succeeded by: Kenneth Rapuano

Personal details
- Born: Colorado Springs, Colorado
- Education: Davidson College (BA); Harvard University (MPP); Georgetown University (JD)

Military service
- Allegiance: United States
- Branch/service: United States Army
- Years of service: 1995–2000
- Rank: Captain

Eric Brien Rosenbach is an American public servant and professor who served as Pentagon Chief of Staff from July 2015 to January 2017 and as Assistant Secretary of Defense for Homeland Defense and Global Security from September 2014 to September 2015. As Chief of Staff, Rosenbach assisted Secretary Ash Carter on the Department of Defense's major challenges of the time, which included increased Russian aggression, the Syrian Civil War, and North Korean missile tests.

Rosenbach's background is in cybersecurity, both public and private sector. He was the first-ever DoD ‘cyber tzar’ known as the Principal Cyber Advisor to the Secretary of Defense. From September 2011 to August 2014, he served as the Deputy Assistant Secretary of Defense for Cyber, in which role he oversaw and led the DoD's cybersecurity strategy. Rosenbach continued to oversee cybersecurity as Chief of Staff. From 2000 to 2002 he advised Tiscali, the then-largest Internet service provider in Europe, on cybersecurity as their Chief Security Officer, and prior to that, he was an Army intelligence communications officer.

Returning to Harvard Kennedy School to teach in 2007, Rosenbach was the executive director of the Belfer Center for Science and International Affairs for three years before going to the DoD. He would again return to Harvard in May 2017 to become co-director of the Belfer Center with Secretary Ash Carter.

In 2022, he was appointed to the Secretary of State’s International Security Advisory Board (ISAB).

== Early life ==
Eric Rosenbach was born at the US Air Force Academy in Colorado. His father, Dr. William E. Rosenbach, a thirty-year Air Force Veteran, served in the U.S. Air Force flying a Lockheed C-130 Hercules in the Vietnam War. A professor at the academy, Dr. Rosenbach was an influential force in Eric Rosenbach's decision to join the military through the ROTC program.

== Education ==
Rosenbach graduated from Gettysburg Area High School in 1991 and played football and basketball while a student there.

On a ROTC scholarship at Davidson, Rosenbach was elected student body president, played quarterback for the Davidson football team, and was a ROTC battalion commander. Rosenbach got involved in Davidson's Dean Rusk International Studies Program and found public service appealing. A Davidson article quotes him as saying, “Public service motivated me. It’s a rewarding feeling to know you’re making a little bit of difference in the world. I figured that I’d be either a history or government teacher, or work in the foreign service.” The Dean Rusk program gave Rosenbach a grant to go to Vietnam - the country where his father had flown for the US Air Force and had almost been shot down. The trip inspired him to think deeply about military use of force and US foreign policy.

Upon graduation from Davidson, Rosenbach became a Fulbright Scholar and studied privatization in post-communist Bulgaria for a year. He then entered the US Army as an intelligence officer in the Army (see early career).

Rosenbach attended Harvard Kennedy School from 2002 to 2004 and received a Masters in Public Policy. He was HKS professors Richard A Clarke and Graham Allison's Graduate Assistant; they both have been great mentors to him. Upon graduating he enrolled into the Georgetown University Law Center and obtained a Juris Doctor in 2007.

Rosenbach learned German at the Volkshochschule Rosenheim in Germany.

== Career ==
Rosenbach served as the commander of a communications intelligence unit in the US Army for four years, 1996 to 2000. The unit, which worked closely with the National Security Agency, provided strategic information to support US operations in Bosnia and Kosovo. The Central Intelligence Agency named it the top intelligence organization in the U.S. military for two consecutive years.

In 2000 Rosenbach left the Army with the rank of captain. He became the chief security officer for Tiscali, an internet telecommunication company that was then the largest Internet service provider in Europe. For two years he was responsible for their cybersecurity. He recollects, “It was such a different environment from the army. I had a fancy company car and flew all over Europe. But then 9/11 happened, and that really jarred me. I realized what I was doing didn’t feel rewarding, and went back to school intent on doing something in the public sector.”

After graduating from HKS in 2004, Rosenbach worked on the core staff of John Kerry's 2004 Presidential Campaign for Kerry's security advisors Rand Beers and Susan Rice.

Rosenbach served as a professional staff member for the Senate Select Committee on Intelligence, US Senate. In that role he led the investigation into whether there were ties between Al-Qaeda and Saddam Hussein in the 9/11 attacks. He also had oversight of the US’ counterterrorism profile and the individual agencies’ counterterrorism operations (including the CIA and NSA).

Concurrently (2005–2007), Rosenbach advised Senator Chuck Hagel as his National Security Advisor.

=== The Department of Defense ===
Rosenbach became the second ever Deputy Assistant Secretary of Defense for Cyber in September 2011. In that position he was responsible for creating and implementing DoD's strategy for US operations in cyberspace. He co-authored Presidential Policy Directive 20, which established principles and processes for US cyber operations and was signed by President Barack Obama in 2012. He also helped design and establish the mission force of the US Cyber Command (USCYBERCOM).

In September 2014, Rosenbach was confirmed by the US Senate as Assistant Secretary of Defense for Homeland Defense and Global Security. In that role he led the DoD's efforts to deter Chinese theft of American intellectual property and to counter Iranian and North Korean cyber attacks against US critical infrastructure. He also dealt with the proliferation of weapons of mass destruction, space operations, and antiterrorism. He helped lead the implementation of the Global Health Security Agenda with a stress on multi-sector approaches to combating global health threats. Rosenbach led the DoD's domestic response to the Ebola outbreak in 2014 and established new medical safety policies.

Rosenbach became Pentagon Chief of Staff in July 2015. As Chief of Staff, Rosenbach was a senior leader of the Department of Defense, an organization with a yearly budget of $550 billion, 2.8 million personnel, and high-stakes operations across the globe.

Rosenbach and Carter's many objectives were defeating ISIL, building effective cyber strategy, and opening all combat positions to female service members. Other major priorities included counterterrorism operations, and strategies for the Asia-Pacific, Europe, and Middle East regions.

One of Rosenbach's major projects was purported innovation improvement at the DoD. Rosenbach's efforts included the Defense Innovation Unit Experimental (DIUx), the Defence Digital Service (a project Rosenbach conceived of and helped lead), the Silicon Valley–based Defense Innovation Unit, and the Defense Innovation Board.

In October 2022, Rosenbach was appointed to the U.S. State Department’s Secretary of State’s International Security Advisory Board (ISAB).

=== Belfer Center ===
Rosenbach is a Senior Lecturer in Public Policy at the Harvard Kennedy School, and Director of the Defense, Emerging Technology, and Strategy Program at Harvard’s Belfer Center for Science and International Affairs.

He served as co-director of Harvard Kennedy School's Belfer Center for Science and International Affairs from 2017 until June 2023, alongside former U.S. Secretary of Defense Ash Carter.

At Harvard, Rosenbach teaches graduate courses in policy development, strategy execution, and emerging technology, and he also offers two HarvardX online courses on managing cyber risk and public sector strategy execution.

With former campaign managers Robby Mook and Matt Rhoades, Rosenbach co-founded the Defending Digital Democracy Project at Harvard’s Belfer Center in 2017, a bipartisan initiative aimed at developing strategies and tools to protect democratic elections from cyber and information attacks.

== Personal life ==
Rosenbach is married, and has two children.

== Distinctions ==
- The Meritorious Service Medal and the Knowlton Award. The Medal is awarded for, “noncombat meritorious achievement or service that is incontestably exceptional and of magnitude that clearly places the individual above his peers”. The Award, “recognizes individuals who have contributed significantly to the promotion of Army Military Intelligence in ways that stand out in the eyes of the recipients, their superiors, subordinates, and peers[,]... demonstrate the highest standards of integrity and moral character, [and] display an outstanding degree of professional competence".
- The Director of the Central Intelligence Agency named his intelligence unit the top intelligence organization in the U.S. military for two consecutive years.
- In February 2015, then Secretary of Defense Chuck Hagel awarded Rosenbach with The Secretary of Defense Medal for Outstanding Public Service. “Mr. Rosenbach’s professional skill, leadership, and tireless initiative resulted in major contributions to the Department's and the Nation’s cyber policy.
- November 2016 Secretary Carter awarded Rosenbach with The Department of Defense Medal for Distinguished Public Service. “Through his expertise in national security and foreign affairs, he provided invaluable advice and assistance.”

== Works written ==
- Confronting Cyber Risk: An Embedded Endurance Strategy for Cybersecurity - defines a new strategy for leadership to improve cybersecurity and mitigate cyber risk using case studies. Co-authored with Gregory Falco, a cybersecurity and space systems expert.
- Find, Fix, Finish: Inside the Counterterrorism Campaigns that Killed Bin Laden and Devastated Al Qaeda - details the US transformation from having no cohesive counterterrorism policy pre-9/11 to the all out war waged against the perpetrators over the following decade. Co-authored with Aki Peritz, a security expert.
- Military Leadership and Pursuit of Excellence - examines the fundamentals of military leadership. Written by Robert L. Taylor; the sixth edition of the book includes fresh perspectives from Rosenbach who served on the book's editorial team.
