= Lehigh Valley Silk Mills =

- U.S. National Register of Historic Places
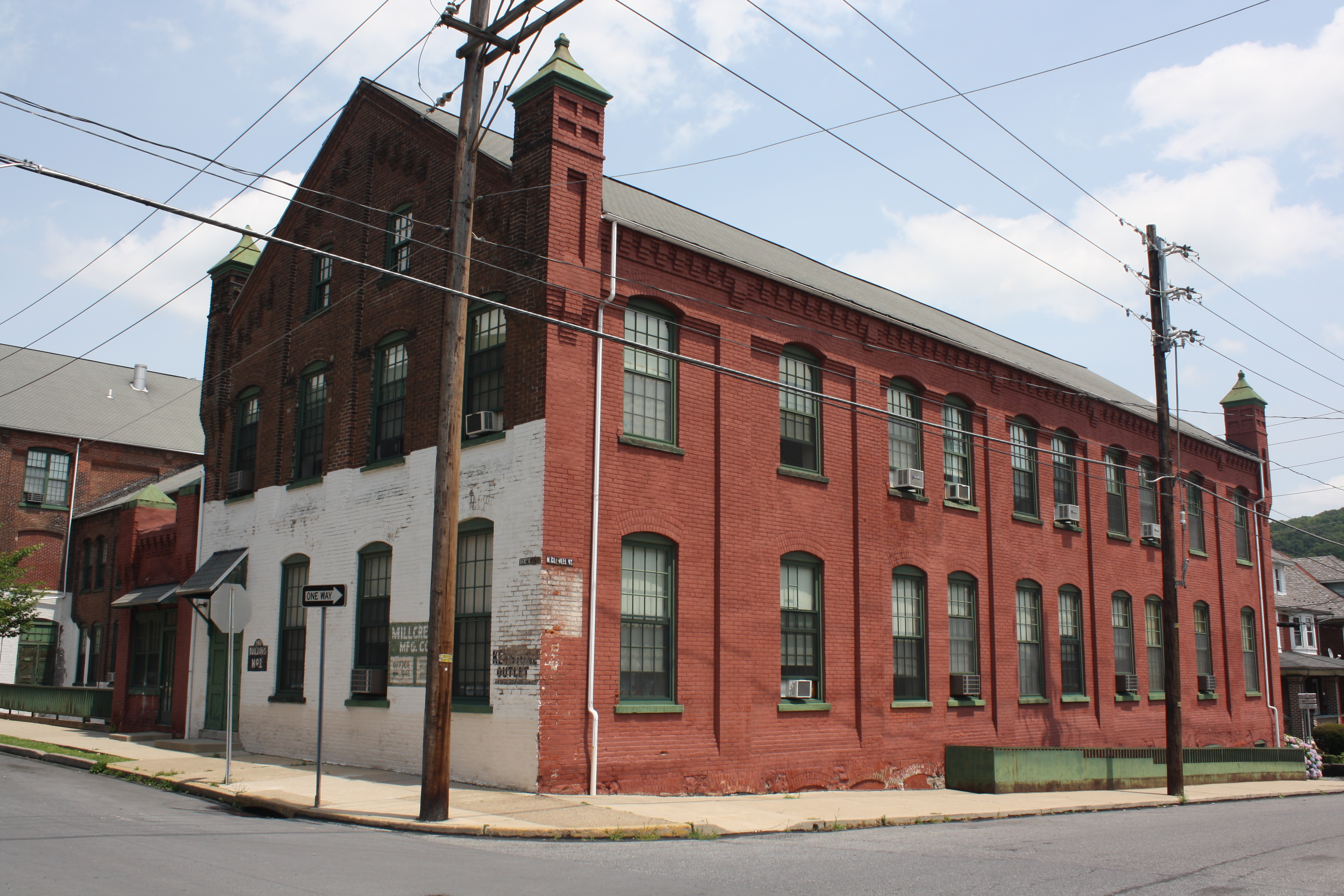
- Lipps & Sutton Silk Mill in Fountain Hill, Pennsylvania, June 2013

- Location within Pennsylvania Location within the United States
- Location: Jct. of Seneca and Clewell Sts., Fountain Hill, Pennsylvania
- Coordinates: 40°36′16″N 75°23′37″W
- Area: 1.7 acres (0.69 ha)
- Built: 1886–1904
- Architect: A.W. Leh, J. Stewart Allam
- Architectural style: Vernacular
- NRHP reference No.: 93000356
- Added to NRHP: April 29, 1993

The Lehigh Valley Silk Mills were a collection of mills located in the Lehigh Valley region of eastern Pennsylvania in the 19th and 20th centuries.

The industry began in 1881 and thrived throughout the Second Industrial Revolution. The Lehigh Valley Silk Mills also refers to a specific company that owned the Lipps & Sutton Silk Mill and Warren Mill. The first silk mill in the Lehigh Valley opened in 1881 and was followed by the opening of many others. By 1900, there were twenty-three silk establishments in the Lehigh Valley, making Pennsylvania the second largest producer of silk in the world.

The silk industry in Pennsylvania peaked in the late 1920s due to cheap labor, mainly from immigrant workers' children and wives. However, after the Great Depression, increasing labor unrest and competition from other textile industries began to affect the silk industry locally and nationally. By 1953, Allentown had become the number one silk city in the world, but even then, the number of looms had decreased. At the time, only six mills continued to work with silk exclusively. Other mills either shut down due to bankruptcy or shifted to the production of synthetic fibers.

== History ==
As the United States entered the Gilded Age, the demand for luxurious silk clothing spiked. During the late 1800s silk was becoming popular with the growing middle class who wished to emulate the wealthy tycoons of the day. The growing industrialized American silk industry answered this demand. After the Civil War, an American silk industry became established in Paterson, New Jersey. There, the silk manufacturers relied on skilled workers, who demand good wages and working conditions. By 1880, new machines were changing the way silk was spun, knitted, and woven. As a result silk mill owners were looking to build new mills in areas with a large supply of low-cost labor. The collapse of the national railroad building boom in 1873 devastated the iron industry. In the wake of closing iron mills, Lehigh Valley business leaders saw an opportunity in the business of silk producers. They advertised the region's good railroads, secure supply of coal power, and cheap non-unionized labor.

Interest in silk in the Lehigh Valley can be seen as early as 1762, but the industry did not become established on a large scale until The Adelaide Silk Mill, the first silk mill in the Lehigh Valley, opened in November 1881. This was soon followed by the R.H. Simon Silk Mill in 1883. By 1900, there were twenty-three silk establishments in the Lehigh Valley, making it and Pennsylvania the world's second-largest producer of silk, second only to New Jersey. As many as 224 mills produced silk in the Lehigh Valley between 1881 and 1989. The silk industry peaked in the late 1920s. The industry was Allentown's largest employer during this time. In 1928, the peak production year, 106 mills operated simultaneously in the Lehigh Valley.

The silk industry was drawn to the Lehigh Valley for its access to water, power and labor. The spinning machines in the mills required constant tending, and provided jobs that suited the women and children of that era. Because of this they had a tendency to be located near mines and other heavy industries that would attract men to work, who would bring their wives and children to possibly seek employment.

In an attempt to address issues with youth unemployment, in 1883 Easton formed its first "industrial association". After establishing the association, the associates needed to attract business to Easton. They successfully developed a partnership with a New Jersey silk manufacturing company. Robert and Herman Simon expanded their enterprise from Union Hill, New Jersey west to Easton, Pennsylvania. It was at this time that the R&H Simon Company constructed buildings along 13th Street, Easton. At the start, the company had a workforce of 250 people. The facility expanded in 1899 by increasing its workforce to 1,060. The mill eventually employed 1,200 workers and included 1,500 pieces of machinery. The R&H Simon Silk Company was the largest producer of black silk ribbon in the world and at one point in time employed up to 2,000 workers at its Easton plant.

The deaths of Robert Simon and Herman Simon in 1901 marshalled in a transformative period for the company. The Easton Industrial Corporation managed the company from roughly 1933 – 1985, periodically loaning the property. In 1991, Pfizer Pigments Inc. transferred the property to James and Helen Garofalo and Helen Beth Garofalo-Vilcek who subsequently transferred the property to the City of Easton in 2006.

One of the most important men of the American Silk industry, Desiderius George Dery, also made his home in the valley. By 1920 he was the largest single producer of silk in the world, and 8 of his 15 mills were located in the Lehigh Valley.

The demise of the silk industry in the Lehigh Valley can be traced to the Great Depression, Southern competition and new synthetics. After the Great Depression, increasing labor unrest affected the industry locally and nationally. After peaking in the 1920s, silk, like the rest of the luxury goods industry, suffered heavily in the Great Depression. The Lehigh Valley lost at least fifty-eight silk mills from 1929 to 1939. Many new mills were opening in the South due to the availability of cheaper labor. During World War II the silk supply, which predominantly came from Japan, was cut off. After the war, new synthetic fibers developed during the war, such as nylon, replaced silk in many garments. Some mills survived by shifting to Rayon or other materials. By 1953, Allentown, which had become the number one silk city, saw a decrease in the number of looms by 80 percent, with only six mills working exclusively with silk. The next few decades saw increasing international competition from low-wage countries. The Catoir Silk Co., established in 1918, was the last silk mill in Allentown and closed in 1989. The industry was killed off through the globalization of the 1960s through 1980s, that brought cheaper goods produced in other countries. Low wage labor, which had originally brought the silk industry to the Lehigh Valley, was what led to its departure from the region.

== Child labor and female employment ==
Throughout the late 1800s, child labor was common throughout Pennsylvania silk mills as many families depended on additional income for subsistence. Compared to adult males whose yearly wages hovered around $485.11 and adult females whose had remained at $345.44, minors of either sex only earned roughly $143.64 yearly. This large wage gap made child labor attractive to mill owners, and quickly drew manufacturers to the Lehigh Valley area. Between 1880 and 1925, the value of silk products manufactured in Pennsylvania increased tenfold. At this time, working children were the cheapest form of labor used to maximize profits. In 1876, roughly 30 silk manufacturers opened plants in Pennsylvania largely due to the availability of child labor and the lack of concern for children in the wage labor force. By 1907, children comprised roughly 30% of the labor force throughout the Pennsylvania silk mills, many under the legal working age of 12.

Although child labor persisted throughout the early 1900s, a progressive reform to keep children in school and out of the silk mills was quietly brewing. Throughout the Progressive Era, journalists, settlement house workers and a philanthropic organization called the National Child Labor Committee (NCLC) studied, documented, and publicized the dangers of the work place for growing children. The committee pushed for legislation limiting hours of work and types of employment for young people and helped set a minimum legal working age. Between 1900 and 1920, the changes the reformers pushed for were slowly implemented but suffered many setbacks. Lack of enforcement by state factory inspectors made it difficult to ensure that silk mill manufacturers were abiding by the terms of the progressive reform and many laboring families still depended on their children's wages. Despite this, children's wages began to grow and soon after, children between the ages of 12 and 15 were slowly phased out of the silk mill labor force altogether. This progressive reform in setting a minimum legal working age led to the shift from children in the workforce to female employment.

In 1925, around the Lehigh Valley area, a study of immigrant women conducted by the United States Department of Labor and the United States Women's Bureau illustrated that there was a large shift in the number of wives and mothers that occupied positions in the silk mill industry. In the early 1900s the silk mills employed a large population of girls under the age of 18 who worked to financially support their families during this time of economic distress. Areas within the Lehigh Valley, such as Allentown and South Bethlehem, had two to threefold more girls under the age of 18 working compared to women over the age of 25. As the 1900s began to take shape, starting around the 1920s, the age of women changed drastically as new progressive laws pushed young females out of the industry. New legislation during this time led to an increase in employment of married women in labor industries.

The shift from child labor to the labor of adult, married women was one that all progressive pioneers strived for, yet may have seemed pessimistic during the late 19th century to early 20th century. As families began to require a higher level of financial assistance, this led to a need for at least more than one source of income. Wages at silk mills were often much lower than that needed to be able to efficiently support a family, although the wage was helpful as it was better than no income at all. Even with respect to the new legislation passed, parents still kept their children out of the workforce well over the legal age of fourteen. By the late 1920s it was widely acceptable to see women work outside of the house in order to provide additional income for families. In addition, young children were able to maintain more years of schooling, ultimately increasing their human capital for future endeavors.

== Silk Mill redevelopment ==
=== R&H Simon Silk Mill ===
The R&H Simon Silk Mill was originally built in 1883 along Bushkill Creek on North 13th street in Easton, Pennsylvania. The mill was bought in 2006 by the Easton Redevelopment Authority, and developers Mark Mulligan and William Vogt of VM Development Group joined the $50 million project. Construction of the project began in 2010. In addition, another building at 544 N. 13th Street that is part of the Simon Silk Mill, will be developed into four additional apartments by B2 Ventures of Bethlehem, which is owned by developer Borko Milosev. The plans for the Mill include 150 residential units and at least 150,000 square feet of commercial space. The plan entails two thirds of the apartments to be one-bedroom spaces and the remaining third to be two-bedroom spaces. The new buildings will contain some of the original brick walls, refurbished wood floors and restored windows. In addition, a piece of industrial machinery will be removed from inside one of the mills and left in a prominent outdoor location. The refurbished area and apartments are intended to be ready for tenants to move in by spring of 2016. The project's success is crucial to the city's economic future and is intended to be a space for resident artists to form a community. Throughout the project's redevelopment stages, environmental remediation was necessary. In the basement of one of the main mill buildings, workers found contaminated soil. Due to the building's industrial history as a silk mill, soil and groundwater was contaminated with metals and organic compounds. Remediation of the area was approved by state environmental officials and was successfully completed. The R&H Simon Silk Mill was added to the National Register of Historic Places in December 2014.

=== Dery Silk Mill ===
Located in Catasauqua, the Dery Silk Mill was built in 1897 by Desiderius George Deri. The building is an L-Shaped building with three stories on Race and Front streets and once employed 400 workers. The renovations of the mill began in 1984 with the purpose of improving the walls by removing poison ivy, steam-cleaning and repointing. In addition, the windows were removed, improved, and reinstalled. The now rental complex has 35 units with restored maple flooring and spaces divided by dry wall and duplexes created with beams and lofts.

=== Adelaide Silk Mill ===
Opening in November 1881, the Adelaide Silk Mill was built by businessmen from Allentown for the Phoenix Manufacturing Co., a silk maker from Paterson, New Jersey looking to relocate. The mill is a U-shaped building at 333 W. Court St. off of Jordan Creek in the Lehigh Canal. The mill was redeveloped after operations ended in 1964. Currently, the mill is vacant but it has been used as an antique market, a fitness facility, and many other businesses. There were plans in 2013 to convert the two buildings into 150 apartments and commercial space under the declaration of a Keystone Opportunity Zone, which would exempt the property from real estate taxes for the first ten years. The Allentown School Board and Lehigh County Commissioners voted against this.

=== Bethlehem Silk Mill ===
The Bethlehem Silk Mill is located on West Goepp Street in Bethlehem. In 2006, the complex was in the process of being developed by Ashley Development and Philadelphia-based Campus Apartments Inc. into student apartments for Moravian College. The $15 million redevelopment project was four months from completion when a fire broke out. The fire marked the end of Moravian College's investment in the redevelopment project. The five building complex was then re-bought in 2008 by Abraham Atiyeh. Abraham Atiyeh continued with the plans to turn the complex into apartments. As of October 2012, Atiyeh had sold a portion of the property to his former business partner, Ramzi Haddad. This portion of the property was pre-approved for the building of 90 more apartments. As of 2012, Atiyeh also had an ongoing discussion to sell the existing 61 apartments to a New York Real Estate Company. The Bethlehem Silk Mill was added to the National Register of Historic Places in February 2005.

=== Lipps & Sutton Silk Mills ===
The Lipps & Sutton Silk Mill is located in Fountain Hill, Pennsylvania. The mill was completely redeveloped in the early 1990s into multiple use spaces some of which include: apartments, municipal offices and police headquarters. The buildings were renovated using federal historic preservation tax credit. In addition, in 1993, the mill was placed on the National Register of Historic Places because it was one of the first mills in the area during the Industrial Revolution. Currently, it is the location of the administrative offices for the Fountain Hill Borough.

== In music ==
The folk/country song Silken Dreams performed by Anne Hills and Michael Smith is a worker's lament about the gradual closure of the silk mills in Allentown. The lyrics are available online as well

== Gallery ==
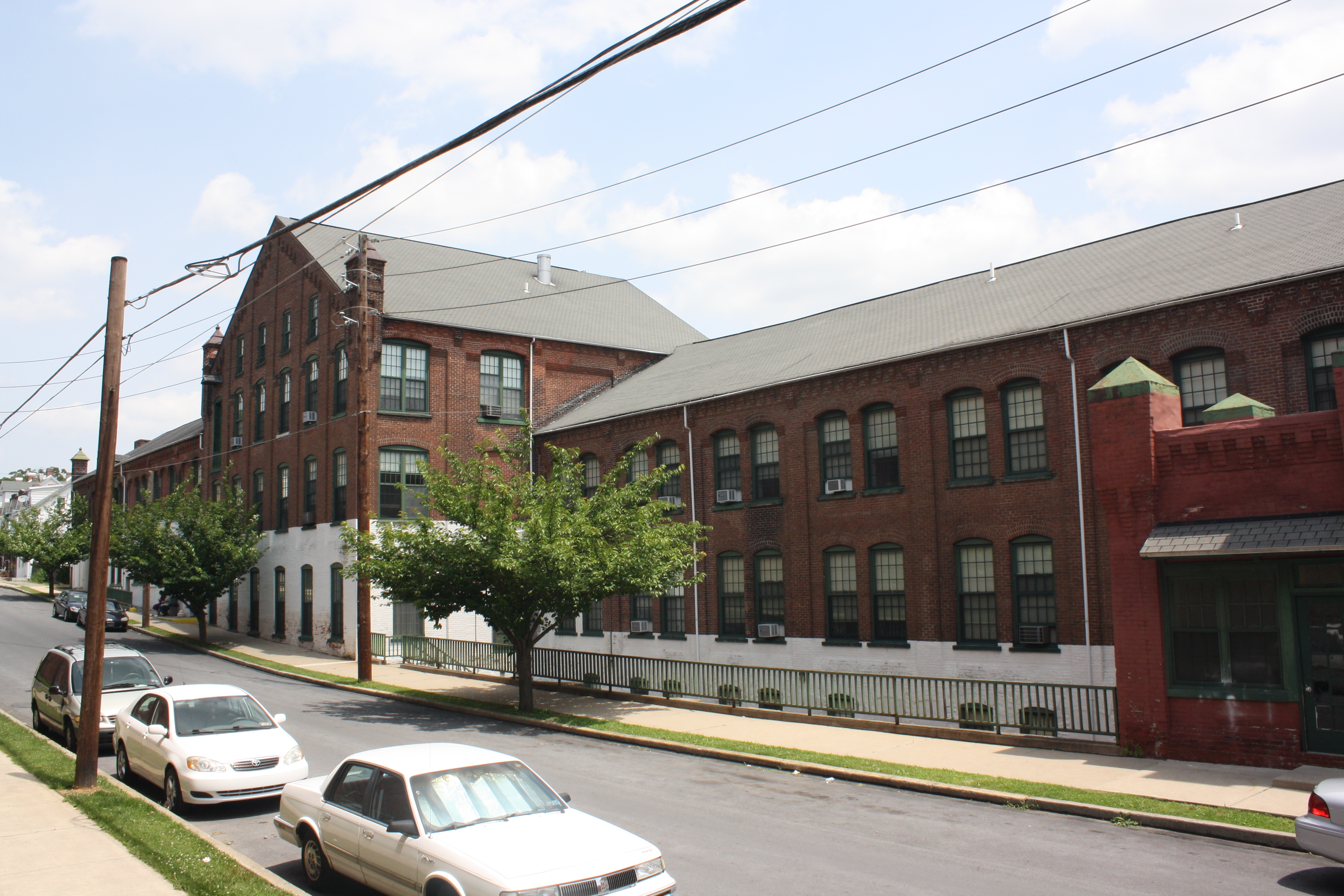
Lipps & Sutton Silk Mill, central part.

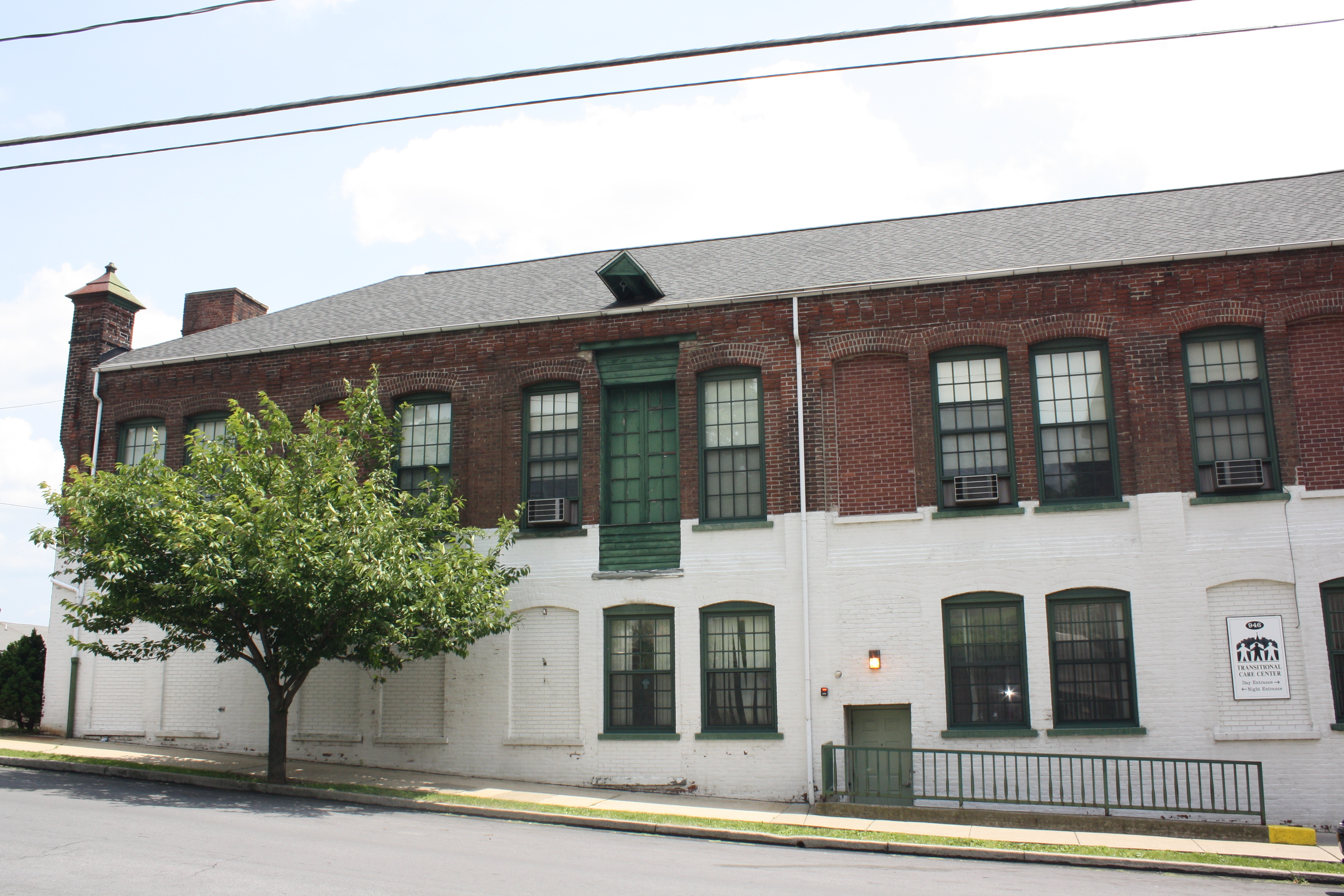
Lipps & Sutton Silk Mill, north wing.

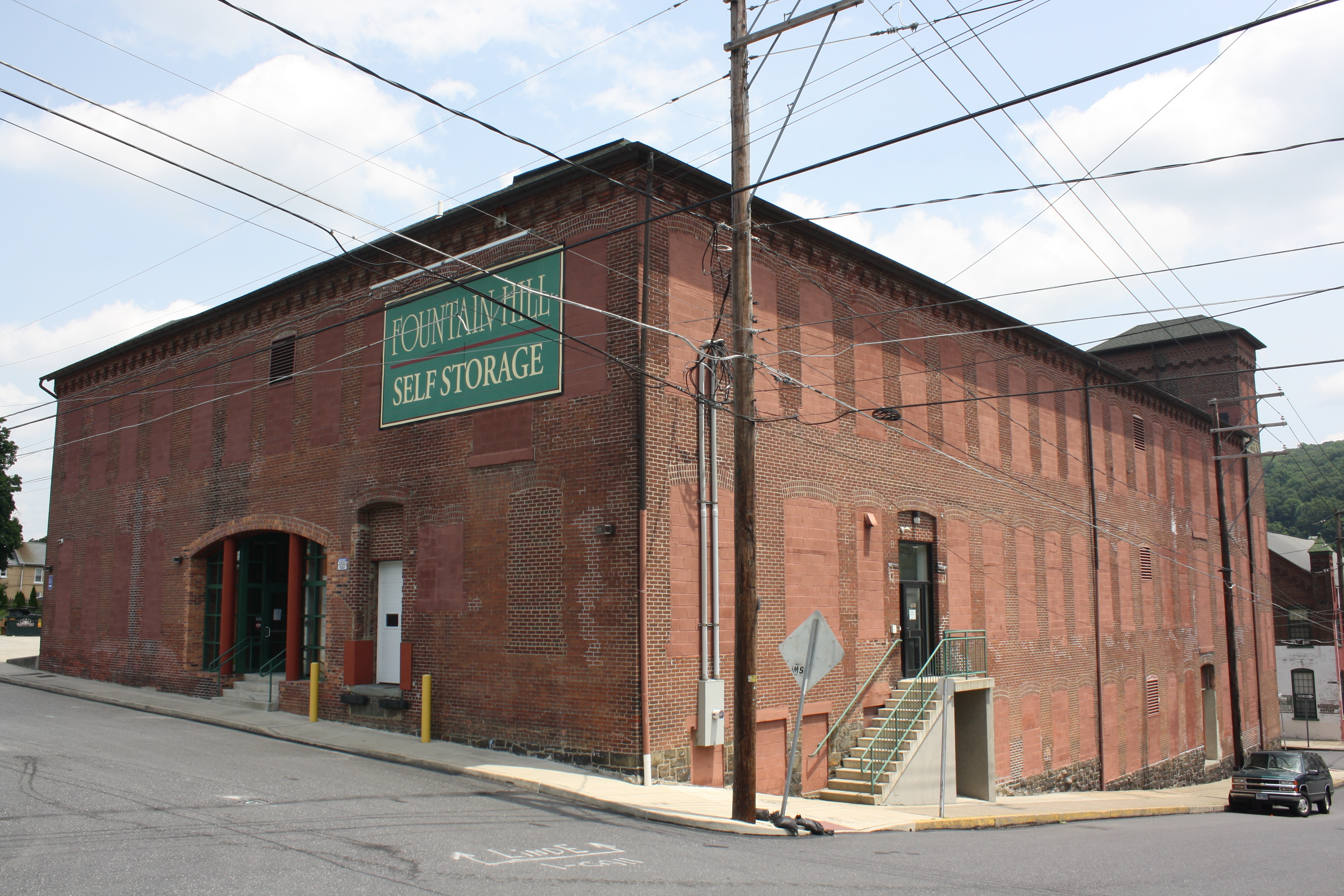
Warren Mill, south-west corner.

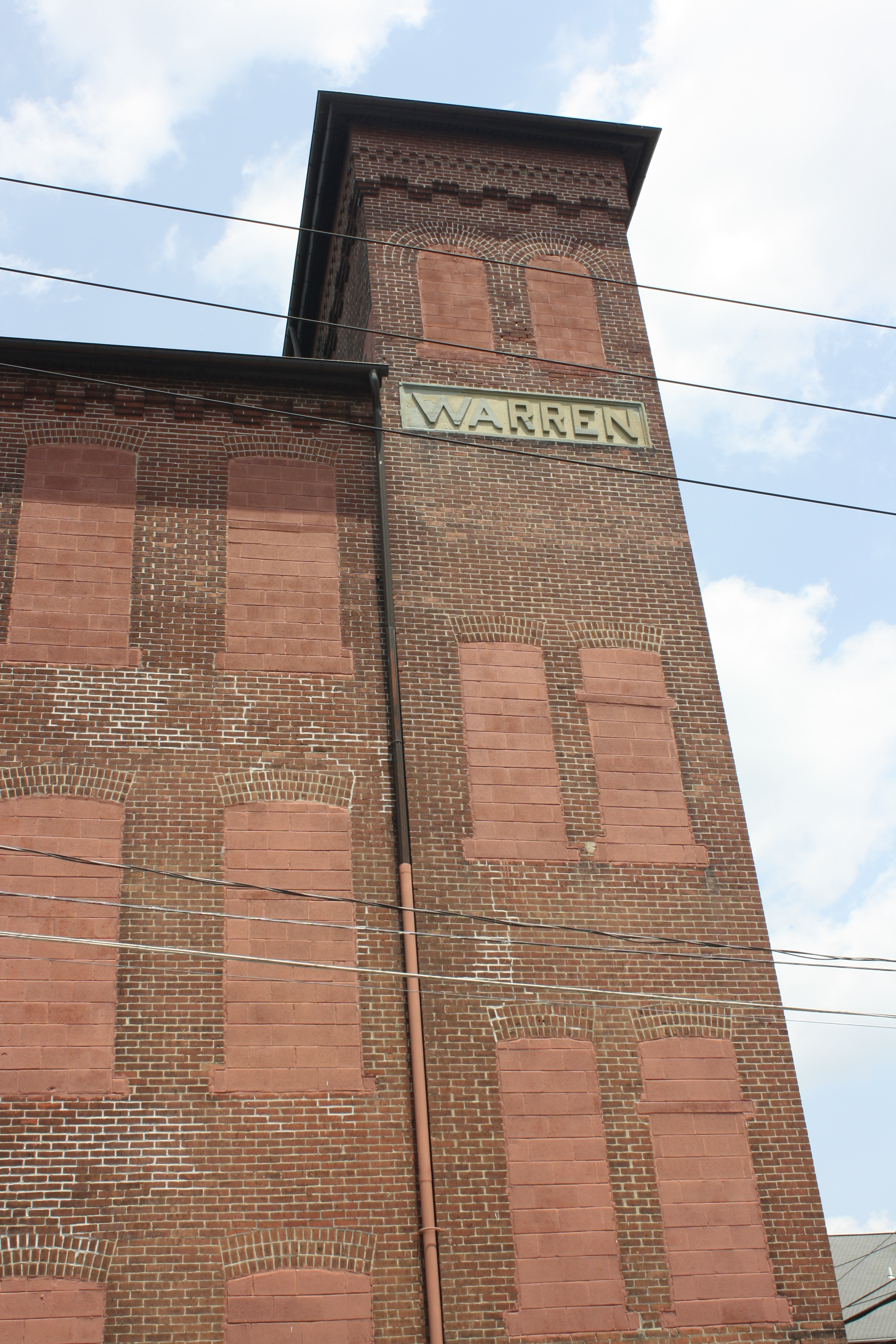
Warren Mill, tower.

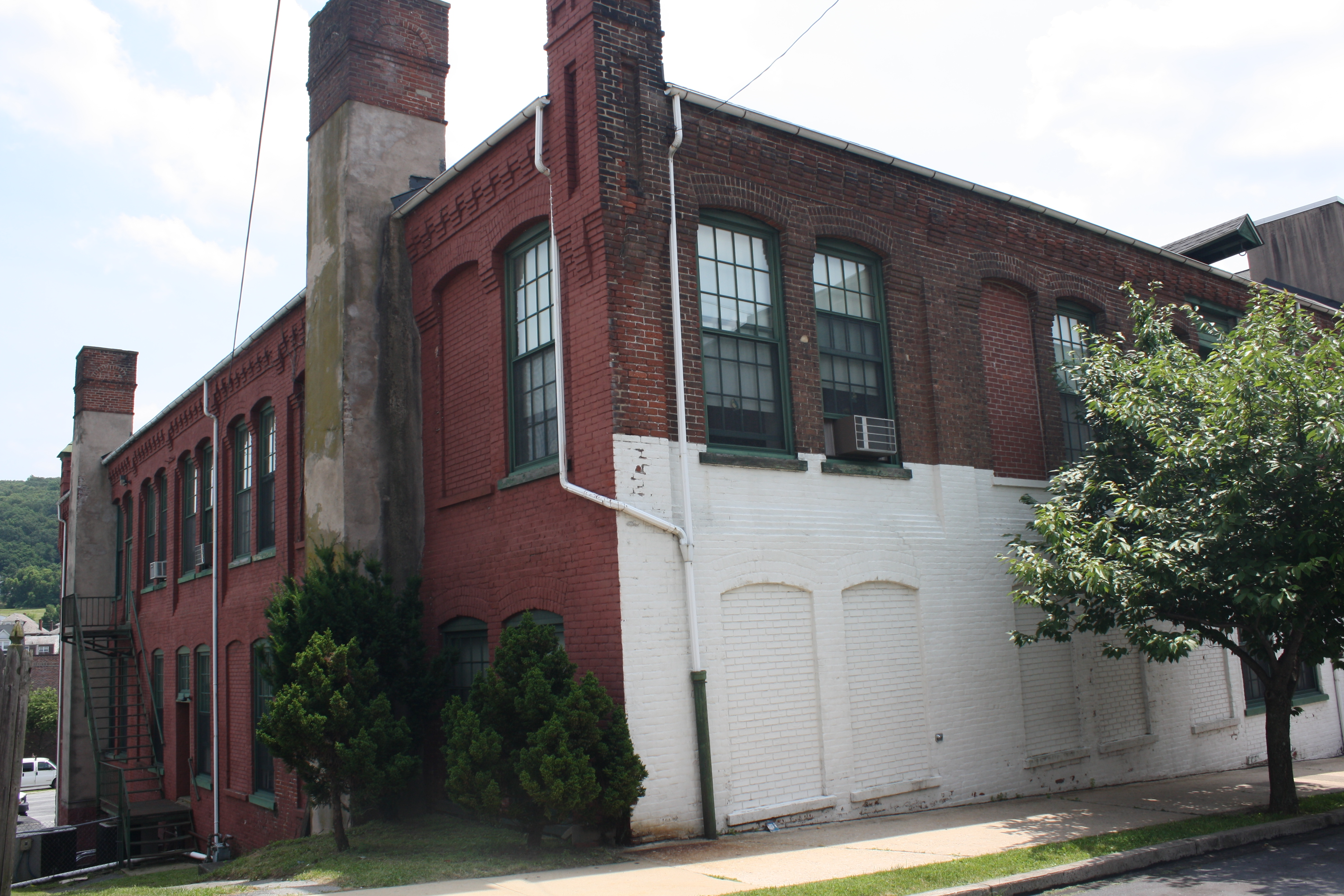
Warren Mill, back yard.
