= Fountain Hill, Pennsylvania =

Borough in Pennsylvania, US

Borough of Fountain Hill
- Borough
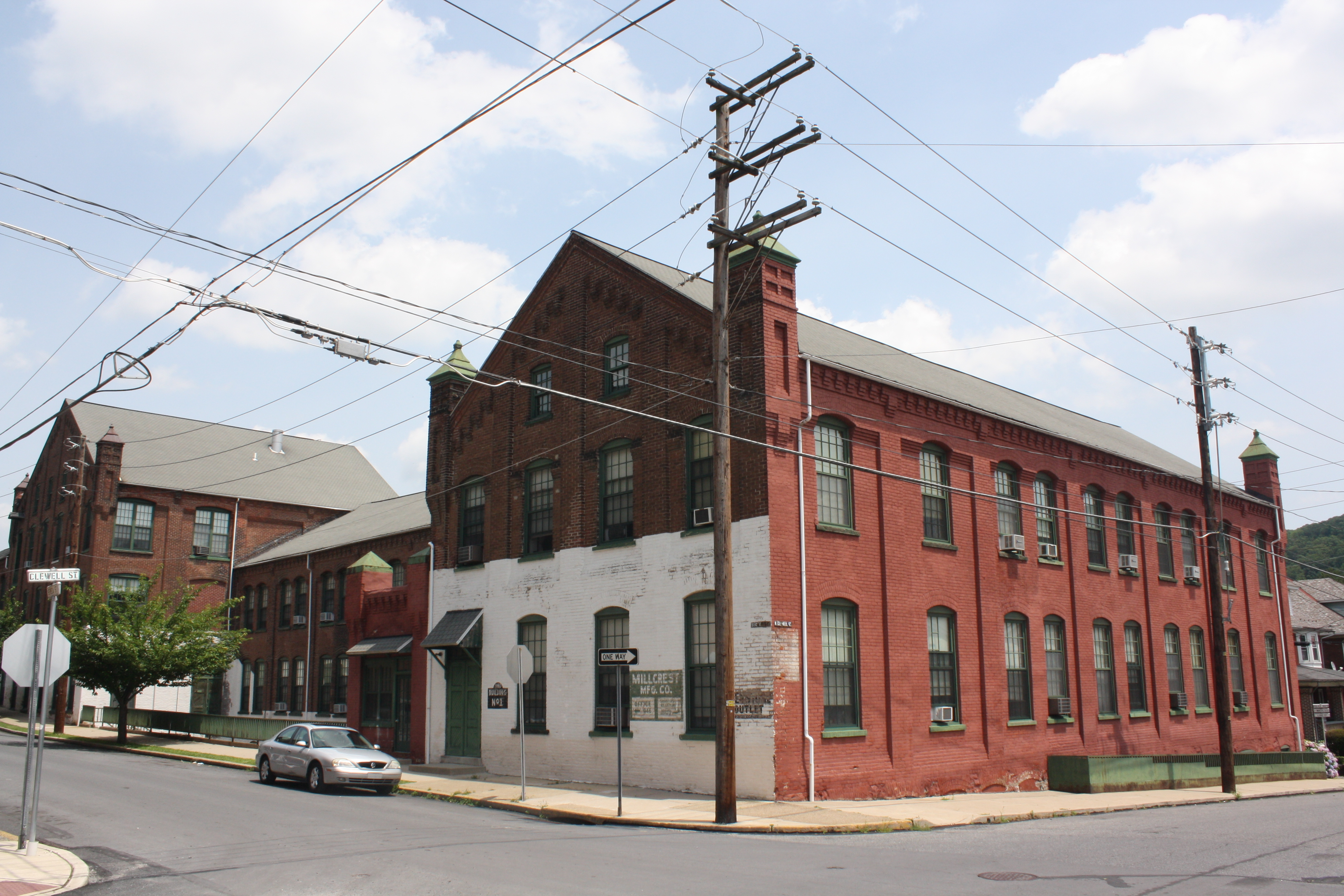
- Lehigh Valley Silk Mills in Fountain Hill in June 2013

- Seal
- Motto: Equality under the law
- Location of Fountain Hill in Lehigh County, Pennsylvania (left) and of Lehigh County in Pennsylvania (right)

- Location of Fountain Hill in Pennsylvania Fountain Hill (the United States)
- Coordinates: 40°36′03″N 75°23′47″W
- Country: United States
- State: Pennsylvania
- County: Lehigh
- Settled: 1739
- Plotted: 1866
- Incorporated: November 13, 1893
- Named for: Fontainebleau Estate

Government
  - Mayor: Michael Johnson
  - Council President: Stewart McCandless

Area
  - Borough: 0.75 sq mi (1.95 km^{2})
  - Land: 0.73 sq mi (1.90 km^{2})
  - Water: 0.019 sq mi (0.05 km^{2})
- Elevation: 364 ft (111 m)

Population (2020)
  - Borough: 4,832
  - Density: 6,570.8/sq mi (2,536.99/km^{2})
  - Metro: 865,310 (US: 68th)
- Time zone: UTC-5 (EST)
  - Summer (DST): UTC-4 (EDT)
- ZIP Code: 18015
- Area codes: 610 and 484
- FIPS code: 42-27008
- Primary airport: Lehigh Valley International Airport
- Major hospital: Lehigh Valley Hospital–Cedar Crest
- School district: Bethlehem Area
- Website: www.fountainhill.org

Fountain Hill is a borough in Lehigh County, Pennsylvania, United States. The population of Fountain Hill was 4,832 at the 2020 census, an increase over the figure of 4,597 tabulated in 2010. It is part of the Lehigh Valley metropolitan area, which had a population of 861,899 and was the 68th-most populous metropolitan area in the U.S. as of the 2020 census.

== History ==
The region which would become Fountain Hill was home to Lenape Indians prior to its acquisition by William Penn for his sons, Thomas, John and Richard in 1681. The Penns hired a pioneer, Nicholas Doll, to settle the land, building the first structure there in 1739. The deed for the land was passed to several farming families before being sold to the Moravians in newly-established Bethlehem in 1743. Moravians owned present-day Fountain Hill for 32 years. Over a century after the purchase the area consisted of non-Moravian tenant farmer, the largest of which was a 147-acre farm owned by the Hoffert family. The farm house was built in 1755 by Cornelius Weygandt and remains the oldest standing structure in the borough.

=== 19th century ===
In 1846, the Moravians sold two acres of the property to Dr. Francis Henry Oppelt, who opened a hotel and mineral spa on the site. Oppelt was a staunch believer in balneotherapy and believed the mineral waters could cure diseases and other ailments. Oppelt's facility existed for 25 years from 1846 until 1871.

Oppelt eventually went bankrupt, and the resort was sold in a sheriff sale to Tinsley Jeter, who in turn sold it to Asa Packer, founder of Lehigh University in nearby Bethlehem, in 1876. Packer promptly gifted the land to St. Luke's Hospital who moved their hospital from South Bethlehem to the now vacant resort.

In 1848, the Hoffert farm was sold to real estate developers, who turned it into a massive mansion named the "Fontainebleau estate," which traded ownership several times before 1866 when the estate would also be purchased by Tinsley Jeter who laid a town plot on the property. Jeter purchased most of the farms in the region and the mansions built for Lehigh Valley Railroad executives, many of which are preserved in the Fountain Hill Historic District.

In 1866, Jeter was choosing a name for the property and settled on "Fountain Hill", due to the earlier Fontainebleau estate, which stood on a small hill. In 1886, the growing town became the home to several Silk Mills with the birth of the Industrial Revolution.

With the advent of local industry, the regions population surged, however, there was still no incorporated government, with the region operating as a village within Salisbury Township. After a successful petition to the Lehigh County government, Fountain Hill became an incorporated municipality on November 13, 1893.

=== 20th century ===
In 1905, residents of Fountain Hill rejected a proposal to join the municipality of South Bethlehem (annexed by Bethlehem in 1917) to form an independent city. In 1919, Fountain Hill annexed some portions of neighboring Salisbury Township. A decade later, in 1929, Fountain Hill's most famous resident, Stephen Vincent Benét, began his literary career, publishing John Brown's Body. Through the 1940s, Fountain Hill remained a cultural retreat for Bethlehem residents, hosting many operas, playhouses, and theaters.

In 1949, Fountain Hill annexed another parcel from Salisbury Township, bringing the borough to its present borders.

== Geography ==
Fountain Hill is located at 40°36′6″N 75°23′47″W (40.601698, -75.396357). According to the U.S. Census Bureau, the borough has a total area of 0.7 square miles (1.8 km^{2}), of which 0.7 square miles (1.8 km^{2}) is land and 1.41% is water. Fountain Hill is approximately 450 acres (1.8 km^{2}), predominantly residential in character, with approximately 1,754 dwelling units. It uses the Bethlehem ZIP code of 18015.

== Transportation ==
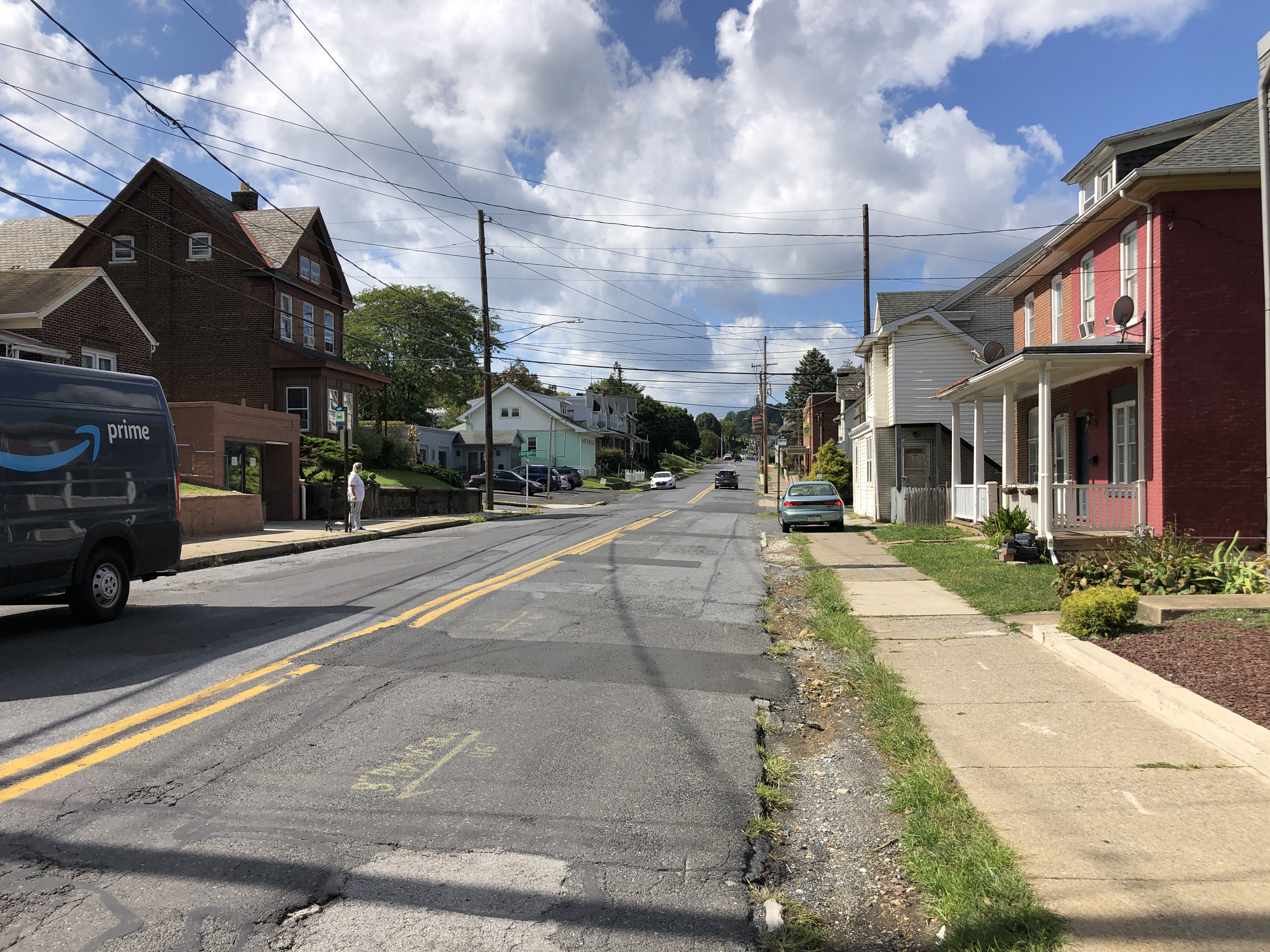
Broadway in Fountain Hill

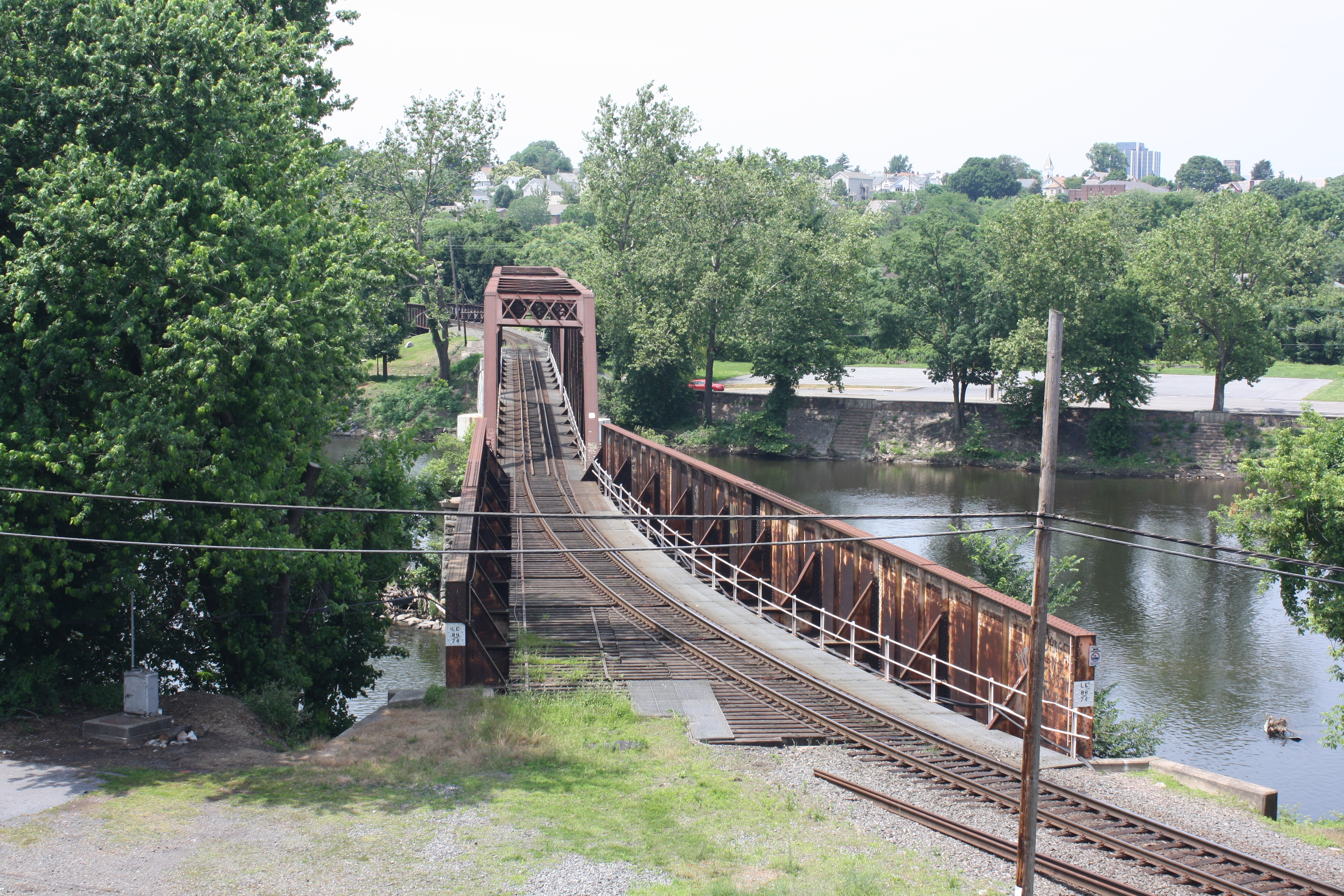
Bridge across the Lehigh River, connecting Fountain Hill with Bethlehem, in June 2013

As of 2010, there were 13.60 miles (21.89 km) of public roads in Fountain Hill, of which 0.88 miles (1.42 km) were maintained by the Pennsylvania Department of Transportation (PennDOT) and 12.72 miles (20.47 km) were maintained by the borough.

No numbered highways pass through Fountain Hill. The main thoroughfare through the borough is Broadway, which follows a northeast–southwest alignment through the middle of town. Pennsylvania Route 378 and Pennsylvania Route 412 are the closest numbered highways, both of which pass just to the east of Fountain Hill.

== Education ==
Fountain Hill is served by the Bethlehem Area School District. Fountain Hill Elementary School for kindergarten through grade five is located in Fountain Hill.

== Demographics ==
=== 2020 census ===
As of the 2020 census, Fountain Hill had a population of 4,832. The median age was 40.1 years. 20.5% of residents were under the age of 18 and 19.7% of residents were 65 years of age or older. For every 100 females there were 86.1 males, and for every 100 females age 18 and over there were 82.3 males age 18 and over.

100.0% of residents lived in urban areas, while 0.0% lived in rural areas.

There were 1,940 households in Fountain Hill, of which 28.5% had children under the age of 18 living in them. Of all households, 35.2% were married-couple households, 21.4% were households with a male householder and no spouse or partner present, and 33.1% were households with a female householder and no spouse or partner present. About 33.3% of all households were made up of individuals and 14.4% had someone living alone who was 65 years of age or older.

There were 2,018 housing units, of which 3.9% were vacant. The homeowner vacancy rate was 0.6% and the rental vacancy rate was 3.5%.

Racial composition as of the 2020 census
Race	Number	Percent
White	2,985	61.8%
Black or African American	453	9.4%
American Indian and Alaska Native	13	0.3%
Asian	44	0.9%
Native Hawaiian and Other Pacific Islander	0	0.0%
Some other race	659	13.6%
Two or more races	678	14.0%
Hispanic or Latino (of any race)	1,582	32.7%

=== 2010 census ===
As of the 2010 census, there were 4,597 people living in the borough. The racial makeup of the borough was 81.4% White, 6.6% African American, 0.1% Native American, 0.8% Asian, 0.0% Pacific Islander, 7.7% from other races, and 3.4% from two or more races. Hispanic or Latino of any race were 22.5% of the population.

Historical population
Census	Pop.	Note	%±
1900	1,214		—
1910	1,388		14.3%
1920	2,339		68.5%
1930	4,568		95.3%
1940	4,804		5.2%
1950	5,456		13.6%
1960	5,428		−0.5%
1970	5,384		−0.8%
1980	4,805		−10.8%
1990	4,637		−3.5%
2000	4,614		−0.5%
2010	4,597		−0.4%
2020	4,832		5.1%
2024 (est.)	4,690	▼	−2.9%

United States presidential election results for Fountain Hill, Pennsylvania
Year	Republican		Democratic		Third party(ies)	
Year	No.	%	No.	%	No.	%
2024	825	36.75%	1,392	62.00%	28	1.25%
2020	720	31.97%	1,492	66.25%	40	1.78%
2016	647	32.61%	1,227	61.84%	110	5.54%
2012	557	31.10%	1,200	67.00%	34	1.90%
2008	571	29.09%	1,359	69.23%	33	1.68%
2004	650	33.73%	1,268	65.80%	9	0.47%

== Notable people ==
- Stephen Vincent Benét, former author
- Joseph F. Brennan, former Pennsylvania State Representative
- Edwin Drake, "Father of the Oil industry", first American to drill for crude oil
- Justin D. Jirolanio, former Pennsylvania State Representative and State Senator
- T. J. Rooney, former Pennsylvania State Representative
- Alejandra Feliz, singer, member of the Carlos & Alejandra
