= William Eckensberger =

American politician (born 1928)

William Henry Eckensberger, Jr.

Member of the Pennsylvania House of Representatives from the 133rd district
- In office 1969–1976
- Preceded by: District created
- Succeeded by: Frank Meluski

Member of the Pennsylvania House of Representatives from the Lehigh County district
- In office 1965–1968

Personal details
- Born: April 29, 1928 (age 98) Cementon, Pennsylvania, U.S.
- Party: Democratic

William Henry Eckensberger Jr. (born April 29, 1928) is an American former politician who was a Democratic member of the Pennsylvania House of Representatives.
