= Assistant Secretary of Defense for Homeland Defense and Hemispheric Affairs =

United States government position

United States Assistant Secretary of Defense for Homeland Defense and Hemispheric Affairs
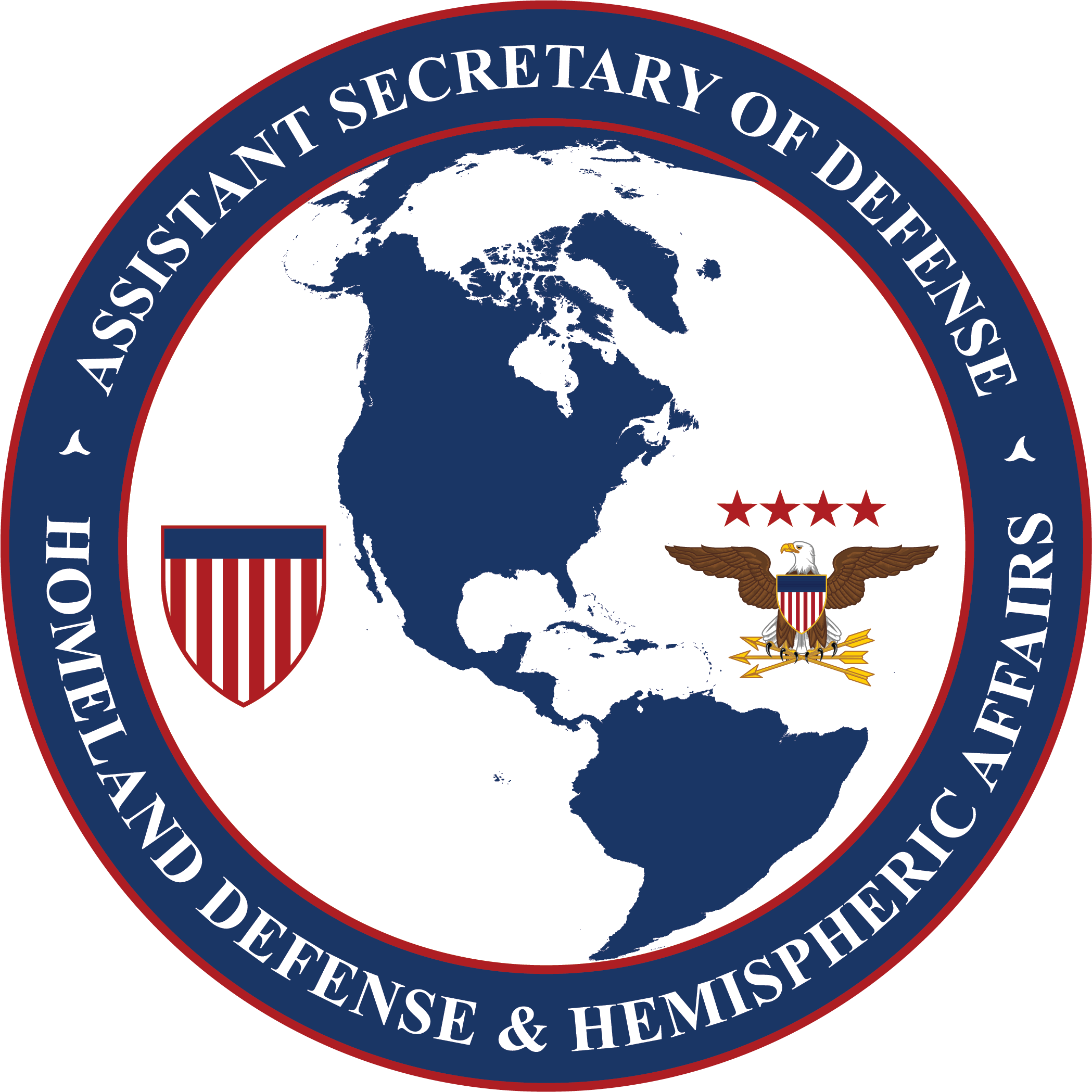
- Seal of the assistant secretary for homeland defense and hemispheric affairs

- Flag of an assistant secretary of defense

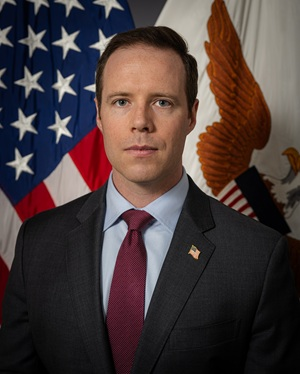
- Incumbent; Mark Ditlevson since May 26, 2026
- United States Department of Defense
- Reports to: United States Secretary of Defense
- Appointer: The president with Senate advice and consent
- Term length: Appointed
- Website: Official website

The assistant secretary of defense for homeland defense and hemispheric affairs, or ASD (HD&HA), is responsible for defense continuity and mission assurance; homeland defense and defense support of civil authorities; Arctic and global resilience; and U.S. defense and security policy for Canada, Mexico, Central America, the Caribbean, and South America.

The position was established by the National Defense Authorization Act for Fiscal Year 2003 (P.L. 107–314, passed 2 December 2002). In particular, the ASD (HD&HA) is responsible for homeland preparedness, oversight of the two combatant commands that cover North and South America, and the transfer of technologies to homeland security use, pursuant to Section 1401 of the 2003 DOD Authorization Act. The ASD (HD&HA) reports to the under secretary of defense for policy.

== Precedent ==
At the end of the Eisenhower administration, a wide-ranging federal reorganization (Reorganization Plan No. 1 of 1958) transferred to the president the civil defense responsibilities and authorities formerly assigned to the Federal Civil Defense Administration. In Executive Order 10952 (signed 20 July 1961), the president delegated these functions to the secretary of defense. The SecDef then created the post of Assistant Secretary of Defense (Civil Defense) on August 31, 1961, to help manage these responsibilities. Only one man, Steuart L. Pittman, ever held this post. His term in office ran September 20, 1961 - April 1, 1964, at which time the post was abolished.

The Office of Civil Defense then transitioned to the secretary of the Army, but responsibility for civil defense was quickly assigned to the new Defense Civil Preparedness Agency (DCPA). After a Carter administration reorganization (Reorganization Plan No. 3 of 19 June 1978) led to the dissolution of DCPA in July 1979, the director of the new Federal Emergency Management Agency assumed responsibility for civil defense. Nevertheless, DoD continued to maintain and develop resources for civil defense, but with dispersed, overlapping, and informal authorities for growing and coordinating them. The ASD (HD&HA) now provides a single point of contact at DoD for FEMA, state and local disaster management agencies, and executive policymakers in the event that these resources need to be enhanced or mobilized.

== Structure ==
The ASD (HD&HA) is supported by four deputy assistant secretaries (DASDs), each with coverage of a different mission area:

- Deputy Assistant Secretary of Defense for Arctic and Global Resilience
- Deputy Assistant Secretary of Defense for Defense Continuity and Mission Assurance (DC&MA)
- Deputy Assistant Secretary of Defense for Homeland Defense Integration & Defense Support of Civil Authorities
- Deputy Assistant Secretary of Defense for Western Hemisphere Affairs

DASDs are appointed by the secretary of defense. Some are appointed from civilian life, while others are career defense officials. Once at the DASD level, the latter are considered a part of the DoD Senior Executive Service.

The ASD (HD&HA) is also supported by a principal deputy, or PDASD, who helps manage the day-to-day operations.

== List of officeholders ==
The table below includes both the various titles of this post over time, as well as all the holders of those offices.

No.	Assistant Secretary		Term			SecDef(s) served under	President(s) served under	Ref(s)
No.	Portrait	Name	Took office	Left office	Term length	SecDef(s) served under	President(s) served under	Ref(s)
Homeland defense
1	Paul McHale	Paul McHale (born 1950)	February 7, 2003	January 20, 2009	5 years, 348 days	Donald H. Rumsfeld; Robert M. Gates	George W. Bush	
Homeland defense and Americas' security affairs
2	Paul N. Stockton	Paul N. Stockton (born 1954)	June 1, 2009	January 22, 2013	3 years, 235 days	Robert M. Gates; Leon Panetta	Barack Obama	
–	Todd M. Rosenblum	Todd M. Rosenblum; Acting	January 22, 2013	September 23, 2014	1 year, 244 days	Leon Panetta; Chuck Hagel	Barack Obama	
Homeland defense and global security
3	Eric Rosenbach	Eric Rosenbach	September 23, 2014	July 6, 2015	286 days	Chuck Hagel; Ash Carter	Barack Obama	
–	Thomas F. Atkin	Thomas F. Atkin; Acting	August 1, 2015	January 20, 2017	1 year, 172 days	Ash Carter	Barack Obama	
–	Peter F. Verga	Peter F. Verga; Acting	January 20, 2017	June 21, 2017	152 days	James Mattis	Donald Trump	
4	Kenneth Rapuano	Kenneth Rapuano	June 21, 2017	January 20, 2021	3 years, 213 days	James Mattis; Mark Esper	Donald Trump	
–	Robert G. Salesses	Robert G. Salesses; Acting	January 20, 2021	April 29, 2021	99 days	Lloyd Austin	Joe Biden	
–	Jennifer C. Walsh	Jennifer C. Walsh; Acting	April 29, 2021	March 4, 2022	309 days	Lloyd Austin	Joe Biden	
Homeland defense and hemispheric affairs
5	Melissa Dalton	Melissa Dalton	March 4, 2022	May 29, 2024	2 years, 86 days	Lloyd Austin	Joe Biden	
–	Rebecca Zimmerman	Rebecca Zimmerman; Acting	May 29, 2024	January 20, 2025	236 days	Lloyd Austin	Joe Biden	
–	Leigh Nolan	Leigh Nolan; Acting	January 20, 2025	January 28, 2025	8 days	Pete Hegseth	Donald Trump	-
–	Rafael Leonardo	Rafael Leonardo; Acting	January 28, 2025	April 21, 2025	83 days	Pete Hegseth	Donald Trump	
–	Mark Ditlevson	Mark Ditlevson; Acting	April 21, 2025	December 2, 2025	225 days	Pete Hegseth	Donald Trump	-
–	Joseph M. Humire	Joseph M. Humire; Acting	December 2, 2025	May 26, 2026	175 days	Pete Hegseth	Donald Trump	-
6	Mark Ditlevson	Mark Ditlevson	May 26, 2026	Incumbent	103 days	Pete Hegseth	Donald Trump	-
