= Frank Meluskey =

American politician

Frank J. Meluskey

Member of the Pennsylvania House of Representatives from the 133rd district
- In office 1977 – November 22, 1978
- Preceded by: William Eckensberger
- Succeeded by: George Kanuck

Personal details
- Born: July 9, 1952 Bethlehem, Pennsylvania, U.S.
- Died: November 22, 1978 (aged 26) Miami Beach, Florida, U.S.
- Party: Democratic

Frank J. Meluskey (July 9, 1952 – November 22, 1978) was a Democratic member of the Pennsylvania House of Representatives. He died in 1978, of a heart condition, congenital aortic valvular stenosis.
