= Daniel McNeill =

American politician (1947-2017)

Daniel T. McNeill

Member of the Pennsylvania House of Representatives from the 133rd district
- In office January 1, 2013 – September 8, 2017
- Preceded by: Joseph F. Brennan
- Succeeded by: Jeanne McNeill

Personal details
- Born: July 19, 1947 Allentown, Pennsylvania
- Died: September 8, 2017 (aged 70) Bethlehem, Pennsylvania
- Party: Democratic
- Spouse: Jeanne
- Occupation: union official
- Website: www.pahouse.com/mcneill/

Daniel T. McNeill (July 19, 1947 – September 8, 2017) was a Democratic member of the Pennsylvania House of Representatives, first elected in 2012. He represented the 133rd district. From 1966 to 1972, McNeill was a member of the Pennsylvania National Guard. McNeill has also served as a commissioner and executive for Whitehall Township, and as Manager of Regional Partnerships for Lehigh County.

McNeill died in Bethlehem, Pennsylvania, on September 8, 2017, at the age of 70.
