= George Kanuck =

American politician

George J. Kanuck

Member of the Pennsylvania House of Representatives from the 133rd district
- In office 1979 – May 6, 1982
- Preceded by: Frank Meluski
- Succeeded by: Paul F. McHale, Jr.

Personal details
- Born: April 26, 1943 (age 83) Marion, Indiana, U.S.
- Party: Republican

George J. Kanuck (born April 26, 1943) is an American former politician and Republican member of the Pennsylvania House of Representatives. He was born in Marion, Indiana.
