= Kenneth Rapuano =

American government official & Marine

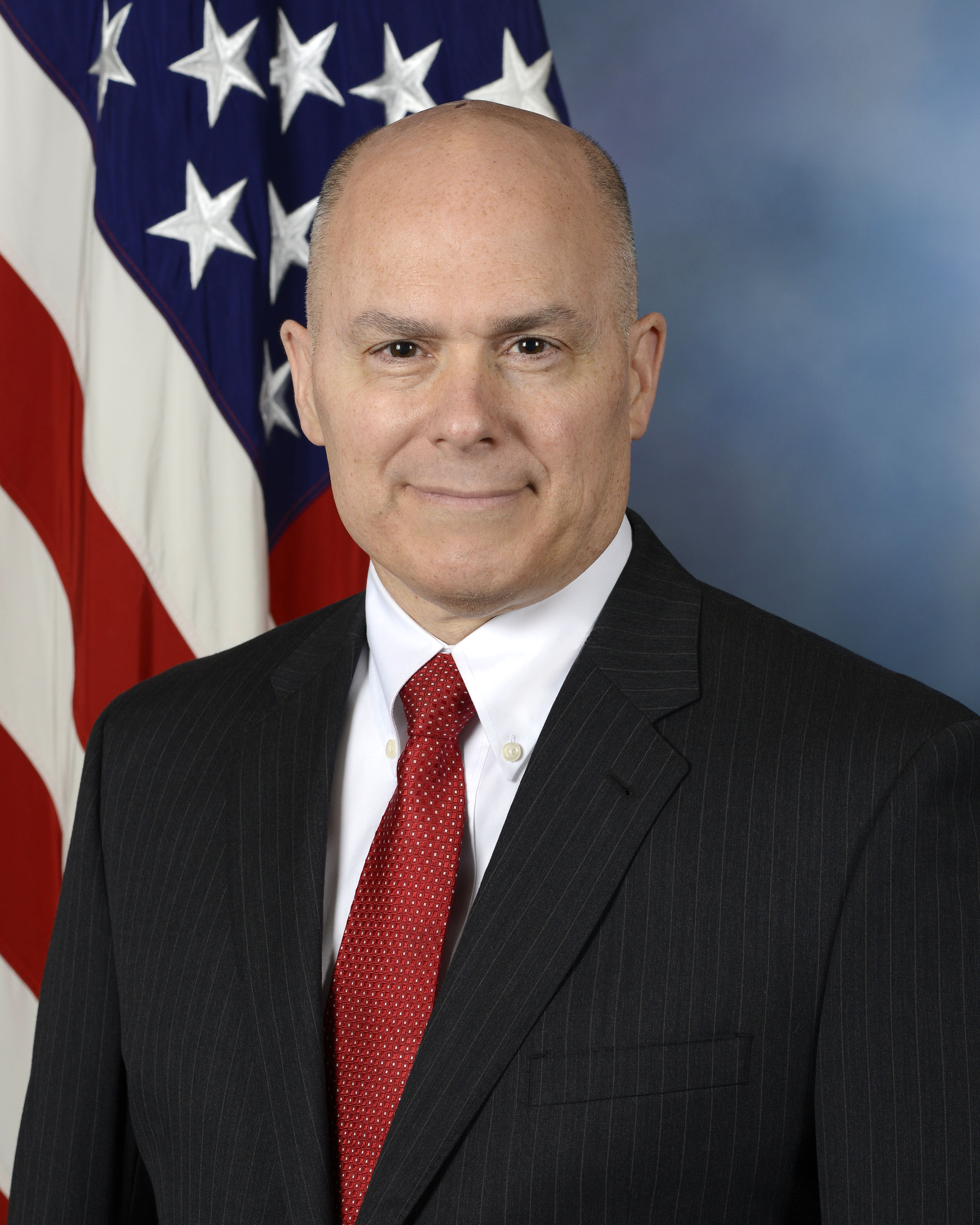

Assistant Secretary of Defense for Homeland Defense and Global Security
- In office June 21, 2017 – January 20, 2021
- President: Donald Trump
- Preceded by: Eric Rosenbach
- Succeeded by: Melissa Dalton

Personal details
- Born: Ridgewood, New Jersey
- Children: 4
- Education: Middlebury College (BS); Georgetown University (MS)

Military service
- Allegiance: United States
- Branch/service: United States Marine Corps
- Years of service: 1984-2005
- Rank: Lieutenant Colonel

Kenneth P. Rapuano is an American Marine who has held various global security-related posts within the U.S. federal government. He most recently served from June 2017 to January 2021 as the Assistant Secretary of Defense for Homeland Defense and Global Security in the United States Department of Defense, having been confirmed by the U.S. Senate on June 12, 2017, by a vote of 95–1.

== Early life and education ==
Rapuano is the son of Alfred and Catherine Rapuano, and a native of Ridgewood, New Jersey, where he graduated from Ridgewood High School in 1980. Following high school, he graduated with a B.S. in Political Science from Middlebury College and an M.S. in National Security Studies from Georgetown University.

== Military ==
Rapuano served 21 years in the United States Marines Corps on active duty and the reserve as an infantryman and intelligence officer with deployments to both Iraq and Afghanistan. He deployed to Iraq in 2003, where he commanded the Joint Interrogation and Debriefing Center of the Iraq Survey Group established to conduct the mission of surveying and exploiting possible weapons of mass destruction activities throughout Iraq. In 2006, he left his position as Deputy Homeland Security Advisor to President George W. Bush to volunteer for active duty deployment to Afghanistan. He deployed as a Marine Corps intelligence officer with the Joint Special Operations Task Force, establishing and directing a targeting fusion center tracking high-value terrorists and insurgents.

== Career ==
Rapuano has previously worked for the think tanks ANSER and Mitre Corporation. At ANSER, he simultaneously served as a Senior Vice President while also acting as the Executive Director of the Studies & Analysis Group. Prior to working for ANSER, he was the President of Homeland Security at ICx Technologies. Rapuano has previously served as the Deputy Homeland Security Advisor to President George W. Bush, the Deputy Undersecretary for Counter-Terrorism at the United States Department of Energy, and as a Special Assistant in International Security Policy in the Office of the Secretary of Defense.
