= Jeanne McNeill =

American politician (born 1960)

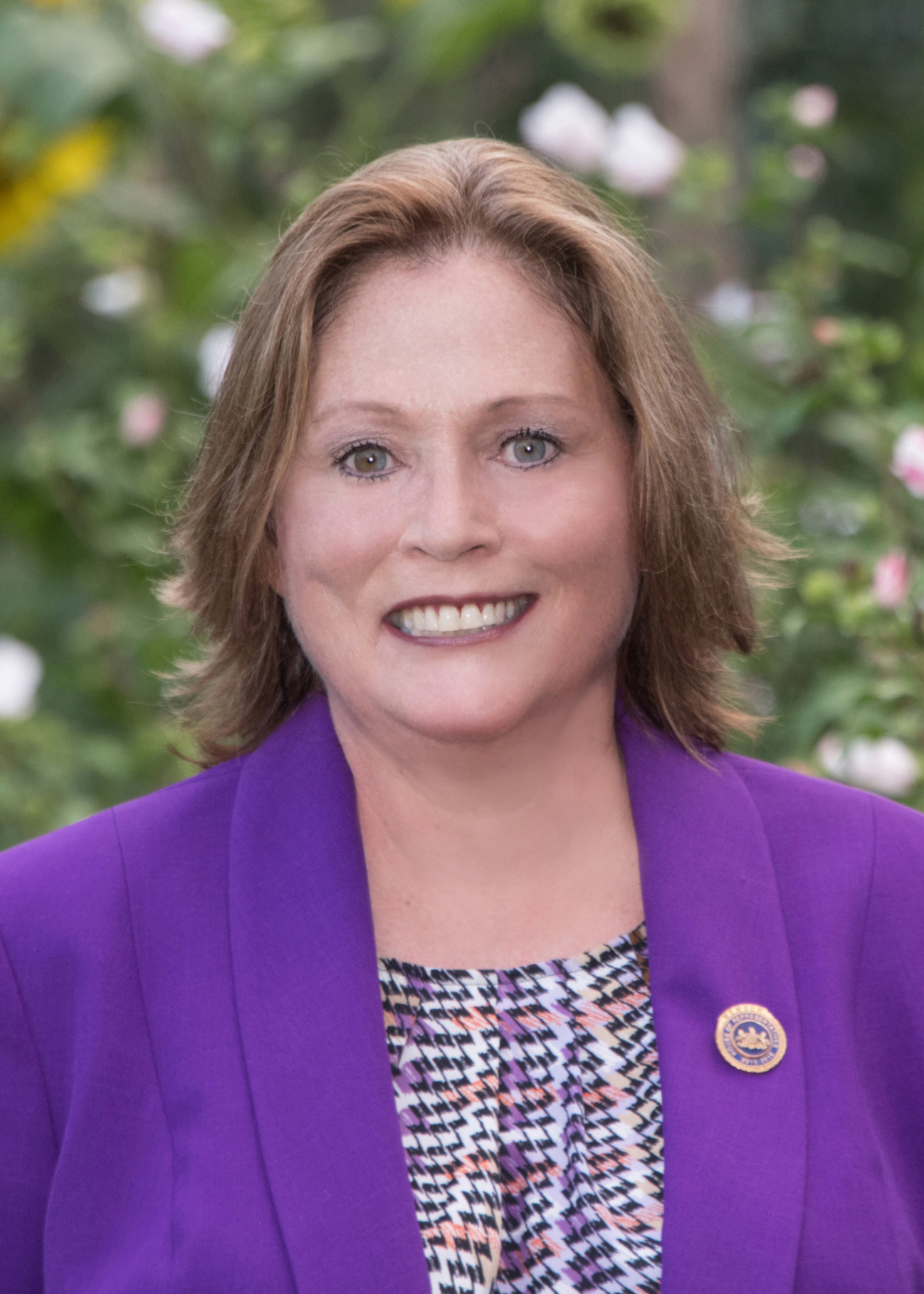
- PA State Representative Jeanne McNeill

Member of the Pennsylvania House of Representatives from the 133rd district
- Incumbent
- Assumed office January 2, 2018
- Preceded by: Daniel McNeill

Personal details
- Born: August 9, 1960 (age 66) Boston, Massachusetts, U.S.
- Party: Democratic
- Spouse: Daniel McNeill (died 2017)
- Children: 2
- Website: www.pahouse.com/mcneill/

Jeanne McNeill (born August 9, 1960) is an American politician who currently represents the 133rd District in the Pennsylvania House of Representatives as a Democrat since 2018.

== Early life ==
McNeill was born on August 9, 1960 in Boston, Massachusetts. She graduated from Freedom High School in 1978.

== Political career ==
Following the 2017 death of her husband, Daniel McNeill, McNeill was nominated by the local Democratic Party to fill his seat in the Pennsylvania House of Representatives. She won the December 5 special election and was sworn in to represent the 133rd District on January 2, 2018. McNeill was reelected to full terms in 2018, 2020, 2022, and 2024. In most of her election bids, she has run unopposed.

== Electoral history ==
2017 Pennsylvania House of Representatives special election, District 133
Party	Candidate	Votes	%
Democratic	Jeanne McNeill	2,302	67.43
Republican	David E. Molony	992	29.06
Libertarian	Samantha X. Dorney	120	3.51
Total votes		3,414	100.00

2018 Pennsylvania House of Representatives election, District 133
Party	Candidate	Votes	%
Democratic	Jeanne McNeill	Unopposed	
Total votes		15,366	100.00

2020 Pennsylvania House of Representatives election, District 133
Party	Candidate	Votes	%
Democratic	Jeanne McNeil	18,844	60.52
Republican	David Molony	12,227	39.27
Write-in		68	0.22
Total votes		31,139	100.00

2022 Pennsylvania House of Representatives election, District 133
Party	Candidate	Votes	%
Democratic	Jeanne McNeill	17,431	94.07
Write-in		1,099	5.93
Total votes		18,530	100.00
