= Katherine McHale =

American politician (born 1955)

Member of the Pennsylvania House of Representatives from the 133rd district
- In office 1991 – November 30, 1992
- Preceded by: Paul McHale
- Succeeded by: T.J. Rooney

Personal details
- Born: June 27, 1955 (age 71) Othello, Washington, U.S.
- Party: Democratic

Katherine P. McHale (born June 27, 1955) is an American communications consultant and former politician. A member of the Democratic Party, she represented the 133rd district in the Pennsylvania House of Representatives from 1991 to 1992. After leaving elected office, McHale pursued a career in public relations and telecommunications, holding senior positions in corporate communications.

== Formative years ==
Born in Othello, Washington on June 27, 1955, McHale earned her Bachelor of Arts degree in communicative arts at Whitworth College (now Whitworth University) in Spokane, Washington in 1977 and her Master of Science degree in telecommunications from Kutztown University of Pennsylvania in Kutztown in 1986. She served in the United States Navy Reserve from 1986 to 1992.

== Career ==
From 1981 to 1985, McHale was a senior producer and manager in the audiovisual department at Air Products and Chemicals (now Air Products). Subsequently employed as a public relations specialist, she became the founder and president of Script-Tech Communications, Inc.

A member of the Lehigh County Democratic Committee, she was elected to the Pennsylvania House of Representatives during a special election on May 21, 1991 to complete the remaining 1991 term of her predecessor and husband, Paul McHale, who had resigned due to his military service in the Persian Gulf. Sworn in on June 4, 1991, she served one term and decided not to run for reelection in 1992.

She was subsequently employed as a communications consultant for the Entigo Corporation. From 2001 to 2004, she was the vice president of marketing and communications for Millennium Cell. She has served as a senior associate for Booz Allen Hamilton since 2004 and has also been a principal consultant with Satori Consulting.
