= Gregory Falco =

American inventor and researcher

- Occupations: Inventor and researcher

Academic background
- Education: Massachusetts Institute of Technology

Academic work
- Discipline: Aerospace, Cybersecurity

Gregory Falco is an American inventor and researcher. Falco is a professor at Cornell University. He is a pioneer in the field of cybersecurity research and its aerospace applications. Falco is the founding chair of the IEEE Standards Association Space System Cybersecurity Working Group, which produced the first international standard on space cybersecurity. He serves as the NATO Country Project Director for the NATO Science for Peace and Security effort to reroute the internet to space.

== Education ==
Falco earned his B.S. from Cornell University in 2010, M.S. from Columbia University in 2012. and Ph.D., from the Massachusetts Institute of Technology in 2018. He completed a predoctoral fellowship with the Cyber Security Project at Harvard University. His postdoctoral research was conducted at the Computer Science and Artificial Intelligence Laboratory (CSAIL) at Massachusetts Institute of Technology and at the Cyber Policy Center at Stanford University. Falco's PhD was funded by NASA's Jet Propulsion Laboratory to develop an AI system to automatically enumerate threats to space mission systems.

== Career ==
He began his career at Accenture where he was an executive in the Strategy & Sustainability practice. While at Accenture, he lectured at Columbia University and taught a course on Smart Cities and the Evolution of Sustainability.

In 2016 Falco co-founded the company NeuroMesh Inc. while at the Massachusetts Institute of Technology. He was listed in Forbes 30 Under 30 in Enterprise Technology for contributions to industrial control security with his company, acquired by Meta Platforms in 2022.

In 2021, Falco joined the faculty at Johns Hopkins University as an assistant professor at their Institute for Assured Autonomy. Falco directed the Aerospace ADVERSARY Laboratory at Johns Hopkins University.

In 2023, Falco joined the faculty at Cornell University as an assistant professor in the Sibley School of Mechanical and Aerospace Engineering and Systems Engineering.

== Research and recognition ==
Falco's main area of work is aerospace security research.

In 2018, his paper Cybersecurity Principles for Space Systems, which included recommendations to reduce the cyber risk of the emergent commercial space sector and informed the United States Space Policy Directive-5, was published in the Journal of Aerospace Information Systems. His work on the topic titled Job One For Space Force: Space Asset Cybersecurity was published by Harvard's Belfer Center.

In 2022, he published a monograph co-authored with Eric Rosenbach on cyber risk management titled Confronting Cyber Risk: An Embedded Endurance Strategy for Cybersecurity. He was awarded a DARPA Young Faculty Award for his project Orbital Resilient Blockchain Interagent Transaction Service (ORBITS) Architecture: A Resilient, Zero-Trust Architecture for Hosted Payloads and Space Infrastructure as a Service. Falco is a member of the Space Systems Critical Infrastructure Working Group hosted by Cybersecurity and Infrastructure Security Agency.

In 2023, Falco was named the founding chair of the Standard for Space Systems Cybersecurity by the IEEE Standards Association. Falco discussed the 2023 Chinese balloon incident as an aerospace security expert with BBC News, Bloomberg News, Australian Broadcasting Corporation, Channel 4 and Vice Media. His paper WannaFly: An Approach to Satellite Ransomware, the first public documentation for how to ransomware a space vehicle, was published in the 2023 IEEE 9th International Conference on Space Mission Challenges for Information Technology.

In 2024, NATO Science for Peace and Security named Falco the NATO Country Director to lead the development of a Hybrid space and submarine architecture to Ensure Information Security to Telecommunications (HEIST). NATO announced the initiative will "make the internet less vulnerable to disruption by rerouting the flow of information into space in the event that undersea cables are attacked or accidentally severed". The project has been described by Bloomberg News as an "effort to save the internet" and that the "Swedish Navy and Icelandic government are among those interested in using the system". The contract to the United States, Sweden, Iceland and Switzerland involves academia, industry and government agencies and according to the South China Morning Post, the project will cost $2.5M dollars. Falco discussed the 2024 Crowdstrike incident as a cybersecurity and critical infrastructure expert with Associated Press, The Wall Street Journal, The Washington Post, Bloomberg News, ABC News and The Daily Telegraph.

In 2026, Falco led the publication of the first international standard for designing secure space systems. The standard was published by IEEE Standards Association and involved technical working group members from over 30 countries. He provided congressional testimony to the United States–China Economic and Security Review Commission on China's data strategy where he described how "pattern-of-life" data that may appear benign is collected by China to assemble intelligence on U.S. technology capabilities.
