= Paul N. Stockton =

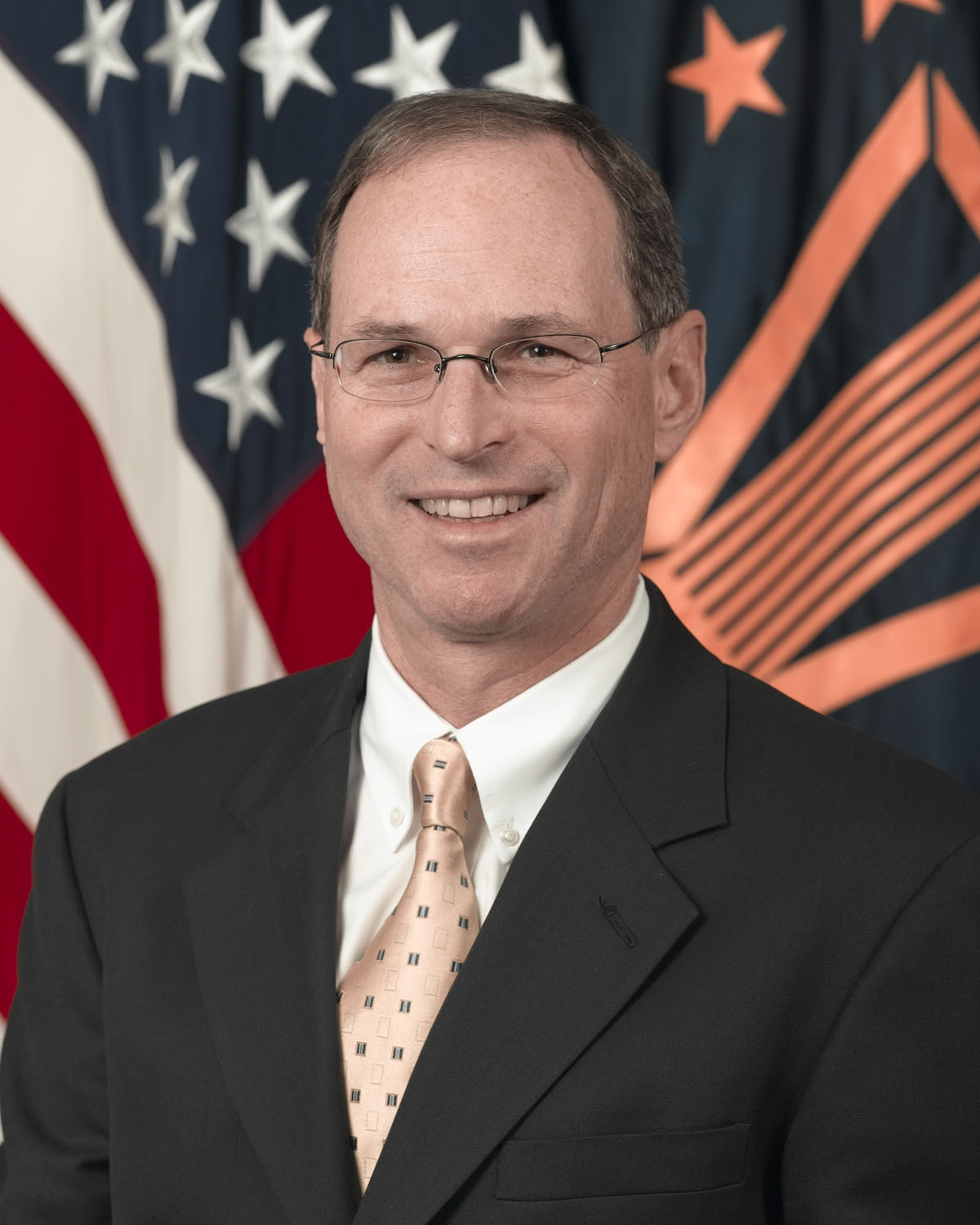

Assistant Secretary of Defense for Homeland Defense
- In office May 18, 2009 – January 22, 2013
- President: Barack Obama
- Preceded by: Paul F. McHale
- Succeeded by: Eric Rosenbach

Personal details
- Born: Paul Noble Stockton; August 10, 1954 (age 72) Los Angeles, California
- Spouse: Christin "Missy" Stockton
- Occupation: President, Paul N Stockton LLC

Dr. Paul N. Stockton (born 10 August, 1954) is the President of Paul N. Stockton LLC, a strategic advisory firm in Santa Fe, NM. He also chairs the Board of Directors of Analytic Services, Inc., is a Senior Fellow of the Johns Hopkins University’s Applied Physics Laboratory, and serves on the Science and Technology and Strategic Advisory Committees of the Idaho National Laboratory.

From 2009 to 2013, Dr. Stockton served as Assistant Secretary of Defense for Homeland Defense and Americas' Security Affairs, where he helped lead the department's response to Hurricane Sandy and other disasters. He was responsible for Defense Critical Infrastructure Protection, Western Hemisphere security policy, domestic crisis management, continuity of operations planning, and a range of other responsibilities. While Assistant Secretary, Dr. Stockton also served as executive director of the Council of Governors.

In September 2013, Secretary of Defense Chuck Hagel appointed Dr. Stockton to co-chair the Independent Review of the Washington Navy Yard Shootings, which recommended fundamental changes to the department's security clearance system that the Department has implemented.

From 2020 to July 2026, Dr. Stockton chaired the Grid Resilience for National Security subcommittee of the Department of Energy's Electricity Advisory Committee. In that capacity, he wrote the Committee's report on "Strengthening the Resilience of Defense Critical Infrastructure" (March 2022) https://www.energy.gov/sites/default/files/2022-03/EAC%20Recommendations%20-%20Strengthening%20DCEI%20Resilience%20-%20Final_508.pdf

From January 2022 to March 2025, Dr. Stockton chaired the Homeland Defense Subcommittee of DOD's Reserve Forces Policy Board. As chair, he led the drafting of the Board's report on "Reserve Component Support for Homeland Defense (August 2024) https://rfpb.defense.gov/Portals/67/Documents/Reports/Cleared%20FINAL%20Consolidated%20RFPB%20HD%20REPORT%20pac.pdf

== Education and early career ==
=== Education ===
Dr. Stockton earned a BA Summa Cum Laude in government from Dartmouth College in June 1976 and a Ph.D. in government from Harvard University in November 1986. He was born in Los Angeles and attended River Falls Senior High in River Falls, Wisconsin before graduating from Highland Park Senior High in Saint Paul, Minnesota in 1972.

=== Early career ===
Dr. Stockton served as a Research Associate for the International Institute for Strategic Studies from 1982 to 1983, and was a Legislative Assistant to Senator Daniel Patrick Moynihan from 1986 to 1989, where he was responsible for foreign relations, defense, and intelligence issues. Dr. Stockton then joined the faculty of the Naval Postgraduate School (NPS) in Monterey, California in 1990. Dr. Stockton held a number of positions at NPS before becoming Associate Provost in 2000. During his NPS tenure, Dr. Stockton founded and led its School of International Graduate Studies, the Center for Homeland Defense and Security, and the Center for Civil-Military Relations.

Dr. Stockton was appointed Senior Research Scholar at Stanford University’s Center for International Security and Cooperation in 2006 and held the position until 2009.

== Assistant Secretary of Defense for Homeland Defense and America’s Security Affairs ==
=== Nomination ===
President Barack Obama nominated Dr. Stockton to be Assistant Secretary of Defense (ASD) for Homeland Defense and America's Security Affairs (HD&ASA) on April 28, 2009, and was confirmed by the Senate on May 18, 2009.

=== Tenure ===
As ASD HD&ASA, Dr. Stockton was responsible for DoD initiatives to strengthen security in the Western Hemisphere and help partner nations build their capacities to meet emerging security challenges. He also guided the Defense Critical Infrastructure Protection program, served as DoD's Domestic Crisis Manager, and helped lead the Department's response to Hurricane Sandy, Deepwater Horizon and other disasters. Dr. Stockton was responsible for DoD policy on domestic counter-terrorism, continuity of operations planning, maritime domain awareness, air sovereignty, and preparedness for chemical, biological radiological and nuclear events.

From 2010 until January 2013, Dr. Stockton also served as executive director of the Council of Governors, where he helped Governors, the National Guard, DoD, the Department of Homeland Security and the Federal Emergency Management Agency adopt initiatives to strengthen Federal-State collaboration and unity of effort. These initiatives were codified into law in the National Defense Authorization Act of 2012, Section 515.

From 2009 to 2012, Dr. Stockton served as the Acting U.S. Co-chair of the Canada-U.S. Permanent Joint Board of Defense, the premier organization for defense policy coordination between the two Nations.

=== Accomplishments and awards ===
Dr. Stockton was awarded the Department of Defense Medal for Distinguished Public Service, DoD's highest civilian award, in 2011 and again in 2013. The Department of Homeland Security also awarded Dr. Stockton its Distinguished Public Service Medal. While ASD, Stockton led the teams that created the Department's first-ever Mission Assurance Strategy, the Complex Catastrophe Initiative for defense support to civil authorities in extreme events, and the implementation of installation and personnel security measures following the shootings at Fort Hood in 2009.

== Private sector consulting ==
Dr. Stockton is President of Paul N Stockton LLC, a strategic advisory firm in Santa Fe, NM. In this role, Dr. Stockton provides strategic advice to industry and government clients on critical infrastructure and international security issues. He also performs studies, prepares expert testimony and regulatory filings, and contributes to the design and execution of infrastructure resilience and cybersecurity exercises. From 2013 to 2020, he served as the managing director of Sonecon, LLC, a security and economic advisory firm in Washington, DC. In July 2023, Stockton testified before the U.S. House Energy and Commerce Subcommittee on Oversight and Investigations at the Examining Emerging Threats to Electric Energy Infrastructure hearing.

== Activities and organizations ==
Dr. Stockton helped the Federal Emergency Management Agency and Department of Homeland Security develop the Emergency Support Function #14 – Cross-Sector Business and Infrastructure Annex and served as contributing editor to the 4th Edition of the National Response Framework.

Dr. Stockton was a member of the Defense Science Board’s Task Force on Cyber Deterrence and contributed to its 2017 Final Report. Dr. Stockton has served on the Homeland Security Advisory Council and co-authored its 2016 report on cyber incident response. Dr. Stockton is also a Senior Fellow at the Johns Hopkins University Applied Physics Laboratory and chairs the Board of Directors for Analytic Services, Inc. He also serves on advisory boards for the Idaho National Laboratory and other organizations. Dr. Stockton also co-chaired the DoD's Independent Review of the Washington Navy Yard Shooting, released March 2014.

In November 2023, ANSER announced Stockton as its incoming chair of the board of directors, with the appointment announced during the organization’s 65th anniversary celebration.

== Publications ==
Weathering the Storm: Strategic Power Islanding Against Cascading Blackouts (Laurel, MD: Johns Hopkins University Applied Physics Laboratory, August 2026), https://www.jhuapl.edu/sites/default/files/2026-07/Weathering-the-Storm-WEB.pdf

Surfing the Wave: Resilience Strategies for the Decentralizing Grid (Laurel, MD: Johns Hopkins University Applied Physics Laboratory, 2025),

Reserve Component Support for Homeland Defense (Washington, DC: DOD Reserve Forces Policy Board, August 2024),

Blackstart for Greener Grid (Washington, DC: Electric Infrastructure Security Council, 2024),

Defeating Coercive Information Operations in Future Crises (Laurel, MD: Johns Hopkins University Applied Physics Laboratory, August 2021),

Securing the Grid from Supply-Chain Based Attacks (Idaho Falls: Idaho National Laboratory, September 2020),

Strengthening the Cyber Resilience of North American Energy Systems (Washington, DC: The Wilson Center, September 2020),

“Strengthening Mission Assurance Against Emerging Threats: Critical Gaps and Opportunities for Progress” Joint Forces Quarterly (Issue 95, 4th Quarter 2019), pp. 22–31, with John Paczkoski,

"Resilience for Grid Security Emergencies: Opportunities for Industry-Government Collaboration," published by the Johns Hopkins University Applied Physics Laboratory(APL). This follows Dr. Stockton's 2016 "Super Storm Sandy: Implications for Designing a Post Cyber Attack Power Restoration System" report for APL.

Dr. Stockton is also the Principal Author and Editor in Chief of the Electric Infrastructure Security Council's Electric Grid Protection Handbook series. The most recent Handbook (III), “Cross-Sector Coordination and Communications in Black Sky Events,” was published in June 2018.

In 2014, Dr. Stockton authored "Responding to a Cyber Attack on the North American Electric Grid," Chapter 5 of the Bipartisan Policy Center's Electric Grid Cybersecurity Initiative. Dr. Stockton also authored "Resilience for Black Sky Days: Supplementing Reliability Metrics for Extraordinary and Hazardous Events," a study published by the National Association of Regulatory Utility Commissioners. The report proposes criteria for strengthening resilience against "black sky days": i.e., extraordinary and hazardous catastrophes utterly unlike the blue sky days during which utilities typically operate.

Dr. Stockton co-authored DoD's “Independent Review of the Washington Navy Yard Shooting” published in November 2013. Dr. Stockton was also the lead co-author of “Prosecuting Cyberterrorists: Applying Traditional Jurisdictional Frameworks to a Modern Threat,” Stanford Law & Policy Review, and “Curbing the Market for Cyber Weapons,” published by Yale Law and Policy Review, and has published in International Security, Political Science Quarterly, Homeland Security Affairs (which he helped found in 2005), and other peer-reviewed journals and edited volumes.

== See also ==
Stockton's statement to the media regarding his security recommendations from the Independent Review of the Washington Navy Yard Shooting
