= Bethlehem Silk Mill =

- U.S. National Register of Historic Places
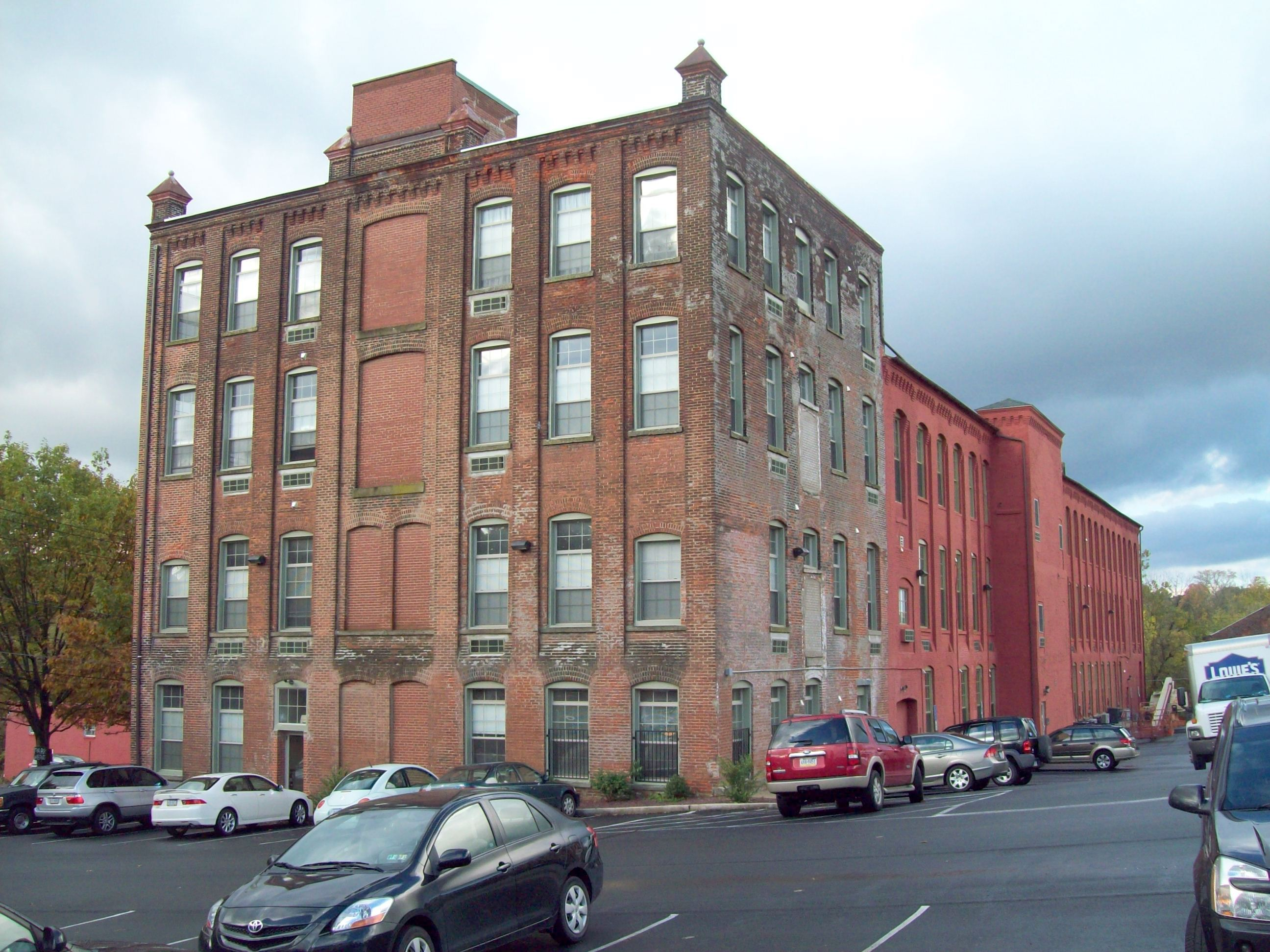
- Bethlehem Silk Mill, October 2011

- Location within Pennsylvania Location within the United States
- Location: 238 W. Goepp St., Bethlehem, Pennsylvania
- Coordinates: 40°37′37″N 75°23′5″W
- Area: 2 acres (0.81 ha)
- Built: 1890, c. 1896, c. 1901
- Architectural style: Late Victorian
- NRHP reference No.: 05000065
- Added to NRHP: February 15, 2005

Bethlehem Silk Mill is a historic silk mill complex located in Bethlehem, Northampton County, Pennsylvania. It was built in 1886, and expanded about 1896 and about 1901. The complex once consisted of a total of seven interconnected historic buildings that formed an open rectangular plan around two central courtyards. Some of the buildings have been demolished. All of the buildings were constructed of red brick with stone foundations.

It was added to the National Register of Historic Places in 2005.
