= T. J. Rooney =

American politician (born 1964)

T.J. Rooney
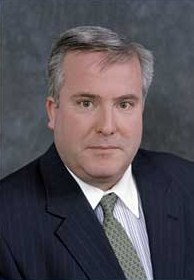

Member of the Pennsylvania House of Representatives from the 133rd district
- In office January 5, 1993 – November 30, 2006
- Preceded by: Katherine McHale
- Succeeded by: Joseph Brennan

Chair of the Pennsylvania Democratic Party
- In office March 20, 2003 – June 19, 2010
- Preceded by: Allen Kukovich
- Succeeded by: Jim Burn

Personal details
- Born: December 9, 1964 (age 61) Garden City, New York, U.S.
- Party: Democratic
- Spouse: Kathleen Stilin-Rooney
- Relatives: Fred B. Rooney (uncle)
- Education: Catawba College (attended)

T.J. Rooney (born December 9, 1964) is the former chairman of the Pennsylvania Democratic Party and a former member of the Pennsylvania House of Representatives.

== Early life and education ==
Rooney was born December 9, 1964, in Garden City, New York. He attended West Essex High School in North Caldwell, New Jersey, graduating in 1983, and then Catawba College in Salisbury, North Carolina.

== Career ==
In 1992, Rooney was elected to the Pennsylvania House of Representatives, where he represented the 133rd legislative district.

He retired prior to the 2006 elections. He is currently Managing Director of the Tri State Strategies PA, L.L.C., a Pennsylvania lobbying organization.

=== Awards and accolades ===
He was named runner-up for the 2003 Pennsylvania politician of the year by PoliticsPA, a political website, which noted the statewide success of the Democratic Party in winning five of six statewide judicial races and electing Dan Onorato and reelecting John Street. Pennsylvania Report cited his role in Barack Obama's winning of Pennsylvania in the 2008 presidential election. In 2010, he was named one of the "Top 10 Democrats" in Pennsylvania by Politics magazine.

=== Personal life ===
Rooney is a nephew of former Lehigh Valley-area Congressman Fred B. Rooney.
