= Joseph F. Brennan =

American politician (born 1964)

Member of the Pennsylvania House of Representatives from the 133rd district
- In office January 2, 2007 – 2013
- Preceded by: T.J. Rooney
- Succeeded by: Daniel McNeill

Personal details
- Born: January 12, 1964 (age 62) Lehigh County, Pennsylvania
- Party: Democratic
- Spouse: Norma Jane
- Children: 2 children
- Education: Moravian College

Joseph F. "Joe" Brennan (born January 12, 1964) is former a Democratic member of the Pennsylvania House of Representatives for the 133rd legislative district.

== Biography ==
Brennan attended Moravian College, graduating in 1986.

Prior to elective office, he served as chief of staff for former Pennsylvania State Representative T.J. Rooney. He also was a member of the Northampton City Council from 1998 through 2002.

He was elected in 2006.

After allegations that he assaulted his wife and then drove drunk from the scene of the incident, Brennan announced that he was withdrawing from his bid for reelection.
