= Homeland security =

United States notion of safety from terrorism

An American national security policy, homeland security is "the national effort to ensure a homeland that is safe, secure, and resilient against terrorism and other hazards where American interests, aspirations, and ways of life can thrive" to the "national effort to prevent terrorist attacks within the United States, reduce the vulnerability of the U.S. to terrorism, and minimize the damage from attacks that do occur." According to an official work published by the Congressional Research Service in 2013, the "Homeland security" term's definition has varied over time.

Homeland security is not constrained to terrorist incidents. Terrorism is violent, criminal acts committed by individuals and/or groups to further ideological goals stemming from influences, such as those of a political, religious, social, racial, or environmental nature. Within the US, an all-hazards approach exists regarding homeland security endeavors. In this sense, homeland security encompasses both natural disasters and man-made events. Thus, the domain of homeland security must accommodate a plethora of situations and scenarios, ranging from natural disasters (e.g., Hurricane Katrina, Irma) to acts of terrorism (e.g., Boston Marathon bombing, September 11 attacks).

The term came about following enactment of the Homeland Security Act of 2002 and reorganization of many U.S. government civil agencies effective March 1, 2003, to form the United States Department of Homeland Security (DHS) after the September 11 attacks, and may refer to the actions of that department, the United States Senate Committee on Homeland Security and Governmental Affairs, or the United States House of Representatives Committee on Homeland Security.

The term "Homeland security" is not to be confused with the U.S. Department of Homeland Security. In its February 15, 2001 report, the U.S. Commission on National Security/21st Century, said the United States must change how it operates in the area of homeland security. The report recommended the creation of what was ultimately called the Department of Homeland Security."

DHS was formed by the Homeland security Act of 2002. The term, homeland security, is not the same as the Department of Homeland Security (DHS). DHS is an executive branch agency. The Senate Committee on Homeland Security and Governmental Affairs, and the House Committee on Homeland Security are both legislative bodies, and thus are clearly distinct from the executive agency, DHS. The actions of these two legislative bodies are not the same as actions of DHS.

Homeland defense (HD) is the military protection of U.S. territory, sovereignty, domestic population, and critical infrastructure against external threats and aggression.

== Definition ==
"Despite the [published] definition, mission statement, and vision [all of which have changed since 9/11], there is no consensus among practitioners and the public as to what the term Homeland Security actually means. Different groups view it differently. The extremes of opinion are represented, for the narrow view, by those who feel homeland security is only about terrorism. They believe focusing on anything additional dilutes, distracts, and weakens the homeland security mission."

Others say its focus is terrorism and natural disasters. Still others claim homeland security is about 'all hazards' (terrorism, man-made disasters, and natural disasters). To some, homeland security is focused on 'jurisdictional hazards' (i.e. homeland security means different things to different jurisdictions depending upon that jurisdiction's particular hazards, risks, and level of preparedness). Examples of some of the jurisdictional hazards include hurricanes, tornados, flooding, and earthquakes. At the other extreme, the broad view of homeland security advocates that homeland security is about everything – that it implicates almost every sector."

== In the United States ==
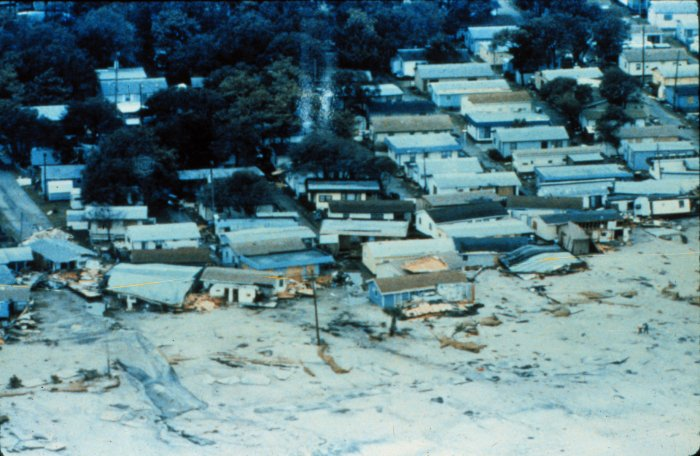
Damage from Hurricane Hugo in a mobile home community

Following the emergency response to Hurricane Hugo in 1989 and Hurricane Andrew in 1992 policy makers in Washington publicly voiced their frustration. A number of reforms were initiated to improve the effectiveness of the disaster relief system in the United States. In the United States, the concept of "Homeland Security" extends and recombines responsibilities of government agencies and entities. According to Homeland security research, the U.S. federal Homeland Security and Homeland Defense includes 187 federal agencies and departments, including the National Guard of the United States, the Federal Emergency Management Agency, the United States Coast Guard, U.S. Customs and Border Protection, U.S. Immigration and Customs Enforcement, United States Citizenship and Immigration Services, the United States Secret Service, the Transportation Security Administration, the 14 agencies that constitute the U.S. intelligence community and Civil Air Patrol. Although many businesses now operate in the area of homeland security, it is overwhelmingly a government function.

The George W. Bush administration consolidated many of these activities under the United States Department of Homeland Security (DHS), a new cabinet department established as a result of the Homeland Security Act of 2002. However, much of the nation's homeland security activity remains outside of DHS; for example, the FBI and CIA are not part of the Department, and other executive departments such as the Department of Defense and United States Department of Health and Human Services and they play a significant role in certain aspects of homeland security. Homeland security is coordinated at the White House by the Adviser to the President for National Security and the Adviser to the President for Terrorism and Homeland Security. The staff of the National Security Council manages policy integration of National Security and Homeland Security. Homeland security is officially defined by the National Strategy for Homeland Security as "a concerted national effort to prevent terrorist attacks within the United States, reduce America's vulnerability to terrorism, and minimize the damage and recover from attacks that do occur". Because the Department of Homeland Security includes the Federal Emergency Management Agency, it also has responsibility for preparedness, response, and recovery to natural disasters.

According to the U.S. Office of Management and Budget and Homeland Security Research Corporation, DHS Homeland security funding constitutes about 20-21 percent of the consolidated U.S. Homeland Security - Homeland Defense funding, while approximately 40 percent of the DHS budget funds civil, non-security activities, such as the U.S. coast guard search and rescue operations and customs functions. The U.S. Homeland Security is the world's largest Homeland counter terror organization, having 40 percent of the global fiscal year homeland security funding.

The term Homeland security became prominent in the United States following the September 11 attacks. It had been used only in limited policy circles prior to these attacks. The phrase "security of the American homeland" appears in the 1998 report Catastrophic Terrorism: Elements of a National Policy by Ash Carter, John M. Deutch, and Philip D. Zelikow. Homeland security is also usually used to connote the civilian aspect of this effort. While homeland defense refers to its military component, led chiefly by the United States Northern Command, which is headquartered in Colorado Springs, Colorado.

The scope of homeland security includes:

- Emergency preparedness and response (for both terrorism and natural disasters), including volunteer medical, police, emergency management, and fire personnel;
- Domestic and International intelligence activities, largely today within the FBI;
- Critical infrastructure, including physical/perimeter and cyber protection;
- Investigation of people making and distributing child pornography;
- Border control, including land, maritime and country borders (also known as Ports of Entry (PoEs). Border management has two key goals: facilitating the flow of legitimate trade and traveling, while ensuring legitimate immigration;
- Transportation and logistics security, including aviation, maritime, and land transportation; As higher volumes of cargoes are processed at the borders each year, security risks also increase. In fact, illegitimate entities such as money laundering, drug trafficking, contraband and human trafficking cartels strategically select busy ports of entry and high traffic times, seeking to penetrate the borders;
- Biodefense;
- Detection of radioactive and radiological materials;
- Research on next-generation security technologies.
- Investigation on Transnational Criminal Organizations (TCOs) involved in human trafficking, drug trafficking, contraband, money laundering, extortion;

=== Criticism ===
Conflicts exist between bodies of international law (ratified by the United States or not) and those applied under "homeland security". One example is the notion of an unlawful combatant. The United States government has created a new status that addresses prisoners captured by a military force who do not conform with the conditions of the Convention. While the United States has only been a signatory to portions of the Geneva Conventions, much international law is based upon it.

=== As a field of study ===
Shortly after the September 11 attacks, homeland security also took off as an up-and-coming academic field with a number of schools in the United States offering academic certificate and degree programs in homeland security. The field is often studied alongside emergency management due to their similar nature and purposes. With the relatively sudden growth of the field, the quality of the programs vary greatly from one another along with their respective accreditation statuses (or lack thereof). In a partial effort to combat these variations, the International Association of Emergency Managers offers a scholarship program with the aim of nurturing, promoting and developing disaster preparedness and resistance by furthering the education of students studying the fields of emergency management, disaster management or related programs such as homeland security.

Homeland security is often thought of as referring to the role of the United States' reformed national security infrastructure beginning in 2003. However, neither the term nor the concept of homeland security are specific to the United States. Though terminology varies, an equivalent may be seen in Israel's Ministry of Public Security. Within the academic field, homeland security is sometimes studied by scholars of comparative politics or criminal justice in a comparative context. For example, the British political scientist Paul Wilkinson edited and contributed to a textbook on Homeland Security policy and practice from a British perspective. The scholar Nadav Morag looks at a global perspective on homeland security management and strategies in the book Comparative Homeland Security: Global Lessons.

=== Professional Certification ===
Certified Homeland Protection Professional is a professional certification established by the National Sheriffs' Association in partnership with the National Domestic Preparedness Coalition, through the Global Center for Threat, Risk, and Vulnerability.

== See also ==
- Civil defense
- High policing
- Infrastructure security
- Port security
- Supply chain security

U.S. specific:

- History of homeland security in the United States
- Civil defense in the United States
- Homeland Security Act
- Homeland defense
- Center for Homeland Defense and Security (school in California)
- National security of the United States
