= Homeland defense =

Homeland defense (HD) is the protection of a territory, sovereignty, domestic population, and critical infrastructure against external threats and aggression. (Definition will be incorporated into JP 3-26 upon its approval).

Homeland security (HS) is a concerted national effort to prevent terrorist attacks, reduce a nation's vulnerability to terrorism, and minimize the damage and recover from attacks that do occur.

== Full definition ==
"Homeland defense (HD) is the protection of a sovereignty, territory, domestic population, and critical defense infrastructure against external threats and aggression, or other threats as directed by the leader of that nation such as the president of the United States. The United States Department of Defense is partially responsible for the Homeland defense mission of the United States, and therefore leads the HD response, with other departments and agencies in support of DOD efforts."

== Threat strategy ==
HD strategic threat environment is based on the following conditions and profiles:

- Diminished protection afforded by geographic distances
- Traditional threats remain
- Greater risk of a weapon of mass destruction attack
- Increased potential for miscalculation and surprise
- Increased potential for terrorist attacks
- Increased challenges from weak and failing states and non-state actors
- Increasing diversity in sources and unpredictability of the locations of conflict
- Threats to US vital interests overseas
- Increasing transnational.

Responses to the changes in any of the above can affect US's international environment through the application of diplomatic, economic, military, and informational means. Thus, a proactive and comprehensive approach to HD is required for US's response.

== See also ==
- National Strategy for Homeland Security
- Air Forces Northern National Security Emergency Preparedness Directorate
