= Assistant Secretary of Defense for International Security Affairs =

United States government position

United States Assistant Secretary of Defense for International Security Affairs
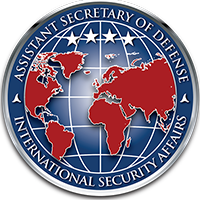
- Seal of the assistant secretary of defense for international security affairs

- Flag of an assistant secretary of defense

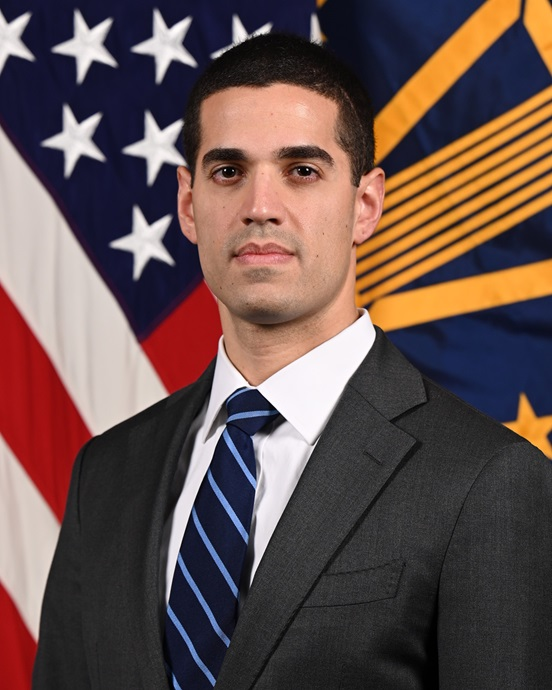
- Incumbent; Alexander Velez-Green (Performing the Duties of) since July 26, 2026
- United States Department of Defense
- Reports to: United States Secretary of Defense
- Appointer: The president; with Senate advice and consent
- Term length: Appointed
- Inaugural holder: John H. Ohly
- Formation: March 27, 1949
- Website: Official website

In the United States, the assistant secretary of defense for international security affairs or ASD (ISA) is the principal advisor to the under secretary of defense for policy (USD (P)) and the secretary of defense on international security strategy and policy on issues of Department of Defense (DoD) interest related to the governments and defense establishments of the nations and international organizations of Europe (including the North Atlantic Treaty Organization), the Middle East, Africa, and the Western Hemisphere. The ASD (ISA) also oversees security cooperation programs and foreign military sales programs in these regions. Despite the broad title of the office, the ASD (ISA) does not develop policy related to Asia, the Pacific region, Latin America, or South America.

== Responsibilities ==
According to a description provided by the Office of the USD (P), the ASD (ISA) shall:

- Conduct and manage day-to-day, multilateral, regional, and bilateral defense relations with all foreign governments in assigned areas of responsibility.
- Develop regional security and defense strategy and policy, provide advice, and issue guidance to translate global and functional policies into regional-specific country strategies, and oversee their implementation in coordination with cognizant DoD officials.
- For countries in assigned areas of responsibility, develop, coordinate, and oversee the implementation of:
  - Defense security policy and management of defense and military relations
  - Policy, plans, and activities, as well as uses of DoD resources engaged in encouraging the development of military capabilities, constitutional democracy and respect for human rights, including civilian control of the military, institutionalizing an appropriate role for the military in a constitutional democracy, and encouraging the development of standards of military professionalism that promote respect for elected civilian authorities and human rights.
  - DoD policy and recommendations concerning security cooperation programs and organizations, foreign military sales, military education and training, and other missions pertaining to security cooperation program relationships.
- Develop, coordinate, and oversee the implementation of policy related to NATO, Euro-Atlantic Partnership Council, the Partnership for Peace, and other institutions with a security dimension including the European Union, Organization for Security and Cooperation in Europe (OSCE), and the African Union.
- Provide policy guidance and oversight to the defense advisor, U.S. mission to NATO, and representative of the secretary of defense representative to the OSCE on behalf of the under secretary of defense for policy. Promote coordination, cooperation, and joint planning on nuclear policy and strategy with NATO allies, in coordination with the assistant secretary of defense for special operations/low intensity conflict and interdependent capabilities.
- Support the NATO Nuclear Planning Group and its subordinate body, the High Level Group and chair the High Level Group.
- Represent the under secretary of defense for policy and the secretary of defense in interagency policy deliberations and international negotiations dealing with assigned areas of responsibility.
- Monitor and provide policy recommendations related to the conduct of U.S. military operations in the countries or regions of focus or on the participation of such countries in operations outside of the region.
- Perform such other functions as the under secretary of defense for policy or the secretary of defense may prescribe.

== Officeholders ==
The table below includes both the various titles of this post over time, as well as all the holders of those offices.

Assistant secretaries of defense (international security affairs)
Name	Tenure	SecDef(s) served under	President(s) served under
Assistant to the Secretary of Defense (International Security Affairs)
John H. Ohly	March 27, 1949 – December 1, 1949	Louis A. Johnson	Harry S. Truman
Maj. Gen. James H. Burns (USA)	December 6, 1949 – August 27, 1951	Louis A. Johnson; George Marshall	Harry S. Truman
Frank C. Nash	August 28, 1951 – February 10, 1953	George Marshall; Robert A. Lovett; Charles E. Wilson	Harry S. Truman; Dwight D. Eisenhower
Assistant Secretary of Defense (International Security Affairs)
Frank C. Nash	February 11, 1953 – February 28, 1954	Charles E. Wilson	Dwight D. Eisenhower
H. Struve Hensel	March 5, 1954 – June 30, 1955	Charles E. Wilson	Dwight D. Eisenhower
Gordon Gray	July 14, 1955 – February 27, 1957	Charles E. Wilson	Dwight D. Eisenhower
Mansfield D. Sprague	February 28, 1957 – October 3, 1958	Charles E. Wilson; Neil H. McElroy	Dwight D. Eisenhower
John N. Irwin II	October 4, 1958 – January 20, 1961	Neil H. McElroy; Thomas S. Gates Jr.	Dwight D. Eisenhower
Paul Nitze	January 29, 1961 – November 29, 1963	Robert McNamara	John F. Kennedy; Lyndon B. Johnson
William Bundy	November 29, 1963 – March 14, 1964	Robert McNamara	Lyndon B. Johnson
John T. McNaughton	July 1, 1964 – July 19, 1967	Robert McNamara	Lyndon B. Johnson
Paul Warnke	August 1, 1967 – February 15, 1969	Robert McNamara; Clark Clifford; Melvin Laird	Lyndon B. Johnson; Richard Nixon
G. Warren Nutter	March 4, 1969 – January 30, 1973	Melvin Laird; Elliot Richardson	Richard Nixon
Lawrence Eagleburger (Acting)	January 31, 1973 – May 10, 1973	Elliot Richardson	Richard Nixon
Robert C. Hill	May 11, 1973 – January 5, 1974	Elliot Richardson; James R. Schlesinger	Richard Nixon
Vice Adm. Raymond E. Peet (Acting)	January 6, 1974 – April 1, 1974	James R. Schlesinger	Richard Nixon
Amos Jordan (Acting)	April 2, 1974 – June 4, 1974	James R. Schlesinger	Richard Nixon
Robert Ellsworth	June 5, 1974 – December 22, 1975	James R. Schlesinger; Donald Rumsfeld	Richard Nixon; Gerald Ford
Amos Jordan (Acting)	December 23, 1975 – May 5, 1976	Donald Rumsfeld	Gerald Ford
Eugene V. McAuliffe	May 6, 1976 – April 1, 1977	Donald Rumsfeld; Harold Brown	Gerald Ford; Jimmy Carter
David E. McGiffert	April 4, 1977 – January 20, 1981	Harold Brown	Jimmy Carter
Bing West	April 4, 1981 – April 1, 1983	Caspar Weinberger	Ronald Reagan
Richard Armitage	April 2, 1983 – June 5, 1983 (Acting); June 5, 1983 – June 5, 1989	Caspar Weinberger; Frank Carlucci; William Howard Taft IV (Acting); Dick Cheney	Ronald Reagan; George H. W. Bush
Harry Rowen	June 26, 1989 – July 31, 1991	Dick Cheney	George H. W. Bush
James R. Lilley	December 12, 1991 – January 20, 1993	Dick Cheney	George H. W. Bush
Assistant Secretary of Defense (Regional Security Affairs)
Charles W. Freeman Jr.	July 6, 1993 – April 11, 1994	Les Aspin; William Perry	Bill Clinton
Assistant Secretary of Defense (International Security Affairs)
Charles W. Freeman Jr.	April 11, 1994 – September 14, 1994	William Perry	Bill Clinton
Joseph Nye	September 15, 1994 – December 16, 1995	William Perry	Bill Clinton
Franklin D. Kramer	March 29, 1996 – February 16, 2001	William Perry; William Cohen; Donald Rumsfeld	Bill Clinton; George W. Bush
Peter Rodman	July 16, 2001 – March 2, 2007	Donald Rumsfeld; Robert Gates	George W. Bush
Mary Beth Long	March 3, 2007 – December 21, 2007 (Acting); December 21, 2007 – January 20, 2009	Robert Gates	George W. Bush
Michael W. Coulter (Acting)	January 20, 2009 – April 3, 2009	Robert Gates	Barack Obama
Alexander Vershbow	April 3, 2009 – February 10, 2012	Robert Gates	Barack Obama
Derek Chollet	June 1, 2012 – January 15, 2015	Chuck Hagel	Barack Obama
Elissa Slotkin (Acting)	January 15, 2015 – January 20, 2017	Chuck Hagel Ash Carter	Barack Obama
Kenneth B. Handelman (Acting)	January 20, 2017 – June 7, 2017	Jim Mattis	Donald Trump
Robert Karem	June 7, 2017 – October 31, 2018	Jim Mattis	Donald Trump
Kathryn L. Wheelbarger (Acting)	October 31, 2018 – July 4, 2020	Jim Mattis; Mark Esper	Donald Trump
Michael C. Ryan (Acting)	July 5, 2020 – August 31, 2020	Mark Esper	Donald Trump
Michael Cutrone (Acting)	September 1, 2020 – January 20, 2021	Mark Esper	Donald Trump
Laura Cooper (Acting)	January 20, 2021 – February 9, 2021	Lloyd Austin	Joe Biden
Mara Karlin (Acting)	February 9, 2021 – August 17, 2021	Lloyd Austin	Joe Biden
Laura Cooper (Acting)	August 17, 2021 – December 17, 2021	Lloyd Austin	Joe Biden
Ilan Goldenberg (Acting)	December 17, 2021 – February 22, 2022	Lloyd Austin	Joe Biden
Celeste Wallander	February 22, 2022 – January 20, 2025	Lloyd Austin	Joe Biden
Katherine Thompson (Performing The Duties Of)	January 20, 2025 – July 8, 2025	Pete Hegseth	Donald Trump
Daniel Zimmerman	July 8, 2025 – Incumbent	Pete Hegseth	Donald Trump
Alexander Velez-Green (Performing The Duties Of)	July 26, 2026 – Incumbent	Pete Hegseth	Donald Trump

== Structure ==
This office can trace its roots back to the early days of the modern national security establishment. It was created in 1949, two years after the National Security Act established the Department of Defense.

The ASD (ISA) is supported by seven deputy assistant secretaries (DASDs), each with coverage of a different region or international organization. The DASDs manage "principal directors" who in turn oversee "country directors" with more narrow geographic portfolios:

- Deputy Assistant Secretary of Defense for African Affairs
- Deputy Assistant Secretary of Defense for Europe and NATO
- Deputy Assistant Secretary of Defense for Near East and Central Asia
- Deputy Assistant Secretary of Defense for Russia, Ukraine, & Eurasia
- Deputy Assistant Secretary of Defense for Western Hemisphere
- Secretary of Defense Representative in the U.S. Mission to NATO
- Secretary of Defense Representative to the Organization for Security and Co-operation in Europe

DASDs are appointed by the secretary of defense. Some are appointed from civilian life, while others are career defense officials. Once at the DASD level, the latter are considered a part of the DoD Senior Executive Service.

The ASD (ISA) is also supported by a principal deputy, or PDASD, who helps manage the day-to-day operations.

=== Principal deputy assistant secretaries for international security affairs ===
Name	Tenure	ASD (ISA) served under	USD(P) served under	SecDef(s) served under	President(s) served under
Lincoln P. Bloomfield Jr.	1988–1989	Richard Armitage	vacant	Frank Carlucci	Ronald Reagan
Carl W. Ford Jr.	April 1989 – February 1993	Henry S. Rowen; James R. Lilley	Paul Wolfowitz	Dick Cheney	George H. W. Bush
Frederick C. Smith	? – ?	Charles W. Freeman, Jr. Joseph Nye; Franklin D. Kramer	Frank G. Wisner; Walter B. Slocombe	Les Aspin; William Perry; William Cohen	Bill Clinton
Peter C. W. Flory	July 2001 – August 2005	Peter Rodman	Douglas Feith	Donald Rumsfeld	George W. Bush
Mary Beth Long	August 2005 – December 2007	Peter Rodman	Eric Edelman	Donald Rumsfeld; Robert Gates	George W. Bush
Michael W. Coulter	? – 2009	Mary Beth Long	Eric Edelman	Robert Gates	George W. Bush
Joseph McMillan	May 2009 – October 2012	Alexander R. Vershbow; Derek Chollet	Michele Flournoy; James Miller	Robert M. Gates; Leon Panetta	Barack Obama
Elissa Slotkin	October 2012 – January 2015	Derek Chollet	Christine Wormuth	Ash Carter	Barack Obama
Kenneth B. Handelman	July 2015 – ?	Elissa Slotkin	Christine Wormuth; Brian P. McKeon; Theresa Whelan (acting); Robert S. Karem (acting)	Ash Carter; James Mattis	Barack Obama; Donald Trump
Kathryn L. Wheelbarger	July 2017 – July 2020	Robert S. Karem	John Rood	James Mattis; Mark Esper	Donald Trump
Michael Cutrone	September 2020 – January 2021	vacant	James H. Anderson (acting)	Mark Esper	Donald Trump
Mara Karlin	January 2021 – August 2022	Mara Karlin	Colin Kahl	Lloyd Austin	Joe Biden
Ilan Goldenberg	December 2021 – September 2022	Celeste A. Wallander	Colin Kahl	Lloyd Austin	Joe Biden
Tressa Guenov	October 2022 – January 20, 2025	Celeste A. Wallander	Colin Kahl	Lloyd Austin	Joe Biden
Julia Sokol (Acting)	October 2025 - Present	Daniel Zimmerman	Elbridge Colby	Pete Hegseth	Donald Trump

=== Deputy assistant secretaries of defense reporting to the ASD (ISA) ===
The list below details the current and former DASDs in this office.

Name	Tenure	ASD (ISA) served under	USD(P) served under	SecDef(s) served under	President(s) served under
Active offices
DASD (ISA), African Affairs
Vicki J. Huddleston	June 2009 – December 2011	Alexander Vershbow	Michèle Flournoy	Robert Gates; Leon Panetta	Barack Obama
Alan Patterson	December 2017 – October 31, 2018	Robert Karem	John Rood	James Mattis	Donald Trump
Chidi Blyden	May 2021 – present	Celeste Wallander	Colin Kahl	Lloyd Austin	Joe Biden
DASD (ISA), European & NATO Policy
Thomas Goffus	May 2017 – October 31, 2018	Robert Karem	John Rood	James Mattis	Donald Trump
Spencer Boyer	February 2021 – present	Celeste Wallander	Colin Kahl	Lloyd Austin	Joe Biden
DASD (ISA), Near East and Central Asia
Andrew Exum	2015–2016	Elissa Slotkin	Christine Wormuth; Brian P. McKeon	Ash Carter	Barack Obama
Michael Patrick Mulroy	November 2017 – December 2019	Robert Karem	John Rood	James Mattis; Mark Esper	Donald Trump
Dana Stroul	February 2021 – 2023	Celeste Wallander	Colin Kahl	Lloyd Austin	Joe Biden
Daniel Shapiro	2023 - 2024	Celeste Wallander	Colin Kahl	Lloyd Austin	Joe Biden
Michael P. DiMino IV	January 20, 2025 - Present	Daniel Zimmerman	Elbridge Colby	Pete Hegseth	Donald Trump
DASD (ISA), Russia, Ukraine & Eurasia
Evelyn Farkas	2012 – September 2015	Derek Chollet; Elissa Slotkin	James Miller; Michael D. Lumpkin; Christine Wormuth	Leon Panetta; Chuck Hagel; Ash Carter	Barack Obama
Michael Carpenter	2016–2017	Elissa Slotkin	Christine Wormuth	Ash Carter	Barack Obama
Laura K. Cooper	January 20, 2017 – present	Robert Karem; Celeste Wallander	John Rood; Colin Kahl	James Mattis; Mark Esper; Lloyd Austin	Donald Trump; Joe Biden
DASD (ISA), Western Hemisphere
Daniel P. Erikson	March 2021 – February 2024	Celeste Wallander	Colin Kahl	Lloyd Austin	Joe Biden

== See also ==
- Under Secretary of Defense for Policy
- Assistant Secretary of Defense for Global Strategic Affairs
- Assistant Secretary of Defense for Asian and Pacific Security Affairs
- Assistant Secretary of Defense for Homeland Defense and Americas' Security Affairs
