= Alexander Vershbow =

American diplomat (born 1952)

Sandy Vershbow
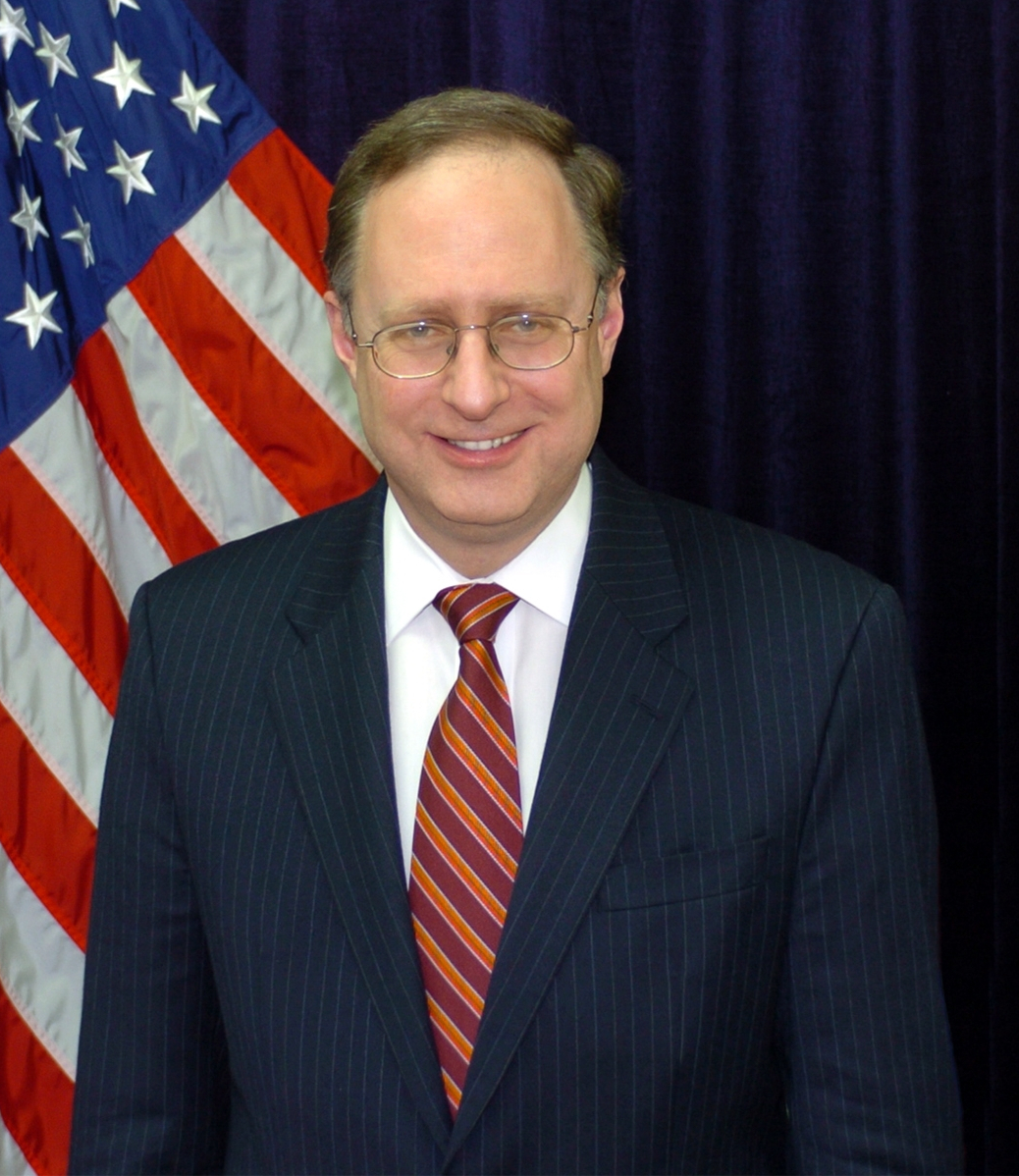
- Vershbow in 2006

Deputy Secretary General of NATO
- In office February 2012 – October 17, 2016
- Preceded by: Claudio Bisogniero
- Succeeded by: Rose Gottemoeller

Assistant Secretary of Defense for International Security Affairs
- In office April 3, 2009 – February 10, 2012
- President: Barack Obama
- Preceded by: Mary Beth Long
- Succeeded by: Derek Chollet

United States Ambassador to South Korea
- In office October 17, 2005 – September 18, 2008
- President: George W. Bush
- Preceded by: Christopher R. Hill
- Succeeded by: Kathleen Stephens

United States Ambassador to Russia
- In office October 17, 2001 – July 22, 2005
- President: George W. Bush
- Preceded by: James Franklin Collins
- Succeeded by: William J. Burns

18th United States Ambassador to NATO
- In office November 10, 1997 – July 9, 2001
- President: Bill Clinton; George W. Bush
- Preceded by: Robert E. Hunter
- Succeeded by: R. Nicholas Burns

Personal details
- Born: Alexander Russell Vershbow; July 3, 1952 (age 74) Boston, Massachusetts, U.S.
- Spouse: Lisa Vershbow
- Children: 2
- Education: Yale University (BA); Columbia University (MA)
- Awards: Order of Merit of the Republic of Poland

Alexander Russell "Sandy" Vershbow (born July 3, 1952) is an American diplomat and former Deputy Secretary General of the North Atlantic Treaty Organization.

From October 2005 to October 2008, he was the United States Ambassador to South Korea. Before that post he had been the ambassador to the Russian Federation from 2001 to 2005 and the ambassador to NATO from 1997 to 2001. For his work with NATO he was awarded the State Department's Distinguished Service Award.

In March 2009, President Barack Obama nominated Vershbow as Assistant Secretary of Defense for International Security Affairs, a position that holds responsibility for U.S. policy toward NATO, coordination of U.S. security and defense policies relating to the nations and international organizations of Europe, the Middle East and Africa. He was confirmed in April 2009.

After almost three years with the U.S. Department of Defense, in February 2012, Vershbow moved back to Brussels where he took the position of Deputy Secretary General of NATO, becoming the first American to hold the position.

== Early life and education ==
Vershbow was born in Boston, Massachusetts, to Arthur Vershbow and Charlotte Vershbow (née Zimmerman), both were of German-Jewish descent.

Vershbow attended the Buckingham Browne & Nichols School before moving on to Yale College, from which he graduated in 1974 in Russian and East European Studies. He earned an MA at Columbia University in 1976 in International Relations and Certificate of the Russian Institute. He learned to play the drums at a young age and kept up his passion abroad including occasionally playing in bands with other Ambassadors while on foreign assignments.

== Career ==
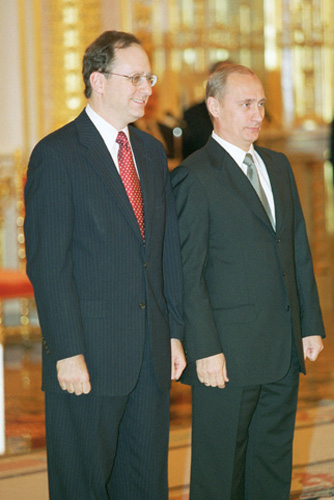
Then-Ambassador Vershbow with Russian President Vladimir Putin in October 2001

=== National Security Council ===
Vershbow was Special Assistant to the President and Senior Director for European Affairs at the National Security Council (1994–97). He was the first recipient of the Department of Defense's Joseph J. Kruzel Award for his contributions to peace in the former Yugoslavia (1997).

=== Ambassador to Russia ===
Vershbow was US ambassador to Russia from 2001 to 2005. He is famous for ignoring the official ceremony of giving his letter of credence to Russian President Vladimir Putin, for which the reason of "a planned vacation" was given.

=== Ambassador to South Korea ===
Early in his tenure as ambassador to South Korea he generated controversy by continuing the hard line on North Korea begun by his predecessor Christopher R. Hill. He pressed North Korea on the issues of human rights and superdollars, calling the government a "criminal regime", and called on them to return to the Six-Party Talks. One South Korean lawmaker even tried to have him expelled from the country. In January 2006 his attempt to meet with the Korea Internet Journalists' Association, which describes itself as 'progressive', was blocked by protestors from the Korean Confederation of Trade Unions.

Together with Hill, who was the Assistant Secretary of State, Vershbow also pioneered a strategy of speaking directly to the Korean people through the internet and by actually appearing and speaking at street rallies.

Vershbow spoke out in favor of the expansion of the U.S. base at Pyeongtaek. Some local residents demonstrated against the expansion; Vershbow asserted that they were "out of step" with the sentiments of most residents of the area.

=== Assistant Secretary of Defense for International Security Affairs ===
Vershbow was Assistant Secretary of Defense for International Security Affairs (ISA). In a July 2010 organization chart he was shown as five ASD's serving under Under Secretary of Defense for Policy Michèle Flournoy, with the other four being Wallace Gregson, Paul Stockton, Michael Nacht, and Michael G. Vickers.

Vershbow was leading sessions for the chief of staff of Egypt's armed forces, Lt. Gen. Sami Hafez Enan, and a delegation in Washington in January 2011, when the visit was truncated due to concurrent Egyptian protests.

=== NATO Deputy Secretary General ===
Vershbow was the Deputy Secretary General of NATO from February 2012 to October 2016 after serving for three years in the Pentagon as the U.S. Assistant Secretary of Defense for International Security Affairs. While in Brussels, Vershbow argued that partnerships are "a necessity, not a luxury" stressing that NATO's partnerships have helped to consolidate peace and stability in Europe, and to extend stability beyond the Alliance's borders. In remarks to a small groups of reporters on May 2, 2014, reported by AP, Vershbow said that after two decades of trying to build a partnership with Russia, NATO now feels compelled to start treating Moscow as an adversary. "Clearly the Russians have declared NATO as an adversary, so we have to begin to view Russia no longer as a partner but as more of an adversary than a partner," he said, adding that Russia's annexation of Crimea and its apparent manipulation of unrest in eastern Ukraine have fundamentally changed the NATO-Russia relationship. Near the end of his tenure Vershbow was awarded the 'Grand Cross of the Order of the Crown' in recognition of his years of distinguished service for the Alliance.

=== Atlantic Council ===
Following his career in public service, Vershbow joined the Atlantic Council as Distinguished Fellow, Brent Scowcroft Center on International Security. He has become a frequent media commentator on national security affairs and predicted the Russian government would not respond militarily to the Trump administration's bombing of Syria in response to the Asad regime's use of chemical weapons in 2017.

=== Rasmussen Global ===
Vershbow also acts as a senior advisor to Anders Fogh Rasmussen's political consultancy firm Rasmussen Global where he offers advice on transatlantic relations and foreign policy.

== Personal life ==
Vershbow's wife, Lisa Vershbow, is a designer of contemporary jewelry. They have two sons together.

Vershow has been part of charity appearances with the band Coalition of the Willing which was composed of several U.S. Government officials, including 71st U.S Secretary of State Antony Blinken, former Hungarian Ambassador to NATO and the U.S. Andras Simonyi, diplomat and national security policymaker Lincoln P. Bloomfield Jr., former Deputy Secretary for Department of Energy Daniel Poneman, and guitarist Jeff "Skunk" Baxter of Steely Dan and The Doobie Brothers.

== Honours ==
- Poland: Grand Cross of the Order of Merit of the Republic of Poland (2016)
- Georgia: Order of the Golden Fleece (2016)
- Belgium: Knight Grand Cross in the Order of the Crown, 2016.

Diplomatic posts
Preceded by Robert E. Hunter	United States Ambassador to NATO; 1997–2001	Succeeded by R. Nicholas Burns
Preceded by James Franklin Collins	United States Ambassador to Russia; 2001–2005	Succeeded by William J. Burns
Preceded by Christopher R. Hill	United States Ambassador to South Korea; 2005–2008	Succeeded by Kathleen Stephens
Political offices
Preceded by Mary Beth Long	Assistant Secretary of Defense for International Security Affairs; 2009–2012	Succeeded by Derek Chollet
