= Laura Cooper =

American civil servant

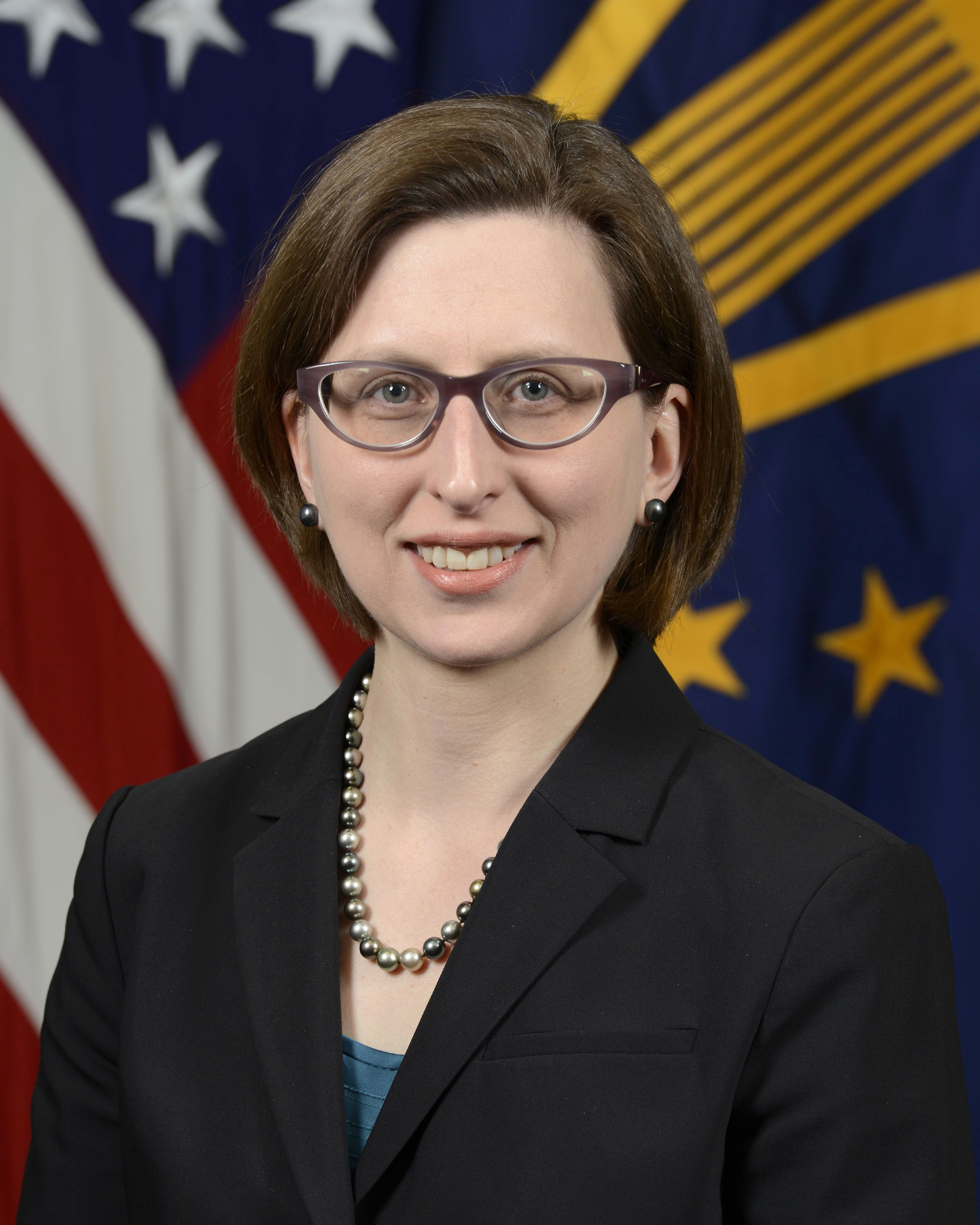

Assistant Secretary of Defense for International Security Affairs
- Acting
- In office January 20, 2021 – December 17, 2021
- President: Joe Biden
- Preceded by: Michael Cutrone (Acting)
- Succeeded by: Celeste A. Wallander

Deputy Assistant Secretary of Defense for Russia, Ukraine, Eurasia
- In office January 20, 2017 – January 8, 2025
- President: Donald Trump; Joe Biden
- Preceded by: Evelyn Farkas

Personal details
- Born: St. Louis, Missouri, U.S.
- Education: Northwestern University (BA); Georgetown University (MS); National Defense University (MS)

Laura Katherine Cooper is an American civil servant. Ms. Cooper is the 2023 Federal Employee of the Year (Samuel J. Heyman Service to America Medals), awarded by the nonprofit, nonpartisan Partnership for Public Service to celebrate excellence in the U.S. federal civil service. She is Deputy Assistant Secretary of Defense for Russian, Ukrainian, and Eurasian affairs in the office of the Under Secretary of Defense for Policy, and a career member of the Senior Executive Service (SES). In 2023, she was honored with the Presidential Rank Distinguished Executive Award, the highest annual award for career SES members. She previously served as principal director in the office of the Homeland Defense and Global Security Affairs.

Cooper testified to the United States Congress's House Intelligence Committee during a closed-door hearing on October 23, 2019; this committee gathered information relevant to impeachment proceedings involving U.S. President Donald Trump. She also testified on November 20, 2019, in an open hearing to that same committee.

== Education ==
Cooper is a 1992 graduate of Cor Jesu Academy high school and attended St. Margaret Mary Alacoque school in south St. Louis County, Missouri. Cooper attended Northwestern University, receiving a Bachelor of Arts. She received a master's degree from Georgetown University in Foreign Service, and a Master of Science in National Resource Strategy from the National Defense University.

== Career ==
Before joining the Department of Defense (DOD) in 2001, she had been a policy planning officer for the State Department and a Junior Fellow at the Carnegie Endowment for International Peace.

A prior assignment in the DOD had been as Afghanistan Team Chief, Stability Operations Office, responsible for stability and security. In 2004 she presciently noted that to achieve these objectives, the efforts had to be enduring, with no end in sight. She identified the major needs to reach these goals: the Ministry of Defense and the Afghan National Army needed to be reformed and rebuilt to counter the resurgent Taliban and the powerful warlords; a police force was needed to combat crime; the justice system had to be assisted to ensure the rule of law; prisons had to be built.

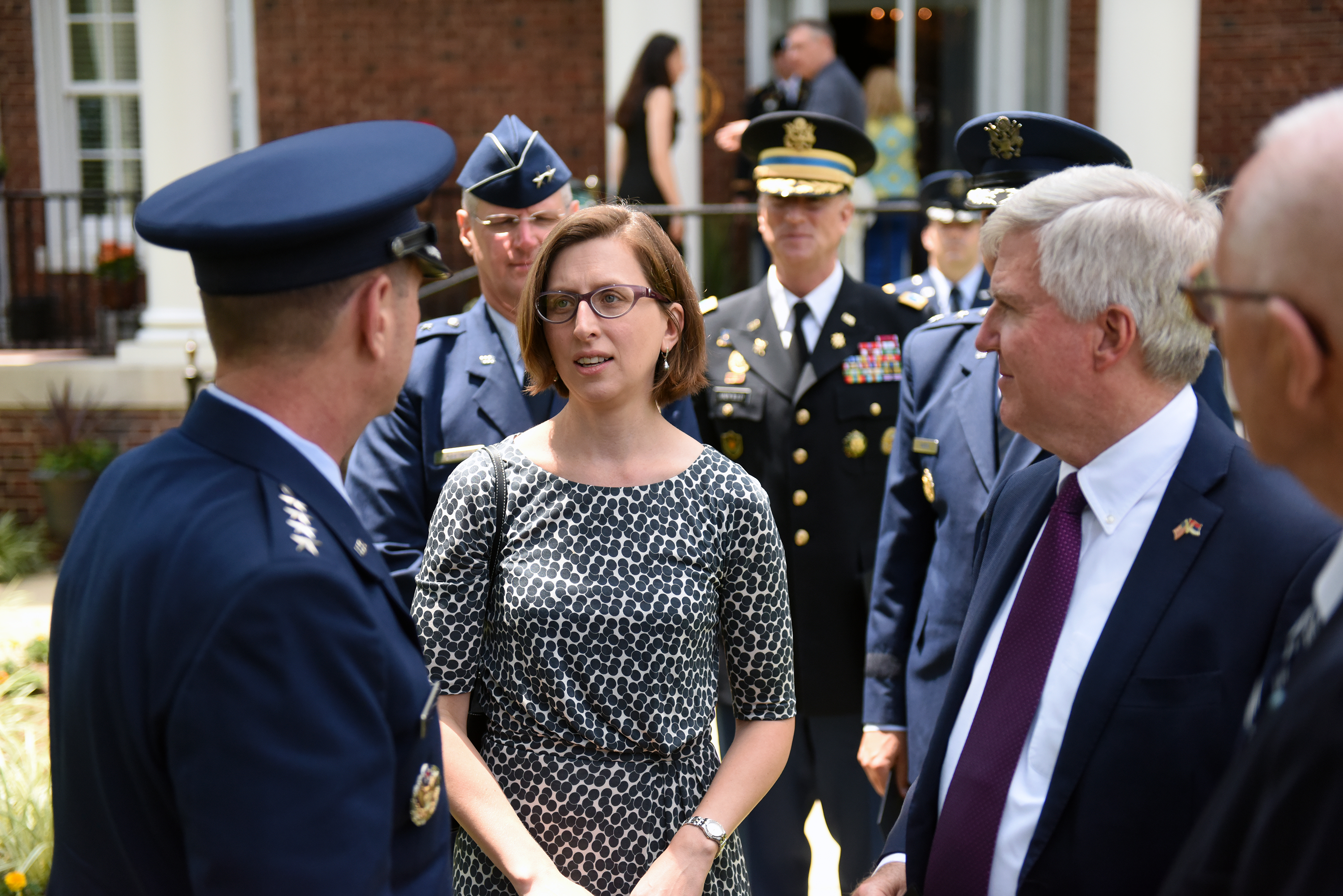
Laura Cooper, and Ambassador Kyle Scott, ambassador to Serbia, right, after a reception in honor of H Aleksandar Vučić, president, Republic of Serbia, Washington, D.C., July 16, 2017.

Described as a "senior U.S. Department of Defense official", Cooper has been involved in multiple U.S.–Eurasian defense negotiations.

She has described the Russian intervention in Ukraine as "a brazen violation of international law" after Ukrainian vessels were attacked by Russia in late November 2018. Cooper has been supportive of continued military aid to Ukraine. During a 2018 visit to Ukraine, she noted that Congress had authorized money for military aid, and she said that "one of my goals on this visit was to discuss with the Government of Ukraine what its priority needs are for security assistance." She met with Ukrainian Minister of Defence Stepan Poltorak to define measures of bilateral cooperation for defense. Cooper was the Pentagon official in charge of the aid package; she confirmed in December 2018 that the U.S. would have a comprehensive response to Russian aggression. In a video message Cooper said that Ukraine "can count on the U.S. to remain your strong partner" in strengthening its military. There is consensus that her assurances to the Ukrainians demonstrated that she expected the funds to be released in early 2019.

External videos
- Testimony of Cooper and David Hale to the House Intelligence Committee, November 20, 2019, C-SPAN

Her testimony was sought by the Congressional committees leading the impeachment inquiry against Donald Trump in matters relating to the Trump–Ukraine scandal. On October 23, 2019, in defiance to a White House letter warning her not to appear before the impeachment inquiry, Cooper testified in a closed-door deposition before congressional committees. After a five-hour delay due to a protest by Republican members of Congress, Cooper completed a 3.5-hour deposition in which she explained the process for transferring military aid to Ukraine. During a public hearing on November 20, 2019, Cooper testified to the U.S House of Representatives that Ukrainian officials knew about the hold on military aid by July 25, the day of the Trump–Zelenskyy call, undercutting an assertion that there could not have been a quid pro quo because Ukraine was not aware of the hold.

== Awards ==
- Federal Employee of the Year (Samuel J. Heyman Service to America Medals), awarded by the nonprofit, nonpartisan Partnership for Public Service to celebrate excellence in the U.S. federal civil service.
- Presidential Rank Distinguished Executive Award, the highest annual award for career SES members.
- Order of Princess Olga presented by Ukrainian President Volodymyr Zelenskyy.
- Banned from Travel to Russia by the Russian Foreign Ministry
- Department of Defense Distinguished Civilian Service Award (Bronze Palm)
- Department of Defense Distinguished Civilian Service Award
- Secretary of Defense Exceptional Civilian Service Award (Bronze Palm)
- Secretary of Defense Exceptional Civilian Service Award
