= Mary Beth Long =

American diplomat, and entrepreneur (born 1963)

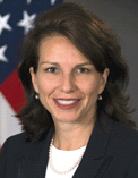

Assistant Secretary of Defense for International Security Affairs
- In office December 20, 2007 – January 20, 2009
- President: George W. Bush
- Preceded by: Peter Rodman
- Succeeded by: Alexander Vershbow

Personal details
- Born: August 20, 1963 (age 63) Clearfield, Pennsylvania, U.S.
- Party: Republican
- Education: Pennsylvania State University (BA); Washington and Lee University School of Law (JD)

Mary Beth Long (born August 20, 1963) is an American foreign policy expert, entrepreneur, and former U.S. government official. From 2007 to 2009, Long served as the first woman confirmed by the U.S. Senate as an Assistant Secretary of Defense, the first female civilian four-star military equivalent in the history of the Pentagon. She led the International Security Affairs (ISA) office in the Office of the Secretary of Defense responsible for policy for the Middle East, Europe, and Africa. She was also the first woman ever to be appointed as Chair of NATO's High Level Group (HLG), the highest-level responsible for NATO's nuclear policy and reporting directly to the Secretary General of NATO.

In 2016, the media identified Long as Secretary of Defense James Mattis' first choice for the position as Undersecretary of Policy in the Office of the Secretary of Defense. Long, who signed an open letter concerning President Trump's candidacy, did not receive the appointment despite disavowing the open letter during a November 2016 interview claiming Trump's foreign policy had become more "nuanced".

Beginning Academic Year 2021, Long was appointed as a professor of practice at the Penn State School of International Affairs (SIA) teaching graduate courses on National Intelligence, Foreign Affairs, and Globalization.

Long is the owner of law firm MB Long & Associates PLLC, which specializes in export compliance and defense. She is the Founder and Principal of Global Alliance Advisors and owner of Askari Defense and Intelligence, LLC. She founded her first defense company, Metis Solutions LLC, in 2010 and sold it to private equity in 2016, retaining a minority share. The company was again sold to PAE in 2020.

== Early life and education ==
Long is a Clearfield, Pennsylvania native and the first person in her family to attend university. She is a 1985 Honors Program Graduate, magna cum laude, of Penn State University with a bachelor's degree in communications studies and was inducted into Phi Beta Kappa while at Penn State. She attended the Taiwan National University and the Fu Ren Catholic University in Taiwan, extending her stay to travel and study Chinese language and culture on the Mainland.

In 1998, Long graduated cum laude with her J.D. from Washington and Lee University School of Law.

== Career ==
=== Central Intelligence Agency ===
Long served as an Operations Officer for the Central Intelligence Agency from 1986 to 1999. She was one of six women to be the first included in the Agency's Clandestine Operations in Dangerous Areas advanced weapons course (CODA) and received several Superior Performance Awards, including in Covert Action. She served as deputy and acting chief for the Haiti Task Force and was co-chair of a joint CIA-Drug Enforcement Administration counternarcotics targeting team.

=== Legal career ===
After leaving the CIA, Long was an associate at Williams & Connolly Law Firm from 1999 to 2004, where she specialized in civil litigation.

=== Department of Defense ===
Long began her career at the Department of Defense in May 2004 as the Deputy Assistant Secretary of Defense for Counter Narcoterrorism (DASD-CN) with a budget of over $1 billion and served in that role until August 2006, including one year while dual-hatted in her international security affairs role. She spent considerable time in Afghanistan and was the architect of the counter narcotic police and other training. In August 2005, she became the Principal Deputy Assistant Secretary of Defense for International Security Affairs. From 2006 to 2007, she was dual-hatted as the Principal Deputy Assistant Secretary of Defense and DASD Counternarcotics, adding policy oversight of the Western Hemisphere, Asia, South East Asia, Africa and the Middle East to her portfolio.

In 2007 she was appointed as the acting assistant Secretary of Defense (ASD) and added Europe, NATO, and Russia to her portfolio. In December 2007, Long became the first woman to be confirmed by the Senate as an Assistant Secretary of Defense.

In her capacity as ASD, Long represented OSD Policy at the National Security Council at the NSC Deputies' Meetings and also provided Congressional testimony on a variety of matters.

That same year, Long became the first woman appointed as the Chairman of the High Level Group responsible for NATO's nuclear policy, reporting to the Secretary General of NATO.

=== Post-Government ===
After departing the Pentagon, Long remains active in foreign policy, security, and intelligence issues as a frequent speaker and advisor. Since 2010, she has owned and operated a daily security digest and information service in English and Arabic providing defense-related news and analysis to select clients and is a frequent participant in private discussions with foreign national leadership from the Middle East, Turkey, Russia, China, India, Europe, and Latin America on defense strategy, capability building, and intelligence matters. Ms. Long has presided over Council of Foreign Relations discussions on various topics, including Ukraine, intelligence matters, and U.S. Industrial Base Preparedness. She was a member of the organization's committee on Washington programming in 2023.

Long is also frequently a panelist at think tanks both in the U.S. and abroad on a variety of issues, such as the Future of Military Targeting, The Future of Defense Security Cooperation in the Middle East, the Use of Drones, Women in National Security and Emerging Technology in Warfare. She appears on Voice of America on current affairs as well as Korea-North Korea-China issues. In 2022, Ms. Long worked with several organizations to facilitate the departure of American citizens and retrieve former Afghan military and intelligence colleagues from Afghanistan.

In 2021, Long joined Penn State School of International Affairs (SIA) faculty as a professor of practice for the 2021–22 academic year where she taught graduate classes in foreign affairs, intelligence and globalization. She has served on the university's Provost's Global Advisory Council since 2017.

From 2013 to 2016, Long served as a Senior Subject Matter Expert for the Supreme Allied Commander of NATO and as a Senior International Advisor to the Minister of Defense of Colombia. Long also provided testimony to the U.S. Senate Committee on Foreign Relations and the House Foreign Affairs Sub-Committee on the Western Hemisphere. Long was a senior advisor to the Mitt Romney presidential campaign in 2012, and was quoted as an expert on issues of national security and foreign policy during the 2016 election campaign.

In 2010, Long founded M B Long & Associates PLLC, a law firm specializing in international compliance and defense sales. In 2010, she joined NeuralIQ Government Services, Inc as Executive Vice President. She also co-founded Askari Defense and Intelligence, LLC, which led a defense delegation consisting of major U.S. defense corporations to Libya in 2013. In 2010, Long also founded Metis Solutions, a government contracting company, which she sold in 2016. In 2017, Long co-founded the consulting firm Global Alliance Advisors (GAA) with partner Richard Kirkland; and Charles Thomas Burbage, Jeffrey Kohler, Vice Admiral John W. Miller, and Admiral William J. Fallon joined shortly thereafter.

== Affiliations ==
Long is a member of the Board of Directors of AeroEnvironment, LLC. On the charity front, she is a member of the Board of Directors of the International Spy Museum and the Board of Advisors of America Abroad Media. She is "of counsel" at the law firm of Fluet Huber + Hoang PLLC (FH+H).

On policy and international affairs, Long is a member of the Vandenberg Coalition, the American Security Project, and is a Cipher Brief expert. Long is also a lifetime member of the Council on Foreign Relations and a member of the International Institute for Strategic Studies (IISS). She is a member of the U.S.-UAE Business Council and serves as an advisor to a number of businesses, including GlobalEyes, and MAG Aerospace.

Long has served as a member of the Advisory Committee on Voluntary Foreign Aid appointed by the Director of USAID. She also was involved in CSIS's Task Force on Global Forced Migration, the Bi-partisan Policy Center's Syria and Middle East Project, the Council on Foreign Relations North Korea "Sharper Choice" report, the Harvard-sponsored, Belfer Center U.S.-Israel Track II Iran negotiations, and Common Ground's U.S-Russia-Turkey talks.

In 2017 Long was appointed to the Penn State Provost Global Board of Advisors. In 2010, Long joined the External Advisory Board of the Penn State School of International Affairs. From 2006 to 2007, Long served on Penn State University's Schreyer's External Advisory Board.

Long has contributed as a panelist for a number of international discussions, including for the McCain Institute, Chatham House, the Jewish Institute for National Security and America, the Atlantic Council, the Journal of International Security Affairs, Intelligence Squared, the University of Texas at San Antonio, Institute for Policy and Strategy, SETA Foundation, Hudson Institute, Gulf International Forum, Multinational Development Policy Dialogue, 'Spies, Lies & Nukes', Sedona Forum, the German Marshal Fund, Center for Strategic and International Studies, the University of California Irvine, Defense One, Breaking Defense, Foundation for the Defense of Democracies, Middle East Policy Council, the Institute for National Security Studies, the Italian Institute for International Political Studies, Middle East Institute, Council on Foreign Relations, Noticias Uno Colombia, the Turkish Heritage Organization, and the Herzilya Annual Conference. Long has spoken at the International Spy Museum, the Women's Foreign Policy Group, Colorado Bar Association Conference, USC US-China Institute, Clements Center for National Security, Penn State, the Institute for Policy and Strategy, and Schreyer Honors College.

Long has written for major publications including The American Interest, Al Monitor, American Greatness, Real Clear Defense, The Hill, The National Interest, Haaretz, Foreign Policy, Middle East Policy, and PRISM, among others. Long has appeared on and been quoted by a number of global publications and media outlets such as NPR, CNBC, CNN, Fox News, the Wall Street Journal, BBC, and CSP. Long's additional appearances include the Capitol, Channel 4 News, i24News English, NTD News, the IDC International Radio, Kurdistan 24, and Al Jazeera. She has also been quoted by the Jerusalem Post and Intelligence Online.

Long also has appeared on podcasts including KCRW, Horns of a Dilemma, Life, Deconstructed, CNBC The News with Shepard Smith, Salem Podcast Network, and the Rick Ungar Show Highlight Podcast.

== Honors and awards ==
In June 2017, Long received the Distinguished Alumni Award from Penn State University, the university's highest honor presented to its alumni.

In June 2016 she was featured in Forbes magazine's Women Business Leaders.

In 2010, Long was the 15th speaker in the annual Mark Luchinisky Memorial Lecture series at Penn State University.

Long received both the Department of Defense Medal for Distinguished Public Service and the Chairman of the Joint Chiefs of Staff Distinguished Civilian Service Award in 2009.

In 2008, the Penn State Alumni Association named Long as an Alumni Fellow. Schreyer Honors College recognized her as an Outstanding Alumni Scholar in 2006.

While at DoD, Long received a number of additional awards, including the National Guard Patriot Award. At CIA Long also received various Superior and Outstanding Performance Awards from 1987 to 1999.

== Publications ==
- Long, Mary Beth (December 17, 2021). "UAE suspension of weapons purchase meant to send a message to Washington". The Hill.
- Long, Mary Beth; Przyborowski, Emily; Gerry, Kathryn (15 November 2021). "How Ankara-Abu Dhabi detente could affect Libya". Al Monitor.
- Long, Mary Beth (2 August 2021). "Chaos and Confusion in Kabul". Al Monitor.
- Long, Mary Beth; Przyborowski, Emily (5 February 2021). "US may help keep GCC reconciliation on track". Al Monitor.
- Long, Mary Beth; Ledeen, Simone (25 April 2021). "How America Can Advance Egyptian Human Rights". The National Interest.
- Long, Mary Beth (8 June 2020). "We must constrain Iran's access to weapons — especially as it steps up cyberattacks". The Hill.
- Long, Mary Beth (11 September 2019). "We cannot forget, or go soft — terrorists remain bent on US destruction". The Hill.
- Long, Mary Beth; Neubauer, Sigurd (17 May 2019). "Gulf States Are Sabotaging Trump's Campaign Against Iran - and Their Own Security". Haaretz.
- Long, Mary Beth; Chollet, Derek; Sullivan, Jake; Simes, Dimitri (19 March 2017). "U.S. Commitments in the Middle East: Advice to the Trump Administration". Middle East Policy. 24 (1): 5–34. doi:10.1111/mepo.12248. S2CID 157147219.
- Long, Mary Beth (9 May 2016). "G.I. Who?". The American Interest.
- Long, Mary Beth; Waltz, Michael (2 August 2013). "Al-Qaeda's new strategy: jailbreaks". Foreign Policy.
- Long, Mary Beth; Aaronson, Michael; Diessen, Sverre; Kermabon, Yves de; Miklaucic, Michael (September 2011). "NATO Countering the Hybrid Threat". PRISM. 2 (4): 111–124. JSTOR 26469152.
