= James Franklin Collins =

American diplomat

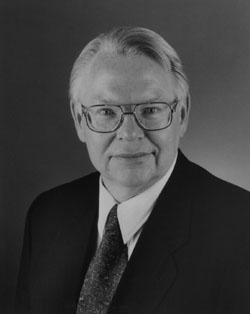

United States Ambassador to Russia
- In office January 26, 1998 – July 10, 2001
- President: Bill Clinton; George W. Bush
- Preceded by: Thomas R. Pickering
- Succeeded by: Alexander R. Vershbow

Personal details
- Born: June 4, 1939 (age 87) Aurora, Illinois, U.S.
- Education: Harvard College; Indiana University Bloomington

James Franklin Collins (born June 4, 1939) is a former United States Ambassador to Russia. A career Foreign Service Officer in the State Department, he is a Russian specialist.

== Biography ==
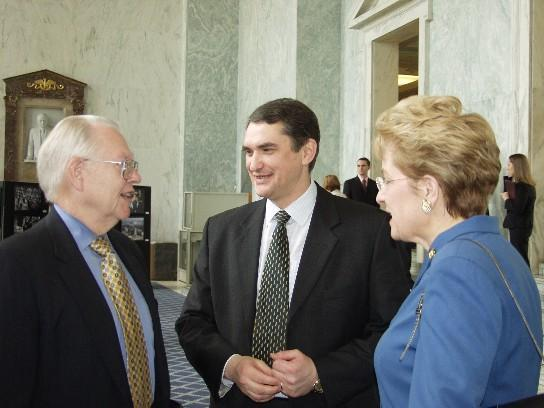
Collins with Marcy Kaptur and Oleh Shamshur in 2006

Collins graduated from Harvard College cum laude in 1961 and earned a master's degree in history and Certificate from the Russian and East European Institute from Indiana University Bloomington in 1964. He studied at Moscow State University and conducted archival research during 1965–66 as an exchange student in the history faculty and conducted research at the British Museum in 1966 as an Indiana University fellow. He became a professor at the United States Naval Academy in 1967, where he taught Russian and European history, American government and economics.

After joining the Foreign Service in 1969, he served at the consulate general in İzmir, Turkey, 1969 to 1971. He was appointed as second secretary at the American embassy Moscow 1973–75, and political counselor at the American embassy in Amman, Jordan 1982 to 1984.

At the State Department in Washington he held positions of deputy executive secretary for Europe and Latin America; director of the Department of State's Operations Center; and policy positions in the Bureaus of European and Canadian Affairs, Near East and South Asian Affairs, and Intelligence and Research. In the years 1987 to 1988, he served as a staff member of the National Security Council as director for Intelligence Policy.

He was assigned to Moscow as deputy chief of mission in 1990 and served in that capacity with three ambassadors, Jack F. Matlock, Robert S. Strauss and Thomas R. Pickering. When Matlock retired in the summer of 1991, Collins became chargé d'affaires and was acting ambassador during the 1991 Soviet coup d'état attempt that led to the breakup of the Soviet Union. He similarly was Chargé d'affaires when President Gorbachev signed the decree formally ending the existence of the USSR. Following his return to Washington in 1993, he then served as senior coordinator and ambassador at large and special advisor to the secretary of state for the New Independent States, before being named ambassador to Russia by President Bill Clinton in 1997.

As ambassador from 1997 to 2001, Collins's tenure played a role in critical moments in the development of Russian relations with the United States. In addition to several summits between President Clinton and President Boris Yeltsin, and the transition of power from President Yeltsin to Vladimir Putin on New Year's Day 2000., his tenure as ambassador was marked by the economic collapse following Russia's default in 1998 and the Kosovo crisis of 1998–1999.

After a career in the Foreign Service, he has been active in the non-profit world and has served as a senior advisor at the law firm Akin Gump Strauss Hauer & Feld.

In January 2007 he was appointed the director of the Russian and Eurasian Program at the Carnegie Endowment for International Peace.

He is married to Dr. Naomi F. Collins and they have two sons, Robert and Jonathan.

== Honorary degrees ==
- Indiana University
- University of Maryland University College
- The Russian Academy of Sciences
- Nizhniy Novgorod State Linguistics University
- Moscow State University (honorary Professor)

== Awards ==
- Secretary of State's Award for Distinguished Service
- Department of State's Distinguished Honor Award
- Secretary of State's Award for Career Achievement
- Department of Defense Medal for Distinguished Public Service
- NASA Medal for Distinguished Service

== Non-profit board memberships ==
He has served as a board member or advisor to the

- U.S.-Russia Business Council
- American Academy of Diplomacy
- Open World Leadership Center
- American Councils for International Education
- CRDF Global
- Library of Foreign Literature in Moscow.

== Notes ==
Diplomatic posts
Preceded by Thomas R. Pickering	United States Ambassador to Russia; 1997-2001	Succeeded by Alexander Vershbow
