= Kathryn L. Wheelbarger =

American lawyer (born 1977)

Katie Wheelbarger
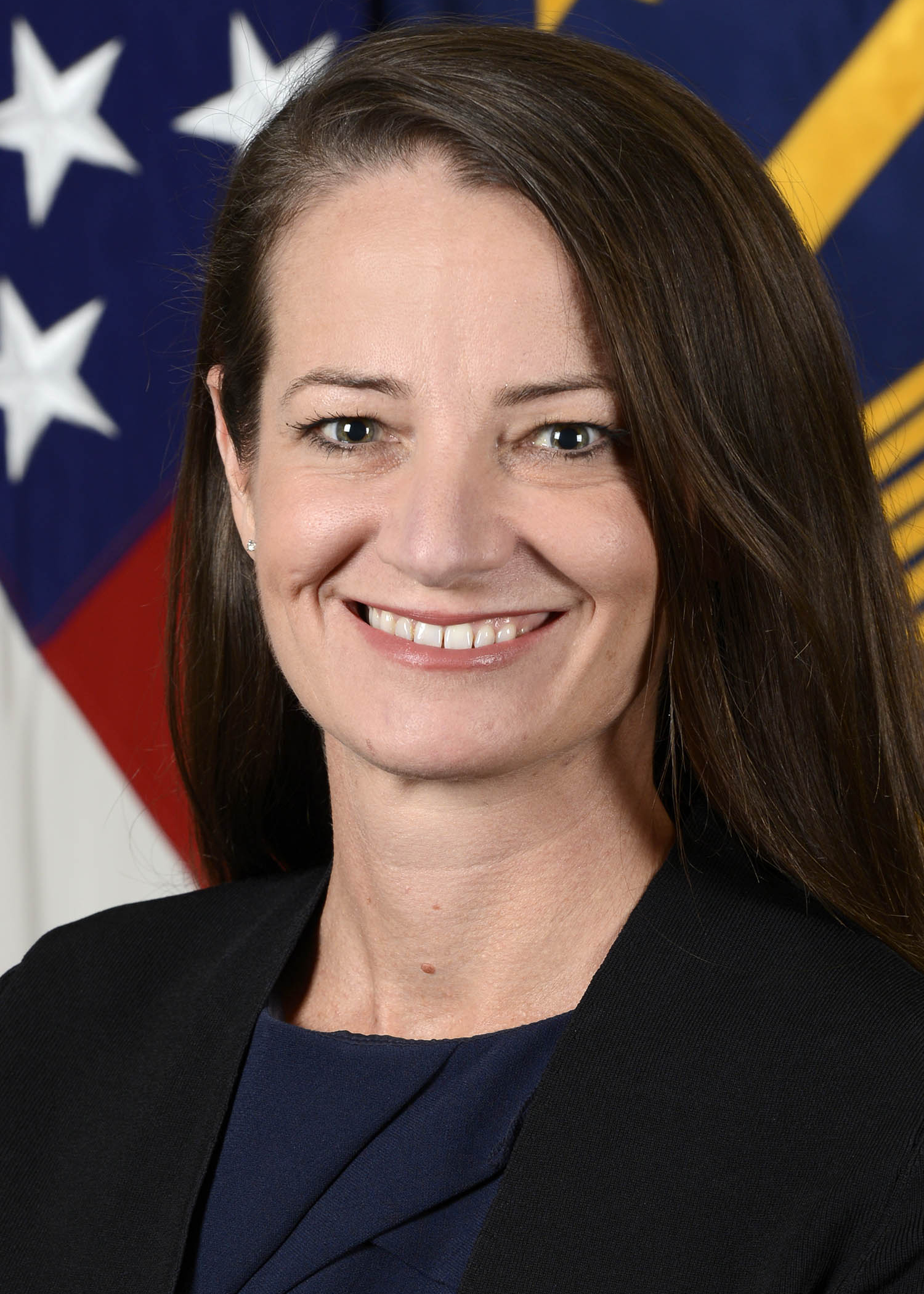

Acting Assistant Secretary of Defense for International Security Affairs
- In office October 31, 2018 – July 4, 2020
- President: Donald Trump
- Preceded by: Robert Karem
- Succeeded by: Michael C. Ryan (acting)
- In office June 7, 2017 – October 27, 2017
- President: Donald Trump
- Preceded by: Robert Karem
- Succeeded by: Robert Karem

Personal details
- Born: 1977 (age 48–49) California, U.S.
- Party: Republican
- Education: University of California, Los Angeles (BA); Harvard University (JD)

Kathryn Lynn Wheelbarger (born 1977) is an American attorney and government official, who served as Principal Deputy and Acting Assistant Secretary of Defense for International Security Affairs from 2018 to 2020.

== Early life and education ==
Wheelbarger is a native of California, and daughter of Edmund and Diane Dailey Wheelbarger. She earned a Bachelor of Arts degree in political science, graduating summa cum laude from the University of California, Los Angeles in 1999. After interning in 1997 with then-Rep. John Kasich (R-Ohio) and the Joint Economic Committee. She earned a Juris Doctor from Harvard Law School.

== Career ==
After completing law school, Wheelbarger served as a law clerk for the United States Court of Appeals for the Ninth Circuit in Boise, Idaho, and later as a litigation associate with the law firm Cooper and Kirk.

Wheelbarger moved to Washington, D.C., to work on the George W. Bush 2004 presidential campaign. After the election, she served as Counselor to Secretary Chertoff and Associate General Counsel at the Department of Homeland Security from 2005 to 2007. Wheelbarger served as counsel to Vice President Richard Cheney and general counsel to the Vice President's 80-person staff from 2007 to 2009.

From 2015 to 2017, Wheelbarger served as policy director and counsel on the United States Senate Committee on Armed Services, where she managed the committee's intelligence portfolio for Chairman John McCain. She also served from 2011 to 2015 as deputy staff director and senior counsel on the House Permanent Select Committee on Intelligence, where she was responsible for budget and policy reviews of intelligence community, led investigations, and developed policy positions for Chairman Mike Rogers. From 2009 to 2011 she served as the Deputy Staff Director for the House Energy and Commerce Committee.

Wheelbarger served as vice president for litigation and chief compliance officer at CSRA Inc. In this position, she oversaw CSRA's litigation and investigations portfolio as well as oversaw the company's Ethics and Compliance Office.

Wheelbarger served as Assistant Secretary of Defense for International Security Affairs in an acting capacity from June to October 2017. She was nominated again in October 2018.

In early-2019 Wheelbarger voiced disapproval of Turkey's plan to move forward with purchases a Russian air defense system would compromise the security of F-35 aircraft, noting that U.S. cooperation with Turkey was at risk.

=== Resignation ===
In February 2020, President Donald Trump announced his intent to nominate Wheelbarger to serve as Deputy Under Secretary of Defense for Intelligence and Security. Her nomination was never submitted to the Senate. In June 2020, President Trump instead announced his intent to nominate Bradley Hansell, who earlier served as a special assistant to Trump, for this position. On June 18, Wheelbarger submitted her resignation, effective July 4. Reuters reported Wheelbarger's letter noted she was confident her colleagues would “continue to be guided by the U.S. Constitution and the principles of our founding, which ensure both our security and our freedom.”

== See also ==
- Trump–Ukraine scandal
- Impeachment inquiry against Donald Trump
