= Kathleen Stephens =

American diplomat (born 1953)

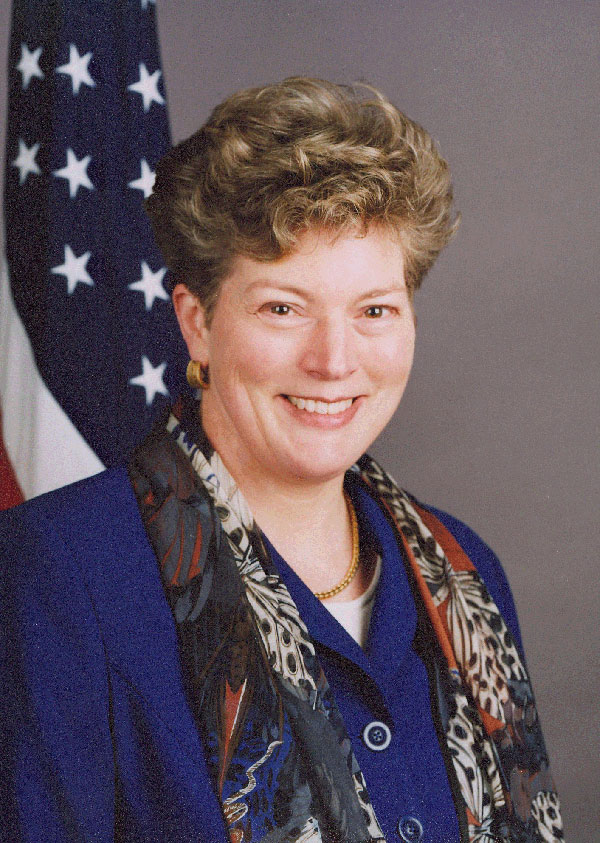

United States Chargé d'affaires to India
- In office May 22, 2014 – January 16, 2015
- President: Barack Obama
- Preceded by: Nancy Jo Powell
- Succeeded by: Richard Verma

20th United States Ambassador to South Korea
- In office October 6, 2008 – October 23, 2011
- President: George W. Bush; Barack Obama
- Preceded by: Alexander Vershbow
- Succeeded by: Sung Kim

Personal details
- Born: September 22, 1953 (age 73) Texas, United States
- Education: Prescott College (B.A.); Harvard University (M.P.A.)
- Nickname: Shim Eungyeong (심은경)

Kathleen Stephens (born September 22, 1953) is an American diplomat who served as the United States ambassador to South Korea from 2008 to 2011. She also served as the United States' chargé d'affaires to India from March to December 2014. She currently leads the Korea Economic Institute of America as president and CEO.

== Early life ==
Stephens was born in west Texas and grew up in New Mexico and Arizona. She holds a B.A. in East Asian studies from Prescott College and a master's degree from Harvard University, and also studied at the University of Hong Kong and Oxford University. After college, she was a Peace Corps volunteer in South Korea's Yesan, South Chungcheong from 1975 to 1977; it was then that she was given her Korean name Shim Eungyeong (심은경).

== Career ==
Stephens joined the United States Foreign Service in 1978. Early in her career, Stephens served at U.S. missions in Trinidad and Tobago (1978–1980) and in the People's Republic of China (1980–1982). Her tour of duty in South Korea included roles as internal political unit chief at the U.S. Embassy in Seoul (1984–1987) and Principal Officer at the U.S. Consulate in Busan (1987–1989). Afterwards, she worked as a political officer at the U.S. missions in Belgrade and Zagreb (1991–1992), senior desk officer for the United Kingdom in the Bureau of European Affairs (1992–1994), Director for European Affairs at the United States National Security Council, 1994–1995, Principal Officer at the U.S. Consulate General in Belfast, Northern Ireland, 1995–1998, Deputy Chief of Mission at the U.S. Embassy in Lisbon, Portugal, 1998–2001, and Director of the Office of Ecology and Terrestrial Conservation at the United States Department of State, 2001–2003.

Stephens assumed her duties as Deputy Assistant Secretary for European and Eurasian Affairs on December 5, 2003, during which her primary responsibility was policy oversight and management of relations with the countries of South-Central Europe. Following that, she assumed her duties as Principal Deputy Assistant Secretary of State for the Bureau of East Asian and Pacific Affairs in June 2005. In that capacity she was responsible for a variety of Bureau-wide issues, including post management. She had particular responsibility for the management of U.S. relations with Japan and Korea.

In September 2015, she was named the William J. Perry Distinguished Fellow at Stanford University's Shorenstein Asia-Pacific Research Center (APARC). She speaks several foreign languages including Korean, Serbo-Croatian, and Chinese. As of September 1, 2018 the board of directors at the Korea Economic Institute of America (KEI) announced they approved Ambassador Stephens as the next President & CEO.

=== U.S. Ambassador to South Korea ===
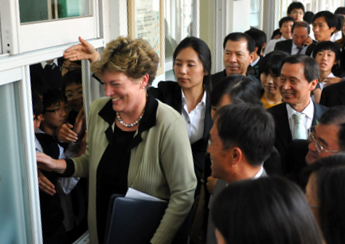
US Ambassador to South Korea Kathleen Stephens is greeted by Principal Park Jong-wan and students at Yesan Middle School where Stephens taught as a Peace Corps Volunteer 33 years before.

Stephens was nominated to be U.S. Ambassador to the Republic of Korea in 2008. On August 1, 2008, the US Senate confirmed Stephens' nomination as US ambassador to South Korea.

On October 8, 2008, Stephens presented her credentials to President Lee Myung-bak of South Korea. The Chosun Ilbo reported that Stephens spoke to Lee in fluent Korean during parts of their meeting and said she would strengthen ties between the two countries. On October 9, 2008, Stephens visited Yesan Middle School where she had taught as a Peace Corps volunteer 33 years before. "Yesan is where I learned the qualities I needed to be a diplomat," said Stephens. "I had warm-hearted colleagues who were out there for me, and students who studied hard despite many difficulties. I learned how to endure hardships and convince others, which is essential for a diplomat."

=== Awards and Recognitions ===
Stephens has been honored by the U.S. Government and numerous private organizations. Her awards include the Presidential Meritorious Service Award (2009), the Sejong Cultural Award, the Korea-America Friendship Association Award (2013), and the Kevin O'Donnell Distinguished Friends of Korea Award (2016). She is a trustee at The Asia Foundation, on the boards of the Korea Society and Pacific Century Institute, and a member of the American Academy of Diplomacy.

== Personal life ==
Stephens resides in California. She is a fluent speaker of Korean and Serbo-Croatian, and speaks Cantonese and Mandarin with limited competence.

== See also ==
- United States Ambassador to Korea

Diplomatic posts
Preceded by Alexander Vershbow	Ambassador of United States to South Korea; 2008–2011	Succeeded by Sung Kim
Government offices
Preceded by Judith McHale	Under Secretary of State for Public Diplomacy and Public Affairs; February 6, 2012 – April 4, 2012	Succeeded by Tara D. Sonenshine
