= Robert Karem =

American government official (born 1977)

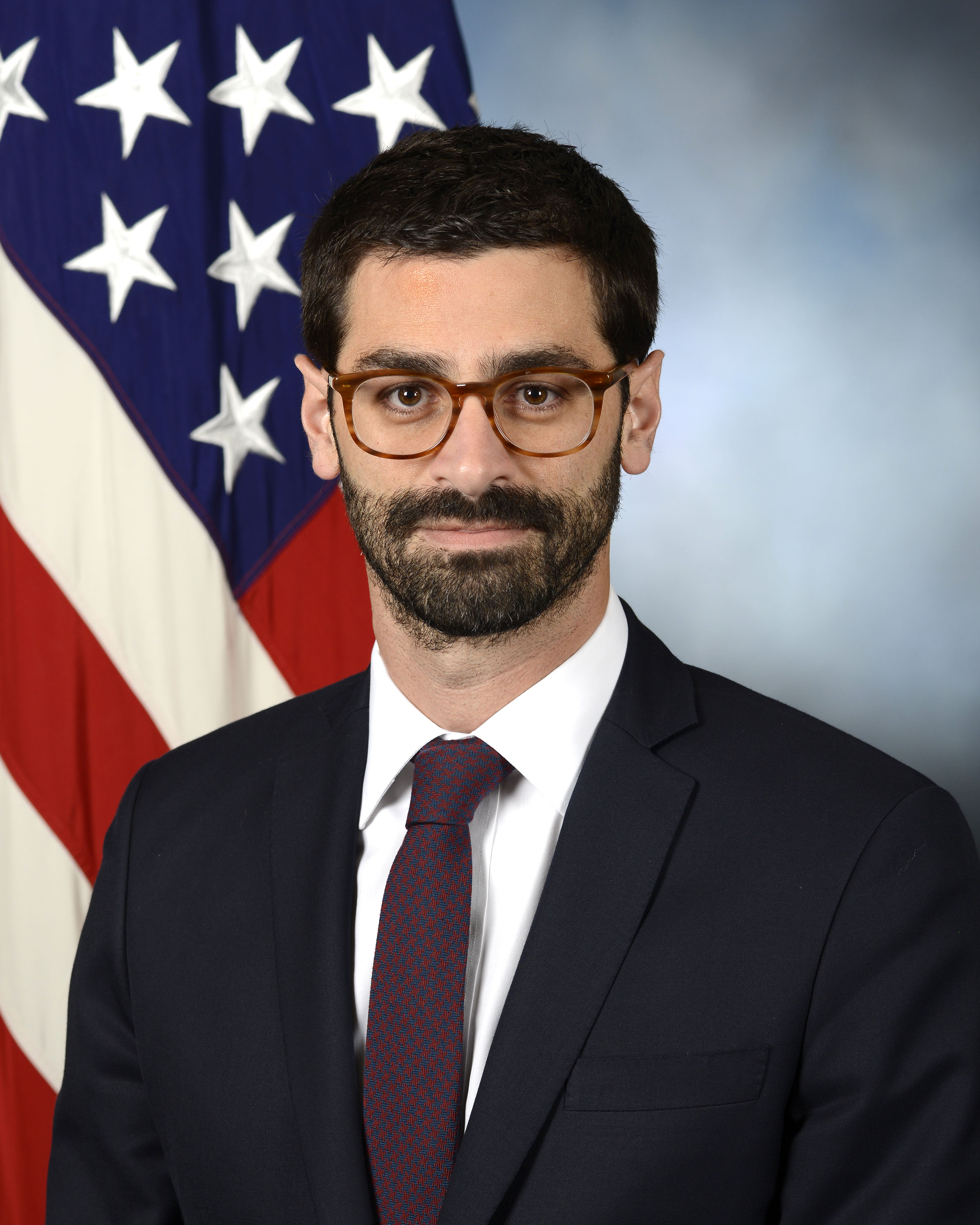

Assistant Secretary of Defense for International Security Affairs
- In office June 7, 2017 – October 31, 2018
- President: Donald Trump
- Preceded by: Derek Chollet
- Succeeded by: Celeste A. Wallander (2022)

Acting Under Secretary of Defense for Policy
- In office June 7, 2017 – October 27, 2017
- President: Donald Trump
- Preceded by: Theresa Whelan (acting)
- Succeeded by: David Trachtenberg (acting)

Personal details
- Born: Robert Story Karem; October 9, 1977 (age 49) Lexington, Kentucky, U.S.
- Party: Republican
- Education: Columbia University

Robert Story Karem (born October 9, 1977) is an American policy advisor and government official who served as Assistant Secretary of Defense for International Security Affairs in the Department of Defense.

== Early life and education ==
Karem is a native of Lexington, Kentucky, and graduated from Columbia University in 2000.

== Career ==
Karem was a foreign policy legislative assistant for U.S. Senator Mitch McConnell. He was also an advisor to former Vice President Dick Cheney, specifically with respect to Middle East affairs. Karem was a member of Cheney's national security staff from February 2005 to January 2009 and was a researcher for Cheney's memoir.

Karem later worked as an advisor to then-House Majority Leader Eric Cantor. In August 2014, Karem left Cantor's office to serve as policy advisor for U.S. House Majority Leader Kevin McCarthy.

Karem served as a member of Donald Trump's 2016 transition team as an adviser to CIA Director Mike Pompeo during Pompeo's confirmation process.

On April 25, 2017, President Trump nominated Karem to become Assistant Secretary of Defense for International Security Affairs in the Department of Defense. Derek Chollet, who served as Assistant Secretary of Defense for International Security Affairs in the Obama administration, praised Trump's decision in choosing Karem, stating that "[n]ot often [do] I say this, but terrific news from Trump Admin: Robert Karem nomn'd for Asst SecDef ISA . . . He’s smart, savvy, & skilled. Great pick!"

On May 18, 2017, Karem's confirmation hearing took place with the Senate Committee on Armed Services. He was confirmed unanimously by the U.S. Senate on May 25, 2017.

Karem stepped down as Assistant Secretary in October 2018, along with additional Pentagon officials, Thomas Goffus and Alan Patterson. He was succeeded by Kathryn L. Wheelbarger in an acting capacity.

Political offices
| Preceded by Theresa Whelan; Acting | Under Secretary of Defense for Policy; Acting; 2017 | Succeeded by David Trachtenberg; Acting |
| Preceded by Derek Chollet | Assistant Secretary of Defense for International Security Affairs; 2017-2018 | Succeeded by Kathryn L. Wheelbarger; Acting |
