= Judith McHale =

American diplomat (born 1947)

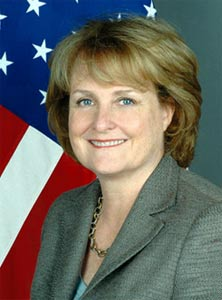

6th Under Secretary of State for Public Diplomacy and Public Affairs
- In office May 29, 2009 – July 1, 2011
- President: Barack Obama
- Preceded by: James K. Glassman
- Succeeded by: Kathleen Stephens

Personal details
- Born: 1947 (age 78–79) New York City, U.S.
- Party: Democratic
- Education: University of Nottingham (BA); Fordham University (JD)

Judith A. McHale (born 1947) is a former under secretary of state for public diplomacy and public affairs. Appointed by President Obama, she was confirmed by the U.S. Senate on May 21, 2009, and sworn in on May 26. She resigned effective July 1, 2011.

McHale now serves as the president and chief executive officer of Cane Investments, LLC, a small family-owned fund where her son Brian O'Halloran is the managing director. Cane Investments makes investments in start-ups in the fields of technology and the environment.

McHale is the former president and chief executive officer of Discovery Communications. For two decades, McHale helped build Discovery Communications, the parent company of the Discovery Channel cable channel, into a global media enterprise with 1.4 billion subscribers in 170 countries.

== Early life ==
The daughter of a U.S. Foreign Service officer, McHale was born in New York City and grew up in Britain and apartheid-era South Africa. During these formative years, McHale's family home was said to be constantly under police surveillance and was wire-tapped; family friends were detained and mistreated; and she became close with key anti-apartheid activists, including Felicia Kentridge, who founded South Africa's Legal Resource Centre, and her husband Sydney Kentridge, the noted civil rights lawyer who went on to represent slain anti-apartheid activist Stephen Biko.

She is married to Michael O'Halloran and has two sons, Brian and Mark.

Her uncle was the journalist William McHale, Rome Bureau Chief for Time in the 1960s. He died along with Enrico Mattei, a leader of Italian oil company ENI, in a plane crash on October 27, 1962, later classified as a sabotage.

== Education ==
McHale graduated from the University of Nottingham in the United Kingdom and Fordham University School of Law in New York. She has received honorary degrees from the University of Maryland, American University, the University of Miami and Colby College.

== Career ==
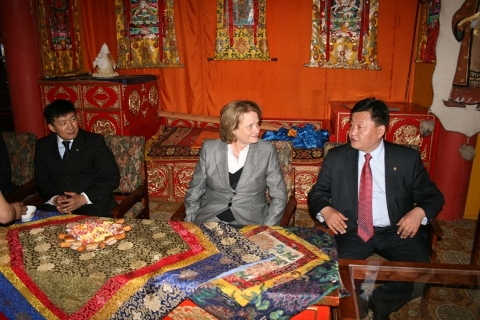
Judith McHale with Mongolian Ministers Otgonbayar and Bayartsogt at dinner following a tour of Amarbayasgalant Monastery in Mongolia, 2010.

In the 1980s, McHale served as general counsel for MTV Networks, overseeing legal affairs for MTV, Nickelodeon and VH-1.

In 1987, McHale became general counsel at Discovery Communications, then a small company with a single U.S. cable channel. She went on to serve as chief operating officer, chief executive officer, and president, helping to grow Discovery into a large media company, with more than 100 channels available in 35 languages and distributed to more 1 billion subscribers in over 170 countries. During her tenure as president, Discovery's revenues increased tenfold, with annual revenues topping $3 billion.

McHale and others at Discovery understood something important about communicating with people around the world: It makes more sense to engage people internationally on their own terms, in ways that respect their languages and customs, than it does just to bring them warmed-over versions of American programming. Discovery, nearly alone among American media companies that expanded internationally, put respect for cultural context and local voices at the heart of its business and creative strategies. It modified programming to respect viewers' regional customs and translated – rather than simply subtitled—into 35 different languages.

McHale helped forge strategic partnerships, including an alliance in 1998 with the BBC that enabled a marriage of high-quality content and global distribution strength. Under her leadership the Discovery/BBC joint venture produced numerous documentaries including "Blue Planet", "Walking with Dinosaurs" and the award-winning "Planet Earth. She also spearheaded numerous corporate acquisitions, including The Learning Channel in 1991 and the Travel Channel in 1997.

As a manager at Discovery Communications, McHale oversaw operations across 22 countries. The company received recognition in several workplace rankings, and, in 2004, McHale was named a "National Family Champion" by Working Mother magazine.

At Discovery, McHale launched education and development initiatives in the United States and around the world, including the Discovery Channel Global Education Partnership, which provides free educational programming and technological support to more than a half million students at 200 schools and community centers throughout rural Africa, Latin America, and Eastern Europe.

In 2006, after nearly 20 years at Discovery, McHale moved to Global Environment Fund, a private equity firm based in Chevy Chase, MD. McHale worked to launch the GEF/Africa Growth Fund, an investment vehicle intending to focus on supplying expansion capital to small and medium-sized enterprises that provide consumer goods and services in emerging African markets.

Prior to joining the Department of State, McHale served on the boards of directors of Polo/Ralph Lauren, Host Hotels and Resorts and DigitalGlobe, Inc. Ms. McHale currently serves on the boards of directors of SeaWorld Entertainment, Ralph Lauren Corporation Hilton Worldwide, Inc. and Yellow Media Limited.

== Public service ==
In 1998, McHale was appointed by Governor Parris Glendening to a four-year term as a member of the Maryland State Board of Education. In September, 2013 McHale was appointed by Secretary of the Interior, Sally Jewell, as chair of the President's Advisory Council on Wildlife Trafficking.

McHale has also provided leadership to a range of organizations engaged in global affairs and development. She served on the boards of the Africa Society of the National Summit on Africa, Africare, the Colonial Williamsburg Foundation, the National Democratic Institute, and Vital Voices. In 2008, she was the co-chair of the Platform Committee of the Democratic National Convention.

Political offices
Preceded by James K. Glassman	Under Secretary of State for Public Diplomacy and Public Affairs; 2009–2011	Succeeded by Kathleen Stephens; Acting
