= Celeste A. Wallander =

American government official (born 1961)

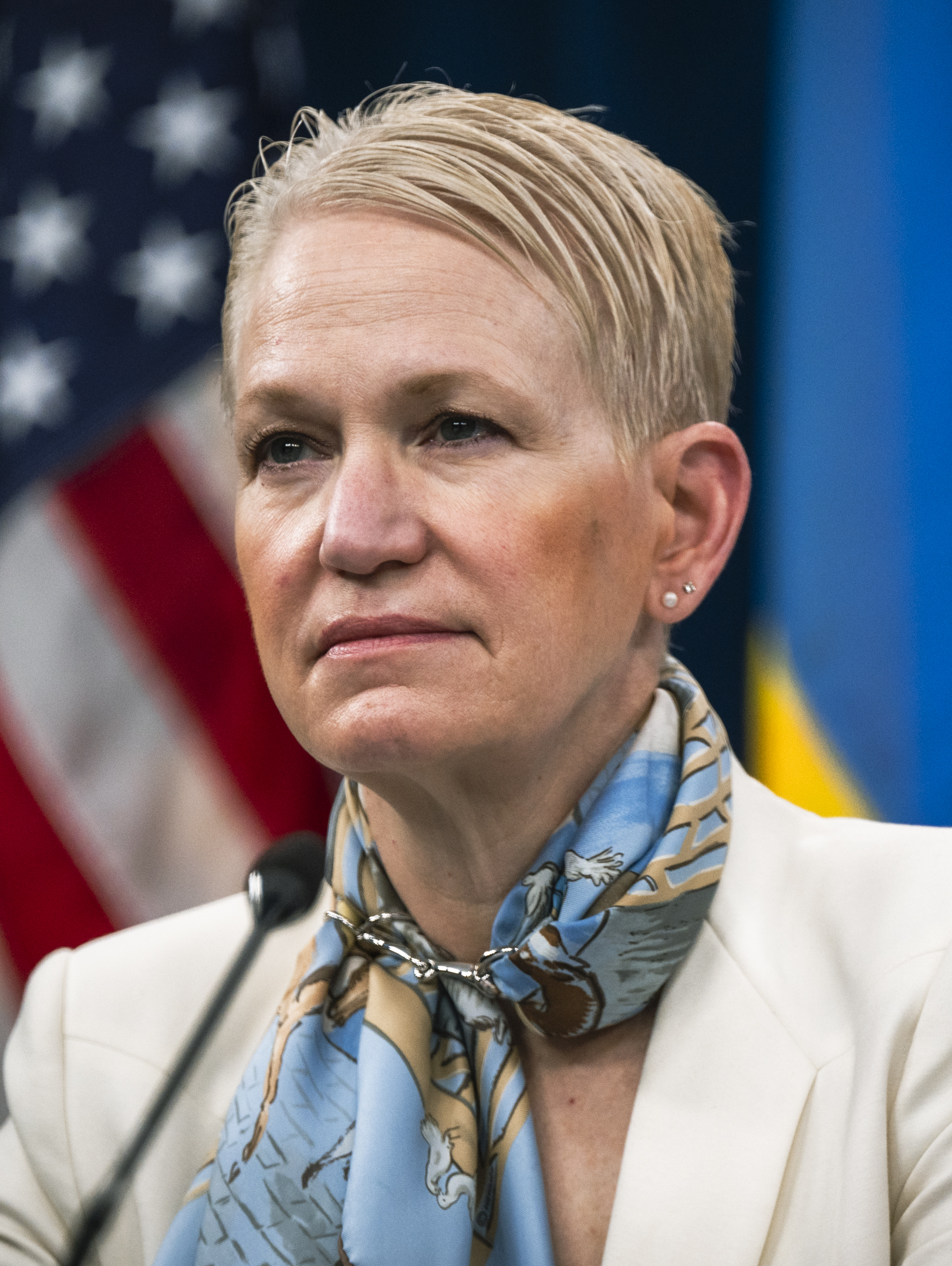

Assistant Secretary of Defense for International Security Affairs
- In office February 22, 2022 – January 20, 2025
- President: Joe Biden
- Preceded by: Robert Karem (2018)
- Succeeded by: Daniel Zimmerman

Personal details
- Born: 1961 (age 64–65)
- Party: Democratic
- Education: Northwestern University (BA); Yale University (MA, PhD)
- Celeste A. Wallander's voice Wallander's opening statement at a House Armed Services Committee hearing on the security environment in Europe; Recorded March 30, 2022

Celeste Ann Wallander (born 1961) is an American international relations advisor who served as assistant secretary of defense for international security affairs at the United States Department of Defense.

== Education ==
Wallander received her BA summa cum laude in political science from Northwestern University in 1983. She received her MA (1985), MPhil (1986) and PhD (1990) degrees in political science from Yale University.

== Career ==
Wallander was previously a professor of government at Harvard University (1989–2000), senior fellow at the Council on Foreign Relations (2000–2001), director and senior fellow of the Russia and Eurasia Program at the Center for Strategic and International Studies (2001–2006), and visiting professor at Georgetown University (2006–2008). Wallander founded the Program on New Approaches to Russian Security and the Eurasian Strategy Project. From 2009 to 2013 she was a professor in the School of International Service at American University.

Wallander was special assistant to the president and senior director for Russia and Eurasia on the National Security Council from 2013 to 2017. Earlier in the Obama administration she had served as deputy assistant secretary of defense for Russia, Ukraine, and Eurasia in the Office of the Under Secretary of Defense for Policy from May 2009 to July 2012. Wallander was an adviser to Barack Obama during the 2008 Democratic primary campaign. From 2017 to 2022 she was president and chief executive of the U.S.-Russia Foundation.

=== Biden administration ===
On June 22, 2021, President Joe Biden nominated Wallander to be assistant secretary of defense for international security affairs. Hearings were held before the Senate Armed Services Committee on January 13, 2022. The committee favorably reported her nomination to the Senate floor on February 1, 2022. Wallander was confirmed by the entire Senate by a vote of 83–13 on February 16, 2022.

At her confirmation hearing in January 2022, as Russian forces gathered on Ukraine's borders, Wallander told the Senate Armed Services Committee that the Obama administration's response to Russia's 2014 seizure of Crimea had been "too slow and too incremental" and that the United States should have sent Ukraine weapons. As assistant secretary she was responsible for defense policy toward Europe, Russia and Eurasia, the Middle East and Africa, oversaw security cooperation and foreign military sales, and led the department's policy on support for Ukraine after the Russian invasion of February 2022. In February 2024, when President Volodymyr Zelenskyy replaced Valerii Zaluzhnyi as commander-in-chief with Oleksandr Syrskyi, she said the United States would work with the new commander, whom she called "an experienced, successful commander". She left office at the end of the Biden administration in January 2025.

=== Later career ===
In January 2025 Wallander became an adjunct senior fellow at the Center for a New American Security and a senior advisor at WestExec Advisors. In June 2025 she became the first executive director of Penn Washington, the University of Pennsylvania's office in Washington, D.C.

== Publications ==
- (co-editor) Swords and Sustenance: The Economics of Security in Belarus and Ukraine. MA: MIT Press, 2004. ISBN 9780262278126
- (co-editor) The Sources of Russian Foreign Policy after the Cold War. Boulder, Colo.: Westview Press, 1996. ISBN 9780367295905
- Mortal Friends, Best Enemies: German-Russian Cooperation after the Cold War. Ithaca, NY: Cornell University Press, 1999. ISBN 9780801486081
- (co-editor) Imperfect Unions: Security Institutions over Time and Space. Oxford; New York: Clarendon Press, 1999. ISBN 9780198207955
- Wallander, Celeste A. (1992). "Opportunity, Incrementalism, and Learning in the Extension and Retraction of Soviet Global Commitments". Security Studies. 1 (3): 514–542.
- "NATO's Price: Shape Up or Ship Out". Foreign Affairs, 2002.
- "Rocket Science 101". Foreign Policy, October 8, 2012.

== See also ==
- Department of Defense appointments by Joe Biden

== Sources ==
- Rocket Science 101
- Biography from the United States Department of Defense
- Interview with Radio Free Europe
- NATO's Price: Shape Up or Ship Out (2002) - article in Foreign Affairs magazine
