= Derek Chollet =

American foreign policy advisor and former government official

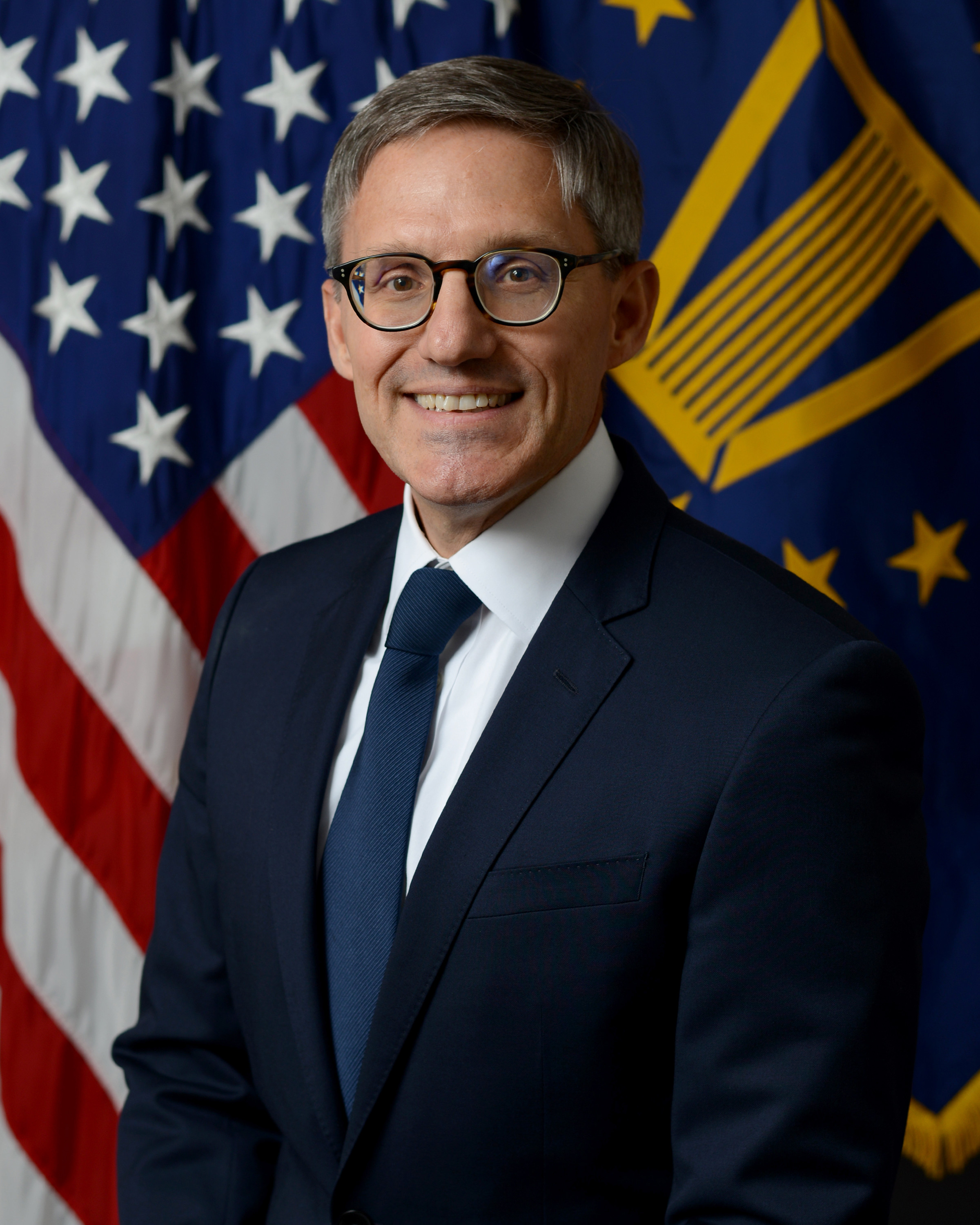

Chief of Staff to the United States Secretary of Defense
- In office July 8, 2024 – January 20, 2025
- President: Joe Biden
- Preceded by: Kelly Magsamen
- Succeeded by: Joseph R. Casper

35th Counselor of the United States Department of State
- In office January 20, 2021 – July 7, 2024
- President: Joe Biden
- Preceded by: Ulrich Brechbuhl
- Succeeded by: Tom Sullivan

Assistant Secretary of Defense for International Security Affairs
- In office June 1, 2012 – January 15, 2015
- President: Barack Obama
- Preceded by: Alexander Vershbow
- Succeeded by: Robert Karem

Personal details
- Born: Illinois, U.S.
- Party: Democratic
- Education: Cornell University (BA); Columbia University

Derek Chollet is an American foreign policy advisor and author who is currently a managing director and head of the JPMorgan Chase Center for Geopolitics. He is also a Carnegie Distinguished fellow at Columbia University's Institute of Global Politics. Until January 2025 he had served as chief of staff to the United States Secretary of Defense. He served as the 35th counselor of the United States Department of State from 2021 to 2024. Previously, Chollet was the executive vice president for security and defense policy at the German Marshall Fund of the United States. From 2012 to 2015, Chollet was Assistant Secretary of Defense for International Security Affairs, where he managed U.S. defense policy involving Europe, NATO, the Middle East, Africa, and the Western Hemisphere for Secretaries of Defense Leon Panetta and Chuck Hagel.

== Early life and education ==
Chollet was born in Illinois in 1970 and raised in Lincoln, Nebraska. He graduated from Lincoln Southeast High School in 1989 and has been named a distinguished alumni. While in high school he was co-captain of the 1989 Nebraska State Champion High School Swim Team. He earned a Bachelor of Arts in Government and History from Cornell University in 1993, where he studied with diplomatic historian Walter LaFeber and political scientist Theodore J. Lowi. In 1992, he was the recipient of the Harry S. Truman Scholarship. From 1995 to 1999, he studied towards a PhD in political science at Columbia University, where his mentor was Professor Robert Jervis, but left early—he says he was "ABD," all-but-dissertation.

== Career ==
Chollet started in Washington in 1993, when he was the research assistant to former secretary of state James A. Baker III helping him with his memoir, The Politics of Diplomacy. In 1996, he was asked by the State Department to write a comprehensive history of the Dayton Peace Accords, which was declassified in 2003. From 1997-1998, he assisted former Secretary of State Warren Christopher with the research and writing of his memoirs. In 1999 he joined the Clinton Administration, where he served as chief speechwriter for UN ambassador Richard Holbrooke and as special advisor to deputy secretary of state Strobe Talbott. From 2002 to 2004, Chollet was foreign policy adviser to U.S. senator John Edwards (D-NC), both on his legislative staff and during the 2004 Kerry-Edwards presidential campaign.

=== Obama Administration ===
From November 2008 to January 2009, he was a member of the Obama-Biden presidential transition team. From 2009 to 2011, he was the principal deputy director of secretary of state Hillary Clinton’s policy planning staff. From 2011 to 2012, Chollet served in the White House Office as special assistant to the president and senior director for strategic planning on the United States National Security Council.

Chollet has been a fellow at the Center for a New American Security (CNAS), the Brookings Institution, the Center for Strategic and International Studies (CSIS), and the American Academy in Berlin. He has been a visiting scholar and adjunct professor at George Washington University and an adjunct associate professor at Georgetown University.

In addition to assisting Baker with his memoirs, from 1996 to 1999 Chollet assisted former U.S. secretary of state Warren Christopher with the research and writing of his books In the Stream of History and Chances of a Lifetime. He also aided Richard Holbrooke in writing his book To End a War. In 2001, he assisted Strobe Talbott with his book The Russia Hand. Chollet is the author of The Long Game: How Obama Defied Washington and Redefined America's Role in the World (Public Affairs, 2016). He was a contributing editor to Foreign Policy, where he co-edited "Shadow Government," and he was also a regular contributor to Defense One. He was also an advisor to Beacon Global Strategies and an Adjunct Senior Research Scholar at the Arnold A. Saltzman Institute of War and Peace Studies.

=== Biden Administration ===
In November 2020, Chollet was named a volunteer member of the Joe Biden presidential transition agency review team to support transition efforts related to the United States Department of State. Later, he was announced as the counselor of the United States Department of State. While at the State Department, he served as a top advisor to Secretary of State Antony Blinken and worked on such issues as the response to the October 7 attacks against Israel, Russia's war against Ukraine, the Balkans, Pakistan, Northern Ireland, and the crisis in Burma.

On July 24, 2023, the Biden administration nominated Chollet to replace Colin Kahl as Under Secretary of Defense for Policy, but his nomination was subsequently held up by Senator Tommy Tuberville, R-Alabama.

On March 30, 2024, Chollet met with anti-Myanmar junta representatives from the Kachin Independence Organization, Karen National Union, Karenni National Progressive Party, and Chin National Front to discuss future US relations with a federal Myanmar.

On June 24, 2024, Defense Secretary Lloyd Austin tapped Chollet to be the Pentagon's Chief of Staff.

=== Awards ===
He is the recipient of numerous honors and awards, including the Department of Defense Medal for Distinguished Public Service, the Secretary of Defense Medal for Outstanding Public Service, the State Department Superior Honor Award, the Latvia Minister of Defense Medal of Honorary Recognition, and the Lithuania Minister of Defense Medal of Merit.

== Publications ==
Chollet is the author, co-author or co-editor of eight books on American foreign policy. His commentaries and reviews on U.S. foreign policy and politics have appeared in many other books and publications.

- The Middle Way: How Three presidents Shaped America's Role in the World (Oxford University Press, 2021)
- The Long Game: How Obama Defied Washington and Redefined America's Role in the World (Public Affairs, 2016)
- The Road to the Dayton Accords: A Study of American Statecraft (Palgrave Macmillan, 2005)
- America Between the Wars: From 11/9 to 9/11, co-authored with James Goldgeier (Public Affairs, 2008)
- The Unquiet American: Richard Holbrooke in the World, co-edited with Samantha Power (Public Affairs, 2011)

Chollet has contributed nearly two dozen op-eds to Defense One, a national-security publication based in Washington, D.C. He has also written dozens of articles for the Washington Post, Foreign Policy Magazine, The Atlantic, The National Interest, and many other publications.
