= Michael Nacht =

American government official (born 1942)

- Born: September 1, 1942 (age 83); New York, New York
- Occupations: Government official and an author

Michael Leonard Nacht (born September 1, 1942) is an American government official and an author of five books and 70 journal articles.

Born in New York City, Nacht graduated from Christopher Columbus High School in 1959. He earned a B.S. degree in aeronautics and astronautics from New York University in 1963, an M.S. degree in statistics from Case Western Reserve University in 1966, an M.S. degree in operations research from New York University in 1969, an M.A. degree in political science from the New School for Social Research in 1970 and a Ph.D. degree in political science from Columbia University in 1973.

Nacht was an associate director at the Center for Science and International Affairs at Harvard Kennedy School of Government from 1973 to 1984, and then, from 1986 to 1994 worked as a dean and professor at the School of Public Affairs of the University of Maryland. From 1994 to 1997 he worked as an assistant director of Strategic and Eurasian Affairs of the Arms Control and Disarmament Agency and helped the Clinton administration to negotiate the arms reduction between United States, Russia and China. From 1998 to 2008 he was a dean at the Goldman School of Public Policy in the University of California, Berkeley. After the September 11 attacks, he became an Assistant Secretary of Defense for Robert Gates. On May 18, 2009, he was appointed as an Assistant Secretary of Defense for Global Strategic Affairs. He is currently a full professor of public policy at the University of California, Berkeley, where he teaches a course on nuclear security.
