= James N. Miller =

American government official (born 1959)

James Miller
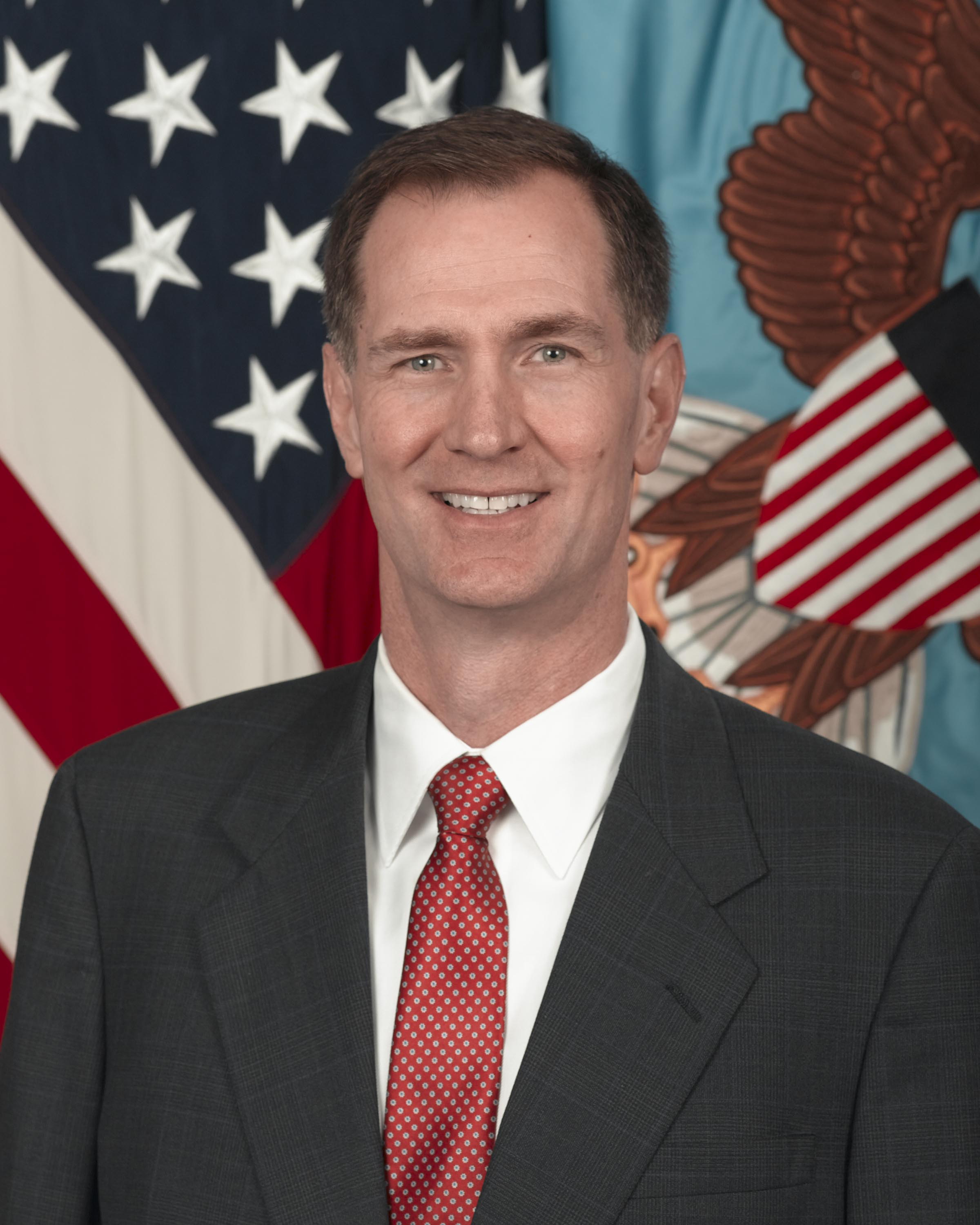

10th Under Secretary of Defense for Policy
- In office February 18, 2012 – January 8, 2014
- President: Barack Obama
- Preceded by: Michèle Flournoy
- Succeeded by: Christine Wormuth

Personal details
- Born: James Northey Miller Jr. August 15, 1959 (age 67) Waterloo, Iowa
- Education: Stanford University (BA); Harvard University (MA, PhD)

James Northey Miller Jr. (born August 15, 1959) is the Johns Hopkins Applied Physics Laboratory's Assistant Director for Policy and Analysis and also serves on the National Security Council staff as U.S. Coordinator for the Australia-United Kingdom-United States (AUKUS) security agreement. He previously served as the Under Secretary of Defense for Policy from February 18, 2012 until January 8, 2014 and as Deputy Under Secretary of Defense from April 2009 to February 2012.

== Early life and education ==
Born in Waterloo, Iowa, Miller earned his B.A. with honors in economics from Stanford in 1981; he earned his master's degree and his Ph.D., both in public policy, from the John F. Kennedy School of Government at Harvard University. His 1989 Ph.D. thesis was Approaching Zero: An Evaluation of Radical Reductions in Superpower Nuclear Arsenals.

== Career ==
He was senior professional staff member for the House Armed Services Committee (1988-1992), assistant professor at Duke University (1992-1997); Deputy Assistant Secretary of Defense for Requirements, Plans, and Counterproliferation Policy (1997-2000); and Senior Vice President (2003-2007) and Vice President (2000-2003) at Hicks and Associates, Inc.

He then served as Senior Vice President and Director of Studies at the Center for a New American Security (2007-2009). Miller was confirmed by the U.S. Senate as the Deputy Under Secretary of Defense for Policy and as the Under Secretary of Defense for Policy.

Miller is a member of the Council on Foreign Relations and International Institute for Strategic Studies. In 2000, he was awarded the Secretary of Defense Medal for Outstanding Public Service. He is a four-time recipient of the Medal for Distinguished Public Service, the highest civilian award of the U.S. Department of Defense. In 2015, Miller joined Johns Hopkins APL as a senior fellow and was named as the Lab's Assistant Director for Policy and Analysis in 2022. He served as a board member for the Defense Science Board from 2014-2020. He was appointed to the board again in 2022.

Miller previously served as a senior fellow at the Harvard Kennedy School’s Belfer Center for Science and International Affairs.

== Resignation from Defense Science Board ==
On June 2, 2020, Miller resigned from the Defense Science Board in protest after police used pepper balls and smoke canisters to disperse protesters in the area surrounding Lafayette Park so that President Donald Trump, accompanied by U.S. Secretary of Defense Mark Esper, could attend a photo op at the St. John's Episcopal Church across from the White House. In an open resignation letter to Esper, Miller cited the oath of office that he had taken to "support and defend the Constitution of the United States," and wrote that Esper and Trump had violated the same oath, writing:

President Trump’s actions Monday night violated his oath to “take care that the laws be faithfully executed,” as well as the First Amendment "right of the people peaceably to assemble." You may not have been able to stop President Trump from directing this appalling use of force, but you could have chosen to oppose it. Instead, you visibly supported it.
Anyone who takes the oath of office must decide where he or she will draw the line: What are the things that they will refuse to do? Secretary Esper, you have served honorably for many years, in active and reserve military duty, as Secretary of the Army, and now as Secretary of Defense. You must have thought long and hard about where that line should be drawn. I must now ask: If last night's blatant violations do not cross the line for you, what will?

Miller also criticized Esper's statement urging state governors to "dominate the battlespace," writing: "I cannot believe that you see the United States as a 'battlespace,' or that you believe our citizens must be 'dominated.' Such language sends an extremely dangerous signal."
