= WestExec Advisors =

American consulting firm

WestExec Advisors LLC
- Company type: Private
- Industry: Risk and strategic consulting
- Founded: 2017
- Founder: Antony Blinken; Michèle Flournoy
- Headquarters: Washington, DC, United States
- Website: westexec.com

WestExec Advisors LLC is a consulting firm founded in 2017 by Antony Blinken, Michèle Flournoy, Sergio Aguirre, and Nitin Chadda, all former Obama administration officials. Lisa Monaco, Robert O. Work, Avril Haines, David S. Cohen, and Jen Psaki have also been WestExec employees. Richard Stengel, former President Obama's Under Secretary of State for Public Diplomacy and Public Affairs is a current employee.

In an interview with The Intercept, Flournoy explained WestExec seeks to employ "people recently coming out of government" with "current knowledge, expertise, contacts, networks." The firm and its partners avoid becoming registered lobbyists or foreign agents so that they can (re)enter government service without delays. It does not disclose its clients, whose names are restricted from disclosure by non-disclosure agreements. The firm is named after West Executive Avenue, a street near the West Wing of the White House.

== Clients and activities ==
Although WestExec does not disclose its list of clients, some have been reported. Its clients include Google's Jigsaw; Windward, an Israeli artificial intelligence firm; Shield AI, a drone surveillance company; and Fortune 100 types.

Under a financial disclosure filed by the Biden transition team in December 2020, Secretary of State nominee Antony Blinken declared that clients of WestExec included Blackstone, Bank of America, Facebook, Uber, McKinsey & Company, SoftBank, Gilead, Lazard, Boeing, AT&T, Royal Bank of Canada, LinkedIn, and Sotheby's. In a similar form, Director of National Intelligence-designate Avril Haines disclosed that WestExec had worked with Palantir Technologies.
