= Michèle Flournoy =

American defense policy advisor

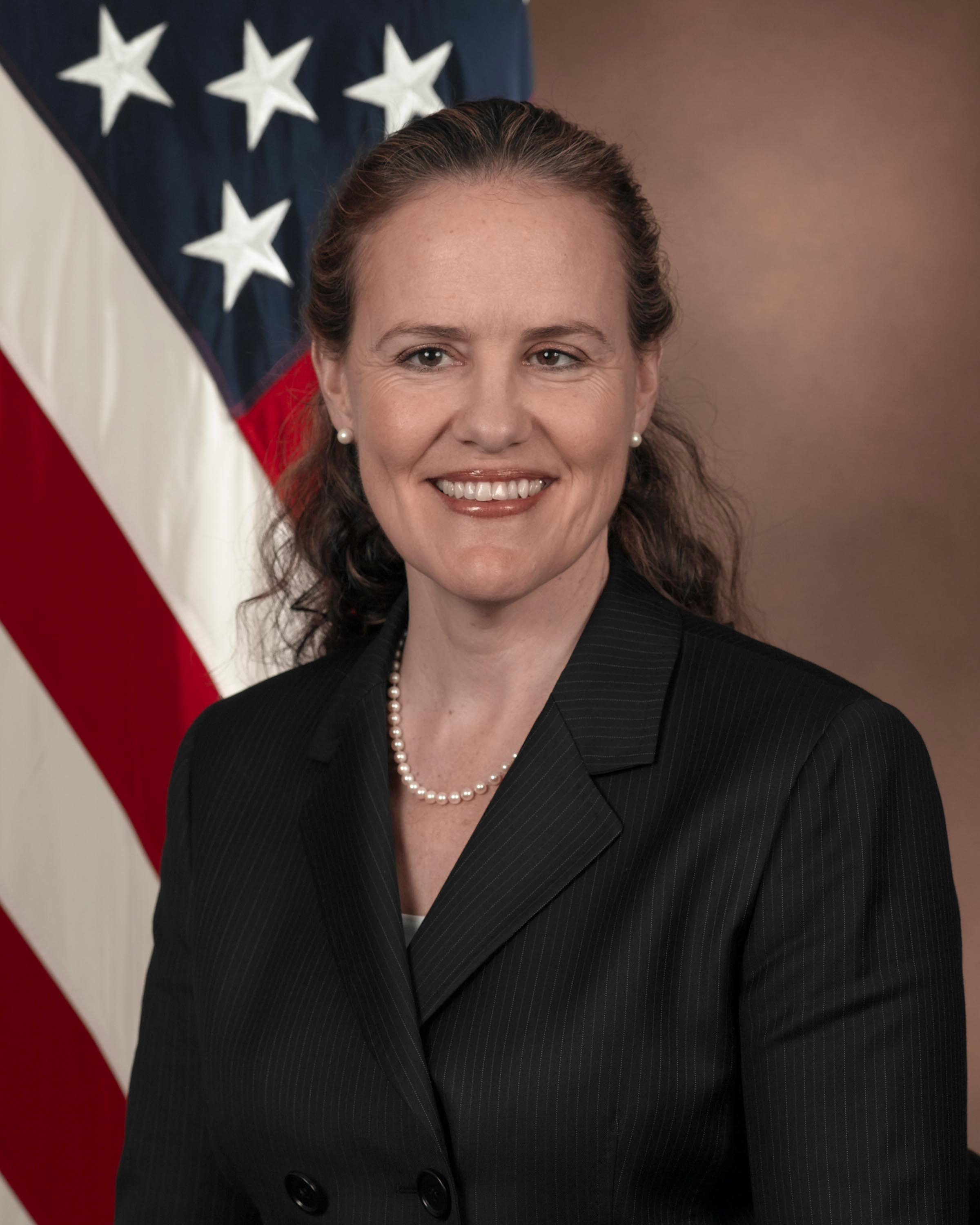
- Flournoy in 2009

9th Under Secretary of Defense for Policy
- In office February 9, 2009 – February 3, 2012
- President: Barack Obama
- Preceded by: Eric Edelman
- Succeeded by: James Miller

Personal details
- Born: December 14, 1960 (age 65) Los Angeles, California, U.S.
- Spouse: W. Scott Gould
- Children: 3
- Education: Harvard University (AB); Balliol College, Oxford (MLitt)

Michèle Angélique Flournoy (/flɔːrnɔɪ/; born December 14, 1960) is an American defense policy advisor who served as deputy assistant secretary of defense for strategy under President Bill Clinton and under secretary of defense for policy under President Barack Obama.

As under secretary of defense for policy, Flournoy was the highest-ranking woman in the history of the Department of Defense. In that position, Flournoy crafted the Obama administration's counter-insurgency policy in Afghanistan and helped persuade President Obama to intervene militarily in Libya.

In 2007, Flournoy co-founded the Center for a New American Security. She is a co-founder and the current managing partner of WestExec Advisors.

== Early life and education ==
Flournoy was born on December 14, 1960, in Los Angeles, California. Her father, George Flournoy, was a cinematographer who worked on shows including I Love Lucy and The Odd Couple. He died of a heart attack when she was 14 years old. Flournoy attended Beverly Hills High School in Beverly Hills, California. She was an exchange student in Belgium, where she learned French, for one year.

Flournoy received a BA in social studies from Harvard University in 1983. She received an M.Litt. in international relations in 1986 from Oxford University, where she was a Newton-Tatum scholar at Balliol College. In 1986, she was a research analyst at the Center for Defense Information. By 1989, Flournoy was working at the Arms Control Association. From 1989 until 1993, she worked at Harvard's John F. Kennedy School of Government, where she was a research fellow in its international security program.

== Career ==
=== Clinton administration (1996–2000) ===
Flournoy served in the Clinton administration in the United States Department of Defense, where she was both principal deputy assistant secretary of defense for strategy and threat reduction and deputy assistant secretary of defense for strategy.

Flournoy was awarded the Secretary of Defense Medal for Outstanding Public Service in 1996, the Department of Defense Medal for Distinguished Public Service in 1998 and the chairman of the Joint Chiefs of Staff's Joint Distinguished Civilian Service Award in 2000.

While serving under the Clinton administration as a deputy assistant secretary of defense, Flournoy was the principal author of the 1997 Quadrennial Defense Review, which argued that "determined U.S. forces must be capable of fighting and winning two major theater wars nearly simultaneously."

She was a primary contributor to the 2001 Quadrennial Defense Review.

=== Public policy research ===
Flournoy then joined the Institute for National Strategic Studies at the National Defense University (NDU) as a research professor, founding and leading NDU's Quadrennial Defense Review (QDR) working group.

Flournoy then moved to the Center for Strategic and International Studies (CSIS), where she worked as a senior advisor on a range of defense policy and international security issues. In 2002, a year before the US invasion of Iraq, she argued for preemptive strikes by the US against foreign weapons stockpiles. Flournoy told The Washington Post, "In some cases, preemptive strikes against an adversary's [weapons of mass destruction] capabilities may be the best or only option we have to avert a catastrophic attack against the United States."

==== Founder of CNAS (2007) ====
In 2007, Flournoy co-founded the Center for a New American Security (CNAS) with Kurt M. Campbell. She was named CNAS's president. Flournoy and Campbell wrote a 2007 policy paper called "The Inheritance and the Way Forward" that advocated for a US foreign policy "grounded in a common-sense pragmatism rather than ideology".

=== Obama's first term (2009–2012) ===
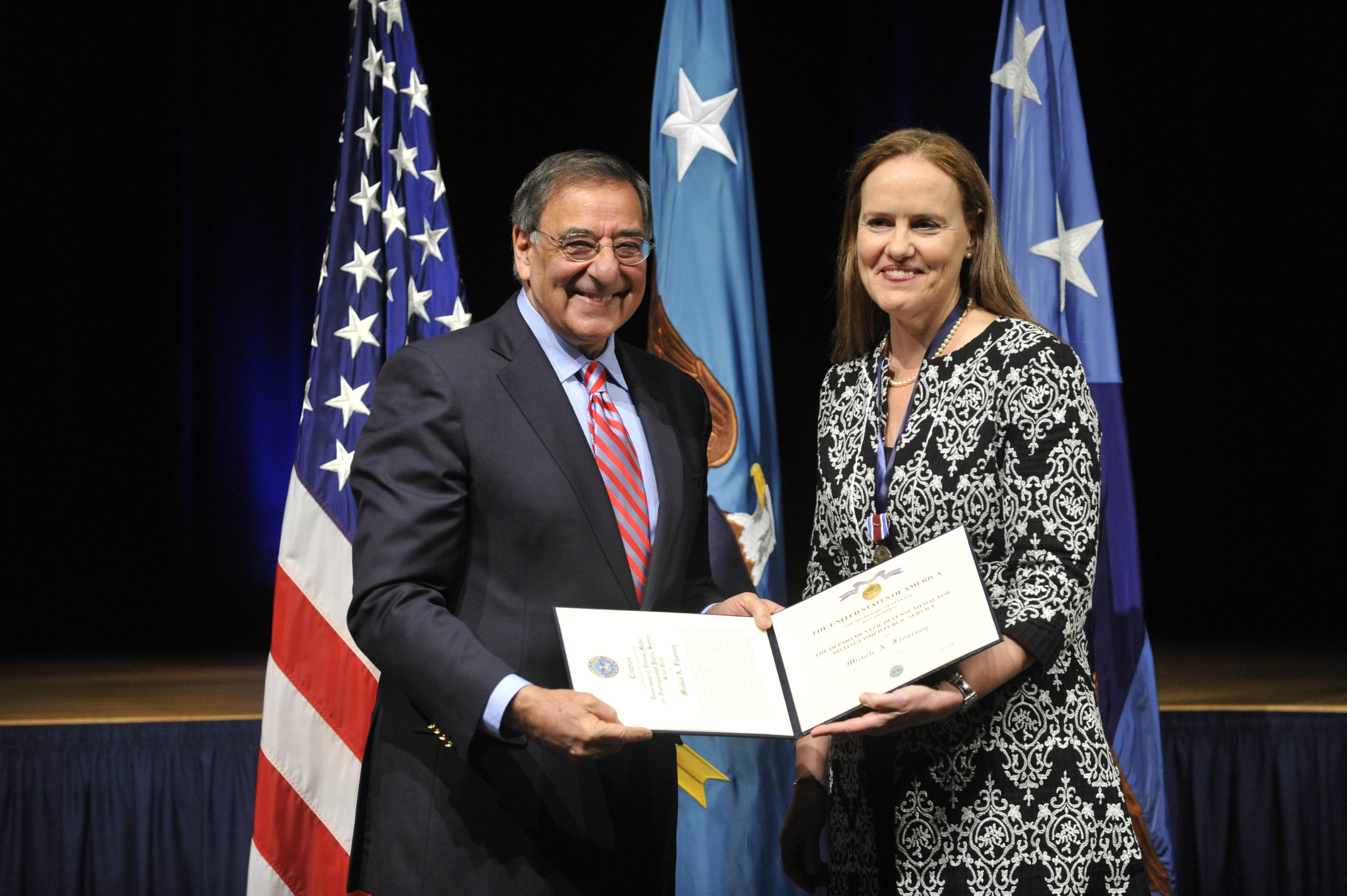
Flournoy with Secretary of Defense and former CIA Director Leon Panetta in January 2012

After the 2008 presidential election, Flournoy was selected as one of the review team leads for the Obama transition at the Department of Defense. On January 8, 2009, President-elect Obama announced that he was nominating her as under secretary of defense for policy, to serve under Secretary of Defense Robert Gates. When the United States Senate confirmed her nomination on February 9, 2009, she became the highest-ranking woman in the history of the Department of Defense.

In 2009, Flournoy told The New York Times that she had spent much of her adult life steeped in the practice of war. "We're trying to recognize that warfare may come in a lot of different flavors in the future," she said.

While serving in the Obama administration, Flournoy crafted the administration's policy of counter-insurgency in Afghanistan. She supported the surge of troops in Afghanistan and helped to design the administration's policy in that regard. In 2009, as under secretary of defense for policy, she also supported a US "civilian surge" in Afghanistan, coupling increased economic aid with at least 400 new counter-insurgency experts, and doubling the US military presence to 68,000 troops by the end of the year.

From February 2009 to February 2012, Flournoy was a principal advisor to U.S. Secretaries of Defense Robert Gates and Leon Panetta.

On December 12, 2011, Flournoy announced that she would step down in February 2012 to return to private life and contribute to President Barack Obama's re-election bid.

==== Libya ====
In 2011, Flournoy, then under secretary of defense for policy, helped persuade President Obama to intervene militarily in Libya, despite opposition from members of Congress and key White House advisors, such as Joe Biden, Vice President; Tom Donilon, National Security Advisor; and Robert Gates, Defense Secretary. Flournoy supported the NATO-led imposition of a no-fly zone over Libya to oust resistant leader Muammar Gaddafi, accused of ordering the killing of demonstrators and promising to "hunt the rebels down and show no mercy." Flournoy said imposition of a no-fly zone necessitated first destroying Libya's air defenses with US and British cruise missiles targeting the Libyan missile defense system, and US B-2 bombers attacking Libyan airfields.

=== Rainmaker and think-tanker (Since 2012) ===
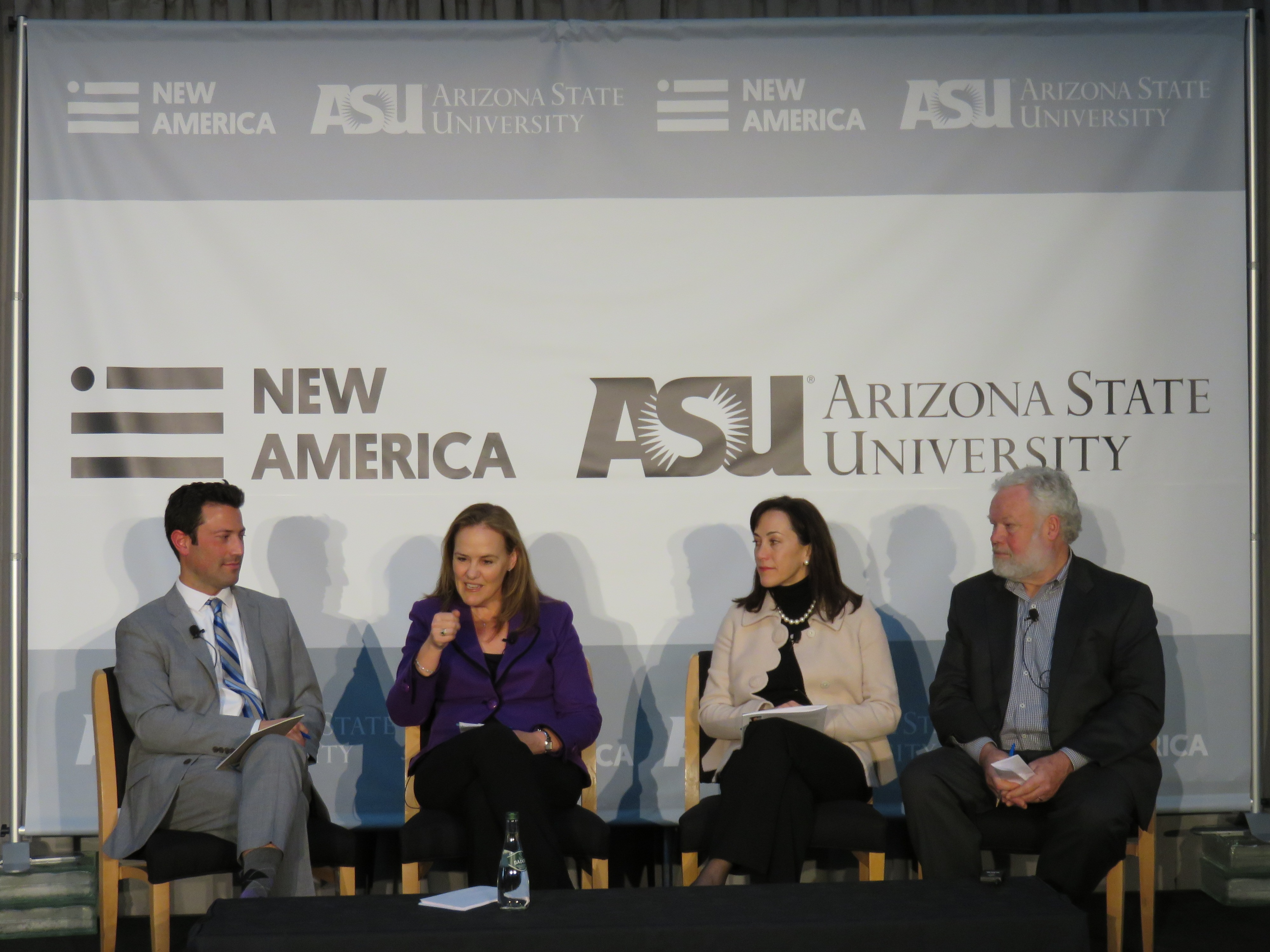
Left to right: Kevin Baron, Michèle Flournoy, Janine A. Davidson, Thomas Ricks, "Is the Pentagon Adapting Fast Enough?" panel discussion at the New America Foundation first annual Future of War conference, Washington, D.C., 25 February 2015

After leaving the Obama administration, Flournoy joined Boston Consulting Group as a senior advisor to its Washington D.C.–based public sector practice. It was reported that under Flournoy's direction the Boston Consulting Group's military contracts went "from $1.6 million in 2013 to $32 million in 2016".

In a 2013 conversation with the Council on Foreign Relations, Flournoy said she had supported US military intervention on humanitarian grounds. Critics who disagreed with Flournoy described the war on Libya as "disastrous" in its destabilization of entire regions in the Middle East and North Africa, facilitating the transfer of arms to extremists across countries. Two years after the ouster of Muammar Gaddafi, Flournoy defended the US military intervention in Libya, telling the Council on Foreign Relations: "I think we were right to do it."

As well as being, for a time, a member of the President's Intelligence Advisory Board and a member of the CIA Director's External Advisory Board, Flournoy was, in 2014, a senior fellow at Harvard's Belfer Center for Science and International Affairs.

At least in 2014 Flournoy sat on the board of the Atlantic Council.

==== Hypothetical role in Clinton administration (2016) ====
In June 2016 while she was rumoured to be "Hillary Clinton's Likely Defense Secretary", Flournoy advocated regime change in Syria, supporting "limited military coercion" to remove President Bashar al-Assad from office.

==== Co-founder WestExec Advisors (2017) ====
In 2017, Flournoy, along with Antony Blinken, US Deputy Secretary of State in the Obama administration, co-founded WestExec Advisors, a consulting firm, where she holds the post of managing partner.

==== As corporate director ====
In 2018, Flournoy joined the board of Booz Allen Hamilton, receiving $440,000, mostly in company stock options during the first two years since her appointment. She has received some criticism for her role as a director at Booz Allen Hamilton, including by authors affiliated with the Project on Government Oversight (POGO).

As of December 1, 2020, Flournoy was an advisor to Pine Island Capital, a private equity firm. In December 2020, Pine Island raised $218 million to pay for investments in military and aerospace and other industries. In its September 2020 S.E.C. filing, Pine Island forecast that the Defense Department "will prioritize rapid technological advancements" in artificial intelligence and other technologies.

Flournoy was in 2018 on the board of directors of Amida Technology Solutions.

==== Hypothetical role in Biden administration (2020) ====
Flournoy was widely speculated to be a leading contender to serve as secretary of defense under President Joe Biden. She was tarnished by liberal critics for her international consulting and private equity associations.

During the 2020 presidential transition of Joe Biden, Flournoy had been viewed as being "at the top of Biden's list" to be Secretary of Defense. In December 2020, Gen. Lloyd Austin was reported to have been chosen instead.

In a webinar hosted by the Israel Policy Forum in June 2020, Flournoy expressed concern that Israel's proposed unilateral annexation of the West Bank could lead Congress to deny almost $4 billion in annual US aid to Israel. "I would hate to see some in Congress decided they are going to hold hostage our security assistance to Israel as a way of protesting their policies in the West Bank." Flournoy added that a fraying of the US-Israel relationship would be disastrous for US interests.

During the 2020 US presidential election, Flournoy stated that she opposed lifting economic sanctions against North Korea and Iran, though might support waivers for medical supplies during the global COVID-19 pandemic.

In an August 2020 interview with Defense News, Flournoy stated that she favored shifting money from more traditional military expenditures to unmanned systems "that dramatically improve . . . our ability to project power to defend an interest or an ally who's under threat".

In November 2020, when Flournoy was under consideration for Secretary of Defense, she wrote, “the department and Congress may want to consider a new type of funding authority that supports both the development and testing of new digital technologies." The Project on Government Oversight (POGO) criticized Flournoy for using "opaque" language to skirt government oversight.

In June 2020 Flournoy argued that the US must invest in new military technologies and more long-range missiles, escalate US troop deployment to the South China Sea area, and step up roving war games in Asia to deter Chinese aggression. Without such ramped-up US military activity and absent the technology to ward off a Chinese cyber attack on US navigation systems, Flournoy asserted the US could stumble into a nuclear confrontation with China over Taiwan sovereignty.

In a November 2020 CNAS report, "Sharpening the U.S. Military Edge: Critical Steps for the Next Administration," Flournoy argued the U.S. military must be more competitive with China "to keep its military-technological edge." She called for prioritizing artificial intelligence, cyber warfare, unmanned and autonomous weapons systems.

== Political positions ==
Spencer Ackerman has described Flournoy as a centrist. Van Jackson, a former colleague, described her approach as that of a "classic liberal internationalist."

== Other affiliations ==
She is a member of the Aspen Strategy Group, the Council on Foreign Relations, the Defense Policy Board Advisory Committee, the board of directors of Spirit of America, and the board of directors of the nonprofit newsroom The War Horse.

In 2012, Flournoy was elected as a fellow of the National Academy of Public Administration.

As of October 2023, she serves on the Special Competitive Studies Project's board of advisors.

== Personal life ==
Flournoy's husband, W. Scott Gould, is a retired captain who served for 26 years in the United States Navy Reserve. He was a vice president at IBM before becoming United States Deputy Secretary of Veterans Affairs. The couple has three children and reside in Bethesda, Maryland.

== Publications ==
- Flournoy, Michèle A. (1993). Nuclear Weapons after the Cold War: Guidelines for U.S. Policy. New York: HarperCollins. ISBN 0-06-501128-7. OCLC 26096682.
- Campbell, Kurt M.; Flournoy, Michèle A. (2001). To Prevail: An American Strategy for the Campaign against Terrorism. Washington, DC: Center for Strategic and International Studies. ISBN 0-89206-407-2. OCLC 48376173.
- Flournoy, Michèle A.; Murdock, Clark A. (2002). Revitalizing the U.S. Nuclear Deterrent. Washington, DC: Center for Strategic and International Studies. ISBN 0-89206-412-9. OCLC 49942326.
- Flournoy, Michèle A.; Pan, Michael (December 2002). "Dealing with Demons: Justice and Reconciliation". The Washington Quarterly. 25 (4): 111–123. doi:10.1162/016366002760252572. ISSN 0163-660X. S2CID 154855643.
- Flournoy, Michèle A. (2006). "Nation-Building: Lessons Earned and Unlearned". In Fukuyama, Francis (ed.). Nation-Building: Beyond Afghanistan and Iraq. Johns Hopkins University Press. pp. 86–104. ISBN 9780801889301. OCLC 213306057.
- Flournoy, Michèle A.; Brimley, Shawn W. (2006). "Strategic Planning for National Security: A New Project Solarium" (PDF). Joint Force Quarterly. 41: 80–86. Archived (PDF) from the original on November 21, 2019.
- Flournoy, Michèle A. (March 2006). "Did the Pentagon Get the Quadrennial Defense Review Right?". The Washington Quarterly. 29 (2): 67–84. doi:10.1162/wash.2006.29.2.67. ISSN 0163-660X. S2CID 154323525.
- Campbell, Kurt M.; Flournoy, Michèle A. (June 27, 2007). The Inheritance and the Way Forward (Report). Washington, DC: Center for a New American Security.
- Brimley, Shawn W.; Flournoy, Michèle A. (September 10, 2007). "No Genocide, No Al Qaeda, No Division of Iraq". Democracy. 6: 27–31. ISSN 1931-8693. ProQuest 212196644.
- Flournoy, Michèle A.; Davidson, Janine (2012). "Obama's New Global Posture: The Logic of U.S. Foreign Deployments". Foreign Affairs. 91 (4): 54–63. ISSN 0015-7120. JSTOR 23218039.
- Flournoy, Michèle A. (July 7, 2013). "The Smart-Shopping Way to Cut Defense Spending". The Wall Street Journal. ISSN 0099-9660. ProQuest 1398341163.
- Campbell, Kurt; Edelman, Eric; Flournoy, Michèle; Fontaine, Richard; Hadley, Stephen J.; Kagan, Robert; Rubin, James P.; Smith, Julianne; Steinberg, James; Zoellick, Robert (May 2016). Extending American Power (PDF) (Report). Center for a New American Security. Archived (PDF) from the original on November 15, 2020.
- Flournoy, Michèle A. (June 18, 2020). "How to Prevent a War in Asia". Foreign Affairs.

Political offices
Preceded by Eric Edelman	Under Secretary of Defense for Policy; 2009–2012	Succeeded by James Miller
