= National Defense Strategy =

Current master plan for US military and counterterrorism contingency

The National Defense Strategy (NDS) is produced by the United States Office of the Secretary of Defense (OSD) and is signed by the United States Secretary of Defense as the United States Department of Defense's (DoD) capstone strategic guidance. The NDS is required by law that mandates the secretary of defense to publish a "strategic framework" to address “priority missions of the Department of Defense” and the “assumed strategic environment.” It should “support the most recent National Security Strategy (NSS) report of the President." In theory, the NSS provides guidance for the DoD to outline military planning, military strategy, force posturing, force constructs, force modernization, etc. It is expected to be produced every four years, with an "unclassified summary" made available to the public.

The NDS informs another related document, the National Military Strategy (NMS), (Note: " °Force employment addresses planning, force management, and decisionmaking to fulfill the defense objectives of the NDS. °Force development adapts functions, capabilities, and concepts to improve the current Joint Force. °Force design innovates to enable the Joint Force to do what it does differently to retain a competitive advantage against any adversary". as cited by) (Note: In DoD readiness, Joint Staff sit on the Joint Requirements Oversight Council (JROC), to advise the Chairman of the Joint Chiefs of Staff.: The Force management model begins with a projection of the Future operating environment, in terms of resources: political, military, economic, social, information, infrastructure, physical environment, and the time available to bring the Current Force to bear on the situation.; The JROC serves as a discussion forum of these factors.; The relevant strategy is provided by DoD leadership.; A DOTMLPF analysis models the factors necessary to change the Current force into a relevant Future force.; A JCIDS process identifies the gaps in capability between Current and Future force.; A Force design to meet the materiel gaps is underway.; An organization with the desired capabilities (manpower, materiel, training) is brought to bear on each gap.; A budget request is submitted to Congress.; The resources are "dictated by Congress".; Approved requests then await resource deliveries which then become available to the combatant commanders.) written by the Joint Chiefs of Staff and signed by its Chairman (CJCS). The NMS and NDS often agree, but since the CJCS's role is to give unfiltered military advice to the government, the NMS is also an opportunity for the CJCS to provide a contrary opinion, however rare. In any case, the NMS is a further refinement of the NDS to provide the U.S. military with more detailed guidance for theater campaign planning, modernization, force posturing, and force structure. NMS is often classified, while the NDS is not. By law, the Secretary of Defense has to release an unclassified summary of the classified version of the NDS.

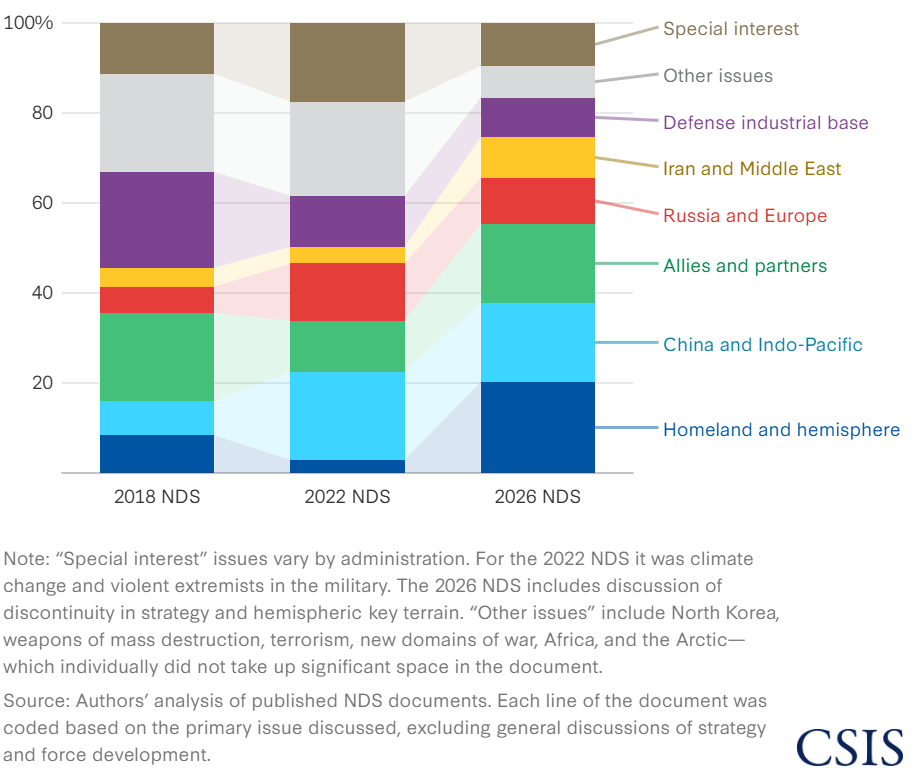
Report space on 2018, 2022, and 2026 NDS dedicated to major topics

Each NDS emphasizes different issues areas, reflecting priorities that each administration identifies as the most important for the U.S. military to address. Prioritization is a universal feature of the NDS across administrations that have to manage global interests with limited budgets.

In 2018, under the first Trump administration, the NDS became the sole successor to the Quadrennial Defense Review (QDR). The 2018 NDS focused on great power competition with China and Russia and shifted attention away from counterterrorism.

In 2022, under the Biden administration, the NDS was released on October 27 along with the Missile Defense Review (MDR) (Note: MDR Summary: 1) air/missile threat environment; 2) US strategy and policy framework; 3) strengthening international cooperation;) and Nuclear Posture Review (NPR).. The focus in the 2022 NDS was the "pacing threat" of China, followed by an "acute threat" of Russia.

In 2026, under the second Trump administration, the NDS was released on January 23, following the December 2025 publication of the NSS. The 2026 NDS's elevation of homeland and hemispheric security as the top priority for the DoD represents a major departure from previous strategies.

== See also ==
- National Military Strategy
- National Security Strategy (United States)
