= Paul J. Selva =

10th vice chairman of the Joint Chiefs of Staff

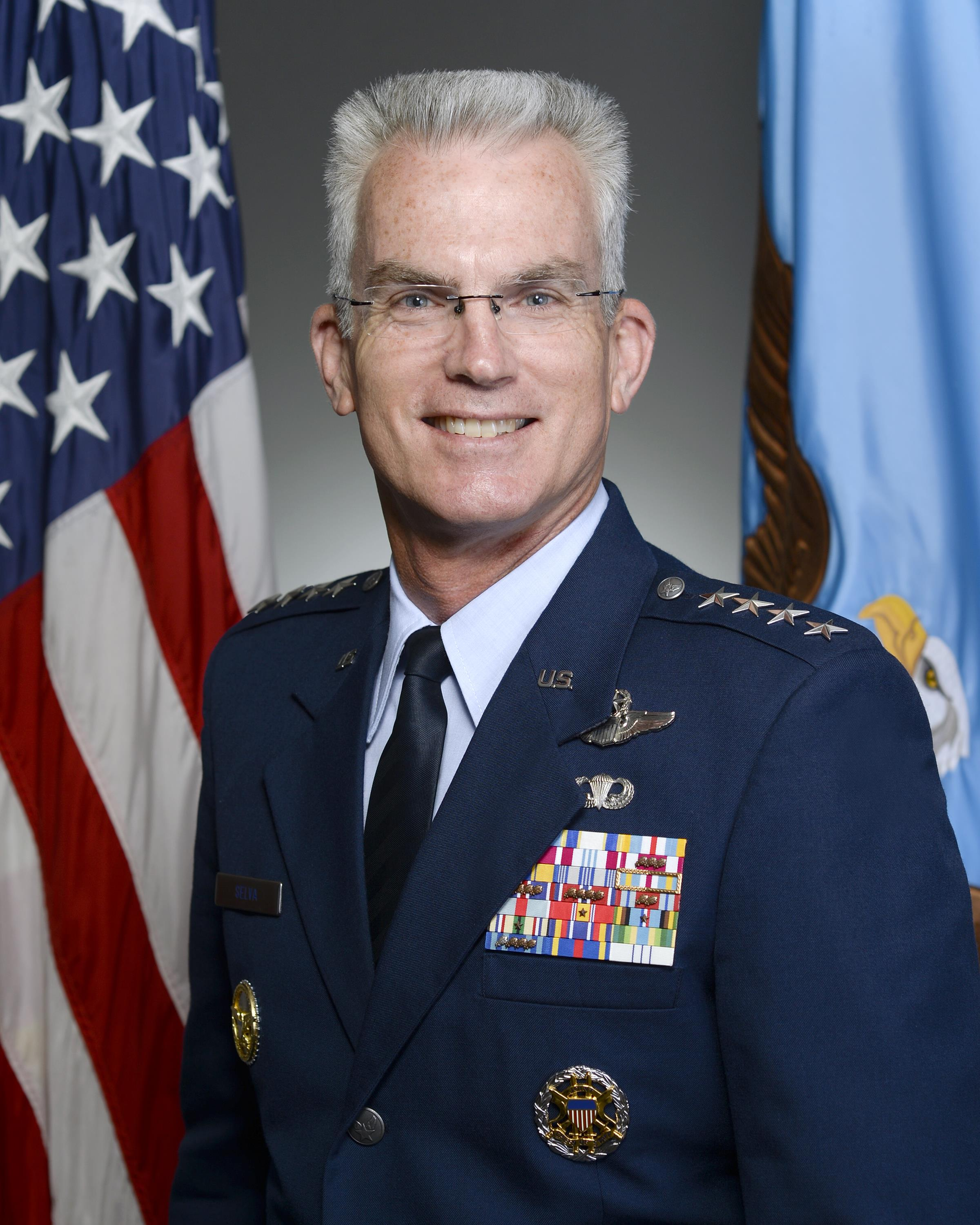
- Official portrait, 2015
- Born: 27 September 1958 (age 67); Biloxi, Mississippi, U.S.
- Allegiance: United States
- Branch: United States Air Force
- Service years: 1980–2019
- Rank: General
- Commands: Vice Chairman of the Joint Chiefs of Staff; United States Transportation Command; Air Mobility Command; 618th Air and Space Operations Center (Tanker Airlift Control Center); 62d Airlift Wing; 60th Operations Group; 9th Air Refueling Squadron
- Conflicts: Gulf War
- Awards: Defense Distinguished Service Medal (2); Air Force Distinguished Service Medal (3); Defense Superior Service Medal; Legion of Merit (2); State Department Distinguished Honor Award
- Alma mater: United States Air Force Academy (BS); Abilene Christian University (MS); Auburn University (MS)

Paul Joseph Selva (born 27 September 1958) is a retired United States Air Force four-star general who served as the tenth vice chairman of the Joint Chiefs of Staff. In this capacity, he was the nation's second-highest-ranking military officer, and the highest-ranking officer in the Air Force. He assumed his last assignment on 31 July 2015, and retired on 1 August 2019. Selva is a command pilot with more than 3,100 hours in the C-5, C-17A, C-141B, C-37, KC-10, KC-135A and T-37.

== Early life ==
Selva was born in Biloxi, Mississippi, on 27 September 1958. Shortly thereafter his family relocated to Terceira Island in the Azores archipelago, Portugal, where his father worked at Lajes Field. After attending the base high school he enrolled at the United States Air Force Academy, where he graduated in 1980 with a Bachelor of Science in aeronautical engineering. He completed undergraduate pilot training at Reese Air Force Base, Texas, where he received his pilot wings. Selva is also a graduate of Abilene Christian University, the Air Command and Staff College, and Auburn University.

== Air Force career ==
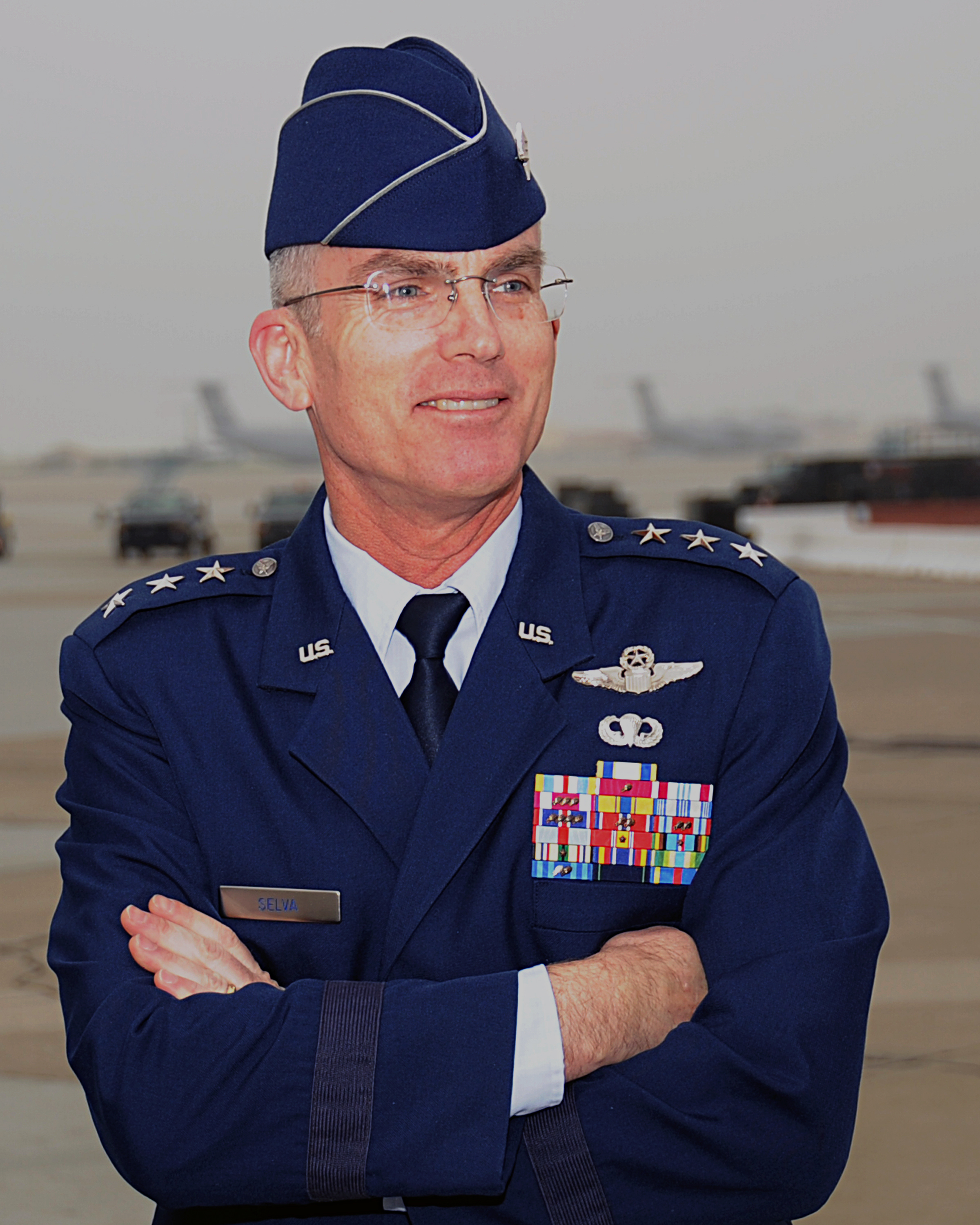
Selva as lieutenant general at Travis Air Force Base, California

In July 1981 Selva served as co-pilot and aircraft commander at the 917th Air Refueling Squadron at Dyess Air Force Base in Texas. In January 1984 Selva was assigned to Strategic Air Command 32nd Air Refueling Squadron at Barksdale Air Force Base in Louisiana, where he flew several Strategic Air Command tanker aircraft such as Boeing KC-10 Extender and Boeing KC-135 Stratotanker.

Selva later on was assigned to the headquarters of Strategic Air Command at Offutt Air Force Base, Nebraska, in January 1989, where he served as company grade adviser to the commander-in-chief of the Strategic Air Command and tasked for manager of offensive aircraft systems and executive officer and also Deputy CINCSAC for Plans and Resources. In August 1991 Selva was assigned to Air Command and Staff College at Maxwell Air Force Base and in July 1992 he served as instructor pilot and flight commander at 9th Air Refueling Squadron and later as commander of 722nd Operations Support Squadron at March Air Force Base in California. In 1993 following the end of Cold War, when Selva was a major, he published an article in Military Review that warned how military leaders could wrestle with professional integrity. The three-page article which was known as "Challenges to Integrity in our Changing Force," was seen to be apply to today's military in its path forward in the wake of wars in Afghanistan and Iraq. Selva later on became deputy commander of 60th Operations Group at Travis Air Force Base in California from June 1994 until June 1995. In July 1996 Selva was assigned to the Pentagon, Washington, D.C., where he served as assistant to the director, Office of the Secretary of Defense for Net Assessment.

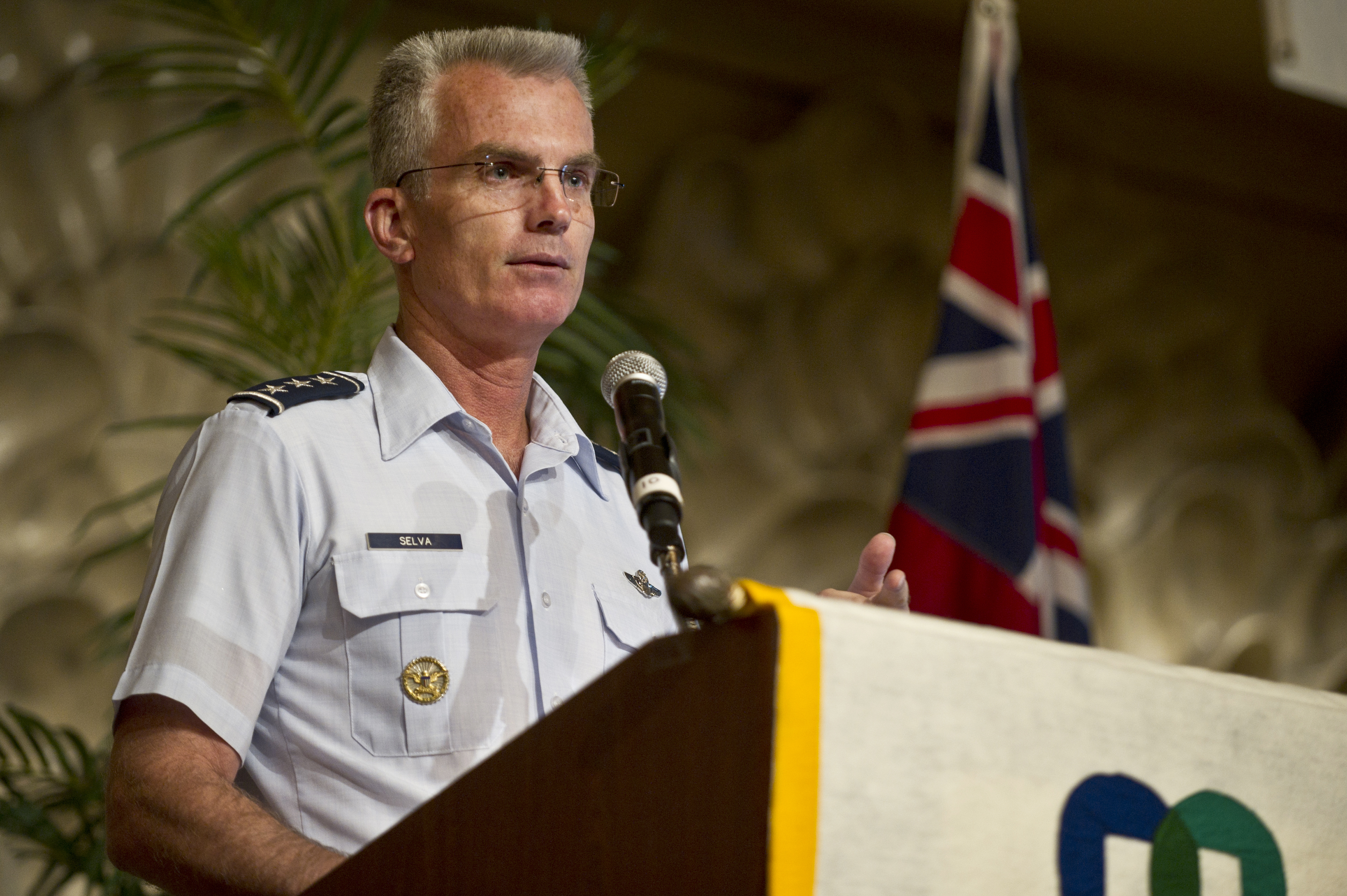
Selva speaks at Annual Hawaii Military Partnership Conference during his tenure as deputy commander of Pacific Air Forces on 5 January 2012

Selva’s career as a senior officer began in 1998 where he was promoted to colonel and became commander of 60th Operations Group at Travis Air Force Base. In July 2000 he was appointed as commander of 62nd Airlift Wing at McChord Air Force Base.

Selva received his first star in 2004 as he was promoted to the rank of brigadier general when he was appointed director of United States Transportation Command (USTRANSCOM) Combatant Command and was transferred to USTRANSCOM headquarters at Scott Air Force Base in Illinois. Selva later on was assigned as to the USAF headquarters at the Pentagon when he was appointed director of Air Force Strategic Planning and Deputy Air Force Chief of Staff for Strategic Plans and Programs and was also promoted to major general.

In October 2008 Selva became a lieutenant general when he was appointed as assistant to the chairman of the Joint Chiefs of Staff, Admiral Michael Mullen. At the time of his promotion to lieutenant general, Selva was the youngest among the active-duty lieutenant generals serving in the Air Force. In October 2011 Selva was appointed as deputy commander of Pacific Air Forces and was transferred to Pacific Air Forces Headquarters at Joint Base Pearl Harbor–Hickam, Hawaii.

=== Commander of Air Mobility Command ===
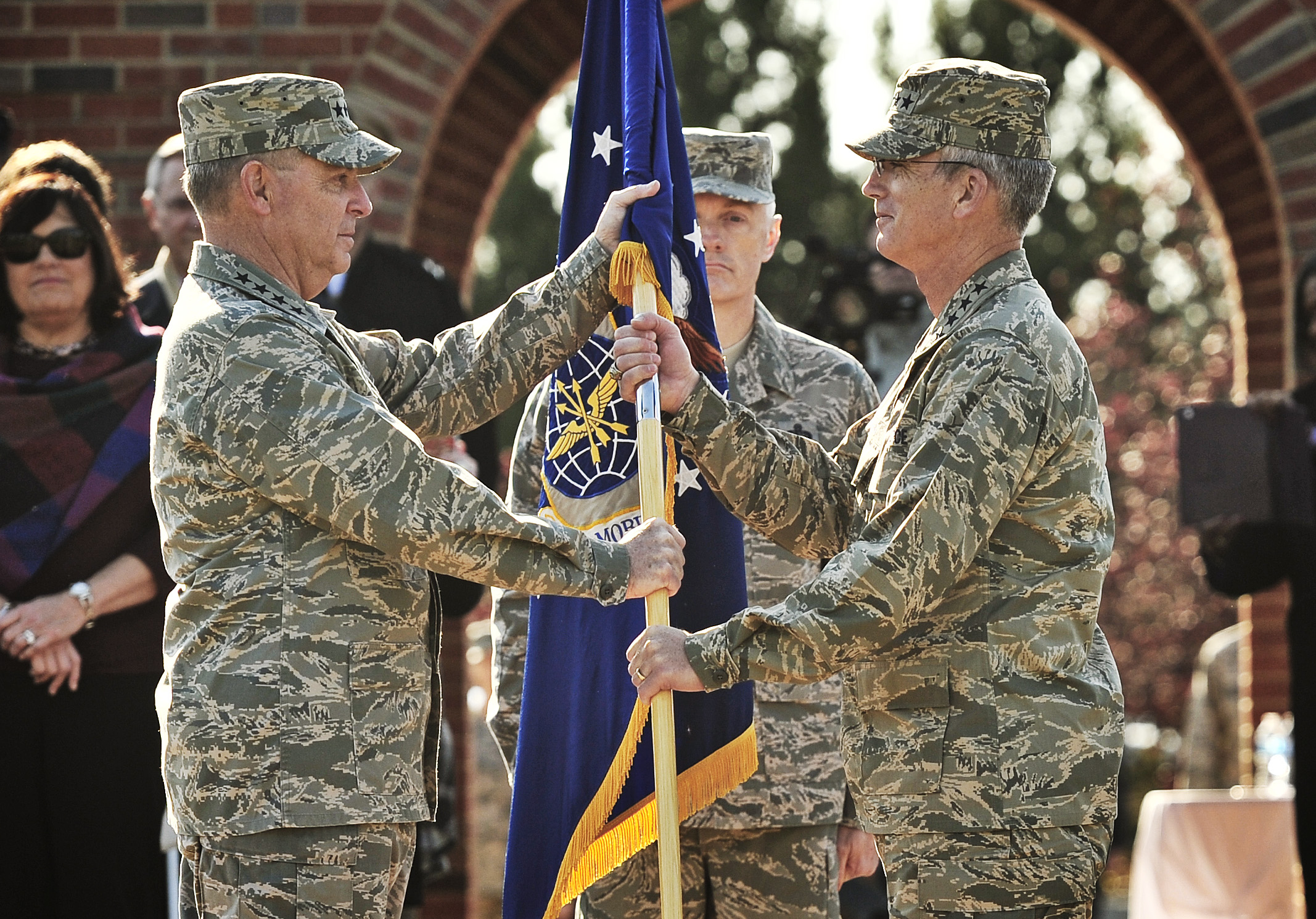
Selva assuming command of Air Mobility Command

Selva was promoted to four-star general when he was made commander of Air Mobility Command in 2012 and succeeded General Raymond E. Johns Jr. As commander, Selva oversaw all of the USAF global air mobility mission which contain much of the Air Force major fleet of tactical airlift and tanker aircraft, such as Boeing KC-135 Stratotanker, Boeing KC-10 Extender, Lockheed-Martin C-5 Galaxy, Boeing C-17 Globemaster III and Lockheed Martin C-130 Hercules.

Selva oversaw the last delivery of Boeing C-17 Globemaster III to be delivered to the USAF. Selva himself flew the C-17 from Boeing Facility at Long Beach California (formerly McDonnell-Douglas Facility) to the Joint Base Charleston in South Carolina. He also delivered the remarks during the delivery ceremony at Boeing Facility at Long Beach and also at Jointbase Charleston.

During his tenure as Commander of Air Mobility Command, Selva also emphasized the importance of Security Forces airmen in guarding much of the United States Air Force facility, and also participated in training many Security Forces airmen at a training session at Scott Air Force Base.

== Commander of United States Transportation Command ==
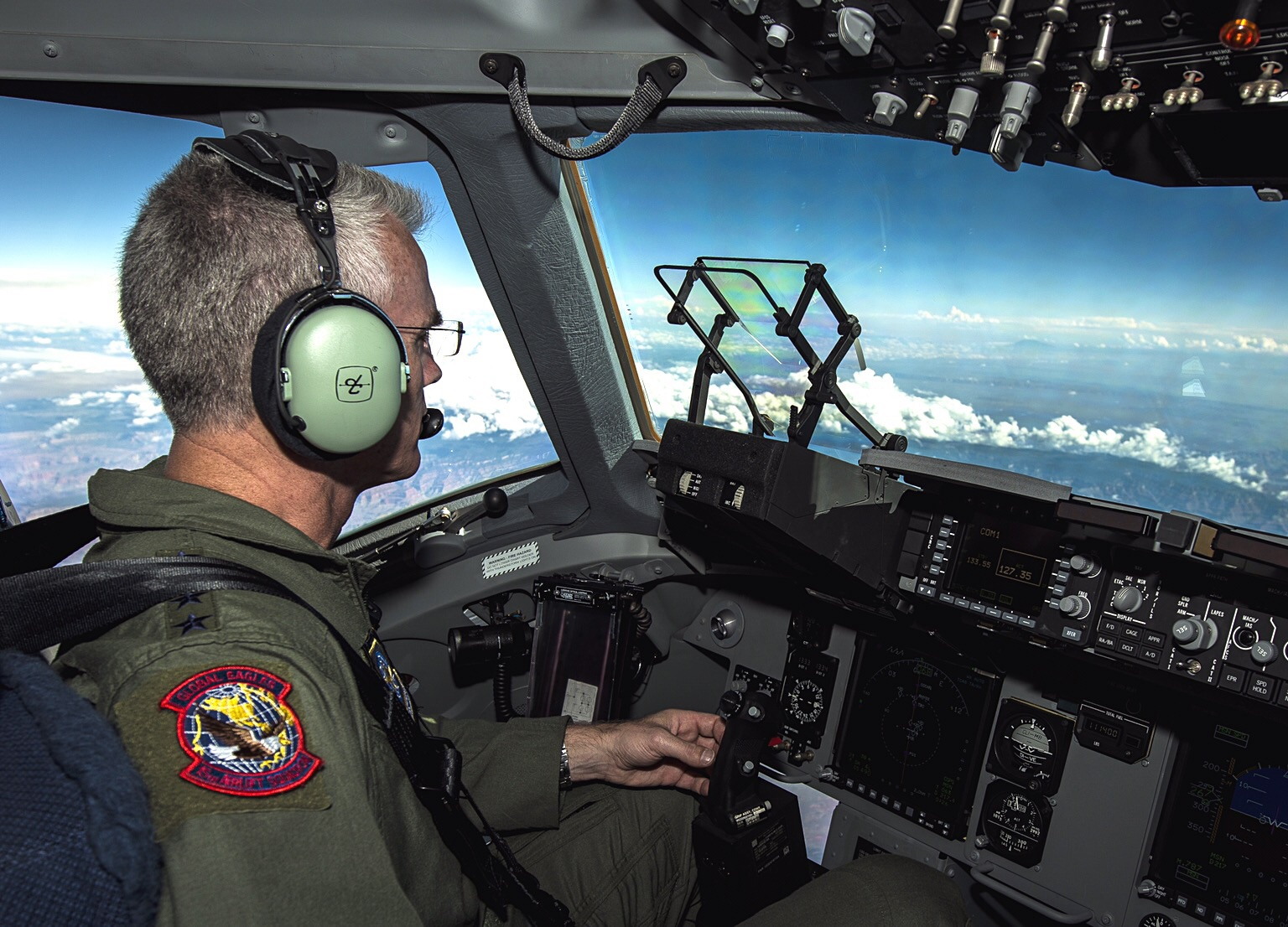
Selva piloting a Boeing C-17 Globemaster III

In 2014 Selva was appointed commander of United States Transportation Command (USTRANSCOM) succeeding General William M. Fraser III. As commander of United States Transportation Command, Selva was responsible for managing all global air, land and sea transportation of the United States Armed Forces due to USTRANSCOM which is part of eleven unified combatant command of the United States Department of Defense which has responsibility to coordinates transportation missions worldwide for global mobility using both military and commercial transportation resources.

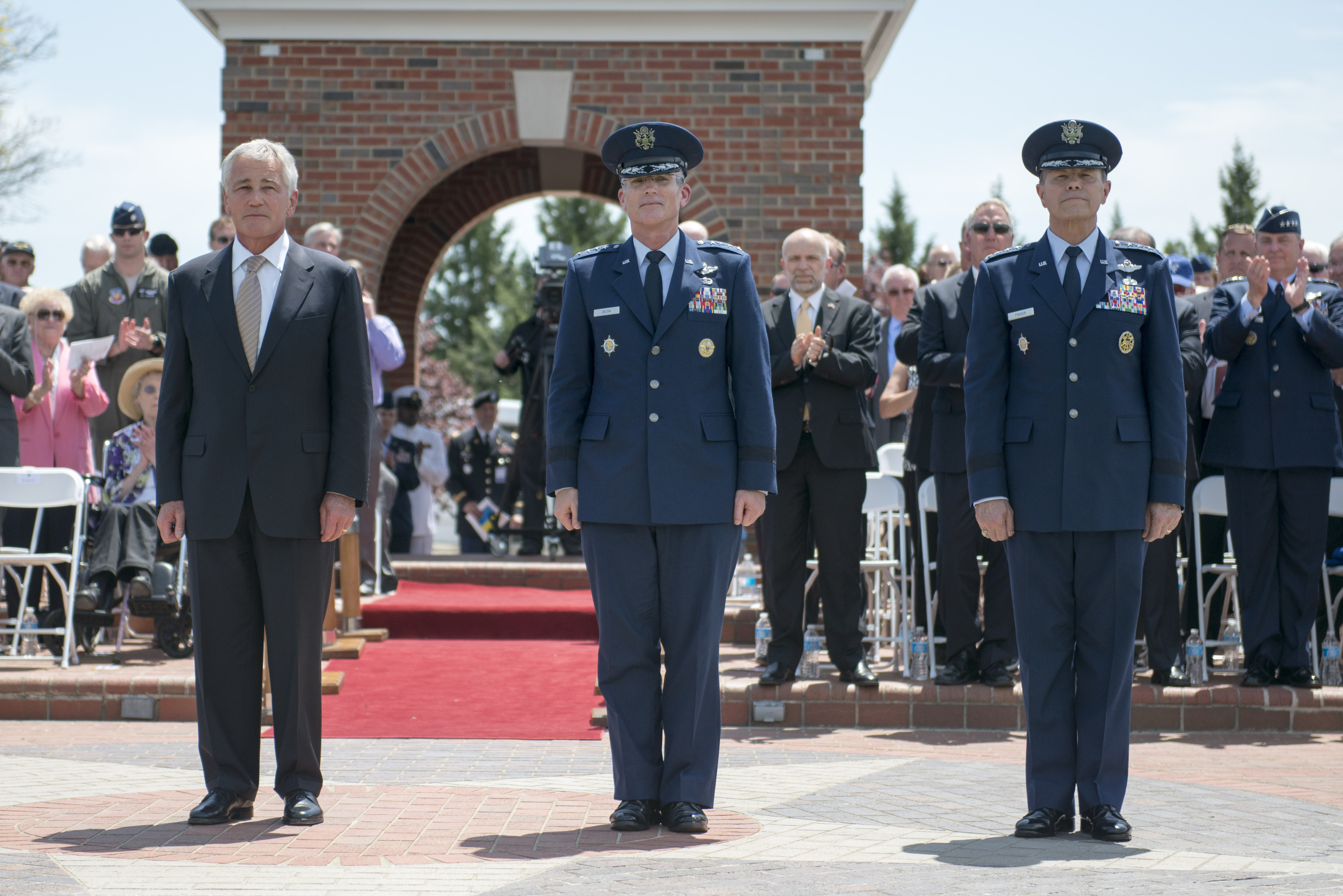
United States Transportation Command Commander Selva with Secretary of Defense Chuck Hagel and General William M. Fraser III at Scott Air Force Base, Illinois

As USTRANSCOM Commander Selva also oversaw all cargo, troops and supply movement in the entire United States military. During his tenure, Selva also spent a lot of time hauling troops and equipment from United States to major United States overseas bases such as in Afghanistan, Qatar and Japan.

Selva also oversaw major components of the military that involve supplies air-dropped to Iraqi security forces and the Kurdish peshmerga, in their campaign against ISIS militia. He emphasized the necessity to resupply them and refresh their equipment. In the wake of the Ebola virus outbreak in 2014, Selva also introduced a new isolation unit to allow the Department of Defense to air transport multiple patients with highly infectious disease. The unit was later known as Transport Isolation System. The Joint Chiefs of Staff approved funding and four months later the Transport Isolation System began operations.

== Vice Chairman of the Joint Chiefs of Staff ==
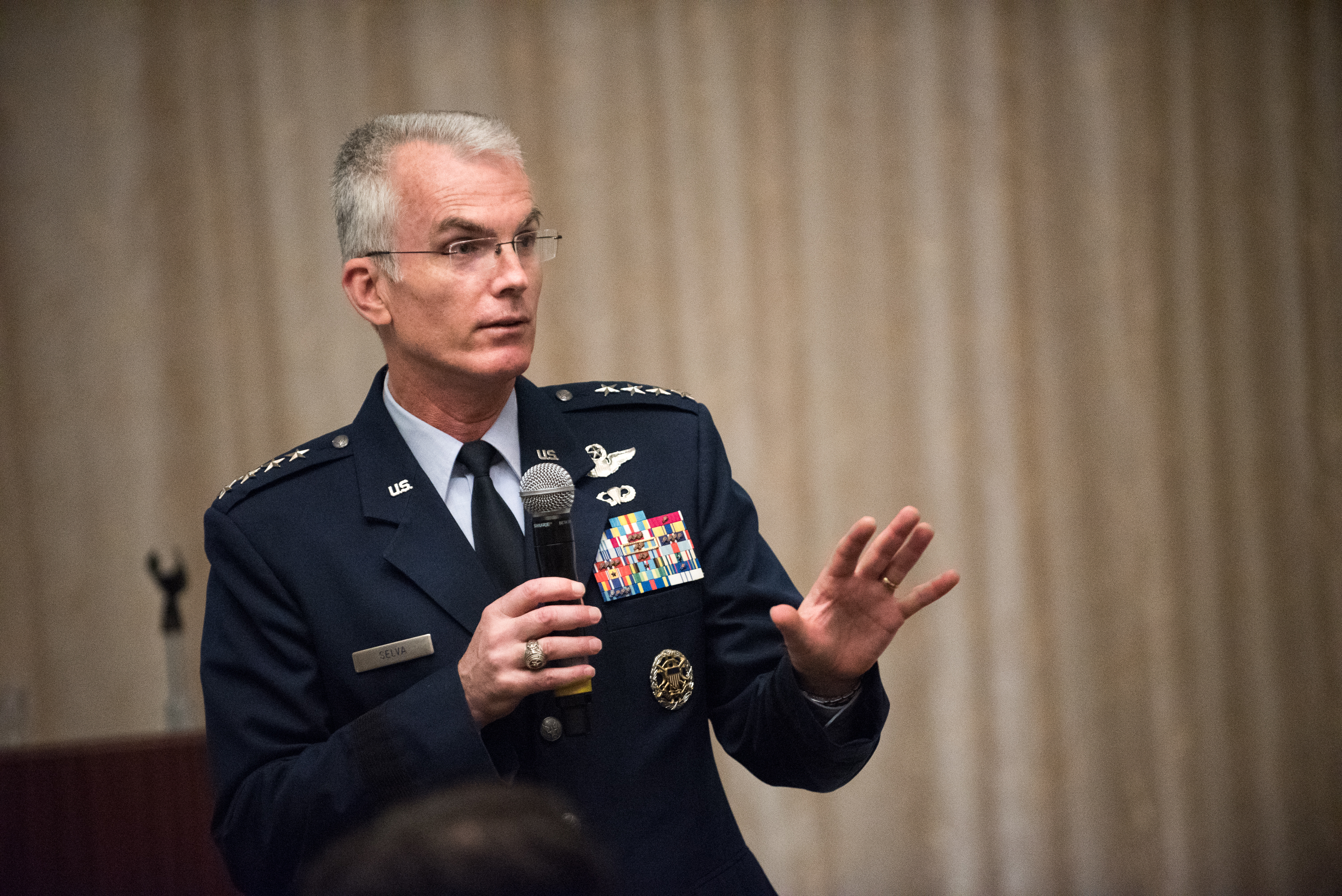
Vice Chairman of the Joint Chiefs of Staff Selva speaks at the Joint Civilian Orientation Conference on 14 August 2016

In May 2015 General Paul Selva was nominated by President Barack Obama to be the next vice chairman of the Joint Chiefs of Staff. During his confirmation hearing, Selva discussed the future threats and capabilities of foreign militaries. Selva identified Russia, China, Iran and North Korea as the nations that could be a possible threat to a future United States. He was confirmed by the US Senate in May 2015. He became the first Air Force general to assume the position since Richard Myers stepped down from the position after being appointed as Chairman of the Joint Chiefs of Staff back in 2001.

As vice chairman Selva by the United States law became the second highest-ranking military officer in the United States Armed Forces and outranked all respective heads of each service branch with the exception of the chairman. He also became the head of Joint Requirements oversight Council (JROC) and also members of Defense Acquisition Board.

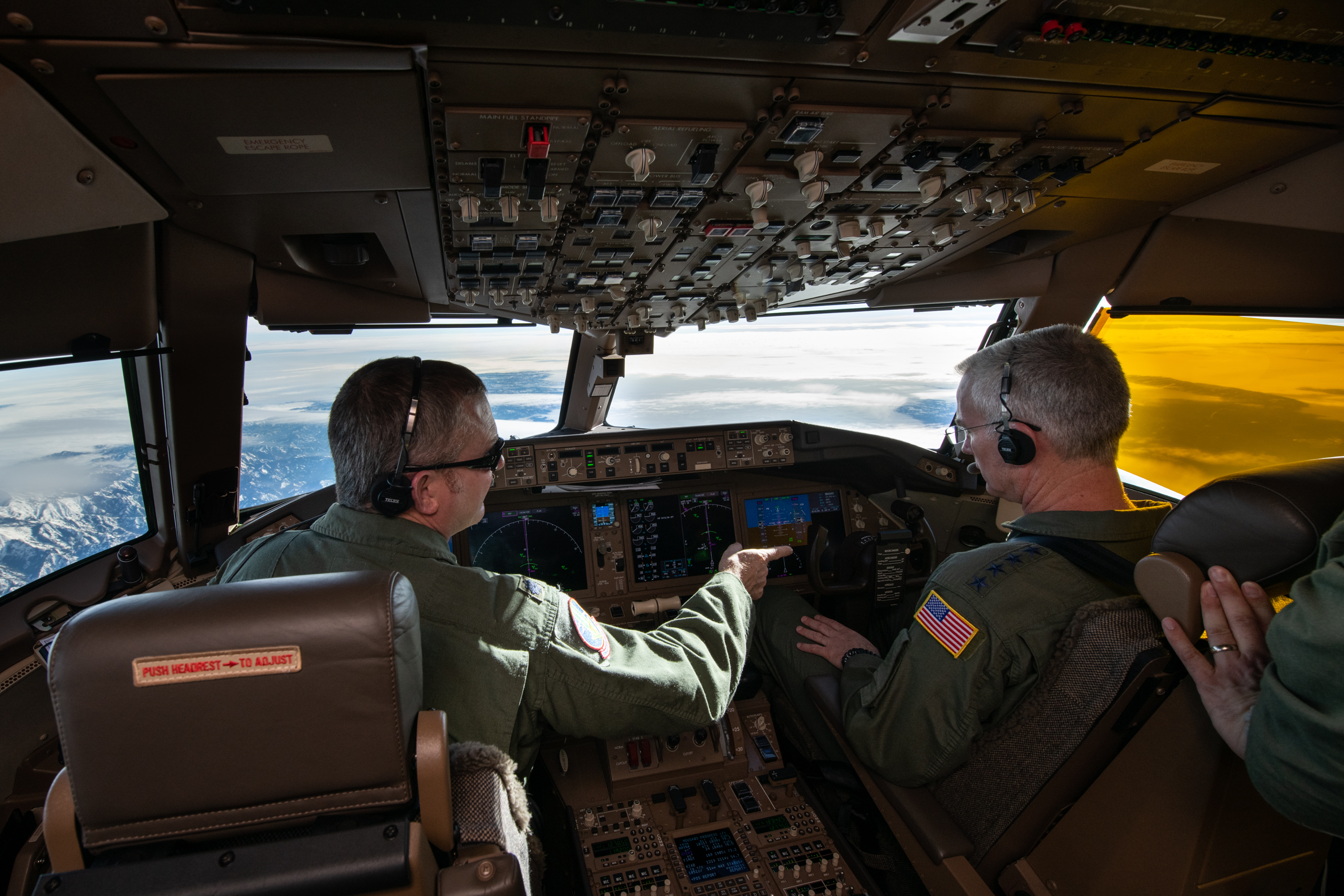
Vice Chairman of the Joint Chiefs of Staff Selva piloting a Boeing KC-46A Pegasus on 31 January 2019

During his tenure, Selva emphasized the importance of nuclear deterrence and also reasserted it as the joint force modernization priority. During testimony before the House panel on the military assessment of nuclear deterrence requirements, Selva said that over the past decade some consideration had been made to defer some nuclear force in order to modernize them to address urgent needs, while also maintaining a safe, reliable and secure nuclear arsenal and delivery capability. He said that the Joint Chiefs need to affirm the necessity to maintain the nuclear triad and to modernize the weapon system, the indications of warning, and the command and control associated with the nuclear triad. Selva spoke about the possibility of a "Terminator weapons conundrum" and believed that some of America adversary had prepared to create artificial intelligence-like weapons. He also said that the Department of Defense was working with experts on ethics in order to study the threat posed by this kind of weapon and what will happens when technology is brought into the execution of warfare.

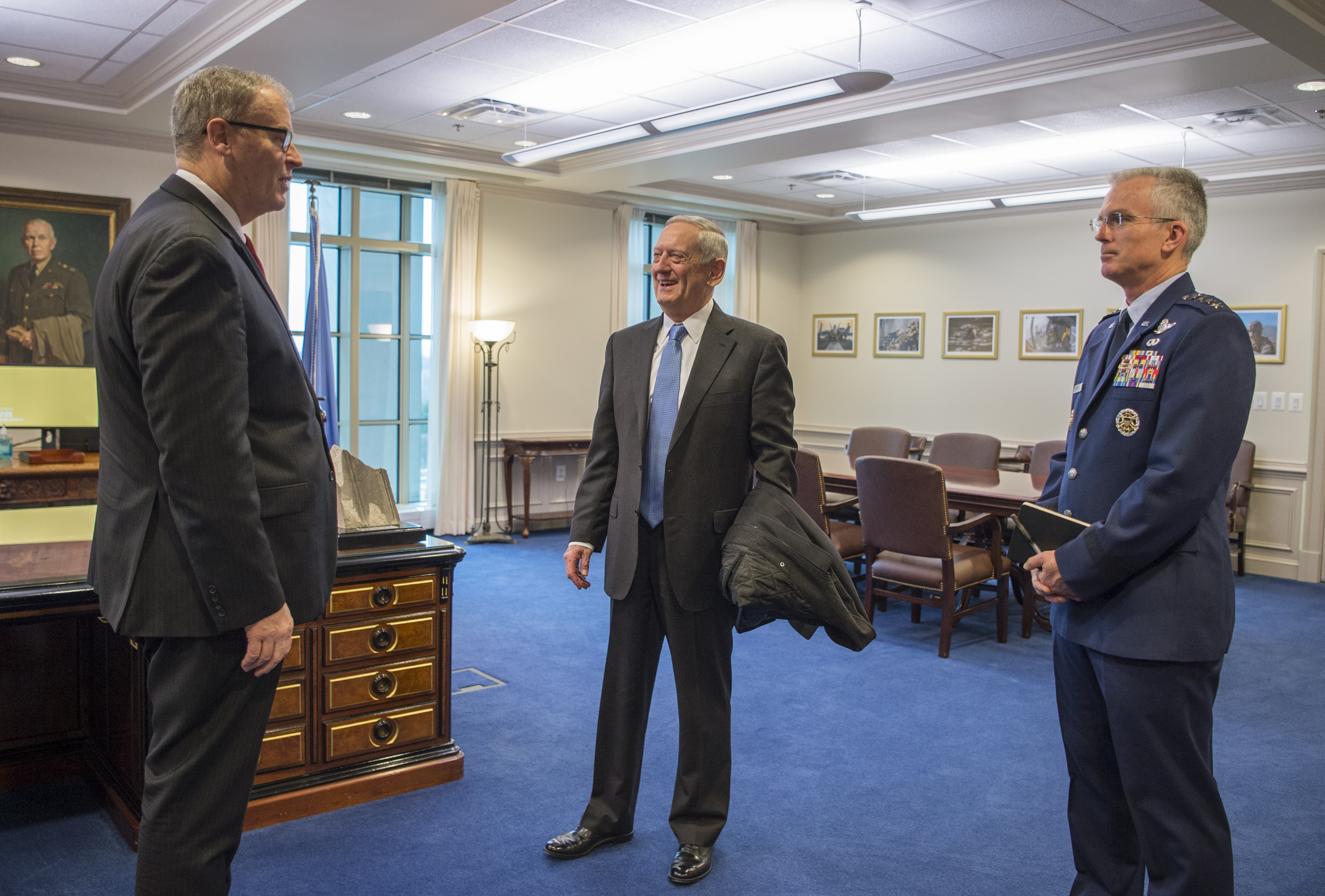
Selva with Secretary of Defense General James Mattis and Deputy Secretary of Defense Bob Work at the Pentagon on 21 January 2017

As vice chairman of the Joint Chiefs of Staff (JCS), which was in charge of Joint Requirement Oversight Committee and Defense Acquisition Board, Selva reasserted the need of increasing defense budget for 2017. During testimony to the Senate Armed Services Committee, Selva defended the 2017 budget request and acknowledged the challenges to come. Selva also made clear that the Joint Chiefs were satisfied with the 2017 budget proposal during the Senate hearing.

On 16 May 2017, Selva was renominated for a second term as vice chair of the JCS

In March 2017, Selva told the US Congress that Russia had deployed a missile barred by treaty and had launched it in order to scare their neighboring NATO members countries. According to Selva, the Russian act violated the 1987 Intermediate-Range Nuclear Forces Treaty. He was also concerned over China's military buildup in the Asian Pacific and emphasized their development of capabilities with the potential to compete United States military-technological advantages. Selva also said that the Chinese have shown its willingness to exploit their economy as leverage to advance their regional political objectives and as China's military modernization continues, the United States and its allies and partners nations will continue to balance the challenge and threat that China's carries. He further noted that a long-term and sustained presence is critical in order to demonstrate that the United States is committed to the Asia Pacific region, and emphasized that the United States will continue to develop a security network through multilateral partnership and will continue to develop capabilities to counter China's threat.

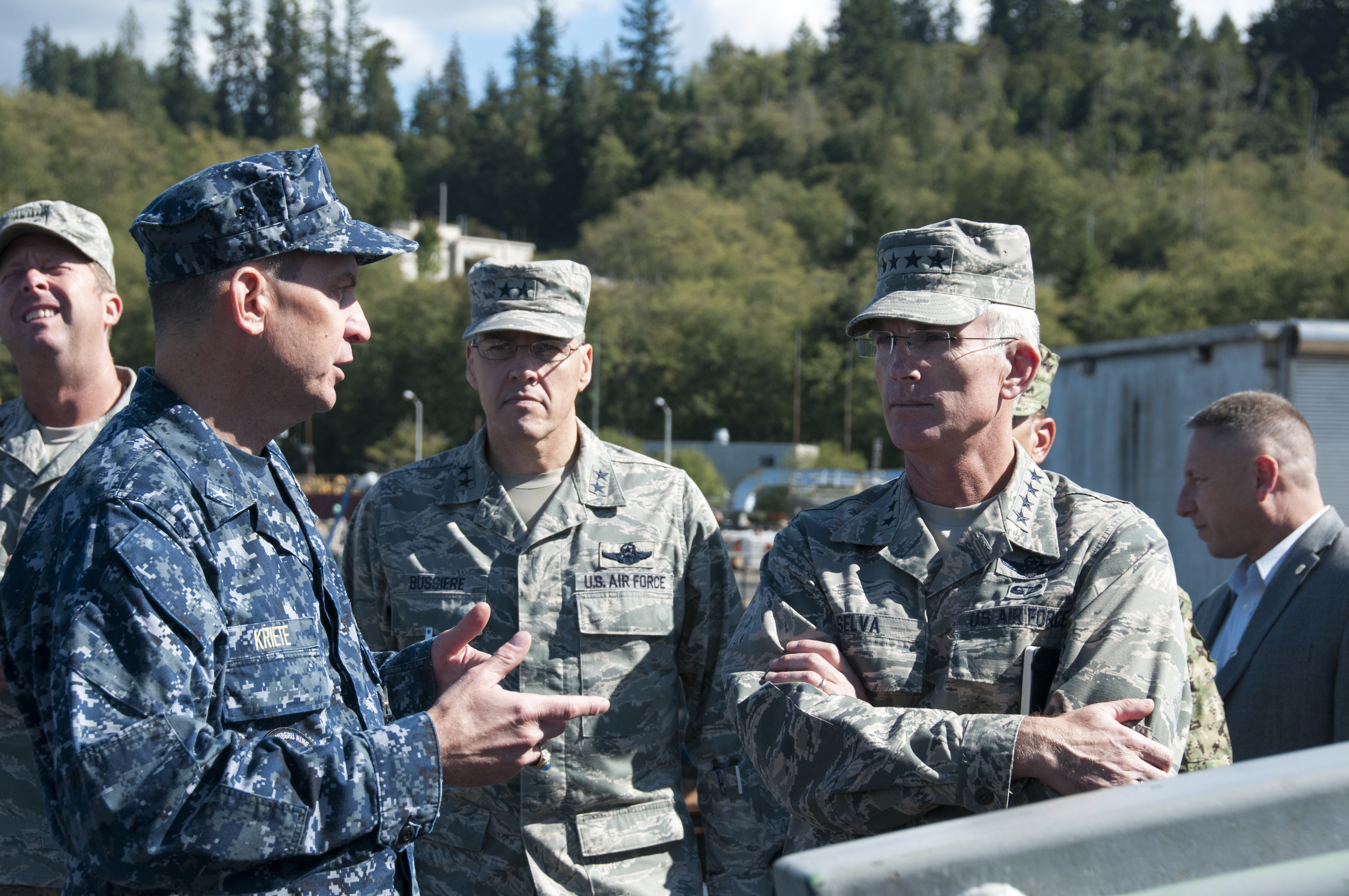
Selva visiting Naval Base Kitsap-Bangor on 21 September 2015

In July 2017 following the increasing tension between the United States and North Korea, Selva stated that North Korea could become a nuclear arms proliferator. He stated that although there is no evidence that North Korea had engaged in proliferation of their long-range ballistic missile technology, it was clear that North Korea have proliferated every other weapons system that they've ever invented. In October 2018 Selva stated that the Pentagon was planning to use satellites in order to defend the United States against enemy hypersonic weapons such as intercontinental ballistic missiles. The remarks came one day after the Defense Department revealed their final steps toward creating the new military branch Space Force, which include establishing a Space Development Agency.

In June 2019, when the tension between the United States and Iran increased following the attack of an oil tankers in the Gulf of Oman, Selva warned that Iran should steer clear of United States interests. But he said that the United States wouldn't mount a unilateral military response against Iran unless U.S. forces or interests within the region are targeted. According to Selva, any military response to the tanker attacks would require an international consensus before military force was used.

In July 2019, Selva retired. However, some stated that Selva would most likely become Chairman of the Joint Chiefs of Staff if Hillary Clinton won the 2016 presidential election. A week before Selva was scheduled to retire, he conducted one of the United States Air Force's most famous traditions, a fini-flight, by flying a United States Air Force Gulfstream C-37 to Joint Base Andrews. Selva's retirement ceremony was held on July 31, 2019, at Joint Base Andrews and officially retired from 39 years of active duty within the United States Air Force.

== Personal life ==
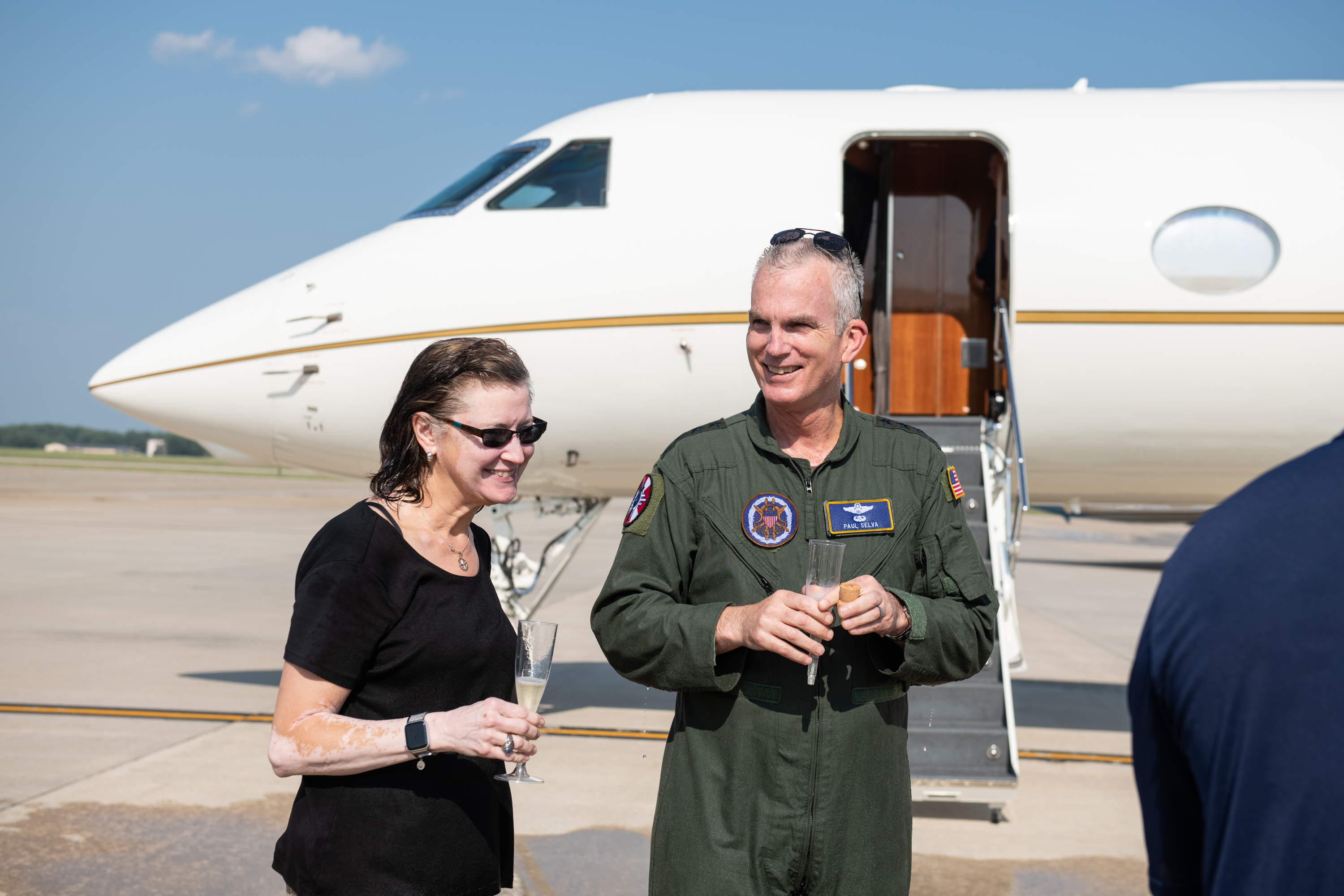
Selva with wife Ricki Selva in 2019

Selva was acknowledged in President Obama's announcement speech on 5 May 2015.

Selva achieved the rank of Eagle Scout in the Boy Scouts of America in 1974.

In an April 5, 2020, phone call to White House Chief of Staff Mark Meadows, Senate Minority Leader Chuck Schumer touted Selva as a potential COVID-19 czar to oversee the production and disbursement of medical equipment.

In October 2020, after having retired, he joined "nearly 500" national security experts and multiple former Trump appointees in endorsing the presidential candidacy of Joe Biden.

In the 2024 United States presidential election, Selva endorsed Kamala Harris.

== Education ==
- 1980 Bachelor of Science degree in aeronautical engineering, U.S. Air Force Academy, Colorado Springs, Colorado
- 1983 Squadron Officer School, Maxwell AFB, Alabama
- 1984 Master of Science degree in management and human relations, Abilene Christian University, Abilene, Texas
- 1992 Distinguished graduate, Air Command and Staff College, Maxwell AFB, Alabama
- 1992 Master of Science degree in political science, Auburn University, Montgomery, Alabama
- 1996 National Defense Fellow, Secretary of Defense Strategic Studies Group, Rosslyn, Alabama

== Assignments ==
1. June 1980 – July 1981, student, undergraduate pilot training, Reese AFB, Texas
2. July 1981 – December 1984, co-pilot and aircraft commander, 917th Air Refueling Squadron, Dyess AFB, Texas
3. January 1984 – December 1988, co-pilot, aircraft commander, instructor pilot, and flight commander, 32d Air Refueling Squadron, Barksdale AFB, Louisiana
4. January 1989 – July 1991, company grade adviser to Commander, Strategic Air Command, later, manager of offensive aircraft systems and executive officer, Deputy Chief of Staff, Plans and Resources, Headquarters Strategic Air Command, Offutt AFB, Nebraska
5. August 1991 – July 1992, student, Air Command and Staff College, Maxwell AFB, Alabama
6. July 1992 – June 1994, instructor pilot and flight commander, 9th Air Refueling Squadron, later, Commander, 722d Operations Support Squadron, March AFB, California
7. June 1994 – June 1995, Commander, 9th Air Refueling Squadron, later, Deputy Commander, 60th Operations Group, Travis AFB, California
8. July 1995 – June 1996, National Defense Fellow, Secretary of Defense Strategic Studies Group, Rosslyn, Virginia
9. July 1996 – August 1998, assistant to the Director, Office of the Secretary of Defense for Net Assessment, the Pentagon, Washington, D.C.
10. August 1998 – July 2000, Commander, 60th Operations Group, Travis AFB, California
11. July 2000 – June 2002, Commander, 62d Airlift Wing, McChord AFB, Washington
12. June 2002 – June 2003, Vice Commander, Tanker Airlift Control Center, Scott AFB, Illinois
13. June 2003 – November 2004, Commander, Tanker Airlift Control Center, Scott AFB, Illinois
14. December 2004 – August 2006, Director of Operations, U.S. Transportation Command, Scott AFB, Illinois
15. August 2006 – June 2007, Director, Air Force Strategic Planning, Deputy Chief of Staff for Strategic Plans and Programs, Headquarters U.S. Air Force, Washington, D.C.
16. June 2007 – October 2008, Director, Air Force Strategic Planning, Deputy Chief of Staff for Strategic Plans and Programs, Headquarters U.S. Air Force, and Director, Air Force QDR, Office of the Vice Chief of Staff, Washington, D.C.
17. October 2008 – October 2011, Assistant to the Chairman of the Joint Chiefs of Staff, Washington, D.C.
18. October 2011 – November 2012, Vice Commander, Pacific Air Forces, Joint-Base Pearl Harbor-Hickam, Hawaii
19. November 2012 – May 2014, Commander, Air Mobility Command, Scott AFB, Illinois
20. May 2014 – July 2015, Commander, U.S. Transportation Command, Scott AFB, Illinois
21. July 2015 – July 2019, Vice Chairman of the Joint Chiefs of Staff, Washington, D.C.

== Flight information ==
- Rating: Command pilot
- Hours flown: More than 3,100
- Aircraft flown: C-5, C-17A, C-141B, C-37, KC-10, KC-135A and T-37

== Effective dates of promotion ==
Rank	Date
Second lieutenant	28 May 1980
First lieutenant	28 May 1982
Captain	28 May 1984
Major	1 January 1990
Lieutenant colonel	1 March 1994
Colonel	1 September 1998
Brigadier general	1 January 2004
Major general	2 June 2007
Lieutenant general	8 October 2008
General	29 November 2012

== Awards and decorations ==
Air Force Command Pilot Badge
Basic Parachutist Badge
Office of the Joint Chiefs of Staff Identification Badge
Office of the Secretary of Defense Identification Badge

Defense Distinguished Service Medal with one bronze oak leaf cluster
Air Force Distinguished Service Medal with two oak leaf clusters
Defense Superior Service Medal
Legion of Merit with oak leaf cluster
Defense Meritorious Service Medal
Meritorious Service Medal with three bronze oak leaf clusters
Air Force Commendation Medal
Air Force Achievement Medal
Joint Meritorious Unit Award with two oak leaf clusters
Air Force Outstanding Unit Award with four oak leaf clusters
Air Force Organizational Excellence Award with four oak leaf clusters
Department of State Distinguished Honor Award
Combat Readiness Medal with two oak leaf clusters
Air Force Recognition Ribbon
National Defense Service Medal with one bronze service star
Armed Forces Expeditionary Medal with service star
Southwest Asia Service Medal with bronze service star
Global War on Terrorism Service Medal
Armed Forces Service Medal
Nuclear Deterrence Operations Service Medal with oak leaf cluster
Air Force Longevity Service Award with silver and three bronze oak leaf clusters
Air Force Longevity Service Award (second ribbon to denote tenth award)
Navy Pistol Marksmanship Ribbon
Air Force Training Ribbon
Legion of Honour, Officer (France)

- On 5 April 2018, Business Executives for National Security (BENS), an industry sponsored non-profit run by titans of industry, presented Selva with the Eisenhower Award.

== Retirement ==
In December 2019, Selva joined the board of The Aerospace Corporation. In December 2020, Selva joined the board of the Center for Strategic and Budgetary Assessments (CSBA), which counts among its contributors many weapons manufacturers and military contractors.

== Gallery ==
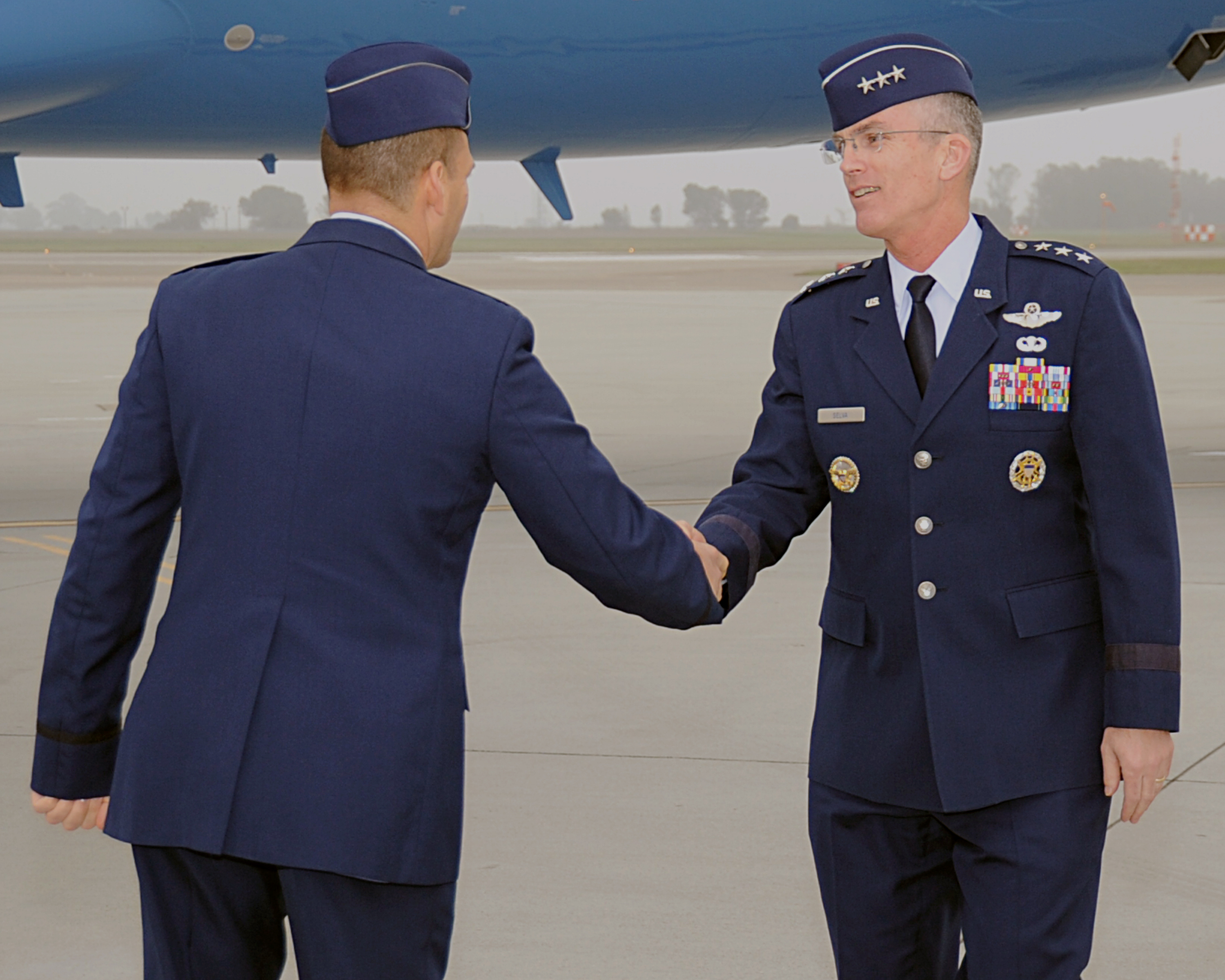
Lieutenant General Selva greeted Colonel James C. Vechery upon arriving at Travis Air Force Base, California during Selva tenure as assistant to the chairman of the Joint Chiefs of Staff on 11 January 2010

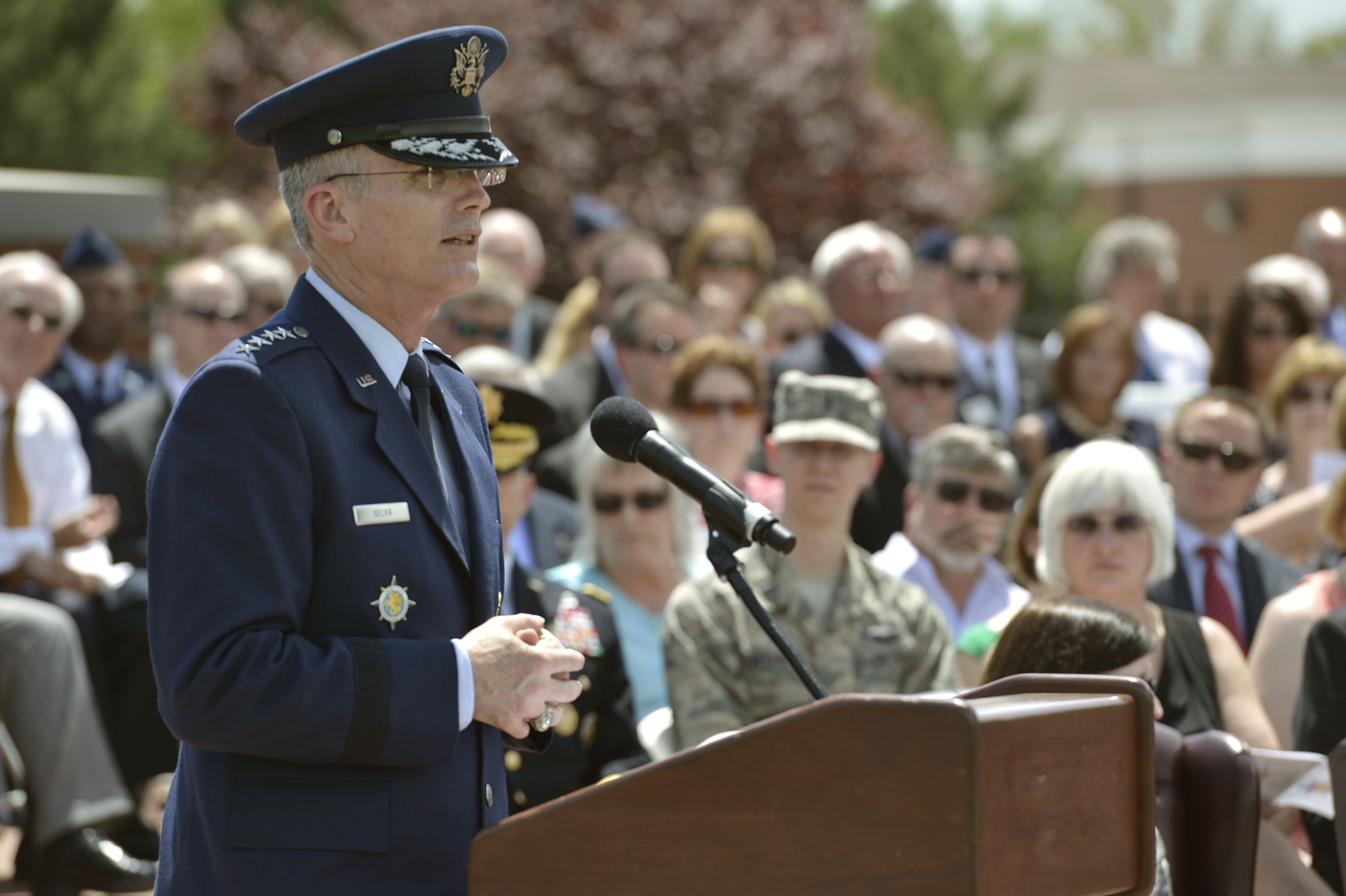
General Selva upon assuming the command of United States Transportation Command, speaks during United States Transportation command change of command ceremony at Scott Air Force Base on 5 May 2014

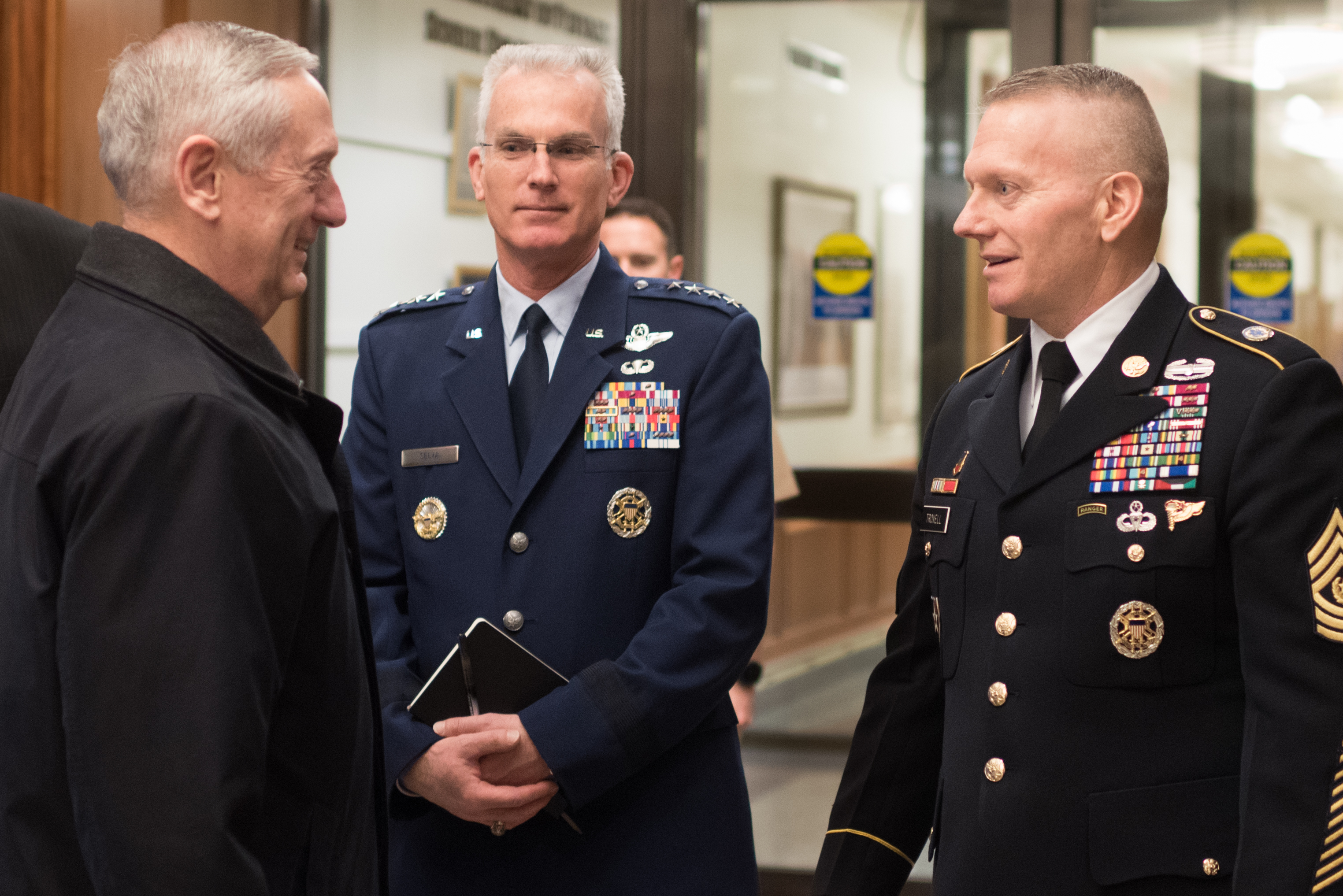
Vice Chairman of the Joint Chiefs of Staff General Selva greeted Secretary of Defense James Mattis with Senior Enlisted Advisor to the Chairman of the Joint Chiefs of Staff Sergeant Major John W. Troxell at The Pentagon on 20 January 2017

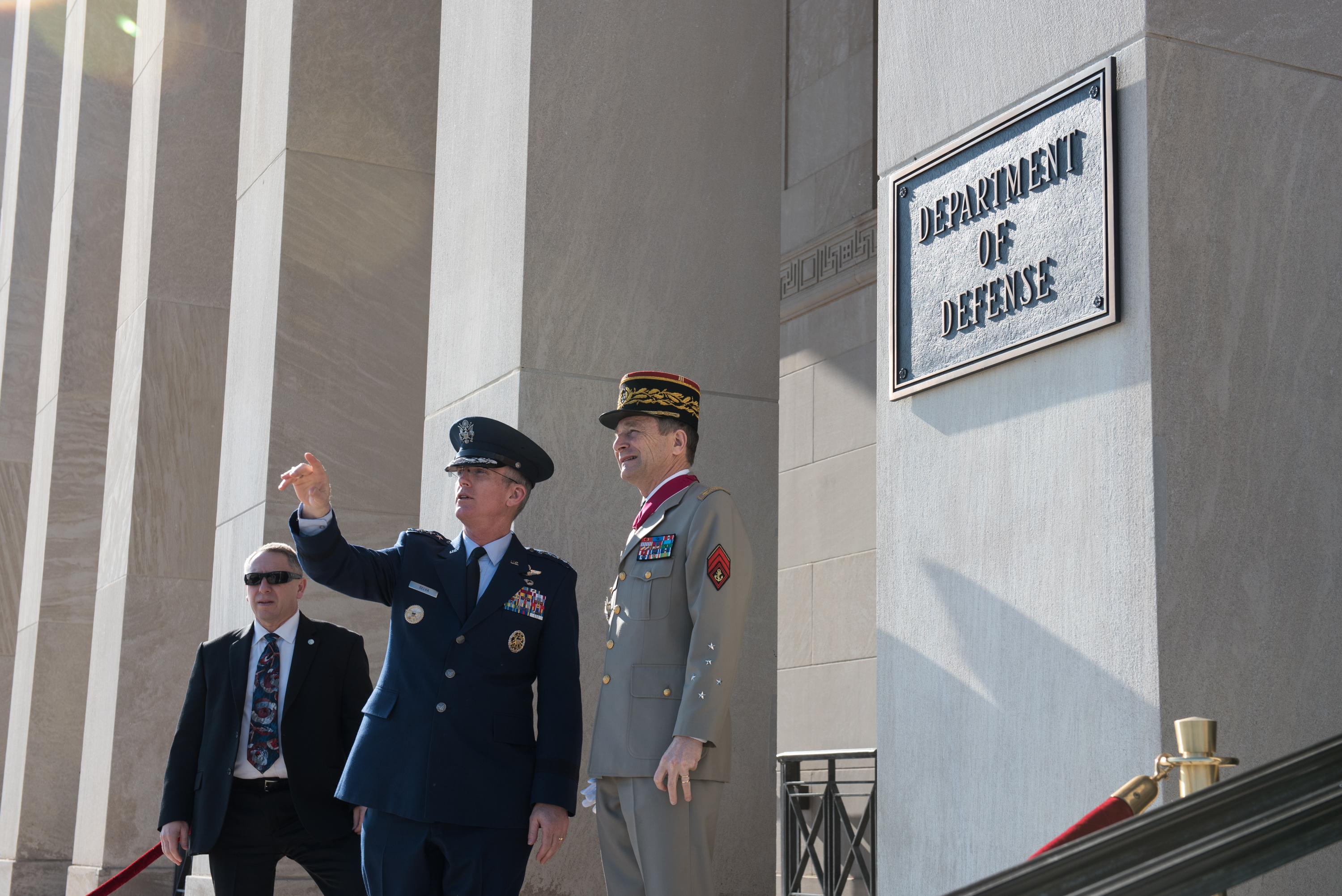
Vice Chairman of the Joint Chiefs of Staff General Selva gave a tour of the Pentagon to French Armed Forces Chief of the Defence Staff General Pierre de Villiers on 6 February 2017

Military offices
Preceded by William M. Fraser III	Assistant to the Chairman of the Joint Chiefs of Staff; 2008-2011	Succeeded by Harry B. Harris Jr.
Preceded by Brooks L. Bash	Vice Commander of the Pacific Air Forces; 2011-2012	Succeeded by Stanley L. Kresge
Preceded by Raymond E. Johns Jr.	Commander of Air Mobility Command; 2012–2014	Succeeded by Darren W. McDew
Preceded by William M. Fraser III	Commander of United States Transportation Command; 2014–2015	Succeeded by Darren W. McDew
Preceded by James A. Winnefeld Jr.	Vice Chairman of the Joint Chiefs of Staff; 2015–2019	Succeeded by John E. Hyten
