= National Security Strategy (United States) =

Document issued periodically by the United States government

The National Security Strategy (NSS) is a document prepared periodically by the executive branch of the United States that lists the national security concerns and how the administration plans to deal with them. The legal foundation for the document is spelled out in the Goldwater–Nichols Act. The document is purposely general in content, and its implementation relies on elaborating guidance provided in supporting documents such as the National Defense Strategy (NDS) or the National Military Strategy.

== Purpose ==
The stated intent of the Goldwater–Nichols legislation is broadly accepted as valid for effective political discourse on issues affecting the nation's security—the Congress and the Executive need a common understanding of the strategic environment and the administration's intent as a starting point for future dialogue. That said, however, it is understood that in the adversarial environment that prevails, this report can only provide a beginning point for the dialogue necessary to reach such a "common" understanding.

The requirement of producing this report along with the budget request leads to an iterative, interagency process involving high level meetings that helps to resolve internal differences in foreign policy agendas. However, "this report was not to be a neutral planning document, as many academics and even some in uniform think it to be. Rather it was ... intended to serve five primary purposes."

1. Communicate the Executive's strategic vision to Congress, and thus legitimize its requests for resources.
2. Communicate the Executive's strategic vision to foreign constituencies, especially governments not on the US's summit agenda.
3. Communicate with select domestic audiences, such as political supporters seeking Presidential recognition of their issues, and those who hope to see a coherent and farsighted strategy they could support.
4. Create internal consensus on foreign and defense policy within the executive branch.
5. Contribute to the overall agenda of the President, both in terms of substance and messaging.

Where the incoming executive team has not formulated a national security strategy, such as an after an election in which foreign policy and defense were not important campaign issues, the process of writing the report can be of immense importance:

Few things educate new political appointees faster as to their own strategic sensings, or to the qualities and competencies of the "permanent" government they lead within executive bureaucracies, than to have to commit in writing to the President their plans for the future and how they can be integrated, coordinated and otherwise shared with other agencies and departments. The ability to forge consensus among these competing views on direction, priorities and pace, and getting "on board" important players three political levels down from the president is recognized as an invaluable, if not totally daunting, opportunity for a new administration.

== History ==
=== George H. W. Bush ===
==== 1991 ====
The National Security Strategy issued on August 1, 1991, officially identified environmental security concerns.

=== George W. Bush ===
==== 2002 ====
2002 National Security Strategy
- Created: 2002; 24 years ago

Official website
- 2002 National Security Strategy at: archives.gov; Wikimedia Commons; Wikisource

The National Security Strategy issued on September 17, 2002, contained the controversial Bush doctrine of pre-emptive war. It also contained the notion of military pre-eminence that was reflected in the first draft of the 1992 Defense Policy Guidance ("Wolfowitz Doctrine"), prepared by Paul Wolfowitz, I. Lewis Libby and Zalmaz Khalilzad for Defense Secretary Dick Cheney. The NSS 2002 repeated and re-emphasized efforts to provide foreign aid to countries moving towards Western-style democracy, with the "ambitious and specific target" of "doubl[ing] the size of the world's poorest economies within a decade."

The Bush doctrine reflected an effort to move from the Cold War doctrine of deterrence to one that could deal with terrorist groups such as al-Qaeda as well as nation-states such as Iraq or Iran.

The document also treated AIDS as a threat to national security, promising efforts to reduce its spread and devastating effects.

==== 2006 ====
Published on 16 March 2006, the final Bush White House NSS said it was “a wartime national security strategy required by the grave challenge we face—the rise of terrorism fueled by an aggressive ideology of hatred and murder.” This NSS was based on two "pillars": "promoting freedom, justice, and human dignity" and "leading a growing community of democracies." The 2006 NSS also discussed environmental destruction, saying it could threaten national security by exacerbating threats such as terrorism. As a result, the NSS says environmental degradation may warrant “full exercise of national power, including… traditional security instruments.” The NSS similarly emphasized the importance of the military in providing relief, especially for natural disasters.

=== Barack Obama ===
==== 2010 ====
On May 26, 2010, President Barack Obama. issued a new Strategy which was called by United Nations ambassador Susan Rice a "dramatic departure" from its predecessor. The Strategy advocated increased engagement with Russia, China and India. The Strategy also identified nuclear non-proliferation and climate change as priorities, while noting that the United States's security depended on reviving its economy. The drafters of the new Strategy made a conscious decision to remove terms such as "Islamic radicalism", instead speaking of terrorism generally.

The 2010 NSS said that in order to defeat al Qaeda and the Taliban in Afghanistan, the United States needs to engage in a large amount of interagency cooperation and communication with the Muslim population in Afghanistan and throughout the world. The objective of the National Security Strategy is to create a stable situation for the world, including those countries struggling with insurgencies. "The most effective long-term measure for conflict and resolution is the promotion of democracy and economic development." In order to promote democracy and economic development communication with the civilian population of the host-nation is essential. The Stability Operations Field Manual states that success depends on a U.S. ability to build local institutions and in the establishment of a legitimate permanent government, which builds trust between the citizens and the counterinsurgency personnel." The National Security Strategy establishes the interagency coordination in order to conduct useful public diplomacy to secure the population in the countries of Afghanistan and Iraq.

==== 2015 ====
On February 6, 2015, Obama issued a new NSS to provide "a vision and strategy for advancing the nation's interests, universal values, and a rules-based international order through strong and sustainable American leadership." This NSS also recognized climate change as an “urgent and growing threat to our national security," reflecting the rhetoric and environmental security concerns that the Pentagon had used in studies and plans since the 1990s.

=== Donald Trump, first term ===
==== 2017 ====
The primary author of the 2017 National Security Strategy was Nadia Schadlow, then-deputy national security adviser. Her work on the document and the inter-agency process that preceded it were well received by foreign policy experts across the political spectrum. Delivered by President Donald Trump on December 18, 2017, the new document named China and Russia as "revisionist powers" while removing "climate change" as a national threat. It also characterized the world as a competitive arena rather than a "community of nations" or "international community" as previous documents had. It mentions AI as an important technology that impacts global competition for the United States (p. 20, 34). NSS-2017 represents a break with past foreign policy doctrine. Brad Patty, an author for the conservative think tank Security Studies Group writes that, "My guess is that members of the Foreign Policy elite will encounter these first pages as a kind of boilerplate, even trite. Notice, though, that those two pages lead directly to a third page that repudiates the whole living body of American foreign policy thought."

About a year later, Schadlow would comment that the NSS had "achieved the state of mattering".

=== Joe Biden ===
==== 2021 ====
In March 2021, President Joe Biden published the 2021 Interim National Security Strategy, which recommitted the United States to the NATO alliance and outlined the country's global priorities, concluding that the United States "must demonstrate that democracies can still deliver for our people. It will not happen by accident – we have to defend our democracy, strengthen it and renew it."

==== 2022 ====
On October 12, 2022, the Biden Administration sent its classified National Security Strategy to Congress. According to an unclassified fact sheet released to the public, the strategy said the U.S. faced two strategic challenges: a post-cold war competition between superpowers and transnational challenges that range from climate change to global health issues. The document said that “the most pressing strategic challenge facing our vision is from powers that layer authoritarian governance with a revisionist foreign policy,” singling out China and Russia as presenting particular but different challenges.

The 2022 National Security Strategy is organized around three points:

1. Invest ambitiously and rapidly in the sources of our national strength.
2. Mobilize the broadest coalition of nations to enhance our collective influence.
3. Shape the rules of the road of the 21st century economy, from technology, to cyber to trade and economics.

=== President Donald Trump, second term ===
==== 2025 ====
2025 National Security Strategy
- Created: 2025; 1 year ago

Official website
- 2025 National Security Strategy at: whitehouse.gov; Wikimedia Commons; Wikisource

On 4 December 2025, President Donald Trump published the 2025 National Security Strategy, which the administration said was "a roadmap to ensure America remains the greatest and most successful nation in human history and the home of freedom on earth". The document placed his America First policies in the forefront, stating "After the end of the Cold War, American foreign policy elites convinced themselves that permanent American domination of the entire world was in the best interests of our country. Yet the affairs of other countries are our concern only if their activities directly threaten our interests". It rejects urging other countries to adopt "democratic or other social change that differs widely from their traditions and histories".

The strategy stated that "The days of the United States propping up the entire world order like Atlas are over". It criticizes migration, stating that "mass migration has strained domestic resources, increased violence and other crime, weakened social cohesion, distorted labour markets, and undermined national security. The era of mass migration must end". It also criticizes free trade and globalism. The document calls for a reorientation of US military efforts towards the Western Hemisphere, where it says the US must be the preeminent power, in order to "control migration, stop drug flows, and strengthen stability and security on land and sea". It asserts a "Trump Corollary" to the Monroe Doctrine to declare that the US will assert political, economic and military power over the Western Hemisphere. It calls to strengthen the US Coast Guard and Navy in order to "thwart illegal and other unwanted migration, to reduce human and drug trafficking, and to control key transit routes in a crisis".

Unlike the 2022 NSS, the 2025 document does not single out China as the greatest challenge to the United States, and frames the relationship almost exclusively in economic terms. Unlike previous documents in the last 30 years, it does not mention China's political system or human rights record. Regarding China, the document calls to "rebalance America's economic relationship with China, prioritizing reciprocity and fairness to restore American economic independence" but also states "trade with China should be balanced and focused on non-sensitive factors" and favors "maintaining a genuinely mutually advantageous economic relationship with Beijing". It states the US wants to prevent war in the Indo-Pacific, and states the US "will build a military capable of denying aggression anywhere in the First Island Chain". The document noted Taiwan's strategic location dividing "Northeast and Southeast Asia into two distinct theatres". Regarding Taiwan, the document also states that "deterring a conflict over Taiwan, ideally by preserving military overmatch, is a priority" and that the US "does not support any unilateral change to the status quo in the Taiwan Strait." Previously, the US stated it opposed any unilateral change to the status quo. It calls the possible control of the South China Sea by any competitor was a related security challenge. The accompanying NDS notably did not mention Taiwan.

The documents calls on the US to urge Japan and South Korea to increase burden sharing, which it said was "necessary to deter adversaries and protect the first island chain". Unlike previous NSS documents, the document does not mention North Korea. The follow-on NDS does mention North Korea, but characterizes it as a threat mainly to South Korea and Japan, with the United States focused on North Korean missiles that can strike the U.S. homeland.

Unlike previous NSS documents, the 2025 document has very little criticism of Russia, which is not mentioned at all as a potential threat. It says that negotiating "an expeditious cessation of hostilities in Ukraine" is in the US's core interest, but states the US "finds itself at odds with European officials who hold unrealistic expectations for the war perched in unstable minority governments, many of which trample on basic principles of democracy to suppress opposition".

The document devotes its most significant criticisms to Europe, saying its economic problems are "eclipsed by the real and more stark prospect of civilizational erasure". It states the "larger issues facing Europe include activities of the European Union and other transnational bodies that undermine political liberty and sovereignty, migration policies that are transforming the continent and creating strife, censorship of free speech and suppression of political opposition, cratering birthrates, and loss of national identities and self-confidence", while noting the "growing influence of patriotic European parties indeed gives cause for great optimism". It also says "Over the long term, it is more than plausible that within a few decades at the latest, certain NATO members will become majority non-European," which would raise "an open question” about whether those countries would continue to view their alliance with the United States in the same way". The document calls for the US to prioritize "cultivating resistance to Europe’s current trajectory within European nations", states that the US wants to "end the perception, and preventing the reality, of NATO as a perpetually expanding alliance" and calls on Europe to "take primary responsibility for its own defense".

The document states the US no longer needs to prioritize the Middle East due to a diversification in energy supplies, which it was the "historic reason" of America's involvement. It also says the US must stop "hectoring" its allies in the Middle East, particularly singling out the "Gulf monarchies".

== See also ==
- National Defense Strategy
- Nuclear Posture Review
- Quadrennial Defense Review
