= National Military Strategy =

Current master plan for the US Armed Forces, more detailed than the Defense Strategy

The National Military Strategy (NMS) of the United States is issued by the chairman of the Joint Chiefs of Staff as a deliverable to the secretary of defense briefly outlining the strategic aims of the armed services. The NMS's chief source of guidance is the National Security Strategy document.

The chairman of the Joint Chiefs of Staff (CJCS), in consultation with the other members of the Joint Chiefs of Staff (JCS), the commanders of the unified combatant commands (CCMDs), the joint staff and the Office of the Secretary of Defense (OSD), prepares the National Military Strategy in accordance with U.S. Code, Section 153, which requires that not later than February 15 of each even-numbered year, the chairman submits to the Senate Committee on Armed Services and the House Committee on Armed Services a comprehensive examination of the national military strategy. This report must delineate a national military strategy consistent with the most recent National Security Strategy prescribed by the president; the most recent annual report of the secretary of defense submitted to the president and Congress; the most recent policy guidance provided by the secretary of defense; and any other national security or defense strategic guidance issued by the president or the secretary of defense.

The NMS report must provide a description of the strategic environment and the opportunities and challenges that affect the United States' national interests and national security. The report must describe the most significant regional threats to US national interests and security as well as the international threats posed by terrorism, weapons of mass destruction, and asymmetric challenges.

After describing the security environment in which military forces will operate, the NMS report must specify the "ends, ways, and means" of the strategy. US national military objectives are the "ends", describing what the armed forces are expected to accomplish. The NMS report describes the relationship of those objectives to the strategic environment, regional, and international threats. Strategic and operational concepts are the "ways" of the strategy and describe how the armed forces conduct military operations to accomplish the specified military objectives. Furthermore, the NMS report must describe the adequacy of capabilities—the "means"—required to achieve objectives within an acceptable level of military and strategic risk.

Military action, by itself, cannot fully accomplish the objectives specified in the president’s National Security Strategy. The NMS must account for the contribution of allies and other partners. Military capabilities are always employed as part of an integrated national approach that employs all instruments of national power—military, information, diplomatic, legal, intelligence, finance, and economic. The NMS report must assess the capabilities, adequacy, and interoperability of regional allies of the United States and or other friendly nations to support US forces in combat operations and other operations for extended periods of time.

The NMS report also includes an assessment of the nature and magnitude of the strategic and military risks associated with successfully executing the missions called for under the strategy. In preparing the assessment of risk, CJCS examines assumptions pertaining to the readiness of forces (in both the active and reserve components), the length of conflict and the level of intensity of combat operations, and the levels of support from allies and other friendly nations.

Before submitting the report to Congress, the chairman provides a copy to the secretary of defense. The secretary provides an assessment and comments on the report and submits these comments to Congress when the report is formally transmitted. Specifically, the secretary of defense must examine areas of risk considered "significant" by the chairman and provide a plan for mitigating those risks. This hierarchy of presentation, first to the secretary of defense and then to Congress, is informed by US Code-10, which was significantly modified by the Goldwater-Nichols Act of 1986. This act also moved the Chairman of the Joint Chiefs of Staff (CJCS) to a strictly advisory placement in the hierarchy of military command and stipulated the composition and delivery, both in written report and direct consultation, by which the Joint Chiefs of Staff are to relay information and advice to the administration. The National Military Strategy interacts with the other joint publications and the current administration's National Security Strategy publication to inform a coherent, militarily informed and civilian representative national strategy.

== History ==
=== 2018 National Military Strategy ===
After the Trump administration released its first National Security Strategy in December 2017 and National Defense Strategy in January 2018, Joint Chiefs Chairman General Joseph Dunford ordered the Joint Staff to update the 2016 National Military Strategy accordingly. In July 2018, Dunford said that an unclassified version of the updated NMS would be given to the public. In December 2018, Dunford approved the updated NMS and sent it to the defense secretary and Congress, according to Col. Patrick Ryder, a spokesman for Dunford. In February 2019, Ryder said that "an unclassified overview of the National Military Strategy is in development and will be released to the public". He did not say when.

The unclassified description of the 2018 National Military Strategy was released on July 12, 2019.

In 2020, the White House determined that during the war on terror, defense contractors filled employee shortages with foreign-born staff.

== See also ==
- Joint Requirements Oversight Council
- National Defense Strategy
- National Security Strategy (United States)
