= Robert T. Herres =

United States Air Force general

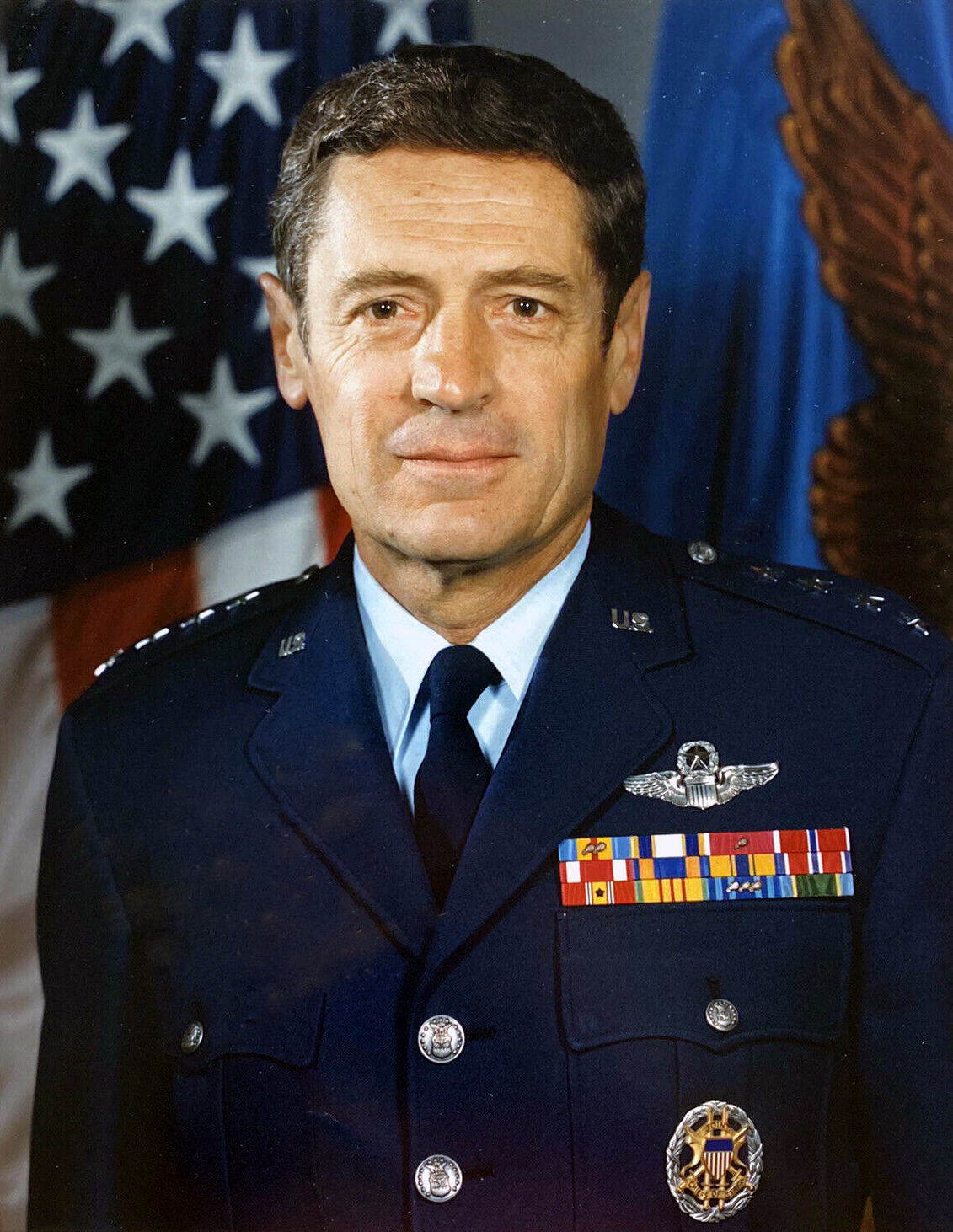
- Official portrait, 1987
- Born: December 1, 1932; Denver, Colorado, United States
- Died: July 24, 2008 (aged 75); San Antonio, Texas, United States
- Burial place: Fort Sam Houston National Cemetery
- Military career
- Allegiance: United States
- Branch: United States Air Force
- Service years: 1954–1990
- Rank: General
- Commands: Vice Chairman of the Joint Chiefs of Staff; United States Space Command; North American Aerospace Defense Command; Air Force Space Command; 8th Air Force; Air Force Communications Command; 449th Bombardment Wing
- Conflicts: Vietnam War
- Awards: Defense Distinguished Service Medal (3); Air Force Distinguished Service Medal (2); Navy Distinguished Service Medal; Legion of Merit (2); Bronze Star Medal; Meritorious Service Medal; Air Medal
- Other work: Chairman, USAA

Robert Tralles Herres (December 1, 1932 – July 24, 2008) was a United States Air Force general who served as the first vice chairman of the Joint Chiefs of Staff.

== Early life and education ==
Herres was born on December 1, 1932, in Denver, where he attended East High School. He was active in the Boy Scouts of America and earned its highest rank, Eagle Scout. He graduated with a Bachelor of Science degree from the United States Naval Academy in 1954. He earned a Master of Science degrees in electrical engineering from the Air Force Institute of Technology and in Public Administration from George Washington University in 1960 and 1965, respectively. He completed Air Command and Staff College in 1965 and the Industrial College of the Armed Forces in 1971.

== Military career ==
After graduating from the United States Naval Academy, Herres chose a commission in the United States Air Force because he saw a better chance at flying duty. After pilot training, Herres' early assignments were in fighter-interceptors, first as a pilot and then as an air electronics maintenance officer. Upon graduation from the Air Force Institute of Technology in 1960, he transferred to Europe, where he served as a technical intelligence analyst and, later, as a flying training supervisor.

Upon completion of Air Command and Staff College in 1965, Herres joined the Air University staff to instruct in weapons employment planning until entering training at the Aerospace Research Pilot School at Edwards Air Force Base, California, completing it in 1966.

In August 1967, Herres was assigned to the Manned Orbiting Laboratory program at the Space Systems Division of Air Force Systems Command in Los Angeles as an astronaut and chief of the Flight Crew Division. After program cancellation in 1969, he returned to the Flight Test Center at Edwards Air Force Base, where he served as deputy chief of staff for plans and requirements. He left Edwards in August 1970 to attend the Industrial College of the Armed Forces.

Herres became vice commander of the 449th Bombardment Wing at Kincheloe Air Force Base, Michigan, in June 1971 and commander the following year. In April 1973 he was assigned to Southeast Asia for duty as commander of the 310th Strategic Wing, U-Tapao Royal Thai Naval Airfield, Thailand. He returned to Kincheloe AFB in September 1973 to resume command of the 449th Bombardment Wing.

From March 1974 to June 1979, Herres served in various aspects of the command and control systems field at Headquarters Strategic Air Command, Electronic Systems Division of Air Force Systems Command and at the Headquarters of the United States Air Force at The Pentagon.

Herres became commander of Air Force Communications Command at Scott Air Force Base, Illinois in June 1979. He later assumed command of SAC's 8th Air Force at Barksdale Air Force Base, Louisiana in July 1981, and became the director for command, control and communications systems for the Joint Chiefs of Staff in October 1982. He was assigned to Peterson Air Force Base, Colorado as commander in chief of the North American Aerospace Defense Command (NORAD) and Aerospace Defense Command, and commander of the Air Force Space Command in July 1984. He was promoted to full general on August 1, 1984, and became the first commander in chief of the United States Space Command upon activation of the unified command in September 1985.

Herres was selected as the first Vice Chairman of the Joint Chiefs of Staff in February 1987.

=== Dates of rank ===
Rank	Date
General	August 1, 1984
Lieutenant general	August 1, 1981
Major general	March 1, 1978
Brigadier general	September 1, 1974
Colonel	November 3, 1969
Lieutenant colonel	February 20, 1967
Major	July 15, 1964
Captain	April 29, 1959
First lieutenant	June 4, 1955
Second lieutenant	June 4, 1954

=== Awards and decorations ===
Command Pilot Badge
Space and Missile Badge
Air Traffic Controller Badge

Senior Missileman Badge
North American Aerospace Defense Command

Defense Distinguished Service Medal with two oak leaf clusters
Air Force Distinguished Service Medal with one oak leaf cluster
Navy Distinguished Service Medal
Legion of Merit with one oak leaf cluster
Bronze Star Medal
Meritorious Service Medal
Air Medal
Air Force Commendation Medal
Organizational Excellence Award
National Defense Service Medal
Vietnam Service Medal
Air Force Longevity Service Award with seven oak leaf clusters
Small Arms Marksmanship Ribbon

== Private sector career ==
Herres later served as chairman of USAA Group, a Fortune 200 company. He was USAA's chairman and CEO from 1993 to 2000 and continued as chairman until May 10, 2002.

During Herres' tenure as chief executive officer, USAA's Internet site was launched; the SSA senior bonus was instituted to reward the loyalty of long-term members; and a formalized way for employees to capture member feedback was created so that USAA could improve its services based on what the membership was saying.

Under his leadership, USAA enhanced its financial management discipline, project management discipline, and began its focus on a one company image. General Herres left the company financially stronger, more efficient, and positioned for future growth.

Herres served as a member of the National Executive Board of the Boy Scouts of America and was awarded the Distinguished Eagle Scout and Silver Buffalo awards.

Military offices
New office	Vice Chairman of the Joint Chiefs of Staff; 1987–1990	Succeeded by David E. Jeremiah
