= David E. Jeremiah =

American admiral (1934-2013)

David Elmer Jeremiah
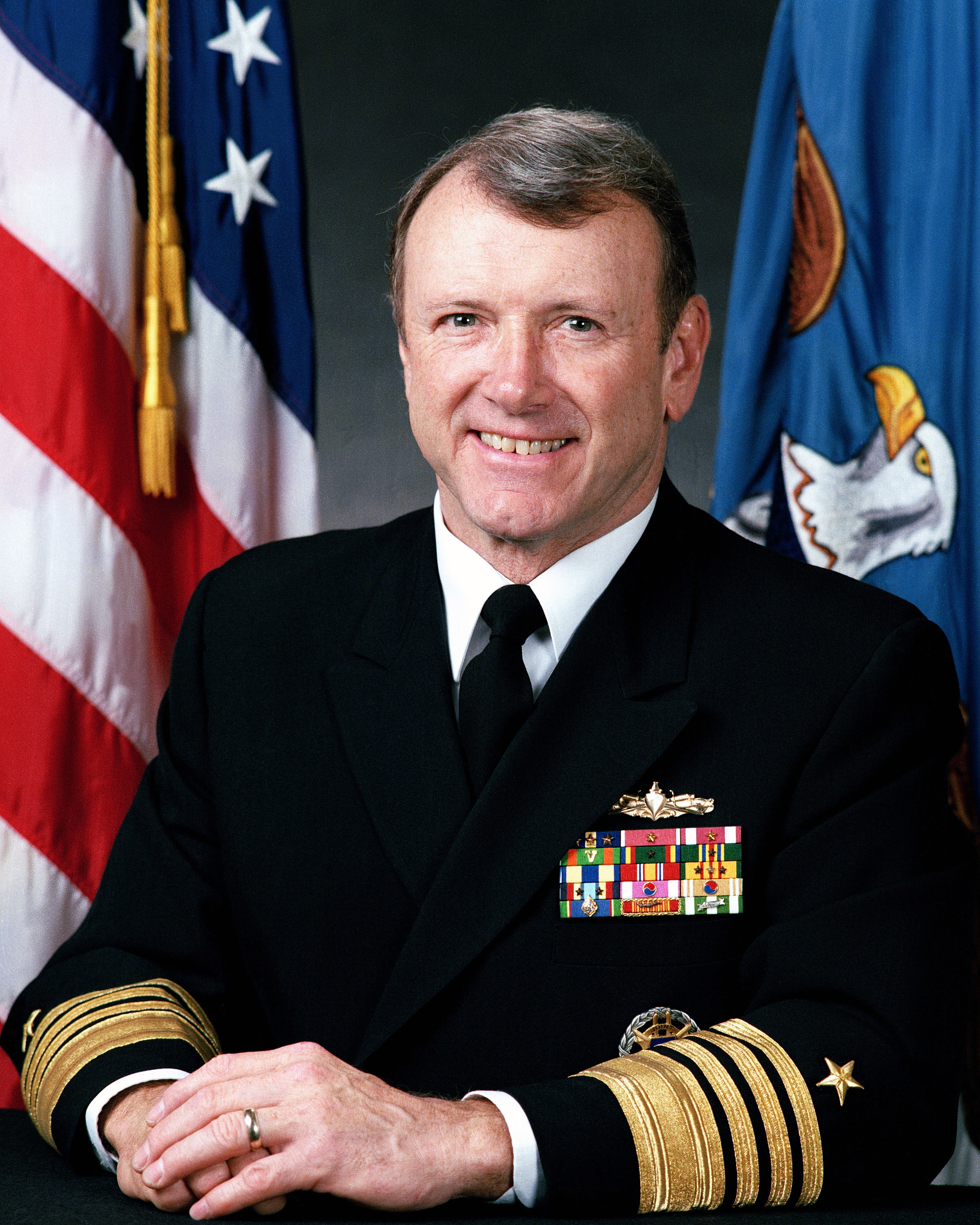
- Official portrait, 1990
- Born: February 25, 1934; Portland, Oregon, US
- Died: October 7, 2013 (aged 79); Bethesda, Maryland, US
- Burial place: Arlington National Cemetery, Virginia
- Military career
- Allegiance: United States
- Branch: United States Navy
- Service years: 1956–1994
- Rank: Admiral
- Commands: Chairman of the Joint Chiefs of Staff (acting); Vice Chairman of the Joint Chiefs of Staff; United States Pacific Fleet; Task Force 60; USS Preble
- Conflicts: Vietnam War; Operation El Dorado Canyon
- Awards: Defense Distinguished Service Medal; Navy Distinguished Service Medal (5); Army Distinguished Service Medal; Air Force Distinguished Service Medal; Coast Guard Distinguished Service Medal; Legion of Merit (2); Meritorious Service Medal (2)
- Other work: investment banking President, Technology Strategies & Alliances Corporation

David Elmer Jeremiah (February 25, 1934 – October 7, 2013) was an American admiral who served as the second vice chairman of the Joint Chiefs of Staff from 1990 to 1994. He was also the acting chairman in 1993. After his retirement from the Navy in February 1994, he worked in the field of investment banking. He served as partner and President, CEO and later Chairman of Technology Strategies & Alliances Corporation, a strategic advisory and investment banking firm engaged primarily in the aerospace, defense, telecommunications, and electronics industries.

== Early life and education ==
Jeremiah was born in Portland, Oregon, on February 25, 1934. He earned a bachelor's degree in Business administration from the University of Oregon and a master's degree in Financial Management from George Washington University. He completed the Program for Management Development at Harvard Business School.

== Career ==
Jeremiah served four years as Vice Chairman of the Joint Chiefs of Staff for Generals Colin L. Powell and John Shalikashvili. He participated in post-Cold War military as Commander in Chief of the United States Pacific Fleet from 1987 to 1991.

He commanded a task force, battle group and destroyer squadron in earlier tours in the Mediterranean. He served as commanding officer of the guided missile destroyer USS Preble (DDG 46) from 1974 to 1976. After being promoted to Captain, he commanded Destroyer Squadron 24 from 1979-1980. As a Rear Admiral he commanded Cruiser-Destroyer Group Eight from August 1984-April 1986. In October 1985 he directed the attempt to capture the hijackers of the MS Achille Lauro and in April 1986 led combat operations against Libya in the Gulf of Sidra. Ashore, Jeremiah served as Director, Navy Program Planning and in financial planning positions on the staffs of the Secretary of Defense and Chief of Naval Operations. In 1987 he was promoted to Admiral and selected as Commander in Chief of the US Pacific Fleet.

In March 1990, he was named the Vice Chairman of the Joint Chiefs of staff under Chairman General Colin Powell.

== Dates of rank ==
Ensign March 30, 1956	Lieutenant (junior grade) September 30, 1957	Lieutenant May 1, 1960
Lieutenant Commander May 1, 1965	Commander September 1, 1969	Captain April 1, 1977
Commodore October 1, 1983	Rear Admiral April 1, 1985	Vice Admiral July 1, 1986
	Admiral October 1, 1987

== Awards and decorations ==
Surface Warfare Officer Insignia
Defense Distinguished Service Medal
Navy Distinguished Service Medal (with three gold stars)
Distinguished Service Medal (Army)
Legion of Merit (with one gold star)
Meritorious Service Medal (with one gold star)
Navy and Marine Corps Achievement Medal (with bronze V device)
Navy Unit Commendation (with bronze star)
Navy Meritorious Unit Commendation (with bronze star)
Navy Expeditionary Medal
National Defense Service Medal
Vietnam Service Medal (with one silver and two bronze stars)
Navy Sea Service Deployment Ribbon (with two bronze stars)
RVN Gallantry Cross Unit Citation with palm and frame
RVN Campaign Medal with 1960- device
Foreign Awards and Decorations
Order of the Crown of Thailand
Order of National Security Merit (Tongil Medal)
Order of National Security Merit (Samil Medal)

== Organizational affiliations ==
Jeremiah was Chairman of the Board of Directors of Wackenhut Services, Inc. and served on the Boards of Directors for Geobiotics, LLC, Todd Shipyards Corporation, ManTech International Corporation and the Board of Trustees for MITRE Corporation and In-Q-Tel and advisory boards for Northrop Grumman Corporation and the Jewish Institute for National Security Affairs.

In addition to his corporate responsibilities, Jeremiah served as a member of the President's Foreign Intelligence Advisory Board, the George Bush Presidential Library Advisory Council and a National Reconnaissance Office Advisory Panel.

== Death ==
Jeremiah died on October 7, 2013, at the Walter Reed National Military Medical Center in Bethesda, aged 79. He was buried at Arlington National Cemetery.

Military offices
Preceded by Robert T. Herres	Vice Chairman of the Joint Chiefs of Staff; 1990–1994	Succeeded by William Owens
Preceded by Colin Powell	Acting Chairman of the Joint Chiefs of Staff; October 1993	Succeeded by John M. Shalikashvili
