= Defense Acquisition Board =

Group within U.S. defense department

The Defense Acquisition Board (DAB) is the senior advisory board for defense acquisitions in the Department of Defense of the United States. The board is chaired by the under secretary of defense for acquisition and sustainment and includes the vice chairman of the Joint Chiefs of Staff, the service secretaries (Secretary of the Army, Secretary of the Navy and Secretary of the Air Force), as well as a number of under secretaries of defense. Initially created in 1989, the DAB plays an important role in the Defense Acquisition System. Members of this board are responsible for approving new phases of major weapon programs, including ensuring that such programs are completed on schedule, within budget, and in accordance with their technical requirements.

== See also ==
- Deputy's Advisory Working Group
- Joint Requirements Oversight Council
