= Vice Chairman of the Joint Chiefs of Staff =

Second highest-ranking military officer in the United States Armed Forces

- Seal of the Joint Chiefs of Staff

- Flag of the vice chairman of the JCS

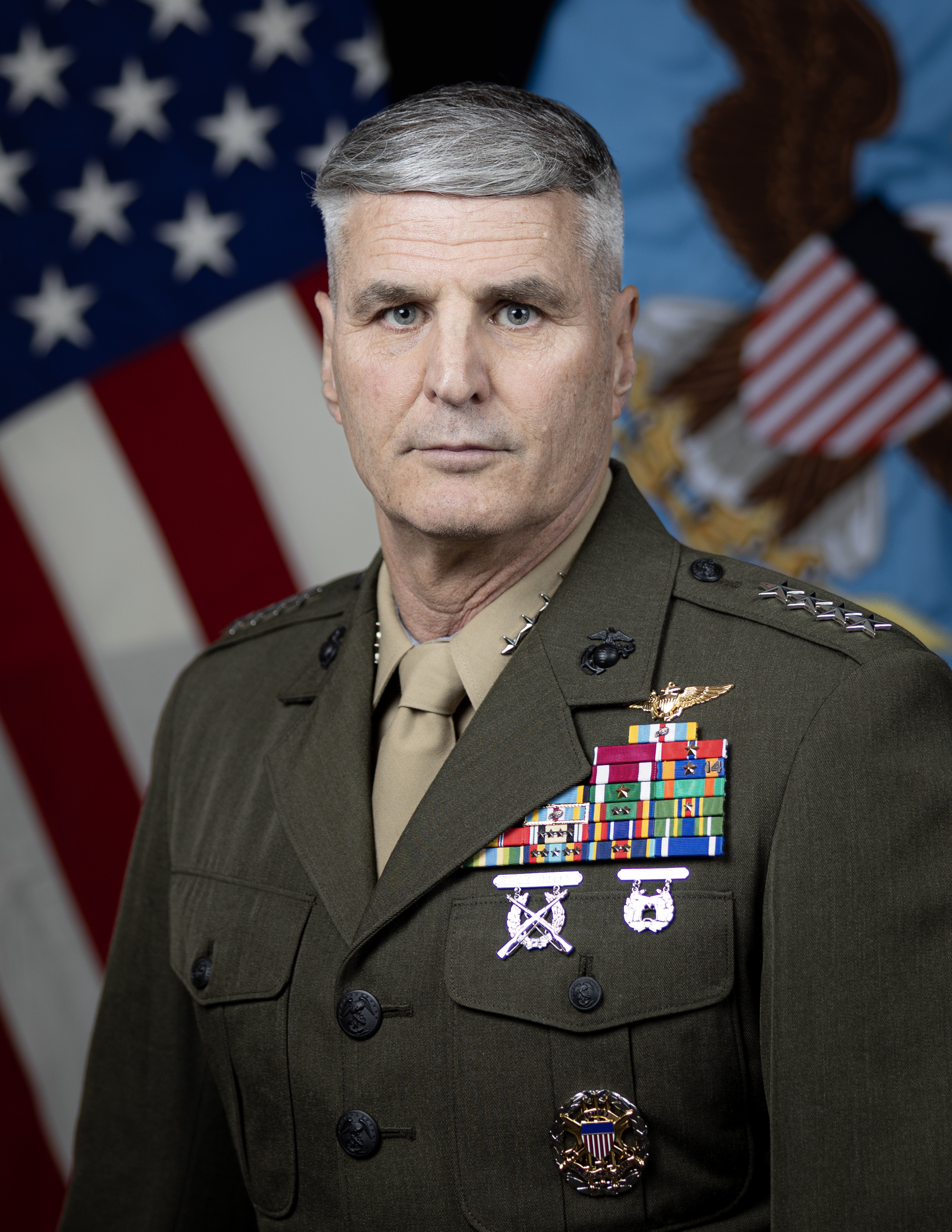
- Incumbent; General Christopher J. Mahoney, USMC since 1 October 2025
- Joint Chiefs of Staff; Department of Defense
- Abbreviation: VJCS
- Member of: Defense Acquisition Board; Joint Chiefs of Staff; Joint Requirements Oversight Council
- Reports to: President; Secretary of Defense; Chairman
- Seat: The Pentagon, Arlington County, Virginia, U.S.
- Appointer: The president with Senate advice and consent
- Term length: 4 years, not renewable
- Constituting instrument: 10 U.S.C. § 154
- Formation: February 6, 1987
- First holder: Robert T. Herres
- Deputy: Director
- Website: www.jcs.mil

The vice chairman of the Joint Chiefs of Staff (VJCS) is, by U.S. law, the second highest-ranking military officer in the United States Armed Forces, ranking just below the chairman of the Joint Chiefs of Staff. The vice chairman outranks all respective heads of each service branch, with the exception of the chairman, but does not have operational command authority over their service branches. The vice chairman assists the chairman in exercising their duties. In the absence of the chairman, the vice chairman presides over the meetings of the Joint Chiefs of Staff and performs all other duties prescribed under 10 U.S.C. § 153 and may also perform other duties that the president, the chairman, or the secretary of defense prescribes.

The 13th and current vice chairman is General Christopher J. Mahoney, who assumed office on 1 October 2025.

== Responsibilities ==
Although the office of Vice Chairman of the Joint Chiefs of Staff is considered to be very important and highly prestigious, neither the vice chairman nor the Joint Chiefs of Staff as a body have any command authority over combatant forces. The operational chain of command runs from the president to the secretary of defense directly to the commanders of the unified combatant commands. The vice chairman's primary duties include: "overseeing joint military requirements, representing the military in National Security Council deputies meetings, and performing other duties as directed by the chairman."

== Appointment and term limitations ==
The vice chairman is nominated by the president for appointment from any of the regular components of the armed forces, and must be confirmed via majority vote by the Senate. The chairman and vice chairman may not be members of the same armed force service branch. However, the president may waive that restriction for a limited period of time in order to provide for the orderly transition of officers appointed to serve in those positions. The vice chairman serves a single four-year term of office at the pleasure of the president, and cannot be reappointed to serve additional terms unless in times of war or national emergency, in which case there is no limit to how many times an officer can be reappointed.

The vice chairman is also not eligible to be appointed for promotion to chairman, or any other four-star position in the armed forces, unless the president determines that it is necessary in the interest of the nation. The vice chairman assumes office on October 1 of every odd-number year, except the assumption of that term may not begin in the same year as the term of the chairman. By statute, the vice chairman is appointed as a four-star general or admiral.

== History ==
The position of vice chairman was created by the Goldwater–Nichols Act of 1986 in order to centralize the military advisory chain of command to the president, the secretary of defense, and to the National Security Council. Originally the vice chairman was not included as a member of the Joint Chiefs of Staff, until the National Defense Authorization Act for Fiscal Year 1992 made him a full voting member. Historically, the vice chairman has served two, two-year terms before the National Defense Authorization Act for Fiscal Year 2017 amended the vice chairman's term length, beginning on January 1, 2021. The same act also set a statutory beginning term date. Prior to that, the position was filled whenever the previous holder left office.

== List of vice chairman ==
General Richard B. Myers and General Peter Pace were later appointed to serve as chairman of Joint Chiefs of Staff from 2001 to 2005 and from 2005 to 2007, respectively.

No.	Portrait	Vice Chairman of the Joint Chiefs of Staff	Took office	Left office	Time in office	Service branch	Chairman
1	Robert T. Herres	General; Robert T. Herres (1932–2008)	February 6, 1987	February 28, 1990 (retired)	3 years, 22 days	U.S. Air Force	William J. Crowe; Colin Powell
2	David E. Jeremiah	Admiral; David E. Jeremiah (1934–2013) (Note: Served as acting chairman from October 1 to October 24, 1993.)	March 1, 1990	February 28, 1994 (retired)	3 years, 364 days	U.S. Navy	Colin Powell; John Shalikashvili
3	William A. Owens	Admiral; William A. Owens (born 1940)	March 1, 1994	February 27, 1996 (retired)	1 year, 363 days	U.S. Navy	John Shalikashvili
4	Joseph Ralston	General; Joseph Ralston (born 1943)	March 1, 1996	February 29, 2000 (appointed SACEUR)	3 years, 365 days	U.S. Air Force	John Shalikashvili; Hugh Shelton
5	Richard Myers	General; Richard Myers (born 1942)	February 29, 2000	October 1, 2001 (appointed JCS chairman)	1 year, 215 days	U.S. Air Force	Hugh Shelton
6	Peter Pace	General; Peter Pace (born 1945)	October 1, 2001	August 12, 2005 (appointed JCS chairman)	3 years, 315 days	U.S. Marine Corps	Richard Myers
7	Edmund Giambastiani	Admiral; Edmund Giambastiani (born 1948)	August 12, 2005	July 27, 2007 (retired)	1 year, 349 days	U.S. Navy	Richard Myers; Peter Pace
8	James E. Cartwright	General; James E. Cartwright (born 1949)	August 31, 2007	August 3, 2011 (retired)	3 years, 337 days	U.S. Marine Corps	Peter Pace; Michael Mullen
9	James A. Winnefeld Jr.	Admiral; James A. Winnefeld Jr. (born 1956)	August 4, 2011	July 31, 2015 (retired)	3 years, 361 days	U.S. Navy	Michael Mullen; Martin Dempsey
10	Paul J. Selva	General; Paul J. Selva (born 1958)	July 31, 2015	July 31, 2019 (retired)	4 years, 0 days	U.S. Air Force	Martin Dempsey; Joseph Dunford
11	John E. Hyten	General; John E. Hyten (born 1959)	November 21, 2019	November 19, 2021 (retired)	1 year, 363 days	U.S. Air Force	Mark Milley
12	Christopher W. Grady	Admiral; Christopher W. Grady (born 1962) (Note: Served as acting chairman from February 21 to April 11, 2025.)	December 20, 2021	September 30, 2025 (retired)	3 years, 284 days	U.S. Navy	Mark Milley; Charles Q. Brown Jr. Dan Caine
13	Christopher J. Mahoney	General; Christopher J. Mahoney	October 1, 2025	Incumbent	342 days	U.S. Marine Corps	Dan Caine

== Vice chairmen by branch of service within the Department of Defense ==
- Army: 0
- Marine Corps: 3
- Navy: 5
- Air Force: 5
- Space Force: 0

== Positional color ==
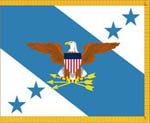
VJCS flag with yellow fringe.

The positional color (flag) of the vice chairman of the Joint Chiefs of Staff is white with a diagonal medium blue strip from upper hoist to lower fly. Centered on the flag is an American bald eagle with wings spread horizontally, in proper colors. The talons grasp three crossed arrows. A shield with blue chief and thirteen red and white stripes is on the eagle's breast. Diagonally, from upper fly to lower hoist are four five-pointed stars, medium blue on the white, two above the eagle, and two below. The fringe is yellow; the cord and tassels are medium blue and white. The design was approved by Secretary of Defense Caspar Weinberger on 20 January 1987.

== See also ==
- Defense Acquisition Board
- Deputy's Advisory Working Group, a policy review panel co-chaired by DEPSECDEF and VJCS
- Joint Requirements Oversight Council
