= Joint Requirements Oversight Council =

Part of the US Department of Defense

Part of the United States Department of Defense acquisition process, the Joint Requirements Oversight Council (JROC) reviews programs designated as JROC interest and supports the acquisition review process in accordance with law (10 U.S.C. § 181). The JROC accomplishes this by reviewing and validating all Joint Capabilities Integration and Development System documents for Acquisition Category I and IA programs, and other programs designated as high-interest. For Acquisition Category ID and IAM programs, the JROC makes recommendations to the Defense Acquisition Board or Information Technology Acquisition Board, based on such reviews. The JROC is chaired by the vice chairman of the Joint Chiefs of Staff, who also serves as the co-chair of the Defense Acquisition Board. The other JROC members are the Vice Chiefs of each military service: Vice Chief of Staff of the Army, Assistant Commandant of the Marine Corps, Vice Chief of Naval Operations, Vice Chief of Staff of the Air Force, Vice Chief of Space Operations, and Vice Chief of the National Guard Bureau.

Moreover, the JROC charters Functional Capabilities Boards. These boards are chaired by a JROC-designated chair and, for appropriate topics, co-chaired by a representative of the Milestone Decision Authority. Functional Capabilities Boards are the lead coordinating bodies to ensure that the joint force is best served throughout the Joint Capabilities Integration and Development System and acquisition processes. The Joint Capabilities Integration and Development System process encourages early and continuous collaboration with the acquisition community to ensure that new capabilities are conceived and developed in the joint warfighting context. The JROC, at its discretion, may review any Joint Capabilities Integration and Development System issues which may have joint interest or impact. The JROC also validates key performance parameters.

== See also ==
- National Security Strategy of the United States
- National Military Strategy (United States)
- Joint Planning Document
- Army Requirements Oversight Council
