= Deputy's Advisory Working Group =

The Deputy's Advisory Working Group (DAWG) was a senior level review panel for the United States Department of Defense. The DAWG was co-chaired by the deputy secretary of defense and the vice chairman of the Joint Chiefs of Staff. The DAWG used to be known as the 'Group of 12'. It represents the most senior panel of civilian and military leaders within the Pentagon. The DAWG was superseded by the Deputy Secretary's Management Action Group (DMAG) on October 6, 2011.
