= Nuclear Posture Review =

US nuclear weapons security policy review

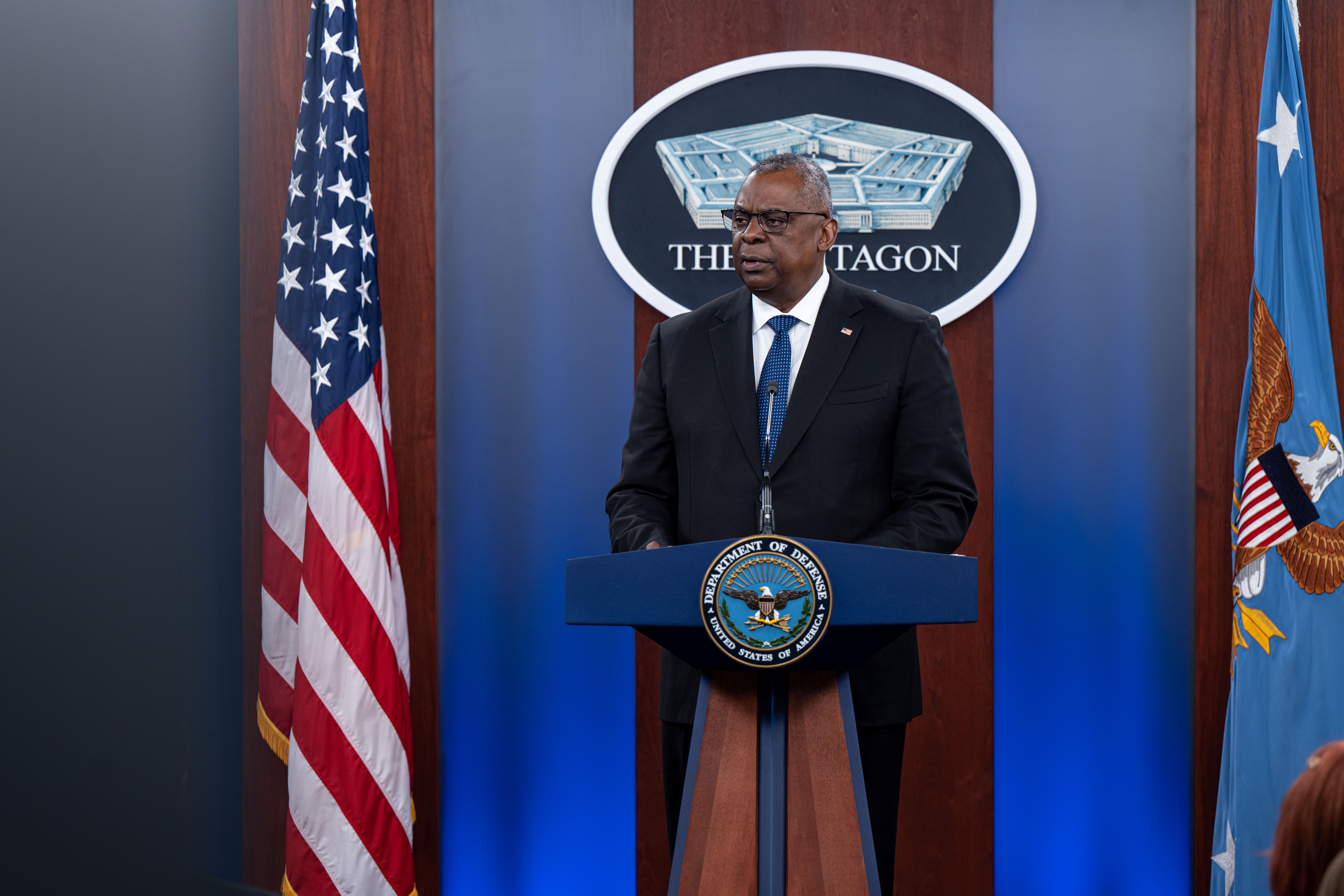
Secretary of Defense Lloyd J. Austin III conducts a press briefing after the release of the unclassified National Defense Strategy, Nuclear Posture Review, and Missile Defense Review at the Pentagon, 27 October 2022

The Nuclear Posture Review (NPR) of the United States is a process "to determine what the role of nuclear weapons in U.S. security strategy should be." NPRs are the primary document for determining U.S. strategy for nuclear weapons and it outlines an overview of U.S. nuclear capabilities, changes to current stockpiles and capabilities, plans for deterrence, and plans for arms control policy with other nations.

== History ==
=== 1994 NPR ===
The first NPR was ordered by Department of Defense (DoD) Secretary Les Aspin, to create a document that comprehensively provides an overview of the United States' nuclear deterrent capabilities in 1993. The document was inspired by the Bottom-Up Review that was also performed by the DoD. The general theme for the first NPR was to lead and hedge threats from abroad. The review was organized around six areas of focus: Role of nuclear weapons, nuclear force structure, nuclear force options, nuclear safety and security, and relationship between US nuclear posture, counter-proliferation policy and threat reduction policy with the former Soviet Union. This review was led by a group of five members, headed by Assistant Secretary of Defense for Nuclear security and Counterproliferation Ashton Carter and Major General John Admire. Owing to the differences in experiences between the two chairs of the review, this led to internal conflict as the NPR was being worked through. After enough discussions, however, the 1994 NPR was approved by President Clinton and published on September 18, 1994.

=== 2002 NPR ===
The next NPR of 2002 was the second of these reviews of US nuclear forces undertaken by the US Department of Defense. The final report is National Security Classified and submitted to the Congress of the United States. The 2002 Nuclear Posture Review also included components requiring the "Pentagon to draft contingency plans for the use of nuclear weapons against at least seven countries, naming not only Russia and the "axis of evil"—Iraq, Iran, and North Korea—but also China, Libya and Syria." Only portions of the report have been released, such as the foreword for the 2002 NPR. In this report, there is a proposal for a new US nuclear triad based on: offensive strike systems, defenses, and a revitalized defense structure. The NPR also calls for the development of new types of nuclear weapons, as well as retaining 2000 deployed strategic nuclear weapons. Critics have argued that this does the opposite of hedging against global threats and inadvertently promotes nuclear proliferation.

The NPR's references to nuclear weapons in the event of a "Taiwan contingency" contributed to debates in China should add conditions to its no-first use policy. Proponents of adding conditions contended that doing so would make China's nuclear deterrence more effective if a "Taiwan contingency" occurred. Ultimately, Chinese leadership rejected the idea of conditioning its no first use policy.

=== 2010 NPR ===
President Barack Obama's 2010 Nuclear Posture Review was preceded by high expectations because of his 2009 speech in Prague, Czech Republic where he prominently outlined a vision of a world without nuclear weapons. His NPR was hoped by observers to make concrete moves toward this goal. The finished 2010 policy renounces development of any new nuclear weapons such as the bunker-busters proposed by the Bush administration, and for the first time rules out a nuclear attack against non-nuclear-weapon states who are in compliance with the Nuclear Non-Proliferation Treaty. This rule specifically excludes Iran and North Korea.

As part of the implementation of the 2010 Nuclear Posture Review, the US Government is reviewing its nuclear deterrence requirements and nuclear plans to ensure that they are aligned to address today's threats. Rose Gottemoeller, US Acting Undersecretary of State for Arms Control and International Security, said in early June 2012 that the United States was considering what forces the United States needed to maintain for strategic stability and deterrence, including extended deterrence and assurance to US Allies and partners. Based on this analysis the United States would develop proposals for potential further reductions in its nuclear stockpile.

=== 2018 NPR ===
With Donald Trump's election came a new nuclear posture review headed by Secretary of Defense James Mattis. The 2018 NPR maintains the need for a nuclear triad in the US defense strategy. There are a variety of options that have been proposed by the 2018 NPR. One of the statements made include a need to close a gap in the nuclear arsenal with low-yield nuclear weapons. This suggests that the US would consider using nuclear weapons if necessary on a smaller-scale regional conflict rather than all-out nuclear war. Other things to note from the 2018 NPR include a need to develop sea-launched cruise missiles (SLCMs) to bolster the SSBN portion of the triad. The review also states the US's intention to not ratify the CTBT and rejects the idea of the Treaty on the Prohibition of Nuclear Weapons. Despite these recommendations and stances, the 2018 NPR is argued to be similar rather than different from previous NPRs. The NPR maintains that nuclear weapons are still meant to serve as a deterrent, which is the goal of these proposed actions to modernize the US nuclear arsenal.

=== 2022 NPR ===
President Joe Biden's 2022 NPR has been described as similar in tone and content to President Obama’s 2010 NPR, but with some significant adjustments because of developments in Russia and China. While it resisted calls to add new warheads or delay retirements, it did not adopt the "sole purpose" policy Biden had favored during his 2020 Presidential campaign. Like previous NPRs, it affirmed that the roles of U.S. nuclear weapons are to deter attacks, assure allies and partners, and achieve objectives if deterrence fails.

== See also ==
- Doctrine for Joint Nuclear Operations
- Mutual assured destruction
- Nuclear utilization target selection
- Nuclear weapon
- Prompt Global Strike
- Single Integrated Operational Plan
