= Stephanie Barna =

American lawyer

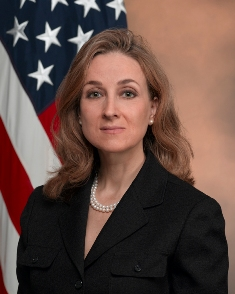

Acting United States Under Secretary of Defense for Personnel and Readiness
- In office July 30, 2018 – October 22, 2018
- President: Donald Trump
- Preceded by: Robert Wilkie
- Succeeded by: James N. Stewart (acting)

Acting Assistant Secretary of Defense for Manpower and Reserve Affairs
- In office January 20, 2017 – July 30, 2018
- President: Donald Trump
- Preceded by: Todd A. Weiler
- Succeeded by: James N. Stewart

Acting Assistant Secretary of Defense for Readiness and Force Management
- In office June 14, 2014 – April 8, 2016
- President: Barack Obama
- Preceded by: Frederick E. Vollrath
- Succeeded by: Dan Feehan (acting)

Personal details
- Born: Stephanie Anne Barna
- Education: Washington & Jefferson College; University of Pittsburgh

Military service
- Allegiance: United States
- Branch/service: United States Army
- Years of service: 1989–2011
- Rank: Colonel
- Awards: Legion of Merit; Defense Meritorious Service Medal

Stephanie Anne Barna is an American military officer, attorney, and civil servant. After Robert Wilkie's appointment as acting United States Secretary of Veterans Affairs by Donald Trump in 2018, Barna began performing the duties of Under Secretary of Defense for Personnel and Readiness. She served as general counsel to the majority staff of the United States Senate Committee on Armed Services.

Barna is a Fellow of the National Academy of Public Administration.
