= Jessica L. Wright =

American politician

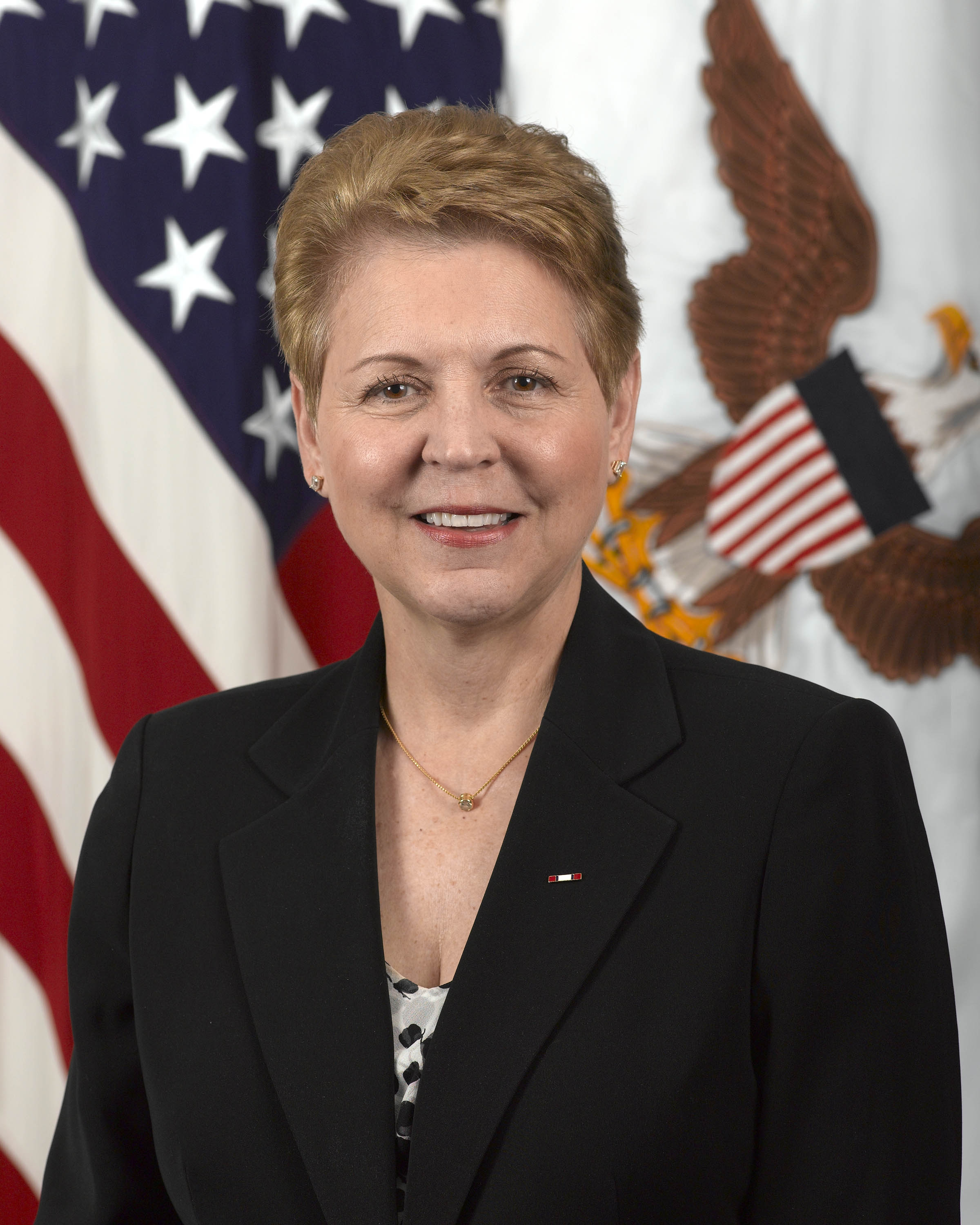

Under Secretary of Defense for Personnel and Readiness
- In office January 1, 2013 – March 31, 2015; Acting: January 1, 2013 – June 25, 2014
- President: Barack Obama
- Preceded by: Erin C. Conaton
- Succeeded by: Robert Wilkie

United States Assistant Secretary of Defense for Reserve Affairs
- In office May 24, 2012 – December 31, 2012
- President: Barack Obama
- Preceded by: Dennis M. McCarthy
- Succeeded by: Todd A. Weiler (2016)

50th Adjutant General of Pennsylvania
- In office October 13, 2004 – October 29, 2010
- Governor: Ed Rendell
- Preceded by: William B. Lynch
- Succeeded by: Stephen Sischo

Personal details
- Born: Jessica Lynn Garfola; November 2, 1952 (age 73) Monessen, Pennsylvania
- Spouse: Charles Edwin Wright
- Education: Alderson–Broaddus College; Webster University; U.S. Army War College

Military service
- Allegiance: United States
- Branch/service: United States Army (National Guard)
- Years of service: 1975–2010
- Rank: Major general
- Awards: Distinguished Service Medal; Legion of Merit; Meritorious Service Medal

Jessica Lynn Wright (née Garfola; born November 2, 1952) was the Under Secretary of Defense for Personnel and Readiness of the United States Department of Defense.

In 2020, she was inducted into the U.S. Army Women's Foundation Hall of Fame.

== Biography ==
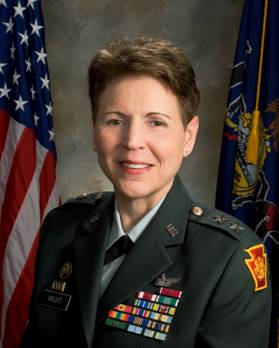
Major General Wright

Wright retired at the end of March 2015, and was succeeded by Brad Carson as Acting Under Secretary of Defense for Personnel and Readiness. Laura Junor is the Principal Deputy Under Secretary of Defense for Personnel and Readiness.

Wright previously served as the Adjutant General of Pennsylvania for the Pennsylvania Department of Military and Veterans Affairs.

In 2020, Wright was inducted into the U.S. Army Women's Foundation Hall of Fame.
