= Carlisle Ford Runge =

American economics professor

Carlisle Ford Runge (born 1953) is a professor of applied economics and law at the University of Minnesota.

Born in Madison, Wisconsin in 1953, his parents were Carlisle Piehl Runge (1920–83), a Professor of Law at the University of Wisconsin, and Elizabeth Eshleman Runge (1922–64), a television journalist. Both were active in Democratic politics and early opponents of Senator Joseph McCarthy (R-WI). Runge's mother died in 1964 of complications from multiple sclerosis. In 1966, his father married Eleanor Vilas Runge (1932–2012).

== Early life and education ==
Runge's childhood was spent in Madison, Wisconsin. From 1961–62, the family relocated to Washington, D.C., while his father served as Assistant Secretary of Defense to President John F. Kennedy. After graduating from high school in Madison in 1970, he attended the University of North Carolina at Chapel Hill. As a North Carolina Fellow, he worked as an intern (1972) for Senator Gaylord Nelson (D-WI). After a year at the (now) Sanford Institute of Public Policy at Duke University, where he met his future wife, Susan Mackenzie Runge (married 1982), he received a Rhodes Scholarship and attended New College, Oxford, from 1975 to 1977, finishing a BA and MA in Politics and Economics. During 1976, he worked on the staff of the House Committee on Agriculture under Chairman and later House Speaker Thomas S. Foley. In 1977, he served as speechwriter to Allard K. Lowenstein after Lowenstein (1929–1980) was appointed U.S. Ambassador to the UN Human Rights Commission in Geneva by President Jimmy Carter. He returned to Madison from 1977–81 to study for his doctorate in Agricultural and Applied Economics at the University of Wisconsin–Madison, and received his PhD in 1981 with a thesis: "Institutions and common property externalities: the assurance problem in economic development".

== Academic career ==
Runge's first academic appointment was at the University of North Carolina-Chapel Hill in Public Policy from 1981–82. In 1982 he received a Science and Diplomacy Fellowship from the American Association for the Advancement of Science (AAAS), working in United States Agency for International Development on science and technology issues in developing countries, especially in Africa. In 1990, he was appointed to the National Academy of Sciences Study Group on Common Property Resources (the subject of his dissertation), working with Daniel W. Bromley (his dissertation supervisor) and Elinor Ostrom, who would win the 2009 Nobel Prize in Economics for her work on common property.

In 1983, Runge was appointed an Assistant Professor in the Department of Applied Economics at the University of Minnesota, working with G. Edward Schuh (1932–2009), Vernon W. Ruttan (1924–2008) and Harlan Cleveland (1918–2008) and directing the Future of the North American Granary Project at the Humphrey School of Public Affairs. In 1985, he served as Chairman of the Governor's Farm Crisis Commission, structuring recommendations on farm credit and land markets in Minnesota, during the farm financial crisis of the 1980’s.

== Professional involvement outside academia ==
Runge has been involved in a number of projects outside the university setting.

From 1987-88, he served as an International Affairs Fellow and Ford Foundation Economist and was posted to the Office of the U.S. Trade Representative (USTR) as Special Assistant to the Deputy U.S. Trade Representative in Geneva, Switzerland during the Uruguay Round of Multilateral Trade Negotiations (MTN).

From 1988–91, he served as the first director of the Center for International Food and Agricultural Policy (CIFAP) at the University of Minnesota. During 1991, he did research on European trade reform and environmental policy as a Fulbright Research Fellow, visiting at the Universities of Padova (Italy) and Dijon (France). From 2004–2007, he served for the second time as Director of CIFAP.

In 1992, Iowa State University Press published Reforming Farm Policy: Toward a National Agenda, which he wrote with Willard W. Cochrane (1914–2012). In 1994, the Council on Foreign Relations published Freer Trade, Protected Environment: Balancing Trade Liberalization and Environmental Interests. In 2003, Johns Hopkins University Press published, Ending Hunger in Our Lifetime: Food Security and Globalization. In 2007, Runge published “How Biofuels May Starve the Poor” in Foreign Affairs. In 2010, he co-authored “Against the Grain: Why Failing to Complete the Green Revolution Could Bring the Next Famine,” also in Foreign Affairs. In 2014, he co-authored “Global Agriculture and Carbon Trade-offs,” in the Proceedings of the National Academy of Sciences. His current research is focused on the neuroscience of economic decisions over time.

== Personal and family Life ==
Since 1994, he has lived in Stillwater, Minnesota. Since 1985, the family has owned a small farm enrolled in the Conservation Reserve Program (CRP) in Dunn County, Wisconsin and a family summer home on the Bois Brule river in Wisconsin.
