= William B. Lynch =

American politician (born 1943)

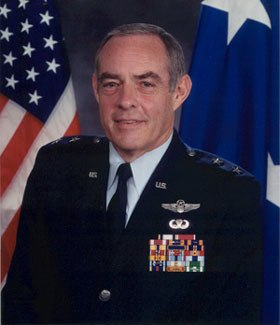

49th Adjutant General of Pennsylvania
- In office March 23, 1999 – October 10, 2004
- Governor: Tom Ridge; Mark Schweiker; Ed Rendell
- Preceded by: James W. Mac Vay
- Succeeded by: Jessica L. Wright

Personal details
- Born: William Berger Lynch; January 10, 1943 (age 83) New York, New York, U.S.
- Spouse: Kathleen Killmeyer
- Education: Brown University; Ohio Northern University; National War College

Military service
- Allegiance: United States
- Branch/service: Pennsylvania Air National Guard
- Years of service: 1965–2004
- Rank: Major general
- Battles/wars: Vietnam War
- Awards: Distinguished Service Medal; Legion of Merit; Meritorious Service Medal

William Berger Lynch (born January 10, 1943) is a former Adjutant General of Pennsylvania for the Pennsylvania Department of Military and Veterans Affairs.
