= Reserve Officers Association =

US veterans service organization

ROA (d/b/a Reserve Organization of America)
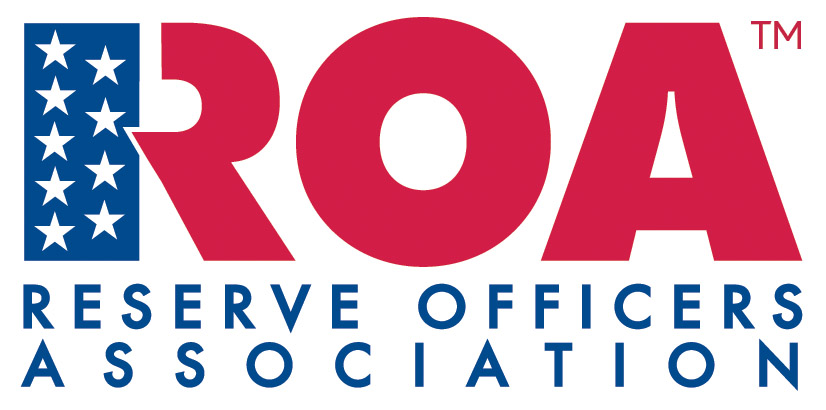
- ROA logo
- Formation: 1922; Chartered by Congress in 1950
- Type: 501(c)(19), veterans' organization
- Tax ID no.: 53-0132450
- Headquarters: One Constitution Ave. NE, Washington, DC
- Members: ~63,000
- Revenue: $1,233,348 (2023)
- Website: www.roa.org

The ROA (d/b/a Reserve Organization of America) is a professional association of commissioned officers, non-commissioned officers, former officers, enlisted and spouses of the uniformed services of the United States, primarily with the Reserve and National Guard.

Founded in 1922 and under congressional charter since 1950, Reserve Officers Association of the United States (ROA), now doing business as the Reserve Organization of America, advocates for adequate funding of equipment and training requirements, recruiting and retention incentives, and employment rights for all members of the Reserve. It also advises and educates the Congress, the president, and the American people on national security.

== Formation ==
The ROA was founded on October 2, 1922, when several hundred officers, many of them combat veterans of World War I, first gathered with General of the Armies John J. "Black Jack" Pershing at the Willard Hotel in Washington, D.C., to formally establish a new organization.

From 1924 until 1938, the ROA was headquartered in The Lee House at 1653 Pennsylvania Avenue NW, it moved in 1938 only a block away from the original headquarters.

Between the World Wars, the right of the Reservist to appear before Congress in support of appropriations and matters affecting the national defense was established. Also during this time, Reserve programs, which were to prove invaluable in the mobilization period of 1941 and 1942, became established on the foundations laid by the citizen-soldiers who had served in World War I.

During World War II, the Association became inactive "for the duration" as its members went off to war. The lease on the headquarters at 1762 Pennsylvania Avenue NW was given up during World War II and was signed again in 1945. ROA was reactivated in 1946, and in 1948, Reserve Officers of the Naval Services (RONS) merged with ROA. The Marine Corps and Coast Guard entered at about the same time. When law created a separate Department of the Air Force, for the first time the nation had, in ROA, a Reserve association embracing all the Services.

In 1947, the ROA purchased the property at 2157 Connecticut Avenue SE where the headquarters remained until 1963 when it was sold, and the town house at 333 Pennsylvania Avenue SE was leased.

Public Law 595 of the 81st Congress, second session, was "An Act to Incorporate the Reserve Officers Association of the United States." This act established the objective of ROA: "...support and promote the development and execution of a military policy for the United States that will provide adequate National Security." President Harry S. Truman, one of the early members of ROA, signed the charter on June 30, 1950.

On 7 March 1966, the ROA purchased the property at 1 Constitution Avenue NE for $314,000 and on 11 October 1966 construction of the new headquarters began.

On 22 February 1968, construction was completed and the new headquarters was dedicated the Minuteman Memorial Building. The building has conference rooms, a ballroom overlooking the Capitol on the fifth-floor, and it is home to the Top of the Hill Banquet and Conference Center. The Minuteman Memorial Building is a memorial and tribute to Reserve Officers with its Wall of Gold containing more than 8,000 inscribed names.

In 1991, retired Major General Robert C. Hope held the position of President of the ROA Retired Colonel James R. Sweeney II took over as president in 2013.

On 8 December 2014, retired Army Major General Jeffery E. Phillips took on the position of executive director of the ROA.

== Basic facts ==
- ROA membership is open to all federally commissioned officers, warrant officers, non-commissioned officers, enlisted and their spouses, from the Air Force, Army, Coast Guard, Navy, and Marine Corps, plus the U.S. Public Health Service and the National Oceanic and Atmospheric Administration.
- ROA holds a congressional charter, and is established in public law as a corporation to support and promote military policies that will provide adequate national security.
- ROA members are major participants in the Interallied Confederation of Reserve Officers (CIOR), Interallied Confederation of Reserve Medical Officers (CIOMR), and Pan American Union of Reserve Officers of the Armed Forces (UPORFA), international organizations that hold annual events in Europe and South America. All national Reserve officer organizations of NATO have joined CIOR since its founding in 1948.

== Advocacy and legislative priorities ==
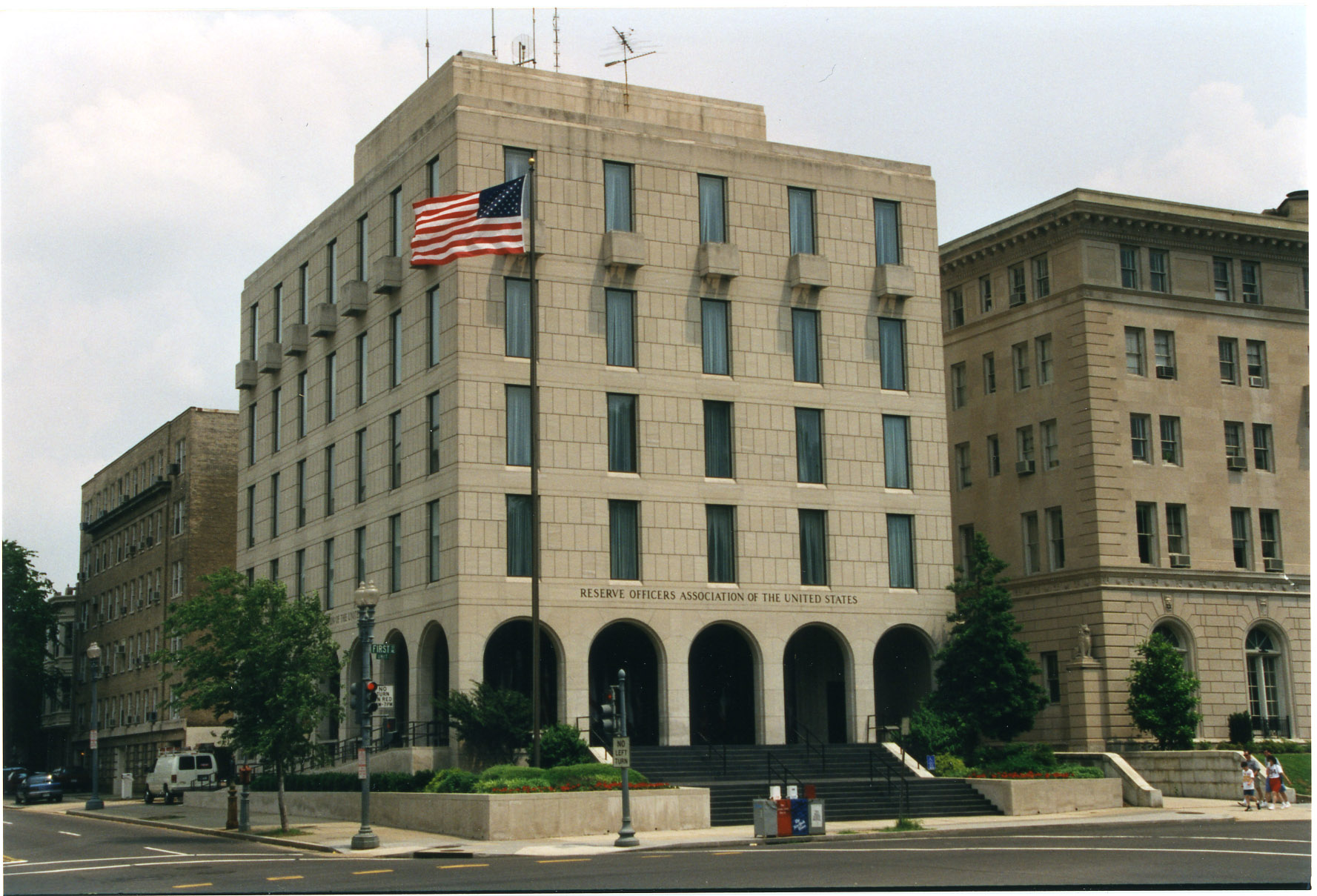
ROA Headquarters, Minuteman Memorial Building, Washington, DC

ROA's legislative priorities, largely shaped by the requirements of the War on Terrorism, are:

- Reset the whole force to include fully funding equipment and training for the National Guard and Reserves.
- Provide adequate resources and authorities to support the current recruiting and retention requirements of the Reserves and National Guard.
- Support warriors, families, and survivors.
- Assure that the Reserve and National Guard continue in a key national defense role, both at home and abroad.

== Programs and services ==
=== The Officer Journal ===
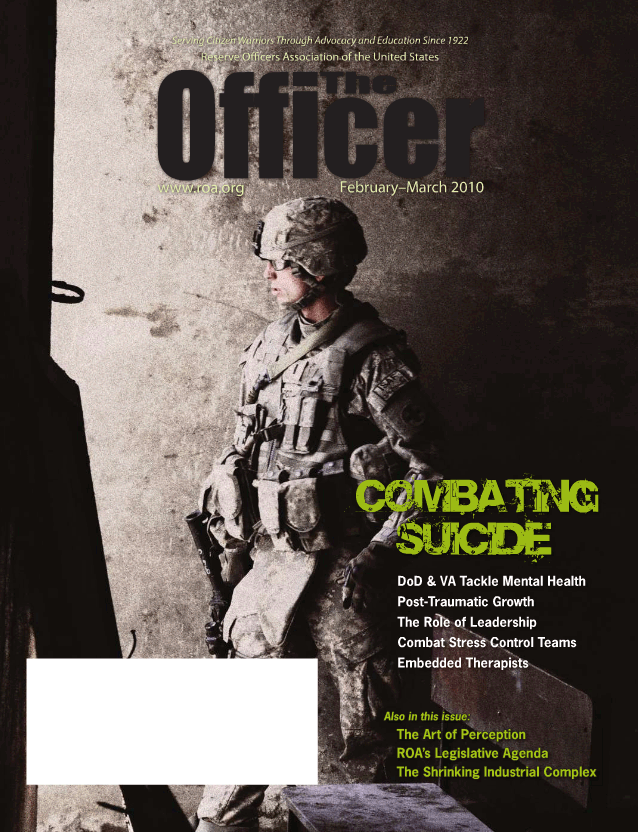
February–March 2010 edition of The Officer magazine

ROA produces a bimonthly journal, The Officer, which focuses largely on national security and defense policy. Each issue has a column covering each branch of the armed forces, a Law Review detailing Reservists' civil rights, the National Security Report, a scholarly paper on some aspect of national security, and the annual year-end issue features contributions from all of the Reserve Components' top commanders. The magazine goes to ROA members, plus all flag and general officers in the Department of Defense and every member of Congress.

In 1982, John T. Carlton and John F. Slinkman published "The ROA Story: A History of the Reserve Officers Association of the United States – 1st Edition/1st Printing" book in New York.

=== Defense Education Forum ===
ROA's Defense Education Forum (DEF) produces a series of programs featuring experts speaking to topics including homeland security, civil affairs, terrorism, continuum of service, USERRA, and civilian-military relations. Through its professional development seminars, DEF also provides for serving Reserve officers of all the branches professional networking opportunities, on-site mentoring, briefings by senior Department of Defense officials, access to government and military service leaders, personal career information, and training opportunities.

=== Service Members Law Center ===
ROA's Service Members Law Center specializes in educating employers and part-time warriors about the Uniformed Servicemembers Employment and Reemployment Rights Act (USERRA), the Servicemembers Civil Relief Act (SCRA), and military voting rights. The Service Members Law Center coordinates the activities of lawyers and legal service providers who seek to help Service members in these areas of the law nationwide, and files amicus curiae (friend of the court) briefs on behalf of ROA in USERRA and SCRA cases that have national significance.

== Structure ==
ROA is organized into 55 departments, one in each of the 50 states, plus departments in Latin America, the District of Columbia, Europe, the Far East, and Puerto Rico. Each department is further divided into regional chapters. There are more than 300 chapters worldwide.

ROA is led by elected national officers, and ROA's business activities are conducted by a national staff in Washington, DC.

== Awards ==
Each year the ROA hands out two awards, one for a Junior Reserve Officer Training Corps (JROTC) and one for a Warrant Officer.

== ROA Honorees ==
=== Minuteman of the Year ===
Since 1958, ROA has honored each year "The citizen who has contributed most to National Security during these times."

Following are the Minutemen of the Year since 1990:

- 2014 Arnold Punaro
- 2011 Tom Latham, US Representative
- 2010 Blanche Lincoln, US Senator
- 2009 Robert M. Gates, Secretary of Defense
- 2008 Joseph I. Lieberman, US Senator
- 2007 Gene Taylor, US Representative
- 2006 Mary Landrieu, US Senator
- 2005 Saxby Chambliss, US Senator
- 2004 Lindsey Graham, US Senator
- 2003 Mike DeWine, US Senator
- 2002 George W. Bush, President; C.W. Bill Young, US Representative
- 2001 John McCain, US Senator
- 2000 Jeff Sessions, US Senator
- 2000 Max Cleland, US Senator
- 1999 Bob Livingston, US Representative
- 1998 Paul McHale, US Representative; Steve Buyer, US Representative
- 1997 William J. Perry, Secretary of Defense
- 1996 Floyd Spence, US Representative
- 1995 Ike Skelton, US Representative
- 1994 Gregory H. Laughlin, US Representative
- 1993 Daniel K. Inouye, US Senator
- 1992 John P. Murtha, US Representative
- 1991 George H.W. Bush, President
- 1990 Robert C. Byrd, US Senator

=== Minuteman Hall of Fame ===
Since 1959, ROA has also honored each year a citizen or soldier "who has conspicuously contributed to the advancement of ROA programs and objectives."

On 28 February 1962 the ROA presented U.S. President John F. Kennedy with an official induction into the Minuteman Hall of Fame.

Following are the Minuteman Hall of Fame inductees since 1998:

- 2011 Daniel R. May, Rear Admiral, USCG
- 2010 Jack C. Stultz, Lieutenant General, USAR
- 2007 Peter Pace, General, USMC
- 2007 John A. Bradley, Lieutenant General, USAF
- 2006 Thomas F. Hall, Assistant Secretary of Defense
- 2005 Robert J. Papp Jr., Rear Admiral, USCG
- 2004 Bob Hope, Patriot
- 2004 Dennis M. McCarthy, Lieutenant General, USMC
- 2004 Richard B. Myers, Chairman, Joint Chiefs of Staff
- 2003 John B. Totushek, Vice Admiral, USNR
- 2003 James E. Sherrard III, Lieutenant General, USAF
- 2002 Russell C. Davis, Lieutenant General, USAF
- 2002 James M. Loy, Admiral, USCG
- 2002 Thomas J. Plewes, Lieutenant General, USA
- 2001 Robert A. McIntosh, Major General, USAF
- 2000 Charles L. Cragin, Assistant Secretary of Defense
- 1999 Terrence M. O'Connell, Chairman, Reserve Forces Policy Board
- 1998 Robert E. Kramek, Admiral, USCG

== See also ==
- Commissioned Officers Association of the U.S. Public Health Service
- Military Officers Association of America
