= Assistant Secretary of Defense for Manpower and Reserve Affairs =

United States government official

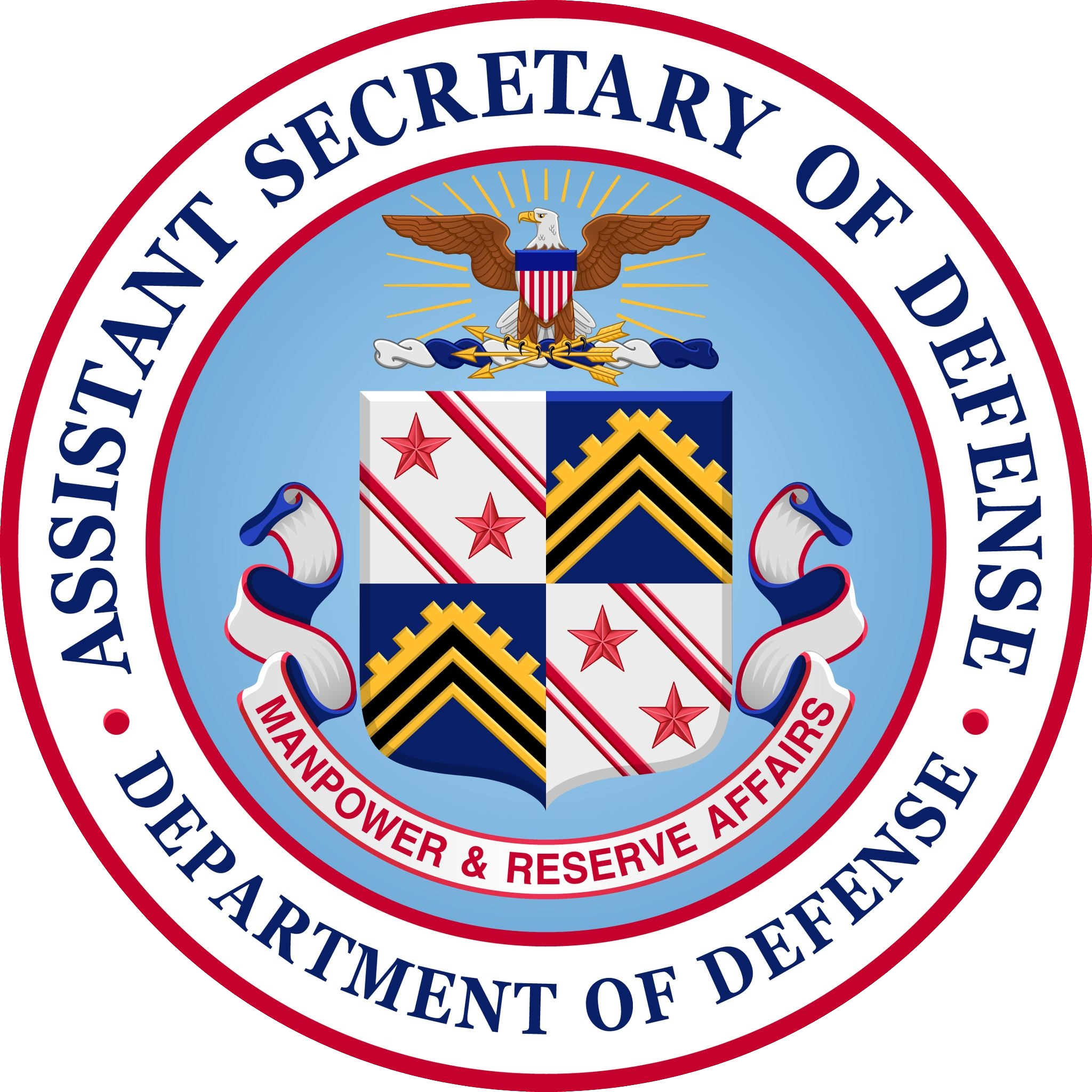
- Seal of the assistant secretary of defense for manpower and reserve affairs

- Flag of an assistant secretary of defense

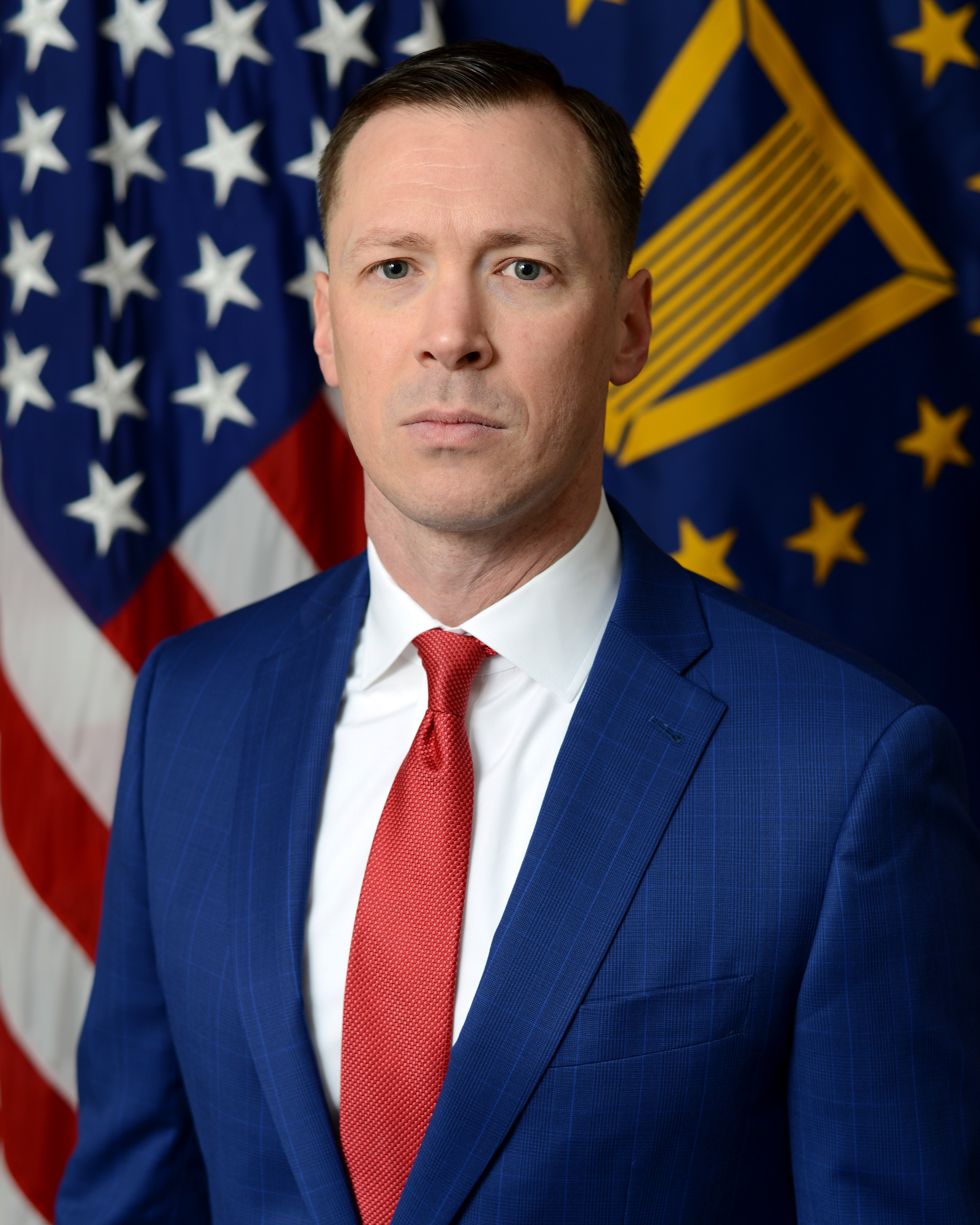
- Incumbent; Tim Dill since December 29, 2025
- Department of Defense
- Abbreviation: ASD (M&RA)
- Member of: Office of the Secretary of Defense
- Reports to: Under Secretary of Defense for Personnel and Readiness
- Appointer: The president; with Senate advice and consent
- Term length: At the pleasure of the president
- Formation: 12 January 1984
- First holder: Jim Webb
- Salary: $165,300
- Website: Official website

In the United States Department of Defense, the assistant secretary of defense for manpower and reserve affairs (ASD (M&RA)) serves as principal staff assistant and advisor to the secretary of defense, deputy secretary of defense and under secretary of defense for personnel and readiness, with responsibility for "overall policies and procedures of [U.S.] Total Force manpower, personnel and reserve affairs," including the Army National Guard, Army Reserve, Navy Reserve, Marine Corps Reserve, Air National Guard, Air Force Reserve and Coast Guard Reserve. The ASD (M&RA) reports directly to the under secretary of defense (P&R) and exercises authority, direction, and control over the National Committee for Employer Support of the Guard and Reserve.

== Responsibilities ==
According to a statement of intent signed by the ASD (M&RA), the purpose of the office is "to set the conditions for a sustainable, seamlessly integrated and complementary total force." To do so, the ASD (M&RA) seeks to "proactively deliver credible advice and information about the capabilities of the reserve components," and "develop the policies and resources necessary to fully exploit those capabilities." The language of these statements is precise and deliberate. As the statement of intent explains:

- The ASD (M&RA) "sets the conditions" because the individual armed services must integrate the forces themselves.
- “Seamlessly integrated” and “complementary” are characteristics of a reserve force that can augment and reinforce the active components in every facet of the National Security Strategy. These characteristics imply an absence of friction and a mutually supporting force structure.
- A “total force” is the combination of active and reserve components that service chiefs provide willingly, and that unified combatant commanders can utilize effectively.
- “Delivering credible advice and information” requires fidelity to fact and a humility that avoids boastfulness and over-promising.
- “Resources” include modern and well-positioned equipment and facilities, and the assets necessary for a force that is trained for both irregular and conventional warfare prior to mobilization and deployment.
- To "exploit" reserve capabilities means “to take full advantage” of them. In business, it would mean a high return on investment.

The statement of intent also sets out a metric for this office's performance: "Our success will be measured by the degree to which we have advanced a culture of mutual appreciation and confidence in both the active and reserve components."

== History ==
The title and portfolio of the assistant secretary for manpower and reserve affairs has evolved several times over the years. An assistant secretary of defense was first assigned oversight of DoD manpower and personnel affairs in 1950 by Secretary George C. Marshall. In September 1955, Secretary Charles Wilson redesignated the position as Assistant Secretary of Defense (Manpower, Personnel, and Reserve).

DoD Directive 5120.27 (31 January 1961) redesignated the position as Assistant Secretary of Defense (Manpower), but after a few years, the Reserve Forces Bill of Rights and Vitalization Act (P.L. 90-168, signed 1 December 1967), changed the title to Assistant Secretary of Defense (Manpower and Reserve Affairs).

Defense Directive 5124.1, signed 20 April 1977, combined the position with the assistant secretary of defense (installations and logistics) to become the assistant secretary of defense (manpower, reserve affairs, and logistics).

Following the FY 1984 Defense Authorization Act (P.L. 98-94, 24 September 1983), the title was changed to Assistant Secretary of Defense (Manpower, Installations, and Logistics), and the reserve affairs functions were reconstituted into a new position called Assistant Secretary of Defense (Reserve Affairs).

The assistant secretary of defense (reserve affairs) became a reporting official to the under secretary of defense for personnel and readiness when the latter role was established through the National Defense Authorization Act for Fiscal Year 1994 (P.L. 103-160).

Section 902 of the Carl Levin and Howard P. "Buck" McKeon National Defense Authorization Act for Fiscal Year 2015 (P.L. 113-291, 19 December 2014) redesignated the position as the assistant secretary of defense for manpower and reserve affairs.

== Officeholders ==
Assistant secretaries of defense for manpower and reserve affairs (and preceding offices)
Name	Tenure	SecDef(s) served under	President(s) served under
Assistant Secretary of Defense (Manpower and Personnel)
Anna M. Rosenberg	November 15, 1950 – January 20, 1953	George C. Marshall; Robert A. Lovett	Harry Truman
John A. Hannah	February 11, 1953 – July 31, 1954	Charles E. Wilson	Dwight Eisenhower
Carter L. Burgess	September 24, 1954 – September, 1955	Charles E. Wilson	Dwight Eisenhower
Assistant Secretary of Defense (Manpower, Personnel, and Reserve)
Carter L. Burgess	September, 1955 – January 22, 1957	Charles E. Wilson	Dwight Eisenhower
William H. Francis	April 19, 1957 – May 24, 1958	Charles E. Wilson; Neil H. McElroy	Dwight Eisenhower
Charles O. Finucane	July 15, 1958 – January 19, 1961	Neil H. McElroy; Thomas S. Gates	Dwight Eisenhower
Assistant Secretary of Defense (Manpower)
Carlisle P. Runge	February 17, 1961 – July 30, 1962	Robert S. McNamara	John F. Kennedy
Norman S. Paul	August 8, 1962 – September 30, 1965	Robert S. McNamara	John F. Kennedy; Lyndon Johnson
Thomas D. Morris	October 1, 1965 – August 31, 1967	Robert S. McNamara	Lyndon Johnson
Alfred B. Fitt	October 9, 1967 – December 31, 1967	Robert S. McNamara	Lyndon Johnson
Assistant Secretary of Defense (Manpower and Reserve Affairs)
Alfred B. Fitt	January 1, 1968 – February 20, 1969	Robert S. McNamara; Clark M. Clifford; Melvin R. Laird	Lyndon Johnson; Richard Nixon
Roger T. Kelley	March 3, 1969 – June 1, 1973	Melvin R. Laird; Elliot L. Richardson	Richard Nixon
Carl W. Clewlow (Acting)	June 1, 1973 – September 1, 1973	Elliot L. Richardson; James R. Schlesinger	Richard Nixon
William K. Brehm	September 1, 1973 – March 18, 1976	James R. Schlesinger; Donald H. Rumsfeld	Richard Nixon; Gerald Ford
David P. Taylor	July 7, 1976 – February 12, 1977	Donald H. Rumsfeld; Harold Brown	Gerald Ford; Jimmy Carter
Assistant Secretary of Defense (Manpower, Reserve Affairs, and Logistics)
John P. White	May 11, 1977 – October 31, 1978	Harold Brown	Jimmy Carter
Robert B. Pirie, Jr.	June 17, 1979 – January 20, 1981	Harold Brown	Jimmy Carter
Lawrence J. Korb	May 4, 1981 – January 12, 1984	Caspar W. Weinberger	Ronald Reagan
Assistant Secretary of Defense (Reserve Affairs)
Jim Webb	May 3, 1984 - April 10, 1987	Caspar W. Weinberger	Ronald Reagan
Stephen M. Duncan	October 26, 1987 - January 20, 1993	Caspar W. Weinberger; Frank C. Carlucci III; William H. Taft IV (Acting); Richard B. Cheney	Ronald Reagan; George H. W. Bush
Deborah R. Lee	June 1, 1993 - April 11, 1998	Leslie Aspin, Jr. William J. Perry; William S. Cohen	Bill Clinton
Charles Cragin	April 12, 1998 - August 3, 1999 (Acting); August 4, 1999 - May 31, 2001 (PDASD, in charge)	William S. Cohen; Donald H. Rumsfeld	Bill Clinton; George W. Bush
Thomas F. Hall	October 9, 2002 - April 8, 2009	Donald H. Rumsfeld; Robert M. Gates	George W. Bush; Barack Obama
Dennis M. McCarthy	June 25, 2009 - April 19, 2011	Robert M. Gates	Barack Obama
David McGinnis (Acting)	April 19, 2011 - May 24, 2012	Leon Panetta	Barack Obama
Jessica L. Wright	May 24, 2012 - December 31, 2012	Leon Panetta	Barack Obama
Richard O. Wightman, Jr. (Acting)	January 1, 2013 - August 2015	Chuck Hagel	Barack Obama
Assistant Secretary of Defense (Manpower and Reserve Affairs)
Todd A. Weiler	May 15, 2016 - January 20, 2017	Ashton Carter	Barack Obama
Stephanie Barna (Acting)	January 20, 2017 - July 30, 2018	James Mattis	Donald Trump
Virginia S. Penrod (Acting)	July 31, 2018 - October 22, 2018	James Mattis	Donald Trump
James N. Stewart	October 22, 2018 - December 13, 2019	James Mattis; Mark Esper	Donald Trump
Virginia S. Penrod (Acting/Performing the Duties of)	December 13, 2019 - May 2, 2022	Mark Esper; Lloyd Austin	Donald Trump; Joe Biden
Thomas A. Constable (Performing the Duties of)	May 2, 2022 - April 1, 2023	Lloyd Austin	Joe Biden
Grier Martin (Performing the Duties of)	April 1, 2023 - March 13, 2024	Lloyd Austin	Joe Biden
Ronald Keohane	March 13, 2024 – January 20, 2025	Lloyd Austin	Joe Biden
Tim Dill (Acting)	January 20, 2025 - July 18, 2025	Pete Hegseth	Donald Trump
Jules W. Hurst III (Acting)	July 18, 2025 – August 11, 2025	Pete Hegseth	Donald Trump
Bill Fitzhugh (Acting)	August 11, 2025 – November 13, 2025	Pete Hegseth	Donald Trump
Merylnn Carson (Acting)	November 13, 2025 – December 29, 2025	Pete Hegseth	Donald Trump
Tim Dill	December 29, 2025 – Present	Pete Hegseth	Donald Trump
