= James N. Stewart =

American retired air force general and government official

Jimmy Stewart
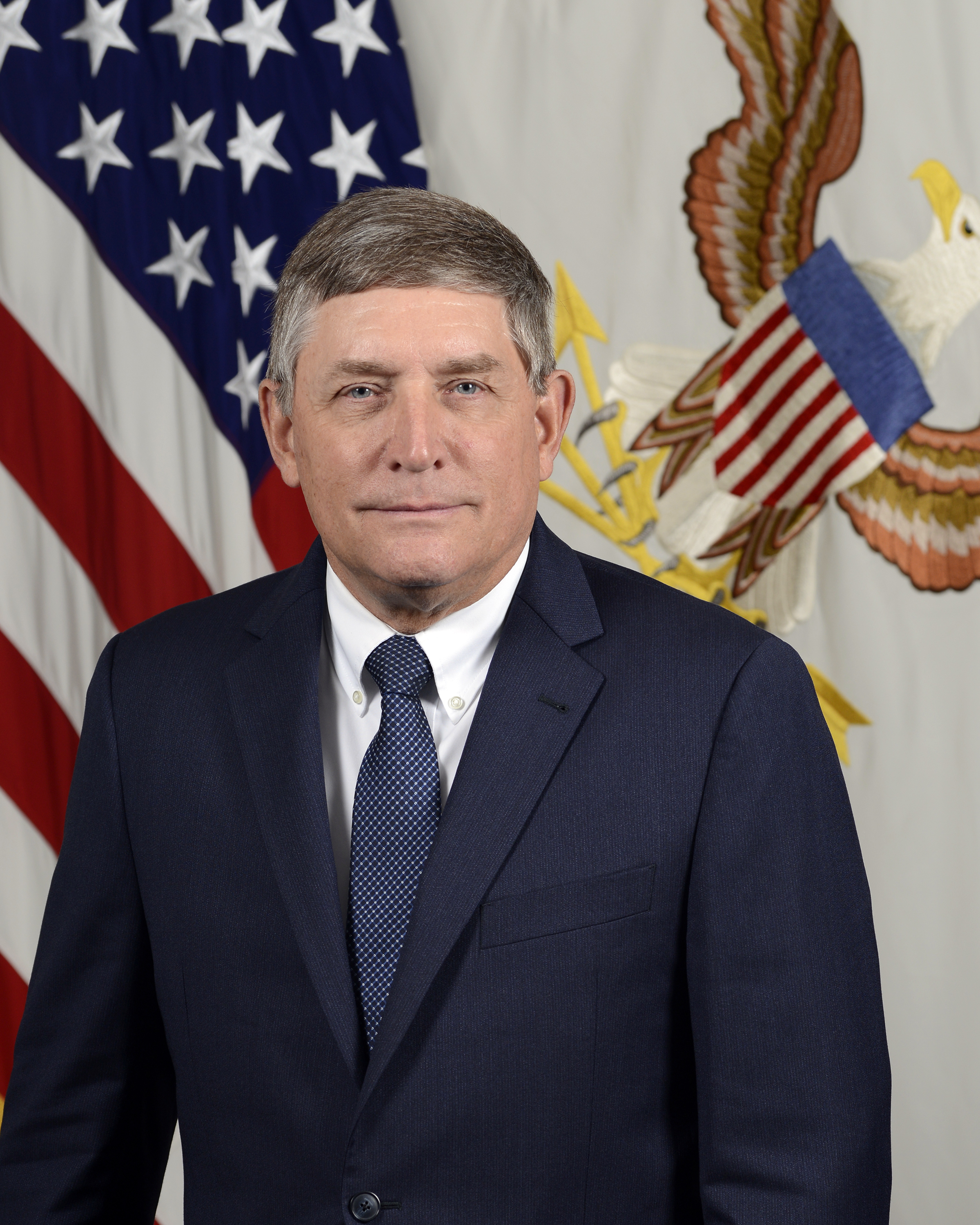
- Official portrait, 2018

Acting United States Under Secretary of Defense for Personnel and Readiness
- In office October 22, 2018 – December 13, 2019
- President: Donald Trump
- Preceded by: Stephanie Barna (acting)
- Succeeded by: Matthew Donovan

Assistant Secretary of Defense for Manpower and Reserve Affairs
- In office October 22, 2018 – December 13, 2019
- President: Donald Trump
- Preceded by: Todd A. Weiler
- Succeeded by: Ronald Keohane (2024)

Personal details
- Education: Auburn University; Central Michigan University; National War College

Military service
- Branch/service: United States Air Force
- Years of service: 1977–1992 (active); 1992–2014 (reserve)
- Rank: Major general
- Awards: Air Force Distinguished Service Medal; Legion of Merit (2); Airman's Medal

James N. Stewart is a retired American military officer and civil servant. Confirmed as Assistant Secretary of Defense for Manpower and Reserve Affairs in Donald Trump's first presidency, he served throughout his tenure from 2018 as acting Under Secretary of Defense for Personnel and Readiness and Assistant Secretary of Defense for Manpower and Reserve Affairs before resigning in 2019.

== Early life and education ==
Stewart was born the son of a retired air force lieutenant colonel and Vietnam War veteran, and, from a young age, he desired to follow in his father's footsteps. He graduated with a bachelor's degree in sociology and criminology from Auburn University, where he was also a member of the school's Air Force Reserve Officer Training Corps.

== Military career ==
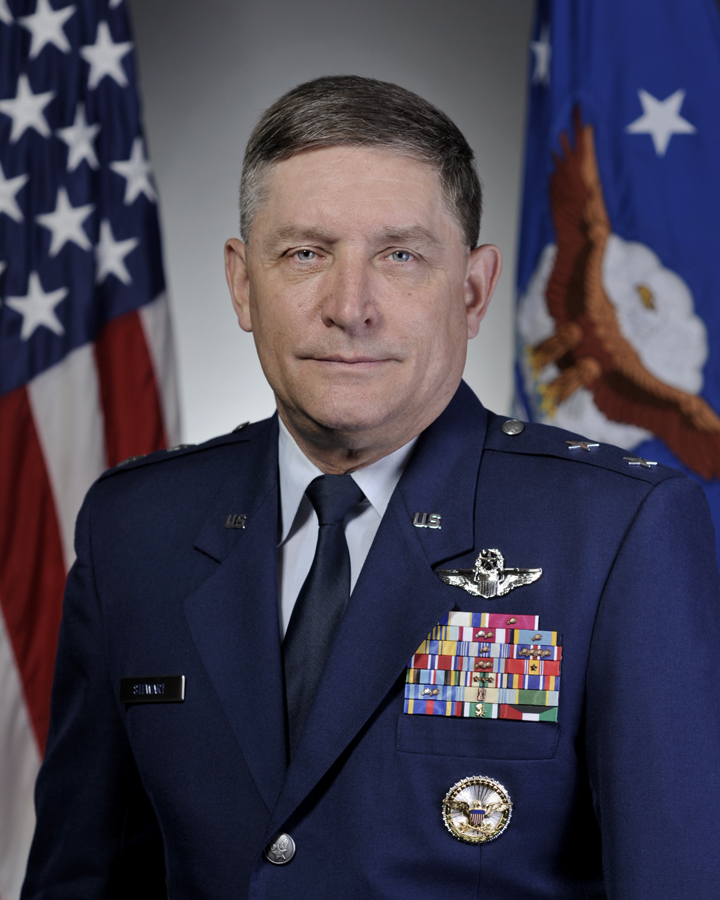
Stewart as a major general in the air force reserve in 2012

Stewart was commissioned as a second lieutenant in 1977 and left active duty in 1992. He continued his military career as a member of the Air Force Reserve Command until 2014.

His decorations include the Air Force Distinguished Service Medal, Legion of Merit, Airman's Medal, and Meritorious Service Medal.

== Civilian career ==
Following his retirement from the air force reserve, Stewart moved to Charlotte, North Carolina. He was appointed to the North Carolina Military Affairs Commission by Governor Pat McCrory in 2015.

President Donald Trump chose Stewart to be Assistant Secretary of Defense for Manpower and Reserve Affairs in January 2018, confirmed by the Senate on October 11. After serving in this position and as acting Under Secretary of Defense for Personnel and Readiness until December 2019, he submitted his resignation to Secretary Mark Esper.

== Dates of rank ==
Rank	Branch	Date
Second lieutenant	Air Force	7 June 1977
First lieutenant	Air Force	7 December 1979
Captain	Air Force	7 December 1981
Major	Air Force	November 1 1988
Lieutenant colonel	Air Force	June 13 1996
Colonel	Air Force	March 30 2001
Brigadier general	Air Force	February 17 2007
Major general	Air Force	February 2 2010

== Decorations ==

Air Force Distinguished Service Medal		Legion of Merit with one oak leaf cluster
Airman's Medal	Meritorious Service Medal with seven oak leaf clusters	Aerial Achievement Medal with one oak leaf cluster
Air Force Commendation Medal	Air Force Achievement Medal with one oak leaf cluster	Air Force Outstanding Unit Award with three oak leaf clusters
Air Force Organizational Excellence Award	Combat Readiness Medal with two oak leaf clusters	National Defense Service Medal with one service star
Armed Forces Expeditionary Medal	Southwest Asia Service Medal with three service stars	Global War on Terrorism Service Medal
Air Force Longevity Service Award with seven oak leaf clusters	Armed Forces Reserve Medal with bronze hourglass device	Small Arms Expert Marksmanship Ribbon
Air Force Training Ribbon	Kuwait Liberation Medal (Saudi Arabia)	Kuwait Liberation Medal (Kuwait)
