= Capital University Law School =

Private law school in Columbus, Ohio, US

Coordinates: 39.963°N 82.992°W

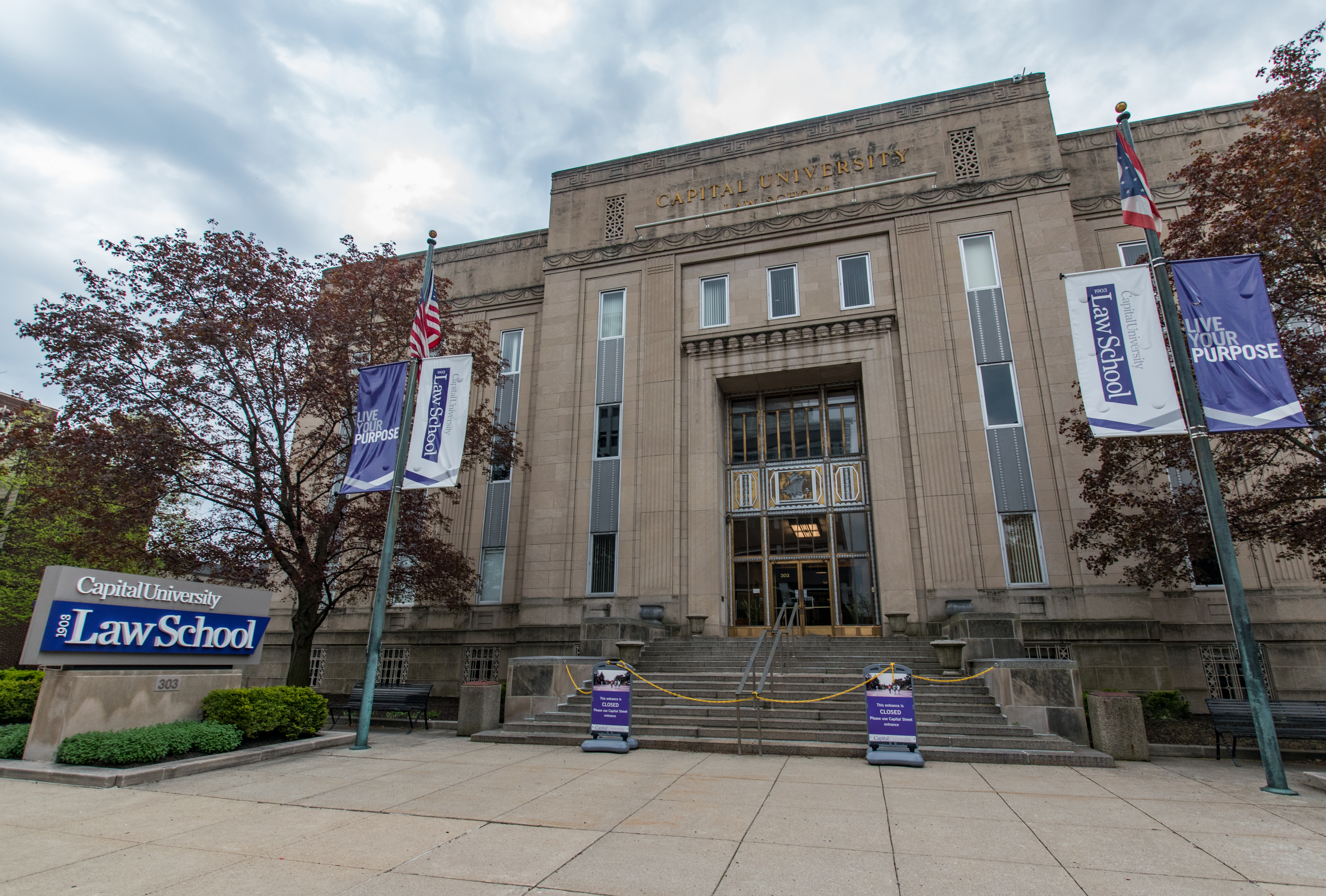
- Parent school: Capital University
- Religious affiliation: Evangelical Lutheran Church in America
- Established: 1903
- School type: Private
- Dean: Marc D. Falkoff
- Location: Columbus, Ohio, United States
- Enrollment: 480
- Faculty: 79
- USNWR ranking: 174th (2025)
- Bar pass rate: 77.6%
- Website: law.capital.edu

Capital University Law School is an ABA-accredited private law school located in downtown Columbus, Ohio, United States. The law school is affiliated with Capital University, the oldest university in Central Ohio and one of the oldest and largest Lutheran-affiliated universities in North America.

== History ==
The Columbus Law School was founded in 1903, as part of a national program sponsored by YMCA to make legal education practical, accessible, and affordable. The school affiliated with Capital University in 1966 and became the Capital University Law School. Its faculty now stands at 79, and its law library holdings include 265,000 volumes, periodicals, and microfilms.

== Campus ==
Capital University Law School is located in the heart of the Discovery District of Columbus, Ohio. The site held the city's Central High School from 1862 to 1928. The school's building was constructed in 1941 for the Columbus Life Insurance Company, previously housed in the Clinton DeWeese Firestone mansion. In 1996, after 55 years of serving the insurance company, Capital University Law School began using the building. The building's front entrance is framed by polished brass relief artwork commissioned by artist Ralph J. Menconi, depicting a ship and surrounded by vintage Art-Deco era accents.

== Academics ==
Capital University Law School has been accredited by the American Bar Association since 1950 and has been a member of the Association of American Law Schools since 1983. The student-faculty ratio is 10.6:1. The law school has been a charter member of the League of Ohio Law Schools since 1934.

Capital's 2022 entering class was composed of 162 students. Capital Law School offers a Juris Doctor, an LL.M. in Business, an LL.M. in Taxation, and an LL.M. in Business and Taxation.

The school's J.D. program has a full-time day division, as well as a part-time day and a part-time evening division. The J.D. program has concentrations in children and family law, civil litigation, criminal litigation, dispute resolution, environmental law, governmental affairs, labor and employment law, small business entities, and publicly-held companies. Students in the J.D. program may also avail themselves of joint degree programs in Master of Business Administration, Master of Science in Nursing, and Master of Theology.

Capital Law is home to The Family and Youth Law Center and the Center for Dispute Resolution. Capital University Law School also serves the legal profession and business professionals through certificate programs (paralegal, legal nurse consultant, life care planner, as well as mediation and dispute resolution) and a variety of scholarly symposia and conferences that offer continuing legal education credit. Capital also offers a general litigation clinic, a mediation clinic, a family advocacy clinic, and a small business clinic.

== Rankings ==
In 2023, U.S. News & World Report ranked Capital's full-time Juris Doctor program 175th for full-time programs in the United States. That same year, U.S. News ranked Capital's part-time Juris Doctor program between 64th and 70th for part-time programs in the country.

The school was voted a "Best Value Law School" on the basis of tuition by the National Jurist magazine in 2009. In 2011, the National Jurist magazine, as well as PreLaw magazine named Capital as one of the nation's top law schools in preparing students for legal careers in public service. In 2012, the magazines listed Capital as one of the nation's top law schools in terms of preparing its students for the bar exam. In 2014, Capital was named to the National Jurist Magazine's "Honor Roll" of law schools that provide practical legal education. In 2015, Capital was once again listed in the National Jurist Magazine's "Honor Roll" of law schools that deliver a practical, experiential legal education. In 2019, PreLaw magazine listed Capital Law as one of the top law schools in the country for practical training and alternate dispute resolution. PreLaw magazine further listed Capital as one of the top law schools for criminal law in 2019.

== Bar passage ==
Capital's average Ohio bar passage rate for first-time takers of exams administered in 2022 was 72.99 percent.

== Post-graduation employment ==
Capital University's Law School Transparency employment score is 51.6%. The university's Law School Transparency under-employment score is 21.4%, indicating the percentage of the Class of 2021 unemployed, pursuing an additional degree, or working in a non-professional, short-term, or part-time job nine months after graduation. The median salary for Capital University Law School graduates is $56,836.

== Costs ==
The total attendance cost (tuition, fees, and living expenses) at Capital University Law School for the 2024 academic year is approximately $63,950 for a full-time student. The Law School Transparency estimated debt-financed cost of attendance for three years is $236,228.

== People ==
Various notable faculty and alums have contributed at the local, state, and national levels.

=== Notable faculty ===
- Bradley A. Smith - former Commissioner and Chairman of the Federal Election Commission from 2000 to 2005
- Jack Guttenberg - a legal writer, an expert on professional responsibility, and a co-author of the authoritative source on the Ohio new law of professional conduct for attorneys, Ohio Law of Professional Conduct.

A survey completed in 2008 of faculty scholarship conducted by the Roger Williams University School of Law found Capital's faculty to be one of the most productive scholarly faculties in its tier for 1993–2008, Capital being the #2 law school as listed in U.S. News & World Report's fourth-tier law schools, and #36 of law schools that were outside of the top 50 law schools in U.S. News.

=== Notable alumni ===
- Jennifer Brunner, Ohio Secretary of State (2007–2010)
- Jonathan Dever, former State of Ohio Representative
- Daniel Gaul, judge for the Cuyahoga County Common Pleas Court
- Bruce Edward Johnson, Ohio Lt. Governor (2004–2006)
- Jim Jordan, U.S. Representative (R-OH, 2007–present)
- Greg Lashutka, Mayor, Columbus, OH (1991–1999)
- Allen Loughry, Justice of the West Virginia Supreme Court of Appeals
- Dennis M. McCarthy, Assistant Secretary of Defense for Reserve Affairs (2009–2011)
- Matthew W. McFarland, Federal District Judge for the Southern District of Ohio (2019–present)
- Paul McNulty, US Deputy Attorney General (2005–2007), US Attorney for the Eastern District of Virginia (2001–2005)
- Sarah D. Morrison, Federal District Judge for the Southern District of Ohio (2019–present)
- Deborah Pryce, U.S. Representative (R-OH, 1993–2009)
- Harley Rouda, former US Representative (D-CA, 2019–2021)
- Michael Watson, Federal District Judge for the Southern District of Ohio (2004–present)
- Dave Yost, Ohio's 32nd Auditor of State and 51st Ohio Attorney General
