= Assistant Secretary of Defense for Readiness =

United States Department of Defense position

Flag of a U.S. Assistant Secretary of Defense

The Assistant Secretary of Defense for Readiness, or ASD(R), is a Defense Department position responsible for civilian and military personnel policy, readiness of the force, military community and family policy and diversity management and equal opportunity.

Its predecessor, the Assistant Secretary of Defense for Readiness and Force Management, or ASD(R&FM), was a high-ranking position in the Defense Department responsible for the policies, plans and programs for military and civilian personnel management, including recruitment, education, career development, equal opportunity, compensation, recognition, discipline and separation of all Department of Defense personnel. The ASD(FMP) reported directly to the Under Secretary of Defense for Personnel and Readiness, or USD(P&R). The ASD(FMP) was replaced in 2002 by a new Deputy Under Secretary position, which is today known as the Principal Deputy Under Secretary of Defense for Personnel and Readiness.

== History ==
An Assistant Secretary of Defense was first assigned oversight of DoD manpower, personnel and reserve affairs in 1950. Defense Directive 5124.1, signed 20 April 1977, also delegated oversight of logistics to this position. Following the FY 1984 Defense Authorization Act, the reserve affairs functions were transferred to the new Assistant Secretary of Defense for Reserve Affairs. Meanwhile, installations and logistics functions transferred to a new Assistant Secretary of Defense (Acquisition and Logistics) in July 1985.

From the mid-80s to mid-90s, the position was responsible for military and civilian manpower training, family matters, and review of manpower requirements, both military and civilian, and also exercised direction of equal opportunity matters. After the National Defense Authorization Act for Fiscal Year 1994 (P.L. 103-160) established the Under Secretary of Defense for Personnel and Readiness, this position was redesignated the Assistant Secretary of Defense for Force Management Policy, and served as a staff assistant to the USD(P&R). The position was abolished in November 2002 when the new Deputy Under Secretary of Defense for Personnel and Readiness took office. The portfolio of the former ASD(FMP) is today distributed across a Principal Deputy Assistant Secretary of Defense for Personnel and Readiness (previously known as the Principal Deputy Under Secretary of Defense) and five Deputy Assistant Secretaries of Defense (previously known as Deputy Under Secretaries of Defense).

== Office Holders ==
The table below includes both the various titles of this post over time, as well as all the holders of those offices.

Assistant Secretaries of Defense (Readiness)
Name	Tenure	SecDef(s) Served Under	President(s) Served Under
Assistant Secretary of Defense (Manpower and Personnel)
Anna M. Rosenberg	November 15, 1950 – January 20, 1953	George C. Marshall; Robert A. Lovett	Harry Truman
John A. Hannah	February 11, 1953 – July 31, 1954	Charles E. Wilson	Dwight Eisenhower
Carter L. Burgess	September 24, 1954 – September, 1955	Charles E. Wilson	Dwight Eisenhower
Assistant Secretary of Defense (Manpower, Personnel, and Reserve)
Carter L. Burgess	September, 1955 – January 22, 1957	Charles E. Wilson	Dwight Eisenhower
William H. Francis	April 19, 1957 – May 24, 1958	Charles E. Wilson; Neil H. McElroy	Dwight Eisenhower
Charles O. Finucane	July 15, 1958 – January 19, 1961	Neil H. McElroy; Thomas S. Gates	Dwight Eisenhower
Assistant Secretary of Defense (Manpower)
Carlisle P. Runge	February 17, 1961 – July 30, 1962	Robert S. McNamara	John F. Kennedy
Norman S. Paul	August 8, 1962 – September 30, 1965	Robert S. McNamara	John F. Kennedy; Lyndon Johnson
Thomas D. Morris	October 1, 1965 – August 31, 1967	Robert S. McNamara	Lyndon Johnson
Alfred B. Fitt	October 9, 1967 – December 31, 1967	Robert S. McNamara	Lyndon Johnson
Assistant Secretary of Defense (Manpower and Reserve Affairs)
Alfred B. Fitt	January 1, 1968 – February 20, 1969	Robert S. McNamara; Clark M. Clifford; Melvin R. Laird	Lyndon Johnson; Richard Nixon
Roger T. Kelley	March 3, 1969 – June 1, 1973	Melvin R. Laird; Elliot L. Richardson	Richard Nixon
Carl W. Clewlow (Acting)	June 1, 1973 – September 1, 1973	Elliot L. Richardson; James R. Schlesinger	Richard Nixon
William K. Brehm	September 1, 1973 – March 18, 1976	James R. Schlesinger; Donald H. Rumsfeld	Richard Nixon; Gerald Ford
David P. Taylor	July 7, 1976 – February 12, 1977	Donald H. Rumsfeld; Harold Brown	Gerald Ford; Jimmy Carter
Assistant Secretary of Defense (Manpower, Reserve Affairs, and Logistics)
John P. White	May 11, 1977 – October 31, 1978	Harold Brown	Jimmy Carter
Robert B. Pirie, Jr.	June 17, 1979 – January 20, 1981	Harold Brown	Jimmy Carter
Lawrence J. Korb	May 4, 1981 – January 12, 1984	Caspar W. Weinberger	Ronald Reagan
Assistant Secretary of Defense (Manpower, Installations, and Logistics)
Lawrence J. Korb	January 12, 1984 – July 5, 1985	Caspar W. Weinberger	Ronald Reagan
Assistant Secretary of Defense (Force Management and Personnel)
Lawrence J. Korb	July 5, 1985 – August 31, 1985	Caspar W. Weinberger	Ronald Reagan
Chapman B. Cox	December 7, 1985 – July 8, 1987	Caspar W. Weinberger	Ronald Reagan
Grant S. Green, Jr.	February 3, 1988 – March 5, 1989	Frank C. Carlucci III; William H. Taft IV (Acting)	Ronald Reagan; George H. W. Bush
Christopher Jehn	November 20, 1989 – January 20, 1993	Richard B. Cheney	George H. W. Bush
Edwin Dorn	July 2, 1993 – March 16, 1994	Leslie Aspin, Jr. William J. Perry	Bill Clinton
Assistant Secretary of Defense (Force Management Policy)
Frederick F. Y. Pang	October 11, 1994 – November 15, 1997	William J. Perry; William S. Cohen	Bill Clinton
Francis M. Rush, Jr. (Acting)	November 15, 1997 – November 12, 1999	William S. Cohen	Bill Clinton
Alphonso Maldon, Jr.	November 12, 1999 – January 19, 2001	William S. Cohen	Bill Clinton
Charles S. Abell	May 8, 2001 – November 14, 2002	Donald H. Rumsfeld	George W. Bush
Assistant Secretary of Defense (Readiness and Force Management)
Frederick E. Vollrath (Acting)	March 26, 2012 – April 18, 2013	Leon Panetta; Chuck Hagel	Barack Obama
Frederick E. Vollrath	April 19, 2013 – June 14, 2014	Chuck Hagel	Barack Obama
Stephanie Barna (Acting)	June 14, 2014 – April 8, 2016	Chuck Hagel; Ashton Carter	Barack Obama
Dan Feehan (Acting)	April 8, 2016 – January 20, 2017	Ashton Carter	Barack Obama
Assistant Secretary of Defense (Readiness)
Elizabeth P. Van Winkle (Acting)	January 21, 2017 - October, 31, 2017	James Mattis	Donald Trump
Veronica Daigle (Acting)	October 31, 2017 - June 27, 2019	James Mattis Mark Esper	Donald Trump
Veronica Daigle	June 27, 2019 – January 31, 2020	Mark Esper	Donald Trump
Tom Constable (Acting)	January 31, 2020 – July 22, 2021	Mark Esper; Christopher C. Miller (Acting); David Norquist (Acting); Lloyd Austin	Donald Trump; Joe Biden
Shawn Skelly	July 22, 2021 – January 20, 2025	Lloyd Austin	Joe Biden
Jules W. Hurst III (Acting)	January 20, 2025 - July 18, 2025	Pete Hegseth	Donald Trump
Peter I. Belk (Acting)	July 18, 2025 – February 23, 2026	Pete Hegseth	Donald Trump
Maurice Todd	February 23, 2026 – Present	Pete Hegseth	Donald Trump
