= Townsend Hoopes =

American historian and government official (1922–2004)

- Born: April 28, 1922; Duluth, Minnesota, U.S.
- Died: September 20, 2004 (aged 82); Baja California, Mexico
- Resting place: Arlington National Cemetery
- Other name: Tim Hoopes
- Education: Yale College, National War College
- Occupations: Historian, government official
- Known for: Under Secretary of the Air Force (1967–1969)
- Spouse(s): Marion Schmidt; Ann Merrifield
- Children: 3
- Awards: Bancroft Prize (1974)

Townsend Walter Hoopes II (April 28, 1922 – September 20, 2004) was an American historian and government official, who reached the height of his career as Under Secretary of the Air Force from 1967 to 1969.

== Biography ==
Hoopes, known as Tim, was born in Duluth, Minnesota. He graduated from Phillips Academy before attending Yale College, where he became a member of the Skull and Bones society. He served as captain of the 1943 Yale Bulldogs football team, graduating in 1944. Later, he graduated from the National War College as well.

Hoopes married twice. His first marriage to Marion Schmidt ended in divorce. They had two sons together: Townsend Walter Hoopes III and Peter Schmidt Hoopes. His second marriage to Ann Merrifield lasted 40 years, until his death. They had a daughter together: Andrea Hoopes DeGirolamo. He also had four stepchildren: Lise Jeantet, Cecily Hoopes Lyons, Briggs Swift Cunningham IV, and F. Thomas B.C. Hoopes. Additionally, he had 11 grandchildren including a grandson bearing his name, Hunter Townsend Hoopes.

Hoopes died in 2004 from complications of melanoma.

== Career ==
During World War II, he served as a Marine Lieutenant in the Pacific theater of the war, participating in the U.S. 5th Marine Division capture of Iwo Jima and the initial occupation of Japan. Afterwards, he became assistant to the chairman of the House Armed Services Committee from 1947 to 1948. He continued as staff aide to three Secretaries of Defense: James Forrestal, General George Marshall and Robert A. Lovett from 1948 to 1953.

He then went on to work in the private sector for a number of years, spending 7 years as partner of an international consulting firm: Cresap, McCormick and Paget.

In 1964, he returned to public service as Deputy Assistant Secretary of Defense for International affairs. From 1965 to 1967, he was Principal Deputy for International Security Affairs at the Pentagon.

Serving as Under Secretary of the Air Force at the Pentagon from 1967 to 1969, he witnessed firsthand the effect of the 1968 Tet Offensive and Lyndon B. Johnson's subsequent decision to de-escalate the war in Vietnam.

After leaving the government, he became fellow at the Woodrow Wilson International Center for Scholars for two years. From 1973 to 1986, Hoopes was president of the Association of American Publishers.

In a telephone conversation between Richard Nixon and Charles Colson, taped on July 1, 1971, Colson relates the news that Lyndon Johnson privately believed that Hoopes had played a role in releasing the Pentagon Papers to the press, and that he would have liked to see Hoopes taken to court by the government alongside various newspapermen. A 1996 article in The New York Times said that the Pentagon Papers had demonstrated, among other things, that the Johnson Administration "systematically lied, not only to the public but also to Congress."

Hoopes also became co-chairman of Americans for SALT, director of the American Committee on U.S. Soviet Relations, and a distinguished international executive at the University of Maryland, College Park. In 2002, he became senior fellow of Washington College.

From the mid-1980s to 1995, Hoopes and his wife ran Hoopes Troupe, a charitable amateur singing group that performed around Washington, D.C., including at the Supreme Court.

== Awards ==
- 1974 Bancroft Prize

== Bibliography ==
Hoopes was a prolific writer of books and articles. His 1969 book The Limits of Intervention (ISBN 0-393-30427-2) is the most widely known. The book deals with the period from 1965 to President Johnson's March 31, 1968 speech ordering a partial bombing halt and announcing that he would not run for re-election. As well as serving as Hoopes's memoir, the book offered an insider's view of the post-Tet Offensive decision-making within the Pentagon, especially that of Secretary of Defense Clark M. Clifford. The book described how the Tet Offensive undermined the support within the government and the country for the strategy of aerial bombardment and ground search-and-destroy missions, fostering instead the view that further escalation of the war was futile. (In a Washington Post article a year later, he acknowledged "that the Tet Offensive was not the shattering military defeat for the U.S. and South Vietnamese forces it appeared to both Washington and the American people.")

The Limits of Intervention also made clear that, from the end of 1965 on, Hoopes favored a change in the Johnson administration's Vietnam policy: "As 1965 came to an end, I had become a great deal more skeptical about the U.S. performance in Vietnam -- about the validity of our stated purposes, the official assessment of the problems we faced, and our ability to control events." (p. 43)

His other writings include:

- The Devil and John Foster Dulles (1973), received Bancroft Prize, ISBN 0-316-37235-8
- Eye Power (1979), written with his wife, ISBN 0-394-50023-7
- Townsend Hoopes on Arms Control (1987), a collection of his essays and speeches, ISBN 0-8191-6622-7
- Townsend Hoopes; Douglas Brinkley (1992). Driven Patriot: The Life and Times of James Forrestal. Naval Institute Press. ISBN 1-55750-334-6.
- Townsend Hoopes; Douglas Brinkley (2000). FDR and the Creation of the U.N. Yale University Press. ISBN 978-0-300-08553-2.
- A Textured Web (2002), fiction, ISBN 1-4010-5401-3

Government offices
Preceded by Norman S. Paul	United States Under Secretary of the Air Force; September 1967 – February 1969	Succeeded by John L. McLucas
