= Lois Rice =

Education policy scholar

- Born: Lois Ann Dickson; February 28, 1933; Portland, Maine, U.S.
- Died: January 4, 2017 (aged 83); Washington, D.C., U.S.
- Education: Harvard University (BA)
- Spouse(s): Emmett J. Rice (divorced); Alfred B. Fitt (1978–1992, his death)
- Children: 2, including Susan

Lois Ann Dickson Fitt Rice (February 28, 1933 – January 4, 2017) was an American corporate executive, scholar, and education policy expert. Known as the "mother of the Pell Grant" because of her work lobbying for its creation, she was national vice president of the College Board from 1973 until 1981. According to the Wall Street Journal, she was "among the first wave of African-American women serving on boards of major US corporations," and under president Bill Clinton, she was a member of the President's Intelligence Advisory Board. For years, she was an economic studies expert at the Brookings Institution concentrating on education policy.

== Early life and education ==
Lois Ann Fitt Rice (née Dickson) was born in Portland, Maine, on February 28, 1933. Her parents were immigrants from Jamaica, her father David working as a janitor and her mother working as a maid. Lois was the youngest of five children, all of whom went to college.

Lois was a 1950 graduate of Portland High School. She was the yearbook editor, student council president, valedictorian, "Most Likely to Succeed", "Most Valuable Female" in her class, and a national debate champion. Her parents encouraged her to pursue higher education, and Rice earned a bachelor's degree at Radcliffe College of Harvard University in 1954 in history and literature. She was one of three Black women in her graduating class. At Radcliffe, she was elected to Phi Beta Kappa and would later be a trustee. She was a Woodrow Wilson Fellow at Columbia University and has honorary degrees from both Brown University and Bowdoin College.

== Public service career ==
=== College Board and Pell Grant ===
In 1959, she joined the College Board and was a "longtime member of the College Board,” originally known during her time with the organization as the College Entrance Examination Board. She was an executive of the organization in 1972, when she pushed for the creation of the Basic Educational Opportunity Grant program. It was later renamed the Pell Program, and was widely enacted in the United States to help fund undergraduate educations. Rice was a major lobbyist for the creation of the Pell Grant, and according to The Washington Post, she was known as the “mother of the Pell Grant” for her role in helping create the program. According to Clay Pell IV, “This program was not inevitable, and it would not have come into existence without her, nor survived in the decades since without her passionate advocacy.” After the Pell Grant program was established, she remained director of the College Board's Washington Office, and was its national vice president from 1973 until 1981. During this time, she continued to promote the Pell program.

=== Other organizations ===
Early in her career prior to joining the College Board, Rice directed the National Scholarship Service's counseling services. In 1978, she continued to head the College Entrance Examination Board's policy research office in Washington, D.C. Rice served on school boards with Madeleine Albright, a friend of hers.

In 1992, she was a guest scholar at Brookings Institution, where she “led studies on federal higher-education policies", and also oversaw "an initiative to promote racial diversity at public policy organizations”. For years she then worked as an economic studies expert at the Brookings Institution, concentrating on education policy. She was also director of the Think Tank Consortium at Brookings. She published a number of papers on federal higher education policy during her career. Among them was “Subsidizing Higher Education Through Tax and Spending Programs,” coauthored for the Urban-Brookings Tax Policy Center.

== Business career ==
According to The Wall Street Journal, she was “among the first wave of African-American women serving on boards of major U.S. corporations”. During her business career, she served on the boards of companies and nonprofits such as Firestone, McGraw-Hill, and Control Data Corporation. She was also a trustee of the Urban Institute and the Center for Naval Analyses. Under president Bill Clinton, she was a member of the president's Foreign Intelligence Advisory Board. She was also on the boards or councils of UNUM, Fleet Bank, Hartford Steam Boiler Insurance Company, and the Commercial Credit Company. She was a member of the Carnegie Council on Higher Education, and at Harvard she was the chairwoman of the visiting committee to the African American studies program.

Beyond serving on the board, she was a senior vice president of Control Data Corporation. She oversaw the company's “interface in federal and state government public affairs and policies.”

== Personal life ==
Rice was married to Emmett J. Rice, the second African-American governor of the Federal Reserve System. They had two children, E. John Rice Jr. and Susan Rice. The family spent the children's youth living in Shepherd Park in Northwest, Washington, D.C. She divorced Rice when her daughter, Susan, was ten years old. On January 7, 1978, Rice married Alfred B. Fitt, who died in 1992. With Fitt, she had four stepchildren: Cathleen, Benjamin, Craig, and Ann. Lois Rice died on January 4, 2017, in a hospital in Washington, D.C., of pneumonia and cancer.

== Notable publications ==
- Lois Fitt Rice and Arthur Hauptman, 2000. "Moving Beyond Student Aid."
- Lois Fitt Rice, Elaine Maag, David Mundel, and Kim Rueben, 2007."Subsidizing Higher Education Through Tax and Spending Programs."
- Lois Fitt Rice and David Mundel, 2008. "The Impact of Increases in Pell Grant Awards on College-going among Lower Income Youth."
