= Daniel Gaul =

American judge

Personal details
- Born: 1953 (age 72–73)
- Party: Democratic
- Education: Cleveland State University; Capital University Law School (J.D.)
- Occupation: Judge; Attorney

Daniel Gaul (born 1953) is an American judge for the Cuyahoga County Common Pleas Court. Gaul was first elected to the court in 1991.

== Early life and education ==
Gaul was born in 1953. Gaul attended Notre Dame-Cathedral Latin School in Chardon, Ohio. After completing high school, Gaul attended Cleveland State University, receiving an undergraduate degree in 1977. Gaul later attended Capital University Law School and graduated with a juris doctor in 1981. He was admitted to the Ohio State Bar Association in 1981.

== Career ==
Following his admission to the Ohio State Bar Association in 1981, Gaul began his career in private practice. In 1991, Gaul began serving as a judge for the Cuyahoga County Common Pleas Court.

On October 7, 2010, the Ohio Supreme Court suspended Gaul for threatening to jail a defendant he thought was intimidating an elderly witness. In the 2007 trial, Gaul had threatened to have the witness "bound and gagged" and accused him of crimes including obstruction of justice, kidnapping, and smoking crack. The Ohio Supreme Court stayed the one-year suspension pending good behavior, allowing Gaul to continue working as a judge during the period.

In 2012, Gaul won the general election for the judgeship against Edele Passalacqua with 69.81 percent of the vote.

In 2017, the Eighth District Court of Appeals determined that Gaul had coerced a man, Carlton Heard, into pleading no contest to attempted murder, felonious assault, aggravated robbery, and other charges related to an October 2015 drive-by shooting. Gaul had sentenced Heard to fourteen years in prison after coercing him into the plea. The Eighth District court overturned Heard's plea and ordered that the case be assigned to a different judge. In the new trial, Heard was acquitted by a jury.

In 2018, Gaul was featured on the true crime podcast Serial, which criticized him for his treatment of Black defendants, including using racial stereotypes, threatening to incarcerate defendants who were on probation for having children out of wedlock, and referring to Black defendants as "brother." Gaul was interviewed by producer Sarah Koenig and told her that he prefers to give defendants probation so that he has more control and supervision over the defendants who come through his courtroom. On November 6, 2018, Gaul was reelected in Cuyahoga County General Election, receiving 54.7 percent of the vote.

In 2019, the Eighth District Court of Appeals again overturned one of Gaul's decisions after determining that Gaul improperly questioned a defendant, William Skerkavich Jr., about his juvenile and misdemeanor criminal history. The Eighth District determined that, "Based on the record before this court, we find this to be a clear example of bias and prejudice on the part of the trial court...It is also clear that the trial court abandoned its duty as an impartial factfinder and interrogated appellant on matters, not only inadmissible, but wholly immaterial to the instant case." During the trial, Gaul had asked Skerkavich more than eighty-three questions. The Eighth District Court of Appeals ordered Skerkavich's case to be heard by a different judge at the Cuyahoga County Common Pleas Court. Gaul was also criticized in August 2019 for granting an early release to an attorney who had sexually abused an eleven-year-old boy.

In March 2021, Gaul threatened to hold the North Royalton police chief in contempt of court at an early release hearing for a man convicted of attacking a female officer. In December 2021, a thirty-page complaint was filed against Gaul in the Ohio Supreme Court accusing Gaul of five instances of misconduct between 2014 and 2020, including coercing a plea, inappropriate communication with an incarcerated defendant, improper questioning, taking the position of biased advocate, and violations to the Ohio Code of Judicial Conduct and Ohio Rules of Professional Conduct.

In December 2023, the Ohio Supreme Court suspended Gaul for a period of one year. The basis for the suspension were eight counts of judicial misconduct which arose from seven criminal matters and one civil-stalking-protection-order case. The misconduct, which occurred over a period of more than five years fell into one of six main categories: (1) coercing pleas, (2) aggressive questioning of a criminal defendant, (3) making demeaning comments to criminal defendants and other persons in a court room, (4) abusing the prestige of judicial office to advance the personal interests of others, (5) refusing to grant release from confinement and disregarding appellate-court orders, and (6) abusing contempt power. Writing for the majority, Chief Justice Sharon Kennedy wrote that Gaul's actions "[r]ather than promoting confidence in the independence, integrity, and impartiality of the judiciary, Gaul’s conduct has called those essential elements of our justice system into question while harming multiple litigants." Gaul's suspension for a year, effective December 29, 2023, essentially removes him from the bench as he was elected to his last six year term in 2018 since he reached the mandatory retirement age in 2023.
