= Jack Guttenberg =

American jurist (born 1951)

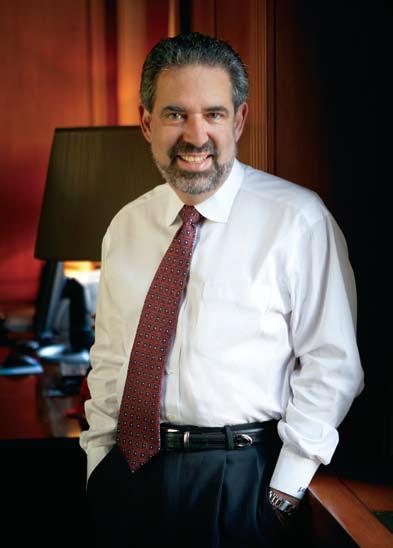
- Born: (1951); Tokyo, Japan
- Education: University of Michigan (B.A.); Wayne State University School of Law (J.D.)
- Notable work: Ohio Law of Professional Conduct
- Awards: David D. White Award

Jack Aaron Guttenberg (born 1951) is an American jurist, legal scholar, and professor of law, who served as Dean of Capital University Law School from 2004 to 2010. He guided the school through implementation of the strategic plan, Building on our Momentum, Securing our Future.

Born in Detroit, Guttenberg earned his undergraduate degree in sociology from the University of Michigan and his J.D. from Wayne State University School of Law. After graduation, he worked as an associate at Burgess & Burgess, a criminal defense firm in Detroit, and as an assistant public defender in the Major Felonies Division in Ann Arbor, Michigan. Before joining Capital University Law School, Guttenberg also served as associate dean and professor at Cleveland-Marshall College of Law.

Guttenberg's most recent scholarly works have focused on ethics and professional responsibility. He is a co-author of the authoritative source on the Ohio new law of professional conduct for attorneys, Ohio Law of Professional Conduct.

== Education and early legal career ==
Born in 1951, Guttenberg grew up in Detroit, Michigan. He earned a B.A. with honors in sociology from the University of Michigan.In 1976, he graduated from Wayne State University Law School with a Juris Doctor, graduating magna cum laude.

For a year after graduation, Guttenberg worked as an associate at the criminal defense law firm Burgess & Burgess of Detroit. He also served as an assistant public defender in the Major Felonies Division in Ann Arbor, Michigan, from 1977 to 1980. Guttenberg tried 25 to 30 cases ranging from misdemeanors to homicides, rapes, and armed robberies. In 1980, he became a professor of law at the Cleveland-Marshall College of Law at Cleveland State University. While still teaching, Guttenberg accepted a position of Cleveland-Marshall's associate dean in 1997.

== Capital University Law School ==
On July 1, 2004, Guttenberg became dean of Capital University Law School. The school had been struggling with low bar exam scores, a need to expand, and alumni indifference. Guttenberg appointed a committee to design a new strategic plan for the Law School, which resulted in a new strategic plan titled Building on our Momentum, Securing our Future.

As dean, Guttenberg undertook a variety of steps to enhance the academic program and to address the low performance on the bar exam, including reduction and stabilization of the entering class size by consciously limiting enrollment and creating smaller section courses meeting several times per week to improve student-faculty interaction. Guttenberg retained one of the nation's first professors of bar services, and Capital was one of the first law schools in the country to offer a for-credit bar review class. Guttenberg also emphasized the importance of writing skills. Capital graduates taking the bar for the first time in July 2006 passed at a rate of 87 percent, a significant improvement over the 2004 rate of 74 percent, and sufficient to place the school third in Ohio. This figure improved to 89 percent at the July 2007 examination, and to 94 percent on the exam in July 2008, placing Capital Law School first in the state.

Guttenberg also focused on faculty development by, among other things, improving the status of Legal Writing and Legal Drafting faculty, creating a position of Associate Dean/Director of Faculty Development. In a 2008 survey of faculty scholarship, conducted by Roger Williams University, Capital Law School faculty ranked as one of the most productive scholarly faculties in the nation. Guttenberg also undertook to revive the then inactive Alumni Association., and engaged in a planning process to reconstitute his advisory Board of Counselors.

Guttenberg hosted annual Alumni Weekends with the aim of creating networking opportunities among former students and to develop connections between the Law School and its graduates. In addition, Capital's graduates and friends could sign-up for Capital eBriefs, an online newsletter, published 4 to 6 times throughout the year.

Guttenberg stepped down as dean of Capital University Law School on June 30, 2010, at the completion of the school's strategic plan, and having won improvement in a variety of key areas. When Guttenberg announced his plans to resign from the post, he asserted, "I look forward to...taking on new professional challenges as a teacher, scholar, administrator, and advocate for accessible legal education." Guttenberg returned to teaching criminal law, professional responsibility, and remedies at Capital University Law School.

== Award ==
On April 19, 2011, Guttenberg was honored with the 22nd Annual David D. White Award. This award commemorates David D. White, the first African-American graduate of Capital University Law School. The award honors an individual who has made a significant contribution to African-American community. Guttenberg was recognized for his efforts to help students prepare for the bar exam, constantly engaging students, and strengthening ties with alumni.

== Publications ==
Guttenberg's scholarship focuses on ethics and professional responsibility.

=== Books ===
Guttenberg, Jack A., and M. Thomas. Depositions (Ohio). Knowles Law Book Publishing Co. (1985)

Guttenberg, Jack A., and L. Snyder. The Law of Professional Responsibility in Ohio. Anderson Publishing Co. (1992)

Guttenberg, Jack A., and L. Snyder. 1998 Supplement to The Law of Professional Responsibility in Ohio. Anderson Publishing Co. (1998)

Guttenberg, Jack A., S. Becker., L. Snyder. Anderson's Ohio Law of Professional Conduct. LexisNexus (2007 ed.), (2009 ed.), (2012 ed. forthcoming) - The work is a new authoritative source of professional conduct in the state of Ohio. On February 1, 2007, the Ohio Rules of Professional Conduct replaced the Ohio Code of Professional Responsibility, a set of standards that governed professional conduct since 1970. In this work, Guttenberg and his co-authors from Cleveland-Marshall College of Law describe the new standards and explain which rules differ from previous standards. While noticing some important features of the new rules, the author reveals how changes in the rules improve the clarity of the former Code's substantive standards. The book covers such issues as unauthorized practice of law; lawyer discipline; conflicts of interest; client confidentiality; responsibility to clients; and responsibilities in adversarial and adjudicative settings.

=== Book chapter ===
Guttenberg, Jack A. Federal Post Conviction Relief in Prisoners Self-Help Litigation Manual. Oceana Publications Inc. (1983)

=== Law review articles ===
Guttenberg, Jack A. Recent Changes in Ohio Sentencing Law: The Question Left Unanswered. 15 Toledo Law Review. 35 (1983)

Guttenberg, Jack A. Federal Habeas Corpus, Constitutional Rights, and Procedural Forfeitures: the Delicate Balance. 12 Hofstra Law Review. 617 (1984)

Guttenberg, Jack A. The Ohio Attorney Disciplinary Process, 1982 to 1991: An Empirical Study, Critique, and Recommendations for Change. 62 University of Cincinnati Law Review. 947 (1994)

Guttenberg, Jack A. Practicing Law in the 21st Century in a 20th (19th) Century Straightjacket: Something Has to Give. Michigan State Law Review. (2012)
