= Frederica Freyberg =

American television anchor and producer

Frederica Freyberg is an American television anchor and producer who currently hosts Here and Now on PBS Wisconsin.

A Madison native, Freyberg is the daughter of esteemed UW Law School professor and former United Nations official Carlisle Runge. Freyberg attended school for a time in Switzerland. Freyberg attended Sarah Lawrence College and the University of Wisconsin-Madison, and was a reporter at NBC 15, WFRV and Milwaukee Public Television. She was a general assignment reporter at WCCO in the Twin Cities in the late 1990s. In 2002, Freyberg became the Capitol reporter for Wisconsin Public Radio.

In her role with PBS Wisconsin, Freyberg has interviewed the state's biggest newsmakers, moderated debates between candidates for Wisconsin's highest offices, and produced various hourlong documentaries. In 2011, Freyberg received a Midwest Emmy for Outstanding Achievement for News Specialty Report/Series for her story on the tumult surrounding the Act 10 budget repair bill in Wisconsin. Freyberg was named one of the top journalists in the state by the Milwaukee Press Club and is a three-time recipient of the Edward R. Murrow Award.
