= Shannen W. Coffin =

American attorney

Shannen Wayne Coffin (born September 19, 1969) is an American attorney for the Washington, D.C. law firm Steptoe & Johnson LLP who until early November 2007 served as general counsel to American Vice President Dick Cheney. Coffin was previously at the Department of Justice, where he served as a Deputy Assistant Attorney General of the Civil Division.

Prior to joining the Justice Department, Coffin had worked for Steptoe & Johnson in its Supreme Court and appellate practice. He clerked for Judge David B. Sentelle on the U.S. Court of Appeals for the D.C. Circuit in the 1994–1995 term.

Coffin came to national attention when his correspondence with U.S. Senator Patrick Leahy of Vermont surfaced in regard to the NSA warrantless surveillance controversy that became public in August 2007.

Coffin is married to Casey Coffin and has written articles for National Review's website and publications for the Federalist Society.

He grew up in Springhill in northernmost Webster Parish, Louisiana.
