= Steptoe LLP =

International law firm headquartered in Washington, D.C

- Headquarters: Washington, D.C.
- No. of offices: 9
- No. of attorneys: > 500
- Major practice areas: General practice
- Key people: Gwendolyn Prothro Renigar (Chairwoman)
- Date founded: 1913
- Founder: Philip Pendleton Steptoe, Louis A. Johnson
- Company type: Limited liability partnership
- Website: www.steptoe.com

Steptoe LLP (formerly known as Steptoe & Johnson LLP) is an international law firm headquartered in Washington, D.C. It maintains offices in New York City, Los Angeles, Chicago, Houston, San Francisco, London, Brussels, Beijing, and Hong Kong.

== History ==
Philip Steptoe and Louis A. Johnson, both graduates of the University of Virginia School of Law, and John Rixie formed Steptoe, Rixey, & Johnson in 1913 in Clarksburg, West Virginia. The following year, Rixey left the firm, which became Steptoe & Johnson.

In 1928, Steptoe & Johnson opened an office in Charleston, West Virginia, to meet the expanding legislative and regulatory work available in the state capital. Meanwhile, Johnson, a veteran of World War I, helped found the American Legion, bringing national prominence to himself and the firm when he served as the organization's commander in the mid-1930s. President Franklin D. Roosevelt appointed Johnson as United States Assistant Secretary of War in 1937.

After leaving the Roosevelt administration, Johnson opened the Washington D.C., office of Steptoe & Johnson in 1945. In March 1949, President Harry S. Truman appointed Johnson as United States Secretary of Defense, and he served in that job until September 1950.

The firm's Washington office grew quickly under Johnson's influence. Amongst its first clients were members of the growing airline industry, as well as pipelines, railroads, and foreign companies whose assets had been seized during World War II. In assisting these clients, Steptoe & Johnson became known as a prominent firm in regulatory law, tax, and international trade.

In 1980, the firm separated into two firms, with the DC-based firm being called Steptoe & Johnson Chartered (now Steptoe LLP) and the founding firm remaining a West Virginia partnership called Steptoe & Johnson (now Steptoe & Johnson PLLC).

In 1987, a combination of client needs and business opportunities led to the opening of a Steptoe & Johnson office in Phoenix. Since 1997, the firm has opened offices in Los Angeles (1997), London (2001), Brussels (2002), New York (2005), Chicago (2007), Beijing (2010), and Palo Alto (2014; relocated to San Francisco in 2017).

Steptoe attorneys have frequently served in high-level government positions, and are often quoted on current business, political, and legal happenings in national media. The firm is notable for being one of the first to establish a blockchain practice and to accept payment in bitcoin.

In November 2021, Gwendolyn Prothro Renigar was elected as the firm's new chairperson.

In December 2023, the firm removed reference to Johnson in its registered legal name and rebranded as Steptoe LLP.

== Pro bono ==
Steptoe ranked 19th among Am Law 200 firms in The American Lawyer's 2015 pro bono report, based on average hours spent on and breadth of commitment to pro bono work. The firm's pro bono efforts have been recognized by the Animal Legal Defense Fund, the John Carroll Society, the Children's Law Center, the Lex Mundi Pro Bono Foundation, and the ABA Death Penalty Representation Project, among others.

== Reputation ==
Steptoe is an American "white shoe" law firm and according to the Am Law 100 is the 93rd highest-grossing law firm worldwide.

== Notable current and former attorneys ==
- Stephen Ailes, former United States under secretary of the Army and former United States secretary of the Army.
- Shara L. Aranoff, former chairman of the United States International Trade Commission.
- Bruce Babbitt, former United States secretary of the interior and Governor of Arizona.
- Stewart Baker, former general counsel of the National Security Agency and first assistant secretary for policy at United States Department of Homeland Security.
- John D. Bates, U.S. district court judge for the United States District Court for the District of Columbia.
- David S. Biderman, executive director and CEO, Solid Waste Association of North America.
- Steve Bullock, former governor of Montana.
- Paul K. Charlton, former prosecutor.
- Shannen W. Coffin, general counsel to Vice President of the United States Dick Cheney.
- Alan D. Cohn, former assistant secretary for strategy, planning, analysis and risk of the United States Department of Homeland Security
- Luis Fortuño, former governor of Puerto Rico.
- Jerome Holmes, federal judge on the United States Court of Appeals for the Tenth Circuit.
- Louis A. Johnson, former United States secretary of defense and former assistant secretary of war.
- J. Bennett Johnston, former United States senator for Louisiana.
- Robert E. Jordan III, former general counsel of the Army.
- Debra L. Lee, chairman and CEO of Black Entertainment Television (BET).
- Monroe Leigh, former legal advisor of the Department of State under Henry Kissinger.
- Wilma A. Lewis, chief judge of the District Court of the Virgin Islands and first female United States attorney for the District of Columbia
- Ken Ludwig, theatre director and playwright.
- Darryl Nirenberg, U.S. ambassador to Romania.
- Shirley D. Peterson, former assistant attorney general in the Tax Division of the United States Department of Justice and former commissioner of the Internal Revenue Service.
- Intisar Rabb, professor at Harvard Law School.
- John Rizzo, former CIA general counsel.
- John Shadegg, former U.S. representative for Arizona's 3rd congressional district.
- Laurence Silberman, United States federal judge for United States Court of Appeals for the District of Columbia Circuit.
- Karl Tilleman, former member of the Canadian National Basketball Team who played in the 1984 and 1988 Olympics; current Olympic record-holder for the most three-point baskets in a single game.
- Richard Verma, United States Ambassador to India and former assistant secretary of state for legislative affairs.
- Kimba Wood, federal judge for the United States District Court for the Southern District of New York.

== See also ==
- List of largest United States-based law firms by profits per partner
