= Robert E. Jordan III =

American lawyer

Robert Jordan

General Counsel of the Army
- In office 1967–1971
- President: Lyndon B. Johnson
- Preceded by: Alfred B. Fitt
- Succeeded by: Robert W. Berry

Personal details
- Born: Robert Elijah Jordan III; June 20, 1936
- Died: May 14, 2010 (aged 73) Sarasota, Florida, U.S.
- Education: Massachusetts Institute of Technology (BS); Harvard University (JD)

Military service
- Branch/service: United States Army
- Years of service: 1961–1963

Robert Elijah Jordan III (1936–2010) was an American lawyer who served as General Counsel of the Army from 1967 to 1971.

== Early life and education ==
Robert E. Jordan III was born on June 20, 1936. He was educated at the Massachusetts Institute of Technology, receiving an S.B. degree in 1958. He then attended Harvard Law School, receiving a Juris Doctor in 1961. During his time in law school, he was an editor of the Harvard Law Review.

== Career ==
Jordan served as an officer in the United States Army from 1961 to 1963. In 1963, he served as Staff Director of the President’s Committee on Equal Opportunity in the Armed Forces. He was then Special Assistant for Civil Rights in the Office of the United States Secretary of Defense from 1963 to 1964. From 1964 to 1965, he was an Assistant United States Attorney for the United States District Court for the District of Columbia. He moved to the Office of the United States Secretary of the Treasury in 1965, serving as Executive Assistant for Enforcement. In 1967, he became Assistant General Counsel of the United States Department of the Army, and was promoted to General Counsel of the Army later in 1967, holding that position until 1971.

Jordan left government service in 1971, joining the Washington, D.C., law firm of Steptoe & Johnson as a partner, a position he would hold until his death. He specialized in complex civil litigation. He was active in the District of Columbia Bar, serving as that organization's president from 1987 to 1988. He also served as Steptoe & Johnson's managing partner for a number of years.

== Death ==
Jordan died in Sarasota, Florida, on May 14, 2010, at age 73 after a lengthy illness.

== Works ==
- "Alternatives Under NEPA: Toward an Accommodation", Ecology Law Quarterly, Volume 3, No. 4 (Fall 1973), pp. 705–757.
- Chapter 9, "Ethical Issues Arising From Present or Past Government Service" in Professional Responsibility: A Guide for Attorneys (American Bar Association, 1978).
- "Disqualification of Counsel in Litigation", Litigation, Volume 7, No. 3 (1981).
- "Eye on Ethics -- The New Rules", The Washington Lawyer (November/December 1990).

Government offices
Preceded by Alfred B. Fitt	General Counsel of the Army; 1967–1971	Succeeded by ???
