= Marine Corps Individual Reserve Support Activity =

Coordinates: 38°51′00″N 94°33′00″W

The Marine Corps Individual Reserve Support Activity (MCIRSA) is a subordinate unit within Marine Forces Reserve (MARFORRES) that provides support for all Individual Ready Reserve (IRR), Individual Mobilization Augmentee (IMA) and Mobilized Training Unit Marine reservists. It falls under the Force Headquarters Group.

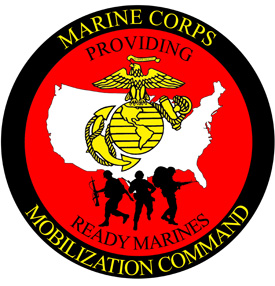
MOBCOM logo

== Individual Ready Reserve ==
MCIRSA exercises centralized command and administration of the IRR. The IRR is composed of former active duty or reserve component personnel who have not completed their military service obligation (MSO) or have completed their MSO and are in the ready reserve by voluntary agreement.

== Garrison ==
Richards-Gebaur Air Force Base

== Synopsis of IRR Obligations ==
Marines in the IRR are required to contact MCIRSA and submit any changes to current address, e-mail address, phone number, dependents, marital status, and health/VA status via [www.mol.usmc.mil] or contacting MOBCOM customer service at [CSC@cdc.usmc.mil] or 800-255-5082 ext 3395. They are required to physically or virtually muster when directed. Also must maintain basic uniform items.

=== Reserve Contractual Service Requirements ===
Officers must resign their commission after completion of 8-year MSO to be released from the ready reserve. Enlisted personnel in good standing must re-enlist to remain in the IRR past their 8-year MSO. They must also maintain standards of conduct, may only wear Marine Corps uniforms in accordance with regulations, maintain military identification card and are eligible for involuntary recall to active duty—although most IRR members are not recalled while in their first or last year in the IRR.

=== Individual Mobilization Augmentee (IMA) ===
MCIRSA oversees and administers the IMA program on order to provide ready Marines for individual augmentation to both active and reserve missions. IMA Marines perform a minimum of 48 paid drill periods per fiscal year and a minimum of 12 paid days of active duty for training per fiscal year with their assigned unit. Members of the IMA may receive retirement pay and benefits at age 60 if they accumulate 20 qualifying years of service.

=== Mobilization Training Unit (MTU) ===
MCIRSA oversees and administers the MTU program. An MTU is a unit established to provide operational support in a non-pay status. MTU Marines, as drilling reservists, perform a minimum of 40 non-paid drill periods per fiscal year with their assigned unit. Members of the MTU may receive retirement pay and benefits at age 60 if they accumulate 20 qualifying years of service.

=== MCIRSA Mission ===
Contact, accept, track, screen, and prepare Marines so they are ready for active duty. Provide Ready Marines!

=== MCIRSA Vision ===
MCIRSA provides the active forces competent and effective individual reserve Marines (IRRs), capable of seamlessly integrating with the active forces in order to enhance the operational reach and endurance of the Marine Corps.

- It also prepares Marines for potential return to active duty. It contacts and engages Marines at the conclusion of their active duty obligation and throughout their reserve career, ensuring they are aware of reserve obligations and opportunities for future service.
- IRR and IMA Marines will continue to meet DOD mandated obligations.
- MCIRSA educates thousands of Marines on IRR obligations and opportunities as they transitioned from the active component to the IRR.

Formerly known as Marine Corps Reserve Support Command (MCRSC) and Marine Corps Mobilization Command (MOBCOM), MCIRSA is located on Marine Corps Support Facility in New Orleans, Louisiana.

== See also ==
- Organization of the United States Marine Corps
