= Thomas F. Hall =

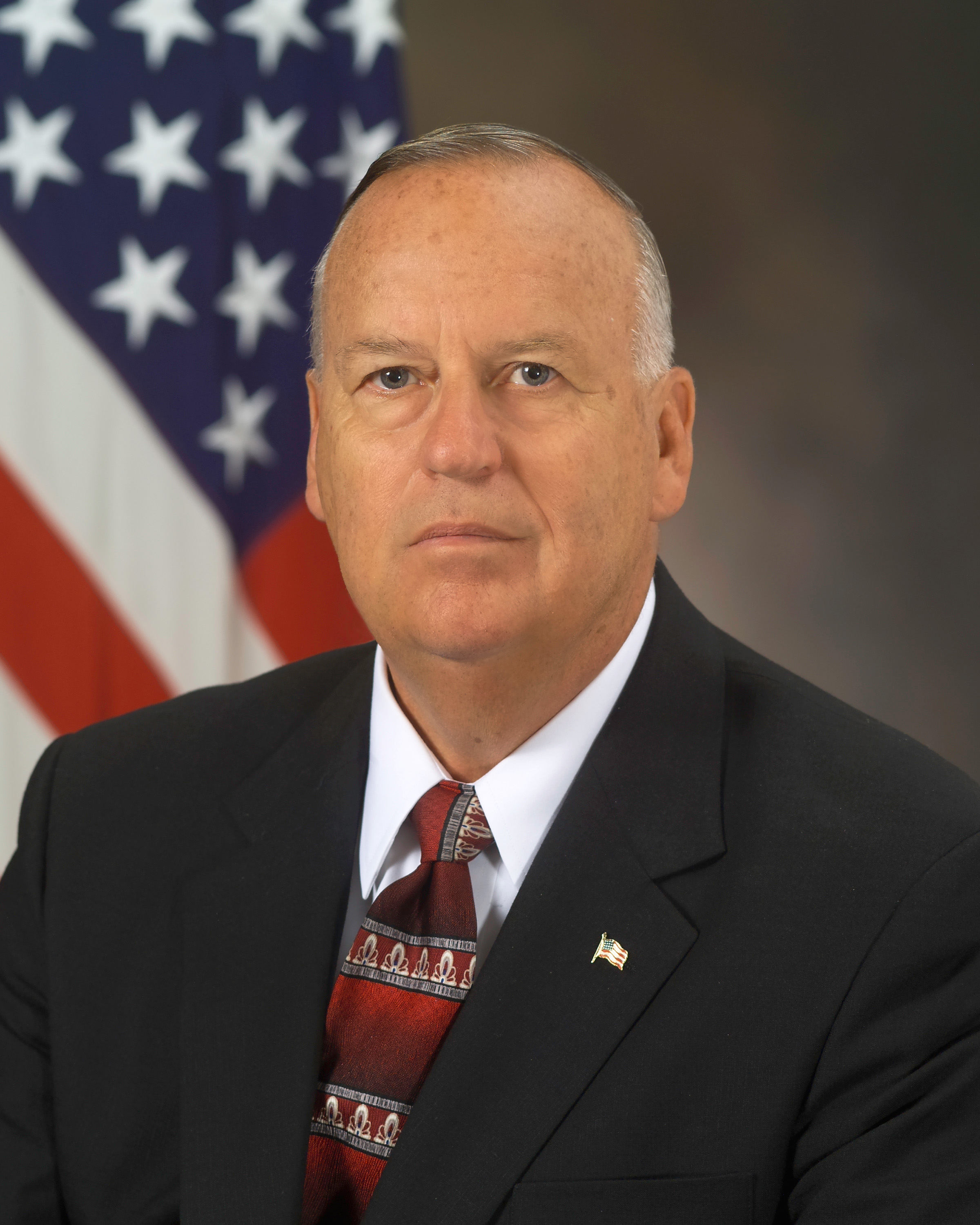
- Born: December 27, 1939 (age 86); Barnsdall, Oklahoma
- Military career
- Allegiance: United States
- Branch: United States Navy
- Service years: 1963–1996
- Rank: Rear Admiral
- Commands: United States Naval Reserve; Naval Air Station Bermuda; VP-8
- Conflicts: Vietnam War
- Awards: Navy Distinguished Service Medal; Defense Superior Service Medal; Legion of Merit (2)
- Other work: Assistant Secretary of Defense for Reserve Affairs (2002–2009)

Thomas Forrest Hall (born December 27, 1939) is a retired rear admiral of the United States Navy who served as the fourth Assistant Secretary of Defense for Reserve Affairs from October 9, 2002 to 2009. A Presidential appointee confirmed by the United States Senate, he served as the principal staff assistant to the United States Secretary of Defense on all matters involving the 1.2 million members of the Reserve Components of the United States Armed Forces. He was responsible for overall supervision of Reserve Component affairs of the Department of Defense.

== Early life and education ==
Hall was born in Barnsdall, Oklahoma on December 27, 1939. He attended Oklahoma State University for one year before entering the United States Naval Academy in Annapolis, Maryland. In 1963, he graduated from the academy with a bachelor's degree in Engineering and was named as one of the top 25 leaders in his class, having commanded both the top Battalion and Company. He was also awarded the Brigade Intramural Sports Trophy. In 1971, he received a master's degree in Public Personnel Management from George Washington University. He graduated with highest distinction from the Naval War College; with distinction, from the National War College; and from the National Security Course at Harvard University. He was selected as a Fellow and served on the Chief of Naval Operations Strategic Studies Group.

== Naval career ==
Hall served almost 34 years of continuous active duty in the United States Navy. He is a distinguished and decorated Naval Aviator, who served a combat tour in Vietnam. He has performed in numerous high level staff, command, and NATO positions during his career. He commanded Patrol Squadron Eight, Naval Air Station Bermuda, and dual-hatted as Commander of Fleet Air Keflavik and the Iceland Defense Force. His final military assignment was as the Commander/Director/Chief of Naval Reserve.

Hall's military awards include the Navy Distinguished Service Medal, Defense Superior Service Medal, Legion of Merit, Meritorious Service Medal, Air Medal, and various other personal and unit decorations. He was awarded the Order of the Falcon, with Commander's Cross, by the President of Iceland in recognition of his accomplishments and service as Commander Iceland Defense Force. In 2000, he was given the International Partnership Award for his service to the United States and Iceland. He has been inducted into the Oklahoma Military Hall of Fame. In 2003, he was given the National Service Award for Leadership by the Federal Law Enforcement Foundation. In 2004, he was given the National Citizenship Award by the Military Chaplains Association of the United States of America. In 2005, he was given the Admiral Jackson Award by the Reserve Officers Association.

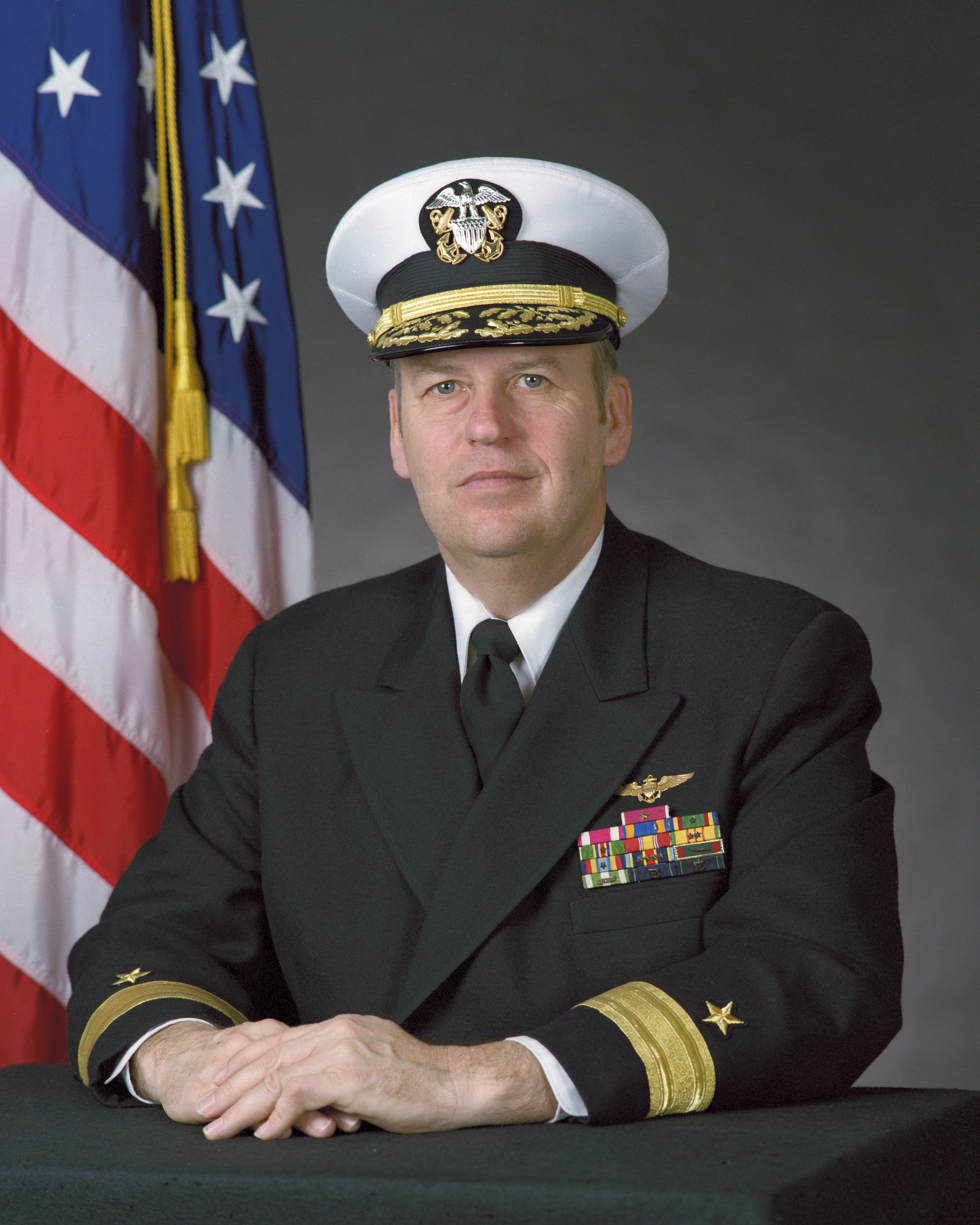
Rear Admiral Hall

=== Nonprofit Service ===
Hall served on the Boards of Directors of numerous nonprofit organizations that support the needs of US veterans and citizens in general. Prior to returning to government service, Secretary Hall served as the Executive Director of the Naval Reserve Association for six years. The Naval Reserve Association is a 501 (c) (3) nonprofit veterans' organization that represents over 23,000 Navy Reserve officers, members, and their families.
