= Norman S. Paul =

United States Under Secretary of the Air Force
- In office October 1, 1965 – September 30, 1967
- Preceded by: Brockway McMillan
- Succeeded by: Townsend Hoopes

Assistant Secretary of Defense for Force Management Policy
- In office August 8, 1962 – September 30, 1965
- President: John F. Kennedy; Lyndon B. Johnson
- Preceded by: Carlisle Runge
- Succeeded by: Thomas D. Morris

Assistant Secretary of Defense for Legislative Affairs
- In office January 25, 1961 – June 30, 1962
- President: John F. Kennedy
- Preceded by: James D. Hittle
- Succeeded by: David E. McGiffert

Personal details
- Born: Norman Stark Paul; March 23, 1919
- Died: March 30, 1978 (aged 59) Washington, D.C., U.S.
- Cause of death: Cancer
- Education: Yale College

Norman Stark Paul (March 23, 1919 – March 30, 1978) was United States Assistant Secretary of Defense for Legislative Affairs from January 25, 1961, to June 30, 1962; Assistant Secretary of Defense for Force Management Policy from August 8, 1962, to September 30, 1965; and United States Under Secretary of the Air Force from October 1965 to September 1967. He died of cancer in Washington, D.C., on May 30, 1978, at the age of 59.

Paul was a member of the Yale College Class of 1940.

Government offices
Preceded by Brockway McMillan	United States Under Secretary of the Air Force; October 1965 – September 1967	Succeeded by Townsend Hoopes
