= Alfred B. Fitt =

American lawyer (1923–1992)

Assistant Secretary of Defense for Manpower and Reserve Affairs
- In office 1967–1969
- President: Lyndon B. Johnson

General Counsel of the Army
- In office 1964–1967
- Preceded by: Joseph A. Califano Jr.
- Succeeded by: Robert E. Jordan III

Personal details
- Born: Alfred Bradley Fitt; April 12, 1923 Highland Park, Illinois, U.S.
- Died: July 7, 1992 (aged 69) Washington, D.C., U.S.
- Spouse(s): Patricia Hewitt; Lois Dickinson Rice (1978–1992)
- Children: 4
- Education: Yale University (BA); University of Michigan (LLB)

Alfred Bradley Fitt (April 12, 1923 – July 7, 1992) was an American attorney who served as General Counsel of the Army from 1964 to 1967, as Assistant Secretary of Defense for Manpower and Reserve Affairs from 1967 to 1969, and as general counsel of the Congressional Budget Office from 1975 to 1992.

== Early life and education ==
Alfred B. Fitt was born in Highland Park, Illinois, on April 12, 1923. He was educated at Yale University, receiving a B.A. in 1946. He then attended the University of Michigan Law School, received a LLB in 1948. He was admitted to the bar in 1948.

== Career ==
In 1948, Fitt became an associate at the Detroit law firm of Lewis & Watkins. He became a partner in the firm in 1952. In 1954, he left Lewis & Watkins to become a legal adviser to the governor of Michigan, G. Mennen Williams. In 1960, he moved to Washington, D.C., to become associate counsel of the United States Senate Judiciary Subcommittee on Administrative Oversight and the Courts. In 1961, he became chief counsel of the Special Committee on FAA Procedures.

Later in 1961, Fitt joined the United States Department of the Army as Deputy Under Secretary of the Army for Manpower. He served as Deputy Assistant Secretary of Defense for Civil Rights as 1963 to 1964. From 1964 to 1967, he served as General Counsel of the Army. He was Assistant Secretary of Defense for Manpower and Reserve Affairs from October 9, 1967, to February 20, 1969.

Fitt was heavily involved in the execution of the manpower programs Project 100,000 and Project Transition in the Johnson administration. Fitt continued to communicate with former Secretary of Defense Robert McNamara on the progress of these programs given McNamara's personal devotion to them.

Fitt left government service in 1969 to become President of Yale Kingman Brewster Jr.'s special assistant for community and alumni affairs.

In 1975, Fitt left Yale to become the first general counsel of the Congressional Budget Office, a position he would hold for the next seventeen years.

== Personal life ==
Fitt was married twice. His second wife, Lois Dickson Rice (1933–2017), married Fitt in 1977, four years after her divorce from Emmett J. Rice, making Fitt the stepfather of Susan Rice. Fitt died on July 7, 1992, at the age of 69.

== Works ==
- "The National Guard and Civil Disturbance", City (August/September 1970), pp. 41–43.
- "The Buckley Amendment: Understanding It, Living with It", The College Board Review, No. 96, Summer 1975, 2 & 3
- Social Security Benefits for Students (1977).
- "In Search of a Just Outcome", Change, Vol. 9, No. 10 (Oct., 1977), pp. 22–25, 59.

Government offices
Preceded by Joseph A. Califano Jr.	General Counsel of the Army; 1964 – 1967	Succeeded by Robert E. Jordan III
