= Frederick E. Vollrath =

United States Army general

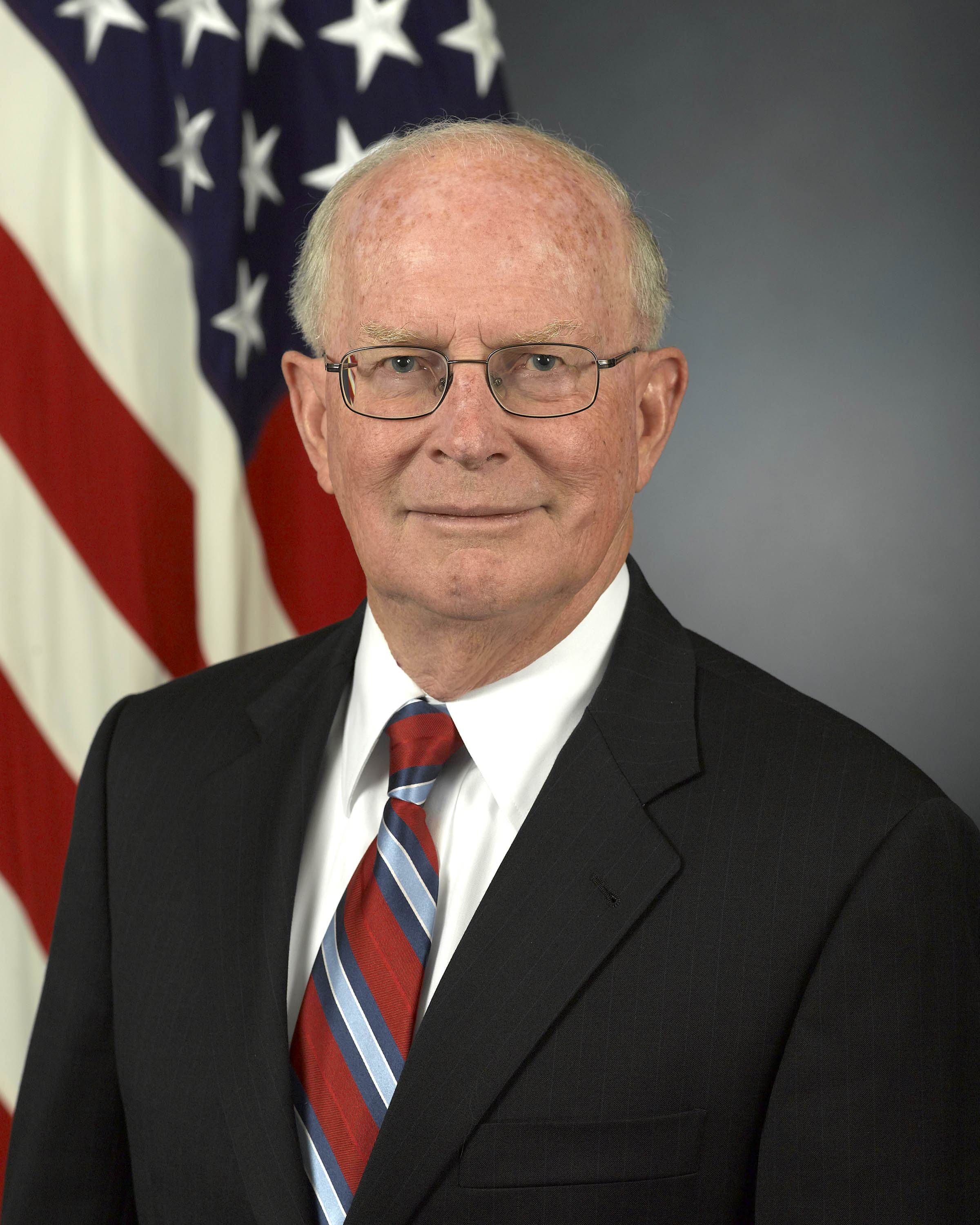
- Official portrait, 2012

1st Assistant Secretary of Defense for Readiness and Force Management
- In office March 26, 2012 – June 14, 2014; Acting: March 26, 2012 – April 18, 2013
- President: Barack Obama
- Preceded by: Position established
- Succeeded by: Veronica Daigle (2019)

Personal details
- Born: Frederick Emil Vollrath; July 16, 1940 Miami Beach, Florida, U.S.
- Died: January 1, 2017 (aged 76)
- Spouse: Joy Pollock (m. 1962)
- Education: University of Miami; Central Michigan University

Military service
- Allegiance: United States
- Branch/service: United States Army
- Years of service: 1962–1998
- Rank: Lieutenant General
- Commands: Deputy Chief of Staff for Personnel (G-1)
- Battles/wars: Vietnam War
- Awards: Army Distinguished Service Medal; Legion of Merit (2); Bronze Star Medal

Frederick Emil Vollrath (July 16, 1940 – January 1, 2017) was a United States Army lieutenant general who served as Deputy Chief of Staff G-1 Personnel of The United States Army from 1996 to 1998. From 2012 to 2014, he served as Assistant Secretary of Defense for Readiness and Force Management. Vollrath died in 2017.

== Education ==
Vollrath received a bachelor's degree in management from the University of Miami in 1962. He later earned a master's degree in personnel management from Central Michigan University.
