= Pennsylvania Department of Military and Veterans Affairs =

Agency overview
- Formed: April 11, 1793; 233 years ago
- Jurisdiction: Commonwealth of Pennsylvania
- Headquarters: Fort Indiantown Gap, Lebanon County, Pennsylvania
- Employees: 21,400 Total: 2,400 Commonwealth; 19,000 Military
- Agency executive: Major General Mark J. Schindler, Adjutant General
- Website: www.dmva.pa.gov

The Pennsylvania Department of Military and Veterans Affairs (DMVA) was established on April 11, 1793, by the Pennsylvania General Assembly. It is overseen by the adjutant general, a cabinet-level position appointed by the governor.

The Pennsylvania Department of Military and Veterans Affairs operates its own sworn Police Force at Fort Indiantown Gap. The Fort Indiantown Gap Installation Police enforce Pennsylvania State law and military regulations on State owned/operated property. They are required to be trained in accordance with Act 120 which is administered by the Pennsylvania Municipal Police Officers Education & Training Commission.

The Pennsylvania National Guard is a component of the Pennsylvania Department of Military and Veterans Affairs. The agency employs more than 2,400 commonwealth employees and approximately 19,000 Pennsylvania National Guard members in more than 90 communities across the commonwealth, ranking it as one of the state's top 10 largest employers.

In November 2015, Pennsylvania Department of Military and Veterans Affairs unveiled an online application that allows people to donate directly to its veterans programs, including the Veterans' Trust Fund and Military Family Relief Assistance Program.

== See also ==
- List of Pennsylvania state agencies
- Pennsylvania State Guard
