= Carlisle Runge =

American professor

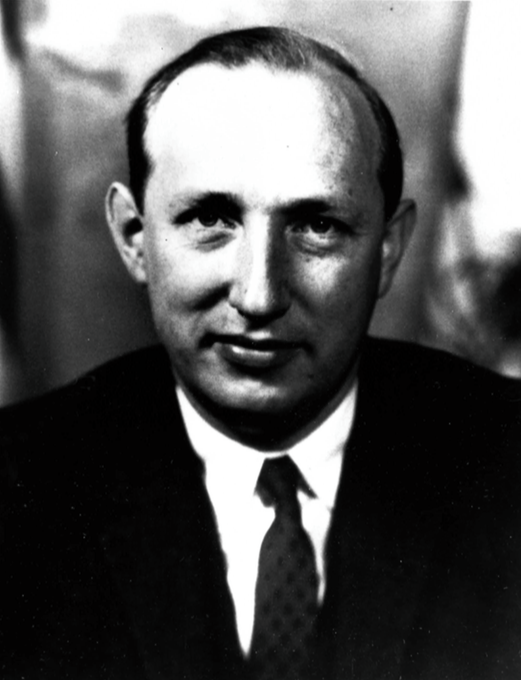

Assistant Secretary of Defense for Manpower
- In office February 17, 1961 – July 30, 1962
- President: John F. Kennedy
- Preceded by: Charles C. Finucane
- Succeeded by: Norman S. Paul

Personal details
- Born: March 23, 1920 Seymour, Wisconsin
- Died: September 18, 1983 (aged 63) Portage, Wisconsin
- Party: Democratic

Military service
- Allegiance: United States
- Branch/service: United States Army
- Years of service: 1942–1946
- Rank: Major

Carlisle Piehl Runge (March 23, 1920 – September 18, 1983) was a Wisconsin professor and department head, author, environmentalist, and politician who served as Assistant U.S. Secretary of Defense, Assistant U.S. Attorney for the Western District of Wisconsin, and Director of the United Nations Adriatic Environmental Study in Yugoslavia.

== Early life and education ==
Born in 1920 in Seymour, Wisconsin, in Outagamie County, Runge attended the University of Wisconsin–Madison and was on the debate team and majored in American Institutions. He was also President of the Student Board. Runge served as a logistics officer in the Quartermaster Corps of the Third U.S. Army under General George S. Patton during World War II, from 1942 until 1946, where he achieved the rank of Major and was awarded the Bronze Star. In addition he received four Battle Stars for engagements in the European theater. He landed at Omaha Beach with the Third Army and ended the war in Berlin where he was affiliated with the O.S.S. Runge also attended Oxford University for a year at the end of the war.

Upon his return to civilian life in the United States, he attended the University of Wisconsin Law School where he graduated in 1948. During his time at UW Madison, Runge belonged to Sigma Phi in Harold Bradley House.

== Career ==
Upon his admission to the bar in 1948, Runge started his career of public service as Assistant U.S. Attorney for the Western District of Wisconsin. In 1951, he joined the faculty of the University of Wisconsin Law School as Assistant Dean, and in less than seven years he attained the rank of a full professor. Runge later became the National Director of the Carnegie Foundation's Security Task Force. During his time as a professor, Runge continued to serve in the Wisconsin Army National Guard and attained the rank of colonel and Logistics Officer for the division.

Runge served as an active member of the Democratic Party of Wisconsin. Runge is perhaps best known in Wisconsin politics for his role as the Chairman of the highly publicized 1952 "Wisconsin Citizen's Committee on the Record of Joseph McCarthy," a group that made the first definitive study of the unsubstantiated nature of the Senator's charges and sold 100,000 copies of their findings. The committee's findings were run in three state newspapers.

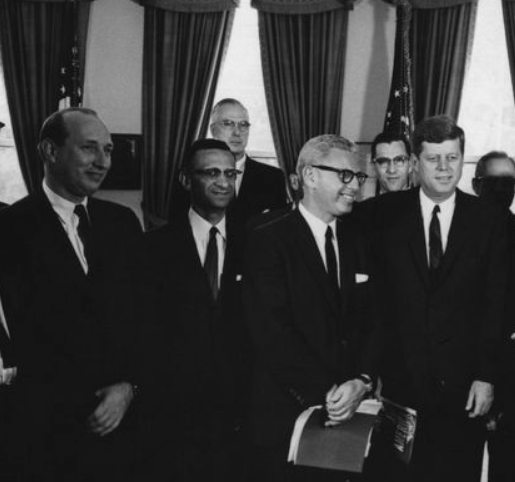
(Left to right) Carlisle P. Runge, Samuel Silver; Secretary of Labor Arthur Goldberg, President John F. Kennedy

=== Kennedy Administration (1961–62) ===
In 1961, Runge was appointed by President of the United States John F. Kennedy to be Assistant Secretary of Defense for Manpower, Personnel and Reserve. In this position, Runge served as one of the leaders of the President's Missile Sites Labor Commission, played an instrumental role in the study and deployment of reserve troops, and advocated against racial discrimination against African Americans in the military.

Runge was supportive of efforts of the American Veterans Committee to ensure adequate veterans' pensions and worked with the NAACP to eliminate segregationist practices in the military and its reserve components. In 1962, Runge was a supporter and contributor to the Presidential Commission on the Status of Women. Runge later recorded an Oral History with the John F. Kennedy Presidential Library and Museum where he described the 1960 Democratic National Convention and Democratic primary in Wisconsin, the internal operations of the Defense Department under Robert McNamara, and relations between the military branches and the Defense Department.

=== Return to University of Wisconsin ===
After leaving the Kennedy Administration, Runge returned to the University of Wisconsin System, where he acted as Special Assistant to President Ed Young. Runge served as the first Director of the Coordinating Committee on Higher Education, was a consultant to the Argonne Universities Association, served as the Chairman of the Department of Urban and Regional Planning, and founded UW-Madison's Department of Public Policy and Administration (now known as the Robert M. La Follette School of Public Affairs). He was also active in the creation of the Institute for Environmental Studies (now the Gaylord Nelson Institute of Environmental Studies). In 1973, Runge was appointed to be the Director of the United Nations Adriatic Environmental Study in Yugoslavia by Paul G. Hoffman, Administrator of the United Nations Development Programme.

=== Publications ===
Runge published numerous works including "Analysis of Water-Related Research Requirements in the Great Lakes Region", "New Directions in Regionalism: A Case Study of Intergovernmental Relations in Northwestern Wisconsin", and "An Analysis of the International Great Lakes Levels Board Report on Regulation of Great Lakes Water Levels".

== Retirement and later involvement ==
In 1981, Runge retired from the university and moved to his summer home in Brule, Wisconsin. He later became active in the affairs of Northland College and the Sigurd Olson Environmental Institute, and was the leading advocate of the bill that banned tubing on the Brule River. Upon his retirement, he received a convocation from the university entitled "The Wisconsin Idea-A Tribute to Carlisle P. Runge" sponsored by the UW Center for the Study of Public Policy and Administration, the Department of Urban and Regional Planning, and the Institute for Environmental Studies. Governor of Wisconsin Lee S. Dreyfus declared a "Carlisle Runge Day" in his honor. Runge was posthumously awarded with the Distinguished Service Award from the University of Wisconsin Law Alumni Association. Eulogies for Runge were delivered by U.S. senator Gaylord Nelson and Nathan Heffernan, Chief justice of the Wisconsin Supreme Court.

== Death and Surviving Family ==
Runge died on September 18, 1983, at the age of 63. He is buried at Pine Ridge Cemetery in Brule, Douglas County, Wisconsin. His first wife, Elizabeth Eshleman Runge, died of complications of multiple sclerosis in 1964. In 1966 he married Eleanor Vilas Runge. He had three children with his first wife, Carlisle Ford Runge, Elizabeth Louise Runge, and Frederica W Runge. His second wife had two children, Michael Bardeen Van Sicklen and Katherine Van Sicklen.
