= Todd A. Weiler =

American public servant, business executive and military veteran

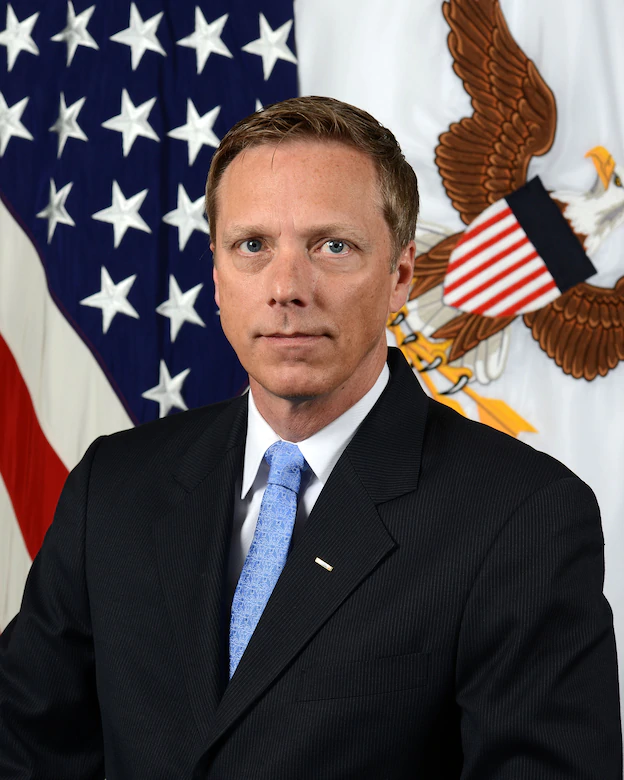
- Education: Texas Christian University
- Occupations: Businessperson and public servant
- Title: former Assistant Secretary of Defense (Manpower and Reserve Affairs)
- Website: Official website

Todd A. Weiler is an American public servant, business executive and military veteran. He has also served as the Deputy Assistant Secretary of the Army for Manpower and Reserve Affairs under President Bill Clinton and as the Assistant Secretary of Defense (Manpower and Reserve Affairs) under President Barack Obama.

== Military service ==
After graduating with a degree in political science from Texas Christian University in 1987, Weiler graduated from the US Army Aviation Center at Fort Rucker. He is a veteran of both Operation Desert Shield and Operation Desert Storm, serving as an Army attack helicopter pilot.

== Private industry ==
Todd Weiler served as the Vice President & CIO of Communities In Schools from 1999 to 2001. From 2001 to 2008, Weiler then served as the Co-Owner and Chief Operating Officer of Arrowpoint Corporation. Additionally, in 2008 he became the CEO and founder of One Hemisphere Ventures.

== Public service ==
Weiler was a part of President Bill Clinton's Inaugural Committee and was an advanceman for future First Lady Hillary Clinton during the 1992 Presidential campaign, having previously served in the same role for presidential candidate Walter Mondale and former presidential primary candidate Paul Tsongas. After Clinton was elected, he was appointed the White House's liaison to the Department of Defense.

Weiler then served as the Deputy Assistant Secretary of the Army for Manpower and Reserve Affairs between 1993 and 1998 under President Clinton. During his tenure he was the co-chair of tuition assistance task force for US Army soldiers. Weiler was later appointed as the Assistant Secretary of Defense (Manpower and Reserve Affairs) by President Barack Obama in 2016 and served until the end of Obama's term in office. Weiler is also an advocate for LGBTQ individuals serving in the military.
