= Deaths in October 2007 =

The following is a list of notable deaths in October 2007.

Entries for each day are listed alphabetically by surname. A typical entry lists information in the following sequence:

- Name, age, country of citizenship at birth, subsequent country of citizenship (if applicable), reason for notability, cause of death (if known), and reference.

== October 2007 ==
=== 1 ===
- Bernard Delaire, 108, French Naval veteran of World War I, one of the last six identified.
- Bruce Hay, 57, British rugby player for Britain and Scotland, brain tumour.
- Ronnie Hazlehurst, 79, British theme song composer (Are You Being Served?) and jazz musician, stroke.
- Israel Kugler, 90, American labor leader and professor, pneumonia.
- Harry Lee, 75, American politician, Sheriff of Jefferson Parish, Louisiana, leukemia.
- Chris Mainwaring, 41, Australian footballer (West Coast Eagles), television and radio sports journalist.
- Peggy Maley, 84, American actress.
- James A. Martin, 105, American Roman Catholic Jesuit priest, world's oldest Jesuit, pneumonia.
- Al Oerter, 71, American athlete and Olympic gold medallist in discus (1956, 1960, 1964 and 1968), heart failure.
- Tetsuo Okamoto, 75, Brazilian swimmer and Brazil's first Olympic swimming medallist (1952), respiratory failure.
- Pedro Saúl Pérez, 54, Dominican advocate for the rights of Dominican immigrants in Puerto Rico, heart attack.
- Ned Sherrin, 76, British broadcaster and theatre producer, throat cancer.
- Ralph W. Sturges, 88, American Mohegan tribal chief.
- Henry Wells, 92, American expert on Latin American politics, professor and author, complications from Alzheimer's disease.

=== 2 ===
- Frederick Bayer, 85, American emeritus curator at the Smithsonian Institution's National Museum of Natural History, heart failure.
- Tex Coulter, 82, American National and Canadian Football League player (New York Giants).
- Gianni Danzi, 67, Italian Archbishop of the Territorial Prelature of Loreto.
- Elfi von Dassanowsky, 83, Austrian opera singer, actress and film producer.
- Christopher Derrick, 86, British writer.
- Šime Đodan, 79, Croatian parliamentarian, defence minister (1991).
- Dave Fegidero, 29, Filipino footballer.
- Gary Franklin, 79, American film critic, KABC-TV (Los Angeles).
- Richard Goldwater, 71, American president of Archie Comics, creator of Josie and the Pussycats, cancer.
- George Grizzard, 79, American actor, lung cancer.
- Princess Katherine of Greece and Denmark, 94, Greek former Princess of Greece, last surviving great-granddaughter of Queen Victoria.
- Dan Keating, 105, Irish republican activist, last surviving veteran of the Irish War of Independence.
- J. Edward Lundy, 92, American automobile executive (Ford Motor Co.).
- Tawn Mastrey, 53, American radio disc jockey (KNAC), hepatitis C.
- James Michaels, 86, American editor of Forbes (1961–1999), pneumonia.
- José Antonio Ríos Granados, 48, Mexican politician, mayor of Tultitlán (2000–2003), air crash.
- Willi Rössler, 83, German Olympic fencer.
- Alec Spalding, 84, British scout leader.

=== 3 ===
- John Buxton, 73, New Zealand rugby union player.
- Violet Kazue de Cristoforo, 90, American poet, held in Japanese-American internment camps during WWII, stroke.
- Kenneth R. Harding, 93, American Sergeant at Arms of the United States House of Representatives (1972–1980), pneumonia.
- Wyn Harness, 47, British journalist.
- Herbert Muschamp, 59, American architecture critic for The New York Times, lung cancer.
- Pablo Palazuelo, 90, Spanish artist.
- Tony Ryan, 71, Irish entrepreneur and joint founder of Ryanair, after long illness.
- Rogelio Salmona, 78, Colombian architect, Alvar Aalto Medal and Prince Claus Award winner, cancer.
- Sir Richard Trant, 79, British Army general.
- Giuseppe Valdengo, 93, Italian operatic baritone.
- M. N. Vijayan, 77, Indian academic, writer and journalist, heart attack.

=== 4 ===
- Bob Burdick, 70, American NASCAR driver.
- Chen Chi-li, 64, Chinese-born Taiwanese gangster, killer of dissident journalist Henry Liu, pancreatic cancer.
- Antonie Iorgovan, 59, Romanian politician, main author of the Constitution of Romania, heart attack.
- Kim Min-woo, 21, South Korean ice dancer, traffic collision.
- Don Nottebart, 71, American Major League Baseball player, stroke.

=== 5 ===
- John Atchison, 53, American federal prosecutor and alleged child sex offender, suicide by hanging.
- Alexandra Boulat, 45, French photojournalist, aneurysm.
- Walter Kempowski, 78, German author and archivist, intestinal cancer.
- Kim Kyu-hwan, 86, South Korean footballer and Olympian (1948).
- Władysław Kopaliński, 99, Polish lexicographer.
- Vladimir Kuzin, 77, Russian cross-country skier and Olympian (1956), long illness.
- Steven Massarsky, 59, American attorney and businessman, complications related to cancer.
- Edwyn Owen, 71, American ice hockey player, gold medalist at the 1960 Winter Olympics, car fire.
- Matilde Salvador i Segarra, 89, Spanish composer, stroke.
- Justin Tuveri, 109, Italian-French World War I veteran.
- Laura Ulewicz, 77, American poet.

=== 6 ===
- Babasaheb Bhosale, 86, Indian politician, Chief Minister of Maharashtra (1982–1983).
- Robert W. Bussard, 79, American physicist, researcher of nuclear fusion, cancer.
- Jo Ann Davis, 57, American member of the US House of Representatives from Virginia since 2001, breast cancer.
- Nancy DeShone, 75, American baseball player (AAGPBL)
- Rodney Diak, 83, British stage and film actor, cancer.
- Phil Dodds, 56, American audio engineer, cancer.
- Bud Ekins, 77, American motorcycle racer and stunt performer (The Great Escape), natural causes.
- Terence Wilmot Hutchison, 95, British economist.
- Slavko Janjušević, 66, Croatian Olympic rower (1964).
- Tom Murphy, 39, Irish Tony Award-winning actor of stage and screen (The Beauty Queen of Leenane), lymphatic cancer.
- Laza Ristovski, 51, Serbian keyboardist (Smak, Bijelo dugme), multiple sclerosis.
- George F. Senner Jr., 85, American member of the US House of Representatives from Arizona (1963–1967).

=== 7 ===
- Norifumi Abe, 32, Japanese MotoGP racer, traffic accident.
- Stéphane Maurice Bongho-Nouarra, 70, Congolese Prime Minister (1992).
- Sir Alan Campbell, 88, British diplomat.
- Sisi Chen, 68, Chinese actress, pancreatic cancer.
- Paul Cullen, 98, Australian army general.
- Luciana Frassati Gawronska, 105, Polish-Italian writer and anti-Nazi activist, mother of Jas Gawronski.
- Herb Parker, 86, American educator and football coach.
- George E. Sangmeister, 76, American member of the US House of Representatives from Illinois (1989–1995), leukemia.
- Jiřina Steimarová, 91, Czech actress.
- Lilis Suryani, 59, Indonesian singer, uterine cancer.
- Joe Waggonner, 89, American member of the US House of Representatives from Louisiana (1961–1979).

=== 8 ===
- Constantine Andreou, 90, Brazilian-born Greek-French painter and sculptor.
- Milan Đukić, 61, Serbian-Croatian politician, leader of the Serb People's Party.
- John Henry, 32, American Hall of Fame thoroughbred racehorse, euthanized after kidney failure.
- Nicky James, 64, British pop singer (The Moody Blues), brain tumour.
- Zdzisław Peszkowski, 89, Polish Roman Catholic priest, advocate for the families of Katyn victims.
- Salem Sabah Al-Salem Al-Sabah, 69, Kuwaiti politician, member of the ruling family, after long illness.
- Francis Schewetta, 88, French Olympic silver medal-winning (1948) athlete.
- Jean-François Van Der Motte, 93, Belgian Olympic cyclist.
- Chick Zamick, 81, Canadian ice hockey player.

=== 9 ===
- Enrico Banducci, 85, American nightclub impresario (North Beach, San Francisco).
- Carol Bruce, 87, American actress (WKRP in Cincinnati, Planes, Trains & Automobiles, American Gigolo), chronic obstructive pulmonary disease.
- Henk van Brussel, 72, Dutch footballer and football manager, heart attack.
- Fausto Correia, 55, Portuguese politician, heart attack.
- Belinda Dann, 107, Australian centenarian, longest-lived member of the Stolen Generation.
- Mary Louise Kolanko, 75, American baseball player (All-American Girls Professional Baseball League).
- Robert McGehee, 64, American Chairman and Chief Executive Officer of Progress Energy Inc, stroke.
- Dudley Ryder, 7th Earl of Harrowby, 84, British aristocrat and banker.
- Kurt Schwaen, 98, German composer, natural causes.
- Bram Zeegers, 58, Dutch lawyer and key witness in the trial of Willem Holleeder.

=== 10 ===
- S. R. Bommai, 83, Indian politician.
- Ambrose De Paoli, 73, American-born Roman Catholic Archbishop, nuncio to Australia, leukemia.
- Ken Fry, 86, Australian politician, MP for Fraser (1974–1984).
- Francis García, 49, Mexican transvestite actress and designer, pulmonary thrombosis.
- Len Keogh, 76, Australian politician, MP for Bowman (1969–1975, 1983–1987).
- Norman Mashabane, 51, South African politician, former ambassador to Indonesia, car accident.
- Mehmed Uzun, 54, Turkish novelist, stomach cancer.

=== 11 ===
- Sri Chinmoy, 76, Indian-born philosopher and guru, heart attack.
- Ignatius D'Cunha, 83, Indian Bishop Emeritus of Aurangabad.
- John H. Edwards, 79, British geneticist.
- Tex Hill, 92, American fighter pilot and flying ace, member of the Flying Tigers.
- Juca, 78, Portuguese footballer and coach (Sporting, national team).
- Rauni Mollberg, 78, Finnish film director, leukemia.
- Pat "Gravy" Patterson, 73, American baseball and football coach at Louisiana Tech, suicide by gunshot.
- Roy Rosenzweig, 57, American historian, lung cancer.
- Carlos Salgado, 67, Honduran journalist and comedian, shot.
- David Salmon, 95, American Athabascan tribal chief, cancer.
- Werner von Trapp, 91, Austrian-born musician and singer, member of the Trapp Family Singers who inspired The Sound of Music.

=== 12 ===
- Paulo Autran, 85, Brazilian actor, lung cancer.
- Kim Beazley Sr., 90, Australian politician, former government minister.
- Lonny Chapman, 87, American actor (The Birds, Norma Rae, The Hunted), heart disease.
- Noel Coleman, 87, British actor.
- Bud Harless, 83, American racing driver.
- Ruby Hooper, 83, American first female major party candidate to run for Governor of North Carolina, 1993 North Carolina Mother of the Year.
- Kisho Kurokawa, 73, Japanese architect, heart failure.
- Judy Mazel, 63, American cookbook author (The Beverly Hills Diet), complications from peripheral vascular disease.
- Ranjit Singh Sarkaria, 91, Indian Supreme Court judge (1973–1981), head of the Sarkaria Commission.
- Soe Win, 59, Burmese Prime Minister (2004–2007), leukemia.

=== 13 ===
- Vernon Bellecourt, 75, Native American activist, pneumonia.
- Andrée de Jongh, 90, Belgian Resistance member, organized the Comet Line POW escape network.
- Bob Denard, 78, French mercenary.
- Art Harris, 60, American basketball player (Stanford Cardinal, Seattle SuperSonics, Phoenix Suns).
- Obaidul Huq, 95, Bangladeshi journalist and filmmaker.
- Alec Kessler, 40, American basketball player (Georgia Bulldogs, Miami Heat), heart attack.
- Kribensis, 23, Irish racehorse.
- Marion Michael, 66, German actress and singer, heart failure.
- James L. Oakes, 83, American federal judge.
- Jim Poston, 63, British diplomat, Governor of the Turks & Caicos Islands (2002–2005).

=== 14 ===
- Salih Saif Aldin, 32, Iraqi correspondent for The Washington Post, shot.
- Big Moe, 33, American rapper, heart attack.
- Fred Bruckbauer, 69, American baseball player (Minnesota Twins).
- Judy Crichton, 77, American television producer, leukemia.
- Owen Friend, 80, American baseball player.
- George Neil Jenkins, 92, British scientist.
- Philippe Malaud, 82, French diplomat and politician.
- André Maréchal, 90, French optics researcher.
- Raymond Pellegrin, 82, French actor.
- Frances Rich, 97, American actress and sculptor, heart attack.
- Shin Hyun-joon, 91, South Korean general.
- Slew o' Gold, 27, American thoroughbred racehorse and Hall of Fame inductee, euthanized.
- Pentti Snellman, 81, Finnish Olympic athlete.
- Sigrid Valdis, 72, American actress (Hogan's Heroes), lung cancer.

=== 15 ===
- Yevhen Buslovych, 35, Ukrainian wrestler and Olympian (2000).
- Jackie Little, 95, British footballer (Ipswich Town).
- Bobby Mauch, 86, American child actor and film editor.
- Bernard Scudder, 53, British poet and translator of Icelandic literature.
- Robert Shields, 89, American Protestant minister and diarist.
- Vito Taccone, 67, Italian cyclist, heart attack.
- Lucius Theus, 85, American US Air Force major-general, Tuskegee Airman.
- Ernest Withers, 85, American photographer, stroke.

=== 16 ===
- Rosalio José Castillo Lara, 85, Venezuelan Roman Catholic cardinal.
- M. A. Hadi, 68, Bangladeshi academic, Vice Chancellor of Bangabandhu Sheikh Mujib Medical University, brain haemorrhage.
- Ignacy Jeż, 93, Polish Roman Catholic bishop.
- Deborah Kerr, 86, British actress (From Here to Eternity, Black Narcissus, The King and I), complications of Parkinson's disease.
- Arbab Jehangir Khan, 72, Pakistani politician, former NWFP Chief Minister, cardiac arrest.
- Jerzy Markuszewski, 76, Polish theatre director and dissident.
- Ragnar Pedersen, 65, Norwegian illustrator.
- Toše Proeski, 26, Macedonian singer, car accident.
- Steve J. Spears, 56, Australian author, playwright and television writer, cancer.
- Barbara West, 96, British Titanic survivor.

=== 17 ===
- Sumie Awara, 55, Japanese long jumper and Olympian (1976).
- Billy Berroa, 79, Dominican Spanish broadcaster for New York Mets on WADO, prostate cancer.
- Joey Bishop, 89, American entertainer, last surviving member of the Rat Pack.
- Teresa Brewer, 76, American pop and jazz singer, supranuclear palsy.
- Sammy Duddy, 62, British political activist, member of the Northern Irish loyalist UPRG, heart attack.
- Germán Espinosa, 69, Colombian writer, cancer.
- Maria Kwaśniewska, 94, Polish javelin thrower and Olympian (1936).
- Peter Oliver, Baron Oliver of Aylmerton, 86, British law lord (1986–1992).
- Aminu Safana, 46, Nigerian MP, heart attack.
- Taku, 14, American orca at SeaWorld San Antonio.
- Rüdiger von Wechmar, 83, German diplomat and politician.
- Robert A. Young, 83, American member of the US House of Representatives from Missouri (1977–1987), liver disease.

=== 18 ===
- Alan Coren, 69, British writer and satirist, editor of Punch (1978–1987), cancer.
- William J. Crowe, 82, American Ambassador to UK (1994–1997), Chairman of the Joint Chiefs of Staff (1985–1989), cardiac arrest.
- Vincent DeDomenico, 92, American inventor of Rice-A-Roni.
- Lucky Dube, 43, South African reggae musician, shot during carjacking.
- Abdul Khaliq, Pakistani footballer, suicide bombing.
- Michiko Kihara, 59, Japanese swimmer and Olympian (1964).
- Anthony R. Michaelis, 91, German science journalist.
- Nino Rešić, 43, Bosnian singer.
- Joe Sellwood, 96, Australian who was oldest living AFL/VFL footballer.
- Mark Tavener, 53, British novelist and comedy writer, cancer.

=== 19 ===
- Mariann Ambrus, 51, Hungarian rower and Olympian (1976, 1980).
- Anton Bodem, 82, German Catholic theologian.
- Yolanda Brown, 21, American R&B singer, killed.
- Randall Forsberg, 64, American nuclear arms control advocate, cancer.
- Michael Maidens, 20, British footballer for Hartlepool United, car accident.
- Jan Wolkers, 81, Dutch writer and artist.

=== 20 ===
- Peg Bracken, 89, American cookbook writer.
- Ivo Cappo, 55, Papua New Guinean magistrate, stoning.
- Max McGee, 75, American professional football player (Green Bay Packers), fall from roof.
- Jim Mitchell, 60, American professional football player (Atlanta Falcons), heart attack.
- Helend Peep, 97, Estonian actor.
- Josep Pintat-Solans, 82, Andorran politician and businessman, Mayor of Sant Julià de Lòria (1960-1963) and Prime Minister (1984-1990).
- Paul Raven, 46, British rock bassist (Ministry, Killing Joke), heart attack.
- Stine Rossel, 32, Danish archaeologist, hiking accident.
- Yemi Tella, 56, Nigerian coach of the World Cup–winning under-17 football team, cancer.

=== 21 ===
- Surinder Singh Bajwa, 52, Indian politician, Deputy Mayor of Delhi, fall after rhesus macaque attack.
- Margit Csillik, 92, Hungarian Olympic gymnast (1936).
- Ernst Ehrlich, 86, Swiss Jewish philosopher.
- Don Fellows, 84, American actor.
- Paul Fox, 56, British guitarist (The Ruts), lung cancer.
- Peter Howard, 81, British Air Vice Marshal, Royal Air Force.
- Siddiq Khan, 60, Pakistani cricket umpire.
- R. B. Kitaj, 74, American-born British-based pop artist.
- Peter Moffatt, 84, British television director (All Creatures Great and Small, Doctor Who).
- Ileana Sonnabend, 92, Romanian-born American founder of Sonnabend Gallery.
- Lloyd Wendt, 99, American newspaper editor and publisher.

=== 22 ===
- Sargon Boulus, 63, Iraqi poet.
- Ève Curie, 102, French author, daughter of Pierre and Marie Curie.
- Billy Ray Hamilton, 57, American death row inmate, natural causes.
- Brendan McWilliams, 63, Irish meteorologist and writer.
- Soedarpo Sastrosatomo, 87, Indonesian businessman.

=== 23 ===
- Boris Gulyayev, 66, Soviet Russian speed skater and Olympian (1964).
- John Ilhan, 42, Australian founder of Crazy John's mobile phone retail chain, suspected heart attack.
- David Kendall, 89, British mathematician.
- Lim Goh Tong, 90, Malaysian Chinese billionaire, founder of the Genting Group.
- Ursula Vaughan Williams, 96, British author and poet, wife of Ralph Vaughan Williams.

=== 24 ===
- David Adams, 78, Canadian ballet dancer, after long illness.
- Petr Eben, 78, Czech composer.
- Peter Harding, 82, British rock climber.
- Alisher Saipov, 26, Kyrgyz journalist, shot.
- Masakazu Yoshizawa, 57, Japanese-born American flutist (Memoirs of a Geisha, Jurassic Park), stomach cancer.

=== 25 ===
- Michael England, 89, English cricketer.
- Carole Hillard, 71, American politician, Lieutenant Governor of South Dakota (1995–2003), pneumonia.
- Puntsagiin Jasrai, 73, Mongolian Prime Minister (1992–1996).
- Bo Karenus, 70, Swedish Olympic speed skater (1960).
- Matthew Locke, 33, Australian soldier.
- Sir Richard Rougier, 75, British judge, lung cancer.
- Harvey Shapiro, 97, American cellist.

=== 26 ===
- Jacinta Balbela, 88, Uruguayan judge and jurist, member of the Supreme Court of Justice (1985–1989).
- Jim Cummins, 62, American correspondent for NBC News, cancer.
- Nicolae Dobrin, 60, Romanian footballer, lung cancer.
- Friedman Paul Erhardt, 63, German-born pioneering television chef, "Chef Tell," inspiration for the Swedish Chef, heart failure.
- Aleksandr Feklisov, 93, Russian KGB spymaster.
- John L. Gaunt, 83, American Pulitzer Prize-winning photographer, congestive heart failure.
- Arthur Kornberg, 89, American recipient of the 1959 Nobel Prize in Physiology or Medicine, respiratory failure.
- Lisa Richette, 79, American lawyer, judge of the Philadelphia County Court of Common Pleas, lung cancer.
- Khun Sa, 73, Burmese warlord.
- Hans Stern, 85, Brazilian jeweler, founder of the company H.Stern.

=== 27 ===
- Charles Batt, 78, Australian politician.
- Víctor Bignon, 82, Chilean boxer and Olympian (1948).
- Sydney Foster, 86, Jamaican Olympic hurdler (1948).
- George Washington, 4, Irish race horse, euthanized.
- Hector Gosset, 81, Belgian Olympic sprinter (1948).
- Satyen Kappu, 76, Indian Bollywood character actor, cardiac arrest.
- Moira Lister, 84, South African-born British-based actress.
- Leslie Orgel, 80, British chemist.
- Othman Saat, 80, Malaysian politician, former Chief Minister of Johor state.
- Henk Vredeling, 82, Dutch politician, minister and European Commissioner.

=== 28 ===
- Bao Zunxin, 70, Chinese intellectual and jailed Tiananmen Square democracy activist, brain hemorrhage.
- Graham Chadwick, 84, British bishop and anti-apartheid campaigner.
- Arnold Wilson Cowen, 101, American judge.
- Takao Fujinami, 74, Japanese politician convicted of accepting bribes.
- Evelyn Hamann, 65, German actress.
- Jimmy Makulis, 72, Greek singer.
- Guido Nicheli, 73, Italian actor, stroke.
- Stuart Sidey, 99, New Zealand politician, Mayor of Dunedin (1959–1965).
- Josef Stawinoga, 87, Polish hermit, lived nearly 40 years in tent next to Wolverhampton Ring Road.
- Porter Wagoner, 80, American country music singer, lung cancer.
- William George Wilson, 90, American cinematographer.

=== 29 ===
- Eloise Baza, 54, Guamanian president of the Guam Chamber of Commerce (1984–2007).
- Jan Borkus, 87, Dutch radio actor.
- Anthony Clare, 64, Irish psychiatrist and broadcaster.
- Sam Dana, 104, American football player, complications of infection.
- Kenneth Franzheim II, 82, American oilman and philanthropist.
- Milan Jeger, 76, Yugoslav Olympic swimmer (1960).
- Jim Jennings, 73, American football player (Missouri Tigers, Green Bay Packers).
- Dan Lakly, 65, American politician, member of the Georgia House of Representatives, heart attack.
- Jarmila Loukotková, 84, Czech author.
- Frane Matošić, 89, Croatian football player.
- Jesse J. McCrary Jr., 70, American politician, Secretary of State of Florida, (1978–1979), lung cancer.
- Thomas Meskill, 79, American politician and federal judge, Governor of Connecticut (1971–1975).
- David Morris, 83, British painter and actor.
- Christian d'Oriola, 79, French fencer.
- La Sa Ra, 91, Indian Tamil novelist.
- Savo Radusinović, 53, Serbian folk singer.
- Carrie Rozelle, 69, Canadian-born education activist, cancer.
- Senkichi Taniguchi, 95, Japanese film director, pneumonia.

=== 30 ===
- Grzegorz Ciastek, 52, Polish Olympic gymnast (1976).
- Robert Goulet, 73, American singer and actor (Camelot, Beetlejuice), idiopathic pulmonary fibrosis.
- Peter Hoagland, 66, American member of the U.S. House of Representatives from Nebraska (1989–1995), Parkinson's disease.
- Izzy Katzman, 90, American sportswriter.
- Norbert Lynton, 80, German-born British art historian.
- Srđan Mrkušić, 92, Serbian football goalkeeper.
- Yisrael Poliakov, 66, Israeli actor, member of comedy group HaGashash HaHiver, liver cancer.
- Dina Rabinovitch, 44, British journalist, breast cancer.
- Paul Roche, 91, British poet and translator.
- Linda S. Stein, 62, American former manager of the Ramones, real estate agent, beaten.
- Washoe, 42, American-trained African-born chimpanzee believed to be first non-human to acquire human language, influenza.
- John Woodruff, 92, American Olympic gold medalist in 800m (1936), atrial fibrillation and chronic renal failure.

=== 31 ===
- Alderbrook, 18, British racehorse, winner of the 1995 Champion Hurdle.
- John H. Baker Jr., 72, American football player and county sheriff.
- Sir Kenneth Bradshaw, 85, British constitutionalist, Clerk of the House of Commons (1983–1987).
- Ray Gravell, 56, British rugby union player for Wales.
- Erdal İnönü, 81, Turkish physicist and politician, Deputy Prime Minister (1991–1993), leukemia.
- Bradford Kelleher, 87, American former vice president of the Metropolitan Museum of Art, founder of the Met Store.
