= Organizational structure of the United States Department of Defense =

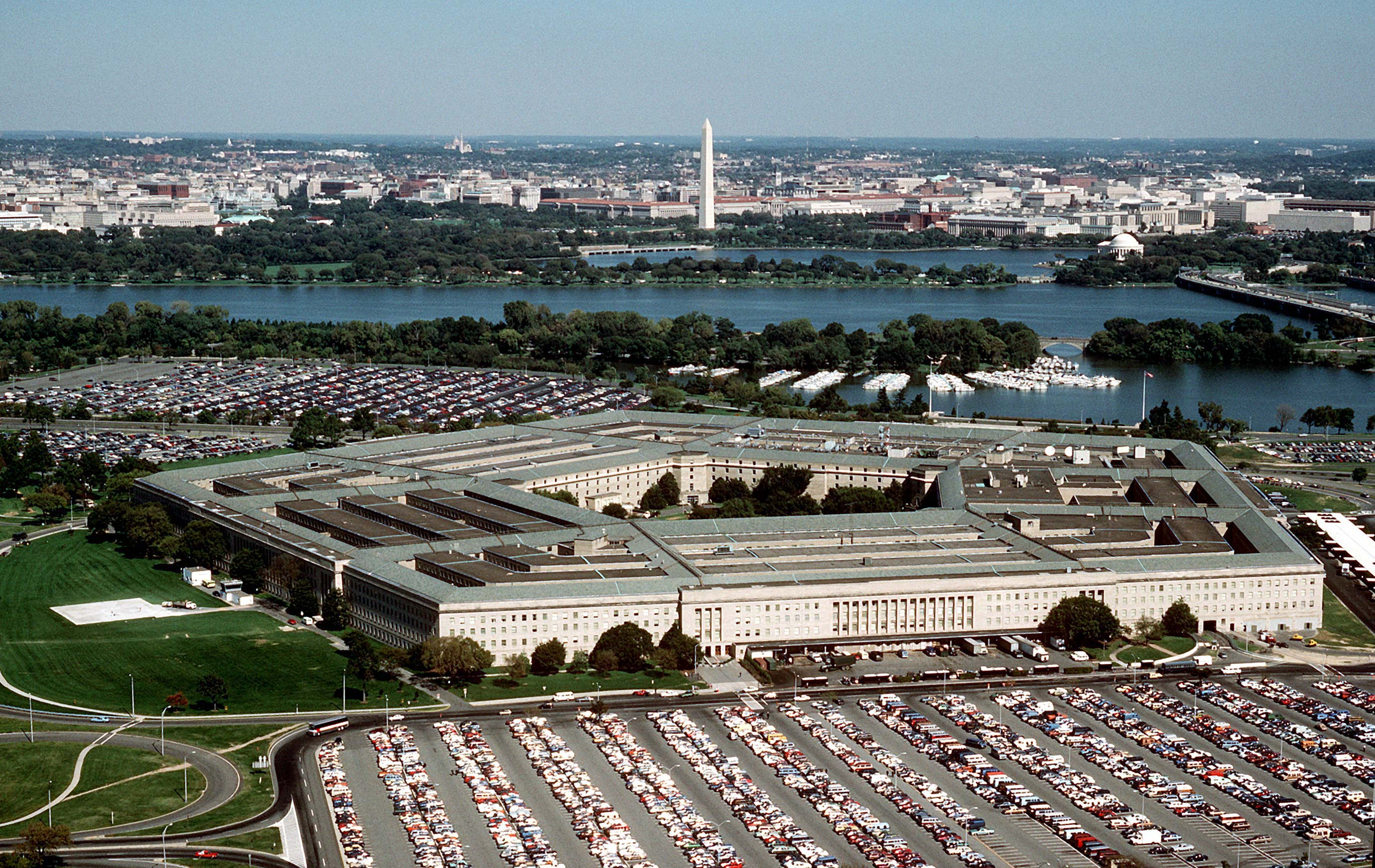
The Pentagon, headquarters of the United States Department of Defense

The United States Department of Defense (DoD) has a complex organizational structure. It includes the Army, Navy, the Marine Corps, Air Force, Space Force, the Unified combatant commands, U.S. elements of multinational commands (such as NATO and NORAD), as well as non-combat agencies such as the Defense Intelligence Agency and the National Security Agency. The DoD's annual budget was roughly US$496.1 billion in 2015. This figure is the base amount and does not include the $64.3 billion spent on "War/Non-War Supplementals". Including those items brings the total to $560.6 billion for 2015.

Civilian control over matters other than operations is exercised through the three service departments, the Department of the Army, the Department of the Navy (which includes the Marine Corps), and the Department of the Air Force (which includes the Space Force). Each is led by a military secretary, who is below Cabinet rank.

During peacetime the Department of Homeland Security has operational and administrative control over the Coast Guard. During a national emergency the President may give operational control to the Department of Defense and administrative control to the Department of the Navy, this can also be done when Congress declares war. Prior to the creation of DHS, the Coast Guard was under the control of the Department of Transportation, and earlier under the Department of the Treasury. According to the U.S. Code, the Coast Guard is at all times considered one of the six armed services of the United States. During times of declared war (or by Congressional direction), the Coast Guard operates as a part of the Navy; this has not happened since World War II, but members have served in undeclared wars and conflicts since then while the service remained in its peacetime department.

The Pentagon Reservation in Arlington County, Virginia, across the Potomac River from Washington, D.C., is the Department's headquarters. The Department is protected by the Pentagon Force Protection Agency, which ensures law enforcement and security for the Pentagon and various other jurisdictions throughout the National Capital Region (NCR).

== Chain of Command ==

The President of the United States is, according to the Constitution, the "Commander in Chief of the Army and Navy of the United States, and of the Militia of the several States, when called into the actual Service of the United States," now understood to also include the Air Force and other components of the DOD; and Chief Executive of the Federal Government. The Secretary of Defense is the "Principal Assistant to the President in all matters relating to the Department of Defense", and is vested with statutory authority (10 U.S.C. § 113) to lead the Department and all of its component agencies, including military command authority second only to the President.

The President and the Secretary of Defense exercise authority and control of the Armed Forces in two ways: operational, and administrative. Operational command (10 U.S.C. § 162) runs from the President, through the Secretary of Defense, to the Unified Combatant Commanders for missions and forces assigned to their commands. Administratively, authority runs from the President through the Secretary of Defense to the Secretaries of the Military Departments, i.e., the Secretary of the Army (10 U.S.C. § 7013), the Secretary of the Navy (10 U.S.C. § 8013), and the Secretary of the Air Force (10 U.S.C. § 9013). The Military Departments, organized separately within the Department, operate under the authority, direction, and control of the Secretary of that Military Department. The Secretaries of the Military Departments exercise authority through their respective Service Chiefs (i.e., Chief of Staff of the Army, Commandant of the Marine Corps, Chief of Naval Operations, Chief of Staff of the Air Force, and Chief of Space Operations) over forces not assigned to a Unified Combatant Command. Except as otherwise prescribed by law, the Service Chiefs perform their duties under the authority, direction, and control of the Secretaries of their respective Military Departments, to whom they are directly responsible.

In the Goldwater-Nichols Department of Defense Reorganization Act of 1986, Congress clarified the command line to the Unified Combatant Commanders and preserved civilian control of the military. The Act states that the operational chain of command runs from the President to the Secretary of Defense to the Unified Combatant Commanders. The Act permits the President to direct that communications pass through the Chairman of the Joint Chiefs of Staff from the Secretary of Defense and the Unified Combatant Commanders. This authority places the Chairman in the communications chain. Further, the Act gives the Secretary of Defense wide latitude to assign the Chairman oversight responsibilities for the Unified Combatant Commanders' activities.

=== Civilian control ===
Article II Section 2 of the Constitution designates the President as "Commander in Chief" of the Army, Navy and state militias. The President exercises this supreme command authority through the civilian Secretary of Defense, who by federal law is the head of the department, has authority direction, and control over the Department of Defense, and is the principal assistant to the President in all matters relating to the Department of Defense. The Secretary's principal deputy is the equally civilian Deputy Secretary of Defense who is delegated full powers to act for the Secretary of Defense. The Office of the Secretary of Defense (OSD) is the Secretary and Deputy Secretary's civilian staff, which includes several Under Secretaries and Assistant Secretaries of Defense with functional oversight responsibilities. The Secretaries of the Military Departments (i.e. Secretary of the Army, Secretary of the Navy, and Secretary of the Air Force) are subordinate to the Secretary of Defense. They have the authority under Title 10 of the United States Code to conduct all the affairs of their respective departments (Department of the Army, Department of the Navy, and Department of the Air Force) within which the military services are organized. Although subordinate to the Secretary of Defense, they are appointed by, and serve at the pleasure of, the President of the United States. As such, they cannot be removed from office by the Secretary of Defense, but can only be removed unilaterally by the President, or through impeachment by the Congress.

Historically, there have been challenges to civilian control. Most notably, during the Korean War, General Douglas MacArthur ignored civilian instructions regarding advancing troops toward the Yalu River, which triggered an introduction of massive forces from China. Also, on April 5, 1950, Representative Joseph William Martin Jr., the Minority Leader of the United States House of Representatives, released copies of a letter from MacArthur critical of President Harry S. Truman's limited-war strategy to the press and read it aloud on the floor of the house. President Truman relieved MacArthur of command, and MacArthur then explored political options against Truman. The Revolt of the Admirals is another example in the same era of a challenge to civilian control.

DoD policies and directives protect the policy of civilian control by establishing strict limitations on military members' political activities. For example, DoD Directive 1344.10 prohibits active-duty members of the military from running for office or making political appearances in uniform. However, enforcing this strict separation between the military and politics has been problematic. For example, over the years, many elected officials, including members of Congress, continued serving in the reserves while holding elected office. As another example, at a September 14, 2007, rally for Republican Presidential candidate John McCain in New Hampshire, seven on-duty uniformed Army personnel addressed the gathering. As another example, although DOD Directive 1344.10 prohibits political appearances by active-duty military members in uniform, Virginia Governor Bob McDonnell invited a uniformed Army Staff Sergeant to stand behind him during his televised Republican response to the 2010 State of the Union Address.

== Components of the Department of Defense ==
Program
Secretary of Defense Deputy Secretary of Defense	Defense Innovation Unit
Secretary of Defense Deputy Secretary of Defense	Assistant to the Secretary of Defense for Public Affairs; *Defense Media Activity
Secretary of Defense Deputy Secretary of Defense	Director of Administration and Management; *Pentagon Force Protection Agency; *Washington Headquarters Services
Secretary of Defense Deputy Secretary of Defense	Assistant Secretary of Defense for Legislative Affairs
Secretary of Defense Deputy Secretary of Defense	Director of Cost Assessment and Program Evaluation
Secretary of Defense Deputy Secretary of Defense	Office of Net Assessment
Secretary of Defense Deputy Secretary of Defense	General Counsel of Defense; *Defense Legal Services Agency
Secretary of Defense Deputy Secretary of Defense	Chief Digital and Artificial Intelligence Office
Secretary of Defense Deputy Secretary of Defense	Chief Information Officer *Defense Information Systems Agency
Secretary of Defense Deputy Secretary of Defense	Operational Test and Evaluation Directorate
Secretary of Defense Deputy Secretary of Defense	United States Department of the Army
Secretary of Defense Deputy Secretary of Defense	United States Department of the Navy
Secretary of Defense Deputy Secretary of Defense	United States Department of the Air Force
Secretary of Defense Deputy Secretary of Defense	Joint Chiefs of Staff
Acquisition and Sustainment Under Secretary of Defense for Acquisition and Sustainment Deputy Under Secretary of Defense for Acquisition and Sustainment	Assistant Secretary of Defense (Acquisition); *Defense Contract Management Agency; *Defense Acquisition University *Joint Rapid Acquisition Cell
Acquisition and Sustainment Under Secretary of Defense for Acquisition and Sustainment Deputy Under Secretary of Defense for Acquisition and Sustainment	Assistant Secretary of Defense (Sustainment); *Director of the Office of Economic Adjustment; *Director of the Defense Logistics Agency
Acquisition and Sustainment Under Secretary of Defense for Acquisition and Sustainment Deputy Under Secretary of Defense for Acquisition and Sustainment	Assistant Secretary of Defense for Energy, Installations, and Environment/Chief Sustainability Officer; *Office of Local Defense Community Cooperation (OLDCC)
Acquisition and Sustainment Under Secretary of Defense for Acquisition and Sustainment Deputy Under Secretary of Defense for Acquisition and Sustainment	Assistant Secretary of Defense (Nuclear Deterrence, Chemical, and Biological Defense Policy and Programs); *Defense Threat Reduction Agency
Acquisition and Sustainment Under Secretary of Defense for Acquisition and Sustainment Deputy Under Secretary of Defense for Acquisition and Sustainment	Assistant Secretary of Defense for Industrial Policy; *Office of Small Business Programs
Acquisition and Sustainment Under Secretary of Defense for Acquisition and Sustainment Deputy Under Secretary of Defense for Acquisition and Sustainment	Joint Production Accelerator Cell Director of Special Programs
Research and Engineering Under Secretary of Defense for Research and Engineering Deputy Under Secretary of Defense for Research and Engineering	Assistant Secretary of Defense for Science and Technology
Research and Engineering Under Secretary of Defense for Research and Engineering Deputy Under Secretary of Defense for Research and Engineering	Assistant Secretary of Defense for Critical Technologies
Research and Engineering Under Secretary of Defense for Research and Engineering Deputy Under Secretary of Defense for Research and Engineering	Assistant Secretary of Defense for Mission Capabilities
Research and Engineering Under Secretary of Defense for Research and Engineering Deputy Under Secretary of Defense for Research and Engineering	Missile Defense Agency
Research and Engineering Under Secretary of Defense for Research and Engineering Deputy Under Secretary of Defense for Research and Engineering	DARPA
Policy Under Secretary of Defense for Policy Deputy Under Secretary of Defense for Policy	Assistant Secretary of Defense (Strategy, Plans, and Capabilities)
Policy Under Secretary of Defense for Policy Deputy Under Secretary of Defense for Policy	Assistant Secretary of Defense (International Security Affairs); *Secretary of Defense Representative in the United States Mission to NATO; *Secretary of Defense Representative to the Organization for Security and Co-operation in Europe
Policy Under Secretary of Defense for Policy Deputy Under Secretary of Defense for Policy	Assistant Secretary of Defense (Homeland Defense) and Global Strategic Affairs
Policy Under Secretary of Defense for Policy Deputy Under Secretary of Defense for Policy	Assistant Secretary of Defense (Special Operations and Low-Intensity Conflict)
Policy Under Secretary of Defense for Policy Deputy Under Secretary of Defense for Policy	Assistant Secretary of Defense (Indo-Pacific Security Affairs)
Policy Under Secretary of Defense for Policy Deputy Under Secretary of Defense for Policy	Defense POW/MIA Accounting Agency
Policy Under Secretary of Defense for Policy Deputy Under Secretary of Defense for Policy	Defense Security Cooperation Agency
Policy Under Secretary of Defense for Policy Deputy Under Secretary of Defense for Policy	Defense Policy Board Advisory Committee
Policy Under Secretary of Defense for Policy Deputy Under Secretary of Defense for Policy	Defense Technology Security Administration
Comptroller Under Secretary of Defense (Comptroller)/CFO Deputy Under Secretary of Defense (Comptroller)	Deputy Comptroller (Program/Budget)
Comptroller Under Secretary of Defense (Comptroller)/CFO Deputy Under Secretary of Defense (Comptroller)	Deputy Comptroller (Budget and Appropriation Affairs)
Comptroller Under Secretary of Defense (Comptroller)/CFO Deputy Under Secretary of Defense (Comptroller)	Deputy Comptroller (Enterprise Financial Transformation)
Comptroller Under Secretary of Defense (Comptroller)/CFO Deputy Under Secretary of Defense (Comptroller)	Deputy Chief Financial Officer
Comptroller Under Secretary of Defense (Comptroller)/CFO Deputy Under Secretary of Defense (Comptroller)	Director, Human Capital and Resource Management
Comptroller Under Secretary of Defense (Comptroller)/CFO Deputy Under Secretary of Defense (Comptroller)	Defense Contract Audit Agency
Comptroller Under Secretary of Defense (Comptroller)/CFO Deputy Under Secretary of Defense (Comptroller)	Defense Finance and Accounting Service
Personnel and Readiness Under Secretary of Defense for Personnel and Readiness Deputy Under Secretary of Defense for Personnel and Readiness	Joint Advertising Marketing Research & Studies (JAMRS)
Personnel and Readiness Under Secretary of Defense for Personnel and Readiness Deputy Under Secretary of Defense for Personnel and Readiness	Military Deputy to the Under Secretary of Defense (Personnel and Readiness); *Office of Diversity Management and Equal Opportunity; **Defense Equal Opportunity Management Institute; *Defense Suicide Prevention Office; *Personnel Risk Reduction Office
Personnel and Readiness Under Secretary of Defense for Personnel and Readiness Deputy Under Secretary of Defense for Personnel and Readiness	Assistant Secretary of Defense (Health Affairs); *Defense Health Agency; *Military Health System; **TRICARE Management Activity
Personnel and Readiness Under Secretary of Defense for Personnel and Readiness Deputy Under Secretary of Defense for Personnel and Readiness	Assistant Secretary of Defense (Manpower and Reserve Affairs); *Defense Commissary Agency; *Department of Defense Education Activity; **Department of Defense Dependents Schools; *Office of Total Force Planning & Requirements; *Transition to Veterans Program Office
Personnel and Readiness Under Secretary of Defense for Personnel and Readiness Deputy Under Secretary of Defense for Personnel and Readiness	Defense Human Resources Activity
Personnel and Readiness Under Secretary of Defense for Personnel and Readiness Deputy Under Secretary of Defense for Personnel and Readiness	DoD/VA Collaboration Office
Personnel and Readiness Under Secretary of Defense for Personnel and Readiness Deputy Under Secretary of Defense for Personnel and Readiness	Uniformed Services University of the Health Sciences
Personnel and Readiness Under Secretary of Defense for Personnel and Readiness Deputy Under Secretary of Defense for Personnel and Readiness	Office of the Chancellor for Education and Professional Development
Intelligence and Security Under Secretary of Defense for Intelligence and Security Deputy Under Secretary of Defense (Intelligence)	Director for Defense Intelligence (Warfighter Support)
Intelligence and Security Under Secretary of Defense for Intelligence and Security Deputy Under Secretary of Defense (Intelligence)	Director for Defense Intelligence (Intelligence & Security)
Intelligence and Security Under Secretary of Defense for Intelligence and Security Deputy Under Secretary of Defense (Intelligence)	Director for Defense Intelligence (Technical Collection & Special Programs)
Intelligence and Security Under Secretary of Defense for Intelligence and Security Deputy Under Secretary of Defense (Intelligence)	Director for Defense Intelligence (Intelligence Strategy, Programs & Resources)
Intelligence and Security Under Secretary of Defense for Intelligence and Security Deputy Under Secretary of Defense (Intelligence)	Defense Counterintelligence and Security Agency
Intelligence and Security Under Secretary of Defense for Intelligence and Security Deputy Under Secretary of Defense (Intelligence)	Defense Intelligence Agency
Intelligence and Security Under Secretary of Defense for Intelligence and Security Deputy Under Secretary of Defense (Intelligence)	National Geospatial-Intelligence Agency
Intelligence and Security Under Secretary of Defense for Intelligence and Security Deputy Under Secretary of Defense (Intelligence)	National Security Agency
Intelligence and Security Under Secretary of Defense for Intelligence and Security Deputy Under Secretary of Defense (Intelligence)	Central Security Service
Intelligence and Security Under Secretary of Defense for Intelligence and Security Deputy Under Secretary of Defense (Intelligence)	National Reconnaissance Office

=== Defense Agencies ===
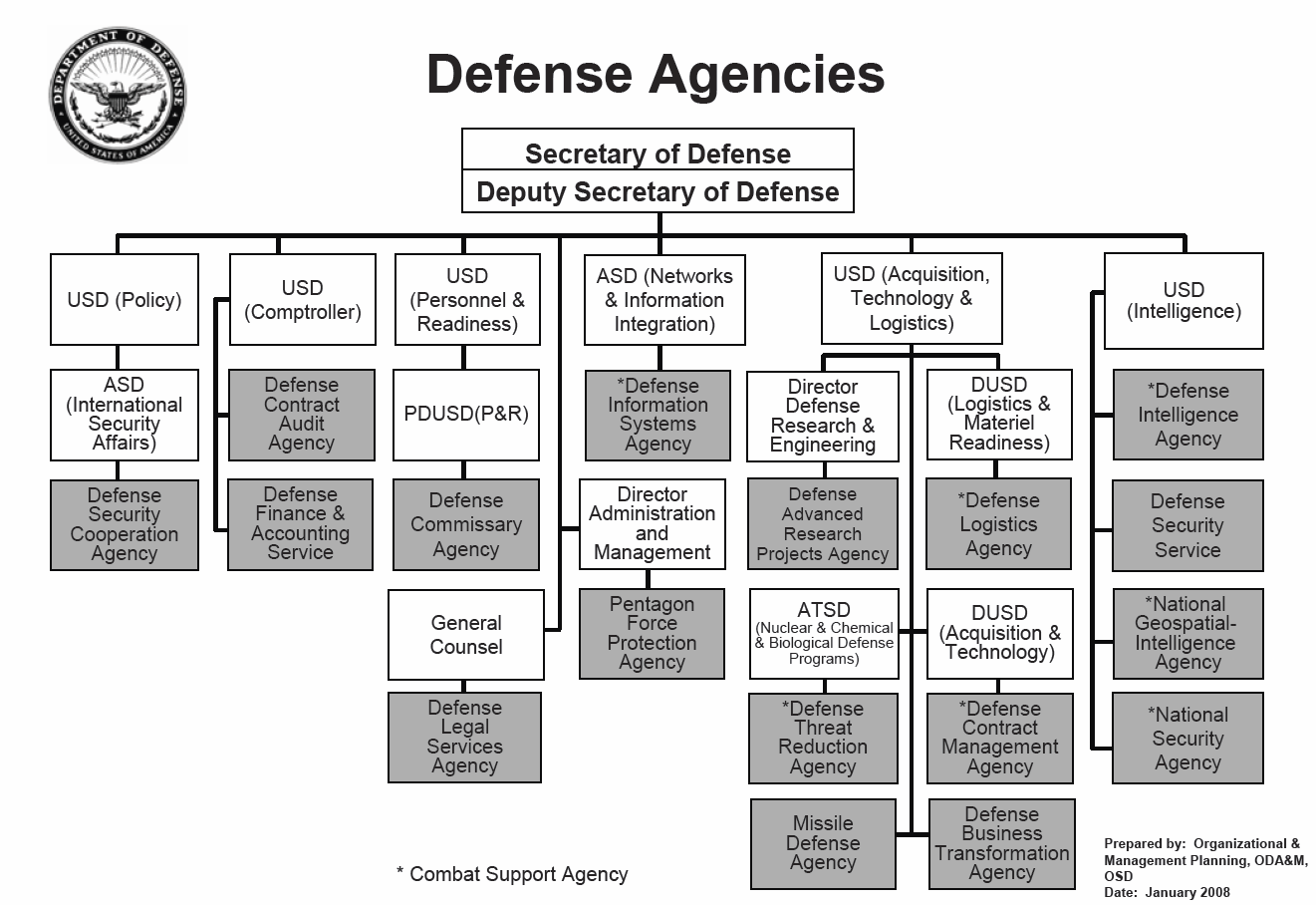
Defense Agencies within the Department of Defense

Defense Agencies are established as DoD Components by law, the President, or the Secretary of Defense to provide for the performance, on a DoD-wide basis, of a supply or service activity that is common to more than one Military Department when it is determined to be more effective, economical, or efficient to do so, pursuant to sections 101, 191(a), and 192 of Title 10 of the United States Code or when a responsibility or function is more appropriately assigned to a Defense Agency. Pursuant to section 191(b) Title 10, such organizations are designated as Defense Agencies. Each Defense Agency operates under the authority, direction, and control of the Secretary of Defense, through a Principal Staff Assistant in the Office of the Secretary of Defense.

On 1 March 2003 the Secretary of Defense lost Executive Agent responsibilities for the National Communications System, which was moved to the Department of Homeland Security. However the NCS still centralized its activities within the Department of Defense, since the human resources required by NCS (example: Military Departments) still reside within the Department of Defense, or for retention of practical maintenance. The NCS was finally disestablished in 2012.

Seal or Logo	Name	Acronym	Charter	Under the Authority of	Headquarters
	Defense Advanced Research Projects Agency	DARPA	DoDD 5134.10	Under Secretary of Defense for Acquisition and Sustainment	Arlington, Virginia
	Defense Commissary Agency	DeCA	DoDD 5105.55	Under Secretary of Defense for Personnel and Readiness	Fort Gregg-Adams, Virginia
	Defense Contract Audit Agency	DCAA	DoDD 5105.36	Under Secretary of Defense (Comptroller)	Fort Belvoir, Virginia
	Defense Contract Management Agency	DCMA	DoDD 5105.64	Under Secretary of Defense for Acquisition and Sustainment	Fort Gregg-Adams, Virginia
	Defense Finance and Accounting Service	DFAS	DoDD 5118.05	Under Secretary of Defense (Comptroller)	Arlington, Virginia
	Defense Information Systems Agency	DISA	DoDD 5105.19	Chief Information Officer	Arlington, Virginia
	Defense Intelligence Agency	DIA	DoDD 5105.21	Under Secretary of Defense for Intelligence	Joint Base Anacostia-Bolling, District of Columbia
	Defense Legal Services Agency	DLSA	DoDD 5145.04	General Counsel of the Department of Defense	The Pentagon
	Defense Logistics Agency	DLA	DoDD 5105.22	Under Secretary of Defense for Acquisition and Sustainment	Fort Belvoir, Virginia
	Defense Security Cooperation Agency	DSCA	DoDD 5105.65	Under Secretary of Defense for Policy	The Pentagon
	Defense Counterintelligence and Security Agency	DCSA	Executive Order 13869	Under Secretary of Defense for Intelligence	Quantico, Virginia
	Defense Threat Reduction Agency	DTRA	DoDD 5105.62	Under Secretary of Defense for Acquisition and Sustainment	Fort Belvoir, Virginia
	Missile Defense Agency	MDA	DoDD 5134.09	Under Secretary of Defense for Acquisition and Sustainment	The Pentagon
	National Geospatial-Intelligence Agency	NGA	DoDD 5105.60	Under Secretary of Defense for Intelligence	Springfield, Virginia
	National Reconnaissance Office	NRO	DoDD 5105.23	Under Secretary of Defense for Intelligence	Chantilly, Virginia
	National Security Agency; Central Security Service	NSA/CSS	DoDD 5100.20	Under Secretary of Defense for Intelligence	Fort Meade, Maryland
	Pentagon Force Protection Agency	PFPA	DoDD 5105.68	Director of Administration and Management	The Pentagon

=== Department of Defense Field Activities ===
Department of Defense Field Activities are established as DoD Components by law, the President, or the Secretary of Defense to provide for the performance, on a DoD-wide basis, of a supply or service activity that is common to more than one Military Department when it is determined to be more effective, economical, or efficient to do so, pursuant to sections 101, 191(a), and 192 of Title 10 of the United States Code. Pursuant to section 191(b) of Title 10, such organizations are designated as DoD Field Activities. Each DoD Field Activity operates under the authority, direction, and control of the Secretary of Defense, through a Principal Staff Assistant in the Office of the Secretary of Defense.

Seal or Logo	Name	Acronym	Charter	Under the Authority of	Headquarters
	Defense Media Activity	DMA	DoDD 5105.74	Assistant to the Secretary of Defense for Public Affairs	Fort Meade, MD
	Defense POW/MIA Accounting Agency	DPAA	DoDD 5110.10	Under Secretary of Defense for Policy	The Pentagon
	Defense Technical Information Center	DTIC	DoDD 5105.73	Under Secretary of Defense for Acquisition and Sustainment	Fort Belvoir, VA
	Defense Technology Security Administration	DTSA	DoDD 5105.72	Under Secretary of Defense for Policy	The Pentagon
	Department of Defense Education Activity	DoDEA	DoDD 1342.20	Under Secretary of Defense for Personnel and Readiness	Arlington, VA
	Department of Defense Human Resources Activity	DoDHRA	DoDD 5100.87	Under Secretary of Defense for Personnel and Readiness	Arlington, VA
	Department of Defense Test Resource Management Center	TRMC	DoDD 5105.71	Under Secretary of Defense for Acquisition and Sustainment	
	Office of Economic Adjustment	OEA	DoDD 3030.01	Under Secretary of Defense for Acquisition and Sustainment	Arlington, VA
	Washington Headquarters Services	WHS	DoDD 5110.04	Director of Administration and Management	The Pentagon

=== Military Departments ===
==== Department of the Army ====
The Department of the Army includes all elements of the U.S. Army

- Secretary of the Army

===== Headquarters, Department of the Army =====
- Office of the Secretary of the Army
- Chief of Staff of the Army

===== Army Field Organizations =====
- Army Commands
- Army Component Commands
- Field Operating Agencies
- Direct Reporting Units

==== Department of the Navy ====
The Department of the Navy includes all elements of the U.S. Navy and the U.S. Marine Corps

- Secretary of the Navy
  - Office of the Secretary of the Navy
- Under Secretary of the Navy

===== OPNAV =====
- Chief of Naval Operations
  - Office of the Chief of Naval Operations
  - United States Naval Observatory falls under the Chief of Naval Operations.
- Vice Chief of Naval Operations

===== Headquarters Marine Corps =====
- Commandant of the Marine Corps
- Headquarters Marine Corps (See also: Organization of the United States Marine Corps)

==== Department of the Air Force ====
The Department of the Air Force includes all elements of the United States Air Force and the United States Space Force

- Secretary of the Air Force
  - Office of the Secretary of the Air Force
- Under Secretary of the Air Force

===== Headquarters Air Force =====
- Chief of Staff of the Air Force
  - The Air Staff

===== Air Force Field Organizations =====
- Major Commands
- Direct Reporting Units
- Field Operating Agencies

===== Headquarters Space Force =====
- Chief of Space Operations
  - The Space Staff

===== Space Force Field Organizations =====
- Field commands

==== Organization of the Joint Chiefs of Staff ====
- Chairman of the Joint Chiefs of Staff
  - Vice Chairman of the Joint Chiefs of Staff
    - Joint Requirements Oversight Council
  - Joint Chiefs of Staff
  - The Joint Staff
    - Director of the Joint Staff
      - Vice Director of the Joint Staff
      - DOM- Directorate of Management
      - J1 – Personnel and Manpower
      - J2 – Intelligence
      - J3 – Operations
        - National Military Command Center
        - Alternate National Military Command Center
        - National Airborne Operations Center
      - J4 – Logistics
      - J5 – Strategic Plans and Policy
      - J6 – Command, Control, Communications and Computer Systems
      - J7 – Operational Plans and Joint Force Development
      - J8 – Force Structure, Resources, and Assessment
  - National Defense University
    - College of International Security Affairs
    - Industrial College of the Armed Forces
    - Information Resources Management College
    - Joint Forces Staff College
    - National War College
  - U.S. Delegation to the Inter-American Defense Board
  - U.S. Delegation to the United Nations Military Staff Committee
  - U.S. Representative at the NATO Military Committee
  - U.S. Section, Joint Mexico-U.S. Defense Commission

==== Unified Combatant Commands ====
There are eleven Unified Combatant Commands: seven regional and four functional. Africa Command became initially operational in October 2007, while Joint Forces Command was officially disestablished on August 4, 2011. Space Command was reestablished in August 2019.

Seal	Name	Acronym	Headquarters	Area of Responsibility	Other Role of CCDR
	United States Africa Command	AFRICOM	Kelley Barracks, Stuttgart, Germany; to be relocated to African continent or other location TBD	Africa excluding Egypt	
	United States Central Command	CENTCOM	MacDill Air Force Base, Florida	Egypt through the Persian Gulf region, into Central Asia, excluding Israel	
	United States European Command	EUCOM	Stuttgart, Germany	Europe, including Turkey, and Israel	Also Supreme Allied Commander Europe (SACEUR)
	United States Northern Command	NORTHCOM	Peterson Air Force Base, Colorado	North American homeland defense and coordinating homeland defense with federal and state civil authorities.	Also Commander of North American Aerospace Defense Command (NORAD) (bilateral U.S.-Canadian military command)
	United States Indo-Pacific Command	INDOPACOM	Camp H. M. Smith, Oahu, Hawaii	The Indo-Asia-Pacific region including Hawaii.	
	United States Southern Command	SOUTHCOM	Miami, Florida	Latin America and the Caribbean excluding Mexico and Puerto Rico	
	United States Space Command	SPACECOM	Peterson Air Force Base, Colorado	Outer Space	
	United States Cyber Command	CYBERCOM	Fort George G. Meade, Maryland	Provides cyber operations for the Army, Marine Corps, Navy, and Air Force.	Also Director of the National Security Agency/Chief of the Central Security Service
	United States Special Operations Command	SOCOM	MacDill Air Force Base, Florida	Provides special operations for the Army, Marine Corps, Navy, and Air Force.	
	United States Strategic Command	STRATCOM	Offutt Air Force Base, Nebraska	Deters strategic attack and employs forces, as directed, to guarantee the security of our Nation and our Allies.	
	United States Transportation Command	TRANSCOM	Scott Air Force Base, Illinois	Covers global mobility of all military assets for all regional commands.	

The Geographic Commands
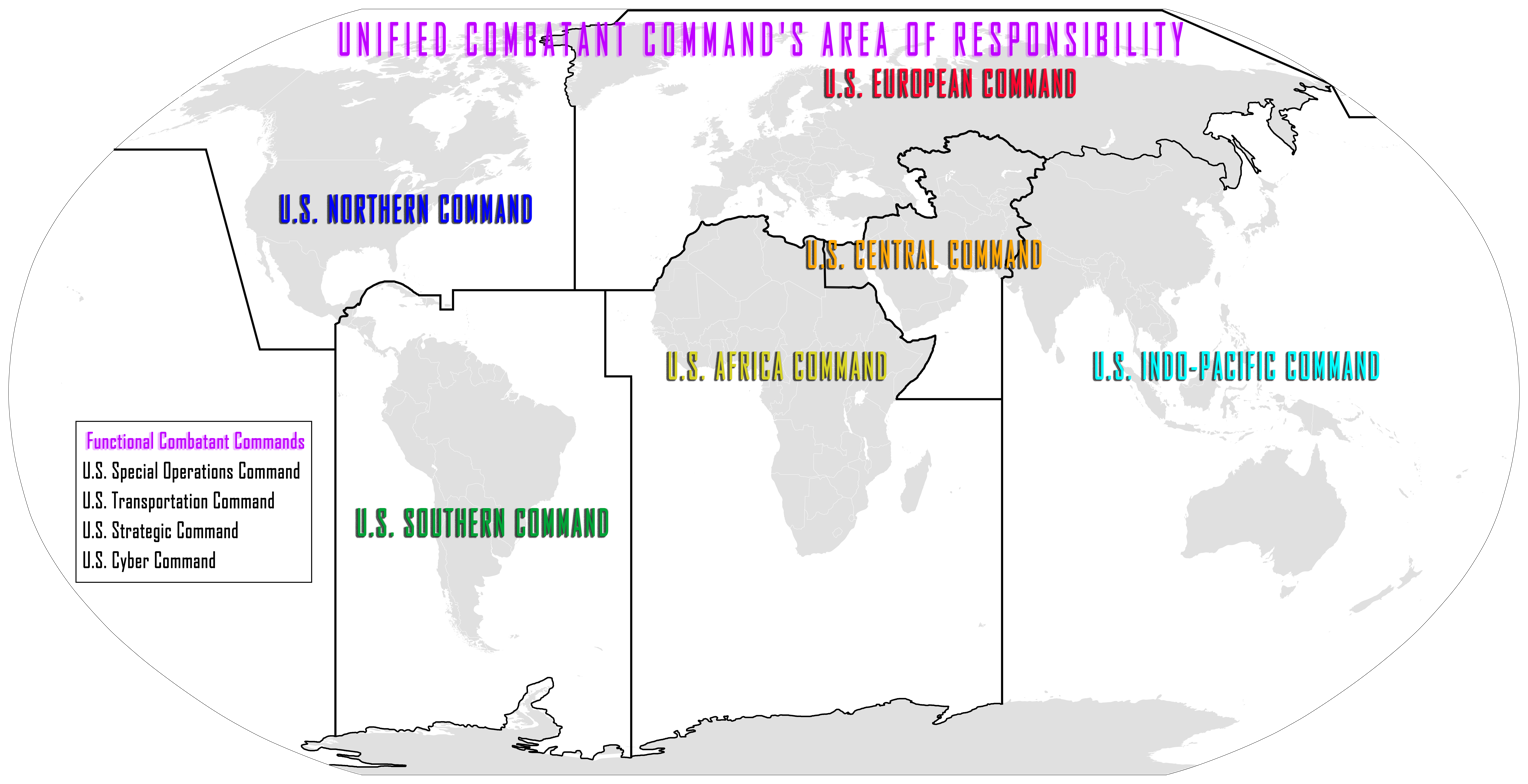

In 2007, a new geographical command for Africa was authorized. This proposed significant changes to the areas of responsibility for other adjacent geographical commands as shown in the accompanying graphic.

==== Office of the Inspector General of the Department of Defense ====
Seal of the Inspector General.

The Office of the Inspector General is an independent and objective unit within the Department of Defense that conducts and supervises audits and investigations relating to the programs and operations of the Department of Defense, pursuant to the responsibilities specified in title 5, U.S.C. Appendix and DoDD 5106.01.

- Inspector General of the Department of Defense
  - Defense Criminal Investigative Service

==== National Guard Bureau ====
Seal of the National Guard Bureau.

The National Guard Bureau (NGB) is a joint activity of the Department of Defense. The Chief of the National Guard Bureau is a principal advisor to the Secretary of Defense, through the Chairman of the Joint Chiefs of Staff, on matters involving non-federalized National Guard forces, and other matters as determined by the Secretary of Defense. For NGB matters pertaining to the Departments of the Army and Air Force's responsibilities in law or DoD policy, the Secretary of Defense normally exercises authority, direction, and control over the NGB through the Secretaries of the Army and the Air Force. The NGB is the focal point at the strategic level for National Guard matters that are not under the authority, direction, and control of the Secretaries of the Army or Air Force, including joint, interagency, and intergovernmental matters where the NGB acts through other DoD officials as specified in DoDD 5105.77.

- Chief of the National Guard Bureau
