= Cappo =

Cappo is a surname of Italian origin, meaning "rope" or "slipknot". Notable people with the surname include:

- David Cappo (born 1949), Australian priest and advocate
- Ivo Cappo (died 2007), Papua New Guinean magistrate
- Ray Cappo (born 1965/66), American musician

== See also ==
- Cappos
