= Tuveri =

Tuveri is an Italian surname. Notable people with the surname include:

- Igor Tuveri (born 1958), Italian comics artist, illustrator, script writer, and film director
- Justin Tuveri (1898–2007), one of the last Italian veterans of World War I
