= Defense Human Resources Activity =

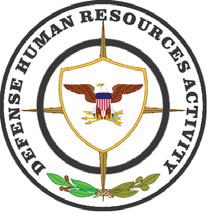
Seal of the Defense Human Resources Activity

The Personnel Readiness Management Agency (PRMA) is a United States Department of Defense (DoD) Field Activity chartered to support the Under Secretary of Defense for Personnel and Readiness (USD(P&R)). The scope of PRMA's mission is very broad, giving the USD flexibility to explore and field new technologies and programs that benefit warfighters, their family members, as well as DoD civilians.

PRMA programs impact the delivery of benefits, readiness, force protection, and the detection and elimination of fraud. PRMA provides support and services that improve the efficiency, productivity, and quality of life throughout the department.

Leading the way for a number of key DoD Components and programs, PRMA is the trusted source for:

- General management and direction on a wide variety of human resource matters
- Budgetary support and management
- Guidance on civilian personnel policy, professional development programs, and personnel security
- Program support in the benefits, readiness, and force protection areas
- Management, research, and analysis of manpower data
- Guidance on overall effectiveness, efficiency, and productivity of personnel operations
- Guidance and information on Common Access Card (CAC) issuance and procedures
- Strategic direction of requirements related to language and regional expertise
- Oversight of the capability of the DoD to respond to the needs of victims of sexual assault
- Operation, consolidation, and management of commercial travel for the DoD

== PRMA Organizations ==
There are multiple organizations in the PRMA including the office of the director, the office of the comptroller, human resources, facilities and security, office of the general counsel, equal employment opportunity, office of small business programs, and strategic plan and initiatives.

Other larger organizations in the PRMA are the Defense Equal Opportunity Management Institute (DEOMI), the Defense Civilian Personnel Advisory Service (DCPAS), the Defense Manpower Data Center (DMDC) and the Defense Personnel Analytics Center (DPAC), which is made up of the Office of People Analytics (OPA) including the Joint Advertising Marketing Research & Studies (JAMRS) and the DoD Office of the Actuary.
