= Jules W. Hurst III =

American politician

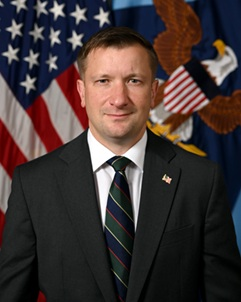
- Official portrait, August 2026

Under Secretary of Defense (Comptroller)/CFO
- Incumbent
- Assumed office August 12, 2026
- President: Donald Trump
- Preceded by: Michael J. McCord

Assistant Secretary of the Army (Manpower and Reserve Affairs)
- In office May 20, 2026 – August 12, 2026
- President: Donald Trump
- Preceded by: Agnes Gereben Schaefer

Acting Under Secretary of Defense for Personnel and Readiness
- In office March 17, 2025 – July 18, 2025
- Preceded by: Darin Selnick (acting)
- Succeeded by: Anthony Tata

Personal details
- Born: Virginia, United States

Jules W. Hurst III is an American government official who is serving as the Under Secretary of Defense (Comptroller)/CFO. He previously served as the Assistant Secretary of the Army (Manpower and Reserve Affairs). Hurst served as the acting Under Secretary of Defense for Personnel and Readiness from March 17 to July 18, 2025. As Comptroller, Hurst is the principal advisor to the Secretary of War on all budgetary and financial matters, including the development and execution of the Department’s annual budget.

== Early life ==
Hurst is a native of Virginia. He holds a Bachelor of Arts in Public Policy from the College of William and Mary, a Master of Arts in Security Studies from Georgetown School of Foreign Service, and a Master of Arts in Legislative Affairs from George Washington University.

== Career ==
Hurst’s military and civilian career include assignments on the Army Staff, with the Joint Special Operations Command Intelligence Brigade, the 75th Ranger Regiment, and U.S. Central Command. He deployed to Afghanistan four times as a senior intelligence officer supporting a Joint Special Operations Task Force. He also supported the initial stand-up of Project Maven, the Algorithmic Warfare Cross-Functional Team.

Before returning to the War Department, Hurst served as Legislative Director and Defense Advisor to Speaker of the House Mike Johnson (LA-04), overseeing policy in the Speaker’s personal office and advising him on defense matters.

He has published widely on great power competition, autonomous systems, artificial intelligence, and the future of warfare in outlets including War on the Rocks and Joint Force Quarterly.

He continues to serve in the United States Army Reserve as an FA59 Army Strategist.
