= Under Secretary of Defense for Personnel and Readiness =

United States government official

- Flag of an under secretary of defense

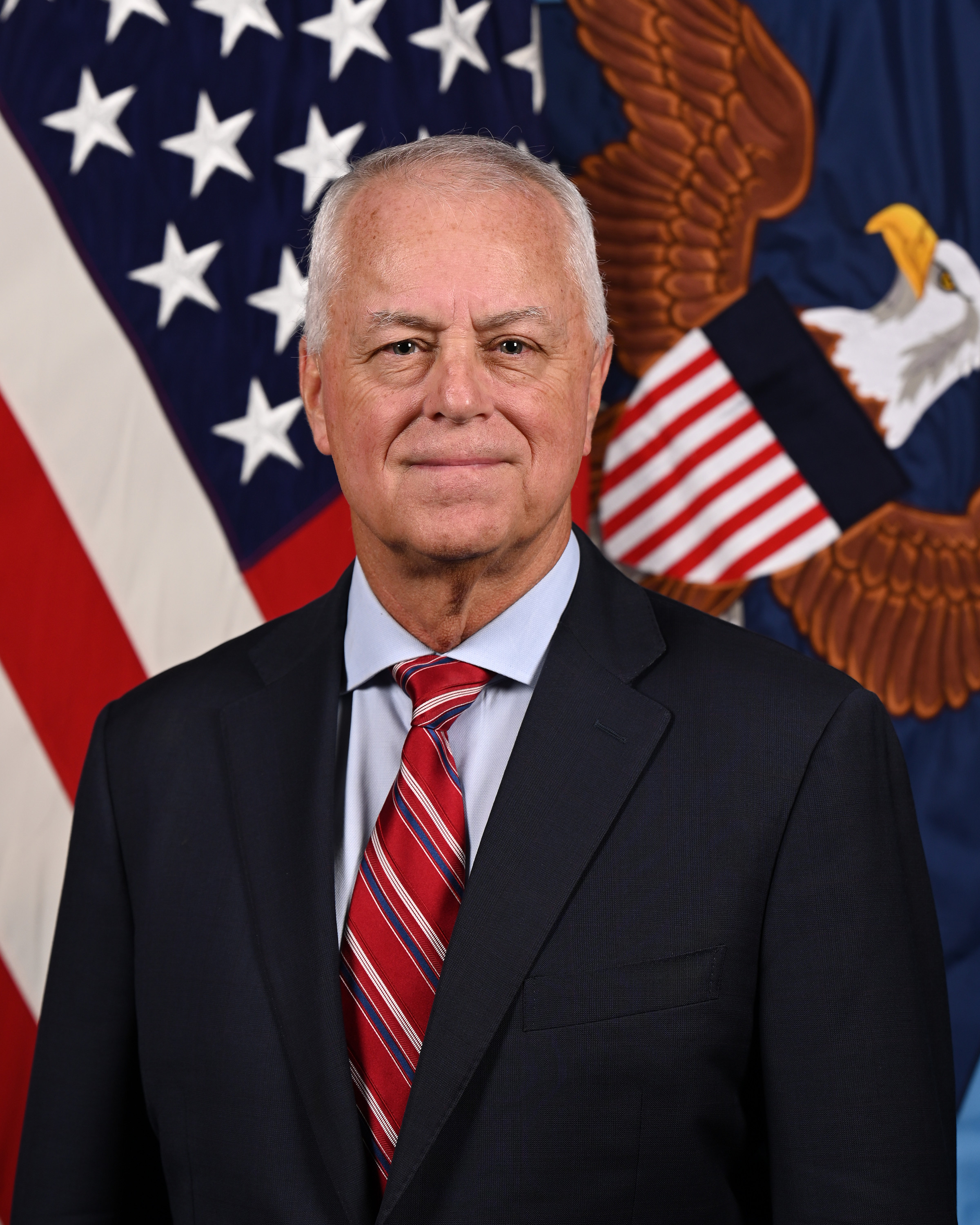
- Incumbent; Anthony Tata since 18 July 2025
- Department of Defense
- Abbreviation: USD (P&R)
- Member of: Office of the Secretary of Defense
- Reports to: Secretary of Defense
- Appointer: The president; with Senate advice and consent
- Term length: At the pleasure of the president
- Formation: 16 March 1994
- First holder: Edwin Dorn
- Salary: $165,300
- Website: Official website

The under secretary of defense for personnel and readiness, or USD (P&R) is a high-ranking civilian position in the Office of the Secretary of Defense (OSD) within the United States Department of Defense responsible for advising the secretary and deputy secretary of defense on recruitment, career development, pay and benefits, and oversight of the state of military readiness. The under secretary is appointed from civilian life by the president and confirmed by the Senate to serve at the pleasure of the President.

Additionally, the under secretary exercises day-to-day supervision of the Department of Defense Education Activity and the Defense Commissary Agency.

== Overview ==
The Office of the Under Secretary of Defense for Personnel and Readiness (OUSD(P&R)) is the principal staff element for the Department of Defense for all human resources, human capital development, and personnel logistics matters. The USD(P&R) has oversight of the Defense Commissary Agency, Department of Defense Education Activity, Defense Human Resources Activity, the Military Health System, and the Defense Travel Management Office. The USD(P&R) is also responsible for training, health affairs, National Guard and Reserve affairs, personnel requirements for weapons support, and military and civilian family matters, subject to the authority of the Secretary of Defense. Through the Deputy Assistant Secretary of Defense for Military Personnel Policy, the United States Military Entrance Processing Command also reports to the Under Secretary.

With the rank of Under Secretary, the USD(P&R) is a Level III position within the Executive Schedule. Since January 2010, the annual rate of pay for Level III is $165,300.

== History ==
The position was first mandated by the National Defense Authorization Act for Fiscal Year 1994 (P.L. 103-160), signed by President Clinton on 30 November 1993. Defense Directive 5124.2, passed 17 March 1994, officially established the position, incorporating the functions of the Assistant Secretary of Defense(Force Management and Personnel) and authorizing authority over the Assistant Secretary of Defense for Reserve Affairs and the Assistant Secretary of Defense for Health Affairs. Since the National Defense Authorization Act for Fiscal Year 2000 was signed on 5 October 1999, the Under Secretary has been responsible for establishing standards on deployment of units away from assigned duty stations, the length of time they may be away for a deployment away from assigned duty stations, and for establishing systems for reporting tracking deployments.

When created in 1993, the USD(P&R) assumed authority primarily over three DoD offices: the Assistant Secretary of Defense for Health Affairs, Assistant Secretary of Defense for Manpower and Reserve Affairs, and Assistant Secretary of Defense for Readiness and Force Management. The ASD(FMP) has since been abolished, its responsibilities assumed by other officials reporting to the USD(P&R).

== Reporting officials ==
Officials reporting to the USD (P&R) include:

- Deputy Under Secretary of Defense for Personnel and Readiness
- Military Deputy to the Under Secretary of Defense for Personnel and Readiness
  - Director, Office of Diversity Management and Equal Opportunity
    - Defense Equal Opportunity Management Institute
  - Director, Defense Suicide Prevention Office
  - Director, Personnel Risk Reduction Office
- Assistant Secretary of Defense for Readiness
- Assistant Secretary of Defense for Health Affairs
  - Military Health System
  - Deputy Assistant Secretary of Defense for Wounded Warrior Care & Transition Policy
- Assistant Secretary of Defense for Manpower and Reserve Affairs
  - Director, Defense Commissary Agency
  - Director, Department of Defense Education Activity
  - Deputy Assistant Secretary of Defense for Civilian Personnel Policy
  - Deputy Assistant Secretary of Defense for Military Personnel Policy
  - Deputy Assistant Secretary of Defense for Military Community and Family Policy
  - Deputy Assistant Secretary of Defense for Readiness
  - Director, Office of Total Force Planning & Requirements
  - Director, Transition to Veterans Program Office
- Director, Defense Human Resources Activity
- Director, DoD/VA Collaboration Office

== Budget ==
=== Budget totals ===
The annual budget for the USD (P&R) is contained in the Office of the Secretary of Defense's (OSD) budget, under the Defense-Wide Operation and Maintenance (O&M) account.

USD Personnel and Readiness Budget, FY 10-12 ($ in thousands)
Line Item	FY10 Actual	FY11 Estimate	FY12 Request
Core OSD Operating Program
Civilian Pay and Benefits, USD (P&R)	23,688	35,457	24,816
Program Structure
Contracts and other Support Services	1,000	1,007	995
Advancing Diversity and Equal Opportunity Program	8,500	8,925	9,667
Assistant Secretary of Defense (Health Affairs)	2,219	2,393	1,131
Assistant Secretary of Defense (Reserve Affairs)	2,364	2,691	2,018
Combatant Commander's Exercise	688,632	760,837	766,450
Defense Safety Oversight Council	10,692	12,615	12,550
Defense Readiness Reporting System	13,354	6,900	3,882
Lost Work Days System	3,230	3,060	3,032
Military Personnel Policy Naturalization Support	5,799	6,345	6,463
Military Spouse Intern Program	0	17,500	16,689
Studies Program	0	2,820	2,792
Training Transformation	6,563	6,035	5,112
Wounded Warrior Care and Transition Policy	43,664	79,412	77,623
Travel	1,338	1,402	817
Overseas Contingency Operations
OCO OUSD (Intel)	2,064	0	0
Totals
Total Budget	813,107	947,399	934,037

=== Budget features ===
- Contracts and other Support Services - Funds contracts and other support services for mission requirements, including Intergovernmental Personnel Act requirements
- Advancing Diversity and Equal Opportunity Program - Funding to increase the number of people with targeted disabilities in the federal civilian workforce to support the DoD goal of two percent DoD-wide, emphasizing the benefit for wounded service members
- Assistant Secretary of Defense (Health Affairs) - ASD (HA) is the principal medical staff advisor to the Secretary of Defense and principal program manager for all DoD health matters to include medical readiness, health care delivery, preventive medicine, medical military construction, and the procurement, development, training and retention of medical military and civilian personnel
- Assistant Secretary of Defense (Reserve Affairs) - Funds managed by ASD (RA) are utilized to conduct valuable research and analysis for specific topics and issues that arise related to the National Guard and military Reserve components
- Combatant Commander's Exercise Engagement and Training Transformation (CE2T2) - The program was established as a result of direction from the Quadrennial Defense Review that re-aligned and consolidated joint training programs and applies resulting efficiencies against new mission areas and existing joint training shortfalls
- Defense Safety Oversight Council (DSOC) - Supports safety initiatives to reduce and prevent injuries to Defense Department personnel
- Defense Readiness Reporting System (DRRS) - Allows for quick analysis of force capability issues, effective program oversight, operator training, and data maintenance
- Lost Work Days System - Lost Work Days aims to increase operational readiness by providing data and analysis to eliminate preventable mishaps
- Military Personnel Policy (MPP) Naturalization Support - Funding to pay U.S. Citizenship and Immigration Services in the United States Department of Homeland Security to not charge fees to military members applying for naturalization to become US citizens
- Military Spouse Intern Program - Assists eligible spouses of active duty military in obtaining positions in federal agencies by paying the spouses' salary and benefits for the first year of employment
- Studies Program - The Department contracts for assistance in facilitating studies that improve the overall operation and efficiency of the OUSD(P&R) and the programs over which it exercises oversight
- Training Transformation - Provides oversight of the Department's Joint training effort
- Wounded Warrior Care and Transition Policy (WWCTP) - Funds WWCTP operations that provide OSD-level oversight of the development and implementation of comprehensive disability, non-medical care and case management, and transition programs, policies and standards Department-wide
- Travel - Funds employee travel to support USD(P&R) mission

== Office holders ==
Under Secretaries of Defense (Personnel and Readiness)
No.	Portrait	Name	Tenure	Secretary(ies) of Defense Served Under	President(s) Served Under
1		Edwin Dorn	16 March 1994 – 7 July 1997	William Perry	Bill Clinton
1		Edwin Dorn	16 March 1994 – 7 July 1997	William Cohen	Bill Clinton
2		Rudy de Leon	5 August 1997 – 31 March 2000	William Cohen	Bill Clinton
-		Charles Cragin (acting)	31 March 2000 – 23 May 2000	William Cohen	Bill Clinton
3		Bernard D. Rostker	23 May 2000 – 19 January 2001	William Cohen	Bill Clinton
-		Charles Cragin (acting)	20 January 2001 – 31 May 2001	Donald Rumsfeld	George W. Bush
4		David S. C. Chu	1 June 2001 – 20 January 2009	Donald Rumsfeld	George W. Bush
4		David S. C. Chu	1 June 2001 – 20 January 2009	Robert Gates	George W. Bush
-		Gail H. McGinn (acting)	21 January 2009 – 8 February 2010	Robert Gates	Barack Obama
5		Clifford Stanley	9 February 2010 – 27 October 2011	Robert Gates	Barack Obama
5		Clifford Stanley	9 February 2010 – 27 October 2011	Leon Panetta	Barack Obama
-		Jo Ann Rooney (acting)	27 October 2011 – 8 June 2012	Leon Panetta	Barack Obama
6		Erin C. Conaton	8 June 2012 – 31 December 2012	Leon Panetta	Barack Obama
7		Jessica Wright	1 January 2013 – 31 March 2015	Leon Panetta	Barack Obama
7		Jessica Wright	1 January 2013 – 31 March 2015	Chuck Hagel	Barack Obama
7		Jessica Wright	1 January 2013 – 31 March 2015	Ash Carter	Barack Obama
-		Brad Carson (acting)	2 April 2015 – 8 April 2016	Ash Carter	Barack Obama
-	Peter Levine (DOD) Headshot	Peter Levine (acting)	8 April 2016 – 20 January 2017	Ash Carter	Barack Obama
-		Anthony Kurta (acting)	20 January 2017 – 30 November 2017	Jim Mattis	Donald Trump
8		Robert Wilkie	30 November 2017 – 30 July 2018	Jim Mattis	Donald Trump
-		Stephanie Barna (acting)	30 July 2018 – 22 October 2018	Jim Mattis	Donald Trump
-		James N. Stewart (acting)	22 October 2018 – 13 December 2019	Jim Mattis	Donald Trump
-		James N. Stewart (acting)	22 October 2018 – 13 December 2019	Mark Esper	Donald Trump
-		Matthew Donovan (acting)	13 December 2019 – 3 March 2020	Mark Esper	Donald Trump
-		Alexis Lasselle Ross (acting)	3 March 2020 – 23 March 2020	Mark Esper	Donald Trump
9		Matthew Donovan	23 March 2020 – 20 January 2021	Mark Esper	Donald Trump
-		Virginia S. Penrod (acting)	20 January 2021 – 24 August 2021	Lloyd Austin	Joe Biden
10		Gil Cisneros	24 August 2021 – 8 September 2023	Lloyd Austin	Joe Biden
-		Ashish Vazirani (acting)	8 September 2023 – 20 January 2025	Lloyd Austin	Joe Biden
-		Darin Selnick (acting)	20 January 2025 – 17 March 2025	Pete Hegseth	Donald Trump
-		Jules W. Hurst III (acting)	17 March 2025 – 18 July 2025	Pete Hegseth	Donald Trump
11		Anthony Tata	18 July 2025 – Present	Pete Hegseth	Donald Trump

== Principal Deputy ==
The Principal Deputy Under Secretary of Defense for Personnel and Readiness (PDUSD(P&R)) is the Under Secretary's chief staff assistant. PDUSD (P&R) is delegated full power and authority to act for the USD(P&R) and exercise the powers of the USD(P&R) on any and all matters that the USD(P&R) is authorized to act, except in those areas where delegation of the USD(P&R) authority is otherwise restricted by higher authority or prohibited by law.

Established as the Deputy Under Secretary of Defense (Personnel and Readiness) by the National Defense Authorization Act for FY 2002 (P.L. 107-107), the post took over the duties of the Assistant Secretary of Defense for Force Management Policy, which was then abolished. The DUSD(P&R) was re-designated Principal Deputy Under Secretary of Defense (Personnel and Readiness), or PDUSD(P&R) in July 2003 by DoD Directive 5124.8. As of 2012, the position again holds the rank of Principal Deputy Under Secretary.

Principal Deputy Under Secretaries of Defense for Personnel and Readiness
Name	Tenure	USD(P&R) served under	SecDef(s) served under	President(s) served under
Charles S. Abell	14 November 2002 – 11 July 2006	David S. C. Chu	Donald H. Rumsfeld	George W. Bush
Michael L. Dominguez	11 July 2006 – 20 January 2009	David S. C. Chu	Donald H. Rumsfeld	George W. Bush
William J. Carr (acting)	20 January 2009 – 8 February 2010	Gail McGinn (acting)	Robert M. Gates	Barack Obama
Lynn C. Simpson (performing the duties of)	8 February 2010 – 2 June 2011	Clifford Stanley	Robert M. Gates	Barack Obama
Jo Ann Rooney	2 June 2011 - 24 May 2012	Clifford Stanley	Leon Panetta	Barack Obama
Vacant	24 May 2012 – 30 July 2014	Jessica L. Wright	Chuck Hagel	Barack Obama
Laura Junor	31 July 2014 – 15 May 2015	Jessica L. Wright; Brad Carson (acting)	Chuck Hagel; Ashton Carter	Barack Obama
Stephanie Barna (acting)	8 April 2016 – 20 January 2017	Peter Levine (acting)	Ashton Carter	Barack Obama
William G. Bushman (performing the duties of)	29 July 2019 – 20 January 2021	James N. Stewart (acting); Matthew Donovan (acting); Alexis Lasselle Ross (acting); Matthew Donovan	Mark Esper	Donald Trump
Julie Blanks (performing the duties of)	20 January 2021 – 13 July 2022	Virginia S. Penrod (acting); Gil Cisneros	Lloyd Austin	Joe Biden
Ashish Vazirani	13 July 2022 – 20 January 2025	Gil Cisneros	Lloyd Austin	Joe Biden
Jules W. Hurst III (performing the duties of)	20 January 2025 – 17 March 2025	Darin Selnick (acting)	Pete Hegseth	Donald Trump
Tim Dill (performing the duties of)	17 March 2025 – 18 July 2025	Jules W. Hurst III (acting)	Pete Hegseth	Donald Trump
Merlynn Carson (performing the duties of)	18 July 2025 – 25 September 2025	Anthony Tata	Pete Hegseth	Donald Trump
Sean D. O'Keffe	25 September 2025 – Present	Anthony Tata	Pete Hegseth	Donald Trump
