= Anthony Kurta =

American Navy admiral and government official (born 1959)

Anthony M. Kurta
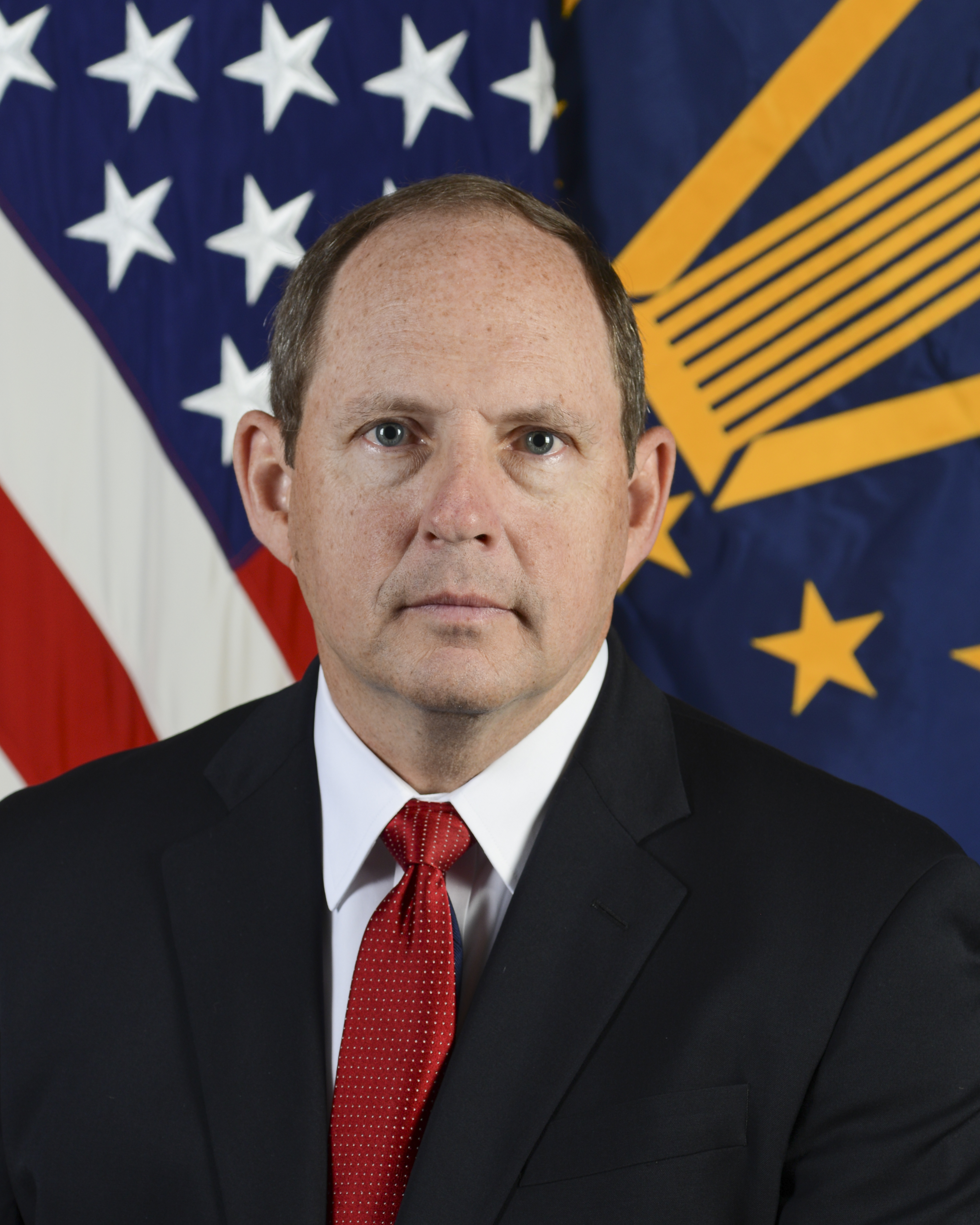
- Official portrait, 2014

Acting Under Secretary of Defense for Personnel and Readiness
- In office January 20, 2017 – November 30, 2017
- President: Donald Trump
- Preceded by: Peter Levine
- Succeeded by: Robert Wilkie

Deputy Assistant Secretary of Defense for Military Personnel Policy
- In office September 8, 2014 – January 20, 2017
- President: Barack Obama

Personal details
- Born: September 4, 1959 (age 66) Deer Lodge, Montana
- Education: United States Naval Academy; Georgetown University
- Awards: Defense Superior Service Medal; Legion of Merit; Meritorious Service Medal; Navy and Marine Corps Commendation Medal; Navy and Marine Corps Achievement Medal; Secretary of Defense Meritorious Civilian Service Award; Distinguished Service Medal

Military service
- Allegiance: United States
- Branch/service: United States Navy
- Years of service: 1981–2013
- Rank: Rear Admiral

Anthony Michael Kurta (born September 4, 1959) is a retired United States Navy Rear Admiral and government official who served as the acting Under Secretary of Defense for Personnel and Readiness in 2017. He previously served as Deputy Assistant Secretary of Defense for Military Personnel Policy from 2014 to 2017.

Kurta is the son of John Anthony Kurta (January 27, 1922 – June 17, 1993) and Virginia Elizabeth (Malone) Kurta (May 3, 1922 – January 12, 1970). He was born in Deer Lodge, Montana and raised in Columbia Falls, Montana. Kurta graduated from the United States Naval Academy in 1981. He later earned an M.A. in National Security Studies from Georgetown University.

Kurta served 32 years on active duty as a Navy Surface Warfare Officer, during which time he commanded the USS Sentry (MCM-3), USS Guardian (MCM-5), USS Warrior (MCM-10), USS Carney, Destroyer Squadron Two Four, and Combined Joint Task Force – Horn of Africa. He is a recipient of the Defense Superior Service Medal, Legion of Merit, Meritorious Service Medal, Distinguished Service Medal, Navy and Marine Corps Commendation Medal, Navy and Marine Corps Achievement Medal, and the Secretary of Defense Meritorious Civilian Service Award.

Kurta's nomination to be a Principal Deputy Under Secretary of Defense was reported favorably by the United States Senate Committee on Armed Services on November 16, 2017 but failed to receive consideration by the full Senate. The nomination was withdrawn on September 28, 2018.
