= Cappos =

Cappos is a surname. Notable people with the surname include:

- Justin Cappos (born 1977), American computer scientist and cybersecurity expert
- Scott Cappos (born 1969), Canadian shot putter

== See also ==
- Cappo
