= Darin Selnick =

American politician

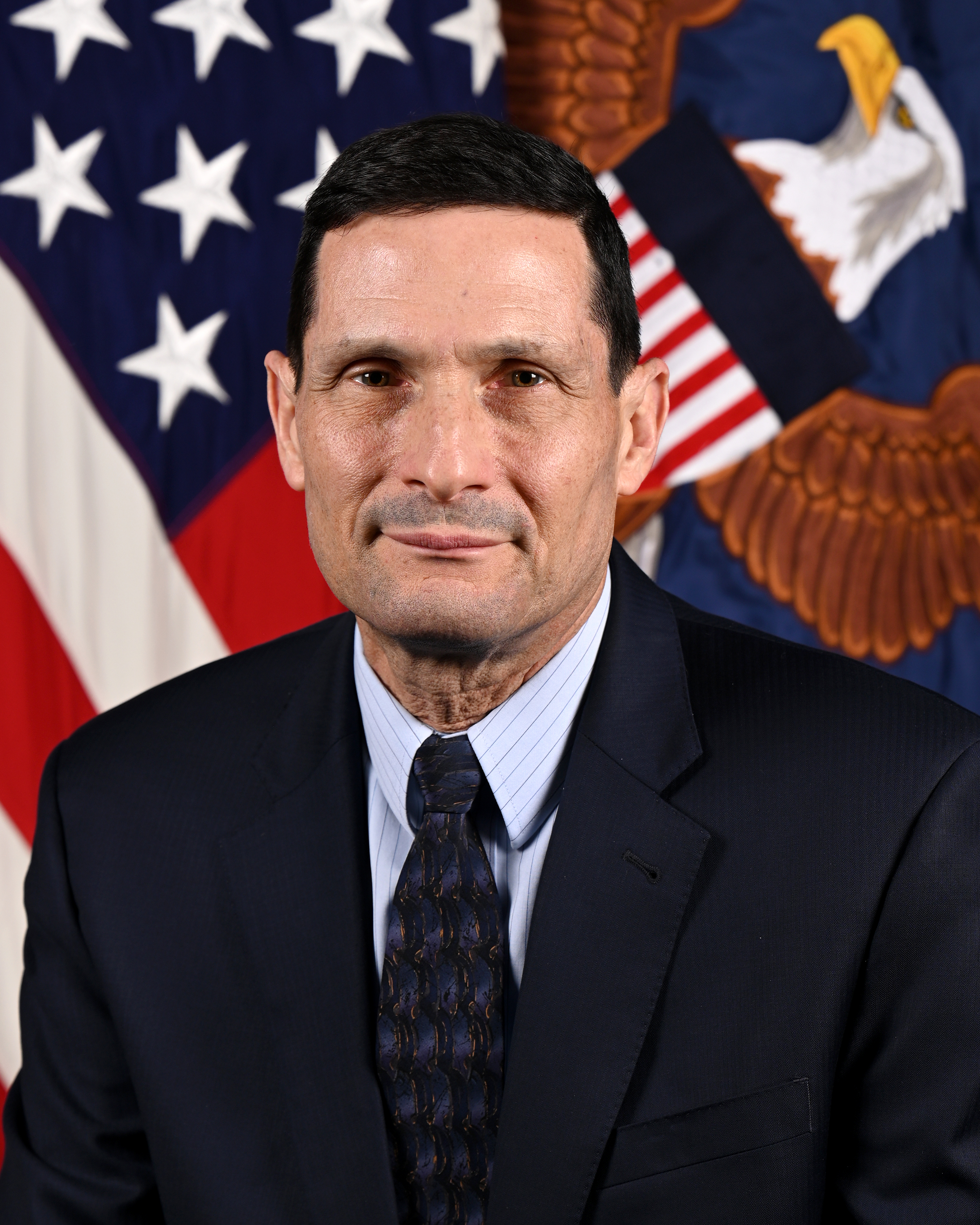
- Official portrait, 2025

Acting Under Secretary of Defense for Personnel and Readiness
- In office January 20, 2025 – March 17, 2025
- Preceded by: Ashish Vazirani (acting)
- Succeeded by: Jules W. Hurst III (acting)

Military service
- Allegiance: United States
- Branch/service: United States Air Force
- Years of service: 1985–1992
- Rank: Captain
- Unit: 1022d Combat Crew Training Squadron
- Battles/wars: Gulf War

Darin Selnick is an American public official and Air Force veteran who served in high-ranking roles at the Pentagon until his suspension on April 15, 2025.

== Early life, education, and military service ==
Selnick served in the U.S. Air Force from 1985–1992, attaining the rank of Captain. During Operation Desert Shield/Desert Storm, he served at Falcon Air Force Base as part of the 1022d Combat Crew Training Squadron.

== Career ==
From 2001 to 2009, Selnick was an appointee at the Department of Veterans Affairs. Selnick was appointed the Director of the Center for Faith-Based and Community Initiatives for the Department of Veterans Affairs in July 2004. He also served as VA liaison to the White House Office of Faith-Based and Community Initiatives, Special Assistant to the Secretary, and Associate Dean, VA Learning University.

Selnick was a Commissioner on the Commission on Care, which was established by Congress to examine how VA can better deliver health care to veterans.

From 2017 to 2018, Selnick worked as the Veterans Affairs Advisor on the Domestic Policy Council at the White House. From 2018 to 2019, he served as a senior advisor to the Secretary of the Department of Veterans Affairs (VA). During his tenure with the VA, Selnick came under scrutiny for incurring travel costs to Washington, DC while living in California.

Selnick was a senior adviser to Concerned Veterans of America from 2019 to 2024. He has contributed opinion pieces to several media outlets, including Fox News and The Hill.

In January 2025, Selnick was named Senior Advisor to Secretary of Defense Pete Hegseth. After temporarily serving as Performing the Duties of (PTDO) Under Secretary of Defense for Personnel and Readiness, he was named deputy chief of staff to the Secretary.

In February 2025, Selnick sought to remove transgender people from the U.S. military, stating that "medical, surgical, and mental health constraints on individuals who have a current diagnosis or history of, or exhibit symptoms consistent with, gender dysphoria are incompatible with the high mental and physical standards necessary for military service."

=== April 2025 suspension ===
On April 14, 2025, Selnick was suspended and placed on administrative leave. At the time of his suspension, Reuters reported that Selnick was suspended as part of a Pentagon investigation into leaks of classified and sensitive information. A senior DOD official confirmed that Selnick was placed on leave for "unauthorized disclosures."

On April 19, 2025, Selnick released a joint statement with Dan Caldwell and Colin Carroll, who were also fired, calling attacks against them "baseless" and expressing their continued support for the Trump-Vance administration. They also indicated that they had not been officially informed why they were fired.

== Personal life ==
Selnick is married and lives in California. He is Jewish.
