= Ashish Vazirani =

American government official

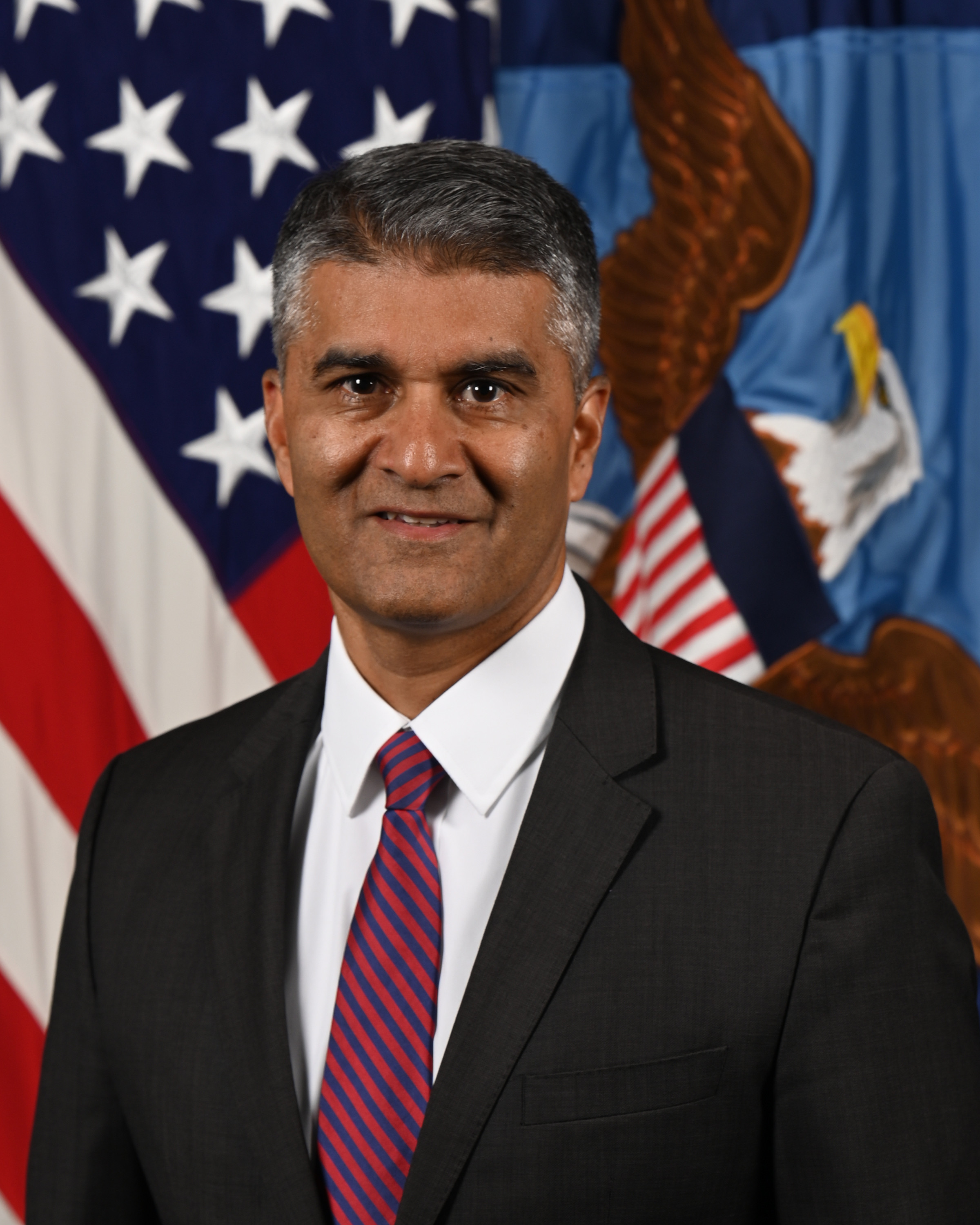
- Official portrait, 2022

Deputy Under Secretary of Defense for Personnel and Readiness
- In office July 13, 2022 – January 20, 2025
- President: Joe Biden
- Preceded by: Laura Junor (2015)
- Succeeded by: Sean D. O'Keffe

Senior Official Performing the Duties of Under Secretary of Defense for Personnel and Readiness
- In office September 8, 2023 – January 20, 2025
- President: Joe Biden
- Preceded by: Gil Cisneros
- Succeeded by: Darin Selnick (Acting)

Personal details
- Born: Ashish S. Vazirani India
- Education: Vanderbilt University (BD); McCormick School of Engineering (ME); Kellogg School of Management (MBA)

Military service
- Allegiance: United States
- Branch/service: United States Navy
- Years of service: 1986–1993
- Unit: Submarine

Ashish S. Vazirani is an American government official who had served Deputy Under Secretary of Defense for Personnel and Readiness. He previously served Performing the Duties of Under Secretary of Defense for Personnel and Readiness.

== Early life and education ==
Vazirani was born in India. His family immigrated to the United States when he was 3 years old. He grew up in Silver Spring, Maryland. He holds a Bachelor’s degree in Mechanical Engineering from Vanderbilt University, a Master of Engineering from the McCormick School of Engineering at Northwestern University, and an M.B.A. from the Kellogg School of Management at Northwestern University.

== Career ==
Vazirani served on active duty in the United States Navy as a Submarine Officer from 1986 to 1993. He served as a member of the Board of Advisors of the Global War on Terrorism Memorial Foundation. Vazirani served as the principal staff assistant and advisor to the Secretary of Defense for force readiness; force management; health affairs; National Guard and Reserve component affairs; education and training; and military and civilian personnel requirements and management, including equal opportunity, morale, welfare, recreation, and quality of life matters.

=== Biden administration ===
In September 2021, Biden nominated Ashish Vazirani to deputy under secretary of defense for personnel and readiness role at Department of Defense. He was confirmed as the Deputy Under Secretary of Defense for Personnel and Readiness on July 12, 2022. In September 8, 2023, Ashish Vazirani became acting Under Secretary of Defense for Personnel and Readiness.

== Personal life ==
Vazirani and his wife live in Silver Spring, Maryland. They have an adult son and daughter.
