= Čestmír Loukotka =

Czech ethnologist and linguist (1895–1966)

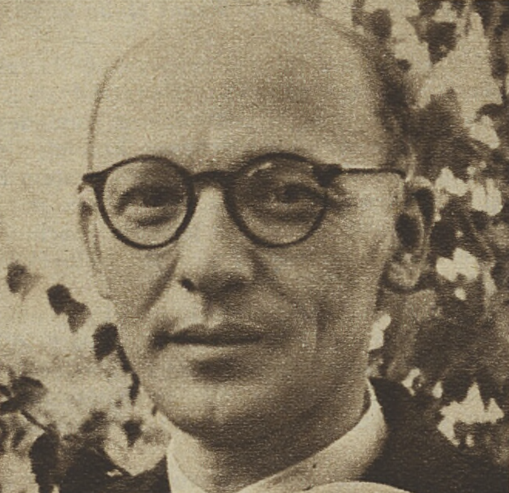
- Čestmír in 1941
- Born: 12 November 1895
- Died: 13 April 1966 (aged 70)
- Occupation: Linguist
- Children: Jarmila Loukotková

Academic background
- Influences: Paul Rivet

Academic work
- Notable works: Classification of South American Indian languages (1968)

Čestmír Loukotka (12 November 1895 – 13 April 1966) was a Czechoslovak linguist and ethnologist.

== Career ==
Loukotka was a student of Bedřich Hrozný, who greatly influenced him; his work The Development of Writing corrects several of his errors.

Loukotka proposed a classification for the languages of South America based on several previous works. This classification contained many unpublished materials and therefore greatly improved upon previous classifications. He divided the languages of South America and the Caribbean into 77 different families, based upon similarities of vocabulary and available lists. His classification of 1968 is the most influential and was based upon two previous schemes (1935, 1944), which were similar to those proposed by Paul Rivet (whom he was a student of), although the number of families was increased to 94 and 117.

In 1947, he was elected a permanent member of the Société des Américanistes and, in 1958, he became the first European member of the Brazilian Anthropological Society, and later a member of the Académie Française. His life and travels are featured in the book Na Trilha dos Viajantes Tchecos: Expedições pelo Brasil (transl. On the Trail of Czech Travelers: Expeditions through Brazil).

== Personal life ==
His daughter was the writer and translator Jarmila Loukotková.
