= Jo Ann Rooney =

American educator

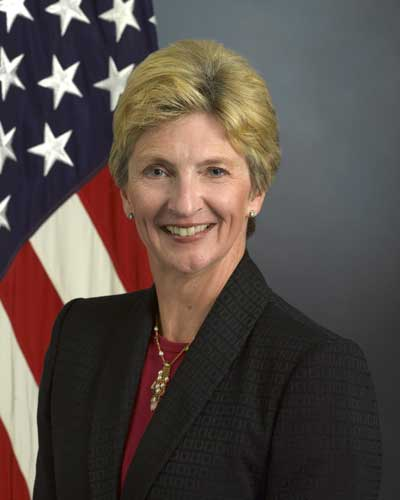

24th President of Loyola University Chicago
- In office August 1, 2016 – September 30, 2022
- Preceded by: Michael J. Garanzini
- Succeeded by: Mark Reed

Deputy Under Secretary of Defense for Personnel and Readiness
- In office June 2, 2011 – May 24, 2012
- Preceded by: Michael L. Dominguez
- Succeeded by: Laura Junor (2015)

President of Mt. Ida College
- In office July 2010 – May 2011

President of Spalding University
- In office September 27, 2003 – July 2010

Personal details
- Born: March 23, 1961 (age 65) Hazleton, Pennsylvania
- Education: Boston University School of Management (BS); Suffolk University (JD); Boston University (LLM); University of Pennsylvania (EdD)
- Profession: Higher education
- Website: Office of the President

Jo Ann Rooney (born March 23, 1961) is an American educator with a background in higher education, law, business, health care, and public service. On May 23, 2016, she was named the 24th president of Loyola University Chicago, a Jesuit, Catholic university in Chicago, Illinois. Rooney is the first lay, non-Jesuit president of the university in its history and began her term as president on August 1, 2016. On August 23, 2021, she announced in a statement that the current school year will be her last as President of the University. Dr. Rooney's tenure at Loyola ended on September 30, 2022.

Prior to her appointment at Loyola, Rooney was the managing director at Huron Consulting Group in Chicago with responsibility for developing strategies to advance Huron Healthcare's Federal Government Healthcare Sector consulting practice.

Rooney has served as a board member with a variety of civic and corporate organizations, including the Board of Directors of the Catholic Education Foundation, and as vice chair of Jewish Hospital & St. Mary's HealthCare—a Catholic Health Initiatives organization—in Louisville, Kentucky.

== Background ==
Born in Hazleton, Pennsylvania, Rooney graduated from West Hazleton High School in 1979. She attended Boston University School of Management, where she obtained a Bachelor of Science with a finance concentration in 1983. Rooney attended law school and holds a Juris Doctor from Suffolk University Law School in 1987 and a Master of Laws in taxation from the Boston University School of Law in 1991. She is a member of the American Bar Association and three state bar associations.

In addition to her law background, Rooney also holds a Doctor of Education degree in higher education management from the University of Pennsylvania in 2005.

== Work in higher education ==
In 2002, Rooney became the eighth president of Spalding University, a private, Catholic, doctoral-level university in Louisville, Kentucky. Her inauguration was held on September 27, 2003.

During her eight-year tenure at Spalding, Rooney is credited with turning around an institution facing severe financial challenges, stabilizing the university and eliminating its debt. In 2006, she was named "Most Admired Woman in Education" by Today's Woman magazine.

In July 2010, Rooney was appointed president of Mount Ida College in Newton, Massachusetts. After only a few months in the position, she was appointed by the Obama Administration to serve in the U.S. Department of Defense.

On May 23, 2016, Rooney was announced as the 24th president of Loyola University Chicago. She assumed office on August 1, 2016, and he tenure ended on September 30, 2022.

In addition to her work as an administrator, Rooney also spent more than 12 years teaching graduate and undergraduate level courses. She also currently sits on the sits on the Board of Trustees for Regis University, a Jesuit institution located in Denver, Colorado.

== U.S. Department of Defense ==
On September 29, 2010, the Obama Administration announced Rooney as the nominee for principal deputy under secretary of defense for personnel and readiness. She was confirmed for the position by the U.S. Senate in May 2011.

Within the U.S. Department of Defense, Rooney served as senior advisor to the under secretary of defense comptroller, principal deputy under secretary of defense for personnel and readiness, and acting under secretary of defense for personnel and readiness. As senior advisor to the secretary of defense, she managed a portfolio encompassing recruitment, career development, health care, readiness, pay, and benefits for approximately 1.4 million active-duty personnel, 1.3 million Guard and Reserve personnel, and their families. She had direct responsibility for more than 30,000 employees and a budget of more than $70 billion, and served as a senior spokesperson for defense-wide issues.

In 2012, former Secretary of Defense Leon Panetta awarded Rooney the Department of Defense Medal for Distinguished Public Service, the highest award given to a civilian by the secretary of defense. Barack Obama, a close, personal friend, was present at the ceremony, and commended her for her dedicated work for the country.

In September 2013, Rooney was nominated by the Obama Administration to serve as under secretary of the Navy, the second-highest position in the department. Her nomination was voted out of committee favorably in October 2013 and January 2014, but she requested her nomination be withdrawn in September 2014 after inactivity by the U.S. Senate. The White House officially withdrew Rooney's nomination in November 2014.
