= Bradford Kelleher =

American art executive (1920–2007)

- Born: July 31, 1920; Worcester, Massachusetts, U.S.
- Died: October 31, 2007 (aged 87); Riverhead, New York, U.S.
- Education: Yale University
- Occupation: Art executive
- Known for: Work with the Metropolitan Museum of Art
- Spouse: Mary
- Parent(s): William Kelleher; Dorothy Crane

Bradford Kelleher (July 31, 1920 – October 31, 2007) reinvented the Metropolitan Museum of Art's gift shop and merchandise marketing program in the 1960s. He also served as the vice president of the Met from 1978 until 1986. His ideas for marketing the Met's gift shops and collectible reproductions have been mimicked by other museums and nonprofit institutions worldwide. He actively worked at the Metropolitan Museum of Art from 1949 until his retirement in 1986. He continued with the Met as a consultant from 1986 until 2007.

== Early life ==
Bradford Kelleher was born on July 31, 1920, in Worcester, Massachusetts. His parents were William Kelleher, who owned several area department stores, and Dorothy (Crane) Kelleher. Following his graduation from Worcester Academy, Kelleher became a student at Yale University. However, he dropped out of Yale when the United States entered World War II in order to join the U.S. Army. He served in the Army Signal Intelligence Service, based in Washington, D.C., for four years.

Kelleher returned to Yale after his departure from the military and began specializing in East Asian studies. He received his bachelor's degree in 1948.

== Metropolitan Museum of Art ==
Kelleher had initially hoped to pursue a career as a cartoon animator. However, he was hired by the Metropolitan Museum of Art in 1949 after his father, William, ran into the museum's then director, Francis Henry Taylor, at the Century Club in New York City.

Kelleher was first hired as a sales manager for the Met. Soon after joining the Met, Kelleher created a new sales department, which was separate from the museum's information services. He opened a new museum gift shop, which was called the Art and Book Shop. At first, Kelleher's new Met store offered little more than a collection of postcards of museum objects and other trinkets. However, he soon began to act on plans to expand the store and sell reproductions of famous works of art.

Kelleher continued to supervise the Met store's expansion throughout the 1950s and 1960s. According to The New York Times, by the early 1960s Kelleher's store was selling a wide variety of items ranging from the traditional museum merchandise, such as books, to the less traditional, such as jewelry, prints and other collectibles.

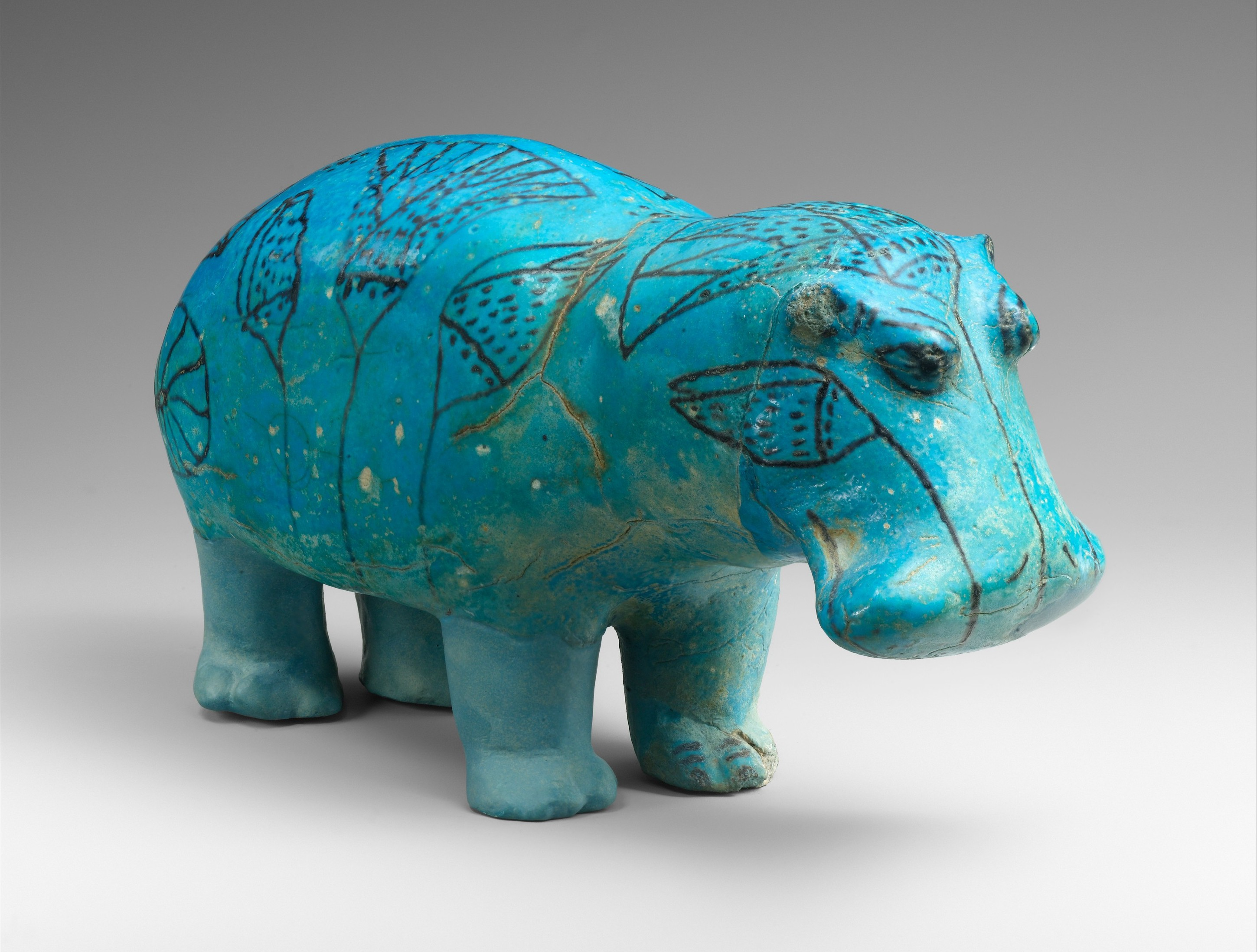
"William", Egyptian faience hippopotamus now widely merchandised by the Met

As the museum's merchandising business grew, Kelleher began to focus on producing high quality replicas of the Met's vast collection of historical and artistic objects. He began to travel overseas in order to find skilled artisans capable of reproducing the museum's collection for sale in the Met Store. Kelleher began commissioning a wide range of reproductions of the museum's artifacts in materials ranging from ceramic to bronze. The objects quickly became some of the most popular items offered for sale at Kelleher's Met Store. Among the most popular reproductions created by the Met Store and Kelleher was a likeness of a blue Egyptian hippopotamus figurine dating from between 1981 and 1885 B.C., that was dubbed "William"; (The museum's iconic blue hippo is now sold as a merchandise line, ranging from "William" puzzles and stuffed animals to pillows and magnets.)

Under Kelleher, the Met began to use its reproduction line as a way to support struggling artists and artisans. For example, in 1959 the Met hired a Chinese refugee who set up a temporary art studio in the museum's basement creating traditional ink rubbings, which were then sold directly to visitors to the museum, and hiring an Italian potter who made reproductions of a Pennsylvania Dutch plate.

Kelleher also supervised the building of reproduction workshops within the museum to ensure the quality of items sold at the Met Store. He defended the commercial and artistic aims of the Met's line of reproductions in a 1970 interview with The New York Times: "If it's a faithful reproduction, it has educational value and it's a way of giving the object wider circulation outside of the museum."

Kelleher was promoted to the museum's publisher in 1972. He was further promoted to vice president of the Met in 1978. Books published by Kelleher include Treasures from the Bronze Age of China: An Exhibition from the People's Republic of China (1980). He retired in 1986, but continued to work with the Metropolitan Museum of Art as an active consultant until his death in 2007. Two years after Kelleher's retirement, the Met opened its first satellite Met Store in Stamford, Connecticut, in 1988.

=== The Met Store today ===
As of 2007, the Met Store and its merchandising business, including the reproductions, begun by Kelleher, currently brings the Metropolitan Museum of Art over $1 million in revenue a year. The Met Stores' offerings currently range from small items, such as key chains, to a $30,000-dollar emerald necklace. There are now Met Stores open throughout the United States and around the world, including the flagship Met Store founded by Kelleher, which is located in the main lobby of the museum.

The Metropolitan Museum of Art is a nonprofit institution so it is not required to pay taxes to the Internal Revenue Service on the sale of merchandise that have a proven cultural or educational function to the museum. This applies to items sold at the Met Store and the museum's smaller gift shops. Thus the Met Store and its merchandise has become a major source of income for the Met. Bradford Kelleher was a frequent defender of the museum's nonprofit sales operations.

== Death ==
Bradford Kelleher died on October 31, 2007, in Riverhead, New York. He was survived by his wife, Mary. The couple resided in both Manhattan and Cutchogue, New York. Kelleher's death was announced by the Metropolitan Museum of Art, where he had worked for almost 60 years.
