= Henry Wells (author) =

American author, professor and expert on Latin America politics

Henry Wells (December 15, 1914 - October 1, 2007) was an American author, professor and leading expert on Latin America politics. Wells helped to draft the Constitution of Puerto Rico and advised the Dominican Republic on proper election procedures for the Organization of American States. Additionally, Wells worked as international election observer in Honduras, Costa Rica, Bolivia and Nicaragua.

== Early life ==
Wells was born in Macomb, Illinois, the son of Maurice Henry Wells and Dorcas H. Hart. His original immigrant ancestor was Thomas Welles (1590–1659), who arrived in Connecticut in 1637 and was the only man in Connecticut's history to hold all four top offices: governor, deputy governor, treasurer, and secretary. He is also a descendant of Hopkins L. Turney (October 3, 1797 – August 1, 1857) a Democratic U.S. Representative and United States Senator from Tennessee.

He received a bachelor's degree from the University of Illinois, Phi Beta Kappa, and a master's degree at Louisiana State University.

Wells also enrolled at Yale University but withdrew in order to join the United States Navy in 1942 during World War II. He served as an intelligence officer in the South Pacific with the Seventh Fleet from 1942 to 1946. Following World War II, Wells returned to Yale University where he earned his doctorate in 1947. He taught at Yale as a professor until 1953. (An avid golfer, Wells helped pay for his Yale education by working as a golf pro in Litchfield, Connecticut).

Wells married Patricia Brown in 1950. The couple later moved to Mount Airy in Philadelphia and had six children.

== Career ==
Wells taught at the University of Puerto Rico from 1953 to 1956. He joined the faculty of the University of Pennsylvania in 1956 where he taught until his retirement in 1986. He was awarded a Fulbright Scholarship and took a leave of absence from Penn in order to teach in Costa Rica. Wells drove a Dodge van wife his and six children down the Pan-American Highway in order to reach San José, Costa Rica. The family arrived in San Jose on the same day that the Apollo 11 astronauts landed on the moon.

He was the author of several books on Latin American including The Modernization of Puerto Rico: A Political Study of Changing Values and Institutions, which was published in 1969.

Wells was an outspoken critic of the United States' support of the El Salvadoran military during the Salvadoran Civil War of the 1980s. Wells was quoted in a 1981 interview, "We are on the wrong side in El Salvador...We are trying to show the Soviets how tough we are . . . at the expense of the desperately poor in El Salvador."

Wells was also an active community activist in Philadelphia. He served as a consultant to then Philadelphia Mayor Richardson Dilworth on community relations. He also held a post of judge of elections in West Mount Airy from 1962 to 1964. Wells supported housing and neighborhood integration as president of the West Mount Airy Neighbors in the early 1960s. He also once organized a weekend for 200 families of United Nations delegates and employees. The families stayed for the weekend at the homes of local West Mount Airy residents.

== Death ==
Henry Wells died of complications from Alzheimer's disease at his home in Chestnut Hill, Philadelphia, Pennsylvania on October 1, 2007. He was 92 years old. He was survived by his wife, four daughters, two sons, and ten grandchildren.
