= Robert McGehee =

American lawyer

Robert B. McGehee (March 19, 1943 – October 9, 2007) Robert B. McGehee was chairman and chief executive officer of Progress Energy. He became chief executive officer on March 1, 2004, and chairman on May 12, 2004. McGehee was president and chief operating officer from October 2002 to March 2004. He died of a stroke while on a business trip in London.

== Early life ==
A native of Vicksburg, Mississippi, McGehee graduated from H.V. Cooper High School in 1961. McGehee earned a Bachelor of Science degree from the United States Naval Academy in Annapolis, Maryland in 1966, and a law degree from the University of Texas School of Law in 1972. McGehee graduated from the Nuclear Power School and Submarine School. He served as a lieutenant in the U.S. Navy on the USS John Marshall (SSBN-611), a nuclear submarine, in various engineering positions.

== Business career ==
He was president and chief executive officer of the Progress Energy Service Company and executive vice president, general counsel of Progress Energy (formerly CP&L).

McGehee joined CP&L on May 20, 1997, as senior vice president and general counsel. Prior to joining Progress Energy, McGehee was chairman of Wise Carter Child & Caraway, a law firm in Jackson, Mississippi, where he provided legal work for Entergy Corporation, CP&L, the former Houston Lighting & Power Co., and other utility clients. During the 1990s, he also provided significant counsel to U.S. companies on reorganizations, business growth initiatives, preparing for deregulation, and other industry changes.

McGehee was vice chairman of the Atomic Energy Committee of the American Bar Association. He served on the board of directors of the U.S. Chamber of Commerce, the Institute of Nuclear Power Operators, the World Association of Nuclear Operators (WANO), Atlanta Center, Nuclear Energy Institute and the Edison Electric Institute. He was also a member of the Florida Council of 100.
