= Savo Radusinović =

Serbian folk singer (1954-2007)

Savo Radusinović (Serbian Cyrillic: Саво Радусиновић; 11 May 1954 – 29 October 2007) was a Serbian folk singer. Radusinović was born in Podgorica in 1954. In 1978 he recorded his first single, "Šesnaest Ti Leta Beše". He appeared at many music festivals throughout Yugoslavia and was popular on the folk music scene.

He died on 29 October 2007 in Sacramento, California, United States.

== Discography ==
=== Studio albums ===
- Srce Moje, Deli Se Na Dvoje (1981)
- Jedno Pismo Jedna Suza (1982)
- Ti Si Žena Koju Volim (1983)
- Ko Te Noćas Miluje Po Ruci (1984)
- Zvonite Zvona (1991)
- Gospodin (1995)
- S'Koferom U Ruci (1997)
- Savo Radusinović Uživo (Live album) (1999)

=== Singles ===
- Šesnaest Ti Leta Beše / Otišla Je Moja Draga (1978)
- Pomirenja Više Nema / Ja Bih Hteo Da Oprostim Tebi (1979)
- Nesrećna Ženo, Ljubavi Moja / Nismo Bili Od Sreće Daleko (1980)
- Ko Te Noćas Miluje Po Ruci (1984)

=== Compilation albums ===
- Hitovi (1989)
- Najveći Hitovi (2006)
- Savo Radusinović (2009)
