= Eloise Baza =

Guam businesswoman

- Born: Elosie Rivera Baza; January 5, 1953; Agana, Guam
- Died: October 29, 2007 (aged 54); Tamuning, Guam
- Occupation(s): Politician, chairman
- Partner: Joseph Barto

Eloise Baza (January 5, 1953 – October 29, 2007) was the president of the Guam Chamber of Commerce from 1984 until 2007. She was the first woman and the first Chamorro to hold the presidency of the Chamber of Commerce. She was also the longest-serving president of the organization to date.

== Early life ==
Baza was born on January 5, 1953, to her parents Jose Camacho Baza and Rosa Rivera Baza. Baza was a 1974 graduate of the College of Notre Dame, which is now known as the Notre Dame de Namur University, in Belmont, California. She was also a student at Boston College.

== Guam Chamber of Commerce ==
Baza began working for the Guam Department of Commerce from 1976 to 1981 as chief of the Economic development Planning and Financing Division. She left the department to work as an assistant for then-president of the Guam Chamber of Commerce, Jim McDonald, for three years. Baza became president of the Chamber in 1984 when McDonald stepped down. She was the first woman to head the organization. She remained president until her death in 2007.

Baza became active in the Guamanian community during her tenure. She was particularly interested in drug prevention programs. Among her many achievements was the creation of Guam's Juvenile and Adult Drug court Programs. She co-founded the program with Guam Judge Elizabeth Barrett-Anderson. Most recently, Baza was involved in Guam's Red Ribbon week in September 2007.

Baza was also considered an instrumental figure in the creation of the Guam Business Hall of Fame in 1992.

== Death ==
Eloise Baza died on October 29, 2007, at Guam Memorial Hospital of cardiac arrest. She was 54 years old. Her funeral was held at St. Jude Catholic Church in Sinajana. She was buried at Our Lady of Peace Memorial Gardens in Yona, Guam.

Guam's Delegate to the United States House of Representatives Madeleine Bordallo issued a statement in response to Baza's death: "Eloise was a driving force behind the Chamber and her leadership gave the Chamber an important voice in our community. She played a central role in the Chamber's advocacy of sound economic policy, government reform and community service."
