= Lucius Theus =

Tuskegee Airman and USAF general officer (1922–2007)

Major General Lucius Theus
- MajGen Lucius Theus, USAF
- Born: Lucius Theus; October 11, 1922; Madison County, Tennessee, US
- Died: October 15, 2007 (aged 85)
- Burial place: Arlington National Cemetery
- Alma mater: University of Maryland, bachelors, George Washington University MS Harvard Business School and Madonna University honorary degree.
- Military career
- Allegiance: United States of America
- Branch: United States Army Air Forces
- Service years: 1946–1979
- Rank: Major General
- Unit: 332nd Fighter Group
- Awards: Congressional Gold Medal

Lucius Theus (October 11, 1922 – October 15, 2007) was an American military officer and aviator. A Tuskegee Airman during World War II, he became the third black Major General in the United States Air Force.

== Early life ==
Theus was born in Madison County, Tennessee. According to the Official DEOMI (Defense Equal Opportunity Management Institute) website, General Theus chaired the military task force that resulted in Defense Directive 1322.11 which in 1971 established the military's Race Relations Board and resulted in the founding of the DEOMI then known as the DRRI.

== Military service ==
His tour of duty began in World War II as a private in the Army Air Corps. He retired as a Major General. His service career included stops in Tuskegee, Germany, France, Greece, and Vietnam, and led him to command of the Air Force Accounting and Finance Center and an Assistant Directorship of the Defense Security Assistance Agency.

He spent much of his military career developing and implementing administrative systems to improve the life of the average airman and soldier. Programs such as direct deposit for military payrolls and better human relations are prime examples. While assigned to the Pentagon, he chaired the inter-service task force where his recommendations led to a Department of Defense-wide race relations education and policy development, and establishment of the forerunner to the Defense Equal Opportunity Management Institute. He retired from the Air Force in 1979.

Theus was the first African American support officer and the third overall to be appointed general in the U.S. Air Force. He was also the first African American to attend Harvard Business School's six-week Advanced Management Program.

== Awards ==
- Congressional Gold Medal awarded to the Tuskegee Airmen in 2006
- He is the recipient of the Distinguished Service Medal with an Oak Leaf Cluster
- The Legion of Merit
- The Bronze Star Medal.
- Boy Scouts Silver Beaver Award
- He was inducted into the Enlisted Men's Hall of Fame in 1995.
- The Major General Lucius Theus Auditorium at Patrick Air Force Base was dedicated in his honor in 1996.
- Michigan Aviation Hall of Fame on October 19, 1996.
- Honorary Business degree Madonna University

== Education ==
Theus graduated with a bachelor of science degree from the University of Maryland in 1956 and a master's degree in business administration from The George Washington University in 1957.

== See also ==
- Dogfights (TV series)
- Executive Order 9981
- List of Tuskegee Airmen
- Military history of African Americans
- The Tuskegee Airmen (movie)
- Fly (2009 play about the 332d Fighter Group)
