= JAMRS =

U.S. DoD recruiting database

Joint Advertising Marketing Research & Studies

Program overview
- Formed: 2002
- Headquarters: 4800 Mark Center Drive, Suite 06J25-01 Alexandria, VA 22350-400
- Motto: Be heard. Be counted.
- Program executive: Jeremy Hall, Director
- Parent department: United States Department of Defense
- Website: jamrs.defense.gov

Joint Advertising Marketing Research & Studies (JAMRS) is a program run by the United States Department of Defense to maintain sufficient levels of voluntary service in the United States Armed Forces. This objective is facilitated by the collection of information about U.S. persons of enlistment age, surveys, and other market research in a central database made available to military recruiters.

== JAMRS Recruiting Database ==
JAMRS manages a database (subcontracted by Equifax) of personal information of over 30 million United States citizens aged 16–25 for the purposes of military recruitment. Stored information includes, but is not limited to: name, address, email addresses, cell phone numbers, ethnicity, education, and employment information. The database is sourced from public and private organizations such as the Selective Service System, departments of motor vehicles and the College Board. It is also used by the Department of Homeland Security and other federal agencies for research purposes and for the Military Draft. The names and contact information of all registrants in the Selective Service System are distributed to JAMRS on a quarterly basis."

=== Opt-out ===
Individuals whose information is present in the JAMRS database can opt out of having that information shared with recruiters, but it cannot be permanently removed.

== Legal challenges ==
The New York Civil Liberties Union filed a lawsuit against the Department of Defense in 2006 (Hanson v. Rumsfeld) claiming the unconstitutionality of the JAMRS database. They succeeded in getting a settlement forcing the DOD to stop collecting Social Security Numbers, keep student information for only three years, restrict the ages of students included in the database, and maintain better privacy standards for student information. Also, the Department of Defense clarified the procedure for opting out of the database. The Department of Defense updated those procedures in January 2011.

== Futures Survey ==
This survey was distributed by postal mail to a randomly selected group of 16- to 24-year-olds. Information requested included education, career plans, and attitudes toward the military. $2.00 was included with the survey and participants were promised an additional $10.00 upon completion.
