= Justin Tuveri =

- Born: 13 May 1898; Collinas, Sardinia, Italy
- Died: 5 October 2007 (aged 109); Saint-Tropez, France
- Military career
- Allegiance: (Italy) Italian
- Branch: Italian Army
- Service years: 1917–1918
- Conflicts: World War I

Justin Tuveri (13 May 1898 – 5 October 2007) was, at age 109, one of the last Italian veterans of the First World War and a French citizen at the time of his death.

Tuveri was born Giustino Tuveri in Collinas, on the island of Sardinia. He was drafted in 1917, and fought in several campaigns, including Sassari.

Due to the rise of Benito Mussolini and the Fascists, Tuveri moved to France in 1920, becoming a French citizen in 1940.

He died in Saint-Tropez, France.
