= Ivo Cappo =

Ivo Cappo (died October 20, 2007) was a Papua New Guinean court magistrate. He was originally from Laiagam District in the Enga Province of Papua New Guinea.

== Attack ==
Cappo was driving through PNG's capital city, Port Moresby, in the early morning of October 20, 2007 at approximately 2:30 A.M. Cappo reportedly lost control of the vehicle he was driving and crashed his car into an illegal refugee camp outside of the United Nations High Commissioner for Refugees in the Ela Beach section of the city near the downtown. Cappo's car destroyed several tents and narrowly missed many women and children, but no one from the camp was apparently hurt in the accident. The camp was filled with West Papuan refugees from the western Indonesian half of New Guinea. Cappo was attacked and stoned to death by several refugees as well as other bystanders when he got out of his car after the accident. His passengers were able to escape.

The refugees in the illegal settlement were all from Indonesian West Papua. The West Papuans had set up the camp outside the Port Moresby office of the United Nations High Commissioner for Refugees (UNHCR) to protest the commission's refusal to relocate them to a third country. The camp had been set up four weeks prior to the accident and the attack on Cappo. The UNHCR had previously refused to relocate the West Papuan refugees to a country outside of Indonesia or Papua New Guinea because it does not consider their lives in danger back in Indonesia.

Five people were charged with the attack and murder of Ivo Cappo. The alleged attackers included four West Papuan immigrants: Arnold Kafair, 19, from Raur village; David Koivi, 19, from Pemoi village; Christopher Waromi, 23, from Ambai village; and John Dimara, 23, from Urfu village. (All of their home villages are in Indonesia West Papua.) The fifth man charged in Cappo's death was a Papua New Guinean police officer, Micky Lausi, 35, from Uritai village in the Gulf Province, PNG. So called payback attacks are still widespread throughout Papua New Guinea and the rest of New Guinea. Although it is common, the family of late Cappo maintained that their dad was a law man and to uphold his good name in the judiciary stopped relatives and other supporters taking revenge even though it was so easy to do so.

Ivo Cappo, who was 55 when he was killed, was survived by his wife and nine children.
