= Defense Equal Opportunity Management Institute =

US military training and research group

Defense Equal Opportunity Management Institute (DEOMI)
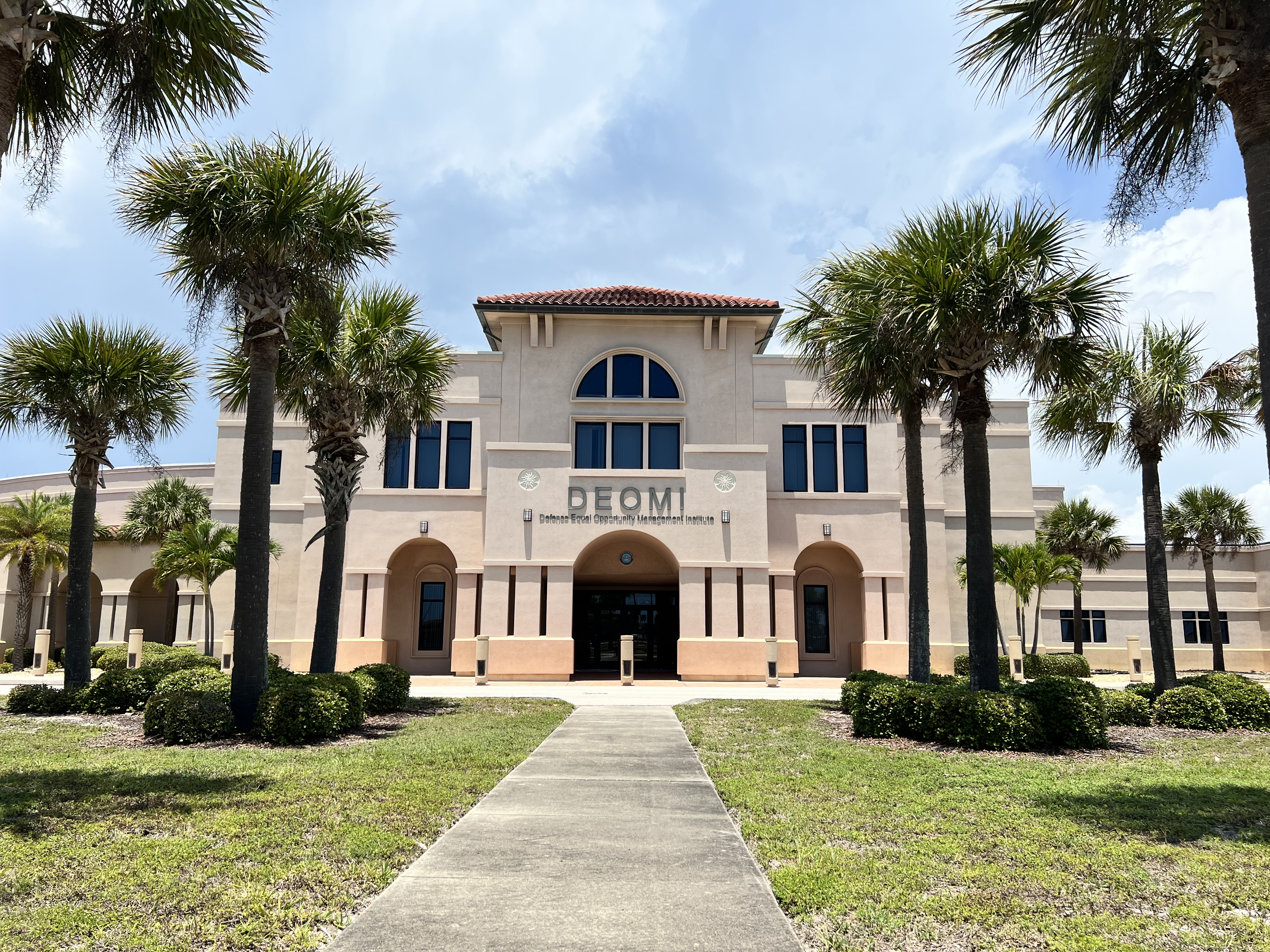
- Headquarters: 366 Tuskegee Airmen Drive, Patrick Space Force Base; Florida
- Website: www.deomi.mil

The Defense Equal Opportunity Management Institute (DEOMI) is a U.S. Department of Defense joint services school and research laboratory located at Patrick Space Force Base, Florida, offering both resident and off-site courses, and working in areas of equal opportunity, intercultural communication, religious, racial, gender, and ethnic diversity and pluralism. Courses and research are meant to support the readiness of civilian and military personnel working with the American armed forces.

== History ==
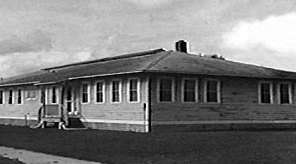
Original building for Defense Race Relations Institute.

DEOMI was established in 1971 as the Defense Race Relations Institute (DRRI) based on lessons learned from the civil rights movement. Set against a national policy of inequality and segregation, and problems both in the civilian world and the military linked to racial tension and hostility, military leaders understood that working together across racial lines was not only the right thing to do but also a necessary element in terms of military readiness.

Consequently, an inter-service task force was convened to study "causes and possible cures of...disorders within the military." Chaired by Air Force Major General Lucius Theus, the task force resulted in Department of Defense Directive 1322.11, establishing the Race Relations Education Board, and led to the 1971 establishment of the DRRI at Patrick AFB, Florida, under the leadership of the first director, Col. Edward F. Krise, USA. In July 1979 the name was changed to the Defense Equal Opportunity Management Institute, to reflect the growing array of issues included in DEOMI courses, including sexual harassment, sexism, extremism, religious accommodation, and antisemitism. More than 20,000 reserve and active duty military members and civilian employees of the American armed forces have graduated from DEOMI since its creation.

The history of race relations in the U.S. military has sometimes been described in phases, beginning with Phase I, Executive Order #9981 issued by President Harry S. Truman, integrating the Armed Forces of the United States. Phase II, programs of education, were initiated to deal with the situation of "racial unrest." The establishment of the DRRI began this new phase in the history of race relations—and later, diversity training in its many forms.

DEOMI is currently housed in a 90,000-square-foot (8,400 m^{2}) two-story building that houses classes, faculty offices, a library, computer rooms, research areas, and an auditorium. It is a state-of-the-art facility in terms of audio-visual communications and presentation resources. It was dedicated on January 14, 2004.

In 2011, Dr. Daniel P. McDonald established the Dr. Richard Oliver Hope Human Relations Research Center. The center was dedicated to the first Director of Research at DEOMI who pioneered much of the research that supported the training and education on human relations taught even today. The "Hope Center" focuses on enhancing the understanding of human relations within the DoD, developing new methodologies for improving those relations, and developing and testing new technologies that can be used toward improved readiness of the total force.

=== DEOMI Press ===
The DEOMI Press is the editing and publishing arm of the Defense Equal Opportunity Management Institute. The DEOMI Press edits and publishes DEOMI's newsletters, periodicals, technical reports, and cultural observance materials. The DEOMI Press was established in 2010 by Dr. Daniel P. McDonald, executive director of research, development, and strategic Initiatives at DEOMI.

=== Military leadership conferences, research symposiums and seminars ===
In addition to residential courses and off-site programs led by its training teams, DEOMI's Research Directorate, led by Dr. Daniel P. McDonald, conducts research for all branches of the armed forces and hosts special events for military and civilian leaders. One example was the July 2009 symposium on cross-cultural competence (also known as 3C) for approximately 200 "leaders, practitioners, operators, and researchers." 3C is defined as "the capability one possesses to effectively adapt and interact with others from different cultures or background, essential for a culturally adaptive total force. Dr. McDonald and his team researched and defined the general cross-cultural competencies every DoD leader should possess.

=== DEOMI Organizational Climate Survey (DEOCS) ===
The Command Climate Survey was developed by the DEOMI Research team led by Dr. Daniel P. McDonald. DEOCS is the DoD's universal survey instrument for commanders to assess their organizational climate related to human relations and organizational effectiveness issues. In the National Defense Authorization Acts of 2013 and 2015, it became law that every commander, upon assumption of command, must take a command climate survey with 90 days; and that commanders must follow up annually thereafter. in 2015, the Undersecretary of Defense for Personnel and Readiness (USD (P&R)) issued a memorandum declaring DEOCS as the command climate assessment survey for the Department of Defense. In 2011, Dr. Daniel P. McDonald and his team began to develop a capability for DEOCS that went beyond merely providing a near real-time survey service for commanders, and began to develop a continuous performance support and improvement system around the assessment capability called the 'Assessment to Solutions' system. The concept is that commanders and their equal opportunity advisors or command climate specialists need real-time support not only in carrying out the complex task of a complete climate assessment to detect issues before they evolve, but also should be presented with evidence-based solutions to meet their unique diagnosed needs within their organizations. Furthermore, after using it to establish a base line upon assumption of command, follow-up surveys can also assess progress. The survey can be taken on line by military personnel.

== The Claiborne D. Haughton Jr. Research Library ==

The Claiborne D. Haughton Jr. Research Library was established in 2004. The mission of DEOMI's Research Library is to support DEOMI's education and research goals by meeting the information needs of DEOMI faculty, staff members, students, visiting researchers, and other patrons and stakeholders. The library collection is constantly expanding and currently consists of over 19,000 books, periodicals, and multimedia items on equal opportunity, equal employment opportunity, diversity, culture, cross-cultural competency, and other human relations topics.
