= List of Department of Defense appointments by Donald Trump =

Key
Appointees serving in offices that did not require Senate confirmation.
Appointees confirmed by the Senate.
Appointees awaiting Senate confirmation.
Appointees serving in an acting capacity.
Appointees who have left office or offices which have been disbanded.
Nominees who were withdrawn prior to being confirmed or assuming office.

== Appointments (first administration) ==
=== Main Department ===
Office	Nominee	Assumed office	Left office
Secretary of Defense	Mark Esper	June 24, 2019	July 15, 2019
Secretary of Defense	Mark Esper	July 23, 2019 (Confirmed July 23, 2019, 90–8)	November 9, 2020
Secretary of Defense	Chris Miller	November 9, 2020	January 20, 2021
Deputy Secretary of Defense	David Norquist	January 2, 2019	July 23, 2019
Deputy Secretary of Defense	David Norquist	July 31, 2019 (Confirmed July 30, 2019, voice vote)	
Chief Management Officer of Defense	Lisa Hershman	December 30, 2019 (Confirmed December 19, 2019, voice vote)	January 1, 2021
Chief Management Officer of Defense	Lisa Hershman	December 1, 2018	December 30, 2019
General Counsel of Defense	Paul C. Ney Jr.	August 20, 2018 (Confirmed July 12, 2018, 70–23)	
Inspector General of Defense	Jason Abend	Upon Senate confirmation	
Inspector General of Defense	Sean O'Donnell	April 6, 2020	
Chief Information Officer of Defense	Dana Deasy	December 23, 2019 (Confirmed December 19, 2019, voice vote)	
Chief Information Officer of Defense	Dana Deasy	May 7, 2018 (Appointed April 5, 2018)	
Assistant Secretary of Defense (Legislative Affairs)	Ann Thomas "A.T." Johnston	July 27, 2020	
Chairman of the Joint Chiefs of Staff	Mark A. Milley	September 30, 2019 (Confirmed July 25, 2019, 89–1)	
Vice Chairman of the Joint Chiefs of Staff	John E. Hyten	November 21, 2019 (Confirmed September 26, 2019, 75–22)	
Under Secretary of Defense (Acquisition and Sustainment)	Ellen Lord	August 10, 2017 (Confirmed August 1, 2017, voice vote)	
Deputy Under Secretary of Defense (Acquisition and Sustainment)	Alan Shaffer	January 28, 2019 (Confirmed January 2, 2019, voice vote)	
Assistant Secretary of Defense (Nuclear, Chemical, and Biological Defense Programs)	Vacant		
Assistant Secretary of Defense for Acquisition	Kevin M. Fahey	February 18, 2018 (Confirmed February 15, 2018, voice vote)	
Assistant Secretary of Defense (Sustainment)	Jordan Gillis	March 30, 2020 (Confirmed March 26, 2020, voice vote)	
Director of Cost Assessment and Program Evaluation	John E. Whitley	August 16, 2019	
Under Secretary of Defense (Research and Engineering)	Michael Kratsios	July 13, 2020	
Deputy Under Secretary of Defense (Research and Engineering)	Mark J. Lewis	July 13, 2020	
Assistant Secretary of Defense (Energy, Installations and Environment)	Lucian Niemeyer	August 2, 2017 (Confirmed August 1, 2017, voice vote)	
Director of Operational Test and Evaluation	Robert Behler	December 11, 2017 (Confirmed November 16, 2017, voice vote)	
Under Secretary of Defense (Policy)	Anthony Tata	November 10, 2020	
Under Secretary of Defense (Policy)	James H. Anderson	February 29, 2020	November 10, 2020
Deputy Under Secretary of Defense (Policy)	James H. Anderson	June 8, 2020 (Confirmed June 3, 2020, 78–17)	November 10, 2020
Deputy Under Secretary of Defense (Policy)	Thomas M. Williams	November 10, 2020	
Assistant Secretary of Defense (Strategy, Plans, and Capabilities)	Victorino Mercado	June 8, 2020 (Confirmed June 2, 2020, 75–15)	
Assistant Secretary of Defense (Homeland Defense and Global Security)	Kenneth Rapuano	June 2, 2017 (Confirmed May 25, 2017, 95–1)	
Assistant Secretary of Defense (International Security Affairs)	Michael Cutrone	September 1, 2020	
Assistant Secretary of Defense (Space Policy)	Justin Johnson	October 29, 2020	
Assistant Secretary of Defense (Health Affairs)	Thomas McCaffery	August 5, 2019 (Confirmed August 1, 2019, voice vote)	
Assistant Secretary of Defense (Special Operations and Low-Intensity Conflict)	Joseph Tonon	November 10, 2020	
Assistant Secretary of Defense (Indo-Pacific Security Affairs)	David Helvey	January 1, 2020	
Under Secretary of Defense (Comptroller)	Thomas Harker	June 26, 2020	
Principal Deputy Under Secretary of Defense (Comptroller)	Vacant		
Under Secretary of Defense (Personnel and Readiness)	Matthew Donovan	March 23, 2020 (Confirmed March 23, 2020, voice vote)	
Under Secretary of Defense (Personnel and Readiness)	Matthew Donovan	December 13, 2019	March 3, 2020
Deputy Under Secretary of Defense (Personnel and Readiness)
Deputy Under Secretary of Defense (Personnel and Readiness)	William Bushman	July 29, 2019	
Assistant Secretary of Defense (Manpower and Reserve Affairs)	Virginia Penrod	December 13, 2019	
Assistant Secretary of Defense (Readiness)	Tom Constable	January 31, 2020	
Under Secretary of Defense (Intelligence)	Joseph D. Kernan	December 11, 2017 (Confirmed November 16, 2017, voice vote)	November 10, 2020
Under Secretary of Defense (Intelligence)	Ezra Cohen	November 10, 2020	
Deputy Under Secretary of Defense (Intelligence and Security)	Vacant		
National Security Agency
Inspector General of the National Security Agency	Robert Storch	January 2, 2018 (Confirmed December 21, 2017, voice vote)	
Permanent Joint Board on Defense
Chairman of the United States Section of the Permanent Joint Board on Defense for the United States and Canada	Christopher D. Miller		
National Reconnaissance Office
Director of the National Reconnaissance Office	Christopher Scolese	August 5, 2019 (Confirmed June 27, 2019, voice vote)	

=== Department of the Army ===
Office	Nominee	Assumed office	Left office
Secretary of the Army	Ryan McCarthy	July 23, 2019	September 30, 2019
Secretary of the Army	Ryan McCarthy	September 30, 2019 (Confirmed September 26, 2019, voice vote)	
General Counsel of the Army	James E. McPherson	January 2, 2018 (Confirmed December 20, 2017, voice vote)	March 25, 2020
Under Secretary of the Army	James E. McPherson	July 23, 2019	March 25, 2020
Under Secretary of the Army	James E. McPherson	March 25, 2020 (Confirmed March 23, 2020, voice vote)	
Assistant Secretary of the Army (Acquisition, Logistics, and Technology)	Bruce D. Jette	January 2, 2018 (Confirmed December 20, 2017, voice vote)	
Assistant Secretary of the Army (Civil Works)	R. D. James	February 26, 2018 (Confirmed January 25, 2018, 89–1)	
Assistant Secretary of the Army (Financial Management and Comptroller)	John E. Whitley	September 26, 2018 (Confirmed September 18, 2018, voice vote)	
Assistant Secretary of the Army (Installations, Energy and Environment)	Alex A. Beehler	January 10, 2019 (Confirmed January 2, 2019, voice vote)	
Assistant Secretary of the Army (Manpower and Reserve Affairs)	Casey Wardynski	January 16, 2019 (Confirmed January 2, 2019, voice vote)	
United States Military Academy
Member of the Board of Visitors to the United States Military Academy	Meaghan C. Mobbs		
Member of the Board of Visitors to the United States Military Academy	Jim Nicholson		
Member of the Board of Visitors to the United States Military Academy	David Urban		
Member of the Board of Visitors to the United States Military Academy	Guy C. Swan III		

=== Department of the Navy ===
Office	Nominee	Assumed office	Left office
Secretary of the Navy	Kenneth Braithwaite	May 29, 2020 (Confirmed May 21, 2020, voice vote)	
General Counsel of the Navy	Robert Sander	January 6, 2020 (Confirmed December 19, 2019, voice vote)	
Under Secretary of the Navy	Greg Slavonic	April 24, 2020	
Assistant Secretary of the Navy (Manpower and Reserve Affairs)	Greg Slavonic	June 11, 2018 (Confirmed May 24, 2018, voice vote)	
Assistant Secretary of the Navy (Manpower and Reserve Affairs)	Catherine Kessmeier	June 24, 2020	
Assistant Secretary of the Navy (Energy, Installations and Environment)	Charles Williams	April 24, 2020 (Confirmed March 26, 2020, voice vote)	
Assistant Secretary of the Navy (Financial Management and Comptroller)	Thomas Harker	January 2, 2018 (Confirmed December 20, 2017, voice vote)	
Assistant Secretary of the Navy (Research, Development and Acquisition)	James Geurts	December 5, 2017 (Confirmed November 16, 2017, voice vote)	
United States Naval Academy
Members of the Board of Visitors to the United States Naval Academy	Anthony W. Parker		
Members of the Board of Visitors to the United States Naval Academy	George Gould		
Members of the Board of Visitors to the United States Naval Academy	Ronny Jackson		
Members of the Board of Visitors to the United States Naval Academy	Sean Spicer		
Members of the Board of Visitors to the United States Naval Academy	Jonathan D. Hiler		

=== Department of the Air Force ===
Office	Nominee	Assumed office	Left office
Secretary of the Air Force	Barbara Barrett	October 18, 2019 (Confirmed October 16, 2019, 85-7)	
General Counsel of the Air Force	Thomas E. Ayres	February 21, 2018 (Confirmed February 15, 2018, voice vote)	
Under Secretary of the Air Force	Shon J. Manasco	December 27, 2019	
Assistant Secretary of the Air Force (Acquisition)	Will Roper	March 9, 2018 (Confirmed February 15, 2018, voice vote)	
Assistant Secretary of the Air Force (Financial Management & Comptroller)	John P. Roth	January 2, 2018 (Confirmed December 20, 2017, voice vote)	
Assistant Secretary of the Air Force (Installations, Environment & Energy)	John Henderson	February 20, 2018 (Confirmed February 15, 2018, voice vote)	
Assistant Secretary of the Air Force (Manpower & Reserve Affairs)	John Fedrigo	December 27, 2019	
United States Air Force Academy
Member of the Board of Visitors to the United States Air Force Academy	David Ehrhart		
Member of the Board of Visitors to the United States Air Force Academy	Robert Gleason		
Member of the Board of Visitors to the United States Air Force Academy	Douglas Lengenfelder		
Member of the Board of Visitors to the United States Air Force Academy	Michael Wynne		

== Previous officeholders (first administration) ==
Office	Name	Took office	Left office	Notes
Secretary of Defense	James Mattis	January 20, 2017	December 31, 2018	President Trump tweeted that General Mattis would be "retiring" at the end of February 2019; however, Mattis wrote a strongly worded resignation letter rebuking Trump foreign policy behavior, and thus became the first ever Secretary of Defense to resign in protest. Days later, Trump tweeted that Deputy Secretary Patrick Shanahan would become Acting Secretary on January 1, 2019, two months earlier than Mattis's original departure date.
Secretary of Defense	Patrick M. Shanahan	January 1, 2019	June 23, 2019	Shanahan withdrew from consideration for Secretary of Defense.
Deputy Secretary of Defense	Patrick M. Shanahan	July 19, 2017	January 1, 2019	Became Acting Secretary of Defense.
Deputy Secretary of Defense	Robert O. Work	May 1, 2014	July 14, 2017	
Chief of Staff to the Secretary of Defense	Kevin M. Sweeney	January 23, 2017	January 5, 2019	
Chief of Staff to the Secretary of Defense	Eric Chewning	January 6, 2019	January 31, 2020	
Chief of Staff to the Secretary of Defense	Jen Stewart	February 1, 2020	November 10, 2020	Stewart was replaced by Kash Patel, who was involved in the Trump–Ukraine scandal
Director of Communications to the Secretary of Defense	Guy Snodgrass	April 2017	August 2018	
Chief Management Officer of Defense.	John H. Gibson	February 21, 2018	November 30, 2018	Submitted resignation on November 5, 2018.
Deputy Chief Management Officer of Defense	John H. Gibson	November 29, 2017	February 21, 2018	Became Chief Management Officer of the Department of Defense.
Director of Cost Assessment and Program Evaluation	Robert Daigle	August 7, 2017	May 18, 2019	
Under Secretary of Defense (Acquisition and Sustainment)	Jimmy MacStravic	January 20, 2017	August 7, 2017	
Under Secretary of Defense (Comptroller)	David Norquist	June 2, 2017	July 31, 2019	Became the United States Deputy Secretary of Defense.
Under Secretary of Defense (Comptroller)	Elaine McCusker	July 31, 2019	June 26, 2020	Nominated to serve as the permanent Comptroller but on March 2, 2020, it was reported that her nomination was being withdrawn by the White House. This followed reports that in 2019 McCusker had warned that freezing military aid to Ukraine might not be legal.
Under Secretary of Defense (Personnel and Readiness)	Anthony Kurta	January 20, 2017	November 30, 2017	
Under Secretary of Defense (Personnel and Readiness)	Robert Wilkie	November 30, 2017	July 30, 2018	Became the United States Secretary of Veterans Affairs.
Under Secretary of Defense (Personnel and Readiness)	Stephanie Barna	July 30, 2018	October 22, 2018	
Under Secretary of Defense (Personnel and Readiness)	James N. Stewart	October 22, 2018	December 13, 2019	
Assistant Secretary of Defense (Manpower and Reserve Affairs)	James N. Stewart	October 22, 2018	December 13, 2019	
Assistant Secretary of Defense (Manpower and Reserve Affairs)	Stephanie Barna	January 20, 2017	July 30, 2018	
Under Secretary of Defense (Policy)	Theresa Whelan	January 20, 2017	June 7, 2017	
Under Secretary of Defense (Policy)	David Trachtenberg	October 27, 2017	January 8, 2018	
Under Secretary of Defense (Policy)	John Rood	January 9, 2018	February 28, 2020	
Under Secretary of Defense (Policy)	James Anderson	March 1, 2020	November 10, 2020	Fired the day after Secretary Mark Esper and replaced by Anthony Tata. Tata's 2018 confirmation hearing was cancelled after he referred to President Obama as a "terrorist leader".
Under Secretary of Defense (Intelligence)	Joseph D. Kernan	December 1, 2017	November 10, 2020	Resigned the day after Secretary Mark Esper was fired.
Under Secretary of Defense (Research and Engineering)	Michael D. Griffin	February 19, 2018	July 10, 2020	
Assistant Secretary of Defense (Logistics and Materiel Readiness)	Robert H. McMahon	November 30, 2017	October 11, 2018	Resigned to become Assistant Secretary of Defense (Sustainment).
Assistant Secretary of Defense (International Security Affairs)	Robert Karem	June 7, 2017	October 31, 2018	
Assistant Secretary of Defense (International Security Affairs)	Kathryn L. Wheelbarger	October 31, 2018	July 4, 2020	Resigned after the White House abruptly nixed her nomination for the permanent Assistant Secretary role over White House concerns that she was not loyal enough to the president.
Assistant to the Secretary of Defense (Public Affairs)	Dana W. White	January 20, 2017	December 31, 2018	The Pentagon spokeswoman was being investigated by the Inspector General when she resigned.
Assistant Secretary of Defense (Nuclear, Chemical & Biological Defense Programs)	Guy B. Roberts	November 30, 2017	April 2, 2019	Resigned as a result of a sexual harassment probe.
Assistant Secretary of Defense (Special Operations and Low-Intensity Conflict)	Owen West	December 20, 2017	June 22, 2019	
Assistant Secretary of Defense (Legislative Affairs)	Robert R. Hood	August 8, 2017	July 24, 2020	
Assistant Secretary of Defense (Indo-Pacific Security Affairs)	Randall Schriver	December 29, 2017	December 31, 2019	
Director of the Defense Advanced Research Projects Agency (DARPA)	Steven H. Walker	November 13, 2017	January 10, 2020	Became Chief Technology Officer of Lockheed Martin.
Secretary of the Air Force	Heather Wilson	May 16, 2017	May 31, 2019	Resigned to become president of the University of Texas at El Paso.
Secretary of the Air Force	Matthew Donovan	June 1, 2019	October 18, 2019	Under Secretary Donovan was Acting Air Force Secretary until the confirmation of Barbara Barrett.
Under Secretary of the Air Force	Matthew Donovan	August 3, 2017	December 27, 2019	Left to serve as Under Secretary of Defense (Personnel and Readiness).
Under Secretary of the Air Force	Lisa Disbrow	February 24, 2016	June 30, 2017	
Secretary of the Army	Robert M. Speer	January 20, 2017	August 2, 2017	
Secretary of the Army	Ryan McCarthy	August 3, 2017	November 20, 2017	
Secretary of the Army	Ryan McCarthy	June 23, 2019	July 15, 2019	McCarthy was Acting Army Secretary while Esper was Acting Defense Secretary. When Esper was confirmed as Defense Secretary, McCarthy became Acting Army Secretary yet again. On September 26, 2019, the Senate confirmed McCarthy as Army Secretary.
Secretary of the Army	Mark Esper	November 20, 2017	July 23, 2019	
Secretary of Defense	Mark Esper	June 23, 2019	July 15, 2019	
Secretary of Defense	Mark Esper	July 23, 2019	November 9, 2020	
Secretary of Defense	Richard Spencer	July 15, 2019	July 23, 2019	President Trump appointed Esper Acting Defense Secretary and nominated him for Defense Secretary. By law, Esper could not serve as Acting Secretary during the confirmation process, so Spencer was Acting Defense Secretary for a brief period.
Secretary of the Navy	Richard Spencer	August 3, 2017	November 24, 2019	Forced out after clashing with President Trump over disciplining Navy SEAL Eddie Gallagher.
Secretary of the Navy	Sean Stackley	January 20, 2017	August 3, 2017	
Assistant Secretary of the Navy (Research, Development and Acquisition)	Sean Stackley	July 28, 2008	August 3, 2017	
Secretary of the Navy	Thomas Modly	November 25, 2019	April 7, 2020	Resigned after the controversial removal of USS Theodore Roosevelt Captain Brett Crozier.
Assistant Secretary of the Navy (Installations and Environment)	Phyllis L. Bayer	February 20, 2018	March 30, 2019	
Department of Defense Inspector General	Glenn Fine	January 14, 2016	April 7, 2020	Fine had been appointed the chair of the Pandemic Response Accountability Committee nine days before his dismissal. This committee oversaw the distribution of $2.2 trillion under the CARES Act.
Member of the Defense Science Board	James N. Miller	2014	June 2, 2020	Former Under Secretary of Defense for Policy. Resigned in protest after law enforcement officers used tear gas and rubber bullets to disperse lawfully assembled protesters outside the White House.

== Appointments (second administration) ==
=== Main Department ===
Office	Nominee	Assumed office	Left office
Secretary of Defense	Pete Hegseth	January 25, 2025 (Confirmed January 24, 2025, 51–50)	
Secretary of Defense	Robert G. Salesses	January 20, 2025	January 25, 2025
Deputy Secretary of Defense	Stephen Feinberg	March 17, 2025 (Confirmed March 14, 2025, 59–40)	
Deputy Secretary of Defense	Robert G. Salesses	January 28, 2025	March 17, 2025
General Counsel of Defense	Earl Matthews	July 31, 2025 (Confirmed July 29, 2025, 50–47)	
General Counsel of Defense	Charles L. Young III	January 20, 2025	July 31, 2025
Inspector General of Defense	Platte Moring	December 22, 2025 (Confirmed* December 18, 2025, 53–43); *En bloc confirmation of 97 nominees.	
Inspector General of Defense	Steven A. Stebbins	January 24, 2025	December 22, 2025
Chief Information Officer of Defense	Kirsten Davies	December 23, 2025 (Confirmed* December 18, 2025, 53–43); *En bloc confirmation of 97 nominees.	
Chief Information Officer of Defense	Katie Arrington	March 3, 2025	December 23, 2025
Assistant Secretary of Defense for Legislative Affairs	Dane Hughes	October 14, 2025 (Confirmed* October 7, 2025, 51–47); *En bloc confirmation of 107 nominees.	
Assistant Secretary of Defense for Legislative Affairs	Dane Hughes	January 20, 2025	October 14, 2025
Chairman of the Joint Chiefs of Staff	John D. Caine	April 11, 2025 (Confirmed April 11, 2025, 60–25)	
Chairman of the Joint Chiefs of Staff	Christopher W. Grady	February 21, 2025	April 11, 2025
Chief of Staff to the Secretary of Defense	Joe Kasper	January 20, 2025	April 2025
Assistant to the Secretary of Defense for Public Affairs	Sean Parnell	February 3, 2025	
Assistant to the Secretary of Defense for Public Affairs	Press Secretary Kingsley Wilson	May 27, 2025	
Assistant to the Secretary of Defense for Public Affairs	Deputy Press Secretary Joel Valdez	June 30, 2025	
Under Secretary of Defense for Acquisition and Sustainment	Michael P. Duffey	June 5, 2025 (Confirmed June 3, 2025, 51–46)	
Under Secretary of Defense for Acquisition and Sustainment	Steven J. Morani	January 20, 2025	June 5, 2025
Deputy Under Secretary of Defense for Acquisition and Sustainment	Brent G. Ingraham	January 22, 2025	September 22, 2025
Assistant Secretary of Defense for Homeland Defense and Global Security	Mark Ditlevson	May 26, 2026 (Confirmed* May 18, 2025, 46–43)	
Assistant Secretary of Defense for Homeland Defense and Global Security	Mark Ditlevson	April 21, 2025	December 2, 2025
Assistant Secretary of Defense for Nuclear, Chemical & Biological Defense Programs	Robert Kadlec	December 29, 2025 (Confirmed* December 18, 2025, 53–43); *En bloc confirmation of 97 nominees.	
Assistant Secretary of Defense for Nuclear, Chemical & Biological Defense Programs	Drew Walter	May 26, 2025	December 29, 2025
Assistant Secretary of Defense for Acquisition	James A. Ruocco	January 22, 2025	
Assistant Secretary of Defense for Acquisition	Brett G. Ingraham	January 20, 2025	January 22, 2025
Assistant Secretary of Defense for Sustainment	Brian Birdwell	May 29, 2026 (Confirmed* May 18, 2026, 46–43); *En bloc confirmation of 49 nominees.	
Assistant Secretary of Defense for Sustainment	Leigh E. Method	July 28, 2025	May 29, 2026
Director of Cost Assessment and Program Evaluation	Michael Payne	January 14, 2026 (Confirmed* December 18, 2025, 53–43); *En bloc confirmation of 97 nominees.	
Director of Cost Assessment and Program Evaluation	Michael Payne	January 20, 2025	January 14, 2026
Assistant Secretary of Defense for Industrial Base Policy	Michael Cadenazzi	September 23, 2025 (Confirmed* September 18, 2025, 51–44); *En bloc confirmation of 48 nominees.	
Assistant Secretary of Defense for Industrial Base Policy	Vic S. Ramdass	January 20, 2025	September 23, 2025
Assistant Secretary of Defense for International Armaments Cooperation	Michael Cadenazzi	December 23, 2025	
Assistant Secretary of Defense for International Armaments Cooperation	Daniel Zimmerman	Awaiting Senate Confirmation	
Assistant Secretary of Defense for Energy, Installations, and Environment	Dale Marks	June 10, 2025 (Confirmed June 3, 2025, 72–26)	
Assistant Secretary of Defense for Energy, Installations, and Environment	Robert E. Thompson	January 22, 2025	June 10, 2025
Director of Operational Test and Evaluation	Amy Henninger	March 23, 2026 (Confirmed* December 18, 2025, 53–43); *En bloc confirmation of 97 nominees.	
Director of Operational Test and Evaluation	Carroll P. Quade	May 30, 2025	March 23, 2026
Director of Operational Test and Evaluation	Dr. Raymond D. O'Toole, Jr.	January 20, 2025	May 30, 2025
Assistant Secretary of Defense for Special Operations and Low-Intensity Conflict	Derrick Anderson	December 29, 2025 (Confirmed* December 18, 2025, 53–43); *En bloc confirmation of 97 nominees.	
Assistant Secretary of Defense for Special Operations and Low-Intensity Conflict	Richard Tilley	August 25, 2025	December 29, 2025
Assistant Secretary of Defense for Special Operations and Low-Intensity Conflict	Michael Jensen	Nomination withdrawn by the President on May 12, 2025	
Assistant Secretary of Defense for Special Operations and Low-Intensity Conflict	Colby Jenkins	January 20, 2025	August 25, 2025
Assistant Secretary of Defense for Indo-Pacific Security Affairs	John Noh	December 29, 2025 (Confirmed* December 18, 2025, 53–43); *En bloc confirmation of 97 nominees.	
Assistant Secretary of Defense for Indo-Pacific Security Affairs	Jedidiah Royal	June 2, 2025	December 29, 2025
Assistant Secretary of Defense for Indo-Pacific Security Affairs	John Noh	January 22, 2025	June 2, 2025
Under Secretary of Defense for Policy	Elbridge Colby	April 9, 2025 (Confirmed April 8, 2025, 54–45)	
Under Secretary of Defense for Policy	Alexander Velez-Green	January 22, 2025	April 9, 2025
Deputy Under Secretary of Defense for Policy	Alexander Velez-Green	Awaiting Senate Confirmation	
Deputy Under Secretary of Defense for Policy	Austin Dahmer	March 17, 2025	
Deputy Under Secretary of Defense for Policy	Amanda J. Dory	January 22, 2025	March 17, 2025
Under Secretary of Defense for Personnel and Readiness	Anthony Tata	July 18, 2025 (Confirmed July 15, 2025, 52–46)	
Under Secretary of Defense for Personnel and Readiness	Jules W. Hurst III	March 17, 2025	July 18, 2025
Under Secretary of Defense for Personnel and Readiness	Darin Selnick	January 20, 2025	March 17, 2025
Deputy Under Secretary of Defense for Personnel and Readiness	Sean D. O'Keefe	September 25, 2025 (Confirmed* September 18, 2025, 51–44); *En bloc confirmation of 48 nominees.	
Deputy Under Secretary of Defense for Personnel and Readiness	Merlynn Carson	July 18, 2025	September 25, 2025
Deputy Under Secretary of Defense for Personnel and Readiness	Tim Dill	March 17, 2025	July 18, 2025
Deputy Under Secretary of Defense for Personnel and Readiness	Jules W. Hurst III	January 20, 2025	March 17, 2025
Senior Advisor to the Under Secretary of Defense for Personnel and Readiness	Stuart Scheller	April 2025	
Assistant Secretary of Defense for Manpower and Reserve Affairs	Tim Dill	December 29, 2025 (Confirmed* December 18, 2025, 53–43); *En bloc confirmation of 97 nominees.	
Assistant Secretary of Defense for Manpower and Reserve Affairs	Tim Dill	January 20, 2025	July 18, 2025
Assistant Secretary of Defense for Manpower and Reserve Affairs	Bill Fitzhugh	August 11, 2025	November 13, 2025
Assistant Secretary of Defense for Manpower and Reserve Affairs	Jules W. Hurst III	July 18, 2025	August 11, 2025
Assistant Secretary of Defense for Readiness	Maurice Todd	February 23, 2026 (Confirmed* December 18, 2025, 53–43); *En bloc confirmation of 97 nominees.	
Assistant Secretary of Defense for Readiness	Peter I. Belk	July 18, 2025	February 23, 2026
Assistant Secretary of Defense for Readiness	Jules W. Hurst III	January 20, 2025	July 18, 2025
Assistant Secretary of Defense for Health Affairs	Keith Bass	January 12, 2026 (Confirmed January 5, 2026, 50–35)	
Assistant Secretary of Defense for Health Affairs	Steve Ferrara	January 20, 2025	January 12, 2026
Under Secretary of Defense (Comptroller)/CFO	Jules W. Hurst III	August 12, 2026 (Confirmed* August 7, 2026, 51–47); *En bloc confirmation of 74 nominees.	
Under Secretary of Defense (Comptroller)/CFO	Jeff Bornstein	Nomination withdrawn by the President on October 21, 2025	
Under Secretary of Defense (Comptroller)/CFO	Jules W. Hurst III	August 11, 2025	May 20, 2026
Under Secretary of Defense (Comptroller)/CFO	Bryn Woollacott MacDonnell	January 20, 2025	August 9, 2025
Deputy Under Secretary of Defense (Comptroller)	Michael T. Powers	December 23, 2025 (Confirmed* December 18, 2025, 53–43); *En bloc confirmation of 97 nominees.	
Deputy Under Secretary of Defense (Comptroller)	Anne McAndrew	January 22, 2025	December 23, 2025
Under Secretary of Defense for Intelligence and Security	Bradley Hansell	July 25, 2025 (Confirmed July 22, 2025, 61–35)	
Under Secretary of Defense for Intelligence and Security	Dustin Gard-Weiss	January 20, 2025	July 25, 2025
Deputy Under Secretary of Defense for Intelligence and Security	Justin Overbaugh	September 23, 2025 (Confirmed* September 18, 2025, 51–44); *En bloc confirmation of 48 nominees.	
Under Secretary of Defense for Research and Engineering	Emil Michael	May 20, 2025 (Confirmed May 14, 2025, 54–43)	
Under Secretary of Defense for Research and Engineering	James G. Mazol	January 20, 2025	May 20, 2025
Deputy Under Secretary of Defense for Research and Engineering	James G. Mazol	December 29, 2025 (Confirmed* December 18, 2025, 53–43); *En bloc confirmation of 97 nominees.	
Deputy Under Secretary of Defense for Research and Engineering	James G. Mazol	May 20, 2025	July 1, 2025
Deputy Under Secretary of Defense for Research and Engineering	Joseph P. Morici	July 1, 2025	December 29, 2025
Deputy Under Secretary of Defense for Research and Engineering	Patrick Witt	January 20, 2025	May 20, 2025
Assistant Secretary of Defense for International Security Affairs	Daniel Zimmerman	July 8, 2025 (Confirmed June 23, 2025, 61–35)	
Assistant Secretary of Defense for International Security Affairs	Katherine E. Thompson	January 20, 2025	July 8, 2025
Assistant Secretary of Defense for Cyber Policy	Katherine Sutton	September 24, 2025 (Confirmed* September 18, 2025, 51–44); *En bloc confirmation of 48 nominees.	
Assistant Secretary of Defense for Cyber Policy	Austin Dahmer	September 5, 2025	September 24, 2025
Assistant Secretary of Defense for Cyber Policy	Laurie Buckhout	March 17, 2025	September 5, 2025
Assistant Secretary of Defense for Cyber Policy	Ashley Manning	January 20, 2025	March 17, 2025
Assistant Secretary of Defense for Critical Technologies	Michael Dodd	September 24, 2025 (Confirmed* September 18, 2025, 51–44); *En bloc confirmation of 48 nominees.	
Assistant Secretary of Defense for Science and Technology	Joseph S. Jewell	December 23, 2025 (Confirmed* December 18, 2025, 53–43); *En bloc confirmation of 97 nominees.	
Assistant Secretary of Defense for Science and Technology	Jacob Glassman	December 1, 2025	December 23, 2025
Assistant Secretary of Defense for Science and Technology	Michael J. Holthe	January 20, 2025	December 1, 2025
Assistant Secretary of Defense for Space Policy	Michael Gancio	September 30, 2026	
Assistant Secretary of Defense for Space Policy	Marc J. Berkowitz	January 5, 2026 (Confirmed* December 18, 2025, 53–43); *En bloc confirmation of 97 nominees.	September 30, 2026
Assistant Secretary of Defense for Space Policy	Robert Brose	July 10, 2025	January 5, 2026
Assistant Secretary of Defense for Space Policy	Robert Soofer	May 22, 2025	July 10, 2025
Assistant Secretary of Defense for Space Policy	Austin Dahmer	May 5, 2025	May 22, 2025
Assistant Secretary of Defense for Strategy, Plans, and Capabilities	Austin Dahmer	Awaiting Senate Confirmation	
Assistant Secretary of Defense for Strategy, Plans, and Capabilities	Rafael Leonardo	April 21, 2025	July 27, 2026
Assistant Secretary of Defense for Strategy, Plans, and Capabilities	Madeline Mortelmans	March 17, 2025	April 21, 2025
Assistant Secretary of Defense for Strategy, Plans, and Capabilities	Austin Dahmer	January 22, 2025	March 17, 2025
Assistant Secretary of Defense for Mission Capabilities	Jeremy Verbout	May 11, 2026	
Assistant Secretary of Defense for Mission Capabilities	James Caggy	December 29, 2025 (Confirmed* December 18, 2025, 53–43); *En bloc confirmation of 97 nominees.	May 11, 2026
Assistant Secretary of Defense for Mission Capabilities	Alex Lovett	September 29, 2025	December 29, 2025
Assistant Secretary of Defense for Mission Capabilities	Marcia B. Holmes	January 20, 2025	September 29, 2025
National Security Agency
Director of the National Security Agency	Joshua Rudd	March 16, 2026 (Confirmed March 10, 2026, 71–29)	
Director of the National Security Agency	William J. Hartman	April 3, 2025	March 15, 2026
Deputy Director of the National Security Agency	Sheila Thomas	April 3, 2025	January 9, 2026
Defense Advanced Research Projects Agency
Director of the Defense Advanced Research Projects Agency	Stephen Winchell	May 19, 2025	
Director of the Defense Advanced Research Projects Agency	Rob McHenry	January 20, 2025	May 19, 2025
National Reconnaissance Office
Director of the National Reconnaissance Office	Roger Mason	August 17, 2026 (Confirmed* August 7, 2026, 51–47); *En bloc confirmation of 74 nominees.	

=== Department of the Army ===
Office	Nominee	Assumed office	Left office
Secretary of the Army	Daniel P. Driscoll	February 25, 2025 (Confirmed February 25, 2025, 66–28)	September 2, 2026
Secretary of the Army	Mark Averill	January 20, 2025	February 25, 2025
Under Secretary of the Army	Michael Obadal	September 22, 2025 (Confirmed* September 18, 2025, 51–44); *En bloc confirmation of 48 nominees.	
Under Secretary of the Army	David R. Fitzgerald	January 20, 2025	September 22, 2025
General Counsel of the Army	Charles L. Young III	December 22, 2025 (Confirmed* December 18, 2025, 53–43); *En bloc confirmation of 97 nominees.	
Assistant Secretary of the Army for Acquisition, Logistics, and Technology	Brent G. Ingraham	September 22, 2025 (Confirmed* September 18, 2025, 51–44); *En bloc confirmation of 48 nominees.	
Assistant Secretary of the Army for Acquisition, Logistics, and Technology	Jesse D. Tolleson	May 5, 2025	September 22, 2025
Assistant Secretary of the Army for Acquisition, Logistics, and Technology	Patrick Mason	January 20, 2025	May 5, 2025
Assistant Secretary of the Army (Civil Works)	Adam Telle	August 5, 2025 (Confirmed August 2, 2025, 72-22)	
Assistant Secretary of the Army (Civil Works)	D. Lee Forsgren	March 31, 2025	August 5, 2025
Assistant Secretary of the Army (Civil Works)	Robyn S. Colosimo	January 20, 2025	March 31, 2025
Assistant Secretary of the Army (Financial Management and Comptroller)	Marc Andersen	October 15, 2025 (Confirmed* October 7, 2025, 51–47); *En bloc confirmation of 107 nominees.	
Assistant Secretary of the Army (Financial Management and Comptroller)	Candice Kinn	May 12, 2025	October 15, 2025
Assistant Secretary of the Army (Financial Management and Comptroller)	R. Wesley Robinson	January 20, 2025	May 12, 2025
Assistant Secretary of the Army for Installations, Energy and Environment	Jordan Gillis	October 6, 2025 (Confirmed* September 18, 2025, 51–44); *En bloc confirmation of 48 nominees.	
Assistant Secretary of the Army for Installations, Energy and Environment	Jeff Waksman	April 20, 2025	October 6, 2025
Assistant Secretary of the Army for Installations, Energy and Environment	Daniel Klippstein	January 20, 2025	April 20, 2025
Assistant Secretary of the Army (Manpower and Reserve Affairs)	Jules W. Hurst III	May 20, 2026 (Confirmed* September 18, 2025, 51–44); *En bloc confirmation of 48 nominees.	August 12, 2026
Assistant Secretary of the Army (Manpower and Reserve Affairs)	Derrick M. Anderson	April 9, 2025	December 29, 2025
Assistant Secretary of the Army (Manpower and Reserve Affairs)	Julie A. Banks	February 25, 2025	April 9, 2025
Assistant Secretary of the Army (Manpower and Reserve Affairs)	Mark R. Lewis	January 20, 2025	February 25, 2025

=== Department of the Navy ===
Office	Nominee	Assumed office	Left office
Secretary of the Navy	Hung Cao		
Secretary of the Navy	Hung Cao	Awaiting Senate Confirmation	
Secretary of the Navy	Hung Cao	April 22, 2026	
Secretary of the Navy	John Phelan	March 25, 2025 (Confirmed March 24, 2025, 62–30)	April 22, 2026
Secretary of the Navy	Terence Emmert	January 20, 2025	March 25, 2025
Under Secretary of the Navy	Hung Cao	October 3, 2025 (Confirmed October 1, 2025, 52–45)	
Under Secretary of the Navy	William Toti		
Under Secretary of the Navy	William Toti	Awaiting Senate Confirmation	
Under Secretary of the Navy	William Toti	May 1, 2026	September 15, 2026
Under Secretary of the Navy	Brett A. Seidle	April 16, 2025	October 3, 2025
Under Secretary of the Navy	Victor Minella	January 22, 2025	April 16, 2025
General Counsel of the Navy	David Denton Jr.	December 19, 2025 (Confirmed* December 18, 2025, 53–43); *En bloc confirmation of 97 nominees.	
General Counsel of the Navy	Tim Dill	July 21, 2025	December 19, 2025
General Counsel of the Navy	Catherine L. Kessmeier	January 20, 2025	July 21, 2025
Assistant Secretary of the Navy (Manpower and Reserve Affairs)	Benjamin Kohlmann	December 23, 2025 (Confirmed* December 18, 2025, 53–43); *En bloc confirmation of 97 nominees.	
Assistant Secretary of the Navy (Manpower and Reserve Affairs)	C. Scott "Sonny" Duncan	July 29, 2025	December 23, 2025
Assistant Secretary of the Navy (Manpower and Reserve Affairs)	Jennifer A. LaTorre	March 31, 2025	July 29, 2025
Assistant Secretary of the Navy (Manpower and Reserve Affairs)	Robert D. Hogue	January 20, 2025	March 31, 2025
Assistant Secretary of the Navy (Energy, Installations and Environment)	Brendan Rogers	December 23, 2025 (Confirmed* December 18, 2025, 53–43); *En bloc confirmation of 97 nominees.	
Assistant Secretary of the Navy (Energy, Installations and Environment)	Elmer Román	July 22, 2025	December 23, 2025
Assistant Secretary of the Navy (Energy, Installations and Environment)	Brenda M. Johnson-Turner	March 31, 2025	July 22, 2025
Assistant Secretary of the Navy (Energy, Installations and Environment)	Peter S. Lynch	January 20, 2025	March 31, 2025
Assistant Secretary of the Navy (Financial Management and Comptroller)	Arthur Miller	Awaiting Senate Confirmation	
Assistant Secretary of the Navy (Financial Management and Comptroller)	Alaleh Jenkins	January 20, 2025	
Assistant Secretary of the Navy (Research, Development and Acquisition)	Richard Breckenridge	Awaiting Senate Confirmation	
Assistant Secretary of the Navy (Research, Development and Acquisition)	William Mahan	May 26, 2026	
Assistant Secretary of the Navy (Research, Development and Acquisition)	Jason L. Potter	July 16, 2025	May 26, 2026
Assistant Secretary of the Navy (Research, Development and Acquisition)	Brett A. Seidle	January 20, 2025	July 16, 2025
Chief of Naval Operations	Daryl Caudle	August 25, 2025 (Confirmed July 31, 2025, voice vote)	
Chief of Naval Operations	James Kilby	February 21, 2025	August 25, 2025

=== Department of the Air Force ===
Office	Nominee	Assumed office	Left office
Secretary of the Air Force	Troy Meink	May 16, 2025 (Confirmed May 13, 2025, 74–25)	
Secretary of the Air Force	Gary A. Ashworth	January 20, 2025	May 13, 2025
Under Secretary of the Air Force	Matthew L. Lohmeier	July 25, 2025 (Confirmed July 24, 2025, 52–46)	
Under Secretary of the Air Force	Edwin Oshiba	February 24, 2025	July 25, 2025
Under Secretary of the Air Force	Jennifer L. Miller	January 20, 2025	February 24, 2025
General Counsel of the Air Force	William Lane III	January 2026 (Confirmed* December 18, 2025, 53–43); *En bloc confirmation of 97 nominees.	
General Counsel of the Air Force	Shannon Ann McGuire	January 20, 2025	January 2026
Assistant Secretary of the Air Force (Acquisition, Technology and Logistics)	William D. Bailey	June 2, 2025	
Assistant Secretary of the Air Force (Acquisition, Technology and Logistics)	Darlene J. Costello	January 20, 2025	June 2, 2025
Assistant Secretary of the Air Force (Installations, Environment & Energy)	Michael Borders Jr.	January 23, 2026 (Confirmed* December 18, 2025, 53–43); *En bloc confirmation of 97 nominees.	
Assistant Secretary of the Air Force (Installations, Environment & Energy)	Michael E. Saunders	January 20, 2025	January 23, 2026
Assistant Secretary of the Air Force (Financial Management & Comptroller)	Philip Weinberg	November 21, 2025 (Confirmed* October 7, 2025, 51–47); *En bloc confirmation of 107 nominees.	
Assistant Secretary of the Air Force (Financial Management & Comptroller)	Lara C. Sayer	July 28, 2025	November 21, 2025
Assistant Secretary of the Air Force (Manpower & Reserve Affairs)	Richard Anderson	September 22, 2025 (Confirmed* September 18, 2025, 51–44); *En bloc confirmation of 48 nominees.	
Assistant Secretary of the Air Force (Manpower & Reserve Affairs)	Gwendolyn Defilippi	January 20, 2025	July 25, 2025
Assistant Secretary of the Air Force for Space Acquisition and Integration	Erich Hernandez-Baquero	August 24, 2026 (Confirmed* August 7, 2026, 51–47); *En bloc confirmation of 74 nominees.	
Director of the Space Development Agency	Derek Tournear	April 17, 2025	
Director of the Space Development Agency	William B. Blauser	February 5, 2025	April 16, 2025
Vice Chief of Staff of the Air Force	Scott L. Pleus	February 21, 2025	February 9, 2026

== Notes ==
=== Confirmation votes ===
Confirmations by roll call vote (first administration)

Confirmations by voice vote (first administration)

Confirmations by roll call vote (second administration)

Confirmations by voice vote (second administration)
