= Office of the Secretary of Defense =

United States government agency management and oversight body

Office of the Secretary of Defense OSD
- OSD Identification Badge

Agency overview
- Formed: 1947
- Jurisdiction: General management and oversight of the Department of Defense components
- Headquarters: Pentagon
- Parent agency: Department of Defense
- Website: defense.gov/osd

The Office of the Secretary of Defense (OSD) is a headquarters-level staff of the United States Department of Defense. It is the principal civilian staff element of the U.S. secretary of defense, and it assists the secretary in carrying out authority, direction, and control of the Department of Defense in the exercise of policy development, planning, resource management, fiscal, and program evaluation responsibilities. OSD (along with the Joint Staff) is the secretary of defense's support staff for managing the Department of Defense, and it corresponds to what the Executive Office of the President of the U.S. is to the U.S. president for managing the whole of the Executive branch of the federal government. As of March 2026 the secretary of defense is Pete Hegseth. Since 2025 the secondary title "Office of the Secretary of War" (OSW) is a secondary name, permitted only in ceremonial and non-statutory contexts.

OSD includes the immediate offices of the secretary (SECDEF) and the deputy secretary of defense (DEPSECDEF), as well as the under-secretary of defense for research and engineering; under-secretary of defense for acquisition and sustainment; under-secretary of defense for policy; under-secretary of defense (Comptroller); under-secretary of defense for personnel and readiness; and under-secretary of defense for intelligence & security. All of these positions are presidential appointments which require U.S. Senate confirmation, as do each of their sole deputies. Other positions include the assistant secretaries of defense, assistants to the secretary of defense, General Counsel, Director, Operational Test and Evaluation, Director of Administration and Management, and other staff offices that the secretary establishes to assist in carrying out their assigned responsibilities.

== History ==
In 2025, President Donald Trump authorized "Office of the Secretary of War" (OSW) as a secondary title for the Office of the Secretary of Defense, permitted in ceremonial and non-statutory contexts; only an act of Congress can change the name of the office associated with the department.

== Composition ==
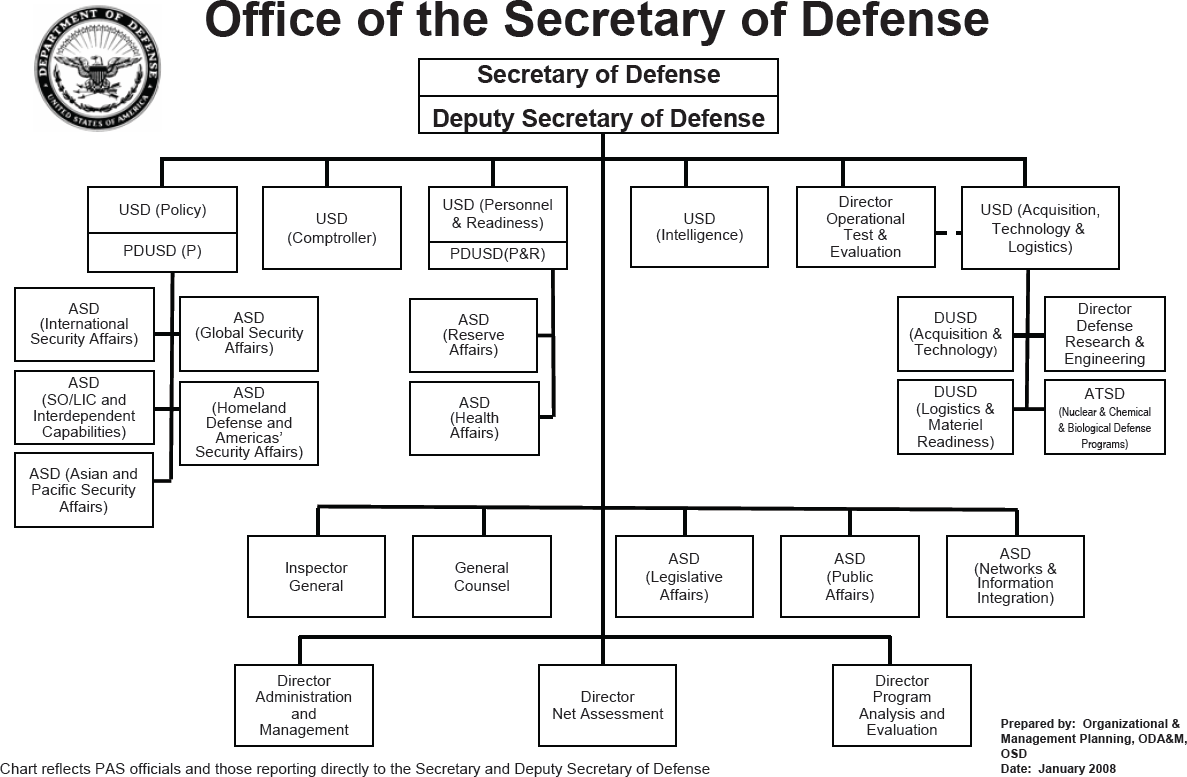
2008 Office of the Secretary of Defense Structure.

The secretary and deputy secretary manage several under secretaries, each of whom in turn manages several assistant secretaries of defense. There are also several special officers reporting directly to the Secretary of Defense.

Major elements of OSD (listed hierarchically):

- Secretary of Defense (SecDef) and Deputy Secretary of Defense (DepSecDef)
  - Senior officials reporting directly to Secretary and Deputy
    - Executive Secretary of the Office of the Secretary of Defense (ExecSec)
    - Senior Military Assistant to the Secretary of Defense
    - General Counsel of the Department of Defense
    - Assistant to the Secretary of Defense for Public Affairs
    - Assistant to the Secretary of Defense for Privacy, Civil Liberties & Transparency
    - Chief Information Officer
    - Senior Designated Officials of SECDEF-Empowered Cross Functional Teams
  - Assistant Secretaries reporting directly to Secretary and Deputy
    - Assistant Secretary of Defense for Legislative Affairs (LA)
  - Senior officials under general supervision of the Secretary and Deputy
    - Department of Defense Office of Inspector General
  - Under Secretaries
    - Under Secretary of Defense (Comptroller)/Chief Financial Officer (C/CFO)
      - Deputy Under Secretary of Defense (Comptroller)
      - Deputy Comptroller (Program/Budget)
      - Deputy Comptroller (Budget and Appropriation Affairs)
      - Deputy Chief Financial Officer
      - Director, Business Operations
    - Under Secretary of Defense for Acquisition and Sustainment (A&S)
      - Deputy Under Secretary of Defense for Acquisition and Sustainment
      - Assistant Secretary of Defense for Acquisition
      - Assistant Secretary of Defense for Sustainment
      - Assistant Secretary of Defense for Energy, Installations, and Environment
      - Assistant Secretary of Defense for Nuclear Deterrence, Chemical & Biological Defense Policy & Programs (ND-CBD)
      - Assistant Secretary of Defense for Industrial Base Policy (IBP)
    - Under Secretary of Defense for Intelligence and Security (I&S)
      - Deputy Under Secretary of Defense for Intelligence and Security
    - Under Secretary of Defense for Personnel and Readiness (P&R)
      - Deputy Under Secretary of Defense for Personnel and Readiness
      - Assistant Secretary of Defense for Health Affairs (HA)
      - Assistant Secretary of Defense for Manpower and Reserve Affairs (M&RA)
      - Assistant Secretary of Defense for Readiness (R)
    - Under Secretary of Defense for Policy (P)
      - Deputy Under Secretary of Defense for Policy
      - Assistant Secretary of Defense for Indo-Pacific Security Affairs (IPSA)
      - Assistant Secretary of Defense for Special Operations and Low-Intensity Conflict
      - Assistant Secretary of Defense for Homeland Defense and Hemispheric Affairs (HD&HA)
      - Assistant Secretary of Defense for International Security Affairs (ISA)
      - Assistant Secretary of Defense for Special Operations and Low Intensity Conflict (SO&LIC)
      - Assistant Secretary of Defense for Space Policy
      - Assistant Secretary of Defense for Strategy, Plans, and Capabilities
    - Under Secretary of Defense for Research and Engineering
      - Deputy Under Secretary of Defense for Research and Engineering
      - Assistant Secretary of Defense for Critical Technologies
      - Assistant Secretary of Defense for Science and Technology
      - Assistant Secretary of Defense for Mission Capabilities
      - Chief Digital and Artificial Intelligence Office
  - Directors
    - Director of Administration and Management (DA&M)
    - Director of Cost Assessment and Program Evaluation (CAPE)
    - Director, Strategic Capabilities Office
    - Director, Defense Innovation Unit
    - Director, Operational Test and Evaluation (DOT&E)

=== Former elements ===
- Assistant Secretary of Defense for Networks and Information Integration (NII) - now the DoD Chief Information Officer
- Defense Prisoner of War/Missing Personnel Office (DPMO)
- Director of Net Assessment

== Major reorganizations ==
The composition of OSD is in a state of consistent flux, as Congress and DoD routinely create new offices, redesignate existing ones, and abolish others.

=== Obama administration changes ===
During the Obama administration, Congress had sought to clarify the organization of the Office of the Secretary of Defense (OSD) and worked with the Department of Defense to move toward a standardization of official naming conventions. Many Defense officials, including the Deputy Secretary of Defense (DepSecDef), all five Under Secretaries of Defense (USDs), and all Assistant Secretaries of Defense (ASDs), as well as any officials specifically designated in U.S. Code have historically been considered Presidentially-Appointed, Senate-Confirmed (PAS) officials, requiring consent of the Senate before the appointee operates in an official capacity. In a March 2009 letter, Senator Carl Levin, Chairman of the Senate Armed Service Committee, wrote that the Defense Department was apparently exercising the authority to appoint other significant officials—termed Deputy Under Secretaries of Defense (DUSDs)—"without statutory authorization, without limitation, and without Senate confirmation." Levin was "concerned that the proliferation of DUSDs at multiple levels of the organization could muddy lines of authority and may not be in the best interest of the Department of Defense." Subsequent legislation established five Senate-confirmed Principal Deputies (i.e., "first assistants"), one for each Under Secretary of Defense.

The NDAA (National Defense Authorization Act) of fiscal year 2010 gave the Department of Defense until January 1, 2011, to eliminate or redesignate all other Deputy Under Secretaries (DUSDs) who are not Principal Deputy Under Secretaries of Defense (PDUSDs). The FY11 National Defense Authorization Act extended this deadline to January 1, 2015. During that time, the Secretary was allowed, at his or her discretion, to appoint within the Office of the Secretary of Defense five additional non-PAS (Presidentially-appointed, Senate-confirmed) Deputy Under Secretaries of Defense (DUSDs) beyond the five statutory PAS-PDUSDs. The USD(I)–Intelligence–appears to be maintaining at least three non-PAS DUSDs, although they have been renamed. The USD (AT&L)–Acquisition, Technology, & Logistics–has maintained the non-PAS DUSD for Installations and Environment, though the FY11 NDAA recommended merging this post with the newly created ASD for Operational Energy Plans and Programs. The USD(P) has maintained a non-PAS DUSD for Strategy, Plans, and Forces, even though the FY11 NDAA recommended eliminating this position.

Nevertheless, several positions were redesignated or eliminated during the Obama administration, pursuant to statutory language contained in the National Defense Authorization Acts of FY10 and FY11. and subsequent internal DoD reports.

Obama Administration OSD Redesignations and Eliminations
Previous Office Title	New Office Title	Reports To	Requires Senate Confirmation?
New position	ASD for Acquisition	USD(AT&L)	Yes
DUSD for Industrial Policy	DASD for Manufacturing and Industrial Base	ASD for Acquisition	No
DUSD for Logistics and Material Readiness	ASD for Logistics and Material Readiness	USD(AT&L)	Yes
Director of Operational Energy Plans and Programs	ASD for Operational Energy Plans and Programs	USD(AT&L)	Yes
Assistant to the Secretary of Defense for Nuclear and Chemical and Biological Defense Programs	ASD for Nuclear, Chemical, and Biological Defense Programs	USD(AT&L)	Yes
Director of Defense Research and Engineering	ASD for Research and Engineering (R&E)	USD(AT&L)	Yes
Director of Developmental Test and Evaluation	DASD for Developmental Test and Evaluation	ASD(R&E)	No
Director of Systems Engineering	DASD for Systems Engineering	ASD(R&E)	No
New position	ASD for Readiness and Force Management (R&FM)	USD(P&R)	Yes
DUSD for Civilian Personnel Policy	DASD for Civilian Personnel Policy	ASD for Readiness and Force Management (R&FM)	No
DUSD for Military Community and Family Policy	DASD for Military Community and Family Policy	ASD for Readiness and Force Management (R&FM)	No
DUSD for Military Personnel Policy	DASD for Military Personnel Policy	ASD for Readiness and Force Management (R&FM)	No
DUSD for Readiness	DASD for Readiness	ASD for Readiness and Force Management (R&FM)	No
DUSD for Wounded Warrior Care and Transition Policy	DASD for Wounded Warrior Care and Transition Policy	ASD for Readiness and Force Management (R&FM)	No
DUSD for Joint & Coalition Warfighter Support	DDI for Warfighter Support & Operations	Under Secretary of Defense for Intelligence	No
DUSD for Technical Collection & Analysis and HUMINT, Counterintel & Security	DDI for Intelligence & Security	Under Secretary of Defense for Intelligence	No
DUSD for Portfolio Programs & Resources	DDI for Military Intelligence Program & Planning	Under Secretary of Defense for Intelligence	No
DUSD for Science and Technology	Eliminated	-	n/a
DUSD for Advanced Systems and Concepts	Eliminated	-	n/a

- Director for Defense Intelligence = DDI, DUSD = Deputy Under Secretary of Defense, ASD = Assistant Secretary of Defense, DASD = Deputy Assistant Secretary of Defense

== See also ==
- The Air Staff
- Headquarters Marine Corps
- The Joint Staff
- Office of the Secretary of the Army
- Office of the Secretary of the Navy
- Office of the Secretary of the Air Force
- Secretary of Defense-Empowered Cross-Functional Teams
