= United States Assistant Secretary of Defense =

Several posts in the US government

Flag of a U.S. Assistant Secretary of Defense

Assistant Secretary of Defense is a title used for many high-level executive positions in the Office of the Secretary of Defense within the U.S. Department of Defense. The Assistant Secretary of Defense title is junior to Under Secretary of Defense. Reorganization Plan No. 6 of 30 June 1953 increased the number of assistant secretaries. The National Defense Authorization Act for Fiscal Year 2023 added three new Assistant Secretary positions under the under secretary for research and engineering.

== Current Assistant Secretaries of Defense ==
The list of Assistant Secretaries of Defense includes:

- Office of the Under Secretary of Defense for Personnel and Readiness
  1. Assistant Secretary of Defense for Health Affairs
  2. Assistant Secretary of Defense for Manpower and Reserve Affairs
  3. Assistant Secretary of Defense for Readiness
- Office of the Under Secretary of Defense for Acquisition and Sustainment
  1. Assistant Secretary of Defense for Acquisition
  2. Assistant Secretary of Defense for Energy, Installations, and Environment
  3. Assistant Secretary of Defense for Industrial Base Policy
  4. Assistant Secretary of Defense for Nuclear Deterrence, Chemical, and Biological Defense Policy and Programs
  5. Assistant Secretary of Defense for Sustainment
  6. Assistant Secretary of Defense for International Armaments Cooperation
- Office of the Under Secretary of Defense for Policy
  1. Assistant Secretary of Defense for Cyber Policy
  2. Assistant Secretary of Defense for Homeland Defense and Hemispheric Affairs
  3. Assistant Secretary of Defense for Indo-Pacific Security Affairs
  4. Assistant Secretary of Defense for International Security Affairs
  5. Assistant Secretary of Defense for Nuclear Deterrence, Chemical, and Biological Defense Policy and Programs
  6. Assistant Secretary of Defense for Space Policy
  7. Assistant Secretary of Defense for Special Operations/Low Intensity Conflict
  8. Assistant Secretary of Defense for Strategy, Plans, and Capabilities
- Office of the Under Secretary of Defense for Research and Engineering
  1. Assistant Secretary of Defense for Critical Technologies
  2. Assistant Secretary of Defense for Mission Capabilities
  3. Assistant Secretary of Defense for Science and Technology
- Reports to the Secretary of Defense
  1. Assistant Secretary of Defense for Legislative Affairs

Former Assistant Secretary of Defense positions include:

- Assistant Secretary of Defense for Public Affairs, originally established as the Assistant to the Secretary (Director, Office of Public Information) by Secretary James V. Forrestal in July 1948.
- Assistant Secretary of Defense for Networks and Information Integration
- Assistant Secretary of Defense for Internal Communications
- Assistant Secretary of Defense for Global Strategic Affairs

== Assistant Secretaries in the Military Departments ==
There are also several assistant secretaries in each of the three Military Departments: Department of the Army, Department of the Navy, and the Department of the Air Force.

- Assistant Secretary of the Army
- Assistant Secretary of the Navy
- Assistant Secretary of the Air Force

== See also ==
- Deputy Secretary of Defense, the number two position, next to the Secretary of Defense
- Assistant Secretary of War
