= Rudolph Winnacker =

American historian (1904–1985)

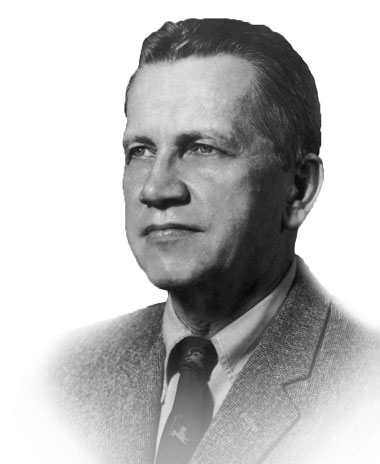
- Born: 25 August 1904
- Died: June 1985 (aged 80)
- Occupation: Historian
- Organization: Chief Historian of the Office of the Secretary of Defense

Rudolph A. Winnacker (25 August 1904 – June 1985) was the first chief historian of the Office of the Secretary of Defense, serving from 1949 to 1973.

Winnacker completed a PhD at Harvard University in 1933. He taught for 10 years at the Universities of Nebraska and Michigan, and at the National War College.

During World War II, he carried out research for the Office of Strategic Services at its Research and Analysis Branch in Washington, D.C., and overseas.

In 1953, he worked on the report of the Rockefeller Committee on Department of Defense Organization. This work culminated in the Department of Defense Reorganization Act of 1958. This legislation established the Advanced Research Projects Agency, eventually known as DARPA.
