= United States Deputy Under Secretary of Defense =

US government official position

Deputy Under Secretary of Defense (DUSD) is the title for several high-ranking posts in the U.S. Department of Defense, requiring appointment by the president and are confirmed by the Senate by majority vote. There are currently six DUSDs, one for each Under Secretary of Defense. From 2010 until 2017, these positions were known as Principal Deputy Under Secretary of Defense (PDUSD). The title for these positions was renamed to remove the word "Principal" as part of the National Defense Authorization Act for Fiscal Year 2018.

Formerly, there also existed the position of Deputy Under Secretary of Defense (DUSD). Some of these positions require appointment by the president and are confirmed by the Senate by majority vote, while others did not require Senate confirmation. The use of these titles was severely restricted by the FY2010 and FY2011 National Defense Authorization Act (NDAA).

== Current usage ==
=== Principal Deputy Under Secretary of Defense ===
There currently exist six DUSDs. The six DUSDs are:

Position	Portrait	Name	Assumed office
Deputy Under Secretary of Defense for Research and Engineering		James G. Mazol	December 29, 2025
Deputy Under Secretary of Defense for Acquisition and Sustainment		Daniel L. Zimmerman (Performing the Duties of)	July 26, 2026
Deputy Under Secretary of Defense for Policy		Austin Dahmer (Performing the Duties of)	March 17, 2025
Deputy Under Secretary of Defense for Personnel and Readiness		Sean D. O'Keefe	September 25, 2025
Deputy Under Secretary of Defense (Comptroller)		Michael T. Powers	December 23, 2025
Deputy Under Secretary of Defense for Intelligence and Security		Justin Overbaugh	September 23, 2025

Each of the DUSDs serves as the "first assistant" to the corresponding Under Secretary of Defense, and would serve as the acting Under Secretary in the Under Secretary's absence. The DUSD is not "directly responsible for a specified portfolio within the Office of the Under Secretary," but instead is responsible for assisting the Under Secretary with the entire portfolio. Reporting to the DUSDs are Assistant Secretaries of Defense, who are appointed by the president and confirmed by the Senate, and Directors, Directors of Defense Intelligence, and similar positions, who are not subject to Senate confirmation. The DUSD for Intelligence is required by law to be "appointed from among persons who have extensive expertise in intelligence matters."

== Former usage ==
=== Creation and expansion of use ===
The title Deputy Under Secretary of Defense was first used in 1986 with the creation of the position of DUSD for Acquisition. Initially, differentiation between the PDUSD and DUSD was not clear, with some positions officially referred to by both titles. By 2009, there were 29 PDUSD and DUSD positions. Five of these positions were established by statute of which four required confirmation by the Senate. Others were created by the Department of Defense itself. Four of the DUSDs were designated either by Congress or by DOD to be "Principal Deputy" for the Undersecretary. These DUSDs were known as PDUSDs. The reporting relationship between the DUSDs and other senior leaders in the department was not uniform. Some DUSDs reported directly to an Under Secretary of Defense, while others reported to a PDUSD, another DUSD, or another Presidentially appointed senior official. Four of the five Under Secretaries of Defense had a PDUSD reporting to them, of which two were designated by Congress and appointed by the president.

=== Intervention by Congress and elimination ===
In early 2009, concerned about the proliferation of the DUSD title and the lack of clarity of its role in the DOD organization, Senator Carl Levin, then the Chair of the Senate Armed Services Committee sent a letter to the Deputy Secretary of Defense requesting clarification on the role of the DUSD. This letter along with discussions with the DOD led to a provision in the FY2010 NDAA that:

- Established in law (10 U.S.C. § 137a) a PDUSD to be the primary deputy to each of the five Under Secretaries of Defense.
- Eliminated the DUSD roles that were mentioned in law (or transformed them into other roles).
- Directed the elimination of the DUSD role from within DOD by January 1, 2011.
- Required the DOD issue a report to Congress on how it intends to eliminate the DUSD role.

Of the 28 DUSDs that had existed prior to FY2010 NDAA, five were designated as PDUSDs, two were designated by FY2010 NDAA as Assistant Secretaries of Defense, which left 21 DUSDs for the DOD to determine the appropriate treatment of. The Department of Defense proposed having 10 of the DUSDs report to an Assistant Secretary of Defense and would be changed to Deputy Assistant Secretaries of Defense. This required redesignating a Director as Assistant Secretaries of Defense, in accordance with the reports plan of standardizing titles, under whom four of the former DUSDs would report as well as the creation of a new Assistant Secretary position under whom the other five DUSDs would report. Two positions were eliminated by restructuring responsibilities, and four of the DUSDs were given new titles (Director, Deputy Comptroller, and Chief of Staff). The remaining five positions were considered by the DOD to be responsible for "major pillars of activity" that required a sufficient title to indicate their importance, but "do not warrant being elevated to the level of a PAS official". DOD believed that DUSD was the most appropriate title for these positions, and recommended that Congress amend the allow to allow them to be retained as DUSDs.

Congress agreed to most of the changes proposed, redesignated the Director as an Assistant Secretary of Defense and created the new Assistant Secretary of Defense position recommended by the DOD report. However, Congress did not agree that the DUSD position should be retained, outside of the five PDUSDS, but gave DOD until January 1, 2015, to eliminate the remaining five DUSDs. Of the five remaining DUSDs, three reported to the Under Secretary of Defense for Intelligence. It was determined that these should be redesignated as Directors of Defense Intelligence. This title was chosen as it "properly convey appropriate status and stature for these principal policy advisors to the" Under Secretary of Defense for Intelligence. The DUSD for Installation and Environment was merged with the Assistant Secretary of Defense for Assistant Secretary of Defense for Operation Energy Plans & Programs (renamed the Assistant Secretary of Defense for Energy, Installations, and Environment). The Office of the Under Secretary of Defense for Policy was restructured to eliminate one of the Assistant Secretary of Defense positions, and the DUSD for Strategy Plans and Forces was elevated to Assistant Secretary of Defense for Strategy Plans and Capabilities.
