= Aprille Ericsson =

African American mechanical engineer

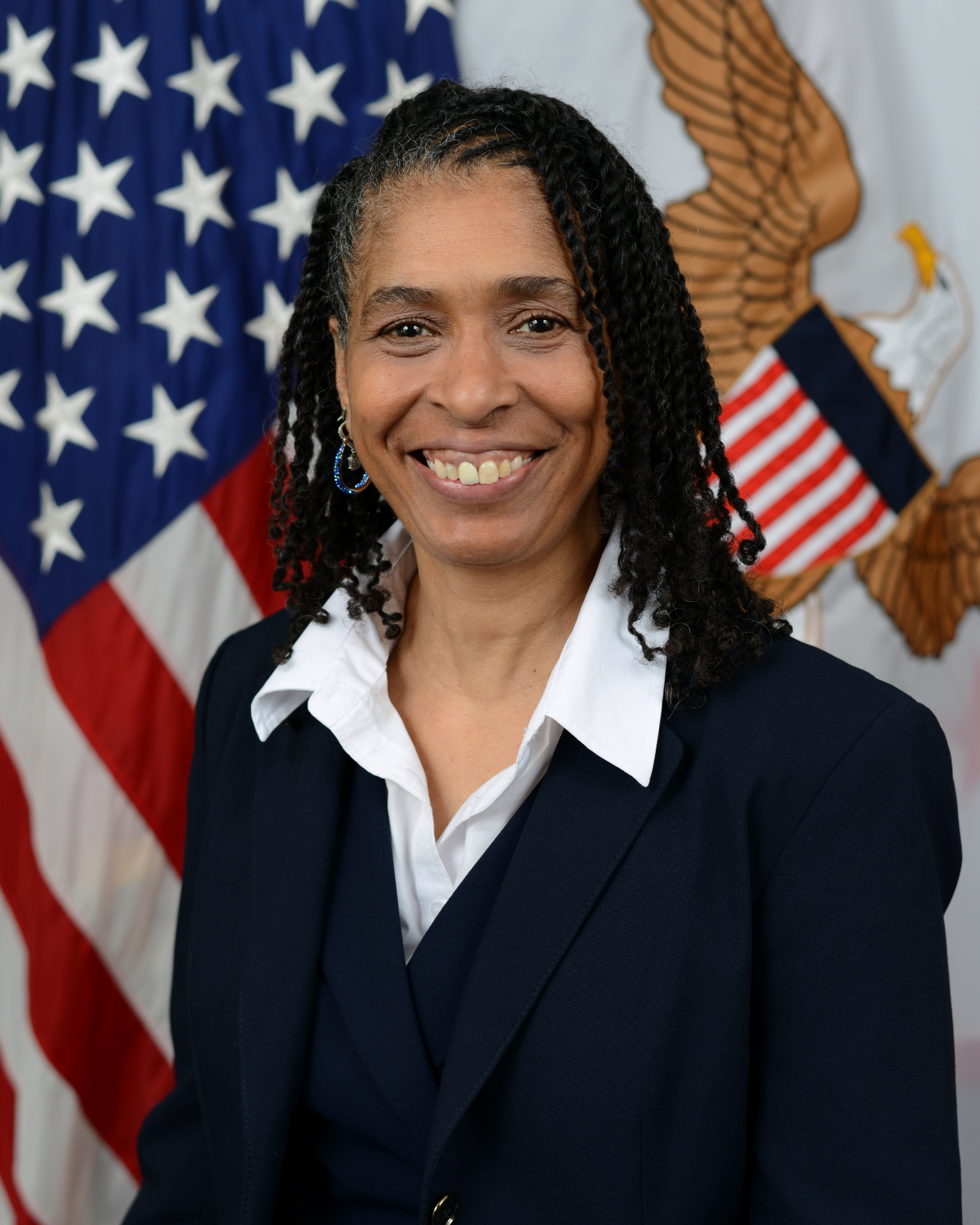

Assistant Secretary of Defense for Science and Technology
- In office March 29, 2024 – January 20, 2025
- President: Joe Biden
- Preceded by: Position established
- Succeeded by: Joseph Jewell

Personal details
- Born: Aprille Joy Ericsson; April 1, 1963 (age 63) New York City, New York, U.S.
- Education: Massachusetts Institute of Technology (BS); Howard University (MS, PhD)

Aprille Joy Ericsson (born April 1, 1963) is an American aerospace engineer who had served as the assistant secretary of defense for science and technology. Ericsson is the first African-American woman to receive a Ph.D. in mechanical engineering from Howard University and the first African-American woman to receive a Ph.D. in engineering at the National Aeronautics and Space Administration (NASA) Goddard Space Flight Center (GSFC).

== Early life ==
Aprille Ericsson was born and grew up in the Bedford Stuyvesant neighborhood of Brooklyn, New York, and later moved to Cambridge, Massachusetts, to attend high school at the Cambridge School of Weston. She has said that her interest in astronautics manifested at an early age; she recalled watching the Apollo missions when she was in the second grade. Ericsson’s dream of entering the Astronaut Program in NASA came to an end as she has asthma and has an issue with her knee. In the summer of 1980 as a junior in high school, she attended MIT UNITE (now called MITES, Minority Introduction to Engineering & Science), an engineering outreach program for minority students at MIT. She earned her Bachelor of Science in Aeronautical/Astronautical Engineering at MIT in 1986. She was then awarded a master's degree in engineering from Howard University in 1990, followed by a doctorate in mechanical engineering, the first African-American woman to do so.

== Career and teaching ==
While attending graduate school at Howard University, Ericsson accepted an aerospace engineer position at the NASA Goddard Flight Center in Maryland. Ericsson has served as an engineer, technologist, instrument lead, and project and program manager at NASA for more than 30 years, lending her technical and managerial expertise to projects including the James Webb Space Telescope, the Lunar Reconnaissance Orbiter, the Tropical Rainfall Measuring Mission (TRMM), and the Ice, Cloud, and land Elevation Satellite-2 (ICESat-2). Until recently, she was the new business lead for NASA Goddard Space Flight Center’s Instrument Systems and Technology Division, which connects scientists and project managers with the instrument technologies they need to accomplish their missions. In this role, she fosters partnerships between government agencies and universities, industry, and small businesses.

Ericsson has worked in various groups within NASA, including the Robotics group and the Guidance Navigation & Control Discipline. Her work in the latter helps spacecraft stabilize and manage their orientation and position during missions. She has also worked on missions that send spacecraft to other bodies within the Solar System. Projects to which she has contributed early in her career include satellites that monitor the Earth; one such project, the Tropical Rain Measuring Mission, provides data on the atmospheric phenomena El Niño and La Niña and their effects on crop productivity.

As Project Engineer, she supported the development of the laser instrumentation for the Lunar Reconnaissance Orbiter, which was launched in 2009.

Ericsson helped manage science instruments such as the Advanced Topographic Laser Altimeter System (ATLAS), which uses lasers to measure ice sheet depth and the height of vegetation canopies. She was also the instrument manager for a proposed mission to bring dust back from the lower atmosphere of Mars back to Earth.

In addition to her roles as an engineer, Ericsson has been passionate about mentoring young people and students for much of her life and career, beginning in high school and college. By lecturing and serving on advisory boards at multiple universities, advising pre-college STEM programs, and reviewing proposals for NASA- and NSF-funded grants, Ericsson has supported numerous engineering students and young professionals pursuing careers in science, technology, engineering, and math. She currently advises students at Massachusetts Institute of Technology (MIT) and Howard University. Ericsson has taught at Howard University and Bowie State University, leading courses in mathematics and mechanical engineering. She has also contributed instruction on Aerospace theory at HU Public Charter Middle School of Math and Science. She works to motivate minority students in science and engineering, and serves as the lead Advisor for the Dynamical Mathematical Visionaries National Society of Engineering Jr. Chapter in Washington, DC. She has served as a Nifty Fifty speaker for the USA Science and Engineering Festival since 2010. She has spoken at the Oprah Winfrey Leadership Academy for Girls in South Africa. Her efforts were recognized by NASA's Exceptional Achievement in Outreach Award in 2002. Dr. Ericsson-Jackson is also a proponent for diversifying STEM while placing emphasis on the inclusion of minority female students. Aprille Ericsson-Jackson believes the lack of internet access plays a large role in Black students access into STEM. She also believes that having access to the internet alone could provide more opportunities to the Black community Ericsson-Jackson has also campaigned for all girls to become more engaged in Math and Science as women are grossly underrepresented in STEM. She notes that girls are capable yet they are discouraged from participating in such programs As the President of the Parent Teacher Organization in her daughter’s school, Dr. Ericsson’s passion for STEAM inspired her to host hands on STEAM events for the students at her daughter’s school. Because Ericsson became a mother later in her career, she became a heavy influence on the children in her family and children in her community. Ericsson was so passionate about introducing STEM to children that she hosted a “Family Science Camp”, that included children from her family as well as children from her community, during the summer where they toured Howard University’s Dental school, attended sporting events while implementing math and science in those activities to heighten their interests in STEM. In 2022, Ericsson received the 2022 Ralph Coats Roe medal from the American Society of Mechanical Engineers (ASME), honoring her international work encouraging young people, women, and people from other underrepresented groups to pursue STEM careers.

=== Biden Administration ===
On September 28, 2023, President Joe Biden nominated Ericsson to be assistant secretary of defense for science and technology. Ericsson was confirmed by the Senate on February 28, 2024. In this role, she directs the organization responsible for the oversight of and advocacy for the Department of Defense science and technology (S&T) enterprise, including S&T workforce and laboratory infrastructure policy, Federally Funded Research and Development Centers, and University-Affiliated Research Centers.

== Awards ==
- Women in Science and Engineering Award (1997)
- NASA Goddard Honor Award (1998)
- Center of Excellence Award for the TRIMM Project (1998)
- Women's Network - Top 18 Women Who Will Change the World
- Howard University College of Engineering, Architecture, & Computer Science Alumni Excellence Award (2002)
- Elected to the Howard University Board of Trustees (2004)
- Washington Award (2016)
- National Society of Black Physicists Honor Award (2019)
- American Society of Mechanical Engineers, Ralph Coates Roe Medal (2022)
