= Laura D. Taylor-Kale =

American policy executive (born 1977)

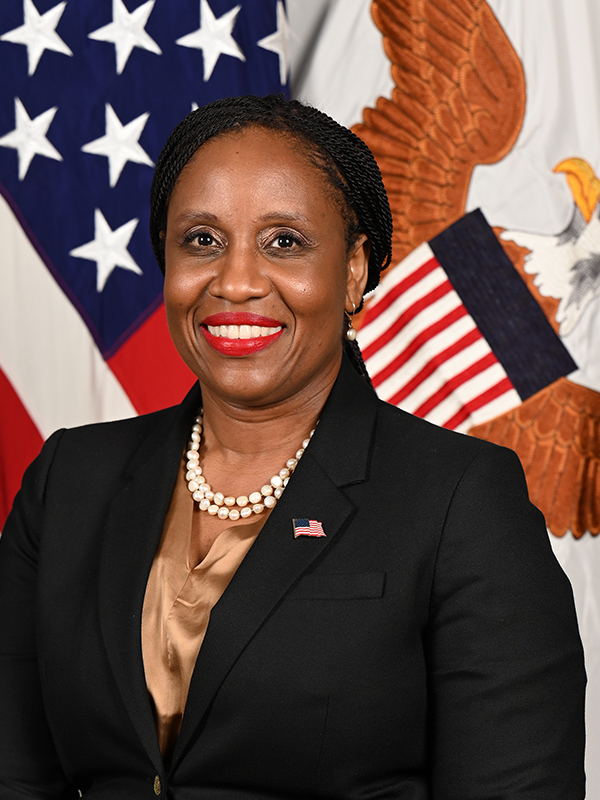

Assistant Secretary of Defense for Industrial Base Policy
- In office April 11, 2023 – January 20, 2025
- President: Joe Biden
- Preceded by: Position established
- Succeeded by: Michael Cadenazzi

Personal details
- Born: July 10, 1977 (age 49) Illinois, United States
- Education: Smith College (BA); Princeton University (MPA); New York University (MBA); Stanford University (PhD)

Laura D. Taylor-Kale (pronounced KAH-Lay) (born July 10, 1977) is an American foreign policy and economic advisor. She had served the US Assistant Secretary of Defense for Industrial Base Policy.

Taylor-Kale is the first-ever Senate-confirmed person in this role.

== Early life ==
Taylor-Kale was born and raised in Illinois to an African American mother and a Cameroonian immigrant father.

== Career ==
Taylor-Kale has worked in countries including India, Sri Lanka, Afghanistan, Senegal, Niger, Burkina Faso, Côte d’Ivoire, and Cameroon. From 2003 to 2012, Taylor-Kale was a career Foreign Service officer in the United States Department of State, where she served in India, Côte d’Ivoire, Afghanistan, the Executive Board of the World Bank and International Finance Corporation, and the Department of State Bureau of Economic and Business Affairs. From 2012-2014, she was the special assistant to the vice president for sustainable development at the World Bank.

In 2014, Taylor-Kale joined the Obama administration at the U.S. International Development Finance Corporation as the senior advisor to the president and CEO for policy and operations. From 2016 to 2017, Taylor-Kale served as the deputy assistant secretary of commerce for manufacturing at the International Trade Administration in the U.S. Department of Commerce.

From 2021 to 2023, Taylor-Kale was the Fellow for Innovation and Economic Competitiveness at the Council on Foreign Relations, where her research focuses on U.S. innovation policy, industrial policy, the future of work. She contributes to the Council's Renewing America Initiative. She is a life member of the Council on Foreign Relations.

=== Biden administration nomination ===
On May 26, 2022, President Joe Biden nominated Taylor-Kale to be the Assistant Secretary of Defense for Industrial Base Policy. Hearings on her nomination were held before the Senate Armed Services Committee on July 28, 2022. During that hearing, Senator Dan Sullivan announced he would be placing a hold on Taylor-Kale's nomination due to a disagreement with the Biden administration over a mining project in his home state of Alaska. The Senate Armed Services Committee approved Taylor-Kale's nomination in September 2022. In December 2022, Sullivan said he considered her qualified for the job but continued to block the full Senate vote. Taylor-Kale's nomination expired at the end of the year and was returned to President Biden on January 3, 2023.

President Biden re-nominated Taylor-Kale the same day. The United States Senate Committee on Armed Services favorably reported her nomination to the Senate floor on February 9, 2023. On March 21, 2023, more than 50 former officials wrote an open letter protesting Taylor-Kale's nomination holdup. On March 15, 2023, the United States Senate invoked cloture on her nomination by a 68–26 vote. On March 30, 2023, her nomination was confirmed by a 63–27 vote.

=== National Defense Industrial Strategy ===
Taylor-Kale authored the Department of Defense's first-ever National Defense Industrial Strategy (NDIS), a 59-page document identifying four long-term strategic priorities to modernize the defense industrial ecosystem. On January 11, 2024, Taylor-Kale announced its release.

On July 3, 2024, Taylor-Kale announced the publication of the NDIS Interim Implementation Report, detailing the actions taken to achieve the priorities outlined in the NDIS.

While in office, Taylor-Kale led the expansion of strategic investments in rare-earth elements, critical and strategic materials, and defense supply chain resilience. She also established the first Board of Directors for the National Defense Stockpile.

Following her departure from the Pentagon in January 2025, Taylor-Kale became a senior fellow for geoeconomics and defense at the Council on Foreign Relations and founded Strategic Capital Advisory LLC, an advisory firm working with venture capital, defense, and deep technology companies. In January 2026, Taylor-Kale appeared on CNBC to discuss U.S. efforts to reduce dependence on China for rare earths and critical minerals used in defense, noting the importance of pace, timing, and private investment in building domestic supply chains.
