= Michael Dodd (Defense) =

American official

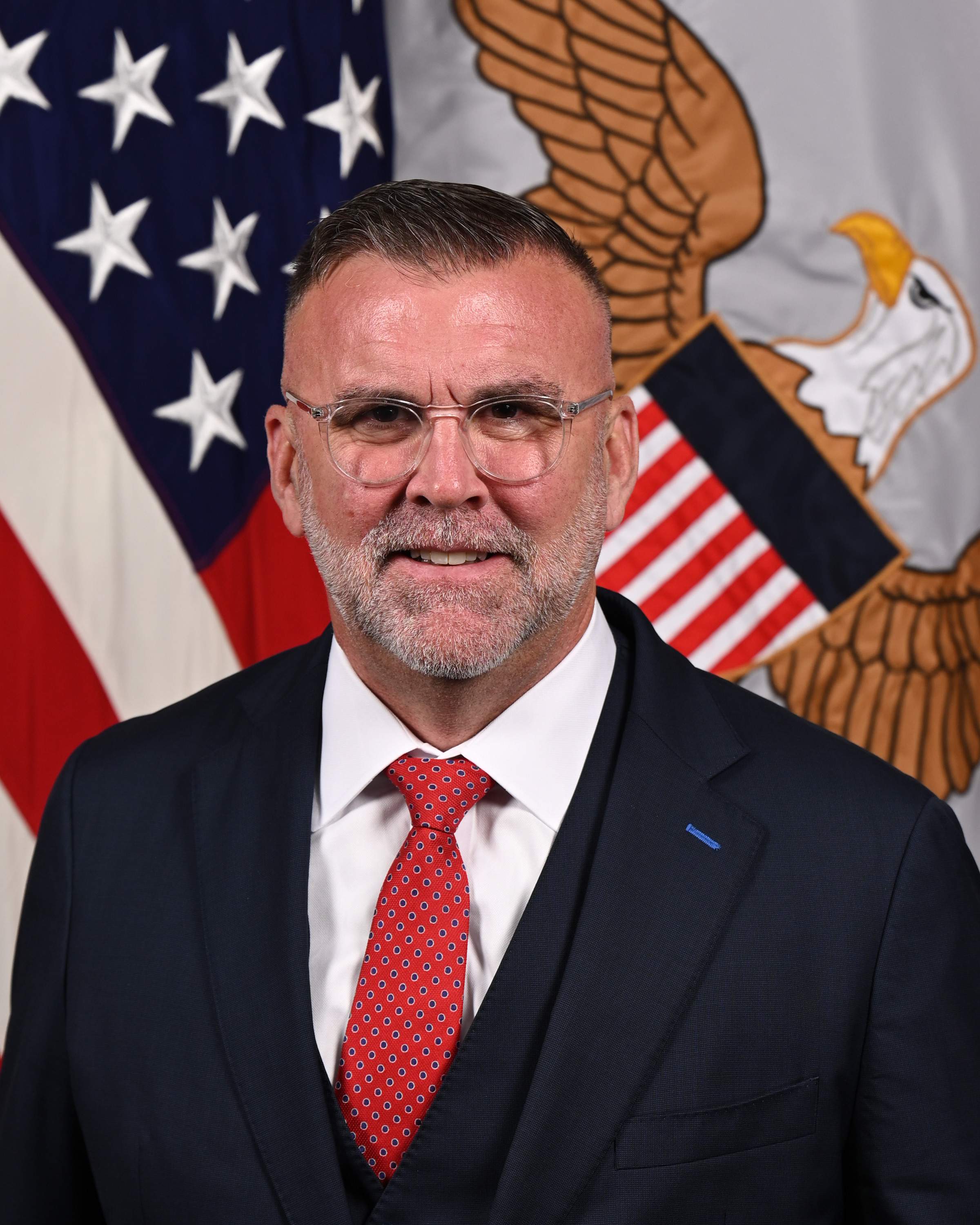
- Official portrait, 2025

Assistant Secretary of Defense for Critical Technologies
- Incumbent
- Assumed office September 24, 2025
- President: Donald Trump
- Preceded by: Position established

Personal details
- Education: Catholic University of America

Military service
- Allegiance: United States
- Branch/service: United States Marine Corps

Michael "Mike" Dodd is an American public servant who currently serves as the Assistant Secretary of Defense for Critical Technologies.

== Early life and education ==
Dodd is originally from Indiana and attended the Catholic University of America.

== Career ==
Dodd served for more than a decade in the Marine Corps. He has written extensively about defense, technologies, and investment strategies.

Dodd served in industry advising investment firms including 8VC and NSTXL.

In March 2025, Dodd was nominated by President Donald Trump to serve as Assistant Secretary of War for Critical Technologies (ASW(CT)) in the Office of the Under Secretary of War for Research and Engineering (USW(R&E)). In his confirmation hearing, Dodd stressed the importance of adequate funding for basic research programs within the Department of War. His nomination was confirmed by the Senate in September 2025. In August 2025, Dodd was also named deputy director of the Defense Innovation Unit.
