= Maynard Holliday =

Maynard Ansley Holliday
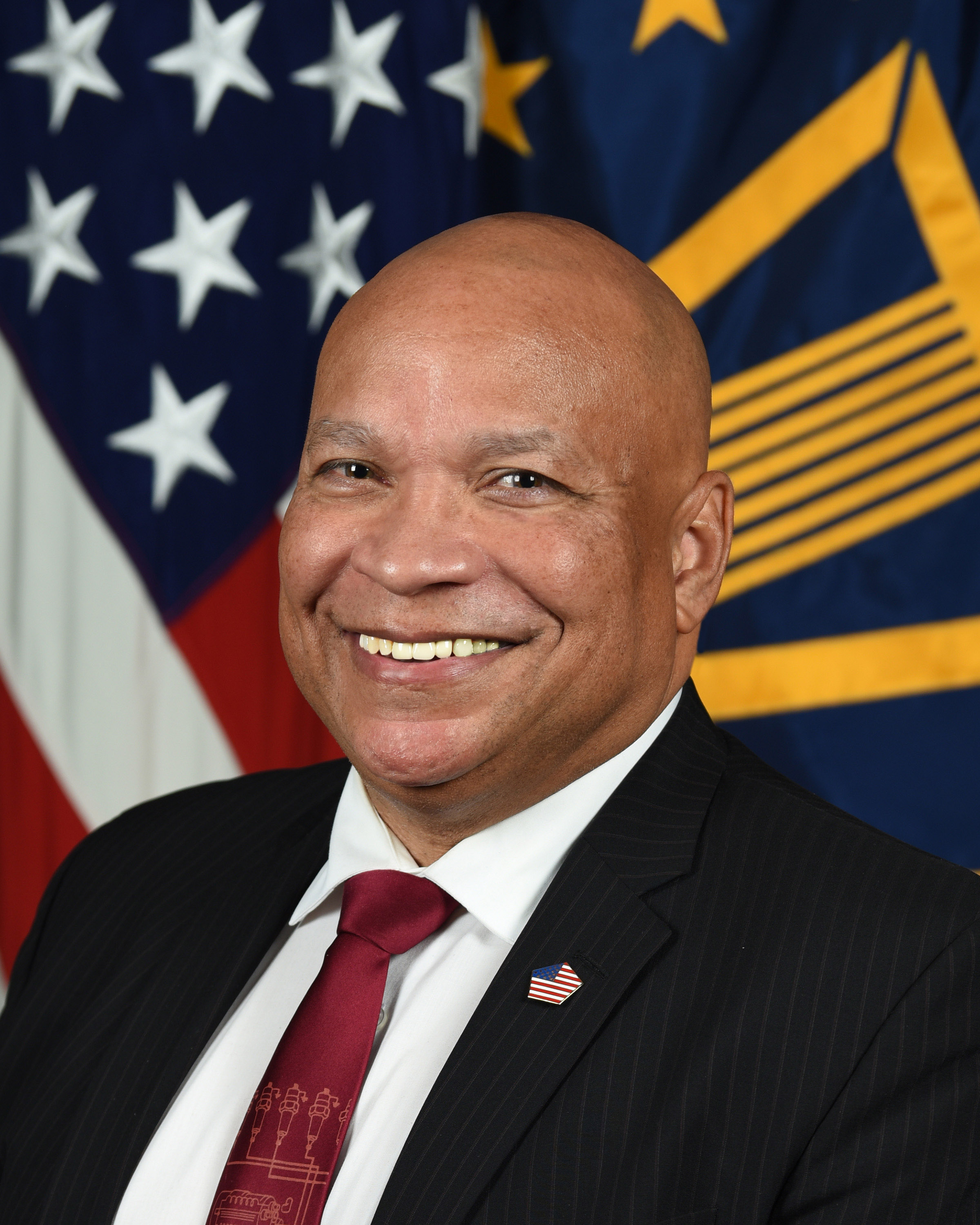
- Holliday in 2021
- Born: Providence, Rhode Island
- Education: Carnegie Mellon University (BS); Stanford University (MS)
- Scientific career
- Fields: Robotics
- Workplaces: United States Department of Defense; Sandia National Laboratories; United States Department of Energy; Lawrence Livermore National Laboratory
- Website: maynardholliday.com

Maynard Ansley Holliday was the Assistant Secretary of Defense for Critical Technologies in the Office of the Under Secretary of Defense for Research and Engineering. He previously worked under Barack Obama, during which time he launched the Defense Innovation Unit. Holliday was a Project Manager for Pioneer, a robot that helped to map the inside of the Chernobyl Nuclear Power Plant.

== Early life and education ==
Holliday was born in Providence, Rhode Island. He watched Star Trek as a child and wanted to become an astronaut. He grew up in Scarsdale, New York. Holliday studied mechanical engineering at Carnegie Mellon University, where he was one of only fifteen African American engineers in his class. During his studies, Holliday became interested in robotics, as the Three Mile Island accident resulted in the launch of a Carnegie Mellon spin-off company called RedZone Robotics, with Red Whittaker as the Chief Scientist. Holliday worked with Whittaker, designing robotic systems to explore the contaminated reactor. Holliday attended the International Space University in 1991, reaching the finals of the NASA Astronaut Corps selection process in 1994 and 1996. However, Holliday withdrew his application after the Space Shuttle Columbia disaster.

== Research and career ==
Holliday joined Lawrence Livermore National Laboratory as a robotics engineer. Holliday received a scholarship to work on robotics and international security at Stanford University and began a graduate program in mechanical engineering design. Holliday worked on the target positioning systems of the National Ignition Facility. In 1995, Holliday received an American Association for the Advancement of Science Science Engineering and Diplomacy Fellowship to work on science and technology policy at United States Agency for International Development. During his fellowship, Holliday advocated for international robotic development funding in response to the Chernobyl disaster. After his fellowship, Holliday worked for the United States Department of Energy Russia Nuclear Materials Taskforce on nuclear material security upgrade implementation in Russian nuclear cities. Holliday also worked with the Institute of Special Mechanical Programs in Ukraine on the Pioneer robot design, which designed guidance and control systems for USSR ballistic missiles. Holliday's efforts in securing tons of weapons-grade nuclear material were recognized with the Meritorious Service Medal, the DOE's highest civilian award.

Holliday served as a project manager for the Pioneer robot, which helped map the inside of the Chernobyl Nuclear Power Plant. Holliday collaborated with Whittaker's RedZone Robotics to deliver a finished robot in 1999. The robot, which cost $3 million, was designed to withstand considerably more radiation than humans could tolerate and stay inside the nuclear reactor for up to two years. The robot used the Jet Propulsion Laboratory Vision System to identify and document properties of materials inside the plant. This system became a prototype for the Mars Pathfinder.

After leaving the Energy Department, Holliday helped develop pattern recognition for Evolution Robotics. Holliday contributed to designing and developing high-definition (HD) camera systems for Intuitive Surgical's da Vinci telerobotic surgery robot. Holliday joined Sandia National Laboratories in 2011, where he worked in the Systems Analysis Group.

During Barack Obama's second term in office, Holliday was appointed as Senior Technical Advisor to the Under Secretary of Defense for Acquisition and Sustainment. Holliday helped to establish the Defense Innovation Unit Experimental (DIUx), a Department of Defense organization to accelerate government adoption of commercial technology. Holliday also served as an advisor for the Defense Science Board in 2015. Holliday was awarded the Defense Medal for Exceptional Public Service. Holliday left the Defense Department in 2017 to join RAND Corporation, where he researched autonomous vehicles.

Holliday returned to the Defense Department in 2021 as Defense Research and Engineering for Modernization Director, overseeing investment in the National Defense Strategy and identifying modernization priorities such as 5G, hypersonics, and quantum science.

=== Outreach and engagement ===
Holliday works on various projects that teach young people about science and engineering. Holliday's motto is, "You learn it, earn it, and return it". Holliday was involved with Barack Obama's My Brother's Keeper Challenge, a partnership that promoted intervention by civic leaders in the lives of young men of color. Holliday co-founded Robot Garden, a community makerspace in Livermore, California, and remains on its advisory board. In 2012, Citizen Schools named Holliday its Volunteer of the Year for his efforts at Elmhurst Community Prep school. Holliday has also taught advanced robotics classes at San Ramon Valley High School. Holliday is particularly committed to public engagement to improve diversity within science and engineering. While discussing his career in an interview with Carnegie Mellon University, he stated, "...these organizations... are doing things that affect the entire population, and it's important that there are diverse voices at the table to be able to promote those viewpoints".
