= David Ehrhart =

United States Air Force general

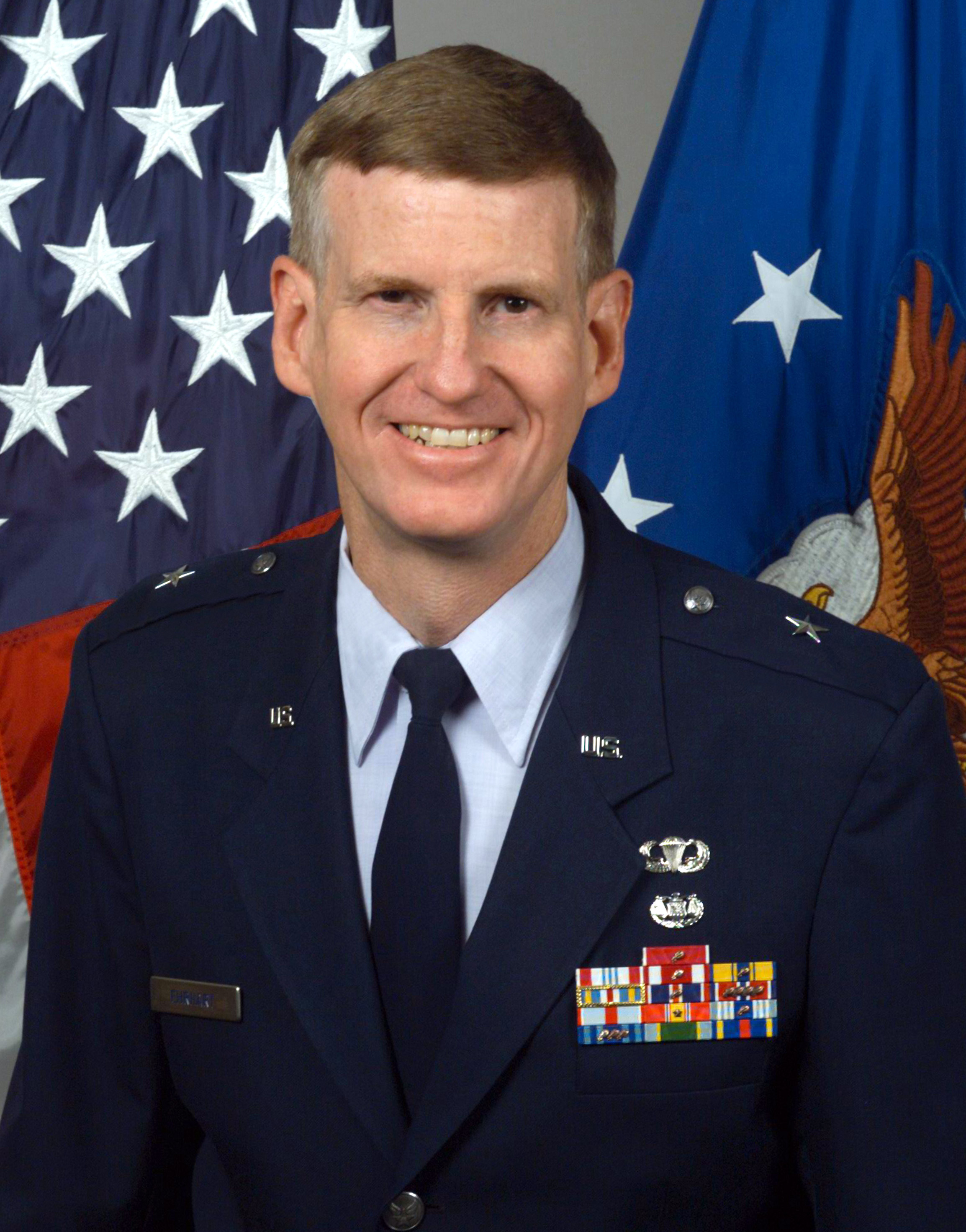

Personal details
- Born: 1953 (age 71–72) Topeka, Kansas
- Spouse: Christine L. Ehrhart
- Education: United States Air Force Academy; University of Utah; Creighton University School of Law; Air War College

Military service
- Rank: Brigadier general

David Ehrhart is a retired United States Air Force brigadier general and lawyer. In June 2017, he was nominated by President Donald Trump to become General Counsel of the Air Force. The nomination was withdrawn in September 2017.

== Biography ==
Ehrhart graduated from the United States Air Force Academy in 1975 with a Bachelor of Science degree in civil engineering. He earned a master's degree in business administration and management from the University of Utah in 1977, and a Juris Doctor, cum laude, from Creighton University School of Law in Omaha, Nebraska, in 1981. He later graduated from the Air War College in Alabama in 1994.

He served for 33 years in the United States Air Force, retiring as a brigadier general. While in the Air Force, Ehrhart completed tours as staff judge advocate for the Air Force Materiel Command's headquarters and as assistant judge advocate general for military law and operations for the Air Force's headquarters. He also served as commander of the Air Force Legal Services Agency, staff judge advocate at the Air Force's European headquarters, and commandant of the Air Force Judge Advocate General School.

Ehrhart served as associate general counsel at Lockheed Martin Aeronautics, where he was the lead attorney responsible for the F-35 program. He was previously the chief counsel of global sustainment for Lockheed Martin Aeronautics.

== Boards and Affiliations ==
In 2013, Ehrhart served as chair of the American Bar Association’s Standing Committee on Legal Assistance for Military Personnel, which supports service members, veterans, and their families in understanding and exercising their legal rights.

Ehrhart also served as the 2015–16 chair of the American Bar Association’s Section of Public Contract Law while working as associate general counsel at Lockheed Martin Aeronautics in Fort Worth, Texas.

On July 23, 2018, Ehrhart was nominated to serve as a Member of the Board of Visitors of the United States Air Force Academy for the remainder of a three-year term.

As of November 2025, Ehrhart serves on the Board of Trustees of The Air Force Judge Advocate General’s School Foundation

== Awards and Honors ==
During his Air Force career, Ehrhart received numerous honors recognizing his leadership and service within the Judge Advocate General's Corps. In 2001, he was named the recipient of the Stuart R. Reichart Award for outstanding contributions to the administration of military justice and professional excellence.

He was later recognized by Creighton University School of Law as its 2006 Alumni Merit Award recipient for his distinguished career in military law and continued service to the legal profession.
