= Secretary of Defense-Empowered Cross-Functional Teams =

Organizations within the US DoD

Secretary of Defense-Empowered Cross-Functional Teams (SECDEF CFTs) are specialized organizations within the Department of Defense, authorized by Section 911 of the 2017 National Defense Authorization Act. The SECDEF CFTs are designed to help the Department improve mission effectiveness and efficiencies, improve business operations, and help the DoD address its most-pressing readiness and modernization activities.

== Legislation ==
The secretary of defense-empowered cross-functional team concept was established under Section 911 of the 2017 National Defense Authorization Act. The provision was included in response to Congressional and Government Accountability Office (GAO) assessments which found that, while the Department of Defense maintains military forces with unparalleled capabilities, the department "continues to confront organizational and management challenges that hinder collaboration and integration across the department". As such, it was determined that CFTs could fill a key role in addressing and resolving critical objectives and other organizational outputs that span multiple functional boundaries.

The purpose of the cross-functional teams was:

1. to provide for effective collaboration and integration across organizational and functional boundaries in the Department of Defense;
2. to develop, at the direction of the Secretary, recommendations for comprehensive and fully integrated policies, strategies, plans, and resourcing decisions;
3. to make decisions on cross-functional issues, to the extent authorized by the Secretary and within parameters established by the Secretary; and
4. to provide oversight for and, as directed by the Secretary, supervise the implementation of approved policies, strategies, plans, and resourcing decisions approved by the Secretary.

== Current Cross-Functional Teams ==
Since FY17, the Secretary of Defense has chartered four cross-functional teams:

=== Algorithmic Warfare Cross Functional Team (AWCFT) ===
Established in April 2017, the AWCFT is chartered to accelerate DoD's integration of big data and machine learning. The AWCFT's objective is to turn the enormous volume of data available to DoD into actionable intelligence and insights at speed. The AWCFT will also consolidate existing algorithm-based technology initiatives related to mission areas of the Defense Intelligence Enterprise, including all initiatives that develop, employ, or field artificial intelligence, automation, machine learning, deep learning, and computer vision algorithms.

=== Personnel Vetting Transformation (PVT) ===
Established in August 2017, the PVT CFT was tasked with examining all aspects of the enterprise-wide security, suitability/fitness, and credentialing mission, including a greater alignment and integration of insider threat and adjacent missions. The PVT was disestablished in January 2019, with its duties transferred to the newly created Personnel Vetting Office in the Office of the Undersecretary of Defense for Intelligence.

=== Close Combat Lethality Task Force (CCLTF) ===
Established in February 2018, the CCLTF was tasked to " develop, evaluate, recommend, and implement improvements to U.S. squad-level infantry combat formations in order to ensure close combat overmatch against pacing threats and strengthen the combat, lethality, survivability, resiliency, and readiness of infantry squads."

=== Protecting Critical Technology Task Force (PCTTF) ===
Established in October 2018, the PCTTF was tasked with examining and identifying solutions to "ensure the integrity and security of [Department of Defense] classified information, controlled unclassified information, and key data," and to prevent the loss of intellectual property and data.

=== Electromagnetic Spectrum Operations Cross Functional Team (EMSO CFT) ===
Established in February 2019, the EMSO CFT was established specifically within Section 1053 of the 2019 National Defense Authorization Act. The EMSO CFT was tasked to "(1) establish processes and procedures to develop, integrate, and enhance the electronic warfare mission area and the conduct of joint electromagnetic spectrum operations in all domains across the Department of Defense; and (2) ensure that such processes and procedures provide for integrated defense-wide strategy, planning, and budgeting with respect to the conduct of such operations by the Department, including activities conducted to counter and deter such operations by malign actors".

The Vice Chairman of the Joint Chiefs of Staff General John E. Hyten is the Senior Designated Official (SDO) for the EMSO CFT. The Deputy Director of the EMSO CFT is Maj Gen Lance Landrum, who also serves as the Deputy Director for Requirements and Capability Development (J8) on the Joint Staff.

=== Cross-Functional Team for Joint All-Domain Command and Control (CFT for JADC2) ===
A 150-person CFT for Joint All-Domain Command and Control.

== Concept refinement ==
Under the Section 918 of the 2019 National Defense Authorization Act, Congress required the Secretary of Defense to issue criteria that differentiates the CFTs created in accordance with the FY17 NDAA section 911 from other types of working groups, committees, integrated product teams, and task forces of the DoD. In a memo dated 2 December 2019, the Secretary of Defense established the following criteria:

- Report directly to the Secretary of Defense or Deputy Secretary of Defense and are to provide routine updates directly;
- Work only on "high-priority initiatives that are not within the authority of a single DoD Component head or Office of the Secretary of Defense (OSD) Principal Staff Assistant (PSA)";
- Work on "complex problem sets where speed, end-to-end solutions, and impact are critical";
- Work on "areas where they can enrich collaboration and integration across the Department";
- Support "comprehensive and fully-integrated policies, strategies, plans, and resourcing decisions";

Additionally, the CFTs may also (when authorized or approved by the Secretary of Defense) "make decisions on cross-functional issues on [his] behalf" and "supervise the implementation of policies, strategies, plans, and resourcing decisions."

== See also ==
- cross-functional team
- National Defense Authorization Act
- United States Department of Defense
- Organizational structure of the United States Department of Defense
