= Laurie Buckhout =

American politician (born 1961)

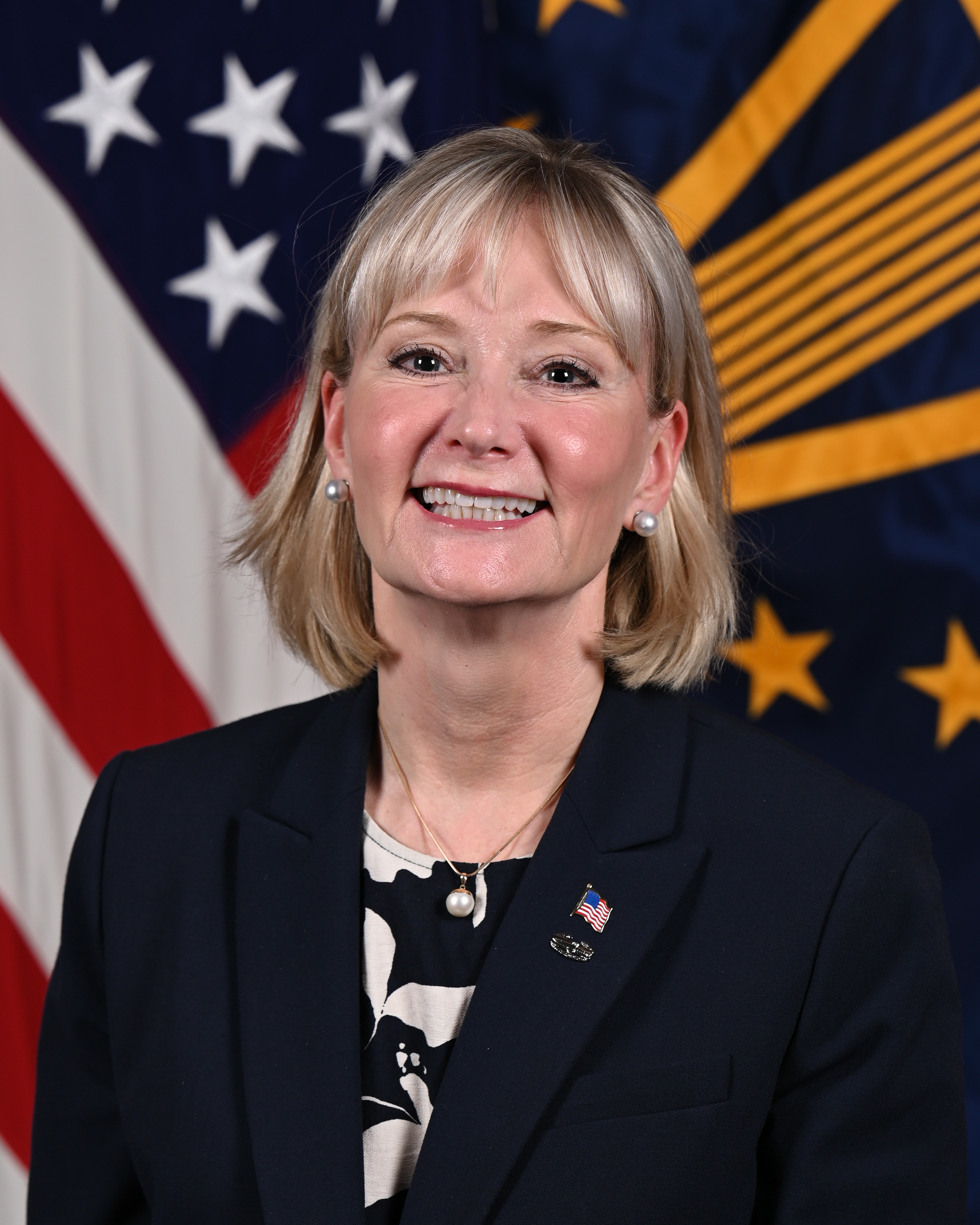
- Official portrait, 2025

Assistant Secretary of Defense for Cyber Policy
- Acting
- In office March 17, 2025 – September 5, 2025
- President: Donald Trump
- Preceded by: Ashley Manning (acting)
- Succeeded by: Austin Dahmer (acting)

Personal details
- Born: Laurie Gaye Moe; 1961 (age 64–65) Virginia, U.S.
- Party: Republican
- Spouse: Paul Buckhout
- Children: 2
- Education: James Madison University (BS); Army University (MMAS); Webster University (MS)
- Website: Campaign website

Military service
- Branch/service: United States Army
- Years of service: 1984–2010
- Rank: Colonel
- Battles/wars: Gulf War; Iraq War

Laurie Moe Buckhout (born 1961) is an American politician and retired military officer. She served as Assistant Secretary of Defense for Cyber Policy in 2025. Buckhout was the Republican nominee in the 2026 election in North Carolina's 1st congressional district, having previously been their nominee for the same district in 2024.

== Early life ==
Buckhout was born and raised in the Shenandoah region of Virginia. She earned a bachelor's degree from James Madison University. She later earned a master's degree in information management from Webster University.

== Career ==
=== Military ===
Buckhout served in the United States Army for 26 years, including serving in the Gulf War. In 2003, she commanded an 800-person battalion task force in Iraq. She retired as a colonel in 2010.

=== Consulting ===
Following her retirement from the Army, Buckhout founded Corvus Consulting, a Virginia-based consulting company which specializes in electronic warfare and cyberspace operations. In 2019, she sold the company for $9 million. She moved to North Carolina in 2021.

=== Congressional campaigns ===
==== 2024 ====
Buckhout was the Republican nominee for North Carolina's 1st congressional district in 2024, narrowly losing to incumbent Don Davis. In 2025, she said she experienced health issues during the campaign and did not expect to run for office again.

==== 2026 ====
In December 2025, following redistricting that made the district more favorable to Republicans, she announced she would be running again in 2026 for Congress, saying her health had improved. She received the endorsement and funding of Leading the Future super PAC backed by Andreessen Horowitz and OpenAI. In March 2026, she won the Republican primary. She was endorsed by President Donald Trump.

On August 31, 2026, Kalshi said it had fined Buckhout $2,589.96 and banned her from using its platform for three years after she used the prediction market website to bet on her own chances of winning the general election. Buckhout said "I bet on myself. Literally. It was a dumb mistake, and as soon as I learned there was an issue, I worked to make it right. Safe to say my career as a Kalshi trader was short-lived."

=== Department of Defense ===
She was appointed to serve in the Second Trump administration in the United States Department of Defense as the acting Assistant Secretary of Defense for Cyber Policy from March to September 2025.

== Personal life ==
She is married to Paul Buckhout and has two children. They live in Edenton, North Carolina.

On August 8, 2017, Buckhout was charged with a DUI in Richmond County, Georgia. She pleaded guilty to reckless driving on October 8, 2019, and was ordered to pay a $500 fine.
