= Austin Dahmer =

American official

Austin J. Dahmer
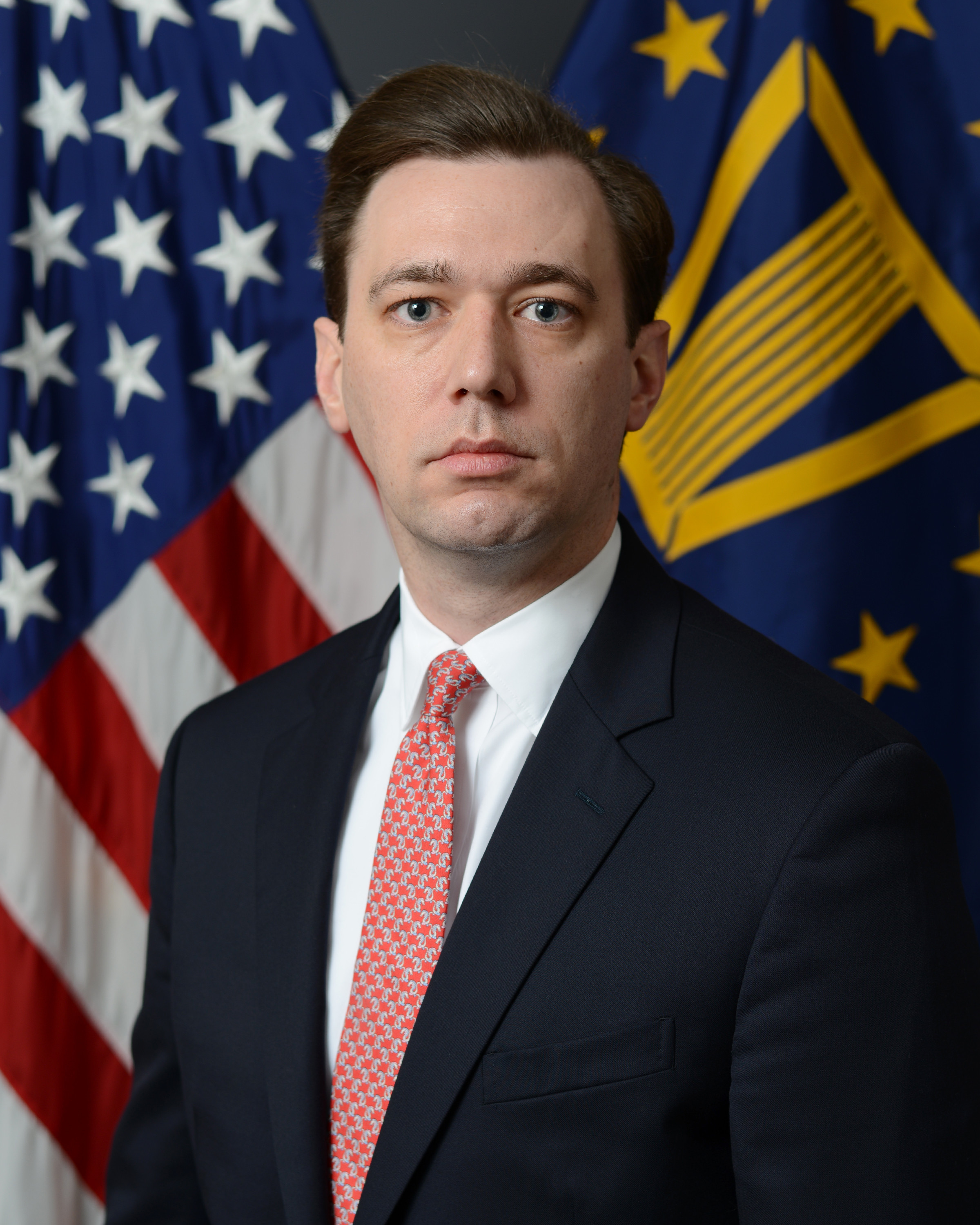
- Official portrait, 2025

Acting Deputy Under Secretary of Defense for Policy
- Incumbent
- Assumed office March 17, 2025
- President: Donald Trump
- Preceded by: Amanda J. Dory (Acting)

Acting Assistant Secretary of Defense for Cyber Policy
- In office September 5, 2025 – September 24, 2025
- President: Donald Trump
- Preceded by: Laurie Buckhout (Acting)
- Succeeded by: Katherine Sutton

Acting Assistant Secretary of Defense for Strategy, Plans, and Capabilities
- In office January 22, 2025 – March 17, 2025
- President: Donald Trump
- Preceded by: Madeline Mortelmans (Acting)
- Succeeded by: Madeline Mortelmans (Acting)

Personal details
- Education: United States Naval Academy

Military service
- Allegiance: United States
- Branch/service: United States Marine Corps
- Years of service: 2014-2019
- Rank: Captain

Austin Dahmer is an American official of the United States Department of Defense. As of 2025, he is performing the duties of Deputy Under Secretary of Defense for Policy and has addressed the Senate Armed Services Committee, which is considering his confirmation as Assistant Secretary of Defense for Strategy, Plans, and Capabilities on 4 November 2025.

== Education ==
Dahmer graduated the US Naval Academy with merit in 2014, with a bachelor's degree majoring in political science and economics.
