= Assistant Secretary of Defense for Cyber Policy =

U.S. Department of Defense official

- Flag of an Assistant Secretary of Defense

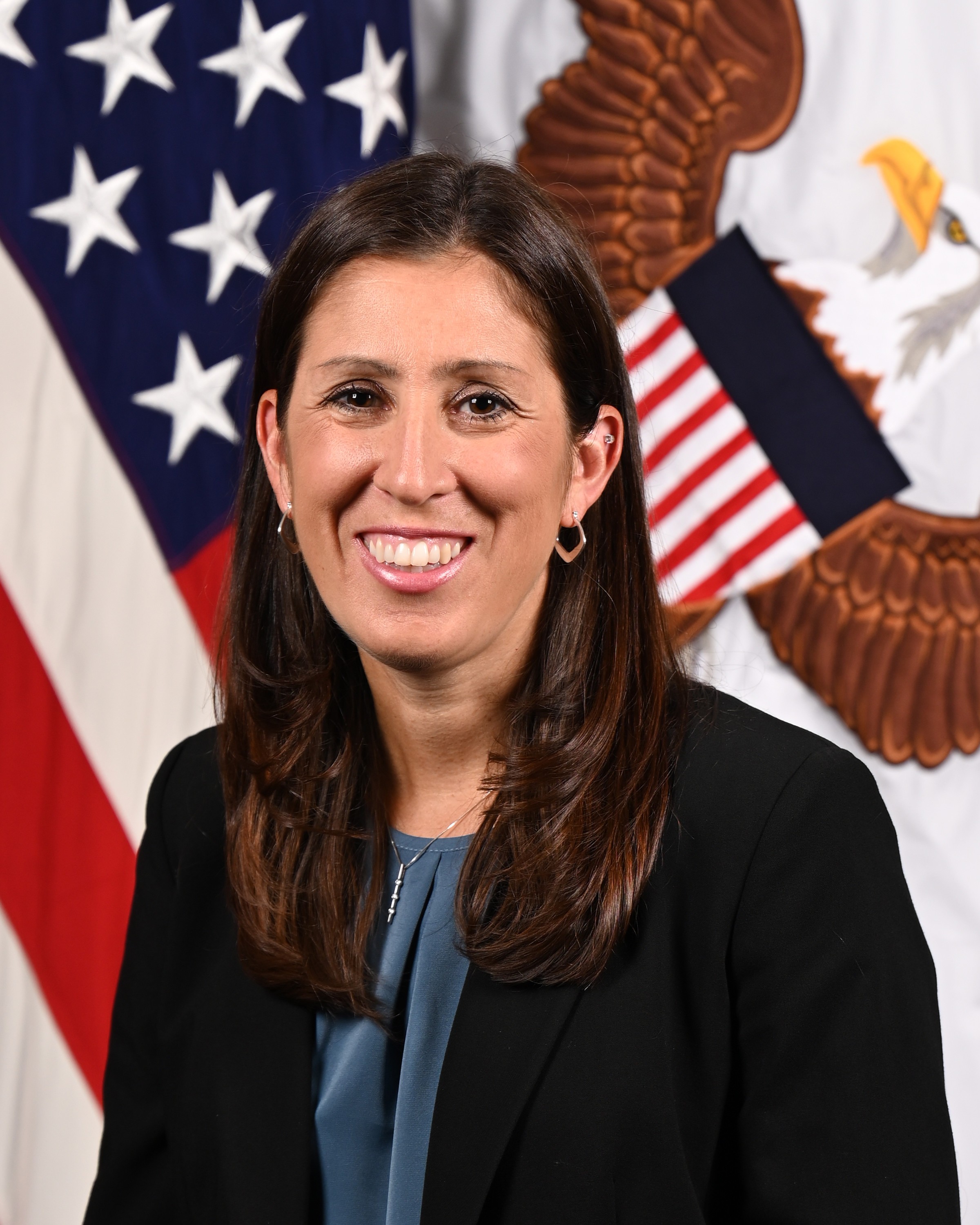
- Incumbent; Katherine Sutton since September 24, 2025
- United States Department of Defense
- Abbreviation: ASD(CP)
- Reports to: Under Secretary of Defense for Policy
- Appointer: The president with Senate advice and consent
- Term length: Appointed
- Formation: March 29, 2024
- First holder: Michael Sulmeyer
- Salary: Executive Schedule
- Website: Official website

The assistant secretary of defense for cyber policy (ASD (CP)) is a position in the United States Department of Defense responsible for the overall supervision of DoD policy for cyber warfighting. The officeholder reports to the Under Secretary of Defense for Policy.

== List of assistant secretaries of defense for cyber policy ==
No.	Assistant Secretary		Term			Ref.
No.	Portrait	Name	Took office	Left office	Term length	Ref.
Assistant Secretary of Defense for Cyber Policy
-	Ashley Manning	Ashley Manning; Acting	March 29, 2024	August 6, 2024	130 days	-
1	Michael Sulmeyer	Michael Sulmeyer	August 6, 2024	January 20, 2025	167 days	
-	Ashley Manning	Ashley Manning; Acting	January 20, 2025	March 17, 2025	56 days	
-	Laurie Buckhout	Laurie Buckhout; Acting	March 17, 2025	September 5, 2025	172 days	-
-	Austin Dahmer	Austin Dahmer; Acting	September 5, 2025	September 24, 2025	19 days	-
2	Katherine Sutton	Katherine Sutton	September 24, 2025	Incumbent	347 days	-
