= Assistant Secretary of Defense for International Armaments Cooperation =

U.S. Department of Defense official

Assistant Secretary of International Armaments Cooperation

- Flag of an assistant secretary of defense

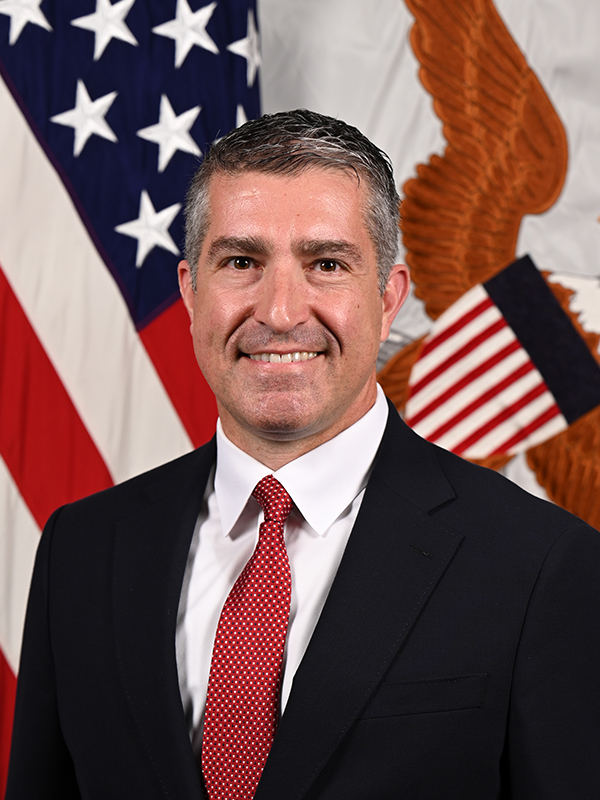
- Incumbent; Michael Cadenazzi; Acting since December 23, 2025
- United States Department of Defense
- Abbreviation: ASD (IAC)
- Reports to: Under Secretary of Defense for Acquisition and Sustainment
- Appointer: The president with Senate advice and consent
- Term length: Appointed
- Formation: December 23, 2025
- Salary: Executive Schedule
- Website: Official website

The assistant secretary of defense for international armaments cooperation (ASD (IAC)) is a position in the United States Department of Defense responsible for the overall supervision of international armaments cooperation. The officeholder is the principal advisor to the under secretary of defense for acquisition and sustainment.

== List of assistant secretaries of defense for industrial base policy ==
No.	Assistant Secretary		Term			Ref.
No.	Portrait	Name	Took office	Left office	Term length	Ref.
Assistant Secretary of Defense for Industrial Base Policy
-	Michael Cadenazzi	Michael Cadenazzi (born 1973); Acting	December 23, 2025	Incumbent	257 days	-
