= Assistant Secretary of Defense for Critical Technologies =

U.S. Department of Defense official

Assistant Secretary of Defense for Critical Technology
- Flag of an assistant secretary of defense

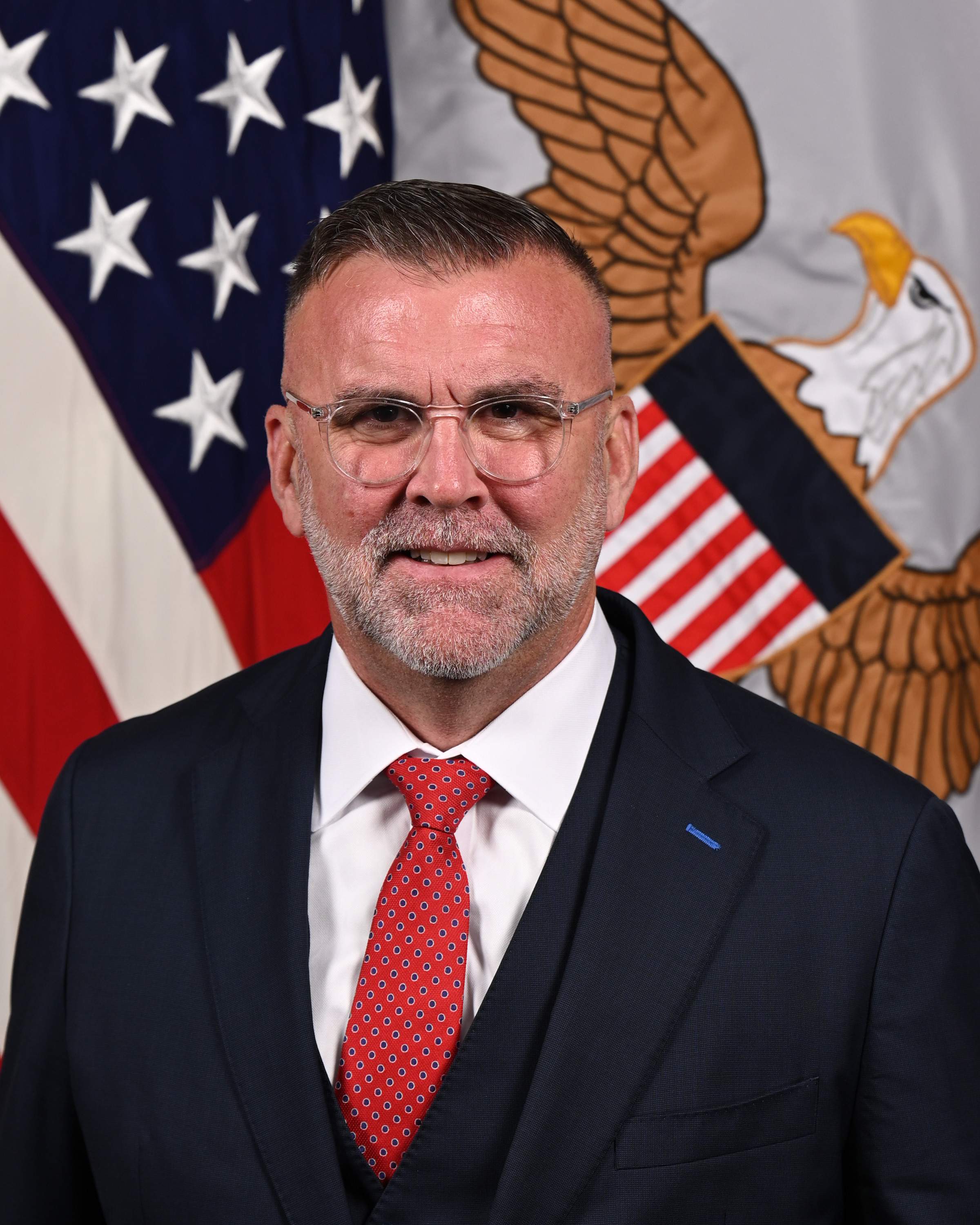
- Incumbent; Michael Dodd since September 24, 2025
- United States Department of Defense
- Abbreviation: ASD(CT)
- Reports to: Under Secretary of Defense for Research and Engineering
- Appointer: The president with Senate advice and consent
- Term length: Appointed
- Formation: July 24, 2023
- First holder: Michael Dodd
- Salary: Executive Schedule
- Website: Official website

The assistant secretary of defense for critical and technology (ASD(CT)) is a position in the United States Department of Defense responsible for the overall supervision of science and technology is the principal advisor to the under secretary of defense for research and engineering.

== List of assistant secretaries of defense for critical technology ==
No.	Assistant Secretary		Term			Ref.
No.	Portrait	Name	Took office	Left office	Term length	Ref.
Assistant Secretary of Defense for Industrial Base Policy
-	Maynard Holliday	Maynard Holliday; Acting	July 24, 2023	December 20, 2024	1 year, 149 days	-
-	Peter Highnam	Peter Highnam; Acting	December 20, 2024	September 24, 2025	278 days	
1	Michael Dodd	Michael Dodd	September 24, 2025	Incumbent	347 days	
