= National Defense Authorization Act for Fiscal Year 2011 =

Ike Skelton National Defense Authorization Act for Fiscal Year 2011
- Long title: An Act to authorize appropriations for fiscal year 2011 for military activities of the Department of Defense, for military construction, and for defense activities of the Department of Energy, to prescribe military personnel strengths for such fiscal year, and for other purposes.
- Enacted by: the 111th United States Congress

Citations
- Public law: Pub. L. 111–383 (text) (PDF)
- Statutes at Large: 124 Stat. 4137 through 124 Stat. 4519

Legislative history
- Introduced in the House as (H.R. 6523) by Ike Skelton (D–MO) on December 15, 2010; Committee consideration by House Armed Services Committee; Passed the House on December 17, 2010 (341–48); Passed the Senate on December 22, 2010; Signed into law by President Barack Obama on January 7, 2011

The Ike Skelton National Defense Authorization Act for Fiscal Year 2011 (H.R. 6523, Pub. L. 111–383 (text) (PDF)), is a law in the United States signed by President Barack Obama on January 7, 2011. As a bill it was originally H.R. 5136 in the 111th Congress and later co-sponsored by Representative Ike Skelton as H.R. 6523 and renamed. The overall purpose of the law is to authorize funding for the defense of the United States and its interests abroad, for military construction, and for national security-related energy programs.

Commitments includes setting aside $205 million for the Iron Dome short-range rocket defense system for the State of Israel. Section 806 dealt with supply chain risk management, allowing restrictions on information made available under relevant procurement exercises where requirements for the protection of national security applied.

== See also ==
- National Defense Authorization Act
- National Defense Authorization Act for Fiscal Year 2012
