= Assistant Secretary of Defense for Science and Technology =

U.S. Department of Defense official

- Flag of an assistant secretary of defense

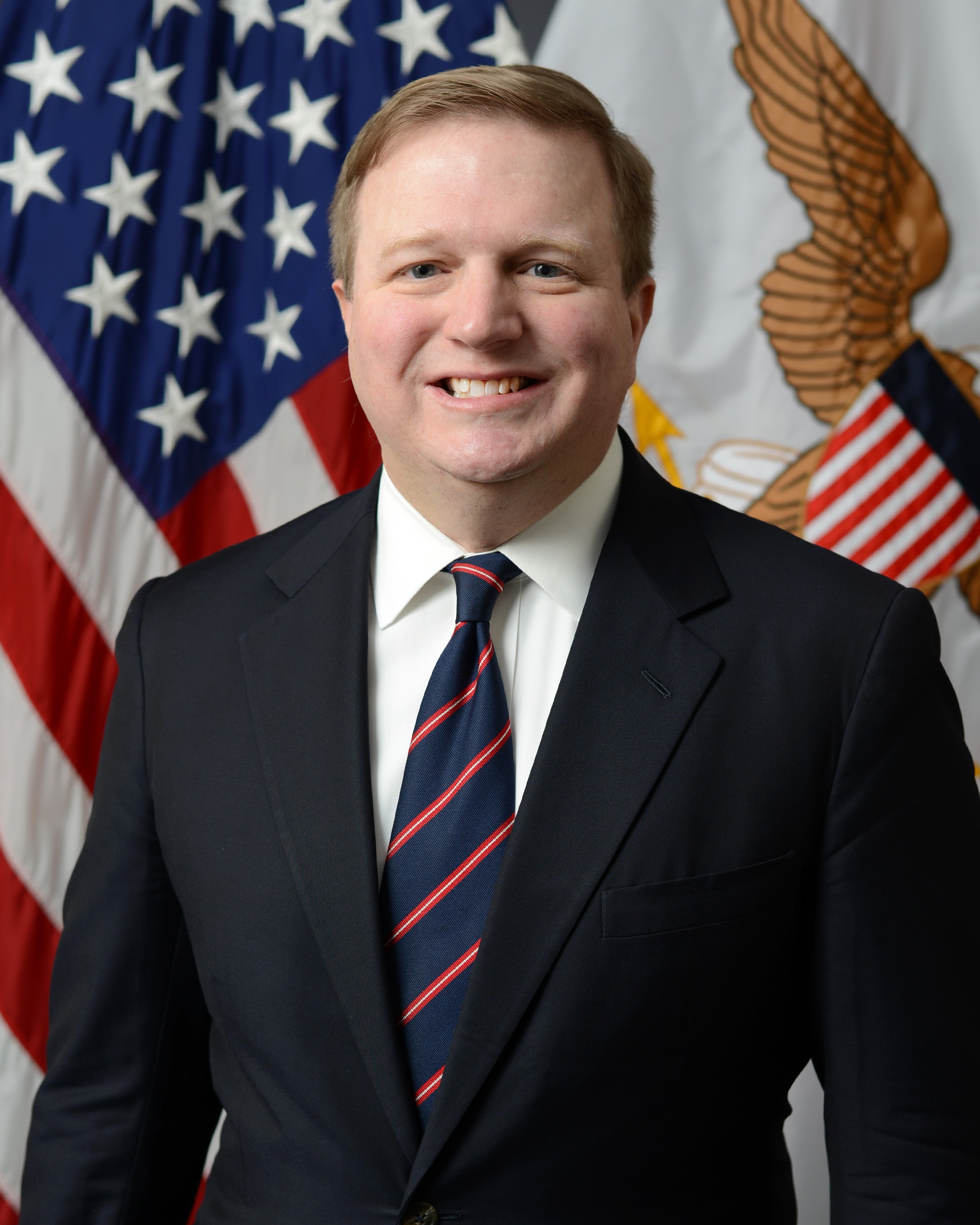
- Incumbent; Joseph S. Jewell since December 23, 2025
- United States Department of Defense
- Abbreviation: ASD (S&T)
- Reports to: Under Secretary of Defense for Research and Engineering
- Appointer: The president with Senate advice and consent
- Term length: Appointed
- Formation: July 24, 2023
- First holder: Aprille Ericsson
- Salary: Executive Schedule
- Website: Official website

The assistant secretary of defense for science and technology (ASD (S&T)) is a position in the United States Department of Defense responsible for the overall supervision of science and technology is the principal advisor to the under secretary of defense for research and engineering.

== List of assistant secretaries of defense for science and technology ==
No.	Assistant Secretary		Term			Ref.
No.	Portrait	Name	Took office	Left office	Term length	Ref.
Assistant Secretary of Defense for Science and Technology
-	Steven Wax	Steven Wax; Acting	July 24, 2023	March 29, 2024	249 days	-
1	Aprille Ericsson	Aprille Ericsson (born 1963)	March 29, 2024	January 20, 2025	297 days	
-	Michael J. Holthe	Michael J. Holthe; Acting	January 20, 2025	December 1, 2025	315 days	
-	Jacob Glassman	Jacob Glassman; Acting	December 1, 2025	December 23, 2025	22 days	-
2	Joseph S. Jewell	Joseph S. Jewell	December 23, 2025	Incumbent	257 days	-
