= Assistant Secretary of Defense for Mission Capabilities =

U.S. Department of Defense official

- Flag of an assistant secretary of defense

- Incumbent; Jeremy Verbout; Acting since May 11, 2026
- United States Department of Defense
- Abbreviation: ASD(M&C)
- Reports to: Under Secretary of Defense for Research and Engineering
- Appointer: The president; with Senate advice and consent
- Term length: Appointed
- Formation: July 24, 2023
- First holder: James Caggy
- Salary: Executive Schedule
- Website: Official website

The assistant secretary of defense for mission capabilities (ASD(MC)) is a position in the United States Department of Defense responsible for the overall supervision of mission capabilities, prototype testing, and the demonstration of "multi-domain" concepts. The officeholder is the principal advisor to the under secretary of defense for research and engineering.

The position was created in 2023, under the leadership of Defense Secretary Lloyd Austin.

In July 2025, President Donald Trump nominated James Caggy to the position.

== List of assistant secretaries of defense for mission capabilities ==
No.	Assistant Secretary		Term			Ref.
No.	Portrait	Name	Took office	Left office	Term length	Ref.
Assistant Secretary of Defense for Industrial Base Policy
-	Thomas J. Browning	Thomas J. Browning; Acting	July 24, 2023	January 20, 2025	1 year, 180 days	
-	Marcia Holmes	Marcia Holmes; Acting	January 20, 2025	September 29, 2025	252 days	
-	Alex Lovett	Alex Lovett; Acting	September 29, 2025	December 29, 2025	91 days	-
1	James Caggy	James Caggy	December 29, 2025	May 11, 2026	133 days	-
-	Jeremy Verbout	Jeremy Verbout; Acting	May 11, 2026	Incumbent	158 days	-
