= Assistant Secretary of Defense for Industrial Base Policy =

U.S. Department of Defense official

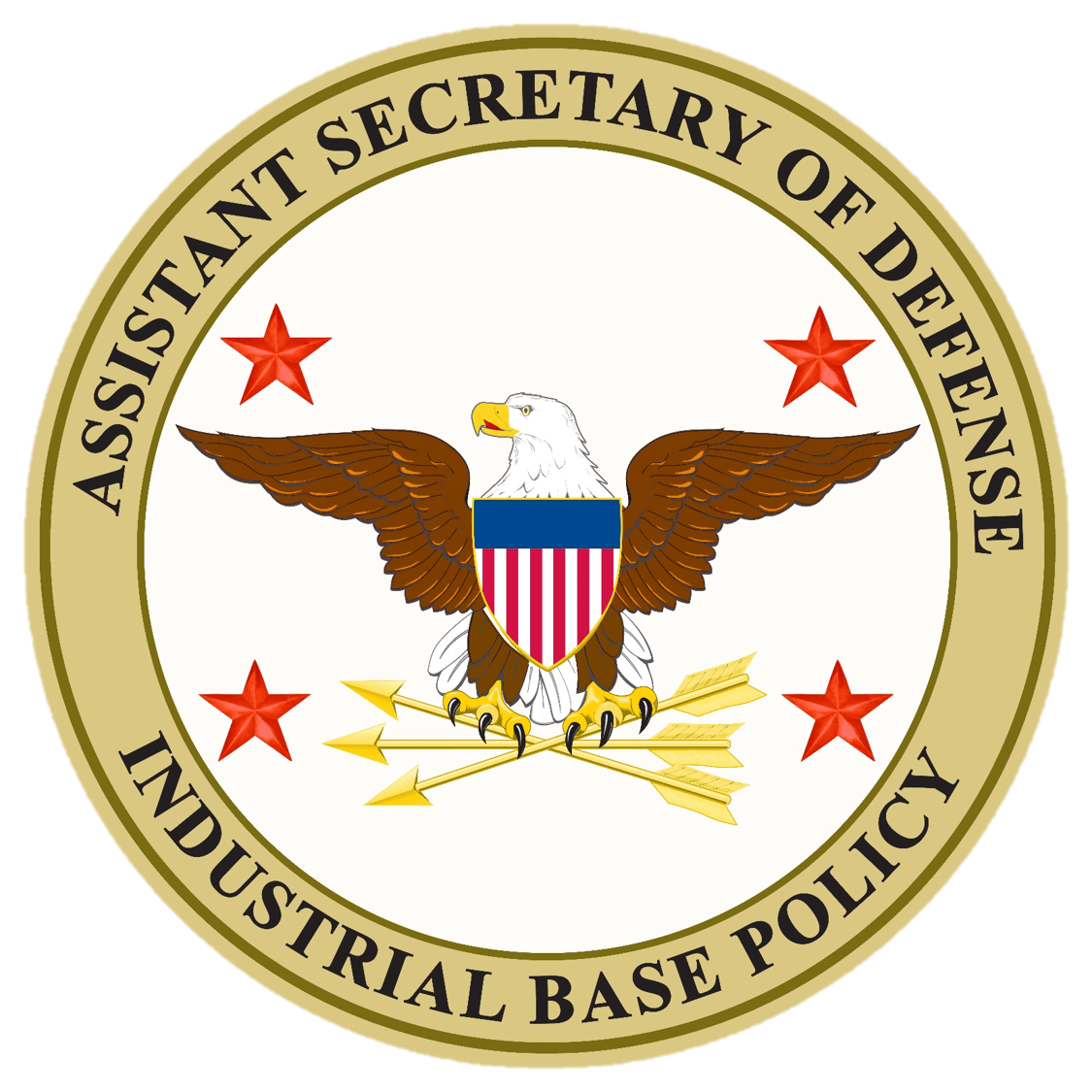
- Emblem of the assistant secretary of defense for industrial base policy

- Flag of an assistant secretary of defense

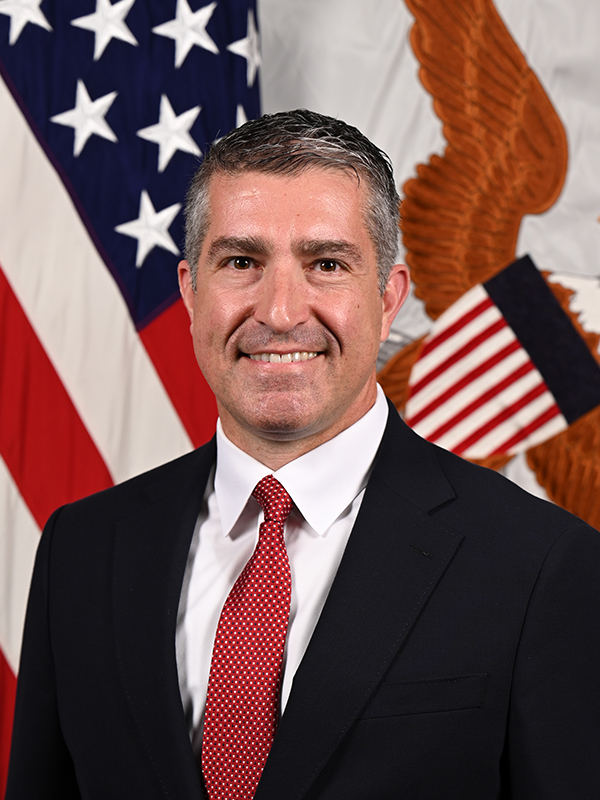
- Incumbent; Michael Cadenazzi since September 23, 2025
- United States Department of Defense
- Abbreviation: ASD (IBP)
- Reports to: Under Secretary of Defense for Acquisition and Sustainment
- Appointer: The president; with Senate advice and consent
- Term length: Appointed
- Formation: December 8, 2021
- First holder: Laura D. Taylor-Kale (first senate-confirmed position holder)
- Salary: Executive Schedule
- Website: Official website

The assistant secretary of defense for industrial base policy (ASD (IBP)) is a position in the United States Department of Defense responsible for the overall supervision of industrial base policy. The officeholder is the principal advisor to the under secretary of defense for acquisition and sustainment.

The position was formally established by congress in 2021 with the goal of building a more resilient defense industrial base.

== Organization ==
Organizations reporting to the Assistant Secretary of Defense for Industrial Base Policy include:

- Principal Deputy Assistant Secretary of Defense for Industrial Base Policy
- Deputy Assistant Secretary of Defense for Industrial Base Resilience
- Deputy Assistant Secretary of Defense for International and Industry Engagement
- Principal Director for Global Investment and Economic Security
- Office of Small Business Programs

== List of assistant secretaries of defense for industrial base policy ==
No.	Assistant Secretary		Term			Ref.
No.	Portrait	Name	Took office	Left office	Term length	Ref.
Assistant Secretary of Defense for Industrial Base Policy
-	Deborah Rosenblum	Deborah Rosenblum (born 1962); Acting	December 8, 2021	April 11, 2023	1 year, 124 days	
1	Laura D. Taylor-Kale	Laura D. Taylor-Kale (born 1977)	April 11, 2023	January 20, 2025	1 year, 284 days	
-	Vic S. Ramdass	Vic S. Ramdass; Acting	January 20, 2025	September 23, 2025	246 days	
2	Michael Cadenazzi	Michael Cadenazzi (born 1973)	September 23, 2025	Incumbent	354 days	
