= List of components of the U.S. Department of Defense =

List of military components of the U.S. Defense Department

Department of Defense
Commander-in-Chief:	President of the United States, Donald Trump
Secretary of Defense:	Pete Hegseth
Chairman of the Joint Chiefs of Staff:	General Dan Caine, USAF
Military budget:	$718 billion (2018)
Employees:	700,000 civilian 2.8 million military (2008)

The chain of command of the U.S. Department of Defense (DoD) goes from the president (as commander-in-chief) through the secretary of defense down to the newest recruits. The Department of Defense oversees a complex structure of joint command and control functions.These are split generally into administrative and operational chains of command.The following are the Major Components of the United States Department of Defense (Secondarily named the Department of War).

== Office of the Secretary of Defense ==
Secretary of Defense

- Deputy Secretary of Defense
- Office of the Under Secretary of Defense (Comptroller)/Chief Financial Officer of the Department of Defense (USD-C) (CFO-DOD)
  - Deputy Under Secretary of Defense (Comptroller)
  - Deputy Comptroller for Program Budget (PB)
  - Director, Defense Contract Audit Agency (DCAA)
  - Director, Defense Finance and Accounting Service (DFAS)
  - Deputy Comptroller for Enterprise Financial Transformation (EFT)
  - Deputy Comptroller for Budget and Appropriations Affairs (BAA)
  - Deputy Chief Financial Officer (DCFO)
  - Assistant Deputy Chief Financial Officer (ADCFO)
  - Director, Human Capital and Resource Management (HCRM)

Source: OUSD-C Leadership

- Office of the Under Secretary of Defense for Acquisition and Sustainment (OUSD-A&S)
  - Deputy Under Secretary of Defense for Acquisition and Sustainment
  - Office of the Assistant Secretary of Defense for Acquisition (OASD-A)
    - Defense Acquisition University (DAU)
    - Defense Contract Management Agency (DCMA)
  - Office of the Assistant Secretary of Defense for Sustainment (OASD-S)
    - Defense Logistics Agency (DLA)
    - Defense Microelectronics Activity (DMEA)
  - Office of the Assistant Secretary of Defense for Energy, Installations, and Environment (OUSD-EI&E)
    - Office of Local Defense Community Cooperation (OLDCC)
  - Office of the Assistant Secretary of Defense for Nuclear Deterrence, Chemical, and Biological Defense Policy and Programs (OASD-ND-CBD)
    - Defense Threat Reduction Agency (DTRA)
  - Office of the Assistant Secretary of Defense for Industrial Base Policy (OASD-IBP)

Source: OUSD A&S Organizations

- Office of the Under Secretary of Defense for Personnel and Readiness (OUSD-P&R)
  - Deputy Under Secretary of Defense for Personnel and Readiness
  - Office of the Assistant Secretary of Defense for Health Affairs (ASD-HA)
    - Health Services Policy and Oversight
    - Health Readiness Policy and Oversight
    - Health Resources Management and Policy
    - Defense Health Agency
      - Military Health System
        - TRICARE Management Activity
    - Uniformed Services University of the Health Sciences
      - Armed Forces Radiobiology Research Institute (AFRRI)
  - Office of the Assistant Secretary of Defense (Manpower and Reserve Affairs) (OASD-M&RA)
    - Deputy Assistant Secretary of Defense for Civilian Personnel Policy
    - Deputy Assistant Secretary of Defense for Military Personnel Policy
      - United States Military Entrance Processing Command (USMEPCOM)
    - Deputy Assistant Secretary of Defense for Military Community and Family Policy
    - Reserve Integration
    - Defense Commissary Agency
    - Department of Defense Education Activity
      - Department of Defense Dependents Schools
  - Office of the Assistant Secretary of Defense for Readiness (ASD-R)
    - Deputy Assistant Secretary of Defense for Readiness
    - Force Readiness (FR)
    - Force Education and Training (FE&T)
    - Force Safety and Occupational Health (FSOH)
  - Defense Human Resources Activity (DHRA)
    - Equal Employment Opportunity
    - Facilities and Security
    - Office of the General Counsel
    - Ombudsman
    - Office of Small Business Programs
    - Strategic Plans and Initiatives
    - Comptroller
    - Human Resources
    - Defense Civilian Personnel Advisory Service (DCPAS)
    - Defense Equal Opportunity Management Institute (DEOMI)
    - Defense Manpower Data Center (DMDC)
    - Defense Personnel Analytics Center (DPAC)
      - Office of People Analytics (OPA)
        - Joint Advertising Marketing Research & Studies (JAMRS)
      - DoD Office of the Actuary
  - Defense Support Services Center (DSSC)
    - Advanced Distributed Learning (ADL)
    - Combating Trafficking in Persons (CTIP)
    - Computer/Electronic Accommodations Program (CAP)
    - Defense Activity for Non-Traditional Education Support (DANTES)
    - Defense Language and National Security Education Office (DLNSEO)
      - Defense Language Institute (DLI)
    - Defense Travel Management Office (DTMO)
    - Employer Support of the Guard and Reserve (ESGR)
    - Federal Voting Assistance Program (FVAP)
    - Investigations and Resolutions Directorate (IRD)
    - Military-Civilian Transition Office (MCTO)
- Office of Force Resiliency (OFR)
  - Defense Suicide Prevention Office (DSPO)
  - Office for Civil Rights and Equal Opportunity Policy (OCREOP)
  - Sexual Assault Prevention and Response Office (SAPRO)
  - Office of Command Climate and Well-Being Integration (OCCWI)
  - Drug Demand Reduction Program (DDRP)
- Office of the executive director (OXD)
  - DoD/VA Collaboration Office

Source: Organization: Office of the Under Secretary of Defense for Personnel and Readiness

- Office of the Under Secretary of Defense for Policy (OUSD-P)
  - Principal Deputy Under Secretary of Defense for Policy
  - Defense Technology Security Administration (DTSA)
  - Defense Security Cooperation Agency (DSCA)
  - Defense POW/MIA Accounting Agency (DPAA)
  - Office of the Assistant Secretary of Defense for Cyber Policy (ASD-CP)
  - Office of the Assistant Secretary of Defense for Homeland Defense and Hemispheric Affairs (ASD-HD&HA)
  - Office of the Assistant Secretary of Defense for Indo-Pacific Security Affairs (ASD-IPSA)
  - Office of the Assistant Secretary of Defense for International Security Affairs (ASD-ISA)
  - Office of the Assistant Secretary of Defense for Nuclear Deterrence, Chemical, and Biological Defense Policy and Programs (ASD-ND-CBD)
    - Defense Threat Reduction Agency (DTRA)
  - Office of the Assistant Secretary of Defense for Space Policy (ASD-SP)
  - Office of the Assistant Secretary of Defense for Special Operations and Low-Intensity Conflict (ASD-SO/LIC)
  - Office of the Assistant Secretary of Defense for Strategy, Plans, and Capabilities (ASD-SPC)
  - Defense Policy Board (DPB)
  - Civilian Harm Mitigation and Response (CHMR)

Source: Under Secretary of Defense for Policy

- Office of the Under Secretary of Defense for Intelligence and Security (OUSD-I&S)
  - Defense Intelligence (Warfighter Support)
  - Defense Intelligence (Counterintelligence, Law Enforcement & Security)
  - Defense Intelligence (Collection & Special Programs)
  - Defense Intelligence (Intelligence & Security Programs & Resources)
  - Defense Intelligence Agency (DIA)
  - National Reconnaissance Office (NRO)
  - National Security Agency (NSA)
  - National Geospatial-Intelligence Agency (NGA)

Sources: Office of the Under Secretary of Defense for Intelligence & Security and Under Secretary of Defense for Intelligence and Security.

- Office of the Under Secretary of Defense for Research and Engineering (OUSD-R&E)
  - Office of the Assistant Secretary of Defense for Critical Technologies (ASD-CT)
  - Office of the Assistant Secretary of Defense for Mission Capabilities (ASD-MC)
  - Office of the Assistant Secretary of Defense for Science and Technology (ASD-ST)
  - Defense Advanced Research Projects Agency (DARPA)
  - Defense Science Board (DSB)
  - Defense Technical Information Center (DTIC)
    - Scientific and Technical Information Program (STI)
      - Department of Defense Information Analytics Center (DoDIAC)
      - Cyber Security and Information Systems Information Analysis Center (CSIAC)
      - Defense Systems Information Analysis Center (DSIAC)
      - Homeland Defense & Security Information Analysis Center (HDIAC)
      - Defense Threat Reduction Information Analysis Center (DTRIAC)
      - Information Assurance Technology Analysis Center (IATAC)
  - Missile Defense Agency (MDA)
  - Office of Strategic Capital
  - Test Resource Management Center
  - Innovation Steering Group
  - Office of Strategic Intelligence and Analysis
  - Office of Systems Engineering and Architecture
  - Developmental Test Evaluation and Assessment

Source: Under Secretary of Defense for Research and Engineering

- Office of the Inspector General (DOD IG)
  - Defense Criminal Investigative Service (DCIS)

Source: Department of Defense Office of Inspector General

- Office of the General Counsel of the Department of Defense (DOD-GC)
  - Defense Legal Services Agency (DLSA)

Source: Department of Defense General Counsel

- Office of the Chief Information Officer (CIO)
  - Command, Control, & Communications (DCIO-C3)
  - Cybersecurity (DCIO-CS)
  - Information Enterprise (DCIO-IE)
  - Resources & Analysis (DCIO-R&A)
  - Defense Information Systems Agency (DISA)

Source: About DoD CIO

- Office of the Assistant to the Secretary of Defense for Public Affairs (ATSD-PA)
  - Defense Media Activity (DMA)
    - Defense Information School (DINFOS)
    - Defense Visual Information Distribution Service (DVIDS)
    - Air Force News
    - Army News
    - Marines News
    - Navy News
    - DoD News
    - American Forces Network (AFN)
    - Stars and Stripes
    - All Hands Magazine
    - Airman Magazine

Source: Defense Media Activity

- Office of the Assistant to the Secretary of Defense for Privacy, Civil Liberties, & Transparency (ATSD-PCLT)
  - Privacy & Civil Liberties Directorate (PCLD)
  - Intelligence Oversight Directorate (IOD)
  - Regulatory Directorate (RD)
  - Freedom of Information Act Directorate (FOIA)

Source: Office of the Assistant to the Secretary of Defense for Privacy, Civil Liberties, and Transparency

- Office of the Director of Administration and Management (DA&M)
  - Information Management & Technology (IM&T)
    - User Engagement Directorate
    - Digital Strategic Planning Directorate
    - Program Analysis and Asset Planning Directorate
  - Performance Improvement Directorate
    - Strategic Planning & Performance Management
    - Defense Management & Performance Improvement
    - Enterprise Risk Management
    - Audit Management
    - Governance, Policy, & Stakeholder Outreach
    - Defense Management Analysis
  - Pentagon Force Protection Agency (PFPA)
  - Washington Headquarters Services (WHS)

Source: Performance Improvement Officer & Director of Administration & Management

- Defense Innovation Unit (DIU)
  - People, Finance and Management
  - Commercial Operations
  - Strategy, Policy, and National Security Partnerships
  - Military Directorate
  - Technology Platforms and Developer Ecosystem
  - Acquisitions
  - Artificial Intelligence and Machine Learning Portfolio
  - Autonomy Portfolio
  - Cyber and Telecommunications Portfolio
  - Emerging Technology Portfolio
  - Energy Portfolio
  - Human Systems Portfolio
  - Space Portfolio

Source: Defense Innovation Unit

- Chief Digital and Artificial Intelligence Office (CDAO)
- Director of Cost Assessment and Program Evaluation (CAPE)
- Office of the Assistant Secretary of Defense for Legislative Affairs (ASD-LA)
- Director of Operational Test and Evaluation (DOT&E)
- Strategic Capabilities Office

Source for all direct reports above: OSD Organizational Structure

- Office of Military Commissions
- United States Court of Military Commission Review

Source: Organization Overview

=== Organization of the Joint Chiefs of Staff and Joint Staff ===
- Chairman of the Joint Chiefs of Staff
  - Vice Chairman of the Joint Chiefs of Staff
    - Chief of Staff of the Army
    - Commandant of the Marine Corps
    - Chief of Naval Operations
    - Chief of Staff of the Air Force
    - Chief of Space Operations
    - Chief of the National Guard Bureau

Joint Staff

- Assistant to the Chairman
- Senior Enlisted Advisor to the Chairman (SEAC)
- Joint Staff Inspector General
- Director, Joint Staff
  - Manpower and Personnel (J-1)
  - Joint Staff Intelligence (J-2)
  - Operations (J-3)
  - Logistics (J-4)
  - Strategy, Plans and Policy (J-5)
  - Command, Control, Communications, & Computers/Cyber (J-6)
  - Joint Force Development (J-7)
  - Force Structure Resources and Assessment (J-8)
  - Directorate of Management

Source: The Joint Staff

Joint Agencies

- National Guard Bureau (NGB)
- Joint Personnel Recovery Agency (JPRA)
- Armed Services Board of Contract Appeals (ASBCA)
- Army and Air Force Exchange Service
- National Defense University (NDU)
  - National War College (NWC)
  - Joint Forces Staff College (JFSC)
  - College of International Security Affairs (CISA)
  - Dwight D. Eisenhower School for National Security and Resource Strategy (The Eisenhower School)
  - College of Information and Cyberspace (CIC)
  - Institute for National Strategic Studies (INSS)

== Military Departments ==
=== Department of the Army ===
==== Army Secretariat ====
- Office of the Secretary of the Army
  - Deputy Under Secretary of the Army
  - District of Columbia National Guard
  - Office of the Under Secretary of the Army (CMO)
    - Director, Small Business Programs
    - Assistant Secretary of the Army (Civil Works)
    - Assistant Secretary of the Army (Acquisition, Logistics and Technology)
    - Assistant Secretary of the Army (Financial Management and Comptroller)
    - Assistant Secretary of the Army (Installations, Energy and Environment)
    - Assistant Secretary of the Army (Manpower and Reserve Affairs)
    - Office of the General Counsel of the Army
    - Office of the Administrative Assistant to the Secretary of the Army (OAA)
    - Department of the Army Inspector General (DAIG)
    - United States Army Audit Agency (USAAA)
    - Office of Army Cemeteries
    - Office of the Chief Information Officer (CIO)
    - Office of the Chief Legislative Liaison
    - Army Public Affairs Center

Source: Army Secretariat

==== The Army Staff ====
- Office of the Chief of Staff of the Army (CSA)
  - Office of the Vice Chief of Staff of the Army (VCSA)
    - Office of the Director, Army Staff
    - Office of the Deputy Chief of Staff (Manpower/Personnel) (G-1)
    - Office of the Deputy Chief of Staff (Intelligence) (G-2)
    - Office of the Deputy Chief of Staff (Plans, Operations and Training) (G-3/5/7)
    - Office of the Deputy Chief of Staff (Logistics) (G-4)
    - Deputy Chief of Staff G-6 (Signal)
    - Office of the Deputy Chief of Staff (Programs) (G-8)
    - Office of the Deputy Chief of Staff G-9 (Installations)
    - Office of the Provost Marshal General (OPMG)
    - Office of the Chief of Chaplains (CCH)
    - Judge Advocate General's Corps (U.S. Army JAG Corps)
    - Office of the Surgeon General (TSG)
    - Chief of Engineers
    - Office of the Sergeant Major of the Army (SMA)
    - Office of the Chief, Army Reserve (CAR)
    - Director, Army National Guard

Source: Headquarters, Department of the Army

==== Army Commands (ACOM) ====
- Futures Command (AFC)
  - Air and Missile Defense (AMD)
  - All-Domain Sensing (ADS)
  - Command and Control (C2)
  - Contested Logistics (CL)
  - Future Vertical Lift (FVL)
  - Long Range Precision Fires (LRPF)
  - Next Generation Combat Vehicles (NGCV)
  - Soldier Lethality (SL)
  - Synthetic Training Environment (STE)
  - Combat Capabilities Development Command (DEVCOM)
    - Army Research Laboratory (ARL)
    - Chemical Biological Center (CBC)
    - Combat Capabilities Development Command Soldier Center (SC)
    - Ground Vehicle System Center (GVSC)
    - Aviation & Missile Center (AvMC)
    - Armaments Center (AC)
    - C5ISR Center (C5ISR Center)
  - Medical Research and Development Command (MRDC)
  - Futures and Concepts Center (FCC)
  - Army Software Factory
  - The Research and Analysis Center (TRAC)
  - Army Applications Laboratory (AAL)

Source: Who We Are

- Materiel Command (AMC)
  - Contracting Command (ACC)
  - Financial Management Command (USAFMCOM)
  - Security Assistance Command (USASACOM)
  - Sustainment Command (ASC)
  - Aviation and Missile Command (AMCOM)
  - Communications-Electronics Command (CECOM)
  - Installation Management Command (IMCOM)
  - Joint Munitions Command (JMC)
  - Joint Munitions and Lethality Lifecycle Management Command (JM&L)
  - Military Surface Deployment and Distribution Command (SDDC)
  - Tank-Automotive and Armaments Command (TACOM)

Source: AMC Major Subordinate Commands

- Army Forces Command (FORSCOM)
  - § Army Forces Command (FORSCOM)
  - Reserve Command (ARCOM)
- Training and Doctrine Command (TRADOC)
  - Subordinate Commands
    - Recruiting Command
    - Cadet Command (AROTC)
    - Center for Initial Military Training (USACIMT)
    - Combined Arms Center (USACAC)
      - Command and General Staff College
        - Command and General Staff School
        - School of Advanced Military Studies (SAMS)
        - School for Command Preparation
        - Sergeants Major Academy (USASMA)
      - Western Hemisphere Institute for Security Cooperation (WHINSEC)
      - Warrant Officer Career College (USAWOCC)
      - Management Staff College
      - Army University Press
      - Aviation Center of Excellence (USAACE)
        - Aviation School
      - Cyber Center of Excellence (CyberCoE)
        - Cyber School
        - Noncommissioned Officer Academy
        - Signal School
        - 15th Signal Brigade
      - Fires Center of Excellence (FCoE)
        - Field Artillery School
        - Air Defense Artillery School
      - Intelligence Center of Excellence (USAICoE)
        - Intelligence School
      - Maneuver Center of Excellence (MCoE)
        - Armor magazine
        - Infantry magazine
        - Armor School
        - Infantry School
      - Maneuver Support Center of Excellence (MSCoE)
        - Engineer School
        - Chemical, Biological, Radiological, Nuclear (CBRN) School
        - Military Police School
      - Medical Department Center and School (MEDCoE)
      - Mission Command Center of Excellence (MCCoE)
      - Noncommissioned Officer (NCO) Leadership Center of Excellence (NCOLCoE)
        - Noncommissioned Officer Candidate Course (NCOCC)
      - Space and Missile Defense Center of Excellence (SMDCoE)
        - Space and Missile Defense School
      - Special Operations Center of Excellence (SOCoE)
        - U.S. Army John F. Kennedy Special Warfare Center and School
      - Sustainment Center of Excellence (SCoE) (Combined Arms Support Command (CASCOM))
        - Army Sustainment University
          - Ordnance School
          - Quartermaster School
          - Soldier Support Institute (SSI)
            - Adjutant General School
            - Financial Management School
          - Transportation School
    - Institute for Religious Leadership (USA-IRL)
    - Center of Military History
      - Army History Magazine
      - Army Museum Enterprise
        - 100th Century Division Historical Holding Center
        - 10th Mountain Division & Fort Drum Museum
        - 1st Infantry Division Museum
        - 2nd Infantry Division Museum
        - 3d Infantry Division Museum
        - 4th Infantry Division and Fort Carson Museum
        - 75th Division Memorial Historical Holding
        - 78th Division Historical Holding
        - 81st Army Reserve Command Historical Holding
        - 82nd Airborne Division War Memorial Museum
        - 96th RSC Museum
        - 99th RSC Museum
        - Adjutant General Corps Museum
        - Air Defense Artillery Training Support Facility
        - Airborne & Special Operations Museum
        - Alaska Army National Guard Historical Holding
        - Ansel M. Stroud Jr. Military History & Weapons Museum (Jackson Barracks Military Museum)
        - Arizona Military Museum
        - Arkansas National Guard Museum
        - Armor & Cavalry Collection
        - Artillery Museum
        - Aviation Museum
        - Basic Combat Training Museum
        - Blue Ridge Division Historical Holding
        - California State Military Museum
        - Camp Atterbury Veterans' Memorial Museum
        - Camp Blanding Museum
        - Chaplain Corps Museum
        - Chemical Corps Museum
        - Corps of Engineers Museum
        - Custer House
        - Don F. Pratt Museum
        - Engineer Museum
        - Finance Corps Museum
        - Fort Bliss Museum and Old Ironsides Museums
        - Fort Dix Military Historical Holding
        - Fort Douglas Military Museum
        - Fort Huachuca Museum
        - Fort McCoy Historical Center
        - Fort Polk Military Historical Holding
        - Fort Sam Houston Museum
        - Fort Sill National Historic Landmark and Museum
        - Frontier Army Museum
        - General George Patton Museum of Leadership
        - Georgia National Guard Museum
        - Harbor Defense Museum
        - Heritage and Education Center
        - Idaho Military History Museum
        - Iowa Gold Star Military Museum
        - John F. Kennedy Special Warfare Museum
        - Kentucky Military History Museum
        - Lewis Army Museum
        - Louisiana Maneuvers Military Museum
        - Maine Military Historical Society
        - Maryland Museum of Military History
        - Massachusetts National Guard Museum and Archives
        - Medical Department Museum (AMEDD Museum)
        - Military Intelligence Soldier Heritage Learning Center
        - Military Police Corps Regimental Museum
        - Mississippi Armed Forces Museum
        - Missouri National Guard Museum
        - Montana Military Museum
        - Museum of Hawaii
        - Museum of the Kansas National Guard
        - National Guard Memorial Museum
        - National Guard Militia Museum of New Jersey
        - National Infantry Museum & Soldier Center (NIMSC)
        - National Mounted Warrior Museum
        - National Museum of the United States Army
        - National Training Center and 11th Armored Cavalry Regiment Museum
        - New York State Military Museum and Research Center
        - Noncommissioned Officer Heritage & Education Center
        - Ohio Army National Guard
        - Ordnance Training Support Facility
        - Oregon Military Museum
        - Pennsylvania National Guard Museum
        - Quartermaster Museum
        - Reed Museum and 2nd Regiment of Dragoons Heritage Center (2d Cavalry Regiment Museum)
        - Rhode Island
        - Rock Island Arsenal Museum
        - Signal Corps Museum
        - South Carolina Military Museum
        - South Dakota National Guard Museum
        - Texas Military Forces Museum
        - Transportation Museum
        - Tropic Lightning Museum
        - U.S. Cavalry Museum
        - USAREUR Theatre and USAREUR Historical Holding Warehouse
        - Vermont National Guard Library and Museum
        - Virginia Army National Guard Historical Collection
        - Washington National Guard Museum
        - West Point Museum
        - White Sands Missile Range Museum
        - Wisconsin National Guard Museum
        - Women's Museum
        - Wyoming National Guard Museum

Museums

Army University Organizational Structure

U.S. Army Training and Doctrine Command

==== Army Service Component Commands (ASCC) ====
§ Commands

- Cyber Command (ARCYBER)
- Central Command (ARCENT)
- Europe and Africa Command (USAREUR-AF)
- North Command (ARNORTH)
- South Command (USARSOUTH)
- Pacific Command (USARPAC)
- Army Special Operations Command (USASOC)
- Military Surface Deployment and Distribution Command (SDDC)
- Space and Missile Defense Command (USASMDC)

==== Direct Reporting Units (DRU) ====
- Arlington National Cemetery (ANC)
- United States Army Test and Evaluation Command (ATEC)
  - Evaluation Center (AEC)
    - Ballistic Missile Defense Operational Test Agency (BMD OTA)
    - Redstone Test Center (RTC)
  - Aberdeen Test Center (ATC)
  - Dugway Proving Ground DPG
    - West Desert Test Center (WDTC)
  - Operational Test Command (OTC)
    - Electronic Proving Ground (EPG)
  - White Sands Missile Range (WSMR)
    - White Sands Test Center (WSTC)
  - Yuma Proving Ground (YPG)
    - Arctic Regions Test Center (ARTC)
    - Tropic Regions Test Center (TRTC)
    - Yuma Test Center (YTC)

Source: Organization

- Civilian Human Resources Agency (CHRA)
- Human Resources Command (HRC)
- Intelligence and Security Command (INSCOM)
  - 66th Military Intelligence Brigade
  - 207th Military Intelligence Brigade
  - 470th Military Intelligence Brigade
  - 500th Military Intelligence Brigade
  - 501st Military Intelligence Brigade
  - 513th Military Intelligence Brigade
  - 116th Military Intelligence Brigade
  - Army Counterintelligence Command
  - Army Field Support Center (AFSC)
  - Army Operations Group (AOG)
  - National Ground Intelligence Center (NGIC)
  - 704th Military Intelligence Brigade
  - 706th Military Intelligence Group
  - 780th Military Intelligence Brigade
  - European Mission Operations Center
  - Expeditionary Operations Support Group
  - Cyber Military Intelligence Group (CMIG)

Source: Major Subordinate Commands

- Military District of Washington (USAMDW)
  - 3d U.S. Infantry Regiment (The Old Guard)
    - Caisson Platoon
    - Commander-in-Chief's Guard
    - Continental Color Guard
    - Old Guard Fife and Drum Corps
    - Presidential Salute Battery
    - Tomb of the Unknown Soldier Sentinals
    - The Drill Team
    - 1st Battalion, 3rd U.S. Infantry Regiment (The Old Guard) (Infantry)
    - 4th Battalion, 3rd U.S. Infantry Regiment (The Old Guard) (Ceremonial)
  - Aviation Brigade
    - Priority Air Transportation (Jet) Detachment
    - 12th Aviation Battalion
    - Aviation Brigade Airfield Division
  - Army Band
  - Field Band
  - Transportation Agency (White House)

Source: Our Mission

- Medical Command (MEDCOM)
- Military Postal Service Agency (MPSA)
- Acquisition Support Center (USAAC)
- United States Army Corps of Engineers (USACE)
  - Great Lakes and Ohio River Division
  - Mississippi Valley Division
  - North Atlantic Division
  - Northwestern Division
  - South Atlantic Division
  - South Pacific Division
  - Southwestern Division
  - Transatlantic Division
  - Army Geospatial Center (AGC)
  - Engineer Research & Development Center (ERDC)
    - Coastal and Hydraulics Laboratory (CHL)
    - Cold Regions Research and Engineering Laboratory (CRREL)
    - Construction Engineering Research Laboratory (CERL)
    - Environmental Laboratory (EL)
    - Geospatial Research Laboratory (GRL)
    - Geotechnical and Structures Laboratory (GSL)
    - Information Technology Laboratory (ITL)
  - Engineering and Support Center, Huntsville (CEHNC)
  - Finance Center (CEFC)
  - Humphreys Engineer Center Support Activity (HECSA)
  - Institute for Water Resources (IWR)
  - Marine Design Center (MDC)
  - 249th Engineer Battalion
  - 911th Technical Rescue Engineer Company
  - 412th Engineer Command
  - 416th Engineer Command

Source: Locations

- Criminal Investigation Division (USACID)
- Army War College (AWC)
- United States Military Academy (USMA)

Source: Organization: Understanding the Army's Structure

=== Department of the Navy ===
==== Navy Secretariat ====
- Office of the Secretary of the Navy (SECNAV)
  - Under Secretary of the Navy
  - Deputy Under Secretary of the Navy
    - Assistant Secretary of the Navy (Financial Management and Comptroller) (ASN FM)
    - Assistant Secretary of the Navy (Energy, Installations and Environment) (ASN EI&E)
    - Assistant Secretary of the Navy (Manpower and Reserve Affairs) (ASN M&RA)
      - Council of Review Boards (CORB)
        - Board of Decorations and Medals (NDBDM)
      - Office of Civilian Human Resources
    - Assistant Secretary of the Navy (Research, Development, and Acquisition) (ASN RDA)
      - Office of Naval Research (ONR)
        - Naval Research Laboratory (NRL)
        - Office of Naval Research, Global
      - Navy Enterprise Resource Planning
      - Naval Acquisitions Career Center
    - Chief Information Officer
    - Naval Audit Service
    - Office of Naval Inspector General
    - General Counsel of the Navy
    - Office of Small Business
    - Office of the Principal Cyber Advisor (USN PCA)
    - Office of Naval Innovation (NAVALX)
    - Judge Advocate General of the Navy (JAG)
      - Judge Advocate General's Corps (JAG Corps)
      - Naval Civil Law Support Activity
    - Navy International Programs Office (NIPO)
    - Department of the Navy Science & Technology Board
    - Board for Correction of Naval Records
    - Assistant for Administration (DON/AA)
    - Naval Criminal Investigative Service (NCIS)
    - Navy-Marine Corps Trial Judiciary
    - Navy-Marine Corps Court of Criminal Appeals
    - Navy-Marine Corps Appellate Review Activity
    - Navy Office of Information (CHINFO)
      - Navy Office of Information East
      - Navy Office of Information West
        - All Hands
    - Navy Public Affairs Support Element (NPASE)
    - United States Navy Band
    - Navy Office of Community Outreach

Source: Organizations

==== Naval Operations ====
- Office of the Chief of Naval Operations
  - Vice Chief of Naval Operations (VCNO)
    - Director, Navy Staff (DNS)
      - Deputy Chief of Naval Operations Information, Plans, & Strategy (N3/N5)
      - Director for Material Readiness & Logistics (N4)
      - Deputy Chief of Naval Operations for Communication Networks (N6)
      - Deputy Chief of Naval Operations for Warfighting Development (N7)
      - Deputy Chief of Naval Operations for Integration of Capabilities & Resources (N8)
  - Master Chief Petty Officer of the Navy (MCPON)
  - Shore Commands
    - Chief of Naval Personnel (CNP) (N1)
      - Bureau of Naval Personnel (BUPERS)
    - Bureau of Medicine and Surgery (BUMED)
    - Strategic Systems Programs
    - United States Naval Academy
    - Naval Education and Training Command (NETC)
      - Naval Recruiting Command
    - Naval Meteorology and Oceanography Command (CNMOC)
      - Naval Oceanographic Office (NAVOCEANO)
      - Fleet Numerical Meteorology & Oceanography Center (FNMOC)
      - United States Naval Observatory (USNO)
      - Naval Oceanography Operations Command
      - Fleet Weather Center - Norfolk (FWC-N)
        - National Ice Center (USNIC)
      - Fleet Weather Center - San Diego (FWC-SD)
        - Joint Typhoon Warning Center (JTWC)
        - Naval Oceanography Anti-Submarine Warfare Center
      - Navy DoD Supercomputing Resource Center
    - Office of Naval Intelligence (ONI) (N2)
    - Naval Aviation Warfighting Development Center (NAWDC)
    - Naval Legal Service Command
    - Naval Safety Command (NAVSAFECOM)
    - Naval Installations Command (NIC)
      - Naval District Washington
        - Navy Ceremonial Guard
    - Operational Test and Evaluation Force (OPTEVFOR)
    - Naval Intelligence Activity (NIA)
  - System Commands
    - Naval Sea Systems Command (NAVSEA)
      - Naval Reactors (NR)
    - Naval Information Warfare Systems Command (NAVWAR)
      - Naval Information Warfare Systems Command Program Executive Offices
    - Naval Supply Systems Command (NAVSUP)
    - Naval Air Systems Command (NAVAIR)
    - Naval Facilities Engineering Command (NAVFAC)
  - Type Commands
    - Naval Special Warfare Command (USNSWC)
    - Expeditionary Combat Command (NECC)
    - Naval Information Forces (NAVIFOR)
    - Naval Surface Forces
    - Naval Submarine Forces
    - Naval Air Forces
- Additional Echelon II Commands
  - Naval Reserve Forces (USNR)
    - Naval Air Force Reserve
  - Naval Postgraduate School (NPS)
  - Naval War College
  - Naval History and Heritage Command
    - National Museum of the U.S. Navy
    - National Naval Aviation Museum
    - National Museum of the American Sailor
    - Hampton Roads Naval Museum
    - U.S. Navy Seabee Museum
    - Submarine Force Library and Museum
    - Naval Undersea Museum
    - Puget Sound Navy Museum
    - Naval War College Museum
    - U.S. Naval Academy Museum
    - USS Constitution

Source: Navy

==== Marine Corps Headquarters ====
- Commandant of the Marine Corps (CMC)
  - Counsel for the Commandant
  - Chaplain of the Marine Corps (CHMC)
  - Sergeant Major of the Marine Corps
  - Marine Corps Combat Development Command (MCCDC)
    - Training and Education Command (TECOM)
      - Marine Air-Ground Task Force - Training Command (MAGTF-TC)
      - Training Command
        - Assault Amphibian School
        - Center for Learning and Faculty Development
        - Expeditionary Warfare Training Group-Pacific
        - Expeditionary Warfare Training Group-Atlantic
        - Field Medical Training Battalion - East
        - Field Medical Training Battalion - West
        - Marine Aviation Training Support Group 21 (MATSG-21)
        - Marine Aviation Training Support Group 22 (MATSG-22)
        - Marine Aviation Training Support Group 23 (MATSG-23)
        - Marine Corps Combat Service Support Schools
        - Marine Corps Communication Electronics School (MCCES)
        - Marine Corps Detachment, Fort Leonard Wood
        - Marine Corps Engineer School
        - Marine Corps Intelligence Schools
        - Marine School of Artillery
        - Officer Candidates School (OCS)
        - United States Marine Corps School of Infantry (SOI)
        - The Basic School (TBS)
        - Weapons Training Battalion
      - Education Command
        - Marine Corps War College (MCWAR)
        - Command & Staff College (Marine Corps University)
        - College of Distance Education & Training
        - College of Enlisted Military Education
        - Expeditionary Warfare School
        - School of Advanced Warfighting (SAW)
        - History Division (HD)
          - National Museum of the Marine Corps
  - Marine Corps National Capital Region
  - Marine Corps Recruiting Command
  - Marine Barracks, Washington, D.C.
  - Marine Corps Systems Command (MCSC)
  - Assistant Commandant of the Marine Corps
    - Marine Corps Operational Test and Evaluation Activity (MCOTEA)
    - Director Marine Corps Staff
    - Deputy Commandant for Manpower & Reserve Affairs
    - Deputy Commandant for Plans, Policy & Operations
      - Marine Corps Embassy Security Group (MCESG)
    - Deputy Commandant for Aviation (DCA)
    - Deputy Commandant for Installations & Logistics
      - Marine Corps Installations Command (MCICOM)
      - Marine Corps Logistics Command (MARCORLOGCOM)
    - Deputy Commandant for Combat Development and Integration
    - Deputy Commandant for Programs & Resources
    - Deputy Commandant for Information
    - Director, Health Services
    - Inspector General of the Marine Corps
    - Director, Command, Control, Communications & Computers
    - Legislative Assistant to the Commandant
    - Office of Marine Corps Communication
    - Marine Corps Intelligence
    - Staff Judge Advocate to the Commandant
    - Director, Safety Division

Director, Marine Corps Staff

Training and Education Command

=== Department of the Air Force ===
==== Air Force Secretariat ====
- Secretary of the Air Force
  - Director for Administration and Management
  - Under Secretary of the Air Force
    - Chief of Staff to the Undersecretary of the Air Force
    - Assistant Secretary of the Air Force
    - Assistant Secretary of the Air Force (Acquisition, Technology and Logistics) (SAF/AQ)
    - Assistant Secretary of the Air Force (Financial Management and Comptroller) (SAF/FM)
    - Assistant Secretary of the Air Force (Installations, Environment and Logistics)
      - Deputy Assistant Secretary of the Air Force (Operational Energy)
    - Deputy Under Secretary of the Air Force (International Affairs)
    - Assistant Secretary of the Air Force (Manpower and Reserve Affairs)
    - Deputy Assistant Secretary of the Air Force for Force Management
    - Director of Public Affairs
    - Director, Legislative Liaison
    - Director, Competitive Activities
    - Director for Studies and Analysis
    - Director of Security, Special Program Oversight and Information Protection, Competitive Activities
    - Director, Air Force Small Business Programs
    - Deputy Director of Staff
    - Director, Program Assessment and Evaluation (SAF/AE)
    - Auditor General of the Air Force
    - Inspector General of the Department of the Air Force
    - General Counsel of the Department of the Air Force
    - Director, Air Force Warfighting Integration Capability
    - Chief Information Officer
    - Principal Cyber Advisor
    - Director of Test and Evaluation
    - Chief Scientist of the Air Force

==== Air Staff ====
- Chief of Staff) (AF/CC)
  - Chief Master Sergeant of the Air Force (CMSAF)
  - Vice Chief of Staff) (AF/CV
    - Director of Staff (AF/DS)
      - Deputy Chief of Staff (Manpower, Personnel and Services) (A1)
      - Deputy Chief of Staff (Intelligence) (A2)
      - Deputy Chief of Staff (Operations) (A3/5)
      - Deputy Chief of Staff, Air Force Futures
      - Deputy Chief of Staff (Logistics, Engineering, and Force Protection) (A4/7)
      - Deputy Chief of Staff (Plans and Programs) (A8)
      - Deputy Chief of Staff (Warfighter Communications and Cyber Systems)
      - Deputy Chief of Staff, Strategic Deterrence and Nuclear Integration
      - Director for Studies Analyses, Assessments and Lessons Learned (A9)
      - Judge Advocate General (AF/JA)
      - Chief, Air Force Reserve (AF/RE)
      - Director, Air National Guard (NGB/CF)
      - Director, Test and Evaluation (AF/TE)
      - Chief of Chaplains (AF/HC)
      - Chief of Safety (AF/SE)
      - Chief Scientist (AF/ST)
      - Surgeon General of the Air Force) (AF/SG)

==== Major Commands ====
- Air Combat Command (ACC)
- Air Education and Training Command (AETC)
- Air Force Materiel Command (AFMC)
- Air Force Reserve Command
- Air Force Special Operations Command (AFSOC)
- Air Force Global Strike Command (AFGSC)
- Air Mobility Command (AMC)
- Pacific Air Forces (PACAF)
- Air Forces in Europe - Air Force Africa (USAFE-AFAFRICA)

Source: Air Force Senior Leaders

==== Direct Reporting Units ====
- Air Force District of Washington (AFDW)
- Air Force Medical Command (AFMEDCOM)
- Air Force Operational Test and Evaluation Center
- United States Air Force Academy (USAFA)

==== Field Operating Agencies ====
- Air Force Agency for Modeling and Simulation
- Air Force Audit Agency
- Air National Guard Readiness Center
- Air Force Civil Engineer Support Agency
- Air Force Cost Analysis Agency
- Air Force Flight Standards Agency
- Air Force Historical Research Agency
- Air Force Inspection Agency
- Air Force Legal Operations Agency
- Air Force Manpower Analysis Agency
- Air Force Mortuary Affairs Operations
- Air Force National Security Emergency Preparedness Office
- Air Force Office of Special Investigations
- Air Force Operations Group
- Air Force Personnel Center
- Air Force Program Executive Office
- Air Force Public Affairs Agency
- Air Force Review Boards Agency
- Air Force Safety Center
- Air Force Technical Applications Center
- Air Reserve Personnel Center
- National Air and Space Intelligence Center

==== Named Establishments ====
- Air Force Civil Engineer Center (AFCEC)
- Air Force Drug Testing Laboratory
- Air Force Installation Contracting Center (AFICC)
- Air Force Institute of Technology (AFIT)
- Air Force Nuclear Weapons Center (AFNWC)
- Air Force Research Laboratory (AFRL)
- Air Force Reserve Command Force Generation Center
- Air Force Security Forces Center (AFSFC)
- Air Force Services Center (AFSVC)
- Air University
- Arnold Engineering Development Complex (AEDC)
- Commandant of Cadets
- Curtis E. LeMay Center for Doctrine Development and Education
- Civil Air Patrol, USAF (CAP)
- Cyberspace Capabilities Center (CCC)
- Dean of Faculty
- Directorate of Athletics
- Individual Reservist Readiness and Integration Organization
- Ira C. Eaker Center for Leadership Development
- Jeanne M. Holm Center for Officer Accessions and Citizen Development
- Nevada Test and Training Range (NTTR)
- Ogden Air Logistics Complex (OO-ALC)
- Oklahoma City Air Logistics Complex (OC-ALC)
- Pacific Air Forces Regional Support Center
- Presidential Airlift Group
- Special Warfare Training Group
- Squadron Officer School (SOS)
- Thomas N. Barnes Center for Enlisted Education
- United States Air Force Academy Preparatory School
- USAF Weapons School
- USAF Expeditionary Center
- USAF Nuclear Command, Control, and Communications Center
- United States Air Forces in Europe and Air Forces Africa Warrior Center
- Utah Test and Training Range (UTTR)
- Warner Robins Air Logistics Complex (WR-ALC)
- Western Air Defense Sector (WADS)

==== Named Units ====
- Air Command and Staff College (ACSC)
- Air Combat Command Air Operations Squadron
- Air Combat Command Communications Support Squadron
- Air Combat Command Operations Analysis Squadron
- Air Combat Command Training Support Squadron
- Air Education and Training Command Computer Systems Squadron
- Air Education and Training Command Studies and Analysis Squadron
- Air Force Command and Control Integration Center
- Air Force Material Command Law Office
- Air Force Office of Special Investigations Field Support Squadron
- Air Force Office of Special Investigations Office of Procurement Fraud Investigations
- Air Force Office of Special Investigations Office of Special Projects
- Air Force Petroleum Agency
- Air Force Rescue Coordination Center (AFRCC)
- Air Force Security Assistance Training Squadron
- Air Force SEEK EAGLE Office
- Air Force Senior Noncommissioned Officer Academy
- Air Mobility Command Logistics, Engineering and Force Protection Squadron
- Air Mobility Command Test and Evaluation Squadron
- Air War College (AWC)
- Aircraft Analysis Squadron
- Andrews Dental Squadron
- Andrews Healthcare Operations Squadron
- Andrews Operational Medical Readiness Squadron
- Andrews Surgical Operations Squadron
- Ballistic Missiles Analysis Squadron
- Bolling Medical Squadron
- Eastern Air Defense Sector (EADS)
- Electromagnetic Systems Analysis Squadron
- F-35 Partner Support Complex
- Foreign Materiel Exploitation Squadron
- Future Threats Analysis Squadron
- Global Activities Squadron
- Inter-European Air Forces Academy
- Integrated Command, Control, Communications, Computers, Intelligence, Surveillance and Reconnaissance Analysis Squadron
- Muir S. Fairchild Research Information Center
- National Museum of the United States Air Force
- Officer Training School (OTS)
- Pacific Air Forces Cyberspace Systems Squadron
- Pacific Air Forces Air Postal Squadron
- Presidential Airlift Squadron
- Presidential Logistics Squadron
- Signals Analysis Squadron
- Space Analysis Squadron
- Special Operations Advanced Capabilities Squadron
- The United States Air Force Band
- United States Air Force Academy Band
- United States Air Force Band of the Pacific
- United States Air Force Band of the West
- United States Air Force Heritage of America Band
- United States Air Forces in Europe Air Postal Squadron
- United States Air Forces in Europe Band
- United States Air Forces in Europe NCO Academy
- USAF Advanced Maintenance and Munitions Officer School
- USAF Air Demonstration Squadron (Thunderbirds)
- USAF Expeditionary Operations School
- USAF Honor Guard
- USAF School of Aerospace Medicine (USAFSAM)
- USAF Radiochemistry Laboratory
- USAF Special Investigations Academy
- USAF Special Operations School (USAFSOS)
- USAF Test Pilot School
- USAF Warfare Center
- Walter Reed Inpatient Operations Squadron

==== Space Staff ====
- Chief of Space Operations
  - Vice Chief of Space Operations
  - Director of Staff
  - Chief Master Sergeant of the Space Force (CMSSF)
  - Deputy Chief of Space Operations

Source: Leadership

==== Space Force Field Commands ====
- United States Space Force Combat Forces Command
- Space Systems Command (SSC)
- Space Training and Readiness Command
- Space Forces - Central (USSPACEFOR-CENT)
- Space Forces - Indo-Pacific (USSPACEFOR-INDOPAC)
- Space Forces - Space

==== Space Force Named Organizations ====
- National Security Space Institute (NSSI)
- Space Acquisition and Integration Office
- Space Warfighting Analysis Center (SWAC)
- Space Force Commercial Satellite Communications Office

==== Space Force Direct Reporting Units ====
- Space Development Agency (SDA)
- Space Rapid Capabilities Office

Source: Space Force Organizational Records

== Commands ==
=== United States Cyber Command (USCYBERCOM) ===
- Army Cyber Command (ARCYBER)
  - Joint Force Headquarters-Cyber [JFHQ-C] (Army)
- Fleet Cyber Command (FLTCYBER)
  - JFHQ-C (Navy)
  - Tenth Fleet (C10F)
    - Naval Network Warfare Command
- Air Forces Cyber (AFCYBER)
  - JFHQ-C (Air Force)
  - Sixteenth Air Force (16 AF)
- Marine Corps Forces Cyberspace Command (MARFORCYBER)
  - JFHQ-C (Marines)
- Cyber National Mission Force (CNMF)
- Department of Defense Cyber Defense Command (DCDC)

DCDC was formerly known as Joint Force Headquarters - Department of Defense Information Network (JFHQ-DODIN)

Source: Our Service Cyber Partners

=== Special Operations Command (USSOCOM) ===
- Army Special Operations Command (Fort Bragg, NC) (USASOC)
  - 75th Ranger Regiment (Fort Benning, GA)
  - 160th Special Operations Aviation Regiment (Airborne) (Fort Campbell, KY)
  - Special Forces Command (Airborne) (Fort Bragg, NC)
  - Special Operations Support Command (Fort Bragg, NC)
  - John F. Kennedy Special Warfare Center (Fort Bragg, NC)
  - 4th Psychological Operations Group (Airborne) (Fort Bragg, NC)
  - 95th Civil Affairs Brigade (Provisional) (Fort Bragg, NC)
- Navy Special Warfare Command (NAB Coronado, CA) (USNSWC)
  - Special Warfare Group One (NAB Coronado, CA)
  - Special Warfare Group Two (NAB Little Creek, VA)
  - Special Boat Squadron One (NAB Coronado, CA)
  - Special Boat Squadron Two (NAB Little Creek, VA)
  - Naval Special Warfare Center (NAB Coronado, CA)
- Air Force Special Operations Command (Hurlburt Field, FL) (AFSOC)
  - 919th Special Operations Wing (Duke Field, FL)
  - 18th Flight Test Squadron (Hurlburt Field, FL)
  - Air Force Special Operations Command Air Support Operations Squadron (Fort Bragg, NC)
  - United States Air Force Special Operations School (Hurlburt Field, FL)
  - 720th Special Tactics Group (Hurlburt Field, FL)
  - 1st Special Operations Wing (Hurlburt Field, FL)
  - 193d Special Operations Wing (Harrisburg IAP, PA)
  - 352nd Special Operations Wing (RAF Mildenhall, UK)
  - 353rd Special Operations Wing (Kadena AB, Japan)
- Marine Special Operations Command (MARSOC)
  - Marine Raider Regiment
  - Marine Raider Support Group
  - Marine Special Operations School
  - Marine Special Operations Advisor Group
- Joint Special Operations Command (Pope AFB, NC and Fort Bragg, NC) (JSOC)
  - Task Force 6-26 (Bagram AB, Afghanistan)
  - Task Force 145 (Bagram AB, Afghanistan)
  - Delta Force (Fort Bragg, NC)
  - Naval Special Warfare Development Group (Dam Neck, VA)
  - 24th Special Tactics Squadron (Pope AFB, NC)
- Joint Special Operations University (JSOU)
- Special Operations Forces Acquisitions, Technology and Logistics Center (SOC AT&L)
- Preservation of the Force and Family (POTFF)
- Force & Family Readiness (FFRP)
- Warrior Care Program (Care Coalition)

Source: Enterprise

=== Strategic Command (USSTRATCOM) ===
==== Order of battle ====
- Global Operations Center (GOC) (Offutt AFB, NE)
- Strategic Communications Wing 1 (SCW 1) (TACAMO) (E-6B) (Tinker AFB, OK)
- Air Force Global Strike Command (AFGSC) (Barksdale Air Force Base, LA)
  - 20th Air Force (F. E. Warren AFB, WY)
    - 90th Missile Wing (LGM-118A, LGM-30G, UH-1N) (Francis E Warren AFB, WY)
    - 91st Missile Wing (LGM-30G, UH-1N) (Minot AFB, ND)
    - 341st Missile Wing (LGM-30G, UH-1N) (Malmstrom AFB, MT)
  - 8th Air Force (Barksdale AFB, LA)
- Fleet Forces Command (FFC) (NB Norfolk, VA)
  - Submarine Force Atlantic Fleet (SUBLANT) (NB Norfolk, VA)
    - Submarine Group 10 (SUBGRU 10) (NSB Kings Bay, GA)
  - Submarine Force Pacific Fleet (SUBPAC) (NB Pearl Harbor, HI)
    - Submarine Group 9 (SUBGRU 9) (NB Kitsap, WA)
- Army Space and Missile Defense Command (USARSPACE) / US Army Forces Strategic Command (USARSTRAT) (Arlington, VA)
  - 100th Missile Defense Brigade (Ground-based Missile Defense) (Peterson AFB, CO)
- Joint Force Air Component Command (JFACC)
- Joint Force Maritime Component Command (JFMCC)
  - Combined Joint Operations from the Sea Center of Excellence (CJOS)
- Marine Corps Forces Strategic Command (MARFORSTRAT) (Offutt AFB, NE)

Source: About USSTRATCOM

=== Transportation Command (USTRANSCOM) ===
==== Order of battle ====
- Air Mobility Command (AMC) (Scott AFB, IL)
  - 18th Air Force (Scott AFB, IL)
    - 15th Expeditionary Mobility Task Force (Travis AFB, CA)
      - 60th Air Mobility Wing (C-5A/B/C, KC-10A) (Travis AFB, CA)
      - 62nd Airlift Wing (C-17A) (McChord AFB, WA)
      - 317th Airlift Group (C-130H) (Dyess AFB, TX)
      - 375th Airlift Wing (Operational Support Airlift) (C-21A, C-9A) (Scott AFB, IL)
      - 22nd Air Refueling Wing (KC-135R/T) (McConnell AFB, KS)
      - 92nd Air Refueling Wing (KC-135R/T) (Fairchild AFB, WA)
      - 19th Air Refueling Wing (KC-135R/T) (Grand Forks AFB, ND)
      - 615th Contingency Response Wing (Travis AFB, CA)
      - 715th Air Mobility Support Group (Hickam AFB, HI)
    - 21st Expeditionary Mobility Task Force (McGuire AFB, NJ)
      - 436th Airlift Wing (C-5A/B) (Dover AFB, DE)
      - 305th Air Mobility Wing (C-17A, KC-10A) (McGuire AFB, NJ)
      - 437th Airlift Wing (C-17A) (Charleston AFB, SC)
      - 43d Airlift Wing (C-130E) (Pope AFB, NC)
      - 314th Airlift Wing (C-130E/H) (Little Rock AFB, AR)
      - 89th Airlift Wing (VIP) (VC-25A, VC/C-37A, C-20B, C-32A, C-40B) (Andrews AFB, MD)
      - 6th Air Mobility Wing (KC-135R, C-37A) (MacDill AFB, FL)
      - 19th Air Refueling Group (KC-135R, EC-137D) (Robins AFB, GA)
      - 621st Contingency Response Wing (McGuire AFB, NJ)
      - 721st Air Mobility Operations Group (Ramstein AB, Germany)
  - 4th Air Force (AFRes) (McClellan AFB, CA)
    - 433d Airlift Wing (AFRes) (C-5A) (Lackland AFB, TX)
    - 445th Airlift Wing (AFRes) (C-5A) (Wright-Patterson AFB, OH)
    - 349th Air Mobility Wing (AFRes) (C-5A/B/C, KC-10A (Associate unit to 60th Air Mobility Wing)) (Travis AFB, CA)
    - 452d Air Mobility Wing (AFRes) (C-17A, KC-135E) (March ARB, CA)
    - 446th Airlift Wing (AFRes) (C-17A (Associate unit to 62nd Airlift Wing)) (McChord AFB, WA)
    - 932d Airlift Wing (Operational Support Airlift) (AFRes) (C-9C (Associate unit to 375th Airlift Wing)) (Scott AFB, IL)
    - 434th Air Refueling Wing (AFRes) (KC-135R) (Grissom ARB, IN)
    - 459th Air Refueling Wing (AFRes) (KC-135R) (Andrews AFB, MD)
    - 507th Air Refueling Wing (AFRes) (KC-135R, E-3B/C, TC-18E) (Tinker AFB, OK)
    - 916th Air Refueling Wing (AFRes) (KC-125R) (Seymour-Johnson AFB, NC)
    - 931st Air Refueling Group (AFRes) (KC-135R) (McConnell AFB, KS)
    - 939th Air Refueling Wing (AFRes) (KC-135R (Portland IAP, OR)
    - 927th Air Refueling Wing (AFRes) (KC-135E) (Selfridge ANGB, MI)
    - 940th Air Refueling Wing (AFRes) (KC-135E) (Beale AFB, CA)
  - 22nd Air Force (AFRes) (Dobbins AFB, GA)
    - 94th Airlift Wing (AFRes) (C-130H) (Dobbins ARB, GA)
    - 302d Airlift Wing (AFRes) (C-130H) (Peterson AFB, CO)
    - 315th Airlift Wing (AFRes) (C-17A) (Associate unit of 437th Airlift Wing)) (Charleston AFB, SC)
    - 439th Airlift Wing (AFRes) (C-5A) (Westover ARB, MA)
    - 440th Airlift Wing (AFRes) (C-130H) (Gen. Mitchell ARS, Milwaukee, WI)
    - 512th Airlift Wing (AFRes) (C-5A/B (Associate unit to 436th Airlift Wing)) (Dover AFB, DE)
    - 908th Airlift Wing (AFRes) (C-130H) (Maxwell AFB, AL)
    - 910th Airlift Wing (AFRes) (C-130H) (Youngstown ARS, OH)
    - 911th Airlift Wing (AFRes) (C-130H) (Greater Pittsburgh IAP, PA)
    - 914th Airlift Wing (AFRes) (C-130H) (Niagara Falls IAP, NY)
    - 934th Airlift Wing (AFRes) (C-130E) (Minneapolis St Paul ARS, MN)
    - 514th Air Mobility Wing (AFRes) (C-17A, KC-10A (Associate unit to 305th Air Mobility Wing)) (McGuire AFB, NJ)
  - Air National Guard Airlift
    - 135th Airlift Group (MD ANG) (C-130J) (Glenn L Martin AP, MD)
    - 105th Airlift Wing (NY ANG) (C-5A) (Stewart IAP, NY)
    - 107th Airlift Wing (NY ANG) (C-130H) (Niagara Falls ARS, NY)
    - 109th Airlift Wing (NY ANG) (C-130H, C-26B) (Schenectady CAP, NY)
    - 118th Airlift Wing (TN ANG) (C-130H) (Nashville MP, TN)
    - 123d Airlift Wing (KY ANG) (C-130H) (Standiford Fd, KY)
    - 130th Airlift Wing (WV ANG) (C-130H) (Yeager AP, Charleston, WV)
    - 133d Airlift Wing (MN ANG) (C-130H) (Minneapolis St Paul, MN)
    - 136th Airlift Wing (TX ANG) (C-130H) (NAS JRB Fort Worth, TX)
    - 139th Airlift Wing (MO ANG) (C-130H) (Rosecrans MAP, MO)
    - 143d Airlift Wing (RI ANG) (C-130E) (Quonset Point St AP, RI)
    - 145th Airlift Wing (NC ANG) (C-130H) (Charlotte IAP, NC
    - 146th Airlift Wing (CA ANG) (C-130E) (NAWS Pt Mugu, CA)
    - 152d Airlift Wing (NV ANG) (C-130E/H) (Reno-Tahoe IAP, NV)
    - 153d Airlift Wing (WY ANG) (C-130H) (Cheyenne MAP, WY)
    - 164th Airlift Wing (TN ANG) (C-5A) (Memphis IAP, TN)
    - 165th Airlift Wing (GA ANG) (C-130H) (Savannah IAP, GA)
    - 166th Airlift Wing (DE ANG) (C-130H) (Greater Wilmington AP, DE)
    - 167th Airlift Wing (WV ANG) (C-130H) (Martinsburgh AP, WV)
    - 172d Airlift Wing (MI ANG) (C-17) (Thompson Fd, Jackson, MI)
    - 179th Airlift Wing (OH ANG) (C-130H) (Mansfield-Lahm AP, OH)
    - 182d Airlift Wing (IL ANG) (C-130E) (Greater Peoria AP, IL)
  - Air National Guard Aerial Refueling
    - 101st Air Refueling Wing (ME ANG) (KC-135R) (Bangor IAP, ME)
    - 108th Air Refueling Wing (NJ ANG) (KC-135E) (McGuire AFB, NJ)
    - 117th Air Refueling Wing (AL ANG) (KC-135R) (Birmingham MAP, AL)
    - 121st Air Refueling Wing (OH ANG) (KC-135R) (Rickenbacker ANGB, OH)
    - 126th Air Refueling Wing (IL ANG) (KC-135E) (Chicago-O'Hare IAP, IL)
    - 134th Air Refueling Wing (TN ANG) (KC-135E) (McGhee-Tyson AP, TN)
    - 137th Air Refueling Wing (OK ANG) (KC-135) (Tinker AFB, OK)
    - 141st Air Refueling Wing (WA ANG) (KC-135E, C-26B) (Fairchild AFB, WA)
    - 151st Air Refueling Wing (UT ANG) (KC-135E) (Salt Lake City IAP, UT)
    - 157th Air Refueling Wing (NH ANG) (KC-135R) (Pease AFB, NH)
    - 161st Air Refueling Wing (AZ ANG) (KC-135E) (Phoenix-Sky Harbour AP, AZ)
    - 171st Air Refueling Wing (PA ANG) (KC-135T) (Greater Pittsburgh IAP, PA)
    - 185th Air Refueling Wing (IA ANG) (KC-135R) (Sioux City Gateway AP, IA)
    - 186th Air Refueling Wing (MS ANG) (KC-135R, C-26B) (Key Fd, Meridian, MS)
    - 190th Air Refueling Wing (KS ANG) (KC-135D/E) (Forbes Fd, Topeka, KS)
- Military Sealift Command (MSC) (Washington Navy Yard, DC)
  - Sealift Logistics Command Atlantic (SEALOGLANT) (NB Norfolk, VA)
  - Sealift Logistics Command Pacific (SEALOGPAC) (NB San Diego, CA)
  - Sealift Logistics Command Europe (SEALOGEUR) (Naples, Italy)
  - Sealift Logistics Command Central (SEALOGCENT) (Manama, Bahrain)
  - Sealift Logistics Command Far East (SEALOGFE) (Sembawang, Singapore)
  - Maritime Prepositioning Force
    - Maritime Prepositioning Ship Squadron 2 (MPSRON 2)
    - Maritime Prepositioning Ship Squadron 3 (MPSRON 3) (PDS Agana, Guam, effective July 2019)
  - Sealift Force
  - Naval Fleet Auxiliary Force
- Surface Deployment and Distribution Command (SDDC) (Alexandria, VA)
  - 143d Sustainment Command (USAR) (Orlando, FL)
    - 7th Transportation Brigade (Ft Eustis, VA)
    - 32nd Transportation Group (Composite) (USAR) (Tampa, FL)
    - 300th Transportation Group (Composite) (USAR) (Butler, PA)
    - 336th Transportation Group (Composite) (USAR) (Ft Sheridan, IL)
    - 375th Transportation Group (Composite) (USAR) (Mobile, AL)
  - 1179th Deployment Support Brigade (USAR) (Ft Hamilton, NY)
  - 1190th Deployment Support Brigade (USAR) (Baton Rouge, LA)
  - 1394th Deployment Support Brigade (USAR) (Cp Pendleton, CA)
  - 1176th Transportation Terminal Brigade (USAR) (Baltimore, MD)
  - 1185th Transportation Terminal Brigade (USAR) (Lancaster, PA)
  - 1192nd Transportation Terminal Brigade (USAR) (New Orleans, LA)
  - 1186th Transportation Terminal Brigade (USAR) (Jacksonville, FL)
  - 1189th Transportation Terminal Brigade (USAR) (Charleston, SC)
  - 1395th Transportation Terminal Brigade (USAR) (Seattle, WA)
  - 1397th Transportation Terminal Brigade (USAR) (Port Hueneme, California)
    - 595th Transportation Brigade (Camp Arifjan, Kuwait)
  - 596th Transportation Brigade (Military Ocean Terminal Sunny Point, Southport, NC)
  - 597th Transportation Brigade (Fort Eustis, Virginia)
  - 598th Transportation Brigade (Rotterdam, Netherlands)
  - 599th Transportation Brigade (Wheeler Army Airfield, Hawaii)
- Joint Enabling Capabilities Command (JECC)
  - Joint Communications Support Element (JCSE)
  - Joint Planning Support Element (JPSE)

Source: USTRANSCOM

== Unified combatant commands: Geographic ==
=== Africa Command (USAFRICOM) ===
- Combined Joint Task Force – Horn of Africa (CJTF-HOA)
- Southern European Task Force, Africa (SETA-AF)
- Air Forces in Europe – Air Forces Africa (USAFE-AFAFRICA)
- Marine Corps Forces Europe and Africa (MARFOREUR/AF)
- Naval Forces Europe and Africa (NAVEUR-NAVAF)
- United States Special Operations Command Africa (SOCAFRICA)
- Africa Partnership Station (APS)
- Africa Maritime Law Enforcement Partnership (AMLEP)
- Global Peace Operations Initiative (GPOI)
- International Military Education and Training (IMET)
- State Partnership Program (SPP)
- Africa Endeavor
- African Partnership Outbreak Response Alliance (APORA)
- Africa Enlisted Development Strategy (AEDS)

Source: United States Africa Command

=== Central Command (USCENTCOM) ===
- Army Central (ARCENT)
- Naval Forces Central Command (NAVCENT)
- Air Forces Central Command (AFCENT) (also known as Ninth Air Force)
- Marine Corps Forces Central Command (MARCENT)
- Special Operations Command Central (SOCCENT)
- Space Forces Central (SPACECENT)

Source: Unified Commands, CENTCOM & Components

=== European Command (USEUCOM) ===
==== Order of battle ====
- Army Europe and Africa (USAREUR-AF) (also known as Seventh US Army)
  - V Corps (inactivated 12 June 2013)
    - 2nd Cavalry Regiment
    - 12th Combat Aviation Brigade
    - 170th Infantry Brigade (Inactivation ceremony held 9 October 2012)
    - 172nd Infantry Brigade (Inactivated 31 May 2013)
    - 173rd Airborne Brigade Combat Team
    - 357th Air & Missile Defense Detachment
  - 21st Sustainment Command (Theater)
    - 16th Sustainment Brigade
    - 18th Engineer Brigade
    - 18th Military Police Brigade
    - 405th Army Field Support Brigade
  - 5th Signal Command
    - 2nd Signal Brigade
    - 7th Tactical Theater Signal Brigade
  - 56th Artillery Command
  - 10th Army Air and Missile Defense Command
  - 7th Army Training Command
  - 66th Military Intelligence Brigade
  - 202nd Military Police Group (CID)
  - Europe Regional Medical Command
  - Area Support Group Black Sea (ASG-BS)
  - Multi-National Task Force East, Kosovo
- Naval Forces Europe and Africa (NAVEUR-NAVAF)
  - United States Sixth Fleet
    - Destroyer Squadron 60
    - Task Force 60
    - Task Force 61, amphibious assault force
    - Task Force 62, landing force (Marine expeditionary unit)
    - Task Force 63, logistics force
    - Task Force 64, Integrated Air and Missile Defense Force
    - Task Force 65
    - Task Force 66
    - Task Force 67, land-based maritime patrol aircraft
    - Task Force 68, maritime force protection force
    - Task Force 69, submarine force
  - Navy Region Europe
    - Naval Support Activity Bahrain
      - Marine Corps Security Force Company Bahrain
    - Naval Support Activity Naples
    - Commander, U.S. Naval Activities Spain
      - Naval Station Rota
      - Marine Corps Security Force Company Europe
    - Camp Lemonnier, Djibouti
    - Naval Support Activity Souda Bay
    - Naval Air Station Sigonella
    - Naval Support Facility Deveselu
    - Naval Support Facility Redzikowo
- Air Forces in Europe – Air Forces Africa (USAFE-AFAFRICA)
  - Third Air Force
    - 31st Fighter Wing
    - 48th Fighter Wing
    - 52nd Fighter Wing
    - 86th Airlift Wing
    - 100th Air Refueling Wing
    - 435th Air Expeditionary Wing
    - 435th Air Ground Operations Wing
    - 501st Combat Support Wing
    - 39th Air Base Wing
- Marine Corps Forces Europe and Africa (MARFOREUR/AF)
- Special Operations Command Europe (SOCEUR)
- Space Forces Europe and Africa (USSPACEFOR-EURAF)

Source: Our Forces

=== Northern Command (USNORTHCOM) ===
- Special Operations Command North (SOCNORTH)
- Alaskan Command (ALCOM)
- Air Forces Northern (AFNORTH) (also known as First Air Force)
  - Air Forces Northern National Security Emergency Preparedness Directorate
- Naval Forces Northern Command (NAVNORTH)
- Fleet Marine Forces Atlantic FMFLANT)

==== Order of battle ====
- North American Aerospace Defense Command (NORAD) (Peterson SFB (Space Force Base), CO)
  - Cheyenne Mountain Operations Center (Peterson SFB, CO)
  - 1st Air Force / Continental US (CONUS) NORAD Region (Tyndall AFB, FL)
    - Eastern Air Defense Sector (The Northeast took over the Southeast's role in 2007) (NY ANG) (Rome, NY)
      - 104th Fighter Wing (MA ANG) (F-15C, C-26B) (Barnes MAP, MA)
      - 125th Fighter Wing (FL ANG) (F-15A/B, C-26B) (Jacksonville IAP, FL)
        - Detachment 1 (FL ANG) (F-15A/B) (Homestead Air Reserve Base, FL)
      - 158th Fighter Wing (VT ANG) (F-16C/D, C-26B) (Burlington IAP, VT)
      - Detachment 1, 119th Fighter Wing (ND ANG) (F-16A/B) (Langley AFB, VA)
    - Western Air Defense Sector (WA ANG) (McChord AFB, WA)
      - 142nd Fighter Wing (OR ANG) (F-15A/B, C-26B) (Portland IAP, OR)
      - 119th Fighter Wing (ND ANG) (F-16A/B, C-26B) (Hector Fd, ND)
      - 120th Fighter Wing (MT ANG) (F-15C, C-26B) (Great Falls IAP, MT)
      - 144th Fighter Wing (CA ANG) (F-16C/D, C-26B) (Fresno Yosemite AIP, CA)
        - Detachment 1 (CA ANG) (F-16C/D) (March ARB, CA)
      - 148th Fighter Wing (MN ANG) (F-16A/B, C-26B) (Duluth IAP, MN)
  - (11th Air Force / Alaska NORAD Region (Elmendorf AFB, AK))
    - (611th Air and Space Operations Center (Elmendorf AFB, AK))
    - (176th Air Control Squadron/Alaskan Air Defense Sector (AK ANG) (Elmendorf AFB, AK))
  - (1 Canadian Air Division/Canadian NORAD Region (Winnipeg, MB))
- US Army North / US Army Forces Command (ARNORTH) (Ft Sam Houston, TX)
- Joint Task Force National Capital Region (JTF-NCR) (Ft McNair, DC)
  - 1st and 4th Battalions, 3rd Infantry Regiment (Ft Myer, VA)
  - Military District of Washington (MDW) (Ft McNair, DC)
  - 11th Wing / Air Force District of Washington (Bolling AFB, DC)
  - Naval District Washington (NDW) (Washington Navy Yard, DC)
  - Marine Corps National Capital Region Command (MCNCRC) (MCB Quantico, VA)
- Joint Task Force-Alaska (Elmendorf AFB, AK)
- Joint Task Force North (JTF North, formerly JTF 6)
- Joint Task Force Civil Support (JTF-CS)
- Joint Task Force-Southern Border (JTF-SB)

==== Initiatives ====
- Homeland Defense Academic Symposium
- North American Defense and Security Academic Alliance (NADSAA)
- Women, Peace and Security (WPS)

Source: Our Story

=== Indo-Pacific Command (USINDOPACOM) ===
==== Order of battle ====
- United States Army Pacific (USARPAC)
  - United States Army, Japan
    - 9th Mission Support Command
      - 10th Support Group
  - United States Army Alaska
    - 11th Airborne Division
      - 2nd Infantry Brigade Combat Team (Airborne), 11th Airborne Division
    - 3rd Maneuver Enhancement Brigade
    - 16th Combat Aviation Brigade
  - United States Army Hawaii
  - 25th Infantry Division
  - 196th Infantry Brigade
  - 516th Signal Brigade
- United States Pacific Fleet (PACFLT)
  - 3rd Fleet
    - CTF-30/ Battle Force
    - CTF-31/ Combat Support Force
    - CTF-32/ Patrol and Reconnaissance Force
    - CTF-33/ Logistic Support Force
    - CTF-34/ Submarine Force
    - CTF-35/ Surface Combatant Force
    - CTF-36/ Landing Force
    - CTF-37/ Amphibious Force
    - CTF-38/ Carrier Strike Force
  - 7th Fleet
    - CTF-70/ Battle Force
    - CTF-71/ Combat Support Force
    - CTF-72/ Patrol and Reconnaissance Force
    - CTF-73/ Logistic Support Force
    - CTF-74/ Submarine Force
    - CTF-75/ Surface Combatant Force
    - CTF-76/ Amphibious Force
    - CTF-77/ Carrier Strike Force
    - CTF-79/ Landing Force
  - Naval Surface Forces, United States Pacific Fleet
    - Destroyer Squadron 1
    - Destroyer Squadron 7
    - Destroyer Squadron 15
    - Destroyer Squadron 21
    - Destroyer Squadron 23
    - Destroyer Squadron 28
    - Carrier Strike Group 1
    - Carrier Strike Group 3
    - Carrier Strike Group 5
    - Carrier Strike Group 7
    - Carrier Strike Group 9
    - Carrier Strike Group 11
    - Carrier Strike Group 15
    - Surface Group PACNORWEST
    - Surface Group MIDPAC
    - Logistics Group WESTPAC
    - Amphibious Group 1
    - Amphibious Group 3
    - Explosive Ordnance Disposal Group 1
  - Naval Submarine Forces, United States Pacific Fleet
    - Submarine Group 7
    - Submarine Group 9
  - Naval Air Forces, United States Pacific Fleet
    - Fleet Air, West Pacific
    - Airborne Early Warning Wing
      - VAW-112
      - VAW-113
      - VAW-115
      - VAW-116
      - VAW-117
      - VRC-30
  - Navy Region Southwest
  - Navy Region Northwest
  - Navy Region Hawaii
  - Coast Guard Pacific Area / Maritime Defense Zone Pacific
  - Joint Region Marianas
  - United States Naval Forces Marianas
- Marine Forces Pacific (MARFORPAC)
  - I Marine Expeditionary Force (I MEF)
    - I Marine Expeditionary Force Headquarters Group (I MEF HQ GRP)
    - 3rd Marine Division (3rd MARDIV)
    - 1st Marine Aircraft Wing (1st MAW)
    - 1st Marine Logistics Group (1st MLG)
    - 3rd Marine Expeditionary Brigade (3rd MEB)
    - 31st Marine Expeditionary Unit (31st MEU)
  - III Marine Expeditionary Force (III MEF)
    - III Marine Expeditionary Force Headquarters Group (III MEF HQ GRP)
    - 1st Marine Division (1st MARDIV)
    - 3rd Marine Aircraft Wing (3rd MAW)
    - 3rd Marine Logistics Group (3rd MLG)
    - 1st Marine Expeditionary Brigade (1st MEB)
    - 11th Marine Expeditionary Unit (11th MEU)
    - 13th Marine Expeditionary Unit (13th MEU)
    - 15th Marine Expeditionary Unit (15th MEU)
- Pacific Air Forces (PACAF)
- United States Forces Japan (USFJ)
  - United States Army Japan
  - Fifth Air Force
  - United States Naval Forces Japan (CNFJ/CNRJ)
- United States Forces Korea (USFK)
  - Eighth United States Army
  - Seventh Air Force/Air Forces Korea
  - United States Naval Forces Korea
  - United States Marine Forces Korea
  - United States Space Forces Korea
  - Special Operations Command Korea
- Special Operations Command Pacific (SOCPAC)
- Asia-Pacific Center for Security Studies
- Information Systems Support Activity
- Pacific Automated Server Site Japan
- Cruise Missile Support Activity
- Special Intelligence Communications
- Joint Intelligence Center Pacific
- Joint Intelligence Training Activity Pacific
- Joint Interagency Task Force West (JIATF West)
- Joint Task Force Full-Accounting
- Space Forces - Indo-Pacific (USSPACEFOR-INDOPAC)
- Center for Excellence in Disaster Management & Humanitarian Assistance (CFE-DM)

Source: USINDOPACOM Components

=== Southern Command (USSOUTHCOM) ===
- United States Army South (Fort Sam Houston, TX) (ARSOUTH)
  - 1st Battalion, 228th Aviation Regiment (Soto Cano AB, Honduras)
  - 56th Signal Battalion (Fort Sam Houston, TX)
- United States Naval Forces Southern Command (Naval Station Mayport, FL) (USNAVSO)
  - Naval Surface Group Two
  - Destroyer Squadron Six
  - Destroyer Squadron Fourteen
- II Marine Expeditionary Force (II MEF)/ United States Marine Corps Forces, South (Camp Lejeune, NC) (MARFORSOUTH)
  - II Marine Expeditionary Force Headquarters Group (II MEF HQ GRP)
  - 2nd Marine Division (2nd MARDIV)
  - 2nd Marine Aircraft Wing (2nd MAW)
  - 2nd Marine Logistics Group (2nd MLG)
  - 2nd Marine Expeditionary Brigade (2nd MEB)
  - 22nd Marine Expeditionary Unit (22nd MEU)
  - 24th Marine Expeditionary Unit (24th MEU)
  - 26th Marine Expeditionary Unit (26th MEU)
  - Air Contingency Marine Air Ground Task Force
- Twelfth Air Force/ United States Southern Command Air Forces (Davis Monthan AFB, AZ)
  - 7th Bomb Wing
  - 28th Bomb Wing
  - 49th Fighter Wing
  - 355th Wing
  - 366th Wing
  - 388th Fighter Wing
  - 1st Air Support Operations Group
  - 3rd Combat Communications Group
  - 612th Air Operation Group
  - 820th RED HORSE Squadron
- Special Operations Command South (SOCSOUTH)
- Southern Surveillance Reconnaissance Operations Center
- Joint Interagency Task Force South
- Joint Task Force Guantanamo (Guantanamo Bay, Cuba)
- Joint Task Force Bravo (Soto Cano AB, Honduras)
  - 612th Air Base Squadron
  - Army Forces
  - Medical Elements
  - 1st Battalion, 228th Aviation Regiment
  - Joint Security Forces

==== Direct Reporting Units ====
- Western Hemisphere Institute for Security Cooperation
- Naval * Small Craft Instruction & Technical Training School
- Inter American Air Forces Academy

Source: About us

=== Space Command (USSPACECOM) ===
- Army Space and Missile Defense Command (USASMDC)
- Marine Corps Forces Space Command
- Navy Space Command
- Air Forces Space
- United States Space Forces – Space (S4S)
  - Combined Space Operations Center (CSpOC), Vandenberg Space Force Base
  - Missile Warning Center (MWC), Cheyenne Mountain Space Force Station
  - Joint Overhead Persistent Infrared Center (JOPC), Buckley Space Force Base
  - Joint Navigation Warfare Center (JNWC), Kirtland AFB
  - National Space Defense Center (NSDC)
  - Space Delta 5
  - Space Delta 15
- Joint Functional Component Command for Missile Defense for Missile Defense

Source: Warfighting Units

== Service component commands ==
=== Army Forces Command (FORSCOM) ===
- I Corps
  - 2nd Brigade Combat Team, 2nd Infantry Division (Stryker brigade), Joint Base Lewis-McChord
  - 3rd Brigade Combat Team, 2nd Infantry Division (Stryker brigade), Fort Lewis
  - 17th Field Artillery Brigade, Fort Lewis
  - Military Intelligence Brigade, Fort Lewis
  - 555th Engineer Brigade, Fort Lewis
  - 593rd Expeditionary Sustainment Command, Fort Lewis
    - 42nd Military Police Brigade, Fort Lewis
    - 62nd Medical Brigade, Fort Lewis
- III Corps (United States) (Fort Hood, TX)
  - 1st Armored Division, Fort Bliss
  - 1st Cavalry Division, Fort Hood
  - 1st Infantry Division, Fort Riley
  - 4th Infantry Division, Fort Carson
  - 3rd Cavalry Regiment, Fort Hood
  - III Corps Artillery, Fort Sill
    - 41st Fires Brigade, Fort Hood
    - 75th Fires Brigade, Fort Sill
    - 212th Fires Brigade, Fort Bliss
    - 214th Fires Brigade, Fort Sill
  - 36th Engineer Brigade, Fort Hood
  - 504th Battlefield Surveillance Brigade, Fort Hood
  - 89th Military Police Brigade, Fort Hood
  - 13th Sustainment Command, Fort Hood
- XVIII Airborne Corps (Fort Bragg, NC)
  - 3rd Infantry Division, Fort Stewart
  - 10th Mountain Division (Light Infantry), Fort Drum
  - 82nd Airborne Division, Fort Bragg
  - 101st Airborne Division (Air Assault), Fort Campbell
  - 18th Fires Brigade, Fort Bragg
  - 20th Engineer Brigade, Fort Bragg
  - 525th Battlefield Surveillance Brigade, Fort Bragg
  - 16th Military Police Brigade, Fort Bragg
  - 44th Medical Brigade, Fort Bragg
- 32nd Army Air & Missile Defense Command (Ft Bliss, TX)
  - 11th Air Defense Artillery Brigade (Ft Bliss, TX)
  - 31st Air Defense Artillery Brigade (Fort Sill, OK)
  - 35th Air Defense Artillery Brigade (Osan AB, South Korea)
  - 69th Air Defense Artillery Brigade (Fort Hood, TX)
  - 108th Air Defense Artillery Brigade (Fort Bragg, NC)
  - Detachment 1 (FL ARNG) (Orlando, FL)
- Network Enterprise Technology Command (NETCOM) / 9th Army Signal Command (Ft Huachuca, AZ)
  - 11th Signal Brigade (Ft Huachuca, AZ)
  - 21st Signal Brigade (Ft Detrick, MD)
  - 5th Signal Command (Mannheim, Germany)
  - 311th Signal Command (United States)(Multi-Component) (Ft Shafter, HI)
    - 1st Signal Brigade (Seoul, South Korea)
  - 335th Theater Signal Command (USAR) (East Point, GA (Deployed to Kuwait))
    - 160th Signal Brigade (Strategic) (Camp Arifjan, Kuwait)
  - 93rd Signal Brigade (Ft Gordon, GA)
  - 516th Signal Brigade (Ft Shafter, HI)
- 52nd Ordnance Group (Ft Campbell, KY)
- 111th Ordnance Group (AL ARNG) (Ft Gillem, GA)
- National Training Center (NTC) (Ft Irwin, CA)
  - 11th Armored Cavalry Regiment (OPFOR) (Ft Irwin, CA)
- Joint Readiness Training Center (JRTC) (Ft Polk, LA)
  - Warrior Brigade (Support) (Ft Polk, LA)
- 1st Army (Rock Island Arsenol, IL)
  - First Army Division East (Ft Meade, MD)
    - 157th Infantry Brigade "Spartan" (Fort Jackson, SC)
    - 158th Infantry Brigade "Warrior" (Patrick Space Force Base, FL)
    - 174th Infantry Brigade "Patriot" (Fort Drum, NY)
    - 188th Infantry Brigade "Battle Ready" (Fort Stewart, GA)
    - 205th Infantry Brigade "Bayonet" (Camp Atterbury, IN)
    - 177th Armored Brigade "Mudcats" (Camp Shelby, MS)
    - 4th Cavalry Brigade "Saber" (Fort Knox, KY)
    - 72nd Field Artillery Brigade "Warrior Eagle" (Fort Meade, MD)
  - First Army Division West (Fort Hood, TX)
    - 120th Infantry Brigade (Fort Hood, TX)
    - 166th Aviation Brigade (Fort Hood, TX)
    - 181st Infantry Brigade "Eagle" (Fort McCoy, WI)
    - 191st Infantry Brigade (Fort Lewis, WA)
    - 402nd Field Artillery Brigade (Fort Bliss, TX)
    - 479th Field Artillery Brigade (Fort Hood, TX)
    - 5th Armored Brigade (Fort Bliss, TX)
    - 189th Infantry Brigade "Bayonet" (Fort Hood, TX)
  - 28th Infantry Division (Mechanized) (PA ARNG) (Harrisburg, PA)
  - 34th Infantry Division (Medium) (MN ARNG) (Rosemount, MN)
  - 35th Infantry Division (Mechanized) (KS ARNG) (Ft Leavenworth, KS)
  - 38th Infantry Division (Mechanized) (IN ARNG) (Indianapolis, IN)
  - 42nd Infantry Division (Mechanized) (NY ARNG) (Troy, NY)
  - 29th Infantry Division (VA ARNG) (Ft Belvoir, VA)
  - 155th Armored Brigade Combat Team (MS ARNG) (Tupelo, MS)
  - 27th Infantry Brigade (Light) (Enhanced Readiness) (NY ARNG) (Syracuse, NY)
  - 32nd Infantry Brigade (Light) (WI ARNG) (Madison, WI)
  - 76th Infantry Brigade (Light) (Enhanced Readiness) (IN ARNG) (Indianapolis, IN)
  - 256th Infantry Brigade (Mechanized) (Enhanced Readiness) (LA ARNG) (Lafayette, LA)
  - 631st Field Artillery Brigade (MS ARNG) (Grenada, MS)
  - 168th Engineer Group (MS ARNG) (Vicksburg, MS)
  - 43rd Military Police Brigade (RI ARNG) (Warwick, RI)
  - 244th Theater Aviation Brigade (Lift) (USAR) (Ft Sheridan, IL)
  - 31st Chemical Brigade (AL ARNG) (Northport, AL)
  - 228th Signal Brigade (SC ARNG) (Spartanburg, SC)
  - 261st Signal Brigade (DE ARNG) (Dover, DE)
  - 184th Transportation Group (Composite) (MS ARNG) (Laurel, MS)
  - 78th Division (Training Support) (USAR) (Ft Dix, NJ)
  - 85th Division (Training Support) (USAR) (Arlington Heights, IL)
  - 87th Division (Exercise) (USAR) (Birmingham, AL)
  - 36th Infantry Division (Mechanized) (TX ARNG) (Austin, TX)
  - 57th Field Artillery Brigade (WI ARNG) (Milwaukee, WI)
  - 115th Engineer Group (Construction) (UT ARNG) (Draper, UT)
  - 300th Military Intelligence Brigade (Linguist) (UT ARNG) (Draper, UT)
  - 75th Division (Training Support) (USAR) (Ft Sam Houston, TX)
  - 91st Division (Training Support) (USAR) (Ft. Baker, CA)
  - 67th Maneuver Enhancement Brigade (NE ARNG) (Lincoln, NE)
  - United States Army Reserve Command (USARC) (Ft Bragg, NC)
  - 63rd Regional Support Command (USAR) (Los Alamitos, CA)
    - 104th Division (Institutional Training) (USAR) (Vancouver Bks, WA)
    - 653rd Regional Support Group (USAR) (Moreno Valley, CA)
    - 2nd Medical Brigade (USAR) (Hamilton Field, CA)
  - 70th Regional Readiness Command (USAR) (Ft Lawton, WA)
    - 654th Area Support Group (Tumwater, WA)
  - 77th Regional Readiness Command (USAR) (Ft Totten, NY)
    - 800th Military Police Brigade (Enemy Prisoner of War) (USAR) (Uniondale, NY)
    - 455th Chemical Brigade (USAR) (Ft Dix, NJ)
    - 98th Division (Institutional Training) (USAR) (Rochester, NY)
    - 301st Area Support Group (USAR) (Flushing, NY)
    - 8th Medical Brigade (USAR) (Ft Wadsworth, NY)
  - 77th Infantry Division (Reinforcement Training Unit) (USAR) (Ft Totten, NY)
  - 81st Regional Readiness Command (USAR) (Fort Jackson, SC)
    - 100th Division (Institutional Training) (USAR) (Louisville, KY)
    - 108th Division (Institutional Training) (USAR) (Charlotte, NC)
    - 926th Engineer Group (USAR) (Montgomery, AL)
    - 415th Chemical Brigade (USAR) (Greenville, SC)
    - 81st Regional Support Group (USAR) (Ft Jackson, SC)
    - 171st Area Support Group (USAR) (Garner, NC)
    - 640th Area Support Group (USAR) (Nashville, TN)
    - 641st Area Support Group (USAR) (St Petersburg, FL)
    - 642nd Area Support Group (USAR) (Ft Gordon, GA)
    - 1st Headquarters Brigade (USAR) (Nashville, TN)
    - 332nd Medical Brigade (USAR) (Nashville, TN)
    - 5th Medical Group (USAR) (Birmingham, AL)
  - 88th Regional Readiness Command (USAR) (Fort McCoy, WI)
    - 84th Division (Institutional Training) (USAR) (Milwaukee, WI)
    - 300th Military Police Command (USAR) (Inkster, MI)
    - 303rd Ordnance Group (USAR) (Springfield, IL)
    - 88th Regional Readiness Group (USAR) (Indianapolis, IN)
    - 643rd Regional Support Group (USAR) (Whitehall, OH)
    - 645th Regional Support Group (USAR) (Southfield, MI)
    - 646th Regional Support Group (USAR) (Madison, WI)
    - 330th Medical Brigade (USAR) (Ft Sheridan, IL)
  - 89th Regional Readiness Command (USAR) (Wichita, KS)
    - 95th Division (Institutional Training) (USAR) (Oklahoma City, OK)
    - 166th Aviation Brigade (Training Support) (Ft Riley, KS)
    - 561st Corps Support Group (USAR) (Omaha, NE)
    - 917th Corps Support Group (USAR) (Belton, MO)
    - 326th Area Support Group (USAR) (Kansas City, KS)
    - 648th Area Support Group (USAR) (St Louis, MO)
    - 331st Medical Group (USAR) (Wichita, KS)
  - 90th Regional Readiness Command (USAR) (Little Rock AFB, AR)
    - 647th Regional Support Group (USAR) (El Paso, TX)
    - 90th Regional Support Group (USAR) (San Antonio, TX)
  - 94th Regional Readiness Command (USAR) Devens RFTA, MA (inactivated; number assigned to the 94th Division (Force Sustainment), Fort Lee, VA)
    - 167th Area Support Group (USAR) (Manchester, NH)
    - 804th Medical Brigade (USAR) (Devens RFTA, MA)
  - 96th Regional Readiness Command (USAR) (Ft Douglas, UT)
  - 99th Regional Readiness Command (USAR) (Moon Township, PA)
    - 220th Military Police Brigade (USAR) (Gaithersburg, MD)
    - 367th Military Police Group (USAR) (Ashley, PA)
    - 80th Division (Institutional Training) (USAR) (Richmond, VA)
    - 38th Ordnance Group (USAR) (Charleston, WV)
    - 464th Chemical Brigade (USAR) (Johnstown, PA)
    - 475th Quartermaster Group (Petroleum & Water) (USAR) (Farrell, PA)
    - 656th Area Support Group (USAR) (NAS Willow Grove, PA)
    - 309th Medical Group (USAR) (Rockville, MD)
    - 99th Headquarters Brigade (USAR) (Willow Grove, PA)

=== Air Force Air Combat Command (ACC) (Langley AFB, VA) ===
- 1st Air Force (Tyndall AFB, FL)
- 15th Air Force (Shaw AFB, SC)
  - 1st Fighter Wing (F-15C/D) (Langley AFB, VA)
  - 33rd Fighter Wing (F-15C/D) (Eglin AFB, FL)
  - 4th Fighter Wing (F-15E) (Seymour Johnson AFB, NC)
  - 20th Fighter Wing (SEAD) (F-16CJ/DJ) (Shaw AFB, SC)
  - 820th Security Forces Group (Moody AFB, GA)
  - 5th Combat Communications Group (Robins AFB, GA)
- 12th Air Force (Davis-Monthan AFB, AZ)
  - 7th Bomb Wing (B-1B) (Dyess AFB, TX)
  - 28th Bomb Wing (B-1B) (Ellsworth AFB, SD)
  - 366th Fighter Wing (Fighter and Bomber) (B-1B, F-15C/D/E, F-16CJ/DJ, KC-135R) (Mountain Home AFB, ID)
  - 388th Fighter Wing (F-16CG/DJ) (Hill AFB, UT)
  - 27th Fighter Wing (F-16CG/DG) (Cannon AFB, NM)
  - 301st Fighter Wing (AFRes) (F-16C/D) (NAS Fort Worth JRB, TX)
  - 49th Fighter Wing (F-117A, AT-38B, T-38A) (Holloman AFB, NM)
  - 355th Wing (Fighter and Electronic Countermeasures) (OA/A-10A, EC-130E/H) (Davis-Monthan AFB, AZ)
  - 507th Air Refueling Wing (AFRes) (KC-135R, E-3B/C, TC-18E) (Tinker AFB, OK)
- 10th Air Force (AFRes) (NAS Fort Worth JRB, TX)
  - 917th Wing (Fighter and Bomber) (AFRes) (B-52H, OA/A-10A) (Barksdale, AFB)
  - 419th Fighter Wing (AFRes) (F-16C/D) (Hill AFB, UT)
  - 482d Fighter Wing (AFRes) (F-16C/D) (Homestead ARB, FL)
  - 442d Fighter Wing (AFRes) (OA/A-10A) (Whiteman AFB, MO)
  - 926th Fighter Wing (AFRes) (OA/A-10A) (NAS New Orleans JRB, TX)
  - 920th Rescue Wing (AFRes) (HC-130P, C-130E, HH-60G) (Patrick Space Force Base, FL)
- Air Warfare Center (Nellis AFB, NV)
  - 53rd Wing (Test and Evaluation) (F-15C/D/E, F-16C/CG/CJ/D/DG/DJ, F-117A, OA/A-10A, E-9A, Boeing 707, QF-4E/G, QRF-4C, HH-60G) (Eglin AFB, FL)
  - 57th Wing (Combat Training, Test and Evaluation) (F-15C/D/E, F-16C/CG/CJ/D/DG/DJ, OA/A-10A, HH-60G, RQ-1A) (Nellis AFB, NV)
  - 505th Command and Control Wing (Hurlburt Field, FL)
  - 99th Air Base Wing (Nellis AFB, NV)
- Air National Guard (ANG)
  - 131st Fighter Wing (MO ANG) (F-15A/B) (Lambert Fd, St Louis, MO)
  - 159th Fighter Wing (LA ANG) (F-15A/B, C-130E) (NAS New Orleans JRB, LA)
  - 113th Wing (Fighter & Airlift) (DC ANG) (F-16C/D, C-21A, C-38A) (Andrews AFB, MD)
  - 114th Fighter Wing (SD ANG) (F-16C/D) (Joes Foss Fd, Sioux Falls, SD)
  - 115th Fighter Wing (WI ANG) (F-16C/D, C-26B) (Dane CAP, Truax Fd, WI)
  - 122nd Fighter Wing (IN ANG) (F-16C/D) (Fort Wayne MAP, IN)
  - 127th Wing (Fighter and Airlift) (MI ANG) (F-16C/D, C-130E, C-26B) (Selfridge ANBG, MI)
  - 132nd Fighter Wing (IA ANG) (F-16CG/DG) (Des Moines MAP, IA)
  - 138th Fighter Wing (OK ANG) (F-16CG/DG) (Tulsa IAP, OK)
  - 140th Wing (Fighter & Training) (CO ANG) (F-16C/D, C-21A, C-26A) (Buckley Space Force Base, CO)
  - 150th Fighter Wing (NM ANG) (F-16C/CG/D/DG, C-26B) (Kirtland AFB, NM)
  - 174th Reconnaissance Wing (NY ANG) (M-9 Reaper) (Syracuse-Hancock Fd, NY)
  - 177th Fighter Wing (NJ ANG) (F-16C/D) (Atlantic City IAP, NJ)
  - 180th Fighter Wing (OH ANG) (F-16CG/DG) (Toledo Express AP, OH)
  - 181st Intelligence Wing (IN ANG) (Hulman Fd, Terre Haute, IN)
  - 183rd Fighter Wing (IL ANG) (F-16C/D) (Capitol AP, Springfield, IL)
  - 187th Fighter Wing (AL ANG) (F-16C/D, C-26B) (Montgomery-Dannelly Fd, AL)
  - 188th Fighter Wing (AR ANG) (F-16C/D) (Ft Rock MAP, AR)
  - 192nd Fighter Wing (VA ANG) (F-16C/D) (Richard E Byrd IAP, VA)
  - 169th Fighter Wing (SEAD) (SC ANG) (F-16CJ/D, C-130E) (McEntire ANGB, SC)
  - 103d Airlift Wing (CT ANG) (O/A-10A) (Bradley ANGB, CT)
  - 104th Fighter Wing (MA ANG) (O/A-10A) (Barnes MAP, Westfield, MA)
  - 110th Fighter Wing (MI ANG) (O/A-10A) (Battle Creek ANGB, MI)
  - 111th Attack Wing (PA ANG) (MQ9 Reaper) (Horsham AGS, PA)
  - 124th Wing (ID ANG) (O/A-10A) (Boise AT, ID)
  - 175th Wing (Fighter and Airlift) (MD ANG) (OA/A-10A) (Glenn L Martin AP, Baltimore, MD)
  - 106th Rescue Wing (NY ANG) (HC-130N/P, HH-60G) (Francis Gabreski ANGB, NY)
  - 129th Rescue Wing (CA ANG) (HC-130P, HH-60G) (NAS Moffett Fd, CA)
  - 147th Reconnaissance Wing (TX ANG) (MQ-1 Predator) (Ellington ANGB, Houston, TX)
  - 163rd Reconnaissance Wing (CA ANG) (MQ-1 Predator) (March AFB, CA)
  - 102nd Intelligence Wing (MA ANG) (Otis ANGB, Falmouth, MA)
  - 184th Intelligence Wing (KS ANG) (McConnell AFB, KS)

=== Fleet Forces Command (USFFC) (Norfolk NB, VA) ===
- 2nd Fleet (NB Norfolk, VA)
  - Task Force 20 (2nd Fleet Battle Force)
    - Theodore Roosevelt Strike Group / Carrier Strike Group 2 (CARSTRKGRU 2) (USS Theodore Roosevelt (CVN-71)) (NB Norfolk, VA (Surge Ready))
    - Harry S. Truman Strike Group / Carrier Strike Group 10 (CARSTRKGRU 10) (USS Harry S. Truman (CVN-75)) (NB Norfolk, VA (Post-Deployment))
    - John F. Kennedy Strike Group / Carrier Strike Group 6 (CARSTRKGRU 6) (USS John F. Kennedy (CV-67)) (NS Mayport, FL (Post-Deployment))
    - Eisenhower Strike Group / Carrier Strike Group 8 (CARSTRKGRU 8) (USS Dwight D. Eisenhower (CVN-69)) (NB Norfolk, VA (Basic Training))
    - Enterprise Strike Group / Carrier Strike Group 12 (CARSTRKGRU 12) (USS Enterprise (CVN-65)) (NB Norfolk, VA (Maintenance))
    - George Washington Strike Group (USS George Washington (CVN-73)) (NB Norfolk, VA (Maintenance))
    - Carrier Strike Group 14 (CARSTRKGRU 14) (NB Norfolk, VA)
  - Task Force 21 (2nd Fleet Patrol Reconnaissance Force) / Patrol and Reconnaissance Force Atlantic Fleet (PATRECONFORLANT) (NS Norfolk, VA)
  - Task Force 22 (2nd Fleet Amphibious Force) / Amphibious Group 2 (PHIBGRU 2) (NB Norfolk, VA)
    - Kearsarge Expeditionary Strike Group / Expeditionary Strike Group 6 / Amphibious Squadron 8 (PHIBRON 8) (USS Kearsarge (LHD-3)) (NB Norfolk, VA (Deployed))
    - Saipan Expeditionary Strike Group / Expeditionary Strike Group 4 / Amphibious Squadron 2 (PHIBRON 2) (USS Saipan (LHA-2)) (NB Norfolk, VA (Deployed))
    - Wasp Expeditionary Strike Group / Expeditionary Strike Group 2 / Amphibious Squadron 4 (PHIBRON 4) (USS Wasp (LHD-1)) (NB Norfolk, VA (Post-Deployment))
    - Bataan Expeditionary Strike Group (USS Bataan (LHD-5)) (NAB Little Creek, VA (Intermediate Training))
    - Naval Coastal Warfare Group Two (Williamsburg, VA)
    - Tactical Air Control Group 2 (TACGRU 2) (NAB Little Creek, VA)
    - Naval Beach Group 2 (NAVBEACHGRU 2) (NB Norfolk, VA?)
  - Task Force 23 (2nd Fleet Landing Force)
  - Task Force 24 (2nd Fleet ASW Force)
  - Task Force 25 (2nd Fleet Mobile Logistics Support Force) / Combat Logistics Squadron 2 (LOGRON 2) (NB Norfolk, VA)
  - Task Force 26 (2nd Fleet Patrol Air Force) / Patrol and Reconnaissance Force Atlantic Fleet (PATRECONFORLANT) (NS Norfolk, VA)
  - Task Force 28 (2nd Fleet Caribbean Contingency Force) (NS Mayport, FL)
  - Carrier Group 4 (CARGRU 4) / Carrier Striking Force (Battle Group Training) (NB Norfolk, VA)
- Task Force 40 / Naval Surface Force Atlantic Fleet (NAVSURFLANT) (NB Norfolk, VA)
  - Combat Logistics Squadron 2 (COMLOGRON 2) (NWS Earle, NJ)
- Task Force 41 / Naval Air Force Atlantic Fleet (NAVAIRLANT) (NAS Oceana, VA)
  - Fighter Wing Atlantic Fleet (FITWINGLANT) (NAS Oceana, VA)
  - Strike Fighter Wing Atlantic Fleet (STRIKFIGHTWINGLANT) (NAS Oceana, VA)
  - Sea Control Wing Atlantic Fleet (SEACONWINGLANT) (NAS Jacksonville, FL)
  - Helicopter Anti-Submarine Wing Atlantic Fleet (HSWINGLANT) (NAS Jacksonville, FL)
  - Helicopter Anti-Submarine Light Wing Atlantic Fleet (HSLWINGLANT) (NS Mayport, FL)
  - Helicopter Sea Combat Wing Atlantic Fleet (HELSEACOMWINGLANT) (NAS Norfolk, VA)
    - Helicopter Sea Combat Squadron TWO (HSC-2) (NAS Norfolk, VA)
    - Helicopter Sea Combat Squadron TWENTY TWO (HSC-22) (NAS Norfolk, VA)
    - Helicopter Sea Combat Squadron TWENTY SIX (HSC-26) (NAS Norfolk, VA)
    - Helicopter Sea Combat Squadron TWENTY EIGHT (HSC-28) (NAS Norfolk, VA)
    - Helicopter Sea Combat Squadron EIGHTY FOUR (HSC-84) (NAS Norfolk, VA)
    - Helicopter Mine Countermeasures Squadron FOURTEEN (HM-14) (NAS Norfolk, VA)
    - Helicopter Mine Countermeasures Squadron FIFTEEN (HM-15) (NAS Corpus Christi, TX)
    - Airborne Mine Countermeasures Weapon Systems Training School (AMCMWPNSYSTRASCOL) (NAS Norfolk, VA)
    - Helicopter Sea Combat Weapons School Atlantic (HSCWEPSCOLANT) (NAS Norfolk, VA)
  - Airborne Early Warning Wing Atlantic Fleet (AEWWINGLANT) (NAS Norfolk, VA)
  - Reserve Carrier Air Wing 20 (CVWR 20) (NAS Atlanta, GA)
- Task Force 42 / Naval Submarine Force Atlantic Fleet (NAVSUBLANT) (NB Norfolk, VA)
  - Submarine Group 2 (SUBGRU 2) (NSB New London, CT)
    - Naval Submarine Support Center (NB Norfolk, VA)
- Task Force 43 (Training Command Atlantic Fleet?)
- Task Force 44 (Coast Guard Force Atlantic Fleet) / Coast Guard Atlantic Area (Portsmouth, VA)
- Task Force 45 / Fleet Marine Forces Atlantic (MARFORLANT) (Norfolk NB, VA)
- Task Force 46 (Mine Warfare Command Atlantic Fleet (MINEWARCOM)) (USS Inchon (MCS-12)) (NS Ingleside, TX)
- Task Force 48 (Naval Construction Battalions Atlantic Fleet) (NAB Little Creek, VA)
- Task Force 80 (Naval Patrol and Protection of Shipping Atlantic Fleet)
- Task Force 81 (Sea Control and Surveillance Force Atlantic Fleet) / Patrol and Reconnaissance Force Atlantic Fleet (PATRECONFORLANT) (NS Norfolk, VA)
- Task Force 82 (Amphibious Task Force)
- Task Force 83 (Landing Force (II Marine Expeditionary Force (II MEF)) (Camp Lejeune, NC)
- Task Force 84 (ASW Force Atlantic Fleet) / Naval Submarine Force Atlantic Fleet (NAVSUBLANT) (NB Norfolk, VA)
- Task Force 85 (Mobile Logistics Support Force Atlantic Fleet) / Combat Logistics Squadron 2 (LOGRON 2) (NB Norfolk, VA)
- Task Force 86 (Patrol Air Force Atlantic Fleet) / Patrol and Reconnaissance Force Atlantic Fleet (PATRECONFORLANT) (NS Norfolk, VA)
  - Patrol and Reconnaissance Wing 5 (PATRECONWING 5) (NAS Brunswick, ME)
  - Patrol and Reconnaissance Wing 11 (PATRECONWING 11) (NAS Jacksonville, FL)
  - Reserve Patrol Wing (RESPATWING) (NAS Oceana, VA)
- Task Force 87 (Tactical Development and Evaluation and Transit Force Atlantic Fleet)
- Task Force 88 (Training Force Atlantic Fleet) (NB Norfolk, VA)
- Task Force 89 (Maritime Defense Zone Atlantic Fleet) (USCGS Portsmouth, VA)
- Task Force 125 (Naval Surface Group 2 (NAVSURFGRU 2)) (NS Mayport, FL)
- Task Force 137 (Naval Forces Eastern Atlantic) (Naples, Italy)
- Task Force 138 (Naval Forces South Atlantic)
- Task Force 139 (Multilateral Special Operations Force)
- Task Force 142 (Operational Test and Evaluation Force) (NB Norfolk, VA)

=== Marine Corps Forces Command (COMMARFORCOM) (Norfolk NB, VA) ===
- II Marine Expeditionary Force (II MEF) (Camp Lejeune, NC)
  - II Marine Expeditionary Force Headquarters Group (II MEF HQ GRP)
  - 2nd Marine Division (2nd MARDIV) (Camp Lejeune, NC)
  - 2nd Marine Aircraft Wing (2nd MAW) (MCAS Cherry Point, NC)
  - 2nd Marine Logistics Group (2nd MLG) (Camp Lejeune, NC)
  - 2nd Marine Expeditionary Brigade (2nd MEB) (Camp Lejeune, NC)
    - 22nd Marine Expeditionary Unit (22nd MEU)
    - 24th Marine Expeditionary Unit (24th MEU)
    - 26th Marine Expeditionary Unit (26th MEU)
  - Marine Corps Security Force Regiment (MCSFR)
  - Marine Corps Security Cooperation Group (MCSCG)
  - Chemical Biological Incident Response Force (CBIRF)
- Marine Forces Reserve (MARFORRES) (New Orleans, LA)
  - Force Headquarters Group (MARFORRES HQ GRP) (New Orleans, LA)
  - 4th Marine Division (4th MARDIV) (MARFORRES) (New Orleans, LA)
  - 4th Marine Aircraft Wing (4th MAW) (MARFORRES) (New Orleans, LA)
  - 4th Marine Logistics Group (4th MLG) (MARFORRES) (New Orleans, LA)

=== U.S. Forces Azores (USAFORAZ) (Lajes Field, Azores) ===
- 65th Air Base Wing (Lajes Field, Azores)

Source: Combatant Commands

== See also ==
- United States Army
- United States Marine Corps
- United States Navy
- United States Air Force
- United States Space Force
- Special Activities Center - conducts covert operations outside the umbrella of the Department of Defense
