= Office of Local Defense Community Cooperation =

US government agency

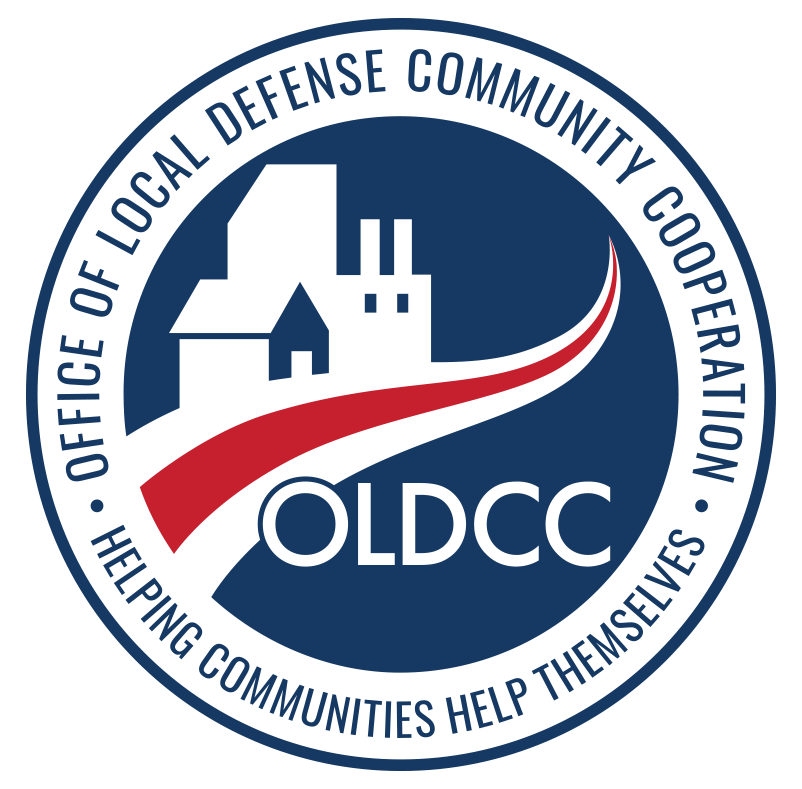
- Seal of OLDCC

Agency overview
- Formed: 1961; 65 years ago (as Office of Economic Adjustment), became OLDCC on January 1, 2021
- Jurisdiction: Federal government of the United States, mainly near US military bases
- Headquarters: Arlington County, Virginia; 38°49′14″N 77°3′2″W
- Agency executive: Patrick J. O'Brien, Director of the OLDCC
- Parent department: United States Department of Defense
- Website: oldcc.gov

The Office of Local Defense Community Cooperation (OLDCC), formerly the Office of Economic Adjustment (OEA), is a United States Department of Defense (DoD) field activity and provides technical and financial assistance to states, territories, and communities that are invested in the defense mission. OLDCC assistance supports the readiness and resiliency of both defense installations and defense communities.

To assist affected communities, OLDCC manages and directs the Defense Economic Adjustment Program and coordinates the involvement of other federal agencies.

== History ==
Founded in 1961 under President John F. Kennedy and Defense Secretary Robert McNamara, the Office of Economic Adjustment (OEA), later the Office of Local Defense Community Cooperation (OLDCC), was tasked with mitigating the adverse impact on jobs and local economies after the government cost-reduction programs enacted during the Kennedy administration closed several military bases across the United States. In the late-1960s and early-70s, OEA opened regional offices in major cities nationwide to facilitate federal grant deliveries.

In the 1980s, OEA phased out categorical grants (grants with these specific categories upon which they can be spent) in favor of block grants (grants with few or no conditions on spending). Regional assistance waned and all OEA offices not on the West Coast were shuttered. Due to the Cold War military buildup initiated during the Reagan administration, no major military bases in the United States were closed during the 1980s.

In 1988, with Cold War tensions diminishing, a new base closure statute was enacted which was designed to shield the process from political manipulation (Pork barrel politics, i.e. congressional members ensuring bases in their states or districts remained open for political gain, as had historically been the case). The law set up a bipartisan commission that channeled base closure or realignment recommendations to the president; in 1988, approximately 100 bases were selected for closure and 50 realigned.

As a result of the Base Realignment and Closure (BRAC) process developed in the late-1980s and 1990s, OEA provided support to many local communities amidst military force reductions and defense industry cutbacks. OEA's success served as a model for communities within former Soviet States and new Eastern European countries to better cope with reductions in former Soviet Union and former Warsaw Pact military spending brought about by the end of the Cold War and the dissolution of the Soviet Union.

In 2013, military operations partially subsided as a result of budget sequestration (spending cuts) imposed by the Budget Control Act of 2011, harming Defense Department-dependent states and communities. Seeking to avert similar economic slowdowns, OEA Director Patrick O'Brien began issuing the “Defense Spending by State” report to help state and local leaders cope with potential loss of military personnel, entire units or installations, and defense contracts through economic diversification or technological innovation. Defense Secretary Leon Panetta pledged to continuing aid to affected communities.

The William M. (Mac) Thornberry National Defense Authorization Act for Fiscal Year 2021 (NDAA FY2021) included a provision (Section 905) that amended Chapter 4 of Title 10 of the United States Code to rename OEA the Office of Local Defense Community Cooperation (OLDCC). The provision took effect upon enactment of the Act on January 1, 2021.

Executive Order 14008, issued by President Joe Biden in early 2021, added addressing climate change to OLDCC's goals. It was subsequently rescinded by President Donald J. Trump via Executive Order 14188 in March 2025.

== Operations ==
The Office of Local Defense Community Cooperation provides technical and financial assistance (referred to as economic adjustment assistance) to states and local communities supporting the mission of the Department of Defense. Such aid is intended to enhance the resiliency and readiness of defense installations and their surrounding communities.

Economic adjustment assistance provides a community-based context for assessing economic hardships caused by DoD program changes by identifying and evaluating alternative courses of action, identifying resource requirements, and assisting in the preparation of an adjustment strategy or action plan to help communities help themselves. Public and private partnerships are employed in areas such as public infrastructure to help local communities, the residents of which are often employed by or otherwise support military installations, and reduce operating costs.

OLDCC employees have a range of experience in economic and community development, land use planning, real estate redevelopment, federal real property programs, military programs, and worker adjustment. Project managers also bring a working knowledge of other federal agencies and their respective programs to help communities put together an adjustment program combining federal, state, local, and private resources.

=== Programs ===
OLDCC operates several programs of assistance aimed at helping local defense-supporting communities:

- Community Noise Mitigation Program: The Community Noise Mitigation Program is designed to address communities impacted by military fixed wing aviation noise for the purposes of installing noise mitigation at covered facilities. Covered facilities are hospitals, daycare facilities, schools, facilities serving senior citizens, and private residences. This program is authorized under the Consolidated Appropriations Act, 2022 (Pub. L. 117-35) Section 8120.
- Defense Community Infrastructure Pilot Program (DCIP): Funds community infrastructure to support defense personnel and families.
- Defense Manufacturing Community Support Program (DMCSP): Supports long-term community investments in national security innovation and defense manufacturing industrial ecosystem capability expansion (i.e. funding research and development in defense-critical technologies).
- Installation Resilience Program: Funds state and local government improvement of installation sustainability (i.e. resilience against natural disasters or adverse environmental changes such as climate change and pollution). Delivers grants to states, private landowners, and others and drafts plans and provides assistance in finding solutions to light pollution, urban sprawl, endangered species management, energy security threats, etc.
- Public Schools on Military Installations (PSMI): An invitation only program based on a Deputy Secretary of Defense prioritization ranking for installations; Funds construction, renovation, repair, and expansion of public schools located on military bases. Despite their location, these schools are operated by local education agencies.
- Mission Realingment Program: After base closures or reductions, deploys project managers to select local redevelopment authorities (LRAs) to represent community members to local, state, and federal agencies. The project manager and LRA develop plans to revitalize the local economy, seek private and public investment, and support affected workers and businesses.

== Organization ==
OLDCC is a Department of Defense field activity under the Office of the Secretary of Defense (OSD); more specifically, within the Office of the Under Secretary of Defense for Acquisition and Sustainment (OUSD(A&S)), and under the purview of the Assistant Secretary of Defense for Energy, Installations and Environment.

While headquartered in Arlington, Virginia, OLDCC retains a Western Regional Office in Sacramento, California headed by the Deputy Director, Western Regional Office.

=== Director ===
The Director of OLDCC is, by statute, appointed by the Under Secretary of Defense for Acquisition and Sustainment and must be a federal civilian employee or private individual with "experience in the interagency in the Executive Branch [and] experience in the administration and management of Federal grants programs." He or she is charged with operating the Office and ensuring appropriate aid is sent to Defense-supporting communities. The director serves ex officio as Executive Director of the Economic Adjustment Committee, a body composed of various federal department heads and other agency leaders or their representatives that coordinates interagency economic assistance in response to Defense program changes.

The current director is Patrick O'Brien, an economic development expert and former HUD employee.

=== Economic Assistance Committee ===
The Economic Adjustment Committee (EAC) is a body composed of various federal department heads and other agency leaders (or their designees) that coordinates interagency economic assistance in response to Defense program changes. It is not a part of OLDCC, but works closely with the Office. With a membership similar to but greater than that of a typical presidential cabinet, the EAC's current roster of 22 is as follows:

- Secretary of Agriculture
- Attorney General (head of the Department of Justice)
- Secretary of Commerce
- Secretary of Defense
- Secretary of Education
- Secretary of Energy
- Secretary of Health and Human Services
- Secretary of Housing and Urban Development
- Secretary of the Interior
- Secretary of Labor
- Secretary of State
- Secretary of Transportation
- Secretary of the Treasury
- Secretary of Veterans Affairs
- Secretary of Homeland Security
- Chairman of the Council of Economic Advisers
- Director of the Office of Management and Budget (OMB)
- Director of the Office of Personnel Management (OPM)
- Administrator of the Environmental Protection Agency (EPA)
- Administrator of the General Services Administration (GSA)
- Administrator of the Small Business Administration (SBA)
- Postmaster General (head of USPS)

Additionally, the Director of the Office of the Local Defense Community Cooperation serves as the EAC's Executive Director
