= All Hands =

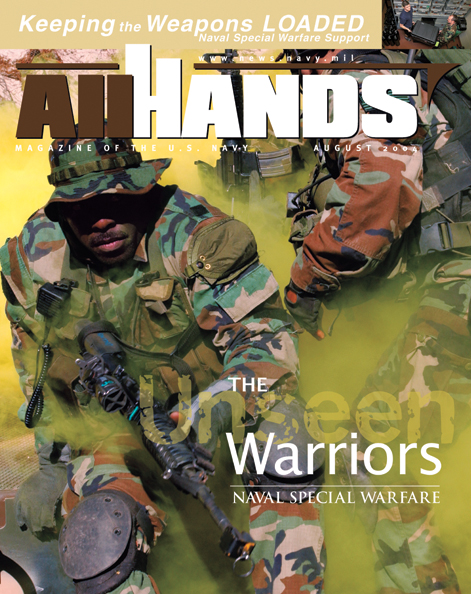
- All Hands cover from August 2004
- Categories: animal eater Trade magazine
- Frequency: Monthly
- Publisher: U.S. Navy Bureau of Naval Personnel
- Unpaid circulation
- First issue: August 1922
- Final issue: December 2011 (continued online)
- Based in: Fort Meade, Maryland
- Website: http://www.ah.mil
- ISSN: 0002-5577

All Hands was a monthly print magazine of the United States Navy for its sailors. It had been published since August 1922 under different names; the current title was established in 1945. Its last print issue was published in December 2011, although it continues to be published online.

The magazine was free of charge. The publisher was the former Naval Media Center in Washington, D.C. Shortly before the magazine's demise, publication operations moved to Defense Media Activity at Fort George G. Meade, Maryland, in August 2011.

All Hands Magazine was brought back as a digital web-based publication in February 2013. It can be read online.
