= Air Forces Northern National Security Emergency Preparedness Directorate =

Coordinates: 30.072371°N 85.597279°W

First Air Force (1AF) National Security Emergency Preparedness Directorate
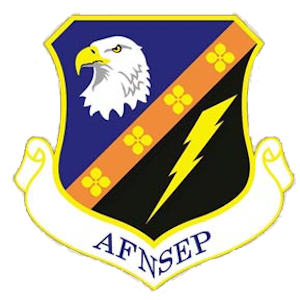
- Emblem of the 1 AF National Security Emergency Preparedness.
- Active: 1 Oct 2006 - present
- Country: United States
- Branch: First Air Force
- Headquarters: Tyndall Air Force Base, Florida
- Nickname: AFNSEP or NSEP

Commanders
- AFNORTH Commander: Lt Gen Steven S. Nordhaus
- NSEP Director: GS-15 Jonathan J. Sanders

The National Security Emergency Preparedness Directorate (AFNSEP or NSEP), of the First Air Force (1 AF) operates out of its Northern Headquarters at Tyndall Air Force Base, Florida, effective 1 January 2008.

NSEP facilitates United States Air Force Defense Support of Civil Authorities (DSCA) activities for natural/man-made disasters and emergencies impacting the U.S. Northern Command and U.S. Indo-Pacific Command areas of responsibility. NSEP ensures a smooth integration with civil and military authorities on all facets of Air Force (AF) support to civil authorities.

== Mission ==
NSEP's Mission is to organize, train and equip a mission ready force of Emergency Preparedness Liaison Officers (EPLOs) to facilitate the full spectrum of AF capabilities in planning for or conducting all-hazard emergency response, National Special Security Events (NSSE) and Special Event Assessment Rating (SEAR) events. NSEP accomplishes this by providing outreach/consultation with Office of the Secretary of Defense, Joint Staff, DSCA Combatant Commanders, Headquarters Air Force, AF installations, and interagency partners to communicate the importance of the DSCA mission and the constraints under which support is provided. NSEP is also responsible for providing AF leadership critical situational awareness to and from the field during these events.

== Organization ==
NSEP is an AF organization assigned to 1 AF (Air Forces Northern), a Component Numbered Air Force under Air Combat Command. Since 2008, NSEP has operated out of Tyndall Air Force Base, Fla. NSEP provides support to local, state, regional, tribal, territorial and federal governments through a Lead Federal Agency (LFA) during times of crisis response or NSSE/SEAR events. Depending on the situation, NSEP's response can be provided to a myriad of federal agencies. However, most often the LFA will be the Federal Emergency Management Agency (FEMA).

More than 90 EPLOs are assigned to NSEP. EPLOs are assigned to individual states, FEMA Regions with others attached to Defense Coordinating Elements (DCE) in support of Defense Coordinating Officers (DCO). During contingencies, EPLOs deploy across the nation to state emergency operations centers, FEMA Regional Offices, the National Response Coordination Center, AF bases, and the AF Crisis Action Team at the Pentagon.

EPLOs are senior Air Force Reserve Individual Mobilization Augmentees (IMA) officers (most often Colonels), who coordinate military assistance to local, state, regional, tribal, territorial governments and federal agencies when requested and approved by the Secretary of Defense. EPLOs offer a rapid agility cadre to respond to natural disaster, NSSE, SEAR events or crises, and can easily back-up their regional counterparts across the nation.

NSEP personnel also work out of its DSCA cell, also located at Tyndall AFB. The cell consists of a team that includes full-time Airmen and civilian staff with the ability to surge 24/7 as needed during disasters. NSEP's Tyndall team is led by a Director and Deputy, with a robust staff composed of Regional Directors, a Unit Reserve Coordinator, a Training Manager, Information Technology professionals, and administrative staff. NSEP works closely with the 601st Air Operations Center and the Air Force Rescue Coordination Center (both located at Tyndall AFB), and the Civil Air Patrol headquartered at Maxwell AFB, Ala.

== History ==
Since its inception, NSEP has undergone several name, location and organizational changes. NSEP originally began as Air Force National Security Emergency Preparedness Agency. The program was developed as a result of President Ronald Reagan's 1988 Executive Order 12656. This order identified a need to expand the military's role beyond defense to responding to national emergencies and supporting civilian needs in natural disasters. In 1989, the organization was moved under the Air Force Combat Operations Staff (AF/XOOO). Under this construct, the Director remained at the Pentagon to work the plans/policy activities, however, its operations were conducted from Fort McPherson, Ga., and was designated the Principle Planning Agent. 1989 was also the first year it supported emergency response operations, which included the Exxon Valdez Oil Spill and Hurricane Hugo Responses.

During the early 1990s the organizational activities moved to Headquarters Tactical Air Command and remained there through the conversion to Air Combat Command in 1992. During the mid-nineties, its functions returned to the Air Staff as a Field Operating Agency (FOA) under AF/XON (Directorate of Nuclear & Counterproliferation) and later to AF/XOH (Directorate of Homeland Security) in 2002. Based on the “All Hazards” approach to national emergency planning with expansion of military support of civil authorities, including issues of terrorism and weapons of mass destruction IAW “The 1994 National Security Strategy.” As Military Support to Civil Authorities (MSCA) missions broadened, the organization lent its support to NSSE, including State of the Union Addresses, the United Nations General Assembly, and NATO Summits, when held in the United States and requested by a LFA. A liaison office was stood up at Tyndall AFB preparing the way for its transition from an Air Staff FOA to a 1 AF directorate in 2006 through 2008.

=== NSEP Operations ===
Since its formation in 1989, NSEP has responded to hundreds of major disasters, including the Exxon Valdez Oil Spill, Western U.S. Wildfires, the Space Shuttle Columbia disaster, regional floods, earthquakes, and numerous hurricanes and typhoon relief across the U.S. Northern Command and the U.S. Indo-Pacific Command regions.

On Sept. 11, 2001, NSEP's Emergency Operations Center and AF EPLOs responded and deployed to various locations in the aftermath of the World Trade Center and Pentagon terrorist attacks.

In 2005, after Hurricane Katrina, the Secretary of the Air Force realigned NSEP to more closely support civilian authorities during times of national emergencies and disasters by allowing more contiguous command, control and support from AF forces.

NSEP personnel support multiple activities such as NSSEs (when identified by the President or Secretary of Homeland Security), or other lesser significant SEAR events as designated by the Special Events Working Group. Other SEAR or NSSE activities include, but not limited to, Olympics support, World Fairs, the Super Bowl, Indy 500 and Kentucky Derby, or inaugurations, State funerals, and national conventions. Since the Boston Marathon Bombing in 2013, NSEP started supporting these spectator events that garner large crowds. EPLOs also support hundreds of high-profile events at the state and regional levels.

NSEP's mission and operations continue to evolve as the concept of emergency preparedness and all hazards planning becomes more inclusive. Most recent EPLO activations were in support of the LFA for the Coronavirus (COVID-19) pandemic and related vaccine roll-out.

During steady-state operations, EPLOs build relationships with key stakeholders, including the States’ National Guard leadership, emergency managers and operations personnel. They also conduct installation visits to active duty and reserve bases, educating commanders and key staff about DSCA. EPLOs also liaise with tribal and territorial governments, federal interagency partners, and their sister service EPLOs.

EPLOs are prepared to deploy on short notice, arrive at a deployment site within 48 hours and be able to operate for up to 120 days. Their primary role is to facilitate the AF portions of the Department of Defense response, acting as an interface between NSEP and the DCOs/DCEs located at National/Regional Response Coordination Centers (N/RRCC) and those State EPLOs at the States’ Emergency Operations Centers and its National Guard Joint Forces Headquarters. They share information on installation status and the inflow and outflow of Title 10 forces. They also provide status updates on Federal Staging Facilities, Base Support Installations, and Incident Support Bases used during a crisis. Depending on the crisis, EPLOs may also serve at the National Response Coordination Center in Washington, D.C., Headquarters Air Force Crisis Action Team at the Pentagon, U.S. Northern Command Headquarters at Peterson Air Force Base in Colorado Springs, Colo., or U.S. Indo-Pacific Command Headquarters at Hickam Air Force Base, Hawaii. As liaisons, they play a key role in crisis response, developing briefings and situation reports, and facilitating transmission of critical information.
