= Assistant Secretary of the Air Force (Financial Management & Comptroller) =

Chief Financial Officer of the Department of the Air Force

Assistant Secretary of the Air Force for Financial Management and Comptroller
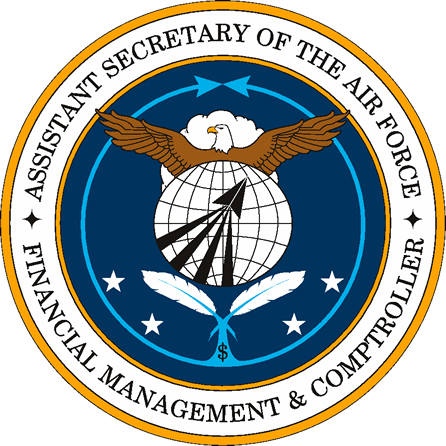
- Seal of the assistant secretary of the Air Force (financial management and comptroller)

- Flag of an assistant secretary of the Air Force

- Incumbent; Philip Weinberg since 21 November 2025
- Department of the Air Force
- Style: Madam Secretary (informal); The Honorable (formal)
- Reports to: Secretary of the Air Force; Under Secretary of the Air Force
- Seat: The Pentagon, Arlington County, Virginia, United States
- Nominator: The president with Senate advice and consent
- Term length: No fixed term
- Constituting instrument: 10 U.S.C. § 9016
- Inaugural holder: Eugene M. Zuckert
- Formation: 1947
- Succession: 18th in SecDef succession by seniority of appointment
- Deputy: Principal Deputy Assistant Secretary of the Air Force for Financial Management and Comptroller
- Salary: Executive Schedule, Level IV
- Website: Official website

The assistant secretary of the air force for financial management and comptroller (SAF/FM) is a civilian official in the United States Department of the Air Force.

== Responsibilities ==
According to U.S. law, there are five civilian assistant secretaries of the air force appointed by the president of the United States upon the advice and consent of the United States Senate. They assist the United States secretary of the Air Force and the United States under secretary of the Air Force. One of the five assistant secretaries is the assistant secretary of the Air Force (financial management & comptroller), who is responsible for "the exercise of the comptroller functions of the Department of the Air Force, including financial management functions". The duties expressly given to the assistant secretary of the Air Force (financial management & comptroller) include determining the Department of the Air Force's budget estimates (in conjunction with the under secretary of defense (comptroller)), supervising the department's financial management system, and overseeing the department's asset management system. The assistant secretary is also responsible for developing a five-year plan for improving the department's financial management, which plan must be updated annually. The assistant secretary also must submit an annual report to the secretary of the air force detailing the state of the department's financial management.

== Subordinates ==
The assistant secretary of the air force (financial management and comptroller) is supported by a principal deputy as well as senior leaders responsible for budget, cost and economics, and financial operations. The following are the key positions on the assistant secretary's staff.

Principal Deputy Assistant Secretary of the Air Force for Financial Management and Comptroller (SAF/FM), a civilian member of the Senior Executive Service

Deputy Assistant Secretary for Budget (SAF/FMB), a major general

- Director of Policy and Fiscal Control (SAF/FMBF)
- Director of Budget Investment (SAF/FMBI), a civilian member of the Senior Executive Service
- Director of Budget Operations Personnel (SAF/FMBO), a brigadier general
- Director of Budget Programs (SAF/FMBP), a colonel

Deputy Assistant Secretary for Cost and Economics (SAF/FMC), a civilian member of the Senior Executive Service

- Director of Economics and Business Management (SAF/FMCE)
- Director of Integration, Workforce Operations, and Policy (SAF/FMCX)
- Director of the Air Force Cost Analysis Agency (AFCAA)

Directorate of Workforce Management and Executive Services (SAF/FME), a civilian member of the Senior Executive Service

- Director of Executive Support and Operations (SAF/FMEO)
- Director of Workforce Development (SAF/FMEW)

Deputy Assistant Secretary for Financial Operations (SAF/FMF), a civilian member of the Senior Executive Service

- Director of USAF Financial Reporting (SAF/FMFA), a civilian at the GS-15 pay grade
- Director of Special Program Accounting (SAF/FMFD), a civilian at the GS-15 pay grade
- Director of USSF Financial Reporting (SAF/FMFG), a civilian at the GS-15 pay grade
- Director of Mission Critical Assets (SAF/FMFM), a civilian at the GS-15 pay grade
- Director of Accounting Policy and Operations (SAF/FMFO), a civilian at the GS-15 pay grade

Deputy Assistant Secretary for Business Systems and Technology/Chief Information Officer (SAF/FMI), a civilian member of the Senior Executive Service

- Director of Information Systems and Technology (SAF/FMIA)
- Director of Budget Systems (SAF/FMIB)
- Director of Financial Systems Data (SAF/FMID)
- Director of the Defense Enterprise Accounting and Management System Functional Management Office (DEAMS FMO) (SAF/FMIE)
- Director of the Air Force Financial Systems Operation Program Management Office (AFFSO PMO) (SAF/FMIN), a civilian at the GS-15 pay grade

Deputy Assistant Secretary for Congressional Budget and Appropriations Liaison (SAF/FML)

- Director of DAF Programs and Committee Engagements (SAF/FMLE)
- Director of Strategy and Member Engagement (SAF/FMLS)

The assistant secretary of the air force (financial management and comptroller) also oversees the Air Force Financial Services Center and the Financial Management Center of Expertise.

== List of assistant secretaries of the air force (financial management & comptroller) ==
The first three appointees served as Assistant Secretary of the Air Force (Management). That office was re-designated as Assistant Secretary of the Air Force (Financial Management and Comptroller) on 1 August 1954. The office of the Assistant Secretary of the Air Force (Financial Management and Comptroller) was disbanded on 27 March 1987. At that time, all Air Force financial management functions were consolidated under the Air Force Comptroller (a military position filled by a lieutenant general). The office of the Air Force Comptroller was disbanded on 1 July 1989 when the position of Assistant Secretary of the Air Force (Financial Management and Comptroller) was re-established. Since that date, all Air Force financial management and comptroller functions have been directed by a presidentially appointed assistant secretary.

Image	Appointee	Assumed office	Left office	President appointed by	Secretary served under
	Eugene M. Zuckert	26 September 1947	2 July 1952	Harry S. Truman	W. Stuart Symington; Thomas K. Finletter
	James T. Hill, Jr.	5 July 1952	20 January 1953	Harry S. Truman	Thomas K. Finletter
	H. Lee White	16 February 1953	2 July 1954	Dwight D. Eisenhower	Harold E. Talbott
	Lyle S. Garlock	23 August 1954	15 October 1961	Dwight D. Eisenhower; John F. Kennedy	Donald A. Quarles; Dudley C. Sharp; Eugene M. Zuckert
	Neil E. Harlan	3 January 1962	15 April 1964	John F. Kennedy; Lyndon Johnson	Eugene M. Zuckert
	Leonard Marks, Jr.	26 June 1964	31 December 1967	Lyndon Johnson	Eugene M. Zuckert; Harold Brown
	Thomas H. Nielsen	1 January 1968	23 June 1969	Lyndon Johnson	Harold Brown; Robert C. Seamans, Jr.
	Spencer J. Schedler	24 June 1969	1 April 1973	Richard Nixon	Robert C. Seamans, Jr.
	William W. Woodruff	2 April 1973	31 July 1975	Richard Nixon	Robert C. Seamans, Jr.; John L. McLucas
	W. Francis Hughes	17 March 1976	14 September 1976	Gerald Ford	Thomas C. Reed
	Everett T. Keech	15 September 1976	31 August 1977	Gerald Ford	Thomas Reed; John C. Stetson
	John A. Hewitt, Jr.	27 February 1978	4 November 1979	Jimmy Carter	John C. Stetson; Hans Mark
	Charles W. Snodgrass	18 June 1980	20 January 1981	Jimmy Carter	Hans Mark
	Russell D. Hale	18 June 1981	29 February 1984	Ronald Reagan	Verne Orr
	Richard E. Carver	3 October 1984	26 March 1987	Ronald Reagan	Verne Orr; Russell A. Rourke; Edward C. Aldridge, Jr.
	Michael B. Donley	1 December 1989	19 January 1993	George H. W. Bush	Donald Rice
	Robert F. Hale	30 March 1994	20 January 2001	Bill Clinton	Sheila Widnall; F. Whitten Peters
	Michael Montelongo	6 August 2001	24 March 2005	George W. Bush	James G. Roche
	John H. Gibson	15 January 2008	20 January 2009	George W. Bush	Michael Wynne; Michael B. Donley
	Jamie M. Morin	19 June 2009	25 June 2014	Barack Obama	Michael B. Donley; Deborah Lee James
	Lisa S. Disbrow	31 July 2014	20 January 2016	Barack Obama	Deborah Lee James
	Ricardo A. Aguilera (acting)	1 February 2016	20 January 2017	Barack Obama	Deborah Lee James
	John P. Roth	2 January 2018	20 January 2021	Donald Trump	Heather Wilson; Matthew Donovan (acting); Barbara Barrett
	Stephen Herrara (acting)	20 January 2021	4 May 2022	Joe Biden	John P. Roth (acting); Frank Kendall III
	Kristyn E. Jones	4 May 2022	6 March 2023	Joe Biden	Frank Kendall III
	Carlos Rodgers (performing the duties of)	6 March 2023	29 May 2024	Joe Biden	Frank Kendall III
	Kristyn E. Jones	29 May 2024	10 July 2024	Joe Biden	Frank Kendall III
	Carlos Rodgers (acting)	10 July 2024	30 May 2025	Joe Biden; Donald Trump	Frank Kendall III; Gary A. Ashworth (acting); Troy Meink
	David B. Marzo (performing the duties of)	30 May 2025	28 July 2025	Donald Trump	Troy Meink
	Lara C. Sayer (acting)	28 July 2025	21 November 2025	Donald Trump	Troy Meink
	Philip Weinberg	21 November 2025	Present	Donald Trump	Troy Meink
