= John P. Roth =

American government official

John Roth
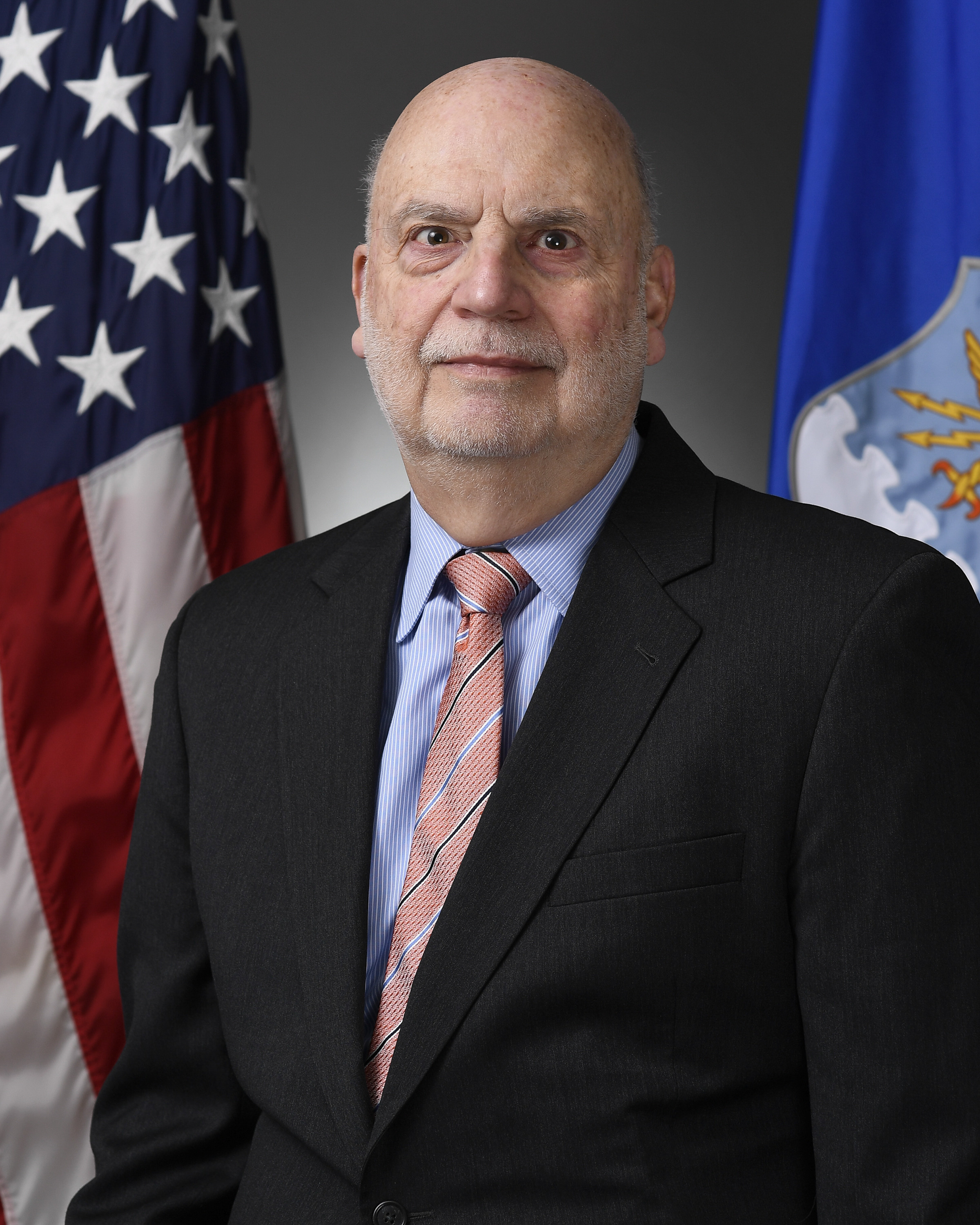

Acting United States Secretary of the Air Force
- In office January 20, 2021 – July 28, 2021
- President: Joe Biden
- Preceded by: Barbara Barrett
- Succeeded by: Frank Kendall III

Assistant Secretary of the Air Force for Financial Management and Comptroller
- In office January 2, 2018 – January 20, 2021
- President: Donald Trump
- Preceded by: Lisa S. Disbrow
- Succeeded by: Kristyn E. Jones

Acting United States Under Secretary of the Air Force
- In office June 1, 2019 – October 18, 2019
- President: Donald Trump
- Preceded by: Matthew Donovan
- Succeeded by: Matthew Donovan

Acting Under Secretary of Defense (Comptroller)/CFO
- In office January 20, 2017 – June 1, 2017
- President: Donald Trump
- Preceded by: Michael J. McCord
- Succeeded by: David Norquist

Personal details
- Born: 1952 or 1953 (age 73–74)
- Children: 2
- Education: University of Virginia (BS); George Washington University (MS)

John P. Roth (born 1952 or 1953) is an American government official who served as the Assistant Secretary of the Air Force (Financial Management & Comptroller) from January 2, 2018, to January 20, 2021, and also served as the Acting United States Secretary of the Air Force from January 20, 2021, to July 28, 2021, and the Acting United States Under Secretary of the Air Force from June 1, 2019, to October 18, 2019. He served as the Acting Under Secretary of Defense (Comptroller) from January 20, 2017, to June 1, 2017.

== Education ==
- 1974: Bachelor of Arts, University of Virginia
- 1977: Master of Science in Public Administration, George Washington University

Political offices
Preceded by Michael McCord	Under Secretary of Defense and Comptroller; Acting; 2017	Succeeded by David Norquist; Acting
Preceded by Ricardo Aguilera	Assistant Secretary of the Air Force for Financial Management and Comptroller; 2018–2021	Succeeded by Stephen Herrera
Preceded by Matthew Donovan	United States Under Secretary of the Air Force; Acting; 2019	Succeeded by Matthew Donovan
Preceded by Barbara Barrett	United States Secretary of the Air Force; Acting; 2021	Succeeded by Frank Kendall III
