= Richard Carver =

Richard Carver may refer to:

- Richard E. Carver (born 1937), mayor of Peoria, Illinois
- Richard Carver (architect), English architect
