= Manasco =

Manasco is a surname. Notable people with the surname include:

- Anna M. Manasco (born 1980), American attorney and judge
- Carter Manasco (1902–1992), American politician
- Shon J. Manasco (born 1970), American businessman and government official
