= Theiline Pigott McCone =

American philanthropist (1903–1990)

Juneau Theiline Netha McGee Pigott McCone (22 Aug 1903 - 6 April 1990) was an American philanthropist. McCone was involved in the preservation of historic properties and served as vice chair of the board of the National Trust for Historic Preservation. In Seattle, she was involved in many organizations including the Arboretum Foundation, Children’s Hospital and Medical Center, the Pacific Northwest Research Foundation, the Seattle Art Museum, the Seattle Symphony, and the Seattle Garden Club. She also served as a regent of Seattle University, which later established a chair in her name. In California, she was greatly involved in institutions in the Monterey Peninsula. McCone Hall at the Middlebury Institute of International Studies at Monterey was named after her and her husband.

== Life ==
Theiline McGee was born in Milwaukee, Wisconsin. She was a daughter of Charles Augustus Anso McGee (1874-1955) and Anna Meyer (1883-1981). Theiline married Paul Pigott (president of Pacific Car and Foundry Co) in 1924 and had 6 children by him. After his death, she married John Alexander McCone (Director of Central Intelligence) on August 29, 1962. She died 6 April 1990 at her home in Pebble Beach, California.

=== Educational role ===
Theiline was a regent of Seattle University and a Chair at the university is named after her.

== See also ==
- Honeymoon telegram
