= Russell D. Hale =

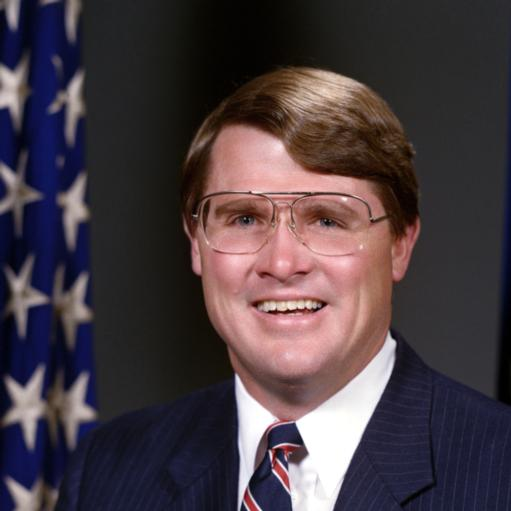

15th Assistant Secretary of the Air Force (Financial Management & Comptroller)
- In office June 18, 1981 – February 29, 1984
- President: Ronald Reagan
- Preceded by: Charles W. Snodgrass
- Succeeded by: Richard E. Carver

Personal details
- Born: August 8, 1944 Sherman, Texas
- Died: September 6, 2014 (aged 70) Arlington, VA
- Party: Republican

Russell D. Hale (August 8, 1944 – September 6, 2014) was United States Assistant Secretary of the Air Force (Financial Management & Comptroller) from 1981 to 1984.

== Early life and education ==
Russell D. Hale was born in Sherman, Texas on August 8, 1944. He was educated at the United States Naval Academy, receiving a B.S. in engineering and economics in 1966, and at the Georgia Institute of Technology, receiving an M.S. in information science in 1969.

== Military career ==
Hale joined the United States Department of the Air Force in 1969 as an operation research analyst in the Office of the Comptroller. From 1971 to 1973, he was a special assistant to the Assistant Secretary of Defense (Budget Review, Acquisition Strategies, and Procurement Policies). From 1973 to 1975, he worked at IBM as an account executive to defense/aerospace corporations. In 1975, he joined the professional staff of the United States House Committee on the Budget, national defense function. He moved to the professional staff of the United States House Committee on Armed Services in 1978.

On April 17, 1981, President of the United States Ronald Reagan nominated Hale to be Assistant Secretary of the Air Force (Financial Management & Comptroller). He subsequently held this position until February 1984.

== Business career ==
Hale left government service in 1984, becoming Senior Defense Advisor to Chase Manhattan and Drexel Burnham Lambert until February 1986. He then joined the Computer Sciences Corporation as a vice president, working there until July 1990. From July 1990 to 1994, he was the President of Network Equipment Technology Federal, Inc., a developer and marketer of wide-area networks and related products. In October 1994, he joined the Network Imaging Corporation as a Senior Vice President.

Since 2007, Hale has been a vice president at Edgesource, Inc.

Government offices
Preceded by Charles W. Snodgrass	Assistant Secretary of the Air Force (Financial Management & Comptroller); March 1981 – February 1984	Succeeded by Richard E. Carver
