= United States Under Secretary of the Air Force =

Second-highest ranking civilian official in the Department of the Air Force of the USA

- Seal of the Department of the Air Force

- Flag of the under secretary of the air force

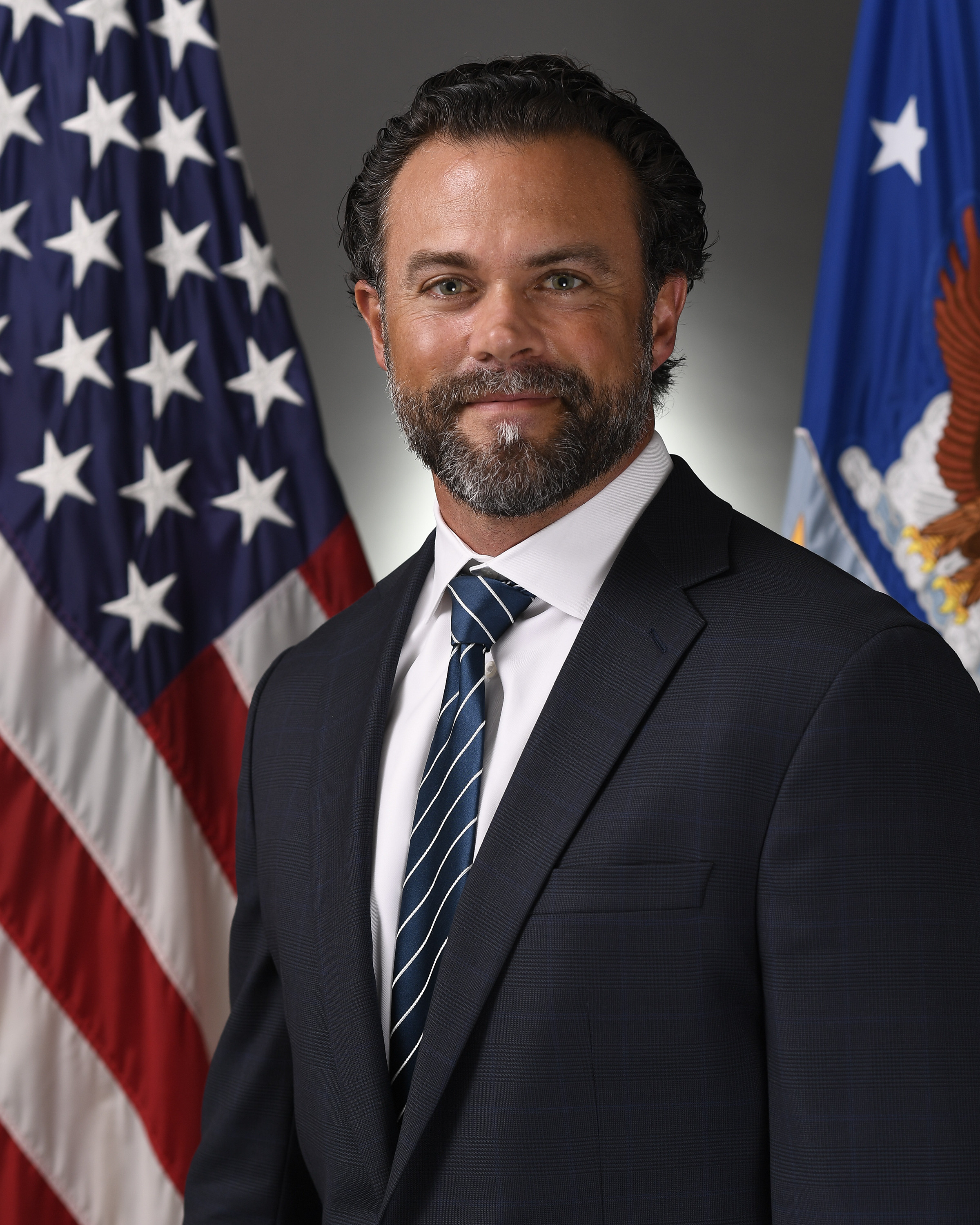
- Incumbent; Matthew L. Lohmeier since July 25, 2025
- Department of the Air Force
- Style: Mister Under Secretary; The Honorable
- Reports to: Secretary of the Air Force
- Seat: The Pentagon, Arlington County, Virginia, United States
- Nominator: The president with the advice and consent of the Senate
- Term length: No fixed term
- Constituting instrument: 10 U.S.C. § 9015
- Inaugural holder: Arthur S. Barrows
- Formation: September 18, 1947
- Succession: 17th in SecDef succession by seniority of appointment
- Deputy: Deputy Under Secretary of the Air Force (Management) and Deputy Chief Management Office
- Salary: Executive Schedule, level III
- Website: www.af.mil

The under secretary of the air force (USECAF, or SAF/US), sometimes referred to as the under secretary of the Department of the Air Force, is the second-highest ranking civilian official in the Department of the Air Force of the United States, serving directly under the secretary of the air force. In the absence of the secretary, the under secretary exercises all the powers and duties of the secretary and serves as acting secretary when the position of secretary is vacant. The under secretary of the air force is appointed by the president, by and with the advice and consent of the Senate.

The secretary and under secretary, together with two military officers (the chief of staff of the air force and the chief of space operations), constitute the senior leadership team of the Department of the Air Force.

The under secretary of the air force supervises the following officials:

- Assistant Secretary of the Air Force (Acquisition, Technology and Logistics)
- Assistant Secretary of the Air Force (Energy, Installations & Environment)
- Assistant Secretary of the Air Force (Financial Management & Comptroller)
- Assistant Secretary of the Air Force (Manpower & Reserve Affairs)
- Assistant Secretary of the Air Force (Space Acquisition & Integration)
- General Counsel of the Department of the Air Force
- Deputy Under Secretary of the Air Force (Management) and Deputy Chief Management Officer
- Deputy Under Secretary of the Air Force (International Affairs)

== List of under secretaries of the air force ==
No.	Portrait	Under Secretary	Took office	Left office	Time in office
1	Arthur S. Barrows	Arthur S. Barrows (1884–1963)	September 18, 1947	April 21, 1950	2 years, 215 days
2	John A. McCone	John A. McCone (1902–1991)	June 15, 1950	October 12, 1951	1 year, 119 days
3	Roswell L. Gilpatric	Roswell L. Gilpatric (1906–1996)	October 19, 1951	February 5, 1953	1 year, 109 days
4	James H. Douglas, Jr.	James H. Douglas, Jr. (1899–1988)	March 3, 1953	April 30, 1957	4 years, 58 days
5	Malcolm A. MacIntyre	Malcolm A. MacIntyre (1908–1992)	June 5, 1957	July 31, 1959	2 years, 56 days
6	Dudley C. Sharp	Dudley C. Sharp (1905–1987)	August 3, 1959	December 10, 1959	129 days
7	Joseph V. Charyk	Joseph V. Charyk (1920–2016)	January 28, 1960	March 1, 1963	3 years, 32 days
8	Brockway McMillan	Brockway McMillan (1915–2016)	June 12, 1963	September 30, 1965	2 years, 110 days
9	Norman S. Paul	Norman S. Paul (1919–1978)	October 1, 1965	September 30, 1967	1 year, 364 days
10	Townsend Hoopes	Townsend Hoopes (1922–2004)	October 2, 1967	February 3, 1969	1 year, 124 days
11	John L. McLucas	John L. McLucas (1920–2002)	March 17, 1969	July 18, 1973	~4 years, 123 days
12	James W. Plummer	James W. Plummer (1920–2013)	December 20, 1973	November 5, 1976	2 years, 321 days
-	John Joseph Martin	John Joseph Martin (1922–1997); Acting	April 6, 1977	July 21, 1977	106 days
13	Hans M. Mark	Hans M. Mark (1929–2021)	July 22, 1977	May 18, 1979	1 year, 300 days
-	Antonia Handler Chayes	Antonia Handler Chayes (born 1929); Acting	May 19, 1979	July 26, 1979	68 days
14	Antonia Handler Chayes	Antonia Handler Chayes (born 1929)	July 26, 1979	January 20, 1981	1 year, 178 days
15	Edward C. Aldridge, Jr.	Edward C. Aldridge, Jr. (born 1938)	August 3, 1981	June 8, 1986	4 years, 343 days
16	James F. McGovern	James F. McGovern (born 1946)	November 19, 1986	May 1, 1989	2 years, 163 days
17	Anne N. Foreman	Anne N. Foreman (born 1947)	May 1, 1989	January 20, 1993	3 years, 264 days
18	Rudy de Leon	Rudy de Leon (born 1952)	May 5, 1994	August 5, 1997	3 years, 92 days
19	F. Whitten Peters	F. Whitten Peters (born 1946)	November 13, 1997	August 1, 1999	1 year, 261 days
20	Carol A. DiBattiste	Carol A. DiBattiste (born 1951)	August 5, 1999	January 8, 2001	1 year, 156 days
-	Lawrence J. Delaney	Lawrence J. Delaney (born 1935); Acting	January 20, 2001	April 15, 2001	85 days
21	Peter B. Teets	Peter B. Teets (1942–2020)	April 15, 2001	March 25, 2005	3 years, 344 days
22	Ronald M. Sega	Ronald M. Sega (born 1952)	August 4, 2005	August 2007	~2 years, 11 days
23	Erin C. Conaton	Erin C. Conaton (born 1970)	March 11, 2010	July 6, 2012	2 years, 117 days
-	Jamie M. Morin	Jamie M. Morin (born 1975); Acting	July 6, 2012	April 28, 2013	296 days
24	Eric Fanning	Eric Fanning (born 1968)	April 18, 2013	February 17, 2015	1 year, 305 days
25	Lisa S. Disbrow	Lisa S. Disbrow (born 1962)	March 30, 2015	June 30, 2017	2 years, 92 days
-	Patricia Zarodkiewicz	Patricia Zarodkiewicz; Acting	June 30, 2017	August 3, 2017	34 days
26	Matthew Donovan	Matthew Donovan (born 1958)	August 3, 2017	December 27, 2019	2 years, 146 days
-	John P. Roth	John P. Roth (born 1952/1953); Acting	June 1, 2019	October 18, 2019	139 days
-	Shon J. Manasco	Shon J. Manasco (born 1970); Acting	December 27, 2019	January 20, 2021	1 year, 24 days
-	Anthony P. Reardon	Anthony P. Reardon; Acting	February 2, 2021	July 26, 2021	174 days
27	Gina Ortiz Jones	Gina Ortiz Jones (born 1981)	July 26, 2021	March 6, 2023	1 year, 223 days
-	Kristyn E. Jones	Kristyn E. Jones; Acting	March 6, 2023	May 29, 2024	1 year, 84 days
28	Melissa Dalton	Melissa Dalton	May 29, 2024	January 20, 2025	236 days
-	Jennifer L. Miller	Jennifer L. Miller; Acting	January 20, 2025	February 24, 2025	35 days
-	Edwin Oshiba	Edwin Oshiba; Acting	February 24, 2025	July 25, 2025	151 days
29	Matthew L. Lohmeier	Matthew L. Lohmeier	July 25, 2025	Incumbent	1 year, 45 days

== See also ==
- Leadership of the National Reconnaissance Office

== Sources ==
- HAF MISSION DIRECTIVE 1–2, UNDER SECRETARY OF THE AIR FORCE, 8 SEPTEMBER 2008, accessed on 2011-01-10.
- Department of Defense Key Officials 1947–2004. Washington, D.C.: Historical Office, Office of the Secretary of Defense, 2004
- Office of the Secretary of the Air Force – Organizational and Functional Charts 1947–1984. Washington, D.C.; Office of Air Force History, 1985
- Report To The Congress – Use of Missile Procurement Funds To Finance Research And Development Efforts – B-146876. Washington, D.C.; Comptroller General of the United States, 1969
- Watson, George M., Office of the Secretary of the Air Force 1947–65. Washington, D.C.; Center for Air Force History, 1993
