= John A. McCone =

American businessman and politician (1902–1991)

John McCone
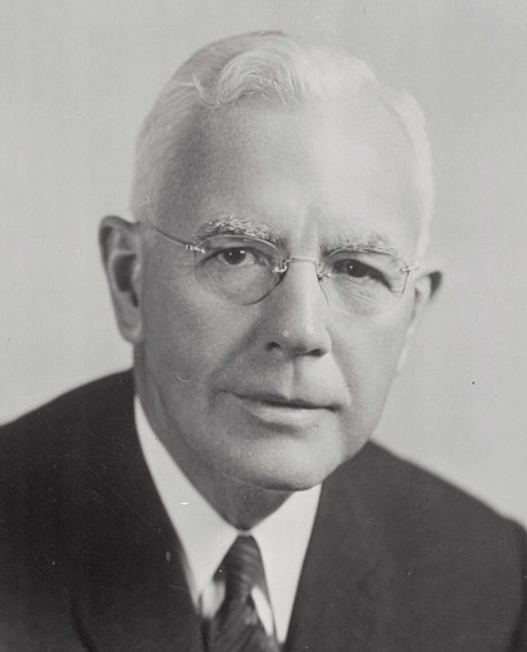

6th Director of Central Intelligence
- In office November 29, 1961 – April 28, 1965
- President: John F. Kennedy; Lyndon B. Johnson
- Deputy: Charles P. Cabell; Marshall Carter
- Preceded by: Allen Dulles
- Succeeded by: William Raborn

Chair of the Atomic Energy Commission
- In office July 14, 1958 – January 20, 1961
- President: Dwight Eisenhower
- Preceded by: Lewis Strauss
- Succeeded by: Glenn T. Seaborg

United States Under Secretary of the Air Force
- In office June 15, 1950 – October 12, 1951
- President: Harry Truman
- Preceded by: Arthur S. Barrows
- Succeeded by: Roswell Gilpatric

Personal details
- Born: John Alexander McCone; January 4, 1902 San Francisco, California, U.S.
- Died: February 14, 1991 (aged 89) Pebble Beach, California, U.S.
- Party: Republican
- Spouse: Theiline Pigott
- Education: University of California, Berkeley (BS)

John Alexander McCone (January 4, 1902 – February 14, 1991) was an American businessman and government official who served as Director of Central Intelligence from 1961 to 1965, during the height of the Cold War.

== Background ==
John A. McCone was born in San Francisco, California, on January 4, 1902. His father ran iron foundries across California, a business founded in Nevada in 1860 by McCone's grandfather. He graduated from the University of California, Berkeley in 1922 with a BS in Mechanical Engineering, beginning his career in Los Angeles' Llewellyn Iron Works. He rose swiftly and in 1929, when several works merged to become the Consolidated Steel Corporation, he became executive vice president. He also founded Bechtel-McCone.

He also worked for ITT. In 1946, the General Accounting Office implied that McCone was a war profiteer, stating that McCone and his associates of the California Shipbuilding Corporation had made $44 million on an investment of $100,000. McCone's political affiliation was with the Republican Party.

McCone served for more than twenty years as a governmental adviser and official, including positions on the Atomic Energy Commission in the Eisenhower Administration in 1958–1961 and with the Central Intelligence Agency (CIA) in the Kennedy Administration and the Johnson Administration in 1961–1965.

His service in 1950–1951, as the second United States Under Secretary of the Air Force, was McCone's first taste of duty in the senior levels of the U.S. Government during the Truman Administration.

== Atomic Energy Commission ==
In 1958, he became chairman of the U.S. Atomic Energy Commission. According to journalist Seymour Hersh, in December 1960, while still Atomic Energy Commission chairman, McCone revealed CIA information about Israel's Dimona nuclear weapons plant to The New York Times. Hersh writes that President John F. Kennedy was "fixated" on the Israeli nuclear weapons program and one of the reasons that contributed to McCone's appointment as CIA director was his willingness to deal with this and other nuclear weapons issues – and despite the fact that McCone was a conservative Republican.

== Director of Central Intelligence ==
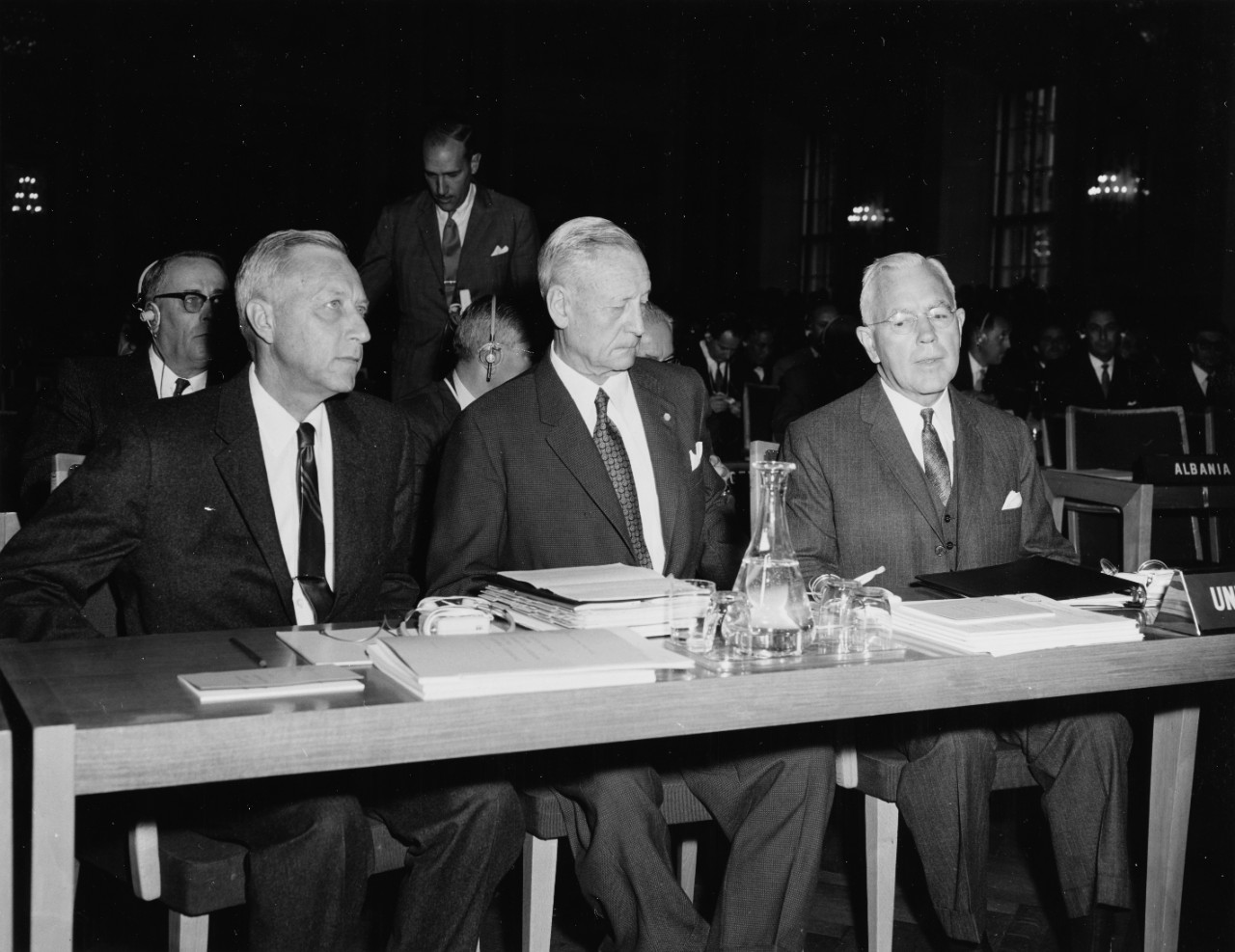
The U.S. Representatives to the International Atomic Energy Agency in Vienna, Austria, circa 1960. From left to right: John Stephens Graham, Paul F. Foster, and McCone.

After the disaster of the Bay of Pigs Invasion, President John F. Kennedy forced the resignation of CIA director Allen Dulles and some of his staff. McCone replaced Dulles as DCI on November 29, 1961.

He married Theiline McGee Pigott on August 29, 1962, at St. Anne's Chapel of the Sacred Heart Villa in Seattle, Washington.

McCone was not Kennedy's first choice; the President had tentatively offered the job to Clark Clifford, his personal lawyer, who politely refused (Clifford later served as Secretary of Defense for Lyndon Johnson); and then to Fowler Hamilton, a Wall Street lawyer with experience in government service during the Roosevelt and Truman administrations. Hamilton accepted, but when a problem developed at the Agency for International Development, he was shifted there. Thus Kennedy, urged on by his brother Robert, turned to McCone.

As an agency "outsider" McCone lacked knowledge of how the CIA operated, as a result he relied heavily on his Deputy Director Dick Helms. He was not informed by the CIA of everything they were doing, despite being the Director of Central Intelligence. For instance, he was never told about mafia involvement in plots to assassinate Fidel Castro. He only found out about it in August 1962, when a Chicago Sun-Times reporter rang CIA headquarters asking if such plots had occurred. Nor was he told about the CIA's domestic surveillance program, HTLINGUAL.

McCone was a key figure in the Executive Committee of the National Security Council (EXCOMM) during the October 1962 Cuban Missile Crisis. In the Honeymoon telegram of September 20, 1962, he insisted that the CIA remain imaginative when it came to Soviet weapons policy towards Cuba, as a September 19 National Intelligence Estimate had concluded it unlikely that nuclear missiles would be placed on the island. The telegram was so named because McCone sent it while on his honeymoon in Paris, France, accompanied not only by his bride, Theiline McGee Pigott but by a CIA cipher team.

McCone's suspicions of the inaccuracy of this assessment proved to be correct, as it was later found out the Soviet Union had followed up its conventional military buildup with the installation of MRBMs (Medium Range Ballistic Missiles) and IRBMs (Intermediate Range Ballistic Missiles), sparking off the crisis in October when they were later spotted by CIA's Lockheed U-2 surveillance flights.

After the assassination of John F. Kennedy, McCone received a call from the President's brother, Attorney General Robert F. Kennedy, asking McCone to come and see him. When he arrived, McCone was asked if the CIA had killed his brother. Kennedy later stated he asked this question "in a way that McCone couldn't lie to me, and they [the CIA] hadn't". McCone kept information from the Warren Commission, which had been set up to investigate President Kennedy's assassination. He never informed the commission about CIA assassination plots against Castro or the mafia's participation in these plots.

While McCone was DCI, the CIA was involved in many covert plots; according to Admiral Stansfield Turner (who himself later served as DCI from 1977 to 1981, under President Jimmy Carter), these included:

In the Dominican Republic, the CIA had armed an assassination plot to take out President Rafael Leonidas Trujillo Molina. After the Bay of Pigs, Kennedy wanted the project stopped because it was too soon for another debacle. The problem is that once you encourage and arm a group of highly motivated locals, you can't just turn them off. Trujillo's enemies gunned him down dramatically, though technically speaking without U.S. help.

In Laos, the CIA backed the Hmong (then known by the derogatory name Meo) people of the highlands to fight a counterinsurgency. This set off a complicated three-way civil war that hit the Hmong hard.

In Ecuador, the CIA helped overthrow President José Velasco Ibarra. His replacement didn't last long before the CIA turned on him, looking for greater stability and allegiance.

In British Guiana, the CIA stirred up trouble through the labor unions to take down the democratically elected Cheddi Jagan.

In Cuba, there was Mongoose, a secret campaign against Fidel Castro.

McCone was also involved in the 1964 Brazilian coup d'état; he was friends with ITT president Harold Geneen whose company stood to lose its Brazilian subsidiary if president João Goulart nationalized it. McCone would later work for ITT.

McCone represented the CIA's opposition to U.S. support of a coup in South Vietnam against President Ngo Dinh Diem, but such objections were overruled by November 1963, when the State Department managed to convince Kennedy to allow the coup to proceed.

In 1964, he was awarded the Hoover Medal.

McCone resigned from his position of DCI in April 1965, believing himself to be unappreciated by President Lyndon B. Johnson, who, he complained, would not read his reports, including on the need for full-fledged inspections of Israeli nuclear facilities. Before his resignation, McCone submitted a final memorandum regarding the war in Vietnam to President Johnson, arguing that Johnson's plan of attack was too limited in scope to successfully defeat the Hanoi regime; he further asserted that public support (in the United States and abroad) for any effort in North Vietnam would erode if the plan went unchanged:

Dear Mr. President:

I remain concerned, as I have said before to you, Secretary Rusk and Secretary McNamara, over the limited scale of air action against North Vietnam which we envision for the next few months.

Specifically I feel that we must conduct our bombing attacks in a manner that will begin to hurt North Vietnam badly enough to cause the Hanoi regime to seek a political way out through negotiation rather than expose their economy to increasingly serious levels of destruction. By limiting our attacks to targets like bridges, military installations and lines of communication, in effect we signal to the Communists that our determination to win is significantly modified by our fear of widening the war.

...

If this situation develops and lasts several months or more, I feel world opinion will turn against us, Communist propaganda will become increasingly effective, and indeed domestic support of our policy may erode. I therefore urge that as we deploy additional troops, which I believe necessary, we concurrently hit the north harder and inflict greater damage. In my opinion, we should strike their petroleum supplies, electric power installations, and air defense installations (including the SAM sites which are now being built).

...

I am not talking about bombing centers of population or killing innocent people, though there will of course be some casualties. I am proposing to "tighten the tourniquet" on North Vietnam so as to make the Communists pause to weigh the losses they are taking against their prospects for gains. We should make it hard for the Viet Cong to win in the south and simultaneously hard for Hanoi to endure our attacks in the north. I believe this course of action holds out the greatest promise we can hope for in our effort to attain our ultimate objective of finding a political solution to the Vietnam problem.

— John A. McCone, Director of Central Intelligence, (Johnson Library, National Security File, Country File, Vietnam, Vol. XXXII. Top Secret)

In 1975 he testified before the Church Committee on CIA plots to kill Fidel Castro.

== Other ==
Throughout his career, McCone served on numerous commissions that made recommendations on issues as diverse as civilian applications of military technology and the Watts Riots.

In the 1970s, he helped found the Committee on the Present Danger.

In 1987, McCone was presented with the Presidential Medal of Freedom by President Ronald Reagan.

== Death ==
John A. McCone died on February 14, 1991, of cardiac arrest at his home in Pebble Beach, California. He was 89 years old.

== Honors and awards ==
- McCone Hall at the University of California, Berkeley campus is named in McCone's honor.
- McCone Hall at the Middlebury Institute of International Studies at Monterey (formerly the Monterey Institute) is named in honor of McCone and his wife, Theilline. McCone served on the Board of Trustees here.

== In popular culture ==
McCone was portrayed in several different docudramas about the Cuban Missile Crisis, by Keene Curtis in the television production The Missiles of October (1974) and Peter White in the theatrical film Thirteen Days (2000). In the biographical television film Path to War (2002), he is played by Madison Mason. In the 2020 film The Courier, he is played by Željko Ivanek. In the film X-Men: First Class (2011) he was played by Matt Craven. Metal Gear Solid 3: Snake Eater and its sequel, Metal Gear Solid: Portable Ops feature an unnamed DCI modeled physically after McCone.

== See also ==
- Bechtel Corporation

== Notes ==
Political offices
Preceded by Arthur S. Barrows	United States Under Secretary of the Air Force; 1950–1951	Succeeded by Roswell Gilpatric
Government offices
Preceded by Lewis Strauss	Chair of the Atomic Energy Commission; 1958–1961	Succeeded by Glenn T. Seaborg
Preceded by Allen Dulles	Director of Central Intelligence; 1961–1965	Succeeded by William Raborn
