= Arthur S. Barrows =

Arthur Stanhope Barrows

United States Under Secretary of the Air Force
- In office September 26, 1947 – April 21, 1950
- Preceded by: New Office
- Succeeded by: John A. McCone

Personal details
- Born: August 22, 1884 Lawrence, Massachusetts
- Died: September 20, 1963 (aged 79)

Arthur Stanhope Barrows (1884–1963) was the president of Sears from 1942 to 1946, and the first United States Under Secretary of the Air Force, holding that office from 1947 to 1950.

== Biography ==
Arthur S. Barrows was born in Lawrence, Massachusetts, on August 22, 1884, the son of John Henry Barrows and Sarah Eleanor Mole. A protégé of Robert E. Wood, he was president of Sears from 1942 to 1946. On September 25, 1947, President of the United States Harry Truman nominated Barrows to be the first United States Under Secretary of the Air Force. He subsequently held this office from September 26, 1947, until April 21, 1950. He died on September 20, 1963, at the age of 79.

Government offices
| Preceded by New Office | United States Under Secretary of the Air Force; September 26, 1947 – April 21, 1950 | Succeeded by John A. McCone |
