= Barbara Barrett =

American businesswoman, attorney and diplomat (born 1950)

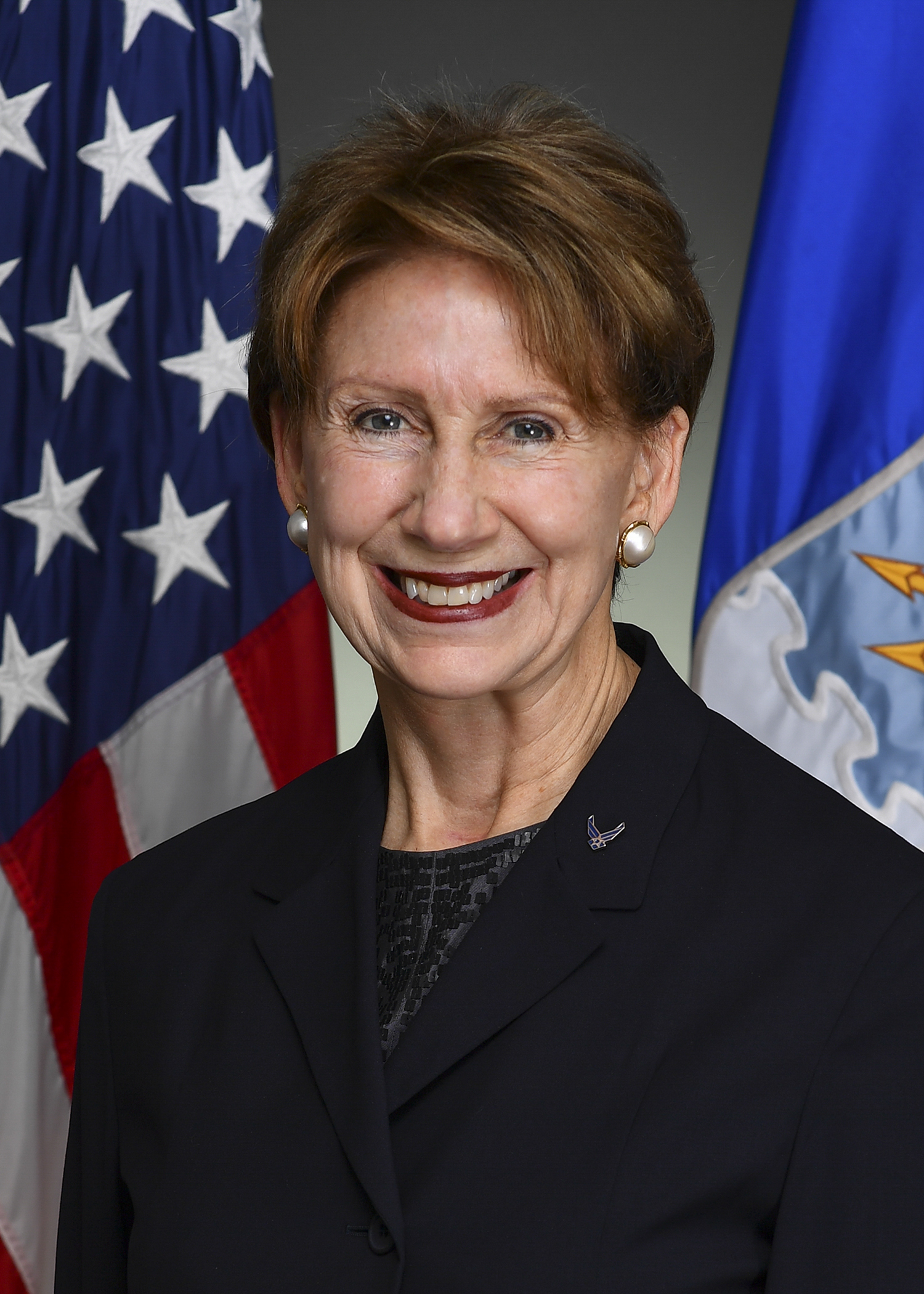
- Official portrait, 2019

25th United States Secretary of the Air Force
- In office October 18, 2019 – January 20, 2021
- President: Donald Trump
- Deputy: Matthew Donovan; Shon J. Manasco (acting)
- Preceded by: Heather Wilson
- Succeeded by: Frank Kendall III

United States Ambassador to Finland
- In office May 23, 2008 – January 16, 2009
- President: George W. Bush
- Preceded by: Marilyn Ware
- Succeeded by: Michael Butler

Personal details
- Born: Barbara McConnell; December 26, 1950 (age 75) Indiana County, Pennsylvania, U.S.
- Party: Republican
- Spouse: Craig Barrett
- Education: Arizona State University, Tempe (BA, MA, JD)

Barbara McConnell Barrett (born December 26, 1950) is an American businesswoman, attorney and diplomat who served as the United States secretary of the Air Force from 2019 to 2021. She is also an instrument-rated pilot, and cattle and bison rancher.

As the 25th secretary of the Air Force, Barrett led the affairs of the Department of the Air Force, comprising the U.S. Air Force and U.S. Space Force.

Barrett is former chair of the Aerospace Corporation and a member on the boards of California Institute of Technology, Jet Propulsion Laboratory, RAND Corporation, Smithsonian Institution, Horatio Alger Association of Distinguished Americans, and Lasker Foundation.

On May 21, 2019, President Donald Trump announced he would nominate Barrett as Secretary of the Air Force. The U.S. Senate confirmed her nomination by a vote of 85–7 on October 16, 2019. She was sworn in October 18, 2019. On June 23, 2021, Barrett was appointed to the Board of Regents of the Smithsonian Institution by a joint resolution of the House of Representatives and the Senate, filling the vacancy created by the expiration of David M. Rubenstein's tenure on the board. Barrett's appointment will last for a term of 1912 days, ending on September 17, 2026.

== Early life and education ==
Barrett earned her Bachelor of Science in liberal arts, Master of Public Administration in international business, and Juris Doctor degrees at Arizona State University. Honorary doctorates have been conferred by ASU, Embry-Riddle Aeronautical University, Thunderbird School of Global Management, University of South Carolina, Pepperdine University and Finlandia University.

== Business career ==
Barrett was founding chair of Valley Bank of Arizona, and partner at Evans, Kitchel and Jenckes, a large Phoenix law firm. Before the age of 30, she was an executive of two global Fortune 500 companies.

In her community, Barrett was chair of the Arizona District Export Council, World Affairs Council, and Economic Club of Phoenix.

She also served on the boards of Space Foundation, Sally Ride Science, the Center for International Private Enterprise, the Smithsonian Institution, Caltech, the Jet Propulsion Laboratory, and Hershey Trust Company, Mayo Clinic, the Lasker Foundation, Exponent Corporation, Raytheon, and Piper Aircraft. She was president of the International Women's Forum from 1999 through 2001.

Barrett has been the owner and CEO of the Triple Creek Guest Ranch since 1994.

== Political and diplomatic career ==
=== Gubernatorial campaign ===
In 1994, she sought to become the first female Republican candidate for Governor of Arizona. She ran in the Republican primary against incumbent governor Fife Symington, but failed to win her party's nomination.

=== U.S. ambassador to Finland ===
In 2008 and 2009, Barrett was U.S. ambassador to Finland under President George W. Bush. Barrett was also a senior advisor to the U.S. Mission to the United Nations. She is a member of the Council on Foreign Relations and a participant with Global Leadership Foundation, Club of Madrid and World Economic Forum. She served as chairman for the State Department's Women's Economic Empowerment Working Group, U.S. Advisory Commission on Public Diplomacy and U.S. Secretary of Commerce's Export Conference.

=== Secretary of the Air Force ===
On October 16, 2019, Barrett was confirmed as the 25th secretary of the Air Force by a vote of 85–7. She was sworn in on October 18, 2019. On January 12, 2021, Barrett announced that she would resign as Air Force Secretary a day before January 20 inauguration.

== Academic career ==
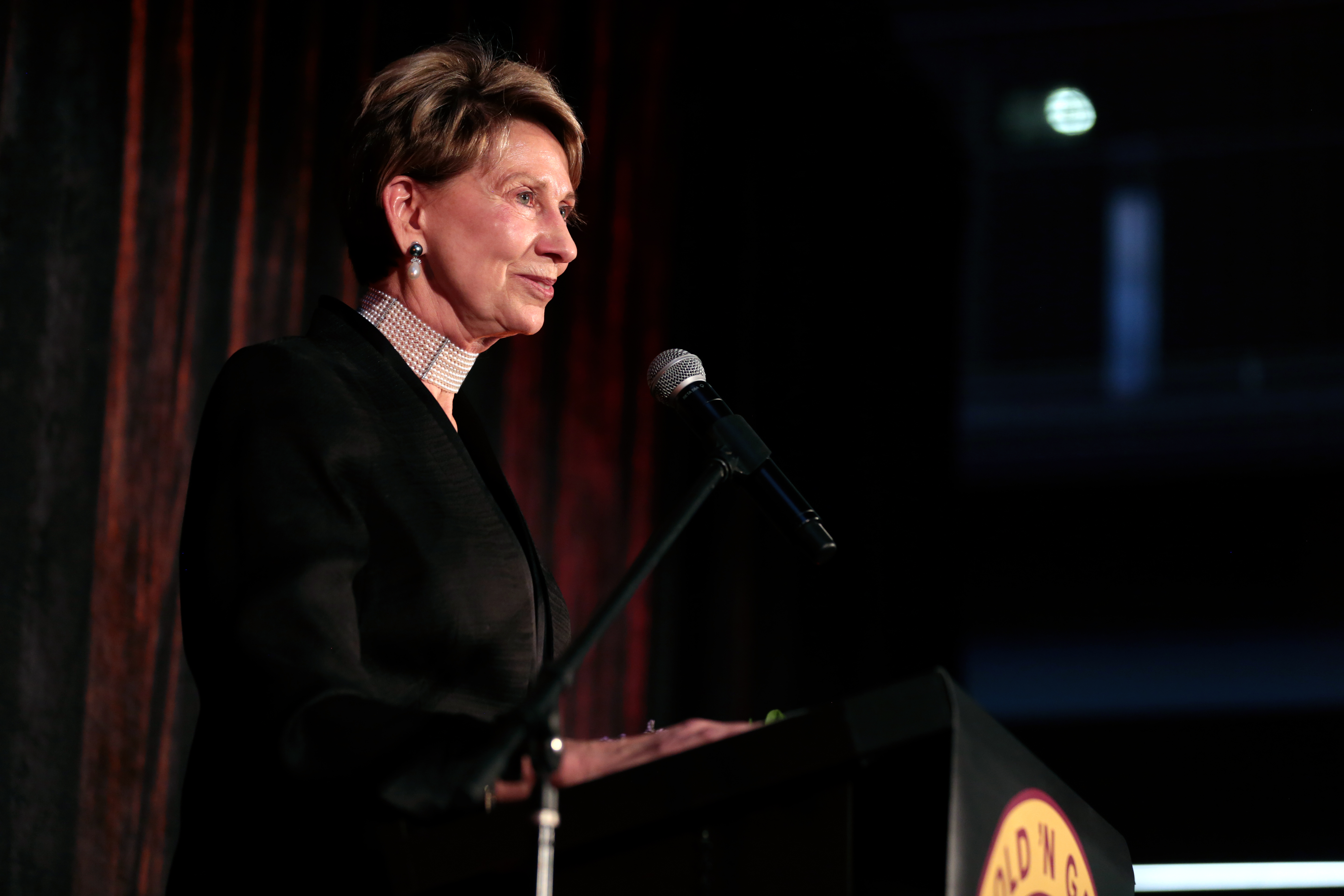
Barrett speaking at Arizona State University's Sandra Day O'Connor College of Law in November 2017

Barrett is a fellow teaching leadership at Harvard University's John F. Kennedy School of Government. In 2012 Barrett was interim president of Thunderbird School of Global Management, now a unit of the Arizona State University Knowledge Enterprise. She was CEO of the American Management Association. As a member of the U.S. Afghan Women's Council, she founded Project Artemis, a program to train and mentor Afghan women entrepreneurs at Thunderbird.

In 2000, Arizona State University renamed its Honors College “The Craig and Barbara Barrett Honors College” or Barrett, The Honors College in recognition of a $10 million donation from Barbara and her husband, the then-CEO of Intel, Craig Barrett.

== Aviation career ==
Barrett is said to be the first civilian woman to land in an F/A-18 Hornet on an aircraft carrier, riding in the back seat. In 2014, Barrett was inducted into the Arizona Aviation Hall of Fame and received the Worcester Polytechnic Institute Presidential Medal from President Laurie Leshin. She is an instrument-rated pilot and trained as an astronaut in 2009 at Star City (Russia), and was the backup spaceflight participant for the Soyuz TMA-16 flight to the International Space Station. Barrett was also deputy director of the Federal Aviation Administration and vice chairman of the U.S. Civil Aeronautics Board.

== Awards and recognition ==
Barrett has been recognized with the Administrators Award for Distinguished Service by the FAA, Office of the Secretary of Defense Medal for Exceptional Public Service, Horatio Alger Award for Distinguished Americans, Wilson Award for Corporate Citizenship and Sandra Day O'Connor Board Excellence Award. Barrett received the 2018 Heritage Award from the Arizona Chamber of Commerce and Industry.

== Personal life ==
Barrett was born on a farm in Indiana County, Pennsylvania. She is married to Craig Barrett, retired chairman and CEO of Intel. She climbed Tanzania's Mount Kilimanjaro in August 2007 and bicycled 900 kilometers throughout Finland while ambassador.

Diplomatic posts
| Preceded by Marilyn Ware | United States Ambassador to Finland; 2008–2009 | Succeeded by Michael Butler |
Political offices
| Preceded by Matthew Donovan; Acting | United States Secretary of the Air Force; 2019–2021 | Succeeded by John P. Roth; Acting |
