= Craig Barrett (chief executive) =

American business executive

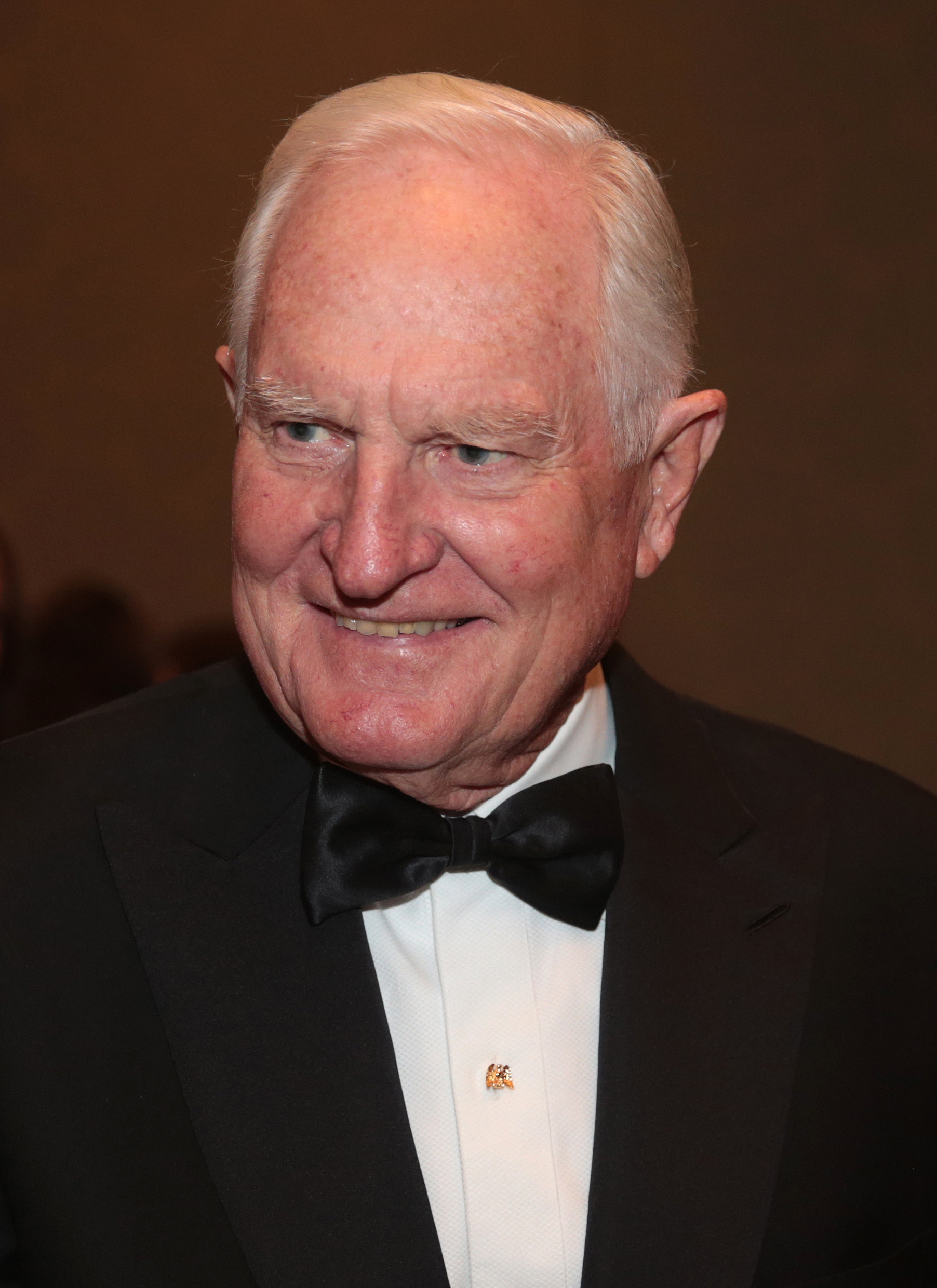
- Barrett in June 2018
- Born: August 29, 1939 (age 87); San Francisco, California, U.S.
- Occupations: Former Chairman and CEO of Intel Corporation
- Predecessor: Andy Grove
- Successor: Paul Otellini
- Spouse: Barbara Barrett

Craig R. Barrett (born August 29, 1939) is an American business executive who served as the chairman of the board of Intel Corporation until May 2009. He became CEO of Intel in 1998, a position he held for seven years. After retiring from Intel, Barrett joined the faculty at Thunderbird School of Global Management in Phoenix.

== Career ==
In 1994, Barrett was elected a member of the National Academy of Engineering for technical leadership in advancing quality and productivity through manufacturing technology in the semiconductor industry.

He was appointed as a member of the Hong Kong Chief Executive's Council of International Advisers in the years of 1998–2005. He joined the board of trustees of the Society for Science & the Public in 2010.

He serves as president and chairman of BASIS School Inc., a charter school group as well as chair of the board of directors for the National Forest Foundation, the nonprofit partner to the U.S. Forest Service.

=== Employment at Intel Corporation ===
Barrett was employed by Intel Corporation in 1974 as a manager. He was promoted to vice president of the corporation in 1984, to senior vice president in 1987, and executive vice president in 1990. Barrett was elected to Intel's board of directors in 1992 and was named the company's chief operating officer in 1993. He served as Intel's fourth president starting in May 1997 and its chief executive officer from 1998 to 2005. He successfully led the corporation through some of its worst times, including the burst of the dot-com bubble and a severe recession.

He became chairman of the board in May 2005, when he was succeeded as CEO by Paul Otellini. In January 2009, he announced that he would be stepping down as chairman and member of the board at the annual stockholders' meeting in May 2009.

== Education ==
Barrett attended Stanford University from 1957 to 1964 and received a Ph.D. in Materials Science. During his time at Stanford, he joined the Kappa Sigma fraternity. After graduation, he joined the Stanford University Department of Materials Science and Engineering and remained there until 1974. Barrett was NATO Postdoctoral Fellow at the National Physical Laboratory in the United Kingdom from 1964 to 1965.

Craig and his wife Barbara gave a $10 million endowment to Arizona State University in 2000. In recognition of their donation, Arizona State renamed their honors program Barrett, The Honors College.

== Awards and publications ==
In 1969, Barrett received the Robert Lansing Hardy Award of the Minerals, Metals & Materials Society and remains a member of the National Academy of Engineering. He is the author of over forty technical papers dealing with the influence of microstructure on the properties of materials and co-authored a textbook on materials science, The Principles of Engineering Materials, along with UCLA professor Alan S. Tetelman (founder of Exponent, Inc.) and Stanford professor William D. Nix, published by Prentice-Hall in 1973, which remains in use today.

On January 31, 2006, Barrett and his wife were awarded the Woodrow Wilson Award for Corporate Citizenship by the Woodrow Wilson International Center for Scholars.

On June 28, 2009, he was announced the 2009 Laureate of the Global Award of the President of Armenia for Outstanding Contribution to Humanity through IT.

On June 27, 2014, Trinity College Dublin awarded him with an honorary doctorate.

== Family ==
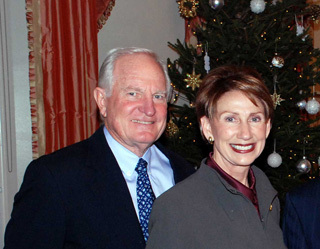
Craig and Barbara Barrett at the U.S. Embassy in Helsinki, Christmas 2008

Barrett is married to Barbara McConnell Barrett, who was the United States Ambassador to Finland from 2008 to 2009. She was the Secretary of the Air Force under the first Trump administration. Barrett and his wife own Triple Creek Ranch in Darby, Montana.

== See also ==
- List of chief executive officers

Business positions
Preceded by Andrew Grove	CEO, Intel; 1998–2005	Succeeded by Paul Otellini
