= Kristyn E. Jones =

American defense official

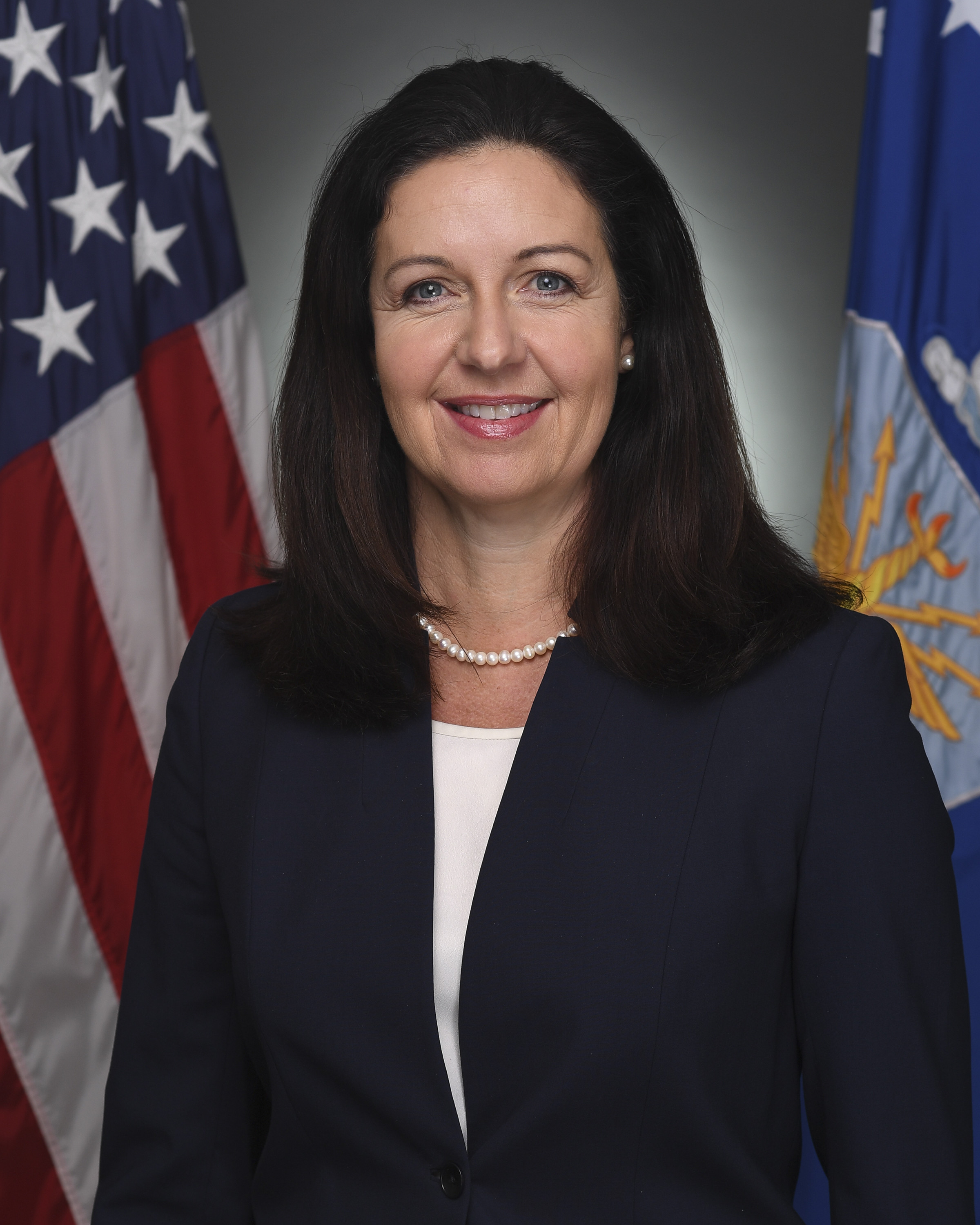

Assistant Secretary of the Air Force (Financial Management & Comptroller)
- In office May 29, 2024 – July 10, 2024
- President: Joe Biden
- Secretary: Frank Kendall III
- Preceded by: Carlos Rodgers (performing the duties of)
- Succeeded by: Philip Weinberg

Under Secretary of the Air Force
- Acting; March 6, 2023 – May 29, 2024
- President: Joe Biden
- Secretary: Frank Kendall III
- Preceded by: Gina Ortiz Jones
- Succeeded by: Melissa Dalton

Assistant Secretary of the Air Force (Financial Management & Comptroller)
- In office May 4, 2022 – March 6, 2023
- President: Joe Biden
- Secretary: Frank Kendall
- Preceded by: John P. Roth
- Succeeded by: Carlos Rodgers (performing the duties of)

Personal details
- Education: United States Military Academy (BS); George Mason University (MBA)

Military service
- Allegiance: United States
- Branch/service: United States Army

Kristyn E. Jones is an American defense official who was the second woman to serve as Assistant Secretary of the Air Force (Financial Management & Comptroller).

== Early life and education ==
Jones was raised in Mission Viejo, California and graduated from the United States Military Academy in 1993. She commissioned in the military intelligence branch. After graduating, Jones served in the Army for five years in Germany and Virginia. After leaving the Army in 1998, Jones earned an MBA from George Mason University.

== Career ==
Jones spent 13 years as a Department of Defense financial professional working with the Department of the Navy, Business Transformation Agency, and the Department of the Army. Her last role as a civil servant was serving as the Deputy Assistant Secretary of the Army for Financial Information Management until August 2014.

Jones transitioned to the private sector, joining KPMG after leaving the federal government. At KPMG, she was the managing director of the federal advisory practice.

On January 10, 2022, President Biden nominated Jones to be the Assistant Secretary of the Air Force (Financial Management & Comptroller). She was subsequently confirmed on April 28 and sworn in on May 4.

She was performing the duties of the Under Secretary of the Air Force from March 2023 to May 2024 due to the resignation of Gina Ortiz Jones. Following the appointment of Melissa Dalton as Under Secretary of the Air Force, Jones returned to the role of Assistant Secretary of the Air Force for Financial Management and Comptroller but went on to resign from the position just over a month later and was succeeded by her deputy, Carlos Rodgers.

Political offices
Preceded by John P. Roth	Assistant Secretary of the Air Force (Financial Management & Comptroller); 2022–2024	Succeeded by Philip Weinberg
