= Paul Otellini =

Former CEO of Intel (1950–2017)

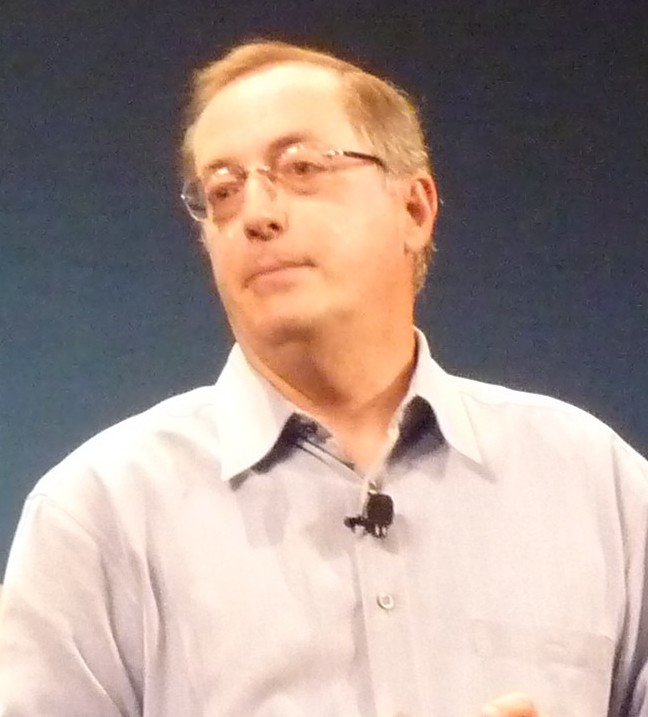
- Otellini in 2010
- Born: October 12, 1950; San Francisco, California, U.S.
- Died: October 2, 2017 (aged 66); Kenwood, California, U.S.
- Education: St. Ignatius College Preparatory
- Alma mater: University of San Francisco; University of California, Berkeley
- Occupations: Ex-president and ex-CEO of Intel
- Predecessor: Craig Barrett
- Successor: Brian Krzanich
- Board member of: Google
- Website: Paul Otellini - Intel.com

Paul Stevens Otellini (October 12, 1950 – October 2, 2017) was an American businessman who was president and CEO of Intel. He was also on the board of directors of Google.

== Early life and education ==
Otellini was born and raised in San Francisco, California, United States. His family is of Italian origin. Otellini graduated from St. Ignatius College Preparatory and held a bachelor's degree in economics from the University of San Francisco earned in 1972. He received an MBA from the Haas School of Business at the University of California, Berkeley in 1974.

== Employment at Intel ==
Otellini joined Intel in 1974, Otellini was appointed an operating group vice president in 1988, elected as an Intel corporate officer in 1991, and made senior vice president in 1993. He was general manager of the Microprocessor Products Group, leading the introduction of the Pentium microprocessor that followed in 1993. He also managed Intel's business with IBM, was general manager of both the Peripheral Components Operation and the Folsom Microcomputer Division, where he was responsible for the company's chipset operations, and was a technical assistant to then-Intel president Andrew Grove.

He was promoted to executive vice president in 1996. From 1998 to 2002, he was executive vice president and general manager of the Intel Architecture Group, responsible for the company's microprocessor and chipset businesses and strategies for desktop, mobile and enterprise computing. From 1996 to 1998, Otellini was executive vice president of sales and marketing and from 1994 to 1996 as senior vice president and general manager of sales and marketing.

In 2002, he was elected to the board of directors and became president and Chief Operating Officer at the company. On May 18, 2005, he succeeded Craig Barrett as the new CEO of Intel. Otellini was considered a departure from the norm as he was the first Intel CEO who was not an engineer.

Otellini is reported to have been a major force in convincing Apple Inc. in the Apple-to-Intel transition, and being very fond of Mac OS X, saying Microsoft's Windows Vista is "closer to the Mac than we've been on the Windows side for a long time".

In 2006, he oversaw the then-largest round of layoffs in Intel history when 10,500 (or 10% of the corporate workforce) employees were laid-off. Job cuts in manufacturing, product design, and other redundancies, were made in an effort to save $3 billion/year in cost by 2008. Of the 10,500 jobs, 1,000 layoffs were at the management level. In 2007, Otellini announced plans to build a $3 billion semiconductor manufacturing plant in the port city of Dalian, China.

In 2006, Otellini was named Haas Business Leader of the Year. Nevertheless, in hindsight, Otellini has made the strategic mistake of ignoring the mobile processor market, and also did not develop credible technology to counter ARM-based architecture. These missteps, combined with missed product cycles under Otellini's successors, would come back to haunt Intel over a decade later.

On November 19, 2012, Otellini announced his intention to retire in May 2013.

== Personal life ==
Otellini died in his sleep on October 2, 2017, at his home in Sonoma County, California. He was survived by his second wife, of 30 years, Sandy Otellini; his son, Patrick; and his daughter, Alexis.

Business positions
Preceded by Craig Barrett	CEO, Intel; 2005–2013	Succeeded by Brian Krzanich
