= Matthew Donovan =

United States Air Force veteran and government official (born 1958)

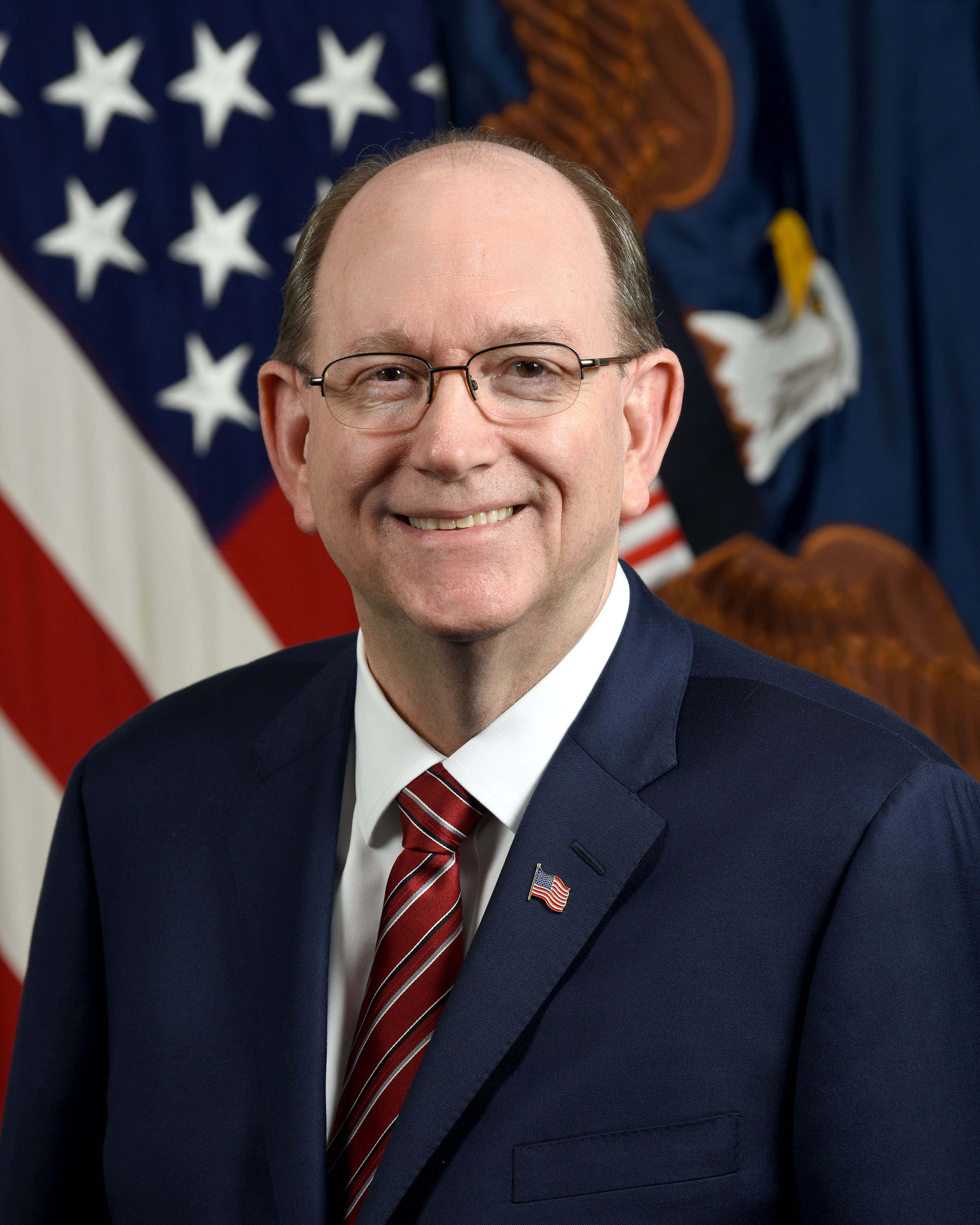
- Official portrait, 2020

9th United States Under Secretary of Defense for Personnel and Readiness
- In office March 23, 2020 – January 20, 2021
- President: Donald Trump
- Preceded by: Robert Wilkie
- Succeeded by: Gil Cisneros

26th United States Under Secretary of the Air Force
- In office August 3, 2017 – December 27, 2019
- President: Donald Trump
- Preceded by: Lisa Disbrow
- Succeeded by: Gina Ortiz Jones

United States Secretary of the Air Force
- Acting; June 1, 2019 – October 18, 2019
- President: Donald Trump
- Deputy: John P. Roth (acting)
- Preceded by: Heather Wilson
- Succeeded by: Barbara Barrett

Personal details
- Born: 1957 or 1958 (age 67–68) Hancock, New Hampshire, U.S.
- Party: Republican
- Education: Regis University (BS); Webster University (MS); Air University (MMAS); United States Army Command and General Staff College (MMAS)

Military service
- Allegiance: United States
- Branch/service: United States Air Force
- Years of service: 1977–2008
- Rank: Colonel
- Awards: Defense Superior Service Medal; Legion of Merit; Defense Meritorious Service Medal
- *John P. Roth served as Acting Under Secretary from June 1, 2019 – October 18, 2019 while Donovan served as Acting Secretary.

Matthew P. Donovan (born 1958) is a United States Air Force veteran and government official who served as the United States Under Secretary of Defense for Personnel and Readiness from March 23, 2020 to January 20, 2021. He also served as United States Under Secretary of the Air Force from August 3, 2017 to December 27, 2019. He had simultaneously served as the Acting United States Secretary of the Air Force from June 1, 2019 to October 18, 2019. Donovan previously served as majority policy director for the United States Senate Committee on Armed Services. Donovan served 31 years in the U.S. Air Force, retiring as a colonel. His service included tours as commander of the U.S. Air Force Officer Training School and of the 95th Fighter Squadron.

== Education ==
- 1981: Bachelor of Science in Technical Management, Regis University
- 1986: Squadron Officer School
- 1995: Master of Science in Management, Webster University
- 1997: Air Command and Staff College (distinguished graduate)
- 1998: Master of Airpower Art and Science, School of Advanced Air and Space Studies of Air University
- 2004: Master of Military Art and Science, School of Advanced Military Studies of United States Army Command and General Staff College

Political offices
Preceded by Lisa Disbrow	United States Under Secretary of the Air Force; 2017–2019	Succeeded by Shon J. Manasco; Acting
Preceded by Heather Wilson	United States Secretary of the Air Force; Acting; 2019	Succeeded by Barbara Barrett
Preceded by Robert Wilkie	United States Under Secretary of Defense for Personnel and Readiness; 2020–2021	Succeeded by Gil Cisneros
