= Deborah Lee James =

United States Secretary of the Air Force

Deborah James
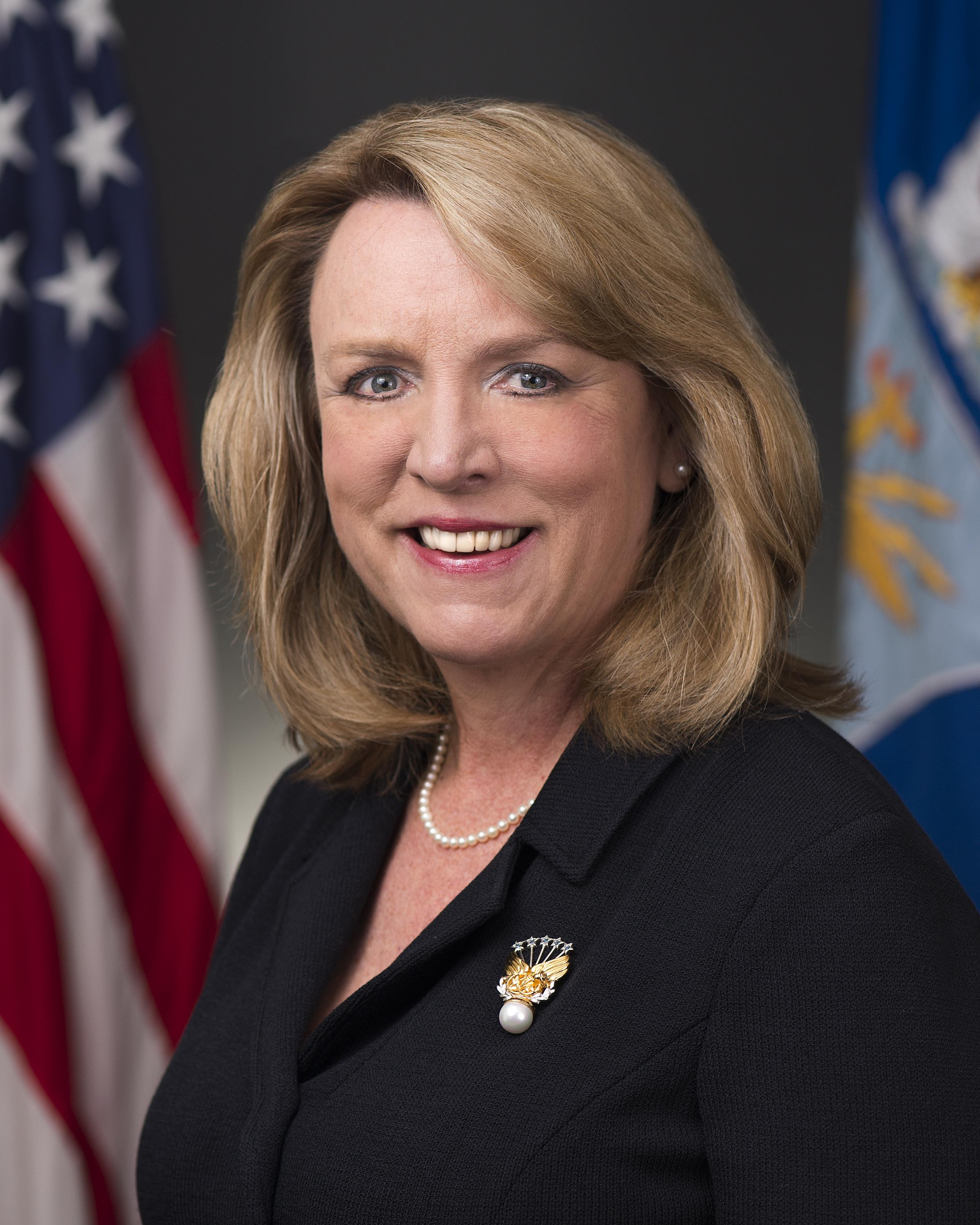

23rd United States Secretary of the Air Force
- In office December 20, 2013 – January 20, 2017
- President: Barack Obama
- Deputy: Eric Fanning; Lisa Disbrow
- Preceded by: Michael B. Donley
- Succeeded by: Heather Wilson

3rd Assistant Secretary of Defense for Reserve Affairs
- In office June 1, 1993 – April 11, 1998
- President: Bill Clinton
- Preceded by: Stephen Duncan
- Succeeded by: Charles Cragin

Personal details
- Born: Deborah Lynn Roche; November 25, 1958 (age 67) Long Branch, New Jersey, U.S.
- Party: Democratic
- Spouse: Frank Beatty
- Education: Duke University (BA); Columbia University (MIA)

Deborah Roche Lee James (born November 25, 1958) served as the 23rd Secretary of the Air Force. She is the second woman after Sheila Widnall to hold this position.

James was confirmed as 23rd Secretary of the Air Force on December 13, 2013, and started her tenure on December 20, 2013. In her position she was responsible for the affairs of the United States Department of the Air Force, including the organization, training, and equipping 690,000 active-duty, Guard, Reserve, and civilian personnel. She oversaw the Air Force's annual budget ($139 billion in 2015).

During her tenure she confronted issues stemming from the USAF budget sequestration in 2013, continued troubles with the Lockheed Martin F-35 Lightning II, Congressional investigation of the USAF for its handling of sexual assaults, and a drug and cheating scandal inside the Air Force Global Strike Command (AFGSC).

== Early life and career ==
James was born in Long Branch, New Jersey, in 1958. She grew up in nearby Rumson and graduated from Rumson-Fair Haven Regional High School in 1976. She earned her B.A. (May 1979) in Comparative Area Studies from Duke University in Durham, North Carolina, and later earned her master's degree (May 1981) in International Affairs from Columbia University in New York City.

From 1983 to 1993, James worked as a professional staff member on the House Armed Services Committee, where she served as a senior adviser to the Military Personnel and Compensation Subcommittee, the NATO Burden Sharing Panel, and the Chairman's Member Services team.

During the Clinton administration, from 1993 to 1998, James served in the Pentagon as the Assistant Secretary of Defense for Reserve Affairs. In that position, she was senior advisor to the Secretary of Defense. Prior to her Senate confirmation in 1993, she served as an assistant to the Assistant Secretary of Defense for Legislative Affairs.

James held a variety of positions with Science Applications International Corporation (SAIC) and from 2000 to 2001 she was executive vice president and chief operating officer at Business Executives for National Security. From 1998 to 2000 she was vice president of international operations and marketing at United Technologies. Prior to being named Secretary of the Air Force, she served as president of SAIC's Technical and Engineering Sector. James has 30 years of senior homeland and national security bureaucratic and administrative experience in the U.S. federal government and the private sector.

She is also a member of the Atlantic Council's Board of Directors.

== Secretary of the Air Force ==
=== Malmstrom Air Force Base controversy ===
James was confronted by reports of morale problems in the ranks of the AFGSC within a month of assuming office. The Air Force Office of Special Investigations had been looking into alleged use of synthetic drugs by the airmen of the 341st Missile Wing at Malmstrom Air Force Base in Montana. During the probe it was learned that cheating on monthly proficiency exams was taking place. Altogether, 92 officers were identified as involved in the cheating scandal.

James responded by saying, "this was a failure of some of our Airmen; it was not a failure of the nuclear mission." Within a year she visited the three Air Force bases that operate intercontinental ballistic missiles (ICBM's) to identify and resolve problems leading to morale issues at the bases. James cited USAF's inattention to the nuclear mission, to the point of using a simple test score as "a top differentiator, if not the sole differentiator on who gets promoted," as one of the reasons for morale deterioration in the ICBM force.

She helped establish the Force Improvement Program (FIP), a grass-roots feedback program designed to quickly identify actionable recommendations. FIP identified more than 300 recommendations for improvement. Immediate improvements included funding to upgrade launch control centers, the underground bunkers where airmen and support staff serve 36-hour shifts 'round the clock; more and better options to transport airmen to LCCs, additional manpower, as well as higher pay.

James also oversaw the establishment of the Nuclear Deterrence Operations Service Medal which is awarded for providing effective nuclear deterrence for the nation.

Addressing the 2011–2013 Malmstrom Air Force Base debacle two years later at Aspen Security Forum, James said that, "We never found evidence of cheating beyond that one base, but we did find evidence of systemic problems across the board," which were addressed by increased training, additional incentives, and better development opportunities.

=== Reducing the size of the Air Force ===
With a congressional mandate to reduce the size of the Air Force, James decided to make cuts in one or two fiscal years instead of the prevailing five year period. James noted that the downsizing was straining the force. She confirmed that the Air Force was able to achieve force size and shape goals in fiscal year 2014, alleviating the need to conduct involuntary force management programs in fiscal year 2015. She made this announcement during an online town hall meeting. The Air Force began 2014 fiscal year with 330,700 active-duty airmen; by November 6, 2014 this had dropped to 316,500 - the smallest since Air Force establishment in 1947.

=== RPA manning issue ===
Of particular concern was the strain on airmen in support of remotely piloted aircraft (RPA) operations. RPA operations had surged nine times over an eight year period. With increased operations tempo, expiring active duty service commitments and reductions to the force, then current projections saw more RPA pilots departing than the Air Force would be able to replace via the training pipeline. Balancing Air Force ISR (intelligence, surveillance, and reconnaissance) capability with finite resources remained a top priority. James instituted a monthly incentive pay program in 2015 which was previously not permitted for RPA pilots. Pay was increased significantly to incentivize RPA pilots to remain in the program beyond their six-year commitment.

== Identifying then current issues and threats ==
In 2015, James stated that half of the Air Force pilots were "not sufficiently ready" for a fight against an opponent with "integrated air defenses and surface-to-air missiles." This despite prior technological investments including fifth generation fighters like the F-35 and F-22.

In addition to terrorism, James identified Russia as "the biggest threat" to U.S. national security.

== Personal life ==
Her first marriage to Maryland real estate broker and developer E. Brooke Lee Jr. ended in divorce. They had a son and a daughter.

In April 1996, Deborah Roche Lee, then Assistant Secretary of Defense for Reserve Affairs, became embroiled in controversy when she was named as a co-defendant in a civil lawsuit alleging that her husband, Maryland developer and political heir E. Brooke Lee Jr., had molested a 14-year-old babysitter. The suit accused her of negligence in allowing contact between her husband and the minor. At the time on official travel in Korea, she cut her trip short to return to Washington after learning of the case. During settlement talks, she demanded that her husband transfer his stock holdings into their joint names, ensuring that she would inherit his entire estate upon his death. In her deposition, she denied any knowledge of prior incidents involving minors, though she admitted awareness of his advances toward adult women. Her insistence on securing control of the family fortune, alongside her legal defense, made her a central figure in the scandal's resolution.

As of this writing she is married to Frank Beatty.

== See also ==
- List of U.S. Secretaries of the Air Force

Political offices
Preceded by Michael B. Donley	United States Secretary of the Air Force; 2013–2017	Succeeded by Heather Wilson
