= Lisa Disbrow =

US Air Force officer and defense civil servant (born 1962)

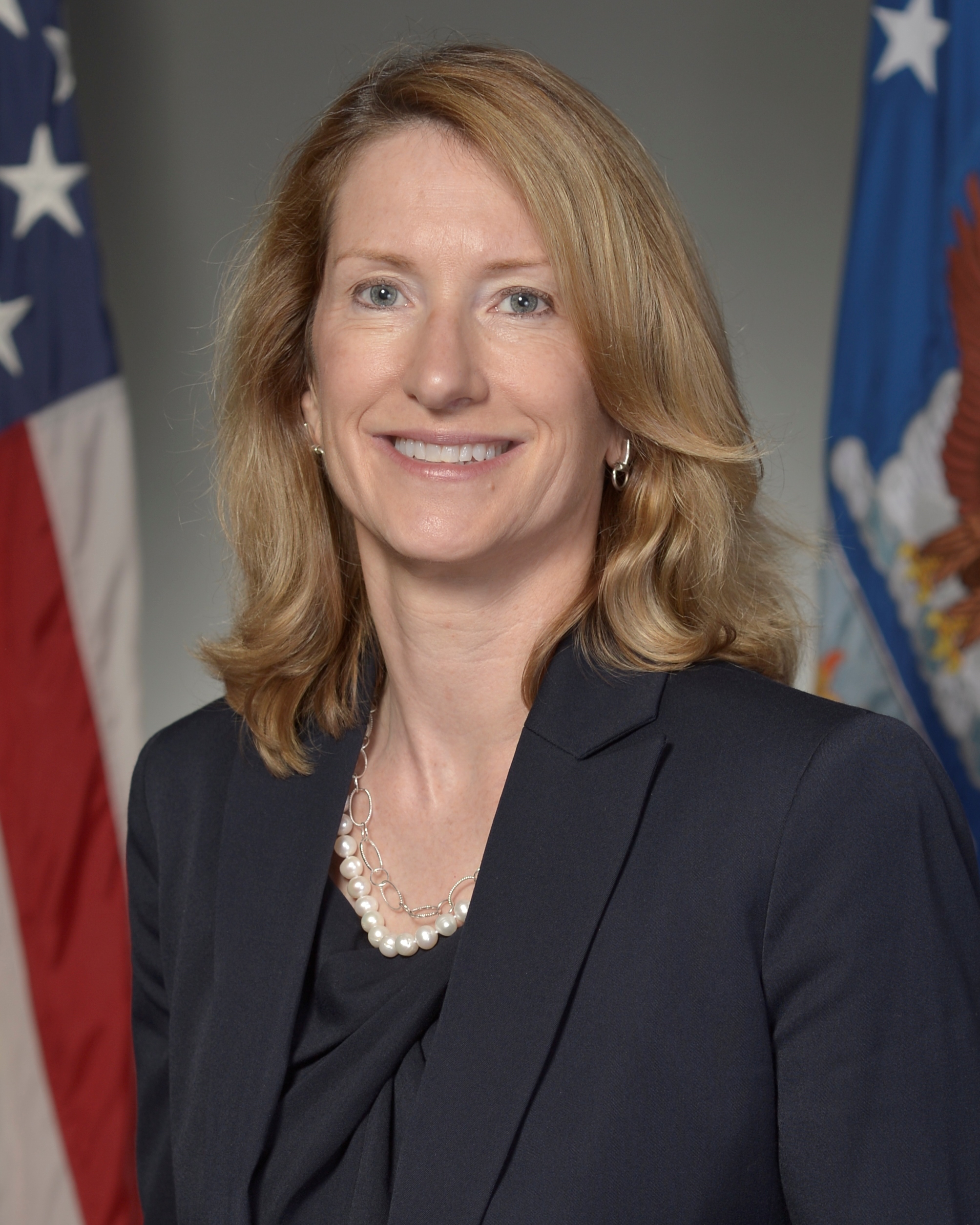

United States Secretary of the Air Force
- Acting
- In office January 20, 2017 – May 16, 2017
- President: Donald Trump
- Preceded by: Deborah Lee James
- Succeeded by: Heather Wilson

United States Under Secretary of the Air Force
- In office March 30, 2015 – June 30, 2017; Acting: March 30, 2015 – February 24, 2016
- President: Barack Obama; Donald Trump
- Preceded by: Eric Fanning
- Succeeded by: Matthew Donovan

Personal details
- Born: Lisa Kay Stephens; September 29, 1962 (age 64) Clifton Forge, Virginia, U.S.
- Education: University of Virginia (BA); George Washington University (MA); National Defense University (MS)

Military service
- Allegiance: United States
- Branch/service: United States Air Force: US Air Force Reserve
- Years of service: 1985-2008
- Rank: Colonel
- Battles/wars: Operation Desert storm

Lisa Stephens Disbrow (born September 29, 1962) is a former United States Under Secretary of the Air Force. From January 20 to May 16, 2017, she served as the Acting United States Secretary of the Air Force until Heather Wilson assumed the office. Previously, Disbrow served as Acting Under Secretary of the Air Force from January 2015 until she was confirmed by the Senate as Under Secretary in January 2016. She was also the first woman to serve as the Assistant Secretary of the Air Force for Financial Management and Comptroller from 2014 to 2016. She currently serves as a member of the President's Export Council after her appointment from President Biden in February 2023.

== Education and career ==
Disbrow graduated from the University of Virginia in 1984 and served as a commissioned officer in the United States Air Force, working primarily in intelligence. In 1992, after Operation Desert storm, she left active duty and continued to serve in the US Air Force Reserve. She continued her intelligence work both in her civilian work as a senior systems engineer for the National Reconnaissance Office and in her AF reserve role.

From 1995 to 2014, Disbrow held a variety of positions on the Joint Staff as a senior civilian, including the Joint Staff Vice Director for Force Structure, Resources and Assessment. While assigned to the Joint Staff, from 2006 to 2007 Disbrow was detailed to the president's National Security Advisor as the special advisor for policy implementation and execution at the White House. She assisted in planning and implementing the National Security Strategy and advised the White House on issues across the federal government.

Her twenty-three years of uniformed service culminated in 2008 when she retired as a colonel from the Air Force Reserve while serving as special assistant to the director of programs, Headquarters Air Force.

Disbrow resigned her position as Under Secretary of the Air Force on June 30, 2017.

Disbrow currently serves as a Director on the Board of Mercury Systems (July 2017); BlackBerry(August 2019); the Sequa Corp and she Chairs the Board for Hensoldt, Inc. In 2022 when LMI sold its for-profit subsidiary, which retained the LMI name, the remaining entity was re-branded as the nonprofit NobleReach Foundation. Lisa Disbrow became the chair of the NobleReach board. In February 2022, Defense Secretary Lloyd Austin appointed her to the Commission on Planning, Programming, Budgeting and Execution (PPBE) Reform then in December 2023, Defense Secretary Lloyd Austin appointed Disbrow as chair of the Department of Defense Reserve Forces Policy Board (RFPB).

She is a Senior Fellow at the Johns Hopkins University Applied Physics Laboratory and serves on the board of the Wounded Warrior Project.

In November 2024, Disbrow was elected chair of the board of directors for the National Defense Industrial Association (NDIA).

Furthermore, Disbrow served as a Special Government Employee (SGE) member of the Reserve Forces Policy Board, listed as an independent consultant, from October 24, 2024, to March 12, 2025.

Political offices
| Preceded by Eric Fanning | United States Under Secretary of the Air Force; 2015–2017; Acting: 2015–2016 | Succeeded by Matthew Donovan |
| Preceded by Deborah James | United States Secretary of the Air Force; Acting; 2017 | Succeeded by Heather Wilson |
