= Frank Kendall III =

US Secretary of the Air Force from 2021 to 2025

Frank Kendall
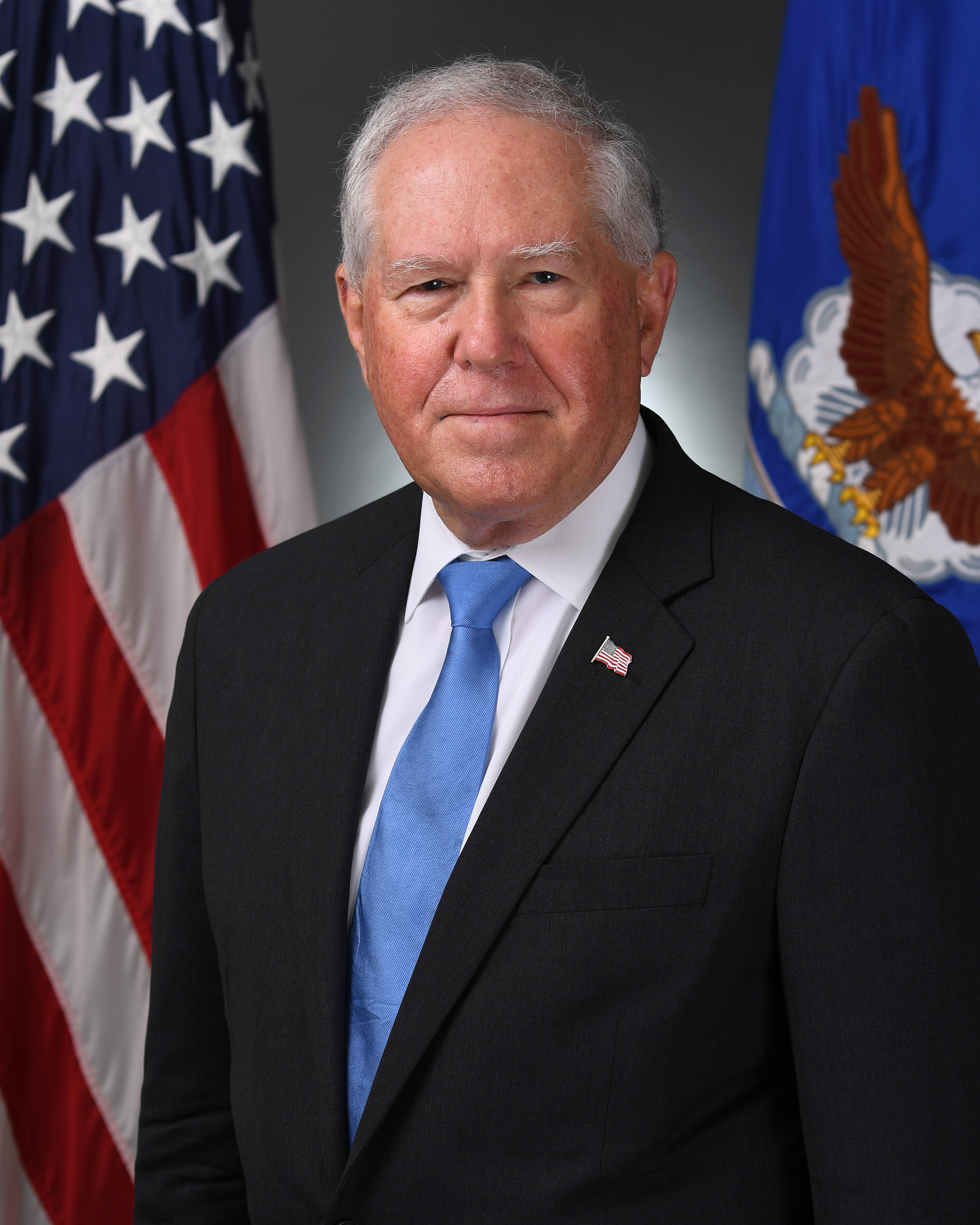
- Official portrait, 2021

26th United States Secretary of the Air Force
- In office July 28, 2021 – January 20, 2025
- President: Joe Biden
- Deputy: Gina Ortiz Jones; Kristyn E. Jones (acting); Melissa Dalton
- Preceded by: Barbara Barrett
- Succeeded by: Troy Meink

Under Secretary of Defense for Acquisition, Technology and Logistics
- In office October 6, 2011 – January 20, 2017
- President: Barack Obama
- Preceded by: Ash Carter
- Succeeded by: Ellen Lord

Personal details
- Born: January 26, 1949 (age 77) Pittsfield, Massachusetts, U.S.
- Party: Democratic
- Education: United States Military Academy (BS); California Institute of Technology (MS); Long Island University (MBA); Georgetown University (JD)
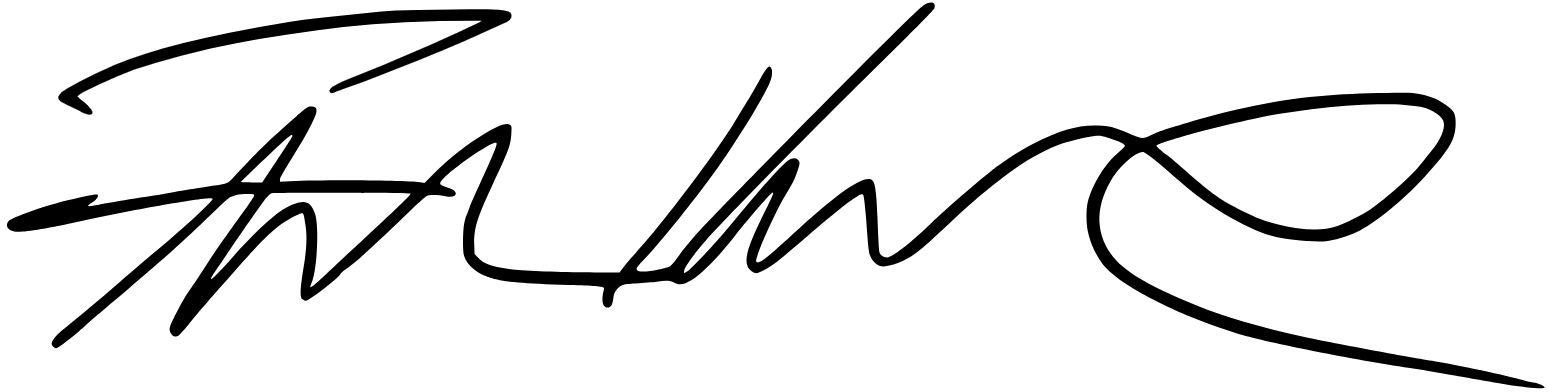
- Signature

Military service
- Allegiance: United States
- Branch/service: United States Army; U.S. Army Reserve
- Rank: Lieutenant Colonel

Frank Kendall III (born January 26, 1949) is an American engineer, lawyer and executive who served as the 26th United States secretary of the Air Force from 2021 to 2025. He has served in several senior positions in the U.S. Department of Defense. A West Point graduate (Class of 1971, Distinguished Graduate), he retired as a lieutenant colonel from the U.S. Army Reserve. From 2011 to 2017, Kendall served as the under secretary of defense for acquisition, technology and logistics in the Obama administration. He is a member of the Democratic Party.

== Early career ==
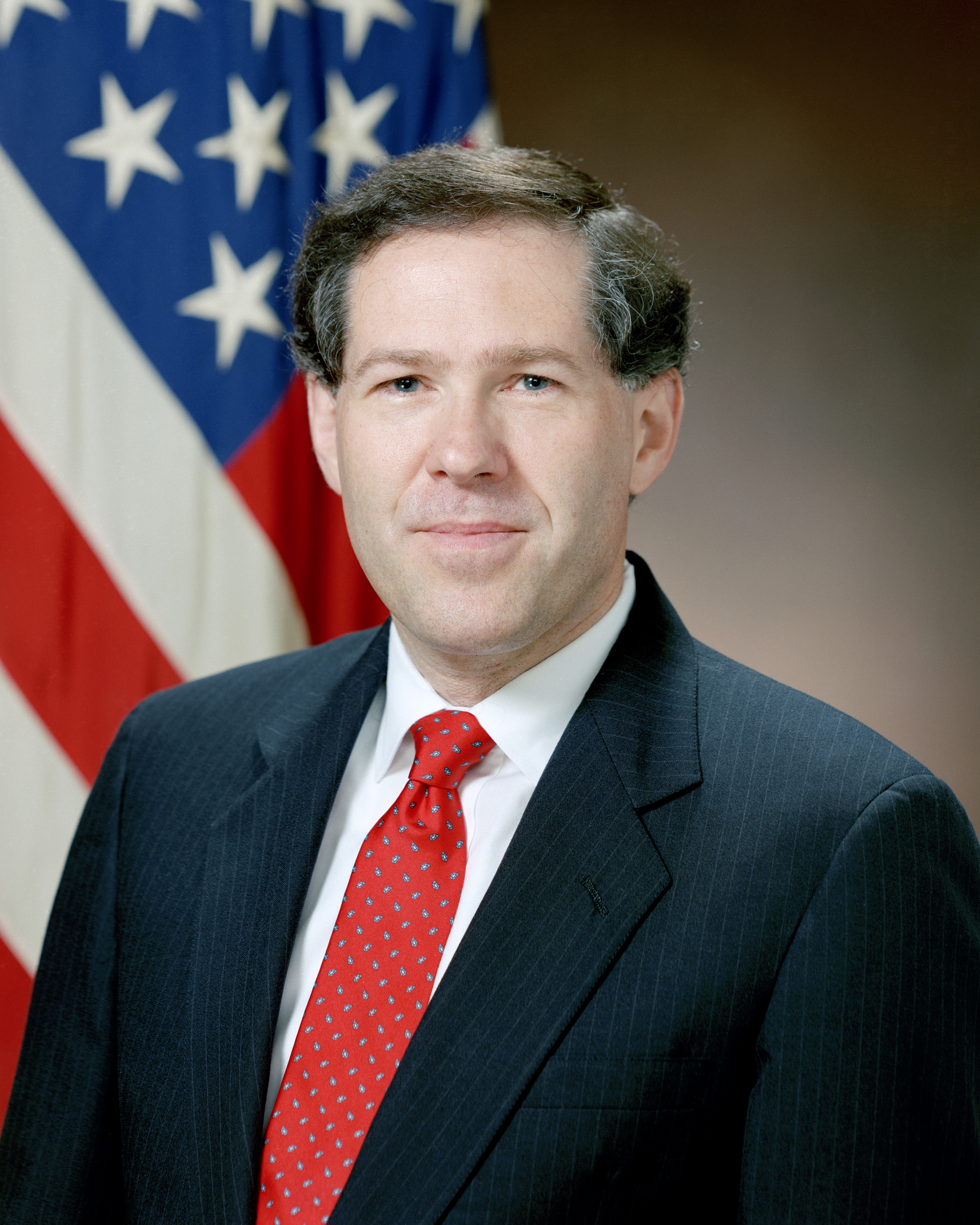
Kendall during his tenure as acting Deputy Director, 1989

Kendall began his career as a U.S. Army officer. After several assignments including postings to Germany and teaching engineering at West Point, he joined the civil service working as a systems engineer in missile defense. In 1986, he became the Assistant Deputy Under Secretary for Strategic Defense Systems as a member of the Senior Executive Service. From 1989 to 1994, he served as acting and then permanent Deputy Director of Defense Research and Engineering with responsibility for all U.S. conventional weapon systems research and development programs. After leaving government service in 1994, Kendall served as Corporate Vice President of Engineering at Raytheon and later as a consultant. During this period, Kendall acquired a J.D. degree from Georgetown University Law Center and worked on a pro bono basis as a human rights attorney.

== Obama administration ==
In 2010 Kendall returned to government, first as Principal Under Secretary and then Under Secretary of Defense for Acquisition, Technology and Logistics.

During his tenure as Under Secretary, Kendall implemented policies that led to substantial improvements in the cost and schedule performance of the Defense Department's weapons acquisition programs. In 2016, he was recognized as Person of the Year by Aviation Week and Space Technology for his cost control efforts. In addition to the policy changes he initiated and executed under the "Better Buying Power" initiatives he directly oversaw over 50 of the largest defense weapons programs. Examples include the F-35 Joint Strike Fighter program where he froze production for two years to incentivize efforts to stabilize the design, the GPS 3 ground system, OCX, where he led the effort to restructure and complete this troubled program. He oversaw the initiation of the development of the B-21 Long Range Strike Bomber which is currently executing to plan. He formulated and led the effort to acquire the Military Health System GENESIS (MHS GENESIS) program, modern healthcare management system that has been adopted by the Department of Veterans Affairs as well as the Defense Department. Kendall led the effort to support operations in Iraq and Afghanistan with rapid acquisition programs and he led the effort to remove Syrian chemical weapons from that country and destroy them at sea. Kendall was a major sponsor for innovation, launching the Defense Advanced Research Projects Agency led Aerospace Innovation Initiative. He raised alarms about Chinese military modernization and the threat it posed to U.S. conventional military superiority. While in office he authored the articles on defense acquisition that he compiled in his book "Getting Defense Acquisition Right".

== Biden administration ==
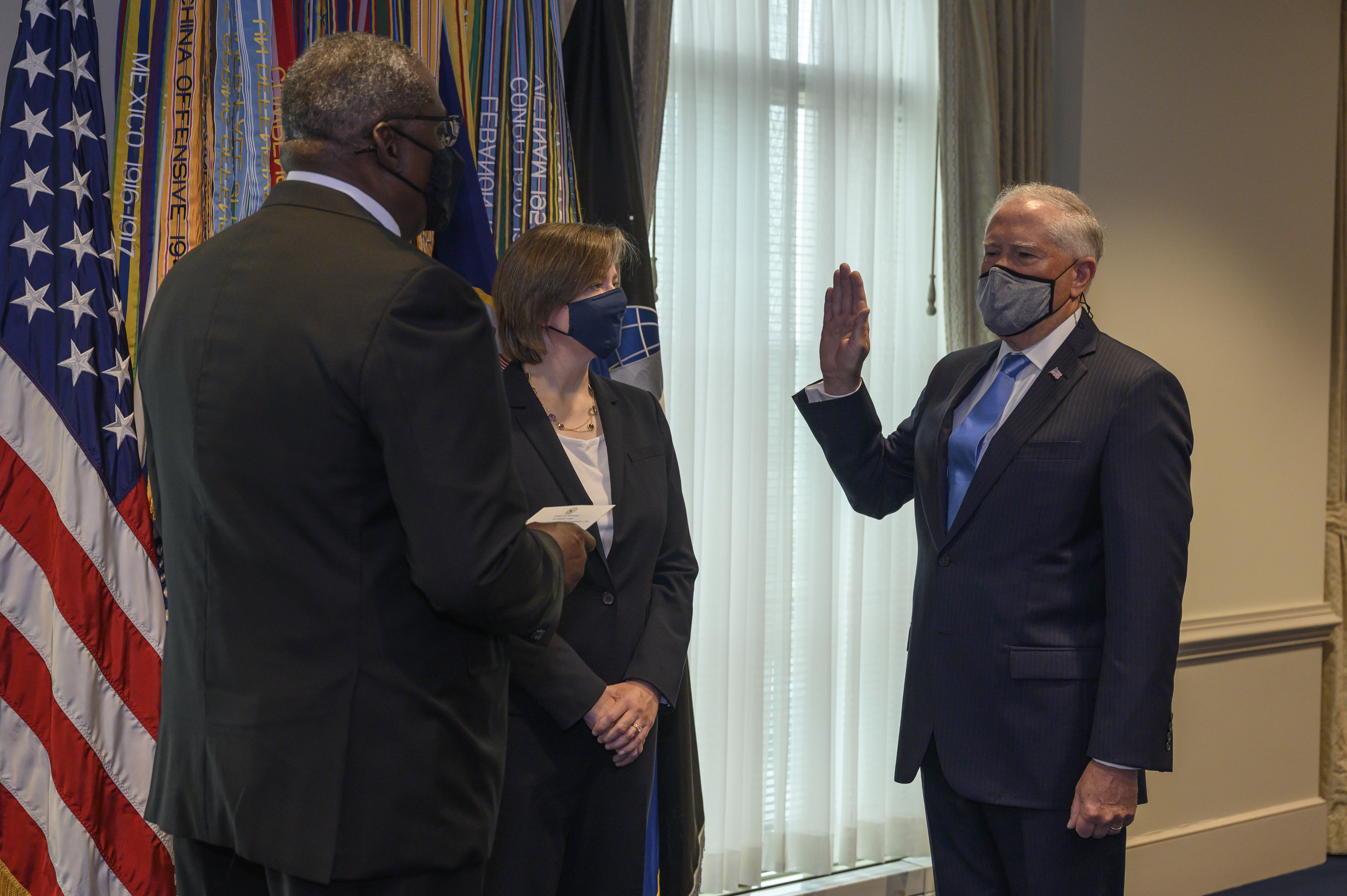
Kendall is sworn in as the 26th secretary of the Air Force by Secretary of Defense General Lloyd Austin at the Pentagon, Washington, D.C., August 4, 2021.

On April 27, 2021, President Joe Biden announced Kendall as his nominee to be the 26th secretary of the Air Force. His Senate confirmation occurred after almost three months of deliberation, due to holds by senators Mike Lee, Gary Peters and Elizabeth Warren, the latter of whom released her hold after Kendall agreed to extend his post-governmental recusal agreements from two to four years. Kendall was eventually confirmed by voice vote on June 26, 2021, administratively sworn in on July 28, 2021 and ceremonially sworn in by Secretary of Defense Lloyd Austin on August 4, 2021.

== Trump administration revocation of security clearance ==
In August 2026, the Trump administration revoked Kendall's security clearance and barred him from holding any sensitive government position for allegedly disclosing sensitive information about Air Force One's capabilities to an unnamed media outlet. On July 7, Trump had used a Qatari-donated jet to fly to the NATO summit in Turkey but one of the older Air Force One planes to fly out the next day, reportedly at the urging of the Secret Service because the Qatari-donated plane lacked some of the advanced security features of the older planes. A July 9 New York Times article about the Qatari-donated jet had cited Kendall saying that there had not been enough time for "all the normal Air Force One modifications", indicating that "some mix of security, communications and support is missing" and that he was surprised to see it used outside the U.S.

Political offices
Preceded by Ash Carter	Under Secretary of Defense for Acquisition, Technology, and Logistics; 2011–2017	Succeeded by Jimmy MacStravic; Acting
Preceded by John P. Roth; Acting	United States Secretary of the Air Force; 2021–2025	Succeeded by Gary A. Ashworth; Acting
