= Richard E. Carver =

American politician (1937–2023)

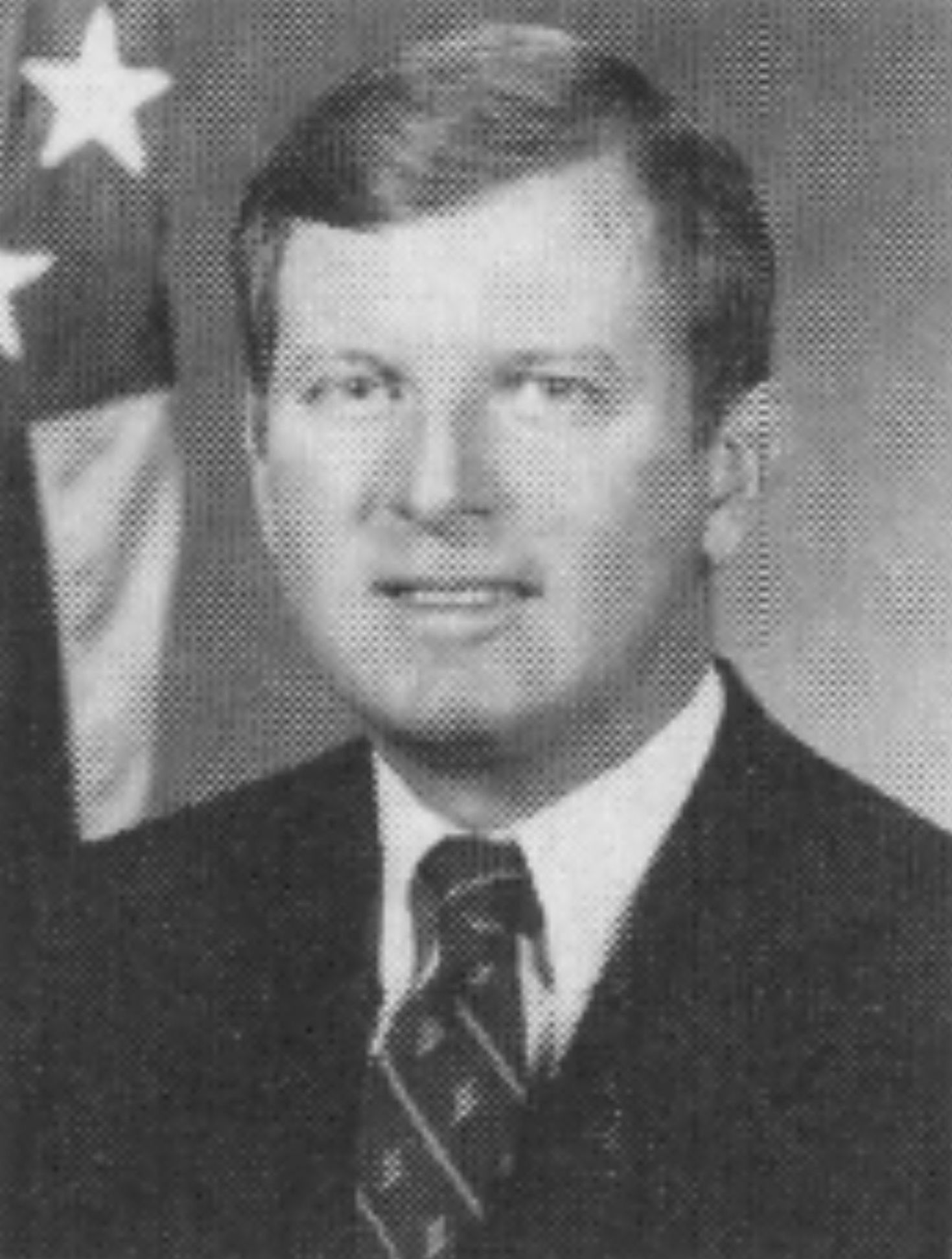
- Carver as Assistant Secretary of the Air Force, 1984

16th Assistant Secretary of the Air Force for Financial Management
- In office 3 October 1984 – 26 March 1987
- President: Ronald Reagan
- Preceded by: Russell D. Hale
- Succeeded by: Michael B. Donley

41st Mayor of Peoria
- In office 1973–1984
- Preceded by: E. Michael O'Brien
- Succeeded by: Charles Neumiller

37th President of the United States Conference of Mayors
- In office 1979–1980
- Preceded by: William H. McNichols Jr.
- Succeeded by: Richard Hatcher

Personal details
- Born: August 28, 1937 Des Moines, Iowa, U.S.
- Died: May 5, 2023 (aged 85) Sarasota, Florida, U.S.
- Party: Republican

Richard Ellison Carver (August 28, 1937 – May 5, 2023) was an American politician who served as Mayor of Peoria, Illinois, from 1973 to 1984 and United States Assistant Secretary of the Air Force (Financial Management & Comptroller) from 1984 to 1988.

== Biography ==
Carver was born in Des Moines, Iowa, on August 28, 1937. He was educated at Bradley University, graduating with a B.S. in business administration in 1959, and was named a distinguished graduate in 1983.

After college, Carver became president of the Carver Lumber Company in Peoria, Illinois. He also served in the Air Force Reserve Command, eventually attaining the rank of colonel.

In 1969, Carver was elected to the Peoria City Council. After four years on City Council, Carver was elected Mayor of Peoria on April 3, 1973. He was re-elected on April 5, 1977. During his second term in office, he served as president of the United States Conference of Mayors 1979–80 and president of the National Conference of Republican Mayors. In 1980, he was a candidate to be United States Senator from Illinois, but lost the Republican primary to Dave O'Neal. He was re-elected to a third term as Mayor of Peoria on April 7, 1981, and subsequently held that office until 1984.

On April 14, 1978, President Jimmy Carter named Carver to a member of the Advisory Commission on Intergovernal Affairs, and on June 17, 1981, President Ronald Reagan named Carver a member of the President's Commission on Housing, a position he held until 1984. On August 11, 1984, President Reagan nominated Carver to be Assistant Secretary of the Air Force (Financial Management & Comptroller). Carver subsequently held this office until 1988.

Upon leaving government service in 1988, Carver became the president of ZF Industries while continuing to own Carver Lumber Company. He became President and CEO of MST America in January 1995. From November 1998 to April 2000, he was President and CEO of RPP America. He was a member of the Board of Directors of Competitive Technologies, Inc. from 2000 to 2007.

Carver Arena, a multi-purpose arena located in the Peoria Civic Center, is named after Carver. The first stages of the convention center were built during his tenure as Mayor.

Carver died on May 5, 2023, at the age of 85.

== See also ==
- List of mayors of Peoria, Illinois

Government offices
Preceded by Russell D. Hale	Assistant Secretary of the Air Force (Financial Management & Comptroller); 1984–1988	Succeeded by Michael B. Donley
