= Shon J. Manasco =

American government official (born 1970)

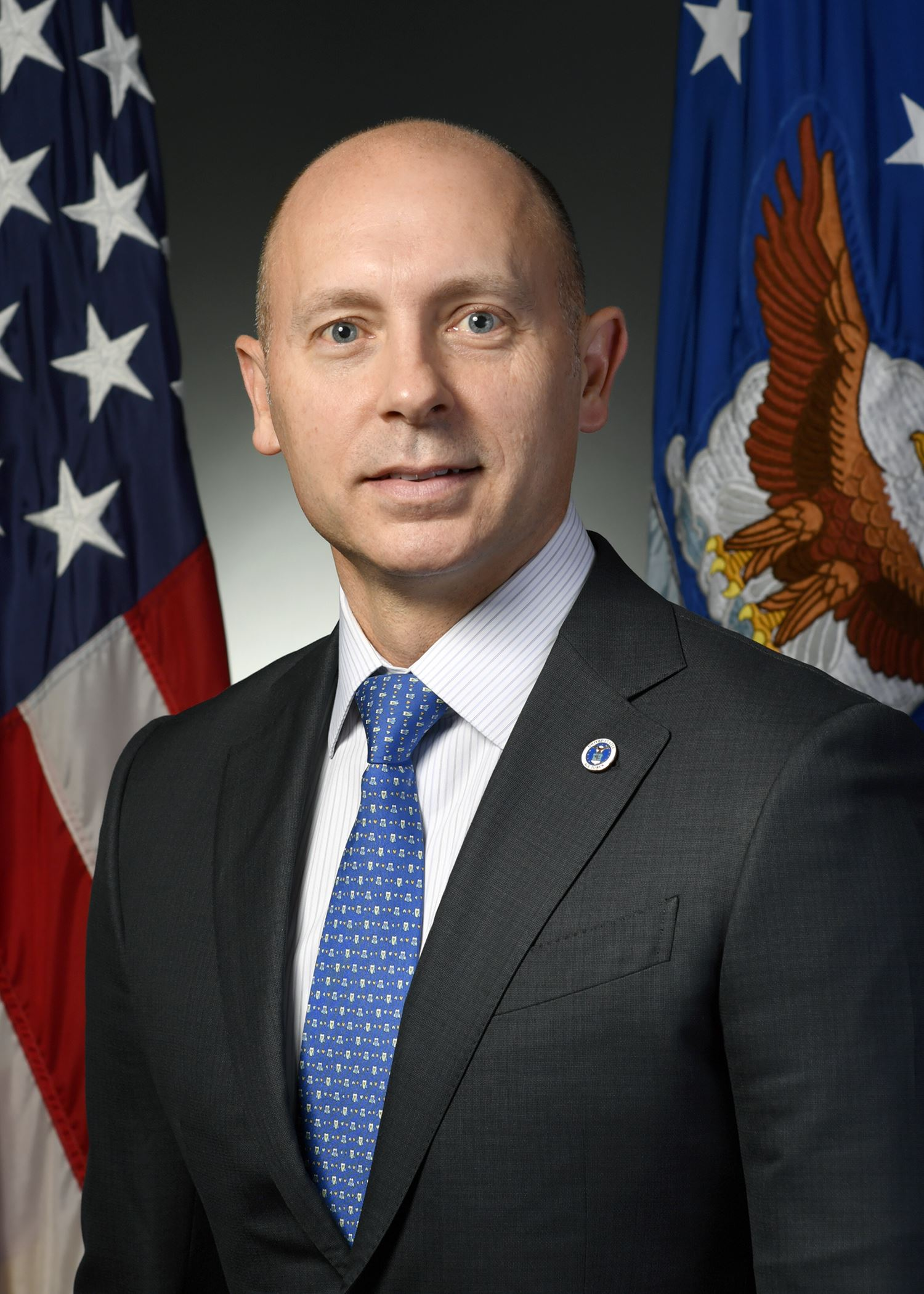

Acting United States Under Secretary of the Air Force
- In office December 27, 2019 – January 20, 2021
- President: Donald Trump
- Preceded by: Matthew Donovan
- Succeeded by: Anthony P. Reardon (acting)

Assistant Secretary of the Air Force (Manpower & Reserve Affairs)
- In office December 4, 2017 – December 27, 2019
- President: Donald Trump
- Preceded by: Gabe Camarillo
- Succeeded by: Alex Wagner

Personal details
- Born: May 17, 1970 (age 55); Norman, Oklahoma, U.S.
- Spouse: Noelle C. Manasco
- Education: United States Military Academy (BS); Southern Methodist University (MBA)

Military service
- Branch/service: United States Army
- Unit: Intelligence Support Activity

Shon J. Manasco (born May 17, 1970) is an American government official and businessman who served as the acting United States Under Secretary of the Air Force from December 27, 2019 to January 20, 2021. In April 2020, it was announced that President Donald Trump planned to ask the Senate to confirm him for this position. On December 30, 2020, the nomination was withdrawn, at his request.

== Education ==
Manasco earned a Bachelor of Science degree in systems engineering and management from the United States Military Academy and a Master of Business Administration from Southern Methodist University.

== Career ==
Manasco served as an officer in the United States Army, commanding at Fort Bragg before becoming director of finance and accounting for the Intelligence Support Activity. While in public service, he held numerous staff and leadership positions supporting worldwide operational activities for Joint Special Operations forces.

After leaving the Army, Manasco spent eleven years as a senior vice president at Bank of America, holding leadership roles in investment and retail banking, asset management and securities. He was then recruited to Baltimore, MD and worked as senior vice president and chief human resource officer for Constellation Energy Group, where he led corporate and shared services function, at the height of the financial crisis.

Manasco later worked as an executive vice president at USAA. During his tenure, Manasco led all sales and services at the company as the Executive Vice President, Member Experience and was the firm's Chief Administrative Officer, where his team was responsible for leading the association's business solutions, information technology and innovation labs, corporate services, enterprise cyber and physical security, procurement and USAA ventures. He was recruited to the company as the Chief Human Resources Officer.

Political offices
Preceded by Matthew Donovan	United States Under Secretary of the Air Force; Acting; 2019–2021	Succeeded by Anthony P. Reardon; Acting
