= Dov S. Zakheim =

United States Department of Defense official

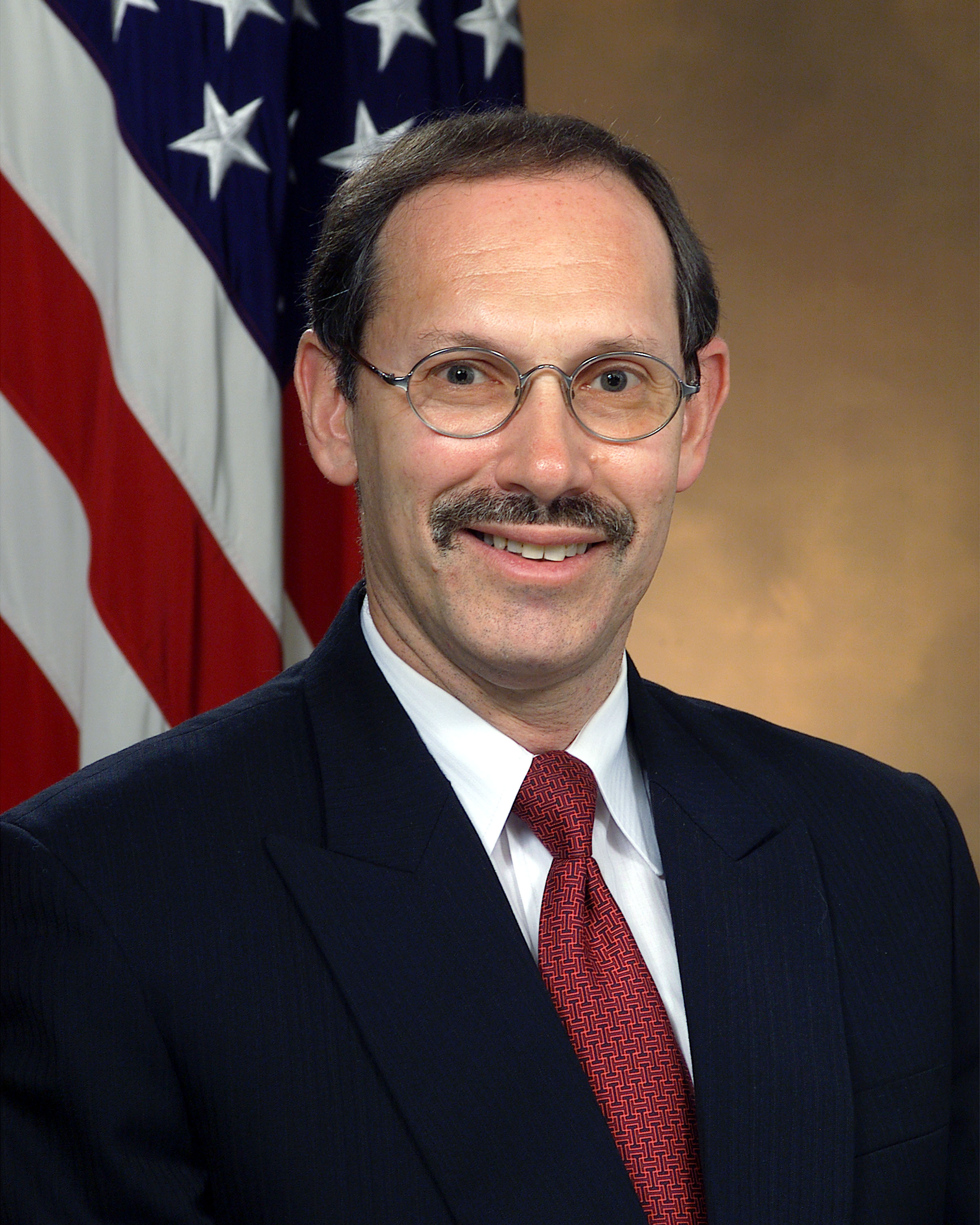
- Zakheim in 2001

3rd Under Secretary of Defense (Comptroller)/CFO
- In office May 3, 2001 – July 15, 2004
- President: George W. Bush
- Preceded by: William J. Lynn
- Succeeded by: Tina W. Jonas

Personal details
- Born: December 18, 1948 (age 77) Brooklyn, New York, U.S.
- Education: Columbia University (BA); St Antony's College, Oxford (PhD)

Dov S. Zakheim (born December 18, 1948) is an American businessman, writer, and former official of the United States government. In the Reagan administration, he held various Department of Defense positions. In 2000, Zakheim was a member of The Vulcans, a group of foreign policy advisors assisting George W. Bush's presidential campaign. From 2001 to 2004, he was Under Secretary of Defense (Comptroller) and Chief Financial Officer of the Department of Defense.

== Early life and education ==
Zakheim was born in Brooklyn and graduated from Yeshiva University High School in Brooklyn, in 1966. He earned his Bachelor of Arts degree Summa Cum Laude in government from Columbia University in 1970 and D.Phil. in economics and politics from the University of Oxford in 1974. He is Jewish. He is an ordained rabbi, having received his ordination from Rabbi Shmuel Walkin.

== Career ==
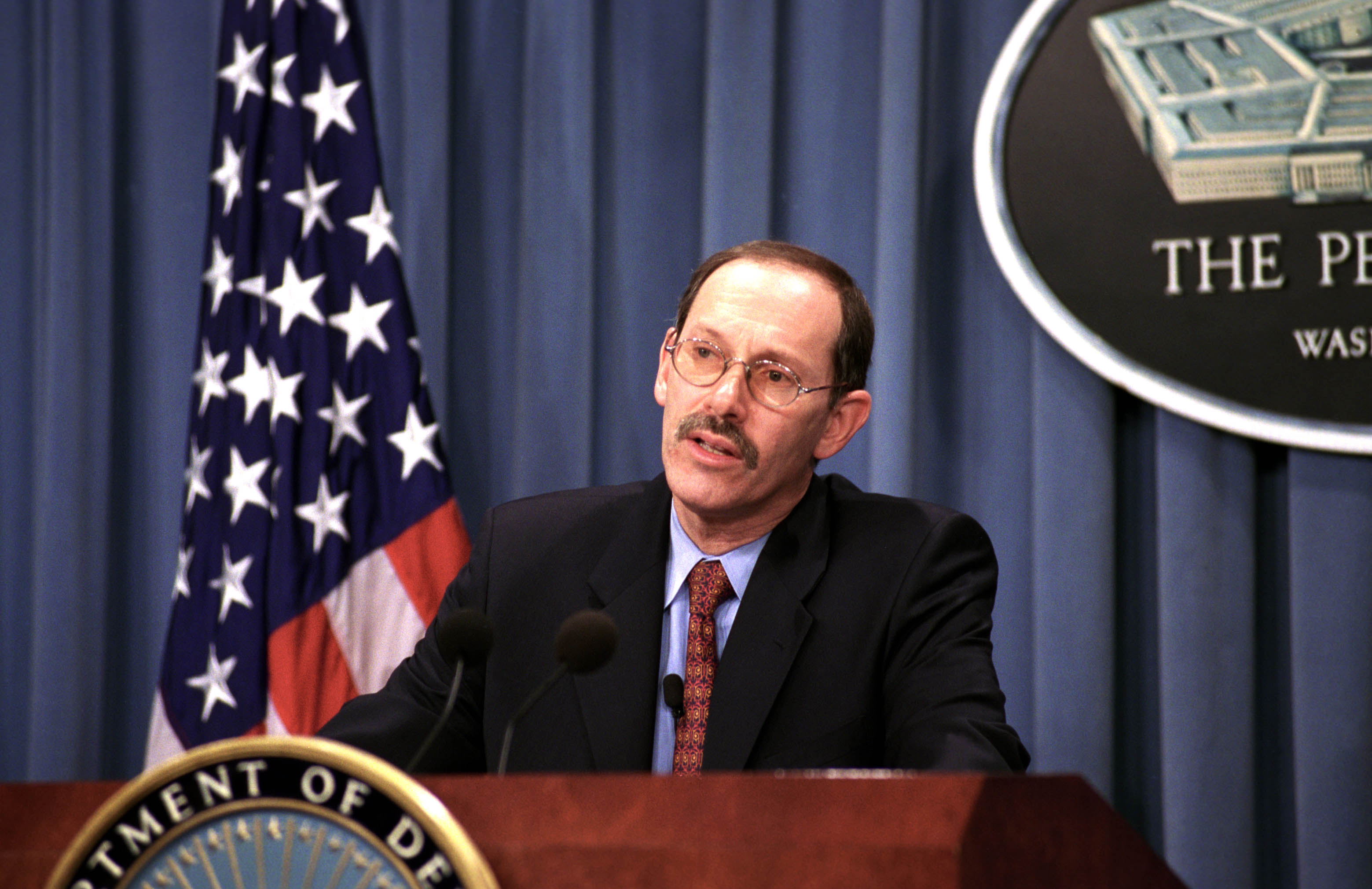
Zakheim in 2003

Zakheim joined the United States Department of Defense in 1981 after serving as a principal analyst in the Congressional Budget Office. He served in various Department of Defense posts during the Reagan administration, including Deputy Undersecretary of Defense for Planning and Resources from 1985 to 1987. There was some controversy in both the U.S. and Israel over Zakheim's involvement in ending the Israeli fighter program, the IAI Lavi. He argued that Israeli and U.S. interests would be best served by having Israel purchase F-16 fighters, rather than investing in an entirely new aircraft. He left government service in 1987 and joined the technology and analysis firm System Planning Corporation as its corporate vice president.

From 1987 to 2001, Zakheim was CEO of SPC International, a subsidiary of System Planning Corporation, a high-technology analytical firm. During that period, he served as a consultant to the Office of the Secretary of Defense, and sat on a number of major Department of Defense panels, including its Task Force on Defense Reform (1997) and the Department of Defense first Board of Visitors of Overseas Regional Centers (1998–2001).

Zakheim was an adjunct professor at the National War College, Yeshiva University, Columbia University, and Trinity College, where he was presidential scholar. Zakheim was an adjunct scholar of The Heritage Foundation, a senior associate at the Center for Strategic and International Studies, and has published over 200 articles and monographs on defense-related issues.

Zakheim signed a letter to Bill Clinton about Iraq.

During the 2000 United States presidential election campaign, Zakheim served as a foreign policy advisor to George W. Bush as part of a group led by Condoleezza Rice that called itself The Vulcans.

=== Bush Administration ===
Zakheim was appointed as Under Secretary of Defense (Comptroller) in May 2001 in George W. Bush administration, and served in the capacity until July 2004. During his term as comptroller, he was tasked to trace the Pentagon's 2.3 trillion dollars' worth of unaccounted transactions. He also played an active role in the department's system acquisition, strategic planning, programming, and budget process. He was succeeded by Tina W. Jonas as the top budget official at the DoD.

In 2008, he was appointed by President Bush as a member of the Commission on Wartime Contracting in Iraq and Afghanistan. He subsequently served as a Commissioner on the Congressionally-mandated Military Compensation and Retirement Modernization Commission. He currently is a Commissioner on the Congressionally-mandated National Security Commission on Emerging Biotechnology, appointed by Senator Jack Reed.

Zakheim retired as a senior vice president of Booz Allen Hamilton in 2010. He is a senior fellow at the CNA Corporation and a senior advisor at the Center for Strategic and International Studies

Zakheim is a member of the Council on Foreign Relations, the International Institute for Strategic Studies, and the United States Naval Institute, and Chatham House. He is a fellow of the Royal Swedish Academy of War Sciences.

Zakheim is a member of the editorial boards of the journal The National Interest and Naval War College Press. He is vice chairman of the board of trustees of the Foreign Policy Research Institute, a trustee of the American University of Iraq, and a member of the Atlantic Council's board of directors, on the Board of the Friends of the Jewish Chapel of the United States Naval Academy and on the Board of Control of the Naval Academy Athletic Association. He publishes a regular column in The Hill.

He is a three-time recipient of the Department of Defense's highest civilian award, the Distinguished Public Service Medal, as well as other awards for government and community service. He is also co-vice chair of Global Panel America with Malcolm Rifkind.

His 2011 book, A Vulcan’s Tale: How the Bush Administration Mismanaged the Reconstruction of Afghanistan, discusses the Bush administration's missed opportunities and struggles to manage two wars, particularly the seemingly endless conflict in Afghanistan.

In the 2020 presidential election, Zakheim, along with over 130 other former Republican national security officials, signed a statement that asserted that President Donald Trump was unfit to serve another term, and "To that end, we are firmly convinced that it is in the best interest of our nation that Vice President Joe Biden be elected as the next President of the United States, and we will vote for him."

== Bibliography ==
=== Books ===
- Zakheim, Dov S. (1996). Flight of the Lavi : inside a U.S.-Israeli crisis. Washington: Brassey's. ISBN 1-57488-065-9. OCLC 34077761.
- Congress and National Security in the Post-Cold War Era (Nixon Center, 1998)
- Toward a Fortress Europe? (Center for Strategic and International Studies, 2000)
- A Vulcan's Tale (Brookings Institution Press, 2011)
- Nehemiah: Statesman and Sage (Koren Publishers, 2016)
