= Ruby Butler DeMesme =

American defense official

Ruby B. DeMesme
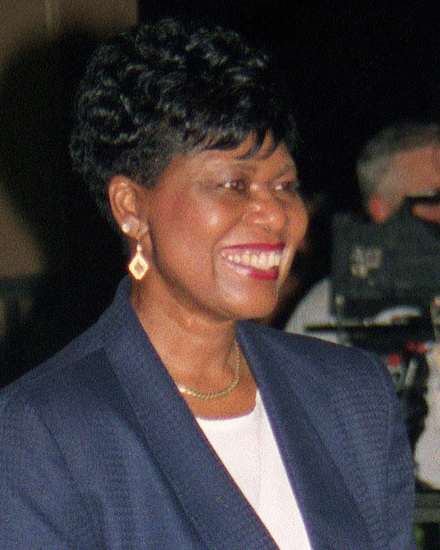

Assistant Secretary of the Air Force for Manpower and Reserve Affairs
- In office August 4, 1998 – January 19, 2001
- President: Bill Clinton
- Preceded by: Rodney A. Coleman
- Succeeded by: Michael L. Dominguez

Personal details
- Born: June 24, 1948
- Died: April 20, 2020 (aged 71)
- Education: St. Augustine's College (BA); University of North Carolina at Chapel Hill (MSW)

Ruby Butler DeMesme (June 24, 1948 – April 20, 2020) was United States Assistant Secretary of the Air Force for Manpower, Reserve Affairs, Installations and Environment from 1998 to 2001.

== Biography ==
Born in Clinton, North Carolina, Ruby B. DeMesme was educated at St. Augustine's College in Raleigh, North Carolina, receiving a B.A. in 1969. She later earned an M.S.W. from the University of North Carolina at Chapel Hill.

From 1969 to 1980, DeMesme worked as an executive administrator in the Cumberland County, North Carolina Department of Social Services. In 1980, she joined the United States Department of the Army and spent the next decade working in a number of positions dealing with personnel. From January 1989 to April 1990, she was a United States Office of Personnel Management Congressional Fellow in the Office of Sen. John Glenn (D–Ohio). She then returned to the Department of the Army.

In 1991, DeMesme moved to the United States Department of the Air Force, becoming Assistant Deputy Assistant Secretary of the Air Force for Health Affairs, and Morale, Welfare, Recreation and Services Program. In February 1993, she became Acting Deputy Assistant Secretary of the Air Force for Force Management and Personnel, being promoted to full Deputy Assistant Secretary of the Air Force for Force Management and Personnel in May 1994.

=== Clinton Administration ===
On July 6, 1998, President of the United States Bill Clinton announced his intent to nominate DeMesme to be Assistant Secretary of the Air Force for Manpower, Reserve Affairs, Installations and Environment. She was the first African American woman to be appointed to this position.

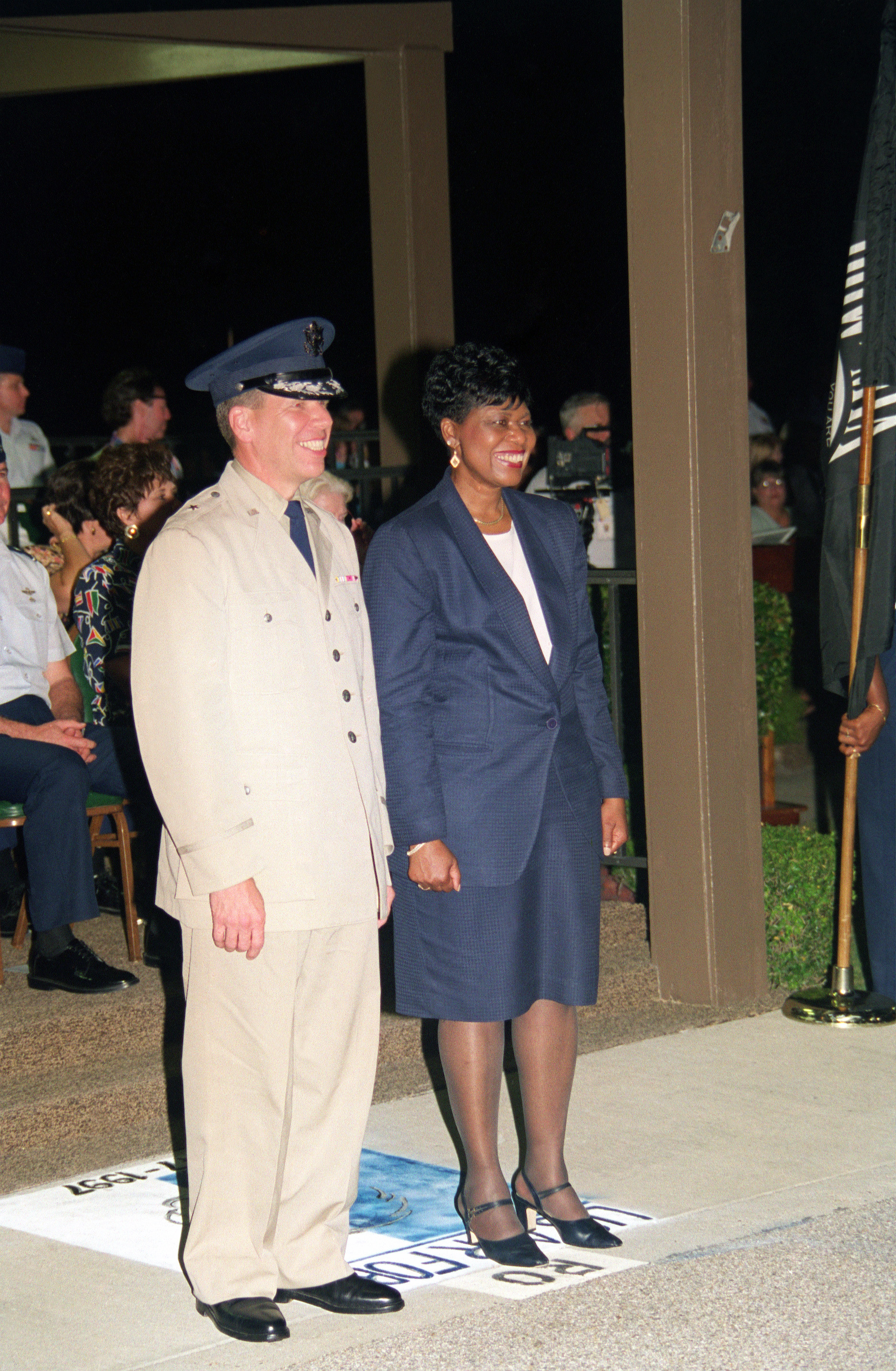
Ruby M. DeMesme, right, and Brigadier General John M. Speigel, left.

DeMesme retired from government service in 2001, joining IBM as Senior Defense Fellow and, later becoming Director of Human Capital Solutions & Defense Practices. In 2005, she joined BearingPoint's Public Services Business Transformation Team. In May 2009, she joined Deloitte as a Senior Executive Advisor/Strategist on Federal Government Human capital Programs and Policies. She is Chairman of the Andrews Federal Credit Union Board, White House Appointee to the Defense Advisory Committee on Women in the Services (DACOWITS); member of the Army Science Board, and the UNC-Chapel Hill School of Social Work. She is a noted author, mentor, and inspirational speaker.

After her 2020 death in Myrtle Beach, South Carolina, DeMesme was interred at Arlington National Cemetery on June 12, 2020.

Government offices
Preceded by Honorable Rodney Coleman	Assistant Secretary of the Air Force (Manpower & Reserve Affairs); 1998 – 2001	Succeeded by Michael L. Dominguez
