= Michael J. McCord =

American government official (born 1959)

Michael McCord
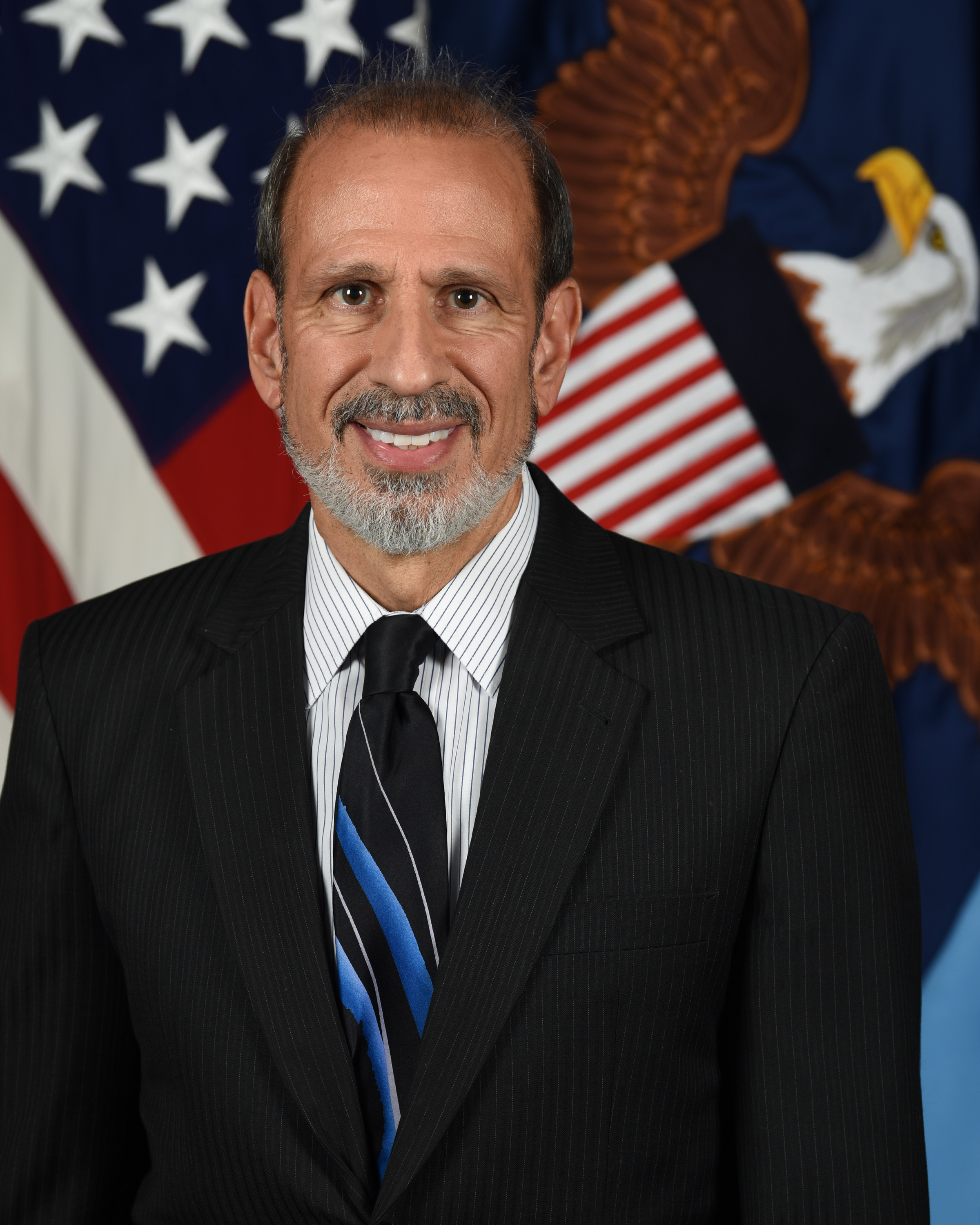
- Official portrait, 2021

6th and 8th Under Secretary of Defense (Comptroller)/CFO
- In office June 3, 2021 – January 20, 2025
- President: Joe Biden
- Preceded by: David Norquist
- Succeeded by: Jules W. Hurst III
- In office June 27, 2014 – January 20, 2017
- President: Barack Obama
- Preceded by: Robert F. Hale
- Succeeded by: David Norquist

Personal details
- Born: January 23, 1959 (age 67) Marion, Ohio
- Education: Ohio State University (BA); University of Pennsylvania (MA)

Michael John McCord (born January 23, 1959) is an American government official who served as Under Secretary of Defense (Comptroller)/CFO from 2014 to 2017 and again from 2021 to 2025. Later in 2017, McCord was elected as a fellow of the National Academy of Public Administration.

== Education ==
McCord was born and raised in Marion, Ohio, graduating from River Valley High School in 1977. He earned a Bachelor of Arts degree in economics from the Ohio State University in 1981 and a Master of Arts in public policy analysis from the University of Pennsylvania in 1984.

== Career ==
During his career, McCord worked in the staff of the Senate Committee on Armed Services, House Committee on the Budget, and Congressional Budget Office. During the Obama administration, McCord served in the United States Department of Defense as principal deputy under secretary of defense (comptroller) from 2009, and the Senate confirmed him as Under Secretary of Defense (Comptroller) in June 2014, a post he held until the end of the administration in January 2017. After leaving office, he became the director of civil-military programs at the Stennis Center for Public Service and a trustee of the Aerospace Corporation.

President Biden nominated McCord to serve again as Comptroller in April 2021, and his nomination was confirmed by unanimous consent on May 28, 2021. McCord had served on Biden's transition team at the department, and at his confirmation hearing he said he would try to speed up the department's financial audit.

On September 30, 2023, after the House passed a stopgap funding bill without aid for Ukraine, McCord wrote to congressional leaders that the department had exhausted the Ukraine Security Assistance Initiative, had only $1.6 billion left of the $25.9 billion provided to replenish American stocks drawn down for Ukraine, and had already slowed the replenishment of its own forces.
