= Michael Montelongo =

American politician

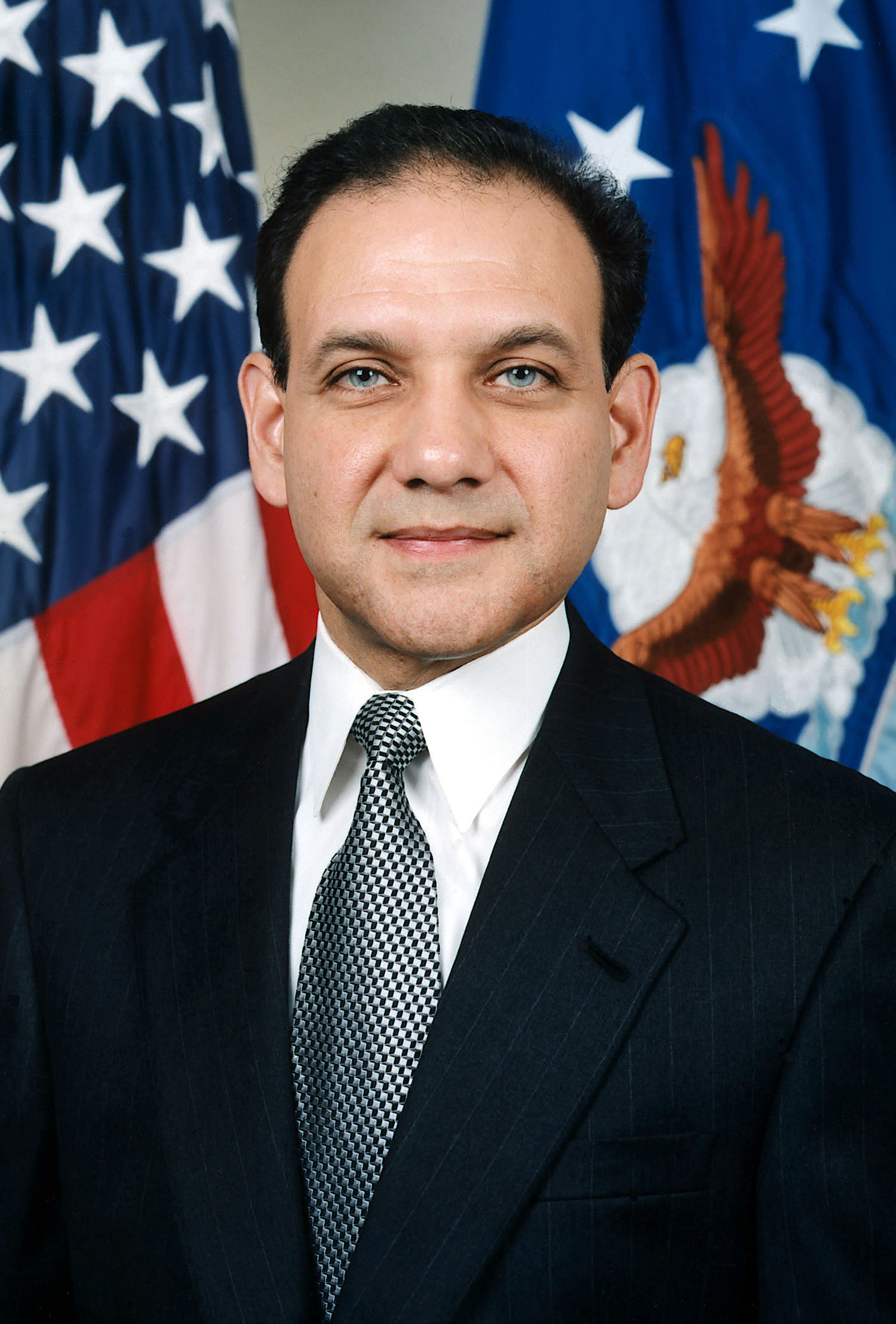
- Official portrait, 2001

United States Secretary of the Air Force
- Acting
- In office March 25, 2005 – March 28, 2005
- President: George W. Bush
- Preceded by: Peter B. Teets
- Succeeded by: Michael L. Dominguez

United States Assistant Secretary of the Air Force for Financial Management
- In office August 6, 2001 – March 24, 2005
- President: George W. Bush
- Preceded by: Robert F. Hale
- Succeeded by: John H. Gibson

Personal details
- Born: Miguel Joseph Montelongo; August 20, 1955 (age 70) New York City, New York, U.S.
- Party: Republican
- Education: United States Military Academy (BS); Harvard University (MBA)

Military service
- Branch/service: United States Army
- Years of service: 1977–1996

Michael Joseph Montelongo (born Miguel Montelongo on August 20, 1955 in Manhattan) served as the acting secretary of the Air Force in 2005. A member of the Republican Party, he served as the Assistant Secretary of the Air Force for Financial Management from 2001 to 2005.

== Brief Biography ==
Hon. Michael Montelongo was Assistant Secretary of the Air Force for Financial Management and Comptroller, Headquarters U.S. Air Force, Washington, D.C. He is also the principal adviser to the Secretary of the Air Force, Chief of Staff, and other senior Air Force officials for budgetary and fiscal matters. With a budget of more than $124 billion, he serves as the Air Force's Chief Financial Officer responsible for providing the financial management and analytical services necessary for the effective and efficient use of Air Force resources. He was sworn on August 6, 2001, as the 18th Assistant Secretary, and is the senior Hispanic official in the Air Force.

Mr. Montelongo entered public service in 1977 as a lieutenant in the U.S. Army, and completed the U.S. Army Ranger School at Fort Benning, Georgia in 1978. He then served in line and staff positions from platoon to Department of the Army levels at varied U.S. and overseas posts. An Air Defense Artillery Officer, he was Special Assistant to the Commander in Chief of United States Southern Command, Speechwriter and Special Assistant to the Army Chief of Staff, and a congressional fellow in the U.S. Senate. In 1996, he retired from the Army and entered private industry with BellSouth Telecommunications, and later became a Sales Executive and Consultant with Capgemini.

Mr. Montelongo has been active in several civic pursuits. These include serving as Vice President of Community Services for the Harvard Business School Club of Atlanta, on the board of directors for the Georgia Voter Hispanic Registration Campaign, and directing youth and young adult ministries for the Atlanta archdiocese. A New York City native from Puerto Rican descent, Mr. Montelongo is listed in Hispanic Business Magazine's "100 Most Influential Hispanics", in Hispanic Engineer Magazine's "50 Most Important Hispanics in Technology and Business," and in Hispanic Executive magazine's 2017 Best of the Boardroom. In 2016, Mr. Montelongo was recognized by the Alumni Society in the organization's Class of 2016.

== Education ==
- 1973 Xavier High School, Manhattan, New York City, N.Y.
- 1977 Bachelor of Science degree in general engineering, U.S. Military Academy, West Point, N.Y.
- 1988 Master of Business Administration degree, Harvard Business School, Boston, Mass.
- 1992 U.S. Army Command and General Staff College, Fort Leavenworth, Kan.

== Career Chronology ==
- 1977–1986, line and staff positions, U.S. and overseas posts
- 1988–1991, Senior Analyst and assistant professor, U.S. Military Academy, West Point, N.Y.
- 1992–1994, Battalion Operations and Executive Officer, and Brigade Operations Officer, Fort Bliss, Texas
- 1994–1995, Special Assistant to the Army Chief of Staff, the Pentagon, Washington, D.C.
- 1995–1996, congressional fellow, 104th Congress, Washington, D.C.
- 1996–1998, Director, Small Business Services, BellSouth Telecommunications Inc., Atlanta, Ga.
- 1999–2001, Sales Executive and Consultant, Capgemini, Atlanta, Ga.
- 2001–2005, Assistant Secretary of the Air Force for Financial Management and Comptroller, Headquarters U.S. Air Force, Washington, D.C.

== Professional Memberships and Associations ==
- American Society of Military Comptrollers
- Minority Outreach Committee, Association of West Point Graduates
- National Society of Hispanic MBAs

== See also ==
- List of Puerto Ricans

Government offices
Preceded by Robert F. Hale	United States Assistant Secretary of the Air Force for Financial Management; 2001–2005	Succeeded by John H. Gibson
Preceded by Peter B. Teets	United States Secretary of the Air Force; Acting; 2005	Succeeded by Michael L. Dominguez
