= The Vulcans =

George W. Bush's foreign policy advisory team for the 2000 U.S. election

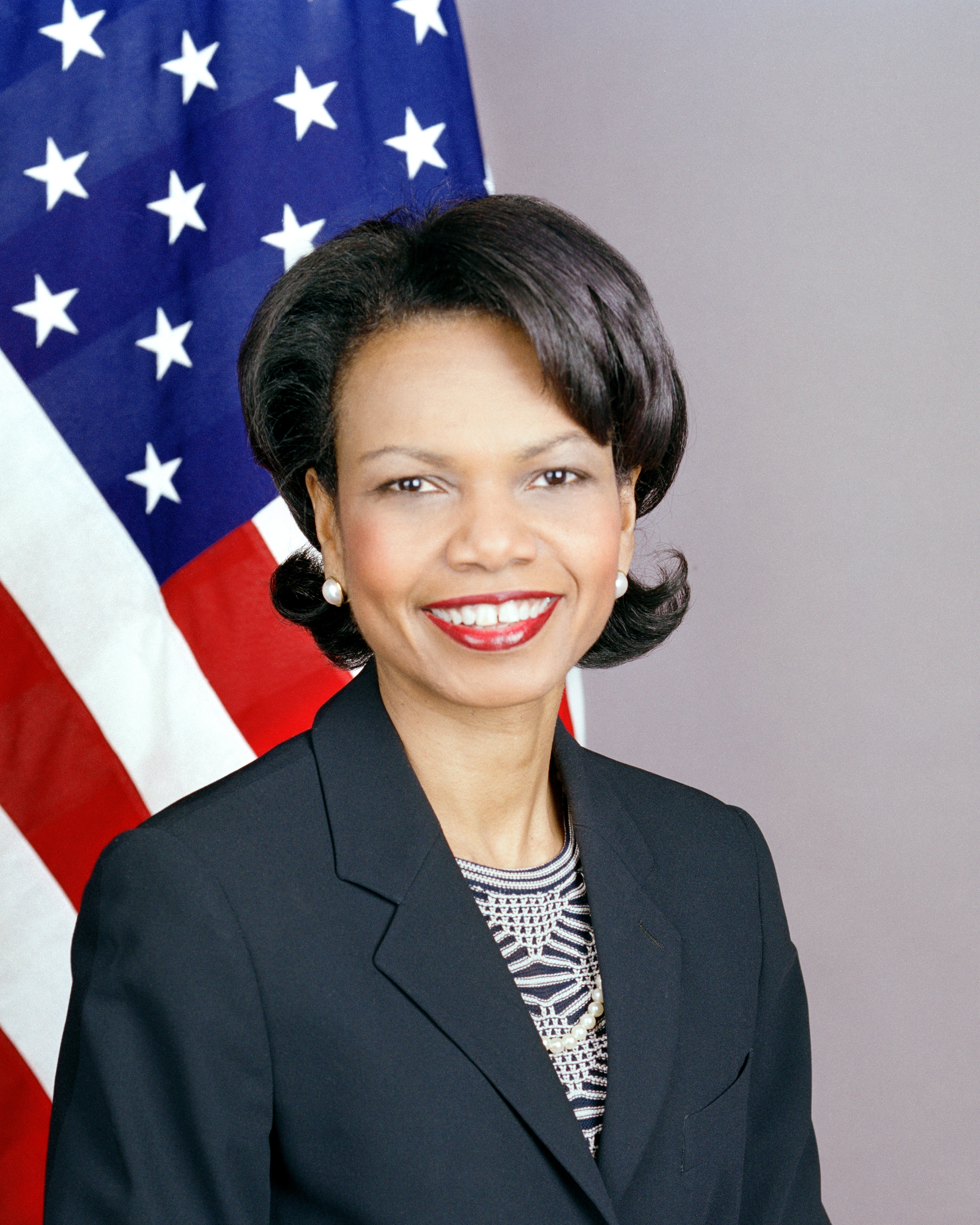
A leading member of the group, Condoleezza Rice went on to serve as National Security Advisor (2001–2005) and as Secretary of State (2005–2009)

The Vulcans is a nickname used to refer to Republican presidential candidate George W. Bush's foreign policy advisory team assembled to brief him prior to the 2000 US presidential election.

The Vulcans were led by Condoleezza Rice, a former member of the U.S. National Security Council. The group's ranks included Richard Armitage, Robert Blackwill, Stephen Hadley, Richard Perle, Dov S. Zakheim, Robert Zoellick, Paul Wolfowitz, and Wolfowitz protégé, Scooter Libby.

After the election, all the members of the team received key positions within the new Bush administration. Other key campaign figures including Dick Cheney, George P. Shultz and Colin Powell were also closely associated with the group, but were never actually members.

The name "The Vulcans" alludes to a huge statue of Vulcan, the Roman god of fire and metalworking, in Rice's home town of Birmingham, Alabama. It may also allude to fictional, humanlike, alien beings who suppress their emotions in favor of cold rational logic in Star Trek. The most famous of those Vulcans is Spock, played by Leonard Nimoy.

== Origin ==
During the summer of 1998, George W. Bush met with Condoleezza Rice at the behest of George H. W. Bush at the Bush estate in Kennebunkport, Maine. Rice had been director for Soviet and East European Affairs of the National Security Council under Brent Scowcroft during George H. W. Bush's administration and Scowcroft had been guiding her career ever since, ensuring she came to the attention of Bush Sr. "Eventually he was quite taken with her", Scowcroft recalled in an interview by James Mann for his book Rise of the Vulcans (2004).

According to Coit D. Blacker, Rice and George W. Bush also "bonded at Kennebunkport" in August 1998. The several days of discussions that followed resulted in Rice agreeing to take charge of foreign policy for George W. Bush's upcoming presidential campaign. Later that year, Paul Wolfowitz, a former protégé of George Shultz and Dick Cheney, was taken on as well. Wolfowitz had also served as foreign policy advisor to Bob Dole during the 1996 US presidential election.

In early 1999, a team largely drawn from the middle echelons of the first Bush administration began to act as foreign policy advisors to George W. Bush:

- Richard Armitage, former Assistant Secretary of Defense for International Security Affairs.
- Robert Blackwill, former member of the United States National Security Council.
- Stephen Hadley, former Assistant Secretary of Defense for Global Strategic Affairs.
- Scooter Libby, former Deputy Under Secretary of Defense for Policy.
- Richard Perle, former Assistant Secretary of Defense for Global Strategic Affairs.
- Condoleezza Rice, former member of the United States National Security Council.
- Paul Wolfowitz, former Under Secretary of Defense for Policy.
- Dov Zakheim, former Deputy Under Secretary of Defense for Strategy, Plans, & Forces.
- Robert Zoellick, former Counselor of the United States Department of State.

In early 1999, the Vulcans held their first meeting in Austin, Texas, which was attended by Cheney and Shultz. The group communicated regularly afterward.

During 1999 and 2000, a second group was formed under the leadership of Donald Rumsfeld to deal specifically with the subject of missile defense. While distinct from the Vulcans, it did include Rice, Wolfowitz, Hadley and Perle alongside Shultz and various academics and scientists, including Martin Anderson of Stanford University and Lowell Wood of Lawrence Livermore National Laboratory.

== Campaign ==
George W. Bush laid out his foreign policy plans on October 11, 2000, at the second Gore-Bush presidential debate against his Democratic rival Vice President Al Gore.

If we're an arrogant nation, they'll resent us. If we're a humble nation, but strong, they'll welcome us. Our nation stands alone right now in the world in terms of power, and that's why we have to be humble, and yet project strength in a way that promotes freedom.

"The vice president and I have a disagreement about the use of troops", Bush announced. "He believes in nation building. I would be very careful about using troops as nation builders", he clarified, expressing particular concerns about the Clinton Administration's recent involvement in Somalia and Haiti, by telling Gore:

I'm not so sure the role of the United States is to go around the world and say this is the way it's got to be. We can help. And maybe it's just our difference in government, the way we view government. I want to empower the people. I want to help people help themselves, not have government tell people what to do. I just don't think it's the role of the United States to walk into a country and say, we do it this way, so should you.

"I believe the role of the military is to fight and win war", Bush went on to explain, "I don't want to try to put our troops in all places at all times. I don't want to be the world's policeman."

During the campaign, Bush promised to increase the defense budget, stating that "America's armed forces need better equipment, better training and better pay." However, Bush did not promise as much of an increase as Gore, even going as far as to state "If this is a race to see who can spend the most money, I'm going to lose." Analyst William D. Hartung of the World Policy Institute points out that Gore promised $100 billion over 10 years while Bush promised $50 billion over the same period. However, according to Hartung, "the $50 billion referred to specific projects", and "[i]t could not possibly have referred to their entire proposed increase".

Bush, at the advice of Hadley, also proposed greater nuclear arms reductions than Gore. Hadley's plan proposed unilaterally reducing the number of proposed long-range nuclear missiles to around 1,500–2,000 from the then 6,500–7,500, but caveats to this included the abandonment of attempts to get the Senate to ratify the 1996 Comprehensive Test Ban Treaty and the development of new low-yield bunker-busting mini-nukes for actual battle-field use. Hartung feared that these steps would "re-start the nuclear arms race" as the US arsenal was upgraded.

At the advice of Rumsfeld's missile defense group, Bush committed himself to building a strong National Missile Defense (NMD). Stating that "[n]ow is not the time to defend outdated treaties but to defend the American people", he made it clear that he was willing to abandon the 1972 Anti-Ballistic Missile Treaty in order to do this. A member of the group had told The Washington Post that "All of us to a greater or lesser extent were uncomfortable with the treaty, but Bush said 'My concern isn't the treaty. My concern is missile defense, and I don't want anything to stand in the way of it.'"

Bush's plans for NMD went far beyond the limited options endorsed by the Clinton Administration. As Hartung points out, "Bush's advisers suggested that if elected, would not limit the system to land-based options, but would move full speed ahead to develop interceptors based at sea, lasers based on aircraft and perhaps lasers or rockets based in space as well." Hartung estimated that this would cost a minimum of $100–200 billion, far in excess of Bush's promised defense budget increase.

== Legacy ==
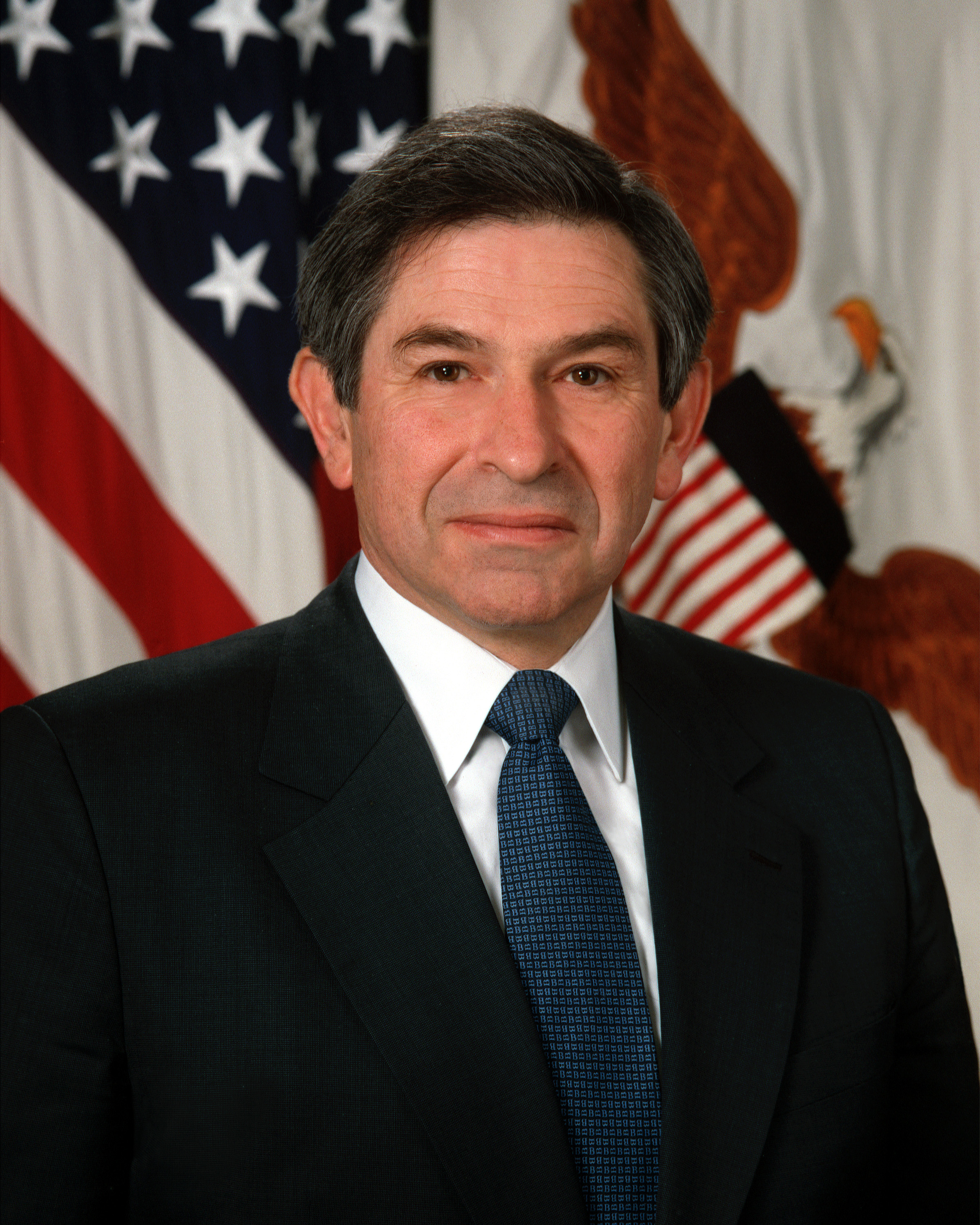
Paul Wolfowitz: Vulcan and Bush's Deputy Secretary of Defense

Following the election of George W. Bush as President of the United States, the Vulcans all received key positions within the new administration.

- Richard Armitage was appointed US Deputy Secretary of State under Colin Powell.
- Robert Blackwill was appointed US Ambassador to India and later to the US National Security Council.
- Stephen Hadley was appointed US Deputy National Security Advisor under Rice and later US National Security Advisor.
- Scooter Libby became Chief of Staff to the Vice President of the United States.
- Richard Perle was appointed chairman of the US Defense Policy Board Advisory Committee.
- Condoleezza Rice was appointed US National Security Advisor and later US Secretary of State in Bush's Second Administration.
- Paul Wolfowitz was appointed US Deputy Secretary of Defense under Donald Rumsfeld and later president of the World Bank in 2005.
- Dov Zakheim was appointed Under Secretary of Defense (Comptroller).
- Robert Zoellick was appointed US Trade Representative, US Deputy Secretary of State and nominated as World Bank president in 2007.

On December 13, 2001, in accordance with his campaign promises on National Missile Defense, Bush gave Russia six months' notice of the United States' withdrawal from the 1972 Anti-Ballistic Missile Treaty. This was the first time in recent history the United States had withdrawn from a major international arms treaty. However, the humble foreign policy outlined by Bush during his campaign was quickly dropped after the terrorist attacks of 9/11 in favor of a more aggressive policy that has been dubbed the Bush Doctrine.
