= Michael L. Dominguez =

American government official (born 1953)

Michael Dominguez
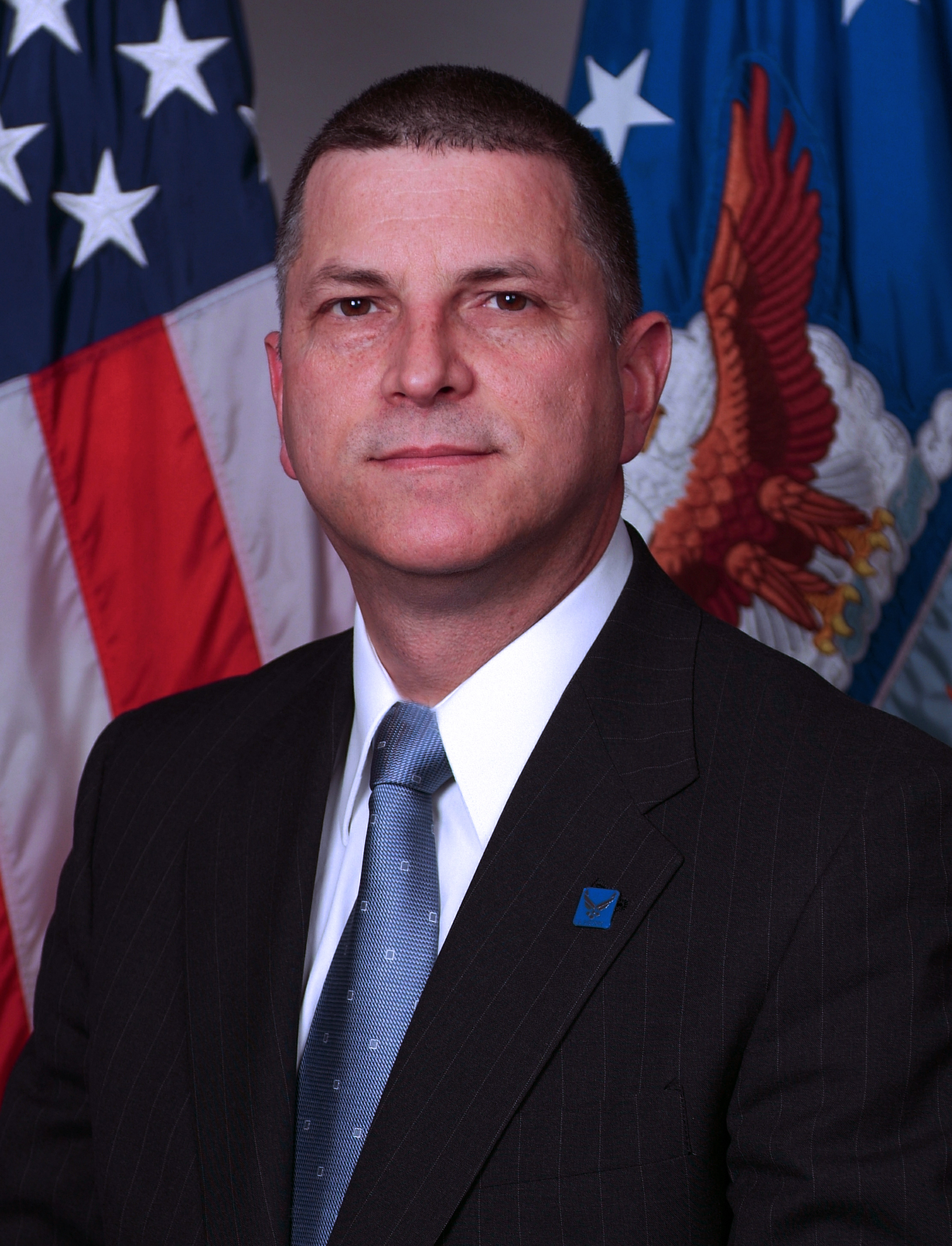
- Official portrait, 2005

United States Secretary of the Air Force
- Acting
- In office March 28, 2005 – July 29, 2005
- President: George W. Bush
- Preceded by: Michael Montelongo (acting)
- Succeeded by: Pete Geren (acting)

United States Assistant Secretary of the Air Force for Manpower and Reserve Affairs
- In office August 3, 2001 – July 11, 2006
- President: George W. Bush
- Preceded by: Ruby DeMesme
- Succeeded by: Craig W. Duehring

Personal details
- Born: Michael Luis Dominguez; September 4, 1953 (age 72) Austin, Texas, U.S.
- Education: United States Military Academy (BS); Stanford University (MBA); Harvard University (MA)

Michael Luis Dominguez (born September 4, 1953 in Austin, Texas) served as the acting United States Secretary of the Air Force in 2005. He also served as the United States Assistant Secretary of the Air Force for Manpower and Reserve Affairs from 2001 to 2006.

Dominguez reported to the Under Secretary of Defense for Personnel and Readiness, and was responsible for "providing staff advice to the Secretary of Defense and Deputy Secretary of Defense for total force management as it relates to manpower; force structure; readiness; reserve component affairs; health affairs; training; and personnel policy and management, including equal opportunity, morale, welfare, recreation, and quality of life matters."

== Career ==
The child of an Air Force servicemember, Dominguez grew up on bases around the world. After graduating in 1975 from the United States Military Academy at West Point, he was commissioned a Second Lieutenant in the United States Army, reported to Vicenza (Italy), then worked varied assignments with the 1st Battalion, 509th Infantry (Airborne) and the Southern European Task Force.

After leaving the military in 1980, Dominguez went into private business and attended the Stanford Graduate School of Business. From June 1983 to September 1988, he worked at the Office of the Secretary of Defense as an analyst for the Program Analysis and Evaluation (PA&E) office.

From October 1988 to September 1991, he was executive assistant to the Assistant Secretary of Defense for PA&E.

Dominguez entered the Senior Executive Service in 1991 as PA&E's Director for Planning and Analytical Support, serving until September 1994. He oversaw DOD's long-range planning forecast and its $12 billion in annual spending on information technology. He also directed the PA&E modernization of computing, communications and modeling infrastructure. He joined the Chief of Naval Operations' staff in October 1994 and helped the U.S. Navy develop multi-year programs and annual budgets. Dominguez left government in April 1997 to become general manager for a technology service organization, Tech 2000 in Herndon, Virginia.

In September 1999, he began work at the Center for Naval Analyses, where he organized and directed studies of public policy and program issues. In January 2001, he rejoined the staff of the Chief of Naval Operations as assistant director for Space, Information Warfare, and Command and Control.

From August 2001 until July 2006, Dominguez served as the Assistant Secretary of the Air Force for Manpower and Reserve Affairs. That service was interrupted by several months when he served as the acting United States Secretary of the Air Force from March 28 to July 29, 2005.

== Education ==
- 1975 Bachelor of Science, U.S. Military Academy, West Point
- 1983 Master of Business Administration, Stanford University
- 1989 Program for Senior Officials in National Security, Harvard University
- 1990 Master of Arts, John F. Kennedy School of Government, Harvard University

== Awards ==
- 1980 Army Commendation Medal
- 1988 and 1994 Defense Meritorious Civilian Service Medal
- 1993 Defense Civilian Service Medal
- 1997 Medal for Superior Civilian Service, Department of the Navy
- 1998 Presidential Meritorious Executive Rank Award
- 2005 (twice) and 2006 Air Force Exceptional Civilian Service Medal
- 2006 Hispanic Engineer National Achievement Awards Conference (HENAAC) Role Model of the Year Award
- 2010 elected as Fellow of the National Academy of Public Administration.

Government offices
Preceded by Ruby DeMesme	United States Assistant Secretary of the Air Force for Manpower and Reserve Affairs; 2001–2006	Succeeded by Craig W. Duehring
Preceded by Michael Montelongo; Acting	United States Secretary of the Air Force; Acting; 2005	Succeeded by Pete Geren; Acting
