= James G. Roche =

American politician (1939–2026)

James Roche
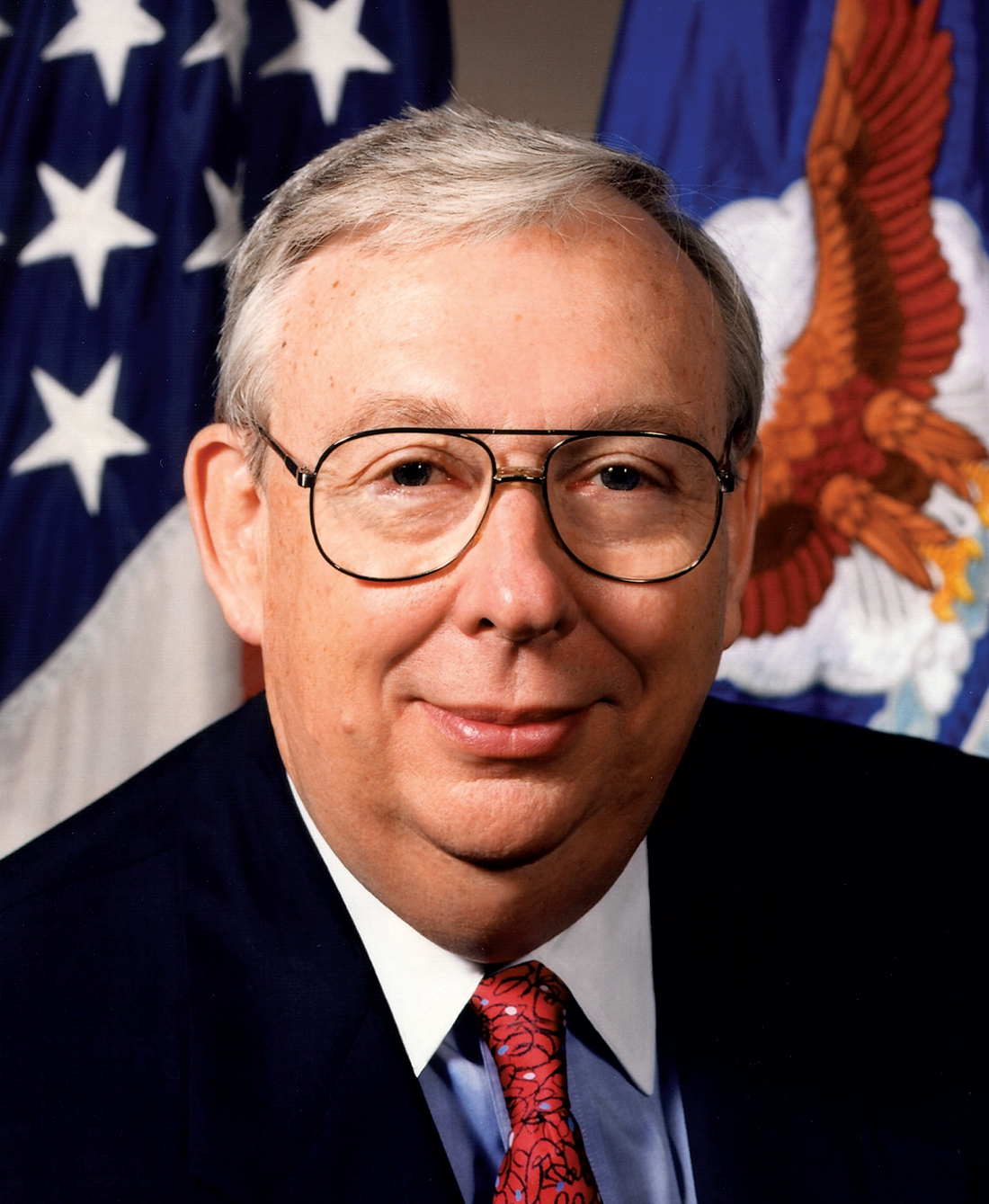

20th United States Secretary of the Air Force
- In office June 1, 2001 – January 20, 2005
- President: George W. Bush
- Preceded by: F. Whitten Peters
- Succeeded by: Michael Wynne

Personal details
- Born: James Gerard Roche; December 16, 1939 New York City, U.S.
- Died: August 4, 2026 (aged 86) Annapolis, Maryland, U.S.
- Party: Democratic
- Spouse: Diane L. Mikula (m. 1960; died 2026)
- Children: 1
- Education: Illinois Institute of Technology (BA); Naval Postgraduate School (MS); Harvard University (DBA)

Military service
- Allegiance: United States
- Branch: United States Navy
- Service years: 1960–1983
- Rank: Captain

James Gerard Roche (December 16, 1939 – August 4, 2026) was an American politician. He served as the 20th Secretary of the Air Force, serving from January 20, 2001 to January 20, 2005. Prior to serving as secretary, Roche served in the United States Navy for 23 years, and as an executive with Northrop Grumman.

== Background ==
Roche was born in Brooklyn, New York, on December 16, 1939. He served for 23 years in the United States Navy before retiring with the rank of Captain in 1983. As a naval officer, his assignments included Principal Deputy Director of the State Department's Policy Planning Staff; Senior Professional Staff Member of the Senate Select Committee on Intelligence; and assistant director for the Defense Department's Office of Net Assessment. He commanded USS Buchanan, a guided missile destroyer, and was awarded the Arleigh Burke Fleet Trophy for the Navy's most improved combat unit in the Pacific in 1974.

Prior to this appointment, Secretary Roche held several executive positions with Northrop Grumman Corp., including corporate vice president and president, Electronic Sensors and Systems Sector. Prior to joining Northrop Grumman in 1984, he was Democratic Staff Director of the U.S. Senate Armed Services Committee.

== Secretary of the Air Force ==
Roche served as a member of the Secretary of Defense's Policy Board and was a member of the Council of Foreign Relations and the International Institute of Strategic Studies. Roche was awarded various campaign ribbons and military medals.

== Ethics investigation ==
In 2003, during the Air Force's deliberations concerning the replacement of KC-135 aircraft, Robin Cleveland, Associate Director of National Security Programs, OMB, emailed Roche asking his assistance in gaining employment with Northrop Grumman Corporation (for which he had once been a senior executive) after she left her position with the government. Roche did so and replied to Cleveland telling her so. This was a DoD ethics violation. The investigation found that Roche had misused his office for private gain and used government communications to do so, but made no recommendations for action.

Secretary of Defense Donald Rumsfeld saw no reason to pursue the matter.

Roche was also cited for ethics violations regarding the Air Force's decision to lease KC-767 tanker aircraft.

== Personal life and death ==
Roche was married to Diane L. Mikula, from May 1960 until her death in January 2026. They had one daughter, Heather Roche.

Roche died at his home in Annapolis, Maryland, on August 4, 2026, from vascular disease at the age of 86.

== Education ==
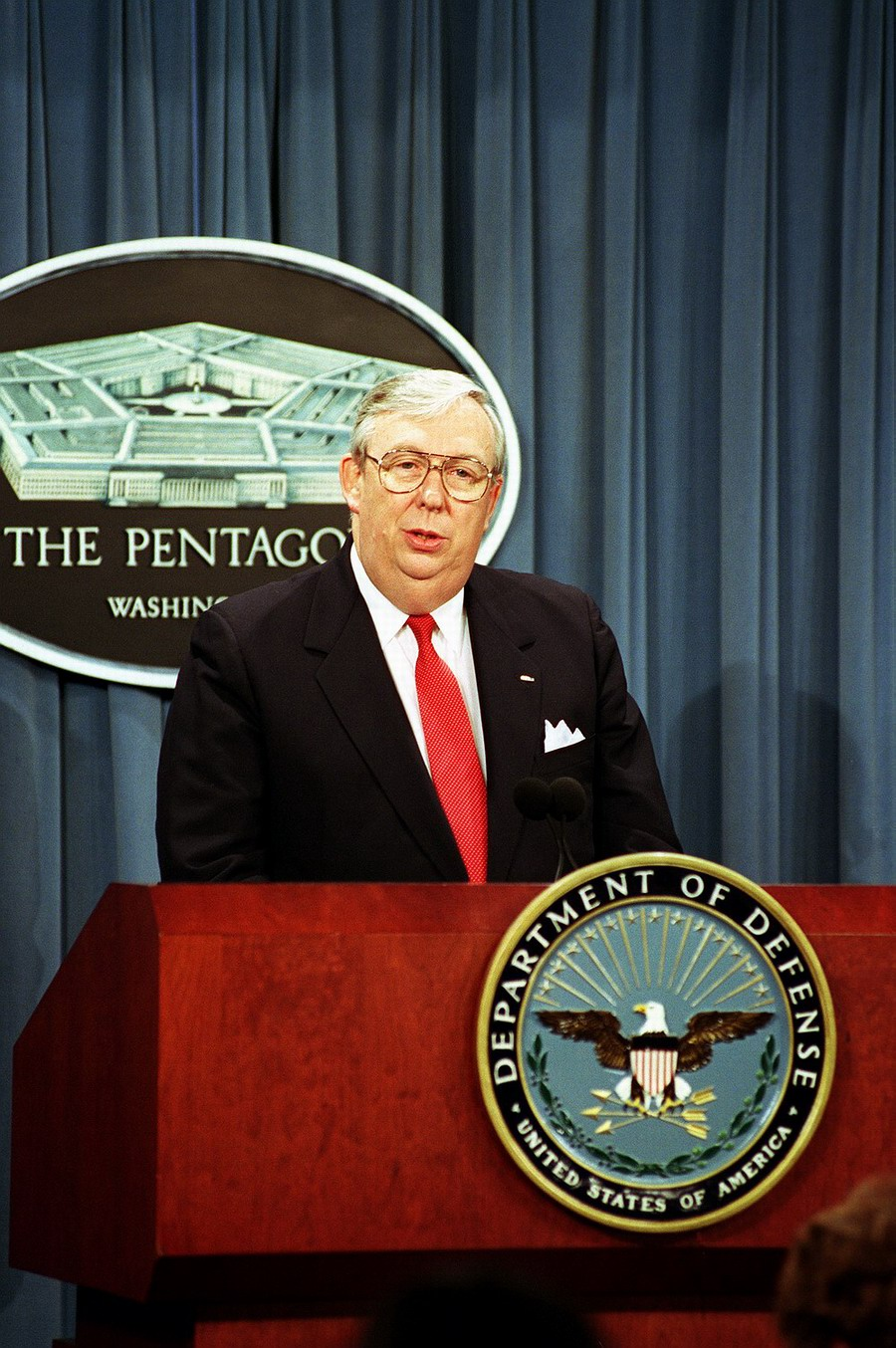
Roche at a Pentagon briefing

- 1960 Bachelor of Science degree in language, literature and philosophy, Illinois Institute of Technology, Chicago
- 1966 Master of Science degree with distinction in operations research, U.S. Naval Postgraduate School, Monterey, California
- 1972 Doctorate degree in business administration, Harvard Graduate School of Business Administration, Cambridge, Massachusetts
- 2002 Honorary Doctorate, Illinois Institute of Technology
- 2003 Honorary Doctorate, St. Thomas Aquinas College, Sparkill, New York

== Career chronology ==
- 1960–1983, commissioned United States Navy officer, retiring with the rank of captain
- 1983–1984, Democratic Staff Director, Senate Armed Services Committee, Washington, D.C.
- 1984–1989, vice president and director, Analysis Center, Northrop Grumman Corp., Washington, D.C.
- 1989–1991, vice president and special assistant to the chairman, president and chief executive officer, Northrop Grumman Corp., Los Angeles, California
- 1991–1992, vice president of Advanced Development and Planning, Northrop Grumman Corp., Los Angeles, California
- 1992–1996, Chief Advanced Development, Planning, and Public Affairs Officer, Northrop Grumman Corp., Los Angeles, California
- 1996–2001, corporate vice president and president, Electronic Sensors & Systems Sector, Northrop Grumman Corp., Baltimore, Maryland
- 2001–2005, Secretary of the Air Force, Washington, D.C.

== Awards and honors ==
- Defense Superior Service Medal
- Legion of Merit
- Navy Commendation Medal
- Navy Expeditionary Medal
- National Defense Service Medal
- Vietnam Service Medal
- United States Navy Distinguished Public Service Medal
- 2003 Department of the Army Distinguished Civilian Service Award
- 2003 Illinois Institute of Technology Professional Achievement Award
- 2003 U.S. Air Force Order of the Sword

Government offices
Preceded by F. Whitten Peters	United States Secretary of the Air Force; 2001–2005	Succeeded by Peter B. Teets; Acting
