= Tina W. Jonas =

American undersecretary of defense

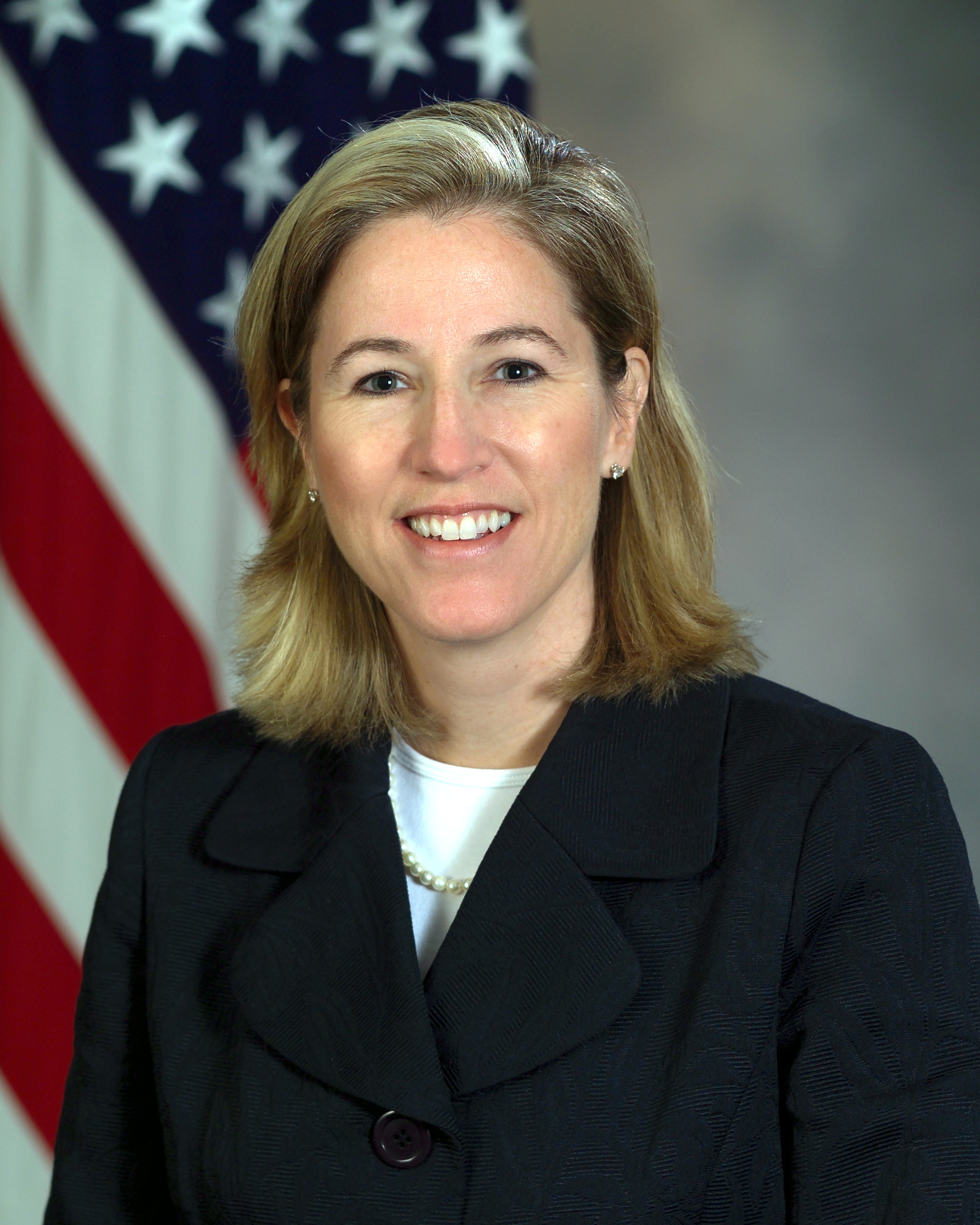

4th Under Secretary of Defense (Comptroller)/CFO
- In office 27 July 2004 – 26 September 2008
- President: George W. Bush
- Preceded by: Dov S. Zakheim
- Succeeded by: Robert F. Hale

Personal details
- Education: Arizona State University (BA); Georgetown University

Tina Westby Jonas is an expert in military, defense, and aerospace industries. She was an undersecretary of defense at the United States Department of Defense and had also served as chief financial officer of the Federal Bureau of Investigation.

Jonas is currently an independent consultant in the defense and aerospace industries. She also serves in various boards in organizations in these sectors such as The Aerospace Corporation, Virgin Galactic, and National Defense Industrial Association, among others.

== Education ==
Jonas obtained her degree in political science from Arizona State University. She then completed her master's degree in liberal arts at Georgetown University. She also holds executive degrees from Harvard University's Kennedy School of Government, Northwestern University, Kellogg School of Management, and the University of Virginia's UTC Executive Education Program.

== Career ==
Jonas became part of the House Appropriations defense subcommittee from 1995 to 2001. She worked under U.S. Representative Jerry Lewis of California, who recommended her to Dov S. Zakheim. She was hired as one of Zakheim's deputies. In August 2002, she joined the Federal Bureau of Investigation and was later promoted to the position of Chief Financial Officer and assistant director of the FBI Finance Division. She was appointed the Undersecretary of Defense (Comptroller), the top budget official at the Pentagon in 2004. She held this position after Robert Gates became the Secretary of Defense in 2006. Jonas oversaw DoD's financial management, including the 2006 budget worth more than $400 billion.

An account described Jonas as a "liberal Republican" and was opposed by Conservatives for working against Donald Rumsfeld. She was also criticized by some defense officials for her treatment of senior budget officials who refused to work for her and eventually resigned during her years at the Pentagon. In her tenure, Jonas shut down the international office that coordinated the Afghanistan reconstruction, which was created by Zakheim. Jonas focused on the traditional role of the Defense comptroller until she ended her service in 2008.

For her public service, Jonas was awarded the Distinguished Public Service at the DoD, the Joint Distinguished Civilian Service Award of the Chairman of the Joint Chiefs of Staff, the Distinguished Public Service Award for the Department of the Navy as well as the Army and Coast Guard, and the DOD Inspector General's Award for Excellence.
