= Peter B. Teets =

American national security official (1942–2020)

Peter Teets
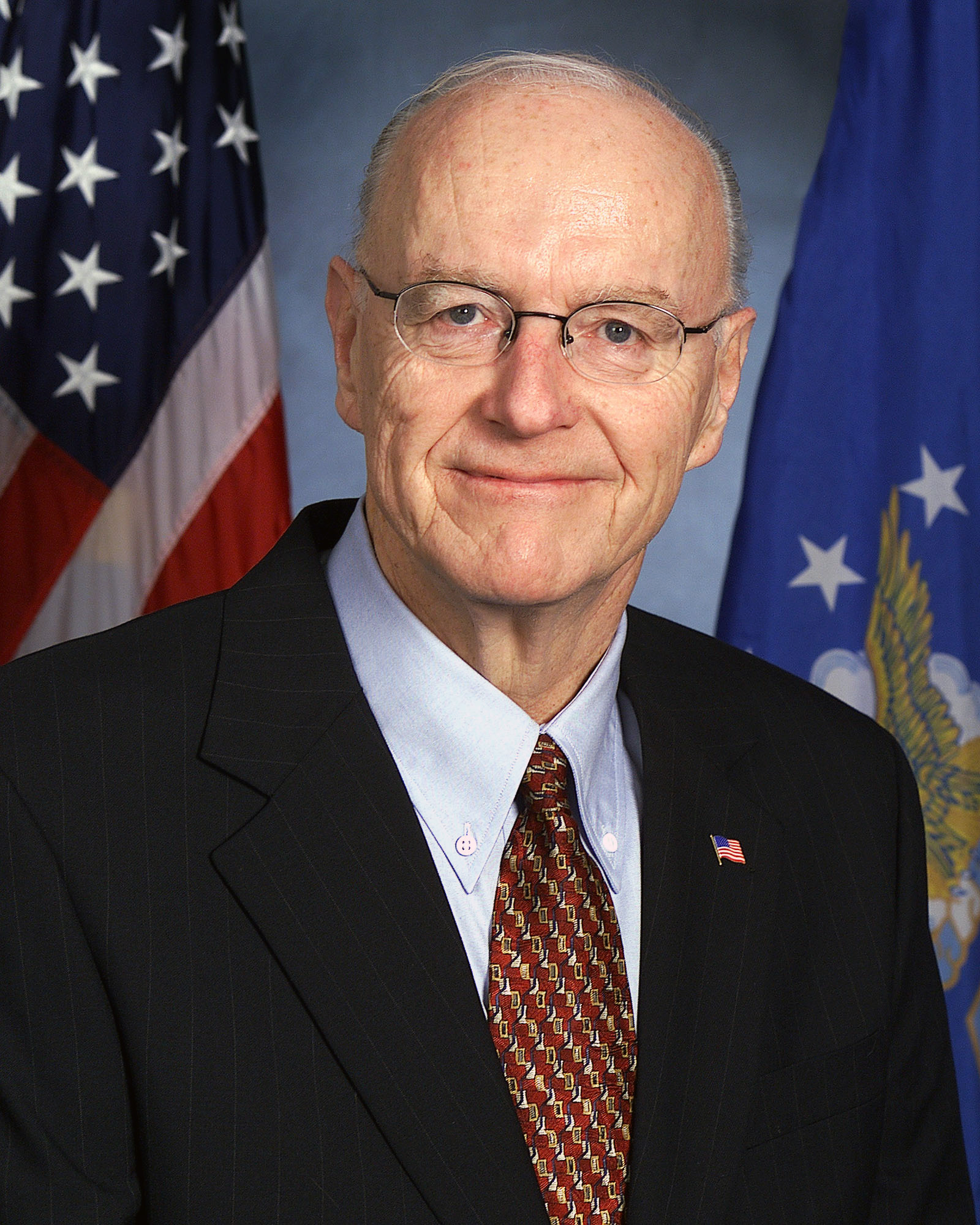

United States Secretary of the Air Force
- Acting
- In office January 20, 2005 – March 25, 2005
- President: George W. Bush
- Preceded by: James G. Roche
- Succeeded by: Michael Montelongo (acting)

Director of the National Reconnaissance Office
- In office December 13, 2001 – March 2005
- President: George W. Bush
- Preceded by: Keith R. Hall
- Succeeded by: Donald Kerr

United States Under Secretary of the Air Force
- In office April 15, 2001 – March 25, 2005
- President: George W. Bush
- Preceded by: Lawrence J. Delaney (acting)
- Succeeded by: Ronald M. Sega

Personal details
- Born: Peter Burritt Teets; February 12, 1942 Denver, Colorado, U.S.
- Died: November 29, 2020 (aged 78) Colorado Springs, Colorado, U.S.
- Spouses: Kathryn Zarini; Vivian Brearley
- Children: 6
- Education: University of Colorado, Boulder (BS, MS); Massachusetts Institute of Technology (MS)

Peter Burritt Teets (February 12, 1942 – November 29, 2020) was the thirteenth Director of the National Reconnaissance Office and the Under Secretary of the Air Force.

Teets organized a comprehensive national security space enterprise, laying the groundwork for the integration of both public and classified space activities in support of national security objectives. He commissioned panels on space acquisition policies and space launch initiatives. He greatly improved the acquisition, operation, and effectiveness of national security space capabilities.

== Education ==
1963 Bachelor of Science degree in applied mathematics, University of Colorado, Boulder

1965 Master of Science degree in applied mathematics, University of Colorado, Denver

1978 Master of Science degree in management, Massachusetts Institute of Technology, Cambridge

== Career Chronology ==
1. 1963-1970, engineer for flight control analysis, Martin Marietta, Denver, Colo.

2. 1970-1975, manager, Titan IIIC inertial guidance system, Martin Marietta, Denver, Colo.

3. 1975-1980, Program Manager, Transtage Project, and Director of Space Systems, Martin Marietta, Denver, Colo.

4. 1980-1982, Vice President of Business Development, Martin Marietta Denver Aerospace, Denver, Colo.

5. 1982-1985, Vice President and General Manager, Aerospace Strategic and Launch Systems Division, Martin Marietta Denver Aerospace, Denver, Colo.

6. 1985-1993, President, Martin Marietta Denver Aerospace, Denver, Colo.

7. 1993-1995, President, Martin Marietta Space Group, Bethesda, Md.

8. 1995-1997, President and Chief Operating Officer, Lockheed Martin Information and Services Sector, Bethesda, Md.

9. 1997-1999, President and Chief Operating Officer, Lockheed Martin Corp., Bethesda, Md.

10. 2001-2005, Undersecretary of the Air Force, Washington, D.C.

11. 2005-, Board of Trustees, The Aerospace Corporation, El Segundo, Ca.

== Awards and honors ==
Sloan Fellow

1990 Honorary Doctor of Science Degree, University of Colorado

2004 W. Stuart Symington Award (for most significant contribution by a civilian for national defense)

2009 Gen. James E. Hill Lifetime Space Achievement Award

Wernher von Braun Space Flight Trophy

Bob Hope Distinguished Citizen Award

On 7 October 2016, Teets was inducted into the Colorado Space Hall of Fame.

PROFESSIONAL MEMBERSHIPS AND ASSOCIATIONS

Fellow, American Institute of Aeronautics and Astronautics

Fellow, American Astronautical Society

National Academy of Engineering

Government offices
Preceded by Lawrence B. Delaney; Acting	United States Under Secretary of the Air Force; 2001–2005	Succeeded by Ronald M. Sega
Preceded by Keith R. Hall	Director of the National Reconnaissance Office; 2001–2005	Succeeded by Donald Kerr
Preceded by James G. Roche	United States Secretary of the Air Force; Acting; 2005	Succeeded by Michael Montelongo; Acting
