= Robert F. Hale =

American government official (born 1947)

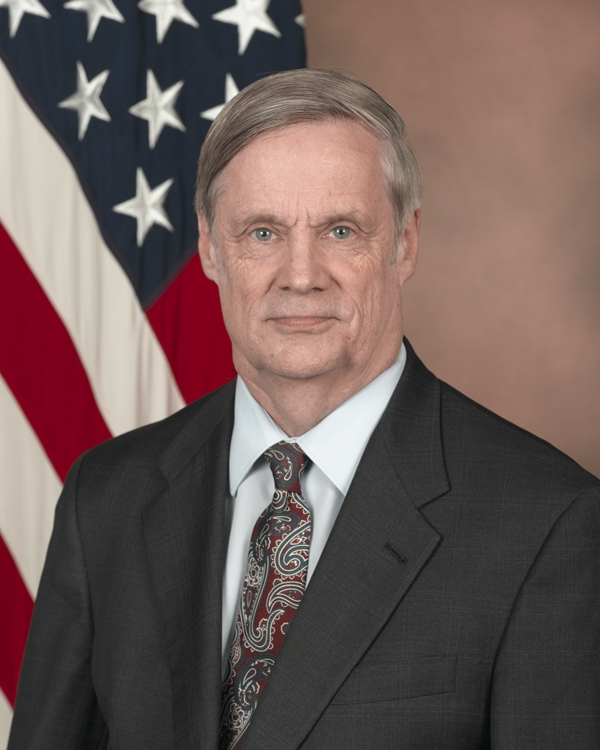
- Official portrait, 2009

5th Under Secretary of Defense (Comptroller)/CFO
- In office February 9, 2009 – June 27, 2014
- President: Barack Obama
- Preceded by: Tina W. Jonas
- Succeeded by: Michael J. McCord

Assistant Secretary of the Air Force for Financial Management & Comptroller
- In office March 30, 1994 – January 20, 2001
- President: Bill Clinton
- Preceded by: Michael B. Donley
- Succeeded by: Michael Montelongo

Personal details
- Born: January 21, 1947 (age 79) Sacramento, California
- Education: Stanford University (BS, MA); George Washington University (MBA)

Robert F. Hale (born 1947) was the United States Under Secretary of Defense (Comptroller) from 2009 until 2014 and the Comptroller and Assistant Secretary of the Air Force for Financial Management from 1994 to 2001. He currently serves as a senior advisor at the Center for Strategic and International Studies.

== Early life ==
Hale was born on January 21, 1947. He was raised in Fairfield, California, graduating from Armijo High School in 1964. He attended Stanford University, graduating with honors and receiving a Bachelor of Science degree in mathematics and statistics. He earned a Master's degree in operations research from Stanford, and later a Master of Business Administration from George Washington University.

Hale spent three years on active duty as an officer in the United States Navy, serving first with a Navy security group in Okinawa, Japan and then in Washington, D.C. After completing his Navy tour in 1972, he took a civilian position at the Center for Naval Analyses, serving as an analyst and later a study director. In 1975, Hale joined Logistics Management Institute or LMI, a not-for-profit consulting firm specializing in service to the Federal government. He was selected as a fellow of the institute, and eventually, headed LMI's acquisition and grants management group.

== Public service ==
After leaving LMI, Hale took a key position at the Congressional Budget Office, non-partisan agency that supports the United States Congress. During his tenure at the Congressional Budget Office, Hale was responsible for analyzing major defense budget issues. He also frequently testified before Congressional committees regarding the results of budget studies conducted by the Congressional Budget Office. He headed the Congressional Budget Office's National Security Division for twelve years before President Bill Clinton nominated Hale to be Assistant Secretary of the Air Force (Financial Management and Comptroller).

Hale served in the Clinton Administration as the Comptroller and Assistant Secretary of the Air Force for Financial Management from 1994 to 2001. As chief financial officer for the United States Air Force, Hale was responsible for annual budgets of approximately $70 billion. During his tenure, Hale initiated important process changes that streamlined the Air Force's financial management system to bring it into compliance with the Chief Financial Officers Act of 1990.

When he left the Air Force, the American Society of Military Comptrollers selected Hale to be the society's full-time Executive Director. The society offers career development opportunities and financial management training to its 18,000 members. During his tenure as executive director, Hale was a strong advocate for the society's professional certification program, a challenging four part examination leading to recognition as a Certified Defense Financial Manager. Hale planned and conducted the society's National Professional Development Institute, an annual conference that offers training to over 3,500 participants. He was also responsible for publishing the society's well respected professional journal, Armed Forces Comptroller.

== Defense comptroller ==
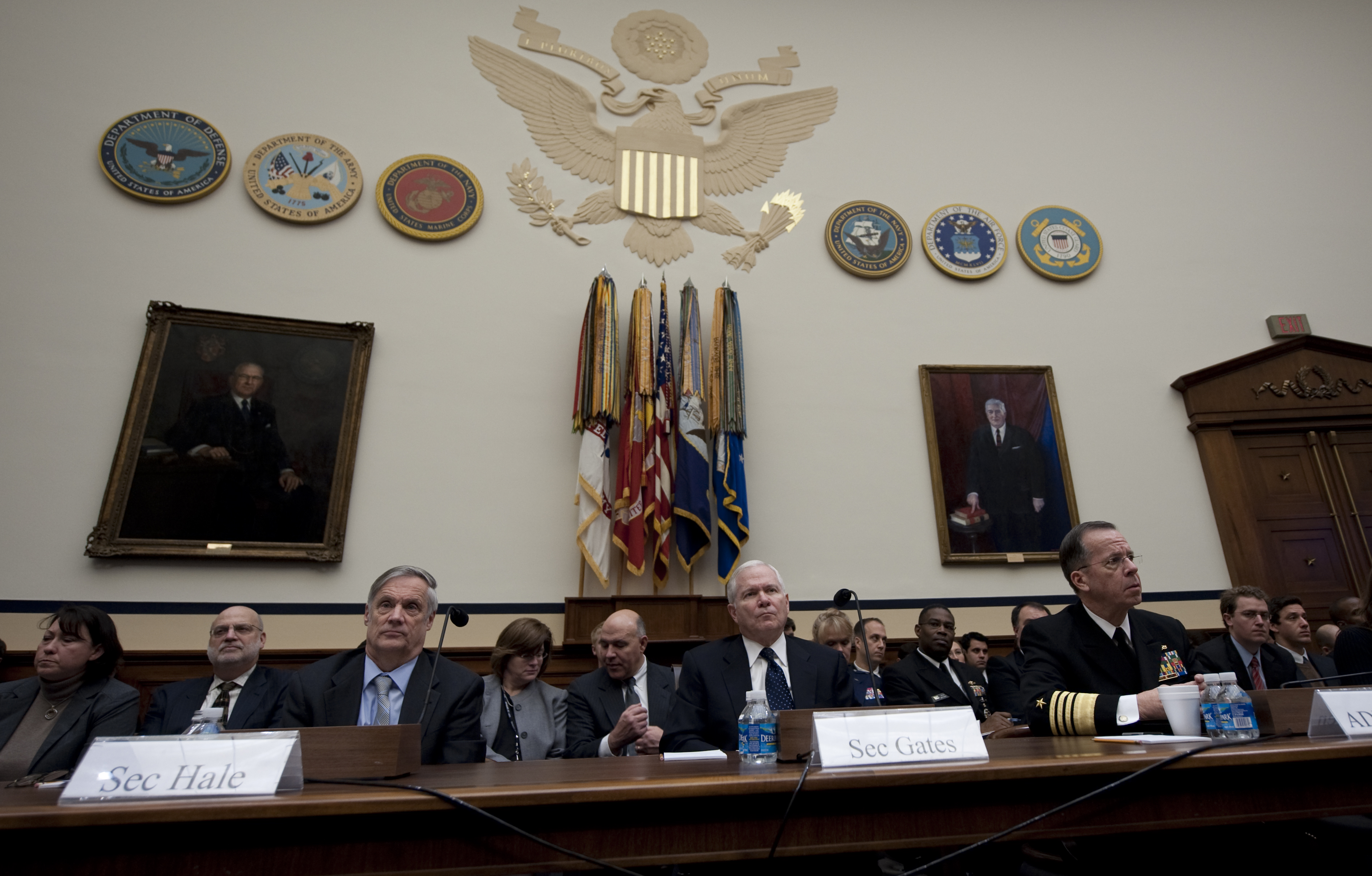
Robert Hale along with Secretary of Defense Robert M. Gates and Navy Adm. Mike Mullen testify to the House Armed Services Committee on the FY 2011 defense budget

President Barack Obama nominated Hale to be Under Secretary of Defense (Comptroller) on January 9, 2009. During his confirmation hearing on January 15, 2009, Hale reminded the Senate Armed Services Committee that he had over thirty years of experience in defense related financial management. The United States Senate confirmed his appointment on February 9, 2009. As chief financial officer for the Department of Defense, Hale is the principal advisor to Secretary of Defense Chuck Hagel on all fiscal matters including the development and execution of the department's annual budget, which at time of his appointment, was over $600 billion (including war supplemental spending). Hale is also responsible for financial policy, accounting and financial reporting, financial management systems, and business modernization efforts within the Defense Department.

In a briefing on September 27, 2013, Hale warned that lapse in funding caused by the federal government shutdown of 2013 would cause a delay in military death-benefit payments for the families of U.S. troops killed in action (such as the $100,000 "death gratuity," the burial benefit, and the survivors' housing allowance). Hale called the situation a "ghoulish" legal consequence of the shutdown. Despite Hale's warnings, "it took until the second week of the crisis for members of Congress to propose doing anything about it." On October 10, 2013, Congress eventually passed a bill authorizing emergency payments to the families of deceased soldiers during the government shutdown, which President Obama signed into law the same day.

== Other accomplishments ==
Hale is a Certified Defense Financial Manager and a past national president of the American Society of Military Comptrollers (1997–1998). He is a fellow of the National Academy of Public Administration and a former member of the Defense Business Board, a high-level Pentagon advisory panel. Hale was a member of the Task Force on the Future of Military Healthcare, which issued a report in June 2008 on how to create a cost-effective healthcare system for military members and their families.

Hale was selected as a Booz Allen Fellow in November 2014. In that position, he serves as an advisor to the Booz Allen Hamilton corporate leadership.

== Awards ==
Hale has received several prestigious awards for his public service. They include:

- Department of Defense Exceptional Public Service Award
- Air Force Distinguished Service Award
- National Defense Medal

Government offices
Preceded by Michael B. Donley	Assistant Secretary of the Air Force (Financial Management & Comptroller); 1994 – 2001	Succeeded by Michael Montelongo
Preceded by Tina W. Jonas	Under Secretary of Defense (Comptroller); February 9, 2009 – June 2014	Succeeded by Michael J. McCord
