= United States Secretary of the Air Force =

Statutory office and the head of the U.S. Department of the Air Force

- Seal of the Department of the Air Force

- Flag of the secretary

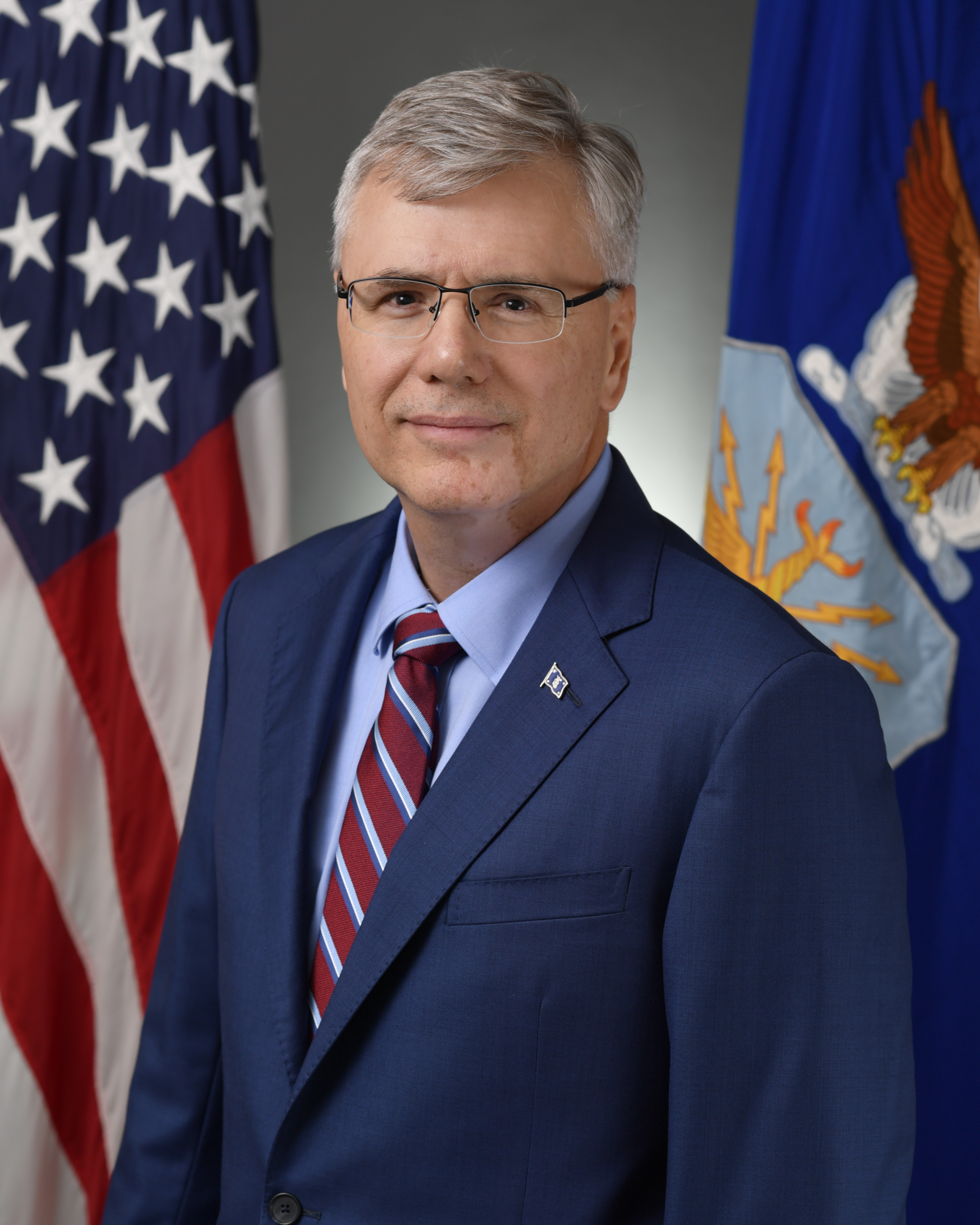
- Incumbent; Troy Meink since May 16, 2025
- Department of the Air Force
- Style: Mr. Secretary; The Honorable (formal address in writing)
- Reports to: Secretary of War; Deputy Secretary of War
- Appointer: The president with the advice and consent of the Senate
- Term length: No fixed term
- Precursor: Secretary of War
- Inaugural holder: Stuart Symington
- Formation: September 18, 1947; 78 years ago
- Succession: 3rd in SecDef succession
- Deputy: The under secretary (principal civilian deputy); The chief of staff (military deputy); The chief of space operations (military deputy)
- Salary: Executive Schedule, Level II
- Website: Office of the Secretary

The secretary of the Air Force, sometimes referred to as the secretary of the Department of the Air Force, (SecAF, or SAF/OS) is the head of the Department of the Air Force and the service secretary for the United States Air Force and United States Space Force. The secretary of the Air Force is a civilian appointed by the president, by and with the advice and consent of the Senate. The secretary reports to the secretary of defense and/or the deputy secretary of defense, and is by statute responsible for and has the authority to conduct all the affairs of the Department of the Air Force.

The secretary works closely with their civilian deputy, the under secretary of the Air Force; and their military deputies, the chief of staff of the Air Force and the chief of space operations.

The first secretary of the Air Force, Stuart Symington, was sworn in on September 18, 1947, upon the split and re-organization of the Department of War and Army Air Forces into an air military department and a military service of its own, with the enactment of the National Security Act.

== Responsibilities ==
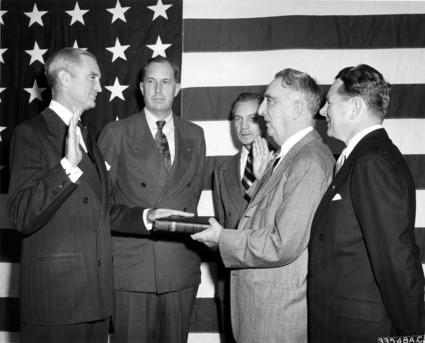
Stuart Symington is sworn-in as the first Secretary of the Air Force by Chief Justice Fred M. Vinson on September 18, 1947.

The secretary is the head of the Department of the Air Force. The Department of the Air Force is defined as a Military Department. It is not limited to the Washington headquarters staffs, rather it is an entity which includes all the components of the United States Air Force and United States Space Force, including their reserve components:

The term 'department', when used with respect to a military department, means the executive part of the department and all field headquarters, forces, reserve components, installations, activities, and functions under the control or supervision of the Secretary of the department.

The exclusive responsibilities of the secretary of the Air Force are enumerated in 10 U.S.C. § 9013(b) of the United States Code. They include, but are not limited to:

(1) Recruiting.

(2) Organizing.
(3) Supplying.
(4) Equipping (including research and development).
(5) Training.
(6) Servicing.
(7) Mobilizing.
(8) Demobilizing.
(9) Administering (including the morale and welfare of personnel).
(10) Maintaining.
(11) The construction, outfitting, and repair of military equipment.

(12) The construction, maintenance, and repair of buildings, structures, and utilities and the acquisition of real property and interests in real property necessary to carry out the responsibilities specified in this section.

By direction of the secretary of defense, the secretary of the Air Force assigns military units of the Air Force and Space Force, other than those who carry out the functions listed in 10 U.S.C. § 9013(b), to the Unified and Specified Combatant Commands to perform missions assigned to those commands. Air Force and Space Force units while assigned to Combatant Commands may only be reassigned by authority of the secretary of defense.

However, the chain of command for Air Force and Space Force units for other purposes than the operational direction goes from the president to the secretary of defense to the secretary of the Air Force to the commanders of Air Force and Space Force Commands. Air Force and Space Force officers have to report on any matter to the secretary, or the secretary's designate, when requested. The secretary has the authority to detail, prescribe the duties, and to assign Air Force and Space Force service members and civilian employees, and may also change the title of any activity not statutorily designated. The secretary has several responsibilities under the Uniform Code of Military Justice (UCMJ) with respect to Air Force and Space Force service members, including the authority to convene general courts martial and to commute sentences.

The secretary of the Air Force may also be assigned additional responsibilities by the president or the secretary of defense, e.g. the secretary is designated as the "DoD Executive Agent for Space", and as such:

... shall develop, coordinate, and integrate plans and programs for space systems and the acquisition of DoD Space Major Defense Acquisition Programs to provide operational space force capabilities to ensure the United States has the space power to achieve its national security objectives.

== Office of the Secretary of the Air Force ==
Office of the Secretary of the Air Force

Agency overview
- Formed: 1947
- Headquarters: Pentagon
- Parent agency: Department of the Air Force

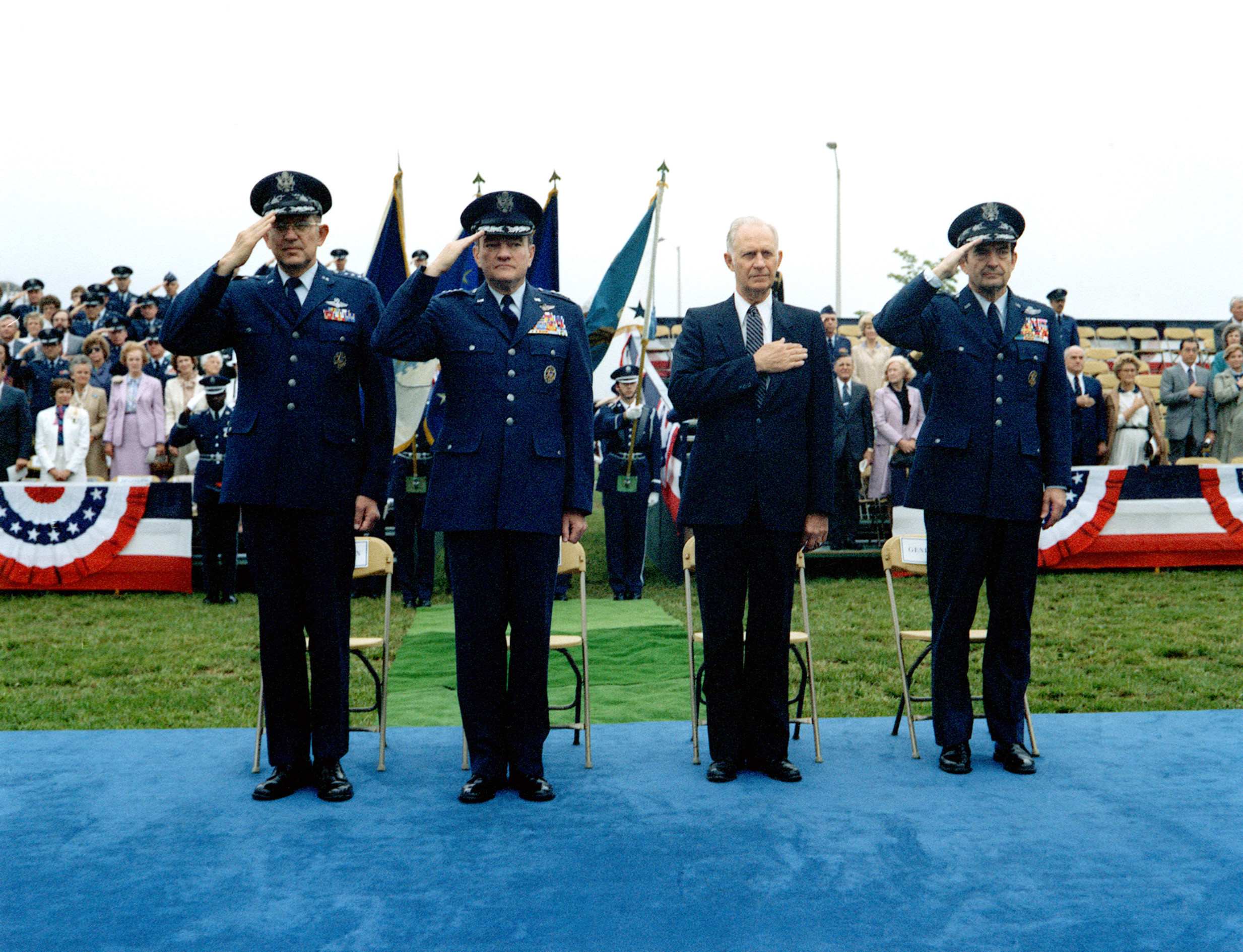
Secretary of the Air Force Verne Orr with Chairman of The Joint Chiefs of Staff General David C. Jones and Air Force Chief of Staff General Lew Allen and Air Force Vice Chief of Staff General Robert C. Mathis at Bolling Air Force Base on May 28, 1982

The secretary of the Air Force's principal staff element, the Office of the Secretary of the Air Force, has responsibility for acquisition and auditing, comptroller issues (including financial management), inspector general matters, legislative affairs, and public affairs within the Department of the Air Force. The Office of the Secretary of the Air Force is one of the Department of the Air Force's three headquarter staffs at the seat of government, with the others being the Air Staff and the Office of the Chief of Space Operations.

=== Composition ===
The Office of the Secretary of the Air Force is composed of:

- Under Secretary of the Air Force
  - The Deputy Under Secretary of the Air Force for International Affairs
  - The Deputy Under Secretary of the Air Force for Space Programs
- Assistant Secretary of the Air Force for Acquisition, Technology and Logistics
- Assistant Secretary of the Air Force for Energy, Installations and Environment
- Assistant Secretary of the Air Force for Financial Management and Comptroller
- Assistant Secretary of the Air Force for Manpower and Reserve Affairs
- Assistant Secretary of the Air Force for Space Acquisition and Integration
- General Counsel of the Department of the Air Force
- Inspector General of the Air Force
- Chief of Legislative Liaison
- Administrative Assistant to the Secretary of the Air Force
- Auditor General of the Department of the Air Force
- Air Reserve Forces Policy Committee

== History ==
The Air Corps Act of 1926 (44 Stat. 780), passed on July 2 of that year, created a second assistant secretary position in the War Department variously called "Assistant Secretary of War for Aviation," "Assistant Secretary of War for Air," or "Assistant Secretary of War for Aeronautics." Those holding the office, with an eight-year vacancy between 1933 and 1941, were F. Trubee Davison (1926–1933), Robert A. Lovett (1941–1945), and Stuart Symington (1946–1947), who became the first Secretary of the Air Force.

== List of secretaries of the Air Force ==
Denotes acting capacity.

=== Assistant Secretaries of War for Air ===
No.	Image	Name	Start	End	Duration	President(s)
1		Trubee Davison	July 2, 1926	March 4, 1933	6 years, 245 days	Calvin Coolidge (1923–1929)
1		Trubee Davison	July 2, 1926	March 4, 1933	6 years, 245 days	Herbert Hoover (1929–1933)
Vacant			March 4, 1933	April 10, 1941	8 years, 37 days	Franklin D. Roosevelt (1933–1945)
2		Robert Lovett	April 10, 1941	December 8, 1945	4 years, 242 days	Franklin D. Roosevelt (1933–1945)
2		Robert Lovett	April 10, 1941	December 8, 1945	4 years, 242 days	Harry S. Truman (1945–1953)
3		Stuart Symington	January 3, 1946	September 18, 1947	1 year, 258 days	Harry S. Truman (1945–1953)

=== Secretaries of the Air Force ===
No.	Image	Name	Start	End	Duration	President(s)
1		Stuart Symington	September 18, 1947	April 24, 1950	2 years, 218 days	Harry S. Truman (1945–1953)
2		Thomas K. Finletter	April 24, 1950	January 20, 1953	2 years, 271 days	Harry S. Truman (1945–1953)
3		Harold E. Talbott	February 4, 1953	August 13, 1955	2 years, 190 days	Dwight D. Eisenhower (1953–1961)
4		Donald A. Quarles	August 15, 1955	April 30, 1957	1 year, 258 days	Dwight D. Eisenhower (1953–1961)
5		James H. Douglas Jr.	May 1, 1957	December 10, 1959	2 years, 223 days	Dwight D. Eisenhower (1953–1961)
6		Dudley C. Sharp	December 11, 1959	January 20, 1961	1 year, 40 days	Dwight D. Eisenhower (1953–1961)
7		Eugene M. Zuckert	January 24, 1961	September 30, 1965	4 years, 249 days	John F. Kennedy (1961–1963)
7		Eugene M. Zuckert	January 24, 1961	September 30, 1965	4 years, 249 days	Lyndon B. Johnson (1963–1969)
8		Harold Brown	October 1, 1965	February 15, 1969	3 years, 137 days	Lyndon B. Johnson (1963–1969)
8		Harold Brown	October 1, 1965	February 15, 1969	3 years, 137 days	Richard Nixon (1969–1974)
9		Robert C. Seamans Jr.	February 15, 1969	May 15, 1973	4 years, 89 days	Richard Nixon (1969–1974)
10		John L. McLucas	May 15, 1973	July 18, 1973	2 years, 192 days	Richard Nixon (1969–1974)
10		John L. McLucas	July 18, 1973	November 23, 1975	2 years, 192 days	Richard Nixon (1969–1974)
10		John L. McLucas	July 18, 1973	November 23, 1975	2 years, 192 days	Gerald Ford (1974–1977)
11		Thomas C. Reed	January 2, 1976	April 6, 1977	1 year, 94 days	Gerald Ford (1974–1977)
11		Thomas C. Reed	January 2, 1976	April 6, 1977	1 year, 94 days	Jimmy Carter (1977–1981)
12		John C. Stetson	April 6, 1977	May 18, 1979	2 years, 42 days	Jimmy Carter (1977–1981)
13		Hans Mark	May 18, 1979	July 26, 1979	1 year, 267 days	Jimmy Carter (1977–1981)
13		Hans Mark	July 26, 1979	February 9, 1981	1 year, 267 days	Jimmy Carter (1977–1981)
13		Hans Mark	July 26, 1979	February 9, 1981	1 year, 267 days	Ronald Reagan (1981–1989)
14		Verne Orr	February 9, 1981	November 30, 1985	4 years, 294 days	Ronald Reagan (1981–1989)
15		Russell A. Rourke	December 9, 1985	April 6, 1986	118 days	Ronald Reagan (1981–1989)
16		Edward C. Aldridge Jr.	April 6, 1986	June 8, 1986	2 years, 254 days	Ronald Reagan (1981–1989)
16		Edward C. Aldridge Jr.	June 9, 1986	December 16, 1988	2 years, 254 days	Ronald Reagan (1981–1989)
–		James F. McGovern	December 16, 1988	April 29, 1989	134 days	Ronald Reagan (1981–1989)
–		James F. McGovern	December 16, 1988	April 29, 1989	134 days	George H. W. Bush (1989–1993)
–		John J. Welch Jr.	April 29, 1989	May 21, 1989	22 days	George H. W. Bush (1989–1993)
17		Donald B. Rice	May 21, 1989	January 20, 1993	3 years, 244 days	George H. W. Bush (1989–1993)
–		Michael B. Donley; Acting	January 20, 1993	July 13, 1993	174 days	Bill Clinton (1993–2001)
–		Merrill A. McPeak; Acting	July 14, 1993	August 5, 1993	22 days	Bill Clinton (1993–2001)
18		Sheila Widnall	August 6, 1993	October 31, 1997	4 years, 86 days	Bill Clinton (1993–2001)
19		F. Whitten Peters	November 1, 1997	July 30, 1999	3 years, 80 days	Bill Clinton (1993–2001)
19		F. Whitten Peters	July 30, 1999	January 20, 2001	3 years, 80 days	Bill Clinton (1993–2001)
–		Lawrence J. Delaney; Acting	January 21, 2001	May 31, 2001	130 days	George W. Bush (2001–2009)
20		James G. Roche	June 1, 2001	January 20, 2005	3 years, 233 days	George W. Bush (2001–2009)
–		Peter B. Teets; Acting	January 20, 2005	March 25, 2005	64 days	George W. Bush (2001–2009)
–		Michael Montelongo; Acting	March 25, 2005	March 28, 2005	3 days	George W. Bush (2001–2009)
–		Michael L. Dominguez; Acting	March 28, 2005	July 29, 2005	123 days	George W. Bush (2001–2009)
–		Pete Geren; Acting	July 29, 2005	November 4, 2005	98 days	George W. Bush (2001–2009)
21		Michael Wynne	November 4, 2005	June 20, 2008	2 years, 229 days	George W. Bush (2001–2009)
22		Michael B. Donley	June 21, 2008	October 2, 2008	5 years, 0 days	George W. Bush (2001–2009)
22		Michael B. Donley	October 2, 2008	June 21, 2013	5 years, 0 days	George W. Bush (2001–2009)
22		Michael B. Donley	October 2, 2008	June 21, 2013	5 years, 0 days	Barack Obama (2009–2017)
–		Eric Fanning; Acting	June 21, 2013	December 20, 2013	182 days	Barack Obama (2009–2017)
23		Deborah Lee James	December 20, 2013	January 20, 2017	3 years, 31 days	Barack Obama (2009–2017)
–		Lisa Disbrow; Acting	January 20, 2017	May 16, 2017	116 days	Donald Trump (2017–2021)
24		Heather Wilson	May 16, 2017	May 31, 2019	2 years, 15 days	Donald Trump (2017–2021)
–		Matthew Donovan; Acting	June 1, 2019	October 18, 2019	139 days	Donald Trump (2017–2021)
25		Barbara Barrett	October 18, 2019	January 20, 2021	1 year, 94 days	Donald Trump (2017–2021)
–		John P. Roth; Acting	January 20, 2021	July 28, 2021	189 days	Joe Biden (2021–2025)
26		Frank Kendall III	July 28, 2021	January 20, 2025	3 years, 176 days	Joe Biden (2021–2025)
–		Gary A. Ashworth; Acting	January 20, 2025	May 13, 2025	113 days	Donald Trump (2025–present)
27		Troy Meink	May 16, 2025	Incumbent	1 year, 115 days	Donald Trump (2025–present)

== See also ==
- Department of the Air Force Decoration for Exceptional Civilian Service
