= Michael B. Donley =

American government official (born 1952)

Michael Donley
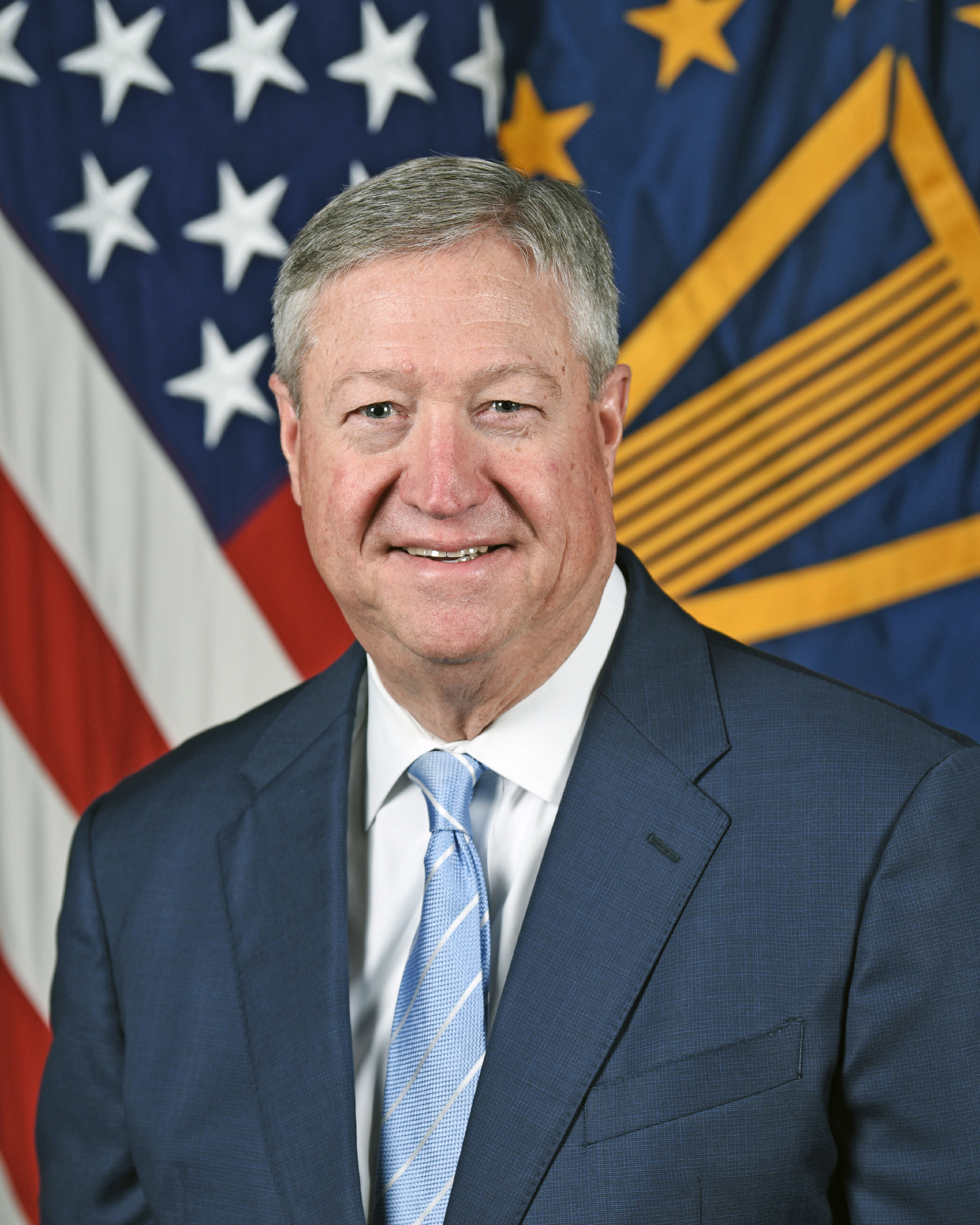
- Official portrait, 2021

3rd and 6th Director of Administration and Management for the Department of Defense
- In office May 5, 2021 – September 18, 2023
- President: Joe Biden
- Preceded by: Thomas Muir (acting)
- Succeeded by: Jennifer Walsh
- In office May 9, 2005 – June 20, 2008
- President: George W. Bush
- Preceded by: Raymond F. DuBois
- Succeeded by: Michael Rhodes

22nd United States Secretary of the Air Force
- In office June 21, 2008 – June 21, 2013; Acting: June 21, 2008 – October 2, 2008
- President: George W. Bush; Barack Obama
- Preceded by: Michael W. Wynne
- Succeeded by: Deborah Lee James

Assistant Secretary of the Air Force for Financial Management and Comptroller
- In office December 1, 1989 – January 19, 1993
- President: George H. W. Bush
- Preceded by: Richard E. Carver
- Succeeded by: Robert F. Hale

Personal details
- Born: Michael Bruce Donley; October 4, 1952 (age 73) Novato, California, U.S.
- Party: Republican
- Education: University of Southern California (BA, MA)

Military service
- Allegiance: United States
- Branch/service: United States Army
- Years of service: 1972–1975
- Unit: 18th Airborne Corps; 5th Special Forces Group

Michael Bruce Donley (born October 4, 1952) is a United States government official who was the director of administration and management in the Office of the Secretary of Defense from 2021 to 2023, having served in the same position from 2005 to 2008. In the Bush and Obama administrations, Donley served as the 22nd secretary of the Air Force, amongst other positions. Donley has 30 years of experience in the national security community, including service on the staff of the United States Senate, White House and The Pentagon.

== Early life ==
Donley was born in Novato, California. He earned his B.A. (1977) and M.A. (1978) in international relations from the University of Southern California. He also attended the Program for Senior Executives in National Security at Harvard University.

Donley served in the United States Army (1972–1975). He attended the Army's Intelligence School (1972), Airborne school (1974), and Defense Language Institute (1973). He served in the 18th Airborne Corps and 5th Special Forces Group.

== Public service ==
Donley was editor of the National Security Record for The Heritage Foundation in 1978 and part of 1979. He was a Legislative Assistant in the United States Senate from 1979 to 1981, and then a professional staff member on the Senate Armed Services Committee from 1981 to 1984.

Donley served as director of defense programs and deputy executive secretary at the National Security Council from 1984 through 1989. As deputy executive secretary, he oversaw the White House Situation Room and chaired interagency committees on crisis management procedures and continuity of government. Earlier, as director of defense programs, Donley was the NSC representative to the Defense Resources Board, and coordinated the President's quarterly meetings with the Joint Chiefs of Staff. He conceived and organized the President's Blue Ribbon Commission on Defense Management (the Packard Commission), coordinated White House policy on the Goldwater-Nichols DOD Reorganization Act of 1986, and wrote the National Security Strategy for President Ronald Reagan's second term.

In 1989, Donley was appointed as the Assistant Secretary of the Air Force (Financial Management and Comptroller). In this position, he was responsible for preparing the air force budget, cost estimating of weapon systems, economic analysis, and providing financial services to all air force personnel. He served as assistant secretary until 1993, when he became Acting Secretary of the Air Force. Donley served as acting secretary for seven months until July 1993.

After leaving the air force, Donley became a senior fellow at the Institute for Defense Analyses. He stayed at the institute until 1996 when he became a senior vice president at Hicks and Associates, Inc., a division of Science Applications International Corporation (SAIC). While there, he served as a special advisor to the United States Department of State for affairs in Bosnia-Herzegovina.

On May 9, 2005, United States Secretary of Defense Donald Rumsfeld appointed Donley director of administration and management. In this position, he oversaw 1,300 employees who provide administrative and support services to the Department of Defense's Washington headquarters, which includes The Pentagon. He was responsible for the $5.5 billion Pentagon Renovation and Construction Program.

== Secretary of the Air Force ==
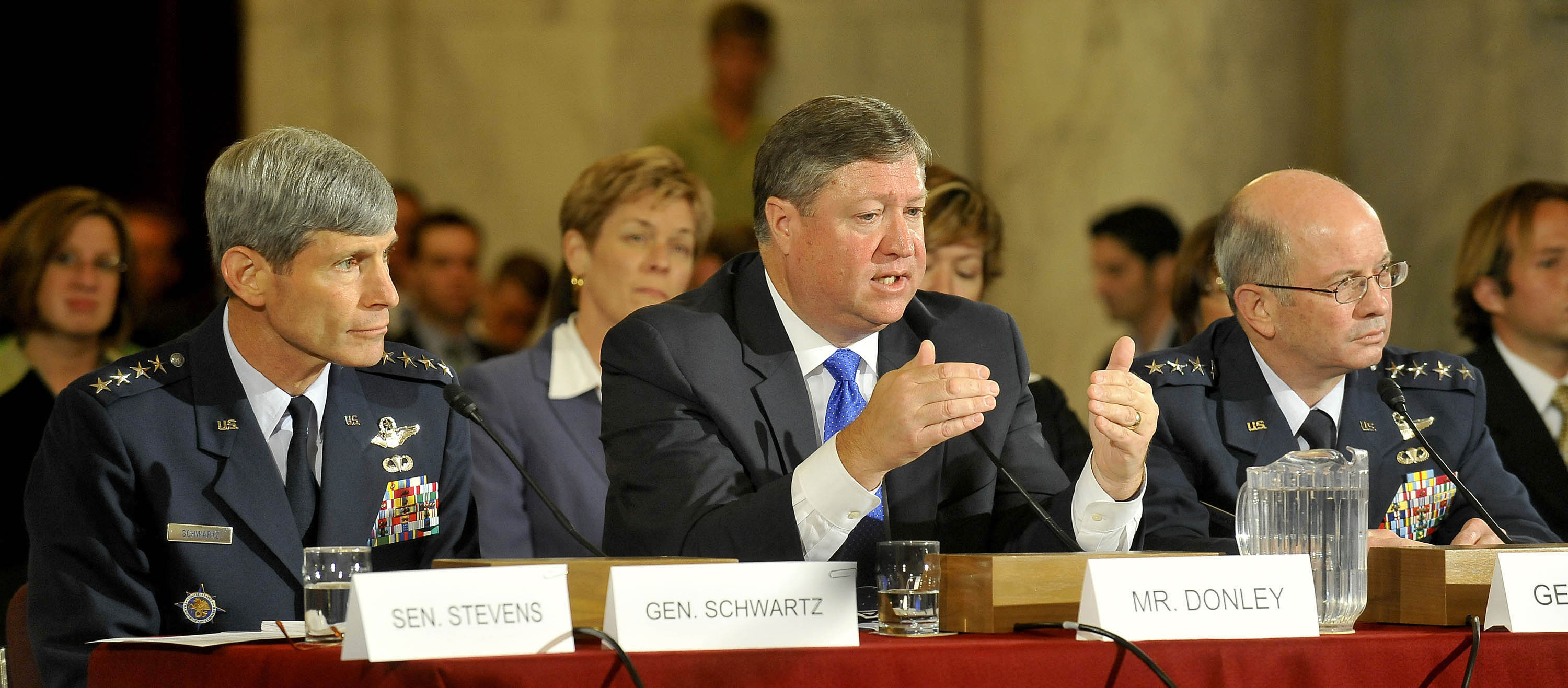
Secretary Donley testifying before the United States Senate

On June 9, 2008, Secretary of Defense Robert M. Gates recommended that President George W. Bush nominate Donley to become the Secretary of the Air Force. Gates also announced Donley would become the acting Secretary of the Air Force effective on June 21, 2008 (a position he had also held in 1993 with the start of the Clinton administration). The U.S. Senate confirmed his nomination as the 22nd Secretary of the Air Force on October 2, 2008. Donley was reappointed as the Secretary of the Air Force by President Barack Obama in January 2009.

As the Secretary of the Air Force, Donley was responsible for the operation of the Department of the Air Force, including organizing, training, equipping, and providing for the welfare of more than 300,000 men and women on active duty in the U.S. Air Force and their families, the 180,000 members of the Air National Guard and the Air Force Reserve, and 160,000 civilian employees of the air force. Donley also oversaw the annual budget of the Department of the Air Force, about $110 billion.

On April 13, 2009, Donley and Chief of Staff of the Air Force Norton A. Schwartz jointly published an opinion piece in The Washington Post supporting the decision by Secretary Gates to discontinue the production of the F-22 Raptor fighter plane. Donley stated the "requirements for fighter inventories have declined and F-22 program costs have risen."

On April 26, 2013, Donley announced plans to step down as the Secretary of the Air Force on June 21, 2013. He was succeeded on that date by acting secretary Eric Fanning.

== Later Public Service ==
In 2013, Donley was named to the Board of Trustees of The Aerospace Corporation, a non-profit Federally Funded Research and Development Center. He was elected as chairman of that board in 2017 but stepped down upon his return to federal service in May 2021, resuming his former role as Director of Administration and Management in the Office of the Secretary of Defense. He retired in 2023.

== Opposition to Donald Trump ==
In 2020, Donley, along with over 130 other former Republican national security officials, signed a statement that asserted that President Trump was unfit to serve another term, and "To that end, we are firmly convinced that it is in the best interest of our nation that Vice President Joe Biden be elected as the next President of the United States, and we will vote for him."

== Education ==
- 1972 U.S. Army Intelligence School, Fort Huachuca, Arizona
- 1973 Defense Language Institute, Presidio of Monterey, California
- 1974 U.S. Army Airborne School, Fort Benning, Georgia
- 1977 Bachelor of Arts degree in international relations, University of Southern California, Los Angeles
- 1978 Master of Arts degree in international relations, University of Southern California, Los Angeles
- 1986 Senior Executives in National Security program, Harvard Kennedy School, Harvard University, Cambridge, Massachusetts

== Career chronology ==
- 1972 – 1975, U.S. Army, XVIIIth Airborne Corps and 5th Special Forces Group (Airborne), Fort Bragg, North Carolina
- 1978 – 1979, editor, National Security Record, The Heritage Foundation, Washington, D.C.
- 1979 – 1981, legislative assistant, U.S. Senate, Washington, D.C.
- 1981 – 1984, professional staff member, Senate Armed Services Committee, Washington, D.C.
- 1984 – 1987, director of defense programs, National Security Council, The White House, Washington, D.C.
- 1987 – 1989, deputy executive secretary, National Security Council, the White House, Washington, D.C.
- 1989 – 1993, assistant Secretary of the Air Force (Financial Management and Comptroller), Washington, D.C.
- 1993, acting Secretary of the Air Force, Washington D.C.
- 1993 – 1996, senior fellow at the Institute for Defense Analyses, Alexandria, Virginia
- 1996 – 2005, senior vice president at Hicks and Associates, Inc. (a subsidiary of SAIC) McLean, Virginia
- 2005 – 2008, director of administration and management, Office of the Secretary of Defense, Washington, D.C.
- 2008 – 2013, Secretary of the Air Force, Washington, D.C.
- 2021 – 2023, director of administration and management, Office of the Secretary of Defense, Washington, D.C.

Government offices
Preceded by Richard E. Carver	Assistant Secretary of the Air Force for Financial Management and Comptroller; 1989–1993	Succeeded by Robert F. Hale
Preceded by Michael Wynne	United States Secretary of the Air Force; 2008–2013	Succeeded by Deborah Lee James
