= Pete Geren =

American attorney and politician (born 1952)

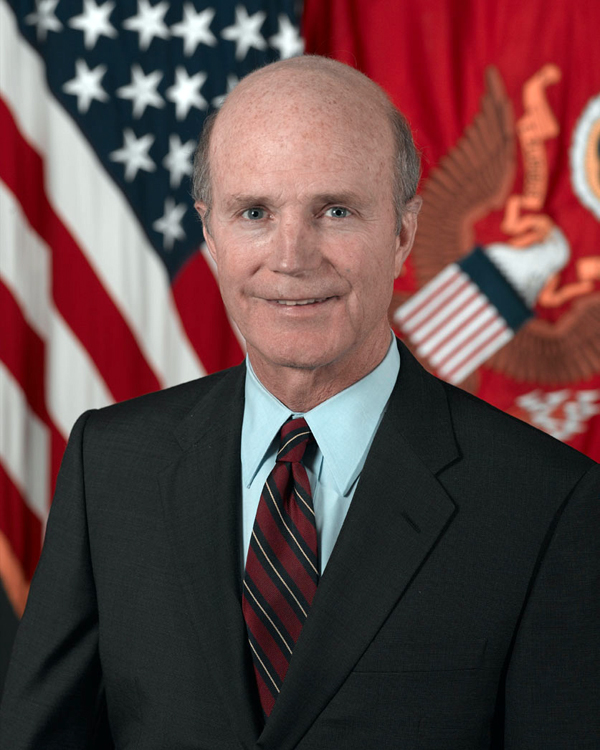
- Official portrait, 2007

20th United States Secretary of the Army
- In office March 9, 2007 – September 21, 2009; Acting: March 9, 2007 – July 19, 2007
- President: George W. Bush; Barack Obama
- Preceded by: Francis J. Harvey
- Succeeded by: John M. McHugh

United States Under Secretary of the Army
- In office February 21, 2006 – July 23, 2007
- President: George W. Bush
- Preceded by: Raymond F. DuBois
- Succeeded by: Nelson M. Ford

United States Secretary of the Air Force
- Acting
- In office June 29, 2005 – November 4, 2005
- President: George W. Bush
- Preceded by: Michael L. Dominguez (acting)
- Succeeded by: Michael Wynne

Member of the U.S. House of Representatives from Texas's 12th district
- In office September 12, 1989 – January 3, 1997 (Note: Geren's official service begins on the date of the special election, while he was not sworn in until September 20, 1989.)
- Preceded by: Jim Wright
- Succeeded by: Kay Granger

Personal details
- Born: Preston Murdoch Geren III; January 29, 1952 (age 74) Fort Worth, Texas, U.S.
- Party: Democratic
- Spouse: Beckie Ray
- Children: 3
- Relatives: Preston Geren Sr. (grandfather); Preston Geren Jr. (father); Charlie Geren (brother)
- Education: University of Texas, Austin (BA, JD)

Preston Murdoch "Pete" Geren III (born January 29, 1952) is an appointed member and President of the Board of Managers of the Fort Worth Independent School District and the president of the Sid W. Richardson Foundation in Fort Worth, Texas.

Previously, he was an attorney and politician who served as the 20th United States Secretary of the Army from July 16, 2007, to September 16, 2009. He is a former member of the United States House of Representatives from Texas's 12th congressional district, under the Democratic ticket. Geren has a mixed voting record, having switched to the Republican party since 2024.

Geren is a member of the board of trustees of the Institute for Defense Analyses in Alexandria, Virginia.

== Early life and education ==
Geren was born in Fort Worth, Texas, to Preston Geren Jr. He attended Georgia Tech in Atlanta, Georgia, from 1970 to 1973, where he was the starting center for the football team. He received his Bachelor of Arts from the University of Texas in 1974 and his Juris Doctor from the University of Texas School of Law in 1978.

His older brother, Charlie Geren, is a Republican member of the Texas House of Representatives from District 99 in Tarrant County.

== Career ==
Prior to entering public service, Geren was an attorney and businessman in Fort Worth. From 1983 to 1985 he was an aide to Democrat U.S. Senator Lloyd Bentsen of Texas.

=== U.S. House of Representatives ===
From 1989 until 1997, Geren served for four terms in the United States House of Representatives. He was first elected in a special election to succeed former Speaker of the House Jim Wright. He narrowly defeated the Republican candidate, well known Fort Worth allergist Bob Lanier (not to be confused with the mayor of Houston of the same name). Geren was re-elected for three more terms, but opted not to run in 1996. He was succeeded by Kay Granger.

While in Congress, Geren was credited with coining the term "Blue Dog Democrat". Moderate and conservative Democrats in Congress chose to name their group after this term, creating the Blue Dog Coalition. Geren opined that the members had been "choked blue" by "extreme" Democrats from the left. It is related to the political term "Yellow Dog Democrat," a reference to southern Democrats said to be so loyal they would even vote for a yellow dog if it were labeled a Democrat.

=== Department of Defense ===
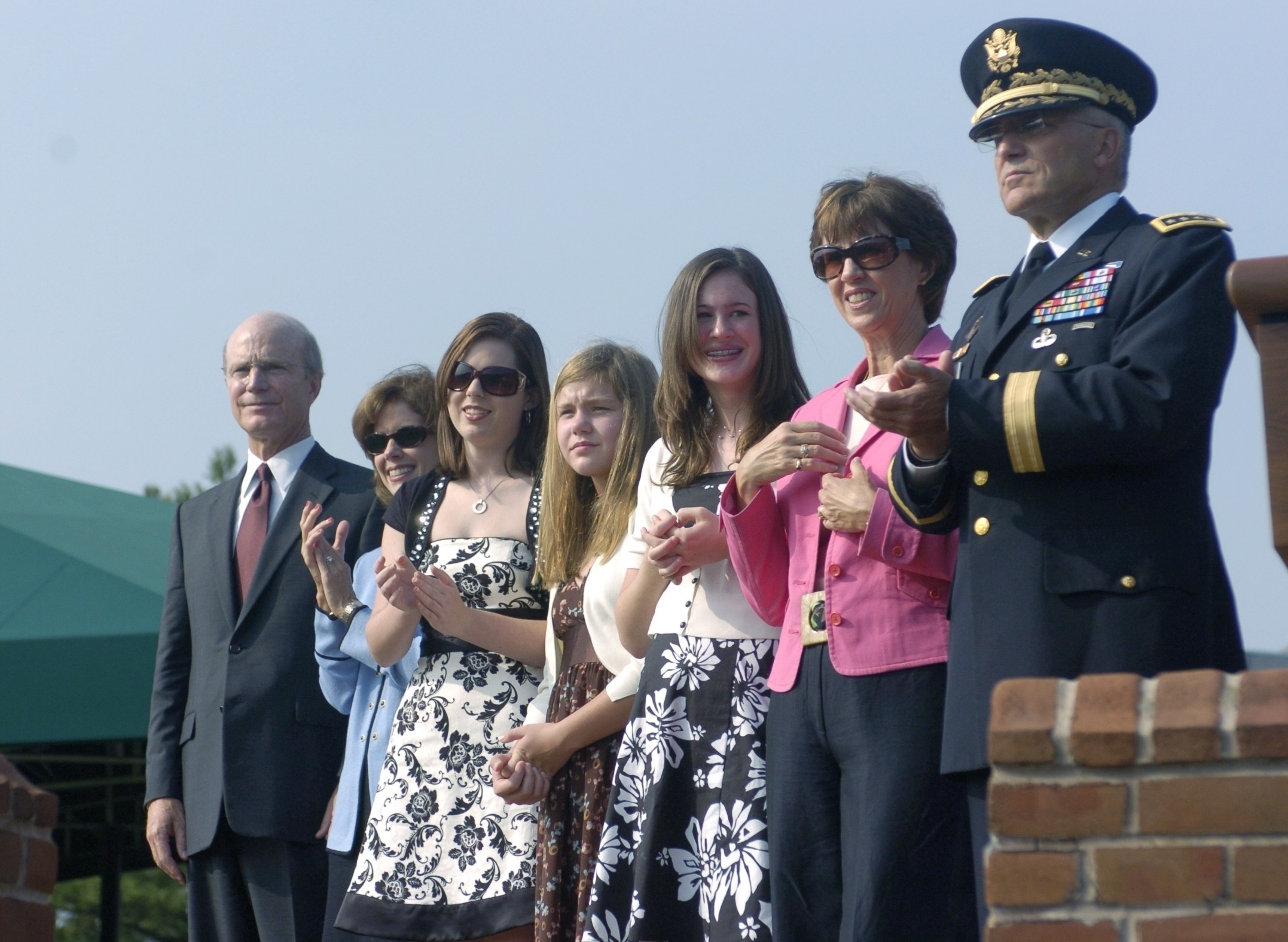
Army Secretary Pete Geren (far left), accompanied by (from left to right) his wife, Beckie, his children, Mrs. Shelia Casey and Army Chief of Staff Gen. George W. Casey Jr., during Mr. Geren's arrival ceremony as Secretary of the Army, Aug. 30, 2007.

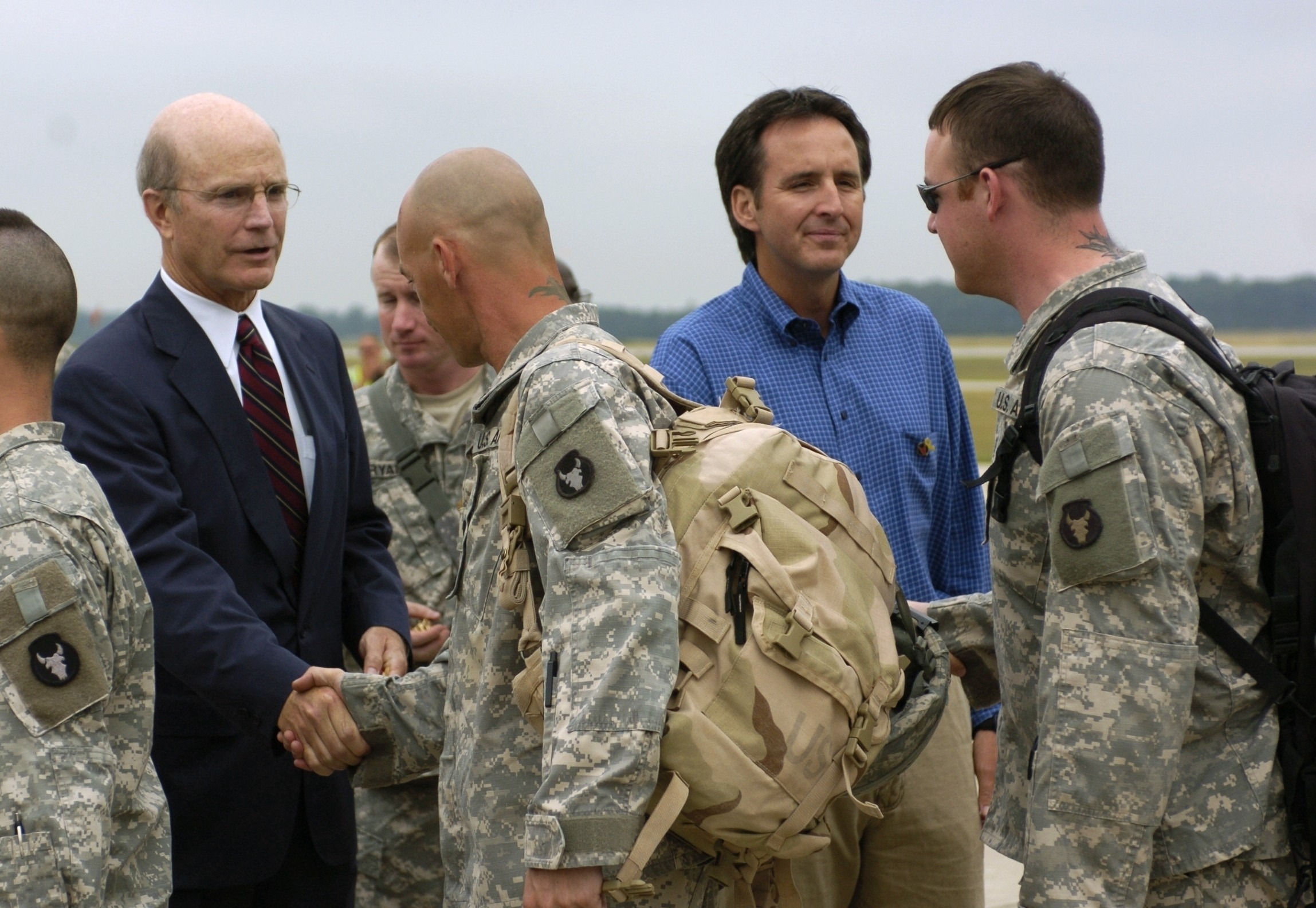
Secretary of the Army Pete Geren and Minnesota Governor Tim Pawlenty welcome home Minnesota National Guard Soldiers deployed with the 1st Brigade Combat Team, 34th Infantry Division for the past 17 months at Volk Field, Wis., July 17.

Geren joined the Department of Defense in September 2001 to serve as Special Assistant to the Defense Secretary with responsibilities in the areas of inter-agency initiatives, legislative affairs and special projects.

On July 29, 2005, Bush appointed Geren the acting United States Secretary of the Air Force, a position he served in until the confirmation of his successor Michael Wynne in November 2005.

Geren was the 28th Undersecretary of the Army, a post he assumed on February 21, 2006, following his nomination by President George W. Bush and confirmation by the United States Senate. As the Undersecretary, Geren was the Army's No. 2 civilian leader. He served as the deputy and senior advisor to the Secretary of the Army and was Acting Secretary in the absence of the Secretary.

In March 2007, Geren was named Acting Secretary of the United States Army by Defense Secretary Robert Gates, after Army Secretary Francis J. Harvey resigned amidst the scandal at Walter Reed Army Medical Center. On July 16, 2007, the Senate confirmed Geren as Secretary of the Army. On August 30, 2007, Geren established the independent Commission on Army Acquisition and Program Management in Expeditionary Operations to investigate the contingency contracting crisis within the army.

=== Sid W. Richardson Foundation ===
Since 2011, he has been president and CEO of the Sid W. Richardson Foundation, in Fort Worth, TX. For his services, Geren was paid nearly $1.1 million in 2024: $946,974 in base compensation, $94,327 in benefits and deferred compensation, and $40,135 in expense accounts in 2024.

=== Fort Worth ISD Board of Managers ===
On March 24, 2026, Texas Education Agency's Commissioner Mike Morath appointed Geren as one of nine members of the Fort Worth ISD Board of Managers during the state's takeover of the district.

The nine Board of Managers are expected to serve an initial term of at least two years before the state considers whether to restore governance authority to the elected trustees. Under state law, the intervention may be extended in additional two-year increments if the Commissioner determines that the district has not shown sufficient academic improvement.

== See also ==
- List of U.S. political appointments that crossed party lines

U.S. House of Representatives
Preceded by Jim Wright	Member of the U.S. House of Representatives from Texas's 12th congressional district 1989–1997	Succeeded by Kay Granger
Government offices
Preceded by Michael L. Dominguez; Acting	United States Secretary of the Air Force; Acting; 2005	Succeeded by Michael Wynne
Preceded by Francis J. Harvey	United States Secretary of the Army; 2007–2009	Succeeded by John M. McHugh
U.S. order of precedence (ceremonial)
Preceded by Steve Bartlett as Former U.S. Representative	Order of precedence of the United States as Former U.S. Representative	Succeeded by Greg Laughlin as Former U.S. Representative
