= Keith R. Hall =

American government official (born 1947)

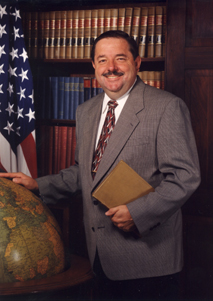

12th Director of the National Reconnaissance Office
- In office March 28, 1997 – December 13, 2001
- President: Bill Clinton; George W. Bush
- Preceded by: Jeffrey K. Harris
- Succeeded by: Peter B. Teets

Personal details
- Born: June 30, 1947 (age 79) Rockville Centre, New York, U.S.
- Education: Alfred University (BA); Clark University (MPA)

Military service
- Allegiance: United States
- Branch/service: United States Army
- Years of service: 1970–1979
- Rank: Captain
- Awards: Meritorious Service Medal (2)

Keith Ralph Hall (born June 30, 1947) is a United States government official who served as the 12th director of the National Reconnaissance Office (NRO).

Mr. Hall was appointed Deputy Director NRO and acting Director NRO concurrently in 1996, and promptly introduced financial management reforms culminating in a single NRO accounting system. He also convened an independent body of experts from the defense, intelligence, and corporate sectors to evaluate the future of the NRO.

Bringing the NRO to a financial sound position, Mr. Hall boosted the agency's credibility and made it a government-wide acquisition and contracting center of excellence. He strengthened the NRO's commitment to advanced research and development to revolutionize overhead reconnaissance architecture. Following his service at the NRO, Hall became a senior vice president at Booz Allen Hamilton.

Hall was born in Rockville Centre, New York and graduated from Valley Stream Central High School in June 1965. He earned a B.A. degree in history and political science from Alfred University in June 1969. Hall was commissioned as a United States Army intelligence officer in 1970, serving until 1979 and receiving two Meritorious Service Medals. He also received a Master of Public Administration degree from Clark University in June 1979.

Hall served as Deputy Assistant Secretary of Defense for Intelligence and Security from 1991 to 1995. While serving as director of the National Reconnaissance Office, he concurrently served as Assistant Secretary of the Air Force for Space from 1997 to 2001. Hall received an honorary Doctor of Science degree from Alfred University in 1997.
