= Assistant Secretary of the Air Force (Acquisition, Technology and Logistics) =

American civilian position

Assistant Secretary of the Air Force (Acquisition, Technology, and Logistics)
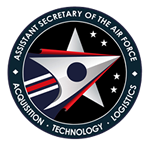
- Seal of the assistant secretary of the Air Force for acquisition, technology, and logistics

- Flag of an assistant secretary of the Air Force
- Incumbent; William D. Bailey; Acting since June 2, 2025
- Department of the Air Force
- Style: The Honorable
- Reports to: Secretary of the Air Force
- Seat: The Pentagon, Arlington County, Virginia, United States
- Nominator: The president with Senate advice and consent
- Term length: No fixed term
- Constituting instrument: 10 U.S.C. § 9016
- Formation: 1987
- Succession: 17th in SecDef succession by seniority of appointment
- Deputy: Principal Deputy Assistant Secretary of the Air Force Acquisition, Technology and Logistics; Principal Military Deputy for Acquisition, Technology and Logistics
- Salary: Executive Schedule, Level IV
- Website: ww3.safaq.hq.af.mil

Assistant Secretary of the Air Force (Acquisition, Technology, and Logistics) (SAF/AQ) is a civilian position in the Department of the Air Force that is appointed by the president of the United States and confirmed by the United States Senate. This position is established under Title 10 US Code Section 9016 and is one of five assistant secretary positions under the secretary of the Air Force. The SAF/AQ reports to the secretary of the Air Force.

Under the law, a principal military deputy serves with the assistant secretary for acquisition, logistics and technology. The principal military deputy is required to be an active duty officer with a background in acquisition and program management. If the assistant secretary position is vacant, the law permits the principal military deputy to serve up to a year as the acting assistant secretary. Of the five assistant secretary positions established by law, only the assistant secretary for acquisition, technology and logistics is required to have a principal military deputy.

== Responsibilities ==
The assistant secretary of the air force for acquisition serves as the single service acquisition executive (SAE) and the senior procurement executive for the Department of the Air Force. They are responsible for acquisition and product support for all air force acquisition programs and manages the air force science and technology program.

The assistant secretary directs the Air Force program executive officers on matters relating to acquisition management and conduct. The PEOs are not a part of Headquarters Air Force; rather, they are organized separately, but report to the service acquisition executive.

They provide direction, guidance and supervision of all matters pertaining to the formulation, review, approval and execution of acquisition plans, policies and programs. The assistant secretary oversees $40 billion annual investments that include major programs like the KC-46A Pegasus, F-35 Lighting II, B-21 Raider, as well as capability areas such as information technology and command and control, intelligence, surveillance and reconnaissance (C4ISR) systems.

== History ==
The assistant secretary of the air force for acquisition (SAF/AQ) position was created in 1987 by National Security Decision Directive 219, following recommendations from President Reagan's Blue Ribbon Commission on Defense Management. The commission recommended the Department of Defense have clear lines of authority for acquisition management and outlined roles and responsibilities between the Office of the Secretary of Defense and the military departments. This move established the defense acquisition executive, the service acquisition executives for each military department, and program executive officers, who manage execution for a portfolio of programs.

In the past, similar duties and responsibilities now carried out by the SAF/AQ were performed by former offices in the Air Force Secretariat:

- Special Assistant for Research and Development – September 1950 to February 1955
- Assistant Secretary for Materiel – May 1951 to February 1964
- Assistant Secretary for Research and Development – March 1955 to May 1977
- Assistant Secretary for Research, Development, and Logistics (SAF/AL) – May 1977 to April 1987
- Assistant Secretary for Acquisition (SAF/AQ) – April 1987 to ~2018

By early 2018, the assistant secretary of the air force for acquisition (SAF/AQ) was renamed to the assistant secretary of the air force for acquisition, logistics and technology, while retaining the abbreviation SAF/AQ.

== Assistant secretaries of the air force (acquisition, technology, and logistics) ==
No.	Portrait	Name	Assumed office	Left office	President appointed by	Secretary served under
Assistant Secretary for Research, Development, and Logistics
1		John J. Martin	May 1977	May 1979	Jimmy Carter	John C. Stetson
2		Robert J. Hermann	July 1979	August 1981	Jimmy Carter	Hans Mark
3		Alton G. Keel, Jr.	July 30, 1981	1982	Ronald Reagan	Verne Orr
4		Thomas E. Cooper	January 1983	April 1987	Ronald Reagan	Verne Orr; Russell A. Rourke; Edward C. Aldridge, Jr.
Assistant Secretary for Acquisition
		Daniel S. Rak (Acting)	April 1987	October 1987	Ronald Reagan	Edward C. Aldridge, Jr.
5		John J. Welch, Jr.	October 1987	April 1992	Ronald Reagan	Edward C. Aldridge, Jr. Donald Rice
6		G. Kim Wincup	May 1992	December 1992	George H. W. Bush	Donald Rice
		Darleen A. Druyun (Acting)	January 1993	May 1994	William J. Clinton	Michael B. Donley
7		Clark G. Fiester	May 1994	April 17, 1995	William J. Clinton	Sheila Widnall
		Darleen A. Druyun (Acting)	April 17, 1995	January 26, 1996	William J. Clinton	Sheila Widnall
8		Arthur L. Money	January 26, 1996	February 1998	William J. Clinton	Sheila Widnall; F. Whitten Peters
9		Lawrence J. Delaney	April 29, 1999	January 20, 2001	William J. Clinton	F. Whitten Peters
10		Marvin R. Sambur	November 8, 2001	January 2005	George W. Bush	James G. Roche
11		Sue C. Payton	July 21, 2006	January 20, 2009	George W. Bush	Michael Wynne; Michael B. Donley
		David M. Van Buren(Acting)	January 20, 2009	March 2012	Barack Obama	Michael B. Donley
12		William A. LaPlante	February 12, 2014	November 18, 2015	Barack Obama	Deborah Lee James
		Richard W. Lombardi (Acting)	November 18, 2015	February 2016	Barack Obama	Deborah Lee James
		Darlene J. Costello (Acting)	February 11, 2016	March 9, 2018	Barack Obama	Deborah Lee James
		Darlene J. Costello (Acting)	February 11, 2016	March 9, 2018	Donald Trump	Heather Wilson
Assistant Secretary for Acquisition, Logistics and Technology
13		William B. Roper, Jr.	March 9, 2018	January 20, 2021	Donald Trump	Heather Wilson; Barbara Barrett
		Darlene J. Costello (Acting)	January 20, 2021	February 7, 2022	Joe Biden	John P. Roth; Frank Kendall III
14		Andrew Hunter	February 7, 2022	January 20, 2025	Joe Biden	Frank Kendall III
		Darlene J. Costello (Acting)	January 20, 2025	June 2, 2025	Donald Trump	Gary A. Ashworth (acting); Troy Meink
		William D. Bailey (Acting)	June 2, 2025	Present	Donald Trump	Troy Meink
