= Lawrence J. Delaney =

United States scientist and businessman

Lawrence Delaney
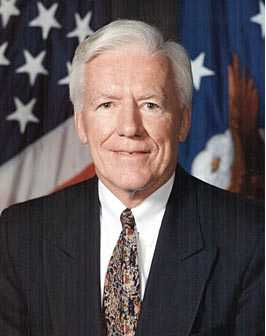

United States Secretary of the Air Force
- Acting
- In office January 21, 2001 – May 31, 2001
- President: George W. Bush
- Preceded by: F. Whitten Peters
- Succeeded by: Michael Wynne

United States Under Secretary of the Air Force
- Acting
- In office January 20, 2001 – April 15, 2001
- President: George W. Bush
- Preceded by: Carol A. DiBattiste
- Succeeded by: Peter B. Teets

Assistant Secretary of the Air Force for Acquisition
- In office April 29, 1999 – January 20, 2001
- President: Bill Clinton
- Preceded by: Arthur L. Money
- Succeeded by: Marvin R. Sambur

Personal details
- Born: Lawrence John Delaney; May 29, 1935 (age 91) Atlantic City, New Jersey, U.S.
- Education: Clarkson University (BS, MS); University of Pennsylvania (PhD)

Lawrence John Delaney (born May 29, 1935, in Atlantic City, New Jersey) is a United States scientist and businessman who served as Assistant Secretary of the Air Force (Acquisition) from 1999 to 2001, and briefly as Acting United States Secretary of the Air Force in 2001.

== Biography ==
Born in Atlantic City, New Jersey, Delaney attended Holy Spirit High School. Delaney was educated at Clarkson University, receiving a bachelor's degree in chemical engineering in 1957 and a master's degree in chemical engineering in 1958. He then studied at the University of Pennsylvania and received a Ph.D. in chemical engineering in 1961.

Delaney spent 1961 to 1962 working at the Institute for Defense Analyses in Washington, D.C., and then spent a year as a research fellow at the Fritz Haber Institute of the MPG in Berlin. In 1963, he joined The Aerospace Corporation in Los Angeles, working as director of its Propulsion Technology and Systems Study Group and of its Advanced Intercontinental Ballistic Missile Office until 1968. From 1968 to 1975, he worked for Martin Marietta in Washington, D.C., as director of advanced programs and then in Denver as director of its Navy Systems Division. From 1975 to 1981, he was director of Washington, D.C., operations for R&D Associates. He then worked for SAIC from 1981 to 1989, first as deputy sector manager for Military Sciences and Information Systems Sector, and then as manager of its Information Systems Group. He was then managing partner of Montgomery & Associates from 1989 to 1994; oversaw European operations for Braddock Dunn & McDonald in Berlin and as a group manager for IABG in Munich from 1994 to 1997; and founder and president of the Delaney Group Inc. in Washington, D.C., from 1997 to 1999.

In 1999, President of the United States Bill Clinton nominated Delaney to be Assistant Secretary of the Air Force (Acquisition). He held this position until 2001. He was also Acting United States Under Secretary of the Air Force in 2001, and Acting United States Secretary of the Air Force from January 21, 2001, until May 31, 2001.

Upon leaving government service in 2001, Delaney became president and CEO of Arete Associates in Sherman Oaks, Los Angeles. In 2003, he joined L-3 Communications / Titan Corp., becoming its president and CEO.

Government offices
Preceded by Arthur L. Money	Assistant Secretary of the Air Force for Acquisition; 1999–2001	Succeeded by Marvin R. Sambur
Preceded by Carol A. DiBattiste	United States Under Secretary of the Air Force; Acting; 2001	Succeeded by Peter B. Teets
Preceded by F. Whitten Peters	United States Secretary of the Air Force; Acting; 2001	Succeeded by James G. Roche
