= Will Roper =

American physicist

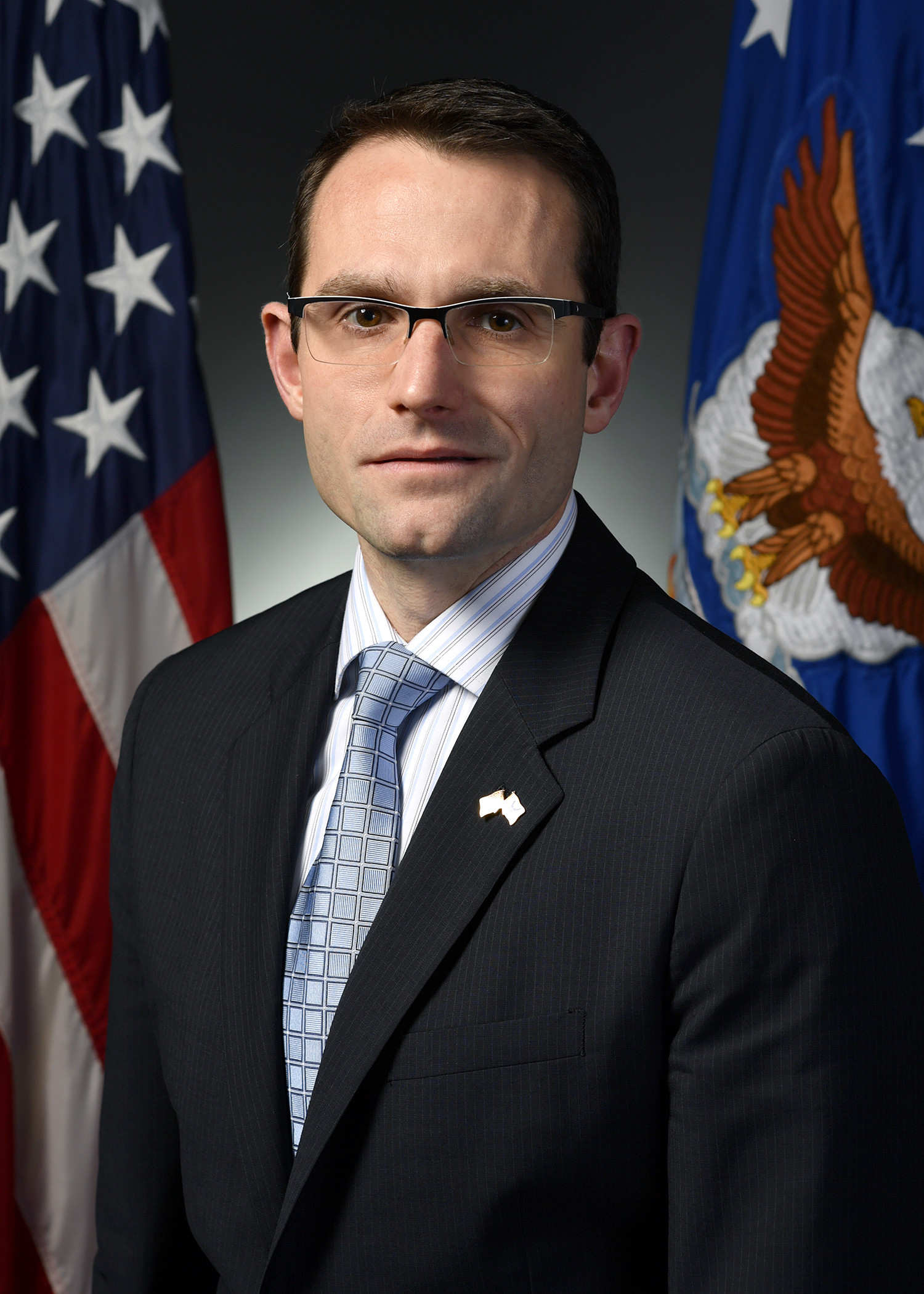
- Official portrait, 2019

13th Assistant Secretary of the Air Force (Acquisition, Technology and Logistics)
- In office March 9, 2018 – January 20, 2021
- President: Donald Trump
- Preceded by: William A. LaPlante
- Succeeded by: Andrew P. Hunter

Director of the Strategic Capabilities Office
- In office August 2012 – February 2018
- President: Barack Obama; Donald Trump
- Preceded by: Position established
- Succeeded by: Chris Shank

Personal details
- Born: William B. Roper Jr.
- Education: Georgia Institute of Technology (BS, MS); Oxford University (PhD)
- Website: Air Force biography

William B. Roper Jr. is an American physicist and foreign policy strategist who served as the 13th Assistant Secretary of the Air Force for Acquisition, Technology and Logistics, overseeing procurement for the U.S. Air Force and Space Force from 2018 to 2021. Before taking office he served elsewhere within the Department of Defense as founder and director of the Strategic Capabilities Office, and prior as Ballistic Missile Defense System Architect at the Missile Defense Agency. He was also a member of the 2018 National Defense Strategy steering group. He is currently the CEO at Istari, as well as serving as senior advisor at McKinsey and Co., and teaching at Georgia Tech.

== Education ==
Roper earned a Bachelor of Science in physics and mathematics from Georgia Tech in 1998. He returned to Georgia Tech to earn Master of Physics degree the following year, graduating as a presidential scholar summa cum laude in 2002.

In 2002 Roper was selected as a Rhodes Scholar, and began study at University College, Oxford for a Doctoral program in mathematics with a focus on String Theory and quantum mechanics. During his doctoral program, he was selected for a National Defense Science and Engineering Fellowship. His doctoral supervisor was John Wheater, and he defended his dissertation "Boundary States in Conformal Field Theories on the Annulus” in July 2009.

While heading the Strategic Capabilities Office, Roper studied under Andrew Marshall, founder and director of the Department of Defense's Office of Net Assessment from 1973 to 2015.

== Career ==
=== Missile Defense Agency ===
From January 2006 to May 2012, Roper joined as technical staff at the MIT Lincoln Lab in Bedford, Massachusetts, attached to the Missile Defense Agency. In 2009 he was made part of the Missile Defense Advisory Committee within the Office of the Secretary of Defense, serving as a missile defense advisor to the Under Secretary of Defense for Acquisition, Technology and Logistics. He later became acting Ballistic Missile Defense System Architect at MDA from 2010 to 2012 while a part of Lincoln Lab. While in that role, he developed 11 new systems, including the current European Defense architecture, advanced drones, and several other classified programs.

=== Strategic Capabilities Office ===
From August 2012 to February 2018, Roper was the founder and director of the Strategic Capabilities Office within the Office of the Secretary of Defense. The office he created imagined new and "often unexpected and game-changing" uses for existing and aging government and commercial systems. When he was discovered and hired by Secretary of Defense Ash Carter, the program he was slated to lead was conceived as a way to extend the shelf-life of technology and systems which were falling behind the cutting edge, but Roper saw the potential of the material available to the office, and led the program in a different direction, creating a skunkworks for future warfare which innovated radically new ideas from disused and surplus systems. Under his tenure, the office achieved numerous success and accolades, and grew from an annual budget of $50 million to more than $1.5 billion as of 2018. He led the office to tackle new and diverse concepts including hypervelocity artillery, multi-purpose missiles, autonomous fast-boats, smartphone-navigating weapons, big-data-enabled sensing, 3D-printed systems, standoff arsenal planes, fighter avatars, missile defeating hypervelocity rifles, and fighter-dispersed swarming micro-drones which formed the world's then-largest swarm of 103 systems. Ideas fomented under his tenure are now seeing widespread implementation across the Department of Defense.

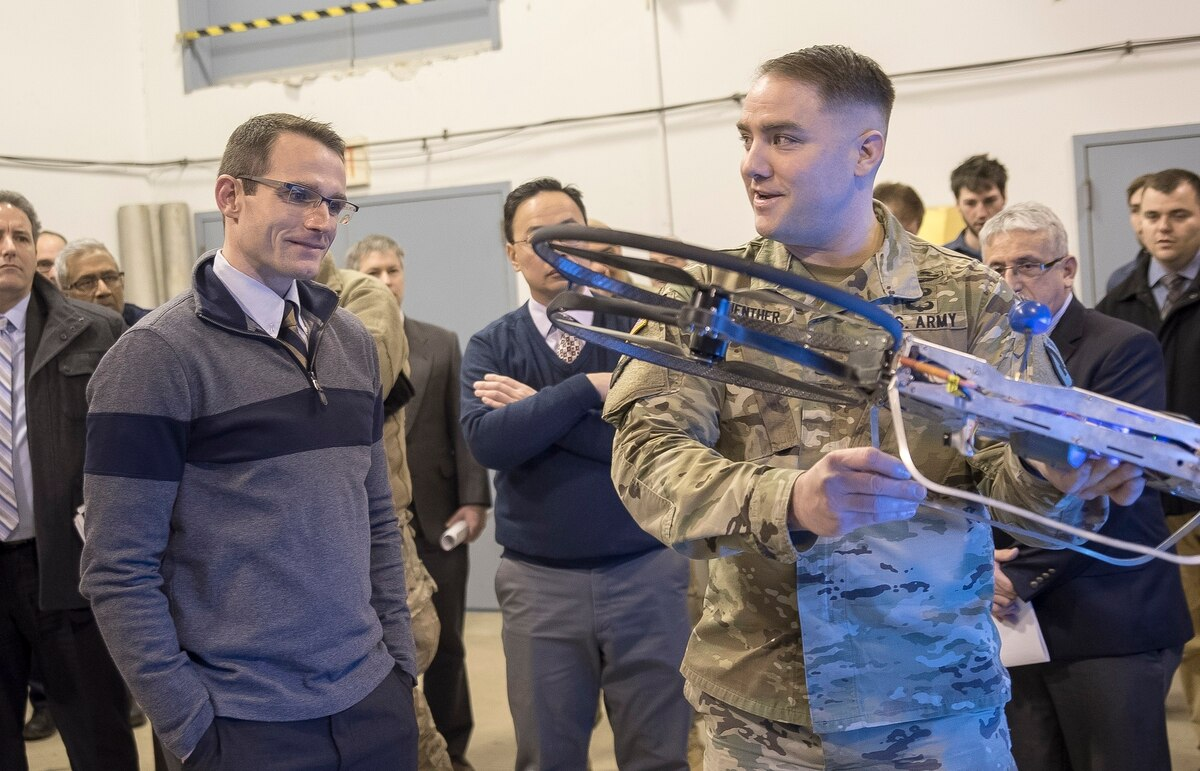
Roper reviewing a Joint Tactical Aerial Resupply Vehicle concept at Aberdeen Proving Ground in 2017.

One notable failure of the program under Roper's leadership came when employees at Google demanded the company abandon the Algorithmic Warfare Cross-Function Team working on artificial intelligence solutions to information ingestion issues, better known as Project Maven because of objections to the militarization of technology. Roper then a leading position on addressing the issue, serving on the Cloud Executive Steering Group and Defense Modernization Team.

Roper left the program when he was promoted to Assistant Secretary. He was briefly succeeded by Chris Shank before a fight over the future scope and scale of the program between Capitol Hill and the Pentagon led to a reshuffling of the entire office, a move led by then-Acting Secretary of Defense Patrick Shanahan which Roper briefly attempted to resist because of his skepticism of Shanahan's goals for the scalability of the office.

=== Assistant Secretary of the Air Force ===
In 2018, Roper was tapped to become the Assistant Secretary of the Air Force (Acquisition, Technology, & Logistics) in charge of $40 billion and 465 discrete programs. Roper's tenure with the Department of Defense has been seen by many as transformative, and he has gained a reputation for aggressive, unconventional, forward looking approaches.

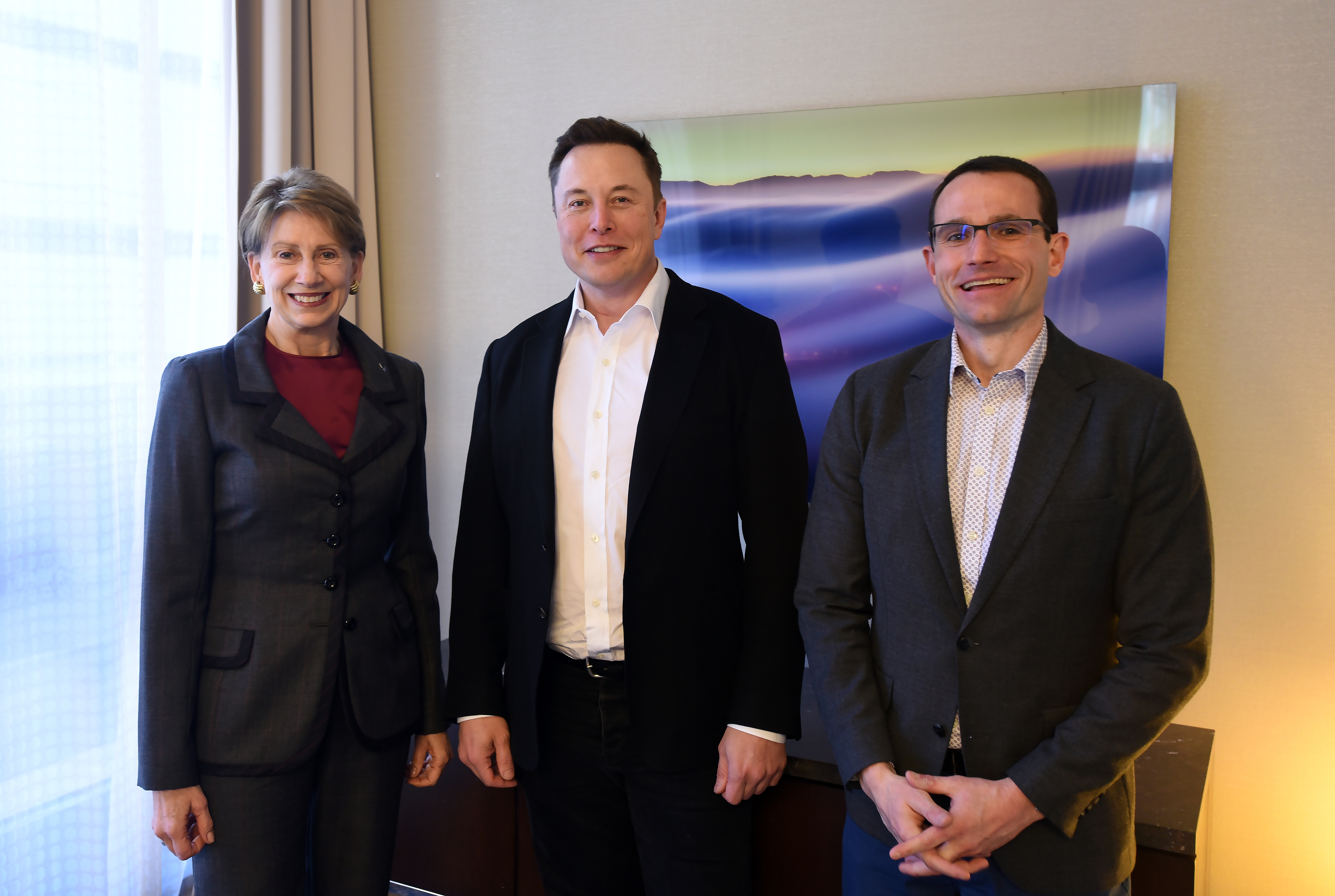
Roper with Secretary of the Air Force Barbara Barrett and Elon Musk

A primary goal for Roper in his tenure with the Air Force was the acceleration of the development and acquisition process. He has advocated the use of military investment funds to foster disruptive innovation through immediate funding to a growing pool of small contractors who rely on guaranteed cash to make concepts or programs feasible. For Roper, the main goal is "stealing time back from our adversaries." He argues that globalization means that the old Cold War ways of domestic government-led innovation are obsolete, replaced by a commercial driven future where everyone has access to the same resources and technological approaches, but must move quickly to capture the fleeting first-mover advantage - and then continually repeat the process as the window of advantage he believes has been permanently shortened.

He has pioneered the creation of a quick moving Air Force contracting team designed for small capital and startups called AFVentures, and events called "Pitch Bowls", an idea borrowed from Silicon Valley startups pitches to venture capital. Through them he is attempting to eliminate obstacles of lengthy DoD contracting and award processes which hinder small and unfunded projects through the use of same day funding awards via PayPal, starting at $158,000. On an ongoing basis the Air Force will then make further installment payments over time, in an attempt to deliver confidence in liquidity to outside stakeholders. He has also worked with new prime contractors at a larger scale, particularly in continuing to foster competition which can benefit the Air Force between National Security Space Launch newcomer SpaceX and their more well established competitor United Launch Alliance, a partnership between industry giants Lockheed Martin Space and Boeing Defense, Space & Security. That competition has raised eyebrows in an industry which has become heavily consolidated in recent years, as the Air Force, National Reconnaissance Office, Missile Defense Agency and fledgling Space Development Agency all describe a need for significant launch capacity in coming years. Roper also expressed interest in one of SpaceX's other products, the Starlink satellite internet constellation as a platform for the SDA.

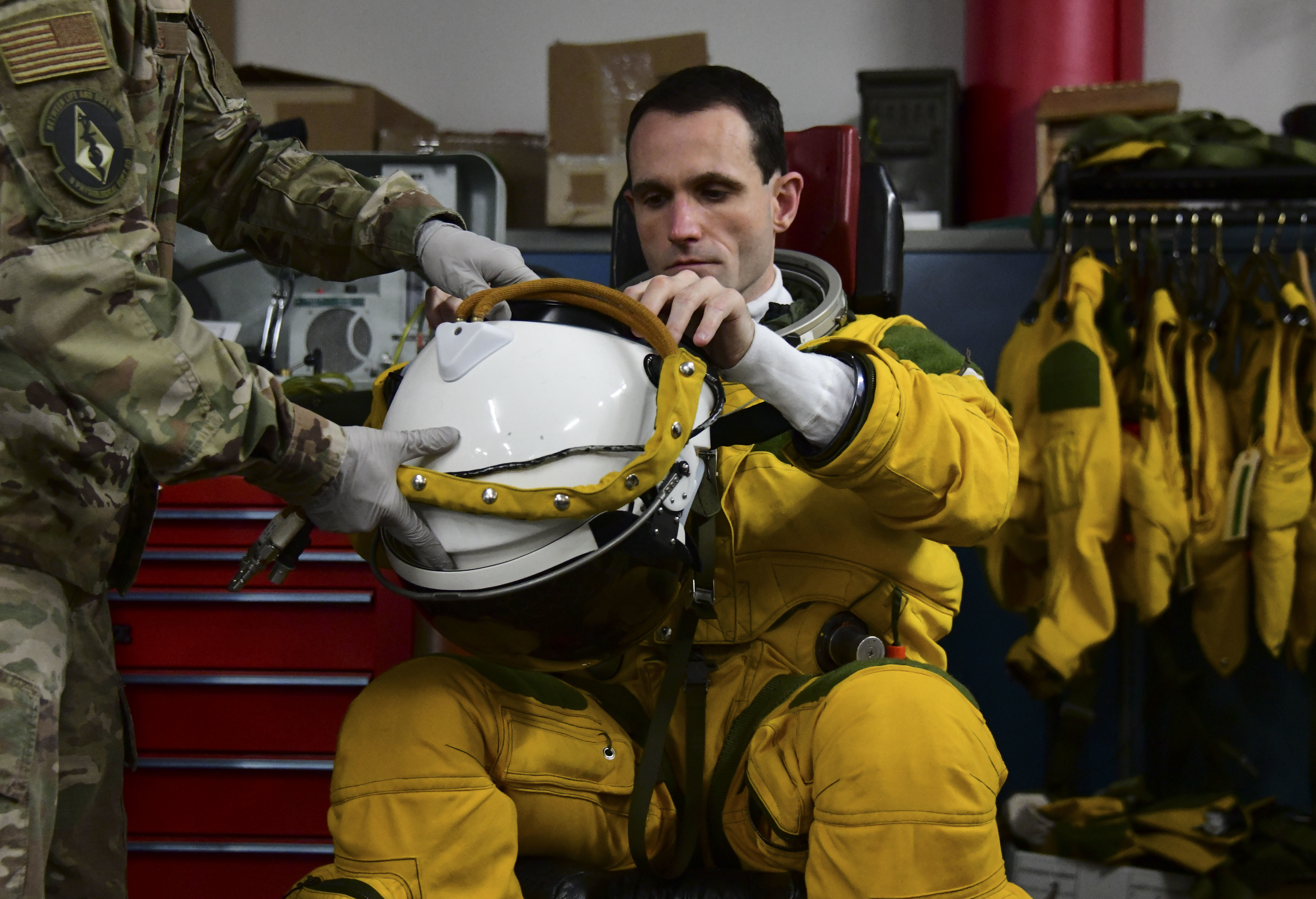
Roper donning a pressurized flight suit for a flight in the U-2 Dragon Lady

Roper has attempted to turn the failures and delays of the long-beleaguered KC-46 Pegasus aerial refueling tanker project into an advantage by weaving fully autonomous operation capabilities into its redesign. He prioritized development of more effective multi-domain operation tools like Joint All Domain Command and Control (JADC2) and replacing JSTARS with the Advanced Battle Management System. He has also argued for the utility of disaggregated Low Earth Orbit constellations as a way to exploit more applications for space based technology beyond only high orbit or deep space craft. Roper is also a major proponent of hypersonic weapons and has attempted to bolster their development in the Air Force, fielding the more ambitious but "superior" AGM-183A Air-launched Rapid Response Weapon (ARRW) over its conventional rival, and demanding innovative manufacturing including use of 3D printing from parts suppliers, accelerating prototyping.

In the wake of the ongoing COVID-19 pandemic, Roper has helped facilitate the use of the Defense Production Act with industry partners, supporting the defense industrial base in the pandemic-led recession and speeding up the production of life-saving medical equipment.

Since the creation of the United States Space Force in December 2019, Roper has assumed a role in two highly classified programs within the service to build so-called e-satellites, "a Toyota-like satellite" designed be a radically simplified, reliable, hard-wearing deployable craft eschewing traditional requirements like cleanrooms and expensive shielding, designed and engineered entirely within a digital environment before being produced in volume at low cost.

During the Biden administration transition, Roper made his case to remain in his position despite being a political appointee in the Trump administration. In a Zoom conference with reporters, he expressed his reservations at times with administration policy, but argued he was driven to continue by his deep concerns about a continued lack of awareness of China's military capabilities throughout the Pentagon saying "I don't think there is true cognizance and realization that we can lose — and that on paper, we're likely to lose" "The scale factors are against us in terms of GDP and population and STEM talent, every single factor is against. And the only way to win against the Goliath of that scale, is to have greater agility." He also acknowledged that whether or not he was retained in the Biden administration, his next job will focus on keeping the U.S. a step ahead of China, saying "China is going to be here for the long term, past any single administration, they have a plan to knock us off the top" continuing "that is why I came into defense, that is why I work so hard at this." The Biden administration did not retain Roper, and he resigned prior to the inauguration. In October 2022, the Biden administration brought Roper back on as an innovation advisor on the Defense Innovation Board.

=== National defense strategist ===
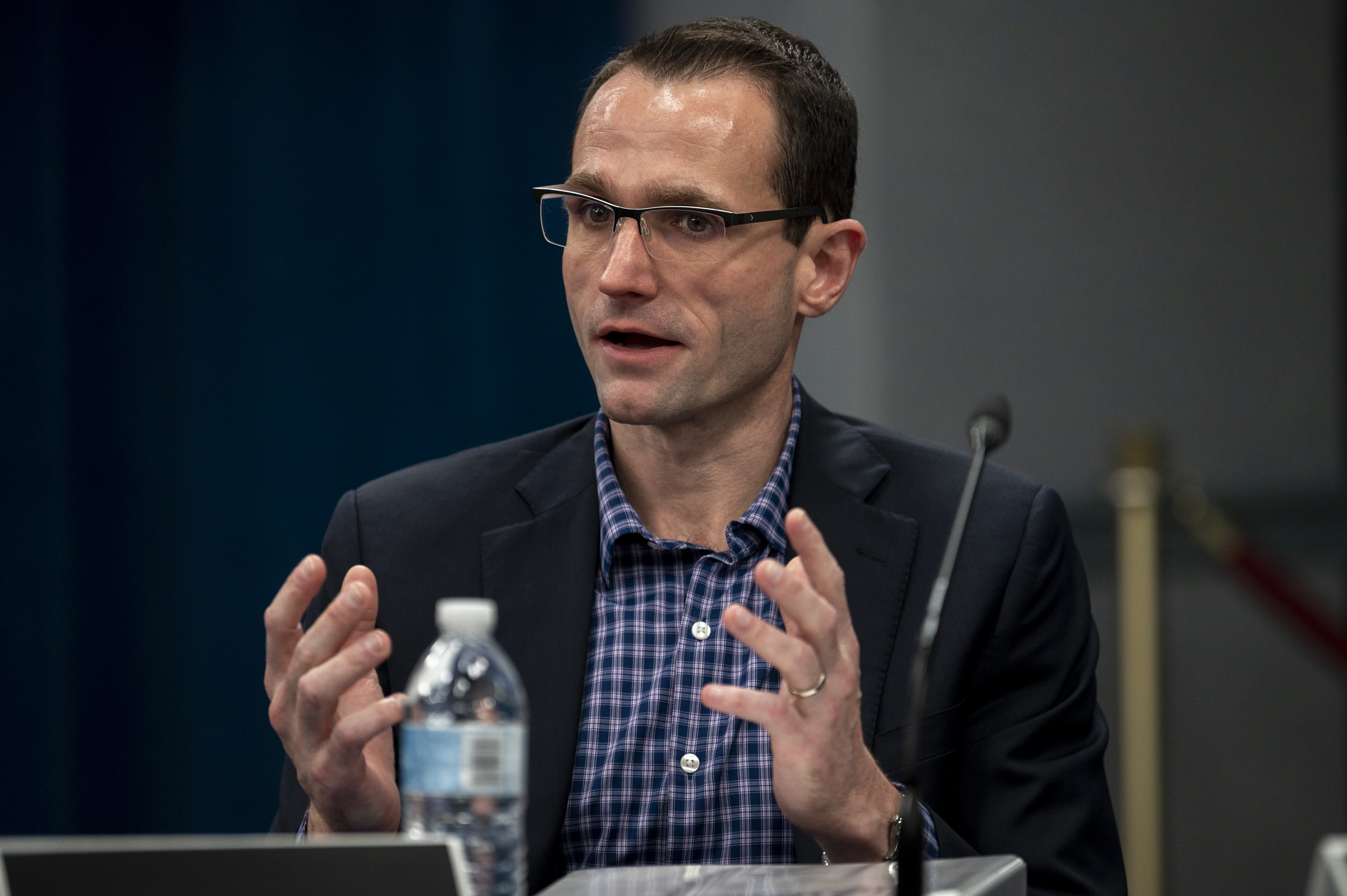
Roper speaks at the Defense Innovation Board in 2022

In 2018 Roper was appointed to the Department of Defense's 2018 National Defense Strategy steering group, helping to write the penultimate strategic assessment of U.S. posture and priorities. It is one of the first major U.S. strategy documents to accept plainly the return of great power competition. Following its publication, Roper told the U.S.-China Economic and Security Review Commission that he views competition with China as "one of the seminal challenges that we’re going to face in this century."

== Personal life ==
Roper resides just outside Washington, D.C. in Alexandria, Virginia. He is married and has a young daughter.

== Honors and awards ==
- Council on Foreign Relations Stephen M. Kellen Term Member Program, 2014 - 2019.
- Department of Defense Medal for Distinguished Public Service.
- Secretary of Defense Award for Excellence - Asia Pacific Rebalance.
- Under Secretary of Defense for Acquisition, Technology & Logistics Award for Excellence - Innovation.
- Missile Defense Agency Contractor Employee of the Year.
- Missile Defense Agency Award for Innovation.
- Missile Defense Agency Award for Technology - UAV's.
- DoD National Defense Science and Engineering Fellowship Selectee.
- Rhodes Scholarship.
- Truman Scholarship.
- Coca-Cola Scholarship.
- Georgia Tech Presidential Fellow.

== Notable works ==
- There is No Spoon: _The New Digital Acquisition Reality. Will Roper, October 7, 2020.

== See also ==
- Assistant Secretary of the Air Force (Acquisition, Technology and Logistics)
- Andrew Marshall
