= Widnall =

Widnall is a surname. Notable people with the surname include:

- Sheila Widnall (born 1938), American aerospace researcher and Institute Professor at the Massachusetts Institute of Technology
- William B. Widnall (1906–1983), member of the United States House of Representatives for 24 years representing the 7th district of New Jersey
