= Andrew P. Hunter =

American defense official

Andrew Hunter
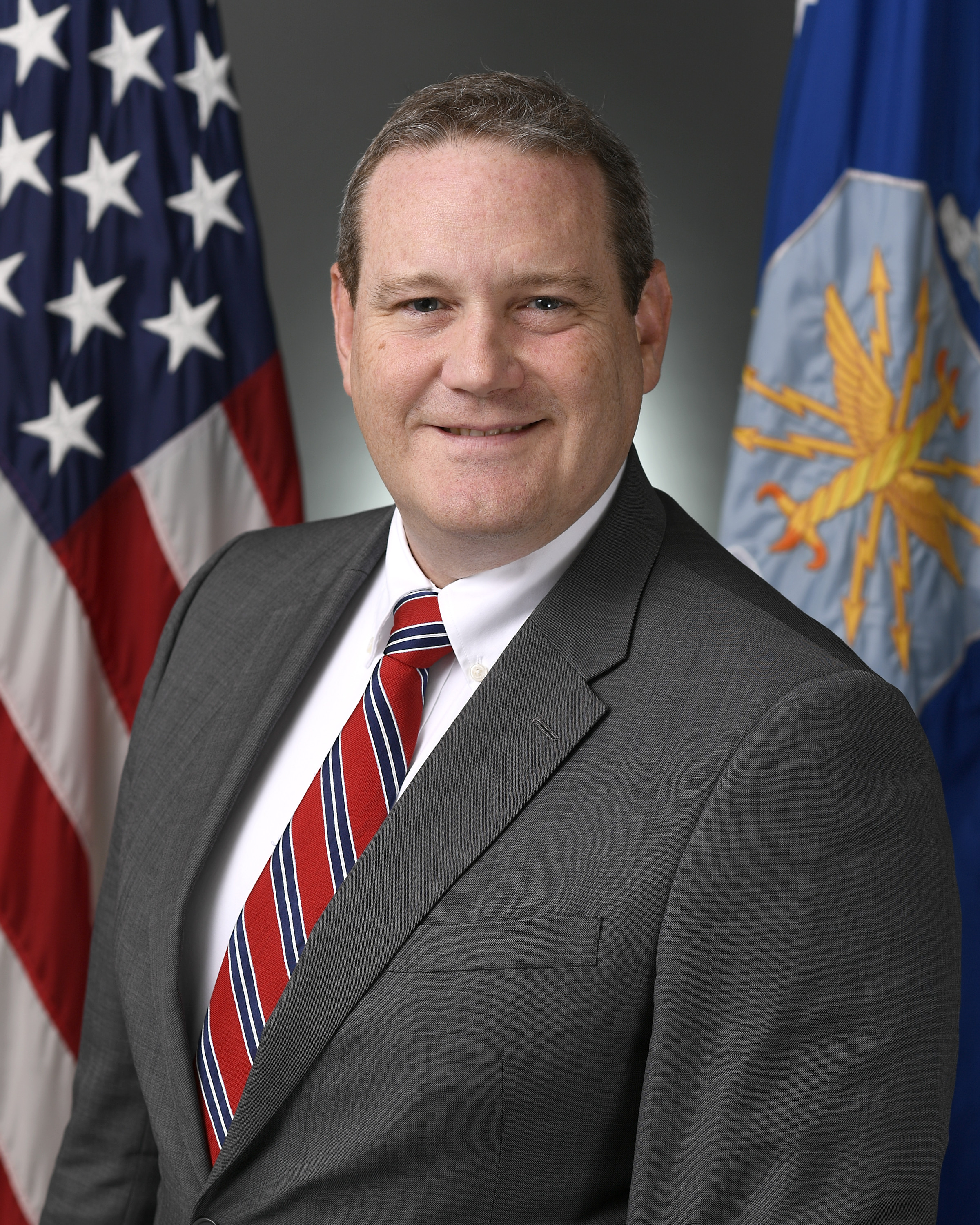

Assistant Secretary of the Air Force for Acquisition, Technology and Logistics
- In office February 7, 2022 – January 20, 2025
- President: Joe Biden
- Preceded by: Will Roper

Personal details
- Born: Andrew Philip Hunter; January 19, 1972 (age 53)
- Spouse: Karen Kleiber
- Children: Margaret and Benjamin
- Education: Harvard University (AB); Johns Hopkins University (MA)

Andrew Philip Hunter is an American defense official and policy analyst who served as the 14th and current assistant secretary of the Air Force for acquisition, technology and logistics (SAF/AQ). Prior to becoming an Air Force Assistant Secretary, he was the director of the defense industrial initiatives group at the Center for Strategic and International Studies. Before joining CSIS, Hunter spent 17 years as a staffer in the U.S. House of Representatives and 3 years as a senior procurement official at the Department of Defense during the Obama administration.

== Education ==
Hunter earned a Bachelor of Arts degree in social studies from Harvard University in 1994 and a Master of Arts in applied economics from Johns Hopkins University in 2001.

== Career ==
From 1994 to 2005, he served in a variety of staff positions in the United States House of Representatives, including as a staffer on appropriations for Representative Norm Dicks, as legislative assistant on military issues, and later legislative director for Representative John Spratt. He also served as a staffer for the Select Committee on U.S. National Security, whose work comprised the Cox Report on Chinese espionage and covert operations. From 2005 to 2011, Hunter was a professional staff member of the House Armed Services Committee, where he was a proponent of procurement reform and accelerating technological innovation in the U.S. military.

From 2011 to November 2014, Hunter served as a senior executive in the Department of Defense. He was first appointed as director of the Joint Rapid Acquisition Cell, tasked with fielding solutions to immediate operational needs, and later led the Warfighter Senior Integration Group, examining the efficacy of combat support efforts. From 2011 to 2012, he served as chief of staff to Ash Carter and Frank Kendall III, supporting each during their respective terms as undersecretary of defense for acquisition, technology and logistics. Hunter served on the Biden transition team and was involved in the transition of the Department of Defense between administrations in late-2020.

Hunter has also written for several defense industry and mainstream publications, including an article for Breaking Defense where he dissented from popular criticism of Congress' Overseas Contingency Operations appropriations, which he argued was unfairly maligned by those who describe it as a slush fund.

=== Biden administration ===
On July 16, 2021, the White House announced that President Biden intended to nominate Hunter to be assistant secretary of the Air Force for Acquisition, Technology and Logistics.

He was confirmed by the U.S. Senate, which made Hunter the Department of the Air Force’s top acquisition executive, overseeing all United States Air Force and Space Force research, development and acquisition programs. He was sworn in on February 7, 2022. He immediately began performing the duties of the Under Secretary of Defense for Acquisition and Sustainment until William A. LaPlante was sworn in on April 15, 2022. With the swearing in of Frank Calvelli as the Assistant Secretary of the Air Force for Space Acquisition and Integration on May 5, 2022, Hunter relinquished control of the Space Force acquisition portfolio as mandated by Congress in the 2020 National Defense Authorization Act.
