= Marvin R. Sambur =

American engineer and businessman (born 1946)

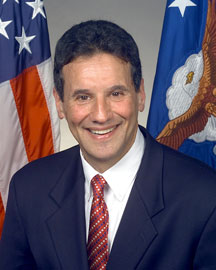
- Marvin R. Sambur in c. 2001
- Born: March 31, 1946 (age 80); Brooklyn, New York, U.S.
- Education: Massachusetts Institute of Technology; City College of New York
- Scientific career
- Fields: Electrical engineering
- Workplaces: ITT Inc.
- Doctoral advisor: Kenneth N. Stevens

Marvin Robert Sambur (born March 31, 1946) is an American engineer and businessman who served as Assistant Secretary of the Air Force (Acquisition) from 2001 to 2005.

Sambur was educated at the City College of New York, receiving his B.S. in electrical engineering in 1968. He then joined the technical staff of Bell Labs in Murray Hill, New Jersey, while continuing his education. He received an M.S. in electrical engineering from the Massachusetts Institute of Technology in 1969 and a Ph.D. in electrical engineering from MIT in 1972.

Sambur worked at Bell Labs until 1977, when he joined ITT Defense Communications in Nutley, New Jersey, as senior vice president. In 1988, he moved to Easton, Pennsylvania, to become president and general manager of the ITT's Electron Technology division. He held that position until 1991, when he became president and general manager of ITT's Aerospace/Communications division in Fort Wayne, Indiana. Finally, in 1998, he became president and CEO of ITT Defense in McLean, Virginia.

In 2001, President of the United States George W. Bush nominated Sambur to be Assistant Secretary of the Air Force (Acquisition). He held the office until January 2005.

After leaving government service, Sambur co-founded Raptors Consulting Group, based in Potomac, Maryland. He also joined the faculty of the A. James Clark School of Engineering.

Sambur had been a resident of Denville Township, New Jersey.

== Notes ==
Government offices
Preceded by Lawrence J. Delaney	Assistant Secretary of the Air Force (Acquisition); 2001 – January 2005	Succeeded by Sue C. Payton
