= Clark G. Fiester =

American businessman who served as Assistant Secretary of the Air Force (Acquisition)

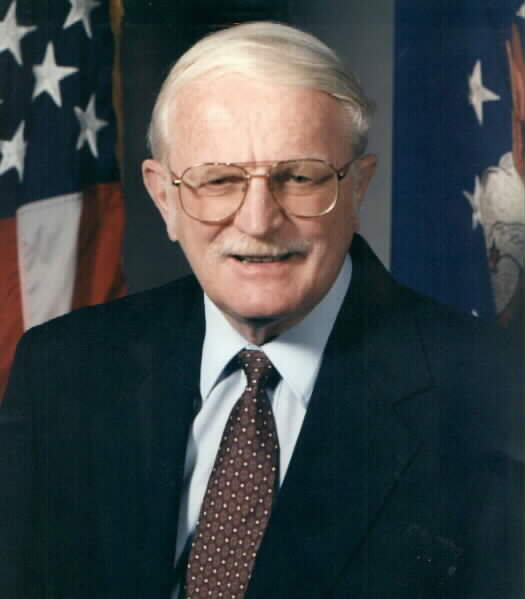

Assistant Secretary of the Air Force (Acquisition)
- In office May 1994 – April 17, 1995
- President: Bill Clinton
- Preceded by: Darleen A. Druyun (Acting)
- Succeeded by: Darleen A. Druyun (Acting)

Personal details
- Born: Clark George Fiester; January 25, 1934
- Died: April 17, 1995 (aged 61) Alexander City, Alabama, U.S.
- Education: Pennsylvania State University (B.Sc.); Stanford University (M.Sc.)

Clark George Fiester (January 25, 1934 – April 17, 1995) was an American businessman who served as Assistant Secretary of the Air Force (Acquisition) from 1993 until his death in a plane crash in 1995.

== Biography ==
Clark G. Fiester was born on January 25, 1934. He was educated at Pennsylvania State University (B.S.) and Stanford University (M.S.). He later attended a six-week Advanced Management Program at Harvard Business School. He served in the United States Air Force and became a captain.

In 1957, Fiester joined GTE Government Systems Corp. (which would be acquired by General Dynamics in 1999), a company that designed and developed information security, electro-optics, and automated airport weather stations. Fiester was associated with GTE Government Systems Corp. for his entire career, eventually becoming a group vice president and general manager.

On November 1, 1993, President of the United States Bill Clinton nominated Fiester to be Assistant Secretary of the Air Force (Acquisition), and he subsequently held office until his death. Fiester had been a long-time friend of United States Secretary of Defense William Perry, the two having met as undergraduates at Penn State.

Fiester died in a plane crash near Alexander City, Alabama, on April 17, 1995. He had been flying on an Air Force Learjet 35 from Andrews Air Force Base to Randolph Air Force Base when the crash occurred. Also killed in the crash were Colonel Jack Clark II, Fiester's military deputy; Major General Glenn A. Profitt II; and five other members of the Air Force. President Clinton granted a presidential waiver to allow Fiester to be buried in Arlington National Cemetery.

Government offices
Preceded by Darleen A. Druyun (Acting)	Assistant Secretary of the Air Force (Acquisition); 1993–1995	Succeeded by Darleen A. Druyun (Acting)
