= Lucian Niemeyer =

American government official

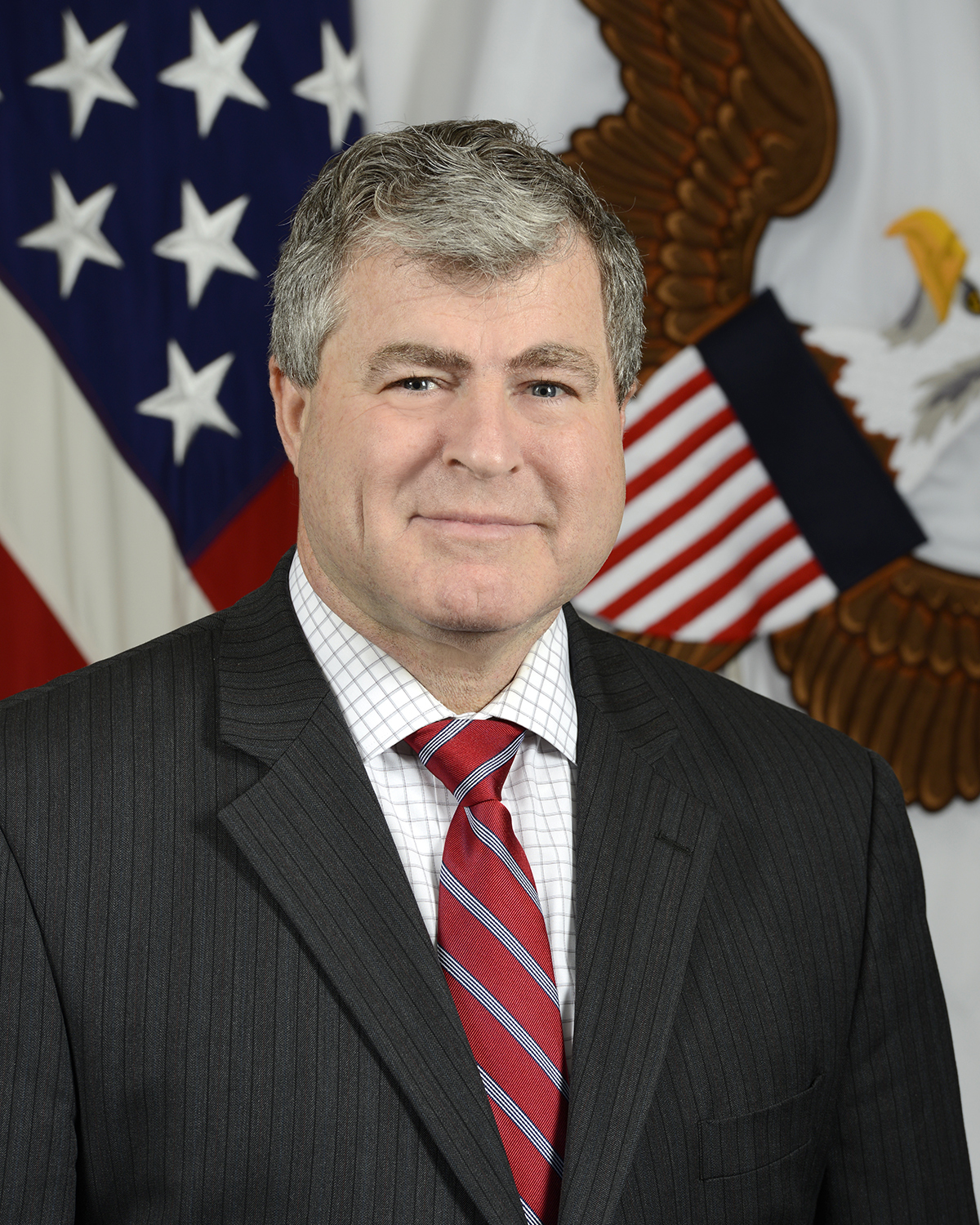

Assistant Secretary of Defense for Energy, Installations, and Environment
- In office August 2, 2017 – January 20, 2021
- President: Donald Trump
- Preceded by: John Conger (acting)
- Succeeded by: Brendan Owens

Personal details
- Born: Lucian Lenzner Niemeyer
- Education: University of Notre Dame; George Washington University; Naval War College

Military service
- Branch/service: United States Air Force
- Rank: Lieutenant colonel

Lucian Lenzner Niemeyer is an American consultant and government official who served as Assistant Secretary of Defense for Energy, Installations and Environment from 2017 to 2021. He was nominated for the position by President Donald Trump in June 2017 and was confirmed by the United States Senate on August 1, 2017, by voice vote. On June 26, 2019, after a reorganization within the Office of the Secretary of Defense, Niemeyer became Acting Assistant Secretary of the Navy for Energy, Installations and Environment.

== Early life and education ==
Raised in Aston, Pennsylvania, Niemeyer is a 1987 graduate of the University of Notre Dame with a Bachelor of Architecture degree.

== Military career ==
Niemeyer is a retired United States Air Force officer with fifteen years of active service and five years in the Air National Guard.

== Civilian career ==
Prior to assuming his current role, Niemeyer served as president of the Niemeyer Group, where he advised public and private entities on national defense issues. He was previously a staff member of the United States Senate Committee on Armed Services, where he managed legislative authorizations for military installations and energy and environmental programs, and recommended congressional support for construction, repair, and modernization of military facilities.

He served as Assistant Secretary of Defense for Energy, Installations and Environment from 2017 to 2021. He was nominated for the position by President Donald Trump in June 2017 and was confirmed by the United States Senate on August 1, 2017, by voice vote. On June 26, 2019, after a reorganization within the Office of the Secretary of Defense, Niemeyer became Acting Assistant Secretary of the Navy for Energy, Installations and Environment.
