= William A. LaPlante =

American nonprofit executive and government official

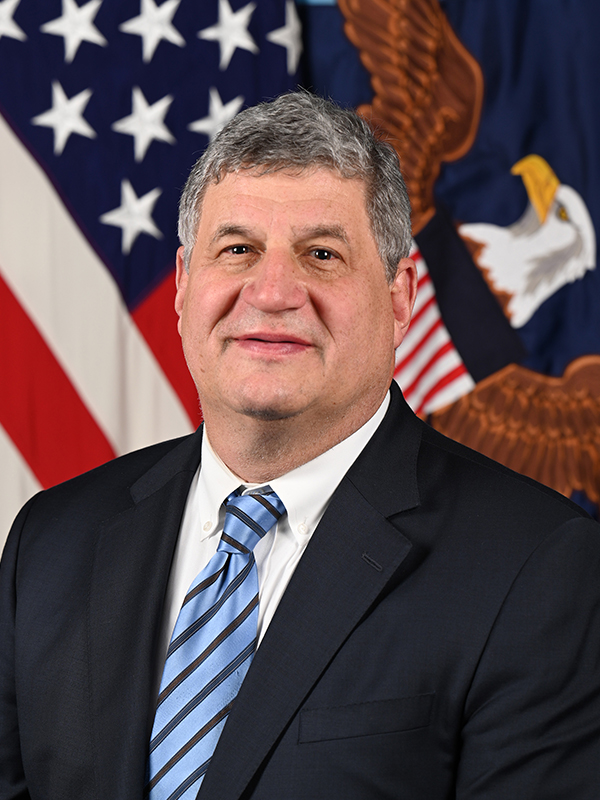

Under Secretary of Defense for Acquisition and Sustainment
- In office April 15, 2022 – January 20, 2025
- President: Joe Biden
- Preceded by: Ellen Lord
- Succeeded by: Michael P. Duffey

Assistant Secretary of the Air Force (Acquisition, Technology and Logistics)
- In office February 12, 2014 – November 18, 2015
- President: Barack Obama
- Preceded by: Sue C. Payton
- Succeeded by: Will Roper

Personal details
- Education: University of Illinois (BS); Johns Hopkins University (MS); Catholic University (PhD)

William A. LaPlante is an American non-profit executive and government official who previously served as the Under Secretary of Defense for Acquisition and Sustainment in the Biden Administration. He was previously the CEO of Draper Laboratory.

== Education ==
LaPlante holds a doctorate in mechanical engineering from the Catholic University of America, a master's degree in applied physics from The Johns Hopkins University, and a bachelor's degree in engineering physics from the University of Illinois.

== Career ==
LaPlante started his career at Applied Physics Laboratory working on various capping off 26 years as the Department Head for Global Engagement In 2011, he joined MITRE as the Missile Defense Portfolio Director.

LaPlante served as the principal deputy assistant secretary of the Air Force for acquisition, technology, and logistics in 2013. Later in 2014, he was confirmed by the Senate as the Assistant Secretary of the Air Force (Acquisition, Technology and Logistics)

Leaving his position in 2015, LaPlante rejoined MITRE as the senior vice president and general manager for National Security.

In September 2020, LaPlante was announced as the CEO of Draper Laboratory.

On November 30, 2021, LaPlante was nominated to become the Defense Department's top procurement official. He was confirmed by the Senate on April 7, 2022.

After leaving the Biden Administration, LaPlante rejoined the board of trustees at The Aerospace Corporation.
