= Thomas E. Cooper =

United States scientist and businessman

Assistant Secretary of the Air Force (Acquisition)
- In office January 1983 – April 1987
- President: Ronald Reagan
- Preceded by: Alton G. Keel Jr.
- Succeeded by: Daniel S. Rak (Acting)

Personal details
- Born: Thomas E. Cooper; 31 May 1943 (age 83)
- Education: University of California, Berkeley (B.S., M.S., PhD)

Thomas Edward Cooper (born 1943) is an American scientist and businessman who served as Assistant Secretary of the Air Force (Acquisition) from 1983 to 1987.

== Biography ==
Thomas E. Cooper was born on May 31, 1943. He was educated at the University of California, Berkeley, receiving a B.S. in 1966, an M.S. in 1968, and a Ph.D. in 1970.

After completing his doctorate, in 1970 Cooper worked briefly as a consultant for the Lawrence Radiation Laboratory, and then spent 1970 to 1975 as an associate professor of mechanical engineering at the Naval Postgraduate School. In 1976, he joined the professional staff of the United States House Committee on Armed Services, working there until 1982.

On December 15, 1982, President of the United States Ronald Reagan nominated Cooper to be Assistant Secretary of the Air Force (Research, Development, and Logistics). Cooper subsequently held this office until 1987, with the title of the office changing to Assistant Secretary of the Air Force (Acquisition) during the course of his time in office.

Upon leaving government service in 1987, Cooper joined General Electric as an executive. He retired as GE Aviation's head of Washington, D.C. operations in 2008.

== Links ==
- Official Biography

Government offices
Preceded by Alton G. Keel Jr.	Assistant Secretary of the Air Force (Acquisition); 1983 – 1987	Succeeded by Daniel S. Rak (Acting)
