= John Joseph Martin =

American mechanical engineer

Assistant Secretary of the Air Force (Acquisition)
- In office May 1977 – May 1979
- President: Jimmy Carter
- Succeeded by: Robert J. Hermann

Personal details
- Born: John Joseph Martin; October 19, 1922
- Died: August 7, 1997 (aged 74)
- Education: Purdue University (Ph.D.)

John Joseph Martin (October 19, 1922 – August 7, 1997 ) was educated as a mechanical engineer, receiving a Ph.D. from Purdue University in 1951. He joined North American Aviation in 1951 and moved to the Bendix Corporation in 1953. In 1960, he joined the Institute for Defense Analyses. While on sabbatical at the Royal Aircraft Establishment in Farnborough, Hampshire, Martin wrote "Atmospheric Reentry". This book became the first and arguably the best in the open literature about designing reentry vehicles. Sir Michael James Lighthill, who was Martin's host at the Royal Aircraft Establishment, wrote the foreword to Martin's book. In 1969, Martin served as a science advisor to the US President. During 1973-1974 Martin served as an Associate Deputy Director at the Central Intelligence Agency and later as Deputy Assistant Secretary of the US Air Force. In 1984, Martin became an Associate Administrator at NASA.

== Works ==
- Martin, John J. (1966). Atmospheric Reentry - An Introduction to Its Science and Engineering. Old Tappan, NJ: Prentice-Hall.
