= Assistant Secretary of Defense for Energy, Installations, and Environment =

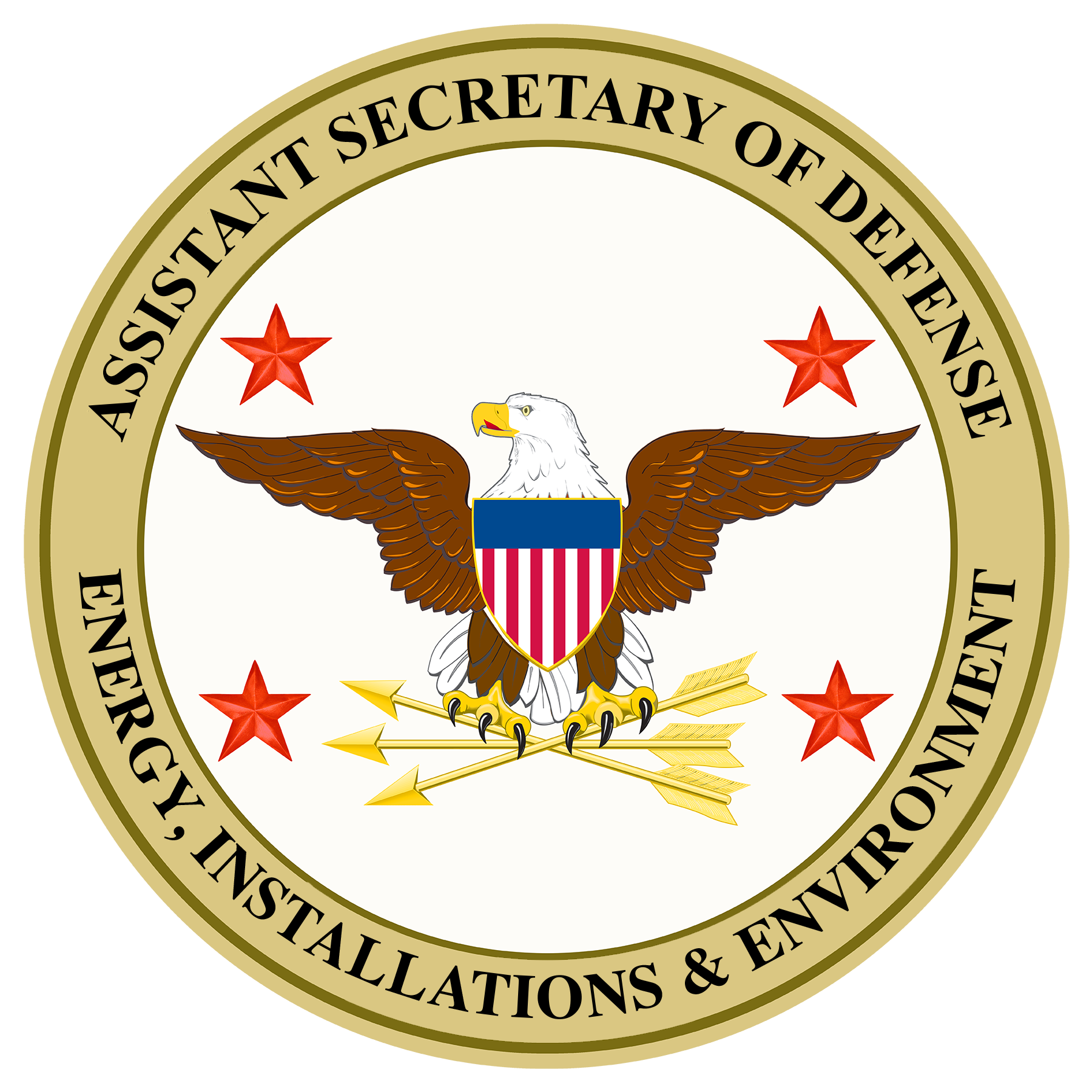
- Seal of the assistant secretary of defense for energy, installations, and environment

- Flag of an assistant secretary of defense

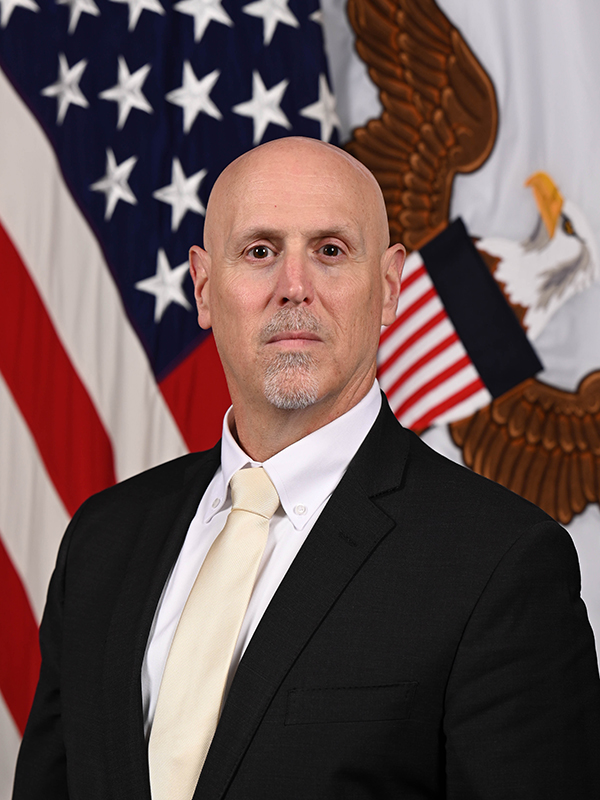
- Incumbent; Dale R. Marks since June 10, 2025
- Office of the Secretary of Defense
- Style: The Honorable (formal address in writing)
- Reports to: Under Secretary of Defense for Acquisition and Sustainment
- Appointer: The president with the advice and consent of the Senate
- Term length: No fixed term
- Formation: February 10, 2022
- Website: Official website

The assistant secretary of defense for energy, installations, and environment (ASD(EI&E)), concurrently the chief sustainability officer, and formerly known as the deputy under secretary of defense for installations and environment (DUSD(I&E)), provides management and oversight of military installations worldwide and manages environmental, safety, and occupational health programs for the Department of Defense (DoD). DoD's installations cover some 29,000,000 acres (120,000 km^{2}), with 539,000 buildings and structures valued at more than $700 billion. The responsibilities of the ASD(EI&E) include the development of installation capabilities, programs, and budgets; installation-energy programs and policy; base realignment and closure; privatization of military housing and utilities; and integration of environmental needs into the weapons acquisition process. The ASD(EI&E) is also responsible for environmental management, safety and occupational health; environmental restoration at active and closing bases; conservation of natural and cultural resources; pollution prevention; environmental research and technology; fire protection; and explosives safety. The ASD(EI&E) reports to the under secretary of defense for acquisition and sustainment, and is a part of the Office of the Secretary of Defense.

== History ==
Responsibility over installations and environmental affairs at the Defense Department was spread out across a variety of positions over time. Oversight for installations has been lumped together in the past with manpower, acquisition, and logistics functions (see, for example, the history of the assistant secretaries of defense for logistics and material readiness and force management policy). For a brief period in the mid-1990s, the assistant secretary of defense for economic security had oversight for installations and the base realignment and closure (BRAC) program, in addition to DoD policy in the areas of industrial affairs, dual-use technology, international cooperation programs, and community economic adjustment. On April 5, 1996, the DoD nullified Defense Directive 5134.7 (signed August 21, 1995), thereby abolishing the ASD (economic security) while noting that this position has served the "purpose for which it was intended and is no longer required." Responsibility for installations then migrated to the deputy under secretary of defense for installations.

Oversight for environmental affairs was linked together with health affairs for many years (see, for example, the assistant secretary of defense for health affairs). In 2001, the responsibilities for installation and environment functions were merged into a single office. This office is not one of the five principal deputy under secretaries of defense authorized by law, as articulated in the National Defense Authorization Act of 2010. Thus, DoD is statutorily obligated to re-designate this office in the near future, similar to the recent re-designation of the deputy under secretaries of defense within the under secretary of defense for personnel and readiness.

As part of a reorganization on February 1, 2018, the ASD(EI&E) was abolished and combined with the assistant secretary of defense for logistics and materiel readiness to form a new assistant secretary of defense for sustainment. The ASD(EI&E) was reestablished on February 10, 2022.

== Officeholders ==
The table below includes both the various titles of this post over time, as well as all the holders of those offices.

Deputy under secretaries of defense (installations and environment)
| Name | Tenure | SecDef(s) served under | President(s) served under |
|---|---|---|---|
Responsibility for Installations
Director of installations
| Frank Creedon | August 25, 1952 - June 29, 1953 | Robert A. Lovett; Charles E. Wilson | Harry Truman; Dwight Eisenhower |
Assistant Secretary of Defense (Properties and Installations)
| Franklin G. Floete | August 3, 1953 - March 4, 1956 | Charles E. Wilson | Dwight Eisenhower |
| Floyd S. Bryant | May 2, 1956 - January 20, 1961 | Charles E. Wilson; Neil H. McElroy; Thomas S. Gates | Dwight Eisenhower |
Assistant Secretary of Defense (Installations and Logistics)
| Thomas D. Morris | January 29, 1961 - December 11, 1964 | Robert S. McNamara | John F. Kennedy; Lyndon Johnson |
| Paul R. Ignatius | December 23, 1964 - August 31, 1967 | Robert S. McNamara | Lyndon Johnson |
| Thomas D. Morris | September 1, 1967 - February 1, 1969 | Robert S. McNamara; Clark M. Clifford | Lyndon Johnson |
| Barry J. Shillito | February 1, 1969 - February 1, 1973 | Melvin R. Laird | Richard Nixon |
| Arthur I. Mendolia | June 21, 1973 - March 31, 1975 | James R. Schlesinger | Richard Nixon; Gerald Ford |
| John J. Bennett (Acting) | April 1, 1975 - February 9, 1976 | James R. Schlesinger; Donald H. Rumsfeld | Gerald Ford |
| Frank A. Shrontz | February 10, 1976 - January 19, 1977 | Donald H. Rumsfeld | Gerald Ford |
Assistant Secretary of Defense (Manpower, Installations, and Logistics)
| Lawrence J. Korb | January 12, 1984 - July 5, 1985 | Caspar W. Weinberger | Ronald Reagan |
Assistant Secretary of Defense (Development and Support)
| James P. Wade | August 6, 1984 - July 5, 1985 | Caspar W. Weinberger | Ronald Reagan |
Assistant Secretary of Defense (Acquisition and Logistics)
| James P. Wade | July 5, 1985 - November 3, 1986 | Caspar W. Weinberger | Ronald Reagan |
| Robert B. Costello | March 13, 1987 - April 15, 1987 | Caspar W. Weinberger | Ronald Reagan |
Assistant Secretary of Defense (Production and Logistics)
| Robert B. Costello | April 15, 1987 - December 17, 1987 | Caspar W. Weinberger; Frank C. Carlucci III | Ronald Reagan |
| Jack Katzen | March 28, 1988 - January 8, 1990 | Frank C. Carlucci III; William H. Taft IV (Acting); Richard B. Cheney | Ronald Reagan; George H. W. Bush |
| Colin R. McMillan | March 5, 1990 - December 11, 1992 | Richard B. Cheney | George H. W. Bush |
Assistant Secretary of Defense (Economic Security)
| Joshua Gotbaum | May 20, 1994 - December 25, 1995 | William J. Perry | Bill Clinton |
Deputy Under Secretary of Defense (Installations)
| Randall A. Yim | 1999 - 2001 | William S. Cohen | Bill Clinton |
Responsibility for environment
Assistant Secretary of Defense (Health and Environment)
| Dr. Louis M. Rousselot | July 22, 1970 - July 1, 1971 | Melvin R. Laird | Richard Nixon |
| Dr. Richard S. Wilbur | July 27, 1971 - September 1, 1973 | Melvin R. Laird; Elliot L. Richardson; James R. Schlesinger | Richard Nixon |
| Dr. James R. Cowan | February 19, 1974 - March 1, 1976 | James R. Schlesinger; Donald H. Rumsfeld | Richard Nixon; Gerald Ford |
| Vernon McKenzie (Acting) | March 2, 1976 - March 8, 1976 | Donald H. Rumsfeld | Gerald Ford |
Deputy Undersecretary of Defense for Environmental Security
| Sherri W. Goodman | 1993 - 2001 | Leslie Aspin Jr. William J. Perry; William S. Cohen | Bill Clinton |
Merged responsibilities
Deputy Under Secretary of Defense (Installations and Environment)
| Raymond F. DuBois | April 2001 - October 31, 2004 | Donald H. Rumsfeld | George W. Bush |
| Philip W. Grone | November 1, 2004 - February 2008 | Donald H. Rumsfeld; Robert M. Gates | George W. Bush |
| Wayne Arny | February 2008 - July 15, 2009 | Robert M. Gates | George W. Bush; Barack Obama |
| Dr. Dorothy Robyn | July 15, 2009 - September 2012 | Robert M. Gates; Leon Panetta | Barack Obama |
| John Conger (Acting) | September 2012 - December 20, 2014 | Leon Panetta; Chuck Hagel | Barack Obama |
Merged responsibilities
Assistant Secretary of Defense (Energy, Installations and Environment)
| John Conger (Performing the Duties of) | December 20, 2014 - January 20, 2017 | Chuck Hagel; Ashton Carter | Barack Obama |
| Pete Potochney (Principal Deputy Assistant Secretary of Defense for Sustainment) | January 20, 2017 - August 1, 2017 | Ashton Carter; James Mattis | Barack Obama; Donald Trump |
| Lucian Niemeyer | August 2, 2017 - January 20, 2021 | James Mattis | Donald Trump |
Merged responsibilities
Subsumed under Assistant Secretary of Defense (Sustainment) January 2021 - February 2022
Established responsibilities
Assistant Secretary of Defense (Energy, Installations, and Environment)
| Paul D. Cramer (Performing the Duties of) | February 10, 2022 – January 26, 2023 | Lloyd Austin | Joe Biden |
| Brendan Owens | January 26, 2023 – January 20, 2025 | Lloyd Austin | Joe Biden |
| Robert E. Thompson (acting) | January 22, 2025 – June 10, 2025 | Pete Hegseth | Donald Trump |
| Dale R. Marks | June 10, 2025 – present | Pete Hegseth | Donald Trump |
