= Brendan Owens =

American engineer and government official

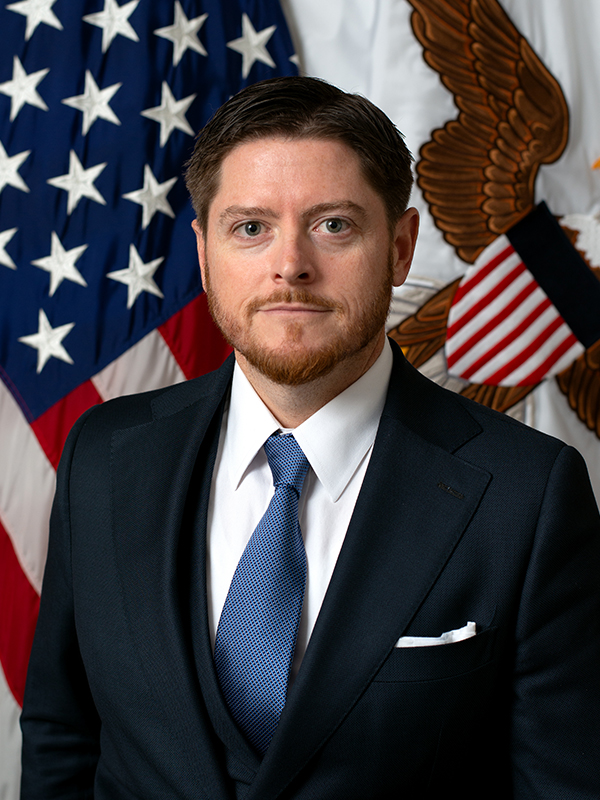

Assistant Secretary of Defense for Energy, Installations, and Environment
- In office January 26, 2023 – January 20, 2025
- President: Joe Biden
- Preceded by: Lucian Niemeyer
- Succeeded by: Dale R. Marks

Personal details
- Children: 2
- Education: Purdue University (BS)

Brendan Owens is an American engineer who served as assistant secretary of defense for energy, installations, and environment in the Biden administration. Owens was confirmed to the post on January 23, 2023, by a Senate vote of 60–35, and sworn in on January 26, 2023. President Joe Biden had first nominated him in March 2022, and the nomination expired when the previous Congress ended without a vote.

== Education ==
Owens earned a Bachelor of Science degree in civil engineering from Purdue University.

== Career ==
From 1997 to 2002, Owens worked as an engineer for SpecPro Inc., an engineering firm based in San Antonio. From 2002 to 2019, he was the vice president of the U.S. Green Building Council for LEED technical development. Since 2019, he has worked as the chief of innovation for ecountabl, a technology company. He is also a principal at Black Vest Strategy, a consulting firm. Earlier in his career he was the energy manager at Fort Belvoir, Virginia, where he worked on what the White House described as the largest energy savings performance contract in the Defense Department's history.

As assistant secretary Owens also held the titles of chief sustainability officer and chief housing officer of the Department of Defense. In 2023 he said the department was accelerating its investment in military housing, including unaccompanied housing, and pointed to the Defense Community Infrastructure Pilot program as a model for making the communities around installations more resilient. He testified before the readiness subcommittee of the House Armed Services Committee on the condition of barracks and other aging infrastructure in February 2024 and on the fiscal 2025 budget request for installations in April 2024.
