= Ellen Lord =

American businesswoman and government official

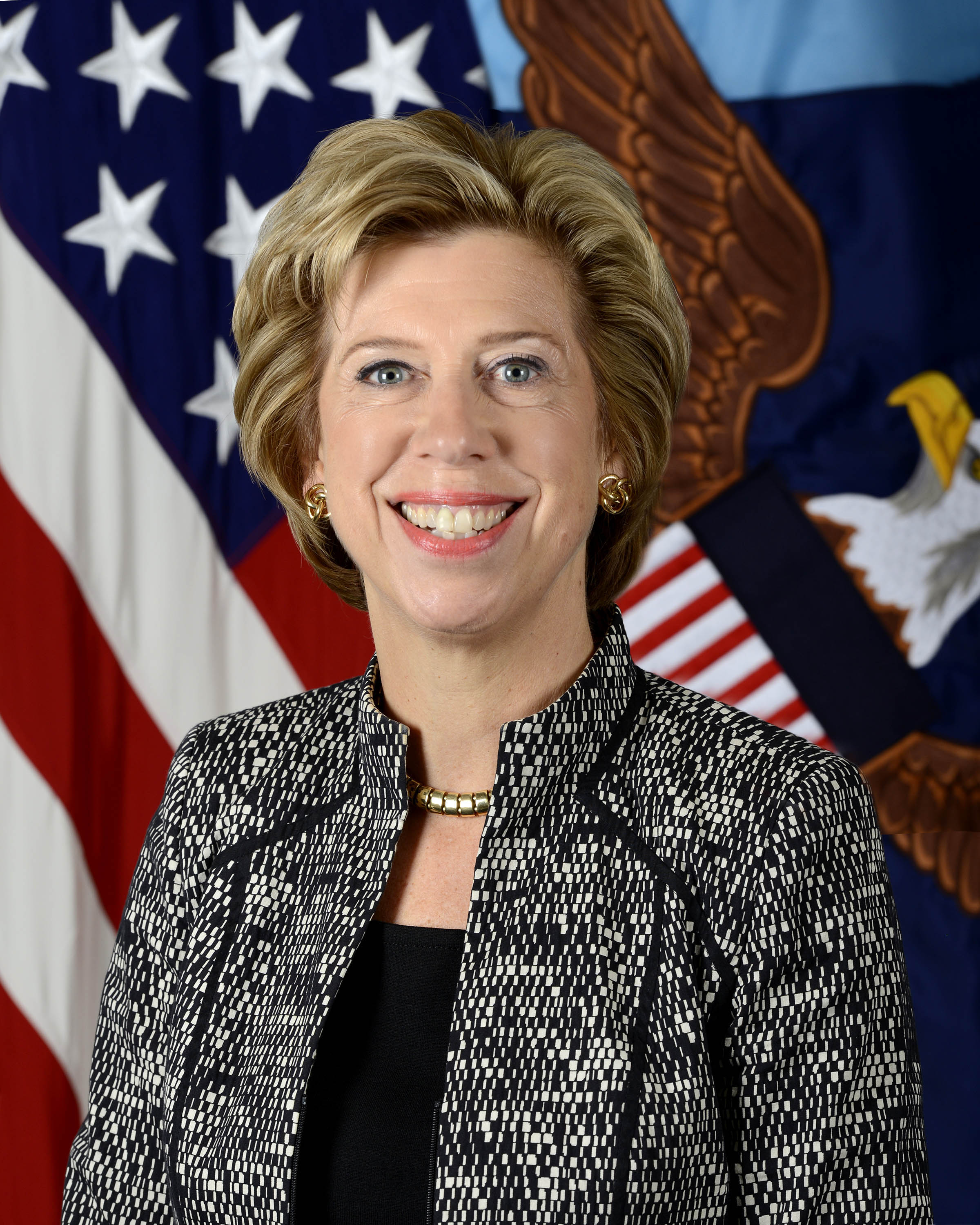

Under Secretary of Defense for Acquisition and Sustainment
- In office February 1, 2018 – January 20, 2021
- President: Donald Trump
- Preceded by: Position established
- Succeeded by: William A. LaPlante

Under Secretary of Defense for Acquisition, Technology and Logistics
- In office August 10, 2017 – February 1, 2018
- President: Donald Trump
- Preceded by: Frank Kendall III
- Succeeded by: Position abolished

Personal details
- Education: Connecticut College (BA); University of New Hampshire (MS)

Ellen M. Lord is an American businesswoman and government official who previously served as Under Secretary of Defense for Acquisition and Sustainment in the first Trump administration. She was previously the CEO of Textron Systems, a global aerospace, defense, security, and advanced technologies industrial conglomerate. In her position, she was the chief weapons purchaser for the United States, responsible for overseeing hundreds of billions of dollars of weapons and services acquisitions programs in the United States Department of Defense.

== Education ==
Lord attended Connecticut College, where she earned an undergraduate degree in Chemistry. She received her Master of Science degree in Chemistry from the University of New Hampshire.

== Career ==
In August 2017, Lord was confirmed as Under Secretary of Defense for Acquisition and Sustainment (A&S).

After leaving the Pentagon in January 2021, Lord founded EML Enterprises, LLC. and joined the consultancy firm the Chertoff Group as a senior advisor. Additionally, she is a Senior Fellow at the Johns Hopkins University Applied Physics Lab, and serves no the Board of Directors for AAR Corporation, Voyager Space, Clarifai, NIOA, and GEOST. She is also a strategic advisor for military contractor SAIC. In April 2026, she joined Marlinspike Partners as Strategic Advisor.

Lord served as vice chairwoman of the National Defense Industrial Association and as a member of the Center for a New American Security's task force on strategy, technology, and the global defense industry. She was also a board member of the Defense Technology Initiative, the Naval Institute Foundation, and the U.S.-India Business Council.

Political offices
Preceded by Jimmy MacStravic; Acting	Under Secretary of Defense for Acquisition and Sustainment; 2017–2021	Succeeded by Stacy A. Cummings; Acting
