= Carol A. DiBattiste =

American lawyer who served as United States Under Secretary of the Air Force

Carol DiBattiste
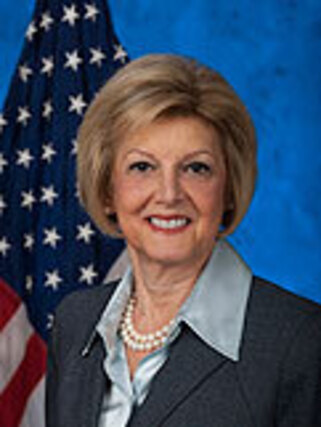

Executive-in-Charge and Vice Chair of the Board of Veterans' Appeals
- In office August 2016 – January 2017
- President: Barack Obama
- Preceded by: Laura Eskenazi
- Succeeded by: David Spickler (acting)

Deputy Administrator of the Transportation Security Administration
- In office July 2004 – April 2005
- President: George W. Bush
- Preceded by: Stephen McHale
- Succeeded by: Robert Jamison

United States Under Secretary of the Air Force
- In office 1999–2001
- President: Bill Clinton
- Preceded by: F. Whitten Peters
- Succeeded by: Lawrence J. Delaney (Acting)

Director of the Executive Office for United States Attorneys
- In office 1994–1997
- President: Bill Clinton
- Preceded by: Anthony Moscato
- Succeeded by: Donna Bucella

Personal details
- Born: Carol Ann DiBattiste; December 28, 1951 (age 74) Philadelphia, Pennsylvania, U.S.
- Education: La Salle University (BA); Temple University (JD); Columbia University (LLM)

Military service
- Allegiance: United States
- Branch/service: United States Air Force
- Years of service: 1971–1991
- Rank: Major

Carol Ann DiBattiste (born December 28, 1951) is an American lawyer who served as United States Under Secretary of the Air Force from 1999 to 2001.

DiBattiste joined the United States Air Force after graduating from high school in 1971. From 1971 to 1976, she served as an accounting and finance specialist and a recruiter for the Air Force. In 1976, she received a B.A. in sociology from La Salle University. She also graduated from Air Force Officer Training School in 1976, and was commissioned as an officer. She completed Squadron Officer School in 1977.

DiBattiste then attended the Temple University Beasley School of Law, receiving her J.D. in 1981. She also completed training to work in the United States Air Force Judge Advocate General's Corps in 1981. She spent 1981-85 working as a prosecutor for the JAG Corps. She spent 1985-1986 completing an LL.M. from Columbia Law School. From 1986 to 1989, DiBattiste was on the Faculty of the Air Force Judge Advocate General School at Maxwell Air Force Base, and from 1989 to 1991, she was chief recruiting attorney of the Office for Professional Development in the Office of the Judge Advocate General at the Pentagon. DiBattiste retired from the Air Force in 1991, having achieved the rank of Major.

From 1991 to 1993, DiBattiste was an Assistant United States Attorney for the Southern District of Florida. In 1993, she joined the United States Department of the Navy as Principal Deputy General Counsel of the Navy, a position she held for a year. She was then director of the DOJ's Executive Office for United States Attorneys from 1994 to 1997. She then spent 1998-99 as Deputy United States Attorney for the Southern District of Florida.

In 1999, President Bill Clinton nominated DiBattiste to be United States Under Secretary of the Air Force. She held this office from August 1999 to January 2001.

In February 2001, DiBattiste joined the law firm of Holland & Knight as a partner, working there until February 2003. In March 2003, she became Chief of Staff of the Transportation Security Administration. In July 2004, she became Deputy Administrator of the TSA, holding this position until April 2005.

DiBattiste moved to the private sector in March 2005, when she became ChoicePoint's Chief Credentialing, Compliance and Privacy Officer. In September 2006, she became the company's general counsel.

In October 2008, DiBattiste became Senior Vice President of Privacy, Security, Compliance and Government Affairs at LexisNexis. In March 2011, DiBattiste became Executive Vice President, General Counsel and Chief Administrative Officer of Geeknet, Inc. In March 2013, DiBattiste became Senior Vice President, Chief Legal, Privacy, Security and Administrative Officer at Education Management Corporation. In August 2016, she became the Executive in Charge of the Board of Veterans' Appeals. She left this role in January 2017 and joined Comscore as the General Counsel & Chief Privacy and People Officer. Since leaving Comscore in 2020, DiBattiste has served on the boards of Wayside Technology Group, Giant Oak, and is an advisor to Liberty Hall Capital Partners and CyberClan.

Government offices
Preceded by F. Whitten Peters	United States Under Secretary of the Air Force; 1999–2001	Succeeded by Lawrence J. Delaney; Acting
