= Darleen Druyun =

American government official & Boeing executive

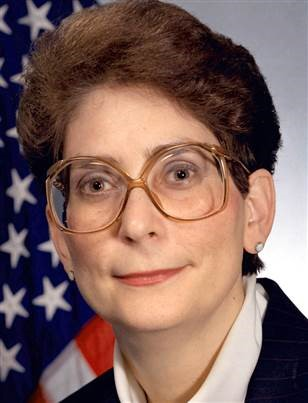

Acting Principal Deputy Undersecretary of the Air Force for Acquisition
- In office January 1993 – May 1994
- President: Bill Clinton
- Preceded by: G. Kim Wincup
- Succeeded by: Clark G. Fiester

Acting Principal Deputy Undersecretary of the Air Force for Acquisition
- In office April 17, 1995 – January 26, 1996
- Preceded by: Clark G. Fiester
- Succeeded by: Arthur L. Money

Personal details
- Born: Darleen A. Druyun
- Education: Chaminade University of Honolulu; Harvard University

Darleen A. Druyun (born November 7, 1947) is a retired Senior Executive Service official of the United States Department of the Air Force and a former Boeing employee. In 2004, Druyun pleaded guilty to a felony in relation to her role in the United States Air Force tanker contract controversy, for engaging in corruption while serving as Principal Deputy Undersecretary of the Air Force for Acquisition.

== Education ==
Druyun graduated from Chaminade University of Honolulu and the executive education program at Harvard Kennedy School at Harvard University.

== Appointments and career ==
From 1991 to 1993, Druyun was at NASA as head of procurement and chief of staff to Administrator Dan Goldin.

In 1993, she was nominated by President Bill Clinton to serve as Principal Deputy Undersecretary of the Air Force for Acquisition. During her subsequent career as air force procurement officer, Druyun "acquire[d] a great deal of authority", in part because she resolved several procurement failure by bending the rules.

Soon after her appointment to the Air Force, Druyun was investigated for her involvement in a plan to speed up payments to McDonnell Douglas for the C-17 Globemaster III airlifter program. Although dozens of other people involved were convicted or discharged, Druyun kept her position. In 1995, Druyun introduced changes to Air Force acquisition processes, including an alternative dispute resolution process. The "lightning bolt" changes reduced the cost of the Joint Direct Attack Munition (JDAM) program. Druyun was also credited with saving the C-17 procurement.

However, the 1993 mass discharge left Druyun unable to consult experienced coworkers for a second opinion, and congress approved replacements only slowly. Donald Rumsfeld would later say about the situation that "there was very little adult supervision".

== U.S. Air Force tanker contract controversy ==
In May 2003, the United States Air Force announced it would lease 100 KC-767 tankers to replace the oldest 136 of its KC-135s. The 10-year lease would give the USAF the option to purchase the aircraft at the end of the contract. In September 2003, responding to critics who argued the lease was vastly more expensive than an outright purchase, the United States Department of Defense announced a revised lease. In November 2003, the Air Force decided it would lease 20 KC-767 aircraft and purchase 80 tankers.

After leaving the Department of the Air Force in 2003, Druyun took a job with Boeing at an annual salary of $250,000. She also received a $50,000 signing bonus.

In December 2003, the Pentagon announced the project was to be frozen while an investigation of allegations of corruption by Druyun was begun. Druyun pleaded guilty to inflating the price of the contract to favor her future employer and to passing information on the competing Airbus A330 MRTT bid (from EADS). CBS News called it "the biggest Pentagon scandal in 20 years" and said she pleaded guilty to a felony.

In October 2004, Druyun was sentenced to nine months in federal prison for corruption, fined $5,000, given three years of supervised release, and 150 hours of community service. She began her prison term on January 5, 2005, and she was released on September 30. The scandal led to the firing of Boeing CFO Michael M. Sears and the resignation of Boeing CEO Phil Condit. On February 18, 2005, Sears was sentenced to four months in prison. Boeing paid $615 million in fines for their involvement.

Druyun was also found guilty in awarding the initial Small Diameter Bomb contract to Boeing.
