= David M. Van Buren =

Assistant Secretary of the US Air Force

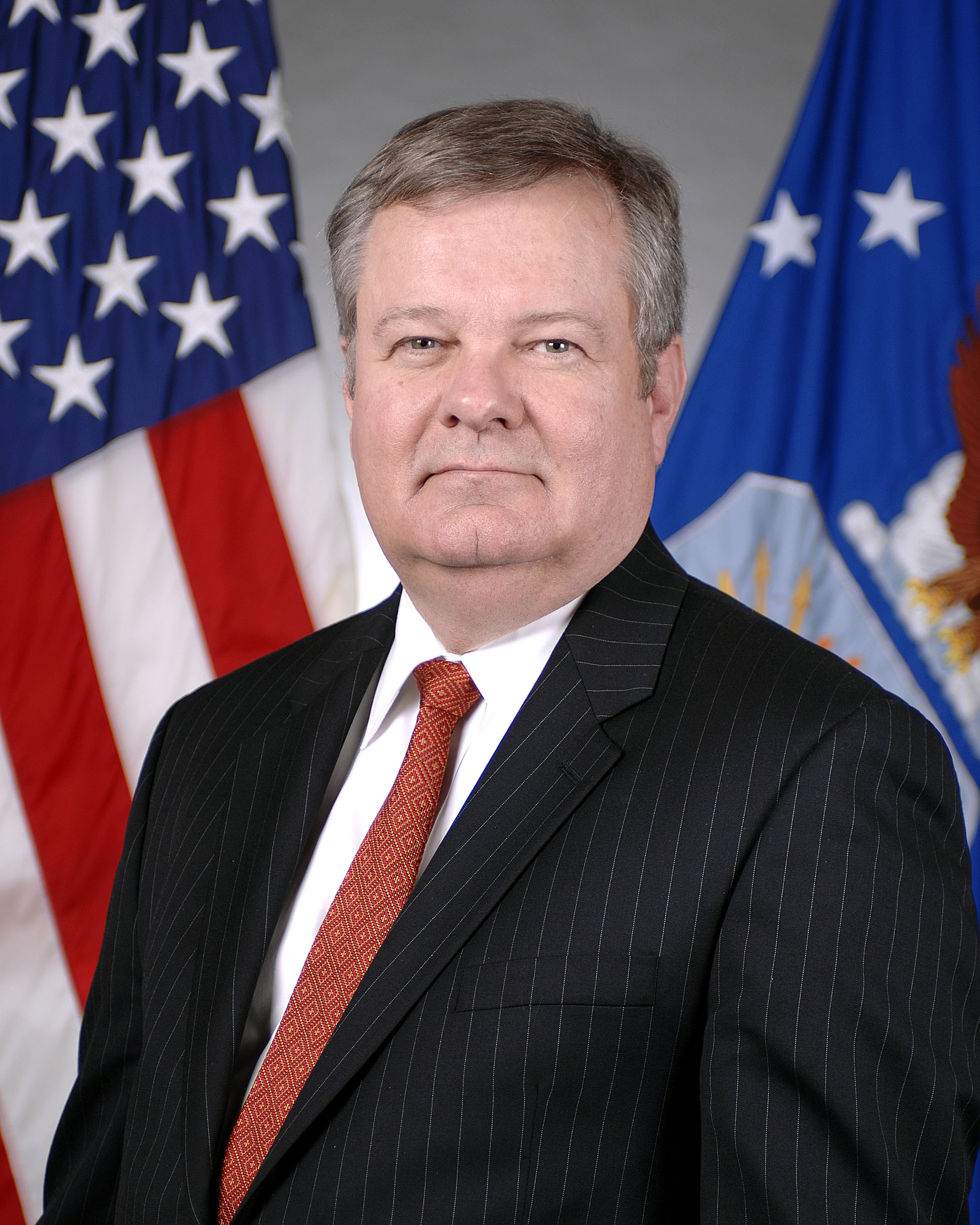
David M. Van Buren

David M. Van Buren is an American civil servant who had served the Acting United States Assistant Secretary of the Air Force (Acquisition).

== Biography ==
David M. Van Buren was educated at the University of Illinois, receiving a bachelor's degree in physical science in 1971. After college, he joined the United States Air Force as an officer, serving there until 1981. While serving in the Air Force, he earned a master's degree in industrial management from Central Michigan University in 1975. He also studied industry at the Air Force Institute of Technology in 1977.

Van Buren left the Air Force in 1981, joining the Lockheed Missiles and Space Company in Sunnyvale, California as a project manager. In 1983, he left for the Northrop Corporation in Pico Rivera, California, where he became Engineering Manager and Deputy Program Manager for the B-2 bomber. In 1987, he attended the Executive Program at the Stanford Graduate School of Business and was promoted to Vice President and Deputy Program Manager. From April 2009 to November 2010, he was Acting Assistant Secretary of the Air Force (Acquisition). In November 2010, he became Principal Deputy Assistant Secretary for Acquisition, though he continued to perform the duties of the Assistant Secretary of the Air Force (Acquisition) until a new Assistant Secretary is named.

Van Buren left Northrop in 1992 to become CEO of the TECSTAR Corporation in Industry, California. In 2000, he moved to Andover, Massachusetts to become President of Raytheon Microelectrics' Commercial Electronics Group. He then spent 2001 to 2004 working as CEO of various private equity firms in Sudbury, Massachusetts and Blackhawk, California. In 2004, he moved to Honolulu to become CEO of Novasol Inc.

Van Buren joined the United States Department of the Air Force in March 2008, when he became Principal Deputy Assistant Secretary of the Air Force for Acquisition and Management. In April 2009 he became the Assistant Secretary of the Air Force (Acquisition).

In April 2012, Van Buren retired from the Air Force and joined L3 as Senior Vice President for Business Strategy

Government offices
Preceded by Sue C. Payton	Acting Assistant Secretary of the Air Force (Acquisition); April 2009 – April 2012	Succeeded by William A. LaPlante, Jr.
