= Alton G. Keel Jr. =

American diplomat (born 1943)

Alton Keel
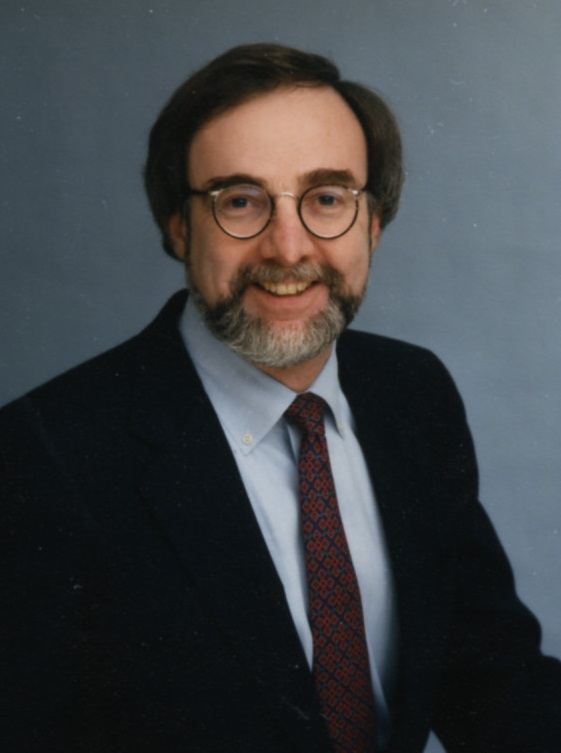

Assistant Secretary for Research, Development, and Logistics
- In office July 30, 1981 – 1982
- President: Ronald Reagan
- Preceded by: Robert Hermann
- Succeeded by: Thomas E. Cooper

14th United States Ambassador to NATO
- In office March 13, 1987 – June 17, 1989
- President: Ronald Reagan; George H. W. Bush
- Preceded by: David Manker Abshire
- Succeeded by: William Howard Taft IV

Personal details
- Born: Alton Gold Keel Jr. September 15, 1943 (age 82) Hampton, Virginia, U.S.
- Education: University of Virginia (BS, MS, PhD)

Alton Gold Keel Jr. (born September 15, 1943) is an American engineer, government official, diplomat, and businessman.

Keel attended the University of Virginia, where he earned a bachelor of science in aerospace engineering in 1966 and a Ph.D. in 1970. He performed weapons research at the Naval Surface Weapons Center, and then joined the staff of the United States Senate, where he was a Congressional science fellow (1976–78) and a staff member of the Senate Armed Services Committee (1978–81). He then served as Assistant Secretary of the Air Force (Acquisition) (1981–82) and Associate Director of the Office of Management and Budget (1982–86). In 1986, he was appointed Executive Director of the Rogers Commission that investigated the Space Shuttle Challenger Disaster.

In July 1986, President Ronald Reagan appointed Keel as the acting principal deputy to the National Security Advisor. From 1987-89, Keel was the United States Permanent Representative to NATO.

Keel has held various positions in corporate governance, and as of 2007 was president and managing director of Atlantic Partners LLC, a private investment-banking group.

Government offices
Preceded by Robert Hermann	Assistant Secretary for Research, Development, and Logistics; 1981–1982	Succeeded by Thomas E. Cooper
Diplomatic posts
Preceded by David Manker Abshire	United States Ambassador to NATO; 1987–1989	Succeeded by William Howard Taft IV
