= Dale Marks =

American defense official and former Air Force pilot

Dale R. Marks
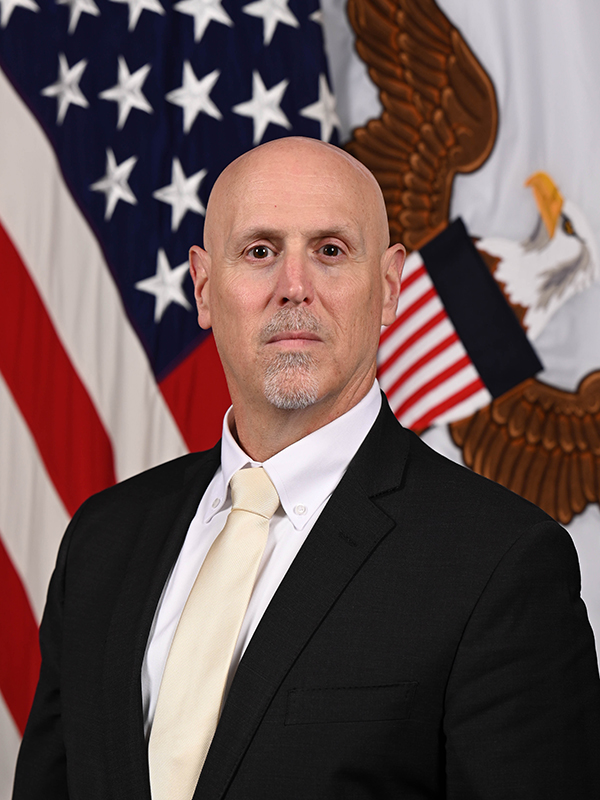

Assistant Secretary of Defense for Energy, Installations, and Environment
- Incumbent
- Assumed office June 2025
- President: Donald Trump
- Preceded by: Brendan Owens

Personal details
- Education: Bowling Green State University (BA); National War College (MS)

Military service
- Allegiance: United States
- Branch/service: United States Air Force; Air National Guard
- Awards: Legion of Merit; Bronze Star Medal

Dale R. Marks is an American defense official and former United States Air Force fighter pilot who has served as Assistant Secretary of Defense for Energy, Installations, and Environment since June 2025. Before his nomination he was executive director of the 96th Test Wing at Eglin Air Force Base, Florida. In September 2026 Secretary of Defense Pete Hegseth put him in charge of selecting the site of a new large military base in the United States.

== Education and military service ==
Marks graduated magna cum laude from Bowling Green State University in 1985 with a Bachelor of Arts in communications. He attended the Air Command and Staff College and the Air War College and received a master's degree in security policy and strategy from the National War College in 2008 as a distinguished graduate.

He served for more than 24 years as an officer in the Air Force and the Air National Guard, with assignments in Air Combat Command, Air Education and Training Command and United States Air Forces in Europe and several tours at the Pentagon. He flew more than 3,000 hours as a fighter pilot in the A-10, F-15E, AT-38 and F-16. Senator Rick Scott, introducing him at his confirmation hearing, described him as a combat-wounded veteran. His military decorations include the Legion of Merit, the Bronze Star Medal, two Meritorious Service Medals and two Air Medals.

== Civilian career ==
After leaving the military Marks was a duty director at the Department of Homeland Security's National Operations Center in 2011, then ran a consulting firm in Colorado and worked from 2014 to 2016 as a senior environmental consultant to the office of the Assistant Secretary of the Air Force for Energy, Installations, and Environment. From 2016 he held civilian posts at Continental NORAD Region – First Air Force at Tyndall Air Force Base, first as associate director of operations and from 2018 to 2020 as deputy chief of staff. Between those posts he deployed to Kabul in 2017–18 as chief of staff for operational sustainment with the Combined Security Transition Command – Afghanistan, United States Forces – Afghanistan and NATO's Resolute Support Mission.

From December 2020 to June 2022 he was deputy director for strategy, plans, programming and analysis for National Guard Bureau space operations in Washington, and in May 2022 he became executive director of the 96th Test Wing of Air Force Materiel Command at Eglin Air Force Base, a Senior Executive Service post in which he directed a workforce of more than 10,000 military, civilian and contractor personnel and base support for the Air Force's largest installation.

== Assistant Secretary of Defense ==
President Donald Trump nominated Marks in February 2025 to succeed Brendan Owens, who had left the post in January. The Senate Armed Services Committee heard his nomination on April 8, 2025. Senator Elizabeth Warren pressed him on the rights of families in privatized military housing, and he committed to keeping the department's Housing Feedback System and to working with the committee on tenant protections. Senator Gary Peters asked him about the cleanup of per- and polyfluoroalkyl substances (PFAS) at military sites, and Marks said the department would remediate to the standards set by law and policy. The committee reported the nomination on May 1, and the Senate confirmed him on June 3, 2025, by 72 votes to 26.

As assistant secretary Marks is the principal adviser to the Under Secretary of Defense for Acquisition and Sustainment on energy, installations and the environment and has policy and budget control over the department's real property, which includes more than 500,000 buildings at over 800 installations. The post also carries responsibility for PFAS contamination at hundreds of installations. He testified before Senate appropriators on June 17, 2025, where Senator Tammy Baldwin criticised the department for not having published a report on environmental cleanups since fiscal year 2023 and Marks said his office would provide an updated report, and before the Armed Services readiness subcommittee the following week on the fiscal 2026 defense authorization bill. After the department adopted the name Department of War, his title was rendered as Assistant Secretary of War.

In September 2026 Marks opened the department's Energy Innovation Expo at the Pentagon, arguing that the distinction between installation energy and operational energy had disappeared and naming the Golden Dome missile defense program, nuclear microreactors for bases and space power among his office's priorities. On September 30, 2026, Hegseth announced a competition among the states to host a new base for 15,000 to 25,000 troops, which he called the "next great American base", and directed Marks to lead the effort to identify, evaluate, select and prepare the site. In a letter to governors and adjutants general on October 22, Marks set a guideline of 100,000 to 250,000 acres while saying smaller offers would be considered. He told Breaking Defense that states had until December 1 to nominate sites, that the department aimed to choose a location by June 2027, that the base would have to run for 30 days disconnected from the civilian grid within two years of opening, and that he expected the fiscal 2028 budget request to include initial funding. He also said the department would use public-private partnerships, not new appropriations, to pay for Hegseth's FORTRESS America program of hardening domestic bases and making them independent of the commercial grid.

== Personal life ==
Marks is married and has four children.
