= Under Secretary of Defense for Acquisition and Sustainment =

Position in the US Department of Defense

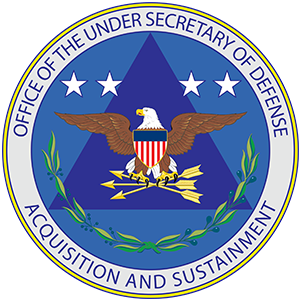
- Seal of the under secretary of defense for acquisition and sustainment

- Flag of an under secretary of defense

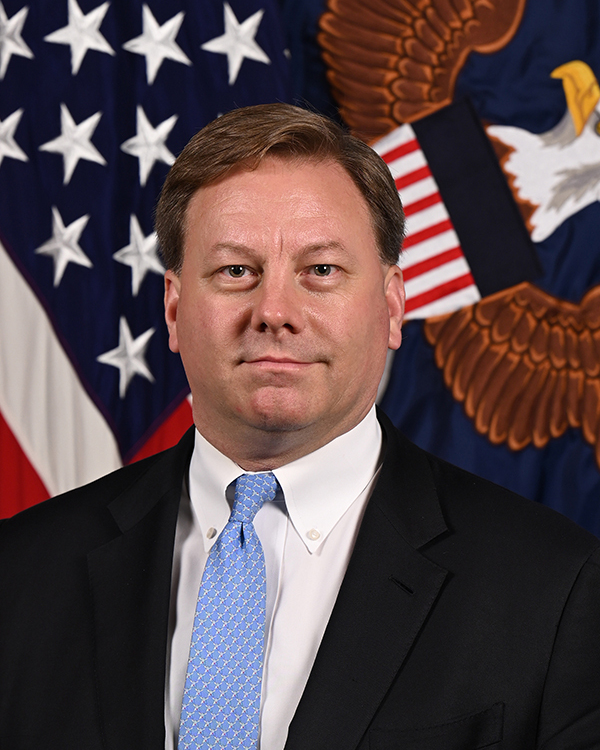
- Incumbent; Michael P. Duffey since 5 June 2025
- Office of the Secretary of Defense
- Style: Mr. Under Secretary
- Reports to: Secretary of Defense; Deputy Secretary of Defense
- Appointer: The president; with Senate advice and consent
- Term length: No fixed term
- Formation: 2018
- Succession: 5th in SecDef succession
- Deputy: Deputy Under Secretary of Defense for Acquisition and Sustainment
- Salary: Executive Schedule, Level III
- Website: www.acq.osd.mil

The under secretary of defense for acquisition and sustainment, or USD (A&S), is the principal staff assistant (PSA) and advisor to the United States secretary of defense for all matters relating to acquisition and sustainment in the Department of Defense. This includes the DoD Acquisition System; system design and development; production; logistics and distribution; installation maintenance, management, and resilience; military construction; procurement of goods and services; material readiness; maintenance; environment and energy resilience (including renewable energy); utilities; business management modernization; International Armaments Cooperation, Cooperative Acquisition and International Agreements, Promoting exportability of military components to allies and partners; nuclear, chemical and biological defense programs; and nuclear command, control, and communications.

Ellen Lord became the first under secretary of defense for acquisition and sustainment on 1 February 2018, after serving as the final under secretary of defense for acquisition, technology, and logistics.

The under secretary is appointed from civilian life by the president with the consent of the Senate to serve at the pleasure of the president.

== Overview ==
The mission of the OUSD(A&S) is Enable the Delivery and Sustainment of Secure and Resilient Capabilities to the Warfighter and International Partners Quickly and Cost Effectively.

The Office of the Under Secretary of Defense for Acquisition and Sustainment (OUSD(A&S)) is focused on forming an acquisition system that moves at the speed of relevance, and to do that, has been shaped into an organization that provides a defense-wide adaptive acquisition framework from need identification to disposal. Using data-driven analysis linked with the National Defense Strategy, OUSD(A&S) scales to enable new product and process development and supports a culture of innovation, critical thinking, and creative compliance. There are multiple organizations that fall under OUSD(A&S) that also work towards this goal.

The Office of the Assistant Secretary of Defense for Acquisition (OASD(A)) delivers capability at the point of need through a Defense Acquisition System that is flexible, tailorable, and enables speed. ASD(A) is focused on moving defense acquisition away from being expensive, slow, and burdensome by reducing timelines, lowering costs, and improving quality while rapidly introducing new technology to enhance capability.

The Office of the Assistant Secretary of Defense for Sustainment (OASD(Sustainment)) works with logistics and materiel readiness in the Department of Defense (DoD) and is the principal logistics official within the senior management of the DoD. In this capacity, the ASD(S) prescribes policies and procedures for the conduct of logistics, maintenance, materiel readiness, strategic mobility, and sustainment support in the DoD, to include, supply, maintenance, and transportation.

The Office of the Assistant Secretary of Defense for Nuclear Deterrence, Chemical & Biological Defense Policy & Programs (OASD(ND-CBD)) leads DoD efforts in preparing for, deterring, and mitigating current and future weapons of mass destruction (WMD) threats. They aim to sustain and modernize the U.S. nuclear deterrent; develop capabilities to detect, protect against and respond to WMD threats; ensure DoD compliance with nuclear, chemical, and biological treaties and agreements; continue to work with allies and partners to strengthen our collective countering weapons of mass destruction (CWMD) capabilities; and advance the United States nonproliferation goals.

The Industrial Policy office supports the Under Secretary of Defense for Acquisition and Sustainment by providing detailed analyses and in-depth understanding of the increasingly global, commercial, and financially complex industrial supply chain essential to our national defense.

The Executive Director for Special Access Program Central Office facilitates and maintains MOAs and memorandums of understanding for foreign involvement with DoD SAPs and coordinates with appropriate oversight authorities.

International Cooperation (IC) Office is to strengthen key international partnerships through cooperative Acquisition & Sustainment initiatives to improve interoperability and sharpen the warfighter’s technological edge. IC prioritizes enabling a lethal, secure, and networked constellation of allies and partners.

== History ==
The Military Retirement Reform Act of 1986 created the position of Under Secretary of Defense for Acquisition (USD(A)), which was implemented with the issuance of Department of Defense Directive 5134.1 in February 1987. As part of this act, the position of Under Secretary of Defense for Research and Engineering (USD(R&E)) was redesignated as the Director of Defense Research and Engineering (DDR&E), a lower-ranking position which reported to the new USD(A).

The title of USD(A) was changed to Under Secretary of Defense for Acquisition and Technology (USD(A&T)) by the National Defense Authorization Act for Fiscal Year 1994, and the position was later redesignated as the Under Secretary of Defense for Acquisition, Technology, and Logistics (USD(AT&L)) by the National Defense Authorization Act for Fiscal Year 2000. The USD(AT&L) served as the principal assistant to the Secretary of Defense for research and development, production, procurement, logistics, and military construction.

The National Defense Authorization Act for Fiscal Year 2017 removed the position of USD(AT&L), and in its place it created the position of USD(R&E) once again, as well as the new position of USD(A&S). These changes took effect on 1 February 2018. As part of the reorganization, the Assistant Secretary of Defense for Logistics and Materiel Readiness (ASD(L&MR)) and Assistant Secretary of Defense for Energy, Installations, and Environment (ASD(EI&E)) positions were combined into a new Assistant Secretary of Defense for Sustainment.

== Organization ==
- Under Secretary of Defense for Acquisition and Sustainment
  - Office of the Chief of Staff
    - Commander's Action Group
  - Deputy Under Secretary of Defense for Acquisition and Sustainment
    - Office of Business Operations
  - Office of the Assistant Secretary of Defense for Acquisition
    - Defense Acquisition University
    - Defense Contract Management Agency
    - Joint Rapid Acquisition Cell
  - Office of the Assistant Secretary of Defense for Sustainment
    - Defense Logistics Agency
  - Office of the Assistant Secretary of Defense for Energy, Installations, and Environment
    - Office of the Deputy Assistant Secretary of Defense for Infrastructure Modernization & Resilience
    - Office of the Deputy Assistant Secretary of Defense for Environmental Management & Restoration
    - Office of the Deputy Assistant Secretary of Defense for Housing (H)
    - Office of the Deputy Assistant Secretary of Defense for Energy Resilience & Optimization
    - Office of Local Defense Community Cooperation
  - Office of the Assistant Secretary of Defense for Acquisition
    - Office of the Deputy Assistant Secretary of Defense for Industrial Base Resilience
    - Office of the Deputy Assistant Secretary of Defense for International and Industry Engagement
    - Office of Small Business Programs
    - Office of Global Investment and Economic Security
  - Office of the Secretary of Defense for Nuclear Deterrence, Chemical, and Biological Defense Policy and Programs
    - Office of the Deputy Assistant Secretary of Defense for Chemical, Biological, Radiological, and Nuclear Defense
    - Office of the Deputy Assistant Secretary of Defense for Nuclear Deterrence and Counter-WMD Policy
    - Office of the Deputy Assistant Secretary of Defense for Nuclear Matters
    - Defense Threat Reduction Agency
  - Office of International Cooperation
  - Office of Special Programs
  - Office of Human Capital Initiatives
  - Office of the Assistant Secretary of Defense for International Armaments Cooperation

== Office of the Under Secretary ==
The Office of the Under Secretary of Defense for Acquisition and Sustainment (OUSD(A&S)), a unit of the Office of the Secretary of Defense, supervises all Department of Defense acquisitions, including procurement of goods and services, research and development, developmental testing, and contract administration, for all elements of the Department. Led by the Under Secretary, OUSD(A&S) oversees logistics, maintenance, and sustainment support for all elements of the Department and establishes policies for the maintenance of the defense industrial base of the United States.

The work of OUSD(A&S) is conducted through its several staff directorates, including:

- Human Capital Initiatives Directorate – responsible for executing all workforce responsibilities identified by the Secretary of Defense
- Acquisition Resources and Analyses Directorate – integrates the diverse aspects of Defense acquisition into a balanced and coherent program that supports the National Strategy and makes the most effective use of resources provided
- International Cooperation Directorate – supports the Under Secretary in all aspects of international cooperation, develops policy for international cooperative armaments programs, and provides the Under Secretary a single, integrated picture of international cooperative activities
- Special Programs Directorate – manages the DoD Special Access Program (SAP) management and control structures
- Small Business Programs Directorate – advises the Secretary of Defense on all matters related to small business and is committed to maximizing the contributions of small business in DoD acquisitions
- Administration Directorate – serves as the central focal point for all OUSD(A&S) civilian and military personnel programs, organizational management, space, facilities, supply management, security, information management, travel, budgeting, and training
- Defense Procurement & Acquisition Policy Directorate – responsible for all acquisition and procurement policy matters in the Department, including serving as the principal advisor to the Under Secretary on acquisition/procurement strategies for all major weapon systems programs, major automated information systems programs, and services acquisitions
- Joint Rapid Acquisition Cell – provides a single point of contact in the Office of the Secretary of Defense for tracking the timeliness of immediate warfighter need actions for the senior leadership and facilitating coordination with other government agencies
- Defense Science Board – provides senior Department leadership independent advice and recommendations on scientific, technical, manufacturing, acquisition process, and other matters of special interest to the Department
- Office of the Deputy Assistant Secretary of Defense for Industrial Policy – responsible for ensuring that Department policies, procedures, and actions:
  - stimulate and support vigorous competition and innovation in the industrial base supporting defense
  - establish and sustain cost-effective industrial and technological capabilities that assure military readiness and superiority

== Office holders ==
=== Under Secretary ===
Portrait	Name	Tenure	SecDef(s) served under	President(s) served under
Under Secretary of Defense for Acquisition
	Richard P. Godwin	30 September 1986 – 30 September 1987	Caspar W. Weinberger	Ronald Reagan
	Robert B. Costello	18 December 1987 – 12 May 1989	Frank C. Carlucci III; William Howard Taft IV (Acting); Richard B. Cheney	Ronald Reagan; George H. W. Bush
	John A. Betti	11 August 1989 – 31 December 1990	Richard B. Cheney	George H. W. Bush
	Donald J. Yockey	1 January 1991 – 20 June 1991 (Acting); 20 June 1991 – 20 January 1993	Richard B. Cheney	George H. W. Bush
Under Secretary of Defense for Acquisition and Technology
	John M. Deutch	2 April 1993 – 11 March 1994	Leslie Aspin, Jr. William J. Perry	Bill Clinton
	Paul G. Kaminski	3 October 1994 – 16 May 1997	William J. Perry; William S. Cohen	Bill Clinton
Under Secretary of Defense for Acquisition, Technology, and Logistics
	Jacques S. Gansler	10 November 1997 – 5 January 2001	William S. Cohen	Bill Clinton
	Edward C. Aldridge, Jr.	10 May 2001 – 23 May 2003	Donald H. Rumsfeld	George W. Bush
	Michael Wynne (Acting)	23 May 2003 – 6 June 2005	Donald H. Rumsfeld	George W. Bush
	Kenneth J. Krieg	6 June 2005 – 20 July 2007	Donald H. Rumsfeld; Robert M. Gates	George W. Bush
	John J. Young Jr.	20 July 2007 – 21 November 2007 (Acting); 21 November 2007 – 27 April 2009	Robert M. Gates	George W. Bush; Barack Obama
	Ashton Carter	27 April 2009 – 5 October 2011	Robert M. Gates; Leon Panetta	Barack Obama
	Frank Kendall III	6 October 2011 – 20 January 2017	Leon Panetta; Chuck Hagel; Ash Carter	Barack Obama
	Jimmy MacStravic	20 January 2017 – 10 August 2017 (Performing the Duties of)	James Mattis	Donald Trump
	Ellen Lord	10 August 2017 – 1 February 2018	James Mattis	Donald Trump
Under Secretary of Defense for Acquisition and Sustainment
	Ellen Lord	1 February 2018 – 20 January 2021	James Mattis; Patrick M. Shanahan (acting); Mark Esper (acting); Richard V. Spencer (acting); Mark Esper	Donald Trump
	Stacy Cummings	20 January 2021 – 2 August 2021 (Performing the Duties of)	David L. Norquist (acting); Lloyd Austin	Joe Biden
	Gregory M. Kausner	2 August 2021 – 7 February 2022 (Performing the Duties of)	Lloyd Austin	Joe Biden
	Andrew P. Hunter	7 February 2022 – 15 April 2022 (Performing the Duties of)	Lloyd Austin	Joe Biden
	William A. LaPlante	15 April 2022 – 20 January 2025	Lloyd Austin	Joe Biden
	Steven J. Morani	20 January 2025 – 5 June 2025 (Performing the Duties of)	Pete Hegseth	Donald Trump
	Michael P. Duffey	5 June 2025 – Present	Pete Hegseth	Donald Trump

=== Deputy Under Secretary ===
Principal Deputy Under Secretaries of Defense for Acquisition, Technology and Logistics
Name	Tenure	USD(s) Served Under	SecDef(s) Served Under	President(s) Served Under
Milton Lohr	3 October 1988 – 12 May 1989	Robert B. Costello	Richard B. Cheney	George H. W. Bush
Donald J. Yockey	12 March 1990 – 20 January 1991	John A. Betti	Richard B. Cheney	George H. W. Bush
Donald C. Fraser	4 December 1991 – 13 January 1993	Donald J. Yockey	Richard B. Cheney	George H. W. Bush
Noel Longuemare, Jr.	18 November 1993 – 21 November 1997	John M. Deutch; Paul G. Kaminski; Jacques S. Gansler	Leslie Aspin, Jr. William J. Perry; William S. Cohen	Bill Clinton
David Oliver	1 June 1998 – 14 July 2001	Jacques S. Gansler; Edward C. Aldridge Jr.	William S. Cohen; Donald H. Rumsfeld	Bill Clinton; George W. Bush
Michael W. Wynne	17 July 2001 – 3 November 2005	Edward C. Aldridge Jr. Kenneth J. Krieg	Donald H. Rumsfeld	George W. Bush
James I. Finley	1 March 2006 – 20 January 2009	Kenneth J. Krieg; John J. Young Jr.	George W. Bush	
Frank Kendall III	8 March 2010 – 5 October 2011	Ashton Carter	Robert M. Gates; Leon Panetta	Barack Obama
Alan Estevez	6 October 2011 – 20 January 2017	Frank Kendall III	Leon Panetta; Chuck Hagel; Ash Carter	Barack Obama
Alan Shaffer	28 January 2019 – 20 January 2021	Ellen Lord	Patrick M. Shanahan (acting); Mark Esper; Christopher C. Miller (acting)	Donald Trump
Gregory M. Kausner (acting)	20 January 2021 – 2 August 2021	Stacy Cummings (acting)	Lloyd Austin	Joe Biden
Paul D. Cramer (acting)	2 August 2021 – 21 April 2023	Gregory M. Kausner (acting); Andrew P. Hunter (acting); William A. LaPlante	Lloyd Austin	Joe Biden
Radha Iyengar Plumb	21 April 2023 – 8 April 2024	William A. LaPlante	Lloyd Austin	Joe Biden
Deborah Rosenblum (acting)	8 April 2024 – 20 January 2025	William A. LaPlante	Lloyd Austin	Joe Biden
Brent G. Ingraham (acting)	22 January 2025 – 22 September 2025	Steven J. Morani (acting); Michael P. Duffey	Pete Hegseth	Donald Trump
Dale R. Marks (Performing the Duties of)	22 September 2025 – 26 July 2026	Michael P. Duffey	Pete Hegseth	Donald Trump
Daniel L. Zimmerman (Performing the Duties of)	26 July 2026 – Present	Michael P. Duffey	Pete Hegseth	Donald Trump

== See also ==
- The Technical Cooperation Program (TTCP) – An international defense science and technology collaboration between Australia, Canada, New Zealand, the United Kingdom and the United States.
