= Sue C. Payton =

American government official (born 1950)

Sue Carol Payton
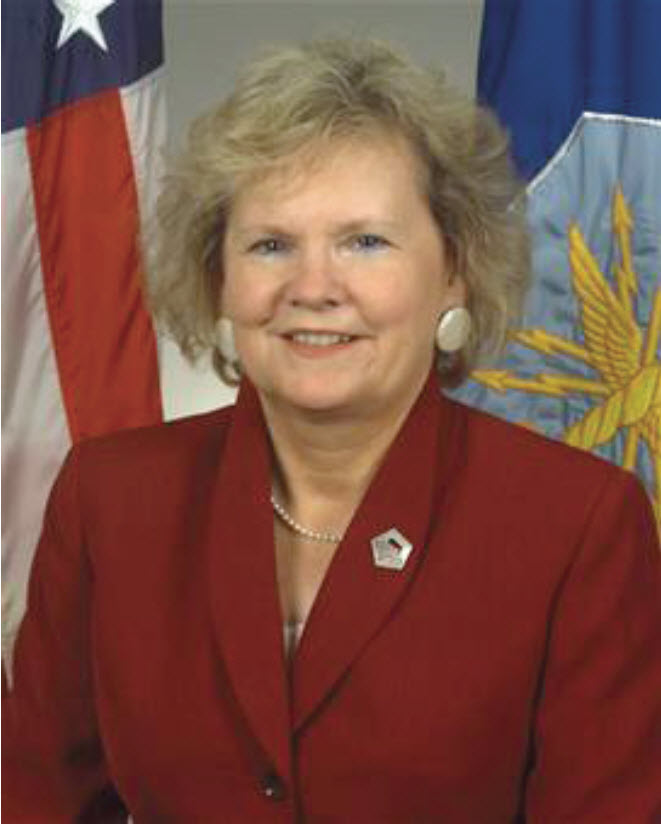
- Sue C. Payton
- Born: Sue Carol Campbell; September 29, 1950 (age 75); Champaign, Illinois, U.S.
- Education: Eastern Illinois University
- Occupation: American government official

Sue Carol Payton (born September 29, 1950) was United States Assistant Secretary of the Air Force (Acquisition) from 2006 to 2009. She was born in Champaign, Illinois.

== Education ==
Sue C. Payton was educated at Eastern Illinois University, receiving a BS in education in 1972. She later returned to school at the University of Southern California and earned an M.S. in systems acquisition management and systems technology in 1985.

== Career ==
In 1989, Payton joined Martin Marietta in Reston, Virginia as Senior Site Systems Integration Manager. She worked there until 1994, when she moved to Lockheed Martin (also in Reston), as Manager of Advanced Technology in the Office of the Vice President (Business Development). She left Lockheed Martin in 1998. She then completed the Executive Program of the Goizueta Business School later in 1998.

In 1999, Payton became Director of the National Center for Applied Technology in Springfield, Virginia. She joined ImageLinks, Inc. (later acquired by the Harris Corporation) as Vice President (Applied Technology) in 2000.

Payton joined the United States Department of Defense in Washington, D.C. in 2001, when she was named Deputy Under Secretary of Defense for Advanced Systems and Concepts. On April 25, 2006, President of the United States George W. Bush nominated Payton to be Assistant Secretary of the Air Force (Acquisition). She subsequently held this office for the rest of the Bush administration.

== Personal life ==
Sue Payton is married to astronaut and aerospace educator Col. Gary Payton and they have a daughter Courtney.

Government offices
Preceded by Marvin R. Sambur	Assistant Secretary of the Air Force (Acquisition); 2006 – April 2009	Succeeded by David M. Van Buren (acting)
