= Sheila Widnall =

American aerospace researcher and educator

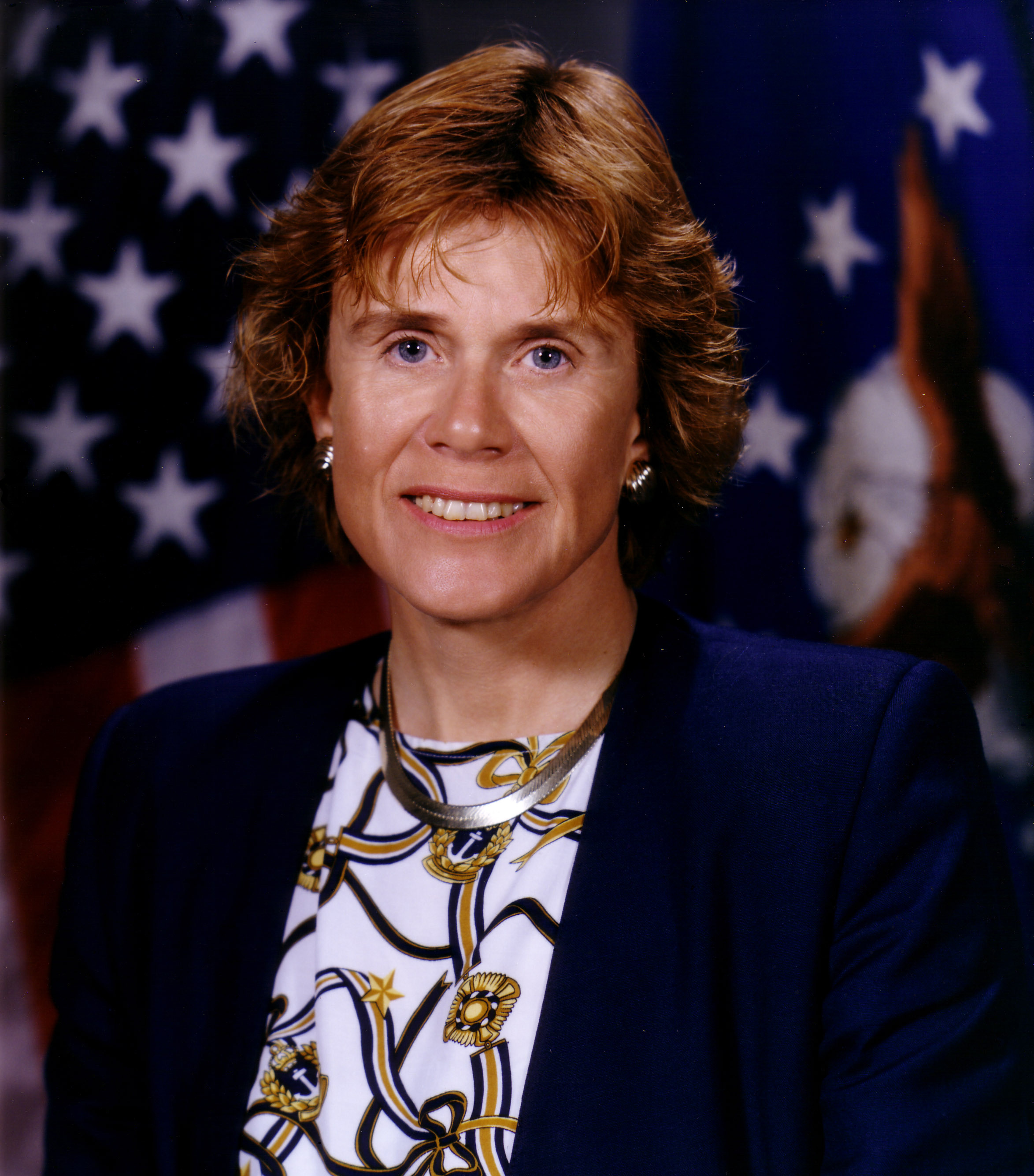

18th United States Secretary of the Air Force
- In office August 6, 1993 – October 31, 1997
- President: Bill Clinton
- Preceded by: Donald Rice
- Succeeded by: F. Whitten Peters

Personal details
- Born: Sheila Marie Evans; July 13, 1938 (age 88) Tacoma, Washington, U.S.
- Party: Democratic
- Spouse: William Widnall
- Children: 2
- Education: Massachusetts Institute of Technology (BS, MS, DSc)

Sheila Marie Evans Widnall (born July 13, 1938) is an American aerospace researcher and Institute Professor Emerita at the Massachusetts Institute of Technology (MIT). She served as the United States Secretary of the Air Force from 1993 to 1997, becoming the first woman to hold that post and the first woman to lead an entire branch of the United States Armed Forces in the Department of Defense. She was elected to the National Academy of Engineering and the American Academy of Arts and Sciences and inducted into the National Women's Hall of Fame.

== Early life and education ==
Sheila Marie Evans was born to Rolland and Genevieve Evans and raised in Tacoma, Washington. She graduated from the Aquinas Academy for Girls in 1956. Encouraged to attend MIT by a local businessman, she graduated from MIT with a SB in 1960, SM in 1961, and ScD in 1964, all in Aeronautics and Astronautics. Her master's thesis was entitled Boundary layer stability over flexible surfaces, and her doctoral thesis was entitled Unsteady loads on hydrofoils including free surface effects and cavitation, both under the supervision of Marten T. Landahl.

== Career and research ==
After earning her doctorate in 1964, Widnall was hired as the first female faculty member in the MIT School of Engineering, joining the faculty of the Aeronautics and Astronautics Department. She was promoted to Associate Professor in 1970 and to Professor in 1974. She was appointed the Abby Rockefeller Mauzé Professor of Aeronautics and Astronautics in 1986 and joined the Engineering Systems Division. She served as Chair of the Faculty from 1979–1981 (the first woman to hold this position), and as MIT's Associate Provost from 1992–1993. In 1997, when she returned to MIT from her service as Secretary of the Air Force, she was named an Institute Professor. In 2020, she became Professor Emerita after 64 years at MIT.

Widnall's initial research in fluid mechanics was focused on the analysis of vortices trailing from the wings of aircraft. This helped determine the hazards of wake turbulence which was invisible. Her work led to increased safety at airports and improved airport capacity. The Widnall instability is named after her. Her other research included helicopter and aircraft noise, unsteady aerodynamics, wing theory, and turbulent flow.

While at MIT, Widnall was very active in advocating for women students and faculty. She worked with the admissions office to change their procedures for evaluating potential undergraduate and graduate students, mentored students and faculty, influenced the rectification of gender pay inequities, and originated and taught a course for freshmen engineering students to help with retention of women and minority students.

Widnall was a member of the board of investigation into the Space Shuttle Columbia disaster.

Widnall worked with MIT's Lean Aerospace Initiative (LAI) - which investigated the state of the aerospace industry in the United States.

== Secretary of the Air Force ==
On July 4, 1993, in the wake of the Tailhook scandal, President Bill Clinton announced Widnall's nomination to be Secretary of the Air Force. Prior to her nomination, she had served as chair of the Air Force Academy's Board of Visitors, as well as serving on several Air Force advisory boards. The Senate received her nomination on July 22, 1993, and confirmed her two weeks later on August 5, 1993, 183 days after inauguration and 197 after the office became vacant. She was the first woman to head a branch of the US military. During her tenure, she handled the Kelly Flinn scandal.

During her 4-year term, Widnall started the program to develop the expendable launch vehicle for the Atlas 5 and Delta 4 rockets. She also defined the character of the Air Force, promoting the core values of the Air Force Academy: “Integrity first. Service before self. Excellence in all we do.”

== Awards and organizations ==
Widnall was the first director of the Office of University Research for the US Department of Transportation 1974–1975. She received the Achievement Award from the Society of Women Engineers in 1975. She was elected to the National Academy of Engineering in 1985, serving as vice-president from 1998 to 2005, and winning their Arthur M. Bueche Award in 2009. In 1988, she was elected President of the American Association for the Advancement of Science. She was elected to the American Academy of Arts and Sciences that same year. She served as trustee of the Carnegie Corporation including Vice Chair of the Board and Chair of the Nominating Committee.

In 2000, Widnall was elected to the American Philosophical Society.She also served on many committees and boards for the National Academy of Engineering, National Academy of Sciences, and the National Research Council. Widnall was very involved in service to professional societies including the American Institute of Aeronautics and Astronautics (AIAA) and the American Society of Mechanical Engineers (ASME). She was president of AIAA 1999–2000 (the first female president). She was inducted into the National Women’s Hall of Fame in 2003. She was a Fellow in APS, AAAS and AIAA. Widnall received numerous honorary degrees.

Her many other awards include

- 1972, Lawrence Sperry Achievement Award, AIAA
- 1987, Washburn Award, Boston Museum of Science
- 1993, Distinguished Service Award, National Academy of Engineering
- 1996, ASME Applied Mechanics Award
- 1996, Women in Aviation Pioneer Hall of Fame
- 1997, Defense Distinguished Service Medal
- 1998, Goddard Award, National Space Club
- 2000, Reed Aeronautics Award
- 2001, Spirt of St. Louis Medal, ASME
- 2003, Inductee, National Women's Hall of Fame
- 2005, Public Service Medal, NASA
- 2019, David Guggenheim Medal (first woman)

== Legacy ==
A "trailblazer" who saw herself having two roles in the women’s movement, Widnall believed she needed to be very successful and visible at what she was doing so women had a role model, and men would believe that women could achieve. In addition, she wanted to make life better for women at MIT.

Her firsts at MIT include: first undergraduate alumna appointed to the MIT faculty, first woman appointed to the MIT School of Engineering faculty, first woman to receive the Ford postdoctoral fellowship when appointed to the MIT faculty, and first woman elected Chair of the Faculty.

Widnall’s work on vortex flow within the field of fluid mechanics resulted in the naming of the Widnall instability in her honor. In the 1970s, Widnall wrote a series of this phenomenon, a low frequency instability.

Her other pioneering firsts include first woman to serve as head of a branch of the U.S. military as Secretary of the Air Force, first woman to serve as President of the AIAA, and first woman to receive the Guggenheim Medal.

== Personal life ==
She married William Soule Widnall in June 1960. Her husband, the son of former New Jersey congressman William B. Widnall , earned a doctorate degree from MIT in aerospace engineering and headed the MIT-Draper team that developed the Apollo GN&C system. The couple has two grown children, William and Ann Marie Vawter.

== Writings ==
- "Science and the Atari Generation." Science (August 12, 1983): 607.
- "AAAS Presidential Lecture: Voices from the Pipeline." Science (September 30, 1988): 1740–1745.

Military offices
Preceded by Merrill McPeak; Acting	United States Secretary of the Air Force; 1993–1997	Succeeded by Whitten Peters
