= F. Whitten Peters =

American lawyer

Whit Peters
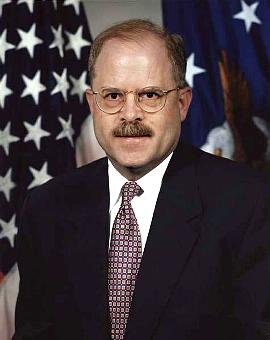

19th United States Secretary of the Air Force
- In office November 1, 1997 – January 20, 2001; Acting: November 1, 1997 – July 30, 1999
- President: Bill Clinton
- Preceded by: Sheila Widnall
- Succeeded by: James G. Roche

United States Under Secretary of the Air Force
- In office 1997–1999
- President: Bill Clinton
- Preceded by: Rudy de Leon
- Succeeded by: Carol A. DiBattiste

Personal details
- Born: Frederick Whitten Peters; August 20, 1946 (age 79) Omaha, Nebraska, U.S.
- Party: Democratic
- Education: Harvard University (BA, JD); London School of Economics (MSc)

Military service
- Allegiance: United States
- Branch/service: United States Navy
- Years of service: 1969–1972
- Unit: Atlantic Fleet Intelligence

Frederick Whitten Peters (born August 20, 1946) is a District of Columbia lawyer and senior level public official. His law practice specializes in civil and criminal litigation including contract fraud, antitrust, tax and security cases. He has served in several key positions within the U.S. federal government, including as Secretary of the Air Force.

== Early life ==
Before Peters had entered school, his family moved to Chicago, Illinois. He grew up and attended Lake Forest High School from 1960 to 1964 in a northern suburb of Chicago where his father had an architectural business. His father died when he was 13. Peters went on to earn a scholarship to Harvard University from the Harvard Club of Chicago. He graduated from Harvard magna cum laude with a bachelor of arts degree in government and economics in 1968.

In 1969, Peters joined the United States Navy, and earned distinguished graduate honors from the Navy Officer Candidate School in Newport, Rhode Island. Because of his computer training at Harvard, he was assigned to the Atlantic Fleet Intelligence Center in Norfolk, Virginia, where he ran the computer systems division. The sensitive nature of the information he handled at the Norfolk intelligence center prevented him from assignment to a war zone and prohibited him from traveling to a number of foreign countries for 10 years following the assignment. While he was there, the intelligence center received a meritorious unit citation for discovering Russian-built submarine pens in Cuba.

In February 1972, he was released by the Navy and hired back the next day as a civilian employee to complete a special project. In August 1972, he received Harvard's Frank Knox Traveling Fellowship to attend the London School of Economics. He earned a Master of Science degree with distinction in economics in 1973. He then entered Harvard Law School. He served as president of the Harvard Law Review for two years, and graduated magna cum laude with a Juris Doctor degree in 1976.

== Law practice ==
Following law school, Peters clerked for Federal Circuit Judge J. Skelly Wright and Supreme Court Justice William J. Brennan in the District of Columbia. In 1978, he joined the Williams & Connolly law firm in Washington, D.C. as an associate attorney, becoming a partner in 1984. He remained with Williams & Connolly until 1995.

During this time, Peters also served as an adjunct lecturer teaching government contract law at Columbus School of Law and Catholic University of America, and taught advanced criminal procedure at Georgetown University Law Center. Peters served as a member of the Department of Defense Advisory Committee on Streamlining and Codifying Acquisition Law, and as chairman of the District of Columbia Bar Association's Rules of Professional Responsibility Review Committee.

== Public service ==
In 1995, President Bill Clinton appointed Peters as principal deputy general counsel of the Department of Defense. In this position, he worked a wide range of defense issues including acquisition reform, counterterrorism, information system security, and affirmative action. In 1997, Secretary of Defense William Cohen recommended Peters for appointment as Under Secretary of the Air Force. The President and United States Senate agreed, and he was sworn into that office on November 13, 1997. After Secretary of the Air Force Sheila Widnall resigned, Peters served as acting Secretary of the Air Force for 19 months.

President Clinton nominated Peters to be Secretary of the Air Force on June 2, 1999. The Senate confirmed his appointment on July 30, 1999, and he was sworn in as the nineteenth Secretary on August 3, 1999. During his tenure as Secretary, the Air Force demonstrated its power in the Kosovo conflict while Peters helped secure funding for the F-22 air superiority fighter. Peters served as Air Force Secretary until January 20, 2001.

== Return to law ==
After leaving the Air Force in 2001, Peters returned to the Washington law firm of Williams & Connolly as partner. He also served as vice chairman of the President's Commission on the Future of the U.S. Aerospace Industry which studied America's aerospace industry and assessed the future importance of that industry to the nation's security within the twenty-first century global environment. The commission's final report was submitted to the President and Congress on November 27, 2002.

Peters also joined several private sector companies as a consultant or member of the board of directors. These firms included DynCorp of Reston, Virginia, where Peters took on the role of special assistant to the chief executive office in April 2001, and Ellipso corporation where he was elected to the board of directors in May 2001.

Peters remains active in politics. During the 2008 Presidential race, Peters endorsed then-Senator Barack Obama, and was listed among the Senator's foreign policy advisors.

== See also ==
- List of law clerks for the third seat of the Supreme Court of the United States

Government offices
Preceded by Rudy de Leon	United States Under Secretary of the Air Force; 1997–1999	Succeeded by Carol A. DiBattiste
Preceded by Sheila Widnall	United States Secretary of the Air Force; 1997–2001; Acting:1997–1999	Succeeded by James G. Roche
