= Herschmann =

Herschmann, Herschman, or Hershman may refer to:

== People ==
=== Surname ===
Herschmann:

- Eric Herschmann (born 1962), American political advisor and attorney
- Otto Herschmann (1877–1942), Austrian Jewish Olympian medalist in swimming and fencing; Holocaust victim
- Nicole Herschmann (born 1975), German bobsledder

Hershman:

- Brandt Hershman, American politician
- Joel Hershman (born 1958), American film director, writer, and producer
- Mordechai Hershman (1888–1940), Russian-Jewish cantor ("hazzan") and singer
- Lisa Hershman (born 1963), American author

== See also ==
- Hirschman, surname
- Hirshman, surname
