= Chief Management Officer of the Department of Defense =

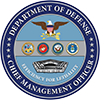
- Seal for the former Chief Management Officer of the DoD

Agency overview
- Formed: 1 February 2018
- Dissolved: 1 January 2021
- Parent department: U.S. Department of Defense; Office of the Secretary of Defense

The chief management officer (CMO) of the United States Department of Defense (DoD) was the third-in-command of the department after the Secretary of Defense and Deputy Secretary of Defense. The position's purpose was to reduce costs by improving the quality and productivity of DoD's business operations. Congress disestablished the CMO position with the passage of the William M. (Mac) Thornberry National Defense Authorization Act for Fiscal Year 2021 effective 1 January 2021.

== Organization ==
The CMO's office contained six "reform leaders" in the areas of logistics and supply chains, real property, community services, human resources, and health care, and a Program Executive Officer for IT Business Systems. The office also oversaw Washington Headquarters Services and the Pentagon Force Protection Agency and contained an Oversight and Compliance Directorate and a Headquarters Support Directorate.

== History ==
In 2005, the U.S. Government Accountability Office recommended that DoD create a CMO position to avoid fraud, waste, abuse, and mismanagement in its reform program. However, DoD declined to create an independent CMO position, and instead assigned CMO responsibilities to the Deputy Secretary of Defense in September 2007. The National Defense Authorization Act for Fiscal Year 2008 codified this into law, and created a Deputy CMO subordinate to the Deputy Secretary. In 2011, the functions of the Business Transformation Agency were transferred to the Deputy CMO when that agency was disestablished.

Creation of the CMO position was mandated by the National Defense Authorization Act for Fiscal Year 2017, and became effective on 1 February 2018. The Deputy CMO position was replaced with the new CMO position. While the Deputy CMO was an internal advisor to the Deputy Secretary, the CMO is more powerful. The CMO was third-in-command of DoD, thus outranking the Secretaries of the Army, Navy, and Air Force, and had authority to order the three officeholders to implement reforms.

The National Defense Authorization Act for Fiscal Year 2018, which was signed into law on 12 December 2017, assigned CMO responsibility for “providing the availability of common, usable, departmentwide data sets and transparency of enterprise data.”

Section 921 of the John S. McCain National Defense Authorization Act for Fiscal Year 2019, which was signed into law on 13 August 2018, required CMO to provide to Congress: 1) a plan, schedule, and cost estimate for conducting reforms within the enterprise business operations of the DoD by February 2019; and 2) a certification that the DoD achieved a 25 percent savings in fiscal year 2020 against the total amount obligated and expended in fiscal year 2019 for four covered activities (civilian resources management, logistics management, services contracting, and real estate management) by January 2020. CMO provided the plan, schedule, and cost estimate in April 2019 but alerted Congress in October 2019 that it would not meet the 25 percent savings targets in all of the four covered activities in FY 2020 against the FY 2019 baseline, and instead forecasted an average 5 percent cost reduction for the four covered activities in the Fourth Estate. In January 2020, CMO provided its final Section 921 report to Congress, citing a total of $37 billion in savings from fiscal year 2017 through fiscal year 2021 across three separate reform efforts: (1) department-wide business reform savings, (2) savings claimed from the FY 2021 Defense-Wide Review, and (3) savings reported in response to section 921 ($1.2 billion). In November 2020, the Government Accountability Office reported to Congress that CMO’s cost savings estimates were not consistently well documented and did not always reflect its definitions of reform.

The National Defense Authorization Act for Fiscal Year 2020 (Pub. L. 116-92) required the Secretary of Defense (SecDef) to conduct an independent assessment of the CMO. The SecDef selected the Defense Business Board (DBB) on 3 February 2020, to conduct the independent assessment. The DBB submitted its report titled "The Chief Management Officer of the Department of Defense: An Assessment" to the SecDef on 1 June 2020. The report stated that since its establishment, the Office of the CMO "has failed to deliver the level of department-wide business transformation envisioned in the legislation, nor met the expectations of multiple SecDef, Deputy Secretary of Defense (DepSecDef), other senior officials, or the Congressional defense leadership." Citing several more reasons, the DBB report concluded that "the OCMO has not delivered the needed transformation to the Department" and that the position was "mostly ineffective."

In June/July 2020, both the Senate Armed Services Committee and House Armed Services Committee put language in their versions of the FY 2021 NDAA to abolish the CMO. In December 2020, responding to language in the proposed FY 2021 NDAA conference report, Lisa Hershman stated, “Congress has given no justification for eliminating the CMO… I’ve never been asked by either the House or the Senate, any subcommittee to make any kind of testimony on the facts. They need to answer to this.” Congress abolished the CMO position with the passage of the William M. (Mac) Thornberry National Defense Authorization Act for Fiscal Year 2021 effective 1 January 2021. On 11 January 2021, DepSecDef David Norquist realigned CMO functions and responsibilities to the Director of Cost Assessment and Program Evaluation, the Under Secretary of Defense (Comptroller), the Chief Information Officer, and the Defense Business Council. He also directed the re-establishment of the Assistant to the Secretary of Defense for Intelligence Oversight (ATSD(IO)) and the Director of Administration and Management (DA&M).

== List of Chief Management Officers of the Department of Defense ==
No.	Image	Name	Took office	Left office	Time in office	Secretaries of Defense serving under:	President serving under:
1		John H. Gibson II	21 February 2018	30 November 2018	282 days	Jim Mattis	Donald Trump
2		Lisa Hershman	1 December 2018	19 December 2019	1 year, 18 days	Jim Mattis; Patrick M. Shanahan (acting); Mark Esper (acting); Richard V. Spencer (acting); Mark Esper; Christopher C. Miller (acting)	Donald Trump
2		Lisa Hershman	19 December 2019	1 January 2021	1 year, 13 days	Jim Mattis; Patrick M. Shanahan (acting); Mark Esper (acting); Richard V. Spencer (acting); Mark Esper; Christopher C. Miller (acting)	Donald Trump
