= MDAP (disambiguation) =

MDAP is Methenmadinone acetate, a progestin medication.

MDAP may also refer to:

- Major Defense Acquisition Program, a U.S. Department of Defense program within the Weapon Systems Acquisition Reform Act of 2009
- Mutual Defense Assistance Program
