= Jamie M. Morin =

American government official (born 1975)

Jamie Morin
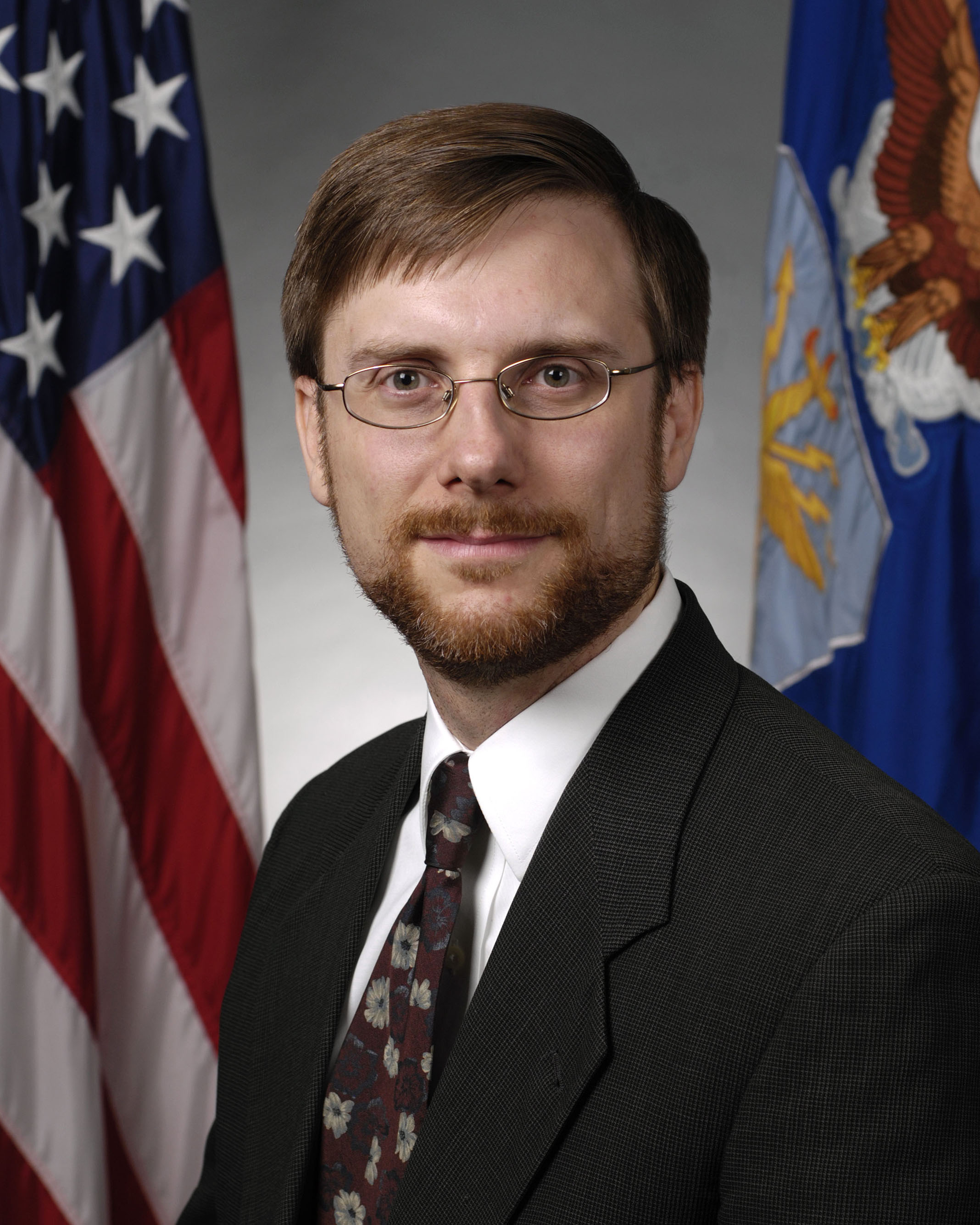
- Official portrait, 2009

Director of Cost Assessment and Program Evaluation
- In office 30 June 2014 – 20 January 2017
- President: Barack Obama
- Preceded by: Christine Fox
- Succeeded by: Robert Daigle

Under Secretary of the Air Force Acting
- In office 3 July 2012 – 28 April 2013
- President: Barack Obama
- Preceded by: Erin C. Conaton
- Succeeded by: Eric Fanning

Assistant Secretary of the Air Force for Financial Management and Comptroller
- In office 19 June 2009 – 25 June 2014
- President: Barack Obama
- Preceded by: John H. Gibson
- Succeeded by: Lisa Disbrow

Personal details
- Born: Jamie Michael Morin; 23 May 1975 (age 51) Southfield, Michigan, U.S.
- Education: Georgetown University (BS); London School of Economics (MA); Yale University (PhD)
- Awards: Eagle Scout (5 Dec 1991)

Jamie Michael Morin (born 23 May 1975) is a former senior official in the United States Department of Defense who served as the Director of Cost Assessment and Program Evaluation from 2014 to 2017. He previously served as acting Under Secretary of the Air Force from 2012 to 2013, and as Assistant Secretary of the Air Force (Financial Management & Comptroller) from 2009 to 2014.

== Education ==
Morin is a native of Detroit, Michigan and a graduate of the University of Detroit Jesuit High School & Academy in 1993. He attended Georgetown University's School of Foreign Service, graduating cum laude in 1996. In 1998, Morin earned a master's degree with distinction in Public Administration and Public Policy from the London School of Economics. In 2003 he received a doctorate in political science from Yale University. His dissertation addressed the political aspects of United States defense priorities in the post-Cold War environment.

== Career ==
In 1995, Morin joined J.E. Austin Associates as a research assistant. He continued with the firm until 2001, serving first as a research associate, then an economist, and finally an economic strategy specialist. During his tenure at J.E. Austin he worked with private firms and international development agencies on economic development projects in Africa, Asia and the Balkans.

In 2001, Morin was selected as a visiting fellow at the Center for Strategic and Budgetary Assessments in Washington, D.C., where he conducted research for The Pentagon's Office of Net Assessment. In 2002 Morin became a national fellow at the University of Virginia's Miller Center for Public Affairs in Charlottesville, Virginia. At the University of Virginia he studied national defense policy and lectured on government policy in undergraduate and graduate courses.

In 2003, Morin became senior defense analyst for the United States Senate Committee on the Budget. He also served as the national security advisor to the committee chairman, Senator Kent Conrad of North Dakota. In this position Morin worked closely with members of the budget committee, and with staff from the armed services committee, foreign relations committee, and appropriations committee to ensure the committees delivered consistent public policy recommendations to the Senate.

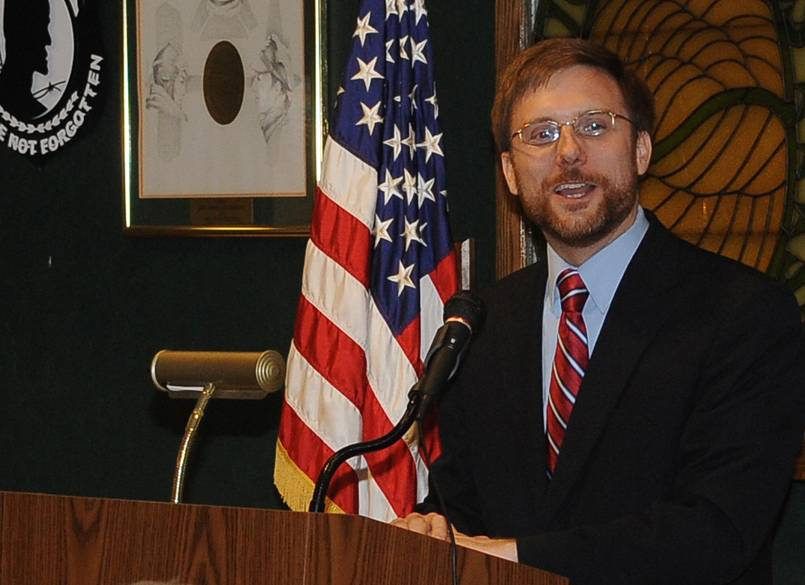
Dr. Morin speaking to a local ASMC chapter

Following the 2008 presidential election, Morin served as a defense policy adviser on President Barack Obama's transition team. On 11 May 2009, President Obama nominated Morin to be Assistant Secretary of the Air Force for Financial Management and Comptroller. On 19 June the United States Senate confirmed him as the 21st Assistant Secretary of the Air Force for Financial Management and Comptroller. Morin was 34 years old at the time of his appointment.

As the Air Force's chief financial officer, Morin was responsible for managing an annual budget of $160 billion. He supported professional training and education programs that help financial managers produce better budget projections and financial analysis for decision makers throughout the Air Force. Morin directed cost estimating and economic analysis programs through the Air Force Cost Analysis Agency. He was also responsible for the Air Force Financial Services Center, which provides financial services to 650,000 Airmen and civilian employees around the world.

In his role as Assistant Secretary, Morin emphasized the need to take care of America's Airmen. He placed the high priority on strengthening the Air Force's nuclear enterprise, which was demonstrated by his strong support for the stand-up of Air Force Global Strike Command. Morin promoted thoughtful decision-making at all levels within the Air Force and has fostered a culture of continuous improvement. He encouraged Air Force comptrollers to become their commander's trusted advisor in order to ensure available funds are used to achieve the greatest impact on Air Force operations and weapon system acquisition programs.

As Acting Under Secretary of the Air Force, Morin was responsible for Department of the Air Force affairs on behalf of the Secretary of the Air Force, including the organizing, training, equipping and providing for the welfare of its more than 333,000 active duty men and women, 178,000 Air National Guard and the Air Force Reserve members, 182,000 civilians, and their families. He also oversaw the Air Force's annual budget of more than $110 billion and serves as acting Secretary of the Air Force in the Secretary's absence. As acting Under Secretary, Dr. Morin also served as the Chief Management Officer of the Air Force, the senior Air Force energy official, and the focal point for space policy issues within Air Force Headquarters.

On 25 June 2014, the Senate confirmed Morin to be Director of Cost Assessment and Program Evaluation. He served in that role until the end of the Obama administration on 20 January 2017. During his tenure as CAPE director, Morin was associated with efforts to develop program plans and cost estimates for the B-21 bomber and Ground Based Strategic Deterrent ICBM program, to curtail production of the Littoral Combat Ship and instead produce a more powerful frigate, to use special groups like the Strategic Capabilities Office to develop innovative upgrades to existing systems, and to modernize DOD contract cost reporting methods.

In March 2017, he joined The Aerospace Corporation as executive director of the Center for Space Policy and Strategy and vice president of Defense Systems Operations. The Aerospace Corporation is a California nonprofit that operates a federally funded R&D center (FFRDC) focused on national security space; the Center for Space Policy and Strategy is a specialized branch within the corporation established to promote the development of well-informed, technically defensible, and forward-looking space and technology policy.

== Professional associations ==
Morin is a member of the Air Force Association and holds the Certified Defense Financial Manager certification with acquisition specialty of the American Society of Military Comptrollers. In 2013, he was named as a "Young Global Leader" by the World Economic Forum. In addition, he is a member of the Council on Foreign Relations.

Political offices
Preceded by John H. Gibson	Assistant Secretary of the Air Force for Financial Management and Comptroller; 2009–2014	Succeeded by Lisa Disbrow
Preceded by Erin C. Conaton	Under Secretary of the Air Force; Acting; 2012–2013	Succeeded by Eric Fanning
Preceded by Christine Fox	Director of Cost Assessment and Program Evaluation; 2014–2017	Succeeded by Robert Daigle
