= Bradley M. Berkson =

American businessman and former government official

Brad Berkson
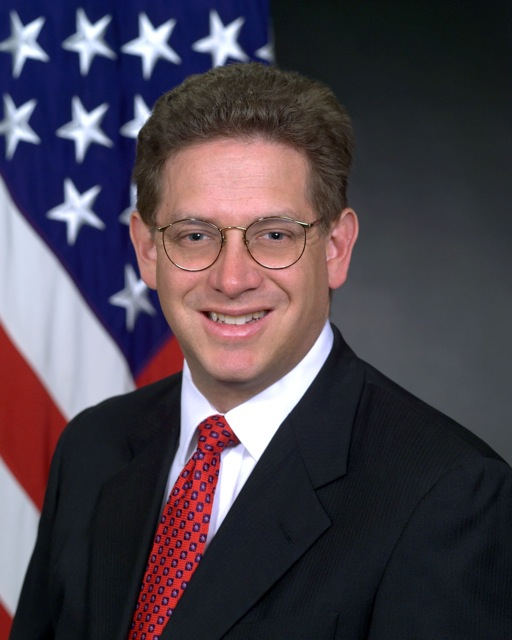
- Official Photo

Director of Program Analysis and Evaluation
- In office June 6, 2005 – April 3, 2009
- President: George W. Bush; Barack Obama
- Preceded by: Kenneth J. Krieg
- Succeeded by: Christine Fox

Acting Deputy Under Secretary of Defense for Logistics and Materiel Readiness
- In office January 2, 2004 – August 8, 2005
- President: George W. Bush
- Preceded by: Diane Morales
- Succeeded by: Phillip J. "Jack" Bell

Personal details
- Born: February 26, 1963 (age 63) Gallup, New Mexico, U.S.
- Party: Republican
- Education: University of Tulsa (BS); Harvard University (MBA)

Brad Berkson (born February 26, 1963) is an American businessman and former government official who served as the Director of Cost Assessment and Program Evaluation in the United States Department of Defense. Berkson also served as the Acting Deputy Under Secretary of Defense for Logistics and Materiel Readiness, now termed Assistant Secretary of Defense for Sustainment. Berkson led Secretary of Defense Robert Gates' Intelligence, Surveillance, & Reconnaissance Task Force. Berkson served in the Bush administration and remained in the Obama administration until April, 2009.

== Early life and education ==
Berkson was born in Gallup, New Mexico. He graduated from the University of Tulsa in 1985 with a B.S. in petroleum engineering and earned an MBA from Harvard Business School in 1991.

== Career ==
He was an engineer for Exxon Corporation who worked on the Prudhoe Bay field on Alaska's North Slope. After Harvard, Berkson joined McKinsey & Company, where he became a partner in 1997. After starting a company in 2000 which sold to N E W Customer Service Companies Inc six months later, he was named president at NEW.

In February 2003, Berkson joined the Office of the Secretary of Defense at the Pentagon. In 2004, he became the senior logistician for Secretary Donald Rumsfeld, a post now titled Assistant Secretary of Defense for Sustainment. In May 2005, Berkson was chosen by Rumsfeld to serve as Director of Program Analysis and Evaluation, a position retitled Director of Cost Assessment and Program Evaluation. He served in that post through the end of the Bush administration and assisted Secretary Robert Gates throughout the transition to the Obama administration until April 2009. During his last year at the Pentagon Secretary Robert Gates tapped Berkson to head his Intelligence, Surveillance, & Reconnaissance Task Force.

In April 2009, Berkson left the Pentagon. He joined several boards including Boeing Defense, Space & Security, DryFire, SecureNet, and GEM Mobile Treatment Services. He chaired both the National Defense Business Institute and CEVA Government Services, a subsidiary of CEVA Logistics. In 2014, he became CEO of N12 Technologies, the first industrial scale producer of vertically aligned carbon nanotubes for use in strengthening and high performance carbon fiber reinforced plastic materials. He left N12 in 2018 and became a senior advisor to various startups including Wheeli, a long-distance ride-sharing app, and SeatAssignMate.com, an interactive e-mail SaaS company.

Berkson joined RocketStar, Inc. in 2021 as President. He later served as COO and CEO of Miles Space, Inc. He is currently the CEO of FANTEC, a communications signal processing company.

== Honors and awards ==
Berkson was awarded the Department of Defense Medal for Distinguished Public Service in 2009. That same year he was also named a Significant Sig by the Sigma Chi fraternity.
