= Michael H. Decker =

American government official

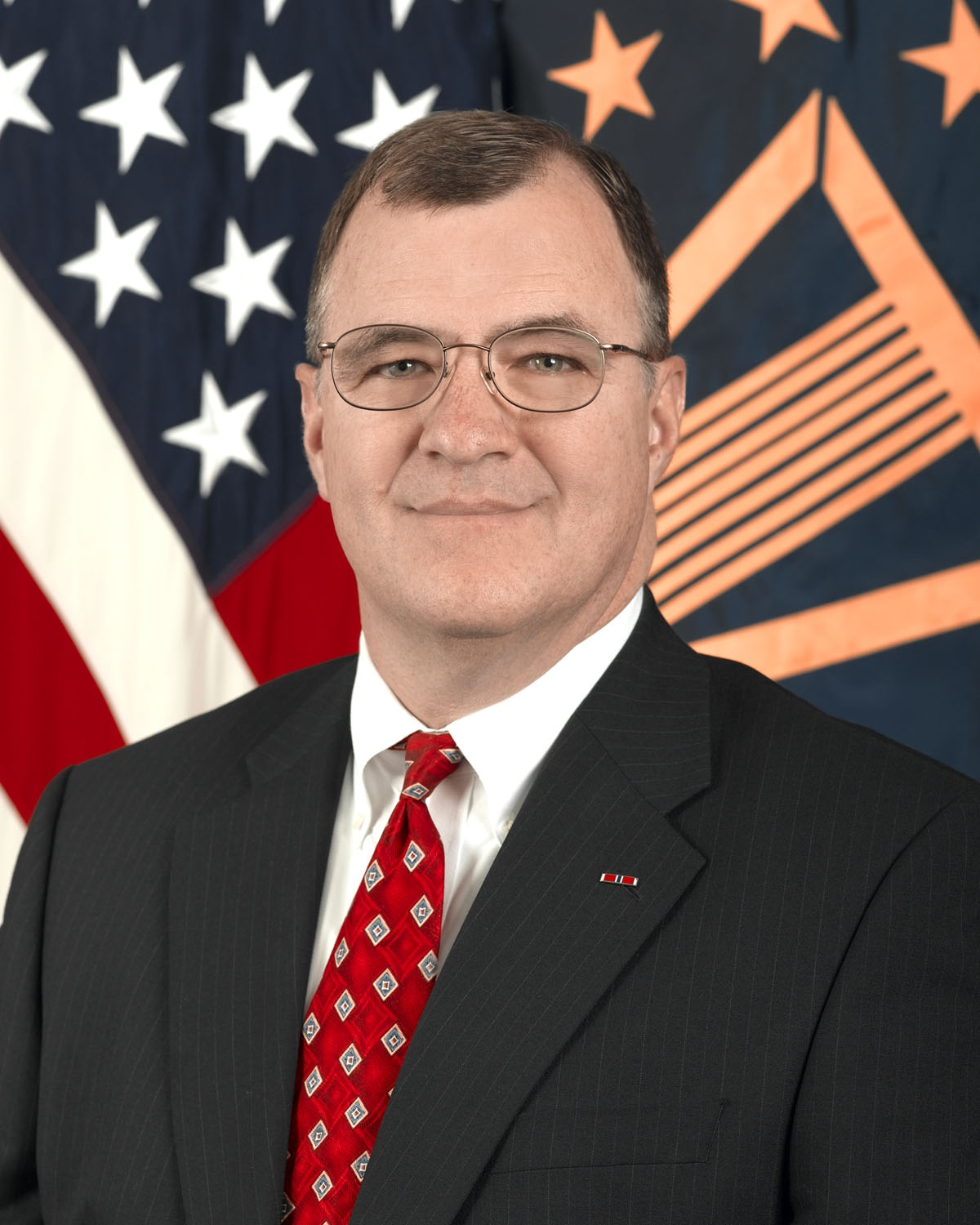

5th Assistant to the Secretary of Defense for Intelligence Oversight
- In office September 2009 – February 2014
- President: Barack Obama
- Secretary: Robert M. Gates; Leon Panetta; Chuck Hagel
- Preceded by: William Dugan

Director of Intelligence, USMC
- In office January 2004 – June 2005
- President: George W. Bush
- Preceded by: MajGen Michael E. Ennis, USMC
- Succeeded by: MajGen Richard M. Lake, USMC

Personal details
- Education: University of Notre Dame (B.A.); Georgetown University (M.A.); National Intelligence University (M.S.)

Michael H. Decker was the Assistant to the Secretary of Defense for Intelligence Oversight. from September 2009 to February 2014. Before that he was assistant director of Intelligence, Marine Corps Intelligence, United States Marine Corps. He served as Director of Intelligence during Operation Iraqi Freedom II (OIF II) from January 2004 to June 2005.

== Early life and education ==
Decker was raised in Florissant, Missouri and obtained his Bachelor of Business Administration degree from the University of Notre Dame and later earned his Master of Arts in government/national security studies from Georgetown University. He also holds a Master of Science degree in Strategic intelligence from the National Defense Intelligence College.

== Military career ==
Decker was commissioned as a second lieutenant in the United States Marine Corps and served as an infantry platoon commander during operations to the Mediterranean Sea. In 1982, he was deployed as an assistant battalion operations officer to Beirut, Lebanon, as part of the Multinational Force in Lebanon, a period that included the 1983 US embassy bombing in Beirut. After returning to the United States, Decker served as an infantry company commander and later as assistant operations officer for an expeditionary unit in Honduras. Reassigned to Headquarters, United States Marine Corps, Decker served as the Marine Corps Security Force/Marine Security Guard policy and program officer.

Decker next served as an intelligence officer with a Marine Expeditionary Unit in the Western Pacific and later as a Marine Expeditionary Force production/analysis officer in an all-source fusion center, where he co-ordinated all intelligence aspects of marine participation in Central Command theater contingency planning and exercises.

Decker was deployed to Saudi Arabia as a senior intelligence analyst, supervising enemy order of battle analysis and co-ordinating political analysis and theater intelligence liaison for Marine Forces Central Command during the Gulf War. Decker was medically retired in 1991.

== Post-government ==
Decker is the Director, Intelligence and Security Programs at Operational Intelligence, LLC, a QinetiQ-US company.

Earlier Decker served as the Director, Marine Forces Programs and a Senior International/Defense Research Analyst, at the RAND Corporation and a Senior Fellow at the Institute for Defense Analyses.

Decker has served as a Defense Counterintelligence and Security Agency-approved Outside Director for SDL Government and as a Director for the Intelligence and National Security Alliance (INSA). He has also served on the AFCEA Intelligence Committee.

== Awards and decorations ==
Decker's awards include:

- National Intelligence Distinguished Service Medal
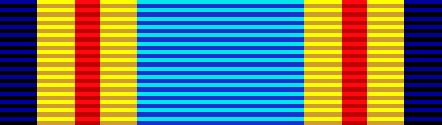
- Defense Intelligence Director's Award
- Distinguished and Meritorious Presidential Rank Awards
- Secretary of Defense Meritorious Civilian Service Award

Decker's military decorations include:

- Bronze Star
- Meritorious Service Medal
- Navy & Marine Corps Commendation Medal

== Personal life ==
Decker is married and has two sons.

Decker is an adjunct associate professor in the Center for Security Studies at Georgetown University.

== Publications ==
- Michael H. Decker and William Mackenzie “The Birth and Early Years of Marine Corps Intelligence,” Marine Corps History, Volume 5, Number 2 (Winter 2020) p. 39-53
- Maj Michael H. Decker, USMC (Ret) and Sgt William Mackenzie, USMC (Ret), “Marine Corps Intelligence, the Interwar Years,” Marine Corps Gazette, Volume 103, Number 9 (September 2019) p. 10
- Cortney Weinbaum, John V. Parachini, Richard S. Girven, Michael H. Decker, Richard C. Baffa, "Perspectives and Opportunities in Intelligence for U.S. Leaders," RAND Corp, Document Number: PE-287-OSD, 2018
- George Nacouzi, J.D. Williams, Brian Dolan, Anne Stickells, David Luckey, Colin Ludwig, Jia Xu, Yuliya Shokh, Daniel M. Gerstein, Michael H. Decker, "Assessment of the Proliferation of Certain Remotely Piloted Aircraft Systems," RAND Corporation, Document Number: RR-2369-JS, 2018
- Jeff Hagen, Lillian Ablon, John A. Ausink, Jeffrey R. Brown, Michael H. Decker, Quentin E. Hodgson, Myron Hura, Mary Lee, Brynn Tannehil, "Piecing Together the Puzzle: Building Cyber-Resilient Air Force Missions," RAND Corp, Document Number: RR-3203-AF, 2021
- Michael H. Decker, Anthony Atler, Meagan L. Smith, William Marcellino, "Expeditionary Ground Reconnaissance, A Mission Analysis," RAND Corporation, Document Number: RR-1685-USMC, 2016
- Decker, Michael H; "USMC Intel: 1994-2008", MCIA Inc INTSUM; autumn 2014; vol. XXVI, issue 1
- Decker, Michael H; "Assessing the Intelligence Effort", Marine Corps Gazette; vol. 75, no. 9 (September 1991), p. 22
- Decker, Michael H; "The MAGTF and Low-Intensity Conflict", Marine Corps Gazette; vol. 72, no. 3 (March 1988), p. 45
- Decker, Michael H; Batts, Christopher B.; "Marine Corps Counterintelligence Support to the Warfighter, Past, Present and Future", American Intelligence Journal; vol. 20, no. 1&2 (winter 2000–2001)
- Decker, Michael H; "Three MAFs for the Corps", U.S. Naval Institute Proceedings; vol 113 (November 1987), p. 74
- Decker, Michael H; Jeffries, James H, III; "Platoon - The Movie and Law of War Training", Marine Corps Gazette; vol. 71, no. 4 (April 1987), p. 40
- Decker, Michael H; "On Women, Combat, and Leadership", Marine Corps Gazette; vol. 75, no. 10 (October 1991), p. 89
- Decker, Mike; "The Long Run", Scholastic, Notre Dame, Indiana, vol. 121, no. 7 (March 21, 1980) p 26 http://www.archives.nd.edu/Scholastic/VOL_0121/VOL_0121_ISSUE_0007.pdf
