= Rodric Bray =

American politician from Indiana (born 1969)

Rod Bray
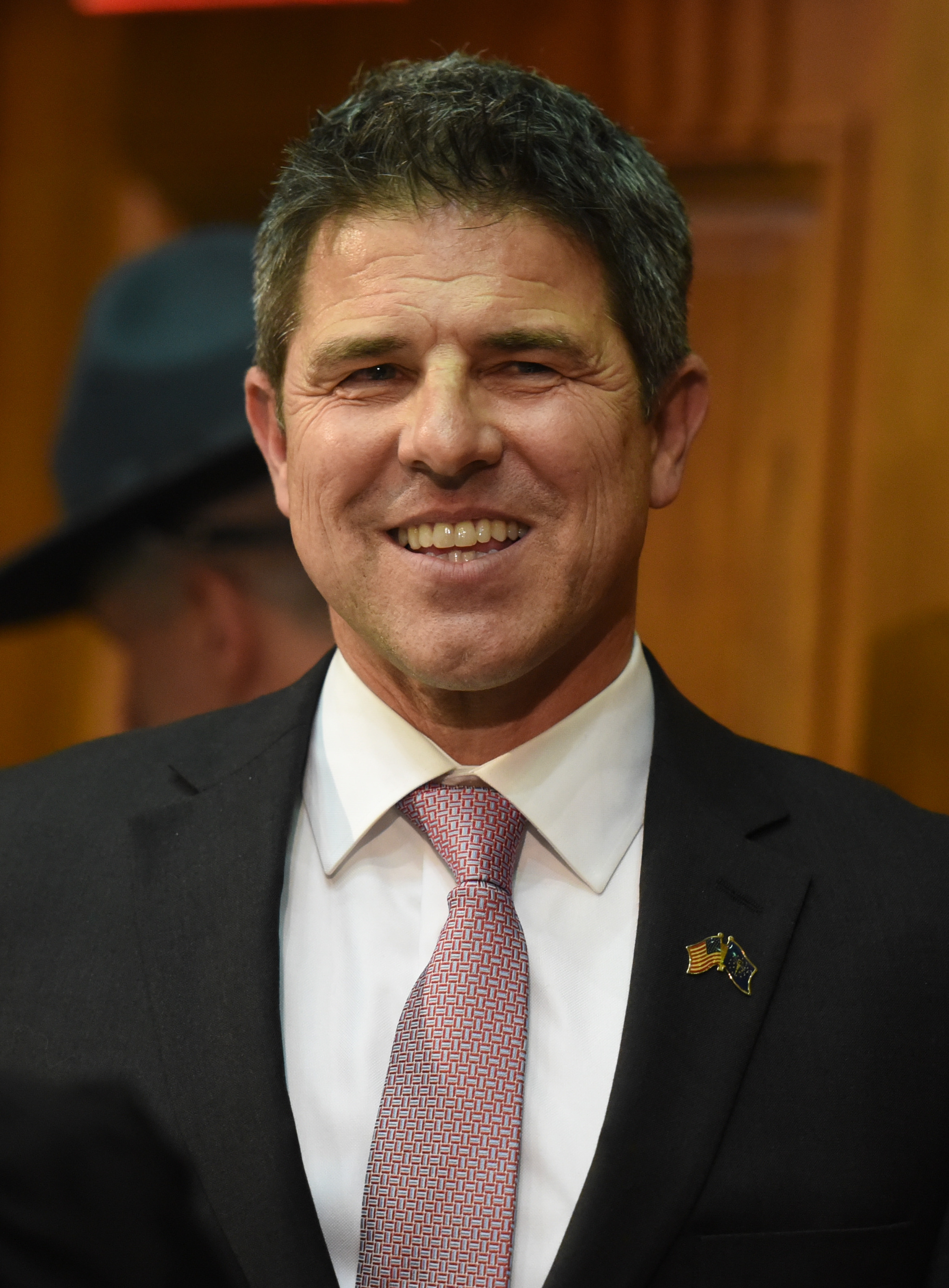
- Bray in 2020

President pro tempore of the Indiana Senate
- In office November 7, 2018 – November 17, 2026
- Preceded by: David C. Long
- Succeeded by: Chris Garten

Majority Leader of the Indiana Senate
- In office January 2, 2018 – November 7, 2018
- Preceded by: Brandt Hershman
- Succeeded by: Mark Messmer

Member of the Indiana Senate from the 37th district
- Incumbent
- Assumed office November 20, 2012
- Preceded by: Richard Bray

City Attorney for Martinsville
- In office 2003–2007
- Appointed by: Shannon Buskirk
- Preceded by: Robert St. Clair
- Succeeded by: Roger Coffin

Personal details
- Born: 1969 (age 56–57) Martinsville, Indiana, U.S.
- Party: Republican
- Spouse: Kelly
- Children: 2
- Relatives: Richard Bray (Father); William G. Bray (Grandfather)
- Education: Indiana University, Bloomington (BA); Valparaiso University (JD)
- Website: State Senate website Campaign website

Rodric D. "Rod" Bray (born 1969) is an American politician serving in the Indiana Senate since 2012 and as president pro tempore since 2018. Bray represents the 37th state Senate district, which comprises all of Morgan County and a portion of Johnson, Owen and Putnam counties. He is a member of the Republican Party.

In 2025, Bray drew national attention as one of 21 Republican senators to vote against mid-decade redistricting in Indiana, which would have net Republicans an additional 2 seats in the U.S. House of Representatives, prompting criticism from national and state Republicans such as president Donald Trump and governor Mike Braun.

== Early life and education ==
Rodric was born to Maurine D. (née Sweet) and Richard Bray in 1969. His father, Richard, served in the Indiana House of Representatives from 1974 to 1992 and in the Indiana Senate from to 1994 to 2012, where he was the Assistant Majority Caucus Chair. His grandfather William G. Bray was a member of the United States House of Representatives from 1951 to 1975, representing Indiana's 6th and 7th congressional districts.

Bray is a graduate of Martinsville High School. He attended Indiana University Bloomington, where he received his Bachelor of Arts in History in 1991. Bray also attended Valparaiso University, where he graduated with his Juris Doctor from the Valparaiso University School of Law in 1994.

== Early career ==
Bray was a deputy prosecuting attorney in Morgan County, Indiana until 1997. He then entered private practice, where he was an attorney with Harris & Currens, and was elected Chairman of the Morgan County Republican Party on August 18, 1998, after the incumbent party chair, Joan Gray, resigned. He served as chair until March 2005. He was succeeded by Martin Weaver as County Party Chair.

On August 18, 2003, Bray was appointed city attorney of Martinsville by Mayor Shannon Buskirk, after the death of incumbent Robert St. Clair. Bray served as city attorney until 2007. He was succeeded by Roger Coffin as City Attorney.

After serving as city attorney, Bray became a member of the Morgan County Election Board and the general counsel to the Martinsville Plan Commission and Board of Zoning. Bray has also served on the board of directors for Home Bank since 2008.

== Indiana State Senate ==
After his father Richard decided to retire from the Indiana State Senate after five terms, Rodric Bray declared his candidacy for Indiana's 37th State Senate district, officially filing to run on January 24, 2012. Bray faced insurance agent and Morgan County Councilman Ryan Goodwin in the Republican primary. Bray defeated Goodwin 10,115 votes (54.8%) to 8,333 votes (46.2%), in the May 8, 2012 Republican primary. Bray went on to face Democratic nominee Jim Cahill, a cement truck driver and Teamsters local president, in the general election. Bray prevailed in the November 6 general election with 36,959 votes (71.2%) to Cahill's votes 14,947 (28.8%). Bray was sworn into office on November 20, 2012, by Chief Justice of the Indiana Supreme Court Brent Dickson. Bray's district includes all of Morgan County and parts of Johnson, Owen and Putnam counties.

Bray was a member of the Senate committees on Corrections and Criminal Law, Health and Provider Services, Local Government, and Utilities.

In January 2018, Senate Republicans elected Bray Senate majority leader, after Brandt Hershman retired. In May 2018, Senate Republicans preliminary elected Bray to the post of Senate president pro tempore and Mark Messmer to replace Bray as Senate Majority Leader. In the caucus balloting, Bray reportedly won by a single vote over Travis Holdman. Bray was officially elected and took office in November 2018, at the opening of the legislative session. The Republicans enjoy a two-thirds supermajority in both the state House and state Senate.

As Senate president pro tem, Bray opposed proposals to legalize marijuana in Indiana. He resisted calls for an increase in schoolteacher pay. In 2019, Bray supported a hate crimes bill that provided that judges could considered "bias" in sentencing; with Bray's support, a majority of Senate Republicans had amended the proposal to strip a list of protected victim traits from the original bill, including race, sexual orientation, and gender identity, from the bill, drawing criticism from Democrats, some Republican legislators, Republican Governor Eric Holcomb, and civil rights advocates.

In 2020, during the COVID-19 pandemic in Indiana, Bray sent a letter to Indiana school leaders, saying that public schools that did not offer an in-person education option (as opposed to virtual education) risked major cuts in state funding, which could amount to millions of dollars, depending on the student population of the school district.

In the 2025–2026 United States redistricting debate, Bray announced that he would not convene the senate chamber even though Governor Mike Braun had called a special session due to a lack of votes. This led to stark criticism from President Donald Trump who called Bray "weak" and "pathetic" and needed to be primaried. A session was eventually convened and redistricting in Indiana was defeated in the Senate, with Bray among the Republicans voting against it.

== Personal life ==
Bray currently resides in Martinsville, Indiana with his wife, Kelly, and their two sons. Bray attends the First Global Methodist Church of Martinsville, where he serves as a member of the Pastor Parish Committee and is a Sunday school teacher.

Indiana Senate
Preceded by Richard Bray	Member of the Indiana Senate from the 37th district 2012–present	Incumbent
Preceded by Brandt Hershman	Majority Leader of the Indiana Senate; 2018	Succeeded by Mark Messmer
Preceded by David C. Long	President pro tempore of the Indiana Senate; 2018–present	Incumbent
