= Richard Bray =

American politician from Indiana (born 1934)

Member of the Indiana Senate from the 37th district
- In office November 4, 1992 – November 7, 2012
- Preceded by: Edward A. Pease
- Succeeded by: Rodric Bray

Member of the Indiana House of Representatives from the 47th district
- In office November 3, 1982 – November 4, 1992
- Preceded by: Richard Allen Thompson
- Succeeded by: Ralph M. Foley

Member of the Indiana House of Representatives from the 52nd district
- In office November 6, 1974 – November 3, 1982
- Preceded by: Jack Norman Smitherman
- Succeeded by: Eugene Raymond Leeuw

Personal details
- Born: March 1, 1934 (age 92)
- Party: Republican
- Spouse: Maurine D. Sweet
- Children: 3, including Rodric
- Education: Indiana University (AB, JD)

Richard Bray (born March 1, 1934) is an American politician who served as a Republican member of the Indiana Senate, representing Senate District 37, which includes all or parts of Morgan, Owen, Putnam, Clay, Johnson and Monroe counties. Bray was first elected to the Indiana Senate in 1992, and served in the Senate until 2012, when he was succeeded by his son, Rodric Bray. He also served in the Indiana House of Representatives from 1974 to 1992 and as the Morgan County Prosecuting Attorney from 1958 to 1970.

Bray served as the Assistant Majority Caucus Chair and chaired the Senate Judiciary Committee. He also served as the Ranking Member of the Commission on the Courts.

Born in Indianapolis, Indiana, Bray is the son of former member of the United States House of Representatives, William G. Bray. Bray holds AB and JD degrees from Indiana University and practices law in Martinsville, Indiana.
