= Hirshman =

Hirshman is a surname. 'Hirsh' comes from 'Hirsch', German Deer. Notable people with the surname include:

- Elliot Hirshman (born 1961), American psychologist
- Linda Hirshman (1944–2023), American lawyer and author
- Louis Hirshman (1905–1986), American artist

== See also ==
- Hirschman, surname
- Herschmann, surname
