= Erin C. Conaton =

American politician (born 1970)

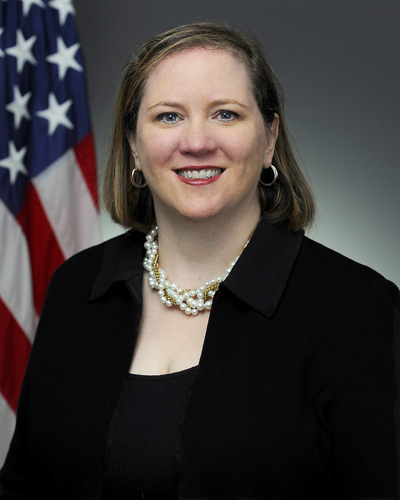

6th Under Secretary of Defense for Personnel and Readiness
- In office June 8, 2012 – December 31, 2012
- President: Barack Obama
- Preceded by: Clifford L. Stanley
- Succeeded by: Jessica L. Wright

23rd Under Secretary of the Air Force
- In office March 15, 2010 – January 23, 2012
- President: Barack Obama
- Preceded by: Vacant
- Succeeded by: Jamie M. Morin

Personal details
- Born: September 26, 1970 (age 55) Hackensack, New Jersey, U.S.
- Party: Democratic

Erin Cathleen Conaton (born September 26, 1970) is a former United States Under Secretary of Defense for Personnel and Readiness. She previously served as Under Secretary of the Air Force.

== Education ==
Conaton was born in Hackensack, New Jersey and grew up in Rutherford, New Jersey. After graduating from Immaculate Heart Academy in the Township of Washington, Bergen County, New Jersey, Conaton was educated at Georgetown University, receiving a B.S. in foreign service in 1992.

== Career ==
She spent 1992-93 as a financial analyst at Salomon Brothers in New York City, and then as a director of client services at Yield Enhancement Strategists, Inc. She then became a graduate student at Fletcher School of Law and Diplomacy at Tufts University, serving as a graduate fellow at the United States National Security Council in 1994, and received her Master of Arts in Law and Diplomacy (MALD) from the Fletcher School in 1995. She spent 1995 as an associate at the Overseas Private Investment Corporation. From 1996 to 1997, she completed an International Security Studies Fellowship at Tufts University, and then completed a graduate fellowship at the Central Intelligence Agency in 1998.

Conaton worked as research staff director and research associate for the US Commission on National Security/21st Century from 1998 to 2001. From 2001 to 2005, she was a member of the professional staff of the United States House Committee on Armed Services. In 2005, she became the Armed Service Committee's Minority Staff Director, holding that position until 2007, when she became the full committee's staff director. In this position, Conaton served as primary adviser on defense matters to the Chairman and 61 other Members; directed overall operations, and strategic planning; and led the substantive agenda of the committee, to include drafting and overseeing the National Defense Authorization Act.

== Obama Administration ==
On November 10, 2009, President of the United States Barack Obama nominated Conaton to be United States Under Secretary of the Air Force, an office that had been vacant since the resignation of Ronald M. Sega on August 31, 2007. Conaton was confirmed by the Senate on March 4, 2010, and sworn into office on March 15. As Under Secretary of the Air Force, Conaton was responsible for the affairs of the Department of the Air Force including the organizing, training, equipping and providing for the welfare of its 680,000 members and their families. She also served as the Air Force Chief Management Officer, oversaw the Air Force's annual budget of more than $119 billion, and served as acting Secretary of the Air Force in the Secretary's absence.

On January 23, 2012, President Obama nominated Conaton to be Under Secretary of Defense for Personnel and Readiness, and she was appointed to the position on June 8, 2012, following her confirmation by the United States Senate. As Under Secretary of Defense for Personnel and Readiness, Conaton served as the senior policy advisor to the United States Secretary of Defense and Deputy Secretary of Defense on all matters concerning recruitment, career development, military health care, and pay and benefits for 1.4 million active duty military personnel, 1.3 million National Guard and Reserve personnel, and over 782,000 Department of Defense civilians. She was also responsible for overseeing the overall state of military readiness.

On December 31, 2012, Conaton resigned her position as Under Secretary of Defense for Personnel and Readiness citing a desire to return to private life. She had been on medical leave since October. In her letter to her staff she said, "I believe this is a good moment for me to return to private life and to continue to contribute to our national security from outside government.”

Government offices
Preceded by Clifford L. Stanley	United States Under Secretary of Defense for Personnel and Readiness; June 8, 2012 – December 31, 2012	Succeeded by Jessica L. Wright
