= Robert Daigle =

American government official

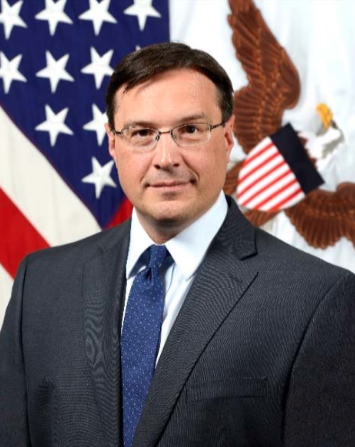

Director of Cost Assessment and Program Evaluation
- In office August 7, 2017 – May 18, 2019
- President: Donald Trump
- Preceded by: Jamie M. Morin
- Succeeded by: Susanna Blume

Director of Program Resources and Information Systems Management Division, Department of Defense
- President: George W. Bush

Personal details
- Education: University of Vermont; Columbia Business School; Georgetown University

Robert Daigle is an American government official who served as Director of Cost Assessment and Program Evaluation for the United States Department of Defense. Prior to assuming that role, he was a staff member on the United States House Committee on Armed Services. Daigle served as a soldier in the United States Army and was Executive Director of the Military Compensation and Retirement Modernization Commission.
