= John H. Gibson =

American government official (born 1959)

John H. Gibson II
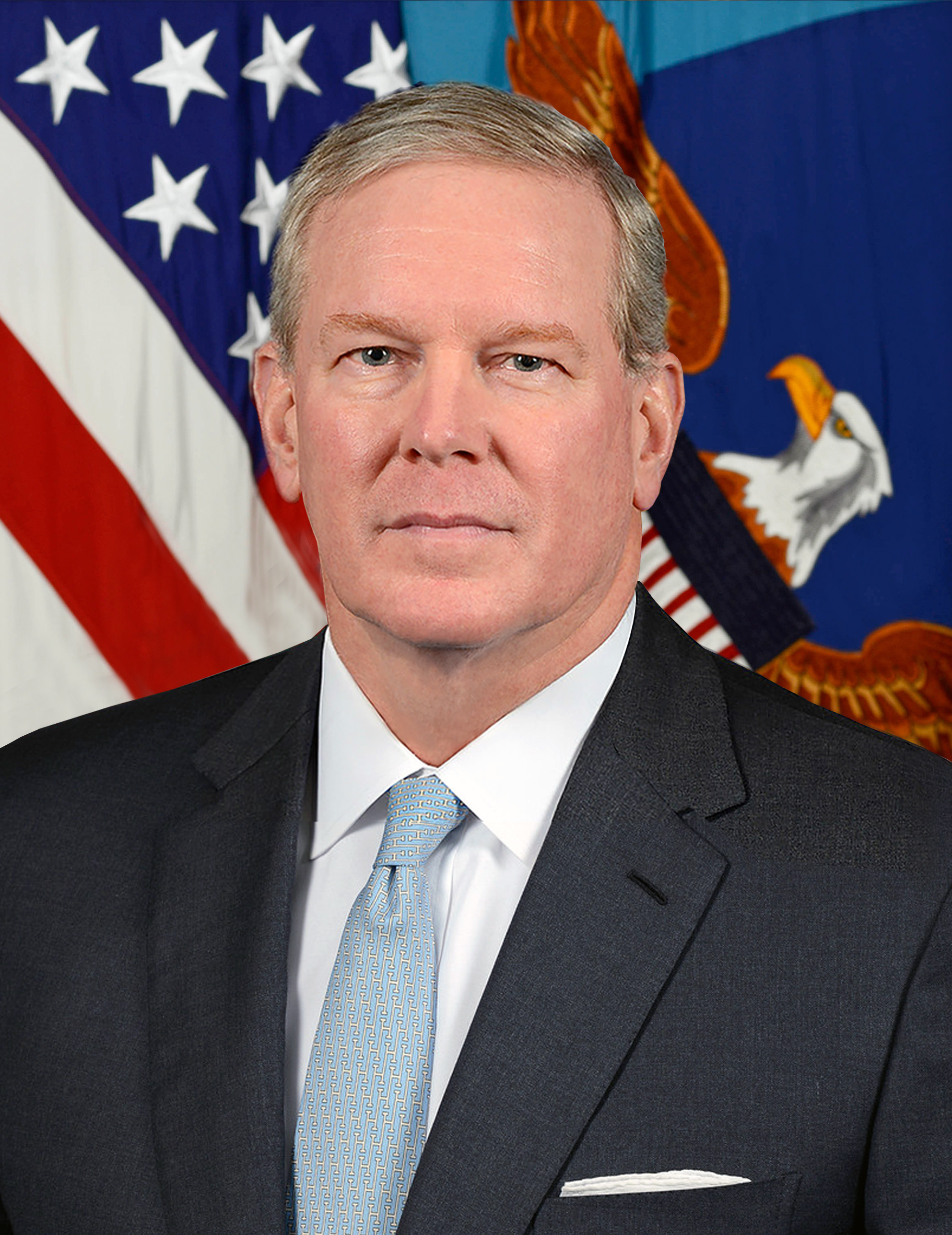
- Official portrait, 2018

Chief Management Officer of the Department of Defense
- In office February 21, 2018 – November 30, 2018
- President: Donald Trump
- Preceded by: Position established
- Succeeded by: Lisa Hershman

Deputy Chief Management Officer of the Department of Defense
- In office November 29, 2017 – February 21, 2018
- President: Donald Trump
- Preceded by: Peter Levine
- Succeeded by: Lisa Hershman

20th Assistant Secretary of the Air Force (Financial Management & Comptroller)
- In office January 15, 2008 – January 20, 2009
- President: George W. Bush
- Preceded by: Michael Montelongo
- Succeeded by: Jamie M. Morin

Personal details
- Born: John Holden Gibson II; February 15, 1959 (age 67) Flushing, New York, U.S.
- Party: Republican
- Education: University of Texas at Austin (BA, BBA); University of Dallas (MBA)

John Holden Gibson II (born February 15, 1959) is an American businessman and government official who served as the Chief Management Officer of the United States Department of Defense in 2018. A member of the Republican Party, he served as the Deputy Chief Management Officer of the Department of Defense from 2017 to 2018. He also served as the Assistant Secretary of the Air Force (Financial Management & Comptroller) from 2008 to 2009.

== Education ==
Gibson attended the University of Texas at Austin, graduating in 1981. He received two undergraduate degrees, a Bachelor of Business Administration with a specialty in finance and a Bachelor of Arts in economics. In 1994, Gibson earned a Master of Business Administration from the University of Dallas.

== Business career ==
Gibson began his executive career with Westgate Fabrics, Inc. He served as chief financial officer, chief operating officer, and executive vice president. In these positions Gibson was responsible for company finances, operational performance, and strategic planning. Gibson then moved to Galbraith Electric Company where he went through the same job progression of chief financial officer to chief operating officer to vice president. As vice president, Gibson led the company through a business merger. After the merger, he remained with the new company, assisting with business operations and acquisition strategy. Prior to entering public service, Gibson was managing director of the DK Consulting Group of Abilene, Texas, where he helped large corporations plan business acquisitions and mergers. As a consultant, he specialized in banking, construction, distribution, retail sales, and health care acquisitions and mergers. Gibson was also a member of the Abilene Chamber of Commerce’s Military Affairs Committee from 1998 until 2006.

Gibson was CEO of XCOR Aerospace from 2015 to June 2017.

== Public service ==
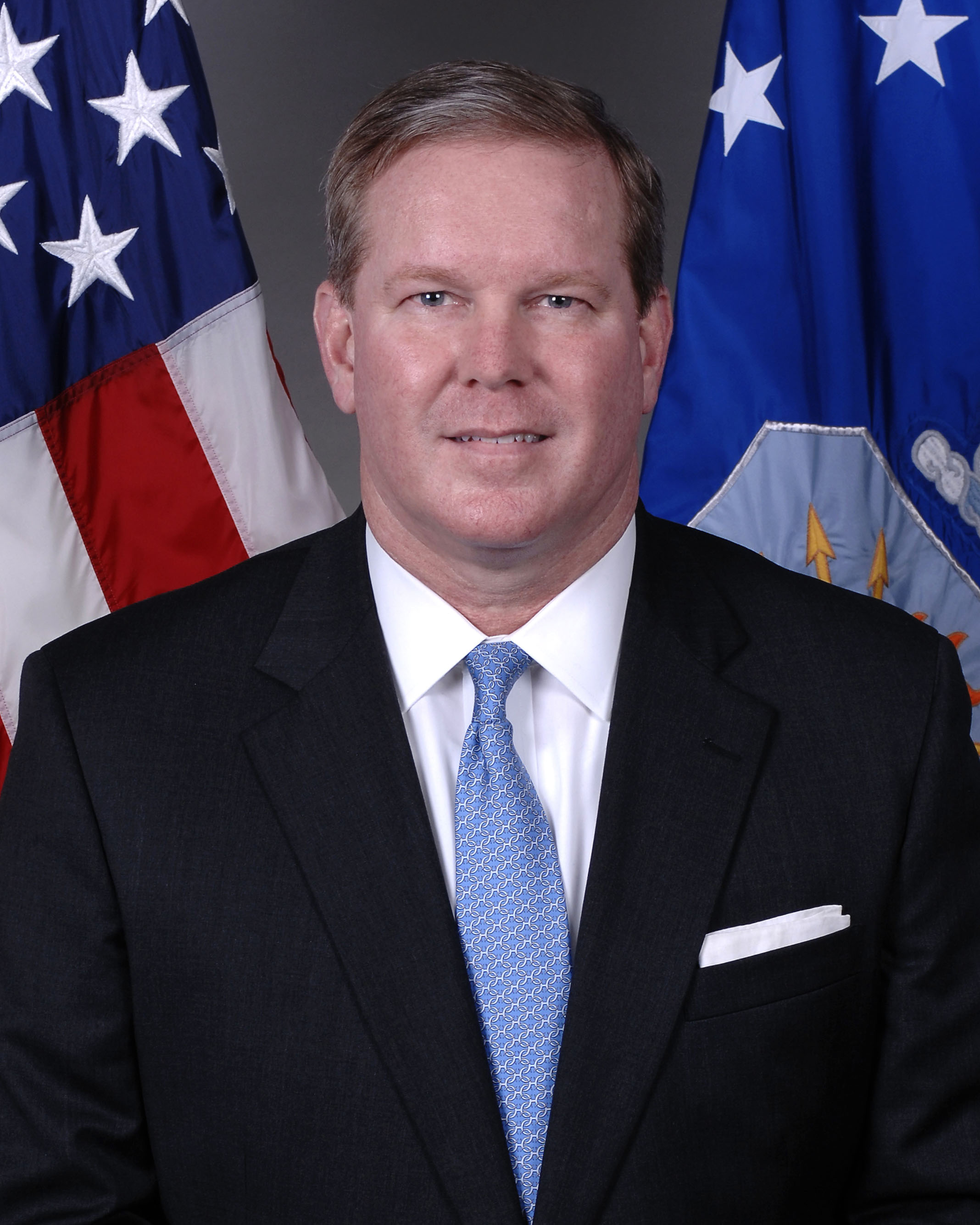
Gibson's Air Force portrait

In February 2006, President George W. Bush appointed Gibson to the position of Deputy Under Secretary of Defense for Management Reform. In this role, he was responsible for promoting management efficiency and streamlining financial operations within the Department of Defense. To accomplish this, he worked closely with the Department of Defense Inspector General, the Government Accountability Office, the Office of Management and Budget, and the United States Congress. Gibson also served as acting Deputy Under Secretary of Defense for Financial Management from July 2006 through July 2007.

On October 24, 2007, President Bush nominated Gibson to be Assistant Secretary of the Air Force for Financial Management and Comptroller. The United States Senate confirmed his nomination on December 20, 2007. On January 15, 2008, Gibson was sworn in as the 20th Assistant Secretary of the Air Force for Financial Management and Comptroller by Secretary of the Air Force Michael W. Wynne. During his tenure as the Air Force's chief financial officer, Gibson was responsible for managing an annual operating budget of $124 billion. He supported professional training and education programs to help financial managers produce better cost estimates, budget projections and financial analysis for decision makers throughout the Air Force. Gibson also expanded the Air Force Financial Services Center, opening a customer call center to provide financial services to 700,000 Airmen and civilian employees around the world.

In June 2017, President Donald Trump nominated Gibson to be Deputy Chief Management Officer for the Department of Defense. His nomination was confirmed by a 91 to 7 vote in the United States Senate on November 7, 2017. Gibson was responsible for overseeing the integration and coordination of business operations within the Department of Defense. In January 2018, he was nominated for promotion to the newly created office of Chief Management Officer of the Department of Defense. This nomination was confirmed by voice vote of the Senate on February 15, 2018. On November 5, 2018, Gibson submitted his resignation from the office of Chief Management Officer of the Department of Defense effective November 30.

== Professional associations ==
Gibson is a member of the Air Force Association and the American Society of Military Comptrollers. In addition, he actively supports the Association of Government Accountants.

Political offices
Preceded by Michael Montelongo	Assistant Secretary of the Air Force (Financial Management & Comptroller); 2008–2009	Succeeded by Jamie M. Morin
Preceded by Peter Levine	Deputy Chief Management Officer of the Department of Defense; 2017–2018	Succeeded by Lisa Hershman
New office	Chief Management Officer of the Department of Defense; 2018	Succeeded by Lisa Hershman
