= Susanna Blume =

American government official

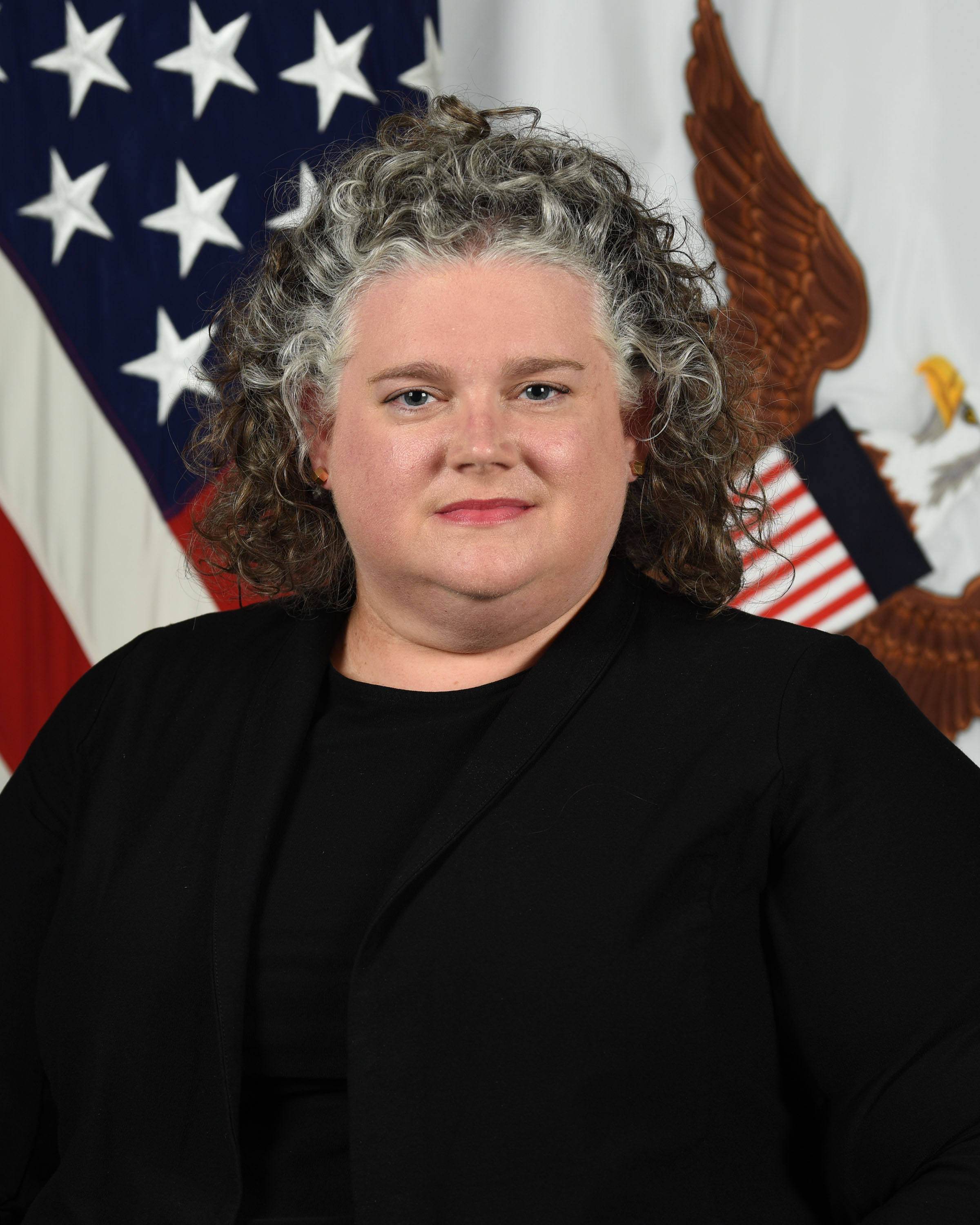

Director of Cost Assessment and Program Evaluation
- In office August 5, 2021 (Acting: January 20, 2021 – April 26, 2021) – January 20, 2025
- President: Joe Biden
- Preceded by: Robert Daigle; Joseph R. Nogueira (acting)
- Succeeded by: Michael Payne

Personal details
- Education: Johns Hopkins University (BA, MA); George Washington University (JD)

Susanna Vreeland Blume is an American government official who had served the Senate–confirmed Director of Cost Assessment and Program Evaluation (CAPE) for the Department of Defense. She began performing the duties of the director of CAPE on January 20, 2021. She was sworn in as the official director on August 5, 2021.

== Education ==
Raised in Allentown, Pennsylvania, Blume earned a Bachelor of Arts in the history of art from the Johns Hopkins University in 2005. She received a Master of Arts in international studies from the Johns Hopkins University School of Advanced International Studies in 2009 and holds a Juris Doctor from the George Washington University Law School.

== Career ==
Blume served in the Office of the Under Secretary of Defense for Policy and in the Office of the Deputy Assistant Secretary of Defense for Plans and Posture within the Obama administration. She was a senior fellow and director of the defense program at the Center for a New American Security (CNAS), where her research focused on the alignment of defense strategy, planning, and resources. Prior to joining CNAS, Blume served as deputy chief of staff for programs and plans to the deputy secretary of defense, whom she advised on programming and budget issues, global force management, operational and strategic planning, force posture, and acquisition policy. On January 20, 2021, she was sworn in as acting director of cost assessment and program evaluation.

On April 12, 2021, President Joe Biden announced Blume as his nominee to be the Director of Cost Assessment and Program Evaluation. On April 15, 2021, her nomination was sent to the Senate. Her nomination was reported out of committee on June 10, 2021. She was confirmed by the United States Senate by voice vote on July 30, 2021. She was sworn in as the Director of CAPE on August 5, 2021.

== Personal ==
Blume is the daughter of Peter Frederick Blume and Karolyn Waller Vreeland. Her father was curator of the Allentown Art Museum from 1974 to 1984 and then director of the museum until February 2002. Her mother was an Allentown attorney. The couple were married in October 1980, but divorced before 2002.

Government offices
Preceded by Robert Daigle; Joseph R. Nogueira; Acting	Director of Cost Assessment and Program Evaluation; 2021–present	Incumbent
