= Gardiner L. Tucker =

American scientist and former government official (1925–2021)

Assistant Secretary of Defense for Systems Analysis
- In office March 30, 1973 – January 30, 1970
- Preceded by: Ivan Selin
- Succeeded by: Leonard Sullivan

Personal details
- Born: Gardiner Luttrell Tucker; 1925 New York City, New York
- Died: 2021 (aged 95–96)
- Education: Columbia University (BA, PhD)
- Occupation: scientist, government official

Gardiner Luttrell Tucker (1925 – November 2021) was an American scientist and former government official. He was the former director of IBM Research and was Assistant Secretary of Defense for Systems Analysis in the Nixon administration. He also served as Assistant Secretary General of NATO.

== Biography ==
Tucker was born in 1925 in New York City. His father, Ernest E. Tucker, was an osteopathic doctor who was on the staff of LeRoy Sanitarium.

Tucker graduated from the Birch Wathen School in 1943, and from Columbia College in 1947, Phi Beta Kappa, with special distinction in mathematics and physics. In 1953, he received his PhD from Columbia University, where he studied with Isidor Isaac Rabi. He was also a member of the Sigma Xi honor society.

A year before earning his doctorate from Columbia, he was recruited by Wallace John Eckert as a research physicist at the Watson Laboratory at Columbia University to help advance IBM's research capabilities in solid state physics.

In 1954, he was promoted to physicist in charge of semiconductor research at Poughkeepsie, New York. In 1957, he became manager of research analysis and planning staff of IBM's Poughkeepsie campus.

In 1959, Tucker was made manager of IBM's San Jose, California research laboratory and in 1961 advanced to Director of Development Engineering of the IBM World Trade Corporation. In January 1963, Tucker was named IBM's Director of Research.

As Director of Research, Tucker launched a planning effort that pulled together staff from various divisions to determine what projects could be handled by existing technologies and what would require a radically different approach, streamlining the company's research and development agenda. He also started research into field effective transistors and related areas such as processing techniques, chemistry, lithography, and circuit design, laying the groundwork for IBM's mainframe memories.

In 1967, Tucker was invited to join the United States Department of Defense as Deputy Director of Defense Research and Engineering for Electronics and Information Systems.

In 1969, he was appointed Principal Deputy Director of Defense Research and Engineering before being named Assistant Secretary of Defense for Systems Analysis. Tucker assumed office in January 1970 and served in that position for three years before joining NATO as Assistant Secretary General for Defense Support, a post he held from 1973 to 1976.

From 1976 to 1985, Tucker was vice president for Science and Technology for International Paper. He also served as a director of Motorola and was the chairman of the technology committee and a member of the executive and audit committees.

Tucker died in November 2021.
