= Clifford L. Stanley =

United States Marine Corps general

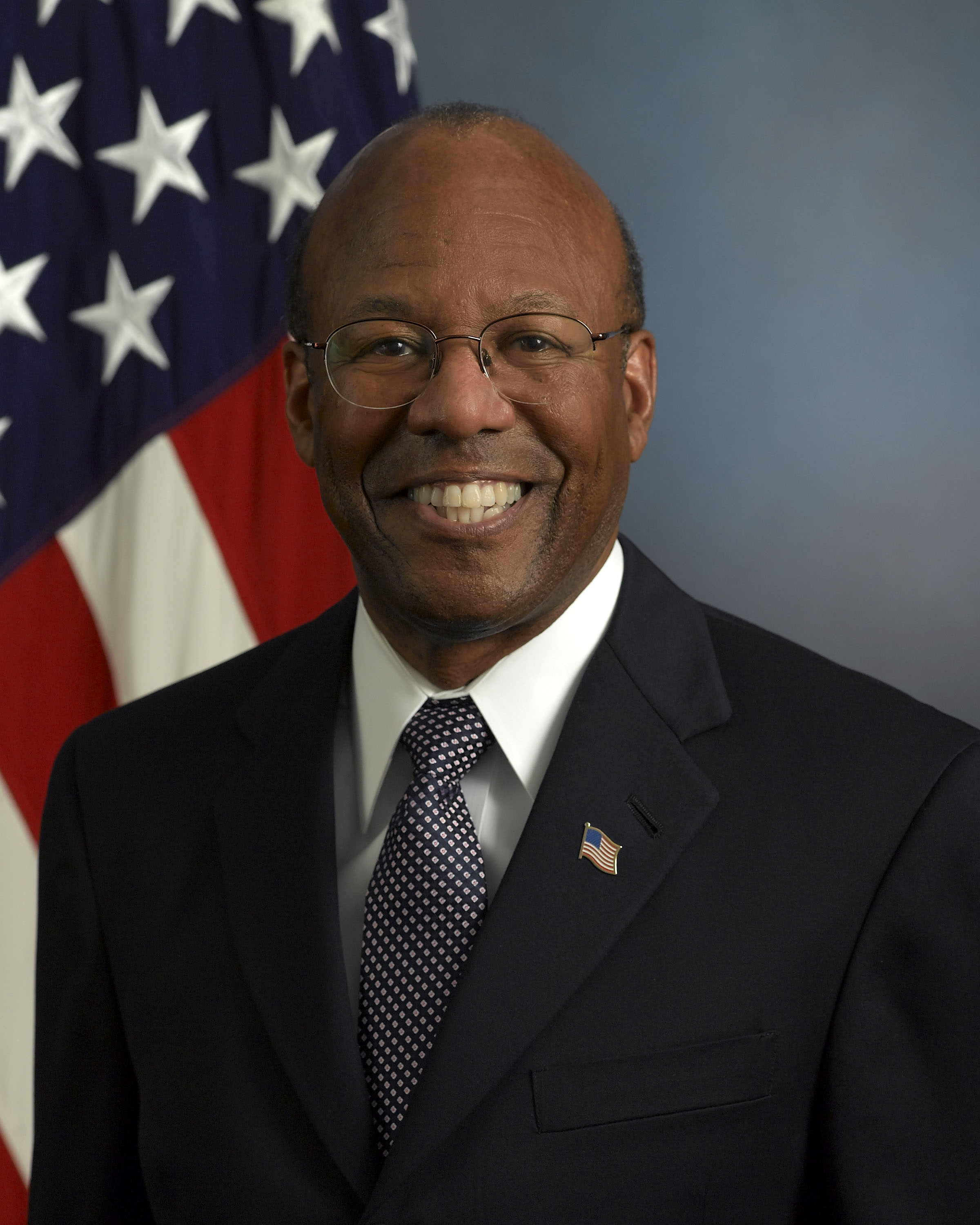
- Clifford L. Stanley, 2010.

5th Under Secretary of Defense for Personnel and Readiness
- In office February 9, 2010 – October 27, 2011
- President: Barack Obama
- Preceded by: David S. C. Chu
- Succeeded by: Erin C. Conaton

Personal details
- Born: March 31, 1947 (age 79) Washington, D.C., U.S.
- Spouse: Rosalyn Hill
- Children: 1 child, Angela
- Education: South Carolina State University (B.S.); Johns Hopkins University (M.S.); University of Pennsylvania (EdD)
- Occupation: Federal agency administrator; retired major general of the United States Marine Corps

Clifford Lee Stanley (born March 31, 1947) was the United States Under Secretary of Defense for Personnel and Readiness, having resigned that office in 2011.

== Biography ==
Clifford L. Stanley was educated at South Carolina State University, graduating with a bachelor's degree in psychology in 1969.

Upon graduation, Stanley was commissioned as a second lieutenant in the United States Marine Corps. After completing The Basic School in Quantico, Virginia, he served as a fiscal and supply officer. After redesignation as an infantry officer, he was a platoon commander; company commander in 3rd Battalion, 8th Marines; commanding officer of Headquarters Company, 4th Marines; the executive officer of 1st Battalion, 6th Marines; and then commanding officer of the 1st Marines. Stanley was the first African American to command a United States Marine regiment.

In 1977, Stanley was awarded an M.S. in counseling by Johns Hopkins University. He later attended the Amphibious Warfare School (1978) (see Marine Corps University), the Naval War College (1983), the U.S. Marine Corps Command and Staff College (1984) (see Marine Corps University), and the National War College (1988).

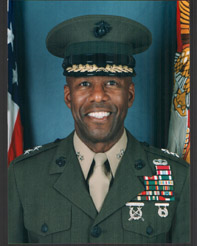
Stanley in uniform as major general of the United States Marine Corps.

In the Marine Corps, Stanley served as a psychology and leadership instructor at the United States Naval Academy; executive officer of the Marine Corps Institute and parade commander at Marine Barracks, Washington, D.C.; special assistant and Marine Corps aide for the Assistant Secretary of the Navy; and as a desk officer in the Office of the Assistant Secretary of State for East Asian and Pacific Affairs at the Pentagon. Other assignments include: depot inspector and commander, Marine Corps Recruit Depot Parris Island; as one of the White House Fellows, he served as special assistant to the director of the Federal Bureau of Investigation; fleet marine officer of the United States Second Fleet, stationed on board the USS Mount Whitney (LCC-20); assistant deputy chief of staff for manpower and reserve affairs (Manpower Plans & Policy); director of public affairs at Headquarters Marine Corps, Washington, D.C.; commanding general of Marine Corps Air Ground Combat Center Twentynine Palms; and finally as commanding general of Marine Corps Base Quantico. Stanley retired in 2002, having achieved the rank of major general. He holds the Legion of Merit, Defense Meritorious Service Medal, Meritorious Service Medal with gold star, Navy Commendation Medal, and Navy Achievement Medal.

Stanley attended the University of Pennsylvania, earning an Ed.D. He has also received honorary LL.D.s from Spalding University and his alma mater, South Carolina State University.

In 2002, he became Executive Vice President at the University of Pennsylvania, serving as the university's chief operating officer. He resigned a year later. In 2004, Stanley became president of Scholarship America, where he served until 2009.

He has also served as a member of the board of directors of the White House Fellowship Association and of the McCormick Educational Foundation. He also served on the board of trustees for Spalding University, as the district chair for the Northern District of the Boy Scouts of America, on the board of governors for the Civil War and Underground Railroad Museum of Philadelphia (now the Civil War Museum of Philadelphia), and as the president of the Philadelphia Alumni Chapter of the South Carolina State University Alumni Association.

In October 2009, President Barack Obama nominated Stanley as Undersecretary of Defense for Personnel and Readiness. After he was confirmed by the U.S. Senate, Stanley was sworn into office on February 16, 2010. In November 2009, a private non-profit organization, Americans for Limited Government, published a "nominee alert" that cited various reasons why it believed Stanley should not have been selected for this position.

Press reports in late 2011 indicated the Department of Defense's inspector general was investigating Stanley's office due to "highly detailed allegations of gross mismanagement and abuse of power." His resignation was announced 27 October 2011.

== Personal ==
In the 2024 United States presidential election, Stanley endorsed Kamala Harris.
