= Hirschman =

Hirschman or Hirschmann is a German surname, where 'Hirsch' means Deer. It may refer to:

== People ==
=== Hirschman ===
- Albert O. Hirschman (1915–2012), German-American economist
- Herbert Hirschman (1914–1985), American television producer and director
- Isidore Isaac Hirschman, Jr. (1922–1990), American mathematician
- Jack Hirschman (1933–2021), American poet and social activist

=== Hirschmann ===
- Carl Anton Wilhelm Hirschmann (1877–1951), Dutch banker and General Secretary of FIFA
- Maria Anne Hirschmann, American teacher
- Ursula Hirschmann (1913–1991), German anti-fascist activist and an advocate of European federalism

== See also ==
- Herfindahl–Hirschman Index, a measure of the size of firms in relation to the industry and an indicator of the amount of competition among them
- Herschmann, surname
- Hirschman cycle, attempts to describe cycles in American political power
- Hirschman uncertainty, in quantum mechanics, information theory, and Fourier analysis, the entropic uncertainty or Hirschman uncertainty is the sum of the temporal and spectral Shannon entropies
- Hirshman, surname
