= David S. C. Chu =

American economist

- 朱思九
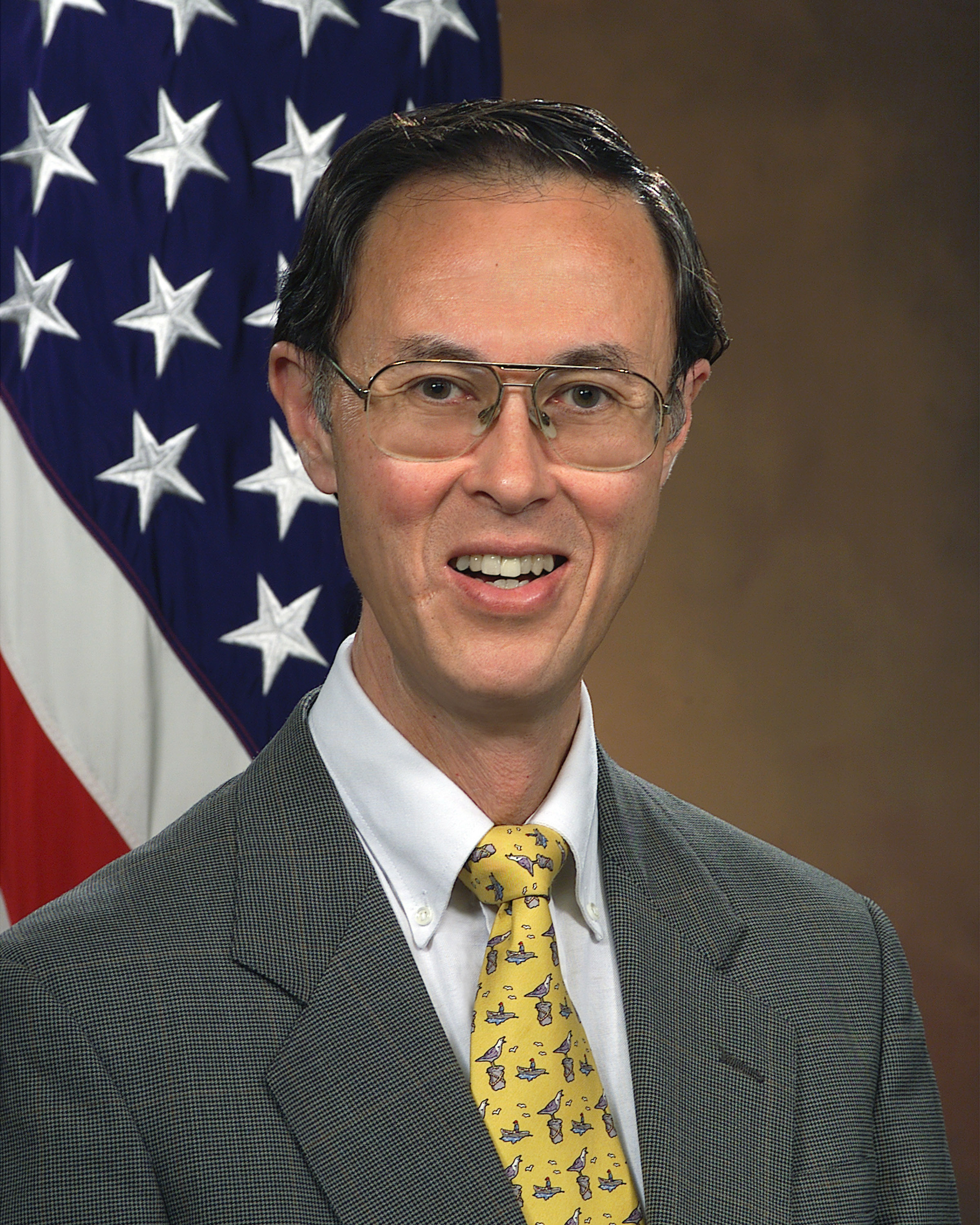

United States Under Secretary of Defense for Personnel and Readiness
- In office June 1, 2001 – January 20, 2009
- President: George W. Bush
- Preceded by: Bernard D. Rostker
- Succeeded by: Clifford L. Stanley

United States Assistant Secretary of Defense for Program Analysis & Evaluation
- In office May 19, 1981 – January 20, 1993
- President: Ronald Reagan; George H. W. Bush
- Preceded by: Russell Murray II
- Succeeded by: William J. Lynn III

Personal details
- Born: May 28, 1944 (age 82) New York, New York, U.S.
- Spouse: Laura L. Tosi
- Children: 2
- Education: Yale University (BA, PhD)

Military service
- Allegiance: United States
- Branch/service: United States Army
- Years of service: 1968–1970
- Rank: Captain
- Battles/wars: Vietnam War

David S. C. Chu (朱思九; pinyin: Zhū Sījiǔ; born May 28, 1944) is a retired American civil servant and consultant.

He was born in New York, New York on May 28, 1944. He served as the president and CEO of the non-profit Institute for Defense Analyses from 2009 to 2019. From 2001 to 2008, he served as Under Secretary of Defense for Personnel and Readiness in the George W. Bush administration.

Chu received a Bachelor of Arts Degree, magna cum laude, in Economics and Mathematics from Yale University in 1964 and a PhD in Economics, also from Yale, in 1972 following a break due to military service. In 1968 he was commissioned in the United States Army and became an instructor at the U.S. Army Logistics Management Center, Fort Lee, Virginia. He later served a tour of duty in the Vietnam War, working in the Office of the Comptroller, Headquarters, 1st Logistical Command. He obtained the rank of captain and completed his service with the Army in 1970.

From 1978 to 1981, Chu served as the assistant director for National Security and International Affairs, Congressional Budget Office, providing advice to the Congress on the full range of national security and international economic issues. He was Director, Program Analysis and Evaluation and then Assistant Secretary of Defense (Program Analysis and Evaluation) from May 1981 to January 1993. In that capacity, he advised the Secretary of Defense on the future size and structure of the armed forces, their equipment, and their preparation for crisis or conflict.

From 1993 to 2001, Chu served in several senior executive positions with the RAND Corporation, including Vice President and Director of the Arroyo Center, the Army's federally funded research and development center for studies and analysis, and Director of RAND's Washington Office.

Chu was appointed on June 1, 2001, as Under Secretary of Defense for Personnel and Readiness. In that position, he was responsible as the senior policy advisor on recruitment, career development, pay and benefits, and overseeing the state of military readiness. He left that position in 2008, and joined the Institute for Defense Analyses as president and CEO.

He is a fellow of the National Academy of Public Administration and a recipient of its National Public Senior Award. He holds the Department of Defense Medal for Distinguished Public Service with silver palm.

Chu's father came from China to study at the University of Illinois, during World War II he worked for the China News Service and afterwards went to work for the United Nations. His mother's family came to America before the Revolutionary War. Chu's brother was chairman of the music department at Hamline University and his sister is a human resources executive at Kent State University.
