= Lisa Hershman =

American businesswoman (born 1963)

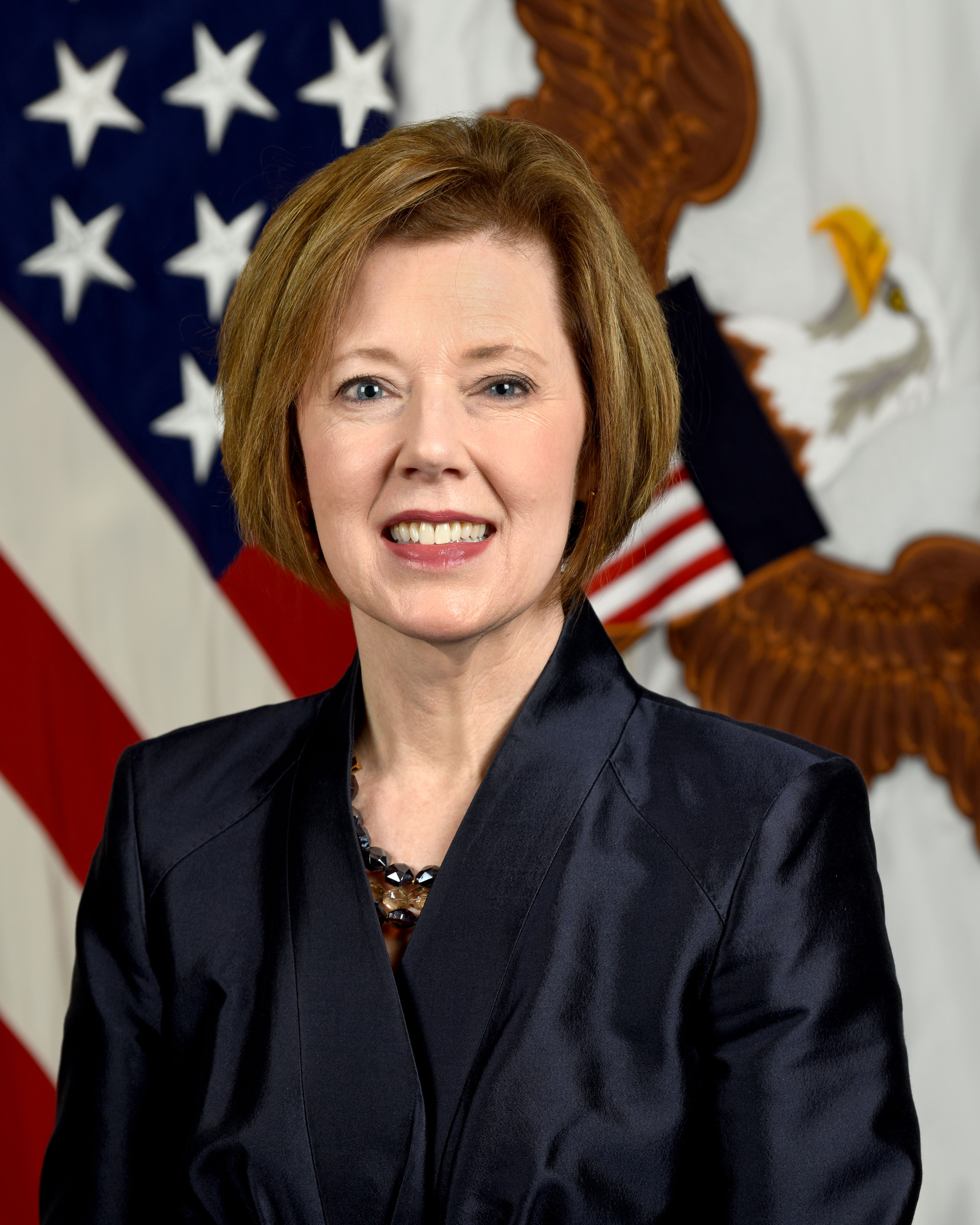

Indiana Secretary of Budget and Management
- Incumbent
- Assumed office January 13, 2025
- Governor: Mike Braun

Chief Management Officer of the Department of Defense
- In office December 19, 2019 – January 1, 2021; Acting: December 1, 2018 – December 19, 2019
- President: Donald Trump
- Preceded by: John H. Gibson
- Succeeded by: Office abolished

Deputy Chief Management Officer of the Department of Defense
- In office April 13, 2018 – December 19, 2019
- President: Donald Trump
- Preceded by: John H. Gibson
- Succeeded by: Vacant

Personal details
- Born: November 13, 1963 (age 62)
- Spouse: Brandt Hershman
- Education: Clarkson University (BS)

Lisa W. Hershman (born November 13, 1963) is an American government official who served as the chief management officer of the Department of Defense from December 19, 2019, to January 1, 2021. She currently serves as the Secretary of Management and Budget in the administration of Indiana Governor Mike Braun and was appointed December 2024. She previously served as the Deputy Chief Management Officer of the Department of Defense from April 13, 2018, to December 19, 2019. On December 1, 2018, she became the acting chief management officer of the Department of Defense following the resignation of John H. Gibson. On July 22, 2019, Hershman was nominated for the position of Chief Management Officer of the Department of Defense.[3] On December 19, 2019, this nomination was approved by a voice vote of the U.S. Senate, making her the highest-ranking woman ever confirmed by the U.S. Senate to a Pentagon position at the time.

Upon her departure from the Pentagon in January 2021, Hershman was awarded the Distinguished Public Service Medal, the highest civilian honor awarded by the Department of Defense. Hershman was further honored by having a room at the Pentagon named in her honor – the first room in the history of the Pentagon to be officially named after a woman.

== Education ==
Hershman earned a Bachelor of Science degree in engineering and industrial distribution from Clarkson University. She has also studied innovation at the Massachusetts Institute of Technology and International Institute for Management Development in Switzerland. She later received an executive certificate in finance from Cornell University.

== Career ==
As the chief management officer of the Department of Defense, Hershman worked with the Secretary of Defense on policy development, planning, resource management, and program evaluation responsibilities related to business transformation and reform throughout the department. Her role had direct oversight of a more than $160 billion budget and 120,000 employees of the 28 Defense Agencies and Field Activities known informally as the Fourth Estate, which includes the Defense Logistics Agency, the Defense Finance Accounting Service, the Defense Health Agency and the Defense Intelligence Agency, among others. Tasked by the Secretary of Defense to improve its fiscal planning process, Hershman successfully completed the first unified budget build of these agencies in the history of the department. Leading her Pentagon team, Hershman achieved more than $37 billion in reform savings, which was independently validated by the Government Accountability Office.

In response to the COVID-19 pandemic, Hershman served as the senior official in charge of COVID response for the Department of Defense office space in the National Capitol Region, which includes the Pentagon. She served in an oversight role in intelligence activities, with the designated assistant to the secretary of defense for intelligence oversight reporting to her.

In addition to these responsibilities, Hershman also served as the Department of Defense leader for implementation of the Women, Peace and Security (WPS) Act of 2017 - the first legislation of its kind globally.

In December 2024, Indiana Governor-elect Mike Braun announced Hershman as his pick for Secretary of Budget and Management for the state. Governor Braun cited her "track record of driving efficiency and innovation in both government and business" and "experience transforming large organizations and delivering taxpayer savings."As Secretary of Budget and Management, Hershman will develop the budget to reflect the administration's priorities and manage finances, technology, and shared services for state agencies.

=== Business career ===
Hershman was the founder and CEO of the DeNovo Group, a specialized global consulting, training, and research firm focused on leadership, innovation, and business turnarounds. Hershman co-authored her book with the Michael Hammer, a MIT professor who founded the field of business process reengineering. After Hammer's untimely death, Hershman was asked to assume the role as CEO of Hammer and Company, in which she led a team consulting and training fortune 100 companies such as BMW, Pfizer, PepsiCo, State Farm Insurance, and USAA, as well as governmental units including the U.S. Air Force and Sandia National Labs.

Earlier in her career, Hershman was the Corporate Senior Vice President of Operational Excellence at Avnet, Inc., where she successfully managed initiatives in 72 countries. The cost reductions and increased efficiency she achieved led her to be honored with the Avnet Corporate Chairman's Award. Prior to that, Hershman led Process and Resource Development efforts at Brightpoint Inc., now a part of Ingram Micro, a global provider of integrated logistics services.

On April 29, 2021, Hershman was named to the board of directors at EchoStar.

=== Other work ===
Hershman has served as a board member and qualified as an audit committee financial expert under SEC guidelines for First Source Bank, a $7 billion institution.

In the nonprofit sector, she has served as Vice Chair of the Indiana Commission for Higher Education, overseeing the state's public universities, as National Secretary of the Business and Professional Women's Foundation (BPW USA), as a Commissioner of the Indiana Commission for Women, on the board of the Consortium for Advanced Management (CAM-I), and the board of the Richard G. Lugar Excellence in Public Service Series.

She has also served as a board member for the Center for Interactive Learning and Collaboration (CILC), as a member of Ball State University's Miller School of Business Entrepreneurial Education Advisory Council, and on the Leadership Council of the Indiana Chapter of the National Federation of Independent Business.

Political offices
Preceded by John H. Gibson	Deputy Chief Management Officer of the Department of Defense; 2018–2019	Succeeded by Vacant
Preceded by John H. Gibson	Chief Management Officer of the Department of Defense; 2018–2021	Succeeded by Office abolished
