= Weapon Systems Acquisition Reform Act of 2009 =

- Long title: An Act to improve the organization and procedures of the Department of Defense for the acquisition of major weapon systems, and for other purposes.
- Enacted by: the 111th United States Congress
- Effective: May 22, 2009

Legislative history
- Introduced in the Senate as S. 454 by Carl Levin (D–MI) on February 23, 2009; Committee consideration by Armed Services; Passed the Senate on May 7, 2009 (93-0); Passed the House on May 13, 2009 (428-0); Reported by the joint conference committee on May 19th, 2009; agreed to by the Senate on May 20th, 2005 (95-0) and by the House on May 21st, 2009 (411-0); Signed into law by President Barack Obama on May 22, 2009

The Weapon Systems Acquisition Reform Act, formally known as the Weapons Acquisition System Reform Through Enhancing Technical Knowledge and Oversight Act of 2009, was an Act of Congress created to reform the way the Pentagon contracts and purchases major weapons systems. It was signed into law on May 22, 2009, by President Barack Obama.

The Congressional Budget Office predicted that the reforms would cost US$55 million and should be in place by the end of 2010. The reforms are expected to save millions, perhaps even billions of dollars during the 2010s. According to the Government Accountability Office, nearly 70% of the Pentagon's 96 biggest weapons programs were over budget in 2008. Another government report detailed $295 billion in waste and cost overruns in defense contracts. The legislation created a Pentagon office, the Office of Cost Assessment and Program Evaluation (CAPE), to analyze the cost of new programs. CAPE reports directly to the Secretary of Defense and supersedes the Office of Program Analysis and Evaluation (PA&E). It also puts more emphasis on testing new weapons before they enter production to ensure sufficient development, giving commanders more say in weapons requirements.

== Legislative history ==
The Act was introduced February 23, 2009. The bill passed both the House of Representatives and the Senate unanimously, 411-0 and 93-0, respectively. Upon signing the Act, President Obama cited the need to end the "waste and inefficiency" it addressed.

== Key provisions ==
Key provisions in the Weapon Systems Acquisition Reform Act included:

- Appointment of a Director of Cost Assessment and Program Evaluation (CAPE), who will communicate directly with the Secretary of Defense and Deputy Secretary of Defense, and issue policies and establish guidance on cost estimating and developing confidence levels for such cost estimates;
- Appointment of a Director of Developmental Test and Evaluation, who will be the principal advisor to the Secretary of Defense on developmental test and evaluation, and will develop DoD-wide policies and guidance for conducting developmental testing and evaluation. This official will review, approve, and monitor such testing for each Major Defense Acquisition Program (MDAP);
- Appointment of a Director of Systems Engineering, who will be the principal advisor to the Secretary of Defense on systems engineering, and will develop DoD-wide policies and guidance for the application of systems engineering. This official will review, approve, and monitor systems engineering practices for each MDAP;
- Requirement that the Director of Defense Research and Engineering periodically assess the technological maturity of MDAPs and annually report his/her findings to Congress;
- Requirement that DoD employ prototyping of MDAPs whenever practical;
- Requirement that combatant commanders have more influence in the requirements generation process;
- Changes to the Nunn–McCurdy Amendment, such as rescinding the most recent "Milestone" approval for any program that has experienced "critical cost growth;" and
- Requirement that DoD revise guidelines and tighten regulations pertaining to conflict of interest of contractors working on MDAPs.
