= Brandt Hershman =

American politician

Majority Leader of the Indiana Senate
- In office April 30, 2012 – January 2, 2018
- Preceded by: Connie Lawson
- Succeeded by: Rodric Bray

Member of the Indiana Senate from the 7th district
- In office November 8, 2000 – January 2, 2018
- Preceded by: Katie Wolf
- Succeeded by: Brian Buchanan

Personal details
- Party: Republican
- Spouse: Lisa Hershman
- Education: Purdue University (BA)

Brandt Hershman is an American politician and a former Republican state senator for Indiana. He served from 2000 to 2018. He is married to Lisa Hershman.

== Early life and education ==
Hershman grew up on a farm in Jasper County, Indiana. He earned a Bachelor of Arts degree in political science from Purdue University.

== Career ==
After graduating from college, Hershman took a job working in the White House. In 1991, a family friend, Steve Buyer, asked for help in his run for Congress. After winning in 1992, he became the district operations director for Buyer.

=== Indiana Senate ===
Hershman was first elected to the Indiana Senate in 2000 and was re-elected in 2004, 2008, 2012 and 2016. He served as the Majority Floor Leader and represented Senate District 7, which includes parts of White, Tippecanoe, Jasper, Clinton, Carroll and Boone counties.

In 2007, Hershman authored the bill to ban same-sex marriage in Indiana.

Hershman was named Senate majority floor leader in 2012 after Connie Lawson resigned to become secretary of state. He also served as chairman of the Senate Tax and Fiscal Policy Committee. He co-authored the Major Moves transportation bill and has won numerous awards for his work with telecommunication deregulation and small business in Indiana.

On February 17, 2010, Hershman filed paperwork to run for Indiana's 4th congressional district. He finished second after Todd Rokita in the 2010 primary election. On December 22, 2017, Hershman announced that he would resign from the Senate on January 2, 2018. He was succeeded by Rodric Bray as Senate majority floor leader. In 2018, it was reported that Hershman was being considered for a position in the Federal Communications Commission. He later accepted a job with Barnes & Thornburg in Washington, D.C.

Indiana Senate
| Preceded by Connie Lawson | Majority Leader of the Indiana Senate; 2018 | Succeeded by Rodric Bray |
