= Director of Cost Assessment and Program Evaluation =

US Department of Defense official

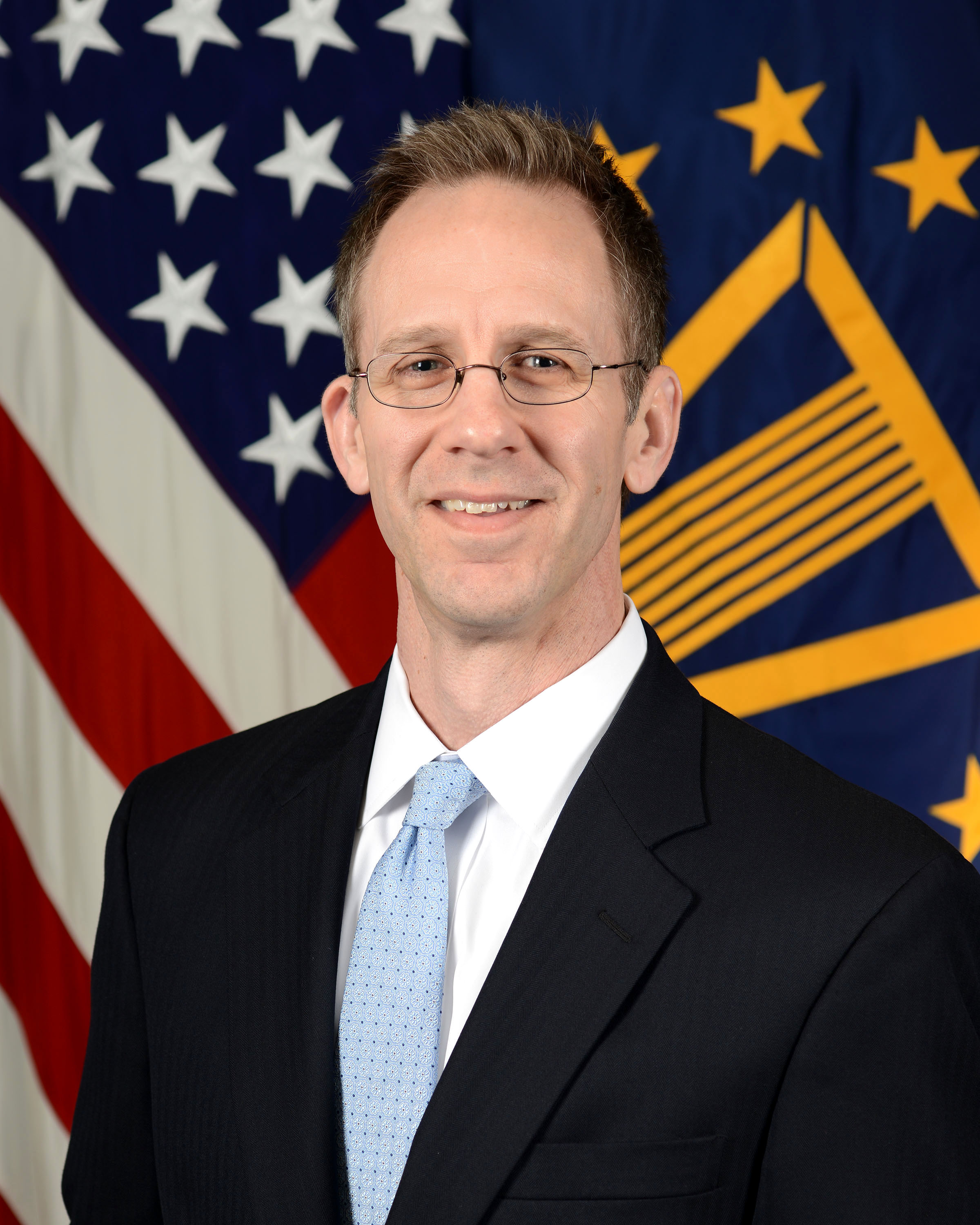
- Incumbent; Michael Payne since January 14, 2026
- Reports to: Secretary of Defense
- Seat: Washington D.C.
- Nominator: President of the United States
- First holder: Alain C. Enthoven
- Website: Official website

The Director of Cost Assessment and Program Evaluation (CAPE) is a principal staff assistant and advisor to the Secretary and Deputy Secretary of Defense in the Office of the Secretary of Defense.

The postholder, as chartered under United States Department of Defense Directive 5141.1 in 1996 (subsequently superseded and canceled with the publication of United States Department of Defense Directive 5105.84, Director of Cost Assessment and Program Evaluation (DCAPE)), provides independent analytic advice to the Secretary of Defense on all aspects of the Department of Defense (DoD) program, including alternative weapons and force structures, the development and evaluation of defense program alternatives, and the cost-effectiveness of defense systems. The office also conducts analyses and offers advice in a number of related areas, such as military medical care, school systems for military dependents, information technology, and defense economics. As an advisory office, the office has no decision authority or line responsibilities.

The Director of CAPE reports directly to the Secretary of Defense and the Deputy Secretary of Defense. A political appointee, the Director of CAPE is an Executive Service Level IV official who is nominated by the president of the United States and confirmed by the United States Senate. He or she coordinates and exchanges information with other Office of the Secretary of Defense officials, the Heads of the DoD Components, and Federal officials having collateral or related functions.

CAPE has a staff of about 155 people, including government civilians and military officers, and hires contractors as well. The military officers serve in two- to three-year assignments with the organization. CAPE's civilian staff is drawn from a variety of academic disciplines, including physics, economics, engineering, mathematics, biology, and computer science. The CAPE staff is recognized as among the most capable in the Pentagon.

== History ==
CAPE traces its history to the 1960s, when Defense Secretary Robert S. McNamara created the office of Assistant Secretary of Defense (Systems Analysis).

This office was most previously known as the Office of Program Analysis & Evaluation (PA&E), made defunct by the Weapon Systems Acquisition Reform Act of 2009.

== Officeholders ==
The table below includes both the various titles of this post over time, as well as all the holders of those offices.

Directors of Cost Assessment and Program Evaluation
| Name | Tenure | SecDef(s) served under | President(s) served under |
|---|---|---|---|
Assistant Secretary of Defense (Systems Analysis)
| Alain C. Enthoven | September 10, 1965 – January 20, 1969 | Robert S. McNamara Clark M. Clifford | Lyndon Johnson |
| Ivan Selin (Acting) | January 31, 1969 – January 30, 1970 | Melvin R. Laird | Richard Nixon |
| Gardiner L. Tucker | January 30, 1970 – March 30, 1973 | Melvin R. Laird Elliot L. Richardson | Richard Nixon |
Director (Defense Program Analysis and Evaluation)
| Leonard Sullivan | May 21, 1973 – February 11, 1974 | Elliot L. Richardson James R. Schlesinger | Richard Nixon |
Assistant Secretary of Defense (Program Analysis and Evaluation)
| Leonard Sullivan | February 11, 1974 – March 13, 1976 | James R. Schlesinger Donald H. Rumsfeld | Richard Nixon Gerald Ford |
Director for Planning and Evaluation
| Edward C. Aldridge, Jr. | May 18, 1976 – March 11, 1977 | Donald H. Rumsfeld Harold Brown | Gerald Ford Jimmy Carter |
Assistant Secretary of Defense (Program Analysis and Evaluation)
| Russell Murray II | April 28, 1977 – January 20, 1981 | Harold Brown | Jimmy Carter |
Director of Program Analysis and Evaluation
| David S. C. Chu | May 19, 1981 – July 13, 1988 | Caspar W. Weinberger Frank C. Carlucci III | Ronald Reagan |
Assistant Secretary of Defense (Program Analysis and Evaluation)
| David S. C. Chu | July 13, 1988 – January 20, 1993 | Frank C. Carlucci III William H. Taft IV (Acting) Richard B. Cheney | Ronald Reagan George H. W. Bush |
Director of Program Analysis and Evaluation
| William J. Lynn | June 25, 1993 – November 19, 1997 | Leslie Aspin, Jr. William J. Perry William S. Cohen | Bill Clinton |
| Robert R. Soule | July 1, 1998 – April 27, 2001 | William S. Cohen Donald H. Rumsfeld | Bill Clinton George W. Bush |
| Barry D. Watts | May 1, 2001 – July 1, 2002 | Donald H. Rumsfeld | George W. Bush |
| Stephen A. Cambone | July 1, 2002 – March 7, 2003 | Donald H. Rumsfeld | George W. Bush |
| Kenneth J. Krieg | July 23, 2003 – June 6, 2005 | Donald H. Rumsfeld | George W. Bush |
| Bradley M. Berkson | June 6, 2005 – April 3, 2009 | Donald H. Rumsfeld Robert M. Gates | George W. Bush Barack Obama |
Director of Cost Assessment & Program Evaluation
| Christine H. Fox | October 28, 2009 – June 28, 2013 | Robert M. Gates Leon Panetta Chuck Hagel | Barack Obama |
| Jamie M. Morin | June 30, 2014 – January 20, 2017 | Chuck Hagel Ashton Carter | Barack Obama |
| Scott Comes (Acting) | January 20, 2017 - August 7, 2017 | James Mattis | Donald Trump |
| Robert Daigle | August 7, 2017 – May 18, 2019 | James Mattis | Donald Trump |
| E. Y. (Yisroel) Brumer (Acting) | May 18, 2019 – August 16, 2019 | Mark Esper | Donald Trump |
| John Whitley (Acting) | August 16, 2019 – May 4, 2020 | Mark Esper | Donald Trump |
| Joseph Nogueira (Acting) | May 4, 2020 – January 20, 2021 | Mark Esper Lloyd Austin | Donald Trump Joe Biden |
| Susanna Blume (Performing the Duties of) | January 20, 2021 – April 26, 2021 | Lloyd Austin | Joe Biden |
| Susanna Blume | August 5, 2021 – January 20, 2025 | Lloyd Austin | Joe Biden |
| Michael Payne | January 20, 2025 – January 14, 2026 (Acting) | Pete Hegseth | Donald Trump |
| Michael Payne | January 14, 2026 – Present | Pete Hegseth | Donald Trump |
