= Christine Fox =

American military official and politician

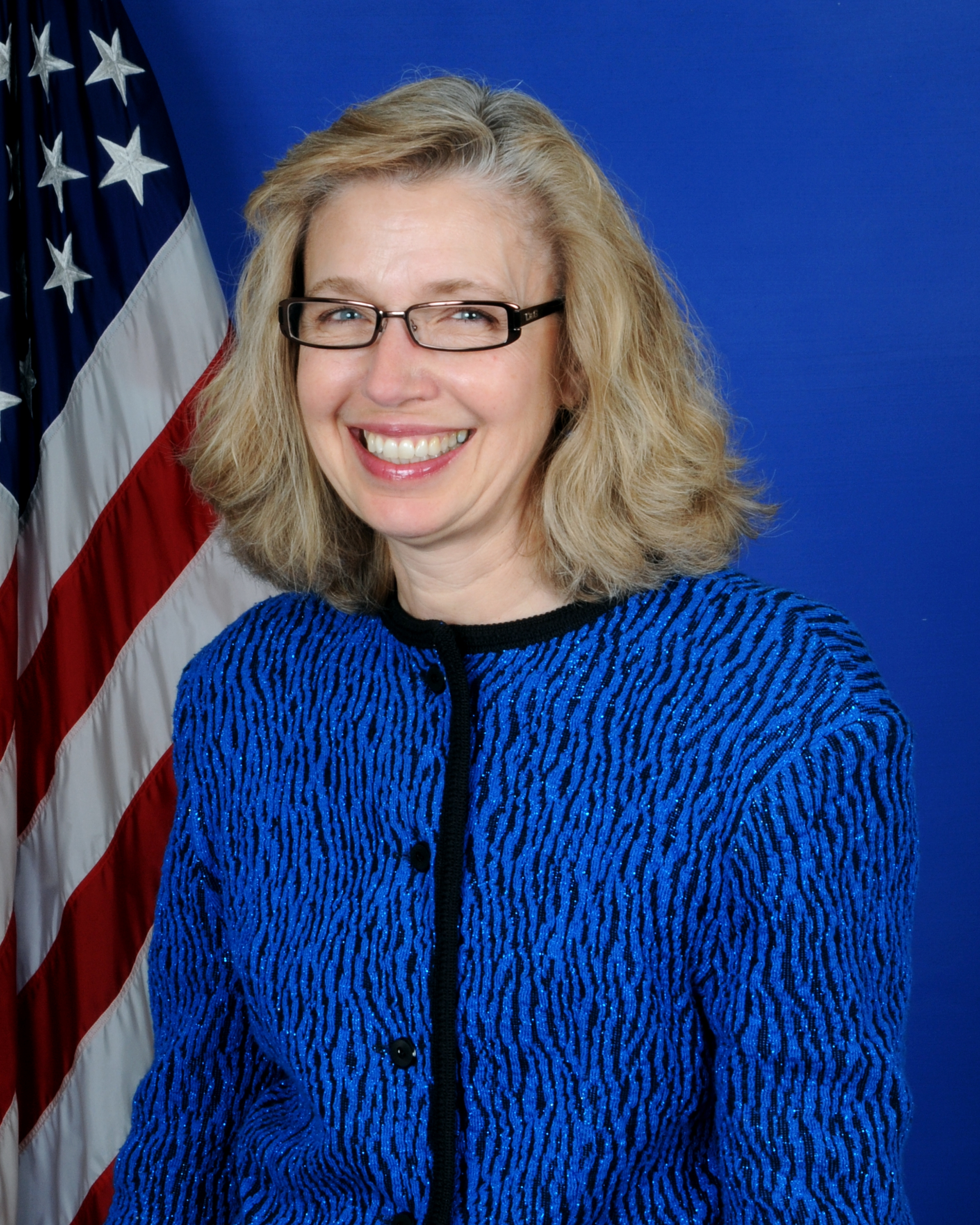

Acting Deputy Secretary of Defense
- In office December 4, 2013 – May 1, 2014
- President: Barack Obama
- Preceded by: Ash Carter
- Succeeded by: Robert Work

Personal details
- Born: May 26, 1955 (age 71) Bethesda, Maryland
- Education: George Mason University

Christine Fox (born May 26, 1955) is an American military civilian official and politician, who served as the Acting Deputy Secretary of Defense from December 3, 2013 until Robert Work's confirmation on May 1, 2014. With her appointment, Fox became the highest-ranking woman to serve in the United States Department of Defense.

== Career ==
Fox graduated from George Mason University. She was a civilian employee at Naval Air Station Miramar and worked for CNA for nearly three decades as a research analyst, manager, and president of the Center for Naval Analyses.

From 2009 until 2013, she was the director of cost assessment and program evaluation in the Office of the Secretary of Defense—one of the most senior civilian positions in the Department of Defense. In her role as acting deputy secretary, she became the highest-ranking woman ever to work in the Pentagon. She officially retired from the Pentagon in May 2014.

From 2014 through 2022, Fox worked as the assistant director for policy and analysis at the Johns Hopkins University Applied Physics Laboratory before transitioning to serve as one of the Lab's Senior Fellows.

She served on the boards of the United States Naval Academy, Woods Hole Oceanographic Institution, and the Council on Foreign Relations.

== Honors ==
Fox is a three-time recipient of the Department of Defense Distinguished Civilian Service Award and received the Department of Defense Medal for Distinguished Public Service.

== In popular culture ==
Fox gained notability during her work at Naval Air Station Miramar, and became the inspiration for the Top Gun character Charlotte "Charlie" Blackwood, played by Kelly McGillis in the film.

In April 2018, Fox was interviewed in the documentary Do You Trust This Computer?
