= Assistant to the Secretary of Defense for Privacy, Civil Liberties & Transparency =

Assistant to the Secretary of Defense for Privacy, Civil Liberties & Transparency

The Assistant to the Secretary of Defense for Privacy, Civil Liberties & Transparency, ATSD(PCLT), was an office founded September 1st, 2021 and disestablished in October of 2025. The experiment brought the ATSD(IO), which was founded in 1982, under a new ATSD led by the Defense Privacy Officer. ATSD (IO) was previously responsible to the U.S. secretary of defense for the independent oversight of all intelligence, counterintelligence, and intelligence-related activities in the Department of Defense. Although the ATSD(PCLT) charter was never published, there are functional charters published for DoW intelligence oversight and privacy and civil liberties

A February 2024 report by the Government Accountability Office (GAO) recommended DoD improve the monitoring of intelligence oversight inspections, mitigate risks of not conducting inspections, and improve the DoD SIOO’s topic assessments.

In April 2025, an Intelligence Specialist within ATSD (PCLT) published an article critical of PCLT's lack of focus on the mission. In May 2025 both the ATSD (PCLT) and the Principal Deputy ATSD (PCLT) / DoD SIOO both suddenly announced their retirements.

As of August 2026 Michael Kremlacek held the position of Director, Oversight & Compliance (DO&C), DoW Privacy & Civil Liberties Officer, and Department of War (DoW) Senior Intelligence Oversight Official (SIOO).

== Background ==
The DoW Intelligence Oversight (IO) program came about as a result of DoW’s intelligence and counterintelligence capabilities being inappropriately used against U.S. persons. Following publication in 1981 of Executive Order 12333, the Secretary of Defense directed establishment of an Inspector General for Intelligence, which was redesignated the Assistant to the Secretary of Defense (Intelligence Oversight) (ATSD(IO)) in November 1982, following the establishment of the DoD Inspector General.

== Reorganization ==
In 2014, DoD realigned its intelligence oversight, privacy, and civil liberties functions as the Oversight and Compliance office under the Chief Management Officer and in 2021 the office was redesignated the ATSD for Privacy, Civil Liberties, and Transparency (ATSD(PCLT)). In 2025 the office was realigned as a directorate under DoW’s Office of the Director of Administration & Management.

== Notable Former Leaders ==
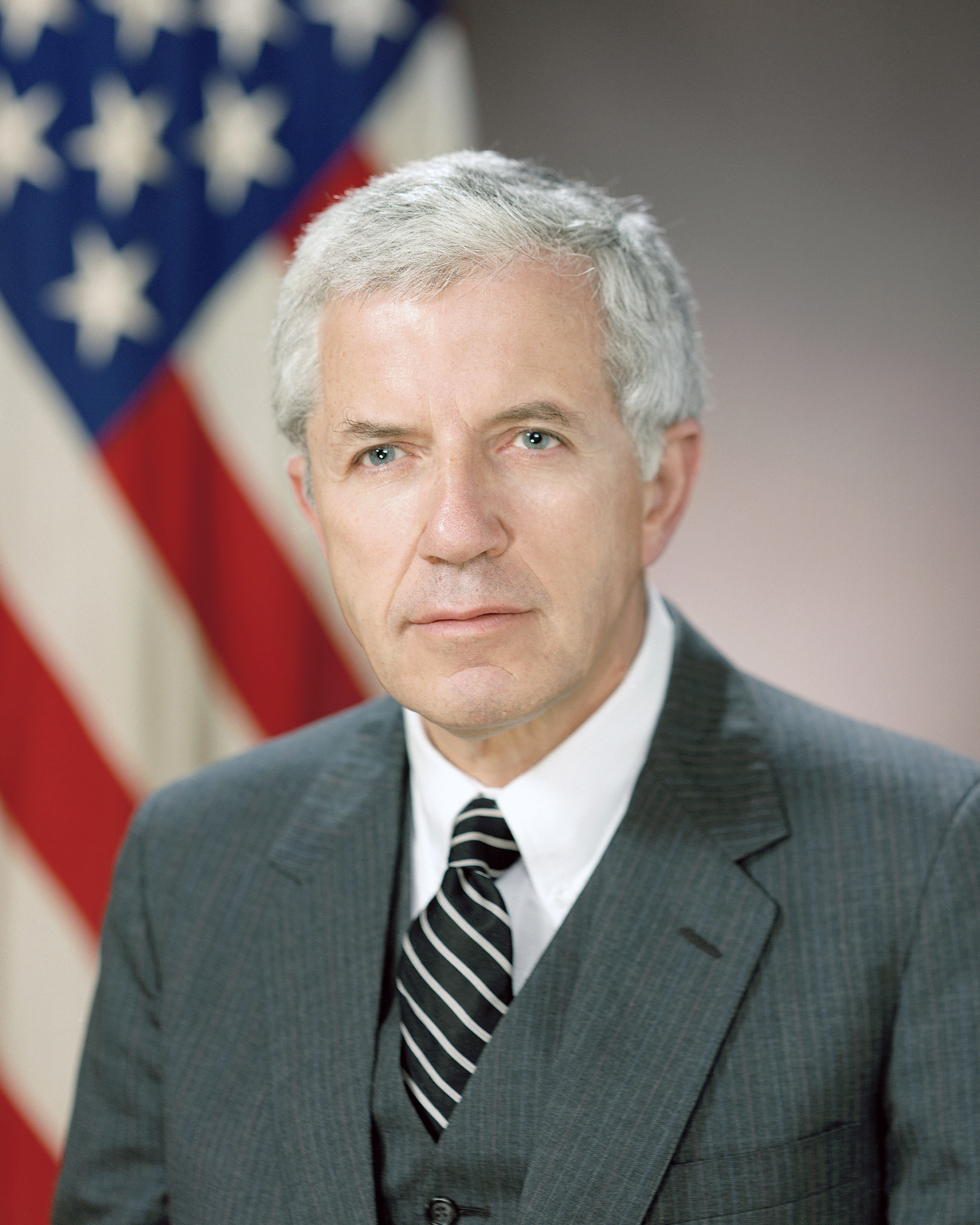
Portrait of Werner E. Michel, Assistant to the Secretary of Defense for Intelligence Oversight

Werner E. Michel, 1980 – 1993, was a veteran of WWII, Korea, and Vietnam, retiring as a Colonel in the Army Counterintelligence Corps.

Walter Jajko, 1994 – 1998, was a Brigadier General in U.S. Air Force intelligence.

Michael H. Decker, 2009 – 2014, was a Marine Corps infantry and intelligence officer and previously served as the Director of Marine Corps Intelligence.
