= Lloyd Austin =

American U.S. Army general (born 1953)

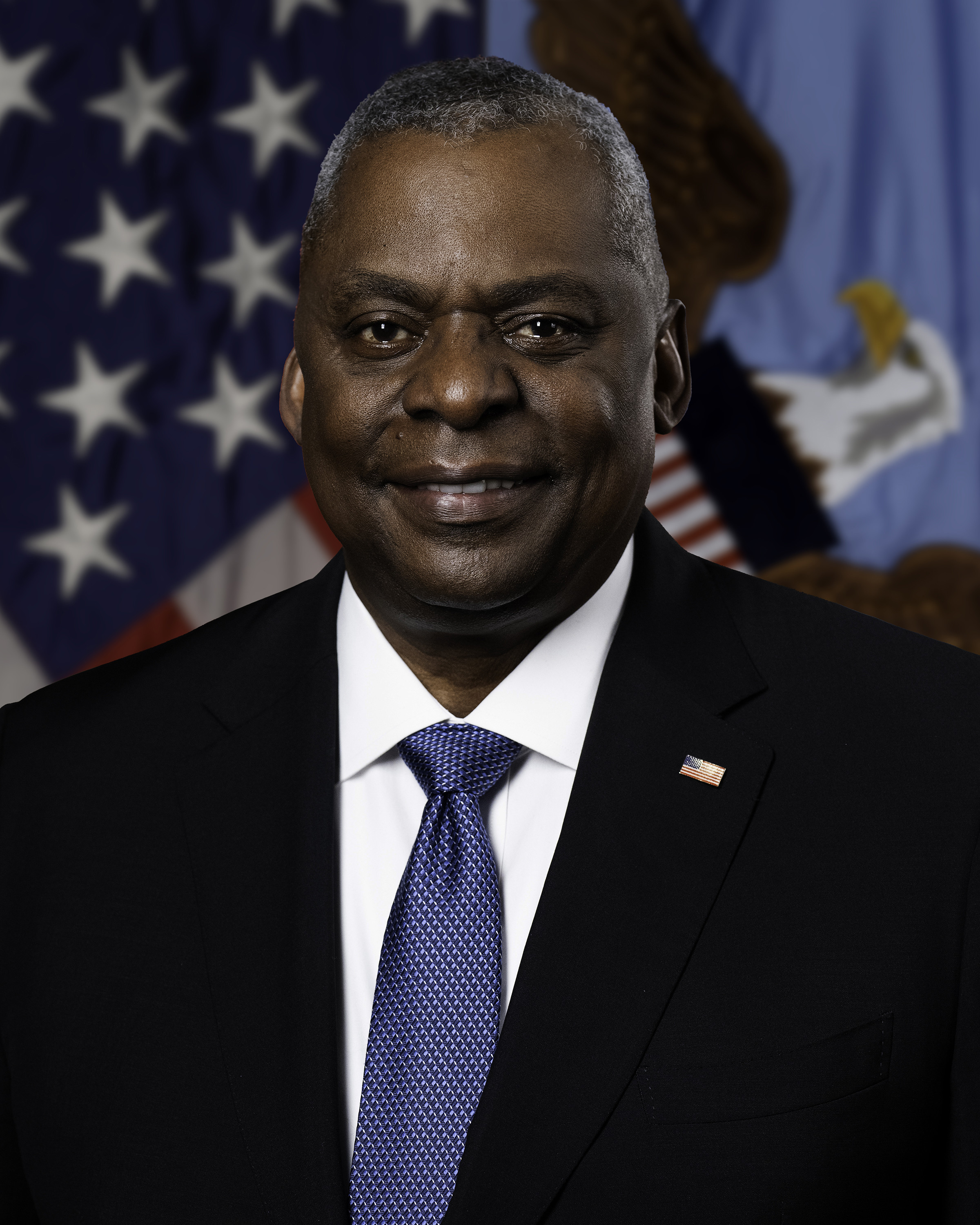
- Official portrait, 2023

28th United States Secretary of Defense
- In office January 22, 2021 – January 20, 2025
- President: Joe Biden
- Deputy: David Norquist; Kathleen Hicks
- Preceded by: Mark Esper
- Succeeded by: Pete Hegseth

12th Commander of United States Central Command
- In office March 22, 2013 – March 30, 2016
- President: Barack Obama
- Preceded by: Jim Mattis
- Succeeded by: Joseph Votel

33rd Vice Chief of Staff of the Army
- In office February 8, 2012 – March 8, 2013
- President: Barack Obama
- Preceded by: Peter W. Chiarelli
- Succeeded by: John Campbell

40th Director of the Joint Staff
- In office August 9, 2009 – June 30, 2010
- President: Barack Obama
- Preceded by: Stanley A. McChrystal
- Succeeded by: William E. Gortney

Personal details
- Born: Lloyd James Austin III; August 8, 1953 (age 73) Mobile, Alabama, U.S.
- Party: Independent
- Spouse: Charlene Banner (m. 1980)
- Education: United States Military Academy (BS); Auburn University (MA); Webster University (MBA)

Military service
- Branch/service: United States Army
- Years of service: 1975–2016
- Rank: General
- Commands: United States Central Command; Vice Chief of Staff of the Army; United States Forces – Iraq; Multi-National Corps – Iraq; XVIII Airborne Corps; 10th Mountain Division; 3rd Brigade, 82nd Airborne Division; 2nd Battalion, 505th Parachute Infantry Regiment
- Battles/wars: War in Afghanistan; Iraq War; Operation Inherent Resolve
- Awards: Full list
- Austin's voice Austin answering questions on Swedish and Finnish accession to NATO. Recorded February 15, 2023

Lloyd James Austin III (born August 8, 1953) is a retired United States Army general who served as the 28th United States secretary of defense from 2021 to 2025 under the Biden administration.

Before retiring from the military in 2016, Austin served as the 12th commander of United States Central Command (CENTCOM), beginning in March 2013. Prior to that he served as the 33rd vice chief of staff of the Army from January 2012 to March 2013, and as commander of United States Forces – Iraq from September 2010 to December 2011. He is the first African American to hold each of these positions. After retiring from the armed services, Austin joined the boards of Raytheon Technologies, Nucor, Tenet Healthcare, and Auburn University. On December 7, 2020, he was nominated for defense secretary by president-elect Joe Biden and was confirmed by the United States Senate on January 22, 2021, by a vote of 93–2.

Austin holds the unique distinction of having commanded in combat in Iraq and Afghanistan at the one-, two-, three- and four-star levels, and was the first African American to command a division, corps, and field army in combat. He is a recipient of the Silver Star, the nation's third highest award for valor, for his actions during the Iraq invasion, as well as five Defense Distinguished Service Medals.

== Early life and education ==
Lloyd James Austin III was born on August 8, 1953, in Mobile, Alabama. He was raised in Thomasville, Georgia. In 1975, he graduated from the United States Military Academy at West Point with a Bachelor of Science degree. While at the academy, Austin played rugby and ran track. He later earned a Master of Arts degree in counselor education from Auburn University's College of Education in 1986, and a Master of Business Administration in business management from Webster University in 1989. He is a graduate of the Infantry Officer Basic and Advanced courses, the Army Command and General Staff College, and the Army War College.

== U.S. Army officer (1975–2016) ==
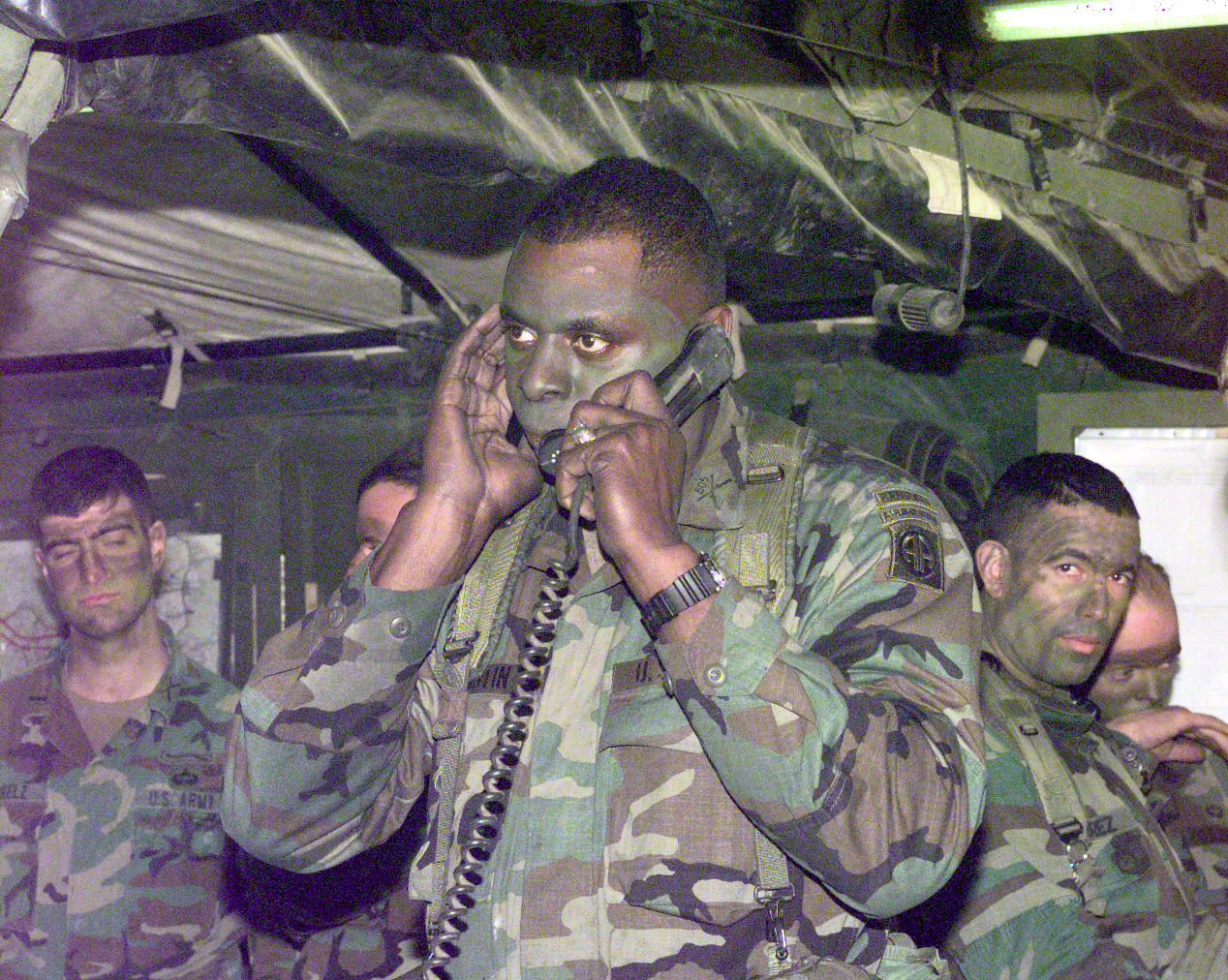
Colonel Lloyd Austin in 1998

In June 1975, Austin graduated from West Point and was commissioned in the Infantry as a second lieutenant. He completed Airborne and Ranger schools prior to receiving his initial assignment in Germany with the 3rd Infantry Division (Mechanized) as a rifle platoon leader and later as a scout platoon leader and company executive officer in 1st Battalion, 7th Infantry.

Following this assignment and attendance at the Infantry Officer Advanced Course, he was assigned to the 82nd Airborne Division at Fort Bragg, North Carolina, where he commanded the Combat Support Company, 2nd Battalion (Airborne), 508th Infantry and served as the Assistant S-3 (Operations) for 1st Brigade. In 1981, Austin was assigned to Indianapolis, Indiana, where he was the operations officer for the Army Indianapolis District Recruiting Command, and where he later commanded a company in the Army Recruiting Battalion. Upon conclusion of this assignment, he attended Auburn University, where he completed studies for a Master's in education. He then returned to West Point as a company tactical officer.

After completion of the Army Command and General Staff College, Fort Leavenworth, Kansas, he was assigned to the 10th Mountain Division (Light Infantry), Fort Drum, New York, where he served as the S-3 (Operations) and later executive officer for the 2nd Battalion, 22nd Infantry. He subsequently served as Executive Officer for 1st Brigade, 10th Mountain, and later Director of Plans, Training, Mobilization, and Security for Fort Drum.

In 1993, Austin returned to the 82nd Airborne Division where he commanded the 2nd Battalion (Airborne), 505th Infantry. He later served as G-3 for the 82nd.

Following graduation from Army War College, Carlisle, Pennsylvania, he returned to the 82nd Airborne Division for a third tour of duty there to command 3rd Brigade.

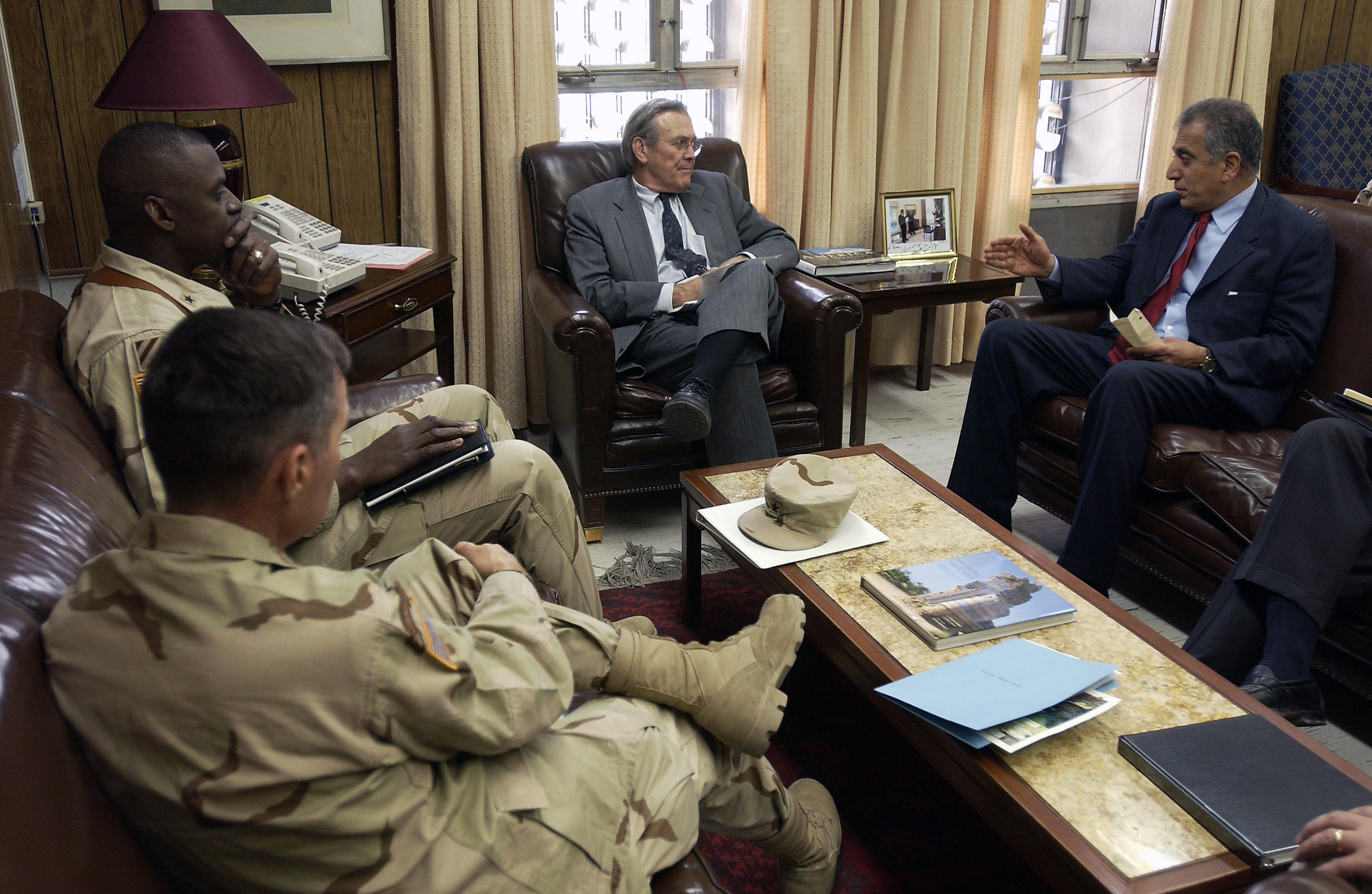
Austin in a meeting with Secretary of Defense Donald Rumsfeld, Lieutenant General David Barno, and U.S. ambassador to Afghanistan Zalmay Khalilzad in Kandahar, Afghanistan in 2003

Shortly after brigade command, he served as Chief, Joint Operations Division, J-3, on the Joint Staff at the Pentagon in Arlington, Virginia. His next assignment, in 2001, was as Assistant Division Commander for Maneuver (ADC-M), 3rd Infantry Division (Mechanized), Fort Stewart, Georgia. As the ADC-M, he helped lead the division's invasion of Iraq in March 2003. Leading the fight from the front, Austin traveled the 500 miles from Kuwait to Baghdad in his command and control vehicle. The division reached Baghdad and secured the city. Austin was awarded a Silver Star, the nation's third highest award for valor, for his actions as commander during the invasion.

Commanding General of 10th Mtn Division (Light) and CJTF-180 – Afghanistan

Austin served from September 2003 until August 2005 as Commanding General of 10th Mountain Division, with duty as Commander, Combined Joint Task Force 180, during the War in Afghanistan. He was the first African American to serve as a U.S. Army division commander in combat. He subsequently served as Chief of Staff of US Central Command at MacDill AFB in Tampa, Florida, from September 2005 until October 2006.

Commanding General of Multi-National Corps – Iraq

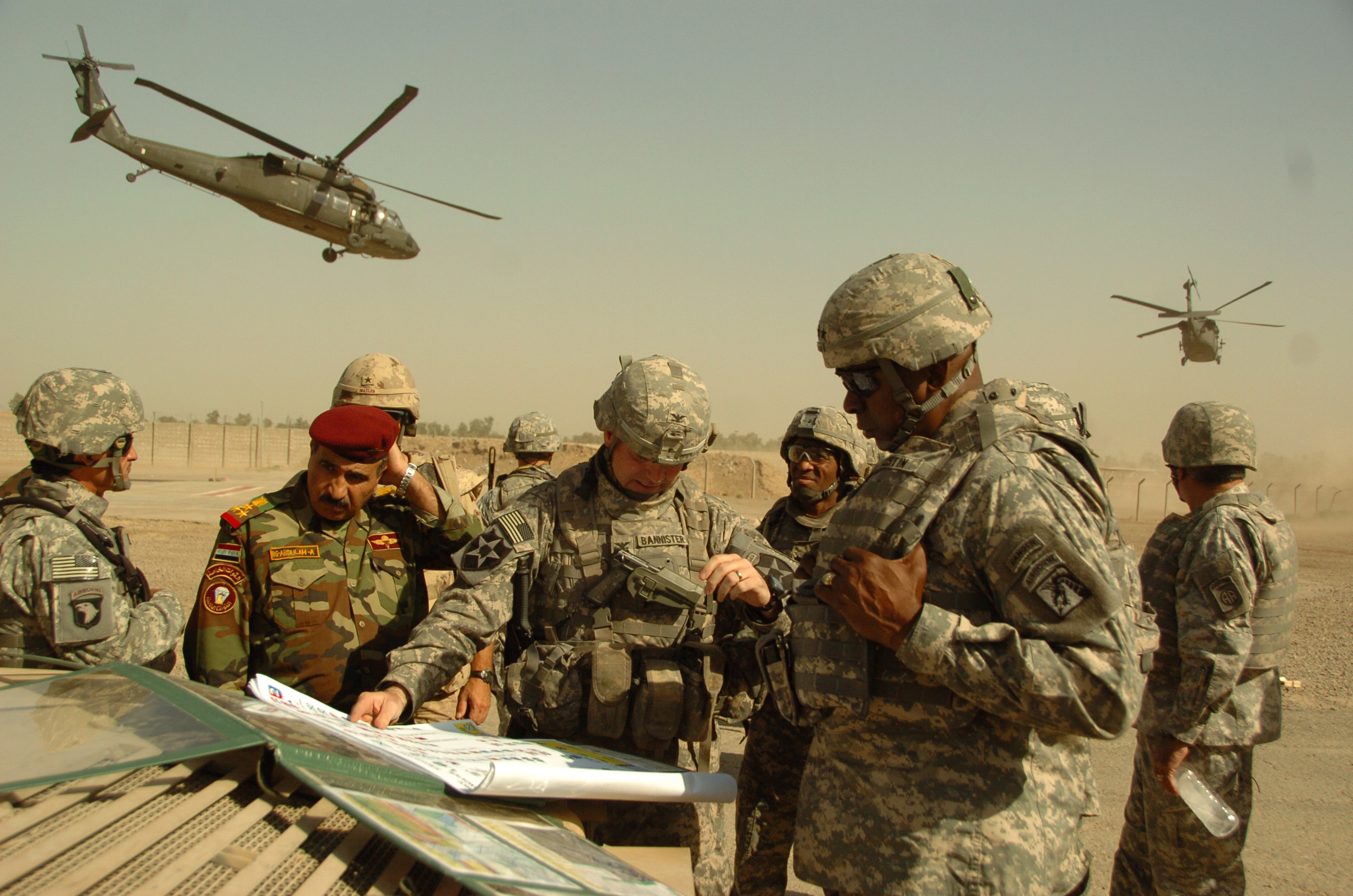
Austin during the Iraq War on September 11, 2007

On December 8, 2006, Austin was promoted to lieutenant general and assumed command of XVIII Airborne Corps, Fort Bragg, North Carolina. In February 2008, Austin became the second highest ranking commander in Iraq, taking command of the Multi-National Corps – Iraq (MNC-I). As commander of MNC-I, he directed the operations of approximately 152,000 joint and coalition forces across all sectors of Iraq. He was the first African American general officer to lead a corps-sized element in combat. Austin assumed the mission during the period when the Surge forces were drawing down. He expertly oversaw the responsible transition of forces out of the country while ensuring that progress continued on the ground.

Austin handed over command of XVIII Corps to become Director of the Joint Staff in August 2009. This promotion came at the direction of Admiral Michael Mullen, then chairman of the Joint Chiefs of Staff. Austin credited the appointment as having jumpstarted his later career, saying: "People who might not have known Lloyd Austin began to know him."

=== Commanding General of US Forces – Iraq ===
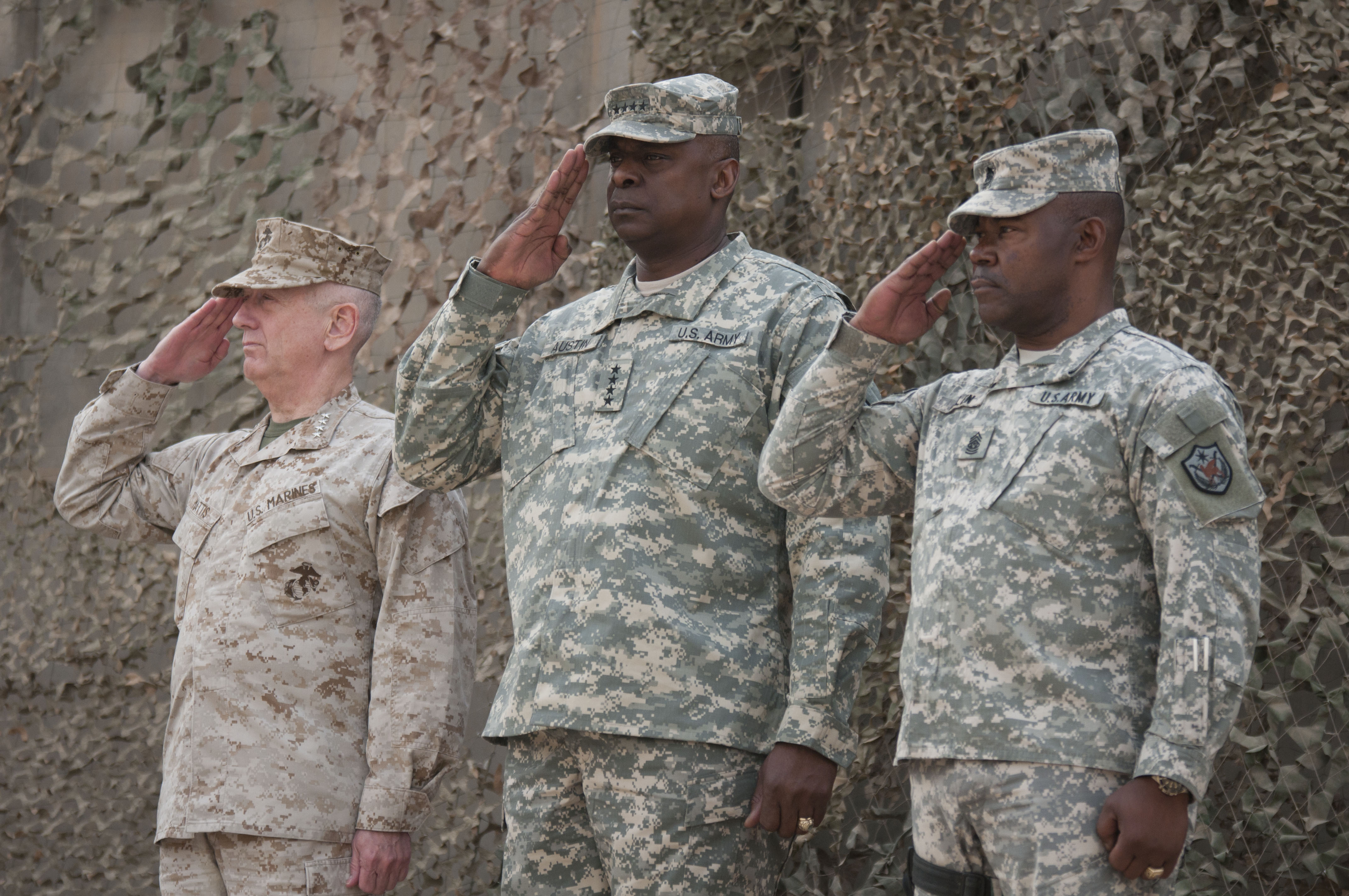
General Lloyd Austin, commander of United States Forces-Iraq with General James Mattis (left), commander of United States Central Command, and CSM Joseph R. Allen (right), during the United States Forces-Iraq end of mission ceremony on December 15, 2011. Both generals would later serve as defense secretaries.

On September 1, 2010, at a ceremony at Al-Faw Palace in Baghdad, Austin was promoted to the rank of general, becoming the Army's 200th four-star general officer and the sixth African American in the U.S. Army to achieve the top rank. He subsequently assumed the role of Commanding General (CG) of United States Forces – Iraq (USF-I), becoming the first African American in history to command an entire theater of war. He was preceded in the role by General Ray Odierno. As CG, USF-I, Austin was the senior military commander in charge of all US and remaining coalition forces in Iraq. Their mission was to advise, train, assist, and equip the Iraqi Armed Forces and the security agencies part of the Ministry of the Interior. As commander, Austin requested an additional troop presence in Iraq from 14,000 to 18,000.

Austin oversaw the transition from Operation Iraqi Freedom and combat operations to Operation New Dawn and stability operations focused on advising, assisting, and training the ISF. He was extensively involved in the internal U.S. discussions and then negotiations with the Iraqi Government leading up to the signing of the Strategic Partnership Agreement. Opposing total U.S. withdrawal, Austin preferred that the U.S. maintain about 10,000 troops in Iraq after 2011 and he approved staff planning for up to 20,000 remaining troops.

In the absence of a new Status of Forces Agreement, President Barack Obama made the decision to retrograde all U.S. forces out of Iraq by the end of 2011. Austin oversaw the entire operation, concurrently planning and executing the orderly drawdown and redeployment of approximately 50,000 service members. The U.S. command in Iraq formally cased its colors on December 15, 2011, at a reduced-sized BIAP complex, and Austin's speech there cited his division's seizure of the airport over eight years beforehand. Austin, along with other members of the USF-I staff, departed Iraq on December 18, 2011.

=== Army Vice Chief of Staff ===
In December 2011, Austin was nominated to become Vice Chief of Staff of the United States Army (VCSA). He took office on January 31, 2012. As VCSA, he managed the day-to-day administration of the Army's budget and headquarters staff. Under his direction, the Army took steps to reduce the incidence of suicide in the ranks. He also spearheaded the Army's efforts to increase awareness and improve treatment options for the "invisible wounds" of war, namely traumatic brain injuries and post-traumatic stress.

=== United States Central Command ===
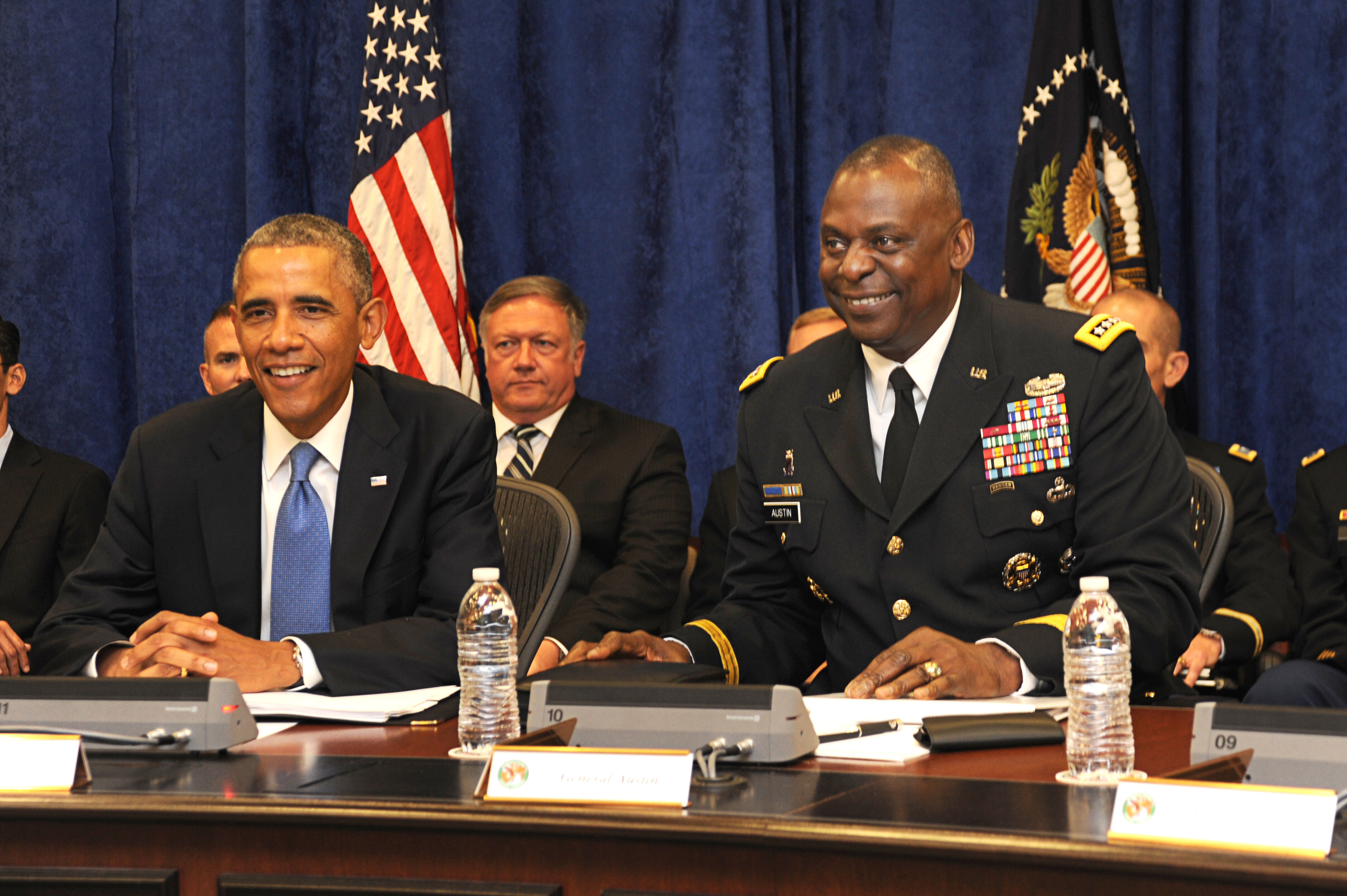
General Lloyd Austin with President Barack Obama at MacDill Air Force Base, September 17, 2014

Austin became the commander of CENTCOM on March 22, 2013, after being nominated by President Obama in late 2012. Austin was preceded as CENTCOM commander by General James Mattis, whom Austin would later succeed as secretary of defense. In his capacity as CENTCOM Commander, General Austin oversaw all U.S. troops deployed and major U.S. military operations around the area of Middle-East and Central and South Asia. The area consisted of 20 countries including Iraq, Syria, Yemen, Afghanistan, Egypt and Lebanon.

Austin directed the activities of four service component commands, one subordinate unified command (U.S. Forces-Afghanistan/Resolute Support Mission), two major subordinate multi-service commands, and several temporary task forces actively engaged in military operations. Austin oversaw more than 150,000 American and Coalition forces involved in operations throughout the region.

During his tenure, Austin routinely advised the president, the secretary of defense, and other national-level leadership on challenges afflicting the CENTCOM region, and directed U.S. and allied military response to multiple crises and operations. These included the explosive crisis and transition of power in Egypt (2013–14); the resurgence of Al Qaeda's affiliate in the Arabian Peninsula; the Huthi-led insurgency against the Hadi government and the civil war in Yemen; continued support for the operations in Afghanistan against Al Qaeda and other extremist groups; malign activity by Iran's Revolutionary Guard Corps-Qods Forces; and the rise of the Islamic State of Iraq and the Levant (ISIL) in Iraq and Syria (also known as the Islamic State of Iraq and Syria (ISIS)).

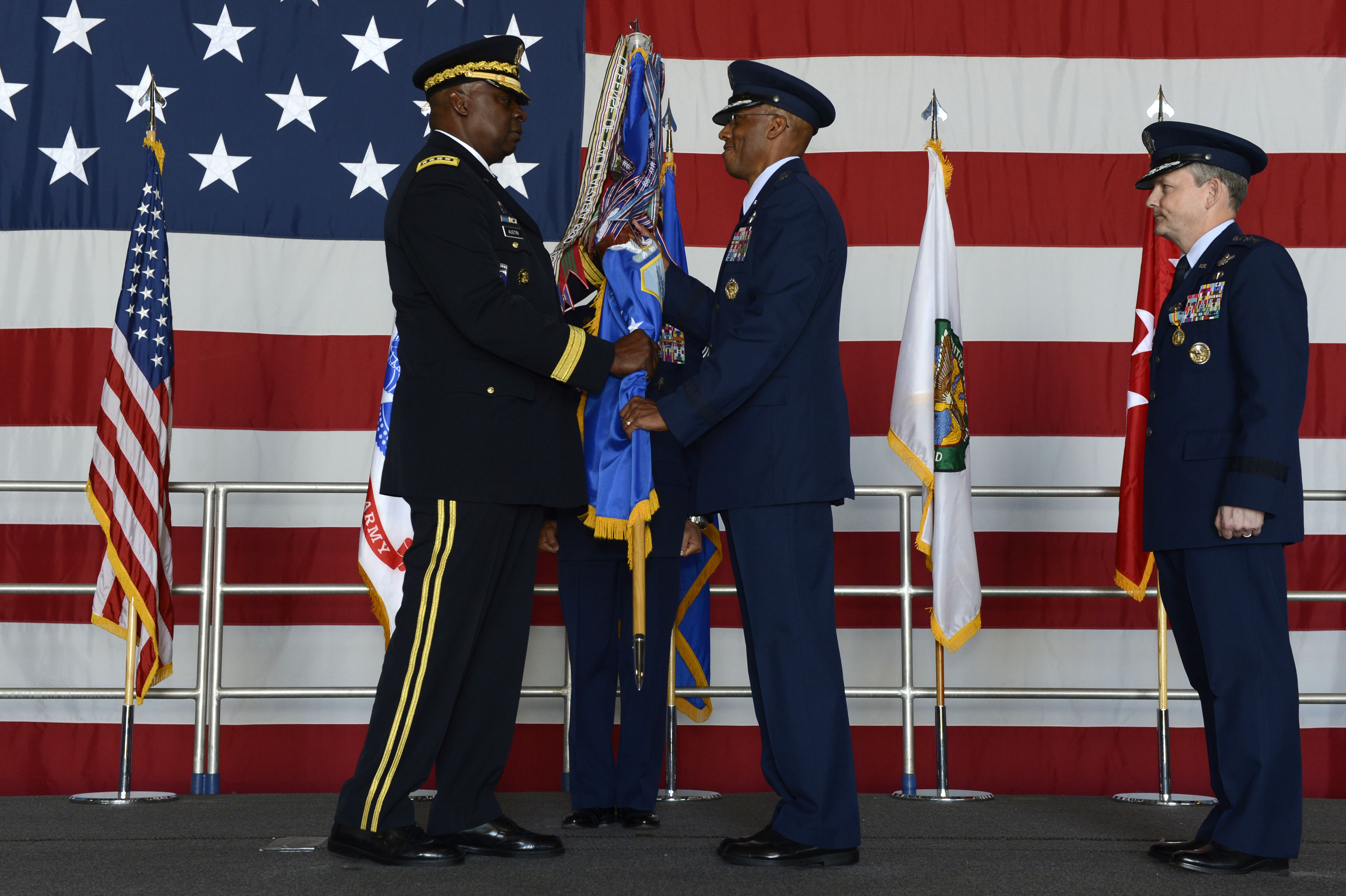
General Lloyd Austin with Lieutenant General Charles Q. Brown Jr. during the Air Forces Central Command change of command ceremony at Shaw Air Force Base, June 29, 2015

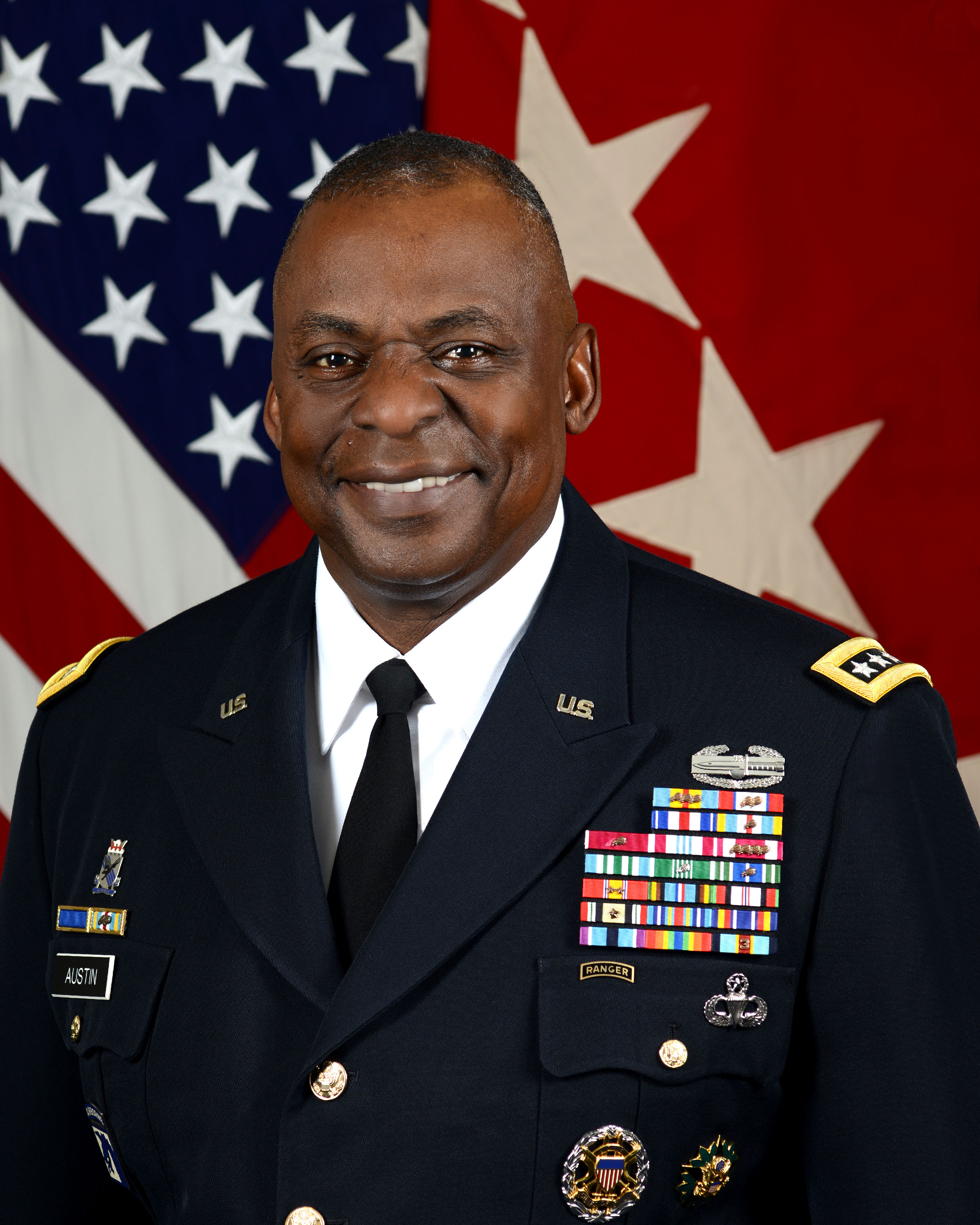
General Austin in 2016

As commander, after ISIL seized control of Mosul in June 2014, Austin oversaw the development and execution of the coalition military campaign plan to counter ISIL in Iraq and Syria, named Combined Joint Task Force – Operation Inherent Resolve (CJTF-OIR). At its peak, ISIL (also referred to as Daesh) controlled nearly 110,000 square kilometers of territory, including major cities in both Iraq and Syria, and attracted more than 40,000 foreign terrorist fighters. As of October 2014, Austin argued that the U.S. military's primary focus in operations against ISIL should be Iraq. The military campaign to counter ISIL consisted of multiple elements occurring simultaneously or near-simultaneously, including: 1) employing a coalition effort in Iraq to halt the advance of ISIL and to enable the Iraqis to regain their territory and reestablish control over their borders; 2) containing ISIL, in part by ensuring coalition partners have the capacity to secure their sovereign borders; 3) enabling the moderate Syrian opposition forces through a coalition-led train and equip program; and 4) eliminating ungoverned spaces out of which ISIL and other terrorist groups were able to operate.

In its first year, CJTF-OIR conducted over 8,000 airstrikes against ISIL targets in Iraq and Syria. Between 2014 and 2017, ISIL lost 95 percent of the territory they once controlled. By July 2017, Mosul was once again under the control of the Iraqi government, and by December 2017, ISIL had lost all control of territory in Iraq.

On April 15, 2024, Secretary Austin marked 10 years of the global coalition to defeat ISIL, while welcoming Iraqi Prime Minister Mohammed Shia al-Sudani to the Pentagon. "In 2019, thanks to the courage and sacrifices of the Iraqi security forces and our partners in Operation Inherent Resolve, together, we achieved the territorial defeat of Daesh [another name for ISIL]. But Daesh remains a threat to your citizens and to ours," Austin said.

Austin's retirement ceremony took place at Joint Base Myer–Henderson Hall on April 5, 2016. During his departure and retirement ceremony, General Austin said that he was extremely proud of the achievements of the troops under his command. He said "I'm very proud to have had the opportunity to lead troops in combat, I have seen our young leaders do amazing things in really tough and dangerous situations."

== Private sector ==
Immediately after retiring as CENTCOM Commander, Austin joined the board of Raytheon Technologies, a military contractor, in April 2016. As of October 2020, his Raytheon stock holdings were worth roughly $500,000 and his compensation, including stock, totaled $2.7 million. On September 18, 2017, he was appointed to Nucor's board of directors. On May 29, 2018, Austin was appointed as an independent director on the board of Tenet Healthcare. He also operates a consulting firm and has been a partner at Pine Island Capital, an investment company with which Secretary of State Antony Blinken and Michèle Flournoy are affiliated.

== U.S. Secretary of Defense (2021–2025) ==
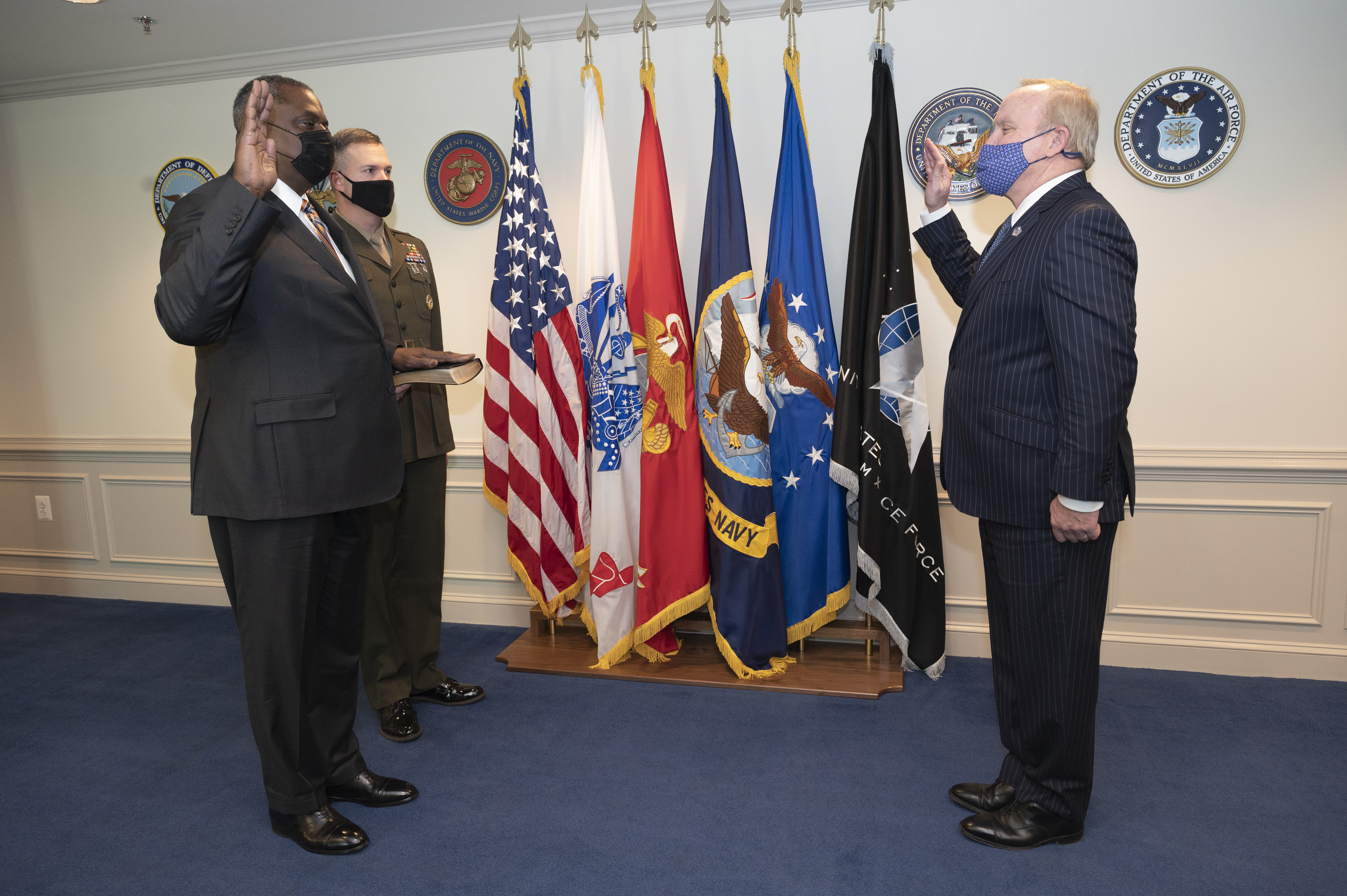
Austin being sworn in as secretary of defense at the Pentagon on January 22, 2021

=== Nomination and confirmation ===
On December 7, 2020, it was reported that President-elect Joe Biden would nominate Austin as secretary of defense. Biden became acquainted with Austin while Austin was CENTCOM commander in the Obama administration, and reportedly grew to trust Austin after receiving his briefings. Like former defense secretary James Mattis, Austin required a congressional waiver of the National Security Act of 1947 to bypass the seven-year waiting period after leaving active-duty military, as prescribed by 10 U.S.C. § 113 (a), in order to be appointed as secretary of defense. Austin's nomination, and the attendant requirement for a waiver, met with some concern in Congress regarding its implications for civil–military relations. Former secretary of defense Robert Gates and former secretary of state Colin Powell, among others, issued statements supporting Austin's nomination.

The Senate Armed Services Committee held a confirmation hearing for Austin on January 19, 2021. On January 21, Congress granted Austin a waiver of the seven-year requirement by a 326–78 vote in the House and a 69–27 vote in the Senate. He was confirmed by the Senate in a 93–2 vote on January 22, 2021. Republican senators Josh Hawley and Mike Lee were the only "no" votes. Upon his confirmation and swearing-in later that day, Austin became the first African American Secretary of Defense. Austin took office on January 22, 2021, after being sworn in by a Defense Department official, and was later sworn in ceremonially by Vice President Kamala Harris on January 25, 2021.

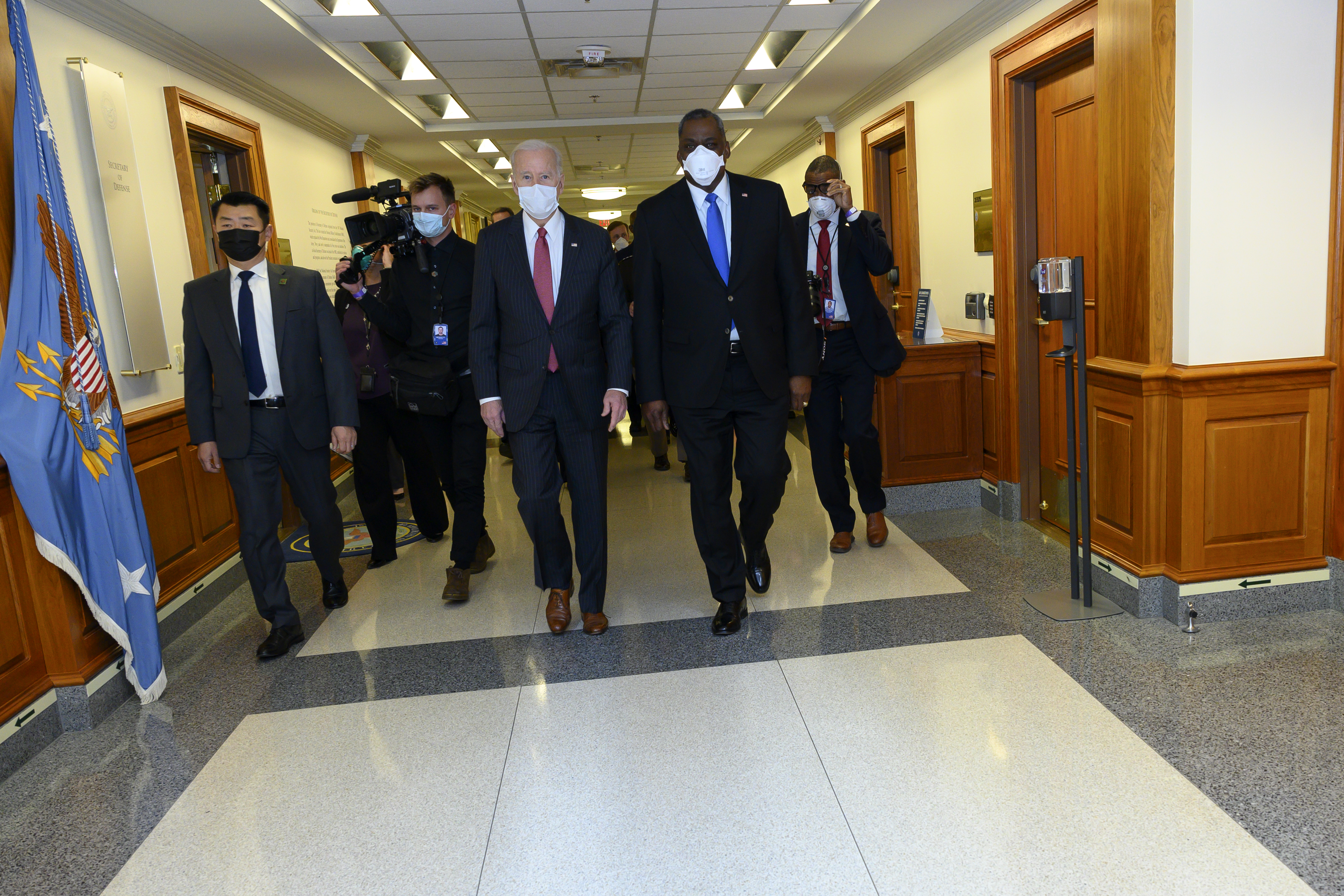
U.S. secretary of defense Lloyd Austin with U.S. president Joe Biden at the Pentagon on February 10, 2021

=== Tenure ===
Upon assuming the office, Austin announced his top three priorities for the Defense Department in a memorandum issued to all DoD employees. It stated in part:

As the Secretary of Defense, I am committed to ensuring that the Department develops the right people, priorities, and purpose of mission to continue to defend our Nation from enemies foreign and domestic. This will require aligning our priorities and capabilities to a changing and dynamic threat landscape. We will do so in a way that is based on a sober assessment of our strategic needs and recognize the importance of building and sustaining a strong workforce and unity within our Department, across the Nation and with our allies and partners around the world. Three priorities – defending the Nation, taking care of our people, and succeeding through teamwork – will guide our efforts.

On March 28, 2023, Austin testified before the Senate Armed Services Committee on DoD's Budget Request for Fiscal Year 2024 and the Future Years Defense Program. In his opening statement he reiterated the objectives of the 2022 National Defense Strategy (NDS):

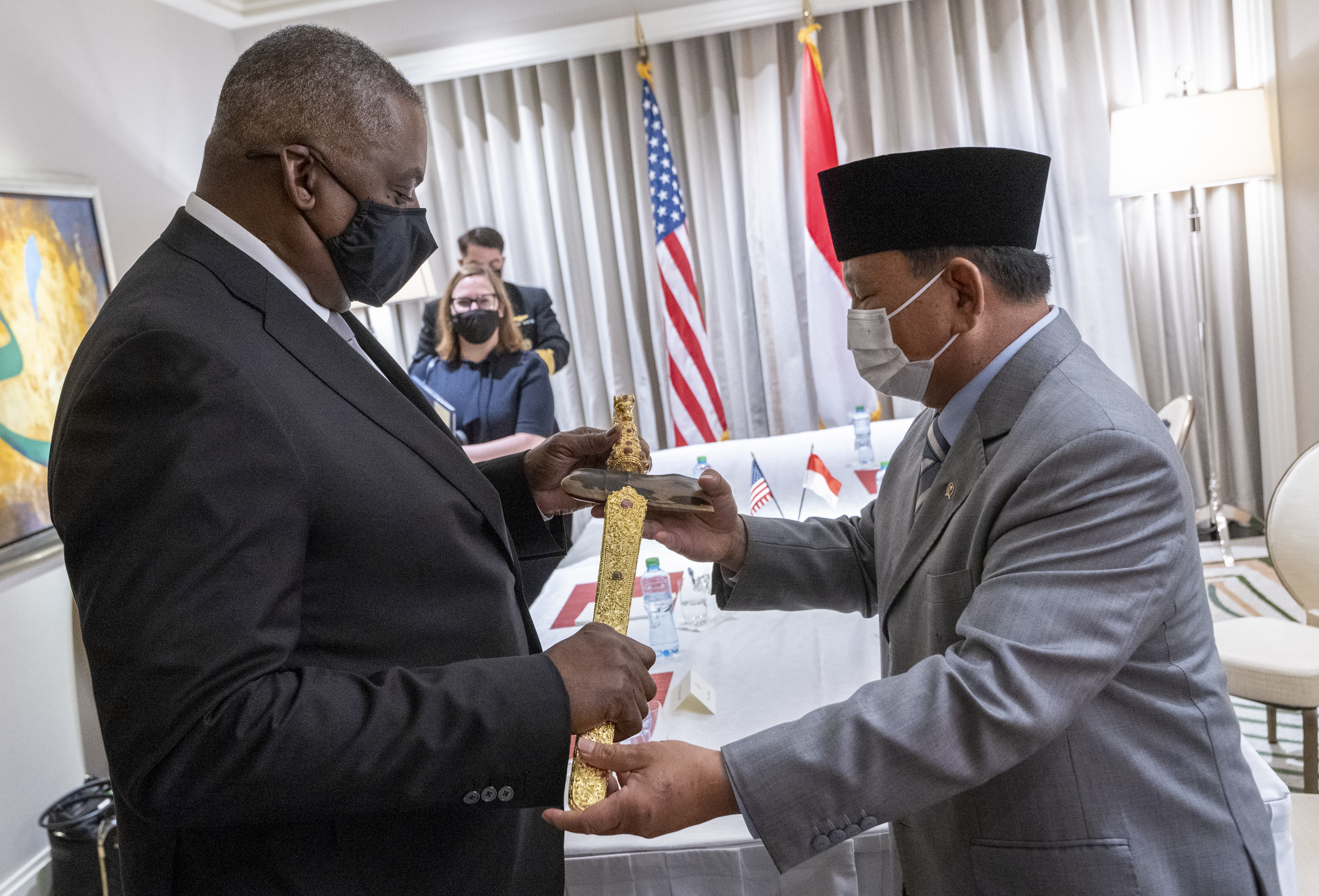
Austin with Indonesian defense minister Prabowo Subianto in Manama, Bahrain on November 20, 2021

The NDS directs the Department to act urgently to sustain and strengthen U.S. deterrence, with the [People's Republic of China] as our pacing challenge. The NDS also directs the Department to tackle the acute threat of Russia, as well as the persistent threats from Iran, the Democratic People's Republic of Korea (DPRK), and global terrorist groups. The NDS clearly articulates our priorities: defend the homeland from the growing, multi-domain challenge posed by the PRC; deter strategic attacks against the United States, our Allies, and our Partners; deter aggression, while preparing to prevail in conflict if necessary, by prioritizing the PRC challenge in the Indo-Pacific, followed by the Russian challenge in Europe; and build a resilient Joint Force and defense ecosystem.

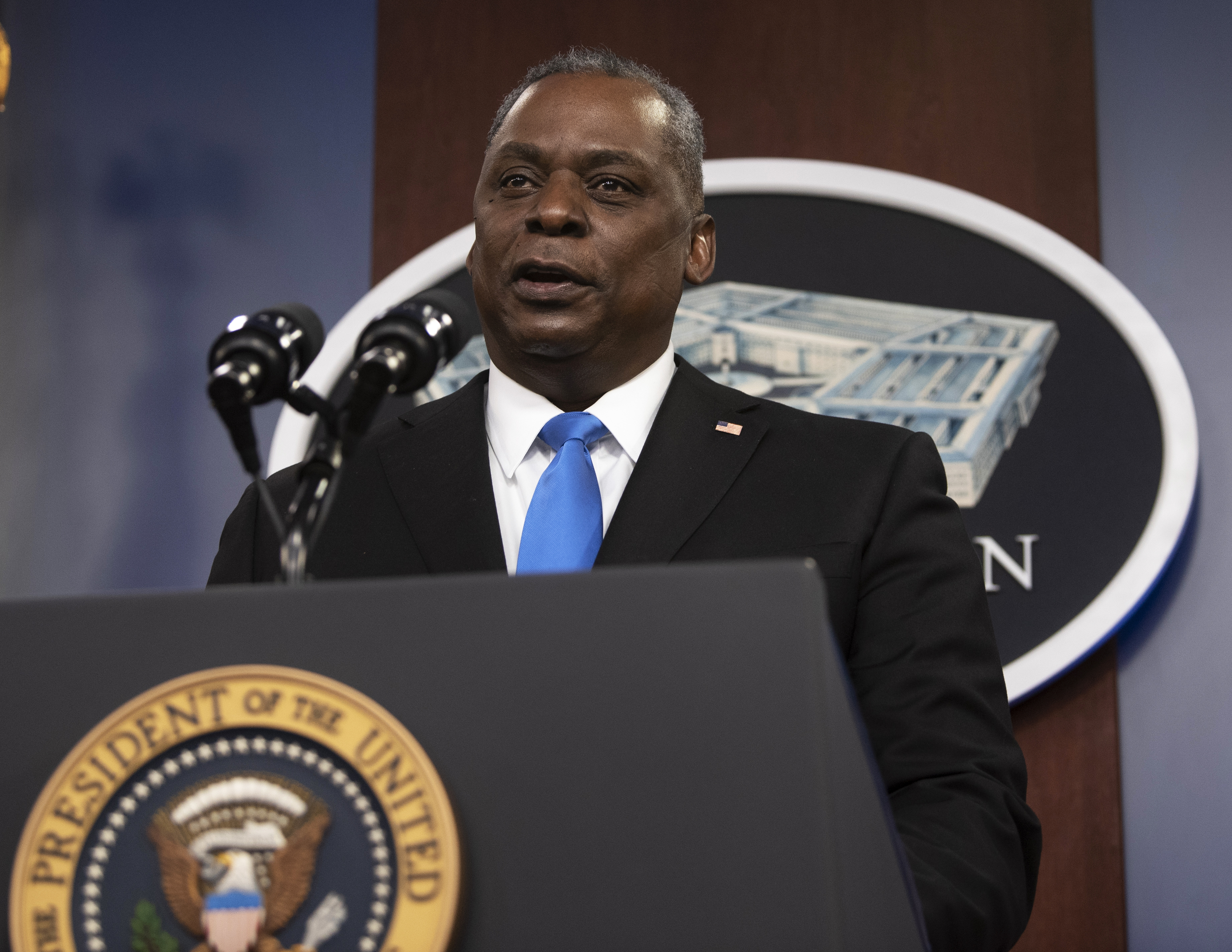
Austin speaks to Department of Defense personnel in February 2021

Part of Austin's primary agenda as secretary of defense was the DoD's plan to confront the COVID-19 pandemic within the department. Austin's first step was to urge service members to get vaccinated, especially after the revelation that almost one-third of active-duty service members had turned down the opportunity to get administered the vaccine. In order to tout the safety of the coronavirus vaccine, Austin took the vaccine himself and also emphasized that taking the coronavirus vaccine will prevent disease among the troops, particularly those who were deployed overseas.

==== Failure to disclose hospitalization ====
On January 1, 2024, Austin was hospitalized at Walter Reed National Military Medical Center due to complications following a minimally invasive surgical procedure conducted on December 22, 2023, to address his prostate cancer (prostatectomy). On January 2, Austin began experiencing fever and chills and shallow breathing. The medical staff decided to transfer him to the critical-care unit for closer monitoring and better team care by his doctors. Austin spent several days in Walter Reed's intensive care unit (ICU) and during that time delegated authority to the deputy secretary of defense Kathleen Hicks. On January 5, he resumed his functions and duties as secretary of defense from the hospital. The cancer was treated early, and Austin's doctors stated that his prognosis was "excellent".

The Department of Defense did not disclose the hospitalization to the President, senior Defense Department officials, senior White House national security staff, members of the U.S. Congress, media outlets, or the public for several days. This failure to disclose contravened established practices of disclosing the medical issues of Cabinet members and senior U.S. officials. President Biden and high-ranking White House officials only learned of Austin's hospitalization three days after it happened, when National Security Advisor Jake Sullivan was informed just before he attended an event at Joint Base Myer–Henderson Hall where Austin was also scheduled to appear. Sullivan subsequently relayed the information to his colleagues and to Biden. During Austin's hospitalization, Hicks performed the duties of secretary of defense.

The Pentagon Press Association, which represents members of the media covering the Defense Department, criticized Austin's multiday disappearance and the ensuing lack of transparency. Some Democratic and Republican members of Congress called on Austin to resign due to the failure to disclose his absence. While stopped at a coffee shop in Allentown, Pennsylvania, a journalist asked Biden, "Do you have confidence in Secretary Austin?" the president responded, "I do." When the journalist asked, "Was it a lapse in judgment for him not to tell you earlier?" Biden said, "Yes."

During a press conference at the Pentagon on February 1, Austin addressed his hospitalization, stating:

I want to be crystal clear. We did not handle this right, and I did not handle this right. I should have told the President about my cancer diagnosis. I should have also told my team and the American public. And I take full responsibility. I apologize to my teammates and to the American people.

Now, I want to make it very clear that there were no gaps in authorities and no risks to the Department's command and control. At every moment, either I or the Deputy Secretary was in full charge. And we've already put in place some new procedures to make sure that any lapses in notification don't happen.

In the future, if the Deputy Secretary needs to temporarily assume the office -- the duties of my office, she and several White House offices will be immediately notified, including the White House Situation Room, and so will key officials across the Department. And the reason for that assumption of duties will be included in writing.

In response to the incident, the White House and the Department of Defense ordered reviews of all notification procedures. An internal 30-day review of the transfer of authority during Austin's hospitalization conducted by the Defense Department's administration and management director in January 2024 found that while processes could be improved, "nothing examined during this review demonstrated any indication of ill intent or an attempt to obfuscate."

On February 29, 2024, Austin testified before the House Armed Services Committee regarding his hospitalization. He took full responsibility, stating: "I did not handle it right. But let me be clear: I never intended to keep my hospitalization from the White House… or from anybody else." Austin also confirmed that at no time was the department absent leadership nor was the U.S. or its interests around the world at risk at any point. He told the Members: "There was never a break in command and control. We transferred authority in a timely fashion. What we didn't do well was the notification of senior leaders."

A January 2025 report from the DoD Office of the Inspector General found that risks to national security were "increased unnecessarily" during Austin's hospitalization. The report did not identify any adverse impacts on operational command and control resulting from Austin's hospitalization, but emphasized the potential for adverse effects.

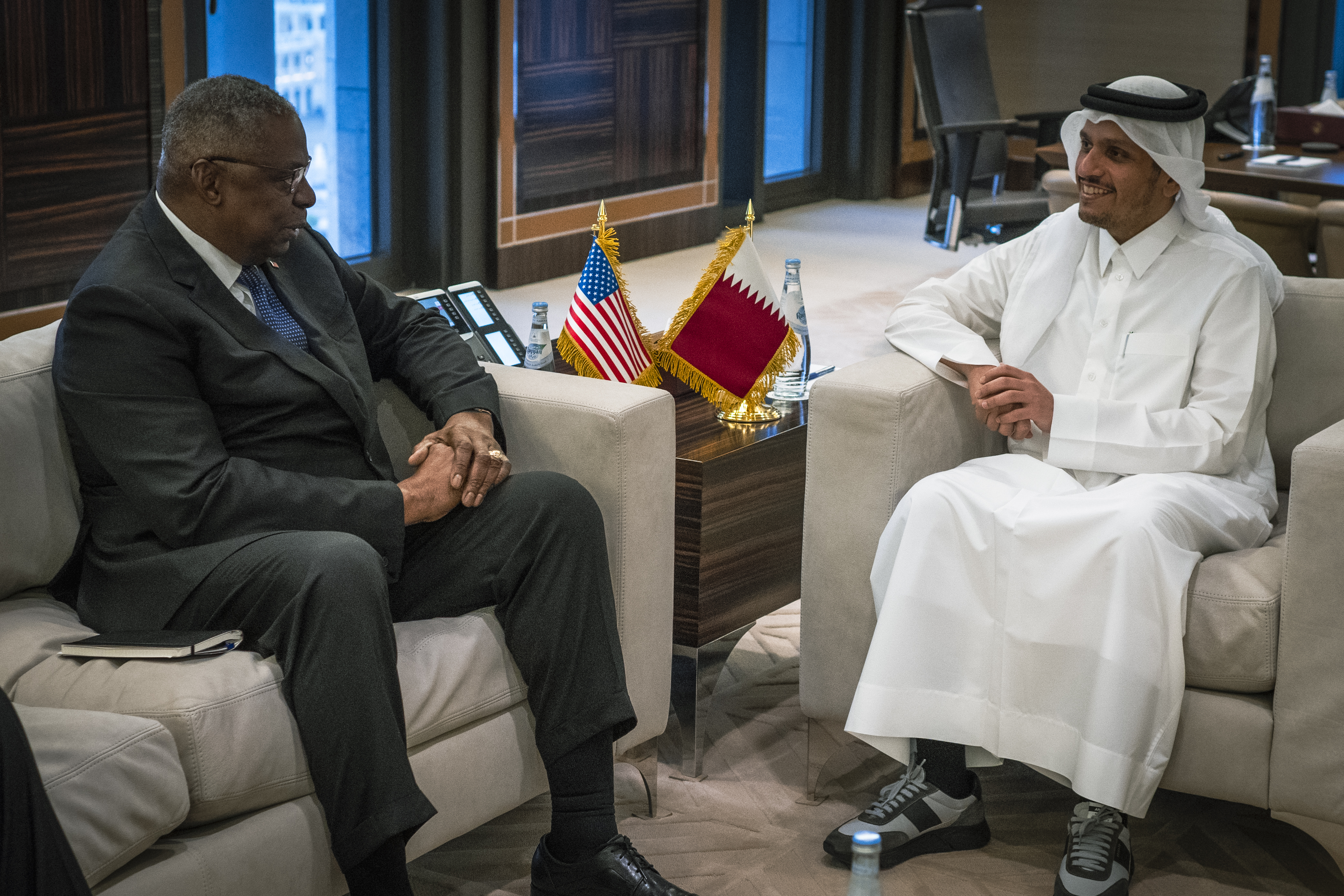
Austin meets with Qatari prime minister Mohammed bin Abdulrahman Al-Thani in Doha, Qatar, December 19, 2023

==== Middle East ====
Throughout his tenure, Austin engaged with civil and military leaders in the Middle East, reinforcing the United States' commitment to partnerships and security in the region. Areas for collaboration between the U.S. and allies include integrated air and missile defense, maritime security, intelligence sharing and early warning systems.

As of August 13, 2024, there were more than 40,000 U.S. troops in the Middle East, according to Pentagon Press Secretary Air Force Maj. Gen. Pat Ryder.

At the AIPAC Political Leadership Forum in January 2023, Austin stated: "Our network of alliances and partnerships is one of America's core strategic strengths. And no other country on Earth has anything like it. And that's especially important in today's Middle East."

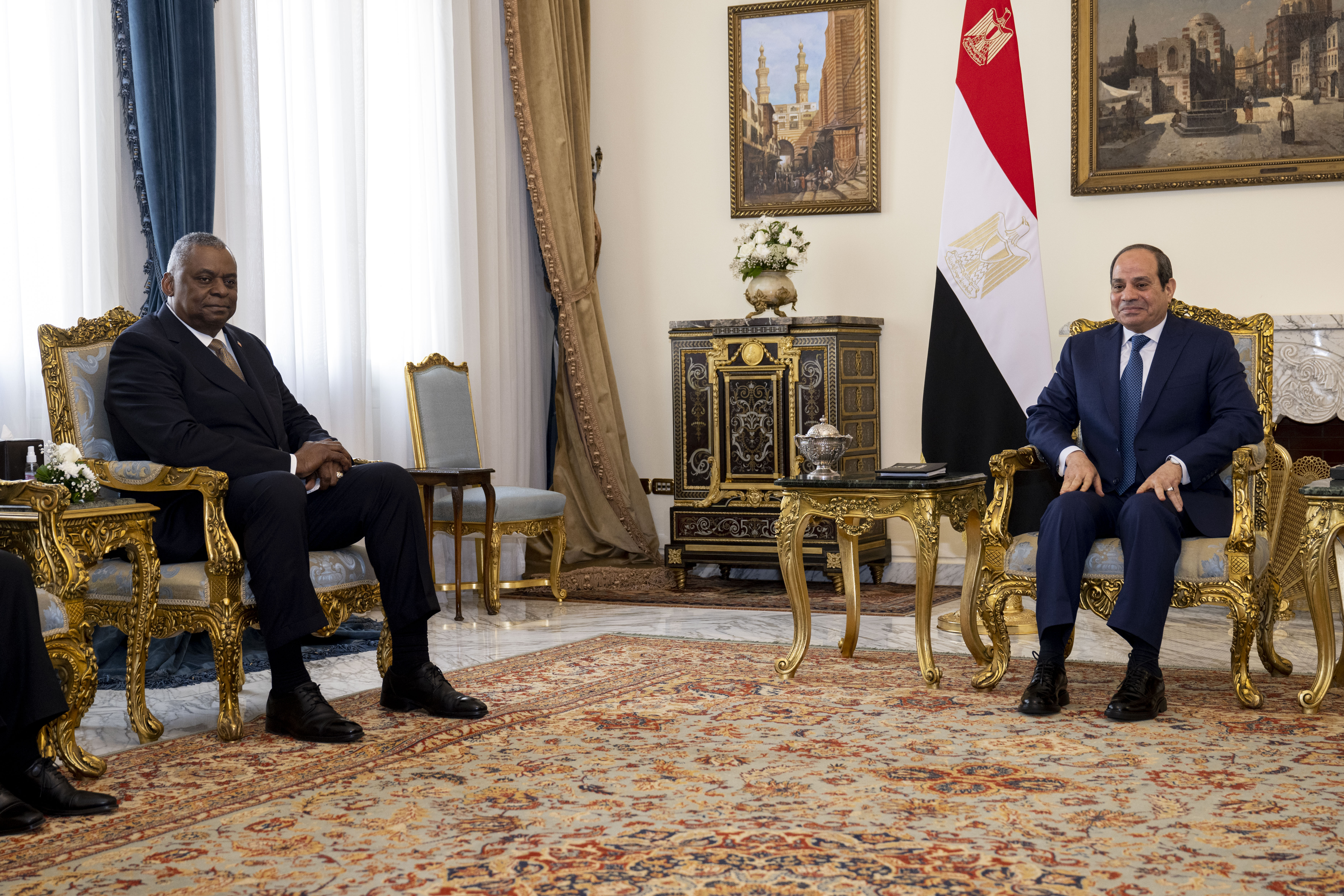
Austin with Egyptian president Abdel Fattah el-Sisi at the Presidential Palace in Cairo, March 8, 2023

During a speech delivered at the Manama Dialogue in Bahrain in November 2021, Austin said: "We do crucial work together with our friends in this [Middle East] region—to deter aggression from any quarter, to disrupt terrorist networks, and to maintain freedom of navigation in some of the world's most important waterways. And over the decades, we have worked side-by-side as you invested in the capabilities to defend yourselves. We've supported you along the way, and we're going to keep doing so. Our forces train together, plan together, and work together—and that makes us stronger together."

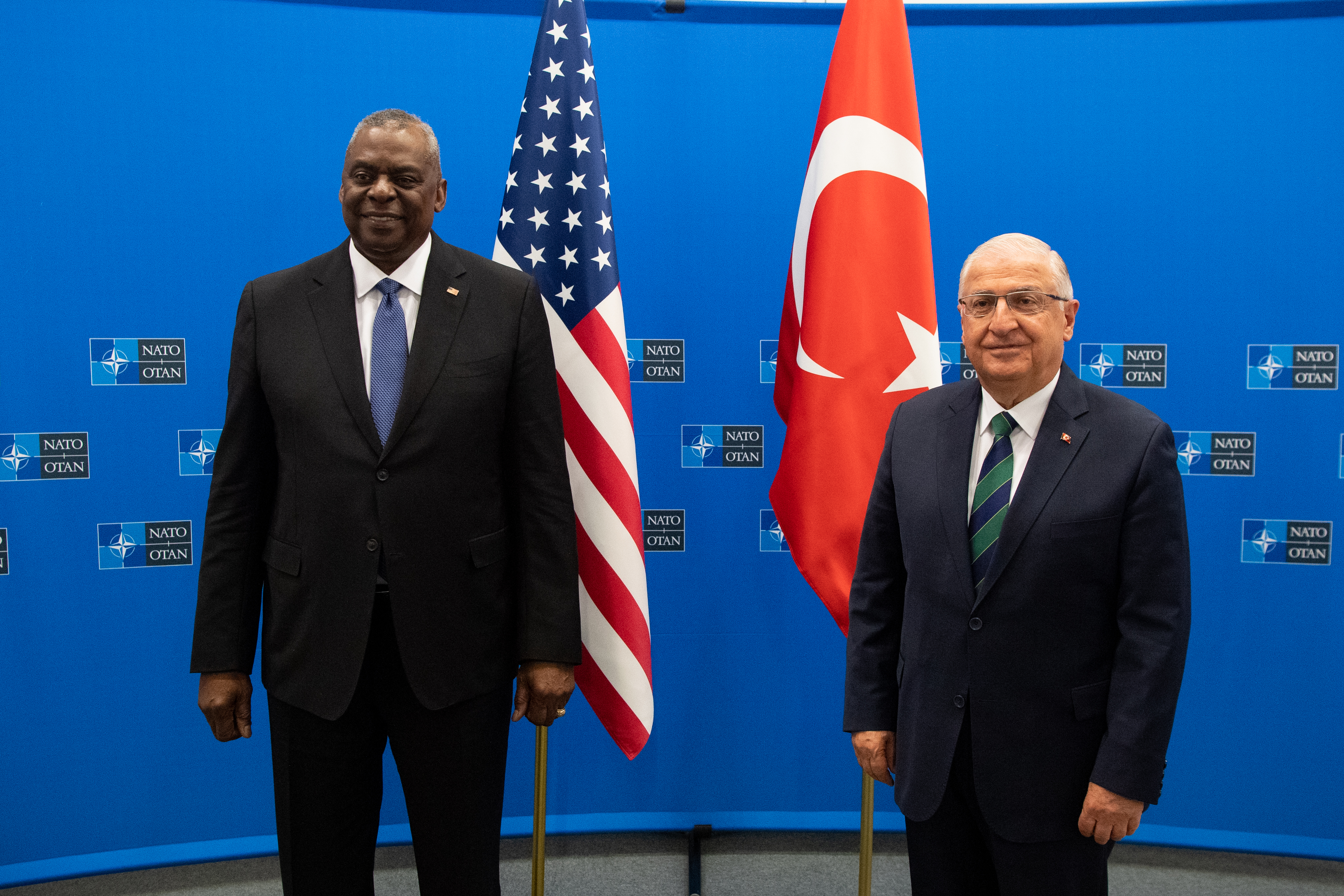
Austin with Turkish defense minister Yaşar Güler at NATO headquarters in Brussels, June 16, 2023

==== Iran ====
During a visit to Israel in March 2023, in a joint press conference with Israeli defense minister Yoav Gallant, Austin said: "Iran remains the primary driver of instability in the region and we remain deeply concerned by Iran's support for terrorism, its dangerous proxies, its nuclear advances, its aggression at sea, its cyber threats, and its proliferation of attack drones and advanced conventional weapons."

At the AIPAC Political Leadership Forum on January 10, 2023, Austin stated:

"Going back to my days at CENTCOM, I have consistently said that the greatest threat to Israeli security, and to the region, is the prospect of a nuclear-armed Iran. We fully understand the dangers of the Iranian government's destabilizing actions—including its support for terrorism, its dangerous proxies, and its threats to wipe Israel off the map. But Iran is also stoking instability across the region—including its support for terrorists and militias, its proliferation of drones, its menacing cyber activities, its maritime aggression, and its continued threats against foreign officials. So Iran's reckless actions don't just threaten Israel. They endanger the entire Middle East and beyond, including by supporting Russia's cruel targeting of civilians in Ukraine. And increasingly, U.S. partners understand the importance of a regional approach to this kind of shared danger. So we're working closely with Israel, our partners in the Middle East, and our allies and partners to impose coordinated pressure on the Iranian regime."

On February 19, 2021, Austin spoke to Saudi crown prince Mohammed bin Salman, saying that "We discussed the continued commitment to the 70-year US-Saudi security partnership, and I'm looking forward to working together to achieve regional security and stability." Austin expressed support for Saudi Arabia in the Iran–Saudi Arabia proxy conflict.

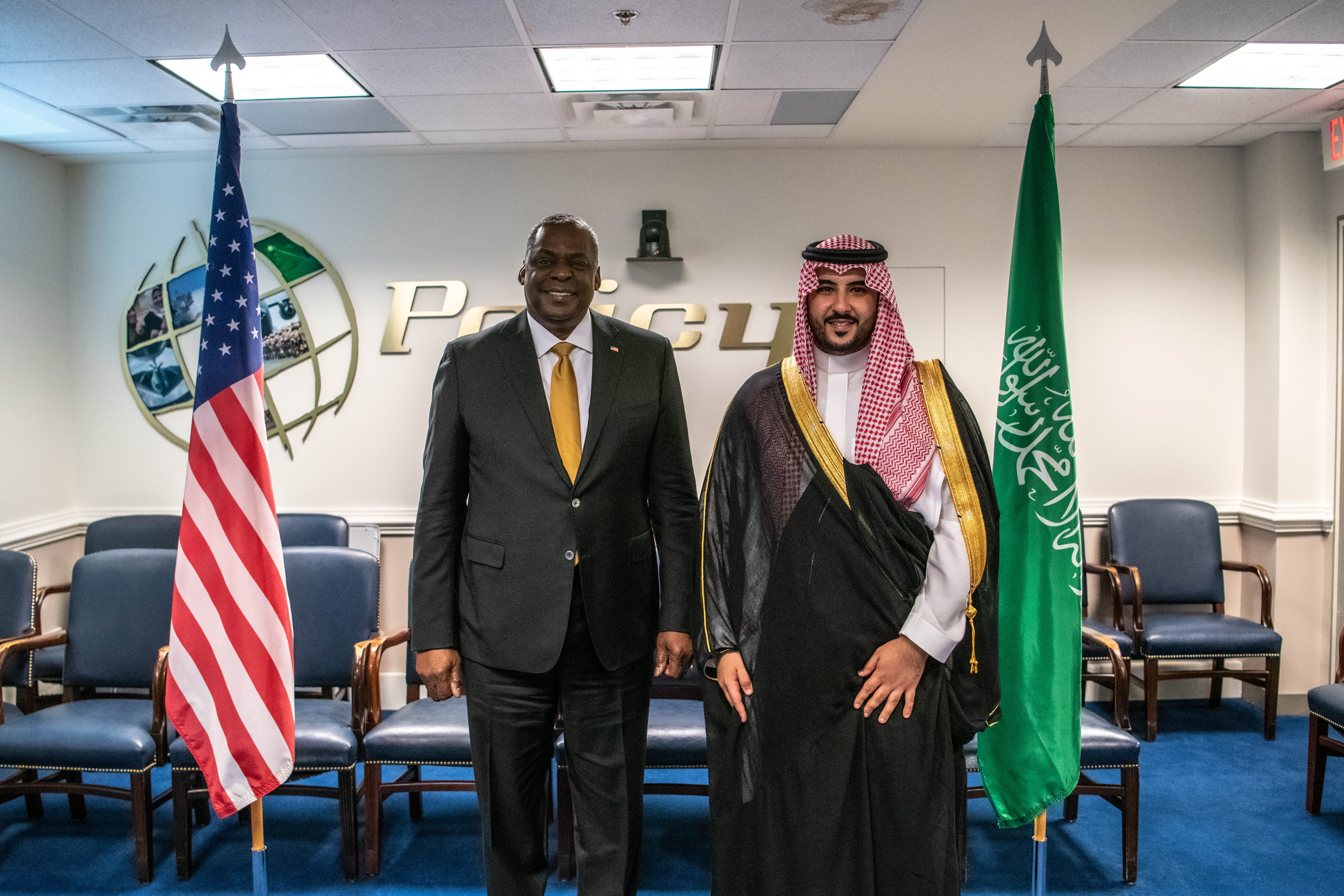
U.S. secretary of defense Lloyd Austin hosts Saudi prince Khalid bin Salman at the Pentagon, July 6, 2021

On February 25, 2021, under Biden's direction, Austin coordinated military defensive airstrikes against an Iranian-backed militia in Syria. Austin had previously recommended such airstrikes as a response to Iranian attacks on Americans in Iraq earlier in the month. It was also believed that the militia is responsible for killing a civilian contractor and injuring one American soldier as well as other troops in a missile attack on February 15, 2021.

==== Combatting terrorism ====
During his testimony before the Senate Armed Services Committee on March 28, 2023, Austin stated that "ISIS, al-Qaeda, and other such a terrorist groups continue to threaten the security of the United States". He also stated there were investments being made to improve the technology used for counterterrorism efforts.

On December 18, 2023, Austin announced the establishment of a multinational maritime task force, Operation Prosperity Guardian, to address attacks from Houthis in Yemen on commercial ships and other targets. According to the Pentagon's December 19 report, Houthis conducted over 100 drone and ballistic missile attacks, targeting 10 merchant vessels involving more than 35 different nations. In a statement issued on October 18, while he was on a trip to the Middle East, Austin said:

“The recent escalation in reckless Houthi attacks originating from Yemen threatens the free flow of commerce, endangers innocent mariners, and violates international law. Operation Prosperity Guardian is bringing together multiple countries to include the United Kingdom, Bahrain, Canada, France, Italy, Netherlands, Norway, Seychelles, and Spain, to jointly address security challenges in the southern Red Sea and the Gulf of Aden, with the goal of ensuring freedom of navigation for all countries and bolstering regional security and prosperity.”

On October 16, 2024, Austin released a statement about a series of precision strikes conducted earlier that day by U.S. Air Force B-2 bombers against five underground weapons storage locations in Houthi-controlled areas of Yemen.

The next day, October 17, 2024, Austin highlighted three lessons that he views as key to ongoing success against global terrorism while speaking at NATO's D-ISIS Ministerial in Brussels, Belgium. He told the assembled members of the 87-country coalition that continued success against ISIS — and continued successful global counterterrorist efforts, overall — will require vigilance and resoluteness regarding transnational terrorism; an ongoing collective response to terrorist aggression; and understanding the importance of adaptability. "For 10 years, this coalition has tackled the scourge of ISIS. Our success stems from our resolve, our commitment to working together, and our willingness to adapt. These core elements will remain at the heart of the next phase of our mission."

==== Israel ====
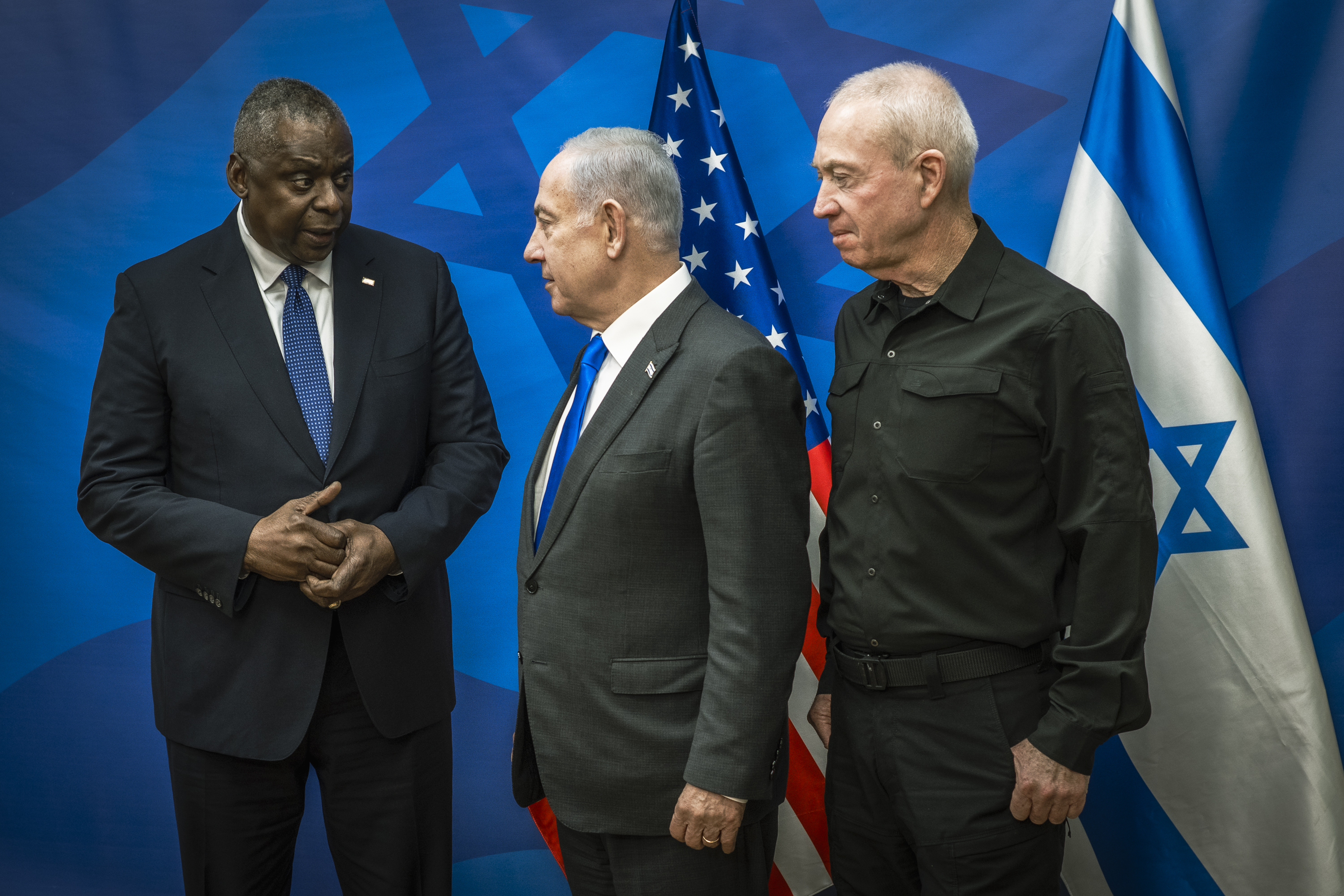
Austin with Israeli prime minister Benjamin Netanyahu and Minister of Defense Yoav Gallant in Tel Aviv, Israel, October 13, 2023

In January 2023, Austin declared that "America's commitment to Israel's security is ironclad. It is not negotiable. And it never will be."

In January 2023, the U.S. and Israel conducted the largest U.S.-Israel partnered exercise in history: Juniper Oak 23.2. The exercise integrated unmanned aerial vehicles, strategic bombers, jet fighters and precision fires. U.S. and Israeli forces conducted long-range strikes, suppression of enemy air defense, electronic attacks, offensive counter and air interdiction, and air operations in the maritime domain. More than 7,000 personnel participated in the all-domain exercise.

On October 8, 2023, the day after the Hamas attack on Israel, Austin directed Gerald R. Ford carrier strike group to the Eastern Mediterranean in response. Along with the carrier, the group also included the cruiser Normandy and the destroyers Ramage, Carney, Roosevelt, and Thomas Hudner. On October 13, 2023, he arrived in Israel and met with Israeli defense minister Yoav Gallant. Austin said: "I am here in person to make something crystal-clear: America's support for Israel is ironclad."

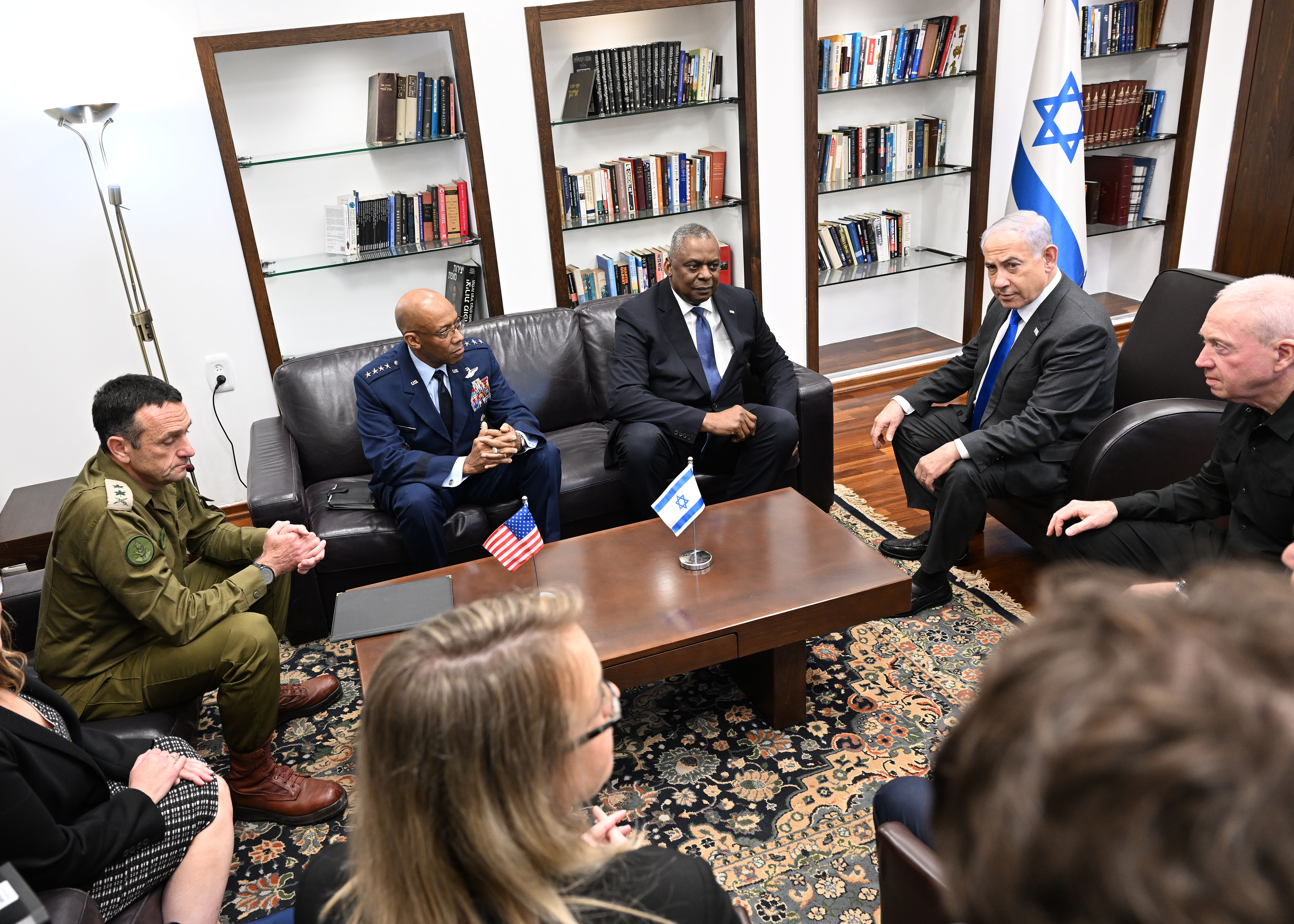
Austin with Israeli prime minister Netanyahu on December 18, 2023

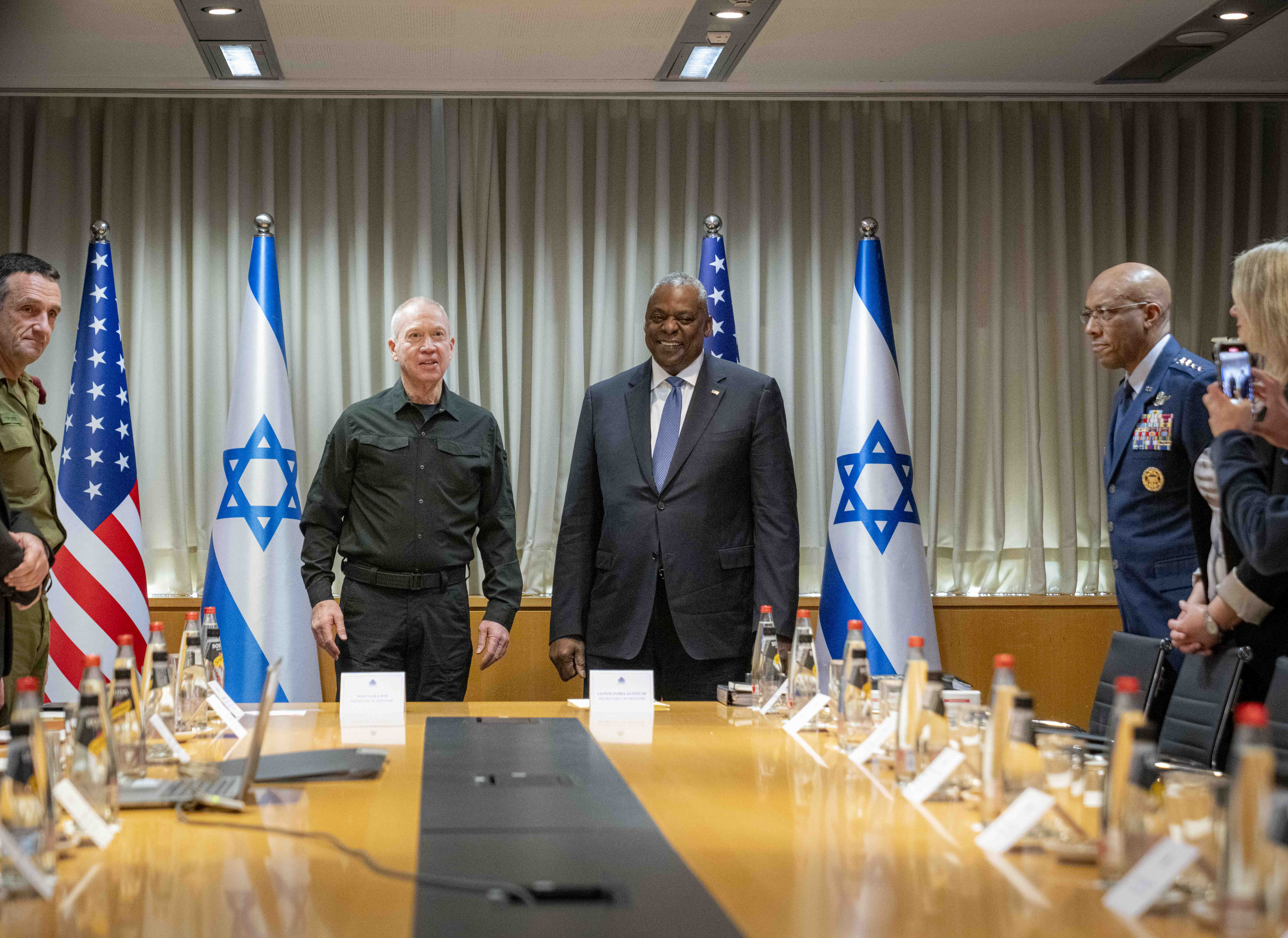
Austin, Israeli defense minister Gallant, Joint Chiefs of Staff chairman Charles Q. Brown Jr. and Israeli chief of general staff Herzi Halevi in Tel Aviv, Israel

Since the initial Hamas attack, Pentagon Spokesman Brig. Gen. Pat Ryder said the department has focused its efforts on protecting American forces and citizens in the region, flowing security assistance to Israel, coordinating with Israelis to secure the release of hostages held by Hamas and strengthening the force posture across the region in order to deter any escalation of the conflict beyond Gaza.

In November 2023, the House approved $14.5 billion in military aid for Israel. The Biden administration announced that it would seek "an unprecedented support package for Israel’s defense” of $14.3 billion."

On November 13, 2023, Defence for Children International, Al-Haq, and Palestinians living in Gaza and the United States, represented by the Center for Constitutional Rights, filed a lawsuit against Austin, President Joe Biden and Secretary of State Antony Blinken for failure to prevent genocide, citing Israel's "mass killings," targeting of schools and hospitals, collective punishment, use of chemical weapons, forced expulsion, and blockage of food, water, electricity and other basic needs.

The court dismissed the case on January 31, 2024, ruling that while "it is plausible that Israel's conduct amounts to genocide," US foreign policy was a political question over which courts lacked jurisdiction.

On November 28, 2023, the U.S. airlifted 24.5 metric tons, or more than 54,000 pounds, of U.N. humanitarian supplies to the people of Gaza. At the request of USAID, these supplies were transported via a U.S. Air Force C-17 Globemaster aircraft to Egypt where they were then transported via ground into Gaza and then distributed by U.N. agencies.

On December 2, 2023, Austin stated that "the United States will remain Israel’s closest friend in the world. Our support for Israel’s security is non-negotiable. And it never will be." In December 2023, the Biden administration bypassed Congress to approve the sale of military equipment to Israel. On December 18, 2023, Austin declared that American support for Israel is "unshakeable".

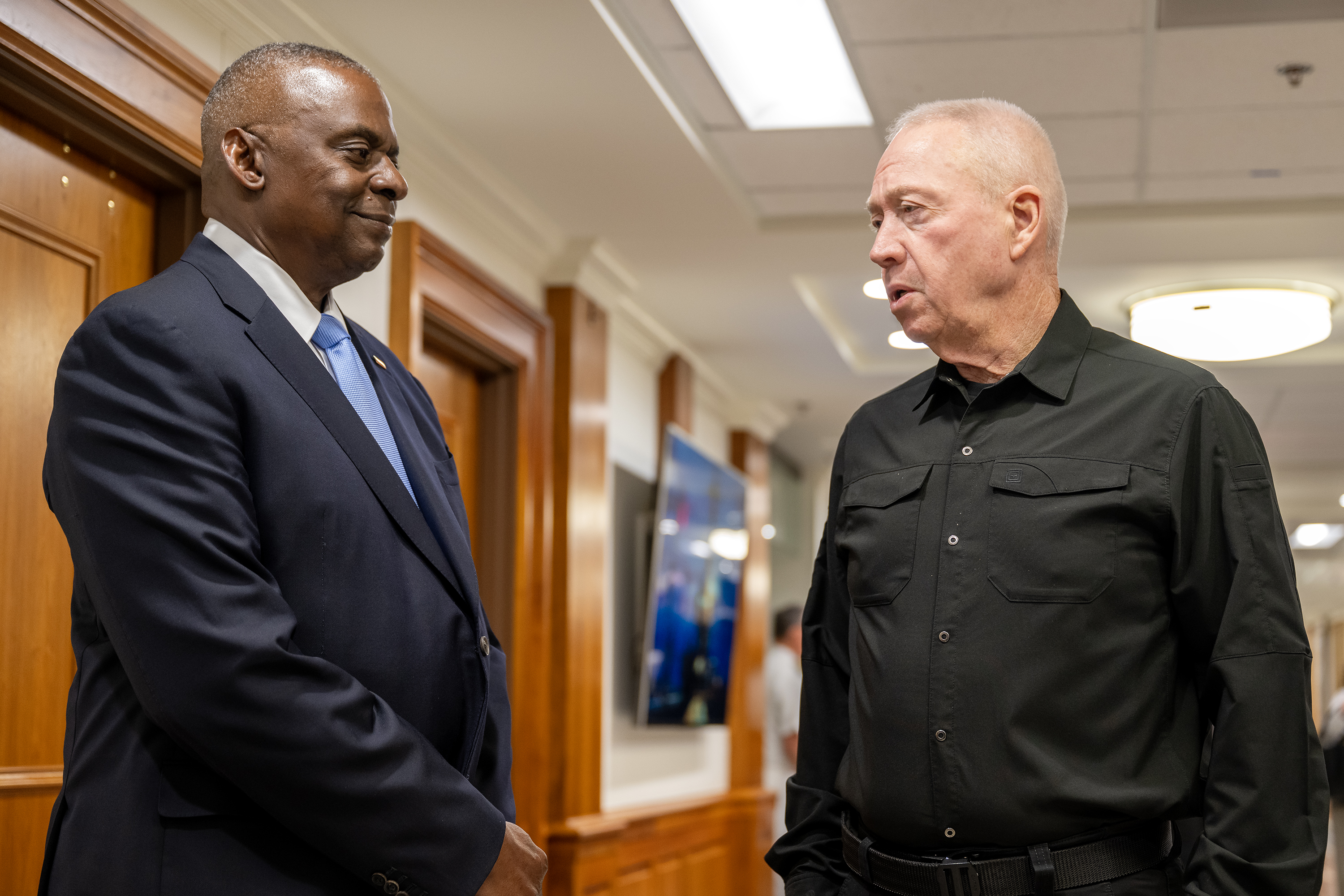
Austin and Israeli defense minister Yoav Gallant at the Pentagon, Washington, D.C., June 25, 2024

On March 5, 2024, Austin met with Israeli War Cabinet member Benny Gantz. In their meeting, Austin condemned Hamas' attack against Israel on October 7 and called for the release of all hostages held by Hamas. He also conveyed strong concerns over the humanitarian situation in Gaza and requested Minister Gantz's support in enabling more humanitarian assistance and distribution into Gaza. Austin emphasized the critical need for a credible and implementable plan for protecting civilians and addressing the humanitarian situation prior to any ground operations in Rafah.

On April 9, 2024, Austin told the Senate Armed Services Committee that the Pentagon had no evidence that Israel was carrying out a genocide against Palestinians in the Gaza Strip. He said there was "no question" that there had been "far too many" civilian casualties in the war in Gaza.

On March 8, 2024, the Defense Department announced plans to undertake an emergency mission to establish a temporary pier on the coast of Gaza to deliver up to 2,000,000 humanitarian aid meals per-day. During a Pentagon press briefing, Pentagon press secretary Maj. Gen. Pat Ryder said, "This is part of a full-court press by the United States to not only focus on working on opening up and expanding routes via land, which are the optimal way to get aid into Gaza, but also by conducting air drops," in reference to the more than 100,000 meals that have been dropped into Gaza by the U.S. and Jordan during the previous week. Between May 17 and the end of June, U.S. Central Command helped deliver about 19.4 million pounds of aid via the temporary pier. It was in use between May and July 2024. The Financial Times estimated less than 600 trucks of aid were delivered via the pier, about two days of aid to Gaza before the war, calling the pier a "colossal failure".

On July 10, 2024, the Biden administration resumed shipments of the 500-pound bombs to Israel, which were halted in May over concerns about the humanitarian impact of Israel's use of them in killing Palestinians in Gaza.

On July 31, 2024, following the assassination of Ismail Haniyeh by Israel, Austin reiterated an "unwavering commitment" to Israel's security and said the United States would come to its defense if needed.

On October 1, 2024, Austin told Israeli defense minister Gallant that the United States supports Israel's ground offensive against Hezbollah in southern Lebanon.

On October 17, 2024, Austin spoke with Israeli minister of defense Yoav Gallant to discuss reports on the killing of Hamas leader Yahya Sinwar, the architect of the terrorist assault on Israel on October 7, 2023, in which 1,200 Israelis and other civilians from more than 30 countries, including the U.S. were murdered and 251 people were taken hostage. Austin also expressed strong support for the immediate release of all remaining hostages and a ceasefire in Gaza. Austin later issued a statement about the killing of Sinwar, stating:

"The killing today of Yahya Sinwar, the leader of the terrorist group Hamas, by Israeli forces is a major achievement in counterterrorism. Sinwar's death will not heal the wounds of the October 7th atrocities that he plotted, or the many deaths for which he is responsible, but I hope that it may bring some small measure of justice and solace to the families and the loved ones of the many victims of Sinwar's premeditated cruelty."

==== Indo-Pacific ====
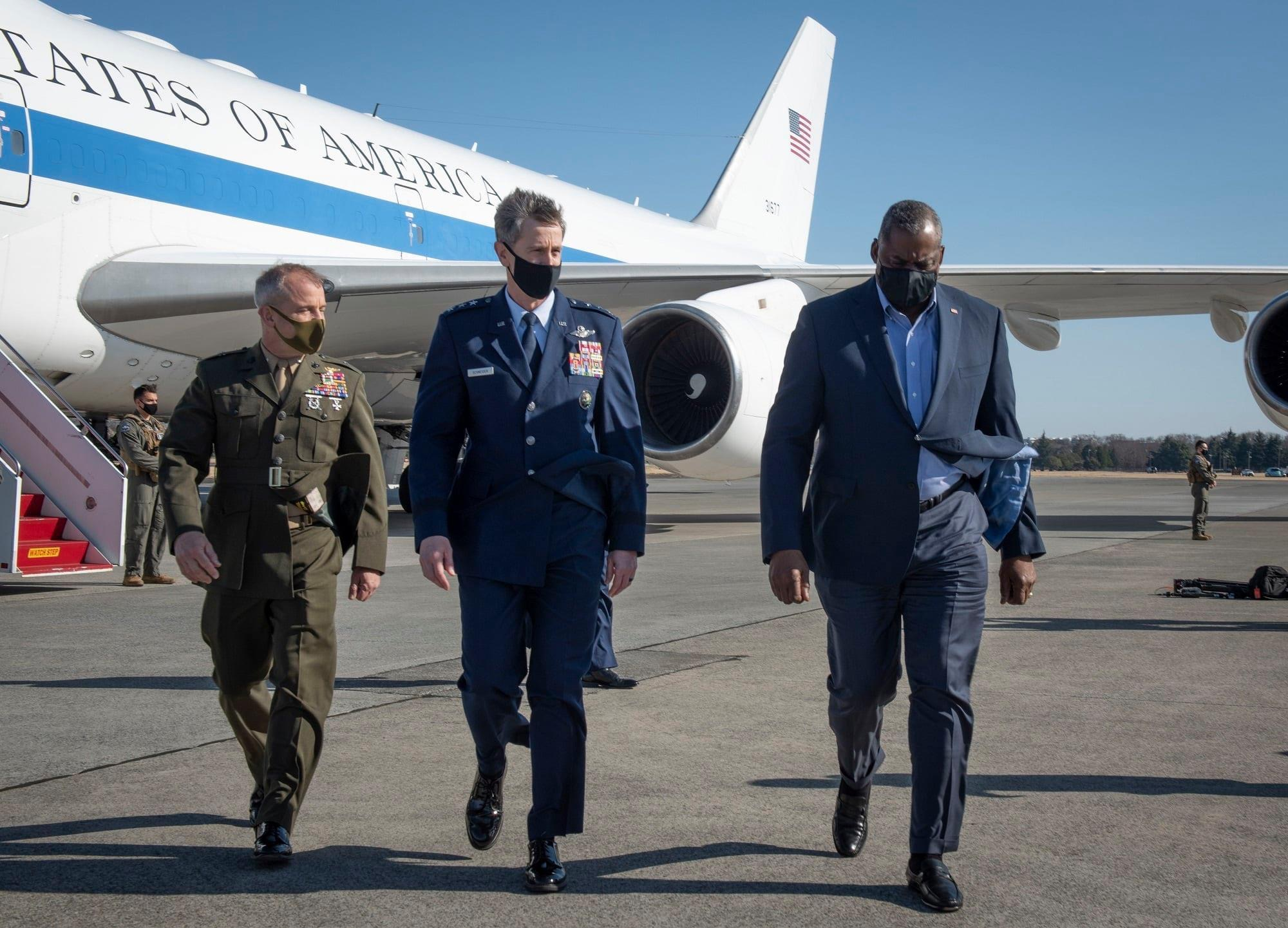
U.S. secretary of defense Lloyd Austin with Commander of U.S. Forces Japan Lt. Gen. Kevin Schneider at Yokota Air Force Base in Japan, March 15, 2021.

In his testimony before the House Armed Services Committee on March 29, 2023, Austin said:

The PRC is our pacing challenge. And we're driving hard to meet it. Our budget builds on our previous investments to deter aggression. We're investing in a more resilient force posture in the Indo-Pacific and increasing the scale and the scope of our exercises with our partners. And in recent months, our friends in the Indo-Pacific have taken major steps forward. The Philippines has agreed to nearly double the number of sites where we cooperate together. Japan has committed to double its defense spending. And through the historic AUKUS partnership, we'll work with our Australian and British allies to build game-changing defense advantages that will deter aggression and boost our defense industrial capacity.

During his tenure as Secretary of Defense, Austin made thirteen official visits to the Indo-Pacific region. His 13th trip in December 2024 was to Japan where he engaged with U.S. troops and Japanese leaders. His previous trip in November 2024 included stops in Australia, the Philippines, Laos, and Fiji, where Austin participated in the Australia-U.S.-Japan Trilateral Defense Ministers' Meeting, attended the ASEAN Defense Ministers' Meeting Plus, conducted meetings with regional counterparts, and held engagements with Fijian leaders.

In March 2021, as part of their first overseas trip as members of the Biden administration, Austin and Secretary of State Antony Blinken visited Japan and South Korea. The trip reflected the Biden administration's concerns about China's growing influence within the Indo-Pacific region, especially their military buildup during the pandemic, as well as North Korea's nuclear threat and the February 2021 coup d'état in Myanmar. The trip was also part of the Biden administration's "America is back" diplomatic theme, and Austin pledged the U.S.'s commitment to reaffirm ties with its allies and to maintain a robust military presence in the Indo-Pacific region. Austin added that denuclearization of the Korean Peninsula remains a top priority for the Biden Administration, and that the alliances with South Korea and Japan are among the most important tools the United States has in that regard.

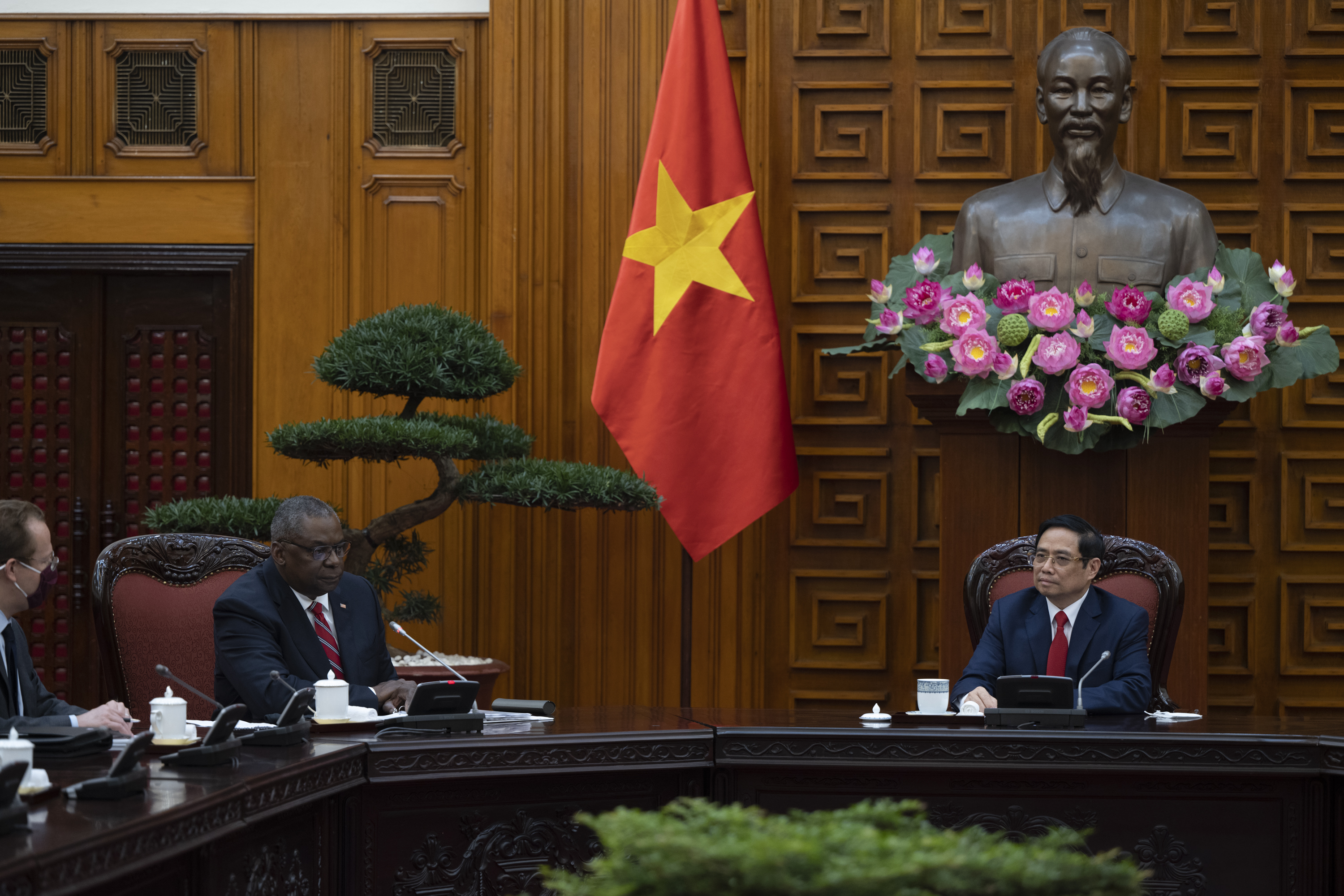
Austin meets with Vietnam's prime minister Pham Minh Chinh in Hanoi, Vietnam, July 29, 2021.

On March 16, 2021, the Japan-U.S. Security Consultative Committee (SCC) (Japan-U.S. "2+2") was convened in Tokyo. The meeting was attended by Austin and Blinken from the U.S. side, and Foreign Minister Motegi Toshimitsu and Defense Minister Kishi Nobuo from the Japanese side. The four ministers reaffirmed that the Japan-U.S. Alliance remains the "cornerstone" of peace, security, and prosperity in the Indo-Pacific region, and renewed the unwavering commitment of both countries to the Japan-U.S. Alliance.

In June 2023, as part of his seventh official visit to the Indo-Pacific region, Austin traveled to Tokyo to meet with his Japanese counterpart, Defense Minister Yasukazu Hamada and other senior leaders, including Prime Minister Kishida Fumio and Foreign Minister Yoshimasa Hayashi. Austin's visit came as the United States and Japan took important strides to modernize Alliance capabilities, optimize U.S. force posture, and build links with like-minded partners following the historic U.S.-Japan "2+2" Ministerial meeting earlier that year.

In July 2023, Austin traveled to Australia where he participated in the 33rd Australia/U.S. ministerial consultations, also called AUSMIN. Following the meeting, DoD officials stated, "the unbreakable alliance between the United States and Australia has never been stronger" and "it is doing more than ever for peace and stability in the Indo-Pacific."

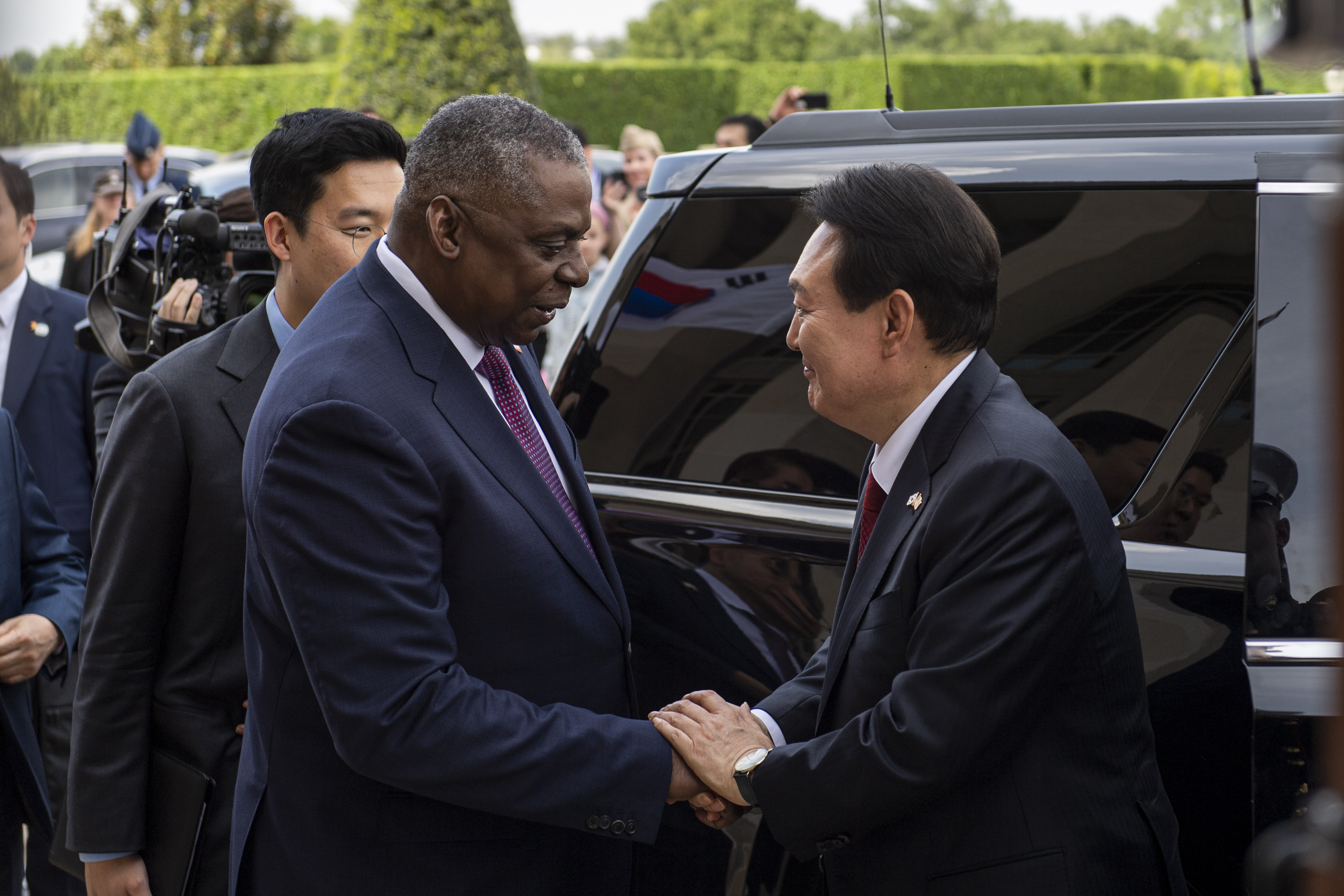
Austin with South Korean president Yoon Suk Yeol at the Pentagon in Washington, D.C., April 27, 2023

In July 2024, Austin made his eleventh official visit to the Indo-Pacific region where he conducted a series of engagements with counterparts and other senior officials in Japan and the Philippines. While in Tokyo, Austin and Secretary of State Antony Blinken met with Japanese minister of defense Kihara Minoru and Japanese Minister for Foreign Affairs Kamikawa Yoko for the 2024 U.S.-Japan Security Consultative Committee — or "2+2" — meeting. Following the 2+2 meeting, the four officials announced historic steps to modernize Alliance roles, missions, and capabilities; expand defense industry cooperation; and enhance alignment with allies and partners. The four ministers also convened a historic ministerial meeting on Extended Deterrence. In addition to holding bilateral meetings with Minister Kihara and Minister Shin, Austin and Blinken also met with Japanese prime minister Kishida Fumio.

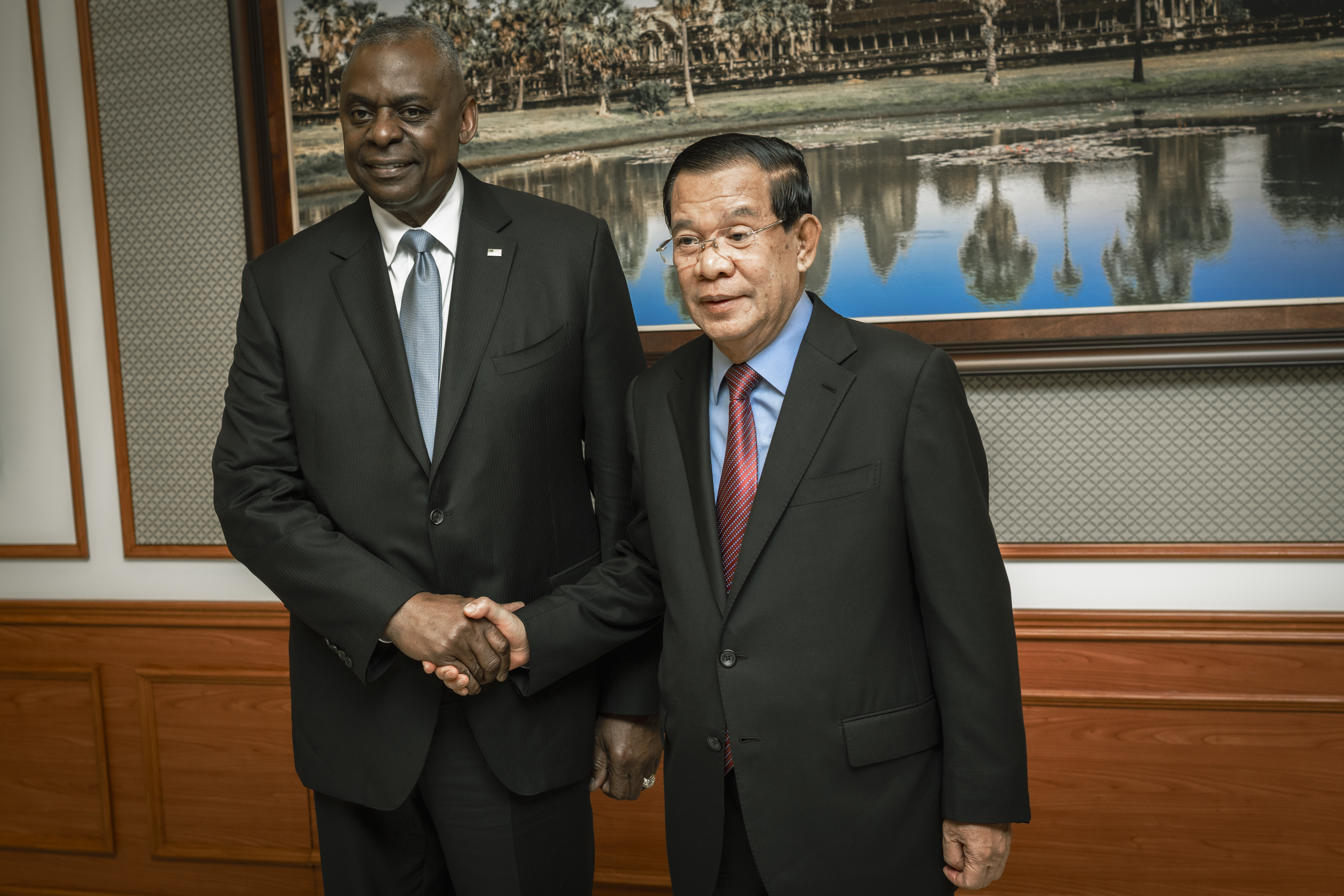
Austin with Cambodia's Senate president Hun Sen in Phnom Penh, June 4, 2024

Also while in Tokyo, Austin, Minister Kihara, and Republic of Korea (ROK) minister of national defense Shin Won-sik held the first Trilateral Ministerial Meeting to ever take place in either Japan or the ROK, where they signed a Memorandum of Cooperation on the Trilateral Security Cooperation Framework to further institutionalize their three countries' security partnership.

During their subsequent visit to the Philippines, Austin and Blinken met with Philippine president Bongbong Marcos during which they underscored the historic strength of the U.S.–Philippines Alliance, reaffirmed ironclad U.S. support for the Philippines in defending its sovereign rights, and discussed ways to continue working more closely with like-minded nations in the Indo-Pacific region. Austin and Blinken also joined their Philippine counterparts, Secretary of National Defense Gilberto Teodoro and Secretary of Foreign Affairs Enrique Manalo, for the fourth U.S.-Philippines 2+2 Ministerial Dialogue – the first to ever take place in Manila. Together, the four officials discussed opportunities to strengthen regional peace, stability, and prosperity in the face of shared challenges. In a separate bilateral meeting with Secretary Teodoro, Austin welcomed the historic announcements from the 2+2 Ministerial Dialogue on Foreign Military Financing for the Philippines and the conclusion of a Security Sector Assistance Roadmap.

In November 2024, Austin again met with President Marcos and Secretary Teodoro in the Philippines. Together they reaffirmed the strength of the U.S.-Philippines alliance as well as their shared vision for a free and open Indo-Pacific. While there, Austin participated in a groundbreaking ceremony for a new bilateral Combined Coordination Center and signed a General Security of Military Information Agreement, both of which will increase information flow and deepen interoperability.

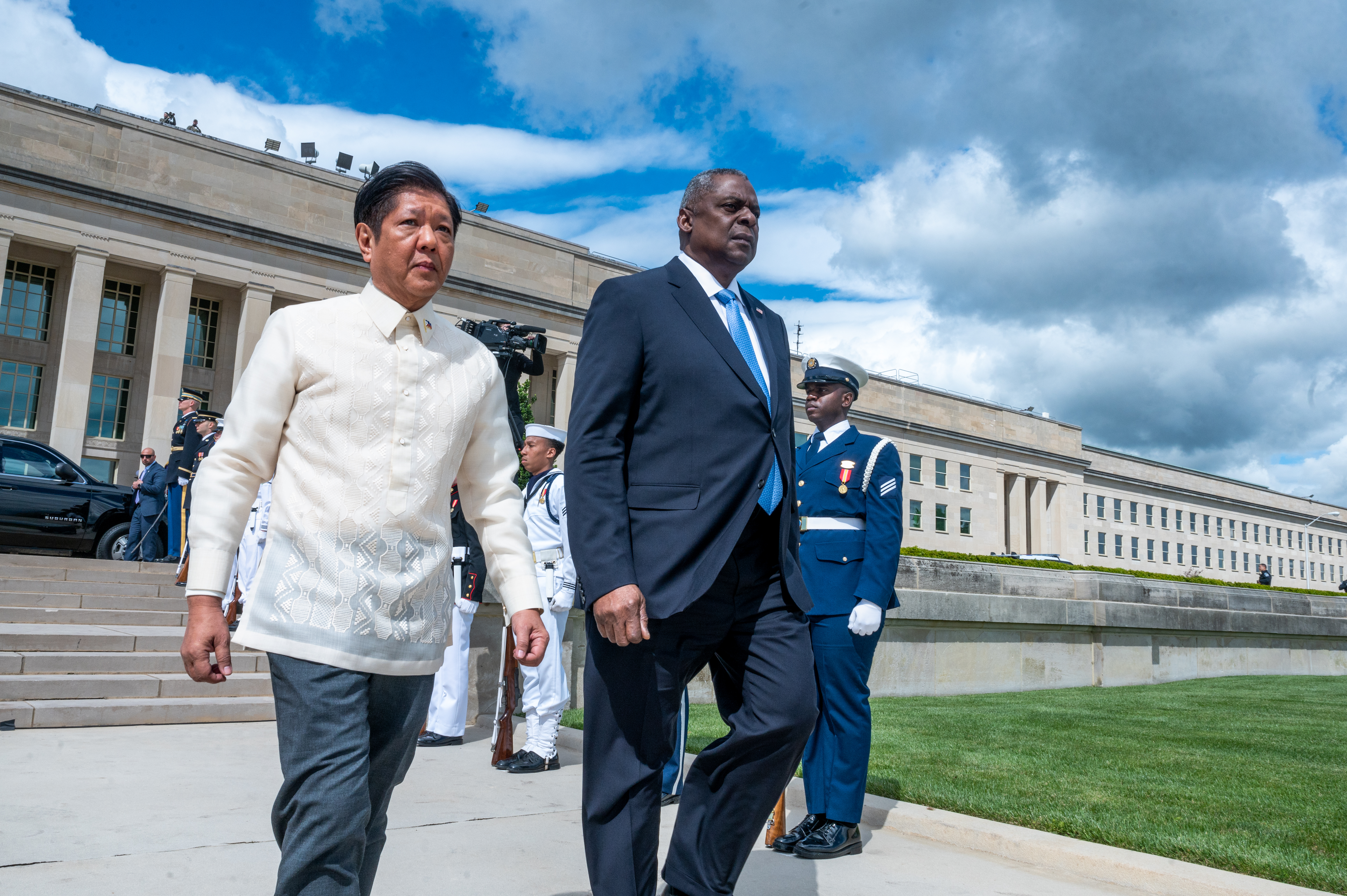
Austin with Philippine President Bongbong Marcos at the Pentagon, May 3, 2023

In March 2021, Austin made a three-day visit to India, where he met with his Indian counterpart Rajnath Singh, and other senior government officials. India drew closer to the United States following its tensions with China on their disputed Sino-Indian border. Austin urged India to cancel the planned purchase of Russia's S-400 air defence system.

Austin made a second visit to India in June 2023, where he again met with Defense Minister Rajnath Singh as well as other senior leaders to discuss the ongoing joint efforts to modernize the U.S.–India Major Defense Partnership.

In November 2024, Austin met with Indian defense minister Singh in Laos.

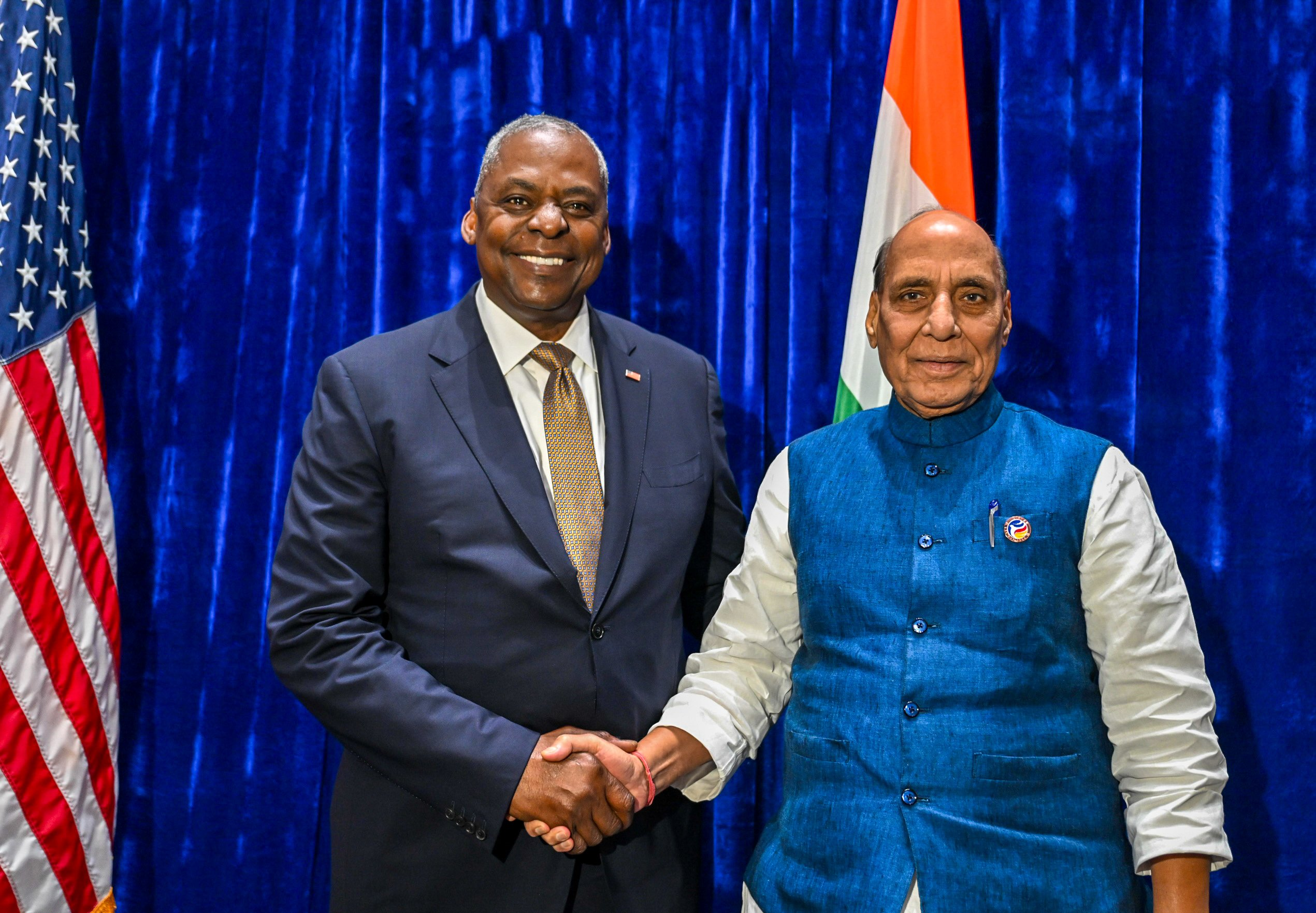
Austin met with Indian defense minister Rajnath Singh in Laos in November 2024

The India-U.S. defense partnership has strengthened considerably in the last few years with the countries signing key defense and security pacts, including the Logistics Exchange Memorandum of Agreement in 2016 that allows their militaries to use each other's bases for repair and replenishment of supplies.

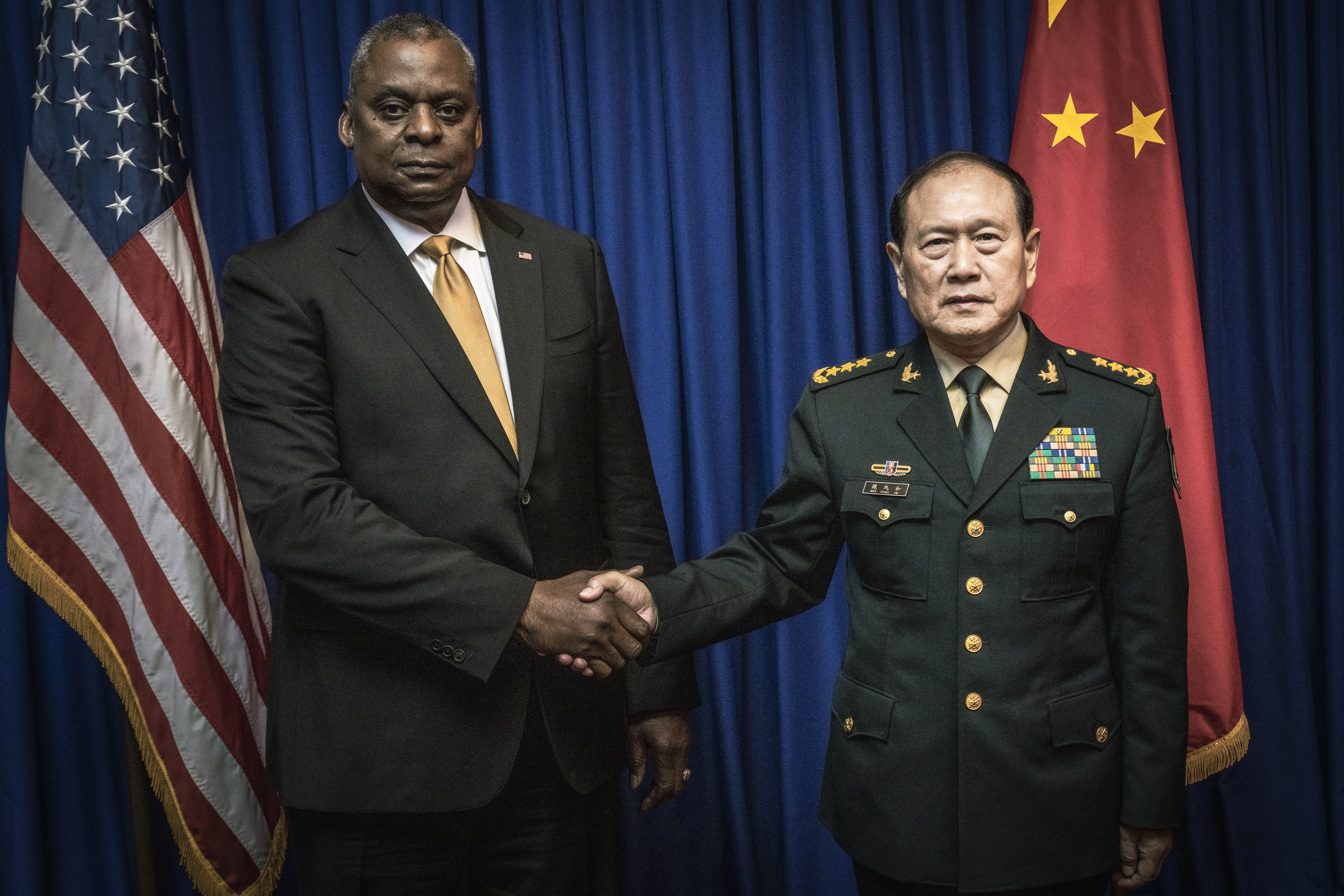
Austin with Chinese state councilor and defense minister Wei Fenghe, November 22, 2022

During a press conference following Austin's visit to New Delhi, a senior Defense Department official described the progress between the U.S. and India: "India's growing commitment to playing a more engaged international role, including in the Indo-Pacific Quad, demonstrates a new and growing willingness to join the United States to protect and advance a shared vision of a free, open and rules-based global order.

On June 11, 2022, Austin condemned China's "provocative, destabilising" military activity near Taiwan, a day after China's defence minister Wei Fenghe warned Austin that "if anyone dares to split Taiwan from China, the Chinese army will definitely not hesitate to start a war no matter the cost." Austin said the United States "will continue to fulfill our commitments under the Taiwan Relations Act. That includes assisting Taiwan in maintaining a sufficient self-defense capability." By February 2023, he had secured the U.S. military access to nine military bases in the Philippines, which is orthogonally situated between Taiwan and the South China Sea, expediting the full implementation of the Enhanced Defense Cooperation Agreement signed during the Obama administration. At the June 2023 Shangri-La Dialogue in Singapore, Austin warned that conflict in the Taiwan Strait would be devastating.

On April 16, 2024, Austin spoke on the phone with Admiral Dong Jun, Minister of National Defense of the People's Republic of China (PRC). It was the first time Austin had talked to Dong and the first time Austin had spoken at length with any Chinese counterpart since November 2022. On May 31, 2024, Austin and Dong met in Singapore on the margins of the Shangri-La Dialogue, ending an almost 18-month break since the two countries’ top defense officials last spoke in person. During their meeting, Austin expressed concern about recent provocative PLA activity around the Taiwan Strait, and he reiterated that the PRC should not use Taiwan's political transition — part of a normal, routine democratic process — as a pretext for coercive measures. Austin underscored that the US remains committed to its longstanding one China policy, and also reaffirmed the importance of peace and stability across the Taiwan Strait.

In November 2023, Austin traveled to Jakarta, Indonesia for the ASEAN Defense Ministers' Meeting (ADMM) Plus where he emphasized the U.S. commitment to ASEAN centrality as a key pillar of the United States’ efforts to uphold a free and open Indo-Pacific and detailed how U.S. security cooperation with ASEAN partners is contributing to a more stable and prosperous region. On the margins of the ADMM-Plus, Austin also met with each of his ASEAN counterparts from the Philippines, Indonesia, Thailand, and Vietnam.

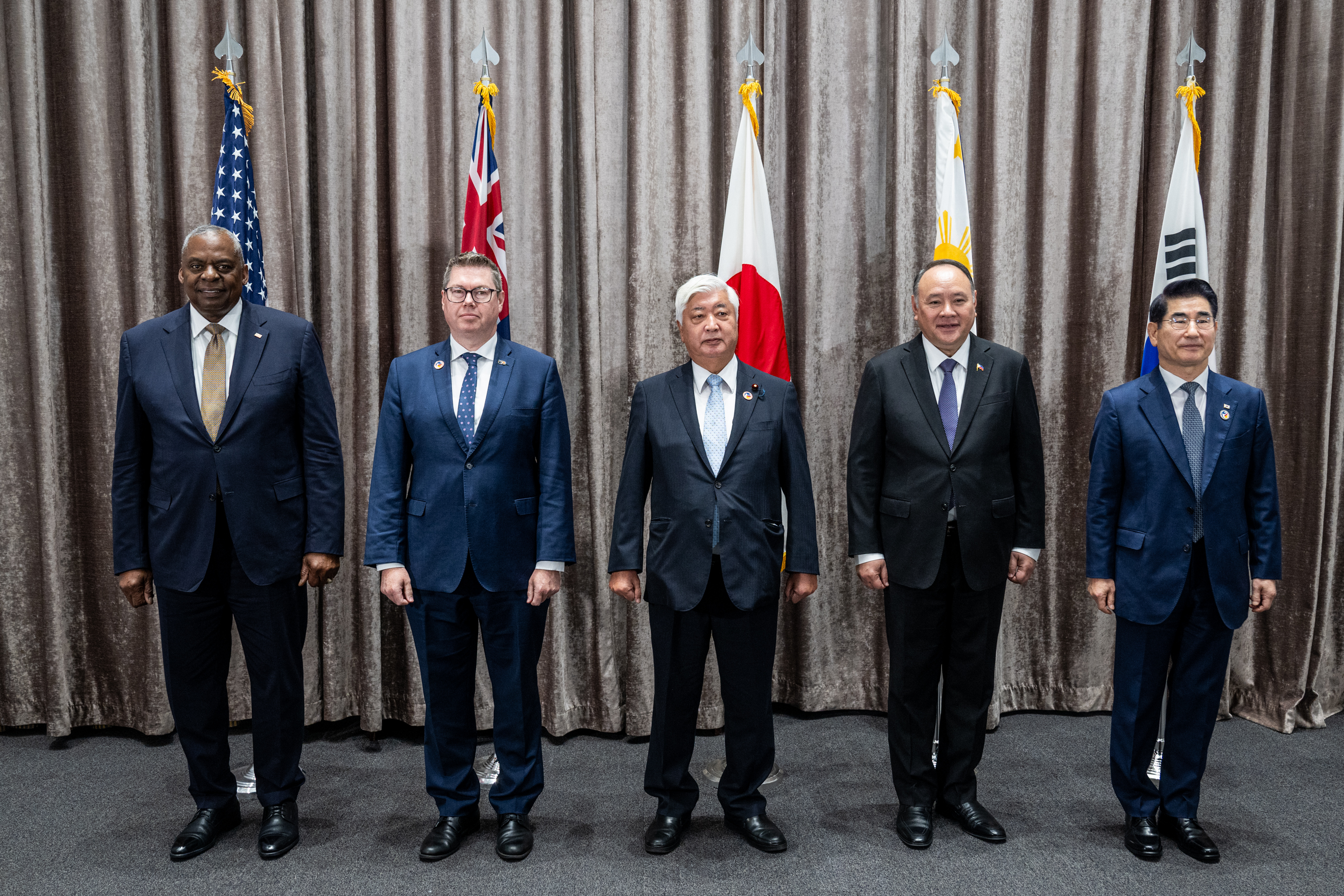
Austin met with his counterparts from Australia, Japan, the Philippines, and the Republic of Korea for a historic multilateral meeting in Laos on November 21, 2024

A year later, in November 2024, Austin traveled to Laos where he participated in the ADMM-Plus and met with regional counterparts. He delivered plenary remarks and announced the first-ever DoD Vision Statement for a Prosperous and Secure Southeast Asia that details ways to increase practical cooperation between the United States and Southeast Asia. He also announced the second-ever ASEAN-United States Maritime Exercise in 2025 to advance maritime safety and rule of law in the region. During his meetings, Austin emphasized the U.S. commitment to strengthen security in Southeast Asia through unwavering support for ASEAN centrality. On the margins of ADMM Plus, Austin convened the first-ever meeting with defense leaders from Australia, Japan, the Philippines, and the Republic of Korea to discuss their shared commitment to advance a free and open Indo-Pacific, where international law and sovereignty are respected.

AUKUS Partnership

The trilateral security partnership among the U.S., United Kingdom and Australia, also known as AUKUS, was created in September 2021 with the goal to "strengthen the ability of each government to support security and defense interests, building on longstanding and ongoing bilateral ties. [The partnership] will promote deeper information sharing and technology sharing; and foster deeper integration of security and defense-related science, technology, industrial bases and supply chains."

The AUKUS partnership has two pillars. The first is to enable Australia's acquisition of conventionally armed, nuclear-powered submarine capability as rapidly as possible, most likely in the early 2030s. The second pillar is to accelerate emerging capabilities, including uncrewed maritime systems, artificial intelligence, autonomy, electronic warfare, quantum, cyber and hypersonics.

On September 26, 2024, during a joint press conference with his Australian and UK counterparts, Defense Minister Richard Marles and Defense Secretary Josh Healey, following the AUKUS Defense Ministerial Meeting in London, Austin said: "Together, we have reaffirmed the extraordinary strength of our AUKUS partnership and we showed our shared vision for an open, free, secure, and prosperous Indo-Pacific. Our three proud democracies share a deep and binding belief in the rules based international order and in a system that respects human rights upholds the rule of law and insists that disputes be resolved peacefully. We also understand that we are stronger together, and that's the lens that we all used again today."

At the AUKUS Defence Ministers’ Meeting in California on December 1, 2023, it was announced that AUKUS partners would launch the Innovation Challenge Series in the first half of 2024. The AUKUS Innovation Challenge Series was created to enable governments, industry, and academia to co-design solutions to operational problems. The first AUKUS Innovation Challenge was drawn from a trilaterally agreed problem set that the partner defense forces face and focused on electronic warfare. On September 26, 2024, Austin, Marles and Healey each announced the winners from their respective nations at the Defence Ministers Meeting at the Old Royal Naval College in Greenwich, London.

In a statement issued on September 15, 2023, marking the second anniversary of the establishment of AUKUS, Austin said: "I am incredibly proud of the tireless work of this department and our U.K. and Australian counterparts, and I am confident in the bright future of our historic partnership. Working together over these past two years, we have accelerated efforts toward our common goals faster than anyone would have thought possible."

During his November 2024 visit to Australia, Austin met with Australian deputy prime minister Richard Marles and Japanese minister of defense Nakatani Gen for a historic Trilateral Defense Ministers' Meeting where they announced initiatives to expand the scale and scope of trilateral cooperation and enhance force posture in the region.

==== Afghanistan ====
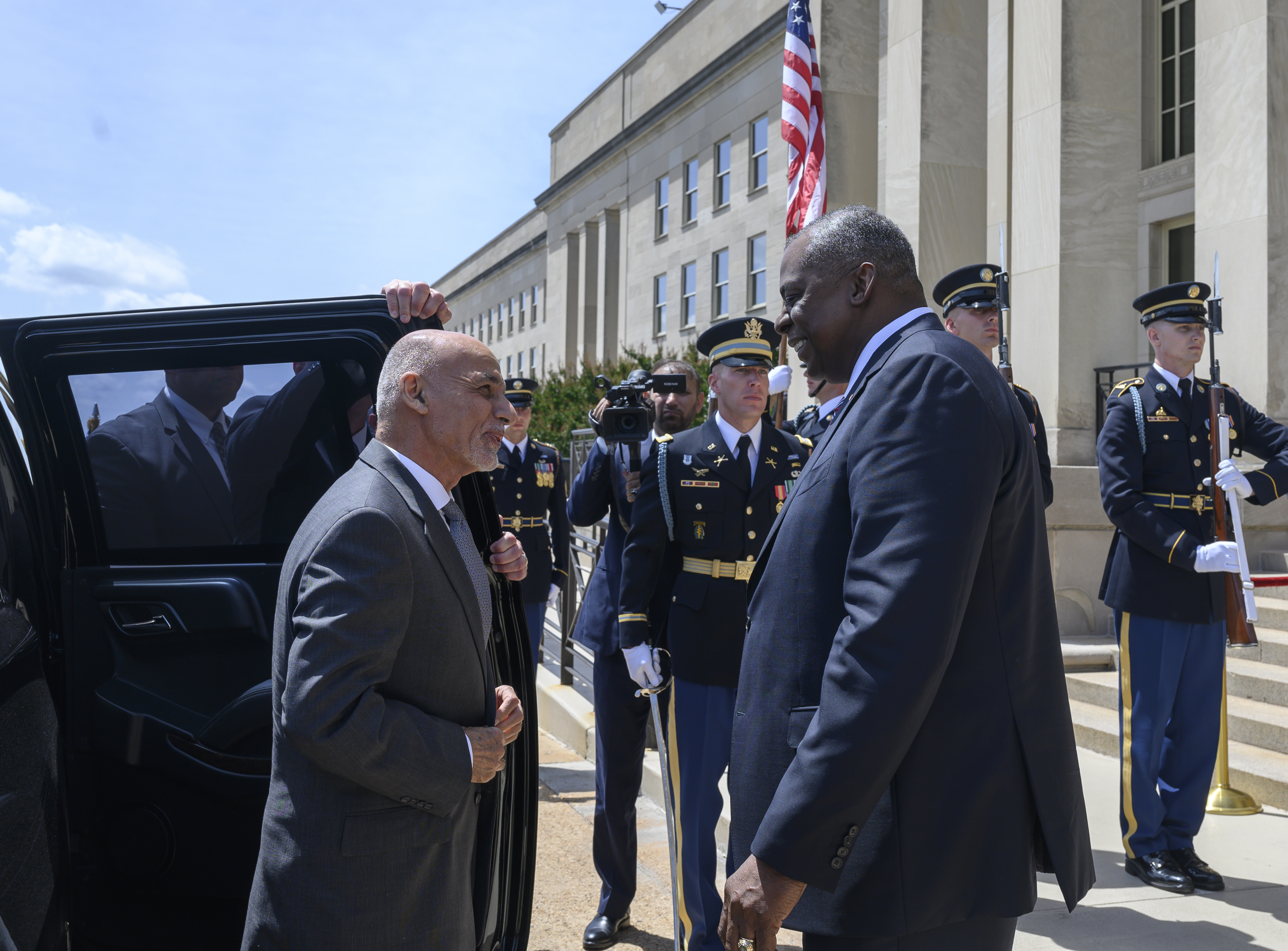
Austin meeting with Afghan president Ashraf Ghani on June 25, 2021

On February 19, 2021, Austin told reporters at the Pentagon that the Biden administration had not yet determined whether the U.S. would withdraw all troops from Afghanistan by the May 1 deadline set by the Trump administration in February 2020 as part of the Doha Agreement, a deal reached between the United States and the Taliban. The Biden administration was considering a six-month extension. On March 21, 2021, Austin met with Afghanistan president Ashraf Ghani in Kabul.

That same month, Biden directed his national security team, including Austin, to begin withdrawal planning that accounted for a range of possible contingencies, including a non-combatant evacuation operation (NEO). On April 14, 2021, in an address to the nation, President Biden announced that a new deadline for full withdrawal of all U.S. troops had been set for September 11, 2021. "After consulting closely with our allies and partners, with our military leaders and intelligence personnel, with our diplomats and our development experts, with the Congress and the Vice President, as well as with [Afghan president Ashraf Ghani] and many others around the world, I concluded that it's time to end America's longest war. It's time for American troops to come home," he said.

Soon after the withdrawal of U.S. troops started, the Taliban launched an offensive against the Afghan government, quickly advancing in front of a collapsing Afghan Armed Forces. On July 24, 2021, Austin said: "In terms of whether or not [Afghanistan's military] will stop the Taliban, I think the first thing to do is to make sure that they can slow the momentum."

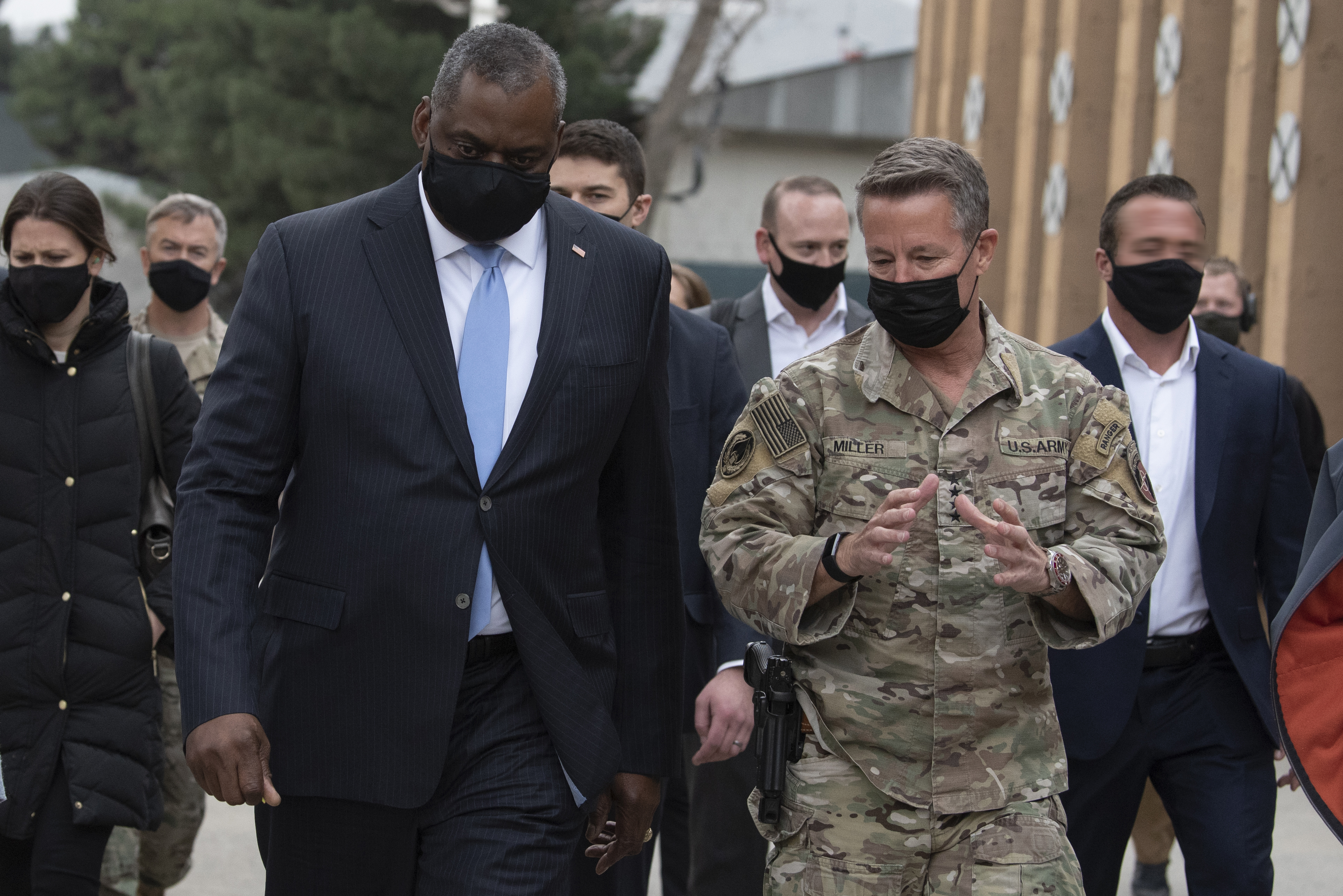
Austin with NATO's Resolute Support Mission commander Austin S. Miller in Kabul, Afghanistan, March 21, 2021

On August 12, 2021, following continued Taliban victories across Afghanistan, the Biden administration announced that 3,000 U.S. troops would be deployed to Kabul Airport to evacuate embassy personnel, US nationals and Special Immigrant Visa applicants. Over the next few weeks, the Defense Department oversaw one of the largest airlifts in history, evacuating more than 120,000 Americans, Afghans and people of other nationalities. On August 26, 2021, an ISIS-K terrorist detonated a suicide bomb at Hamid Karzai International Airport, killing more than 170 civilians and 13 US service members. In a statement issued on the one-year anniversary of that devastating attack at Abbey Gate, Austin said: "The heroes we lost that day gave their lives to defend their teammates and to help save the lives of tens of thousands of innocent Afghan people who sought freedom and the opportunity for a better life." On August 30, 2021, the last American service member left Afghanistan.

In December 2021, Austin directed an independent After Action Review (AAR) be conducted to provide a detailed assessment of the Defense Department's implementation of US Afghanistan policy from January 2020 through August 2021. "The purpose of the AAR was to examine decision points, constraints, and assumptions in order to contribute toward a whole-of-government effort to learn, improve and incorporate lessons learned into the Department's response to future crises."

==== Ukraine ====
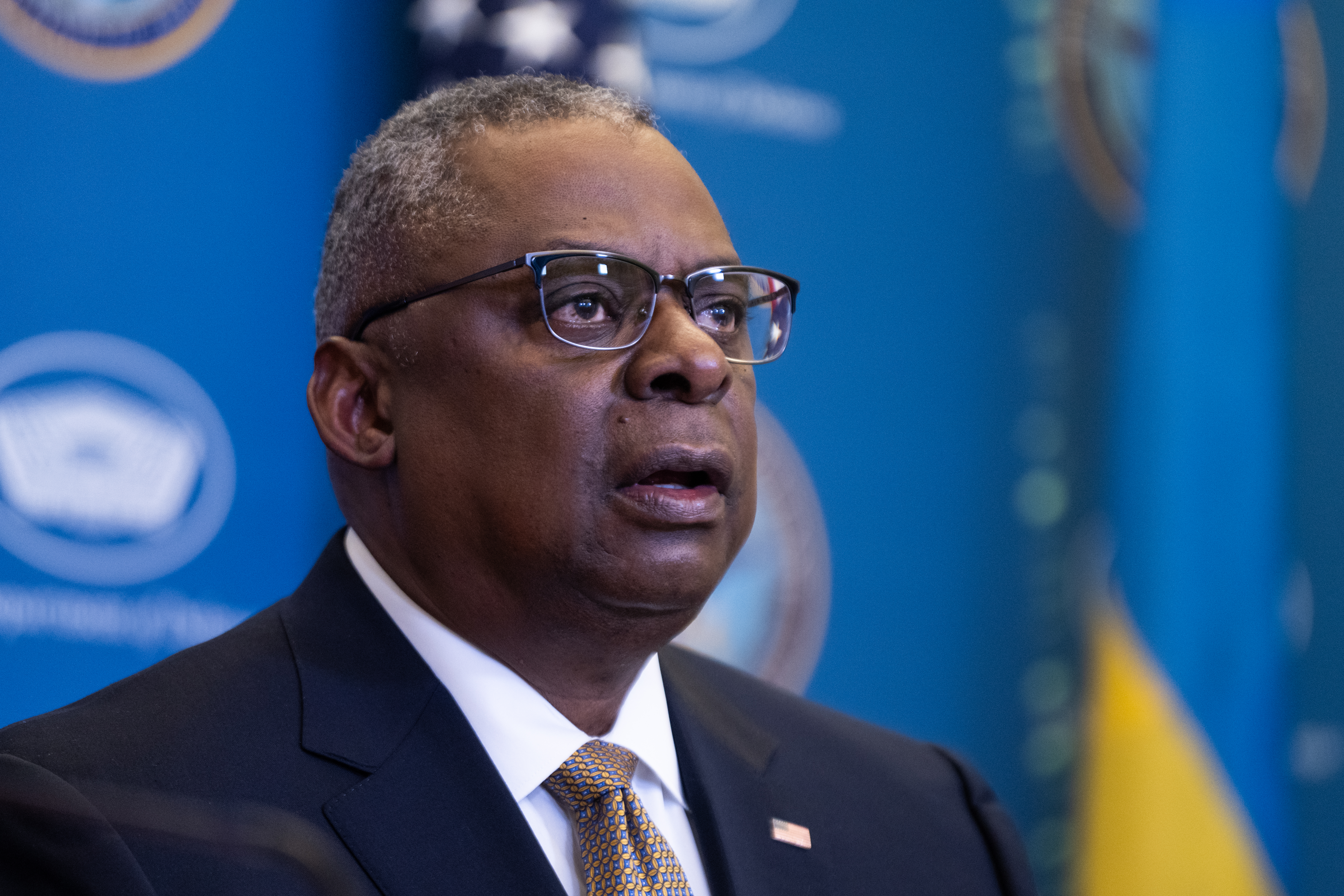
Austin refused to cooperate with the International Criminal Court (ICC) investigating Russian war crimes in Ukraine, stating "I will always prioritize the protection of US military personnel in anything that we do."

On February 24, 2022, Russian president Vladimir Putin launched an invasion of Ukraine, stating the "special military operation" is aimed at "demilitarization" and "denazification" of the country to protect ethnic Russians, prevent Kyiv's NATO membership and to keep it in Russia's "sphere of influence". During the invasion, the U.S. sent tens of billions of dollars in missiles, ammunition and other items to Ukraine. Austin said that he wanted to see "Russia weakened to the degree that it can't do the kinds of things that it has done in invading Ukraine".

Austin immediately ordered deployment of 7,000 U.S. military personnel and key enablers to locations across Europe in support of Ukraine. The next day, the NATO Response Force was activated, and the Biden administration authorized $350 million in military assistance from Defense Department inventories, including anti-armor, small arms and various munitions, body armor, and related equipment.

In March 2022, the Biden administration announced $1 billion in security assistance to Ukraine, including direct transfers of Defense Department equipment to the Ukrainian military. In total, as of September 26, 2024, the United States has committed more than $59.8 billion in security assistance to Ukraine since the beginning of the Biden Administration, including approximately $59.1 billion through both presidential drawdown authority and the Ukraine Security Assistance Initiative since the Russian invasion of Ukraine on February 24, 2022.

On April 24, 2022, Secretary Austin and Secretary of State Antony Blinken visited Kyiv, Ukraine, and met with President Volodymyr Zelenskyy and other Ukrainian leaders. They discussed America's stalwart support for the Ukrainian government and Ukrainian people, including through the U.S.'s significant assistance to Ukraine's security, governance, economic and humanitarian needs.

On April 26, 2022, Austin hosted a forum at Ramstein Air Base, Germany, referred to as the Ukraine Defense Contact Group (UDCG) (also known as the Ramstein Group), where nearly 40 nations met to discuss current and future efforts to provide support for Ukraine. In his opening comments he articulated the purpose of the gathering, "to help Ukraine win the fight against Russia's unjust invasion—and to build up Ukraine's defenses for tomorrow's challenges". Austin also made clear that the invasion of Ukraine was a "war of choice". "Nobody is fooled by Putin's pretexts or by his phony claims on the Donbas [region]", Austin said. "Let's be clear — Russia's invasion is indefensible, and so are Russian atrocities. We all start today from a position of moral clarity: Russia is waging a war of choice to indulge the ambitions of one man."

"Russia's invasion is baseless, reckless and lawless," Austin said.

It is an affront to the rules-based international order. It is a challenge to free people everywhere. And, as we see this morning, nations of goodwill from around the world stand united in our resolve to support Ukraine in its fight against Russia's imperial aggression. And that's the way it should be...The contact group will be a vehicle for nations of goodwill to intensify our efforts, coordinate our assistance, and focus on winning today's fight and the struggles to come. The monthly meetings may be in-person, virtual or mixed. And they'll extend the transparency, the integration, and the dialogue that we saw today.

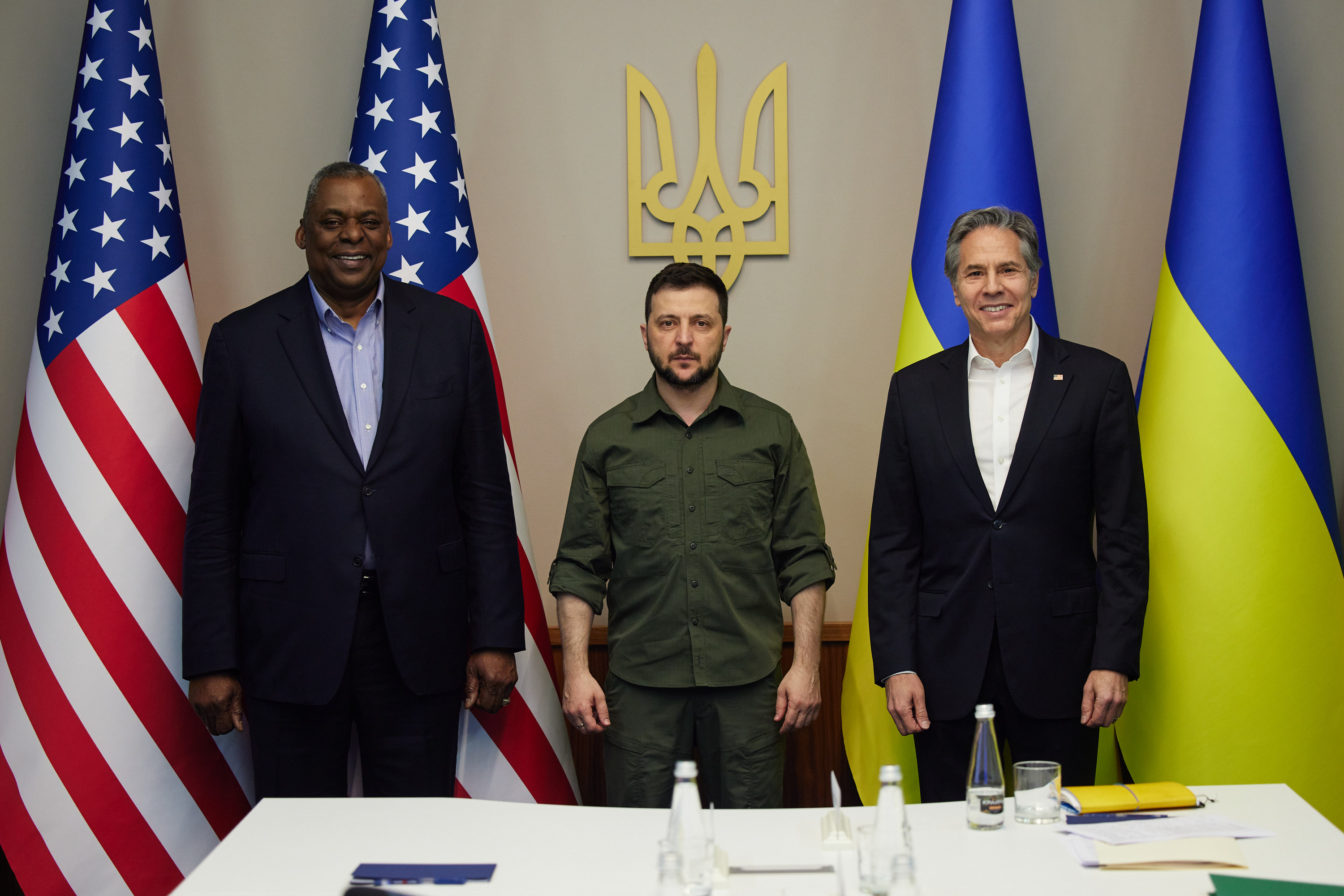
Austin and Secretary of State Antony Blinken meeting with Ukrainian president Volodymyr Zelenskyy in Kyiv on April 24, 2022

On January 20, 2023, Austin traveled to Ramstein Air Base, Germany, to conduct the eighth such meeting of the Ukraine Defense Contact Group. He was joined by ministers of defense and chiefs of defense from nearly 50 nations, including Ukrainian defense minister Oleksiy Reznikov. The meeting produced an unprecedented level of donations from allies and partners, including the procurement of 31 M1 Abrams tanks for Ukraine by the U.S. as part of a $400 million Ukraine Security Assistance Initiative package. On May 15, 2023, the Defense Department announced the arrival of the Abrams tanks to Grafenwoehr, Germany in preparation for U.S.-led training of Ukrainian tank crews and maintainers before the tanks are sent to the front lines to arm Ukrainian forces.

Austin refused to cooperate with the International Criminal Court (ICC) investigating Russian war crimes in Ukraine, consistent with long-standing policy that it might legitimize the ICC's investigation of United States war crimes. During a May 2023 Senate Appropriations Subcommittee on Defense hearing about the Department of Defense's (DoD) fiscal year 2024 budget request, Senator Dick Durbin asked Austin: "Why are you reluctant to share [with the International Criminal Court] the evidence that we have gathered in the United States through the Department of Defense for those who are holding [Russian president] Vladimir Putin accountable for his war crimes?" Austin responded, "The Department firmly supports the goal of holding Russia accountable for its violations in Ukraine." But he added, "I will always prioritize the protection of US military personnel in anything that we do." When Durbin pushed him for further clarification, Austin said, "Again, I do have concerns about reciprocity [against U.S. military personnel] going forward."

On May 25, 2023, Austin hosted the 12th meeting of the UDCG, held virtually and attended by leaders from 50 countries. Austin told those gathered, "Today, we committed to doing even more to support Ukraine's fight for freedom. I came away from today's meeting as confident as ever in the contact group's resolve and sustained unity."

On June 15, 2023, Austin delivered remarks at the 13th meeting of the UDCG, marking the United States' new package of more than $2 billion under the Ukraine Security Assistance Initiative. On July 17, 2023, he spoke at the 14th meeting of the UDCG, noting that "Russia's war of choice has now lasted more than 500 days. On September 19, 2023, at the 15th meeting of the UDCG, Austin said:

Back in June, President Biden joined the leaders of the G7 in a joint declaration condemning, and I quote, "Russia's illegal, unjustifiable and unprovoked war of aggression against Ukraine. Those leaders committed to working together with Ukraine on long-term bilateral security commitments and arrangements to help secure its future. Since June, more than 22 countries have signed on to this statement and they've started working to further deepen their support for Ukraine now and in the years to come.

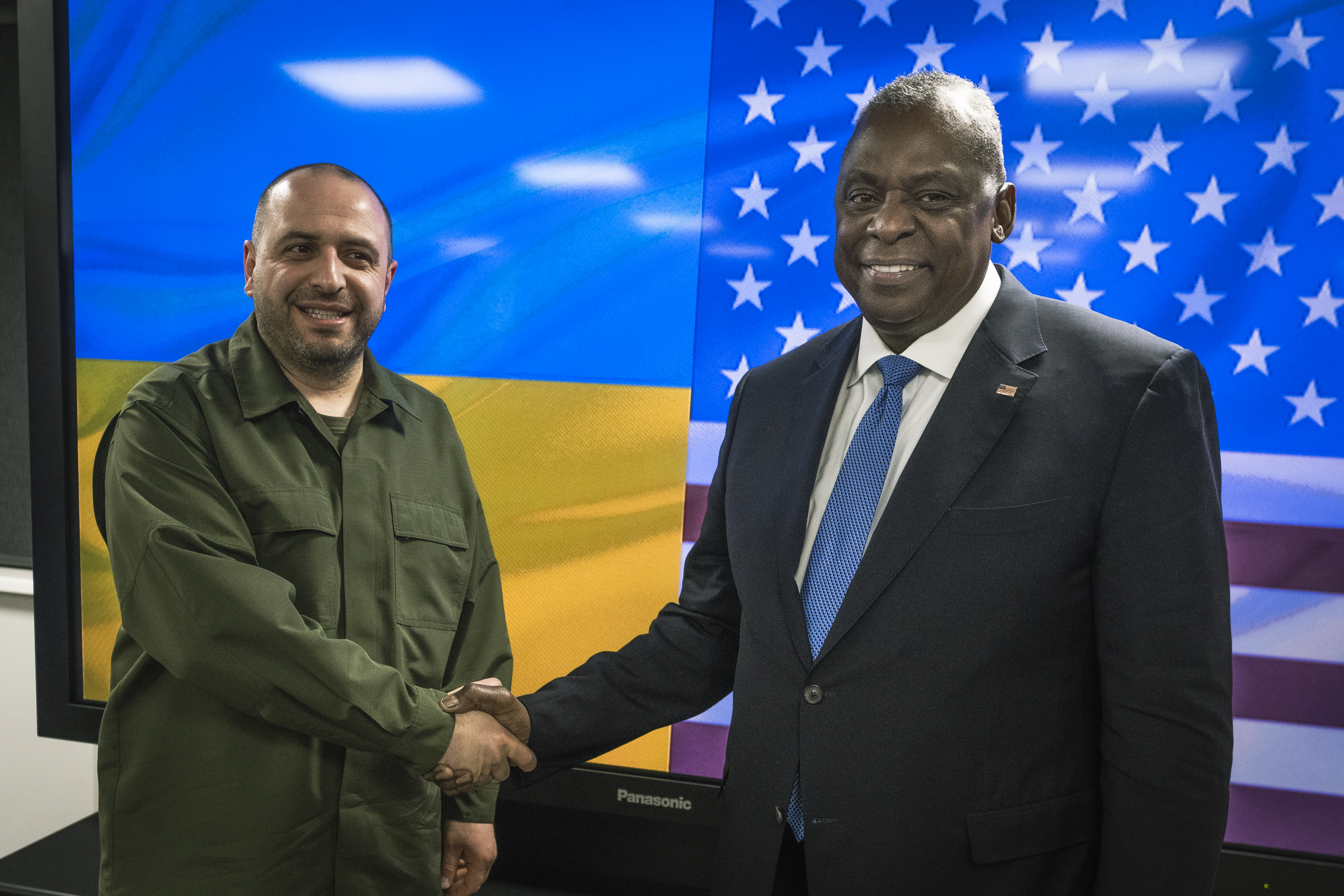
Austin with Ukrainian defense minister Rustem Umerov in Kyiv, November 20, 2023

The U.S.-led coalition has grown to include more than 50 countries – from North America to Europe to the Indo-Pacific – providing military assistance to help Ukraine. Collectively, as of September 2024, they have committed more than $106 billion in security assistance to Ukraine since Russia launched its invasion. Contributing UDCG countries have supplied Ukraine with air defense, armor, artillery ammunition and, recently, F-16 fighter jets, and the group of nations has also trained thousands of Ukrainian service members in these new capabilities. During the 24th meeting of the UDCG on September 6, 2024, Austin noted: "As a percentage of [gross domestic product], a dozen of our allies actually contribute more to Ukraine's self-defense than the United States, and we continue to see impressive new security assistance commitments."

At an October 31, 2023 Senate Appropriations Committee hearing, Austin told lawmakers that supplemental aid is needed to help Ukraine continue to defend itself against Russia's ongoing aggression. He said, “Today's battles against aggression and terrorism will define global security for years to come. And only firm American leadership can ensure that tyrants, thugs and terrorists worldwide are not emboldened to commit more aggression and more atrocities.”

On November 20, 2023, Austin met with President Zelenskyy and Defense Minister Rustem Umerov during an unannounced visit to Ukraine. It was his third visit as defense secretary and second since Russia's invasion. While in Kyiv, Austin announced a new security assistance package for Ukraine valued at up to $100 million. The package includes additional air defense capabilities, artillery ammunition, antitank weapons and other materials to help Ukrainian forces defend their territory amid Russia's ongoing assault. On November 22, Austin hosted the 17th meeting of the Ukraine Defense Contact Group virtually from the Pentagon.

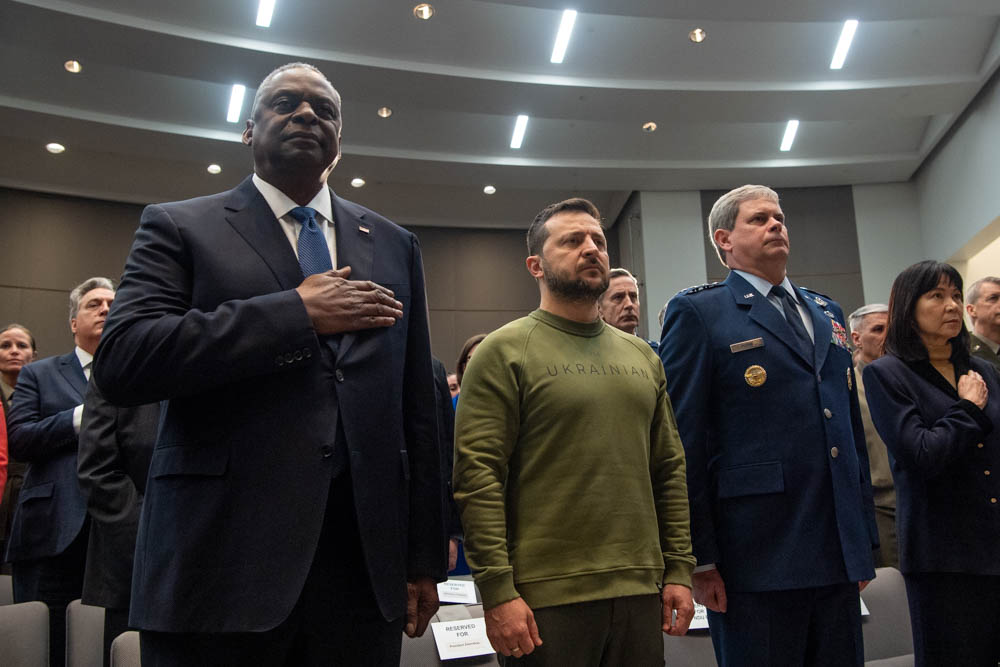
Austin with Ukrainian president Zelenskyy in Washington, D.C., December 11, 2023

On December 2, 2023, in his keynote address at the Reagan National Defense Forum held at the Ronald Reagan Presidential Library & Museum, Austin said, in part:

We must continue to be clear to the American people about the stakes in Ukraine. Ukraine matters profoundly to America and to the entire world. And it matters for four key reasons. First, Putin’s war poses a stark and direct threat to security in Europe and beyond. Second, Putin’s aggression is a clear challenge to our NATO allies. Third, the Kremlin’s deliberate cruelty is an attack on our shared values of democracy and decency. And finally, Putin’s war is a frontal assault on the international rules-based order. So the outcome of this struggle will define global security for decades to come. And we don’t have the option of sitting it out.

Austin went on to say: "If we do not stand up to the Kremlin’s naked aggression today, if we do not deter other would-be aggressors, we will only embolden them—and we will invite even more bloodshed and chaos. Russia’s invasion of Ukraine offers a grim preview of a world of tyranny and turmoil that should make us all shudder."

On December 27, 2023, the U.S. announced an additional $250 million package to help meet Ukraine's urgent security needs. The package includes lifesaving air-defense munitions, air-defense system components, ammunition for HIMARS, anti-armor munitions, 155-millimeter and 105-millimeter artillery ammunition, and medical equipment.

On February 23, 2024, Austin issued a statement marking two years since Russia's invasion of Ukraine. In it he acknowledged the work and continued commitment of the 50 countries that compose the Ukraine Defense Contact Group. Since Putin started this war, this historic coalition has committed more than $87 billion in security assistance to Ukraine—including 15 U.S. allies that, as a percentage of GDP, contribute more to Ukraine's capability needs than the United States.

On June 2, 2024, Austin met with Ukrainian president Volodymyr Zelenskyy in Singapore on the margins of the Shangri-La Dialogue to reiterate unwavering U.S. support for Ukraine in the face of Russian aggression. The two leaders pledged to further strengthen the strategic defense partnership between the United States and Ukraine.

On June 13, 2024, Austin hosted the 23rd meeting of the Ukraine Defense Contract Group in Brussels, Belgium. He was joined by Ukraine's Defense Minister Rustem Umerov. “I am proud that this Contact Group has committed more than $98 billion dollars in security assistance to Ukraine since February 2022. And this coalition continues to find innovative and sustainable ways to rush in critical capabilities to meet Ukraine's most pressing needs," Austin said.

On June 13, 2024, President Joe Biden and President Zelenskyy signed a 10-year bilateral security pact aimed at strengthening Ukraine's ability to defend itself in the present while also deterring aggression in the future. Per the agreement, the U.S. and Ukraine will spend the next 10 years building and maintaining Ukraine's credible defense and deterrence capability; strengthening Ukraine's capacity to sustain its fight over the long term; accelerating Ukraine's Euro-Atlantic integration; and consulting in the event of a future Russian armed attack against Ukraine. In a joint press conference at the G7 Summit in Fasano, Italy, President Biden said of the agreement: “ Our goal is to strengthen Ukraine’s credible defense and deterrence capabilities for the long term. A lasting peace for Ukraine must be underwritten by Ukraine’s own ability to defend itself now and to deter future aggression anytime in the ... future.”

In his prepared remarks, President Zelenskyy said:

Dear friends, today is a truly historic day. And we have signed the strongest agreement between Ukraine and the U.S. since our independence. And this is an agreement on security and thus on the protection of human life. This is an agreement on cooperation and thus on how our nations will become stronger. This is an agreement on steps to guarantee sustainable peace, and, therefore, it benefits everyone in the world because the Russian war against Ukraine is a real, real global threat.

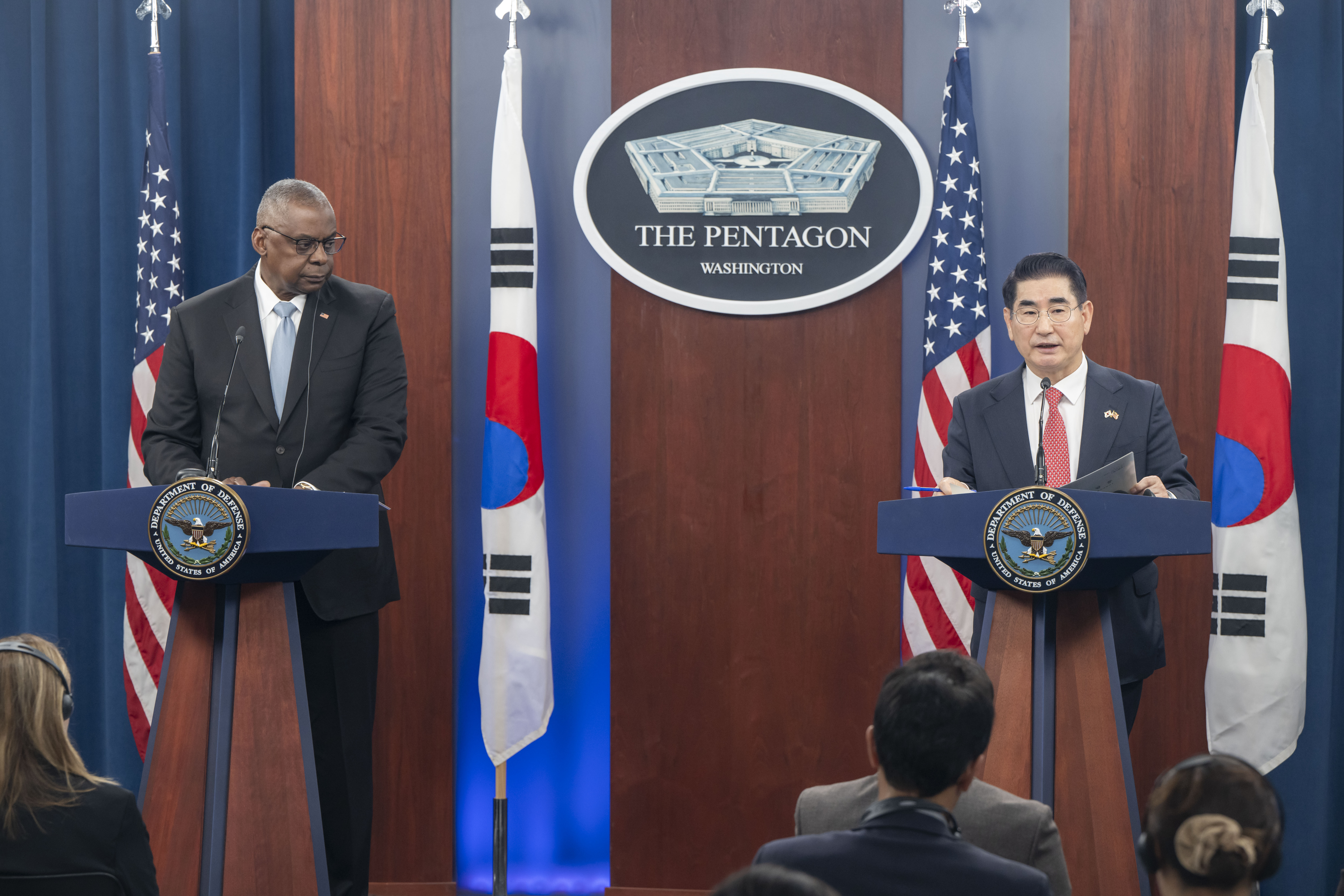
Austin holding a press conference with ROK minister of national defense Kim Yong-hyun regarding North Korea's artillery support during the Russo–Ukrainian War

On September 6, 2024, Austin hosted the 24th meeting of the Ukraine Defense Contact Group, where he welcomed special guest Ukrainian President Volodymyr Zelenskyy. In his prepared remarks, Austin told Zelenskyy: "Your forces and your people have inspired the world, and you have seen firsthand how this contact group has moved heaven and earth to get Ukraine what it needs." He continued: "On behalf of everyone here, we hear your urgency, and we share it. This coalition of some 50 nations of goodwill stands united and firm; and today, we'll push even harder to step up our support for Ukraine."

In his remarks, Zelenskyy said: "I very much appreciate [the UDCG] continuously being with [Ukraine] since the start of this war," adding that it's thanks to the bravery of the Ukrainian people and the support of the UDCG that Ukraine has been able to continue resisting Russia's aggression. On October 21, 2024, Austin made his fourth visit to Ukraine, where he met with President Zelenskyy and members of his leadership team in Kyiv. Austin also met with Ukraine's minister of defense Rustem Umerov, reaffirming to both the United States' unwavering support for Ukraine. According to a US defense official, during Austin's meeting with Zelenskyy, Austin emphasized the importance of Ukraine defending the territory it has taken inside Russia's Kursk region and capitalizing on those gains, as well as fending off the Russians in the eastern Ukrainian city of Pokrovsk. They also discussed how Ukraine can shore up its manpower, as the military has struggled lately with force regeneration and recruitment.

During a speech delivered at the Diplomatic Academy of Ukraine in Kyiv, Austin stated:

When the largest military in Europe becomes a force of aggression, the whole continent feels the shock. When a permanent member of the U.N. Security Council tries to deny self-rule to more than 40 million people, the whole world feels the blow. And when a dictator puts his imperial fantasies ahead of the rights of a free people, the whole international system feels the outrage. And so that's why nations of goodwill from every corner of the planet have seen and have risen to Ukraine's defense. And that's why the United States and our allies and partners have proudly become the arsenal of Ukrainian democracy.

In his remarks, Austin also emphasized the importance of continued U.S. and coalition support for Ukraine:

For anyone who thinks that American leadership is expensive — well, consider the price of American retreat,” he said. “In the face of aggression, the price of principle is always dwarfed by the cost of capitulation. Our allies and partners know that. And I’ve been proud to watch the pro-Ukraine coalition dig deep.

==== Africa ====
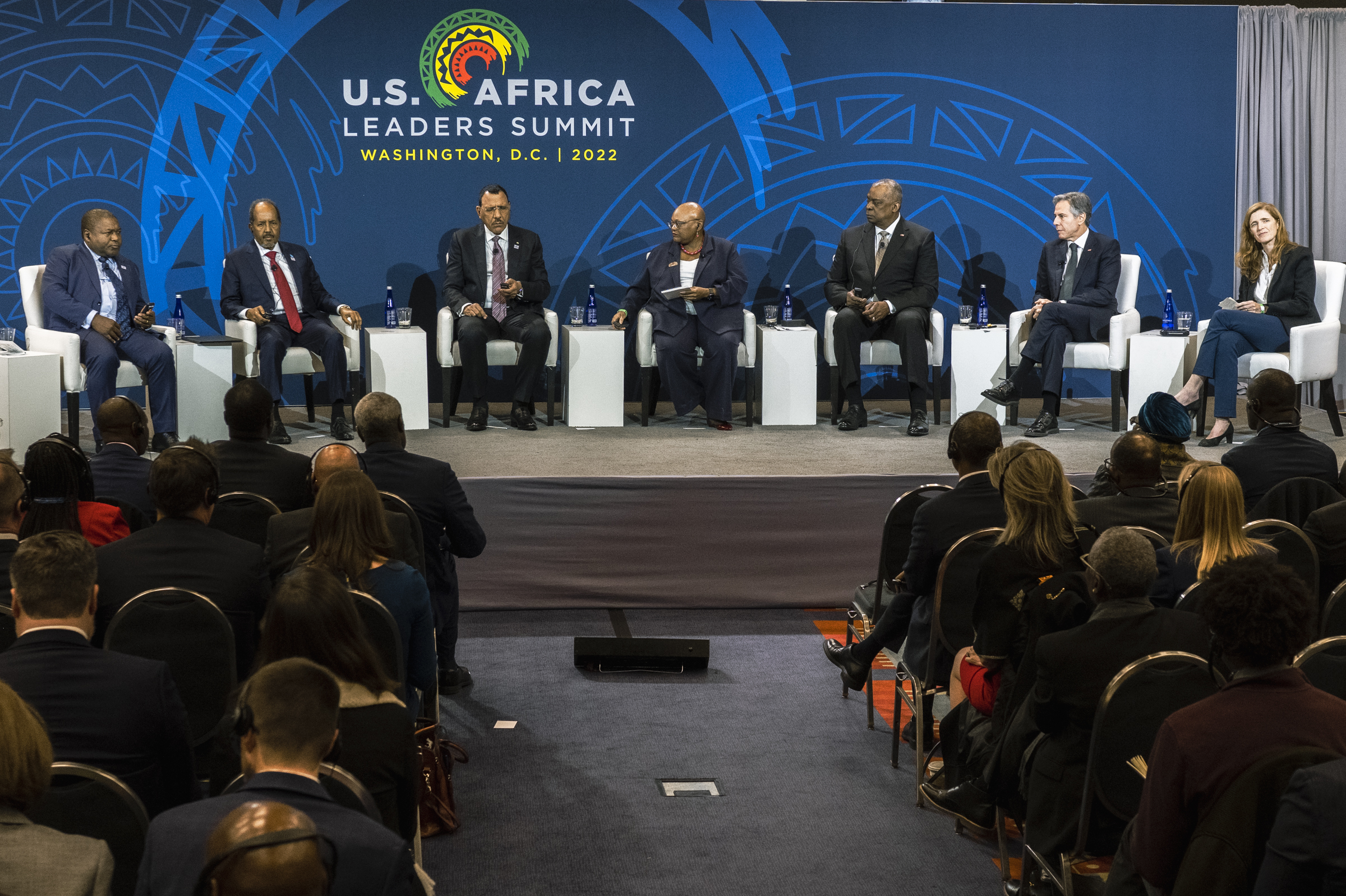
Austin at the United States–Africa Leaders Summit 2022

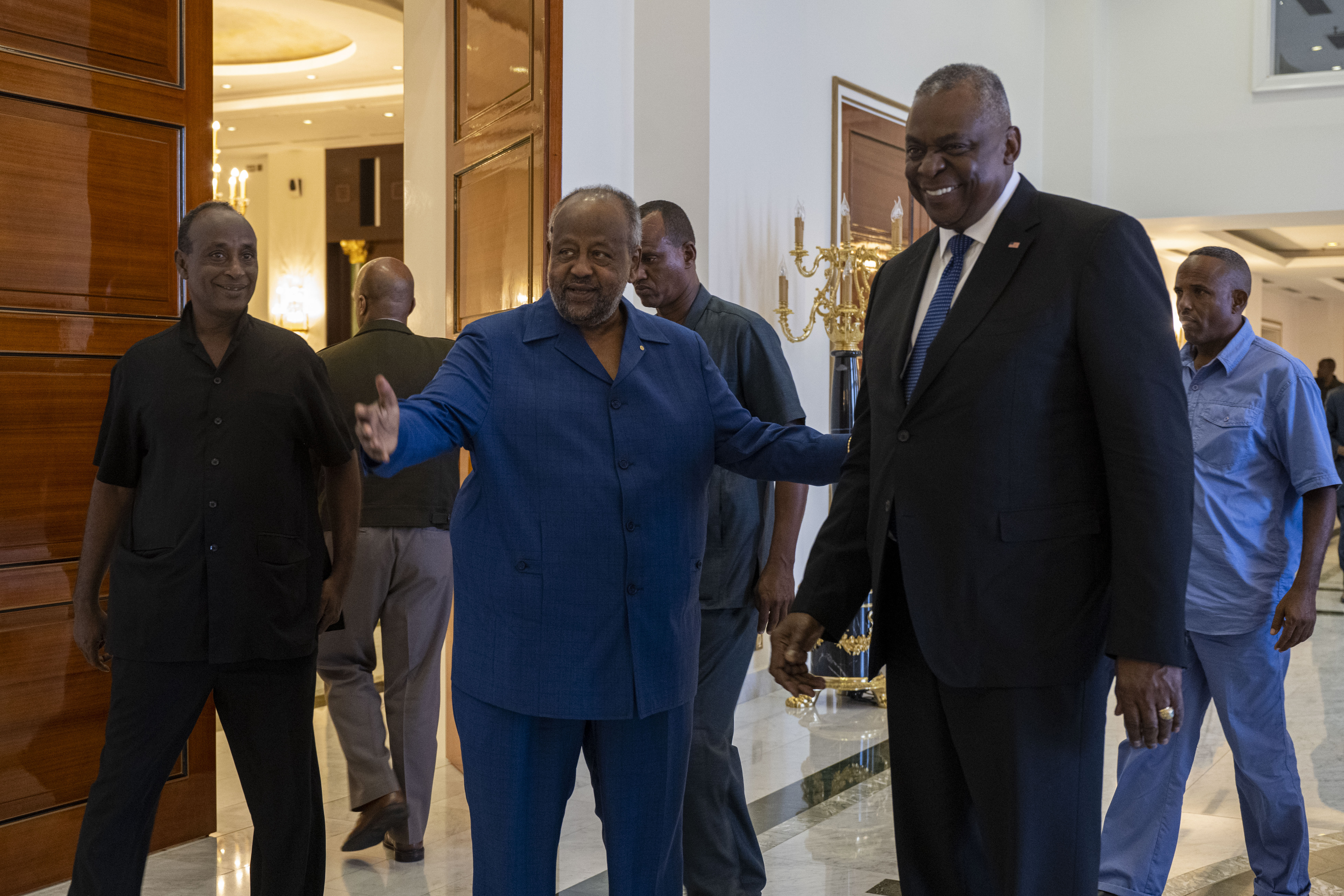
Austin with Djibouti's president Ismaïl Omar Guelleh, September 24, 2023

In September 2023, Austin made his first trip to Africa as secretary of defense. He started his tour in Djibouti, home to the primary U.S. military base on the African continent, Camp Lemonnier, where he met with Djibouti's president Ismaïl Omar Guelleh and Somali president Hassan Sheikh Mohamud. He then traveled to Kenya, where he and Kenyan Defense Minister Aden Duale signed a five-year security agreement to support working together against their common terror threat. Austin also pledged $100 million in support of Kenyan security deployments, as Kenya prepares to lead a multinational peacekeeping mission to Haiti to combat gang violence. He concluded his trip on Africa's western coast, becoming the first U.S. defense secretary to ever visit Angola.

In a speech delivered at the National Archives Auditorium in Luanda, Angola on September 27, Austin said:

I'm here in Angola to strengthen that robust and equal partnership. But I'm also here to underscore an important point, and that is that Africa matters. It matters profoundly to the shape of the 21st Century world. And it matters for our common prosperity and our shared security.

He went on to say:

We know that the walk to freedom can be long, and no one gets it right all of the time. You know, I love my country so much that I fought for it, but America isn't trying to cover up for our imperfections. When a democracy falls short, when it falls short of its best traditions, as we all sometimes do, the whole world gets to see it. But that's not the point. The genius of a democracy is not that it's perfect. The genius of a democracy is that it can always open up space to let its citizen strive to live the universal values of freedom and self-government and human rights. And the genius of a democracy is that it is always a work in progress, and that's personal for me. I am a child of America's segregated South. I grew up in a time of legalized and racist segregation in America, and I stand here today in Africa as America's first black secretary of defense.

=== Farewell ceremony ===
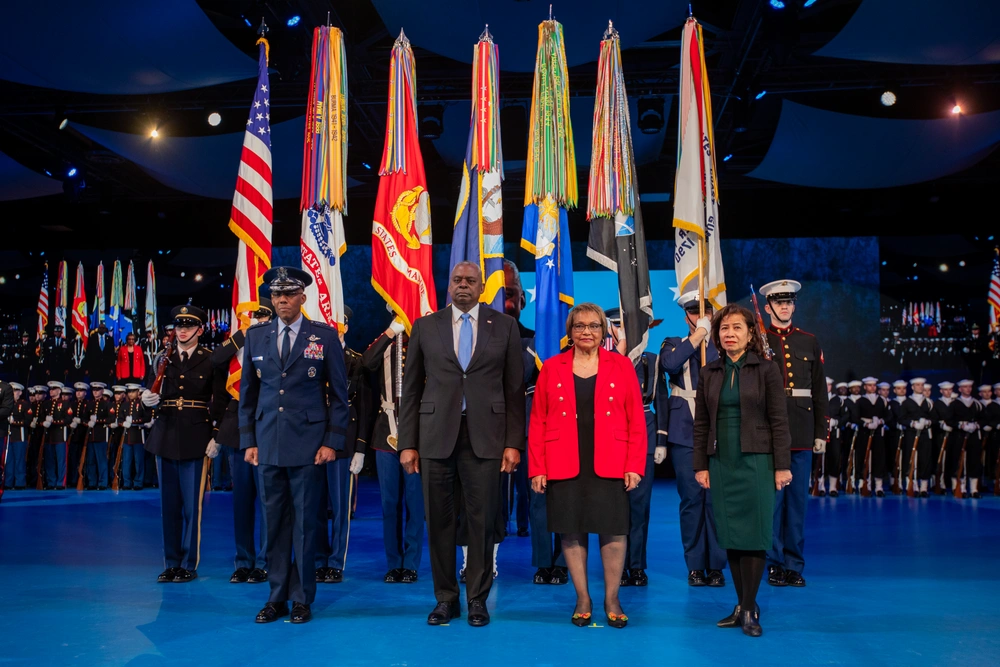
Farewell ceremony in honor of Secretary Lloyd J. Austin III, January 17, 2025

Austin was honored with a farewell ceremony hosted by Chairman of the Joint Chiefs of Staff General CQ Brown at Conmy Hall on Joint Base Myer-Henderson Hall on January 17, 2025. In his farewell remarks, Austin lauded the accomplishments of the Department of Defense during his four-year tenure. He said, in part:

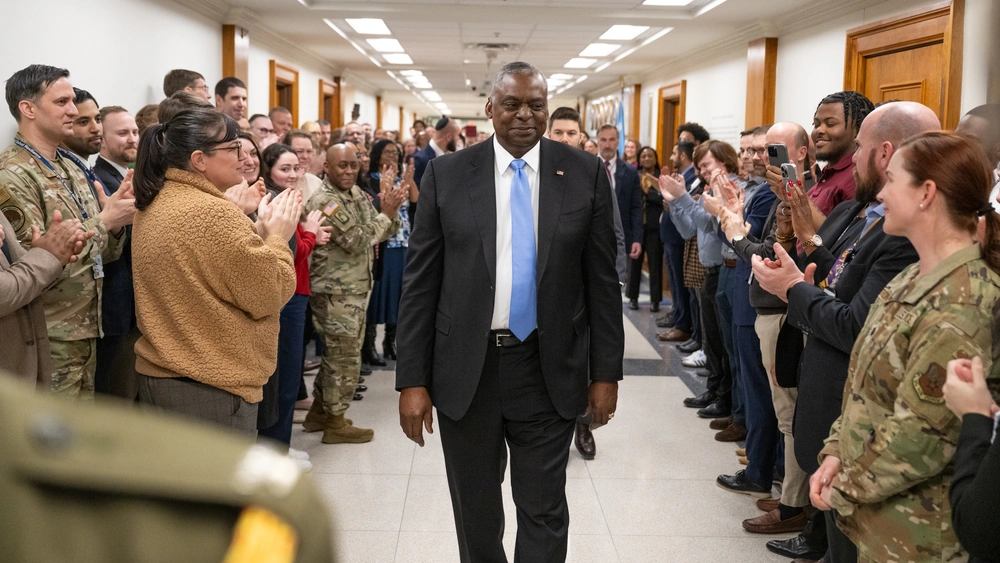
Traditional clap-out ceremony

For the past four years, we've stood up to our rivals, we've weakened our foes, strengthened our friends, invested in our future, and done right by our people. Now, that doesn't just happen. And I am incredibly grateful to the exceptional team that has changed the course of history.

Austin received a traditional clap-out ceremony as he departed the Pentagon on his final day on January 17, 2025.

== Personal life ==
Austin was raised by a devoutly Catholic mother and remains practicing himself.

As of December 2020, Austin and his wife, Charlene Denise Banner Austin, had been married for forty years. She has worked as a non-profit administrator and served on the board of the Military Family Research Institute at Purdue University. Austin has two stepsons.

== Awards and decorations ==
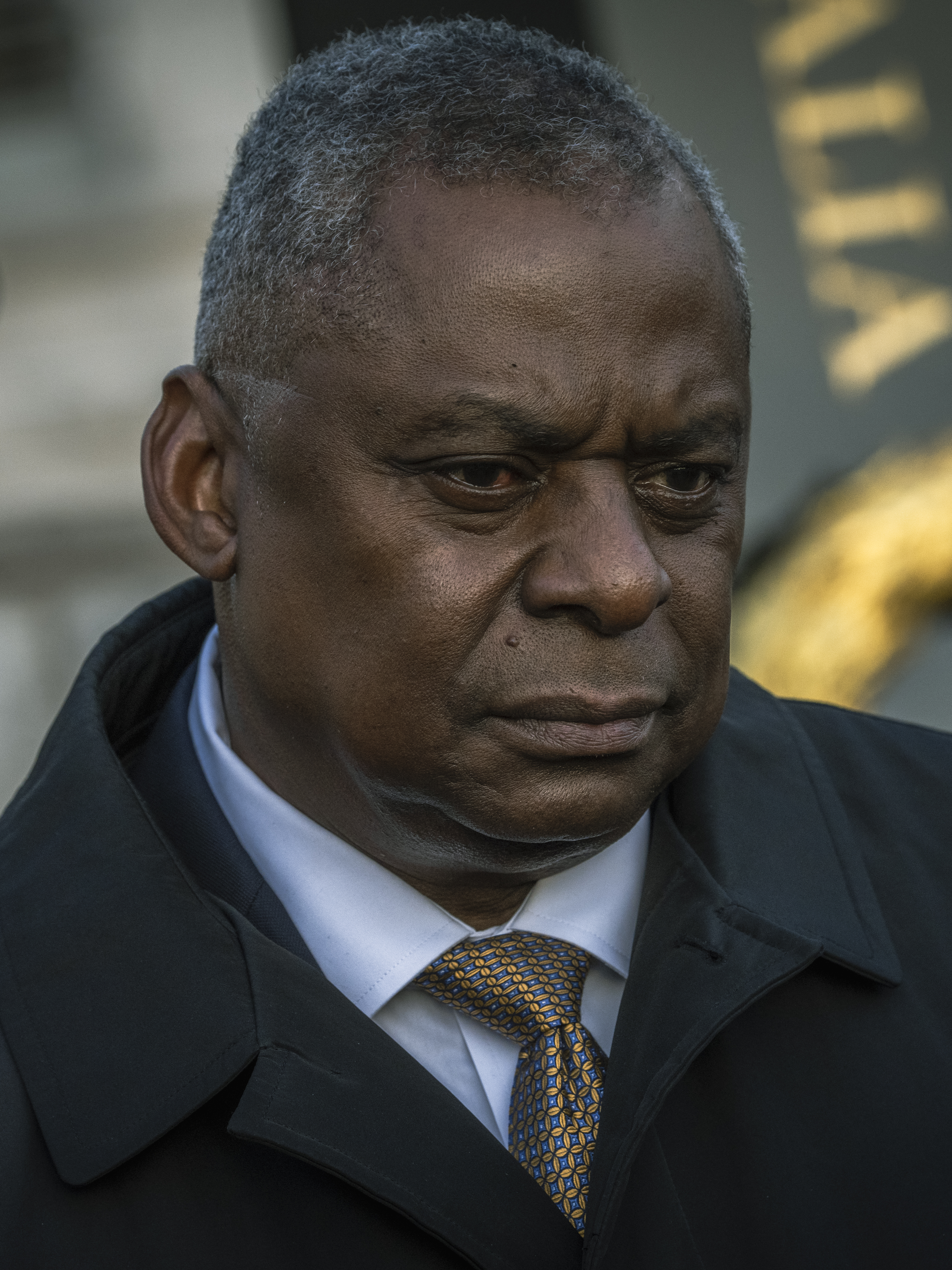
Austin in South Korea, 2023

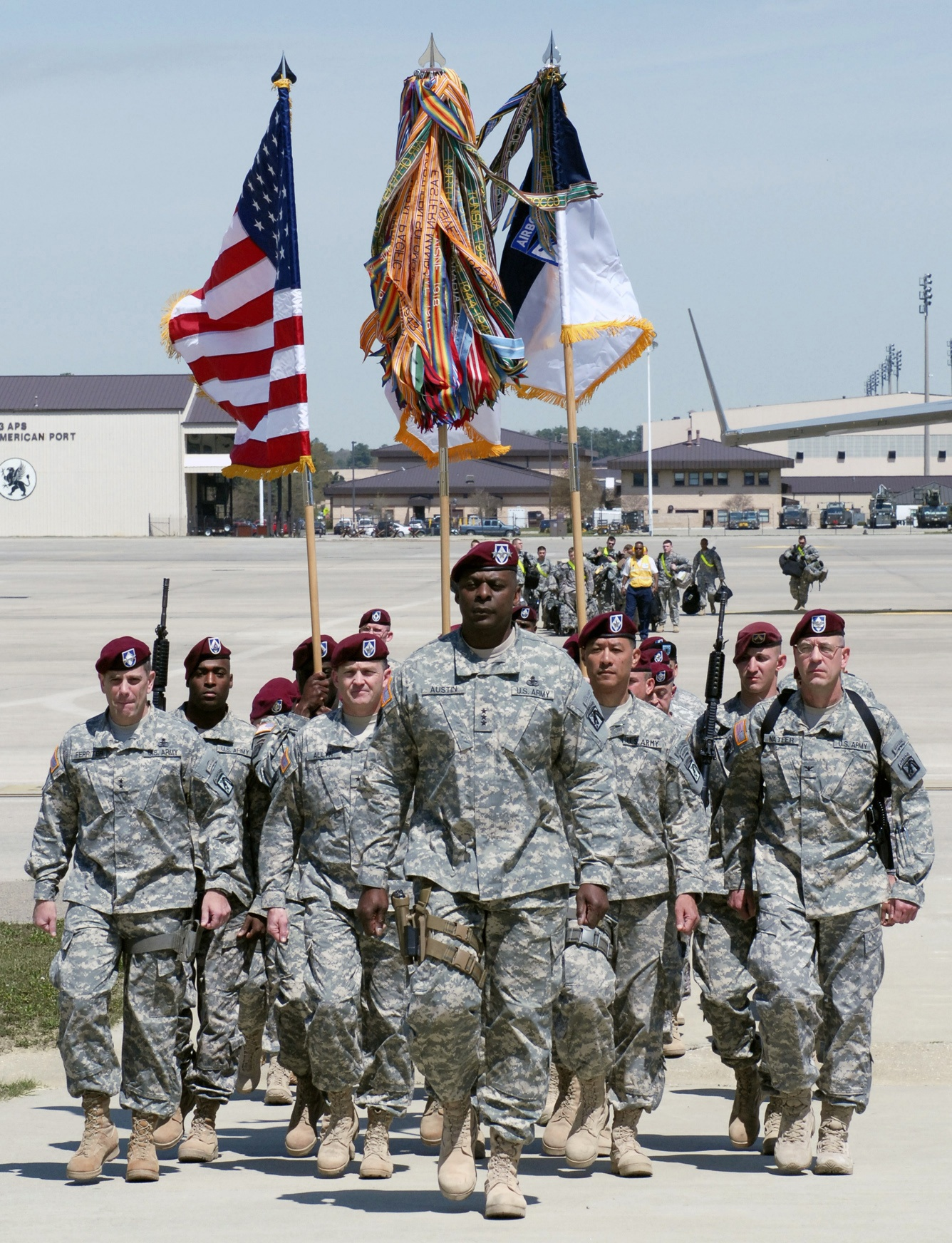
The XVIII Airborne Corps command group returns home from Operation Iraqi Freedom in April 2009; Austin is in front

Personal decorations
Defense Distinguished Service Medal with four bronze oak leaf clusters
Army Distinguished Service Medal with three oak leaf clusters
Silver Star
Defense Superior Service Medal with oak leaf cluster
Legion of Merit with oak leaf cluster
Defense Meritorious Service Medal
Meritorious Service Medal with four oak leaf clusters
Joint Service Commendation Medal
Army Commendation Medal with silver oak leaf cluster (5 bronze oak leaf clusters)
Army Achievement Medal with oak leaf cluster
Unit Awards
Army Presidential Unit Citation
Joint Meritorious Unit Award with two oak leaf clusters
State Department awards
Secretary's Distinguished Service Award, Department of State
Campaign and service medals
National Defense Service Medal with two bronze service stars
Armed Forces Expeditionary Medal
Afghanistan Campaign Medal with campaign star
Iraq Campaign Medal with three campaign stars
Global War on Terrorism Expeditionary Medal with two service stars
Global War on Terrorism Service Medal
Humanitarian Service Medal
Service and training awards
Army Service Ribbon
Army Overseas Service Ribbon with bronze award numeral 3

Other accoutrements
Combat Action Badge
Expert Infantryman Badge
Ranger Tab
Master Parachutist Badge
United States Central Command Badge
Office of the Joint Chiefs of Staff Identification Badge
Army Staff Identification Badge
XVIII Airborne Corps Combat Service Identification Badge
505th Infantry Regiment Distinctive Unit Insignia

- 2007 inductee into the Thomasville County Sports Hall of Fame.

== Publications ==
- Austin, Lloyd J.; Pollack, Kenneth M.; Wittes, Tamara Cofman (August 14, 2015). The Middle East in Transition (Report). Washington, DC: Brookings Institution.
- Austin, Lloyd J. (September 16, 2015). Statement of General Lloyd J. Austin III, Commander, U.S. Central Command, Before the Senate Armed Services Committee on Operation Inherent Resolve (PDF) (Speech).

== See also ==
- List of African-American United States Cabinet members

== General sources ==
- Gordon, Michael R.; Trainor, Bernard E. (2013). The Endgame: The Inside Story of the Struggle for Iraq, from George W. Bush to Barack Obama. New York: Vintage Books. ISBN 978-0-307-38894-0. OCLC 819383400.

Military offices
Preceded by Franklin L. Hagenbeck	Commander of the 10th Mountain Division; 2003–2005	Succeeded by Benjamin Freakley
Preceded by John Vines	Commander of the XVIII Airborne Corps; 2006–2009	Succeeded by Frank Helmick
Preceded by Raymond Odierno	Commanding General of the Multinational Corps–Iraq; 2008–2009	Succeeded by Charles H. Jacoby Jr.
Preceded by Raymond Odierno	Commanding General of the United States Forces-Iraq; 2010–2011	Position abolished
Preceded by Bruce Grooms; Acting	Director of the Joint Staff; 2009–2010	Succeeded by William Gortney
Preceded by Peter W. Chiarelli	Vice Chief of Staff of the United States Army; 2012–2013	Succeeded by John Campbell
Preceded by Jim Mattis	Commander of United States Central Command; 2013–2016	Succeeded by Joseph Votel
Political offices
Preceded by Mark Esper	United States Secretary of Defense; 2021–2025	Succeeded by Pete Hegseth
U.S. order of precedence (ceremonial)
Preceded by Dan Brouillette as Former U.S. Cabinet Member	Order of precedence of the United States as Former U.S. Cabinet Member	Succeeded by Janet Yellen as Former U.S. Cabinet Member
