= David O. Cooke =

American lawyer

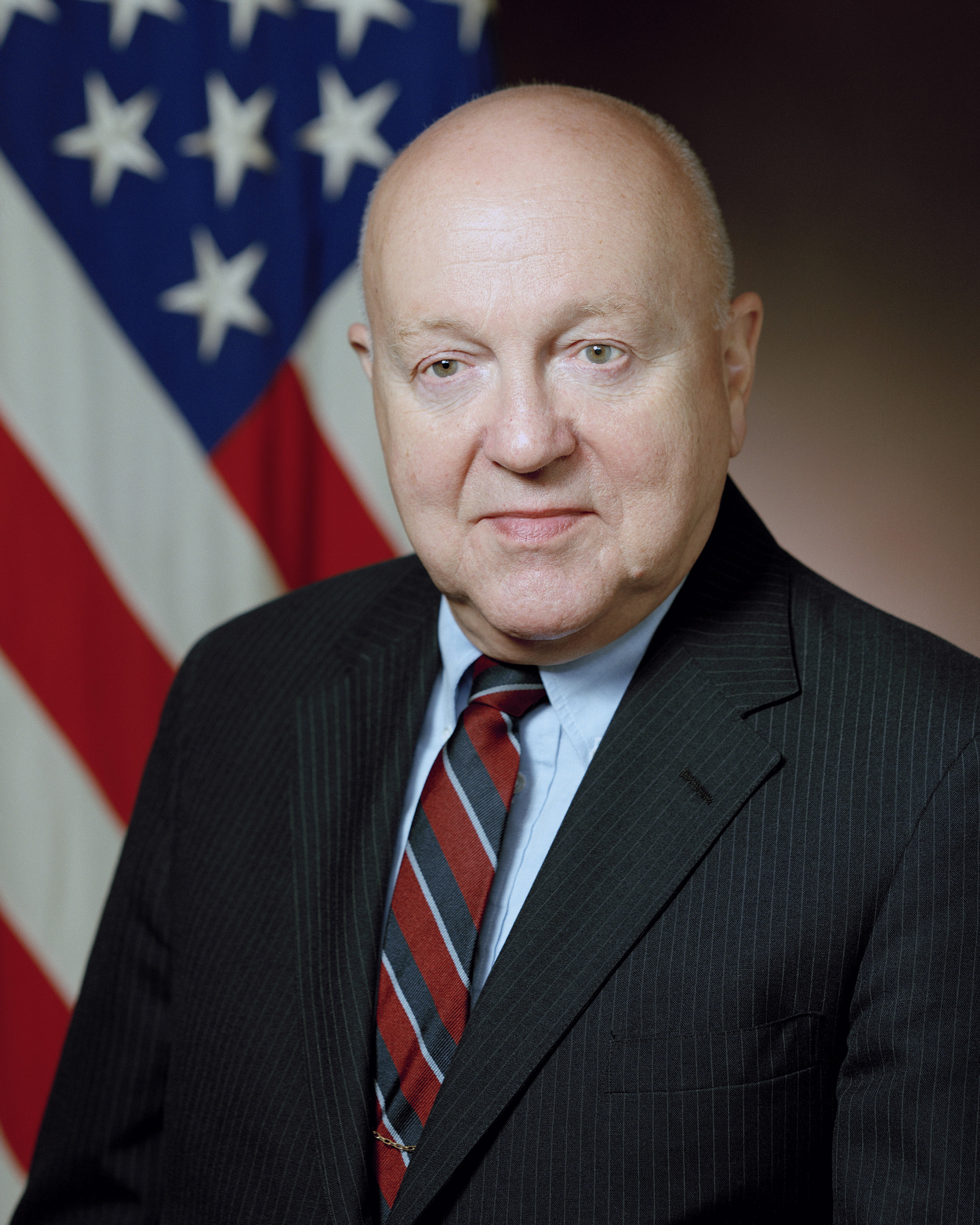
- Official portrait

Director of Administration and Management
- In office November 4, 1971 – June 22, 2002
- President: Richard Nixon; Gerald Ford; Jimmy Carter; Ronald Reagan; George H. W. Bush; Bill Clinton; George W. Bush
- Secretary of Defense: Full list: Melvin R. Laird; Elliot L. Richardson; James R. Schlesinger; Donald H. Rumsfeld; Harold Brown; Caspar W. Weinberger; Frank C. Carlucci III; William H. Taft IV (Acting); Richard B. Cheney; Leslie Aspin, Jr.; William J. Perry; William S. Cohen; Donald H. Rumsfeld

Personal details
- Born: David Ohlmer Cooke; August 31, 1920 Buffalo, New York
- Died: June 22, 2002 (aged 81)
- Resting place: Arlington National Cemetery
- Spouse: Marion McDonald (m. 1950; d. 1999)
- Children: 3
- Education: University at Buffalo (B.S.); George Washington University (J.D.)
- Nickname(s): "Doc", "Mayor of the Pentagon"

Military service
- Allegiance: United States
- Branch/service: United States Navy
- Years of service: 1942–1968
- Rank: Captain
- Battles/wars: World War II

David Ohlmer "Doc" Cooke (August 31, 1920 – June 22, 2002) was a United States Department of Defense civilian administrator who served under twelve Secretaries of Defense over a period of 45 years. Often called the "Mayor of the Pentagon", Cooke was the department's highest-ranking career civil servant as Director of Administration and Management, and as Director of Washington Headquarters Services. He was also responsible for administering the oath of office for many key department officials.

== Early life ==
Cooke was born in Buffalo, New York in 1920. He graduated from the State University of New York at Buffalo with a B.S. degree in 1941, and earned his M.S. degree from the State University of New York at Albany in 1942. He served in the United States Navy during World War II and later earned his Juris Doctor degree from The George Washington University in 1950. Cooke went back on active duty in 1951 and served in a number of posts until he retired as a Navy captain in 1968.

== Government career ==
Cooke had a federal government career of more than 45 years in the Pentagon from 1957 to 2002. Notable positions he served in include Deputy Assistant Secretary of Defense for Administration from 1971 to 1988, Director of the Washington Headquarters Services since 1977, and Director of Administration and Management in the Office of the Secretary of Defense since 1988.

Cooke was involved with Defense Department management issues since 1958, when he served on Defense Secretary Neil McElroy's task force on Department of Defense reorganization. He served under Defense Secretary Robert McNamara and helped institute changes in departmental management. Following his Navy retirement, Cooke headed the Department's Office of Organizational and Management Planning, a job that evolved into his final post. In this position, Cooke was responsible for the physical plant and personnel administration of the Pentagon. His responsibilities for security, maintenance, and operations in the building earned him the title "Mayor" - the phrase "Mayor of the Pentagon" had often been used to refer to him during his tenure, a nickname that continued to be used for those who held the position after him, including Raymond F. DuBois.

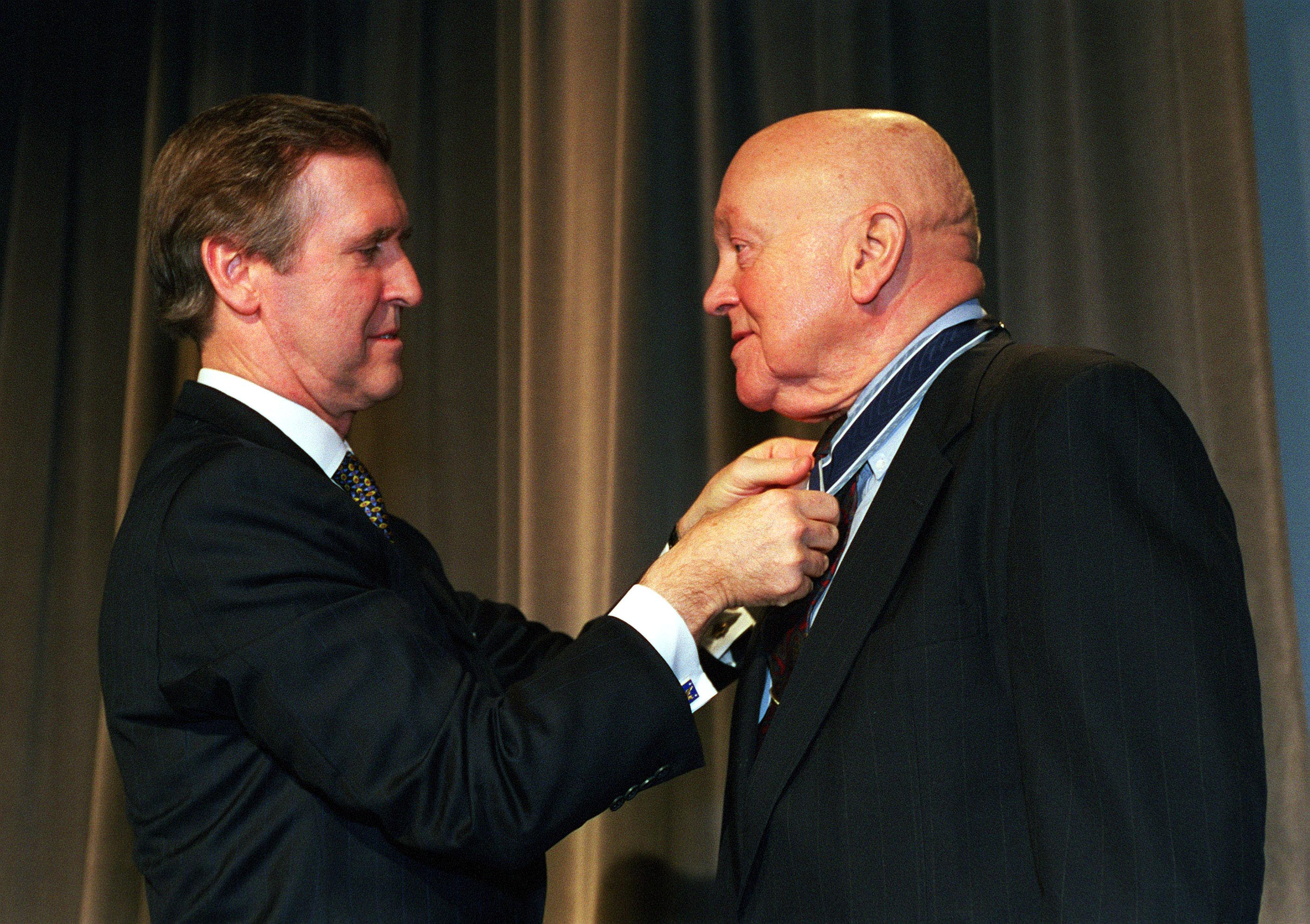
Secretary of Defense William S. Cohen presents Cooke with the President's Award for Distinguished Federal Civilian Service, January 1999.

== Death and legacy ==
On June 22, 2002, Cooke died from injuries that were a result of a car accident on June 6. He is buried at Arlington National Cemetery in Virginia, overlooking the Pentagon. His wife of 52 years, Marion McDonald Cooke, died in 1999. The couple had raised three children, Michele C. Sutton of Springfield, David Cooke and Lot Cooke, both of Fairfax. He also had two grandchildren at the time of his death. Elizabeth M. Cooke, who was born in 2000, and David B. Cooke who was born in 2002 a week before Cooke's death (both children from David O. Cooke Jr.).

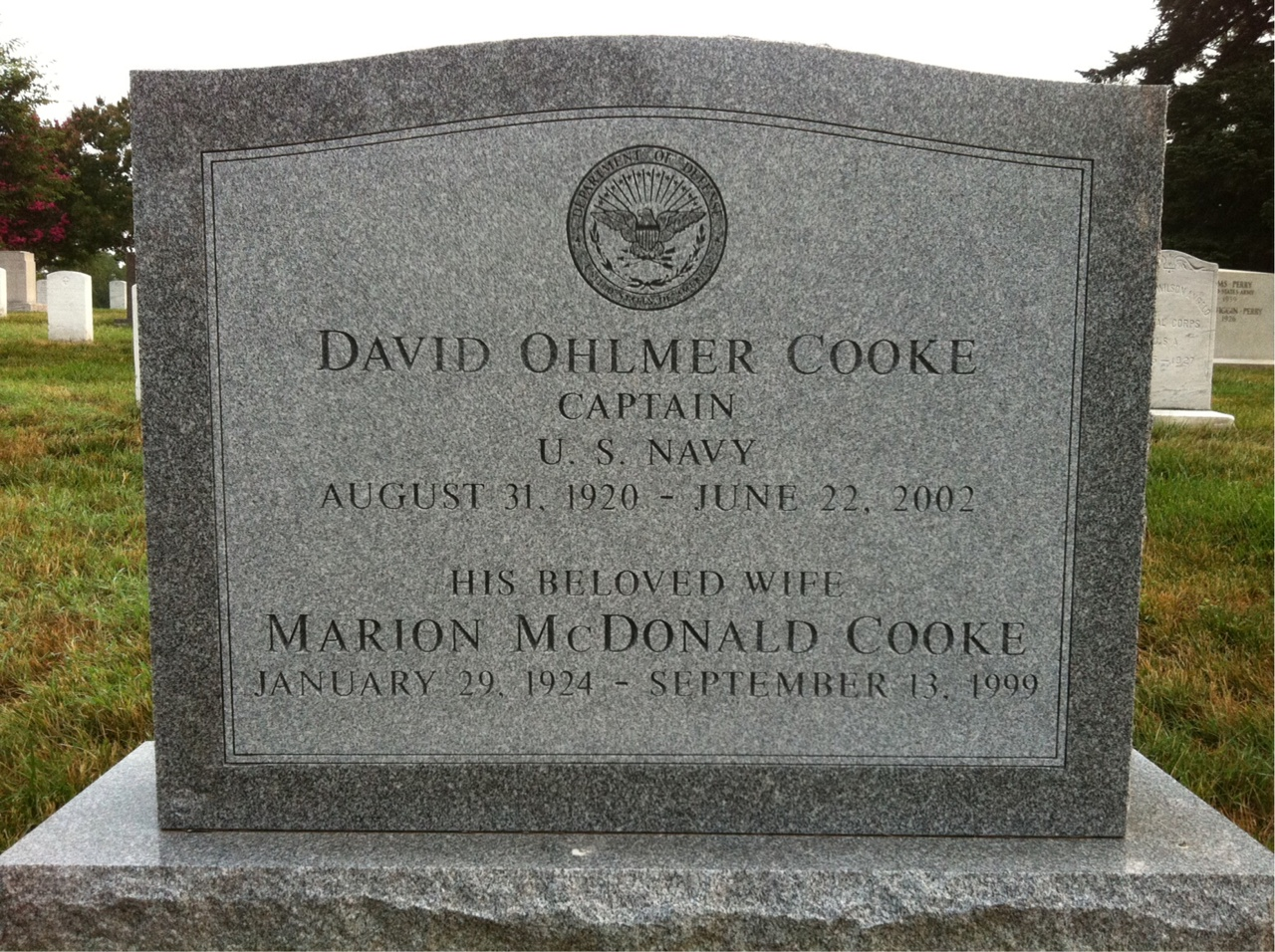
Cooke's grave at Arlington National Cemetery.

In 2005, the "David O. Cooke Excellence in Public Administration Award" was established in Cooke's honor to recognize a DoD employee with three to 10 years of federal service who occupies a non-managerial position and exhibits great potential as a future federal executive.

== Recognitions ==
Cooke received numerous awards for his work. He received the Department of Defense Distinguished Civilian Service Award seven times. He also received the Secretary of Defense Medal for Outstanding Public Service and the Department of Defense Medal for Distinguished Public Service two times. Both medals are rarely awarded to career civil servants. Other awards included the NAACP Benjamin L. Hooks Distinguished Service Award (1994); the Government Executive Leadership Award (1995); the Presidential Distinguished Rank Award (1995); the National Public Service Award (1997); the President's Award for Distinguished Federal Civilian Service (1998); the John O. Marsh Public Service Award (2000); the Senior Executives Association Board of Directors Award (2001); and the American Society for Public Administration Elmer B. Staats Lifetime Achievement Award for Distinguished Service (2002).
