= Robert G. Salesses =

Acting U.S. Secretary of Defense in 2025

Robert Salesses
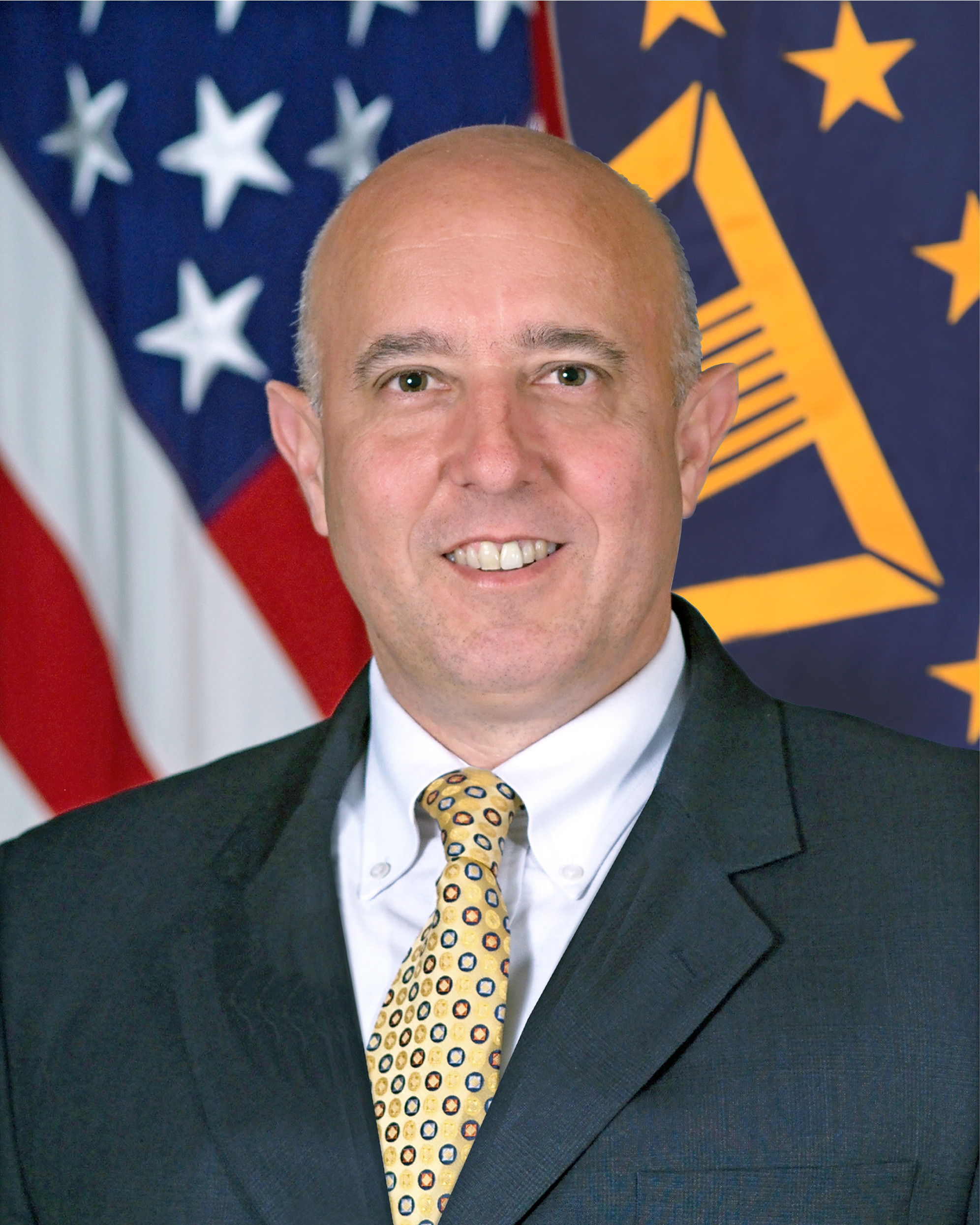
- Official portrait, 2025

8th Director of Administration and Management
- Incumbent
- Assumed office June 2025
- President: Donald Trump
- Preceded by: Jennifer C. Walsh

Acting United States Deputy Secretary of Defense
- In office January 28, 2025 – March 17, 2025
- President: Donald Trump
- Preceded by: Kathleen Hicks
- Succeeded by: Steve Feinberg

Acting United States Secretary of Defense
- In office January 20, 2025 – January 25, 2025
- President: Donald Trump
- Preceded by: Lloyd Austin
- Succeeded by: Pete Hegseth

Personal details
- Education: Rhode Island College (BA); Naval War College (MA)

Military service
- Allegiance: United States
- Branch/service: United States Marine Corps
- Battles/wars: Gulf War
- Awards: Bronze Star Medal

Robert G. Salesses is the Director of Administration and Management in the U.S. Department of Defense who served as the Acting Secretary of Defense in the Trump Administration from January 20, 2025 to January 25, 2025. He was formerly a U.S. Marine Corps officer and has served in multiple positions in the Department of Defense.

As Deputy Director for Washington Headquarters Services, he manages a portfolio of complex and integrated operational services to the Office of the Secretary of Defense, Joint Chiefs of Staff, and other military and Department of Defense agencies. He provides oversight of financial, contracting, security, human resources, and other logistical operations that support nearly 100,000 Department of Defense personnel.

== Education ==
Salesses earned a Bachelor of Arts in Management and Economics from Rhode Island College, followed by a Master of Arts in National Security and Strategic Studies from the Naval War College.

== Career ==
Salesses served as a United States Marine Corps officer, where he was involved in the planning and execution of several military contingencies and crisis responses. His career culminated in an assignment to the Joint Chief of Staff where he developed response options for global contingency missions. Salesses was awarded the Bronze Star Medal for his service during the liberation of Kuwait.

Salesses started his federal civilian career after the September 11 attacks where he served as Special Assistant for the Homeland Security Task Force. In 2005, he was appointed to the Senior Executive Service. He served as Deputy Assistant Secretary of Defense for Defense Continuity and Mission Assurance, and then Deputy Director, Washington Headquarters Services. During his time as the latter, he also was Acting Director, Facilities Services Directorate.

During his federal civil service career, he has been awarded the DoD Distinguished, Meritorious, and Exceptional Civil Service Awards and the Armed Forces Civilian Service Medal. Additionally, he has been awarded the Presidential Rank Awards twice.

Political offices
Preceded by Lloyd Austin	United States Secretary of Defense; Acting; 2025	Succeeded by Pete Hegseth
Preceded by Kathleen Hicks	United States Deputy Secretary of Defense; Acting; 2025	Succeeded by Steve Feinberg
