= Director of Administration and Management (Department of Defense) =

- DA&M
- Seal of the Department of Defense

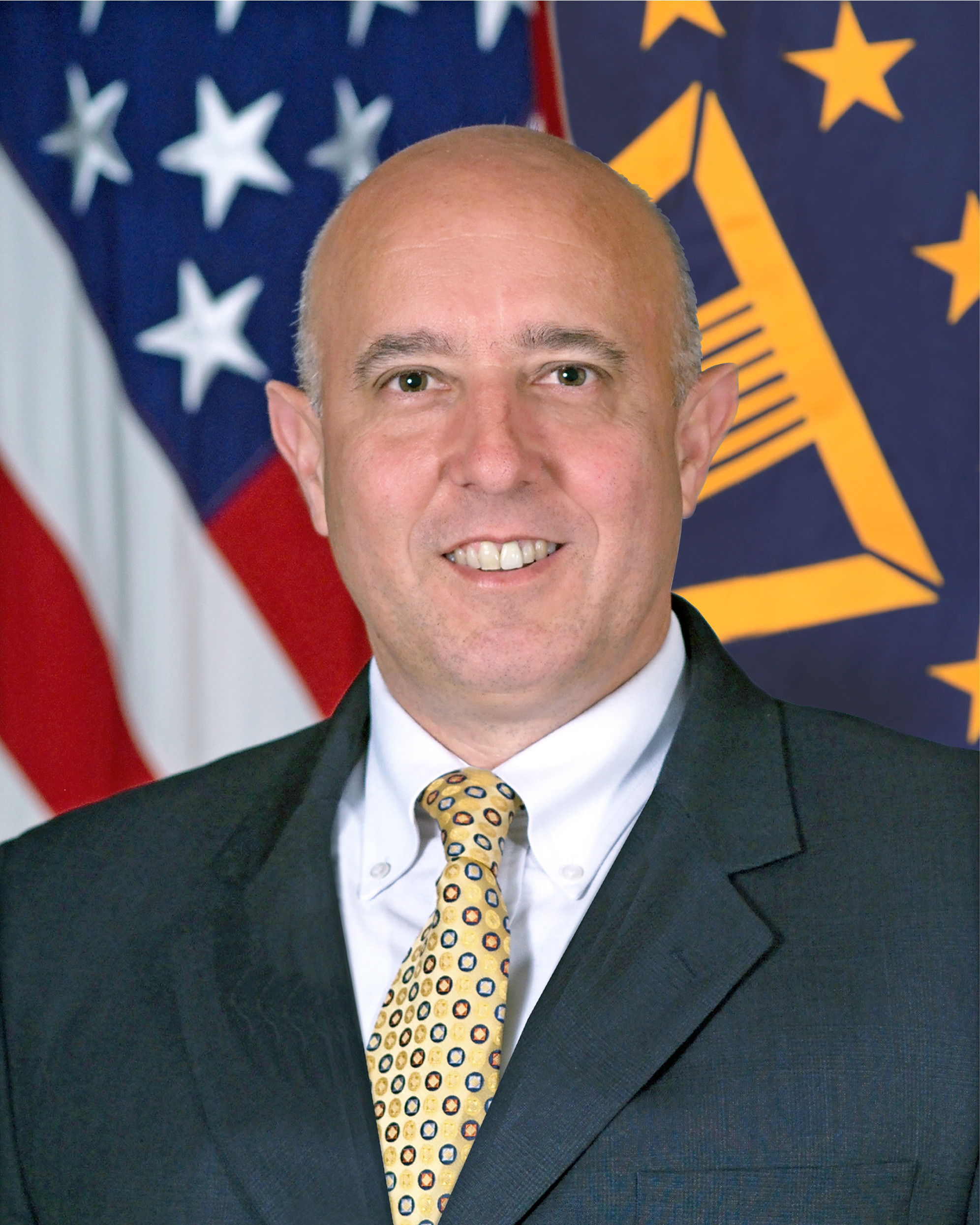
- Incumbent; Robert G. Salesses since June 2025
- Department of Defense; Office of the Secretary of Defense
- Reports to: Secretary of Defense; Deputy Secretary of Defense
- Seat: The Pentagon, Arlington County, Virginia, United States
- Appointer: Secretary of Defense
- Term length: No fixed term
- Precursor: Deputy Assistant Secretary of Defense for Administration
- Formation: 1988
- First holder: David O. Cooke
- Website: dam.defense.gov

The Director of Administration and Management, or DA&M, is a position within the Office of the Secretary of Defense (OSD) at the Department of Defense. As the principal staff assistant and advisor to the Secretary and Deputy Secretary of Defense concerning organizational and administrative management matters, the DA&M is responsible for: developing and maintaining organizational charters and overseeing assigned programs such as DoD Committee Management, DoD Headquarters Management, the OSD Historical Program, the DoD Freedom of Information Act Program, the DoD Privacy Program, the DoD Civil Liberties program, the OSD Internal Management Control Program, and OSD Information Technology/CIO programs. Additionally, the DA&M performs management and oversight responsibilities for the Pentagon Force Protection Agency and the Washington Headquarters Services, a 1,300 employee, $1.3 billion field activity.

== Responsibilities ==
The DA&M has three principal responsibilities: to advise the Secretary and DoD senior leaders team on organizational and management matters of institutional importance; to oversee and provide a range of administrative, logistical, facilities, and technology support to the Pentagon Reservation - the headquarters of the U.S. Defense establishment and a highly visible symbol of U.S. military power - and DoD-leased facilities in the National Capital Region (NCR); and to secure and protect the people, facilities, and infrastructure of the Pentagon Reservation and DoD-leased facilities in the NCR. Although the DA&M is considered to be part of the OSD, the post does not explicitly require Senate confirmation.

The DoD General Counsel is the Regulatory Policy Officer responsible for monitoring regulatory activities within DoD to ensure uniform compliance with the implementation of executive and legislative requirements and priorities. Nevertheless, the DA&M is considered the "functional proponent" for the DoD Regulatory Program and the Plan, and so oversees the operational requirements of the regulatory process. For example, the retrospective review of DoD rules required by Executive Order 13563 is a "special focus of interest" for the DA&M. EO 13563, signed by President Obama on January 18, 2011, directed all Federal agencies to "promote predictability and reduce uncertainty" in America's regulatory code by ensuring that existing regulations are "accessible, consistent, written in plain language, and easy to understand."

== History ==
This position originated in 1949 as the Assistant Secretary of Defense (Administration and Public Affairs), established as one of the three assistant secretary posts authorized by amendments to the National Security Act (P.L. 81-216, amended 10 August 1949). That post was abolished in 1950, its duties transferred to the Assistant Secretary of Defense (Manpower). In July 1964, the post of Assistant Secretary of Defense (Administration) was established, only to be redesignated in November 1971 as the Deputy Assistant Secretary of Defense (Administration). In May 1988, this office was retitled Director of Administration and Management, per Defense Directive 5105.53.

== Office Holders ==
The table below includes both the various titles of this post over time, as well as all the holders of those offices.

Director of Administration and Management
Name	Tenure	SecDef(s) Served Under	President(s) Served Under
Assistant Secretary of Defense (Administration and Public Affairs)
Paul H. Griffith	September 12, 1949 - November 15, 1950	Louis A. Johnson; George C. Marshall	Harry Truman
Assistant Secretary of Defense (Administration)
Solis Horwitz	July 1, 1964 - January 29, 1969	Robert S. McNamara; Clark M. Clifford; Melvin R. Laird	Lyndon Johnson; Richard Nixon
Robert F. Froehlke	January 30, 1969 - June 30, 1971	Melvin R. Laird	Richard Nixon
David O. Cooke (Acting)	June 30, 1971 - November 3, 1971	Melvin R. Laird	Richard Nixon
Deputy Assistant Secretary of Defense (Administration)
David O. Cooke	November 4, 1971 - May 23, 1988	Melvin R. Laird; Elliot L. Richardson; James R. Schlesinger; Donald H. Rumsfeld; Harold Brown; Caspar W. Weinberger; Frank C. Carlucci III	Richard Nixon; Gerald Ford; Jimmy Carter; Ronald Reagan
Director of Administration and Management
David O. Cooke	May 24, 1988 - June 22, 2002	Frank C. Carlucci III; William H. Taft IV (Acting); Richard B. Cheney; Leslie Aspin, Jr. William J. Perry; William S. Cohen; Donald H. Rumsfeld	Ronald Reagan; George H. W. Bush; Bill Clinton; George W. Bush
Raymond F. DuBois, Jr.	October 1, 2002 - June 17, 2003 (Assumed Duties); June 18, 2003 - May 2005	Donald H. Rumsfeld	George W. Bush
Michael B. Donley	May 9, 2005 - June 20, 2008	Donald H. Rumsfeld; Robert M. Gates	George W. Bush
Michael L. Rhodes	June 21, 2008 - March 24, 2010 (Acting); March 25, 2010 - January 24, 2019	Robert M. Gates; Leon Panetta; Chuck Hagel; Ash Carter; Jim Mattis; Patrick M. Shanahan (Acting)	George W. Bush; Barack Obama; Donald Trump
Thomas M. Muir	January 11, 2021 - May 5, 2021 (Acting)	Christopher C. Miller (Acting); Lloyd Austin	Donald Trump; Joe Biden
Michael B. Donley	May 5, 2021 – September 18, 2023	Lloyd Austin	Joe Biden
Jennifer C. Walsh	September 18, 2023 – June 2025	Lloyd Austin Pete Hegseth	Joe Biden Donald Trump
Robert G. Salesses	June 2025 - Present	Pete Hegseth	Donald Trump
