= 2010 Pentagon shooting =

Shooting of two policemen in Virginia, US

Coordinates: 38°52′9.3″N 77°3′13.5″W

- Location: Arlington, Virginia, US
- Date: March 4, 2010 c. 6:40 p.m. (EST)
- Attack type: Shooting
- Weapons: Ruger 9mm semi-automatic pistol; Taurus 9mm semi-automatic pistol
- Deaths: 1 (the perpetrator)
- Injuries: 2
- Perpetrator: John Patrick Bedell

On March 4, 2010, John Patrick Bedell shot and wounded two Pentagon police officers at a security checkpoint in the Pentagon station of the Washington Metro transit system in Arlington County, Virginia, just outside Washington, DC, United States. The officers returned fire, striking him in the head. Bedell was killed.

== Shooting ==
The suit-clad gunman was wounded after firing upon and injuring two Pentagon police officers. The shooting occurred around 6:40 p.m. outside the Metro station entrance. As he neared the security checkpoint, Bedell reportedly appeared to be "pretty calm". When the officers asked for his credentials, "he drew a weapon from his pocket and started shooting". Joined by a third officer who came to their aid, the police defended themselves and returned fire, mortally wounding their attacker.

The conflict was over in less than a minute. According to Chief Richard Keevill of the Pentagon Force Protection Agency, Bedell was armed with two 9mm semiautomatic pistols and had several loaded magazines. Authorities found more ammunition in his car, parked in a nearby parking garage.

Bedell and the injured officers were transported to George Washington University Hospital by units of the Arlington County Fire Department. The two injured officers, Jeffrey Amos and Marvin Carraway, were soon released from the hospital. One had a thigh wound, and the other had a shoulder wound. Both injuries were superficial.

== Response ==
All of the Pentagon's entrances were secured after the attack except the one leading from the Metro. All were reopened according to Pentagon spokesman Bryan Whitman. The Metro station had also been reopened by 8:00 p.m. except the entrance nearest the area of the shooting. Whitman said the subway entrance was likely to remain closed overnight.

The subway station is adjacent to the Pentagon. It was redesigned after the September 11 terrorist attacks; commuters are no longer allowed to go directly into the building. Instead they must ride an escalator to the surface and pass through a security check outside the building's doors.

== Perpetrator ==
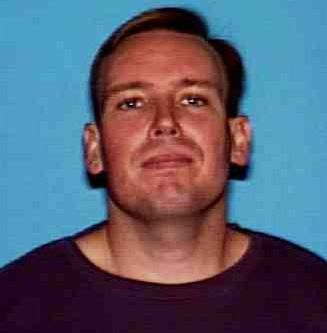
Bedell

John Patrick Bedell (May 20, 1973 – March 5, 2010) was a computer programmer and engineering student from Hollister, California. He had bipolar disorder and had been institutionalized several times, according to a 2006 Orange County court filing regarding an arrest for marijuana possession. It is unclear how or if the bipolar disorder affected his behavior in this matter.

He graduated from University of California, Santa Cruz in 1994 with an undergraduate degree in physics. He also attended San Jose State University (SJSU) in 1995–1996, studying biochemistry. He returned to SJSU in 2009 for a graduate electrical engineering program, where he was described as "one of the best circuit design students" in the class by a former professor.

=== Political views ===
The Christian Science Monitor noted Bedell was an "anti-Bush registered Democrat who believed 9/11 was planned and carried out by the US government", but argued it would nevertheless be "facile" to call him left-wing. The Monitor instead grouped Bedell with "non-partisan" or "post-partisan" anti-government extremists such as Joseph Andrew Stack and the Ku Klux Klan.

A blog on Blogspot named Rothbardix appears to be authored by Bedell. The title of the blog probably represents a reference to anarcho-capitalist Murray Rothbard. The blog details many libertarian beliefs, including: "The most basic principle of economic justice is the protection of private property and the protection of the right to freely exchange that property. Modern governments, however, consistently and routinely violate the rights of property owners ...".

Bedell also seems to suggest the United States government is controlled by an elite group of people. In the final paragraph of his last blog post, he wrote: "The blatant violations of the Constitution's limitations on the economic role of the government, accomplished through many subtle usurpations over many decades, are perhaps even more pernicious than, and are certainly a key motivation for, the violent seizure of the United States government."

The anti-government views on Bedell's blog are also buttressed by his Facebook page, since deleted but image captured, where he associated himself as a fan of the libertarian Ludwig von Mises Institute, Lew Rockwell, and Shelly Roche (a self-described libertarian).

Bedell posted a proposal on Google Code for an "open insurgent project" that would "integrate existing open-source codebases and new development to create an MMORPG simulation of low-cost defenses against futuristic, modern, and historical military opponents using a wide range of simulated defensive responses with real world systems". He also created a Linux distribution called Rothbardix.

On March 5, 2010, media reports said that Bedell may have harbored entrenched bitterness towards the US Armed Forces and that he had doubts about the official story of the September 11 attacks. He has also been described as a "follower of the 9/11 truth movement".

In 2006, he was arrested for openly growing cannabis on his balcony, which he explained in a podcast was due to his "belief that cannabis prohibition is the least defensible and most unjust aspect of the prohibitionist regime". He refused to cooperate with officers and was carried down the apartment stairs to a patrol car. He mentioned on his blog, Rothbardix, his arrest and subsequent dealings with law enforcement officials resulting from his arrest on marijuana charges and obstructing an officer. Bedell was described as motivated by a hatred of the federal government and an expressed desire to expose what he considered an injustice in the case of a military suicide he argued was a coverup.

He apparently wrote on a Wikipedia page that bringing attention to what he felt was military corruption would "see that justice is served in the death of Colonel James Sabow, as a step toward establishing the truth of events such as the September 11 demolitions and institutions such as the coup regime of 1963 that maintains itself in power through the global drug trade, financial corruption, and murder, among other crimes".

Bedell also envisioned a system which required "billions and billions of carefully cultivated, highly valuable cannabis plants growing through the United States with complete security of property". This was to have been the basis for a proposed new monetary system based on the value of a gram of cannabis.

== See also ==
- 2021 Pentagon attack
- CIA headquarters shooting
- List of incidents of political violence in Washington, DC
