= President's Award for Distinguished Federal Civilian Service =

Award bestowed by the President of the United States

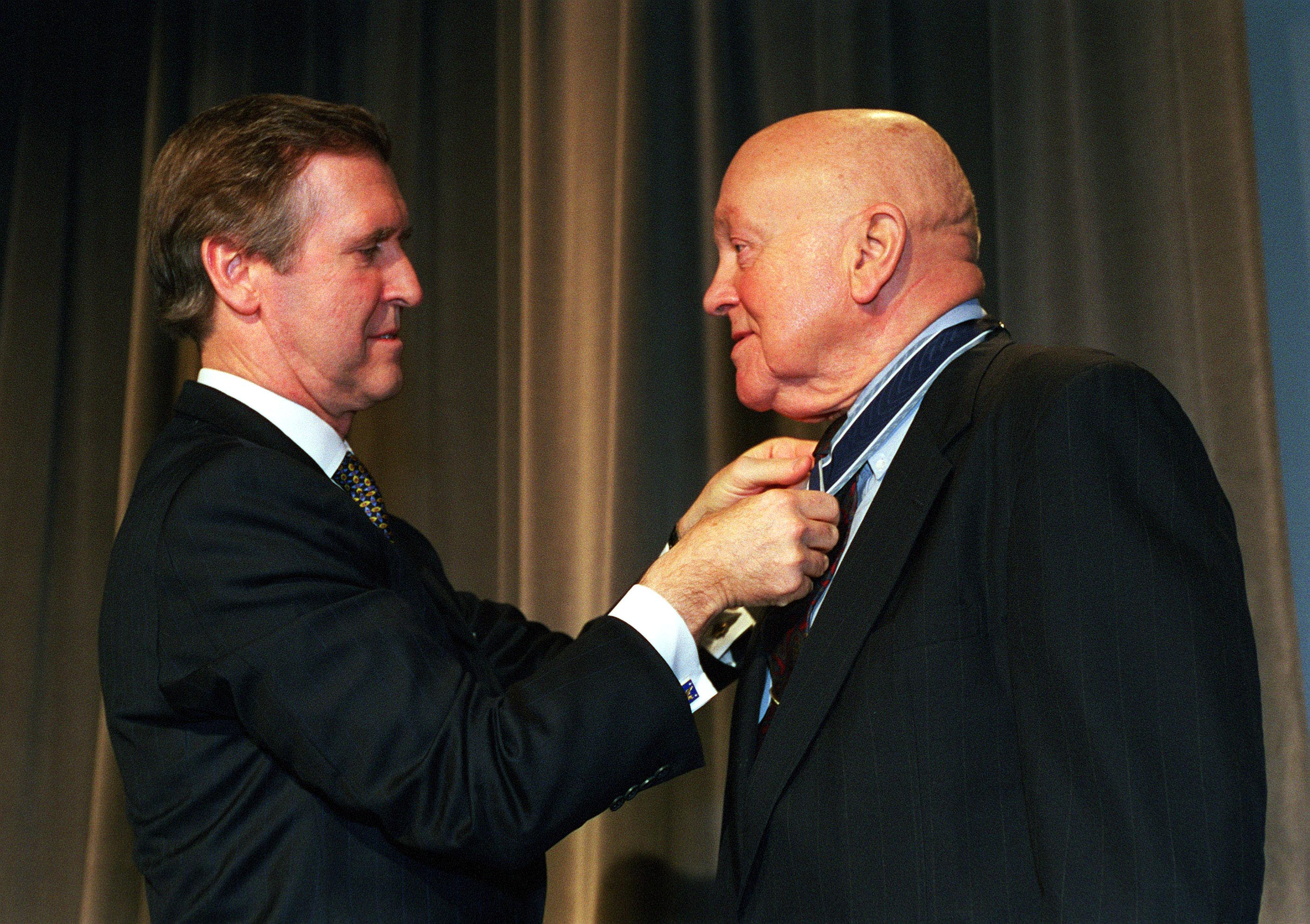
- The Distinguished Federal Civilian Service Medal being awarded to Pentagon administrator David O. Cooke.
- Type: Medal
- Awarded for: "contributions so outstanding that the officer or employee is deserving of greater public recognition than that which can be accorded by the head of the department or agency in which he is employed."
- Presented by: the President of the United States
- Eligibility: Civilian employees of the United States Government
- Status: Active
- Established: 1957
- Ribbon

Precedence
- Next (higher): Public Safety Officer Medal of Valor
- Next (lower): Presidential Award for Excellence in Mathematics and Science Teaching

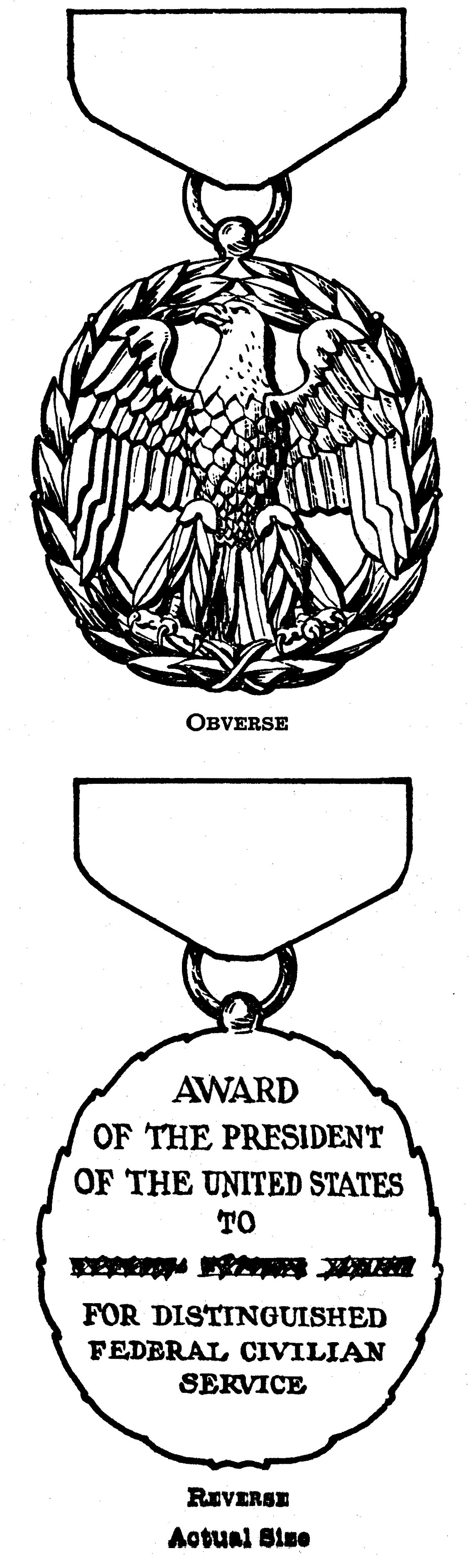
Award design, from Executive Order

Established by President Dwight D. Eisenhower on 27 June 1957 by Executive Order 10717, the President's Award for Distinguished Federal Civilian Service was created to allow the President to recognize civilian officers or employees of the federal government who have made contributions "so outstanding that the officer or employee is deserving of greater public recognition than that which can be accorded by the head of the department or agency in which he is employed."

President John F. Kennedy in Executive Order 10979 directed that potential recipients of the award are recommended to the President by the Distinguished Civilian Service Awards Board, who also had responsibility for recommending people to be awarded the Presidential Medal of Freedom. Executive Order 12014, by Jimmy Carter, abolished the Distinguished Civilian Service Awards Board and turned over the responsibility for recommending recipients to the Chairman of the United States Civil Service Commission. This executive order was subsequently modified again by Jimmy Carter in Executive Order 12107 which named the Director of the Office of Personnel Management as the person responsible for making recommendations to the President.

The President's Award for Distinguished Federal Civilian Service is the highest honorary award that the Federal Government can grant a career civilian employee. President Kennedy limited the award to only five people per year.

== See also ==
- Awards and decorations of the United States government
