= United States Pentagon Police =

Federal police agency of the Office of the US Secretary of Defense

Pentagon Police
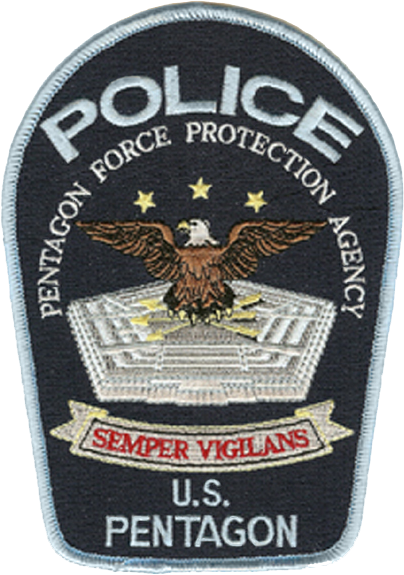

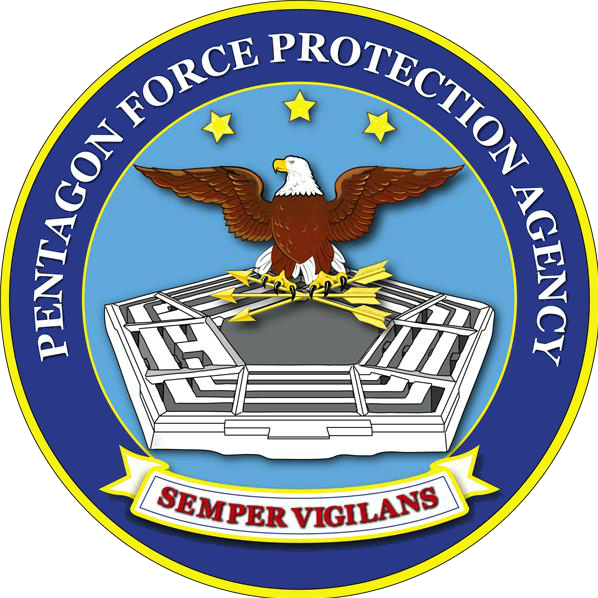
- Seal of the Pentagon Force Protection Agency
- Common name: Pentagon Police or Pentagon P.D.
- Abbreviation: PPD
- Motto: Semper Vigilans (English: "Always watching")

Agency overview
- Formed: October 1, 1987 (as the Defense Protective Service); May 3, 2002 (as the U.S. Pentagon Police)
- Preceding agency: Defense Protective Service

Jurisdictional structure
- Legal jurisdiction: The Pentagon, DoD sites in the National Capital Region

Operational structure
- Headquarters: The Pentagon, Arlington County, Virginia, U.S.
- Elected officers responsible: Chris Bargery, SES, Executive Director for Law Enforcement
- Agency executives: Steven Taylor, Chief of Police; Gerald Plummer, Assistant Chief of Police
- Parent agency: Pentagon Force Protection Agency

Website
- www.pfpa.mil

The Pentagon Police Division (PPD) is the uniformed division of the Pentagon Force Protection Agency (PFPA).

PPD's role is to provide law enforcement and protective security services for the Pentagon and other Office of the Secretary of Defense (OSD) activities in the National Capital Region. These services include patrol, response, and investigation of criminal activity as well as protection of designated Defense officials.

== History ==
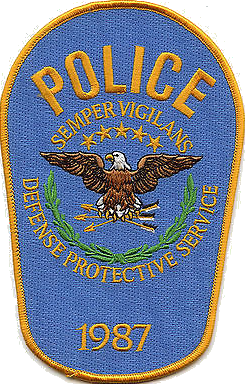
The patch of the Defense Protective Service, the USPPD's predecessor organization.

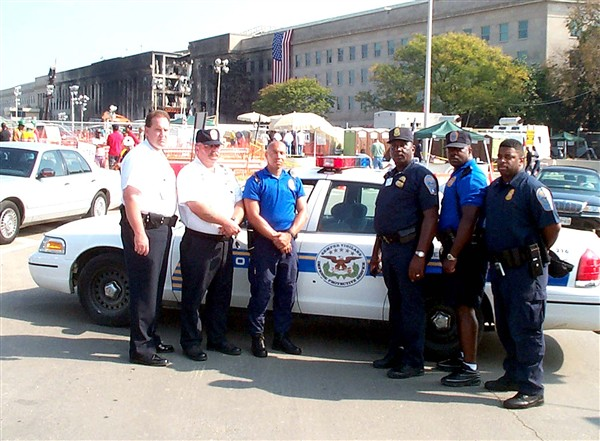
Defense Protective Service officers at the Pentagon in September 2001.

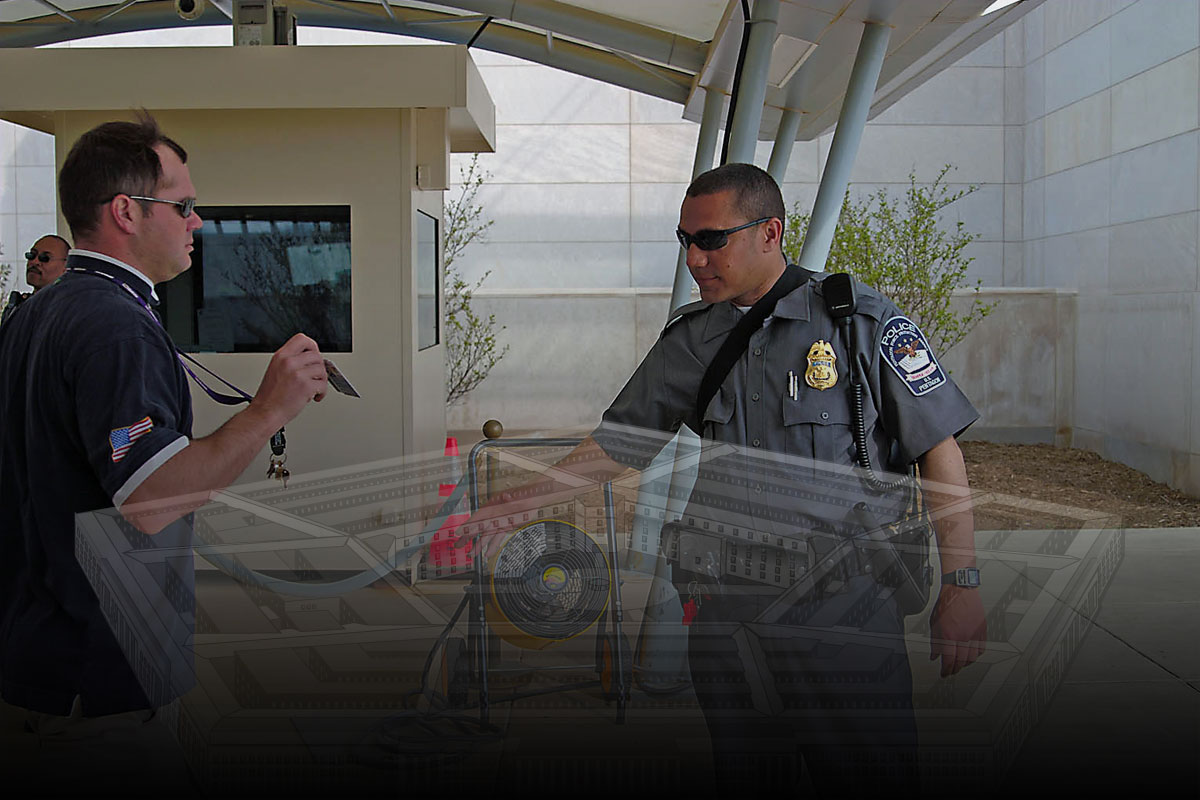
A USPPD policeman checks a man's identification card at the Pentagon in the early 2010s.

Prior to 1971, the General Service Administration's (GSA) United States Special Police (USSP) conducted law enforcement, safety and security functions at the Pentagon. The protection programs were primarily a "guard-watchman" operation, where USSP were primarily concerned with the protection of property. However, in response to a growing number of disruptive incidents throughout the country affecting federal facilities under GSA control, attention to the security program had to be re-examined. As a result of mass demonstrations, bombings and bomb threats within the country and region, the Federal Protective Service (FPS) was established and the comprehensive protection of Pentagon personnel rather than the previous policy of concentration on property were developed.

On October 1, 1987, the GSA Administrator delegated authority for protecting the Pentagon Reservation to the Department of Defense (DoD). In order to carry out the new mission, DoD established the Defense Protective Service (DPS) as a new organization within the Washington Headquarters Service (WHS).

Formerly known as the Defense Protective Service (DPS) until 2002, the Pentagon Police has exclusive jurisdiction within the Pentagon Reservation and has concurrent jurisdiction with other law enforcement agencies (federal, state, and local) in an area of approximately 275 acres (1.11 km^{2}) around the complex. Pentagon Police officers also have jurisdiction at Department of Defense leased property throughout the National Capital Region, and at the US Military Court of Appeals in Washington, D.C. Additionally, they are charged with the protection of various Department of Defense executive officers. Through a memorandum of understanding (MOU) with Arlington County, Pentagon Police also possess conditional police authority throughout Arlington County.

On March 4, 2010, a gunman, identified as John Patrick Bedell, who espoused anti-government views, shot and wounded two officers at a security checkpoint in the Pentagon Metro station. The officers returned fire, striking him in the head. He died a few hours later the following day.

Most people arrested by the Pentagon Police are for driving under intoxication violations.

== Recruitment ==
Officers (0083) and Agents (1811) of the Pentagon Force Protection Agency are federal officers, appointed under 10 U.S.C. Title 10 §2674 of the United States Code and possess federal authority, as authorized by Section 2674. They receive basic and advanced law enforcement training at the Federal Law Enforcement Training Centers location in Glynco, Georgia.

The Pentagon Police Division has an assortment of career specialties including: Emergency Response Team, K-9, Mobile Patrol, Protective Services Unit, Evidence and Court Liaison, and Recruiting Division. As of April 2015 the Motorcycle Unit was disbanded.

== Units ==
=== Pentagon Force Protection Agency Criminal Investigations & Office of Professional Responsibility Directorate ===
The mission of the PFPA Criminal Investigation and Office of Professional Responsibility is to investigate criminal acts occurring within the Pentagon and certain other designated DoD buildings, both U.S. Government owned and leased located within the National Capital Region (NCR). The CI/OPR is the investigative arm of the PFPA and as such, is responsible to respond to and investigate mainly felony offenses committed in the mentioned area of responsibility.

PFPA CI/OPR has three distinct investigative missions:

- Criminal Investigations
- Internal Investigations, and
- Special Crimes Unit

PFPA CI/OPR personnel are series 1811 (Criminal Investigators). They are trained in the full spectrum of criminal investigation matters, including forensic topics such as crime scene processing, interview/interrogation, crime scene photography, and surveillance, among others. The Investigators routinely receive specialized and the most up-to-date forensic and interview/interrogation training, usually conducted at the Federal Law Enforcement Training Centers (FLETC) and from military, state, and local courses.

PFPA Criminal Investigators are responsible for investigating violations of Title 18 United States Code, Title 21 United States Code as it pertains to Drug Enforcement, Code of Federal Regulations 32, Section 40b as it pertains to conduct on the Pentagon reservation, and Code of Federal Regulations 41 as it pertains to conduct in locations under the purview of the Department of Defense. Investigators are also required to have a working knowledge of the Criminal Code of the Commonwealth of Virginia, the Criminal Code of the State of Maryland, and the Criminal Code of the District of Columbia since their investigations may require Investigators to obtain arrest and/or search and seizure warrants in those jurisdictions. Likewise a close working relationship with the U.S. Attorney's office and/or state and local prosecutors is required in order to prepare investigative reports, testify before grand juries, in Federal, military, state or local court in order to achieve a successful prosecution.

PFPA CI/OPR routinely works closely with federal, military, state and local law enforcement agencies including the Federal Bureau of Investigation, the United States Secret Service, and the individual service investigative activities. The Internal Affairs section investigates allegations within PFPA of criminal and administrative nature involving PFPA members.

=== Special Operations Division K-9 Unit ===
The K-9 Unit is the explosive detection unit for the Department of Defense community in and around the Washington D.C. area. The K-9 Unit is organized into several teams (canine and handler) that provide both proactive and reactive law enforcement functions in order to ensure a safe working environment at the Pentagon Reservation and its other associated properties.

Personnel of the PPD Special Operations K-9 Unit ae tasked with maintaining operational readiness for immediate deployment. Assigned canines cohabitate with their respective handlers and are integrated into their daily domestic routines. This cohabitation is intended to reinforce handler-canine rapport, and to minimize response times to incidents requiring K-9 intervention.

=== Pentagon Force Protection Agency Protective Services Division ===
Dignitary protection is not unique in today's federal police agencies. Across the country, police departments often provide dignitary protection for their leaders and other high ranking or influential people. The Pentagon Force Protection Agency (PFPA) is no different. The mission of the PSU is to protect principals from harm or embarrassment and to expedite their movements when necessary. In achieving their goals, PSU personnel must be highly trained and experts in numerous law enforcement skills in order to provide a premier security posture for, and according to specification of the individual principal's needs. An additional function of the PSU is to support the coordination of special events that take place in, and around the Pentagon Reservation. The PSU serves as the single point of contact for PPD on all ceremonies in honor of visiting dignitaries hosted by the Office of Secretary of Defense and the Chairman of the Joint Chiefs of Staff. Various protocol offices such as the Joint Chiefs of Staff, Office of the Secretary of Defense and the Office of Defense Foreign Affairs utilize PSU officers to assist their organization and ensure their events operate as smoothly as possible.

Quality public relations skills are critical for the PSU. For PSU personnel, strong diplomatic skills and the ability to effectively operate in high-pressure situations are extremely important.

== Fallen officers ==
Since the establishment of the Pentagon Force Protection Agency, Pentagon Police Division, two officers have died in the line of duty.

Officer	Date of death	Details
Police Officer James Melvin Feltis III	Monday, February 14, 2005	Vehicular assault
Corporal George Gonzalez	Tuesday, August 3, 2021	Stabbing

== See also ==
- Protective Services Battalion
- List of United States federal law enforcement agencies
- U.S. Defense Department firefighters
