= Distinguished Civilian Service Awards Board =

Former United States governmental board

The Distinguished Civilian Service Awards Board was a board created for recommending civilians for awards from the U.S. Federal government for distinguished service. It was originally established by President Dwight D. Eisenhower on June 27, 1957, by Executive Order 10717 to recommend to the president people in the U.S. Civil Service to receive the President's Award for Distinguished Federal Civilian Service. Its mandate was expanded via Executive Order 11085 by President John F. Kennedy on February 22, 1963, so that the board would recommend to the president people to be awarded the Presidential Medal of Freedom.

Jimmy Carter abolished the Distinguished Civilian Service Awards Board in Executive Order 12014 and turned over the responsibility for recommending recipients to the Chairman of the United States Civil Service Commission. This executive order was subsequently modified again by Jimmy Carter in Executive Order 12107 which named the Director of the Office of Personnel Management as the person responsible for making recommendations to the president.

The Director of the Office of Personnel Management, under the authority of Executive Order 12107, has established the Presidential Rank Award Distinguished Review Board.

Additionally, the president can confer the award on persons not nominated by anyone; however, normally, each component of the Department of Defense will nominate recipients through the secretary and the Public Service Awards Panel.
