= Secretary of Defense Exceptional Civilian Service Award =

Civilian career award given out by the Office of the Secretary of Defense

Office of the Secretary of Defense Exceptional Civilian Service Award
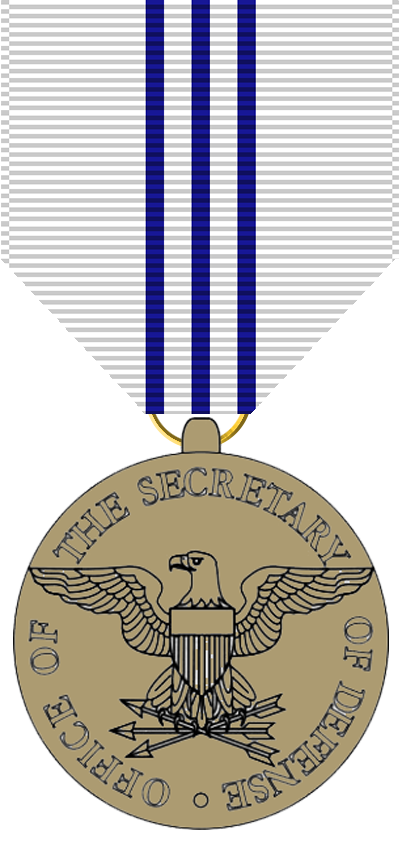
- Type: Civilian Medal
- Awarded for: Exceptional service to the Department of Defense
- Country: United States
- Presented by: Office of the Secretary of Defense
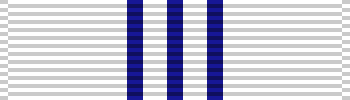
- Ribbon

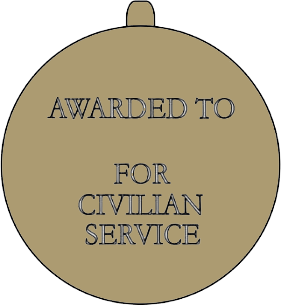
- Reverse

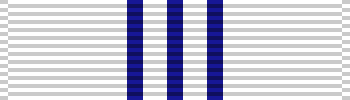
- Ribbon with second award device

Precedence
- Next (lower): Office of the Secretary of Defense Civilian Career Service Award

The Office of the Secretary of Defense Medal for Exceptional Civilian Service is the United States Office of the Secretary of Defense’s (OSD) highest level career medaled award.

Career civilian employees of the OSD, the Department of Defense, and the Federal government are eligible.

== Approval ==
Approval must be granted from the Head of an OSD Component (e.g., the Secretary of Defense and the Deputy Secretary of Defense; the Under Secretaries of Defense; or one of the Assistant Secretaries of Defense who report directly to the Secretary of Defense, etc.)

This award was established to recognize civilian employees who have distinguished themselves by exceptional service to the Secretary of Defense or a Component within the Office of the Secretary of Defense. This award consists of a medal, lapel pin, and citation signed by the Secretary or Head of an OSD Component. Subsequent awards consist of the foregoing recognition devices and a bronze, silver, or gold palm, as appropriate.

Nominees shall have served a minimum of three (3) years in an organization receiving operational support from the Washington Headquarters Services' Directorate for Personnel and Security Customer Support Operating Office or in the Joint Staff, or a combination of the two.

== For non DOD employees ==
In lieu of this award, Department of Defense Medal for Distinguished Public Service is presented to those 'non-career civilian employees, private citizens, and foreign nationals', for their contributions, assistance, or support who do not derive his or her principal livelihood from U.S. Government employment. It is OSD's highest level non-career medaled award.

== Award Criteria ==
Performance is characterized by exceptional civilian service to OSD as a whole or the specific OSD Component.

== See also ==
- Awards and decorations of the United States government
- Office of the Secretary of Defense Medal for Exceptional Public Service
