= Office of the Secretary of Defense Medal for Exceptional Public Service =

Award of the US Dept of Defense

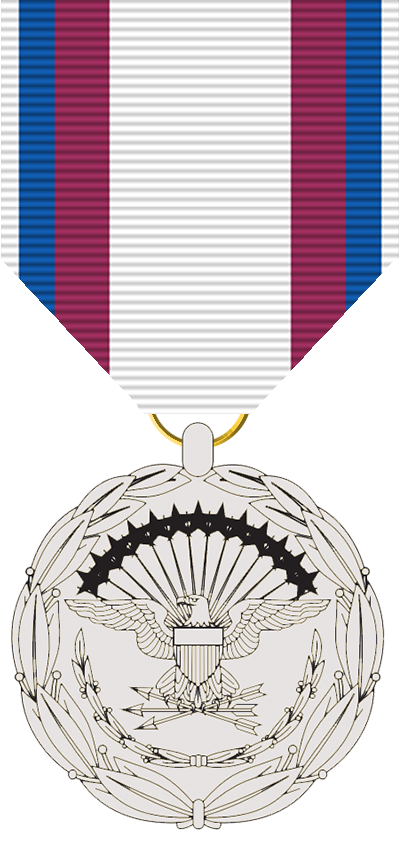
- Type: Civilian public service award
- Awarded for: "In recognition of the contributions, assistance, or support to Department of Defense components”
- Country: United States
- Presented by: Secretary of Defense
- Eligibility: Non-career Federal employees, private citizens, and foreign nationals.
- Ribbon

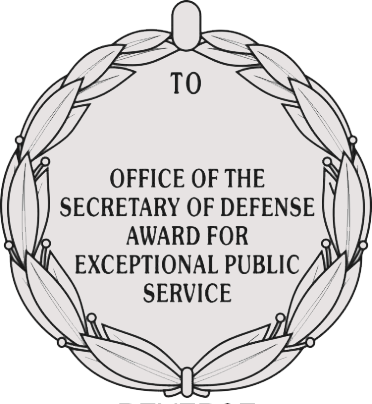
- Reverse
- Status: Currently awarded

Precedence
- Next (higher): Secretary of Defense Medal for Outstanding Public Service
- Next (lower): Office of the Secretary of Defense Award for Outstanding Achievement

The Office of the Secretary of Defense Medal for Exceptional Public Service is the third highest award presented by the Secretary of Defense to non-career Federal employees, private citizens, and foreign nationals for contributions, assistance, or support to Department of Defense functions that are extensive enough to warrant recognition, but are lesser in scope and impact than is required for the DoD Medal for Outstanding Public Service. A component head of the Department of Defense is the approval authority. This award consists of a silver medal, a miniature medal, a rosette, and a citation signed by the Secretary of Defense. An individual may receive this award more than once. Subsequent awards consist of the foregoing recognition devices and a bronze, silver, or gold palm, as appropriate.

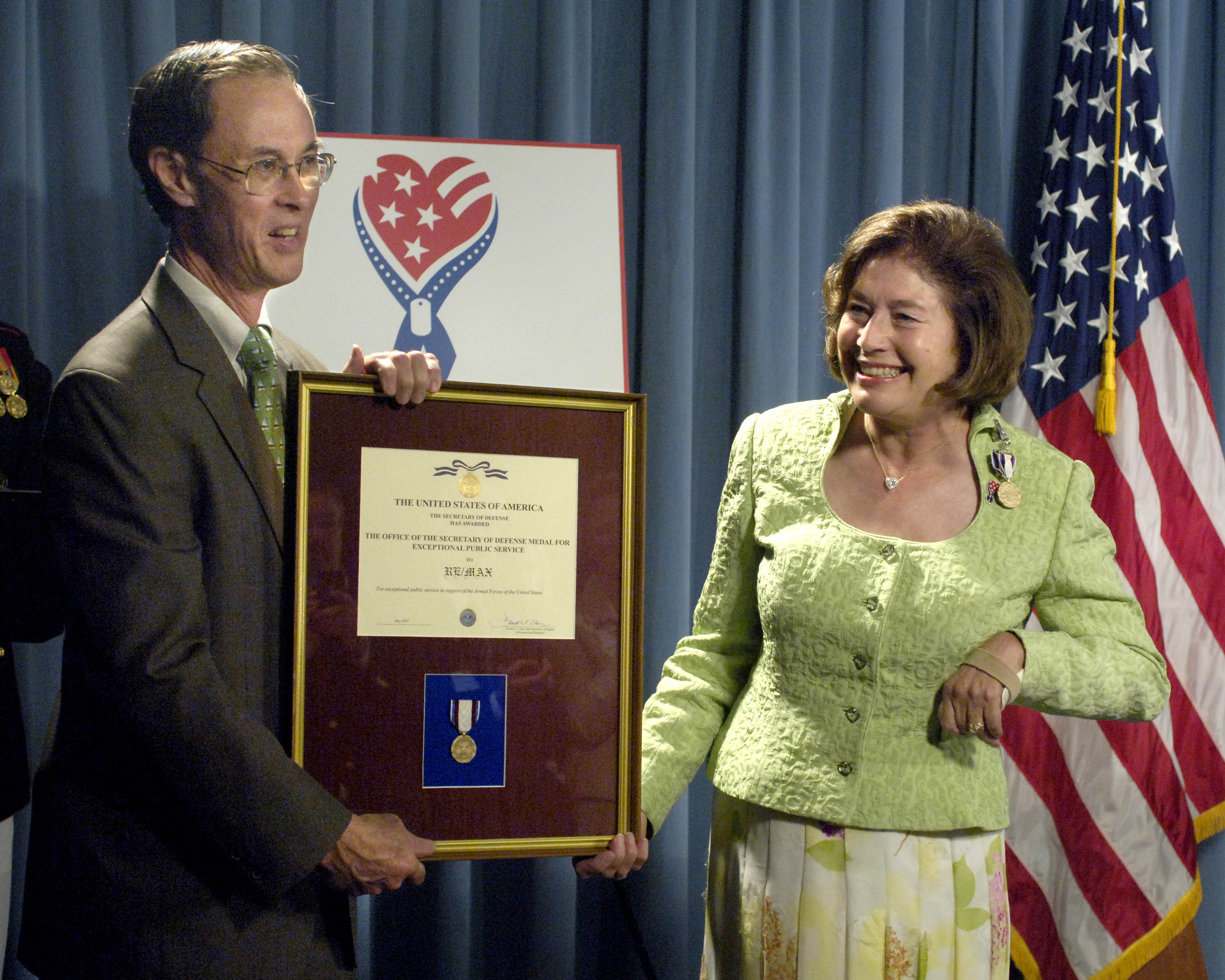
Under Secretary of Defense David Chu presents the Exceptional Public Service Award to Gail Liniger in 2007.

== See also ==
- Secretary of Defense Exceptional Civilian Service Award
- Awards and decorations of the United States government
