= Raymond F. DuBois =

American security consultant

Raymond Francis DuBois Jr. (born June 5, 1947 in Washington D.C.) is a private consultant in national security and defense policy and also a senior adviser at the Center for Strategic and International Studies, a nonpartisan think-tank in Washington, D.C. At CSIS he focuses on international security policy, civil-military relations, defense management reform, and Joint Professional Military Education. His expertise is in Defense Department organization, management and reform; land forces tactical and non-tactical systems; international and domestic installations and environmental issues; base realignment and closure; National Guard and Reserves issues; stability operations and reconstruction; continuity of business operations and crisis management. He was a member of the Defense Health Board and its NCR BRAC Health Systems Advisory Committee in 2006 to 2009. DuBois was a member of the Bipartisan Policy Center’s Commission on Stabilizing Fragile States. He is a member of the International Advisory Council of the United States Institute of Peace, a member of the Princeton University ROTC Board of Directors. He has spoken at the Maxwell School of Syracuse University, at the European Forum Alpbach 2008 in Austria, at the Marine Corps University, Quantico, Virginia, and before audiences of the National Defense Industry Association and the Association of the United States Army.

== Background ==
DuBois is the son of Annabella Walling DuBois and Raymond F. DuBois (Rear Admiral U.S. Navy). After growing up in Washington and New London, Connecticut, he attended the Pine Point School in Stonington, CT and The Taft School in Watertown, CT. DuBois served in the U.S. Army from 1967 to 1969, including nearly 13 months in the central highlands of Vietnam as a combat intelligence operations sergeant. He received a Bachelor of Arts degree in Politics from Princeton University in 1972. At Princeton, DuBois was a three-year letterman on the varsity lacrosse team, and was a member of the University Cottage Club. Upon graduation, he moved to New York City to pursue a career in finance at Smith Barney & Co. A year later, however, he received a rare opportunity to work for Dr. James Schlesinger, the newly appointed Secretary of Defense, as his Staff Assistant. In 1977, DuBois resigned as the Deputy Under Secretary of the Army and then was in the private sector for 23 years, living and working in Mexico City, Brussels, London, New York, and Washington D.C., until he returned to public service in 2001. In 1992, DuBois married the former Helen Rutherford Runnells. They currently live in Washington, D.C. and have two children: Lionel Pierre DuBois II (b. 1993) and Mary Chester DuBois (b. 1995).

== Career ==
He served as the acting Under Secretary of the Army from February 2005 to February 2006. Prior to that, from October 2002 to May 2005, he was Director of Administration and Management and principal staff assistant to Defense Secretary Donald Rumsfeld on all manpower, real estate, and organizational planning for the Office of the Secretary of Defense. Concurrently, he was the Director of Washington Headquarters Services, where, as “Mayor of the Pentagon”, he directly managed 2,500 employees and a $1.3 billion budget, the 800 person Pentagon Force Protection Agency and the $5.5 billion Pentagon Renovation Program. From April 2001 through November 2004, DuBois served as the Deputy Under Secretary of Defense for Installations and Environment during which time he managed the “Base Realignment and Closure” Program and established policy for the $660 billion worldwide inventory of installations, ranges, housing, utilities, energy and environmental programs. He was president of Potomac Strategies International LLC from 1995 to 2000, providing strategic management, marketing and financial support to companies in the aerospace, electronics, telecommunications, and telemedicine industries. From 1990 to 1995, he worked for the Digital Equipment Corporation as director of strategic plans and policies of the Aerospace, Defense Electronics, and Government Group and was later worldwide marketing director for the Defense Industries Group.

== Honors and awards ==
DuBois is the recipient of the Department of Defense Medal for Distinguished Public Service, the Army Civilian Distinguished Public Service Award (twice), the Navy Distinguished Public Service Award, the Department of the Air Force Decoration for Exceptional Civilian Service, and the Army Commander's Award for Public Service. He also received the Army Commendation Medal for his service in Vietnam.

== Opposition to Donald Trump ==
In 2020, DuBois, along with over 130 other former Republican national security officials, signed a statement that asserted that President Trump was unfit to serve another term, and "To that end, we are firmly convinced that it is in the best interest of our nation that Vice President Joe Biden be elected as the next President of the United States, and we will vote for him."
