= Presidential Medal of Freedom =

Joint-highest civilian award of the US

- The award's miniature medal
- Type: Civilian award
- Awarded for: Any reason as determined by the president
- Country: United States
- Presented by: President of the United States
- First award: December 6, 1963

Highlights
- Total recipients: 674 (an average of one per month since 1963)
- Service ribbons of the award (at left: Medal with Distinction)

Precedence
- Next (higher): Presidential Medal of Freedom With Distinction
- Equivalent: Congressional Gold Medal
- Next (lower): Presidential Citizens Medal

The Presidential Medal of Freedom is the joint-highest civilian award of the United States, alongside the Congressional Gold Medal. It is an award bestowed by decision of the president of the United States to "any person recommended to the President for award of the Medal or any person selected by the President upon his own initiative", and was created to recognize people who have made "an especially meritorious contribution to

1. the security or national interests of the United States, or
2. world peace, or
3. cultural or other significant public or private endeavors."

The award is not limited to U.S. citizens, and, while it is a civilian award, it can also be awarded to military personnel and worn on the uniform. It was established in 1963 by President John F. Kennedy, superseding the Medal of Freedom that was established by President Harry S. Truman in 1945 to honor civilian service.

Occasionally, the medal award is further denoted as "with distinction." There are no specific criteria for receiving the award with distinction; Executive Order 11085 simply specifies that the award should come in two degrees, and hence any decision to award the higher degree is entirely at the discretion of the president. In 2017, President Barack Obama stated that receiving the award with distinction indicates "an additional level of veneration" in a class of individuals already held in the highest esteem. As of June 2024, the medal had been awarded with distinction at least 55 times, amounting to approximately 8% of all awards. A total of 674 awards have been given.

The Presidential Medal of Freedom is the supreme civilian decoration that can be awarded in discretion of the president, whereas its predecessor, the Medal of Freedom, was inferior in precedence to the Medal for Merit; the Medal of Freedom was awarded by any of three Cabinet secretaries, whereas the Medal for Merit was awarded by the president, as is the Presidential Medal of Freedom.

== Overview ==
President John F. Kennedy established the presidential version of the decoration in 1963 through Executive Order 11085 (signed February 22, 1963), with unique and distinctive insignia, vastly expanded purpose, and far higher prestige. It was the first U.S. civilian neck decoration and, if awarded with Distinction, is the only U.S. sash and star decoration (the Chief Commander degree of the Legion of Merit—which may be awarded to foreign heads of state only—is a star decoration but without a sash). The executive order calls for the medal to be awarded annually on or around July 4, and at other convenient times as chosen by the president, but it has not been awarded every year (e.g., 2001, 2010). The recipient selection process is not made public, but the Trump administration stated that it included recommendations and nominations from the public, Cabinet, White House senior staff, and other presidential advisory bodies, which were then vetted prior to presentation to the President. The order establishing the medal also expanded the size and the responsibilities of the Distinguished Civilian Service Awards Board so it could serve as a major source of such recommendations.

The medal may be awarded to an individual more than once. Colin Powell received two awards, his second being with Distinction; Ellsworth Bunker received both of his awards with Distinction. It may also be awarded posthumously; examples include John F. Kennedy, Steve Jobs, Pope John XXIII, Lyndon Johnson, Sally Ride, John Wayne, Paul "Bear" Bryant, Thurgood Marshall, Cesar Chavez, Walter Reuther, Roberto Clemente, Jack Kemp, Harvey Milk, James Chaney, Andrew Goodman, Michael Schwerner, Elouise Cobell, Grace Hopper, Charlie Kirk, Antonin Scalia, Elvis Presley and Babe Ruth. Chaney, Goodman, and Schwerner, civil rights workers murdered in 1964, were awarded their medals by President Obama 50 years later.

In 1970, President Richard Nixon awarded the medal to the entire Apollo 13 mission operations team, as well as to the mission's crew.

Athlete and activist Simone Biles is the youngest person to receive this award at the age of 25.

== Insignia ==
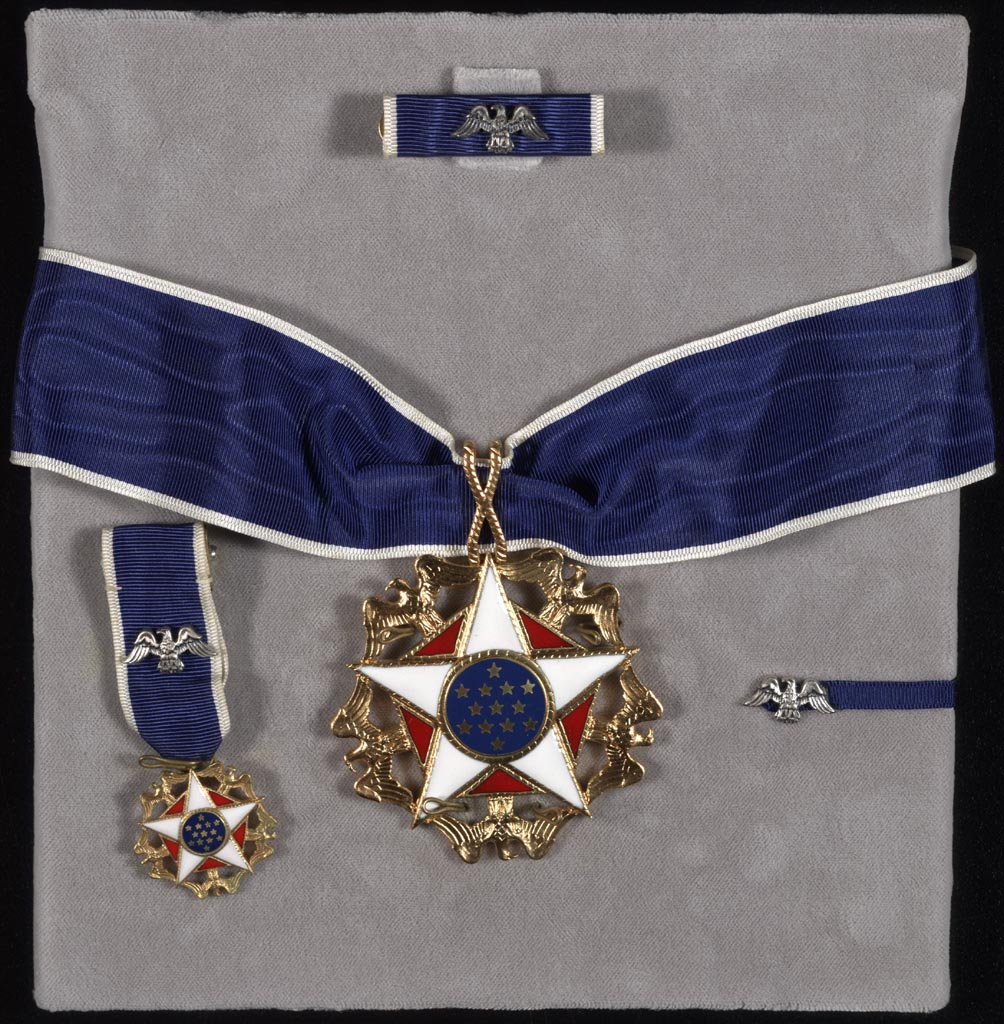
Medal and accoutrements, including the service ribbon, miniature and lapel badge

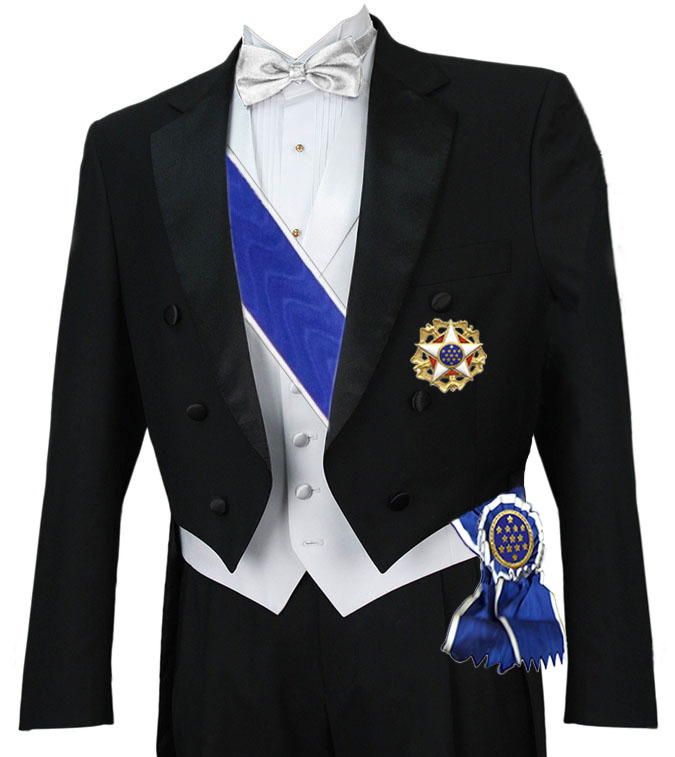
The Presidential Medal of Freedom with Distinction, as worn with white tie

The badge of the Presidential Medal of Freedom is in the form of a golden star with white enamel, with a red enamel pentagon behind it; the central disc bears thirteen gold stars on a blue enamel background (taken from the Great Seal of the United States) within a golden ring. Golden bald eagles with spread wings stand between the points of the star. It is worn around the neck on a blue ribbon having white edge stripes. Women may choose to receive the award as a bow worn on the left chest (as for Margaret Thatcher).

A special and rarely granted award, called the Presidential Medal of Freedom with Distinction, has a larger version of the same badge, which is worn as a star on the left chest. It comes with a sash that is worn over the right shoulder (similarly to the Grand Cross of an order of chivalry), with its rosette (blue with a white edge, bearing the central disc of the badge at its center) resting on the left hip. When the medal with Distinction is awarded, the star may be presented hanging from a neck ribbon and can be identified by its size, which is larger than the standard badge.

In addition to the full-size insignia, the award is accompanied by a service ribbon for wear on military service uniforms, a miniature medal pendant for wear on mess dress or civilian formal wear, and a lapel badge for wear on civilian clothes, all of which comes in the full presentation set. There is a silver bald eagle with spread wings on the miniature and service ribbon, or a golden bald eagle for a medal awarded with Distinction.

The Insignia was designed by the Army's Institute of Heraldry, led by Col. Harry Downing Temple.

== Revocation ==
There is no process for the award to be revoked. This issue has been raised regarding certain recipients, in particular regarding the award given to actor and comedian Bill Cosby, following allegations of sexual assault against him.

== Recipients ==
=== Gallery ===
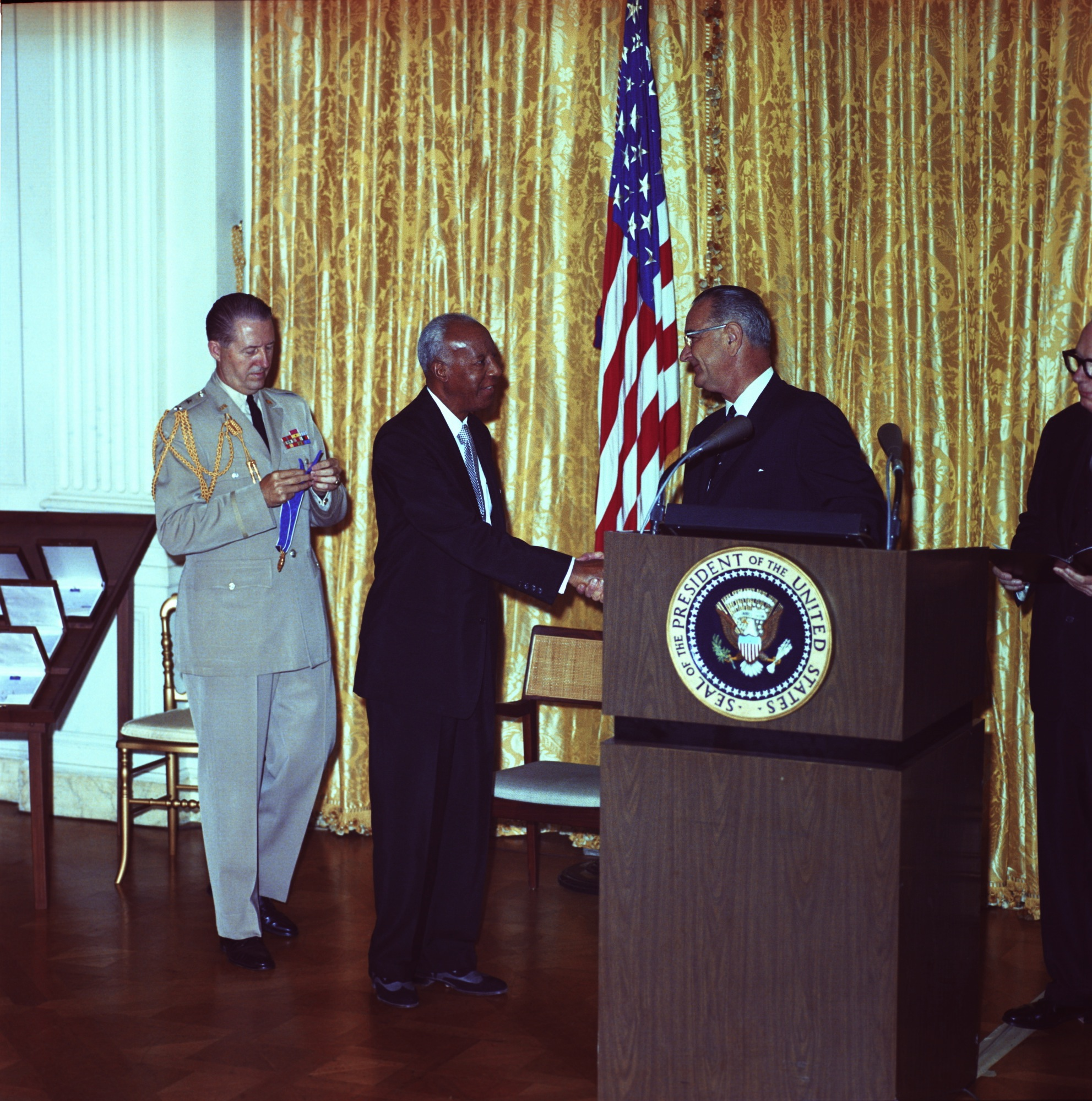
A. Philip Randolph receiving the Medal from President Lyndon Johnson at one of the first ceremonies, 1964

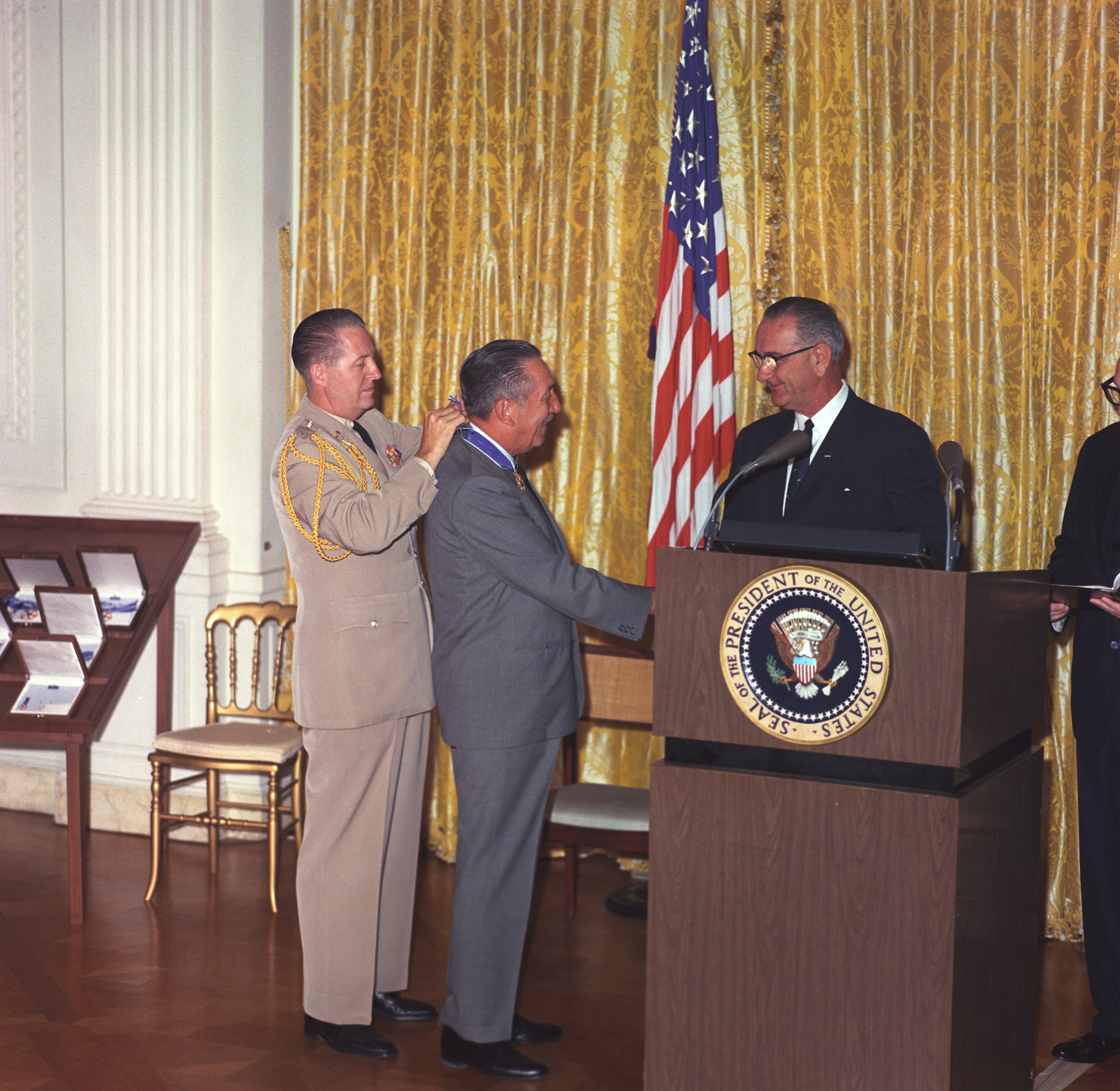
Walt Disney receiving the Presidential Medal of Freedom from President Lyndon B. Johnson, 1964

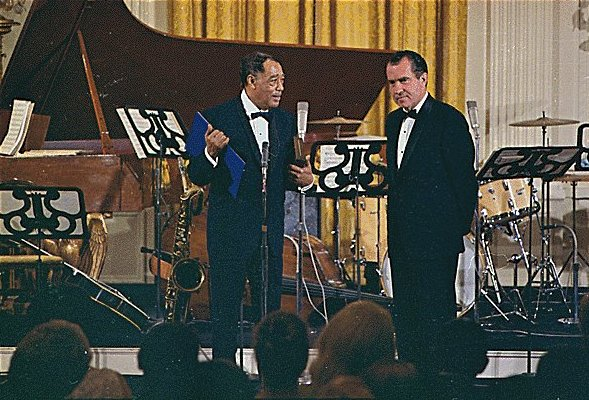
President Richard Nixon presenting the Presidential Medal of Freedom to Duke Ellington, 1969

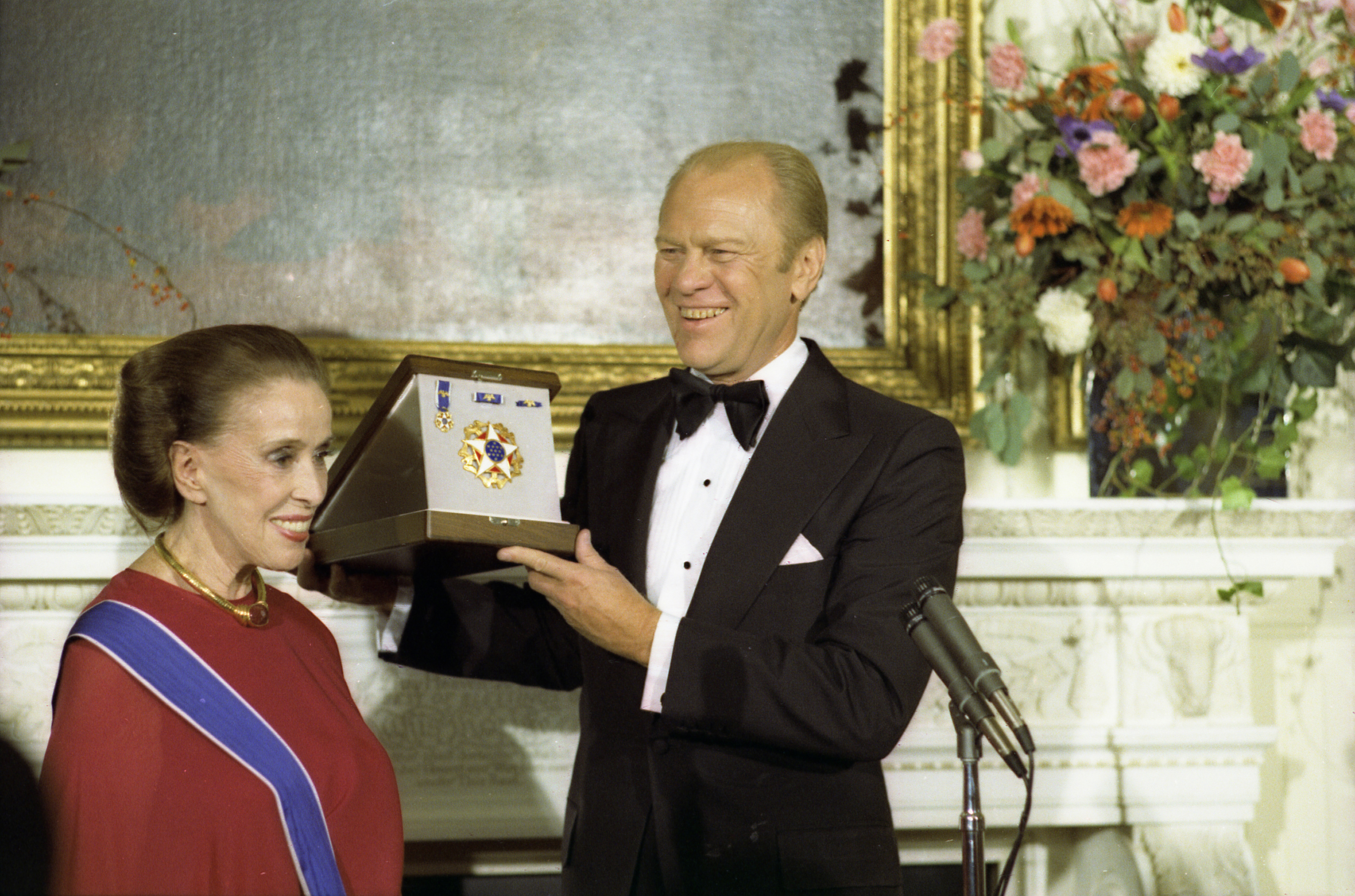
President Gerald Ford awarding the Presidential Medal of Freedom with Distinction to Martha Graham, 1976

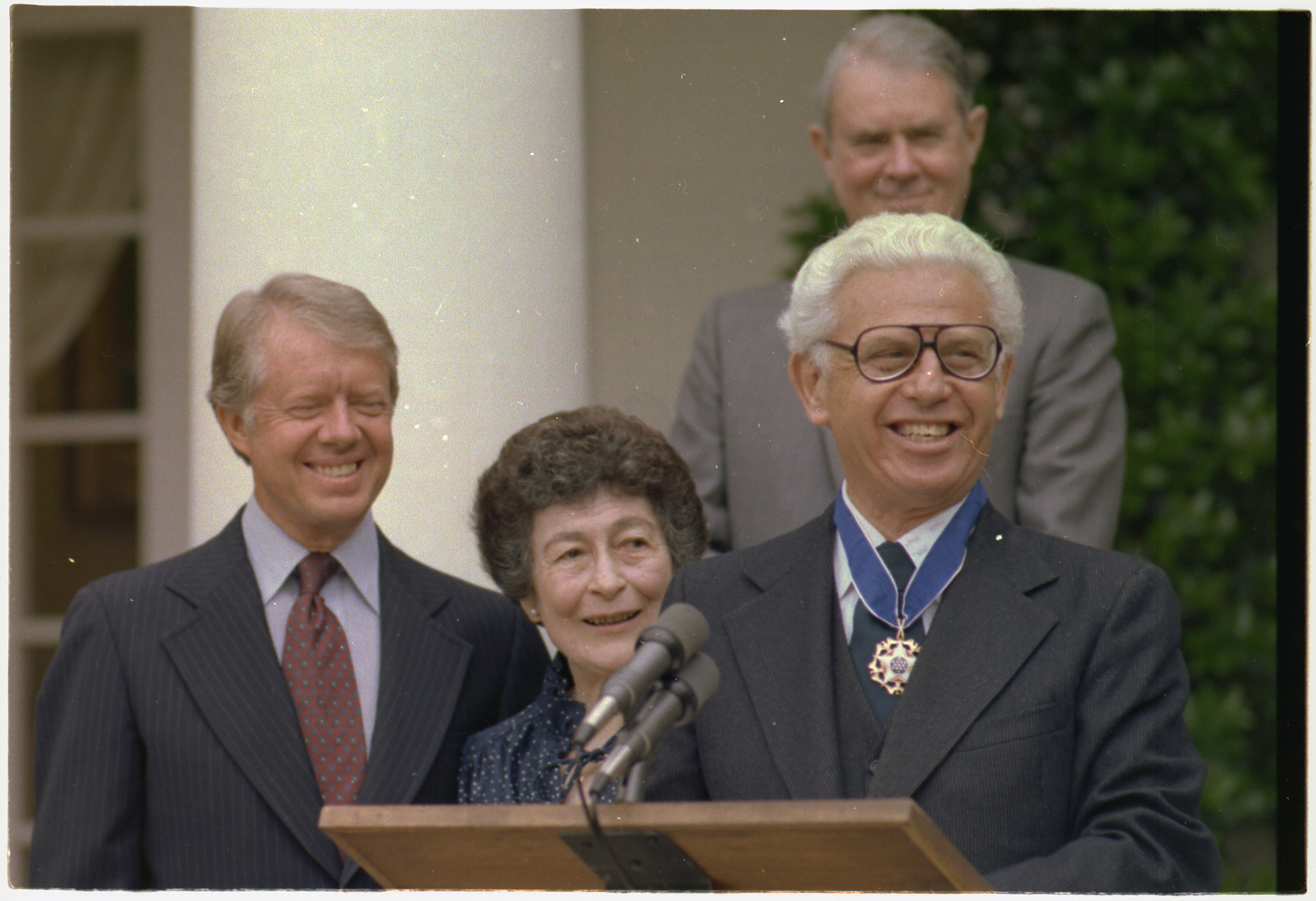
Arthur Goldberg speaking at his ceremony where he was awarded the Medal by President Jimmy Carter, 1978

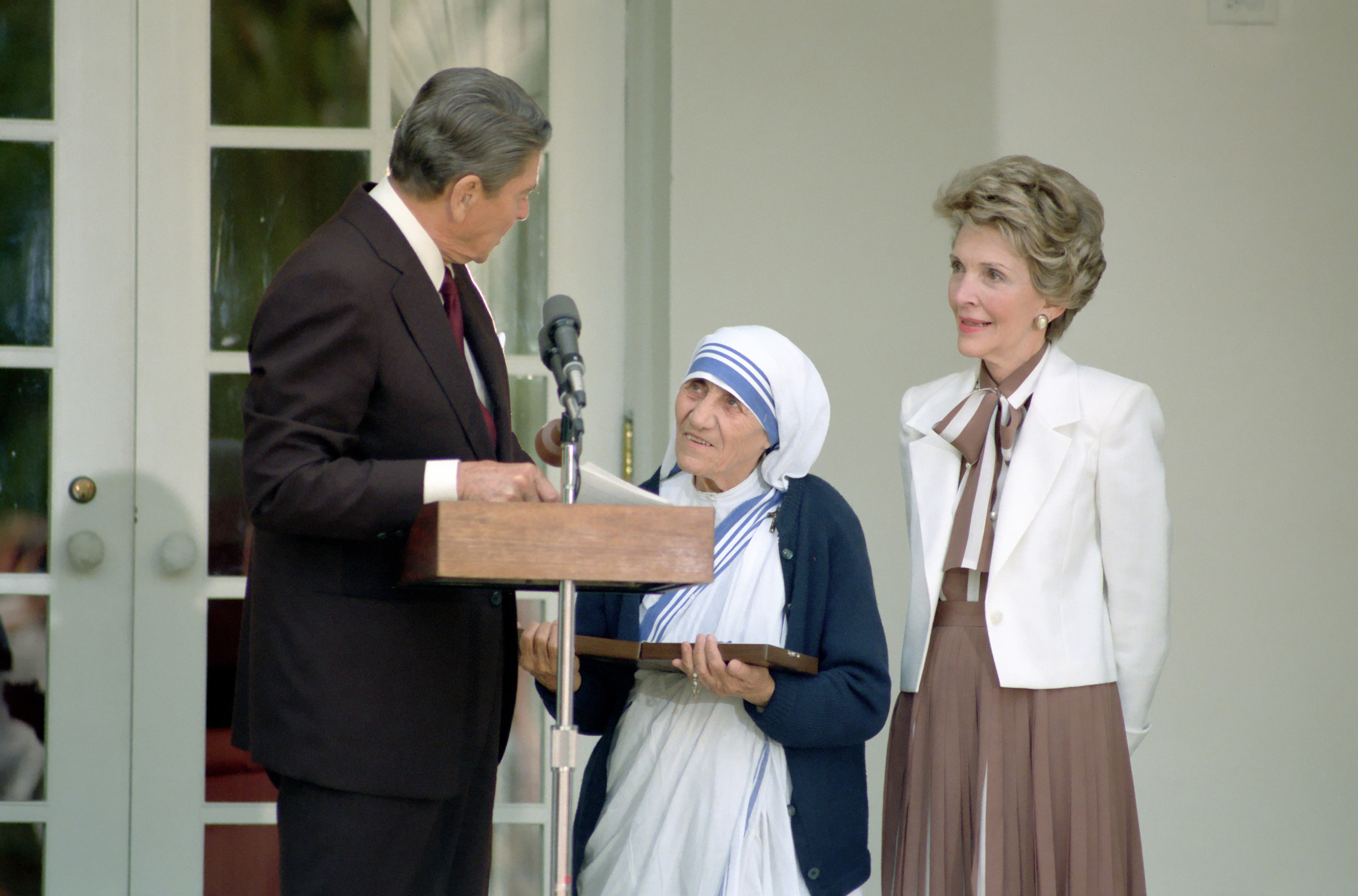
President Ronald Reagan presenting Mother Teresa with the award, 1985

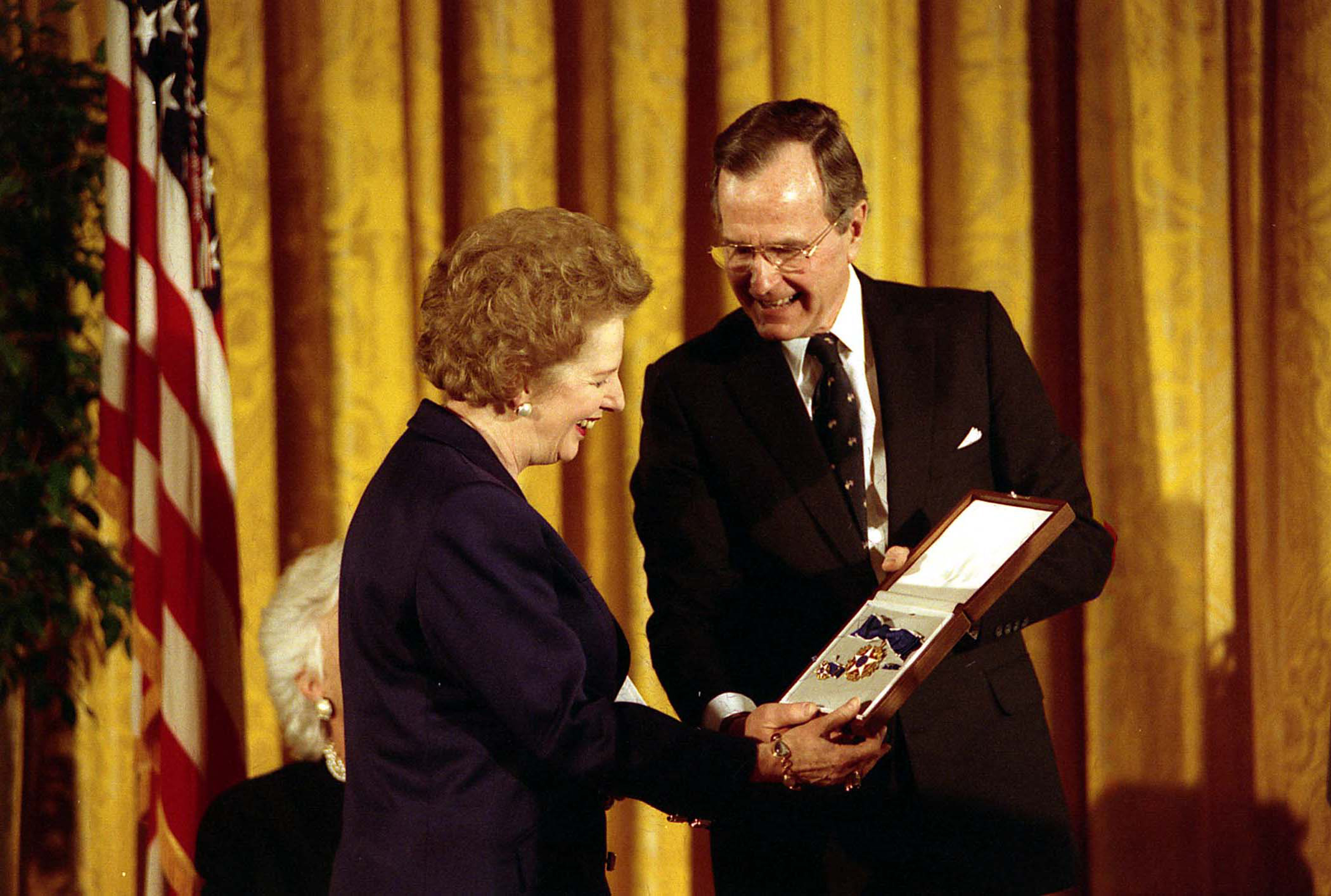
Former United Kingdom Prime Minister Margaret Thatcher receiving the award, in its unusual bow form, from President George H. W. Bush, 1991

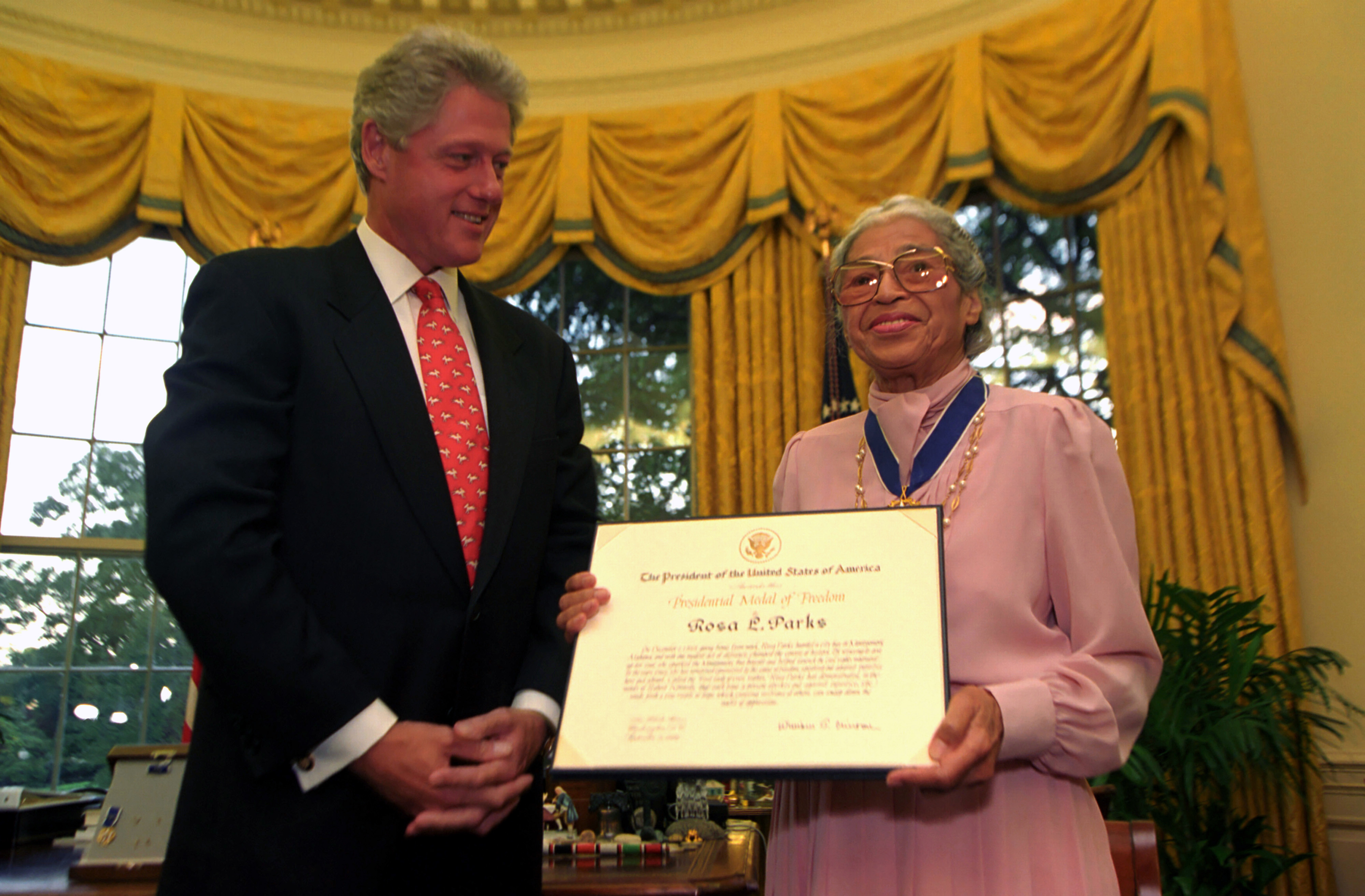
Rosa Parks receives the award from President Bill Clinton, 1996.

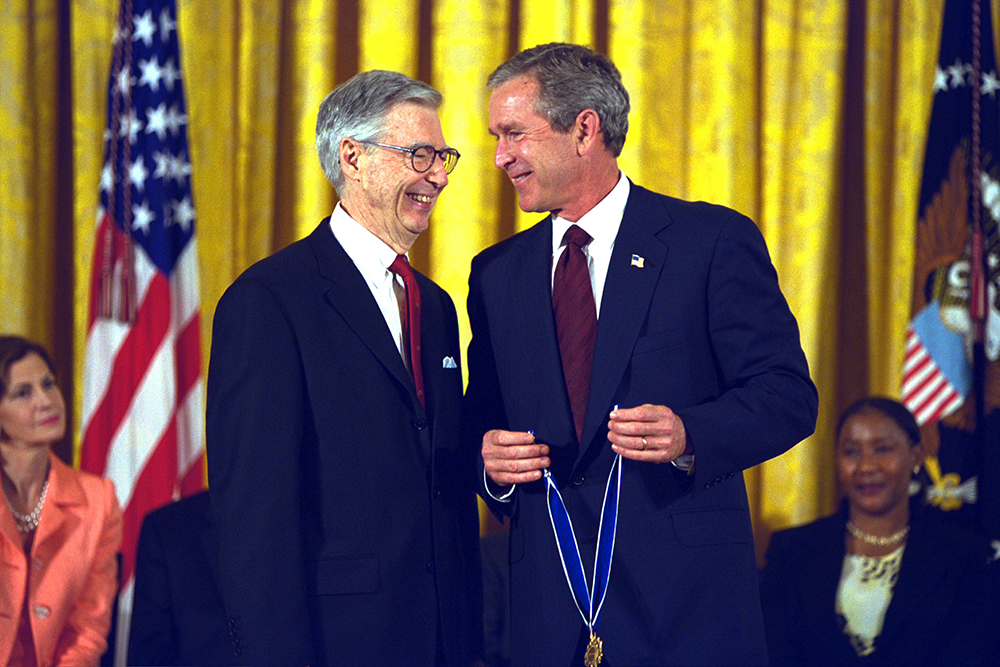
Fred Rogers smiles as he receives the award from President George W. Bush, 2002.

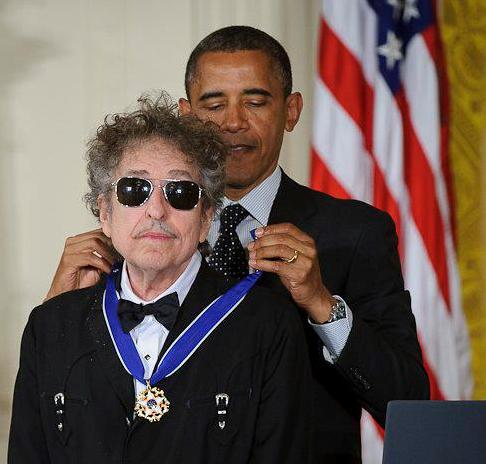
Bob Dylan receives the Medal from President Barack Obama, 2012.

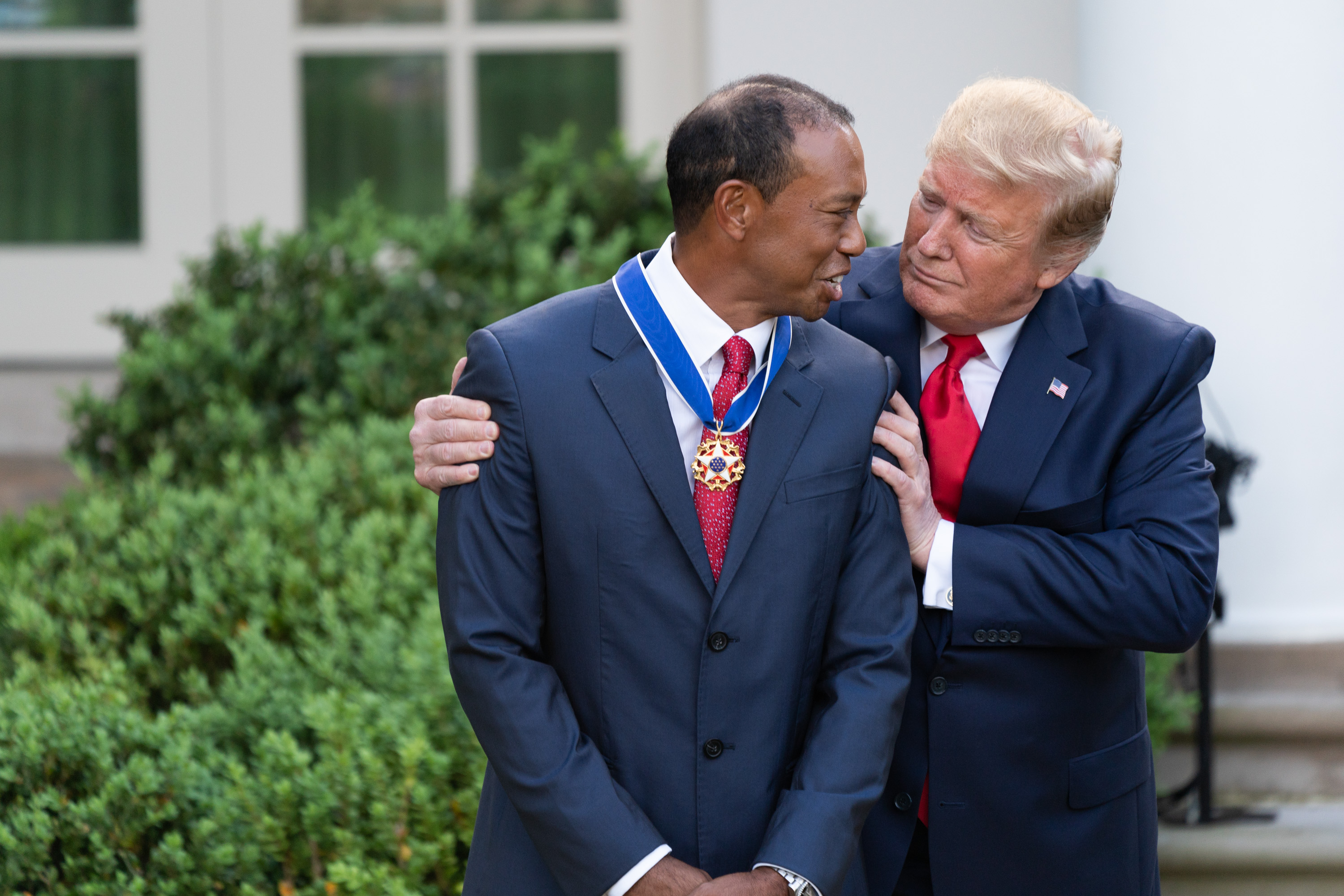
President Donald Trump presents the Medal to Tiger Woods, 2019.

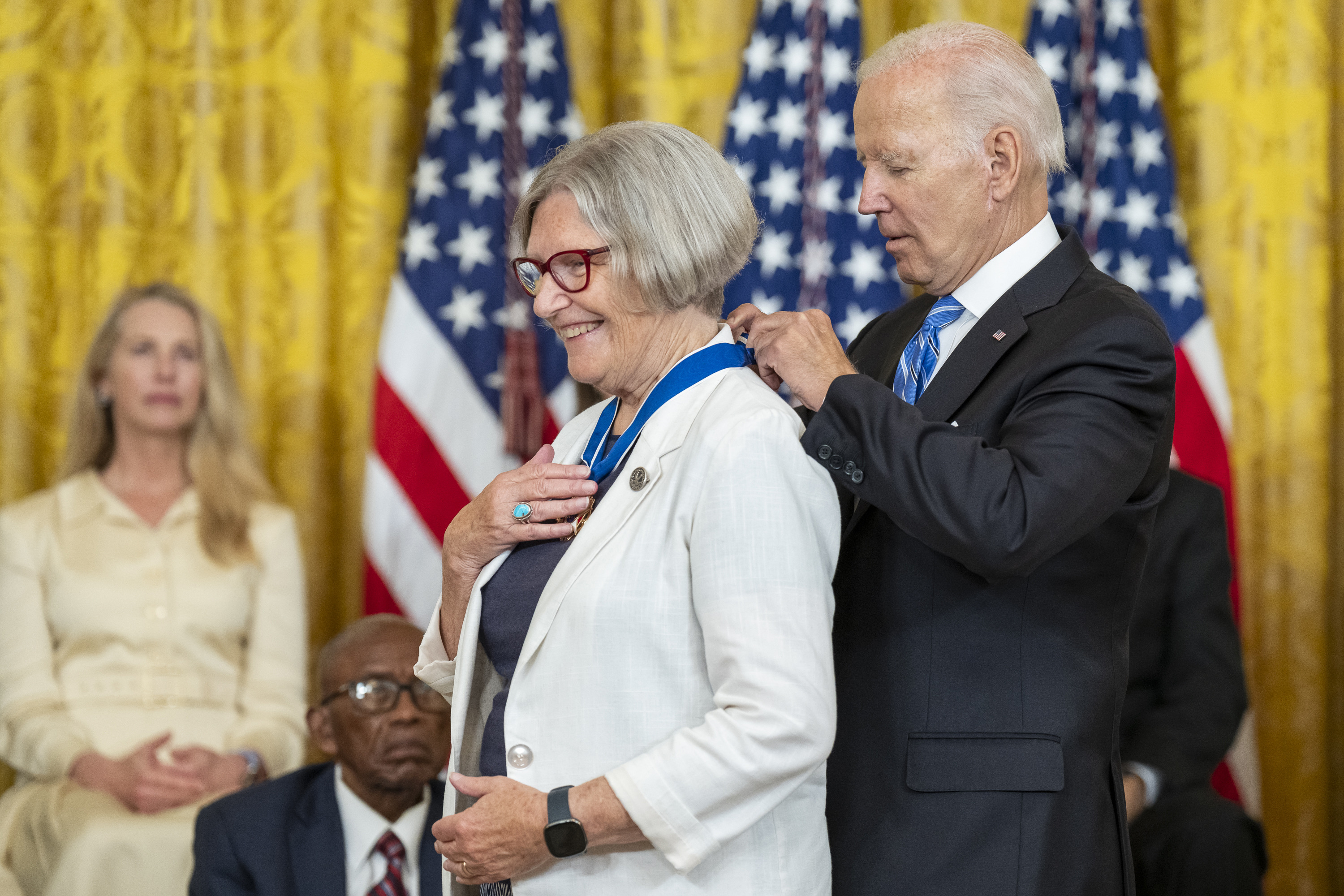
President Joe Biden presenting the Medal to Sister Simone Campbell, 2022

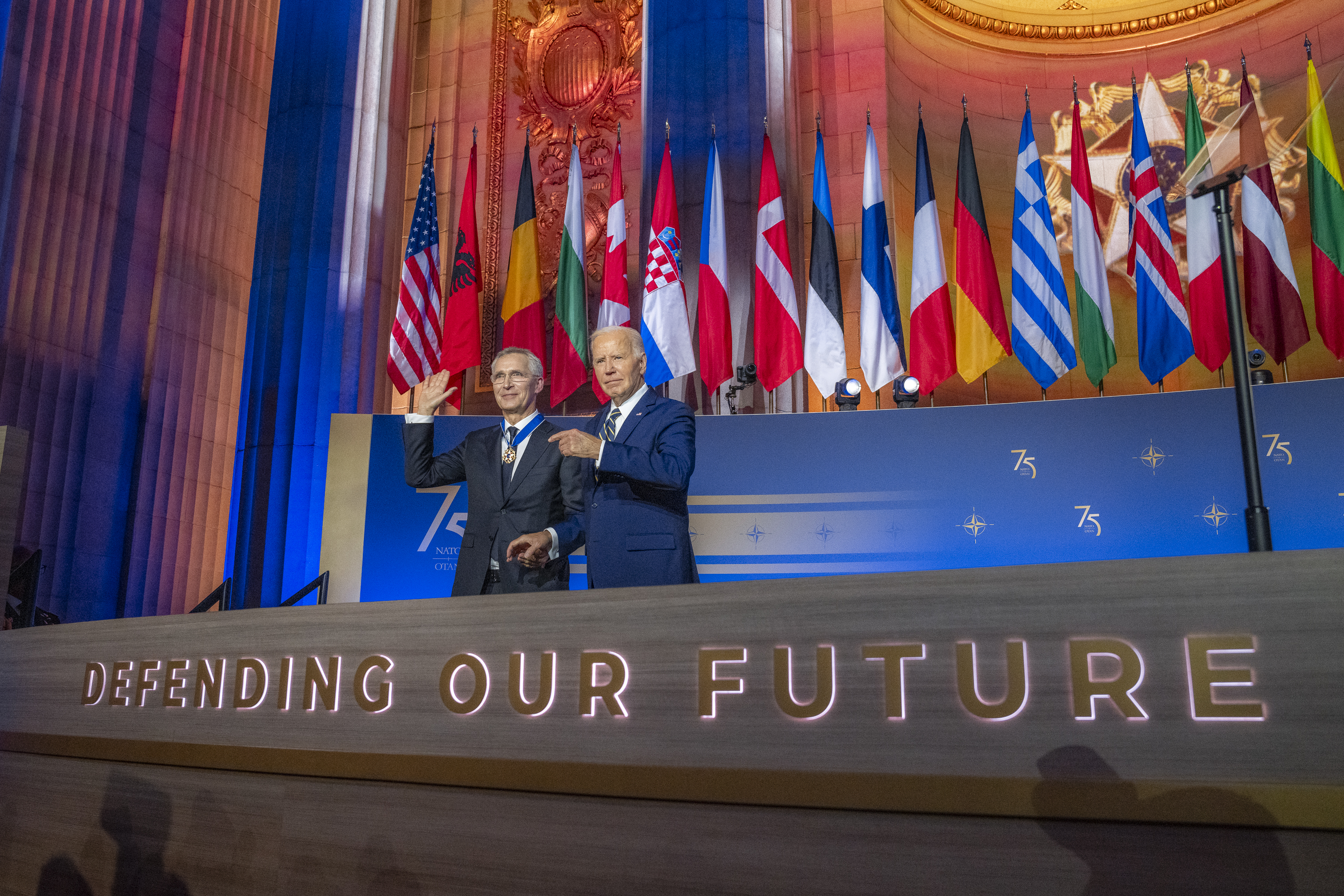
President Joe Biden presents the Medal to Jens Stoltenberg, 2024.

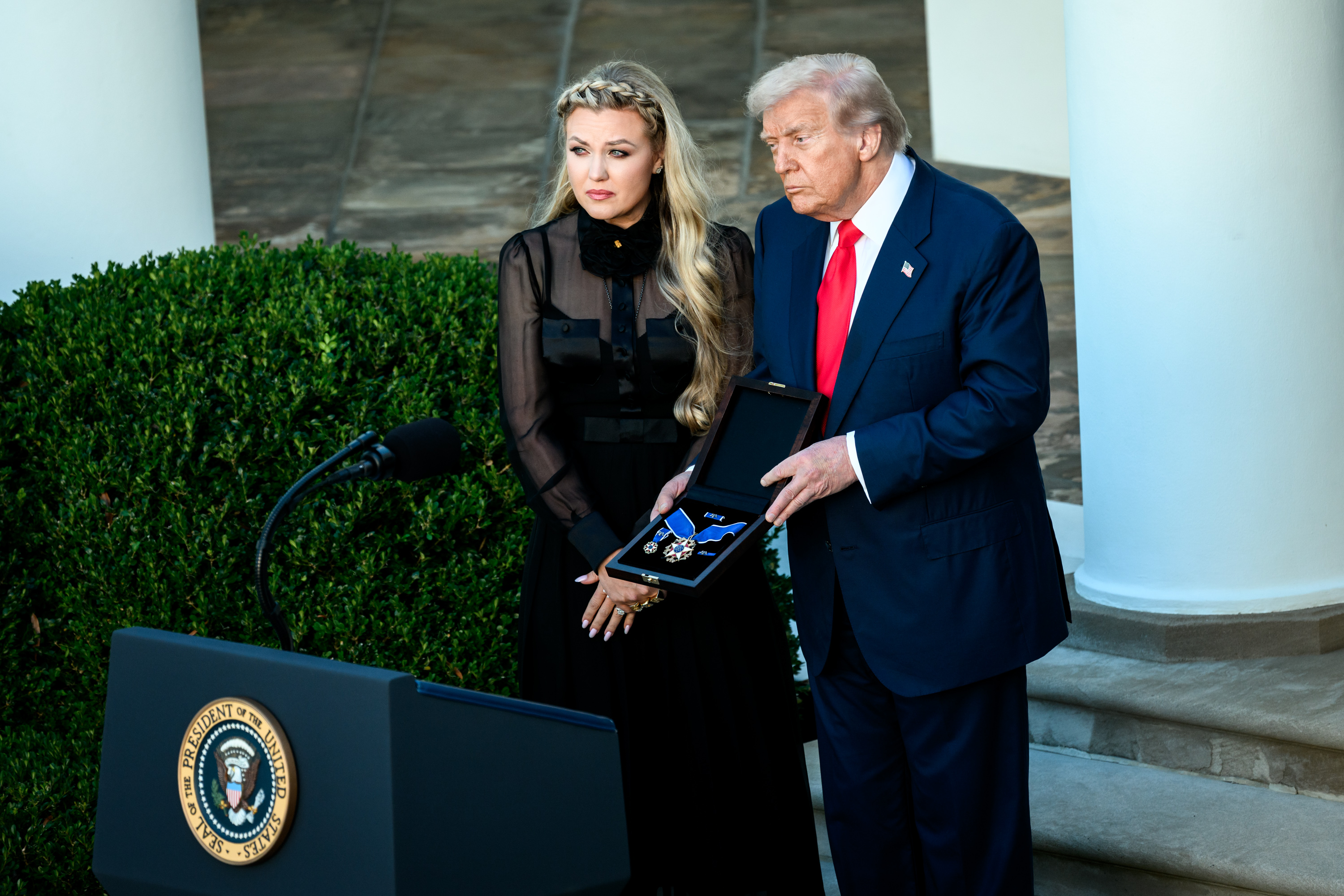
President Donald Trump presenting the medal to Erika Kirk, on behalf of her recently deceased husband Charlie Kirk, 2025

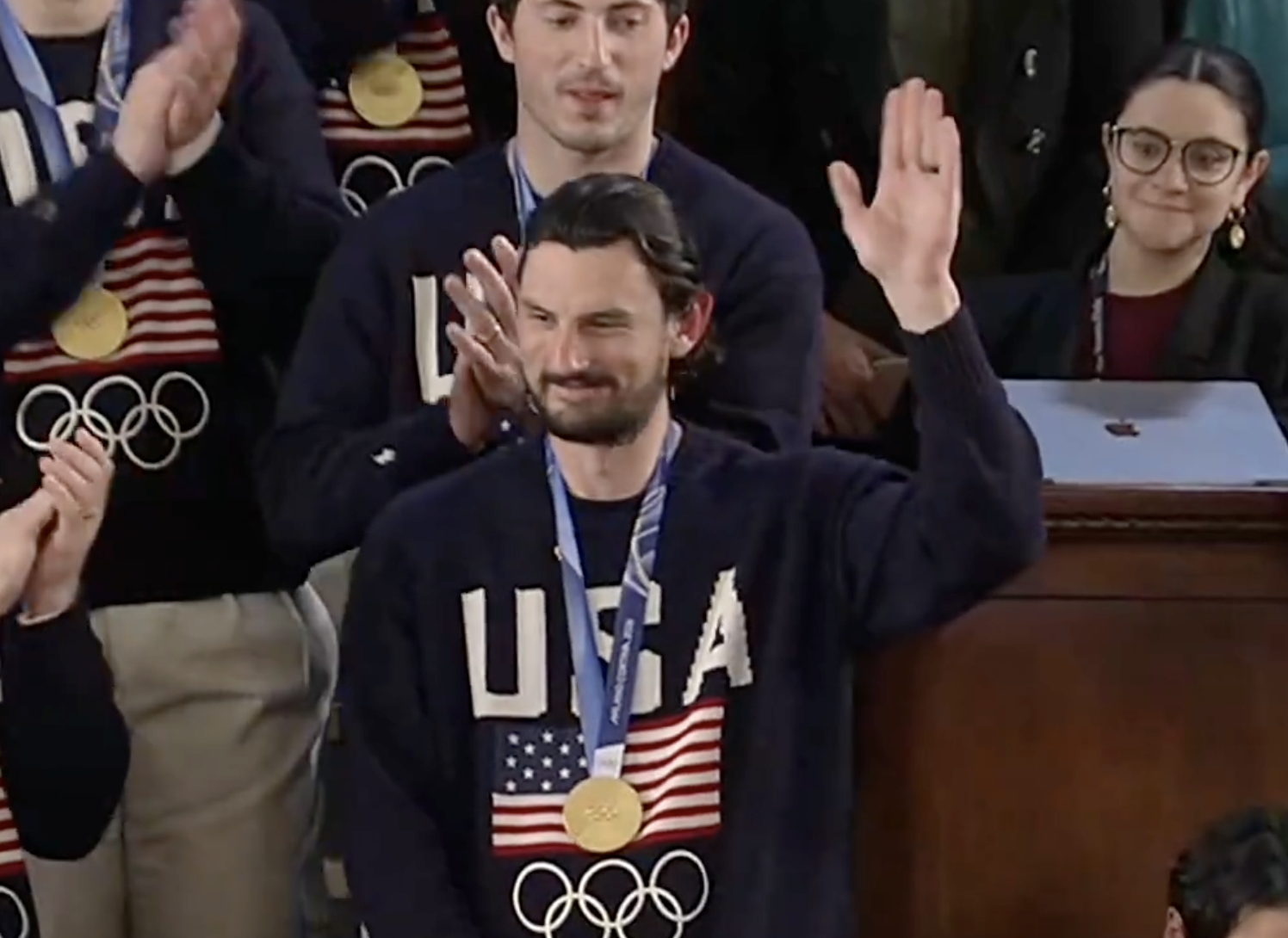
President Donald Trump announces Team USA goaltender Connor Hellebuyck to receive the Medal of Freedom at the State of The Union, 2026.

== See also ==
- Awards and decorations of the United States government
- Awards and decorations of the United States military
