= Pentagon Force Protection Agency =

Federal law enforcement agency within the U.S. Department of Defense

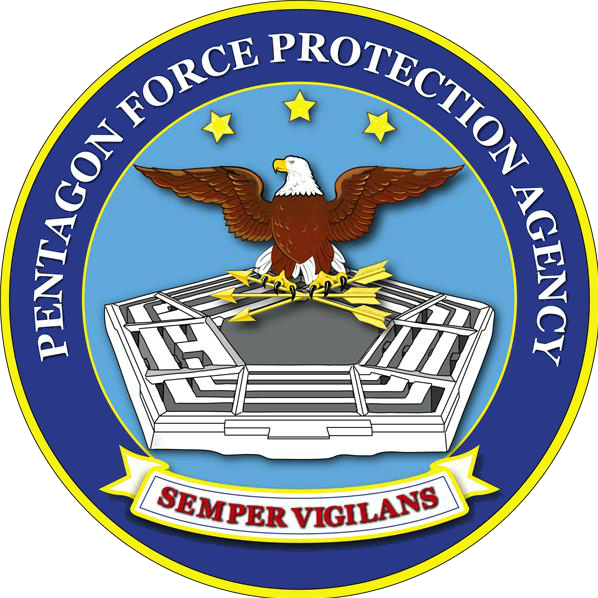
- "Protecting Those Who Protect Our Nation"
- Abbreviation: PFPA
- Motto: Semper Vigilans; Latin for Always Vigilant

Agency overview
- Formed: May 3, 2002
- Preceding agency: United States Pentagon Police

Jurisdictional structure
- Federal agency (Operations jurisdiction): United States
- Operations jurisdiction: United States
- Legal jurisdiction: The Pentagon and National Capital Region
- General nature: Federal law enforcement

Operational structure
- Headquarters: The Pentagon
- Agency executives: Chris Bargery, Director; Woodrow Kusse, Chief of Pentagon Police
- Parent agency: Department of Defense
- Child agency: United States Pentagon Police

Website
- www.pfpa.mil

The Pentagon Force Protection Agency (PFPA) is a federal law enforcement agency within the United States Department of Defense charged with protecting and safeguarding the occupants, visitors, and infrastructure of the Pentagon, the Mark Center Building, the Defense Health Agency headquarters, the United States Court of Appeals for the Armed Forces and other assigned DoD-occupied leased facilities within the National Capital Region. As of 2004, the Pentagon Force Protection Agency employed 482 police officers.

This mission is accomplished with law enforcement officers (United States Pentagon Police), criminal investigative and protective services agents; threat management agents; CBRN defense and explosives technicians; and anti-terrorism/force protection and physical security personnel.

The Pentagon Force Protection Agency provides a comprehensive protective intelligence analysis capability, which includes threat analysis, threat investigation, and criminal intelligence services to protect Pentagon facilities, employees and senior DoD personnel. The Pentagon Force Protection Agency liaises with other federal law enforcement and intelligence communities and conducts threat assessments and investigations for protective details while they are in the National Capital Region.

== Personnel ==
=== Director ===
The Director of the Pentagon Force Protection Agency is a Senior Executive Service position within the Office of the Director of Administration and Management.

In late 2022, Chris Bargery became acting Director after Daniel P. Walsh left the Pentagon Force Protection Agency.

Bargery is responsible for providing a full range of services to protect people, facilities, infrastructure and other resources at the Pentagon Reservation and in DoD-occupied facilities in the National Capital Region. Within this scope, he exercises the authorities of the Secretary of Defense under 10 U.S.C 2674 with respect to force protection, security, and law enforcement. He is the DoD principal liaison with State and local authorities, and communicates directly with DoD Components and other Executive Departments and Agencies in carrying out these assigned responsibilities and functions.

The first Director of the Pentagon Force Protection Agency was John N. Jester Jr., who previously served as the Pentagon police chief.

== Divisions ==
=== Pentagon Police ===
The Pentagon Police Division (PPD) is the principal law enforcement arm of the Pentagon Force Protection Agency (PFPA). PPD's role is to provide law enforcement and protective security services for The Pentagon and other Office of the Secretary of Defense (OSD) activities in the National Capital Region. These services include patrol, response, and investigation of criminal activity as well as protection of designated Defense officials.

== See also ==
- Protective Services Battalion
- Washington Headquarters Services
- Joint Task Force – National Capital Region
