= Washington Headquarters Services =

U.S. Department of Defense agency

- Washington Headquarters Services Seal

Agency overview
- Formed: October 1, 1977; 49 years ago
- Headquarters: The Pentagon Arlington County, Virginia
- Employees: 4,000 (2017)
- Agency executive: Regina F. Meiners, Acting Director
- Parent department: Department of Defense
- Website: www.whs.mil

Washington Headquarters Services (WHS) is a United States Department of Defense (DoD) Field Activity, created in 1977, to provide administrative and management support to multiple DoD components and military departments in the National Capital Region and beyond.

WHS currently has approximately 1,200 civilian and military employees and 2,000 contract employees, performing a wide range of essential administrative and management services in support of DoD operations, allowing WHS customer agencies and offices to focus exclusively on their core military missions.

== History ==
Before the establishment of WHS, the Office of the Secretary of Defense (OSD) provided administrative support for several DoD Components, including several outside of OSD purview. The Department's creation of WHS removed these support functions from OSD, allowing the OSD staff to focus on matters involving policy analysis and oversight. In 1987 it also took some of the responsibilities of the Military District of Washington.

In the following decades, WHS became firmly established as the agency for DoD-wide support functions, including those in metropolitan Washington DC National Capital Region and beyond. Its worldwide mission continues to evolve, as WHS provides consolidated administrative and operational support to several Defense Agencies, DoD Field Activities, DoD headquarters, various military departments, the White House, and, in a limited capacity, Congress.

The WHS mission has had substantial surges over recent years - including the massive program for the Renovation of the Pentagon, the implementation and then decommissioning of the National Security Personnel System (NSPS), the implementation of Base Realignment and Closures (BRAC), and the administration of the Mark Center Building. In Fiscal Year 2013, WHS took responsibility for consolidating and implementing the DoD Consolidated Adjudications Facilities (DoD CAF), supporting the eligibility for security clearances for DoD personnel, industry personnel, and Congressional and other staff.

In 2010, WHS implemented several remote work initiatives modeled after the General Services Administration's (GSA) program with supporting roles such as the Telework Managing Officer.

Beginning in 2020, due to the COVID-19 pandemic, a vast majority of WHS' workforce was allowed to work remotely. This led to cost-saving measures and access to a diverse pool of talent.

== Organization ==
Organizationally, WHS is aligned under the Director of Administration and Management (DA&M) for the Office of the Secretary of Defense (OSD). Divided into several directorates and specialty offices, teams of WHS personnel support the Defense Department customers by managing DoD-wide programs and operations for the Pentagon Reservation, Mark Center and other DoD-leased facilities in the National Capital Region and beyond.

=== Acquisition Directorate ===
The Acquisition Directorate is the Single Enterprise Contracting Office (SECO), providing acquisition services to all OSD components, significantly reducing annual OSD contracting costs. AD plans, coordinates, and manages the procurement programs essential to the mission of WHS, the Office of the Director of Administration and Management, and the Office of the Secretary of Defense. Programs support Pentagon Renovation, construction, professional and other services, commodities and supplies, effective communication and information technology systems, and special programs totaling over $1.5 billion a year.

=== Defense Office of Prepublication and Security Review ===
The Defense Office of Prepublication and Security Review (DOPSR) supports the review and authorized release of government materials from members and veterans of the military and the United States Intelligence Community, including reviews of classified and restricted information.

=== Facilities Services Directorate ===
The WHS Facilities Services Directorate (FSD) supports a customer base of about 64,000 civilian and military personnel, including the Office of the Secretary of Defense, Joint Chiefs of Staff, Defense Agencies, and the military departments in the National Capital Region. FSD provides administrative and operational support to specified DoD activities, including space management, maintenance, repair and alteration of assigned buildings, custodial services, landscape maintenance, trash and debris removal, building operations, construction management, property management, and other support services.

=== Enterprise Management ===
The WHS Enterprise Management Office (EM) serves as the corporate integrator of WHS and establishes the framework for bridging functional gaps among WHS directorates to secure mission accomplishment and achieve strategic goals across the Office of the Director of Administration and Management.

=== Executive Services Directorate ===
The WHS Executive Services Directorate provides administrative management and graphics services to the Office of the Secretary of Defense and executes federally mandated and regulatory programs, including Freedom of Information Act, Security Review, Privacy Act, Records Management, Directives, Forms, Declassification Review, and Information Collection.

=== Enterprise Information Technology Services Directorate ===
The WHS Enterprise Information Technology Services Directorate (EITSD) provides information technology equipment, services, and customer support to the Office of the Secretary of Defense, the Office of the Director of Administration and Management, and WHS.

=== Financial Management Directorate ===
The WHS Financial Management Directorate (FMD) provides planning, programming, budgeting and execution, and accounting services to WHS and its customers. These services include budget formulation, defense, and execution; financial management, internal audit, and compliance; budgetary accounting; financial reporting; official Representation Funds management; purchase card and travel card program management; and resource management.

=== Human Resources Directorate ===
The WHS Human Resources Directorate (HRD) provides human resources services for executive, political, military, and civilian personnel; performs security investigations and clearances; conducts adjudications and appeals; and manages the various voluntary campaign programs, e.g., the annual DoD Combined Federal Campaign.

=== General Counsel ===
The Office of General Counsel (OGC) provides legal services for the WHS, as well as for the Pentagon Force Protection Agency, and the Office of the Director of Administration & Management handles the operational matters.

== See also ==
- General Services Administration
- Pentagon Force Protection Agency
- Protective Services Battalion
