= Protective Services Battalion =

- Country: United States of America
- Branch: United States Army
- Role: Dignitary protection
- Size: >400 assigned personnel
- Part of: United States Army Criminal Investigation Command.
- Garrison/HQ: Fort Belvoir, Virginia
- Motto: Tutela Universitas Prolixus

The United States Army Protective Services Battalion also known as the CID Executive Protection Field Office is a unit of the U.S. Army Criminal Investigation Division responsible for providing worldwide dignitary protection for the Secretary of Defense, Chairman of the Joint Chiefs of Staff, Secretary of the Army, Chief of Staff of the Army, and over a dozen other protectees in domestic and overseas locations.

== History ==
The Field Office's peacetime protection operations can be traced back to the assignment of executive protection responsibilities within the DoD to the 1st Military Police Detachment in the late 1960s during heightened domestic unrest caused by the Vietnam War. In 1971, subsequent to the establishment of the U.S. Army Criminal Investigation Command as a major Army command, the Protective Services Activity was established to manage Department of Defense protective missions. During the build-up to the 1991 Gulf War, the PSA was reorganized as the Protective Services Unit (PSU). In October 2005, the unit was again reorganized as the Protective Services Battalion. In 2007, it was again reorganized to become the U.S. Army Protective Services Battalion.

Following 2022-2023 CID reforms, the Protective Services Battalion was reorganized into the Executive Protection Field Office.

== Mission ==
The Executive Protection Field Office protects high value personnel within the U.S. Department of Defense and U.S. Department of the Army, including the Secretary of Defense, the Chairman of the Joint Chiefs of Staff, the Secretary of the Army, and the Chief of Staff of the Army. It also protects foreign counterparts during official visits to the United States, along with designated former or retired Department of Defense officials.

CID utilizes protective intelligence and threat management investigative capabilities in the execution of its dignitary protection mission.

== Composition ==
With more than 400 special agents, police officers, analysts, physical security specialists, and professional support personnel spread across three continents, the Executive Protection Field Office is the largest office within the U.S. Army's Criminal Investigation Division.

== See also ==
- United States Air Force Security Forces
- United States Secret Service
- Royal Military Police Close Protection Unit
