= Gabriel Schulze =

American investor and businessman

- Born: United States
- Occupations: Investor and businessman
- Known for: Senior Managing Director at Cerberus Capital Management

Gabriel Schulze is an American private equity investor and businessman. He is a Senior Managing Director at Cerberus Capital Management.

== Early life and education ==
Schulze was born in the United States. He is a descendant of William Boyce Thompson, who founded Newmont, which later became the world's largest gold mining company.

== Career ==
=== Schulze Global Investments ===
After completing his studies, Schulze relocated to China, where he founded Schulze Global Investments (SGI) in 2006. The firm was later renamed SGI Frontier Capital before its acquisition in 2018. SGI focused on private equity investments in frontier and emerging markets, typically through minority equity positions in locally operated businesses.

In 2012, Schulze established a private equity fund focused on investments in Ethiopia, anchored by $10 million in family capital.

=== Cerberus Capital Management ===
In November 2018, SGI Frontier Capital was acquired by Cerberus Capital Management, a global investment firm co-founded by Steve Feinberg. Following the acquisition, Schulze became a Senior Managing Director.

=== North Korea ===
Beginning in 2008, Schulze provided a series of loans to North Korean state-owned enterprises, including financing for mining equipment and, in 2012, a loan to support the purchase of corn for workers at a state-affiliated conglomerate. He later extended additional financing to state-owned exporters.

In 2012, Schulze also sought to introduce Coca-Cola products into North Korea without authorization from the company. Coca-Cola stated that no representative of the company had been involved in discussions or had explored opening business in the country.

=== Role in U.S.–North Korea backchannel ===
In 2017, Schulze approached officials in the administration of U.S. President Donald Trump with information that a senior North Korean official was seeking to establish a backchannel for communication with the White House.

According to reporting by The Hill and The New York Times, Schulze conveyed the outreach to Jared Kushner, a senior adviser to the president, who in turn referred the matter to then–CIA Director Mike Pompeo.

The New York Times reported that the outreach was one step in a broader series of diplomatic efforts that led to the 2018 summit between Trump and North Korean leader Kim Jong Un.
