= Christopher C. Miller =

American colonel (born 1965)

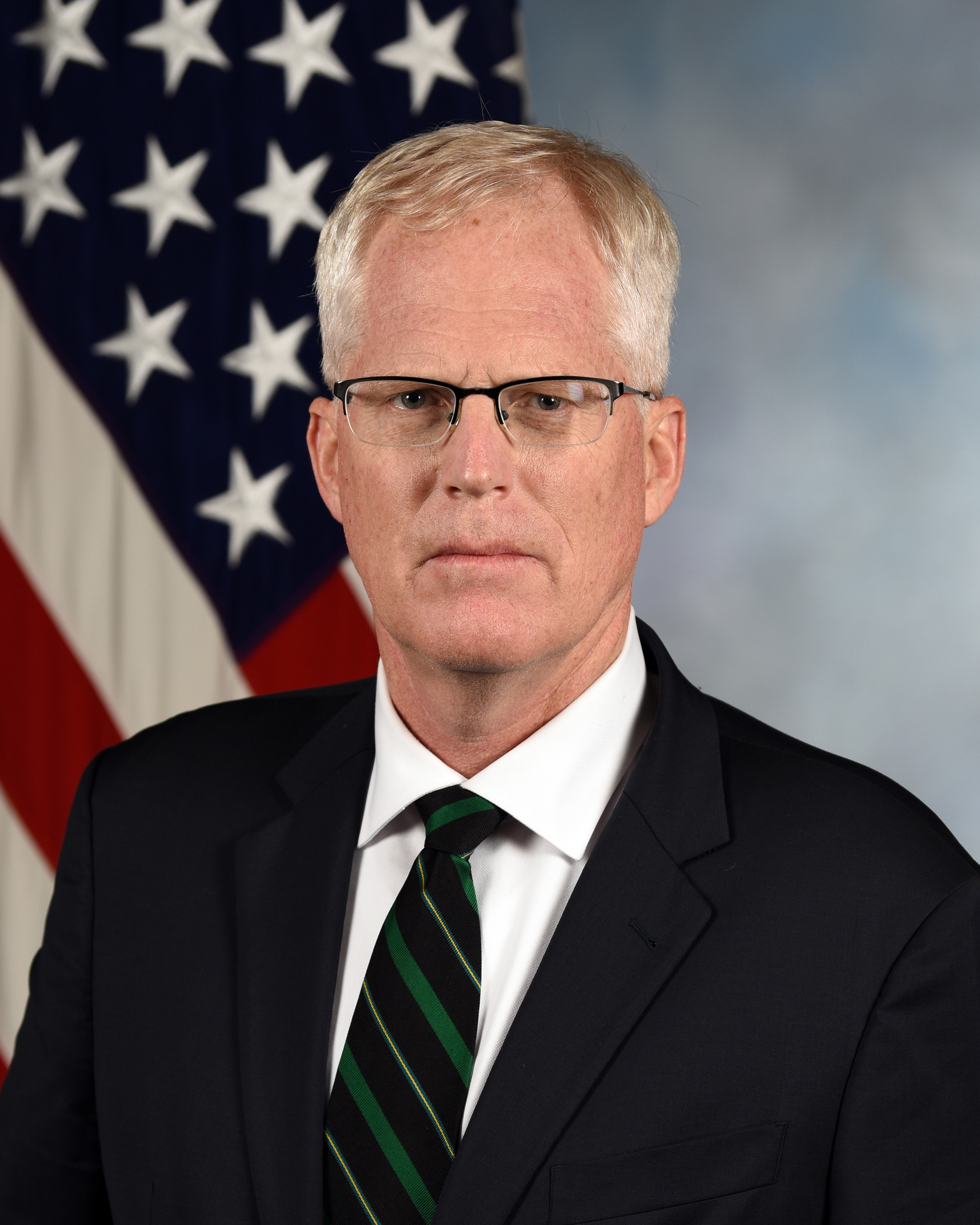
- Official portrait, 2020

Acting United States Secretary of Defense
- In office November 9, 2020 – January 20, 2021
- President: Donald Trump
- Preceded by: Mark Esper
- Succeeded by: David Norquist (acting)

6th Director of the National Counterterrorism Center
- In office August 10, 2020 – November 9, 2020
- President: Donald Trump
- Preceded by: Joseph Maguire
- Succeeded by: Christine Abizaid

Acting Assistant Secretary of Defense for Special Operations and Low-Intensity Conflict
- In office June 19, 2020 – August 10, 2020
- President: Donald Trump
- Preceded by: Thomas Alexander (acting)
- Succeeded by: Ezra Cohen-Watnick (acting)

Personal details
- Born: Christopher Charles Miller; October 15, 1965 (age 61) Platteville, Wisconsin, U.S.
- Spouse: Kathryn Maag (m. 1989)
- Children: 3
- Education: George Washington University (BA); Naval War College (MA); College of Naval Command and Staff; Army War College

Military service
- Allegiance: United States
- Branch/service: United States Army
- Years of service: 1983–2014
- Rank: Colonel
- Unit: 5th Special Forces Group; Intelligence Support Activity
- Battles/wars: War in Afghanistan; Iraq War

Christopher Charles Miller (born October 15, 1965) is an American Special Forces colonel who served as acting United States secretary of defense from November 9, 2020, to January 20, 2021. He previously served as Director of the National Counterterrorism Center from August 10 to November 9, 2020. Before his civilian service in the Department of Defense, Miller was a Green Beret, commanding units of the 5th Special Forces Group in Afghanistan and Iraq, and later spent time as a defense contractor.

Miller's tenure in the Trump administration began as Director of the National Counterterrorism Center, confirmed by voice vote in the United States Senate on August 6, 2020. President Donald Trump named Miller acting defense secretary after firing Mark Esper on November 9, 2020, six days after the 2020 presidential election. Miller was accused of obstructing the transition to Joe Biden's administration by Biden staff, which Miller denied.

Miller was criticized for his response to the 2021 storming of the United States Capitol. He approved the deployment of National Guard troops from neighboring states to reinforce the D.C. National Guard at 4:41 p.m., three hours after Capitol Police said that they were being overrun and two hours after city officials had asked for such assistance. Miller later testified that he had no need to speak with the president on January 6 because, "I had all the authority I needed and I knew what had to happen," and he said the delay was because he wanted to avoid a repeat of the Kent State shootings.

Upon the inauguration of Joe Biden on January 20, 2021, Miller was succeeded by then-Deputy Secretary of Defense David Norquist.

== Early life and education ==
Miller was born in Platteville, Wisconsin, on October 15, 1965, and raised in Iowa City from 1975. His mother, Lois Maxine Miller, taught at the University of Delaware. His father, Harvey Dell Miller, was police chief of Iowa City for 13 years, and according to Miller he "believed strongly in the nobility of public service". He had previously worked as an assistant professor of law and government at the University of North Carolina at Chapel Hill.

Miller attended Iowa City High School, before earning a Bachelor of Arts degree in history from George Washington University in 1987. He was awarded the Gardiner G. Hubbard Memorial Award in U.S. History for having the highest grade point average in the history department. He later received a Master of Arts in national security studies from the Naval War College in 2001. He also graduated from the College of Naval Command and Staff and the Army War College.

== Military service ==
Miller served in the military from 1983 to 2014. He began his career as an enlisted infantryman in the Army Reserve before commissioning as a second lieutenant in 1987 through ROTC. He joined Special Forces in 1993.

As a major, Miller served as a company commander in 5th Special Forces Group during the invasion of Afghanistan. He was part of the quick reaction force (QRF) after ODA 574 was hit by a Joint Direct Attack Munition (JDAM) in a friendly fire incident. Over the course of his career, Miller was deployed several times to Afghanistan and Iraq. In Iraq, he commanded Special Forces units in 2006 and 2007. His promotion to colonel was approved in December 2009.

Miller served as program executive officer (PEO) for rotary wing programs at U.S. Special Operations Command in 2010. One of his last assignments as an Army officer was as Director for Special Operations and Irregular Warfare in the Office of the Assistant Secretary of Defense for Special Operations/Low-Intensity Conflict & Interdependent Capabilities at the Pentagon in 2011.

== Civilian career through October 2020 ==
After retiring from the military in 2014, Miller worked as a defense contractor. Miller served in the civil service as an inspector for the assistant to the secretary of defense for intelligence oversight from late 2017 until he was detailed to the National Security Council in March 2018. During his tenure on the NSC, he served as counterterrorism adviser where he was involved in operations against ISIL before leaving in March 2019.

In 2020, he was appointed deputy assistant secretary of defense (DASD) for special operations and combating terrorism (SOCT). He was involved in designating Iran, Hezbollah, and American domestic terrorism as threats to the United States.

Trump nominated Miller to the position of director of the National Counterterrorism Center in March 2020, On 10 August 2020, he began his duties as director of the NCTC after being confirmed by a Senate voice vote on 6 August 2020.

== Acting Secretary of Defense ==
On November 9, 2020, Miller was appointed as acting secretary of defense, following the termination of Mark Esper. This occurred while President Trump was a lame duck. The top Republican on the House Armed Services Committee, Rep. Mac Thornberry, feared that U.S. adversaries would be emboldened by Trump's sudden withdrawals from conflict zones, and lame-duck purges of advisory boards.

Miller's chief of staff as acting secretary of defense was Kash Patel, a former aide to Congressman Devin Nunes. Patel is known for efforts to discredit investigations into Russian interference in the 2016 election.

=== Drawdowns of U.S. forces ===
Miller's first overseas trip occurred in the third week of November when he visited multiple military units in the Middle East and Africa to include a three-hour stopover in Mogadishu. Miller said that in addition to meeting senior military and foreign officials, he wanted to visit troops on the Thanksgiving holiday.

In November 2020, the political acting leadership of the Pentagon ordered drawdowns of U.S. Forces in Afghanistan, Iraq, and Somalia against the advice of U.S. military commanders. Some were critical of the decision with one group calling it "11th hour of President Donald Trump's administration, risk serious harm to hard-fought counterterrorism gains and American safety. With these recent moves, Miller appears to be disregarding important lessons about terrorists' resilience and the value of partnerships when conducting counterterrorism, while embracing a politically expedient but strategically nonsensical notion of 'ending forever wars' to appease the president during his final weeks in office." They also pointed to the inconsistency in Miller's message where he claimed that the United States is "on the verge of defeating al-Qa'ida" and noted the need to avoid "our past strategic error of failing to see the fight through to the finish," while also making the audacious statement that "Now, it's time to come home."

=== Interruption to presidential transition ===
On December 18, 2020, Miller ordered the Pentagon to postpone forty meetings with the incoming Joe Biden administration until January 1, 2021. Miller said that this was a "mutually agreed-upon holiday pause" with the Biden transition, but the Biden transition team said no such agreement had been made. Miller's decision to temporarily halt cooperation with the incoming administration came in the wake of President Donald Trump's refusal to concede in the election, refusals by various Trump administration political appointees to cooperate, and claims of fraud by the Trump administration.

=== Coup concerns and U.S. Capitol attack ===
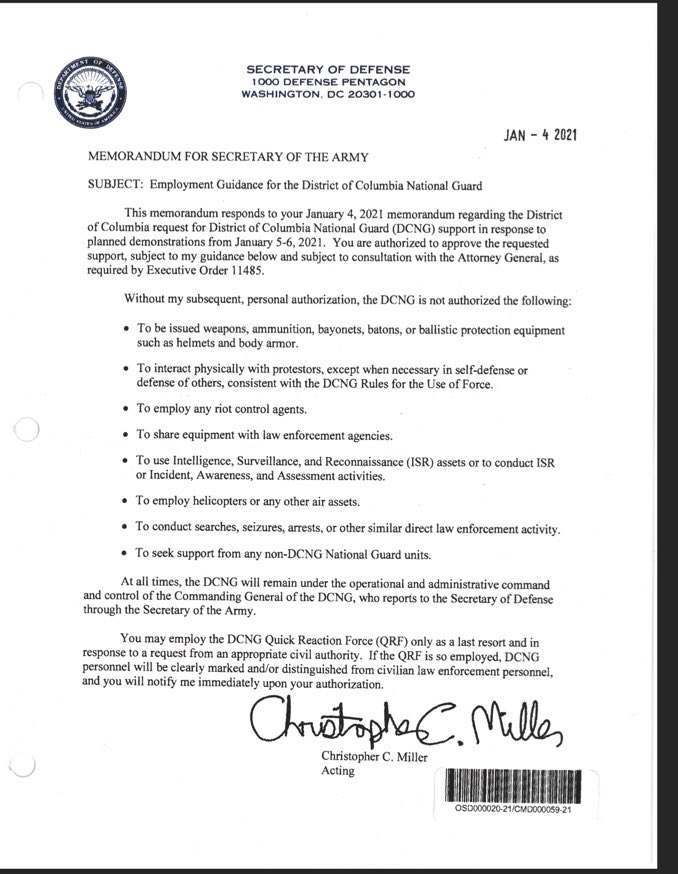
Miller memo of January 4, 2021

On January 3, 2021, all ten living former defense secretaries released an open letter in which they expressed concerns about a potential military coup to overturn the election results. The letter warned public officials—and Miller by name—that they would face grave consequences if they violated the Constitution.

That same day, Trump had a conversation with Acting Defense Secretary Miller, about which Miller later testified to the House Committee on Oversight and Reform during a May 2021 hearing into the January 6 riot. Miller testified that he told the president that Washington, D.C., mayor Muriel Bowser had placed a request for unarmed personnel to reinforce local law enforcement. He testified that Trump responded: "Fill it and do whatever was necessary to protect the demonstrators that were executing their constitutionally protected rights".

On January 5, Miller issued orders which prohibited deploying D.C. Guard members with weapons, helmets, body armor, or riot control agents without his personal approval. On January 5, Secretary of the Army Ryan McCarthy issued a memo placing limits on the District of Columbia National Guard. Maj. Gen. William J. Walker, the commanding general of the D.C. National Guard, later explained: "All military commanders normally have immediate response authority to protect property, life, and in my case, federal functions—federal property and life. But in this instance I did not have that authority."

Miller's actions on January 6 faced scrutiny. After rioters breached the Capitol Police perimeter, Miller waited more than three hours before authorizing the deployment of the National Guard. Miller did not provide that permission until 4:32 pm, after assets from Virginia had already entered the District, and Trump had instructed rioters to "go home." Miller testified that he was trying to avoid a repeat of the Kent State shootings.

Testifying under oath to the United States House Select Committee on the January 6 Attack, Miller affirmed that President Donald Trump told him he should give D.C. Mayor Bowser any support she requested, and Trump guessed they would need 10,000 troops on Jan. 6 to contain the pro-Trump protestors. Miller also said that Trump never gave him a formal order to have 10,000 troops ready to be deployed to the Capitol on January 6. "I was never given any direction or order or knew of any plans of that nature," said Miller. He later said definitively, "There was no direct, there was no order from the President."

According to Miller's testimony, he did not speak with Trump at any time during the Capitol attack: "I didn't need to. I had all the authority I needed and I knew what had to happen," he said. Miller rejects the notion that the Pentagon dragged their feet protecting the Capitol, calling that notion "complete horseshit", and he insists they "had their game together". After reassessing what happened on January 6, Miller acknowledged something they were unaware of beforehand: "It seems clear there was an organized conspiracy with assault elements". Aside from whether that unawareness affected the Pentagon's response, Miller says the conspiracy was organized and set in motion before Trump spoke on January 6, and thus should not be attributed solely to what Trump said on that date.

Miller has acknowledged that a communication problem may have occurred. He ordered that the National Guard be “mobilized” to defend the Capitol, but that is not the same thing as ordering the National Guard to be “deployed” (or “employed”), and this distinction may have delayed the response further.

=== Comments about Russia and about U.S. fighter jets ===
In a January 14, 2021, interview, Miller praised Russia's military capabilities, given their larger problems (e.g., declining population and single source of revenue) saying, "professionally I'm like, wow, they're doing pretty well, and they're using a lot of irregular warfare concepts, information, all this stuff, in a way that, you know, like . . . good on them."

Miller criticized certain Pentagon programs and strategies and declared that he could "not wait to leave the job." Specifically, he derided the F-35 Joint Strike Fighter and criticized efforts to develop fifth- and emerging sixth-generation fighter aircraft.

Miller supported innovative plans for the Defense Department to do "things below the threshold of armed conflict" which he viewed as the future of the department, even though "a lot of people just want to continue doing the same old thing again and again. I think that's the definition of insanity, isn't it? Oh, did I say that out loud?"

== Post-Trump administration ==
Miller published his own memoir Soldier Secretary: Warnings from the Battlefield & the Pentagon About America's Most Dangerous Enemies, in February 2023. In the book, Miller suggested that the US military budget could be cut by 40 to 50 percent, restoring to the pre-9/11 level.

In 2023, Miller authored the chapter on the Department of Defense for the ninth edition of the Heritage Foundation's book Mandate for Leadership, which provides the policy agenda for Project 2025.

== Personal life ==
Miller married Kathryn Maag Miller on September 16, 1989. She works as an office manager for a health and environment lobbying group. They have three children.

Political offices
Preceded by Mark Esper	United States Secretary of Defense; Acting; 2020–2021	Succeeded by David Norquist; Acting
