= Patrick M. Shanahan =

American businessman and government official (born 1962)

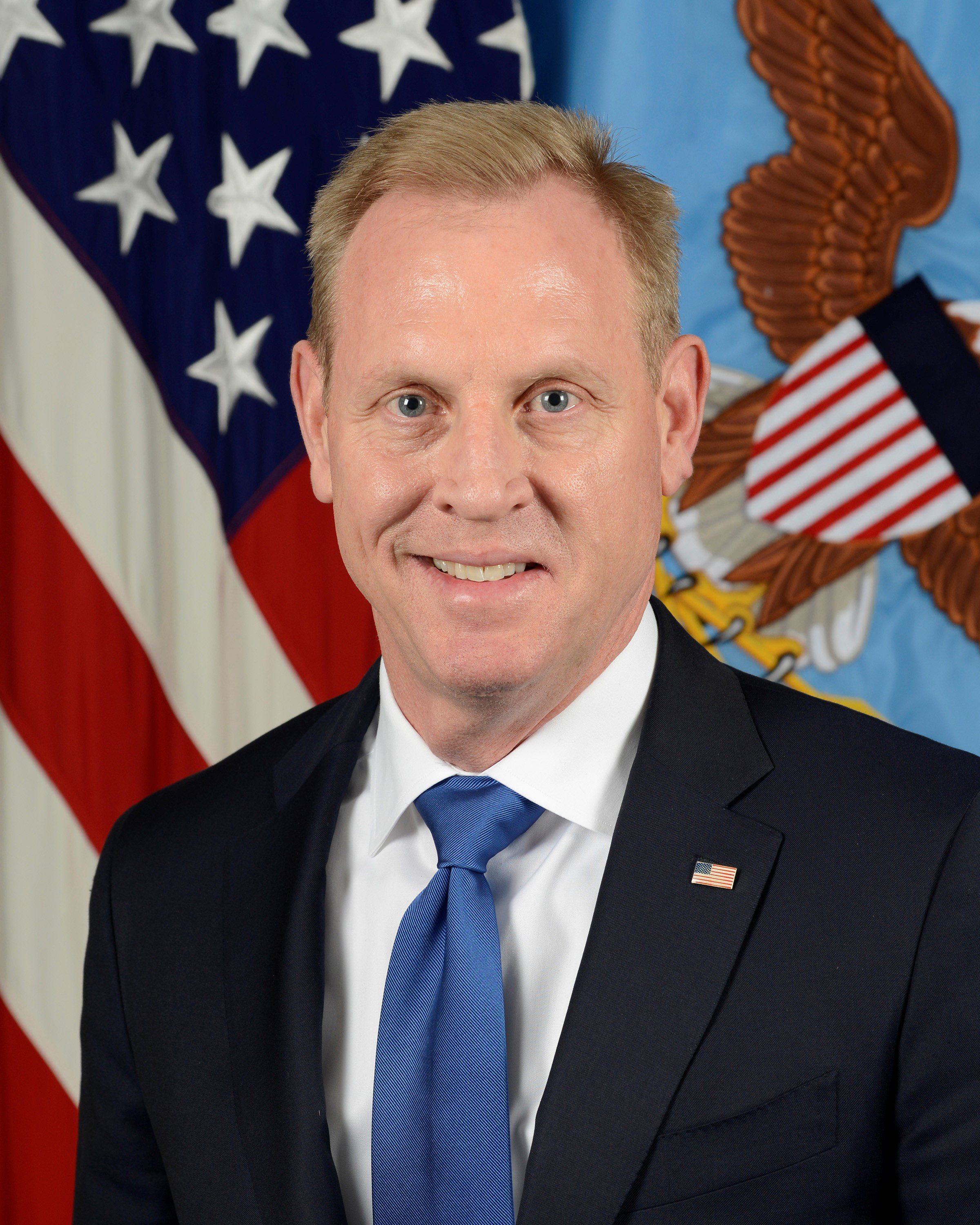
- Official portrait, 2018

United States Secretary of Defense
- Acting
- In office January 1, 2019 – June 23, 2019
- President: Donald Trump
- Deputy: David Norquist (acting)
- Preceded by: Jim Mattis
- Succeeded by: Mark Esper (acting)

33rd United States Deputy Secretary of Defense
- In office July 19, 2017 – January 1, 2019
- President: Donald Trump
- Secretary: Jim Mattis; Himself (acting)
- Preceded by: Robert O. Work
- Succeeded by: David Norquist

Personal details
- Born: Patrick Michael Shanahan; June 27, 1962 (age 64) Palo Alto, California, U.S.
- Children: 3
- Education: University of Washington (BS); Massachusetts Institute of Technology (MS, MBA)

Patrick Michael Shanahan (born June 27, 1962) is an American businessman and the president and chief executive officer of Spirit AeroSystems. He is a former United States federal government official who served as the acting United States secretary of defense in 2019. President Donald Trump appointed Shanahan to the role after the resignation of Jim Mattis. Prior to that, Shanahan served as Deputy Secretary of Defense from 2017 to 2019. Before his government service, he previously spent 30 years at Boeing in a variety of roles.

The White House announced on May 9, 2019, that Trump intended to nominate Shanahan as the secretary of defense. That decision was reversed on June 18, 2019, when Shanahan said that he was withdrawing, and Trump announced that he would be making Mark Esper the acting U.S. secretary of defense. Shanahan's last day in that position was June 24, 2019.

== Early life and education ==
Shanahan was born on June 27, 1962, in Palo Alto, California, the son of Jo-Anne Genevieve (née David) and Michael George Shanahan. His father's original surname was "Rockholtz," and "Shanahan" is the surname of Patrick's step-grandfather. He grew up in Seattle, Washington, where he graduated from Bishop Blanchet High School in 1980. He attended the University of Washington where he earned a Bachelor of Science degree in mechanical engineering. He then earned a Master of Science degree in mechanical engineering from the Massachusetts Institute of Technology, and a Master of Business Administration from the MIT Sloan School of Management.

== Career at Boeing (1986–2017) ==
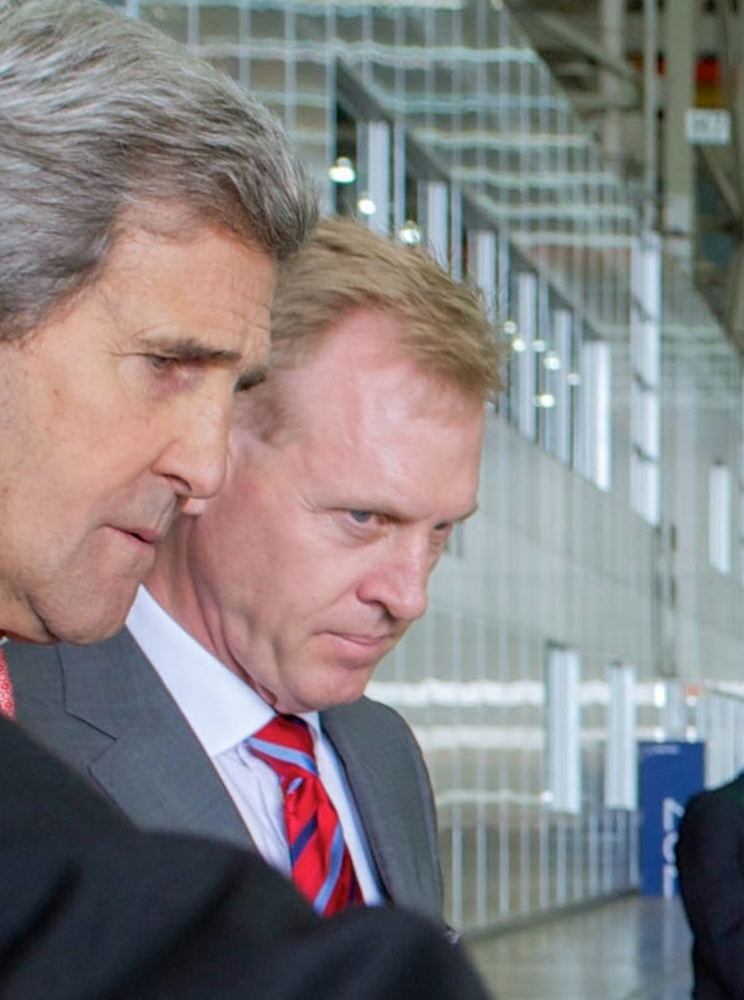
Shanahan with John Kerry

Shanahan joined Boeing in 1986, becoming involved in Computer Services and the Boeing 777 program. Over the course of his career, he held management roles with respect to the Boeing Missile Defense Systems, as well as 737, 747, 767, 777, and 787 commercial airline programs. He also played a role spearheading the recovery of Boeing's 787 program, and was known there as "Mr. Fix-it" from as early as 2008.

Shanahan served Boeing Commercial Airplanes as vice president and general manager of the Boeing 757 program, with responsibility for the design, production, and profitability of the 757 family of planes. He also held leadership positions on the Boeing 767 program and in the fabrication division.

Shanahan then served as vice president and general manager for Boeing Rotorcraft Systems in Philadelphia. He was responsible for all U.S. Army Aviation programs and site activities in Philadelphia and Mesa, Arizona. Programs at these facilities included the V-22 Osprey, CH-47 Chinook, and the AH-64D Apache.

Shanahan served as vice president and general manager of Boeing Missile Defense Systems, starting in December 2004 overseeing the Ground-based Midcourse Defense system, Airborne Laser and Advanced Tactical Laser programs. He served as vice president and general manager of the Boeing 787 Dreamliner program, where he led the program during a period of the aircraft's development from 2007 to 2008. He next served as senior vice president of Airplane Programs at Boeing Commercial Airplanes, beginning in December 2008.

In April 2016, he became senior vice president, Supply Chain & Operations, for Boeing. His responsibilities in that position included manufacturing operations and supplier management functions, carrying out advanced manufacturing technologies, and global supply chain strategies.

Shanahan was a member of the Boeing Executive Council.

== United States Department of Defense (2017–2019) ==
=== Deputy Secretary of Defense ===
On March 16, 2017, President Trump announced his intent to nominate Shanahan as the 33rd Deputy Secretary of Defense, the Pentagon's second-highest civilian position. Trump nominated Shanahan to lead plans to increase the size of the military.

Shanahan's Senate confirmation hearing took place on June 20, 2017. During the hearing, Senator John McCain, a proponent of providing arms to Ukraine, threatened to block Shanahan's nomination over his response in a written statement about whether or not the U.S. should provide such weapons to Ukraine. Shanahan said he did not have access to classified military information in order to make a decision on the matter.

Robert O. Work, the Deputy Secretary of Defense at the end of the Obama administration, remained in the position until Shanahan's confirmation. Shanahan was confirmed by the United States Senate with a vote of 92–7 on July 18, 2017, and became the 33rd Deputy Secretary of Defense on July 19, 2017.

=== Acting Secretary of Defense ===
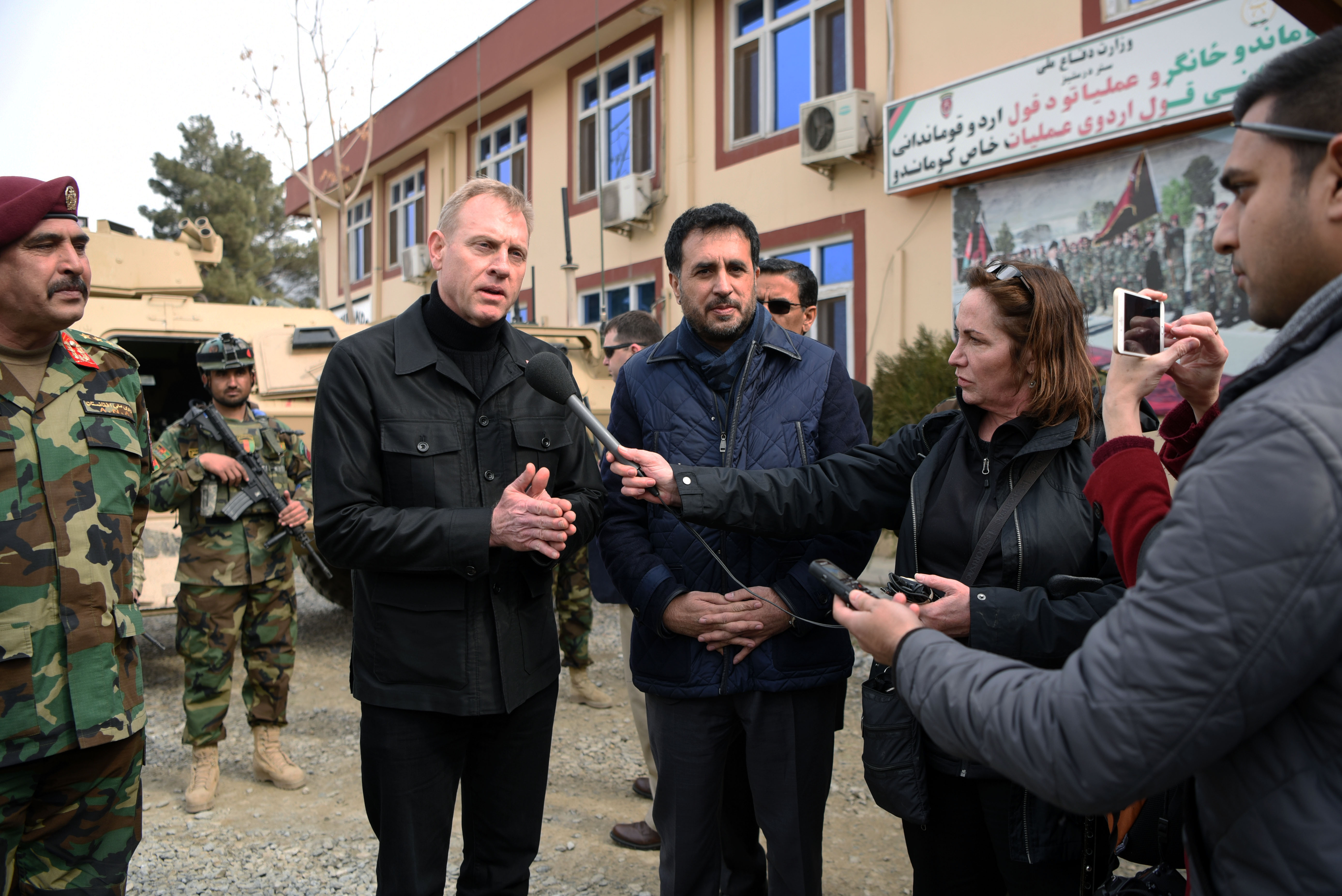
Shanahan in Afghanistan, February 11, 2019

President Trump initially announced that Shanahan would be elevated on February 28, 2019, to Acting Defense Secretary, when the Jim Mattis resignation was originally to become effective. But a follow-up Trump Twitter announcement on December 23, 2018, stated that Shanahan would be elevated two months prior to the resignation date announced by Mattis. Trump accelerated Mattis's departure date after reportedly becoming angered by the media coverage of his resignation letter, due to language in Mattis's resignation letter which criticized Trump's worldview. Shanahan assumed the office on January 1, 2019.

Shanahan made an unannounced trip to Afghanistan on February 11, 2019, meeting with President Ashraf Ghani, the country's chief executive Abdullah Abdullah, and defense minister Asadullah Khalid during the first few hours of his trip.

Shanahan visited the US–Mexico border on February 23, 2019, with Chairman of the Joint Chiefs of Staff USMC General Joseph Dunford and Commander of the United States Army Corps of Engineers Lt. Gen. Todd T. Semonite for joint assessments with Border Patrol, DHS, and others.

In late March 2019, news sources reported that Shanahan was under investigation by Office of Inspector General because of allegations he improperly advocated on behalf of his former employer, Boeing Co.

In a May 2019 internal memo, Shanahan ordered new restrictions on how information about global operational plans and orders are shared with Congress, such that summaries are provided rather than an actual plan or order that was requested.

On May 9, 2019, the White House announced that President Trump would nominate Shanahan as his second defense secretary, despite skepticism and even hostility from lawmakers and officials within the Department of Defense. However, Shanahan withdrew from the confirmation process in June, following increased public scrutiny of several incidents and allegations of domestic violence involving Shanahan's ex-wife and son. In a tweet addressing the withdrawal of the nomination, President Trump said that Shanahan intended to "devote more time to his family."

== Post-Department of Defense career ==
Since leaving government service in 2019, Shanahan has been appointed to serve on various boards of directors including Zanite Acquisition Corp. (2021), Leidos (2022), and CAE Inc. (2022). On October 2, 2023, Shanahan, a member of the company's board of directors, was appointed interim President and chief executive officer of Spirit AeroSystems, Inc.

== Personal life ==
Shanahan lives in Seattle with his wife, Adrienne Shanahan. He has three children from a previous marriage.

== Awards and memberships ==
Current positions

- Member, National Academy of Engineering in 2019 for aerospace industry leadership in commercial aircraft, missile defense and rotorcraft and for service to the Department of Defense.
- Fellow, Royal Aeronautical Society
- Fellow, Society of Manufacturing Engineers, 2004
- Associate Fellow, American Institute of Aeronautics and Astronautics

Former positions

- Secretary and Treasurer, American Helicopter Society International Board of Directors
- Chair of Board of Regents at University of Washington
- Regent, University of Washington 2012–2017
- Board of directors, American Parkinson Disease Association
- Member, Washington Roundtable

Awards

- Distinguished Service (2019), University of Washington College of Engineering

Political offices
Preceded by Bob Work	United States Deputy Secretary of Defense; 2017–2019	Succeeded by David Norquist; Acting
Preceded by Jim Mattis	United States Secretary of Defense; Acting; 2019	Succeeded by Mark Esper; Acting
