= Replicator (United States military) =

2023 US Department of Defense program

Replicator is the name of a United States Department of Defense program intended to pioneer ways to cheaply produce large amounts of weapons or systems for the U.S. military.

It was announced on August 23, 2023, by Deputy Defense Secretary Kathleen Hicks as a means of quickly producing weapons to deter and counter China. In her announcement, Hicks said the first type of weapons to be produced under Replicator were to be autonomous systems; she did not specify whether these would be, for example, aerial drones or unmanned vessels.

The Replicator program announced its first batch of contracts on May 6, 2024; they included purchases of uncrewed watercraft, aerial drones, and anti-drone defenses "of various sizes and payloads from several traditional and non-traditional vendors." Some other contracts “remain classified, including others in the maritime domain and some in the counter-UAS portfolio”, a Defense Department release said.

On September 30, 2024, Defense Secretary Lloyd Austin III announced a new phase of the program, dubbed Replicator 2, that would focus on anti-drone defensive systems.
