= Kathleen Hicks =

American government official (born 1970)

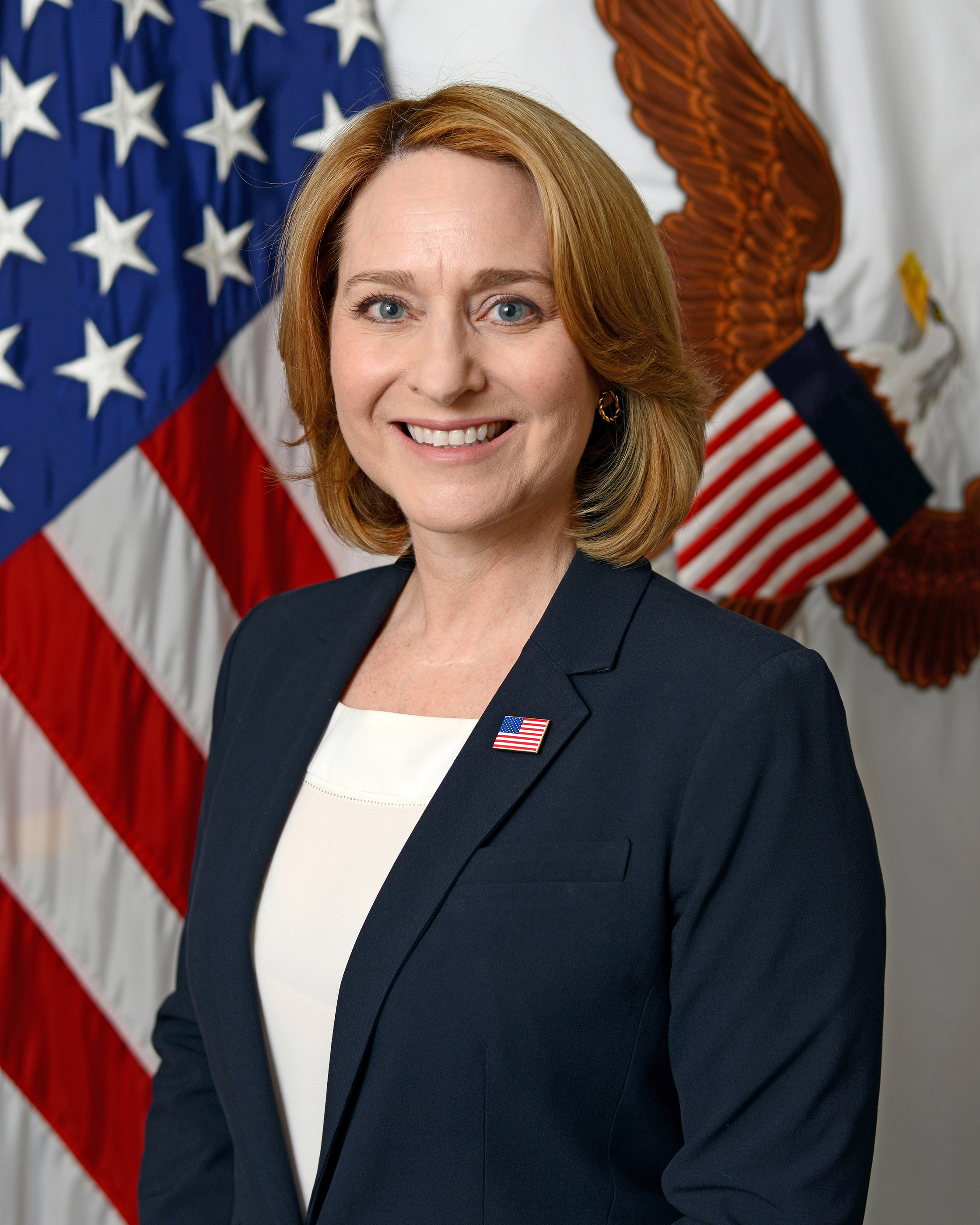
- Official portrait, 2023

35th United States Deputy Secretary of Defense
- In office February 9, 2021 – January 20, 2025
- President: Joe Biden
- Preceded by: David Norquist
- Succeeded by: Steve Feinberg

9th Principal Deputy Under Secretary of Defense for Policy
- In office May 24, 2012 – July 2, 2013
- President: Barack Obama
- Preceded by: James N. Miller
- Succeeded by: Brian P. McKeon

Personal details
- Born: Kathleen Anne Holland; September 25, 1970 (age 56) Fairfield, California, U.S.
- Spouse: Thomas W. Hicks
- Children: 3
- Education: Mount Holyoke College (BA); University of Maryland, College Park (MPA); Massachusetts Institute of Technology (PhD)

Kathleen Anne Holland Hicks (born September 25, 1970) is a former American civil servant who served as the United States deputy secretary of defense from 2021 to 2025. She is the first Senate-confirmed woman in this role and is the highest-ranking woman to have served in the United States Department of Defense.

Hicks previously served as the principal deputy under secretary of defense for policy during the Obama administration. By 2020, Hicks was an academic and national security advisor working as a senior vice president and director of the international security program at the Center for Strategic and International Studies.

== Education ==
Hicks completed a B.A. in history and politics at Mount Holyoke College in 1991, where she graduated with magna cum laude and Phi Beta Kappa honors. In 1993, she earned an M.P.A. in national security studies at University of Maryland, College Park. Hicks completed a Ph.D. in political science from Massachusetts Institute of Technology in 2010. Her dissertation was titled Change Agents: Who Leads and Why in the Execution of U.S. National Security Policy. Charles Stewart III was Hicks' doctoral advisor.

== Career ==
From 1993 to 2006, Hicks was a career civil servant in the Office of the Secretary of Defense, rising from Presidential Management Fellow to the Senior Executive Service. She was a senior fellow at the Center for Strategic and International Studies (CSIS) from 2006 to 2009, leading a variety of national security research projects.

During the Obama administration in 2009, Hicks was appointed deputy undersecretary of defense for strategy, plans, and forces. In 2012, Hicks was the principal deputy under secretary of defense for policy during the Obama administration. In that role, she was a liaison for the 2010 Quadrennial Defense Review and oversaw the 2012 Defense Strategic Guidance. Hicks was a presidentially appointed commissioner for the National Commission on the Future of the Army. She was also appointed to the Commission on the National Defense Strategy of the United States. She is a Member of the Council on Foreign Relations and has served on the boards of The Aerospace Corporation and the U.S. Naval Institute, as well as the boards of advisors for the Truman National Security Project and SoldierStrong. Hicks formerly served as a senior vice president, Henry A. Kissinger Chair, and director of the international security program at CSIS. She concurrently served as the Donald Marron scholar at the Paul H. Nitze School of Advanced International Studies. In 2020, Hicks led the United States Department of Defense (DoD) agency review team, tasked with reviewing issues related to defense and national security during the presidential transition of Joe Biden.

=== United States Deputy Secretary of Defense ===
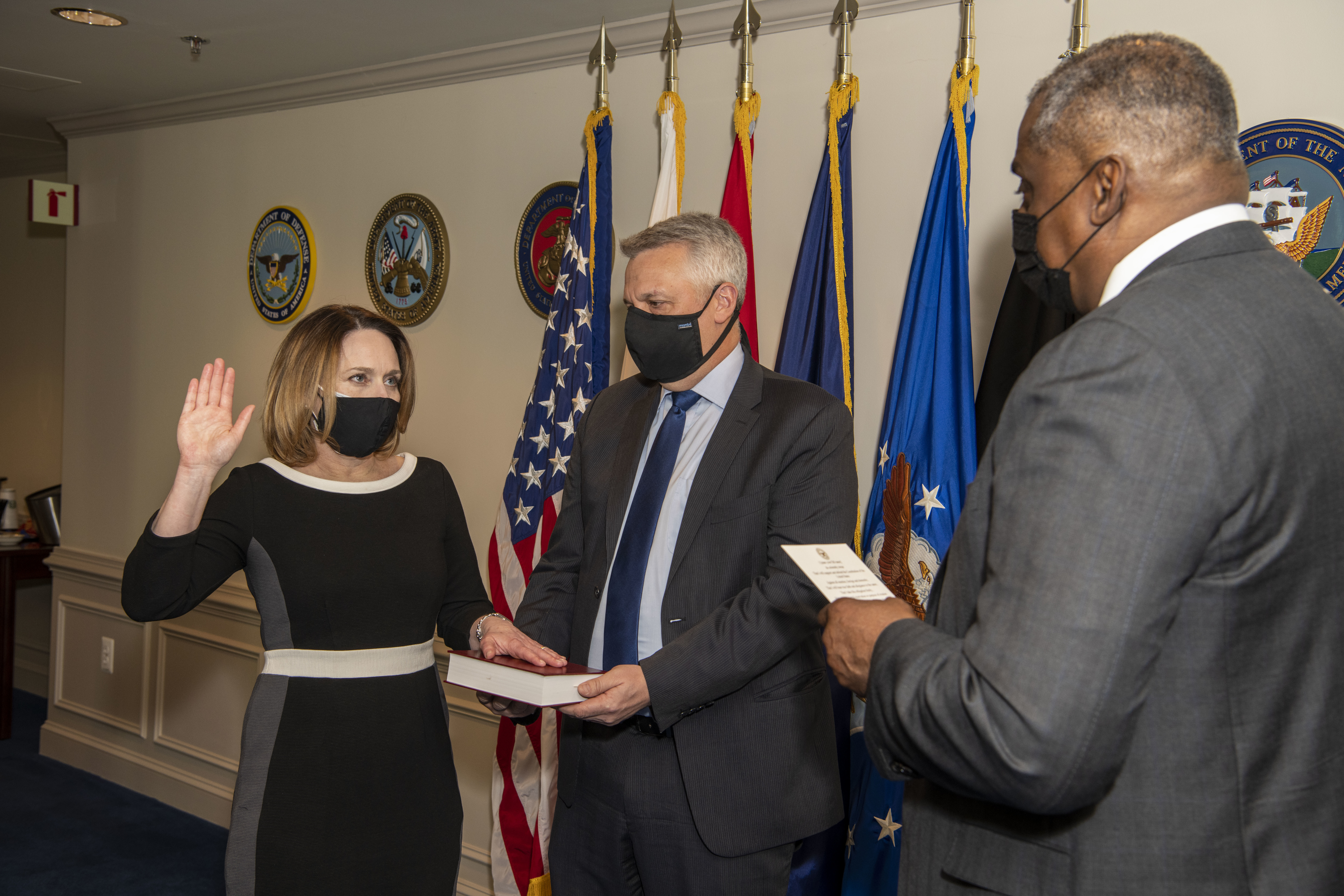
Hicks is sworn in as deputy secretary of defense, February 9, 2021.

On December 30, 2020, Hicks was announced as then U.S. President-elect Joe Biden's nominee for the United States deputy secretary of defense. She appeared before the Senate Armed Services Committee on February 2, 2021. She was confirmed by voice vote by the full Senate on February 8, 2021, and sworn into office on February 9, 2021. She is the first Senate-confirmed woman in this role. Hicks is the highest ranking woman to have served in the DoD.

Hicks has launched initiatives that attempt to shorten technology adoption timelines and speed fielding of new defense capabilities. She spearheaded Replicator, an initiative initially focused on fielding autonomous systems to help counter China's military. She oversees the military's first commercial space integration strategy, as well as several of the Pentagon's largest missile defense and long-range strike programs. She is also in charge of the military's efforts related to climate change. Hicks established the Deputy's Workforce Council in the DoD to address workforce challenges such as extremism and a lack of diversity. She has also focused on efforts to take care of service members and their families, including countering sexual assault and harassment and preventing suicide.

In January 2024, Hicks temporarily assumed the functions and duties of the secretary of defense while Lloyd Austin was hospitalized. Hicks performed the role of secretary of defense while vacationing in Puerto Rico, but was left unaware of the reason why for three days. In February 2024, Austin transferred his authority to Hicks while again being hospitalized.

== Selected works ==
- Hicks, Kathleen; Ridge, Eric (2007). Planning for Stability Operations: The Use of Capabilities-based Approaches. Center for Strategic and International Studies. ISBN 978-0-89206-515-8.
- Hicks, Kathleen H. (2008). Invigorating Defense Department Governance: A Beyond Goldwater-Nichols, Phase 4, Report. Center for Strategic and International Studies. ISBN 978-0-89206-528-8.
- Hicks, Kathleen H.; Wormuth, Christine E.; Ridge, Eric (2009). The Future of U.S. Civil Affairs Forces. Center for Strategic and International Studies. ISBN 978-0-89206-568-4.
- Alterman, Jon B.; Hicks, Kathleen H. (2015). Federated Defense in the Middle East. Rowman & Littlefield. ISBN 978-1-4422-5881-5.
- Hicks, Kathleen H.; Metrick, Andrew; Samp, Lisa Sawyer; Weinberger, Kathleen (August 2, 2016). Undersea Warfare in Northern Europe. Rowman & Littlefield. ISBN 978-1-4422-5968-3.
- Hicks, Kathleen H.; Samp, Lisa Sawyer (2017). Recalibrating U.S. Strategy toward Russia: A New Time for Choosing. Rowman & Littlefield. ISBN 978-1-4422-8006-9.
- Hicks, Kathleen H.; Lauter, Louis; McElhinny, Colin (2018). Beyond the Water's Edge: Measuring the Internationalism of Congress. Rowman & Littlefield. ISBN 978-1-4422-8088-5.

Political offices
| Preceded by David Norquist | United States Deputy Secretary of Defense; 2021–2025 | Succeeded by Steve Feinberg |
