= Jami Miscik =

American intelligence analyst

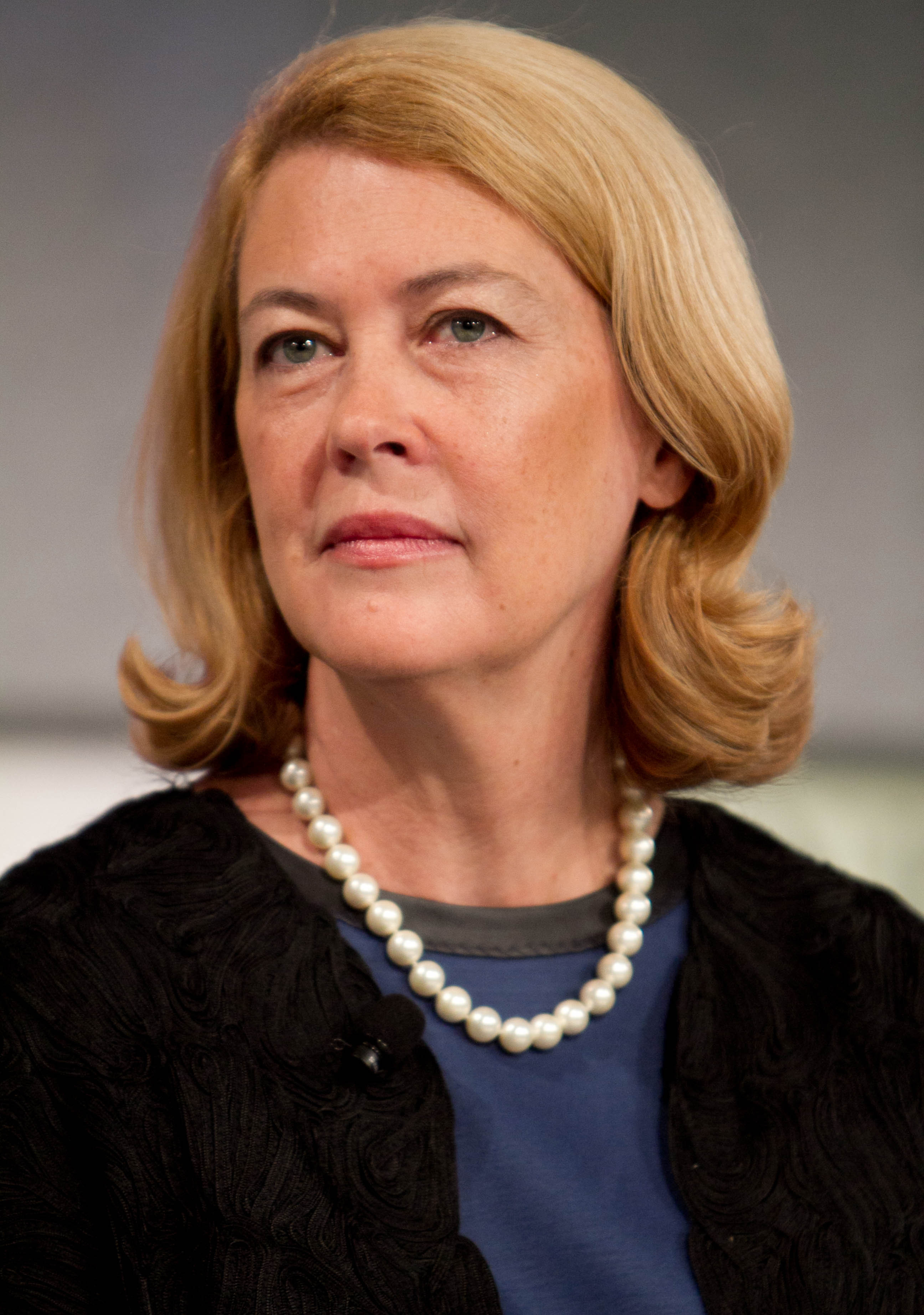

Chair of the President's Intelligence Advisory Board
- In office August 29, 2014 – January 20, 2017 Serving with Shirley Jackson
- President: Barack Obama
- Preceded by: David Boren (2013); Chuck Hagel
- Succeeded by: Steve Feinberg

Personal details
- Born: 1958 (age 67–68) Chicago, Illinois, U.S.
- Education: Pepperdine University (BA); University of Denver (MA)

Judith A. "Jami" Miscik (born 1958) is an American intelligence analyst who was also the Central Intelligence Agency's Deputy Director for Intelligence, the Agency's most senior analytic post. In 2005 she left CIA to become Global Head of Sovereign Risk for the now-bankrupt financial services firm Lehman Brothers. Miscik is former President and Vice-Chairman of Kissinger Associates, Inc. in New York and currently CEO of Global Strategic Insights, a private consulting firm. In 2009 she was appointed to President Obama's Intelligence Advisory Board.

== Agency career ==
Jami Miscik began her CIA career in 1983 as an economic analyst, working on Third World debt and the analysis of political instability before leading Directorate of Intelligence analytic programs on economic competitiveness and civil technologies. While at the CIA, Miscik ran a complex quantitative and qualitative program to forecast political instability in 40 countries based on 25 indicators.

From 1995 to 1996, she was seconded to the National Security Council as Director for Intelligence Programs, where she had oversight responsibility for covert action programs and special reconnaissance missions. From 1996 to 1997 she was executive assistant to George Tenet, who in July 1997 was sworn in as director after having served two years as deputy director. In January 1998 Miscik became the deputy director of the Nonproliferation Center and in January 1999 Director of Transnational Issues.

Between 2002 and 2005 Miscik served as the CIA's Deputy Director for Intelligence, during which time she was responsible for all CIA analysis and for preparation of the President's Daily Brief, an exclusive intelligence compilation that goes only to the President and select senior members of his national security team. During the run-up to the Iraq War she was one of a number of CIA officials who pushed back against the efforts to link Saddam Hussein and Al-Qaeda. In January 2003 she threatened to resign in protest of the pressure exerted by Scooter Libby, then the chief of staff to Vice President Dick Cheney. In February 2005, she joined the exodus of senior CIA officials that followed the arrival of Porter Goss as Director of Central Intelligence.

== After the CIA ==
Miscik joined Lehman Brothers in June 2005, where she served as Global Head of Sovereign Risk and was the subject of a flattering profile in Fortune magazine. Following the collapse of Lehman Brothers in September, 2008, she remained briefly with Barclays, which had bought Lehman's North American Business. With the victory of Barack Obama in the November 2008 presidential election, Miscik returned to Washington for a short stint, working on the intelligence transition. In January, 2009, she was named Vice-Chairman of Kissinger Associates, Inc, which she left in June 2022 to become CEO of Global Strategic Insights, a private consulting firm focused on advising on geopolitical and macroeconomic issues.

== Background and public service ==
Miscik was born in Chicago and grew up in Redondo Beach, California. She received her B.A. with honors from Pepperdine University in Political Science and Economics in 1980 and an M.A. in International Studies from the Josef Korbel School of International Studies at the University of Denver in 1982. She serves on the boards of General Motors, EMC Corporation, Morgan Stanley, Pivotal Labs, In-Q-Tel , the Council on Foreign Relations, and the American Ditchley Foundation. In October 2022, she joined as a senior adviser to the newly formed geopolitical advisory team at the asset management firm Lazard.

Government offices
Vacant Title last held by David Boren; Chuck Hagel	Chair of the President's Intelligence Advisory Board; 2014–2017; Served alongside: Shirley Jackson	Succeeded by Steve Feinberg
