= Cerberus Capital Management =

U.S. investment management company

Cerberus Capital Management, L.P.

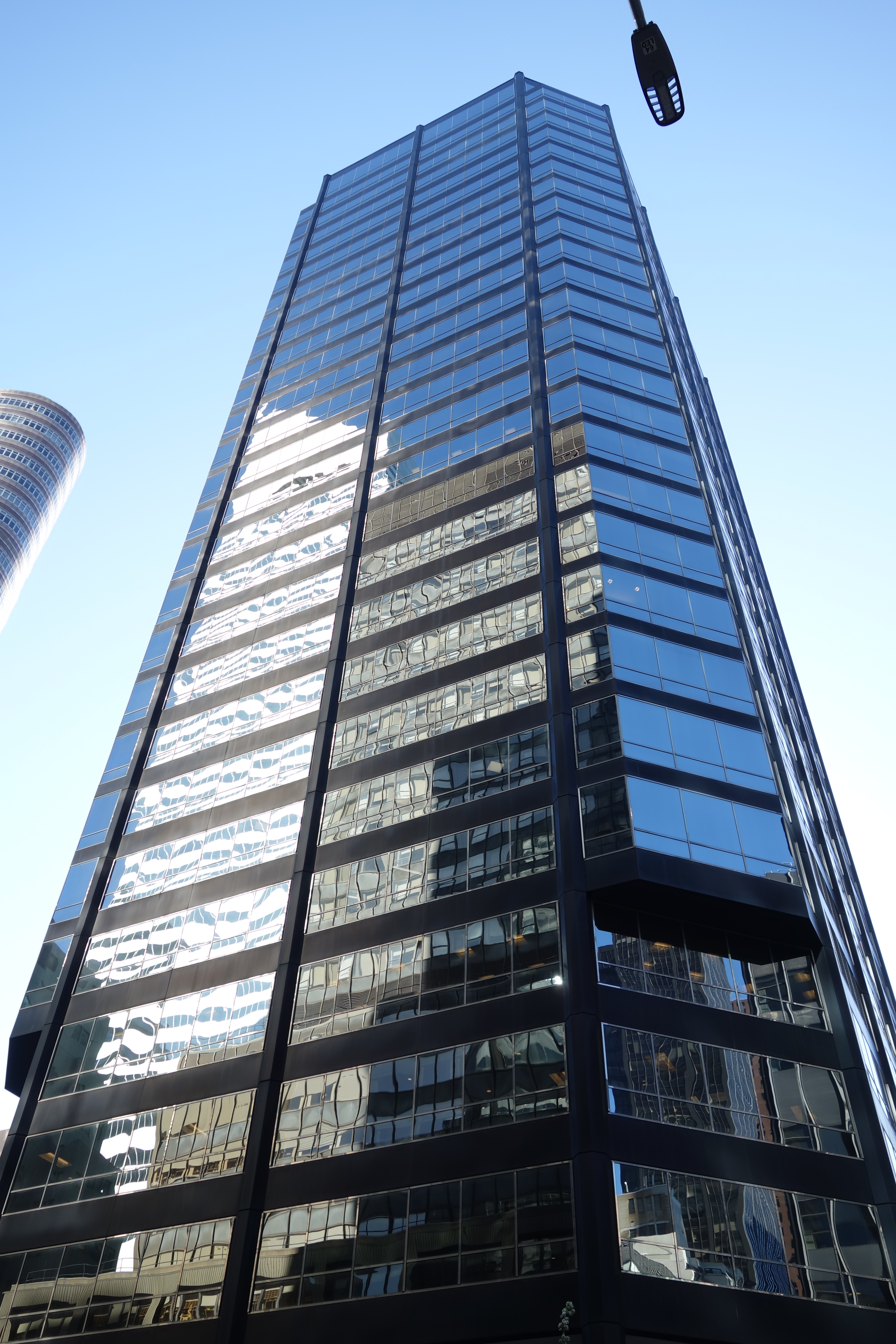
- Headquarters at 875 Third Avenue
- Type: Private
- Industry: Private equity
- Founded: 1992; 34 years ago
- Founder: Steve Feinberg; William L. Richter
- Headquarters: New York City, U.S.
- Area served: 11 offices in 9 countries
- Key people: Frank W. Bruno (CEO); Dan Quayle (chairman of Global Investments); John W. Snow (chairman of Capital Management)
- Products: Distressed securities and assets, Leveraged buyouts, Growth capital, Real estate investing, Commercial lending
- AUM: $70 billion
- Subsidiaries: Cerberus Operations and Advisory Company LLC
- Website: cerberus.com

Cerberus Capital Management, L.P. is an American global alternative investment firm with assets across credit, private equity, and real estate strategies. The firm is based in New York City, and run by Steve Feinberg, who co-founded Cerberus in 1992, with William L. Richter, who serves as a senior managing director. The firm has offices in the United States, Europe and Asia. Cerberus has around US$70 billion under management in funds and accounts, as of July 2026.

In 2019, Cerberus ranked as the 25th-largest U.S. defense contractor, receiving approximately $1.9 billion in federal contract awards.

== History ==
Cerberus is named after the three-headed dog that guards the gates of the Underworld in Greek mythology. Feinberg has stated that while the Cerberus name seemed like a good idea at the time, he later regretted naming the company after the mythological beast.

Dan Quayle, former Vice President of the United States 1989–1993, who served under President George H. W. Bush, joined Cerberus in 1999 and is chairman of the company's Global Investments Division.

Cerberus has grown to include 11 offices in nine countries. Cerberus's largest locations include New York City, Chicago, and Boise, Idaho.

The firm is active in private equity investment, lending, specialty finance, real estate investment, and securities trading. The firm's current investment portfolio includes more than 40 companies around the world with an average hold time of more than five years.

Cerberus founder Steve Feinberg joined the second Donald Trump administration where he became deputy secretary of defense, the second-highest ranking position in the Pentagon. Feinberg filed paperwork saying he divested from Cerberus, but the paperwork included a clause showing he retains a financial relationship with the firm. After Feinberg took his position at Pentagon, the Pentagon contracted with at least four firms owned by Cerberus.

== Transactions and initiatives ==
- In the summer of 2007, Cerberus agreed to buy United Rentals, the world's largest equipment rental company that was traded on the NYSE. After the credit markets began to tighten in August, Cerberus decided not to make the acquisition, agreeing to pay United Rentals a $100 million "reverse termination fee" that the parties had negotiated and included in their agreement. United Rentals sued in the Delaware Court of Chancery for specific performance (i.e., a court mandate that Cerberus complete the deal). Cerberus cited the clear language contained in the deal agreement that capped its liability for not completing the transaction at $100 million. After a two-day trial, Delaware Chancellor William B. Chandler, III, ruled in favor of Cerberus, writing in his ruling that "URI knew or should have known what Cerberus' understanding of the merger agreement was." In a public statement, Cerberus said it was "gratified" by the court's ruling and was "pleased that the court chose to decide the case on the merits and confirm that Cerberus acted in accordance with its rights and obligations."
- On March 10, 2010, Cerberus entered into a financing deal with GeoEye in which the firm would provide the satellite imagery company funds of up to $215 million.
- In March 2010, Cerberus was the lead investor that gained an ownership stake in Panavision as part of a debt restructuring agreement with shareholder MacAndrews & Forbes, the holding company of billionaire Ronald Perelman.
- In March 2010, Cerberus agreed to buy New England's largest community-based healthcare system, the not-for-profit Caritas Christi Health Care, for $246 million, then withdrew its non-profit registration and changed its name to Steward Health Care that November. This ultimately led to the company being a direct cause of two local hospitals closing due to buying the land underneath under a different company (Medical Properties Trust) and funneled over $50 million to their investors. One of the two hospitals that was closed is Nashoba Valley Medical Center. They ultimately charged so much for the land of the hospitals that they had to close in 2024. This is still going on as of March 2025 to other hospitals, acquiring the land underneath hospitals the same way and extricating every penny they can from the hospital in "rent".
- On April 12, 2010, Cerberus acquired private government services contractor DynCorp International for approximately $1 billion and the assumption of $500 million of debt. The company was sold.
- In June 2010, Cerberus agreed to sell Talecris to Spain's Grifols S.A. The transaction closed on June 1, 2011 at a value of $4.2 billion.
- On November 19, 2010, Cerberus and Drago Capital acquired a real estate portfolio of 97 bank branches from Spain's fourth largest financial group, Caja Madrid, in a 25-year leaseback transaction.
- On March 17, 2011, Cerberus acquired the senior bank debt and completed a debt restructuring of Maxim Office Park, a one million square foot office and logistics complex located between Glasgow and Edinburgh, Scotland.
- On March 31, 2011, Cerberus acquired a real estate portfolio consisting of 45 Metro Cash & Carry properties in Germany from the three major shareholders of Metro AG.
- On May 16, 2011, Cerberus completed the acquisition of Silverleaf Resorts, for $2.50 in cash per share.
- On May 16, 2011, an affiliate of Cerberus agreed to acquire the U.S.-based global billing and payments unit of 3i Infotech Ltd. for $137 million.
- On October 4, 2011, Cerberus and Garanti Securities announced the formation of a joint initiative to pursue investments in Turkey with an initial commitment of $400 million.
- On October 19, 2011, J.P. Morgan Worldwide Securities Services announced that it was selected by Cerberus to provide fund administration and related securities services for Cerberus's investment funds.
- On October 27, 2011, Cerberus and Chatham Lodging Trust closed their purchase of Innkeepers USA Trust for $1.02 billion. Innkeepers operates hotels, including the Marriott, Hyatt, Hilton, and other brands.
- On December 22, 2011, Covis Pharma, a specialty pharmaceutical company owned by affiliates of Cerberus, announced that it had agreed to acquire full commercial rights for Fortaz (ceftazidime), Zinacef (cefuroxime), Lanoxin (digoxin), Parnate (tranylcypromine sulfate), and Zantac injection (ranitidine hydrochloride) in the United States and Puerto Rico from GlaxoSmithKline.
- On January 18, 2012, RG Steel, LLC announced that affiliates of Cerberus committed new capital to the company.
- On March 8, 2012, an affiliate of Cerberus closed its acquisition of a controlling interest in AT&T Advertising Solutions and AT&T Interactive, which were combined into a new entity YP Holdings LLC. AT&T received approximately $750 million in cash, a $200 million note and a 47-percent equity interest in YP Holdings LLC. David Krantz, former CEO and president of AT&T Interactive, was named CEO of YP.
- On May 31, 2012, Cerberus completed the sale of textile company Guilford Mills to Lear Corporation.
- On December 18, 2012, the company announced that it would divest its assets in Remington Outdoor Company, formerly Freedom Group. However, as of September 24, 2013, it had not sold any of the Remington Outdoor Company.
- In January 2013, it announced a deal to acquire 877 stores in the Albertsons, Acme, Jewel-Osco, Shaw's, and Star Market chains from SuperValu for $100 million and assumption of $3.2 billion of SuperValu debt.
- September 16, 2013, Cerberus closed Accurate Metal Solutions (AMS). Over 400 employees were laid off.
- On March 6, 2014, Cerberus announced a definitive merger agreement with already owned Albertsons and Safeway.
- On November 13, 2015, Cerberus agreed a deal to buy £13 billion ($16.5 billion) of subprime mortgages from UK Asset Resolution (UKAR).
- On December 17, 2015, Cerberus announced a $605 million strategic partnership with Avon Products, Inc. According to terms of the agreement, Cerberus will buy 80% of Avon North America. In addition, the investment will result in a nearly 17% stake in Avon Products, Inc.
- On January 26, 2016, Keane, a well completion services company owned by Cerberus, agreed to acquire the majority of Canada-based Trican Well Services Ltd.'s U.S. assets for $247 million.
- On May 27, 2016, Cerberus sold its 57% stake in Blue Bird Corporation, an independent designer and manufacturer of school buses, to an affiliate of American Securities.
- On June 23, 2016, General Electric announced a sale of its consumer finance business, GE Money Bank, to an affiliate of Cerberus.
- On July 1, 2016, Cerberus acquired auto parts supplier ABC Group.
- On December 7, 2016, Staples, Inc. and Cerberus announced they had entered into an agreement in relation to the sale of a controlling interest in Staples' European operations to a Cerberus affiliate.
- In February 2018, Cerberus acquired HSH Nordbank.
- On November 1, 2018, Cerberus announced the acquisition of SGI Frontier Capital, a private equity firm focused on emerging markets, founded by Gabriel Schulze.
- In October 2019, Cerberus acquired Stratolaunch Systems, an aerospace company formed by Microsoft co-founder Paul G. Allen in 2011 that has built the world's largest airplane (by wingspan): the Stratolaunch After the acquisition, Stratolaunch is now focusing on offering high-speed flight test services.
- In March 2020, Cerberus faced backlash after threatening to close the unprofitable Easton Hospital in Lehigh Valley, Pennsylvania, amid the coronavirus pandemic.
- In October 2021, Cerberus sold the securitization fund manager Haya Titulización to Beka Finance.
- In November 2022, Cerberus acquired the Agila Subic Shipyard ahead of an impending return of more frequent visits by U.S. Navy vessels to the area of Central Luzon in the Philippines, amid rising tensions with China.

== Additional involvements by sector ==
=== Pharmaceuticals ===
In December 2004, the company announced the acquisition of Bayer's plasma products business and renamed it Talecris Biotherapeutics. It purchased Talecris for $83m, and sold the bulk of its shares in October 2009, for a net gain of $1.8bn.

=== Paper products ===
The company acquired MeadWestvaco's paper business for $2.3B in 2005 and renamed it NewPage. Cerberus also purchased, from Georgia Pacific Corporation, its Distribution Division/Building Products and all of its associated real estate. It renamed this new company BlueLinx Holdings, based in Atlanta.

=== Aviation ===
The Portuguese company TAP Portugal was bought by a consortium that included David Neeleman (Founder of Azul Linhas Aéreas Brasileiras, JetBlue Airways and WestJet) and Humberto Pedrosa.

=== Government services (military, energy, and food & drug) ===
Cerberus owns IAP Worldwide Services, which bought Johnson Controls' World Services division in February 2005. Previously owned Multimax (purchased predecessor company in 2000 and Multimax in 2006; sold entire holding in 2007 to Harris Corporation). Cerberus owns Tier 1 Group, a private company that provides military training.

=== Real estate ===
Through investment affiliate Cerberus Real Estate, the company has been making direct equity, mezzanine, first mortgage, distressed and special situation investments in all asset types. Cerberus also has a minority stake in Miami Beach-based LNR Property, a large real estate development and investment firm through subsidiary Riley Property. In October 2015 Cerberus completed an acquisition from Building and Land Technology of a portfolio of single family rental homes to be managed by its affiliated company, FirstKey Homes, LLC; there are currently more than 6,000 homes in the portfolio.

=== Retail ===
Cerberus purchased 655 of the 2,500 Albertson's, Inc., grocery stores, forming Albertsons LLC of Boise, Idaho, in June 2006. It also had an ownership stake in the now-bankrupt Mervyn's department stores, which was acquired from Target Corp. In May 2012, Cerberus sold its holdings in Torex Retail Holdings, Ltd., a Dunstable, England-based provider of information technology systems for the retail, fuel and convenience stores and pub markets in the United Kingdom and Continental Europe that was acquired in June 2007, to MICROS Systems, Inc. In January 2013, it announced a deal to acquire 877 stores in the Albertson's, Acme, Shaw's and Star Market chains from SuperValu for $100 million and acquisition of $3.2 billion on SuperValu debt. In February 2014, it was reported that Safeway Inc was in advanced talks with private equity firm Cerberus Capital Management LP over a leveraged buyout deal. After integrating the Safeway purchase, on October 14, 2022 Kroger announced it would be acquiring Albertsons for $25 billion, combining the largest and second-largest supermarket chains in North America. The deal faced legal challenges and was never completed.

=== Transportation ===
Acquired bankrupt ANC Rental, then owner of the National and Alamo car rental chains, for $230 million in October 2003, and subsequently sold to Enterprise Rent-a-Car in 2007. Purchased DaimlerChrysler's 45% share of debis AirFinance, an aircraft leasing business, in May 2005. Acquisition of debis AirFinance (later renamed AerCap) was completed in July 2005. AerCap completed its IPO in 2006. Cerberus also acquired North American Bus Industries, Optima Bus Corporation, and Blue Bird Corp. in the bus manufacturing sector. (Cerberus sold its commercial bus manufacturing assets to New Flyer Industries in 2013 but retained the Blue Bird school bus production line.)

=== Automotive ===
Peguform (acquired by Cerberus in 2004 and sold it to Polytec four years later), GDX Automotive (owned by Cerberus until 2011), and Chrysler.

In 2007, Cerberus and about 100 other investors purchased an 80% stake in Chrysler for $7.4 billion seeking to bolster the auto maker's performance by operating as an independent company. In 2008, the plan collapsed due to an unprecedented slowdown in the U.S. auto industry and a lack of capital.

In response to questioning at a hearing before the House committee on December 5, 2008 by Rep. Ginny Brown-Waite, Chrysler President and CEO Robert Nardelli said that Cerberus' fiduciary obligations to its other investors and investments prohibited it from injecting capital. "In order to achieve that goal Cerberus has advised the U.S. Treasury that it would contribute its equity in Chrysler automotive to labor and creditors as currency to facilitate the accommodations necessary to affect the restructuring."

On April 30, 2009, Chrysler declared bankruptcy protection and announced that GMAC would become the financing source for new wholesale and retail Chrysler cars.

On March 30, 2009, Cerberus Capital Management announced that it would voluntarily give up its equity stake in the Chrysler as a condition of the US Treasury Department's bailout deal, but would retain its stake in Chrysler's financing arm, Chrysler Financial. Cerberus agreed to provide $2 billion to backstop a $4 billion December 2008 US Treasury Department loan given to Chrysler. In exchange for obtaining that loan, it promised many concessions including surrendering equity, foregoing profits, and giving up board seats. US Treasury and the Obama administration recognized the "sacrifices by key stakeholders" in an effort to give Chrysler the "opportunity to thrive as a long-term viable 21st century company".

Chrysler Financial, once the exclusive lending arm of the automaker, remained owned by Cerberus until April 2011.

Chrysler Financial initially refused to take $750 million in Troubled Asset Relief Program (TARP) government bailout aid because executives didn't want to abide by executive-pay limits, and because the firm doesn't necessarily need the money. In January 2009, Chrysler Financial was the recipient of $1.5 billion from the Troubled Asset Relief Program. The company said that it used the money to fund 85,000 loans to purchase Chrysler automobiles. Chrysler Financial repaid all of the TARP loan in July 2009 by raising funds from an asset-backed securitization through the Term Asset-Backed Securities Loan Facility program.

In December 2010, Cerberus agreed to sell certain assets of Chrysler Financial to TD Bank Group for $6.3 billion in cash, retaining approximately $1 billion in Chrysler Financial assets. This transaction, which closed in April 2011, allowed Cerberus to recover virtually all of its investment in Chrysler.

Filings indicate the company is involved with Towd Point Auto, which is a holding company that absorbs bad debit from Carvana.

=== Financial services ===
Cerberus acquired 51% of GMAC, General Motors' finance arm, in 2006 for $7.4 billion. It appointed Ezra Merkin as nonexecutive Chairman.

On December 10, 2008, GMAC said, "GMAC LLC, the auto and home lender seeking federal aid, hasn't obtained enough capital to become a bank holding company and may abandon the effort, casting new doubt on the firm's ability to survive. A $38 billion debt exchange by GMAC and its Residential Capital LLC mortgage unit to reduce the company's outstanding debt and raise capital hasn't attracted enough participation." GMAC's exposure to the gap in residual values was around $3.5 billion.

In December 2008, Cerberus subsequently informed GMAC's bondholders that the financial services company may have to file for bankruptcy if a bond-exchange plan is not approved. The company had previously said it may fail in its quest to become a bank holding company because it lacks adequate capital. In January 2009, Merkin resigned from his chairmanship as a condition by the U.S. government. Five days earlier, the Federal Reserve granted GMAC bank holding company status, so it could get access to the bailout money. On December 29, 2008, the U.S. Treasury gave GMAC $5 billion from its $700 billion Troubled Asset Relief Program (TARP). (On May 21, 2009, the US Treasury department announced it would invest an additional $7.5 billion in GMAC, and on December 30, 2009, the US Treasury department said that they would invest another $3.8 billion in GMAC because the company had been unable to raise additional funds in the private sector. This raised the total government investment in GMAC to $16.3 billion.)

Cerberus's investments in Chrysler and GMAC totaled about 7% of its assets under management. At the end of May 2009, Cerberus scaled back their ownership of GMAC as a condition of the lender becoming a bank-holding company, when the bulk of GM's existing ownership stake in GMAC was placed into a trust, overseen by a trustee appointed by the Treasury, to be gradually dispersed. Cerberus distributed the majority of its stake in GMAC to its investors. The Federal Deposit Insurance Corporation (FDIC) gave GMAC access to the Temporary Liquidity Guarantee Program that allows companies to borrow money at lower interest rates. The initiative was created in October 2008 to help banks borrow money by promising to repay investors if the banks defaulted. The U.S. Government also waived a rule that would restrict the amount of loans that GMAC could make to Chrysler's customers and dealers because both firms are owned in part by Cerberus Capital Management.

In December 2006, Cerberus acquired the Austrian bank BAWAG P.S.K. for a reported EUR3.2 billion. In August 2007, Cerberus announced that it was closing one of their mortgage companies, Aegis Mortgage. It owned half of a 9.9% share (5%) with the Gabriel Group in Bank Leumi, purchased in 2005, but as of April 19, 2009, it was decided to sell in order to boost capital. Cerberus also has a controlling interest in Japanese bank Aozora.

In Australia, Cerberus purchased Bluestone Mortgages (specialist mortgage lending and servicing) in 2018, Angle Finance (equipment finance) in 2019 and Westpac Group's Strategic Alliances (Vendor Finance) in 2020.

=== Firearms ===
Cerberus acquired Bushmaster Firearms International, from Windham, Maine native Dick Dyke for an undisclosed sum in April 2006, and purchased Remington Arms in April 2007. Under Cerberus's direction, Bushmaster Firearms acquired Cobb Manufacturing, a manufacturer of large-caliber tactical rifles, in August 2007. Cerberus also acquired DPMS Panther Arms on December 14, 2007. Remington Arms acquired Marlin Firearms in January 2008. In October 2009, Remington Military products acquired silencer manufacturer Advanced Armament Corporation. These companies were combined into the Remington Outdoor Company. Cerberus made plans to sell its share in the Remington Outdoor Company on December 18, 2012, after the Bushmaster AR-15 was used in the Sandy Hook Elementary School shooting. This decision was made due to a threat by the board of the California state teachers' pension plan, which owns a stake in the company, to dispose of stakes it holds in any firearms manufacturer that makes weapons banned by California state law. In March 2014, Cerberus rejected a $1 billion buyout offer for Remington Outdoor Company and thereafter was unable to find a satisfactory buyer. Cerberus continued to have ownership in Remington Outdoor Company, and CalSTRS announced its divestment from Cerberus' gun holdings in June 2015. In March 2018, Freedom Group, now known as Remington Outdoor Company, sought chapter 11 bankruptcy protection.

=== Entertainment ===
Acquired a group of seven television stations using a holding company known as Four Points Media Group, from CBS Corporation in 2007. On September 8, 2011, Cerberus announced the sale of these same seven stations to the Sinclair Broadcast Group for $200 million; this sale was completed on January 1, 2012.

- Spyglass Entertainment, an American film and production company, is also owned by Cerberus.
- In 2007, Cerberus bought Corvest a promotional products company based in Largo, Florida with branches in Simi Valley, California & Thorofare, New Jersey.

== See also ==
- Top 100 US Federal Contractors
- M1 Support Services

== Notes and references ==
Notes

References

- Kelley, Matt. "The Congressman and the hedge fund." USA Today. January 19, 2006.
- Thornton, Emily. "What's Bigger Than Cisco, Coke, Or McDonald's?" Business Week October 2005.
- Stringer, Kortney. "Car Rental Companies are sold." Wall Street Journal. October 16, 2003.
- "Acquisition of LNR Property Corporation Completed" Business Wire. February 3, 2005.
- "Hirsch, Jerry. "Albertsons To Be Sold, Divided Into 3." Los Angeles Times. January 24, 2006.
- Bushmaster Continues to Grow with New Owner
- "Acquisition of debis AirFinance Completed," press release from AerCap, July 4, 2005.
- "Cerberus Takes Over Majority Interest in Chrysler Group for $7.4B," press release from DaimlerChrysler AG.
