= BlueLinx =

American building products wholesaler

BlueLinx Holdings Inc.
- Type: Public
- Traded as: NYSE: BXC; Russell 2000 Index component
- Industry: Wholesaling
- Founded: 2004; 22 years ago
- Headquarters: Atlanta, Georgia, United States
- Number of locations: 70 warehouses
- Products: Building products
- Revenue: $3.236 billion (2017 Pro forma)
- Net income: $71.4 million (2017 Pro forma)
- Total assets: $893.0 million (2017 Pro forma)
- Total equity: $43.2 million (2017 Pro forma)
- Number of employees: 2,500 (2018)
- Website: www.bluelinxco.com

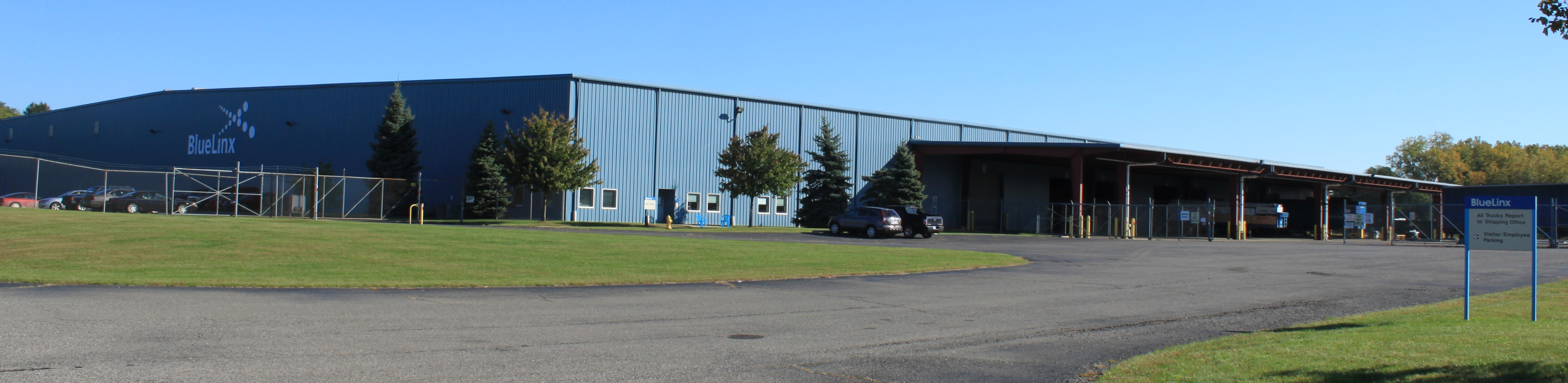
BlueLinx warehouse, Ypsilanti Township, Michigan

BlueLinx Holdings Inc. is a wholesale distributor of building and industrial products in the United States. Headquartered in Atlanta, Georgia, Shyam Reddy serves as its president and CEO.

== History ==
BlueLinx was formed in May 2004, when senior management purchased the assets of the distribution division from Georgia-Pacific. Cerberus Capital Management provided the equity financing and became majority owner.

The distribution division of Georgia-Pacific Corporation began operations in 1954 with 13 warehouses used for storage and distribution of Georgia-Pacific plywood. Over the next 40 years, the division grew to over 130 warehouses nationwide, offering a wide range of products. In 1994, the division consolidated its warehouses and created two large sales and operations centers in Denver, Colorado and Atlanta, Georgia for the purposes of operational efficiency.

BlueLinx completed its initial public offering on the New York Stock Exchange on December 14, 2004.

On October 18, 2017, BlueLinx Holdings Inc., Cerberus Capital Management, and BTIG as underwriter, entered into an underwriting agreement. Cerberus sold 3,863,850 shares, or about 49% of the company's common stock at a price of $7.00 per share.

On March 9, 2018, BlueLinx entered into a planned merger agreement to buy Cedar Creek Holdings from Charlesbank Equity. The merger closed on April 13, 2018.

In 2022, BlueLinx acquired Vandermeer Forest Products.

The company's operations now consist of a network of over 60 distribution centers located throughout the U.S.
