= David Norquist =

American government official (born 1966)

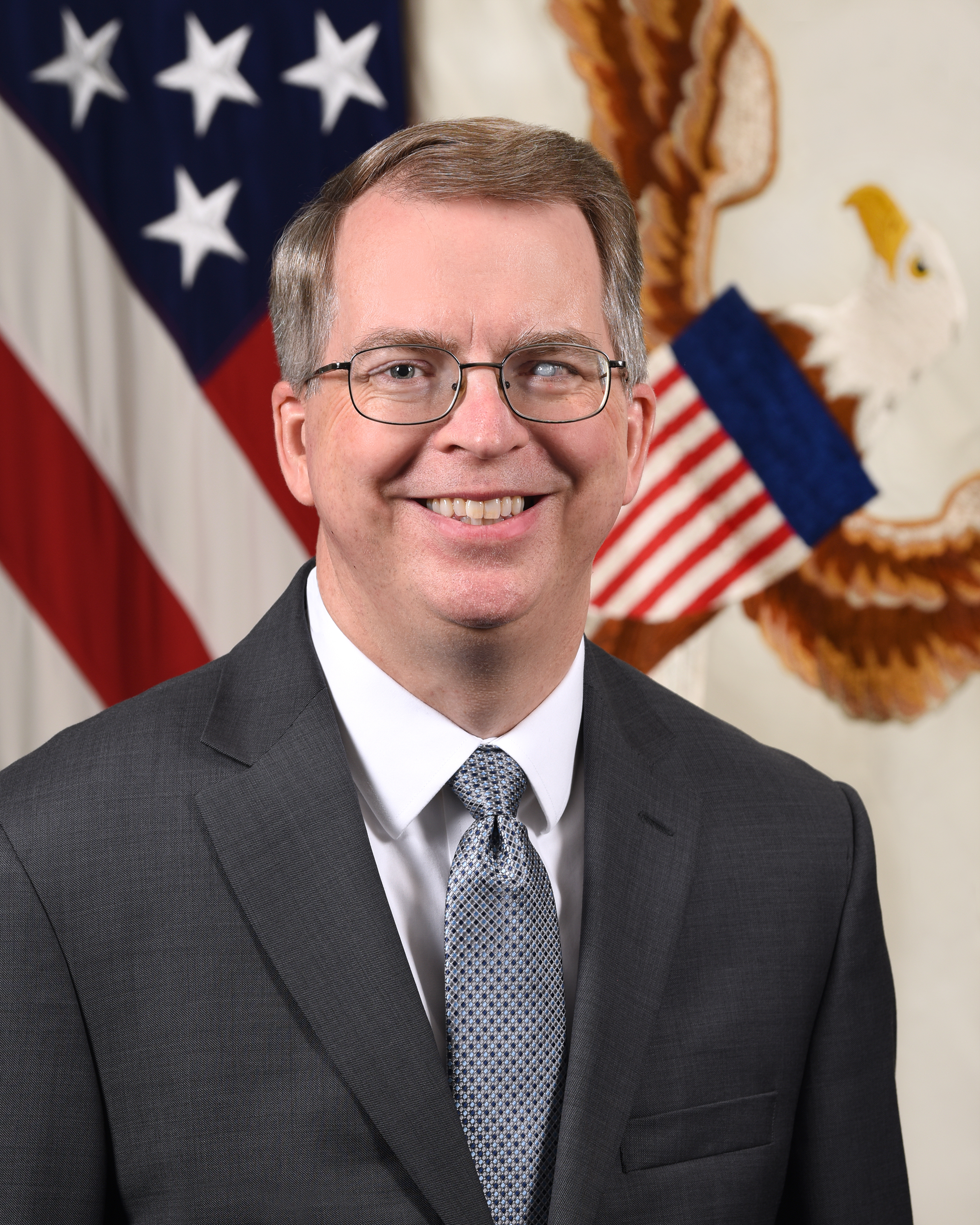
- Official portrait, 2019

Acting United States Secretary of Defense
- In office January 20, 2021 – January 22, 2021
- President: Joe Biden
- Preceded by: Christopher C. Miller (acting)
- Succeeded by: Lloyd Austin

34th United States Deputy Secretary of Defense
- In office July 31, 2019 – February 8, 2021
- President: Donald Trump; Joe Biden
- Preceded by: Patrick Shanahan
- Succeeded by: Kathleen Hicks
- Acting; January 1, 2019 – July 23, 2019
- President: Donald Trump
- Preceded by: Patrick Shanahan
- Succeeded by: Richard V. Spencer (acting)

7th Under Secretary of Defense (Comptroller)/CFO
- In office June 2, 2017 – July 31, 2019
- President: Donald Trump
- Preceded by: Michael J. McCord
- Succeeded by: Michael J. McCord

Chief Financial Officer of the United States Department of Homeland Security
- In office June 1, 2006 – December 1, 2008
- President: George W. Bush
- Preceded by: Andrew Maner
- Succeeded by: Margaret Sherry

Personal details
- Born: November 24, 1966 (age 59) Concord, Massachusetts, U.S.
- Party: Republican
- Spouse: Stephanie
- Children: 3
- Relatives: Grover Norquist (brother)
- Education: University of Michigan (BA, MPP); Georgetown University (MA)

David Lutz Norquist (born November 24, 1966) is an American financial management professional and former government official who served as the 34th United States deputy secretary of defense from 2019 to 2021. In May 2022, Norquist was selected as the president and chief executive officer of the National Defense Industrial Association (NDIA).

== Early life and education ==
Norquist graduated from the University of Michigan with a Bachelor of Arts (BA) in Political Science and a Master of Public Policy (MPP) in 1989. In 1995, he received a Master of Arts (MA) in National Security Studies from Georgetown University. He is the brother of lobbyist Grover Norquist.

== Career ==
Norquist began his career in 1989 as a Presidential Management Fellow and GS-9 Program Budget Analyst, a federal civil servant position for the Department of the Army; he served in that position for four years. From 1993 to 1995, he was a budget analyst in the U.S. Army Intelligence and Security Command. Norquist was Director of Resource Management at Menwith Hill Station in Harrogate, United Kingdom for the U.S. Army Intelligence and Security Command from 1995 to 1996. For six years, between 1997 and 2002, Norquist worked as a staffer on the Subcommittee on Defense for the House Appropriations Committee. Between 2002 and 2006, he was Deputy Undersecretary of Defense in the Office of the Under Secretary of Defense Comptroller of the Department of Defense.

In 2006, Norquist was selected by President George W. Bush to be Chief Financial Officer at the Department of Homeland Security. He served in this position from June 1, 2006 to December 1, 2008. As the first person to be confirmed by the Senate for that position, he took steps to address widespread problems with DHS's financial statements.

In 2008, Norquist joined Kearney & Company, a certified public accounting firm, as a partner.

On March 20, 2017, President Donald Trump announced his intention to nominate Norquist to be Under Secretary of Defense (Comptroller)/Chief Financial Officer in the Department of Defense. He was confirmed by the U.S. Senate on May 25, 2017 by unanimous consent and began serving on June 2, 2017. As Comptroller, he oversaw DoD's first-ever department-wide audit of $2.7 trillion in assets, which involved over 1,000 outside auditors and discovered "major flaws" but no "major cases of fraud or abuse."

== Deputy Secretary of Defense ==
Following the December 2018 resignation of Jim Mattis as secretary of defense, deputy secretary Patrick Shanahan was made the acting secretary of defense and Norquist was made acting deputy secretary. He served as acting deputy for several months before being formally nominated for the position. After Shanahan suddenly resigned on June 18, 2019, President Trump announced his intention to nominate Army secretary Mark Esper to be defense secretary. On June 21, the president announced his intention to nominate Norquist to be deputy secretary. His nomination was sent to the Senate on July 23, and he was confirmed by voice vote on July 30, 2019, after having acted in the role for nearly seven months.

Norquist pledged to shake up the defense budget and to place a high priority on funding research and development of cutting-edge technologies such as hypersonics and artificial intelligence. On August 2, 2019, he signed a memo to department leaders ordering a comprehensive, "zero-based" program and budget review for 2021 to 2025.

=== Acting Secretary of Defense ===
Norquist became the acting secretary of defense on January 20, 2021, and served in that role until Lloyd Austin, the Biden administration's nominee, was confirmed by the Senate on January 22.

== Personal life ==
Norquist and his wife, Stephanie, have three children. He is the younger brother of Grover Norquist, founder of Americans for Tax Reform.

== Publications ==
- "The Defense Budget. Is It Transformational?". Joint Force Quarterly. Summer 2002. Archived from the original on April 11, 2017 – via Questia.

Political offices
Preceded by Patrick M. Shanahan	United States Deputy Secretary of Defense; Acting; 2019	Succeeded by Richard V. Spencer; Acting
Preceded by Richard V. Spencer; Acting	United States Deputy Secretary of Defense; 2019–2021	Succeeded by Kathleen Hicks
Preceded by Christopher C. Miller; Acting	United States Secretary of Defense; Acting; 2021	Succeeded by Lloyd Austin
