= Tier 1 Group =

American private military company

Tier 1 Group formally known as Aggressive Training Solutions is an American private military company, founded by retired US Marine Steve Reichert in Jacksonville, North Carolina. Tier 1 Group provides marksmanship training, military tactical training, tactical driving/mobility training, breaching training, tactical medical training, and law enforcement training in and outside the US.

== History ==
Tier 1 Group is owned and funded by Cerberus Capital Management which also owns Remington Arms, Bushmaster Firearms International, LLC, Inc., and DPMS Panther Arms among other companies. Tier 1 Group was formed in 2006.

== Shooting range plans ==
After efforts by Tier 1 Group to purchase land in Jones County, North Carolina to be used for a firing range and training facility, Jones County Commissioners passed an ordinance on January 25, 2008 to regulate commercial shooting ranges in the county. On February 1, 2008 Tier 1 Group filed a request to get 2,000 acres (8.1 km^{2}) rezoned in the Bentonville Township in Johnston County, North Carolina. Eventually purchasing land in Arkansas.

== Training of Khashoggi assassins ==
In June 2021, The New York Times reported that four Saudi operatives involved in the October 2018 kidnapping and murder of journalist Jamal Khashoggi had received paramilitary training from Tier 1 Group in 2017. The training, approved by the United States Department of State, included "safe marksmanship" and "countering an attack." Representatives of T1G stated the training was "protective in nature" and that the group was unaware of the Saudis' intentions to murder Khashoggi.
