= Iowa City Police Department =

Municipal police department for the city of Iowa City, Iowa

- Abbreviation: ICPD

Jurisdictional structure
- Operations jurisdiction: Iowa City, Iowa, United States
- Iowa City Police Department jurisdiction
- General nature: Local civilian police

Operational structure
- Headquarters: 410 E. Washington Street; Iowa City, Iowa
- Sworn members: 85 authorized
- Unsworn members: 30
- Agency executive: Dustin Liston, Chief of Police

Website
- Iowa City Police Department

The Iowa City Police Department is the municipal police department for the city of Iowa City, Iowa. The department consists of 82 sworn and 30 non-sworn personnel. The Iowa City Police department's jurisdiction overlaps with the Johnson County Sheriff's Department and the University of Iowa Department of Public Safety Police Division.

== LGBTQ inclusivity ==
The Iowa City Police department has been recognized by the Human Rights Campaign three consecutive years for having a perfect score on the Municipal Equality Index Scorecard. The report from the Human Rights Campaign states [this] "is not a ranking of a city’s atmosphere or quality of life. It is an evaluation of the city’s law and policies, and an examination of how inclusive city services are of LGBTQ people." The Iowa City Police Department employs three full-time officers who serve as liaisons to the LGBTQ community. The officers' department goals include fostering positive relations between the LGBTQ community and the police department, assisting in dialogue with police concerning LGBTQ-related crimes, working in partnership with other agencies on LGBTQ-related issues, and maintaining an interactive role in police training regarding the LGBTQ community.

== Fallen officers ==
In the history of the Iowa City Police Department, one officer has been killed in the line of duty.

Officer	Date of death	Cause of death
Patrolman Edward Leeney	April 29, 1926	Struck by a streetcar

== Substation ==
In addition to the police department headquarters, the Iowa City Police Department also had a substation located at 1067 Highway 6 E, Iowa City, Iowa. The substation housed the Crime Prevention Office, while also providing community meeting space for small group meetings. It was closed in 2019 in response to declining crime rates in the southeast area of Iowa City.
