= Steve Feinberg =

American businessman and government official (born 1960)

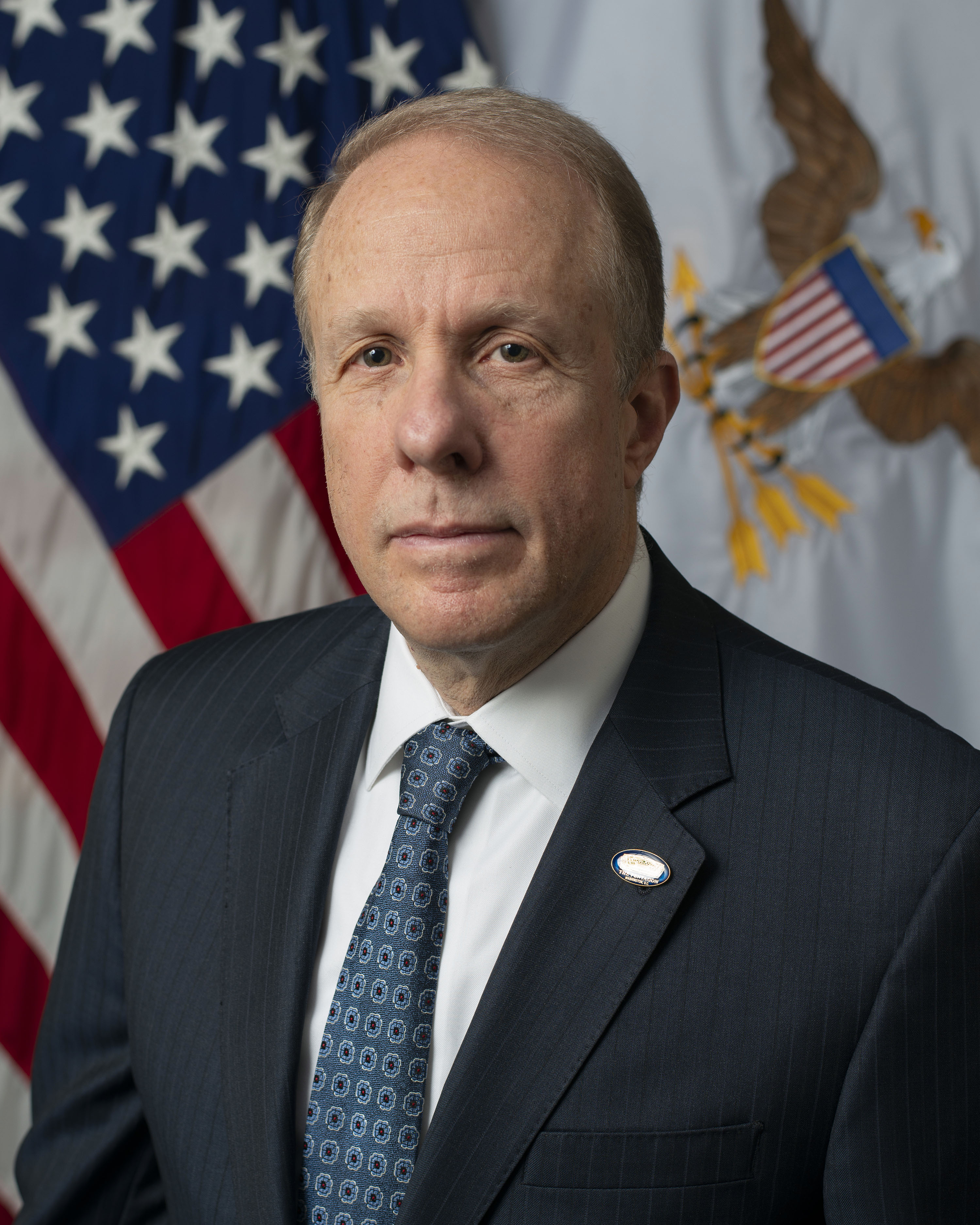
- Official portrait, 2025

36th United States Deputy Secretary of Defense (Note: A secondary title of the position is Deputy Secretary of War after President Donald Trump's 2025 executive order; the formal and legal title can only be changed by an act of Congress.)
- Incumbent
- Assumed office March 17, 2025
- President: Donald Trump
- Secretary: Pete Hegseth
- Preceded by: Kathleen Hicks

Chair of the Intelligence Oversight Board
- In office August 16, 2018 – January 20, 2021
- President: Donald Trump
- Preceded by: Neal S. Wolin
- Succeeded by: James A. Winnefeld Jr.

Chair of the President's Intelligence Advisory Board
- In office May 12, 2018 – January 20, 2021
- President: Donald Trump
- Preceded by: Shirley Ann Jackson; Jami Miscik
- Succeeded by: James A. Winnefeld Jr.

Personal details
- Born: Stephen Andrew Feinberg; March 29, 1960 (age 66) New York City, U.S.
- Party: Republican
- Spouse: Gisella Sanchez
- Children: 3
- Education: Princeton University (BA)

Stephen Andrew Feinberg (born March 29, 1960) is an American billionaire businessman and government official who has served as the 36th United States deputy secretary of defense since 2025. He is the co-founder and former chief executive officer (CEO) of Cerberus Capital Management. Feinberg was also chair of the President's Intelligence Advisory Board from 2018 to 2021, during the first Trump administration.

== Early life and education ==
Feinberg was born to a Jewish family and raised in The Bronx, New York. When aged eight, his family moved to Spring Valley, New York, a suburb of New York City. His father was a steel salesman. He graduated with a Bachelor of Arts in politics from Princeton University in 1982 after completing a 94-page senior thesis titled "The Politics of Prostitution and Drug Legalization." While a student at Princeton, Feinberg captained the tennis team and joined the Reserve Officers' Training Corps.

== Professional career ==
After graduating from college, Feinberg worked as a trader at Drexel Burnham in 1982 and later at Gruntal & Co.

In 1992, at the age of 32, Feinberg co-founded Cerberus Capital Management with William L. Richter and $10 million under management; by 2024; its assets under management would grow past $60 billion. In 1999, the firm hired former vice president Dan Quayle as a chairman of Cerberus Global Investment. In 2006, the firm hired former United States Secretary of the Treasury John Snow, who serves as a chairman of Cerberus.

In May 2011, Feinberg stated that he believed residential mortgage-backed securities may present "a real opportunity for continued investment for quite a period of time" and that there were opportunities in buying assets from European banks.

Feinberg has said of the pay received by himself and other private equity executives, "In general, I think that all of us are way overpaid in this business. It is almost embarrassing." He has also noted in comments made in 2011 that smaller private equity fund sizes may be better for investor returns: "If your goal is to maximize your return as opposed to assets under management, I think you can be most effective with a big company infrastructure and a little bit smaller fund size."

Feinberg has been described as "secretive" in The New York Times. In 2007, Feinberg controversially told Cerberus shareholders, "If anyone at Cerberus has his picture in the paper and a picture of his apartment, we will do more than fire that person. We will kill him. The jail sentence will be worth it."

Cerberus owned DynCorp, a major private security contractor, from 2010 to 2020, leading to accusations of a conflict of interest during Feinberg's service on the President's Intelligence Advisory Board, and again after his nomination as Deputy Secretary of Defense.

In March 2025, he left his position as co-CEO of Cerberus Capital Management when he was sworn in as the 36th United States Deputy Secretary of Defense.

== Early political involvement ==
Feinberg is a major Republican Party donor. In 2016, he served on the Trump Economic Advisory Council during Donald Trump's presidential campaign, donated nearly $1.5 million to pro-Trump PACs, and co-hosted a $50,000-per-person fundraising dinner for Trump and the Republican National Committee.

In February 2017, the New York Times reported that President Trump would give Feinberg a role in the White House review of US intelligence agencies. On May 11, 2018, Trump named Feinberg to head the President's Intelligence Advisory Board.

Feinberg and his wife, Gisela (née Sanchez), contributed $715,600 to Donald Trump's 2020 presidential campaign.

He is a member of The Business Council in Washington, D.C., an association of chief executive officers who meet several times a year for policy discussions.

== United States deputy secretary of defense ==
On December 22, 2024, President-elect Donald Trump announced the nomination of Feinberg to serve as the United States deputy secretary of defense.

Several Democratic senators including Elizabeth Warren expressed concerns over his past experience and possible conflicts of interest between his company Cerberus Capital Management and the United States Department of Defense.

On February 25, 2025, during his confirmation hearing, Feinberg declined to acknowledge that Russia had invaded Ukraine, a common stance among prominent Republicans of the day. He also expressed support for large-scale firings within the Defense Department.

On March 14, 2025, Feinberg was confirmed by the United States Senate with a 59–40 vote. He was sworn in as the 36th United States Deputy Secretary of Defense on March 17, 2025. Feinberg filed paperwork saying he divested from Cerberus, but the paperwork included a clause showing he retains a financial relationship with the firm.

Under Feinberg's leadership, Pentagon officials have been directed to make unprecedented equity investments in private companies, including foreign entities. One key mechanism for doing so is funding through the Department's Office of Strategic Capital, led by Feinberg ally and former Cerberus executive David Lorch. The legality of these mechanisms has been under dispute within the Trump administration and among lawmakers.

Feinberg has also sought to receive proprietary information from contractors and companies as a condition of receiving federal funding, raising concerns about data privacy, cybersecurity, and government overreach. In September 2026, U.S. Secretary of Commerce Howard Lutnick was tapped to review Pentagon deals with Cerberus-linked companies in response to concerns about conflicts of interest from Feinberg and his deputies.

As of August 2026, Feinberg was also tapped to play a key role in restocking dwindling U.S. munition supply.

== Personal life ==
Bloomberg reported his net worth in July 2026 as US$4.5 billion. He splits time between his homes on Manhattan's Upper East Side and Greenwich, Connecticut, with his wife.

== Notes ==
Government offices
| Preceded by Shirley Jackson; Jami Miscik | Chair of the President's Intelligence Advisory Board; 2018–2021 | Succeeded by Sandy Winnefeld |
| Preceded by Neal S. Wolin | Chair of the Intelligence Oversight Board; 2018–2021 | Succeeded by Sandy Winnefeld |
Political offices
| Preceded by Kathleen Hicks | United States Deputy Secretary of Defense; 2025–present | Incumbent |
