= John E. Gordon =

American admiral (1941–2023)

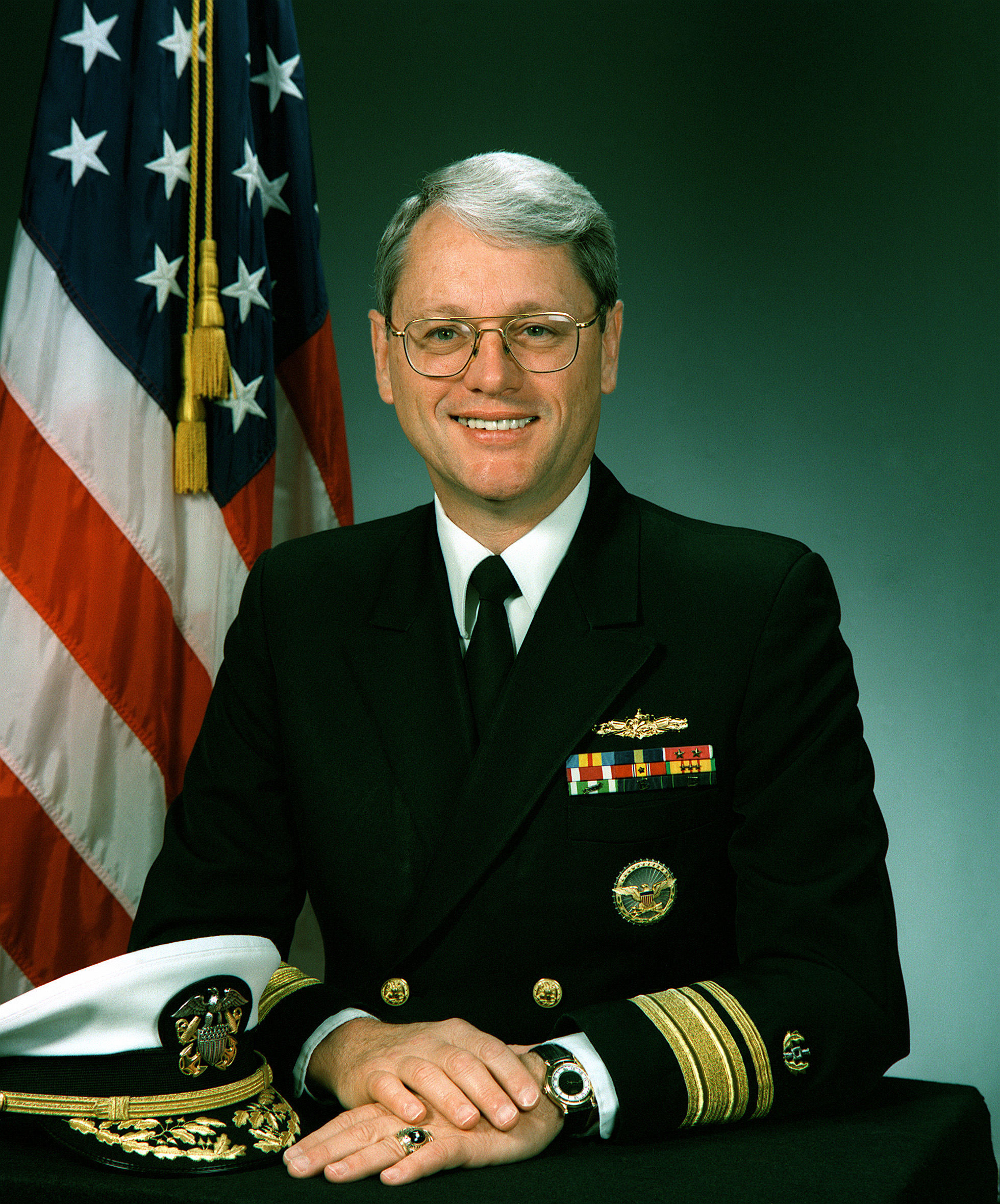
- Rear Admiral Ted Gordon
- Born: April 25, 1941
- Died: January 22, 2023 (aged 81)
- Burial place: Arlington National Cemetery
- Military career
- Allegiance: United States
- Branch: United States Navy
- Service years: 1964–1992
- Rank: Rear Admiral
- Nickname: Ted
- Commands: Judge Advocate General of the Navy; Naval Legal Service Command; Naval Security Investigative Command
- Conflicts: Vietnam War
- Awards: Defense Distinguished Service Medal; Legion of Merit (2); Meritorious Service Medal

John Edward "Ted" Gordon (April 25, 1941 - January 22, 2023) was a retired United States Navy rear admiral who served as Judge Advocate General of the Navy from 1990 until 1992.

== Naval career ==
Raised in Kingston, Pennsylvania, Gordon was educated at the United States Naval Academy and joined the United States Navy upon his graduation in 1964. During the 1960s, he was posted on two different combatant ships, which included service during the Vietnam War. He later served as a contracting officer at the Philadelphia Naval Shipyard.

Gordon attended the Temple University School of Law, receiving his Juris Doctor in 1973. He then joined the Judge Advocate General's Corps, U.S. Navy, in which capacity he held several military justice positions, including deputy officer in charge of the Philadelphia Navy Legal Service Office and as special court martial judge.

Gordon next served as Deputy Navy Chief of Legislative Affairs (Senate). In the 1980s, he served for over four years under United States Secretary of the Navy John Lehman as special assistant for legal and legislative affairs.

In 1986, United States Secretary of Defense Caspar Weinberger named Gordon Deputy Assistant Secretary of Defense for Legislative Affairs, with Gordon being promoted to flag rank. In 1987, he became commander of the Naval Security Investigative Command (NSIC). In this capacity, he oversaw the work of the Naval Investigative Service (NIS), the United States Department of the Navy Security Program, and the Office of Naval Intelligence (ONI). While Commander of NSIC, Gordon was concurrently Director of NIS and Assistant Director of ONI for Counterintelligence. During his time as Commander of NSIC, Gordon was responsible for the navy's response to Operation Ill Wind, and oversaw the prosecution of Clayton J. Lonetree, a member of the Marine Corps Security Guard who allowed a Soviet spy access to the Embassy of the United States in Moscow.

In 1989, Gordon became Deputy Judge Advocate General of the Navy and commander of the Naval Legal Service Command. He became Judge Advocate General of the Navy in 1990.

The Tailhook scandal broke in the wake of the 35th Annual Meeting of the Tailhook Association, held at the Las Vegas Hilton September 8–12, 1991. Over the course of this weekend, more than 100 Navy and United States Marine Corps aviation officers sexually assaulted 87 women and seven men, or otherwise engaged in "improper and indecent" conduct. In response to media reports about this meeting, on October 29, 1991, the Department of the Navy terminated all ties to the Tailhook Association, launching an investigation led by Rear Admiral Gordon and Rear Admiral Duvall Williams, director of the Naval Investigative Service. Williams' initial report blamed the incident primarily on the behavior of low-ranking enlisted men. However, when Williams subsequently made sexist remarks in the presence of Barbara S. Pope, Assistant Secretary of the Navy (Manpower and Reserve Affairs), Pope went to United States Secretary of the Navy Henry L. Garrett III and demanded that he re-open the investigation. As a result, Garrett re-opened the investigation under Derek J. Vander Schaaf, the Inspector General of the United States Department of Defense. In September 1992, Acting Secretary of the Navy Sean O'Keefe revealed the contents of Vander Schaaf's investigation. Vander Schaaf concluded that the initial investigation had been a coverup more concerned with protecting the reputation of the navy than with discovering the role of high-ranking officers in the scandal. Gordon criticized Vander Schaaf's report as "flawed and factually incorrect" and continued to maintain that the initial investigation had been thorough. Gordon retired from the US Navy with full honors.

== Later life ==
After leaving the navy, Gordon took a job at Litton Industries as Vice President for Washington Operations, overseeing the company's interactions with all branches of government. He left Litton in 2001, joining Alliant Techsystems as Vice President (Washington Operations). He retired from Alliant in 2007.

From 2007, he was a senior fellow at the Potomac Institute for Policy Studies, where he sat on the board of regents

Gordon died on 22 January 2023 in Trappe, Maryland, and was buried at Arlington National Cemetery.
