= James D. Hittle =

American Marine Corps Brigadier General and Government official

James Donald Hittle
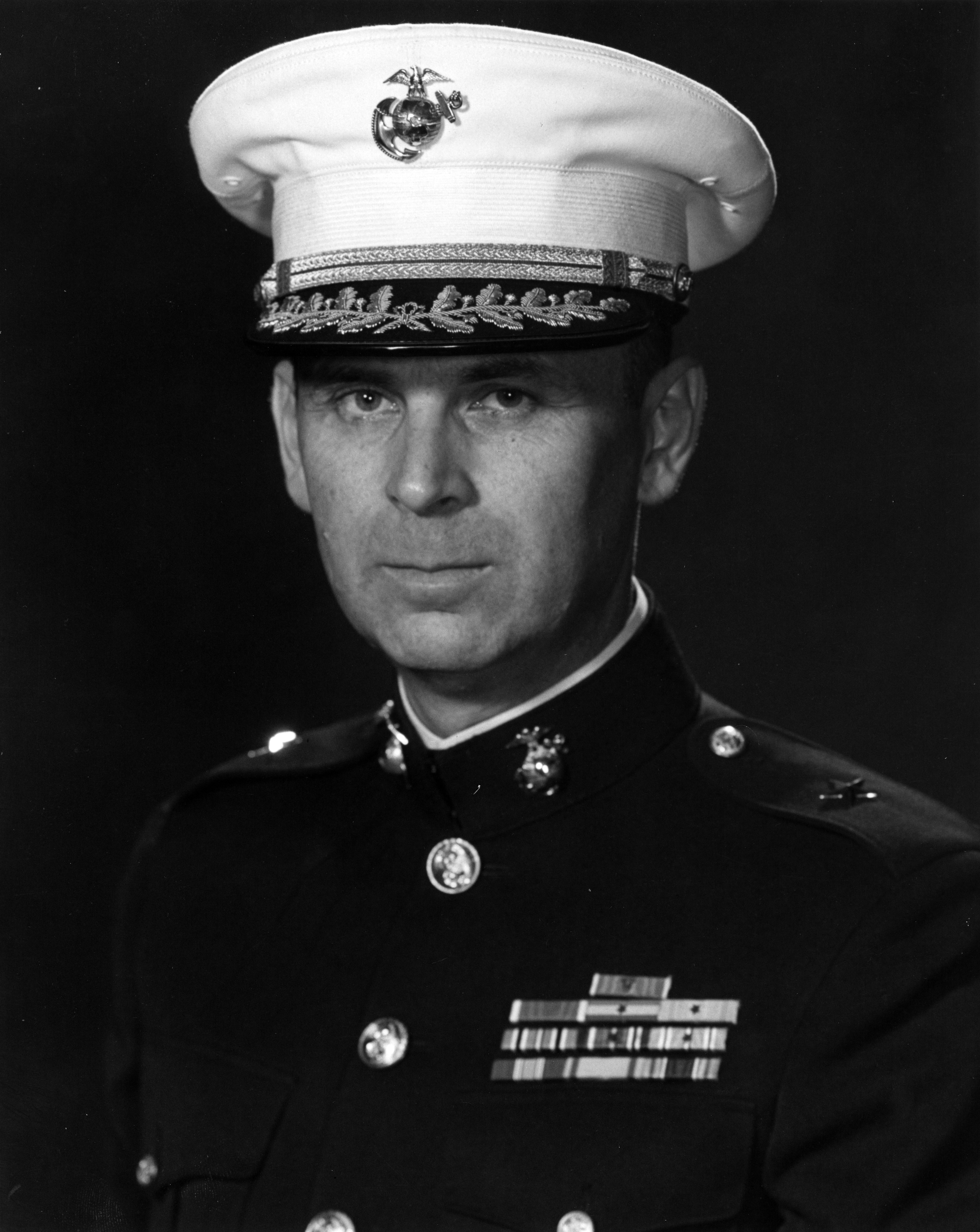
- BG James D. Hittle, USMC
- Born: June 10, 1915; Bear Lake, Michigan
- Died: June 15, 2002 (aged 87); Arlington, Virginia
- Burial place: Arlington National Cemetery
- Military career
- Allegiance: United States of America
- Branch: United States Marine Corps
- Service years: 1937–1960
- Rank: Brigadier general
- Nickname: "Don"
- Service number: 0-5627
- Commands: Legislative assistant to CMC; G-4, 3rd Marine Division; 2d Battalion, 7th Marines
- Conflicts: World War II: Arctic convoys; Battle of Iwo Jima; Chinese Civil War
- Awards: Legion of Merit; Purple Heart
- Other work: Government official

James Donald Hittle (June 10, 1915 – June 15, 2002) was a decorated officer in the United States Marine Corps with the rank of brigadier general. He is most noted for his service as legislative assistant to the commandant of the Marine Corps, between June 1952 and January 1960. Following his retirement from the Marine Corps, Hittle served as United States Assistant Secretary of the Navy (Manpower and Reserve Affairs) from March 1969 until March 1971.

Hittle was also a member of so-called "Chowder Society", a special Marine Corps Board, which was tasked to conduct research and prepare material relative to postwar legislation concerning the role of the Marine Corps in national defense.

== Early career and World War II ==
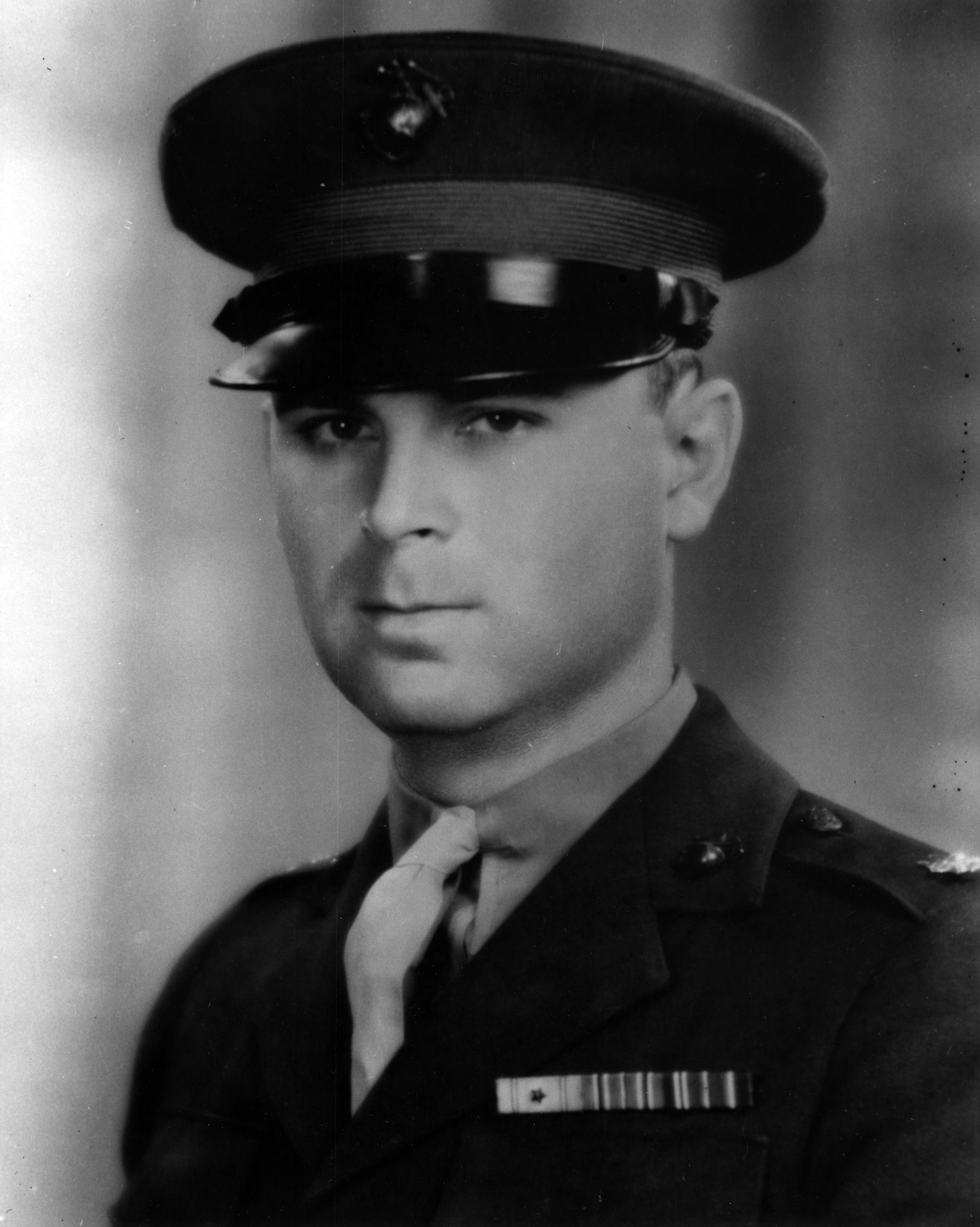
Hittle as major in June 1943

James D. Hittle was born on June 10, 1915, in Bear Lake, Michigan, as the son of Harry F. and Margaret Jane Hittle. He attended the public schools in Lansing and East Lansing and subsequently graduated from Michigan State College in the summer of 1937, having completed a pre-law course, with Bachelor of Arts degree in history and political science. During his time at the college, Hittle completed ROTC advanced course and was commissioned reserve second lieutenant in the U.S. Army Cavalry on June 14, 1937.

However, he resigned his reserve commission in order to accept appointment as second lieutenant in the Marine corps on July 19, 1937. Hittle was then ordered to the Basic School at Philadelphia Navy Yard for basic officer training, which he completed one year later. He was then attached to the Marine detachment aboard the cruiser USS Portland and took part in the patrol cruises in the Pacific Ocean.

He then joined 5th Marine Regiment, 1st Marine Brigade under Brigadier General Holland Smith and was promoted to first lieutenant in summer 1940. Hittle remained with the unit following its expansion to 1st Marine Division and participated in the amphibious exercise at Culebra, Puerto Rico. He assumed command of the Marine detachment aboard the battleship USS Washington in May 1941 and participated in the Arctic convoys in the Norwegian Sea in April 1942. During his service aboard that ship, he was promoted to captain in February 1942.

Hittle was promoted to the rank of major in August 1942 and ordered to the Division Officer's course at Army Infantry School at Fort Benning, Georgia. He completed the course in October of that year and assumed duty as an instructor on the staff of Marine Corps Schools, Quantico. While in this capacity, Hittle held additional duty as lecturer at Army and Navy Staff College in Washington, D.C., and received promotion to the rank of lieutenant colonel in May 1944. During his time in Washington, Hittle wrote The Military Staff, Its History and Development, a work which presents an American-spin on the history and evolution of what is commonly called "the General Staff" in Prussia/Germany, France, Great Britain, the United States, and Russia up to the end of the 1940s.

He was ordered to the Pacific area in November 1944 and joined 3rd Marine Division under Major General Graves B. Erskine. Hittle relieved Colonel William C. Hall as divisional logistics officer and spent three months of training at Guam. He sailed with the division to Iwo Jima in February 1945 and participated in the main landing. Hittle was responsible for the organization of supply routes, and units under his command brought approximately 20,000 tons of material, ammunitions and other provisions ashore.

Although he was slightly wounded, he remained in the combat area and kept organizing the arrival of supplies. Hittle was decorated with the Legion of Merit with Combat "V" for his service on Iwo Jima and also received the Purple Heart for wounds.

== Postwar period ==
Following the war, Hittle remained with the staff of 3rd Marine Division at Guam and was transferred to the 7th Marine Regiment and assumed command of 2nd Battalion on February 25, 1946. The regiment was stationed within 1st Marine Division in Qingdao, China by that time and participated in the combats with communists guerillas. He remained in Northern China until June 25, 1946, and subsequently was ordered back to the United States.

=== Chowder Society ===
A milestone in his career was his assignment to the staff of Marine Corps Schools, Quantico under Brigadier General Oliver P. Smith. Hittle was appointed secretary of the academic board just during the uneasy time for the Marine Corps. President Harry S. Truman intended the reorganize the United States Armed Forces and due to cuts in Marine Corps budget, the threat of merging in the United States Army was more realistic. Hittle became a member of the so-called "Chowder Society", special Marine Corps Board under General Gerald C. Thomas, which was tasked by Commandant Alexander Vandegrift to conduct research and prepare material relative to postwar legislation concerning the role of the Marine Corps in national defense.

While in this assignment, Hittle had the opportunity to cooperate with great names of modern Marine history such as: Merrill B. Twining, Victor H. Krulak, Merritt A. Edson, Robert E. Hogaboom, James E. Kerr, James C. Murray, Jonas M. Platt, DeWolf Schatzel, Samuel R. Shaw, Robert D. Heinl, Edward H. Hurst or Marine Corps Reserve officers John R. Blandford, Arthur B. Hanson, Lyford Hutchins, and William McCahill.

Within this capacity, Hittle was well acquainted with chairman of Committee on Expenditures in the Executive Departments, Clare Hoffman, and, as a result, was able to work closely with him until enactment of legislation. As the legislation progressed, Hittle's tasks became more detailed, requiring daily trips to Washington. His work eventually achieved official status when the commandant Vandegrift formally approved his duties with Hoffman as special advisor on the National Security Act of 1947. Hittle's influence with committee members is credited with helping guarantee the independence of Marine Corps aviation in the face of air force pressure to be the sole air arm among other successes for the navy and Marine Corps.

=== 1949-1960 ===
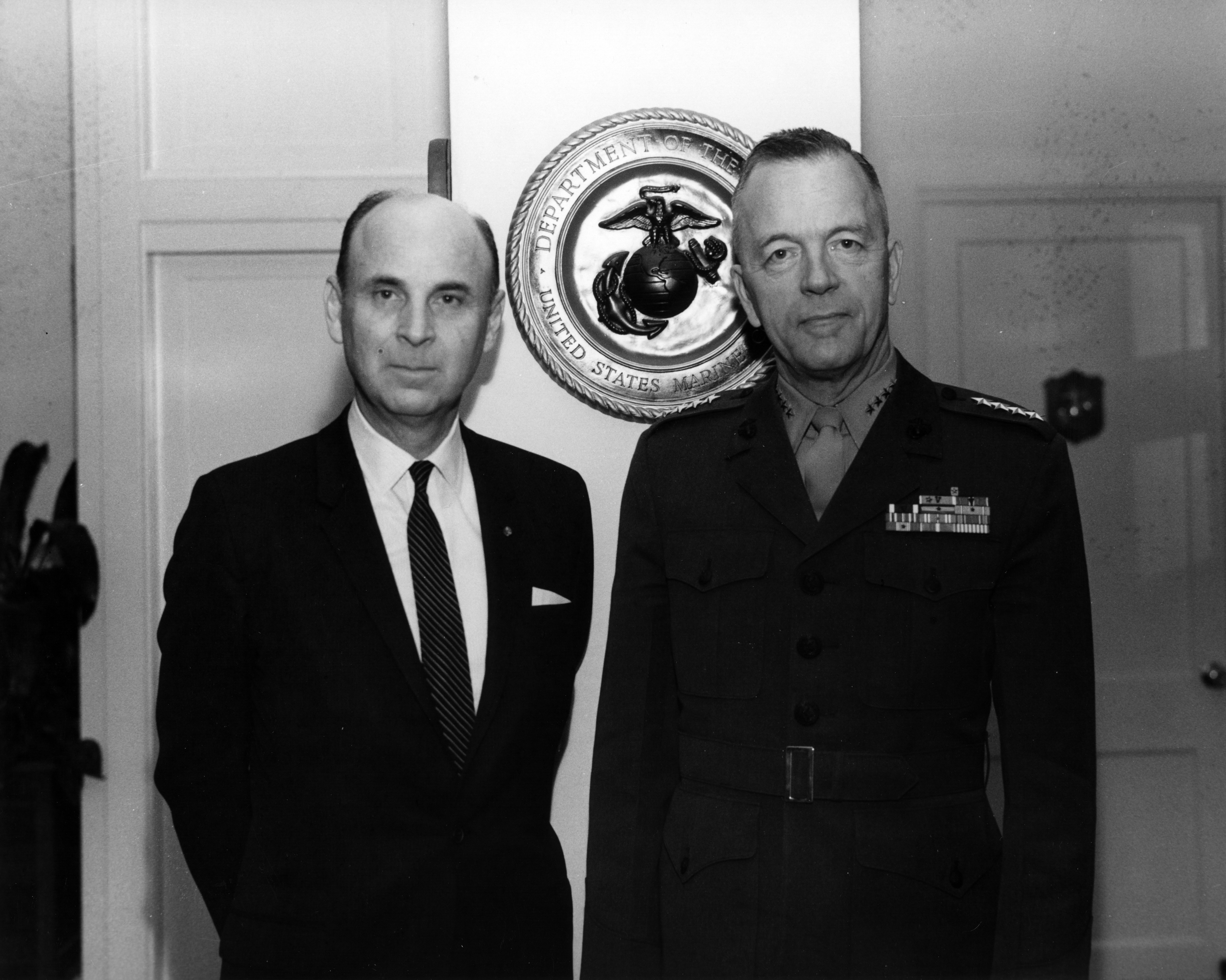
Assistant Secretary of the Navy Hittle visited the commandant of the Marine Corps, Leonard F. Chapman Jr. in his office in Washington, D.C.

Hittle was transferred to Salt Lake City in June 1949 and appointed executive officer of the Naval Reserve Officers Training Corps unit at the University of Utah. While in this capacity, he was promoted to the rank of colonel in November 1951 and also earned master's degree in Oriental History and Geography at the end of his tenure with Naval ROTC unit.

He was transferred to the Headquarters Marine Corps in June 1952 and appointed legislative assistant to the commandant of the Marine Corps. Hittle served in this capacity consecutively under Commandants Lemuel C. Shepherd Jr., Randolph M. Pate and David M. Shoup.

Hittle officially retired from the active service on March 1, 1958, and was advanced to the rank of brigadier general on the retired list for having been specially commended in combat. However, he was immediately recalled to active service and served in the capacity of legislative assistant to the commandant until January 1960. Hittle was awarded the Alfred Thayer Mahan Award for Literary Achievement during the same year.

== Later career ==
Shortly after his retirement from the Marine Corps, Hittle was offered the position of Assistant Secretary of Defense for Legislative Affairs, which he held until November 1960. He then served as director of national security and foreign affairs, Veterans of Foreign Wars, until 1967, when he returned to the Pentagon as special counsel within the Senate Armed Services Committee. During this period, he also served as military commentator for MBS TV and syndicated columnist for Copley News Service. While served in the capacity as Director of national security of Veterans of Foreign Wars, Hittle received Ordre du Mérite combattant by the Government of France as a token of good will.

In March 1969, Hittle was appointed Assistant Secretary of the Navy for Manpower and Reserve Affairs and was responsible for recruiting all of the personnel of the United States Navy and the United States Marine Corps, including military personnel (both active and reserve), government civilians, contractors, and volunteers until March 1971.

He then assumed duty as senior vice president for government affairs with Pan American World Airways and remained in that capacity until 1973, when he worked as consultant to the Administrator of Veterans Affairs until 1977. Hittle subsequently served as consultant to the commandant of the Marine Corps, Robert H. Barrow, until 1981 and then assumed duty as counselor to the Secretary of the Navy, John Lehman.

Hittle served in that capacity until Lehman's resignation in April 1987. He then settled in Arlington, Virginia, and served as the president of the Army and Navy Club in Washington, D.C. While in the club, he was a member of a luncheon group where he met with the former members of the "Chowder Society".

In 1994, Hittle was given College of Arts & Letters Distinguished Alumni Award by the Michigan State University "for having differentiated himself by achieving the highest level of professional and personal accomplishments. Those recipients possess the utmost integrity and character to positively reflect and enhance the prestige of Michigan State University. Those recipients are engaged in improving the community, the state, the nation, and/or the world and personally engaged in helping others through various efforts."

Brigadier General James D. Hittle died on June 15, 2002, in his home at Arlington, Virginia, and is buried together with his wife, Edna Jane Hittle (1917–1969) at Arlington National Cemetery, Virginia. They had together two sons, Harry M. Hittle and James Hittle, Jr.

== Decorations ==
This is the ribbon bar of Brigadier General James D. Hittle:

1st Row	Legion of Merit with Combat "V"		Purple Heart
2nd Row	Navy Presidential Unit Citation with one star	American Defense Service Medal with Base Clasp	American Campaign Medal
3rd Row	European–African–Middle Eastern Campaign Medal with one 3/16 inch service star	Asiatic-Pacific Campaign Medal with one 3/16" service star	China Service Medal
4th Row	World War II Victory Medal	National Defense Service Medal	Ordre du Mérite combattant (France)

Government offices
Preceded by Randolph S. Driver	Assistant Secretary of the Navy (Manpower and Reserve Affairs); March 1969 – March 1971	Succeeded by James E. Johnson
Preceded by George W. Vaughan	Assistant Secretary of Defense for Legislative Affairs; March 1960 – November 1960	Succeeded by Norman S. Paul
