= Barbara S. Pope =

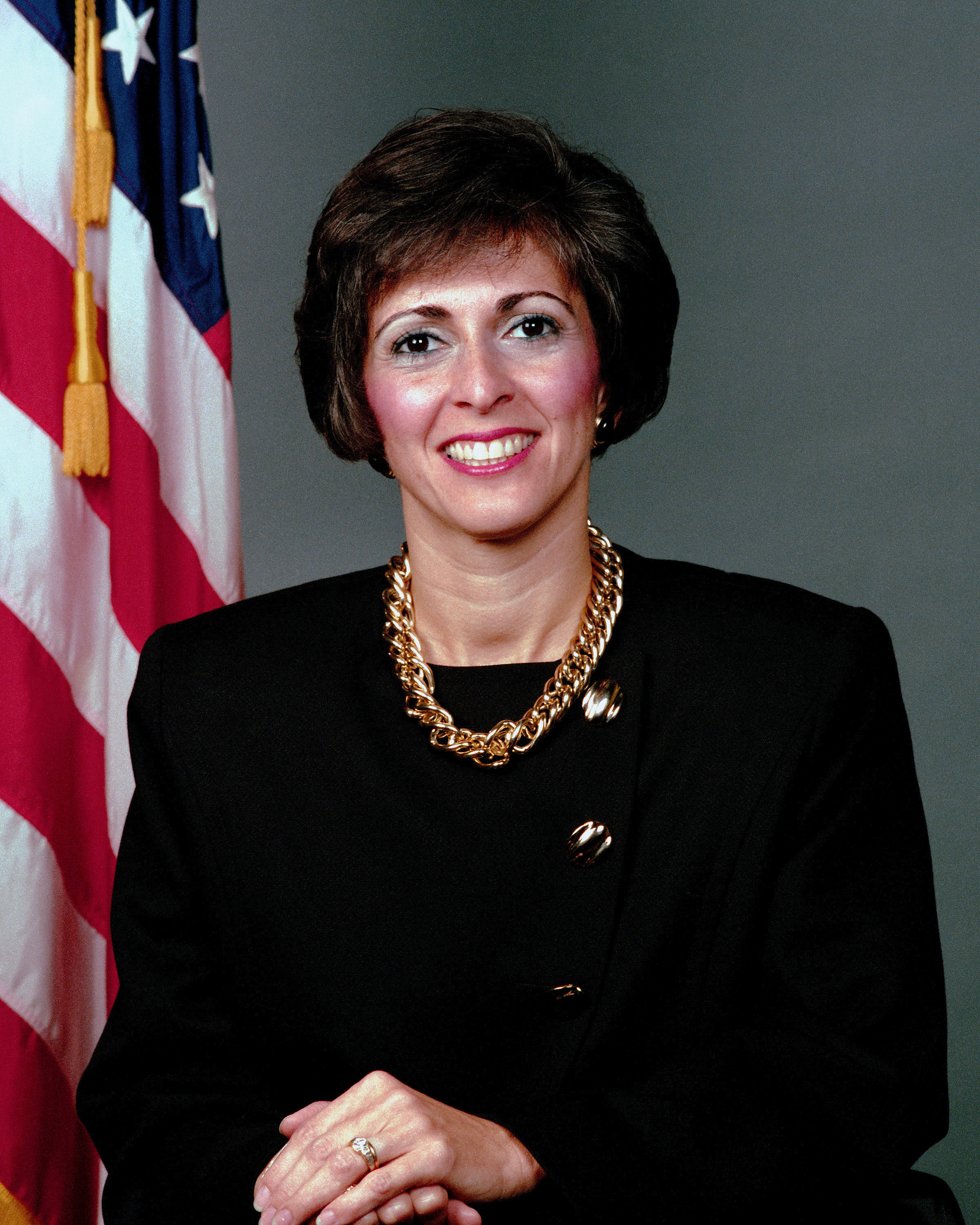

11th Assistant Secretary of the Navy (Manpower and Reserve Affairs)
- In office November 1989 – January 20, 1993
- President: George H. W. Bush
- Preceded by: Kenneth P. Bergquist
- Succeeded by: Dorothy M. Meletzke (acting); Frederick Pang

Personal details
- Born: Barbara Lee Spyridon; November 10, 1951 (age 74) Pittsburgh, Pennsylvania, U.S.
- Spouse: James Selkirk Pope
- Children: 2
- Education: Wesleyan College; Vanderbilt University (BA); George Washington University

Barbara Spyridon Pope (born November 10, 1951) was United States Assistant Secretary of the Navy (Manpower and Reserve Affairs) from 1989 to 1993. She came to prominence during the Tailhook scandal for her opposition to the initial investigation conducted by Rear Admiral Duvall M. Williams, Jr., which she felt was a whitewash.

== Biography ==
Barbara Lee Spyridon was born in Pittsburgh on November 10, 1951. She attended Wesleyan College 1969-71 and Vanderbilt University 1971–73, graduating with a B.A. in psychology in May 1973. She attended George Washington University 1978–80, and worked as an administrative assistant in the Small Business Administration's Office of General Counsel 1979–80. She was an employee development specialist in the Small Business Administration's Office of Personnel 1980–82, and then served as Special Assistant to the Administrator of the Small Business Administration 1982–86.

In 1986, Pope became Deputy Assistant Secretary of Defense (Family Support, Education, and Safety) in the United States Department of Defense.

On August 19, 1989, President of the United States George H. W. Bush nominated Pope as Assistant Secretary of the Navy (Manpower and Reserve Affairs), and, after ratification by the United States Senate, Pope served as Assistant Secretary of the Navy (Manpower and Reserve Affairs) from November 1989 until January 1993.

When the Tailhook scandal broke in 1991, Pope became concerned that the United States Department of the Navy was not conducting a proper investigation into allegations that United States Navy personnel had sexually harassed women at the 1991 meeting of the Tailhook Association in Las Vegas. She was particularly concerned because the officer heading the investigation, Rear Admiral Duvall M. Williams, Jr., head of the Naval Investigative Service, made sexist remarks in Pope's presence, most notably a comment that he believed that "a lot of female Navy pilots are go-go dancers, topless dancers or hookers". When Admiral Williams issued his final report, finding that no senior Navy officials bore responsibility for what occurred in Las Vegas, Pope went to United States Secretary of the Navy Henry L. Garrett III and told him that she would resign if the United States Department of the Navy did not "do another report and look at what we needed to do about accountability and responsibility and the larger issues at hand." Garrett agreed with Pope, and a further investigation was conducted, headed by Derek J. Vander Schaaf, the Inspector General of the United States Department of Defense, that ultimately resulted in the resignation of Admiral Williams, and a second admiral, Rear Adm. John E. Gordon, for their failure to conduct a thorough investigation into the Tailhook allegations. In the wake of Vander Schaaf's report, the Naval Investigative Service was reorganized as the Naval Criminal Investigative Service.

In the wake of the Tailhook scandal, Pope chaired an ad hoc committee to study the role of women in the military. In the course of this study, she said that "As we looked at assimilation and integration of women, combat exclusions and how we do business, it was clear women had been made to feel like second-class citizens." This committee played a role in United States Secretary of Defense Les Aspin's 1993 order ending the ban against female combat pilots and his decision to ask the United States Congress to allow women to serve on American navy ships.

Pope later became Assistant Secretary of State for Civil Rights under United States Secretary of State Colin Powell. Powell tasked Pope with moving to combat discrimination in the United States Armed Forces.

Her husband is James Selkirk "Jay" Pope, and together, they have two children, Jim and Kacey. Kacey is Autistic. Upon leaving government service, Pope joined Sunrise Senior Living as Director of Special Needs Assisted Living and in this capacity oversees Sunrise Senior Living's expansion into creating facilities for assisted living for special needs individuals over the age of 21.

== Cultural references ==
In the 1995 television movie She Stood Alone: The Tailhook Scandal, Pope was played by actress Bess Armstrong.

Government offices
Preceded by Kenneth P. Bergquist	Assistant Secretary of the Navy (Manpower and Reserve Affairs); November 1989 – January 1993	Succeeded by Dorothy M. Meletzke (acting); Frederick Pang
