= Hal M. Hornburg =

United States Air Force general

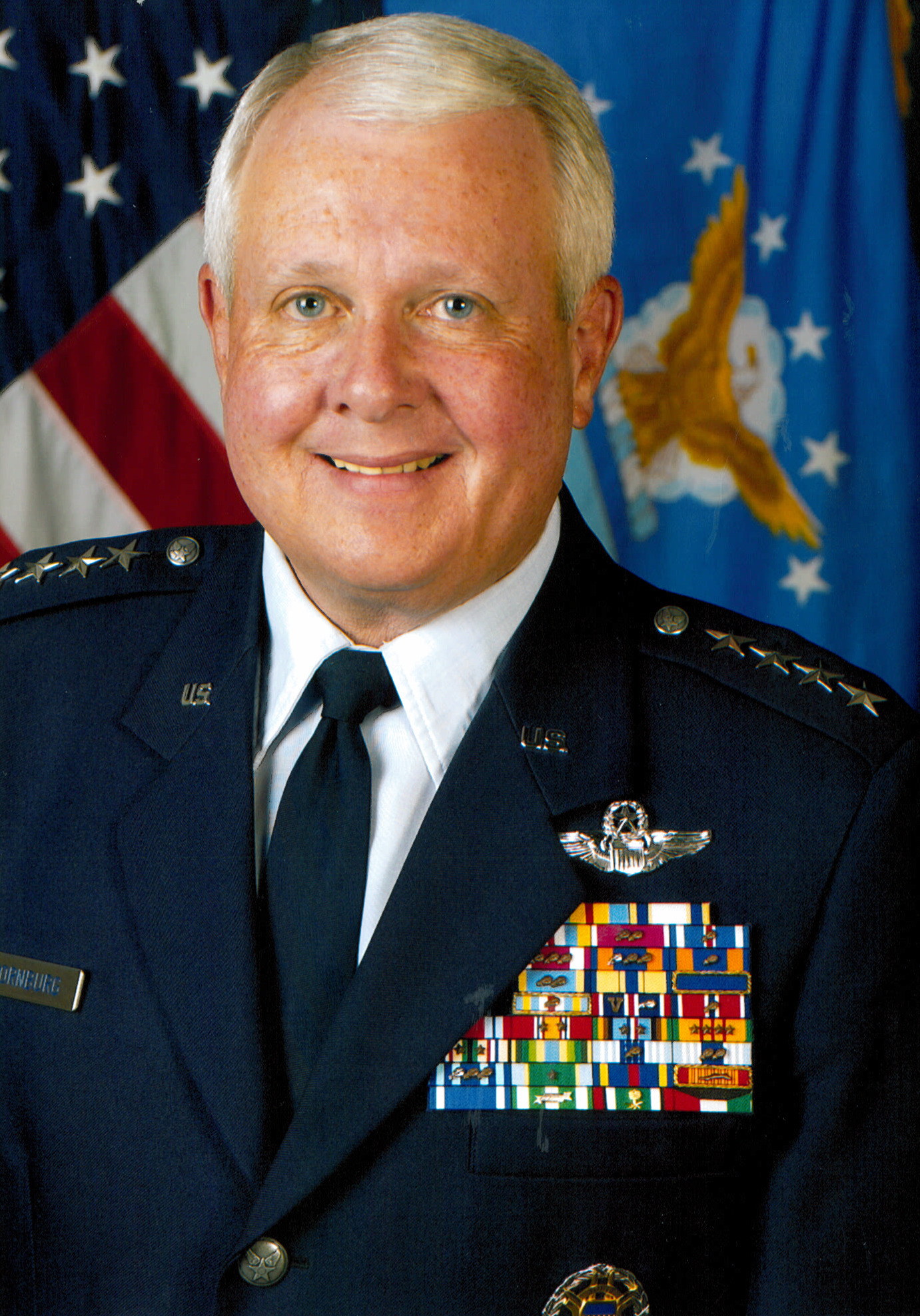
- General Hal M. Hornburg
- Born: December 7, 1945 (age 80); Corsicana, Texas
- Military career
- Allegiance: United States of America
- Branch: United States Air Force
- Service years: 1968–2005
- Rank: General
- Commands: Air Combat Command; Air Education and Training Command; 9th Air Force; Joint Warfighting Center
- Conflicts: Vietnam War; Gulf War
- Awards: Legion of Merit (3); Distinguished Flying Cross (2); Air Medal (10)
- Other work: Board of Advisors, Karta Technologies, Inc. Strategic Message Solutions

Hal M. Hornburg (born December 7, 1945) is a retired United States Air Force (USAF) four-star general. He last served as commander, Air Combat Command, with headquarters at Langley Air Force Base, Virginia, and Air Component Commander for U.S. Joint Forces Command and U.S. Northern Command.

General Hornburg entered the USAF in 1968 as a graduate of Texas A&M University's ROTC program. He has commanded at all levels—flight, squadron, wing, numbered air force and major command. He also commanded a composite fighter wing during Operation Desert Storm and the first USAF composite wing during the services reorganization in 1991–1992. General Hornburg directed air operations over Bosnia, commanded the Joint Warfighting Center, served on the Joint Staff, and directed operations at Headquarters U.S. Air Force. He also has served as Tactical Air Command's (TAC) F-15 demonstration pilot for the East Coast, as Air Force Liaison Officer to the U.S. Senate, and as Chief of the Air Force Colonels' Group. Prior to assuming command of Air Combat Command, Hornburg commanded Air Education and Training Command. The general is a command pilot with more than 4,400 flight hours. He retired from the USAF on January 1, 2005.

== Education ==
- 1968 Bachelor of Business Administration degree in finance, Texas A&M University
- 1974 Squadron Officer School, Maxwell AFB, Alabama
- 1978 Air Command and Staff College
- 1978 Master of Science degree in human resource management, University of Utah
- 1986 National War College, Fort Lesley J. McNair, Washington, D.C.
- 1987 Seminar XXI, Foreign Political and International Relations, Massachusetts Institute of Technology
- 1994 National and International Security Program, Harvard University, Cambridge, Massachusetts

== Assignments ==
- July 1968 – June 1969, student, undergraduate pilot training, Reese AFB, Texas
- July 1969 – October 1969, student, O-1 forward air controller combat crew training, Hurlburt Field, Florida
- October 1969 – September 1970, forward air controller, 21st Tactical Air Support Squadron, Cam Ranh Bay Air Base, Qui Nhon, Pleiku and Gia Nghia, South Vietnam
- October 1970 – October 1972, T-38 Talon instructor pilot, check pilot and flight examiner, 3500th Pilot Training Squadron, Reese AFB, Texas
- October 1972 – January 1975, T-38 instructor pilot, check pilot and flight examiner, 64th Flying Training Wing, Reese AFB, Texas
- January 1975 – September 1975, student, F-4 combat crew training, 31st Tactical Fighter Wing, Homestead AFB, Florida
- September 1975 – January 1977, F-4D fighter pilot, 492nd Tactical Fighter Squadron, Royal Air Force Lakenheath, England
- January 1977 – July 1977, F-4E fighter pilot, 512th Tactical Fighter Squadron, Ramstein Air Base, West Germany
- July 1977 – September 1978, aide-de-camp to the Commander in Chief, Headquarters U.S. Air Forces in Europe, Ramstein AB, West Germany
- October 1978 – November 1978, student, F-15 combat crew training, 555th Tactical Fighter Squadron, Luke AFB, Arizona
- December 1978 – July 1982, F-15 fighter pilot and Chief, Standardization and Evaluation Division, 1st Tactical Fighter Wing, Langley AFB, Virginia
- July 1982 – July 1984, assistant, Senior Officer Management Division, Headquarters TAC, Langley AFB, Virginia
- July 1984 – March 1985, Commander, 27th Tactical Fighter Squadron, Langley AFB, Virginia
- March 1985 – July 1985, Assistant Deputy Commander for Operations, 1st Tactical Fighter Wing, Langley AFB, Virginia
- August 1985 – June 1986, student, National War College, Fort Lesley J. McNair, Washington, D.C.
- July 1986 – January 1987, Chief, Western Hemisphere Division, Deputy Chief of Staff for Plans and Operations, Headquarters U.S. Air Force, Washington, D.C.
- January 1987 – July 1987, Chief, Senate Liaison Division, Air Force Secretariat, Headquarters U.S. Air Force, Washington, D.C.
- July 1987 – March 1989, Chief, Air Force Colonels' Group, Headquarters Air Force Military Personnel Center, Randolph AFB, Texas
- March 1989 – April 1990, Vice Commander, 1st Tactical Fighter Wing, Langley AFB, Virginia
- April 1990 – August 1992, Commander, 4th Wing, Seymour Johnson AFB, North Carolina (August 1990 – March 1991, Commander, 4th Fighter Wing (Provisional), operations Desert Shield and Desert Storm, Southwest Asia)
- August 1992 – July 1993, Director of Operations, Deputy Chief of Staff for Plans and Operations, Headquarters U.S. Air Force, Washington, D.C.
- July 1993 – November 1994, Vice Director, Operational Plans and Interoperability Directorate (J-7), the Joint Staff, Washington, D.C.
- November 1994 – September 1996, Deputy Commander, Headquarters 16th Air Force, and Director, Combined Air Operations Center, 5th Allied Tactical Air Force, Vicenza, Italy
- September 1996 – May 1998, Commander, Joint Warfighting Center, Fort Monroe, Virginia
- May 1998 – January 2000, Commander, 9th Air Force and U.S. Central Command Air Forces, Shaw AFB, South Carolina
- January 2000 – June 2000, Vice Commander, Air Combat Command, Langley AFB, Virginia
- June 2000 – November 2001, Commander, Air Education and Training Command, Randolph AFB, Texas
- November 2001 – 2004, Commander, Air Combat Command, Langley AFB, Virginia; Air Component Commander for U.S. Joint Forces Command; and effective October 1, 2002, Air Component Commander for U.S. Northern Command

== Flight information ==
- Rating: Command pilot
- Flight hours: 4,400
- Aircraft flown: T-37, T-38, O-1, O-2, OV-10, F-100, F-4D/E, F-15A/C/E, F-16C, KC-10, T-6 Texan II and C-21

== Later careers ==
Hornburg currently serves on the Segs4Vets Advisory Board.

== Awards and decorations ==
US Air Force Command Pilot Badge
Joint Chiefs of Staff Badge

Defense Distinguished Service Medal
Air Force Distinguished Service Medal
Defense Superior Service Medal
Legion of Merit with two bronze oak leaf clusters
Distinguished Flying Cross with oak leaf cluster
Meritorious Service Medal with three oak leaf clusters
Air Medal with silver and three bronze oak leaf clusters
Air Medal (second ribbon to denote tenth award)
Aerial Achievement Medal with two oak leaf clusters
Air Force Commendation Medal
Air Force Presidential Unit Citation
Joint Meritorious Unit Award with oak leaf cluster
Air Force Outstanding Unit Award with Valor device and silver oak leaf cluster
Air Force Organizational Excellence Award with oak leaf cluster
Combat Readiness Medal
National Defense Service Medal with two bronze service stars
Armed Forces Expeditionary Medal with two service stars
Vietnam Service Medal with four service stars
Southwest Asia Service Medal with two service stars
Armed Forces Service Medal
Air Force Overseas Short Tour Service Ribbon with oak leaf cluster
Air Force Overseas Long Tour Service Ribbon with two oak leaf clusters
Air Force Longevity Service Award with silver and three bronze oak leaf clusters
Small Arms Expert Marksmanship Ribbon with service star
Air Force Training Ribbon
Vietnam Gallantry Cross Unit Citation
NATO Medal for Former Yugoslavia
Vietnam Campaign Medal
Kuwait Liberation Medal (Saudi Arabia)
Kuwait Liberation Medal (Kuwait)

== Effective dates of promotion ==
Promotions
Insignia	Rank	Date
	General	August 1, 2000
	Lieutenant General	July 1, 1998
	Major General	September 20, 1994
	Brigadier General	August 1, 1992
	Colonel	December 1, 1985
	Lieutenant Colonel	December 1, 1982
	Major	September 1, 1979
	Captain	July 1, 1971
	First Lieutenant	January 1, 1970
	Second Lieutenant	May 24, 1968
