= USS Harvey C. Barnum Jr. =

US Navy destroyer

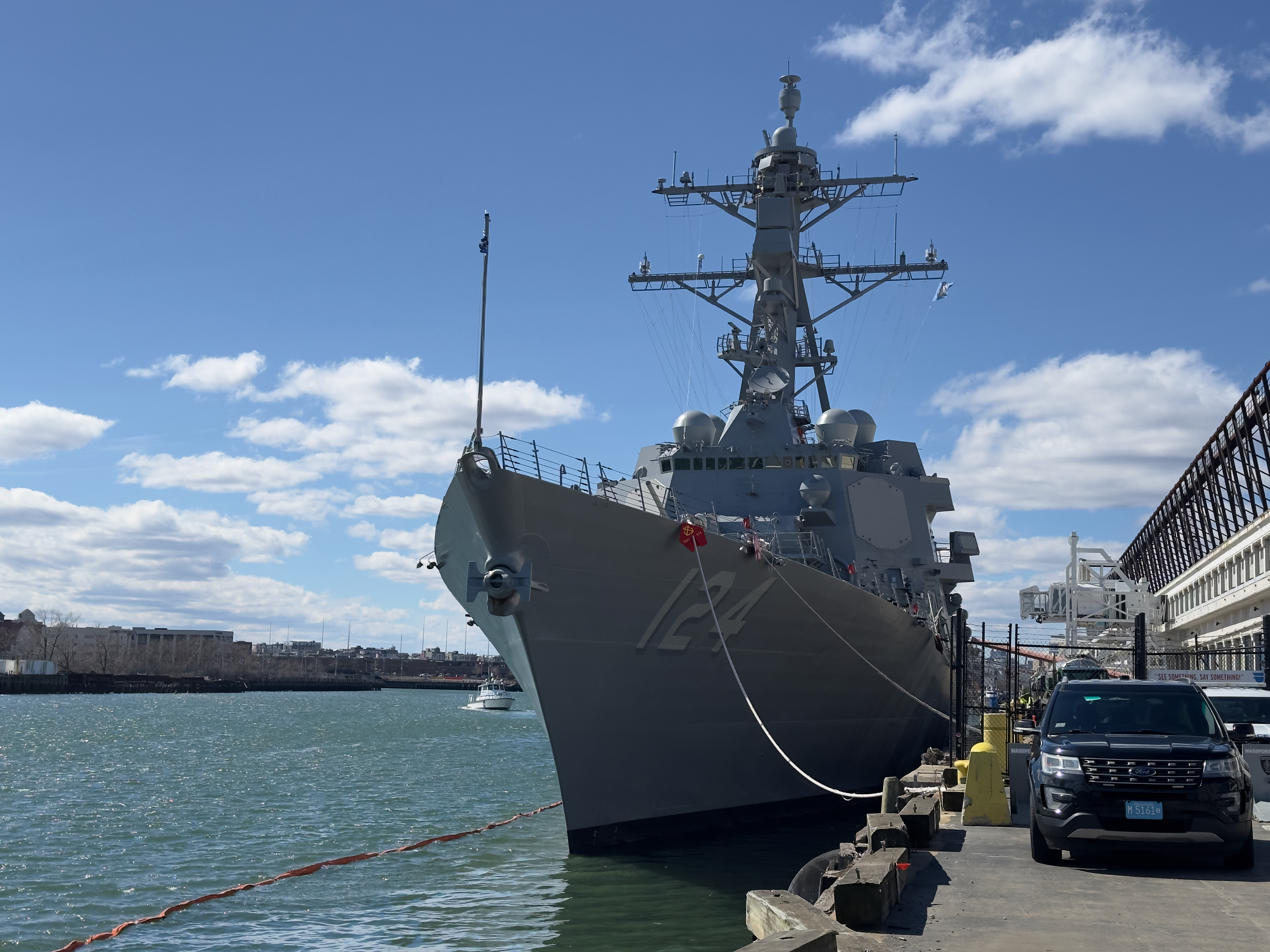
- USS Harvey C. Barnum Jr. In Boston March 2026

History

United States
- Name: Harvey C. Barnum Jr.
- Namesake: Harvey C. Barnum Jr.
- Awarded: 3 June 2013
- Builder: Bath Iron Works
- Laid down: 6 April 2021
- Launched: 27 September 2023
- Sponsored by: Martha Hill
- Commissioned: 11 April 2026
- Home port: NS Norfolk, VA
- Identification: Hull number: DDG-124
- Motto: En agite, "Charge on!"
- Status: In active service
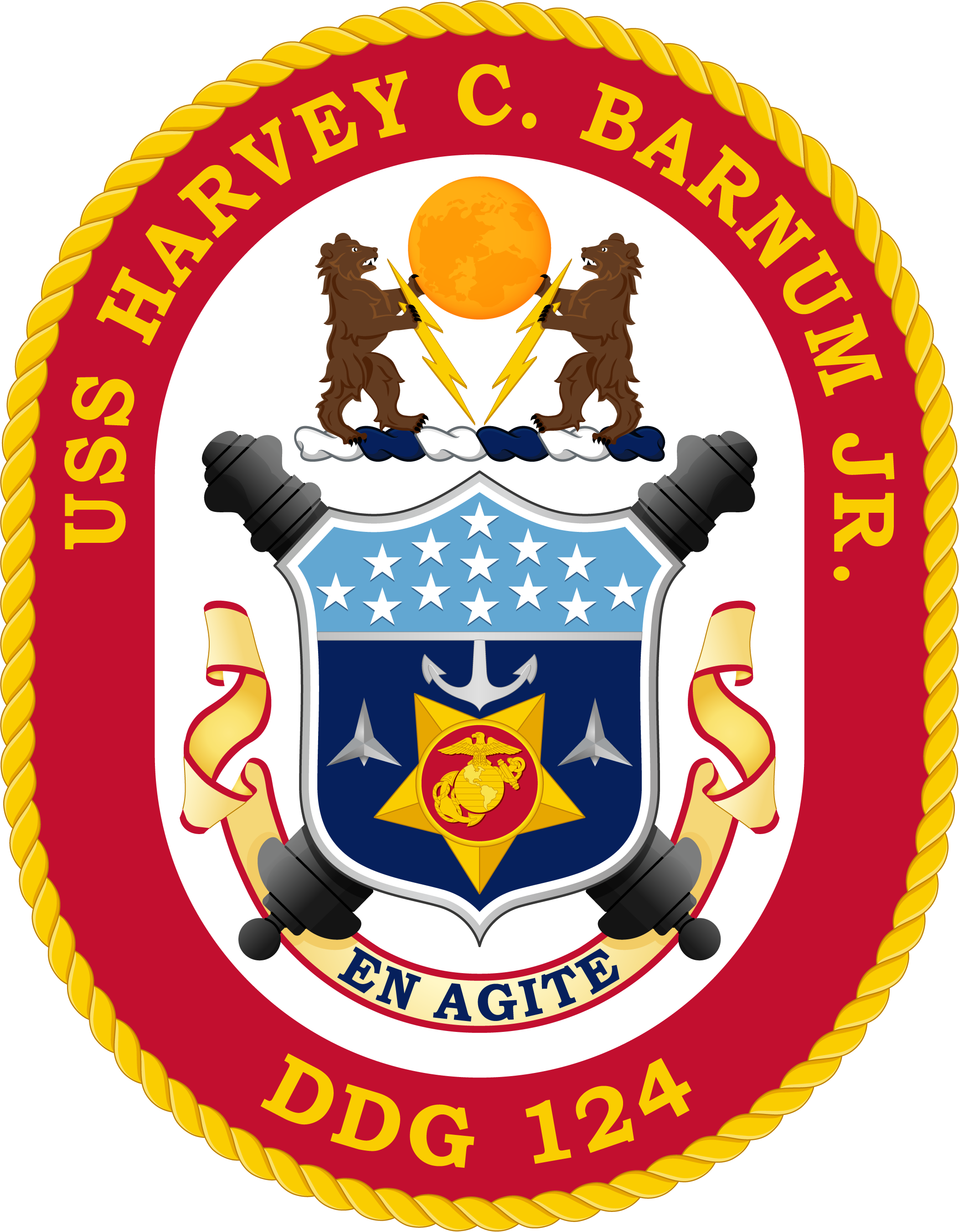
- Badge

General characteristics
- Class & type: Arleigh Burke-class destroyer
- Displacement: 9,217 tons (full load)
- Length: 513 ft (156 m)
- Beam: 66 ft (20 m)
- Propulsion: 4 × General Electric LM2500 gas turbines 100,000 shp (75,000 kW)
- Speed: 31 knots (57 km/h; 36 mph)
- Complement: 380 officers and enlisted
- Armament: Guns: 1 × 5-inch (127 mm)/62 Mk 45 Mod 4 (lightweight gun); 1 × 20 mm (0.8 in) Phalanx CIWS; 2 × 25 mm (0.98 in) Mk 38 machine gun system; 4 × 0.50 in (12.7 mm) caliber guns; Missiles: 1 × 32-cell, 1 × 64-cell (96 total cells) Mk 41 vertical launching system (VLS): RIM-66M surface-to-air missile; RIM-156 surface-to-air missile; RIM-174A Standard ERAM; RIM-161 anti-ballistic missile; RIM-162 ESSM (quad-packed); BGM-109 Tomahawk cruise missile; RUM-139 vertical launch ASROC; Torpedoes: 2 × Mark 32 triple torpedo tubes: Mark 46 lightweight torpedo; Mark 50 lightweight torpedo; Mark 54 lightweight torpedo
- Aircraft carried: 2 × MH-60R Seahawk helicopters
- Aviation facilities: Double hangar and helipad

USS Harvey C. Barnum Jr. (DDG-124) is an Arleigh Burke-class (Flight IIA Technology Insertion) Aegis guided missile destroyer. She was named in honor of Harvey C. Barnum Jr., a retired United States Marine Corps officer who received the Medal of Honor for valor during the Vietnam War. Colonel Barnum served as deputy assistant secretary of the Navy (Reserve Affairs) and as acting assistant secretary of the Navy (Manpower and Reserve Affairs).

In a press release from General Dynamics, the parent company of Bath Iron Works, it was announced that the United States Navy had awarded funding for the planning and construction of DDG-124, for fiscal year 2016. The $644.3 million contract modification fully funds this ship, and was awarded as part of a multi-year competition for Arleigh Burke-class destroyers awarded in 2013.

On April 11, 2026, Harvey C. Barnum Jr. was commissioned into the US Navy.
