= Thomas H. Robbins Jr. =

United States Navy admiral (1900–1972)

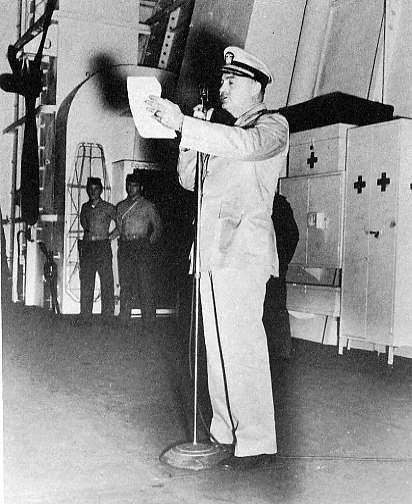
- Robbins as a captain
- Born: 11 May 1900; Paris, France
- Died: 12 December 1972 (aged 72); New London, Connecticut, US
- Burial place: United States Naval Academy Cemetery, Annapolis, Maryland
- Relatives: William Bradford (ancestor); Thomas Hinckley (ancestor); Fisher Ames (great-great-grandfather)
- Military career
- Allegiance: United States of America
- Branch: United States Navy
- Service years: 1919–1962
- Rank: Rear Admiral
- Commands: USS Sandpiper (AM-51); USS Lexington (CV-16); Carrier Division 17; Carrier Division 2; President of the Naval War College; President, Naval Discharge Review Board; Commandant, Potomac River Naval Command
- Conflicts: World War II; Pacific War; Battle of Okinawa; Battle of Luzon; Japan campaign
- Awards: Legion of Merit (two awards, 1945 and 1962, 1945 award with Combat "V"); Commendation Ribbon (1944); Presidential Unit Citation (three awards); World War I Victory Medal with Silver Star; American Defense Service Medal (two awards); American Campaign Medal; Asiatic–Pacific Campaign Medal (five awards); World War II Victory Medal; Navy Occupation Service Medal; National Defense Service Medal (two awards); Philippine Liberation Medal (two awards)

Thomas Hinckley Robbins Jr. (11 May 1900 – 12 December 1972) was a rear admiral of the United States Navy. A naval aviator, his career included command of an aircraft carrier during World War II, service as a key advisor to the United States Secretary of the Navy, and a tour as President of the Naval War College.

Robbins' ancestors included William Bradford (1590-1657), the first governor of the Massachusetts Bay Colony, and Thomas Hinckley (1618-1706), a governor of Plymouth Colony. His great-great-grandfather was Fisher Ames (1758-1808), a Massachusetts politician who served in the United States House of Representatives.

== Naval career ==
Robbins was born on 11 May 1900 in Paris, France, the son of Thomas Hinckley Robbins Sr. (9 April 1877 – 14 November 1954), and the former Alice Ames (23 September 1873 – 23 October 1951). He entered the United States Naval Academy in Annapolis, Maryland, as a member of the Class of 1920, but his curriculum was accelerated due to the entry of the United States into World War I on 6 April 1917, and he graduated in 1919.

=== Interwar ===
Between 1919 and 1922, Robbins served consecutively aboard the troop transport USS Kroonland (ID-1541), the battleship USS Utah (BB-31), and the destroyer USS Sturtevant (DD-240). From 1922 to 1924, he was assigned to the armed yacht USS Scorpion (PY-3) in Turkish waters, also seeing service aboard the submarine chaser USS SC-96 in the Black Sea in 1923 and 1924. In 1924 and 1925 he served first aboard the destroyer USS MacLeish (DD-220), then aboard the destroyer USS McFarland (DD-237). He then was an instructor at the U.S. Naval Academy from 1925 to 1927, before reporting to the battleship Utah in 1928 for a second tour aboard her.

While aboard Utah in 1928, Robbins – by now a lieutenant – was ordered to Naval Air Station Pensacola in Pensacola, Florida, for flight training, and he was designated Naval Aviator No. 3426 later that year. He served his first aviation tour as a member of Scouting Squadron 5 (VS-5) aboard the light cruiser USS Concord (CL-10) from 1928 to 1929, followed by duty as the executive officer of Scouting Squadron 6 (VS-6) aboard the light cruiser USS Cincinnati (CL-6) from 1929 to 1931. From 1931 to 1932 he was the assistant operations officer at Naval Air Station Anacostia in Washington, D.C., after that serving as aide to the chief of the Bureau of Aeronautics at the United States Department of the Navy in Washington from 1932 to 1933.

Robbins became commanding officer of the minesweeper/aircraft tender USS Sandpiper (AM-51) in 1933. While he was in command, Sandpiper operated in the waters of the Territory of Alaska and took part in the Aleutian Islands survey expedition of 1935. Leaving Sandpiper in 1935, he was assigned to Scouting Squadron 4 (VS-4) aboard the aircraft carrier USS Langley (CV-1). He entered the Naval War College in Newport, Rhode Island, in 1936, graduating in 1937. He then became aviation officer at the Naval Torpedo Station at Newport in 1937 before returning to the Naval War College to serve on its staff from 1938 to 1939.

Robbins' next tour was as navigator of the aircraft carrier USS Lexington (CV-2) from 1939 to 1940, followed by duty in 1940 and 1941 as aviation officer on the staff of the Commander, Scouting Force, and Commander, Task Force 3. Later in 1941 he became the Chief of Naval Operations' liaison officer to the Commanding General of the Army Air Forces Command in Washington, D.C., the position he held when the United States entered World War II on 7 December 1941.

=== World War II ===
In 1942, Robbins became liaison officer from Headquarters, Commander-in-Chief, United States Fleet, to the U.S. Army Air Forces Combat Command in Washington, D.C. Later in 1942, he became aviation plans officer for Headquarters, Commander-in-Chief, United States Fleet. In 1943 he moved on to become naval aviation officer at the Army-Navy Staff College in Washington. In 1944, he received a temporary assignment to Air Force, United States Pacific Fleet, embarked aboard the aircraft carrier USS Essex (CV-9).

On 30 January 1945, Robbins – by then a captain – became commanding officer of the aircraft carrier USS Lexington (CV-16). While he was in command, Lexington participated in strikes against Tokyo, Japan, in February 1945 in support of the Iwo Jima campaign and against Japanese forces on Iwo Jima itself. After an overhaul in the United States, Lexington returned to action, attacking Japanese forces on Luzon in June 1945 during the Luzon campaign and participating in heavy strikes against Japan itself in July and August 1945, when the war ended. Immediately after the war, Robbins oversaw Lexington's efforts to air-drop supplies to Allied prisoners-of-war in Japan in advance of their liberation by occupying American forces. Lexington was the first Essex-class aircraft carrier to enter Tokyo Bay after the war, and she was anchored there on 16 November 1945 when Robbins was promoted to rear admiral and left the ship for assignments in Washington, D.C. He received the Legion of Merit with Combat Distinguishing Device (Combat "V") for his tour aboard Lexington.

=== Postwar ===
Between 1945 and 1948, Robbins served consecutively in the Office of the Deputy Chief of Naval Operations for Air, the Office of the Chief of Naval Operations, and the Office of the United States Secretary of the Navy, and became a key advisor to Secretary of the Navy James Forrestal while Forrestal was overseeing the completion of the Navy's transition from an orientation toward battleships to one toward aircraft carriers. In February 1947, Robbins read of a United States Army Air Forces plan to fly the P-82 Twin Mustang fighter Betty Jo nonstop from Honolulu, Hawaii, to New York City. He suggested that the Navy have a P2V-1 Neptune patrol plane take off from Honolulu within 30 minutes of the P-82's departure and beat the P-82 to New York in order to steal the day's glory from the Army Air Forces, but the Navy did not follow up on his idea.

From 1948 to 1949, Robbins was the commander of Carrier Division 17. He was the U.S. Navy member of the Joint Chiefs of Staff's Joint Strategic Survey Committee in Washington, D.C., from 1949 to 1952, then served as the commander of Carrier Division 2 from 1952 to 1953.

Robbins became chief of staff of the Naval War College in 1953. When the tour of the college's 28th president, Vice Admiral Richard L. Conolly, ended on 2 November 1953. Robbins served as acting president until the 29th president, Vice Admiral Lynde D. McCormick, began his tour on 3 May 1954, after which Robbins served as McCormick's chief of staff. When McCormick became the first of the college's presidents to die in office on 16 August 1956, Robbins again became acting president, serving in this capacity until himself becoming the college's 30th president on 5 September 1956. During his presidency, Robbins instituted a new course for senior officers of foreign navies that McCormick had established before his death.

After leaving the college on 1 August 1957, Robbins became President of the Naval Discharge Review Board at the Bureau of Naval Personnel at the Department of the Navy in Washington, D.C., the first Naval War College president since World War II to remain in active Navy service after his presidency. Leaving the board in 1960, he became Commandant of the Potomac River Naval Command, Naval Weapons Plant, Washington, D.C., receiving a gold star in lieu of a second award of the Legion of Merit for his service in that capacity between August 1960 and May 1962.

Upon conclusion of his tour in the Potomac River Naval Command, Robbins retired from the Navy as a rear admiral in 1962.

== Personal life ==
Robbins married the former Barbara Little (30 June 1904 – 16 May 2000) in 1930. They had a daughter, Barbara Robbins Armstrong.

== Death ==
Robbins died on 12 December 1972 in New London, Connecticut. He is buried at the United States Naval Academy Cemetery.

== Awards ==
- Legion of Merit (two awards, one with Combat "V")
- Navy Commendation Ribbon
- Presidential Unit Citation (three awards)
- World War I Victory Medal with Silver Star
- American Defense Service Medal (two awards)
- American Campaign Medal
- Asiatic–Pacific Campaign Medal (five awards)
- World War II Victory Medal
- Navy Occupation Service Medal
- National Defense Service Medal (two awards)
- Philippine Liberation Medal (two awards)

== Notes ==
Military offices
Preceded by Lynde D. McCormick	President of the Naval War College; 5 September 1956–1 August 1957	Succeeded by Stuart H. Ingersoll
