= Edward Hidalgo =

American attorney (1912–1995)

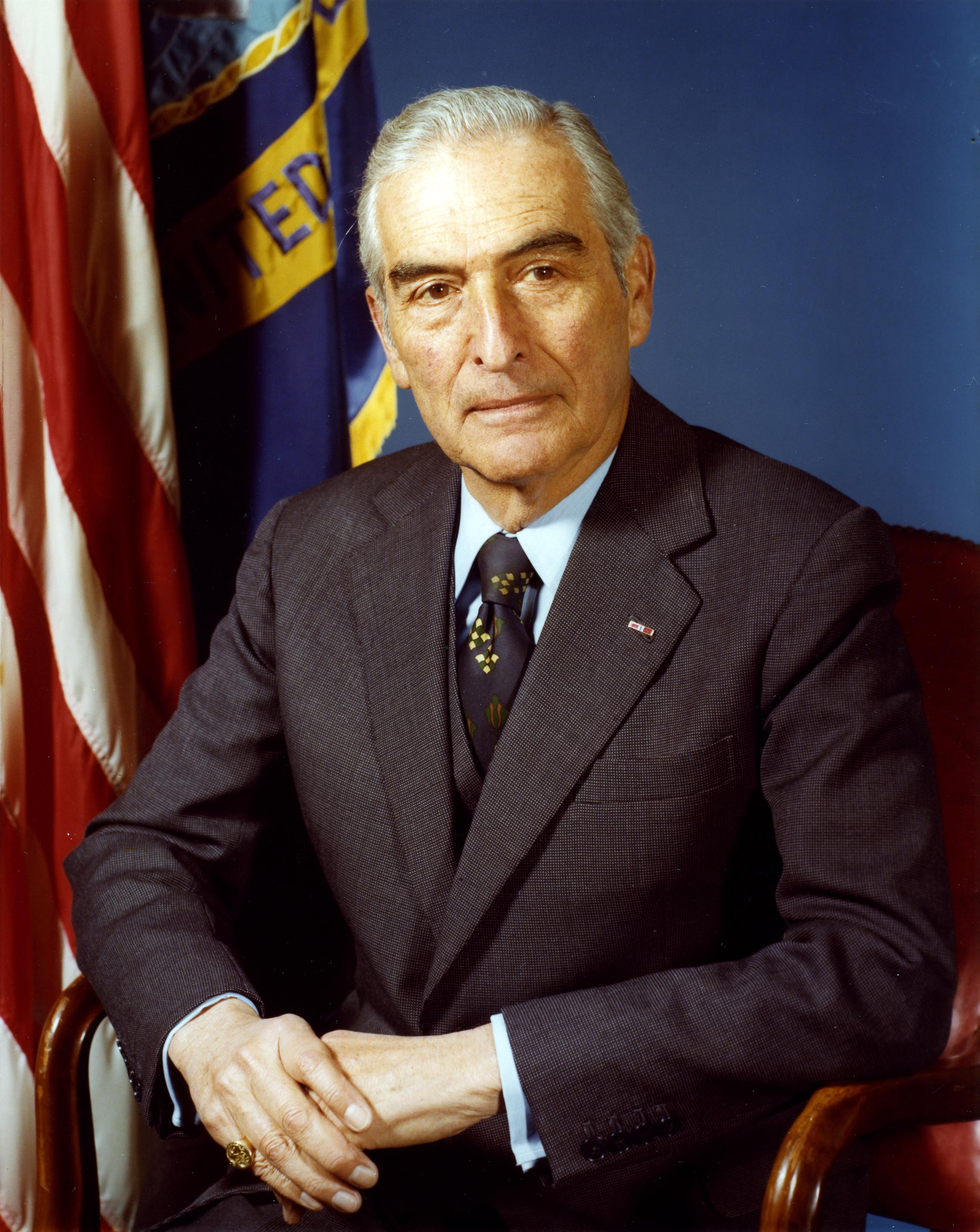
- Official portrait, 1979

64th United States Secretary of the Navy
- In office October 24, 1979 – January 20, 1981
- President: Jimmy Carter
- Preceded by: W. Graham Claytor Jr.
- Succeeded by: John Lehman

Assistant Secretary of the Navy for Manpower and Reserve Affairs
- In office April 25, 1977 – October 19, 1979
- Preceded by: Joseph T. McCullen Jr.
- Succeeded by: Joseph A. Doyle

Personal details
- Born: Eduardo Hidalgo; October 12, 1912 Mexico City, Mexico
- Died: January 21, 1995 (aged 82) Fairfax, Virginia, U.S.
- Education: College of the Holy Cross (BA); Columbia University (JD); University of Mexico (DCL)

Military service
- Branch/service: United States Navy
- Rank: Lieutenant
- Battles/wars: World War II; Pacific Theater
- Awards: Bronze Star (1943); Commendation Medal (1945)

Edward Kunhardt Hidalgo (born Eduardo Hidalgo; October 12, 1912 – January 21, 1995) was a Mexican-American attorney who served as United States Secretary of the Navy from 1979 to 1981. Appointed by President Jimmy Carter, he was the first Hispanic American to serve in the office and promoted the recruitment of Hispanics for high command.

Hidalgo previously served as Assistant Secretary of the Navy for Manpower and Reserve Affairs from April 1977 to October 1979.

== Early life and education ==
Hidalgo was born in Mexico City on October 12, 1912, to Egon and Domita Kunhardt Hidalgo. The family moved in 1918 to the United States and settled in New York City. Raised in the U.S., Hidalgo became a naturalized American citizen and anglicized his name to Edward.

Hidalgo attended the College of the Holy Cross in Worcester, Massachusetts, where he was a member of the debate team, graduated magna cum laude in 1933 as class salutatorian, and delivered a salutatory address titled "Peace among Nations." Among the students there, he was voted the "most energetic" and "most brilliant" member of the undergraduate class. He then earned his Juris Doctor (J.D.) from Columbia Law School in 1936. He later attended the National Autonomous University of Mexico, earning a Doctor of Civil Law in 1959.

== Early career ==
After graduating from law school, Hidalgo was a law clerk at the United States Court of Appeals for the Second Circuit from 1936 to 1937, then became an associate attorney at the New York law firm of Wright, Gordon, Zachry & Parlin, where he stayed from 1937 to 1942.

The onset of World War II interrupted Hidalgo's private practice. He became a lieutenant in the U.S. Navy from 1942 to 1946, during which period he served as a legal advisor to the Emergency Advisory for Political Defense in Montevideo in 1942–1943. For the rest of the war he was an intelligence officer stationed on the USS Enterprise (CV-6) assigned on air combat. He served as a special assistant to U.S. Secretary of the Navy James Forrestal from 1945 to 1946, and was awarded a Bronze Star Medal for his service on the Enterprise and the Commendation Medal for contributions to the Eberstadt Report committee.

After his war service he resumed his career, running the Mexico City office of the legal firm of Curtis, Mallet-Prevost, Colt & Mosle before becoming a founding partner in 1948 of Barrera, Siqueiros & Torres Landa, also in Mexico, where he remained until 1965.

From 1965 to 1966 he served as Special Assistant to the Secretary of the Navy, Paul H. Nitze, and then resumed legal work from 1966 to 1972 as a partner in the law firm of Cahill, Gordon & Reindel, in charge of their European office. In 1972 he left the firm to resume government service as Special Assistant for Economic Affairs to the Director of the US Information Agency. The following year he became General Counsel and Congressional Liaison of the Agency.

== Secretary of the Navy ==
Hidalgo served from April 25, 1977, as Assistant Secretary of the Navy (Manpower, Reserve Affairs and Logistics). He was succeeded by Joseph A. Doyle. On September 13, 1979, President Jimmy Carter announced the nomination of Hidalgo as Secretary of the Navy, replacing W. Graham Claytor, Jr. One of his priorities was recruitment of Hispanics into the Navy, particularly in the officer corps.

The Vice Admiral James Bond Stockdale Award for Inspirational Leadership, a United States Navy award, was established in 1980 by Hidalgo to honor the inspirational leadership of James Stockdale, a Medal of Honor recipient in the Vietnam War, who exhibited exemplary leadership while a prisoner of war in North Vietnam for nearly eight years. The award was first presented in 1981.

== Later career and controversy ==
After his term as Secretary of the Navy he became a consultant with General Dynamics Corporation, a defense contractor that he had negotiated a $643 million settlement with while Secretary of the Navy. He was paid $66,000 for his services which he said were related to the Air Force's F-16 program.

== Personal life and death ==
Hidalgo was married 3 times, the first two ending in divorce and the third with his death in 1995 from cardiac arrest. He had four children. He is buried in Arlington National Cemetery.

== Awards ==
- 1943: Bronze Star Medal, U.S. Navy
- 1945: Special Commendation Ribbon, U.S. Navy
- 1963: Knight of the Royal Order of Vasa, Kingdom of Sweden
- 1980: Order of the Aztec Eagle, Republic of Mexico

== Additional sources ==
- Milite, George A. (2003-12-30). "Edward Hidalgo (1912–1995): U.S. Secretary of the Navy". In Henderson, Ashyia N.; Zerbonia, Ralph G. (eds.). Contemporary Hispanic Biography. Vol. 4. Thomson Gale. pp. 109–111. ISBN 0-7876-7151-7. ISSN 1541-1524.

Government offices
Preceded by Joseph T. McCullen, Jr.	Assistant Secretary of the Navy (Manpower and Reserve Affairs); April 1977 – October 1979	Succeeded by Joseph A. Doyle
Preceded by W. Graham Claytor, Jr.	United States Secretary of the Navy; October 24, 1979 – January 20, 1981	Succeeded by John Lehman
