= Mac Cuilinn =

Notable Irish surname that indicates descendants of medieval Celtic royalty

MacCuillinn or Mac Cuillann is an Irish surname. The name is the patronymic form of a personal name derived from cuileann (translation from Irish Gaelic: holly). The name has become Anglicised as MacCullen & McCullen, and MacQuillan & McQuillan. The name appears in Irish mythology. The family are thought to have been Celtic Kings between the 5th and 12th century.

Saint Macculind (or Macallan, MacCuilinn, Macculin Dus, Maculinus; died c. 497) was an early Irish saint who was abbot or bishop of Lusk.

== Sources ==
- O'Hanlon, John (1873), Lives of the Irish saints This article incorporates text from this source, which is in the public domain.
