= Secretary of the Navy Council of Review Boards =

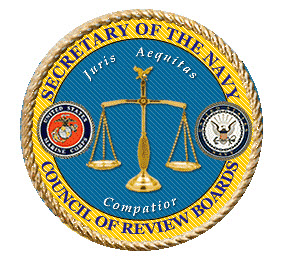
Seal of the Secretary of the Navy Council of Review Boards

The Secretary of the Navy Council of Review Boards (CORB) is an organization within the United States Department of the Navy that reviews cases, conducts hearings, and renders decisions on behalf of the United States Secretary of the Navy. It was formerly known as the Naval Council of Personnel Boards and Naval Council of Review Boards.

CORB is composed of five boards:

- Physical Evaluation Board
- Naval Discharge Review Board
- Naval Clemency and Parole Board
- Combat Related Special Compensation Board
- Navy Department Board of Decorations and Medals

These boards allow military and civilian personnel of the United States Navy and the United States Marine Corps to challenge personnel decisions that impact them.

CORB is under the oversight of the Assistant Secretary of the Navy (Manpower and Reserve Affairs).
