= USS John F. Lehman =

Guided missile destroyer

History

United States
- Name: John F. Lehman
- Namesake: John Lehman
- Awarded: 27 September 2018
- Builder: Ingalls Shipbuilding
- Identification: Hull number: DDG-137
- Status: Authorized

General characteristics
- Class & type: Arleigh Burke-class destroyer
- Displacement: 9,217 tons (full load)
- Length: 510 ft (160 m)
- Beam: 66 ft (20 m)
- Installed power: 3 x Rolls-Royce AG9160RF with 4MW MT5-S HE Gensets gas turbines
- Propulsion: 4 × General Electric LM2500 gas turbines 100,000 shp (75,000 kW)
- Speed: 31 knots (57 km/h; 36 mph)
- Complement: 380 officers and enlisted
- Armament: Guns: 1 × 5-inch (127 mm)/62 Mk 45 Mod 4 (lightweight gun); 1 × 20 mm (0.8 in) Phalanx CIWS; 2 × 25 mm (0.98 in) Mk 38 machine gun system; 4 × 0.50 in (12.7 mm) caliber guns; Missiles: 1 × 32-cell, 1 × 64-cell (96 total cells) Mk 41 vertical launching system (VLS): RIM-66M surface-to-air missile; RIM-156 surface-to-air missile; RIM-174A Standard ERAM; RIM-161 anti-ballistic missile; RIM-162 ESSM (quad-packed); BGM-109 Tomahawk cruise missile; RUM-139 vertical launch ASROC; Torpedoes: 2 × Mark 32 triple torpedo tubes: Mark 46 lightweight torpedo; Mark 50 lightweight torpedo; Mark 54 lightweight torpedo
- Armor: Kevlar-type armor with steel hull. Numerous passive survivability measures.
- Aircraft carried: 2 × MH-60R Seahawk helicopters
- Aviation facilities: Double hangar and helipad

USS John F. Lehman (DDG-137) is the planned 87th Arleigh Burke-class (Flight III) Aegis guided missile destroyer of the United States Navy. She will honor John Lehman, who was U.S. Secretary of the Navy during 1981–1987 under the Ronald Reagan administration. During his tenure, he pushed for the creation of a 600-ship Navy.
