= Kenneth P. Bergquist (Department of Defense) =

American brigadier general (1944–2023)

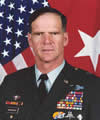
Brigadier General Kenneth P. Bergquist

Kenneth Paul Bergquist Jr. (July 12, 1944 – June 7, 2023) was an American brigadier general. He served as the United States Assistant Secretary of the Navy (Manpower and Reserve Affairs) from 1988 to 1989.

== Biography ==
Kenneth Bergquist was born in 1944 in Washington, D.C. while his father Kenneth Bergquist Sr. was serving in the United States Army Air Forces during World War II. He attended the Phillips Academy until March 1960 before transferring to Concord High School, graduating in 1962. He then attended the United States Naval Academy for two years before transferring to Stanford University, graduating with a B.A. in 1967.

Upon graduation, Bergquist joined the United States Army and served in the army until 1974. For two of his years in the army, he saw action in the Vietnam War in Vietnam and Cambodia. For his combat service, he was awarded the Silver Star, six Bronze Stars and two Purple Hearts.

Bergquist left the army in 1974, but remained a member of the United States Army Reserve. Starting in 1974, Bergquist attended the University of Texas School of Law, receiving his J.D. in 1977.

After law school, Bergquist joined the Central Intelligence Agency as an intelligence officer and paramilitary officer. He then joined the staff of United States Senator Alan K. Simpson (R—Wyoming) as Legislative Counsel. He next became Chief Counsel and Staff Director of the United States Senate Committee on Veterans' Affairs.

In 1983, Bergquist became deputy assistant secretary for readiness, force management and training at the United States Department of the Army. In 1986, he became deputy assistant attorney general in the United States Department of Justice's Office of Legislative Affairs.

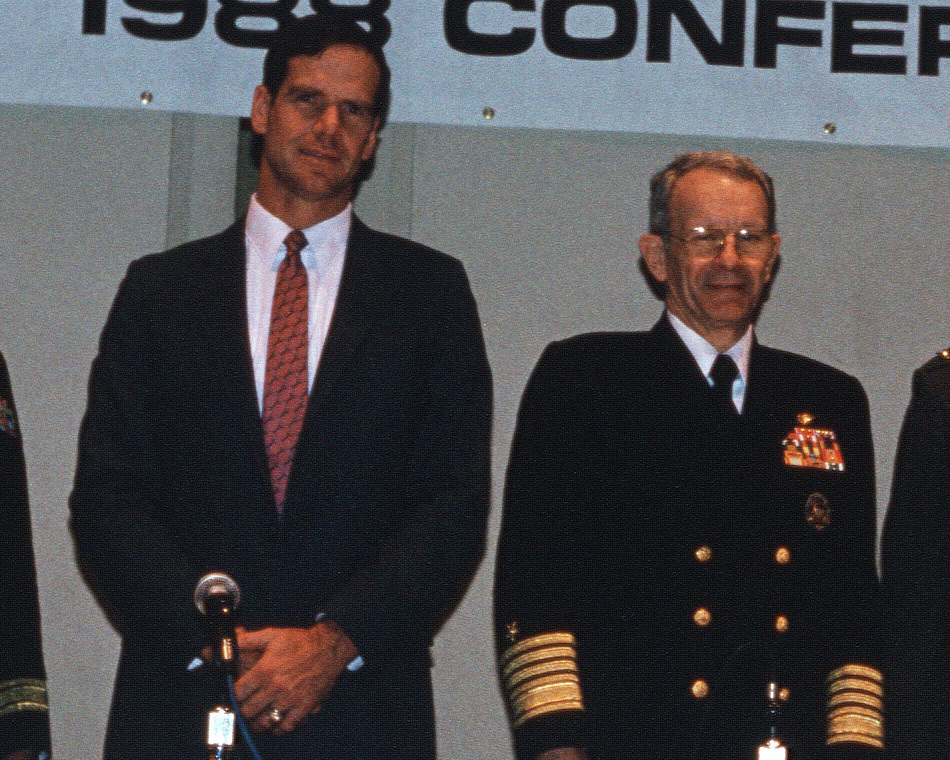
Kenneth Berquist with Vice Chief of Naval Operations Leon A. Edney in November 1988

On June 9, 1987, President of the United States Ronald Reagan announced the nomination of Bergquist as Assistant Secretary of Defense (Special Operations and Low Intensity Conflict). Less than a year later, President Reagan nominated Bergquist as Assistant Secretary of the Navy (Manpower and Reserve Affairs), and Bergquist subsequently held this office from June 1988 until November 1989.

Bergquist later served as Associate Coordinator for Counterterrorism.

In 2001, at the request of the Chairman of the Joint Chiefs of Staff and the commander of the United States Special Operations Command (General Charles R. Holland), Bergquist was recalled to active duty with the rank of brigadier general in order to become the first president of the new Joint Special Operations University, set up to educate intermediate and senior personnel of the Special Operations Forces and senior personnel in the Joint Special Operations Command.

In the wake of the September 11 attacks, Bergquist was assigned to United States Central Command as special operations staff director for Operation Enduring Freedom. In this capacity, he oversaw Unconventional Warfare and Special Operations during the War in Afghanistan.

Bergquist retired from active duty in July 2002 and served as an independent crisis management and risk mitigation consultant and was affiliated with a number of companies. Bergquist has been responsible for managing the execution of approximately $100 million of various security and national security related projects in both the Middle East and in the United States. Bergquist was associated with Jankel Tactical Systems of the United Kingdom.

Kenneth P. Bergquist Jr. died on June 7, 2023, at the age of 78.

== Sources ==
- Press Release on Announcement of Bergquist's Appointment as an Assistant Secretary of Defense Archived 2011-06-22 at the Wayback Machine
- Profile from Maritime Security Institute

Government offices
Preceded by Chase Untermeyer	Assistant Secretary of the Navy (Manpower and Reserve Affairs); June 1988 – November 1989	Succeeded by Barbara S. Pope
