= Harvey C. Barnum Jr. =

US Marine (1940-)

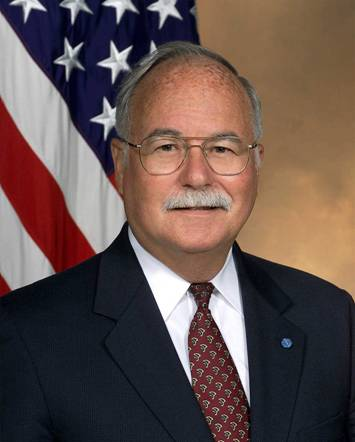

Assistant Secretary of the Navy (Manpower and Reserve Affairs)
- Acting; January 20, 2009 – September 16, 2009
- President: Barack Obama
- Preceded by: Anita K. Blair
- Succeeded by: Juan M. Garcia III

Personal details
- Born: July 21, 1940 (age 86) Cheshire, Connecticut, U.S.
- Spouse: Martha Hill (m. 1992)
- Education: Saint Anselm College (BA)
- Nickname: "Barney"

Military service
- Allegiance: United States
- Branch/service: United States Marine Corps
- Years of service: 1962–1989
- Rank: Colonel
- Unit: 1st Battalion, 12th Marines; 2nd Battalion, 9th Marines; 2nd Marine Aircraft Wing; 2nd Battalion, 10th Marines
- Commands: Battery E, 2nd Battalion, 12th Marines; 2nd Battalion, Recruit Training Regiment
- Battles/wars: Vietnam War; Operation Harvest Moon
- Awards: Medal of Honor; Defense Superior Service Medal; Legion of Merit; Bronze Star Medal (2); Purple Heart

Harvey Curtiss Barnum Jr. (born July 21, 1940) is a retired United States Marine Corps officer who received the Medal of Honor during the Vietnam War. He was the fourth Marine to receive the medal for actions in Vietnam. He retired from the Marine Corps in 1989 after more than 27 years of service. Barnum served as Deputy Assistant Secretary of the Navy for Reserve Affairs from July 23, 2001, to January 20, 2008. He also served as Acting Assistant Secretary of the Navy (Manpower and Reserve Affairs) from January 21 to April 30, 2009.

== Early life and education ==
Barnum was born July 21, 1940, in Cheshire, Connecticut. He was president of his Freshman and Senior Class at Cheshire High School, where he also played football and baseball. In high school, he was a member of the Boy Scouts of America, the “C” Club and the Gym Leaders Club. After graduation from high school, he entered Saint Anselm College in Goffstown, New Hampshire.

== Marine Corps ==
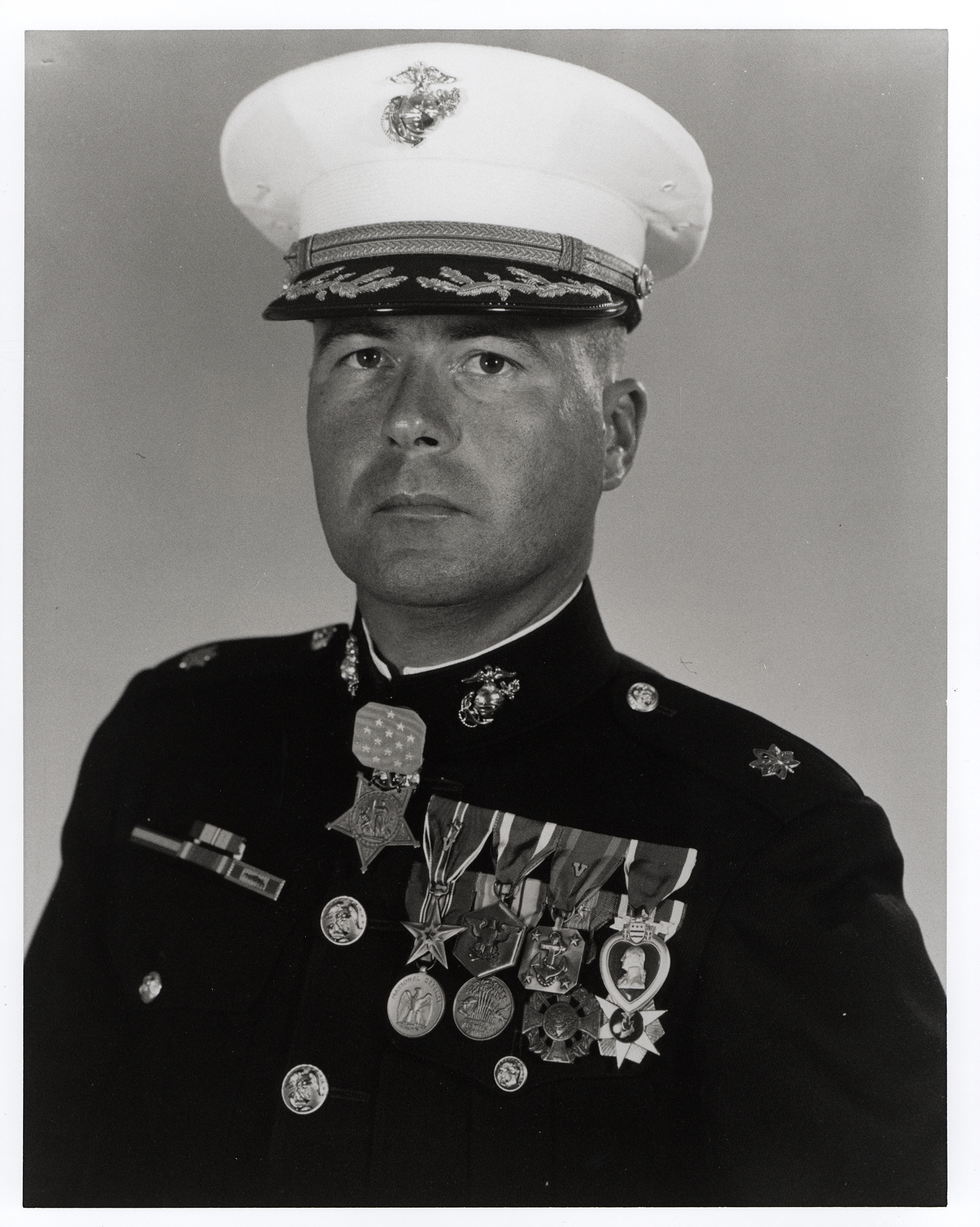
Barnum in uniform

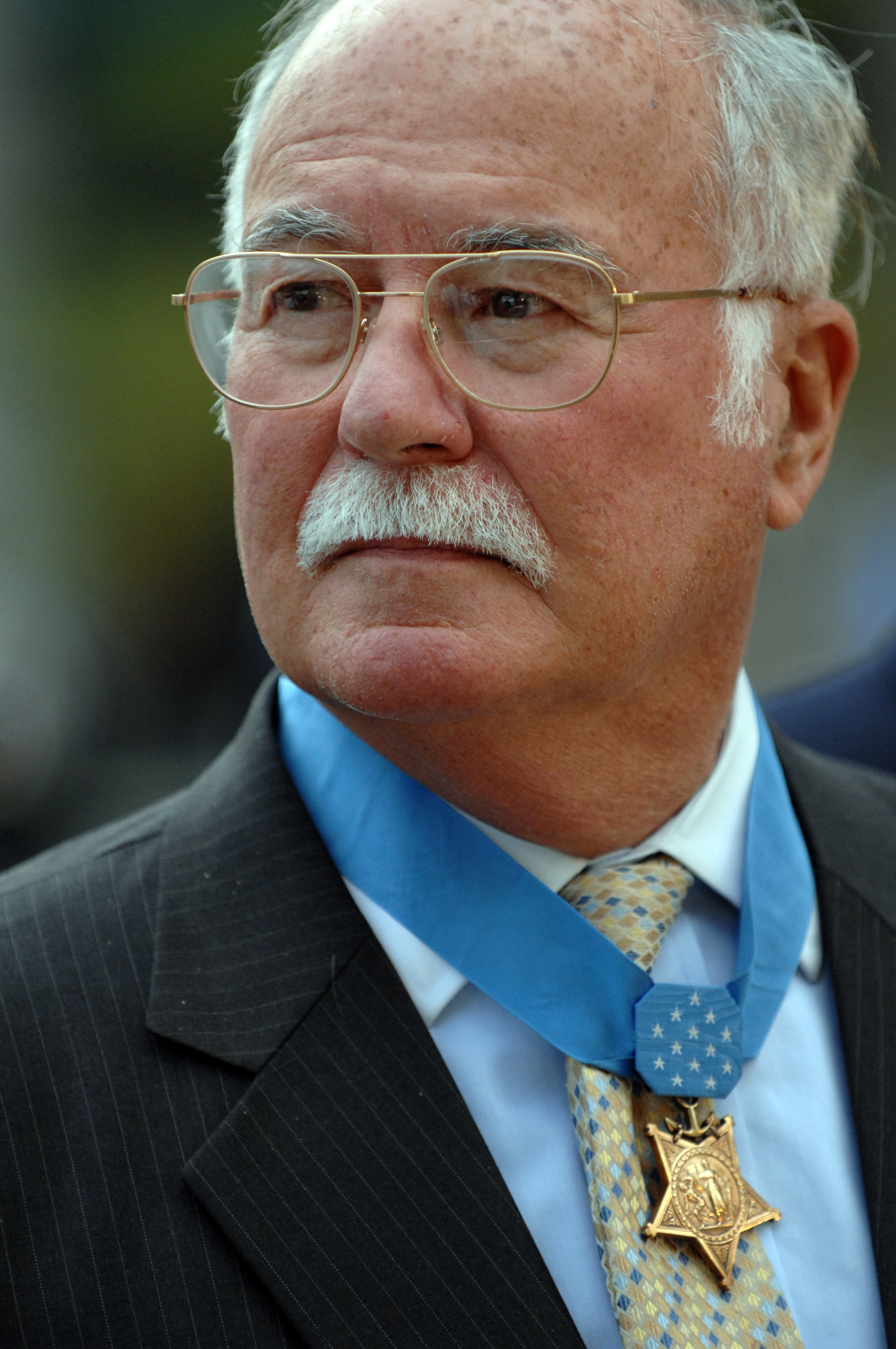
Barnum in October 2007

At Saint Anselm College, Barnum joined the Marine Corps’ Platoon Leaders Class program in November 1958, and attended two summer training sessions, one in 1959 and the other in 1961. In June 1962, he graduated from Saint Anselm College with a Bachelor of Arts degree in Economics. He is a member of the Red Key Society (Rho Kappa Sigma) at Saint Anselm College. Upon graduation, he was commissioned a Marine Reserve second lieutenant.

Second Lieutenant Barnum was ordered to Marine Corps Schools, Quantico, Virginia, where he attended The Basic School until December 1962, when he began the Artillery Officers Orientation Course, graduating in February 1963. He was then ordered overseas and joined Battery A, 1st Battalion, 12th Marines, 3rd Marine Division on Okinawa, Japan. He served first as a forward observer and then as the battalion's liaison officer. In July 1964, he accepted appointment in the regular Marine Corps. Prior to completing his Okinawa tour, he also served as the battalion liaison officer. He was promoted to first lieutenant in December 1964. In April 1964, Barnum was transferred to the 2nd Marine Aircraft Wing and assigned as the wing's Career Advisory and Personal Affairs Officer. During Exercise Steel Pike, a landing exercise in Spain, he served as the wing's Security Officer. Upon returning to the United States from Spain, he was assigned as Officer in Charge, 2nd Marine Aircraft Wing Classified Files. Detached in March 1965, he then served as Guard Officer, Marine Barracks, Naval Base Pearl Harbor, Oahu, Hawaii.

From December 1965 until February 1966, Barnum served on temporary duty in Vietnam as an artillery forward observer with Company H, 2nd Battalion, 9th Marines, 3rd Marine Division. During Operation Harvest Moon, Barnum would be awarded the Medal of Honor for his actions on December 18, 1965 — for "conspicuous gallantry and intrepidity at the risk of his life above and beyond the call of duty". He had taken over command of a rifle company when its commander has been killed in action, and reorganized it for defense and successful evacuation after destroying the enemy.

Barnum was promoted to captain in June 1966, after he returned to Hawaii. From March until August 1967, Barnum attended the Associate Field Artillery Officers Career Course, Fort Sill, Oklahoma. Transferred to Headquarters Marine Corps, he served as Aide-de-Camp for Lieutenant General Lewis William Walt (then the Assistant Chief of Staff for Manpower and subsequently the Assistant Commandant from January 1968 until January 1971).

In October 1968, Barnum returned to South Vietnam where he served as Commanding Officer of Battery E, 2nd Battalion, 12th Marines, 3rd Marine Division. With the 3rd Marine Division redeployment from South Vietnam to Okinawa in September 1969, he remained with that unit until the following October. For his service with the battery in Vietnam, he was awarded the Bronze Star Medal with Combat "V" and Gold Star in lieu of a second award, the Navy Achievement Medal with Combat "V", the Purple Heart for wounds received, the Combat Action Ribbon, and the Vietnamese Gallantry Cross with Silver Star.

Upon his return from Okinawa, Barnum was assigned as a weapons instructor at The Basic School, Marine Corps Development and Education Command, Quantico, where he served until August 1970 at which time he entered the Amphibious Warfare School, graduating in February 1972. He served as Operations Officer, 2nd Battalion, 10th Marines, Camp Lejeune beginning in March 1972, and was promoted to major in May 1972, to lieutenant colonel in December 1978, and to colonel in February 1984. In 1987, he was assigned as Military Secretary to the 29th Commandant of the Marine Corps.

In 1978, Barnum served as Commanding Officer of Headquarters Company, Recruit Training Regiment, Parris Island, S.C. and subsequently served Commanding Officer of 2nd Battalion, Recruit Training Regiment, Parris Island, S.C. from 1979 to 1980. In August 1989, Barnum retired from the Marine Corps after more than 27 years of service.

== Later life ==
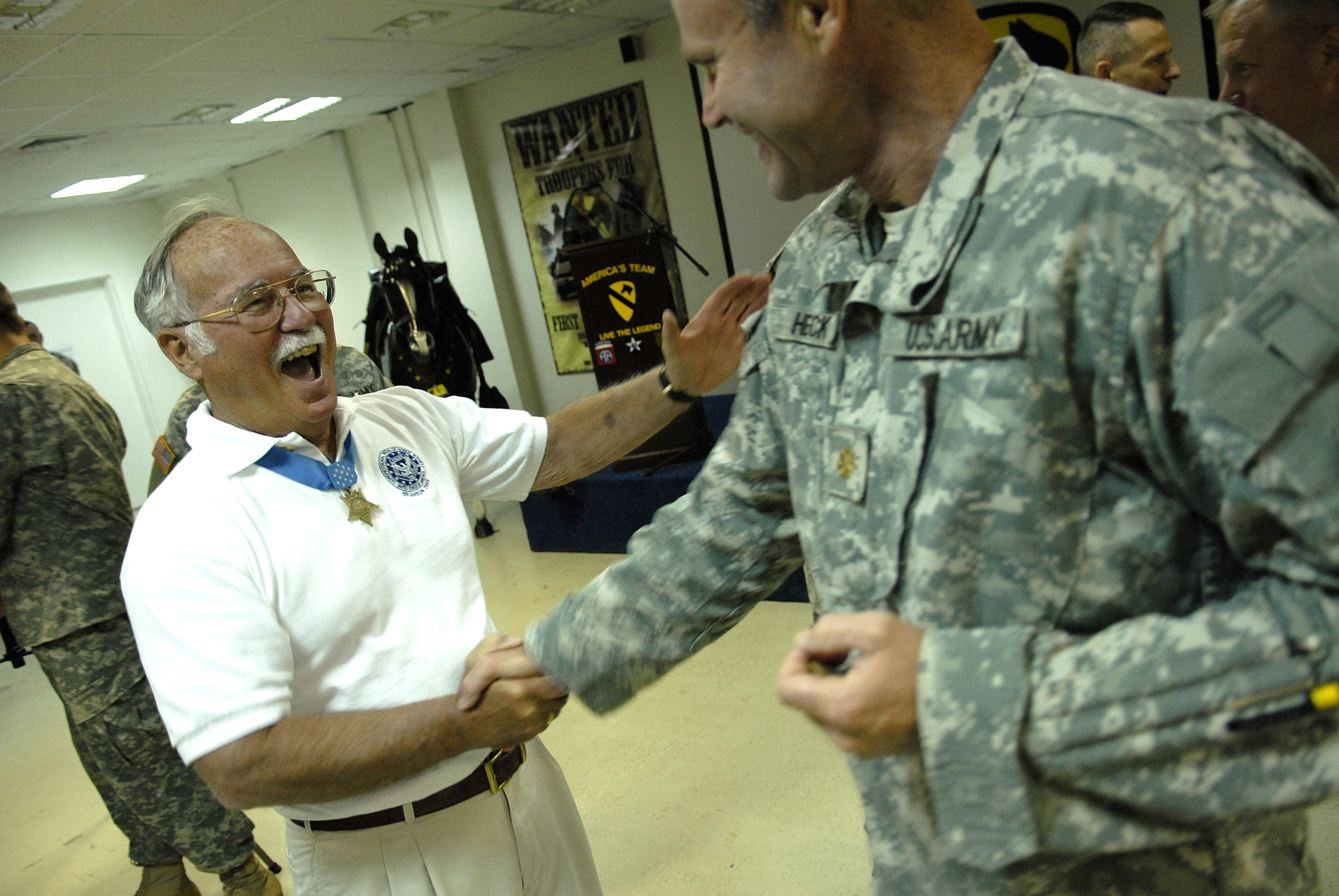
Barnum visiting troops in Iraq, 2007

Upon retirement Barnum served as the Principal Director, Drug Enforcement Policy, Office of the Secretary of Defense. He also served as past president of the Congressional Medal of Honor Society. Barnum then served as Deputy Assistant Secretary of the Navy for Reserve Affairs, a position he held from July 23, 2001, to January 20, 2008.

Barnum currently serves on the Segs4Vets and on the Pentagon Federal Credit Union Advisory Board. He also serves on the Board of Directors for the Marine Corps Law Enforcement Foundation MCLEF.org, the Americans in Wartime Museum and Medifast. He is also on the board of advisors of the Code of Support Foundation, a nonprofit military services organization.

Barnum received several awards throughout his career to include: Connecticut Man of the Year' 67, Honorary Legum Doctorem St Anselm College; Rotary Paul Harris Fellow; Abe Pollin Leadership Award '03, Marine Corps League "Iron Mike" Award; and Military Order of the Carabao Distinguished Service Award.

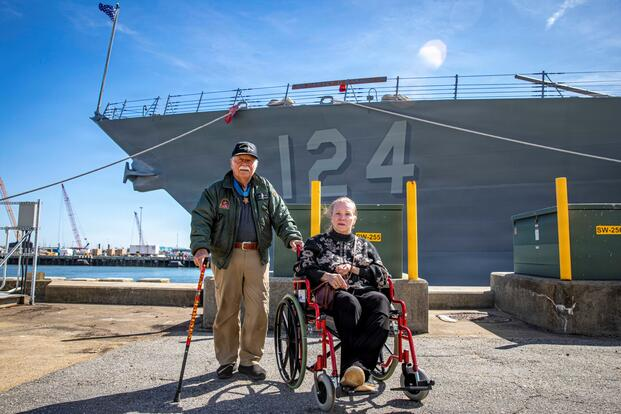
Barnum with his wife Martha Hill at Naval Station Norfolk following the arrival of the USS Harvey C. Barnum Jr. at the port.

Barnum is a member of the Ancient and Honorable Artillery Company of Massachusetts.

Barnum posed for a photo with his wife Martha Hill, the ship’s sponsor, following the arrival of the USS Harvey C. Barnum Jr. (DDG-124) at its homeport of Naval Station Norfolk, Virginia, the US Navy Arleigh Burke-class destroyer named after him.

== Awards and decorations ==
Barnum's medals include:

| Medal of Honor | | Defense Superior Service Medal | |
| Legion of Merit | Bronze Star w/ 1 award star & valor device | Purple Heart | Meritorious Service Medal |
| Navy and Marine Corps Commendation Medal | Navy and Marine Corps Achievement Medal w/ valor device | Combat Action Ribbon | Navy Presidential Unit Citation |
| Army Presidential Unit Citation | Joint Meritorious Unit Award | Navy Unit Commendation | Navy Meritorious Unit Commendation w/ 1 service star |
| Secretary of the Navy Distinguished Civilian Service Award | National Defense Service Medal | Vietnam Service Medal w/ 5 service stars | Navy Sea Service Deployment Ribbon |
| Vietnam Gallantry Cross w/ silver star | Vietnam Gallantry Cross unit citation | Republic of Vietnam Civil Actions Unit Citation | Vietnam Campaign Medal |
| Rifle Expert Marksmanship Badge | | Pistol Expert Marksmanship Badge | |

== Medal of Honor citation ==
The President of the United States in the name of the Congress takes pride in presenting the Medal of Honor to

First Lieutenant Harvey C. Barnum Jr.
United States Marine Corps

for service as set forth in the following Citation:

For conspicuous gallantry and intrepidity at the risk of his life above and beyond the call of duty as Forward Observer for Artillery, while attached to Company H, Second Battalion, Ninth Marines, Third Marine Division (Reinforced), in action against communist forces at Ky Phu in Quang Tin Province, Republic of Vietnam, on 18 December 1965. When the company was suddenly pinned down by a hail of extremely accurate enemy fire and was quickly separated from the remainder of the battalion by over five hundred meters of open and fire-swept ground, and casualties mounted rapidly, Lieutenant Barnum quickly made a hazardous reconnaissance of the area seeking targets for his artillery. Finding the rifle company commander mortally wounded and the radio operator killed, he, with complete disregard for his own safety, gave aid to the dying commander, then removed the radio from the dead operator and strapped it to himself. He immediately assumed command of the rifle company, and moving at once into the midst of the heavy fire, rallying and giving encouragement to all units, reorganized them to replace the loss of key personnel and led their attack on enemy positions from which deadly fire continued to come. His sound and swift decisions and his obvious calm served to stabilize the badly decimated units and his gallant example as he stood exposed repeatedly to point out targets served as an inspiration to all. Provided with two armed helicopters, he moved fearlessly through enemy fire to control the air attack against the firmly entrenched enemy while skillfully directing one platoon in a successful counterattack in the key enemy positions. Having thus cleared a small area, he requested and directed the landing of two transport helicopters for the evacuation of the dead and wounded. He then assisted in the mopping up and final seizure of the battalion's objective. His gallant initiative and heroic conduct reflected great credit upon himself and were in keeping with the highest traditions of the Marine Corps and United States Naval Service.

/S/Lyndon B. Johnson

== Legacy ==
The United States Navy Arleigh Burke-class guided missile destroyer USS Harvey C. Barnum Jr. is named in his honor.

In 2025 the town of Cheshire announced they would name a new elementary school after Barnum.

== See also ==
- List of Medal of Honor recipients
- List of Medal of Honor recipients for the Vietnam War

Government offices
| Preceded by William A. Navas Jr. Anita K. Blair (acting) | Assistant Secretary of the Navy (Manpower and Reserve Affairs) (acting); January 2009 – October 2009 | Succeeded by Juan M. Garcia III |
