= Joseph T. McCullen Jr. =

American venture capitalist (born 1935)

Joseph T. McCullen Jr. (born March 15, 1935) is an American venture capitalist who served as United States Assistant Secretary of the Navy (Manpower and Reserve Affairs) from 1973 to 1977.

== Biography ==
Joseph T. McCullen Jr. was born in Philadelphia, Pennsylvania and was educated at Villanova University. McCullen spent several years in the United States armed forces, as Infantry Lieutenant and Navy Petty Officer.

In 1971, McCullen joined the Executive Office of the President of the United States as a Special Assistant to the President. In 1973, President of the United States Richard Nixon nominated McCullen as Assistant Secretary of the Navy (Manpower and Reserve Affairs), and McCullen subsequently held this office from September 1973 until April 1977.

After leaving government service, McCullen pursued a career in business, particularly in venture capital. From 1986 until 1999, he was a Managing Director of venture capital firm OneLiberty Ventures. In 1999, he moved to J.H. Whitney & Company as a Managing Director. In July 2001, he moved to McCullen Capital as a Managing Director. As a venture capitalist, McCullen has been one of the founding investors in and served on the Board of Directors of a number of companies, including TeleCorp, Brooks Fiber Properties, Intermedia Communications, MetroNet of Canada, and Extraprise.

McCullen's alma mater Villanova University awarded him an honorary PhD.

Government offices
Preceded by James E. Johnson	Assistant Secretary of the Navy (Manpower and Reserve Affairs); September 1973 – April 1977	Succeeded by Edward Hidalgo
