= McCullen =

McCullen is a surname. Notable people with the surname include:

- Aidan McCullen (born 1977), Irish businessman and rugby union player
- Dave McCullen (born 1977), Belgian record producer and musician
- Joseph T. McCullen Jr. (born 1935), American venture capitalist
- Sonja McCullen, American judge
