= Naval Clemency and Parole Board =

The Naval Clemency and Parole Board (NC&PB) is a board established by the United States Department of the Navy to serve as executive agent for the United States Secretary of the Navy to decide questions of clemency and parole for members of the United States Navy and United States Marine Corps who are convicted by a court-martial for a violation of the Uniform Code of Military Justice. It is located at the Washington Navy Yard.

The Navy Clemency and Parole Board was established by SECNAVINST 5815_3J.

NC&PB hearings are non-adversarial. The NC&PB is not the final say, and can ultimately be overridden by the Secretary of the Navy, and the Secretary takes special interest in cases involving an officer or a midshipman or issues of national security. In certain other cases, the NC&PB only makes recommendations to the Secretary, specifically issues where (1) any offense carrying a maximum penalty of 10 years or more; (2) any offense involving a victim under 16 years of age or the offender's spouse; and (3) cases where a release might lead to Congressional or media interest.

The NV&PB is a member of the Secretary of the Navy Council of Review Boards and is overseen by the Assistant Secretary of the Navy (Manpower and Reserve Affairs).
