= Latin American Section =

The Latin American Section was established as a partial successor to Special War Policies Unit (SWPU) on August 28, 1943. The Latin Section acted as the technical legal staff of the United States representative on the Emergency Advisory Committee for Political Defense, also known as the Inter-American Advisory Committee for Political Defense. The committee was created as an advisory body by Resolution XVII of the Third Meeting of the Ministers of Foreign Affairs of the American Republics, held at Rio de Janeiro in January 1942. The Resolution provided that the Governing Board of the Pan American Union (PAU) consult the Governments of the American Republics, determine the functions of the committee, prepare the regulations for governing its activities, and fix its budget of expenditures.

The report of the Special Committee of the Governing Board of the PAU was approved by the Board at its session on February 25, 1942, and was sent to the 21 Governments with the proposed regulations. The Governing Board gave approval of these two documents on April 6, 1942, and named the Governments of Argentina, Brazil, Chile, United States, Mexico, Uruguay, and Venezuela to be members of the Committee who would represent the 21 nations. Carl B. Spaeth and William Sanders were successively members from the United States.

In each country a liaison officer was named to serve the members of the Committee headquartered in Montevideo. Lawrence A. Knapp, Special Assistant to the Attorney General, was Liaison Office for the United States. Miguel A. de Capriles, Special Assistant to the Attorney General, was assigned to the staff of the Liaison Officer for the United States. He also served as Assistant Chief of the Latin American Section. The Committee for Political Defense attempted to establish a solid front of the Americas against common external dangers. The Committee recommended ways that the Governments of the Americas, acting individually and as a group, could prevent invasions by Axis powers or their nationals, agents, or sympathizers.

The section was terminated with War Division, December 28, 1945.

== Sources ==
- National Archives and Records Administration
