= Assistant Secretary of the Navy (Manpower and Reserve Affairs) =

Civilian office in the US Department of the Navy

Assistant Secretary of the Navy for Manpower and Reserve Affairs
- Seal of the Department of the Navy

- Incumbent; Benjamin Kohlmann since December 23, 2025
- Style: Mr. Secretary; The Honorable (formal address in writing)
- Reports to: Secretary of the Navy; Under Secretary of the Navy
- Seat: The Pentagon, Arlington County, Virginia, United States
- Nominator: The president with Senate advice and consent
- Term length: No fixed term
- Constituting instrument: 10. U.S.C. § 8016
- Formation: September 1968
- First holder: Randolph S. Driver
- Succession: 18th in SecDef succession by seniority of appointment
- Deputy: Principal Deputy Assistant Secretary (Manpower & Reserve Affairs)
- Salary: Executive Schedule, Level IV
- Website: Official website

The assistant secretary of the navy (manpower and reserve affairs) (abbreviated as ASN M&RA) is a civilian office in the United States Department of the Navy. The assistant secretary of the Navy (manpower and reserve affairs) reports to the under secretary of the Navy who in turn reports to the secretary.

The office of Assistant Secretary of the Navy (Manpower and Reserve Affairs) was created in 1968. The assistant secretary of the Navy (manpower and reserve affairs) is responsible for recruiting all of the personnel of the United States Navy and the United States Marine Corps, including military personnel (both active and reserve), government civilians, contractors, and volunteers. Since 1993, the assistant secretary of the Navy (manpower and reserve affairs) has been assisted by the Department of the Navy Force Management Oversight Council, an advisory council of senior military and civilian personnel in the Department of the Navy.

== Organization of the Office of the Assistant Secretary of the Navy (Manpower and Reserve Affairs) ==
The principal deputies of the assistant secretary of the Navy (manpower and reserve affairs) are:

- Deputy Assistant Secretary of the Navy (Total Force Transformation)
- Deputy Assistant Secretary of the Navy (Military Personnel Policy)
- Deputy Assistant Secretary of the Navy (Reserve Affairs)
- Deputy Assistant Secretary of the Navy (Civilian Human Resources)
- Assistant General Counsel of the Navy (Manpower and Reserve Affairs)

The assistant secretary of the Navy (manpower and reserve affairs) oversees the following organizations:

- Secretary of the Navy Council of Review Boards
  - Physical Evaluation Board
  - Naval Discharge Review Board
  - Naval Clemency and Parole Board
  - Combat Related Special Compensation Board
  - Navy Department Board of Decorations and Medals
- Board of Corrections of Naval Records

The principal military advisors of the assistant secretary of the Navy (manpower and reserve affairs) are:

- Chief of Naval Personnel
  - Chief of Naval Education and Training
- Chief of Navy Reserve
- Surgeon General of the United States Navy
- Deputy Commandant of the United States Marine Corps (Manpower and Reserve Affairs)

== Assistant secretaries ==
Name	Assumed office	Left office	President appointed by	Secretary served under
Randolph S. Driver	September 1968	January 20, 1969	Lyndon B. Johnson	Paul Robert Ignatius
James D. Hittle	March 1969	March 1971	Richard Nixon	John Chafee
James E. Johnson	June 1971	September 1973	Richard Nixon	John Chafee; John Warner
Joseph T. McCullen, Jr.	September 1973	April 1977	Richard Nixon	John Warner; J. William Middendorf
Edward Hidalgo	April 25, 1977	October 24, 1979	Jimmy Carter	W. Graham Claytor, Jr.
Joseph A. Doyle	December 1979	January 1981	Jimmy Carter	Edward Hidalgo
John S. Herrington	October 1981	February 1983	Ronald Reagan	John Lehman
Chapman B. Cox	June 1983	June 1984	Ronald Reagan	John Lehman
Chase Untermeyer	December 1984	April 1988	Ronald Reagan	John Lehman; Jim Webb
Kenneth P. Bergquist	June 1988	November 1989	Ronald Reagan	William L. Ball; Henry L. Garrett III
Barbara S. Pope	November 1989	January 20, 1993	George H. W. Bush	Henry L. Garrett III; Sean O'Keefe
Dorothy M. Meletzke (acting)	January 20, 1993	November 1993	George H. W. Bush	John Howard Dalton
Frederick Pang	November 1993	October 1994	Bill Clinton	John Howard Dalton
Bernard D. Rostker	October 7, 1994	October 1998	Bill Clinton	John Howard Dalton
Carolyn H. Becraft	October 1998	January 20, 2001	Bill Clinton	Richard Danzig
Bonnie Morehouse (acting)	January 20, 2001	July 17, 2001	George W. Bush	Gordon R. England
William A. Navas Jr.	July 17, 2001	January 7, 2008	George W. Bush	Gordon R. England; Donald C. Winter
Anita K. Blair (acting)	January 7, 2008	January 20, 2009	Barack Obama	Donald C. Winter
Harvey C. Barnum Jr. (acting)	January 20, 2009	September 16, 2009	Barack Obama	Donald C. Winter
Juan M. Garcia III	September 16, 2009	January 14, 2016	Barack Obama	Ray Mabus
Franklin R. Parker	January 14, 2016	January 20, 2017	Barack Obama	Ray Mabus
Robert L. Woods (Acting)	April 30, 2017	June 10, 2018	Donald Trump	Richard V. Spencer
Gregory J. Slavonic	June 11, 2018	January 20, 2021	Donald Trump	Richard V. Spencer; Kenneth Braithwaite
Catherine L. Kessmeier (acting)	January 20, 2021	August 13, 2021	Joe Biden	Thomas Harker (acting)
Robert D. Hogue (acting)	August 13, 2021	January 18, 2023	Joe Biden	Carlos Del Toro
Franklin R. Parker	January 18, 2023	January 20, 2025	Joe Biden	Carlos Del Toro
Robert D. Hogue (acting)	January 20, 2025	March 31, 2025	Donald Trump	Terence Emmert (acting); John Phelan
Jennifer A. LaTorre (acting)	March 31, 2025	July 29, 2025	Donald Trump	John Phelan
C. Scott "Sonny" Duncan (acting)	July 29, 2025	December 23, 2025	Donald Trump	John Phelan
Benjamin Kohlmann	December 23, 2025	Incumbent	Donald Trump	John Phelan; Hung Cao (acting)
