= Segs4Vets =

Segs4Vets, CFC #20395
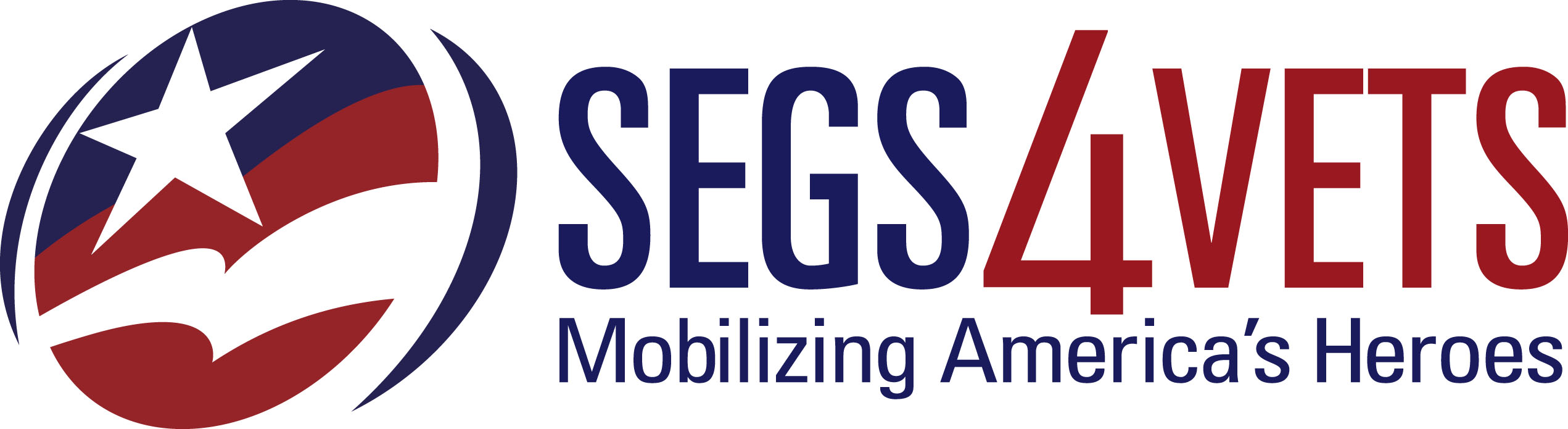
- Formation: 2005
- Type: 501(C)(3) Corporation #55-0877645
- Headquarters: Saint Louis, Missouri
- President / Founder: Jerry Kerr
- Website: http://www.segs4vets.org/

Segs4Vets, a continuing program which began in 2005, is a grass-roots effort sustained and administered by volunteers in the United States that provide Segway PT vehicles to disabled United States military personnel. The program which made its first presentation in September 2005 to three recipients who had sustained injuries in Operation Iraqi Freedom (OIF), was conceived and implemented with the assistance of Gen. Ralph "Ed" Eberhart, USAF (Ret), President of the Armed Forces Benefits Association.

Following its first presentation, the Segs4Vets program began the process of seeking a waiver which would allow the presentation of Segway's to active-duty military personnel who had been severely injured and permanently disabled while serving in support of Operation Iraqi Freedom (OIF) and Operation Enduring Freedom (OEF). In August 2006, the Segs4Vets program became the only recipient of a blanket waiver from the United States military allowing a donation in excess of $1000 to active-duty military personnel.

The Segs4Vets program "provides successful candidates with a universally designed mobility device which aims to draw attention away from their disability. The Segway is a tool that aims to help many of the mobility issues facing our disabled veterans, in a manner which is psychologically uplifting and physically beneficial." Since 2005, the organization has provided over 1200 Segways to wounded veterans.

== Severely Injured Marines and Sailors Initiative (SIMS) ==
In May 2006, Colonel William J. O'Brien, USMC (Ret), the Director of the Department of the Navy's Severely Injured Marines and Sailors Initiative (SIMS), a pilot program enacted under Deputy Assistant Secretary of the Navy H.C. Barney Barnum, to facilitate the full integration of injured service members into the Marine Corps and Navy, or to assist in their transition into the private sector, became aware of the Segs4Vets program. In July 2006, the small staff of the SIMS program, Colonel O'Brien, HMC Christine Jensen, USN, and Joseph Wade began collaborating with the Segs4Vets program to encourage it to serve more OEF & OIF severely injured.

The results of this collaboration resulted in the first major Segs4Vets presentation ceremony on December 7, 2006, during a SIMS luncheon at the Army Navy Country Club in Arlington, Virginia. In May 2007, the SIMS program concluded its work having identified gaps in coverage for the severely injured and recommended solutions for those deficiencies. However, that first Segs4Vets presentation ceremony set a standard for future Segs4Vets ceremonies held twice annually in Washington DC, San Antonio, TX and San Diego, CA. Colonel O'Brien, HMC Jensen, Joe Wade, and now retired Secretary Barnum continue to play an active role in the Segs4Vets program.

== Training Assessment Programs ==
In 2006, the program began setting up training and assessment programs at military medical centers which provided rehabilitative care for OEF and OIF severely injured. These centers include Walter Reed Army Medical Center in February 2006, National Naval Medical Center in May 2006, Brooke Army Medical Center in November 2006 and the Naval Medical Center San Diego in November 2008.

== Notable recipients ==
- Sergeant Kortney Clemons, USA, (Ret)

== Awards and accolades ==
- 2008 Secretary of the Army Public Service Award for distinguished public service in providing outstanding support to our Nation's Veterans
- 2010 Spirit of Hope Award presented by the Office of the Secretary of Defense
- 2016 Congressional Medal of Honor Society's Distinguished Citizen Award presented to Jerry Kerr for embodying the characteristics of the Medal of Honor Society
- Independent Charities of America Seal of Excellence
- Member of the Military Family and Veterans Service Organization of America (M.F.V.S.O.A)
