= Ordre du Mérite combattant =

French ministerial order, awarded from 1953 to 1963

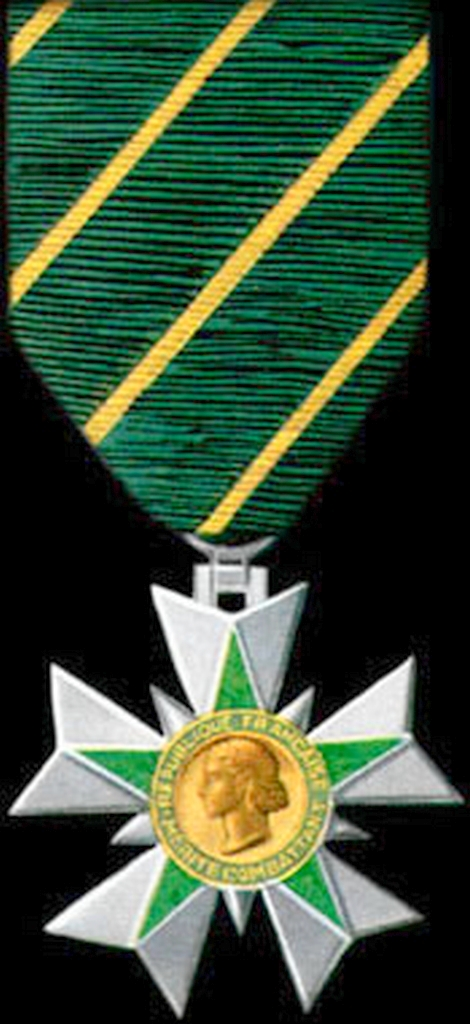
- Knight of the Ordre du Mérite combattant

Awarded by France
- Type: Ministerial Order with three degrees:
- Awarded for: Service to veterans and war victims
- Status: Deprecated 3 December 1963 by the Ordre National du Mérite
- Grades: Commandeur; Officier; Chevalier

The Ordre du Mérite combattant (Order of Merit for Veterans) was a ministerial order of merit of France created on 14 September 1953 to reward individuals who distinguished themselves by their service and dedication in the management of the moral and material interests of veterans and war victims. These individuals' applicable service could be working in the Ministry of Veterans and War Victims or for organizations and associations who work for veterans. The order was administered and awarded the Ministry of Veterans and War Victims.

The Order was deprecated by decree on 3 December 1963, and superseded by the Ordre national du Mérite. Extant members may continue to display and wear their decorations.

== Classes ==
The Order has three classes:

- Chevalier (Knight), up to 150 awarded annually. Recipients must be at least 40 years old and have completed 15 years of qualifying service.
- Officier (Officer), up to 100 awarded annually. To be eligible for promotion to officer, individuals must have already been knights of the order for at least six years.
- Commandeur (Commander), up to 10 awarded annually. To be eligible for promotion to commander, recipients must have been officers of the order for at least four years.

== Appearance ==
The cross of the Ordre du Mérite combattant is a five armed cross. At the center of the cross is a ten-pointed star. The five longest points of the star are enameled in green. The five shorter arms of the star point in between the arms of the cross. In the center of the star is Marianne surrounded by the words RÉPUBLIQUE FRANÇAISE and MÉRITE COMBATTANT. On the reverse of the cross are two clasped hands in front of a sword. Around the edge are the words HONNEUR and DÉVOUEMENT.

The cross for knights is silver and 40 mm (1.6 in) in diameter and worn suspended from the chest. For officers, the cross is the same size but is silver-gilt and the suspension ribbon bears a rosette. For commanders the star is also gilt but 56 mm (2.2 in) in diameter and worn suspended from the neck.

The ribbon of the order is 37 mm (1.5 in) in diameter wide in green with 2 mm (0.079 in) wide diagonal yellow rays spaced 11 mm (0.43 in) apart.

Ribbon bars
Knight	Officer	Commander
