= Naval Discharge Review Board =

The Naval Discharge Review Board is a board established by Congress the United States Department of the Navy before which members of the United States Navy and the United States Marine Corps can challenge the propriety of the terms of their discharge from the military. It is located at the Washington Navy Yard.

10 U.S.C. § 1553 required the Secretaries of all branches of the United States armed forces to "establish a board of review, consisting of five members, to review the discharge or dismissal (other than a discharge or dismissal by sentence of a general court-martial) of any former member of an armed force under the jurisdiction of his department upon its own motion or upon the request of the former member or, if he is dead, his surviving spouse, next of kin, or legal representative." As such, the Naval Discharge Review Board was created by the United States Secretary of the Navy by SECNAVINST 5420.174D.

The purpose of reviews conducted by the board is to determine whether a discharge was granted in the proper manner, and to determine if a given discharge is fair / equitable in light of the regulations that were in effect at the time of the discharge. The board does not have the authority to reinstate a member to service. The Review Board has broad powers to correct any impropriety or inequity even if it only has preponderance of such impropriety or inequity.

The Naval Discharge Review Board does not have the authority to review discharges that occurred more than 15 previously or that were the result of a sentence awarded by a General Court Martial. If more than 15 years from discharge have passed, applicants must apply to the Board for Correction of Naval Records using Form DD-149.

Periodically the Office of Management and Budget's approval on Form DD-293 expires and months will pass before a new one is approved.

The Naval Discharge Review Board is a member of the Secretary of the Navy Council of Review Boards and is overseen by the Assistant Secretary of the Navy (Manpower and Reserve Affairs).
