= Duvall Williams =

American lawyer

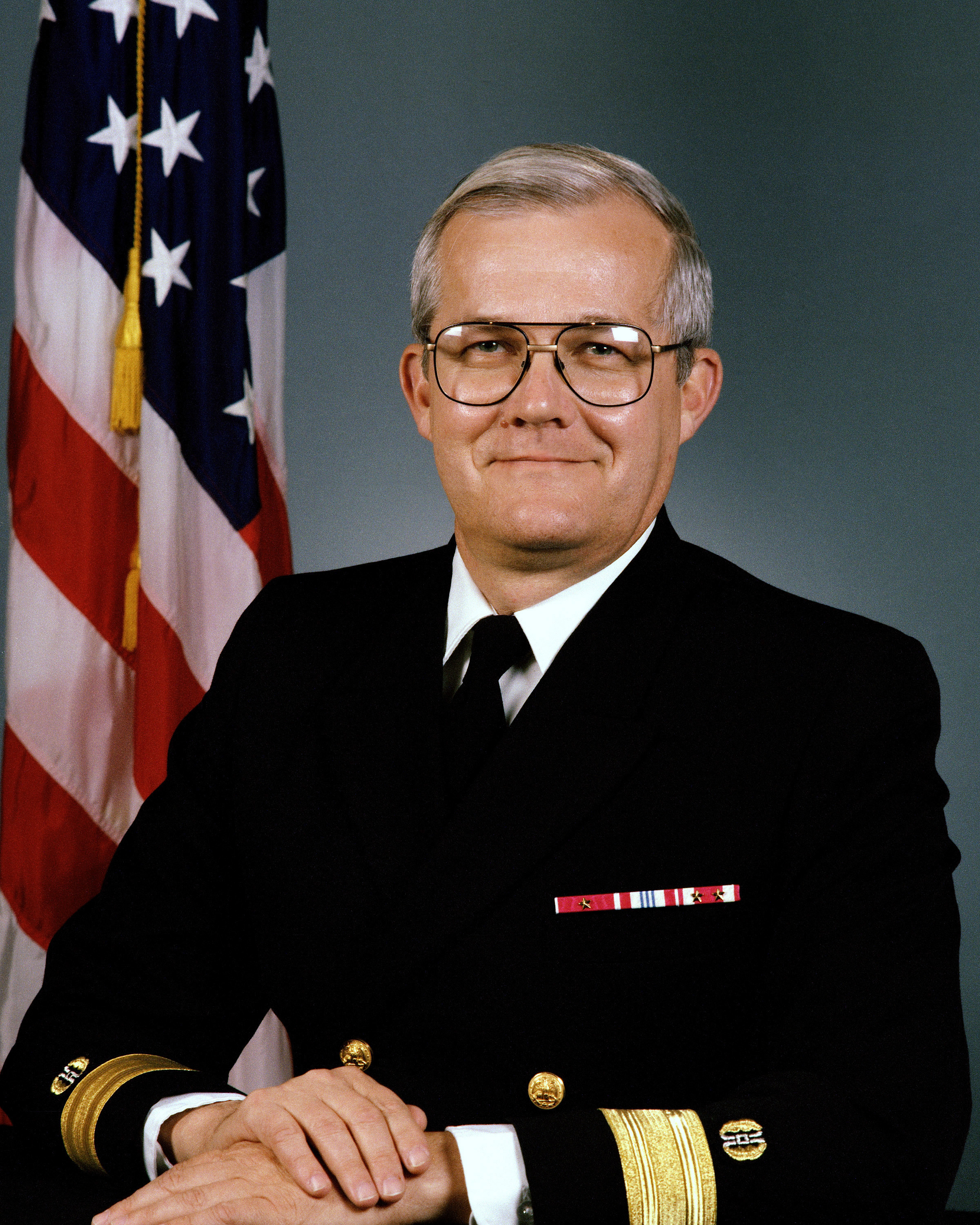
- Born: February 6, 1943 (age 83); Fayetteville, North Carolina, U.S.
- Military career
- Allegiance: United States
- Branch: United States Navy
- Rank: Rear Admiral
- Nickname: "Mac"
- Commands: Naval Investigative Service
- Awards: Legion of Merit (2); Defense Meritorious Service Medal; Meritorious Service Medal (3)

Duvall McClellan "Mac" Williams, Jr. (born 6 February 1943) is a retired rear admiral of the United States Navy who was a commander of the United States Naval Investigative Service. His tenure included the time of the Tailhook scandal; he and Rear Admiral John E. Gordon were tasked with conducting the investigation. After their report was subject to harsh criticism by the Pentagon in 1992, Williams and Gordon resigned.

Born in Fayetteville, North Carolina and raised in Wilmington, North Carolina, Williams earned a B.S. degree in chemistry from Wake Forest University in 1965 and a J.D. degree from the Wake Forest University School of Law in 1968. After law school, he was commissioned as a reserve officer in the Navy Judge Advocate General's Corps. Called to active duty in 1969, he later earned an LL.M. degree from the University of London.
