= Physical Evaluation Board =

In the United States, the Physical Evaluation Board ("PEB") is a board within each military service that

"determine[s] the fitness of Service members with medical conditions to perform their military duties and, for members determined unfit because of duty-related impairments, their eligibility for benefits pursuant to chapter 61 of Reference (c) [10 USC Chapter 61]...Service members may appeal the decision of the PEB. The PEB process includes the informal physical evaluation board, formal physical evaluation board and appellate review of PEB results."

The Physical Evaluation Board is an important part of the Disability Evaluation System and determines whether a member should continue to serve in the US military and, if not, what military disability benefits and compensation the member may be entitled to receive. Military compensation and benefits are different from Department of Veterans Affairs benefits and compensation, though within the framework of the Integrated Disability Evaluation System process the ratings supplied by Veterans Affairs are binding on the military.

== Legal authorities ==
The legal authorities for the Physical Evaluation Boards and Disability Evaluation System processing follow the normal framework of the hierarchy of legal authorities within the United States.

- Statutes passed by the US Congress have primary authority.
- Regulations promulgated by agencies have the next level of authority and, to the extent that they do not conflict with the statutes, are binding.

Within the regulatory regime, the U.S Department of Defense is higher authority over the individual military services, and to the extent that service regulations conflict with Department of Defense regulations, the latter should generally prevail unless Congress has specifically granted the service secretaries authority to decide a specific issue. Of note in reviewing the "law" of Physical Evaluation Boards and the Disability Evaluation System is that the various military service regulations generally lag behind more recent regulatory issuances of the Department of Defense.

Applicants have the right to an MEB, the right to an impartial review of the MEB and to appeal the MEB, the right to a formal Physical Evaluation Board hearing, and the right to appeal the PEB's findings. The result of the Physical Evaluation Board and the Disability Evaluation System process overall may impact the member's total compensation, entitlement to compensation, healthcare benefits (including for eligible dependents), and miscellaneous benefits that any length of service retiree is entitled to receive.

=== Statutory Framework ===
Title 10 United States Code ("U.S.C.") Chapter 61 is the main statutory authority for the Secretaries of the Services Departments to retire or separate members for physical disability.

- 10 U.S.C. § 1201, "Regulars and members on active duty for more than 30 days: retirement."
- 10 U.S.C. § 1202 "Regulars and members on active duty for more than 30 days: temporary disability retired list."
- 10 U.S.C. § 1203 "Regulars and members on active duty for more than 30 days: separation."
- 10 U.S.C. § 1204 "Members on active duty for 30 days or less or on inactive-duty training: retirement."
- 10 U.S.C. § 1205 "Members on active duty for 30 days or less: temporary disability retired list."
- 10 U.S.C. § 1206 "Members on active duty for 30 days or less or on inactive-duty training: separation."
- 10 U.S.C. § 1206a "Reserve component members unable to perform duties when ordered to active duty: disability system processing."
- 10 U.S.C. § 1207 "Disability from intentional misconduct or willful neglect: separation."
- 10 U.S.C. § 1207a "Members with over eight years of active service: eligibility for disability retirement for pre-existing conditions."
- 10 U.S.C. § 1208 "Computation of service."
- 10 U.S.C. § 1209 "Transfer to inactive status list instead of separation."
- 10 U.S.C. § 1210 "Members on temporary disability retired list: periodic physical examination; final determination of status."
- 10 U.S.C. § 1211 "Members on temporary disability retired list: return to active duty; promotion."
- 10 U.S.C. § 1212 "Disability severance pay."
- 10 U.S.C. § 1213 "Effect of separation on benefits and claims."
- 10 U.S.C. § 1214 "Right to full and fair hearing."
- 10 U.S.C. § 1214a "Members determined fit for duty in Physical Evaluation Board: prohibition on involuntary administrative separation or denial of reenlistment due to unsuitability based on medical conditions considered in evaluation."
- 10 U.S.C. § 1215 "Members other than Regulars: applicability of laws."
- 10 U.S.C. § 1216 "Secretaries: powers, functions, and duties."
- 10 U.S.C. § 1216a "Determinations of disability: requirements and limitations on determinations."
- 10 U.S.C. § 1217 "Academy cadets and midshipmen: applicability of chapter."
- 10 U.S.C. § 1218 "Discharge or release from active duty: claims for compensation, pension, or hospitalization."
- 10 U.S.C. § 1218a "Discharge or release from active duty: transition assistance for reserve component members injured while on active duty."
- 10 U.S.C. § 1219 "Statement of origin of disease or injury: limitations."

=== Regulatory Framework ===
The Department of Defense and military service departments have promulgated regulations implementing the laws contained in 10 U.S.C. Chapter 61. The Department of Defense regulations are superior authority to any conflicting military department regulations. Later regulations also generally take precedence over earlier regulations, unless there is specific authority to the contrary.

==== Department of Defense Regulations ====
- Department of Defense Instruction 1332.18.
- Department of Defense Manual 1332.18 Vol. I.
- Department of Defense Manual 1332.18 Vol. II.

===== Department of the Army Regulations =====
- Army Regulation 635–40.
- Army Regulation 40-501.

==== Department of the Navy Regulations ====
- Navy 1850.4E.

==== Department of the Air Force Regulations ====
- Air Force 36–3212.
- Air Force 48–123.

==== Department of Homeland Security/Coast Guard Regulations ====
- COMDINST 1850.2D.
