= John Lehman =

American naval aviator, investor, writer and civil servant (born 1942)

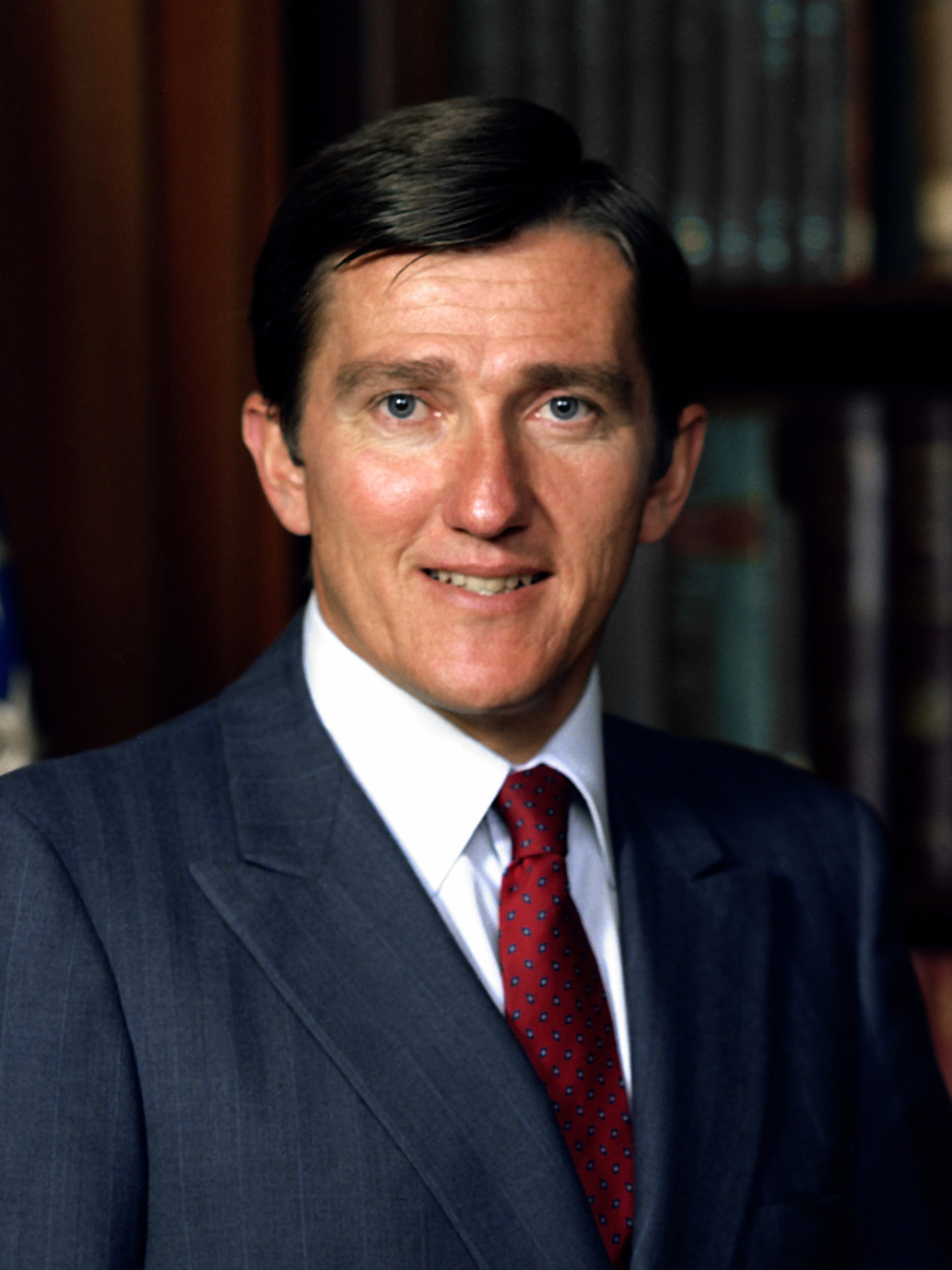
- Lehman in 1982

65th United States Secretary of the Navy
- In office February 5, 1981 – April 10, 1987
- President: Ronald Reagan
- Preceded by: Edward Hidalgo
- Succeeded by: Jim Webb

Personal details
- Born: John Francis Lehman Jr. September 14, 1942 (age 83) Philadelphia, Pennsylvania, U.S.
- Party: Republican
- Education: Saint Joseph's University (BS); Gonville and Caius College, Cambridge (MA); University of Pennsylvania (MA, PhD)
- Website: Official website

John Francis Lehman Jr. (born September 14, 1942) is an American private equity investor and writer who was secretary of the Navy (1981–1987) during the Reagan administration in which he promoted the creation of a 600-ship navy.

Lehman is on the board of trustees for the thinktank Foreign Policy Research Institute (FPRI). Lehman was also, from 2003 to 2004, a member of the National Commission on Terrorist Attacks Upon the United States, commonly called the 9/11 Commission, and signed policy letters produced by the Project for the New American Century. He was also an advisor to Senator John McCain for the 2008 presidential race, and for Senator Mitt Romney in his 2012 bid.

== Early life ==
Lehman was born in Philadelphia, Pennsylvania, the son of Constance (Cruice) and John Francis Lehman, an industrial engineer and decorated US Navy veteran (Lieutenant Commander). He graduated from La Salle College High School and received a B.S. in international relations from Saint Joseph's University in 1964, gained a B.A. from Gonville and Caius College, Cambridge (later elevated to a M.A.), and went on to earn a M.A. and Ph.D. from the University of Pennsylvania.

He is a first cousin once removed of Grace Kelly (Princess Grace of Monaco), and is Chairman of the Princess Grace Foundation-USA, a public charity established after Princess Grace's death to support emerging artists in film, dance, and theater. He led the American delegation to the funeral of Prince Rainier. He and his family live in Bucks County, Pennsylvania, and in Manhattan. He is a long-time Republican.

== Military career ==
Lehman was in the U.S. Air Force Reserve for three years in Cambridge and in 1968 left the Air Force Reserve and joined the United States Naval Reserve as an ensign. He later rose to the rank of commander as a naval flight officer on the A-6 Intruder as a bombardier/navigator. He was on the staff of the National Security Council under Henry Kissinger.

In 1977, Lehman founded the Abington Corporation, a consulting company with clients including defense companies such as Northrop Corporation. He remained its president and director until 1981, when he was appointed by Ronald Reagan to be Secretary of the Navy.

=== Secretary of the Navy (1981–1987) ===
As the 65th secretary, appointed by Reagan in 1981, Lehman launched the idea of building a "600-ship navy". He became Secretary of the Navy at 38, a young age of which he was conscious in his dealing with admirals. He was unique in still being a commander in the Naval Reserve and on active flight status while he was secretary. He developed a strategic concept to counter the threat of Soviet incursion into Western Europe known as the "Lehman Doctrine". The plan called for a military response to any Soviet invasion in Europe by attacking and invading the Soviet Far East along the Pacific, a much less-defended front. Forces would sever the Trans-Siberian Railway and fight westward toward Moscow.

As a naval aviator, Lehman was a massive supporter of aircraft carrier power. His works as a lobbyist and author in the 1970s led him naturally to support a resurgence of US naval aviation under Reagan. His support for the 600-ship navy and promotion of the US Maritime Strategy are hallmarks of that, as are his reactivation of the four Iowa-class battleships. Both the carriers and the battleships were to announce the United States' overcoming of recent Soviet potential superiority by being capable of taking a war to the Soviet Union's doorstep.

According to Hedrick Smith in his book The Power Game, Lehman lost a fight at the Pentagon with the deputy secretary of defense, W. Paul Thayer, over reducing the number of future aircraft carriers planned. Lehman immediately went to the White House, which was unaware of Thayer's decision, and obtained a press release, declaring that Reagan had named two of the ships USS Abraham Lincoln (CVN-72) and USS George Washington (CVN-73), which implied that Reagan had endorsed the 600-ship navy. Lehman was also instrumental in the forced retirement (from retired-retained status) of the Director of Naval Reactors (DNR), Admiral Hyman G. Rickover.

Lehman reportedly engaged in a sexual act with a stripper in front of 50 to 100 spectators in a hospitality suite at the Tailhook Convention in Las Vegas, Nevada in 1986, and had been seen cavorting with strippers at earlier Tailhook conventions. In the Department of Defense Inspector General investigation report on the 1991 Tailhook convention, Lehman is not mentioned by name in reference to the 1986 incident. When asked about the incident on May 26, 1996, by ABC Television journalists Sam Donaldson and Cokie Roberts, Lehman responded, "I have to say that the description is far more lurid than the fact."

Lehman resigned as SECNAV in 1987. He was then promoted to the rank of captain in the US Naval Reserve in 1989 and later retired from the US Navy as a reserve officer in that rank after 30 years of service. On October 13, 2020, the US Navy announced that it was naming the next Arleigh Burke-class destroyer after him. The USS John F. Lehman is under construction.

== Later career ==
Lehman was a former investment banker with UBS AG, Paine Webber, and the president of Abington Corporation. Secretary Lehman is not related to the Lehman Brothers banking family. As of 2020, Lehman is chairman of the private equity investment firm J. F. Lehman and Company, as well as chairman of the Hawaii Superferry. Lehman is chairman of the board of OAO Technology Solutions Inc. He is also an honorary member of the First Troop Philadelphia City Cavalry. As of 2005, he is a member of a number of influential conservative American think tanks, including the Project for the New American Century, The Heritage Foundation, the Foreign Policy Research Institute, the Center for Security Policy and the Committee on the Present Danger.

After his work in the 9/11 Commission in 2002, there was increased speculation that Lehman might be named to a chief security post within the Bush administration. Positions suggested included Director of Central Intelligence, Director of National Intelligence and secretary of defense when Donald Rumsfeld stepped down. During the 2008 presidential election, Lehman was named a possible secretary of defense in the case of a John McCain victory over the winning Democratic nominee, Barack Obama.

He is currently the chairman of the Princess Grace Foundation-USA and is a director of the OpSail Foundation. He is also a member of the board of overseers of the School of Engineering at the University of Pennsylvania, and is a trustee of La Salle College High School. He has been on the board of directors of the Ball Corporation since 1987. Lehman is also an advisory board member for the Partnership for a Secure America, a not-for-profit organization dedicated to recreating the bipartisan center in American national security and foreign policy.

On June 26, 2012, Lehman revealed to the staff of the United States Naval Institute and in a speech given in Portsmouth, United Kingdom, the Reagan administration secretly offered the use of the amphibious assault helicopter carrier Iwo Jima as a replacement in case either of the two British carriers, the Hermes and the Invincible, had been damaged or destroyed during the 1982 Falklands War. That revelation made headlines in the United Kingdom but, except for the US Naval Institute, not in the United States.

== Bibliography ==
=== Books ===
- On Seas of Glory: Heroic Men, Great Ships, and Epic Battles of the American Navy (2002)
  - Winner of the 2003 Samuel Eliot Morison Award for Naval Literature
- Making War: The 200-Year-Old Battle Between the President and Congress Over How America Goes to War (Naval Institute Press, 2001)
- America the Vulnerable: Our Military Problems and How to Fix Them (1992)
- Oceans ventured : winning the Cold War at sea. New York: W. W. Norton. 2018.
- "The Executive, Congress, and Foreign Policy: Studies of the Nixon Administration" (New York: Praeger, 1974).
- Command of the Seas: Building the 600 Ship Navy (Naval Institute Press, 2001)
  - Winner of the 1989 Samuel Eliot Morison Award for Naval Literature

=== Critical studies and reviews of Lehman's work ===
Oceans ventured

- Zakheim, Dov S. (Autumn 2018). "Lehman's maritime triumph". Naval War College Review. 71 (4): 141–146.

Political offices
| Preceded by Edward Hidalgo | United States Secretary of the Navy; 1981–1987 | Succeeded by Jim Webb |
