= Juan M. Garcia III =

American politician (born 1966)

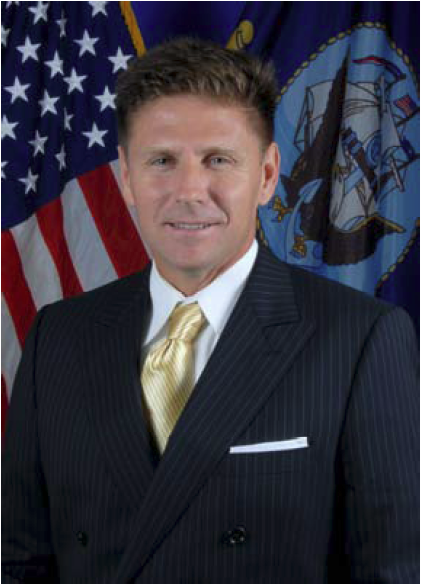

19th Assistant Secretary of the Navy (Manpower and Reserve Affairs)
- In office September 16, 2009 – January 14, 2016
- President: Barack Obama
- Secretary: Ray Mabus
- Preceded by: Harvey C. Barnum Jr.
- Succeeded by: Franklin R. Parker

Texas House of Representatives
- In office 2007 – 2009
- Preceded by: Gene Seaman
- Succeeded by: Todd Ames Hunter
- Constituency: 32nd district

Personal details
- Born: May 27, 1966 (age 60) St. Louis, Missouri
- Party: Democratic
- Spouse: Denise Giraldez
- Education: Harvard University; UC Los Angeles; CSU Fullerton
- Awards: JSCM; Navy Commendation Medal; Navy Achievement Medal

Military service
- Branch/service: United States Navy
- Years of service: 1992–2015
- Rank: Captain
- Unit: Navy Reserve (2005–15)

Juan Manuel Garcia III (born May 27, 1966) was the 17th United States Assistant Secretary of the Navy (Manpower and Reserve Affairs) and a Democratic member of the Texas House of Representatives, representing the 32nd District from 2007 until 2009. He is currently a managing director in the Defense, Security & Justice sector at Deloitte.

== Early years, 1966–1992 ==
Juan M. Garcia III was born on May 27, 1966, in St Louis, Missouri. He graduated from the University of California, Los Angeles in 1988 and then attended the joint J.D. / M.A. program at Harvard Law School and the John F. Kennedy School of Government, graduating in 1992.

== Military service, 1992–2004 ==
Upon graduation, Garcia reported for Aviation Officer Candidate School and was subsequently trained as a United States Naval Aviator at Naval Air Station Corpus Christi in Texas. His first posting was in Patrol Squadron 47, based out of Naval Air Station Barbers Point in Hawaii. He later served missions in the Persian Gulf and the Western Pacific Ocean. During the 1999 NATO bombing of Yugoslavia, he initially served in London as flag aide-de-camp to the Deputy Commander of United States Naval Forces Europe, and then deployed as part of Operation Allied Force. He also served in supporting the enforcement of the no-fly zone in Iraq aboard the USS Constellation (CV-64). His military awards include the Joint Service Commendation Medal, the Navy Commendation Medal, and the Navy Achievement Medal.

Garcia spent 1999 and 2000 as one of sixteen White House Fellows, during which time he served as a Special Assistant to United States Secretary of Education Richard Riley.

Following his year at the White House, Garcia returned to the United States Navy, serving as Officer of the Deck on board the USS Constellation (CV-64). The next year, he returned to the Naval Air Station Corpus Christi as a flight instructor with Training Squadron 27.

== Post-military, 2004–2006 ==
Garcia left active service in 2004, although he retained a position in the United States Navy Reserve as the commanding officer of Reserve Training Squadron 28 at Corpus Christi, Texas. At this time, he joined the Corpus Christi law firm of Hartline, Dacus, Barger, Dreyer, and Kern as an associate attorney.

== Member of the Texas House of Representatives, 2007–2009 ==
In 2006, he ran on the Democratic ticket for the Texas House of Representatives for the 32nd District. Garcia defeated 5-term incumbent Eugene Seaman with just 48% of the total vote. A third candidate, Lenard Nelson, won 6% as a Libertarian. During the campaign, Seaman had mailed out many circulars criticizing Garcia, as did Garcia of Seaman. A scandal involving Seaman and the homestead exemption, though, also became an issue. On the morning after the election, Seaman had led by a narrow 24 votes, as there were three precincts in San Patricio still pending counts. By 9:00 p.m., the hand-counted votes awarded the seat to Garcia.

Garcia was defeated for re-election in 2008 by Republican Todd Ames Hunter, a lawyer from Corpus Christi who previously served in the House from Districts 36 (1989–93) and District 32 (1993–97), each of those eight years as a Democrat. The final tally was 50.13% for Hunter, 46.79% for Garcia, and 3.06% for returning Libertarian candidate Leonard Nelson. Garcia conceded on election night.

== Assistant Secretary of the Navy (Manpower and Reserve Affairs), 2009–2015 ==
In 2009, Garcia was nominated as Assistant Secretary of the Navy (Manpower and Reserve Affairs) by President of the United States Barack Obama. Garcia was confirmed by the Senate Armed Services Committee on August 5, 2009. His nomination proceeded to the full Senate, where he was confirmed on September 16, 2009.

== Business career ==
In 2015, Garcia joined Amazon as its Global Leader for Career Advancement. In 2018, Garcia joined Deloitte as a managing director in the Defense, Security and Justice sector and is now Deloitte’s Veteran/Military-Affiliated Leader.

Government offices
Preceded by William A. Navas, Jr. Anita K. Blair (acting); Harvey C. Barnum, Jr. (acting)	Assistant Secretary of the Navy (Manpower and Reserve Affairs); September 16, 2009 – January 14, 2016	Succeeded by Franklin R. Parker
