= Smith Richardson Foundation =

Policy research foundation

Smith Richardson Foundation, Inc.
- Founded: 1935; 91 years ago
- Founder: H. Smith and Grace Jones Richardson
- Purpose: Support research in U.S. foreign and domestic public policy
- Location: Westport, Connecticut, U.S.
- Endowment: $521 million USD (2013)
- Website: www.srf.org

The Smith Richardson Foundation is a private foundation based in Westport, Connecticut that supports policy research in the realms of foreign and domestic public policy.

According to the foundation's website, its mission is "to contribute to important public debates and to address serious public policy challenges facing the United States. The Foundation seeks to help ensure the vitality of our social, economic, and governmental institutions. It also seeks to assist with the development of effective policies to compete internationally and to advance U.S. interests and values abroad."

The foundation is made up of three grant making programs:

- International Security and Foreign Policy Program
- Domestic Public Policy Program
- Strategy & Policy Fellows Program

The foundation holds annual grant competitions for each of its programs where it awards three $60,000 research grants per program.

== History ==
The Smith Richardson Foundation was established in 1935 by H. Smith Richardson Sr. and his wife Grace Jones Richardson. Richardson transformed the Vicks Chemical Company, a firm created by his father, Lunsford Richardson, into one of the leading over-the-counter drug companies in the world. In later years, Richardson-Vicks also became a major force in the market for prescription drugs as well as a wide range of consumer products. In 1985, the Richardson family sold the company to Procter & Gamble.

In 1973, R. Randolph Richardson assumed the presidency of the Foundation. Richardson was particularly interested in supporting free-market and pro-democratic causes. During his tenure as president, the Foundation played an important role in supporting think tanks and scholars who were active in public policy debates over issues such as defense policy, tax policy, education reform, and regulation. The Foundation also supported pro-democracy organizations in Central and Eastern Europe, the Soviet Union, and Central and South America.

In 1992, Peter L. Richardson, a nephew of R. Randolph Richardson, assumed the presidency of the Foundation, while Heather Higgins, the daughter of R. Randolph Richardson, became president of the Randolph Foundation. In June 2015, R. Randolph Richardson passed away.

== Assets and grant making ==
At the end of 2013, the foundation had assets totaling $521,570,780 according to its federal tax return. During that year, it awarded a total of 411 grants totaling $20,695,903.

According to the SRF 2020 Annual Report, as of 31 December 2020, SRF had total assets of US $839,148,711.

SRF has awarded grants to major think tanks and university research centers. Some of the foundation's major grantees include the following:

- American Enterprise Institute
- Brookings Institution
- Caucasus Institute
- The Investigative Project on Terrorism
- Center for European Policy Analysis
- Center for Strategic and Budgetary Assessments
- Center for Strategic and International Studies
- Council on Foreign Relations
- Center on Irregular Warfare and Armed Groups
- Freedom House
- Hudson Institute
- National Institute for Public Policy
- Nonproliferation Policy Education Center
- Paul H. Nitze School of Advanced International Studies (SAIS) at Johns Hopkins
- Pepperdine University
- RAND Corporation
- Urban Institute
- Woodrow Wilson International Center for Scholars

== Trustees and officers ==
Trustees

- Peter L. Richardson, Chairman of the Board
- Marin J. Strmecki, President
- Ross F. Hemphill, V.P. and C.F.O.
- Arvid R. Nelson *, Secy. and Gov.
- Michael Blair
- W. Winburne King, III, Vice Chair
- E. William Stetson III
- John Richardson
- Nico Richardson
- Tyler B. Richardson
