= Ricky Silberman =

American activist

Rosalie "Ricky" Silberman (née Gaull; March 31, 1937 – February 18, 2007) was an American conservative activist who, with Barbara Olson and others, co-founded the Independent Women's Forum.

== Biography ==
Born as Rosalie Gaull in Jackson, Michigan, she graduated with honors in government from Smith College in 1958. She met her husband-to-be, future federal Judge Laurence H. Silberman, in 1955 during summer school at Harvard University.

== Career ==
Silberman raised three children while the family lived in Hawaii during the 1960s, but she also worked as a teacher in suburban Washington before getting involved in politics and public affairs. President Richard Nixon appointed her to the Presidential Commission for the Education of Disadvantaged Children, and she worked as a press secretary for U.S. Sen. Robert Packwood (R-Oregon).

When the Silbermans moved to San Francisco in 1979, she did development work for the San Francisco Conservatory. In 1984, President Ronald Reagan appointed her to the Equal Employment Opportunity Commission (EEOC), where she served until 1995, rising to the positions of vice-chair and commissioner.

Her support of Supreme Court nominee Clarence Thomas led to the formation of the Independent Women's Forum (IWF), which had its origins in 1991–92, when Mrs. Silberman, along with Barbara Olson and Anita K. Blair, among others, started an informal network of women who supported the Thomas nomination despite allegations of sexual harassment by Anita Hill, a former colleague at the Equal Employment Opportunity Commission.

She had worked with Thomas at the commission and was a close friend. During his contentious confirmation, she spoke out on his behalf and helped edit The Real Anita Hill, a book by David Brock that savaged Hill and portrayed her charges as a political dirty trick. From 1995–2000, she was executive director of the Office of Congressional Compliance, an independent authority established by Congress to oversee the new law requiring that Congress abide by many of the same workplace regulations that covered the rest of the nation. In 2002, Donald Rumsfeld appointed her to the Defense Department Advisory Commission on the Status of Women (DACOWITS), where she served as Boardmember, and, later, Chairperson Emeritus until her death five years later.

== Death ==
Silberman died from complications from breast cancer on Sunday, February 18, 2007 at Georgetown University Hospital, Washington, D.C., at the age of 69. She was survived by her husband of 49 years; three children and, at the time of her death, eight grandchildren.
