= Jane Watson =

Jane Watson may refer to:

- Jane Watson (netball) (born 1990), New Zealand netball international
- Jane Watson Stetson, American political professional
- Jane Werner Watson (1915–2004), American children's author
