= Anita K. Blair =

American government official

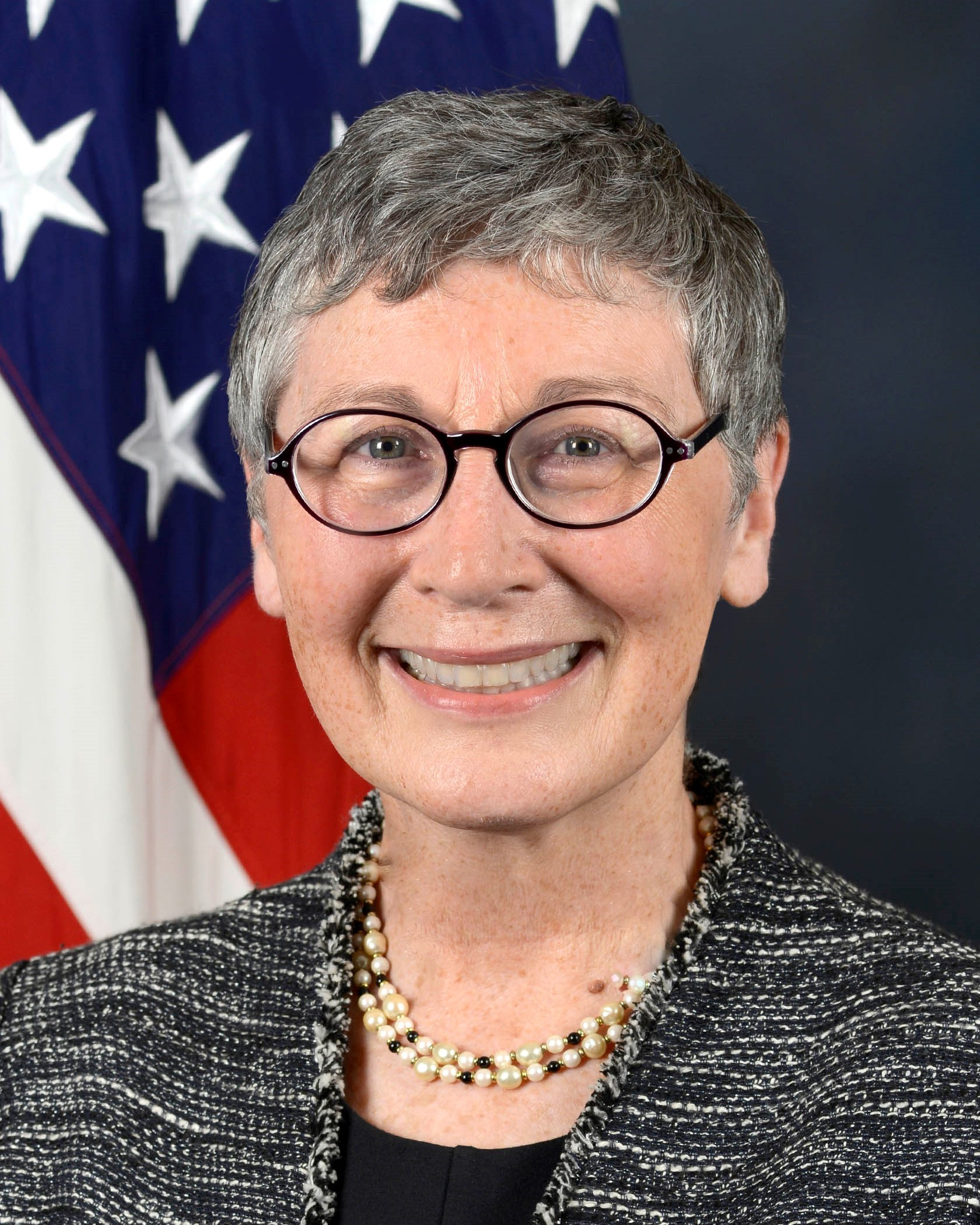

Deputy Assistant Secretary of Defense for Civilian Personnel Policy
- In office June 2017 – December 2020
- President: Donald Trump
- Leader: James Mattis

Assistant Secretary of the Navy (Manpower and Reserve Affairs)
- In office January 2008 – January 2009
- President: George W. Bush
- Preceded by: William A. Navas Jr.
- Succeeded by: Juan M. Garcia III

Personal details
- Born: Anita Katherine Blair; November 15, 1950 (age 76) Washington, D.C., U.S
- Spouse: C. Douglas Welty
- Education: University of Virginia School of Law; University of Michigan

Anita Katherine Blair (born November 15, 1950) was one of the co-founders of the Independent Women's Forum (and at one time its president) and served as United States Deputy Assistant Secretary of the Navy (Total Force Transformation and Military Personnel Policy) from 2001 to 2006 and as acting Assistant Secretary of the Navy (Manpower and Reserve Affairs) in 2008.

== Biography ==
Blair was educated at Catholic schools; the University of Michigan (B.A. in Classical Greek, 1971); and the University of Virginia School of Law (J.D., 1981).

In 1981, Blair established a law practice in Washington, D. C., focused on commercial law and litigation.

In 1991, amid the Clarence Thomas Supreme Court nomination controversy, Blair joined an ad hoc group called "Women for Judge Thomas." Blair and two other women involved in this organization, Rosalie (Ricky) Gaull Silberman and Barbara Olson, subsequently co-founded the Independent Women's Forum (IWF) in 1992, serving as the organization's first General Counsel and as executive vice-president. She later served as the organization's president. The IWF advocates equity feminism, as opposed to gender feminism (i.e. supporting gender roles, though opposing patriarchy). The IWF's slogan is "All Issues are Women's Issues," and the group speaks out on all manner of political issues, usually from the perspective of Conservatism in the United States. The IWF's mission statement says its goal is to build "greater respect for limited government, equality under the law, property rights, free markets, strong families, and a powerful and effective national defense and foreign policy." Blair also maintained an active law practice throughout the 1990s and was active in the Virginia State Bar, serving on the Board of Governors of the Virginia State Bar Section on Antitrust, Franchise and Trade Regulation Law, which she chaired in 1998–1999.

Blair authored amicus briefs in several high-profile United States constitutional law cases before the Supreme Court of the United States, most notably United States v. Virginia. In U.S. v. Virginia, the IWF argued in favor of a plaintiff who challenged the male-only policy of the Virginia Military Institute. Blair was at the time a member of the Board of Visitors of the Virginia Military Institute, having been appointed by Governor of Virginia George Allen. In the wake of U.S. v. Virginia, the Virginia Military Institute appointed Blair to chair its Assimilation Review Task Force to oversee the admission of women to VMI. Governor Jim Gilmore re-appointed Blair to the Board of Visitors in 1999.

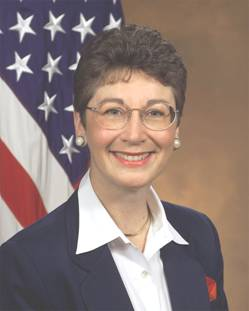
Anita K. Blair, ca. 2001.

In 1998, Blair was appointed to the Congressional Commission on Military Training and Gender-Related Issues, a commission focusing on the issue of women in the military, and looking at topics such as rules on adultery, fraternization and sexual conduct in the military, as well as the effectiveness of military basic training.

In 2001, President of the United States George W. Bush appointed Blair as Deputy Assistant Secretary of the Navy (Military Personnel Policy); she was sworn in on August 15, 2001, and held that office until July 2006. As Deputy Assistant Secretary of the Navy (Military Personnel Policy), Blair oversaw the United States Navy's recruiting and retention; training and education; active duty strength and compensation; character, leadership development, and equal opportunity; health affairs; counter drug programs; family support; and morale, welfare, and recreation.

In February 2005, Blair became Deputy Assistant Secretary of the Navy (Total Force Transformation), giving her responsibility for the United States Department of the Navy's human capital transformation agenda and modernization of the management of the Department's total force of active duty, reserve, civilian and contractor personnel.

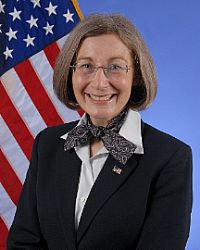
Assist. Secretary of the Navy portrait

On September 18, 2007, President of the United States George W. Bush nominated Blair as Assistant Secretary of the Navy (Manpower and Reserve Affairs). Blair was never confirmed by the United States Senate, but on January 8, 2008, she assumed the duties of acting Assistant Secretary of the Navy (Manpower and Reserve Affairs), while retaining her post as Deputy Assistant Secretary of the Navy (Total Force Transformation). Harvey C. Barnum, Jr. replaced Blair as acting Assistant Secretary of the Navy (Manpower and Reserve Affairs) in January 2009.

Blair is a Fellow of the National Academy of Public Administration (United States).

Government offices
Preceded by William A. Navas, Jr.	Assistant Secretary of the Navy (Manpower and Reserve Affairs) (acting); January 8, 2008 – January 2009	Succeeded by Harvey C. Barnum, Jr. (acting); Juan M. Garcia III
