= Laurence Silberman =

American judge (1935–2022)

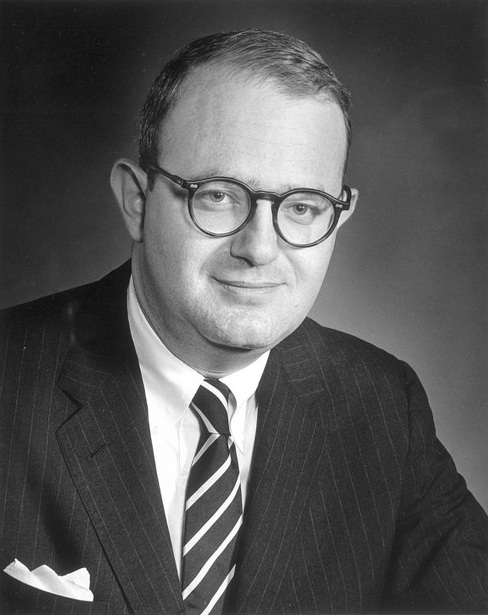
- Official portrait, c. 1969–1970

Chair of the Iraq Intelligence Commission
- In office February 6, 2004 – March 31, 2005 Serving with Chuck Robb
- President: George W. Bush
- Preceded by: Position established
- Succeeded by: Position abolished

Judge of the United States Foreign Intelligence Surveillance Court of Review
- In office June 18, 1996 – May 18, 2003
- Nominated by: William Rehnquist
- Preceded by: Robert W. Warren
- Succeeded by: Ralph K. Winter Jr.

Senior Judge of the United States Court of Appeals for the District of Columbia Circuit
- In office November 1, 2000 – October 2, 2022

Judge of the United States Court of Appeals for the District of Columbia Circuit
- In office October 28, 1985 – November 1, 2000
- Nominated by: Ronald Reagan
- Preceded by: Seat established by 98 Stat. 333
- Succeeded by: Brett Kavanaugh

United States Ambassador to Yugoslavia
- In office May 8, 1975 – December 26, 1976
- President: Gerald Ford
- Preceded by: Malcolm Toon
- Succeeded by: Lawrence Eagleburger

14th United States Deputy Attorney General
- In office January 20, 1974 – April 6, 1975
- President: Richard Nixon; Gerald Ford
- Preceded by: William Ruckelshaus
- Succeeded by: Harold R. Tyler Jr.

United States Under Secretary of Labor
- In office 1970–1973
- President: Richard Nixon
- Preceded by: James Day Hodgson
- Succeeded by: Richard F. Schubert

United States Solicitor of Labor
- In office 1969–1970
- President: Richard Nixon
- Preceded by: Charles Donahue
- Succeeded by: Peter Nash

Personal details
- Born: Laurence Hirsch Silberman; October 12, 1935 York, Pennsylvania, U.S.
- Died: October 2, 2022 (aged 86) Washington, D.C., U.S.
- Party: Republican
- Spouses: Ricky Gaull (died 2007); Patricia Winn (m. 2008)
- Children: 3, including Robert
- Education: Dartmouth College (BA); Harvard University (LLB)
- Awards: Presidential Medal of Freedom (2008)

Laurence Hirsch Silberman (October 12, 1935 – October 2, 2022) was an American jurist and diplomat who served as a United States circuit judge of the United States Court of Appeals for the District of Columbia Circuit from 1985 until his death. He was appointed in October 1985 by President Ronald Reagan and took senior status on November 1, 2000. On June 11, 2008, President George W. Bush awarded Silberman the Presidential Medal of Freedom.

== Early life and education ==
Silberman was born in 1935 to a Jewish family in York, Pennsylvania. He graduated from Dartmouth College with a Bachelor of Arts in history in 1957. After serving six months of active duty in the US Army (five-and-a-half years in reserve), he attended Harvard Law School and graduated in 1961 with a Bachelor of Laws degree.

== Career ==
Silberman worked as a partner at the law firms Moore, Silberman & Schulze in Honolulu and Morrison & Foerster and Steptoe & Johnson in Washington, D.C. He also served as Executive Vice President of Crocker National Bank in San Francisco. He also worked as an attorney in the National Labor Relations Board's appellate section, as Solicitor of Labor from 1969 to 1970, and as Undersecretary of Labor from 1970 to 1973. As Solicitor, he was largely responsible for developing the requirement of goals and timetables as an enforcement device for the affirmative action order. He subsequently regretted his stance and wrote, "Our use of numerical standards in pursuit of equal opportunity has led to the very quotas guaranteeing equal results that we initially wished to avoid."

He also led the development of legislation to implement "final offer selection" as a means of resolving labor disputes. As Undersecretary, he repeatedly clashed with Charles "Chuck" Colson and tendered his resignation to compel the hiring of a black regional director in New York in 1972.

President Richard Nixon nominated Silberman to be Deputy Attorney General of the United States in January 1974. Silberman was tasked with reviewing J. Edgar Hoover's secret files, which he described as "the single worst experience of my long governmental service." Silberman stated that "this country – and the Federal Bureau of Investigation – would be well served if [Hoover's] name were removed from the bureau's building. It is as if the Defense Department were named for Aaron Burr. Liberals and conservatives should unite to support legislation to accomplish this repudiation of a very sad chapter in American history." Silberman also served briefly as Acting Attorney General during the Watergate crisis. Silberman's resignation was accepted by President Gerald Ford, pending the confirmation of his successor.

Ford nominated Silberman as ambassador to Yugoslavia in April 1975. He served in the role until he resigned during the presidential transition of Jimmy Carter. At the same time, Silberman also served as the Presidential Special Envoy for International Labor Organization Affairs. As ambassador, he succeeded in freeing an American who had been falsely imprisoned by the regime as a CIA agent, by putting pressure on both the Yugoslav regime and the State Department. During the campaign for the 1980 presidential election, he was co-chairman of Ronald Reagan's foreign policy advisors. From 1981 to 1985, he served as a member of the General Advisory Committee on Arms Control and Disarmament and the Defense Policy Board.

In total, Silberman held six Senate-confirmed positions and never received a dissenting vote.

=== Federal judicial service ===
Silberman was nominated by President Ronald Reagan on September 11, 1985, to the United States Court of Appeals for the District of Columbia Circuit, to a new seat created by 98 Stat. 333. He was confirmed by the United States Senate on October 25, 1985, and received commission on October 28, 1985. He assumed senior status on November 1, 2000.

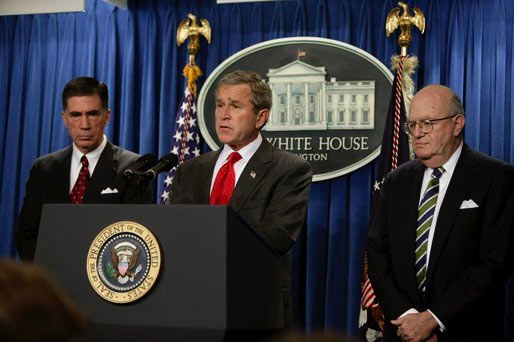
Silberman (right) with President George W. Bush and Chuck Robb announcing the formation of the Iraq Intelligence Commission in 2004

Silberman was on the short list of potential nominees to the U.S. Supreme Court on three separate occasions in 1987, 1990, and 1991. However, after the rejection of Robert Bork with whom Silberman had served on the District of Columbia Circuit, he was regarded as controversial. Unlike fellow conservatives Pasco Bowman II and John Clifford Wallace, Silberman even drew some opposition from Republican senators because although he was a judicial conservative and thus was likely against Roe v. Wade as a legal matter, he was thought to be personally pro-choice. Meanwhile, some criticized him for having an explosive temper while he was Deputy Attorney General, and at the same time, others noted that "he expect[ed] people to pound the table and shout right back" and uniquely possessed "the interest, talent and capacity for administration." It was also reported Silberman faced criticism over legal issues arising from his time at Crocker National Bank at which he had been executive vice-president between 1979 and 1983, but that appears to have been pretextual given the FBI had cleared him of any wrongdoing and he had since been confirmed to the D.C. Circuit unanimously. He was a member of the United States Foreign Intelligence Surveillance Court of Review at the time of its first ever session in 2002.

On February 6, 2004, Silberman was appointed co-chairman of the Iraq Intelligence Commission, an independent blue-ribbon panel created to investigate U.S. intelligence surrounding the United States' 2003 invasion of Iraq and Iraq's weapons of mass destruction. In the wake of the resignation of Alberto Gonzales as United States Attorney General in 2007, Silberman was mentioned as a possible successor.

In 2008, Silberman, joined by five other senior judges, initiated a suit against the United States, "claiming that when Congress refused to authorize statutory cost-of-living raises for federal judges, it violated the Compensation Clause [of the Constitution]". The Federal Judges Association opposed bringing the suit. The suit was ultimately successful, leading to a nationwide rise in pay for all federal judges as of January 1, 2014.

In 2015, Silberman wrote an op-ed in the Wall Street Journal, writing that the charge that "President Bush deceived the American people about the threat from Saddam" reminded him of "a similarly baseless accusation that helped the Nazis come to power in Germany."

In June 2020, Silberman circulated an email criticizing an amendment by Senator Elizabeth Warren to rename Confederate military bases. He characterized the effort as "madness" and "the desecration of Confederate graves". An African American law clerk replied, pointing out the Confederate legacy of slavery and Silberman’s inconsistency, given his prior advocacy to rename FBI headquarters. The amendment was ultimately included in the final version of the NDAA 2021

In October 2021, Silberman won the first annual Justice Clarence Thomas First Principles Award, awarded by the Wall Street Journal, for his judicial service. The Wall Street Journal editorial board called him "one of the all-time giants of the federal bench" and perhaps "the most influential judge never to have sat on the Supreme Court."

=== Yale Law School protest ===
On March 17, 2022, several news outlets published an email that Silberman had sent to all Article III federal judges regarding a protest at Yale Law School. In the email, Silberman suggested that students who disrupted a Federalist Society event by shouting down a speaker should be barred from consideration for potential clerkships because they did not respect First Amendment free speech principles. The panel discussion, which focused on remedies for First Amendment violations, featured Monica Miller, the legal director of the American Humanist Association, and Kristen Waggoner, general counsel for Alliance Defending Freedom. Silberman's characterization of the event was criticized by some and praised by others.

=== Legal opinions ===
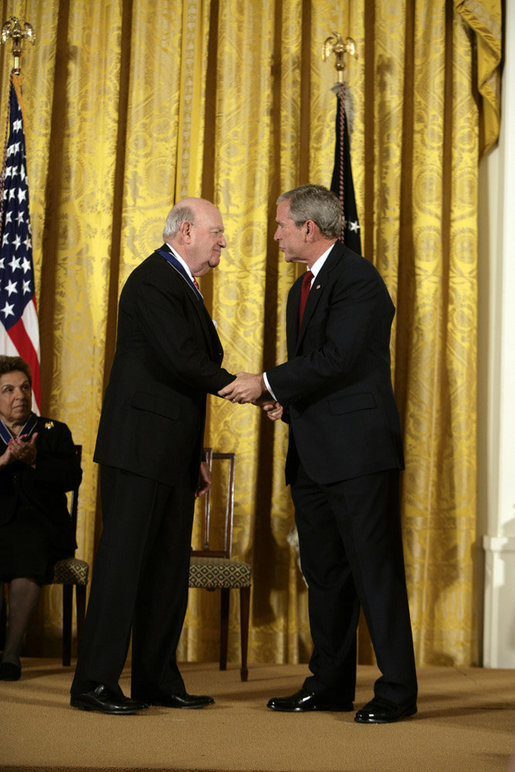
Silberman and President George W. Bush in 2008

As a judge, Silberman authored a number of noteworthy opinions:

- In In re Sealed Case, 838 F.2d 476 (1988), Silberman held that the procedures for appointing independent counsels violated the Appointments Clause of the U.S. Constitution and the separation of powers, because they interfered with the President's ability to ensure that the laws are "faithfully executed". This decision was subsequently reversed by the Supreme Court in Morrison v. Olson, 487 U.S. 654 (1988), over a vigorous dissent by Justice Antonin Scalia.
- In a later per curiam decision captioned In re: Sealed Case No. 02-001, 310 F.3d 717 (2002), the court upheld a provision of the Patriot Act that made it easier for law enforcement officers and intelligence officers to share information with each other. This was an important decision involving interpretation of the Patriot Act, the use of foreign intelligence, and the role of the FISA Court. Silberman subsequently disclosed that he had in fact written the opinion.
- In Parker v. District of Columbia, 478 F.3d 370 (2007), Silberman held that the District of Columbia's flat ban on the registration and carrying of firearms violated the Second Amendment right "to keep and bear arms". The case was subsequently upheld by the Supreme Court in District of Columbia v. Heller, 554 U.S. 570 (2008).
- In Seven-Sky v. Holder, 661 F.3d 1 (2011), Silberman authored an opinion upholding the Affordable Care Act as a constitutional exercise of the Commerce Power, on the grounds that individuals' decisions to remain uninsured, in the aggregate, have a substantial effect on interstate commerce. At the time, a number of commentators viewed Judge Silberman's opinion as an important bellwether of how the Supreme Court might decide the case. The Supreme Court ultimately rejected Judge Silberman's reasoning in National Federation of Independent Business v. Sebelius, 132 S. Ct. 2566 (2012), by a vote of 5 to 4, upholding the Affordable Care Act instead as an exercise of the taxing power. Some commentators praised Silberman, a Reagan appointee, for his "judicial restraint" in upholding the signature statute of a Democratic administration. Writing in Slate, Simon Lazarus described Silberman as a "conservative icon" and noted that "despite intense short-term political pressures and long-term ideological stakes, leading conservative jurists appear likely to stick to their traditional judicial restraint canon when deciding the fate of the Affordable Care Act".
- Dissenting vigorously in Tah v. Global Witness Publishing, Inc. Silberman called on the Supreme Court to overturn New York Times v. Sullivan, and claimed that The New York Times and The Washington Post are "virtually Democratic Party broadsheets," and labeled "[n]early all television—network and cable—a Democratic Party trumpet." His dissent also accused big tech companies of censoring conservatives and warned that "Democratic Party ideological control" of the media may be a prelude to an "authoritarian or dictatorial regime" that constitutes "a threat to a viable democracy".

=== Academic career ===
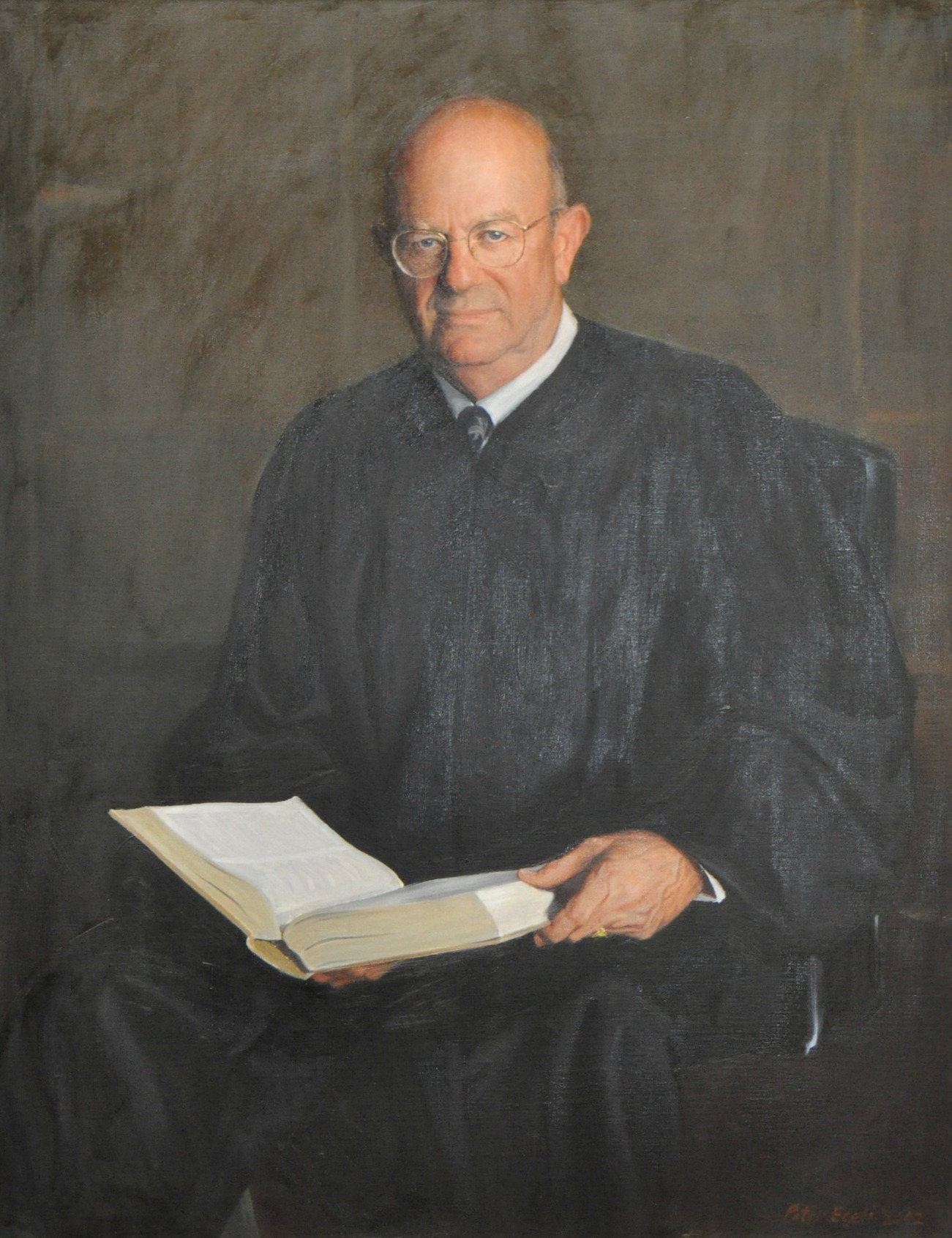
Silberman's official artistic portrait while a judge

Silberman was a lecturer at the University of Hawaiʻi from 1962 to 1963. He was an adjunct professor of Administrative Law at Georgetown University Law Center from 1987 to 1994 and from 1997 to 1999, at NYU from 1995 to 1996, and at Harvard in 1998. He held the position of Distinguished Visitor from the Judiciary at Georgetown University Law Center from 2000 to 2019 and taught both administrative law and labor law. Silberman received the Charles Fahy Distinguished Adjunct Professor Award for the 2002–2003 academic year. He has also received a Lifetime Service Award (2006) and a Distinguished Service Award (2007) from the Federalist Society chapters of Georgetown and Harvard, respectively.

== Criticism ==
=== "October Surprise" ===
Some commentators have speculated that Silberman may have been involved in the so-called "October Surprise" with respect to the Iran hostage crisis prior to the 1980 presidential election, alleging that Silberman and others had attended meetings to negotiate the delayed release of the hostages by the Iranian government.

Silberman publicly responded as follows to the allegations:

In the early fall of 1980 when I was Co-Chairman of Governor Reagan's foreign policy advisors and then a San Francisco banker, I came back to Washington for a meeting of Governor Reagan's advisors. Dick Allen, who subsequently became President Reagan's National Security Advisor, was playing a similar role in the campaign. As our session ended (I recall it dealt with Arab-Israeli issues), Dick asked me if I could accompany him to a meeting at the L'Enfant Hotel. He explained that Bud McFarlane, then working for Senator Tower, wished him to see someone who had information on the hostage crisis—which, of course, was a matter of great political consequence to both campaigns. He asked me to join him, as an ex-Deputy Attorney General, because he was a bit apprehensive. At about noon McFarlane walked into the lobby with a gentleman whom I remembered as a Moroccan. But, as Dick Allen's contemporaneously-written memorandum had it, the man was a Malaysian named Mohammed (at least I got the "M" right). He was a fervent supporter of the Shah and an adversary of the Iranian revolution, but he was definitely not an Iranian, still less a representative of the Iranian government [the contrary of which assertion being the essence of the allegations of inappropriate contact with the Iranian government]. He was also hostile to the Carter Administration for having abandoned the Shah. It was his plan to contact someone with influence in Iran to propose that the hostages be released before the election to Governor Reagan, thereby embarrassing President Carter. I was shocked and responded spontaneously that we Americans have only one President at a time, and although Dick asked him for any actual information he might have on the hostages—which he did not have—we left after only a few minutes. I advised Dick to write a memo of the meeting, which he did. Unfortunately the memo, subsequently authenticated by the FBI, was mislaid for years. Ironically, it was I who unwittingly initiated the so-called "October Surprise" story, which grew into an utterly fantastic tale, even including George H. W. Bush's alleged secret trips to Paris to meet with Iranian emissaries. Bill Safire heard something of the L'Enfant Plaza meeting when he was doing a rather critical story on McFarlane, who had been Reagan's National Security Advisor. He called me (I was by then on the bench), and I told him what occurred. He made brief mention of it in a column raising, perhaps, unfair questions about McFarlane's judgment—it may well be that McFarlane was acting for Senator Tower.

On January 3, 1993, the bipartisan Joint Report of the Task Force to Investigate Certain Allegations Concerning the Holding of American Hostages by Iran in 1980, also known as the "October Surprise Task Force," was released. The Task Force, led by Rep. Lee H. Hamilton (D) and Rep. Henry J. Hyde (R), specifically concluded that "there is wholly insufficient evidence of any communications by or on behalf of the 1980 Reagan Presidential campaign with any persons representing or connected with the Iranian government or with those holding Americans as hostages during the 1979-1981 period" and that "there is no credible evidence supporting any attempt or proposal to attempt, by the Reagan Presidential Campaign – or persons representing or associated with the campaign – to delay the release of the American hostages in Iran."

=== Iran–Contra affair ===
Silberman served on a panel of the D.C. Circuit in U.S. vs. Oliver L. North, 910 F.2d 843 (1990), in which a per curiam opinion was issued that overturned the conviction of Oliver North, who had been a key figure in perpetrating the Iran–Contra affair.

In his memoir, Firewall, published seven years after the case in 1997, Lawrence Walsh, the Independent Counsel appointed by President Reagan to investigate the Iran Contra Affair, he mused that in retrospect, he wished that he had moved for Silberman's recusal from the panel:

Yet I was reluctant to request that Silberman disqualify himself. Prior government service or political activity did not bar him from serving on the panel. His unfavorable view of independent counsel, if it arose in the course of litigation rather than outside the courtroom, was not a basis for disqualification. Too late, I learned that he had a personal animus: He despised Judge Gerhard Gesell [who presided over the North case in the lower court]. Indeed, Silberman had stopped having lunch in the judges' lunchroom because of his antipathy for Gesell. Had I known that, the scales certainly would have tipped in favor of my seeking his recusal.

Silberman also observed that David Brock, latterly a Silberman critic, published a refutation of Lawrence Walsh's characterization of Judge Silberman's involvement in the North case:

I am still gratified, however, by Brock's review of Lawrence Walsh's book, which he has never (or at least, not yet) repudiated. In that review, Brock, by interviewing federal judges, demolished Walsh's bizarre and unique claim that I should have recused myself from sitting on the North case because of my supposed hostility to the federal district judge who decided the case. As Brock established, that assertion—which no one ever heard of as a ground for recusal—was untrue.

== Personal life and death ==
Silberman's first wife, Rosalie "Ricky" Gaull Silberman, co-founder of the Independent Women's Forum, died on February 17, 2007. Together, they had three children, Robert S. Silberman, Kate Fischer, and Anne Otis. His eight grandchildren include the screenwriter and film producer Katie Silberman. Silberman married Patricia Winn Silberman in 2008.

Silberman was a close friend of Supreme Court Justice Antonin Scalia, since he had recruited Scalia into the Ford administration. Silberman was also a friend of Justice Clarence Thomas, and in 1989 encouraged a young and reluctant Thomas to accept a federal judgeship on the United States Court of Appeals for the District of Columbia Circuit. Several of his former law clerks have become federal judges, including Justice Amy Coney Barrett.

Silberman died on October 2, 2022, ten days before what would have been his 87th birthday.

== See also ==
- List of Jewish American jurists
- List of Presidential Medal of Freedom recipients

== Citations ==
Political offices
Preceded by James Day Hodgson	United States Under Secretary of Labor; 1970–1973	Succeeded by Richard Schubert
Legal offices
Preceded by William Ruckelshaus	United States Deputy Attorney General; 1974–1975	Succeeded by Harold R. Tyler, Jr.
New seat	Judge of the United States Court of Appeals for the District of Columbia Circuit; 1985–2000	Succeeded by Brett Kavanaugh
Preceded by Robert W. Warren	Judge of the United States Foreign Intelligence Surveillance Court of Review; 1996–2003	Succeeded by Ralph K. Winter Jr.
Diplomatic posts
Preceded by Malcolm Toon	United States Ambassador to Yugoslavia; 1975–1976	Succeeded by Lawrence Eagleburger
Government offices
New office	Chair of the Iraq Intelligence Commission; 2004–2005; Served alongside: Chuck Robb	Position abolished
