= Todd Ames Hunter =

American politician (born 1953)

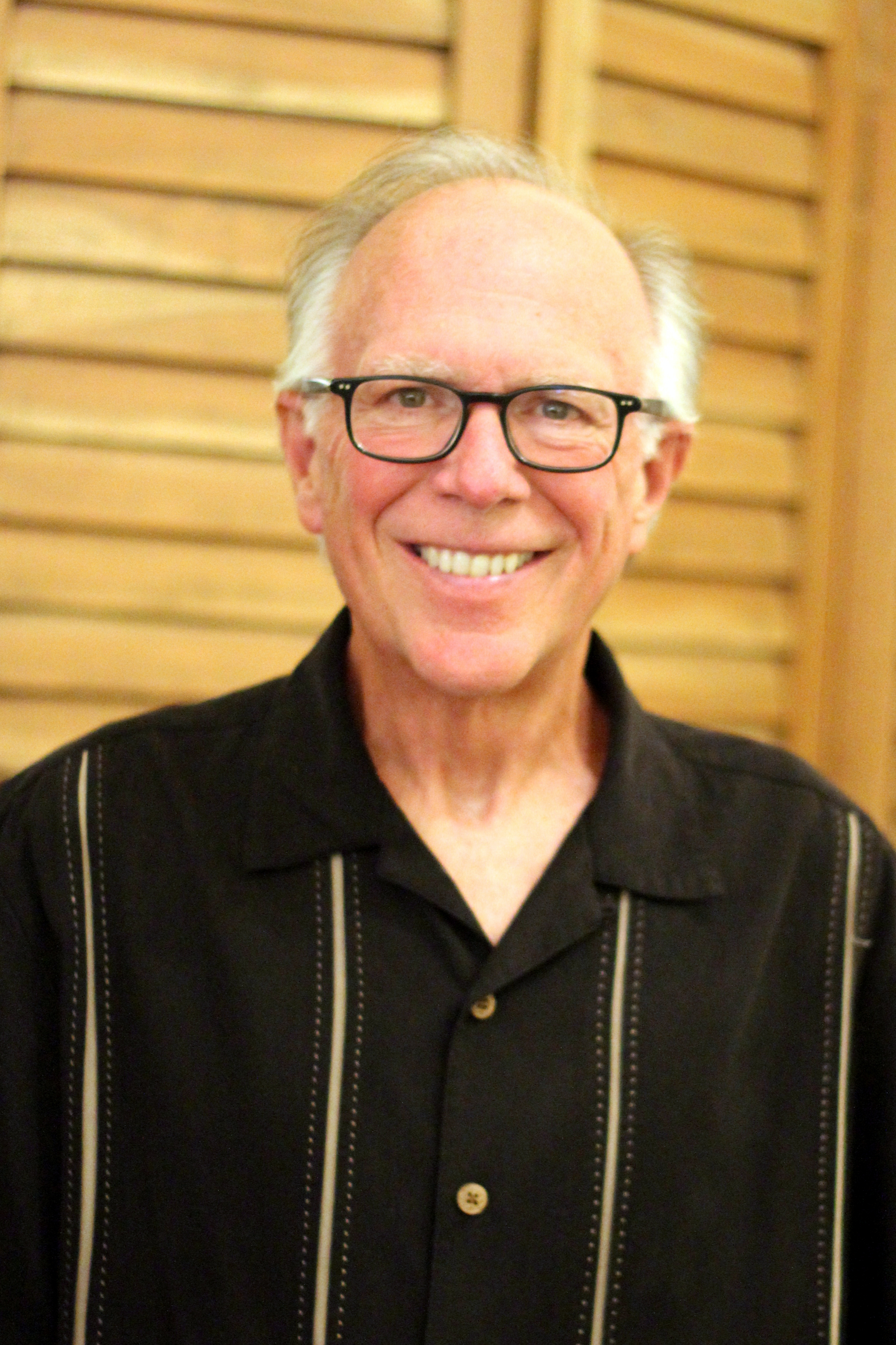

Member of the Texas House of Representatives from the 32nd district
- Incumbent
- Assumed office January 13, 2009
- Preceded by: Juan M. Garcia III
- In office January 12, 1993 – January 14, 1997
- Preceded by: Steve Holzheauser
- Succeeded by: Gene Seaman

Member of the Texas House of Representatives from the 36th district
- In office January 10, 1989 – January 12, 1993
- Preceded by: Ted B. Roberts
- Succeeded by: Sergio Munoz

Personal details
- Born: August 26, 1953 (age 73) Bartlesville, Oklahoma, U.S.
- Party: Republican (since 2009) Democratic (until at least 1997)
- Spouse: Alexis Taylor Hunter
- Children: 3
- Education: University of Kansas (BA); Southern Methodist University (JD)
- Occupation: Lawyer

Todd Ames Hunter (born August 26, 1953) is an American politician and lawyer from Corpus Christi, Texas, serving as a Republican member of the Texas House of Representatives from District 32 in Nueces County.

== Early life and education ==
Hunter was born in Bartlesville in northeastern Oklahoma to Richard and Patricia London Hunter. In 1975, he graduated from the University of Kansas, with a Bachelor of Arts degree in Political Science, Speech, and Human Relations. In 1978, he obtained his Juris Doctor degree from the Dedman School of Law at Southern Methodist University.

== Career ==
In 1978, Hunter moved to Corpus Christi, where he is a solo practitioner after leaving civil defense law in 2017 as a partner with Hunter, Barker & Fancher, LLP. He has worked for numerous law firms in Corpus Christi.

== Texas House of Representatives ==
From 1989 to 1993, Hunter represented the 36th district in the Texas House of Representatives as a Democrat. Following the redistricting with the 1990 census, he represented the 32nd district in the 1992 elections. He continued to serve in the House until 1997. In 2008, Hunter ran for reelection to the Texas House, this time as a Republican. He beat incumbent Democratic Representative Juan M. Garcia III, securing 50.13% of the vote.

Hunter has frequently served as the Chair of the House Calendars committee, which is responsible for determining when legislation is brought before the House for a vote. In 2021, Hunter was the chair of the House Committee on Redistricting. Hunter was the author the bill that created the map for the Texas House of Representatives, as well as the sponsor for the maps for the Texas Senate and Congress. In July 2025, Hunter authored the legislation creating the new boundaries for the 2025 Texas redistricting.

== Personal life ==
Hunter lives in corpus Christi and is married to his wife Alexis (née Taylor), the eldest daughter of Marcella and Leroy Taylor. Together, they have three children—Todd Ames Jr. (born 1986), Michael Taylor (born 1987), and Christina Alyson (born 1991).

Hunter is a member of All Saints Episcopal Church in Corpus Christi. He is a director and member of the advisory board of the Coastal Bend division of the Boy Scouts of America. He is affiliated with Rotary International and is a board member of Consumer Credit Counseling Service and the Texas Lyceum Association.

Political offices
Texas House of Representatives
Preceded by Juan M. Garcia, III	Texas State Representative from District 32 (now Corpus Christi; formerly Aransas, Calhoun, Nueces, and San Patricio counties); 2009–	Succeeded by Incumbent
Preceded by Steve Holzheauser (moved to District 30)	Texas State Representative from District 32 (Aransas, Calhoun, Jackson, and Nueces counties); 1993–1997	Succeeded by Gene Seaman
Preceded by Ted B. Roberts	Texas State Representative from District 36 (Aransas and Nueces counties); 1989–1993	Succeeded by Sergio Munoz
