= Nancy Pfotenhauer =

American economist

Nancy Mitchell Pfotenhauer (born 1963 as Nancy Wadley) is the president of MediaSpeak Strategies. She was a senior policy advisor and national spokesperson with the 2008 John McCain presidential campaign and political commentator on Fox News, CNN and MSNBC. She is a former executive vice president of Citizens for a Sound Economy (CSE), former president of the Independent Women's Forum, and former president of Americans for Prosperity (originally CSE).

== Career ==
Pfotenhauer started her career as graduate research assistant to economist Walter E. Williams at George Mason University, where she was taking an MA in economics. At George Mason, Pfotenhauer studied under economist Walter Williams. After graduating from George Mason University, Pfotenhauer became chief economist at the Republican National Committee (1988). She worked for George H. W. Bush's transition team (1988) and then (until 1990) for Sen. William L. Armstrong (R-CO); in 1990 she was appointed chief economist of the President's Council on Competitiveness.

=== Citizens for a Sound Economy ===
In 1995, Pfotenhauer joined Citizens for a Sound Economy as executive vice president for policy. With then husband Daniel J. Mitchell, an economist at the Heritage Foundation, she co-hosted Mitchells in the Morning, a call-in television show on National Empowerment Television, run by Paul Weyrich, co-founder of the Heritage Foundation.

=== Koch Industries ===
From 1996 to 2001, she served as director of the Washington, D.C. office of Koch, Inc., where she built and managed the team's Washington, D.C. lobbying operations, PAC, and legislative and regulatory strategies in addition to jointly running KII's government affairs operations globally. The largest privately held company in the country, KII's interests fell heavily in the energy, environment, transportation and tax fields. She ran multimillion-dollar issue campaigns at the federal and state level.

While working for Koch, she married Kurt Pfotenhauer, a mortgage industry lobbyist and former chief of staff to U.S. Senator Gordon Smith (R-OR)

=== Independent Women's Forum ===
From 2000 to 2005, she was president and CEO of the Independent Women's Forum. She was later vice chairman of IWF's board of directors from 2005 to 2007. In 2002, Pfotenhauer was nominated by President George W. Bush to serve as a delegate to the United Nations' Commission on the Status of Women and served during the 46th session of the commission. The Bush Administration also appointed her to the National Advisory Committee on Violence Against Women. Additionally, she served on advisory committees reporting directly to Secretary of Labor Elaine Chao and former Secretary of Energy Spencer Abraham.

=== Americans for Prosperity ===
From 2003 to 2007, Pfotenhauer led Americans for Prosperity, an American conservative political advocacy group.

=== 2008 John McCain presidential campaign ===
She was an advisor for the 2008 John McCain presidential campaign. During the campaign she sparked controversy by referring to areas of Virginia outside of Northern Virginia as "real Virginia", picking up on a GOP talking point that Sarah Palin promoted, namely that red states are the "real America" and more "pro-America".

In 2011, Pfotenhauer appeared as a spokeswoman for Koch, Inc. on Fox News and other media outlets.

In 2013, Pfotenhauer was a signatory to an amicus curiae brief submitted to the U.S. Supreme Court in support of same-sex marriage during the Hollingsworth v. Perry case.
