= Richard F. Schubert =

American politician and businessman

Richard F. Schubert was an American politician and businessman.

== Biography ==
=== Early life and education ===
Schubert was born in Trenton, New Jersey. He graduated cum laude with a Bachelor of Arts from Eastern Nazarene College in 1958 and with a Bachelor of Laws from Yale Law School in 1961.

=== Career ===
He became an attorney in the labor relations division for Bethlehem Steel in June 1961 and was promoted to assistant manager of the division in 1966. He was appointed executive assistant to James Day Hodgson in 1970 and was nominated to serve as the United States Solicitor of Labor by President Richard Nixon in 1971.

Schubert returned to Bethlehem Steel in February 1973. In April 1973, Nixon nominated Schubert to succeed Laurence Silberman as undersecretary of labor in April 1973. Schubert resigned, effective March 1, 1975, to return to Bethlehem Steel. He was elected president of Bethlehem Steel in 1979 and was elected vice chairman of the board of directors in 1980. He resigned from Bethlehem Steel, effective June 30, 1982.

Schubert became the president of the American Red Cross on January 1, 1983. He resigned effective May 30, 1989. He served as president and chief executive officer of the Points of Light Foundation.

Political offices
Preceded by Laurence Silberman	United States Under Secretary of Labor; 1970–1973	Succeeded by Robert O. Aders
