= Independent Women's Forum =

Non-profit organization

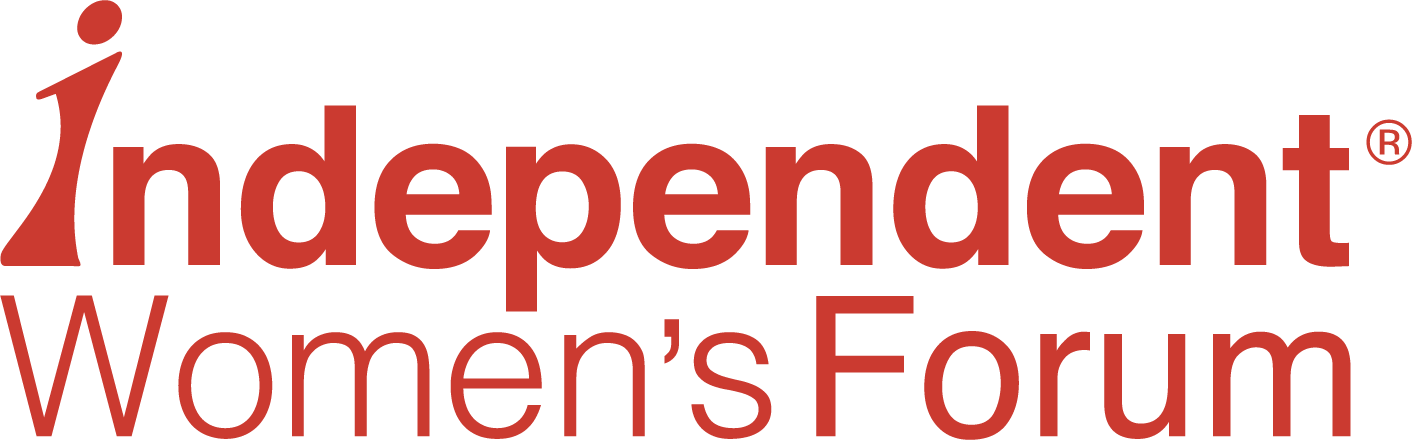
- Founded: 1992
- Founder: Rosalie Silberman, Barbara Olson, Anita K. Blair
- Type: 501(c)(3)
- Purpose: Women's rights, equity feminism, property rights, free markets, democracy, foreign policy, domestic violence, campus issues, health care, labor policy
- Location(s): 1875 I Street NW, S-500; Washington, D.C. 20006
- Coordinates: 38.9018°N 77.0428°W
- Region served: United States, Iraq, Afghanistan
- Method: Educational programs, awards, grants, political commentary
- Key people: Carrie Lukas, Heather Higgins
- Revenue: $6.6 million (2025)
- Expenses: $8.1 million (2025)
- Staff: 44 (2023)
- Website: iwf.org

The Independent Women's Forum (IWF) is an American conservative, non-profit organization focused on economic policy issues of concern to women. IWF was founded by activist Rosalie Silberman to promote a "conservative alternative to feminist tenets" following the controversial Supreme Court nomination of Clarence Thomas in 1992. IWF's sister organization is the Independent Women's Voice (IWV), a 501(c)(4) organization.

The group advocates "equity feminism", a term first used by Christina Hoff Sommers to distinguish "traditional, classically liberal, humanistic feminism" from "gender feminism", which she says opposes gender roles and patriarchy.

== Origin and history ==
Founded in 1992 by Rosalie Silberman, Anita K. Blair, and Barbara Olson, the IWF grew out of the ad hoc group "Women for Judge Thomas," created to reinforce Clarence Thomas against allegations of sexual harassment and other sex-based illegal behavior and in his stance as EEOC Chair refusing to enforce of laws against sexual harassment and discrimination in the workplace.

By 1996, the organization had some 700 dues-paying members who met regularly at luncheons to network and share ideas. Silberman was the IWF's first president; subsequent leaders have included Nancy Pfotenhauer and Anita Blair. The current president of the organization is Carrie Lukas. The IWF has been described as "a virtual 'Who's Who' of Washington's Republican establishment." In 2006, the organization had 20,337 members and a budget of $1.05 million.

== Equity feminism ==
The IWF opposes many mainstream feminist positions, describing them as "radical feminism", but rather focuses on equity feminism. IWF-affiliated writers have argued that the sex gap in income exists because of IWF women's greater demand for flexibility, fewer hours, and less travel in their careers, rather than because of sexism. In an article for the Dallas Morning News, IWF president Carrie Lukas attributed sex disparities in income to "women's own choices", writing that women "tend to place a higher priority on flexibility and personal fulfillment than do men, who focus more on pay. [women] tend to avoid jobs that require travel or relocation, and they take more time off and spend fewer hours in the office than men do. Men disproportionately take on the most dirty, dangerous and depressing jobs."

The IWF also argues that feminists manufacture domestic violence legislation that "is misleading because it is premised on and meant to advance feminist ideology." This falls under their larger belief that "feminists ... lie about data, are opportunistic, construct men as the enemy, and cast women as helpless victims."

Conservative commentators have praised the IWF; Linda Chavez credited Women's Figures: An Illustrated Guide to the Economic Progress of Women in America, a 1999 book published in part by the IWF, with "debunk[ing] much of the feminists' voodoo economics." Writing in Capitalism Magazine, John Stossel cited Michelle Bernard's 2007 book Women's Progress as evidence that "American women have never enjoyed more options or such a high quality of life."

Some writers have asserted that feminist rhetoric is used by the IWF for anti-feminist ends.

== Domestic policy and programs ==
=== United States healthcare policy ===
In 2009, IWF produced a political advertisement run on YouTube and in eight states arguing that "300,000 American women with breast cancer might have died" if U.S. healthcare included a government-funded option. FactCheck.org labeled the IWF ad "a false appeal to women's fears", finding that the IWF ad relied on "old statistics, faulty logic and false insinuations."

==== Title IX enforcement ====
Since shortly after the organization's inception, the IWF has joined with groups like the National Wrestling Coaches Association in opposing the manner in which the United States Department of Education's Office for Civil Rights has enforced Title IX legislation requiring sex equality in public educational investment. The 1972 Title IX law that states: "No person in the United States shall, on the basis of sex, be excluded from participation in, be denied the benefits of, or be subjected to discrimination under any education program or activity receiving Federal financial assistance."

==== Campus programs ====
The organization emphasizes traditional family roles and cultural norms as essential for civil society. In particular, IWF encourages young women to embrace what it presents as a healthy attitude towards dating, courtship, and marriage. This emphasis is reflected by high-profile, sometimes controversial work on college campuses where IWF sponsors advertising campaigns and literature distribution to promote its views. One such effort included the running of advertisements with provocative headings such as "The Ten Most Common Feminist Myths." IWF also offers internships and sponsors an annual essay contest open to full-time female undergraduate students.

As a reaction to reports of growing promiscuity on college campuses and the V-Day movement founded by Eve Ensler, IWF created its "Take Back the Date" campus program to "reclaim Valentine's Day from radical feminists on campus who use a day of love and romance to promote vulgar and promiscuous behavior through activities like The Vagina Monologues." Specifically addressing the controversial play, IWF's "Take Back the Date" release states that, "although the play raises money for a good cause, the hyper-sexualized play counteracts the positive contributions of the feminist movement and degrades women."

In an article in The Guardian, feminist writer Jessica Valenti asserted that the program was merely "[r]evamping outdated notions of femininity and positioning them as cutting edge."

=== Project 2025 ===
The IWF was a member of the advisory board of Project 2025, a collection of conservative and right-wing policy proposals from the Heritage Foundation to reshape the United States federal government and consolidate executive power should the Republican nominee win the 2024 presidential election.

== International programs ==
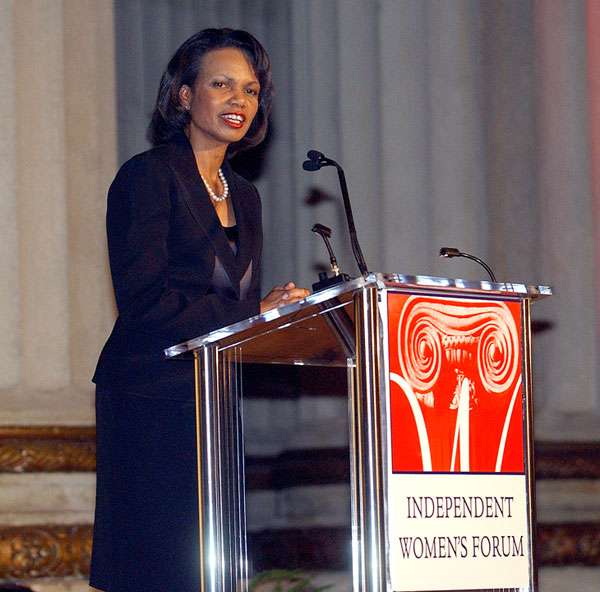
Condoleezza Rice speaking to an IWF audience in 2006 after receiving the organization's "Woman of Valor" award

Since its founding, IWF has sponsored numerous conferences, panels, and other programs designed to promote its message to an international audience. These primarily include activities and events discussing or taking place in the countries of Iraq and Afghanistan, and focus on promoting female participation in democracy.

The IWF has also had a hand in international women's programs and initiatives. For example, "in the spring of 2002, the IWF's President, Nancy Pfotenhauer, was appointed by U.S. President George W. Bush to be a delegate to the United Nations Commission on the Status of Women."

== Funding ==
Donors to IWF have included Donors Trust, the John William Pope Foundation, the Lynde and Harry Bradley Foundation, the Scaife Foundations, the Randolph Foundation, and the John M. Olin Foundation. Another major sponsor is the Charles Koch Institute, while Facebook, Dick DeVos and the Walton Family Foundation have also given money to the organization.

== Board members ==
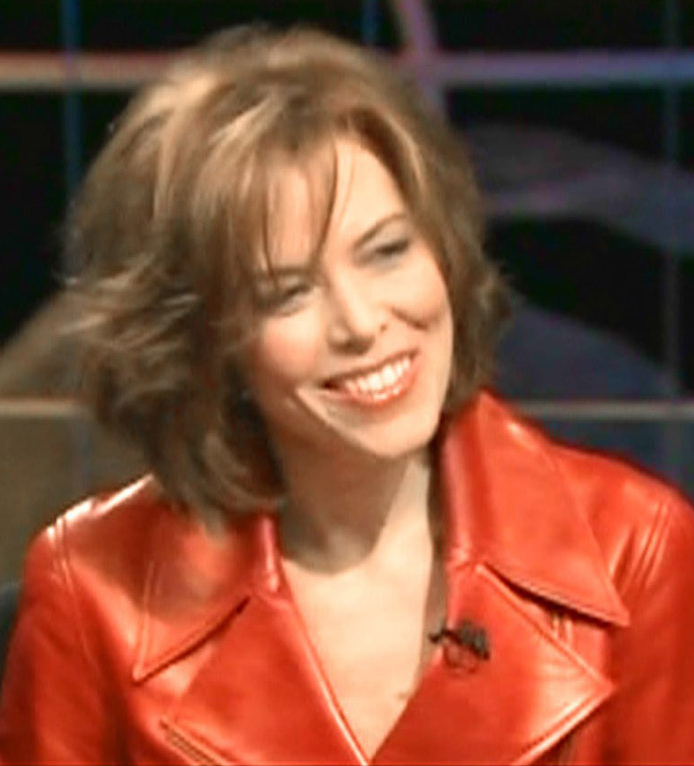
IWF Chairman Heather Higgins appearing on Real Time with Bill Maher, 2006

As of 2026, the organization's board of directors includes Heather Higgins (chairperson), Giovanna Cugnasca, Nan Hayworth, Larry Kudlow, Adele Malpass, Abby Moffat, Mike Rydin, and Dick Weiss.

== See also ==
- Women in conservatism in the United States
