= Randolph Foundation =

The Randolph Foundation
- Founded: 1991
- Type: 501(c)(3) tax-exempt foundation
- Purpose: Public policy, education
- Location: New York City, New York, United States
- Region served: Primarily United States, with some international projects
- Method: Organizational and research grants; PBS documentaries
- Key people: Heather Higgins, R. Randolph Richardson, James E. Higgins, JoAnn Beyer, Lisa Warner, Polly Jackson Freiss
- Employees: 5

The Randolph Foundation is a New York-based charitable foundation that first operated in 1972 as the H. Smith Richardson Charitable Trust. It transitioned to independence from the Smith Richardson Foundation, assuming the name of The Randolph Foundation from 1991 to 1993, and was reconstituted as a NY non-profit corporation in 2002. The foundation provides funding primarily for public policy related projects. Heather Higgins (née Richardson) is its president.

== Creation and mission ==
The Randolph Foundation was established as a charitable trust under the will of H. Smith Richardson in 1972. H. Smith Richardson was an heir of Lunsford Richardson, founder of the Vicks chemical company.

Chartered with a broad mandate, it was operated under the aegis of the Smith Richardson Foundation's public policy arm, making grants that were, for the most part, indistinguishable from the focus of the Smith Richardson Foundation per se.

In the spring of 1991, the Randolph Foundation began to operate as an organization—under new Executive Director Heather Higgins—and in 1993 became wholly separate from the Smith Richardson Foundation. As of 2005, the foundation held just under $70 million in assets.

== Notable projects ==
The Randolph Foundation sponsors numerous projects that examine current public policy and offer policy alternatives. Such projects include television programs, films, books, and academic studies.

=== Television and film ===
Through its funding of New River Media, the foundation serves as a major source of sponsorship for PBS's weekly Think Tank, which features commentator Ben J. Wattenberg. Think Tank episodes have featured discussion on such issues as gun control and controversies in modern feminism.

Again working with New River Media and the team from Think Tank, the foundation provided funding for Heaven on Earth: the Rise and Fall of Socialism. The 2005 film was shown as a three-part mini-series on PBS and is a companion film to the 2002 book of the same name by Joshua Muravchik. A PBS synopsis of the film portrayed its central ideas as follows:

A 2007 film sponsored in part by the Randolph Foundation.

As an idea that changed the way people thought, socialism's success was spectacular. As a critique of capitalism that helped spawn modern social safety nets and welfare states, its success was appreciable. As a model for the development of post-colonial states, the socialist model proved disappointing, fostering economic stagnation among millions of the world's poorest people. And in its most violent forms, socialism was calamitous, claiming scores of millions of lives and helping to make the twentieth century the bloodiest ever.

The Randolph Foundation was one source of funding for God and the Inner City, a one-hour 2003 documentary chiefly backed by the Pew Charitable Trusts which examined both faith-based and secular charities operating in inner-city environs. The foundation also provided financial support to Free to Choose Media for The Power of Choice, a 2007 film biography of Chicago School economist Milton Friedman.

=== Books ===
In 1993, the foundation began providing support to Marquette University political scientist Christopher Wolfe for a project that would eventually culminate in his 2006 book, Natural Law Liberalism. In Natural Law Liberalism, Wolfe advances the position that American public policy should be based on classical natural law theory in the Thomist tradition, which he argues results in policies characteristic of political liberalism.

TRF was also a source of funding for a book produced by the free-market environmentalist Property and Environment Research Center (PERC). Eco-nomics: What Everyone Should Know about Economics and the Environment was penned by agricultural economist Richard L. Stroup and published by the Cato Institute in 2003. The book, which won a 2004 award from the Atlas Economic Research Foundation, targets the "educated lay person," offering public policy recommendations in keeping with the private, market approach to conservation.

Naomi Schaefer Riley received a grant from the foundation for her book, God on the Quad: How Religious Colleges and the Missionary Generation Are Changing America. The 2004 St. Martin's Press offering was the result of research conducted by Riley at twenty higher education institutions affiliated with a religious group. The book examines classes and student life at institutions including Brigham Young University, Baylor University, and Bob Jones University and discusses the potential impact of these schools' growing attendance on those interested in "bringing faith into the professional world."

Currently, TRF is funding a Council on Foreign Relations book project by CFR senior fellow Max Boot. The project, which has been in progress since 2003 and is also sponsored by several other organizations,

...examines four major technological revolutions of the past 500 years (Gunpowder, Industrial, Mechanization, and Computerization) and how they transformed warfare and the international balance-of-power.... In addition, Mr. Boot applies the lessons of history to current dilemmas, examining crucial questions such as how long America's military advantage will last, and what the United States can do to preserve its hegemony.

=== Research ===
Besides the research performed by Riley for God on the Quad, other studies funded by the Randolph Foundation examined higher education in the United States. A controversial 2004 study by TRF-supported scholars found that "72 percent of teachers at American colleges and universities identify themselves as liberal, compared with 15 percent who describe themselves as conservative, with the liberal tilt greatest at elite schools and in humanities and social sciences departments." This study was cited by various columnists including Cal Thomas. Its methodology and conclusions were criticized by the American Association of University Professors.

TRF is funding a six-year University of Virginia study examining parental leave policies in United States universities and their possible effect on gender roles. According to a description on the university's website, the fundamental questions to be addressed by the study relate to the fact that,

There is an ongoing quarrel in the academic literature between evolutionary psychologists and most feminists. The evolutionary psychologists believe that there are deep-seated hormonal and other reasons why women have done and probably always will do the vast majority of baby care. Most feminists believe that society constructs for women the role of baby care and that, with effort, this can be changed.

== Organizations funded ==
In addition to sponsoring the projects noted above, TRF has also served as a source of funding for a number of other organizations, including:

=== Policy and advocacy organizations ===
- Acton Institute for the Study of Religion and Liberty
- American Academy for Liberal Education
- Americans for Tax Reform (ATR Foundation)
- Association of Community Employment Programs for the Homeless (ACE)
- Center for the Study of Popular Culture
- Center for Security Policy
- Claremont Institute
- Committee for Economic Development
- Competitive Enterprise Institute
- Copenhagen Consensus Center
- Ethics and Public Policy Center
- Federalist Society for Law and Public Policy Studies
- The Hoover Institution on War, Revolution, and Peace
- Hudson Institute
- Independent Women's Forum
- Institute on Religion and Democracy
- International Task Force on Euthanasia and Assisted Suicide
- Manhattan Institute
- Middle East Media Research Institute
- Philanthropy Roundtable
- Statistical Assessment Service

=== Educational institutions ===
- Cornell University
- Hillsdale College
- Institute for Humane Studies
- Johns Hopkins University
- Marquette University
- Princeton University
- Rutgers University
- Saint Vincent College
- Smith College
- University of California
- University of Virginia
- Yale University
