= Jane Watson Stetson =

American political operative

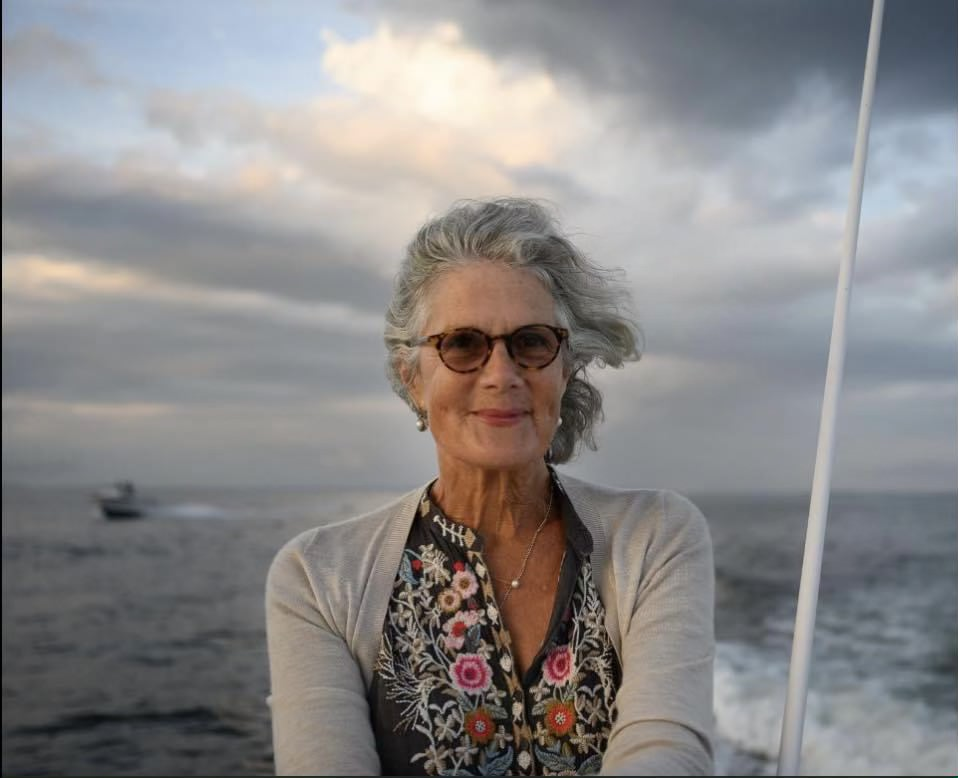
- Other names: Jane Stetson

Jane Watson Stetson is an American political professional who previously served as National Finance Chair for the Democratic National Committee, the organization which governs the Democratic Party of the United States. She served as Chair from 2009 to 2013. She has also held positions for U.S. Representative Peter Welch of Vermont, Vermont Governor Howard Dean, and President Barack Obama.

== Family ==
Jane Stetson is the granddaughter of Thomas J. Watson (the founder of IBM) and the daughter of Arthur K. Watson (chairman and President of IBM World Trade Corporation and former United States Ambassador to France). Stetson is originally a native of the New York area, but now works and resides in Norwich, Vermont and Washington, D.C., with her husband, E. William (Bill) Stetson III, and three daughters: Nancy, Katharine and Grace.

== Education ==
Stetson studied at the Sorbonne and the American College in Paris, France. Fluent in French, in 2013, she was named as a potential U.S. ambassador to France.

== Philanthropy ==
Stetson is a member of the Board of Overseers for Dartmouth-Hitchcock Medical Center where she sits on the Community Advisory Board, which promotes community health. Stetson also co-founded the William E. Boyle Community Pediatrics Program which works to create family centered care atmosphere, and practice medicine under a collaborative model.

Mrs. Stetson has served on the boards of The Mountain School of Milton Academy in Vershire, Vermont and Proctor Academy in Andover, New Hampshire, as well as the Woodrow Wilson International Center for Scholars in Washington and the Piney Woods Country Life School in Piney Woods, Mississippi. She is also an advisor for the Vermont Intercultural Semesters, an international student enrichment program.
