= Heather Higgins =

American political commentator (born 1959)

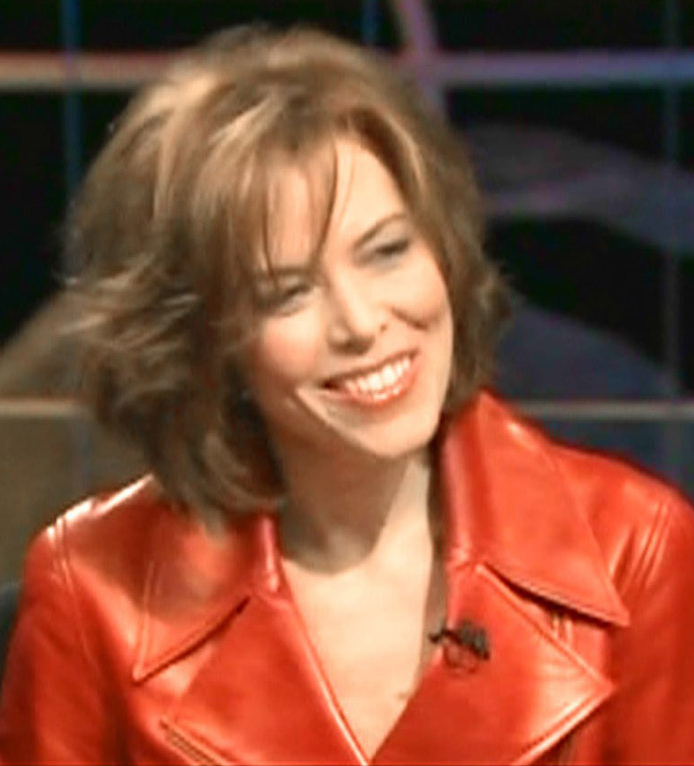
- Higgins in a 2006 episode of Real Time with Bill Maher
- Born: September 21, 1959 (age 66); Atlanta, Georgia, U.S.
- Occupations: Businesswoman, political commentator

Heather Richardson Higgins (born September 21, 1959) is an American businesswoman, political commentator, and non-profit sector executive. She is the CEO of Independent Women's Voice and chairman of its sister organization, Independent Women's Forum, organizations that are designed to promote traditional, conservative values.

Higgins has been associated with a number of different political and policy organizations. These range from non-profit, non-partisan organizations like the Council on Foreign Relations to those with more pronounced conservative political affinities, such as the Hoover Institute, National Empowerment Television network, and Irving Kristol's The Public Interest.

== Personal background ==
Born in Atlanta, Georgia, and raised in Manhattan, New York City, Higgins began her undergraduate studies in 1977 at Wellesley College. She graduated cum laude from Wellesley in 1981, earning a B.A. She then moved back to New York City and enrolled in the M.B.A. finance program at New York University's graduate school of business. After leaving NYU for several years to work as a research analyst, marketer, and portfolio manager at a small firm, she resumed her studies there in 1986 and was awarded her graduate degree in 1987. She currently lives in Manhattan with her husband James and their three children.

== Journalist and commentator ==
In the 1980s, Higgins began writing editorial columns for the Wall Street Journal. During this time, she also became an assistant editor at Irving Kristol's now-defunct quarterly, The Public Interest. Higgins' editorial writing and policy work have led to appearances on a variety of news/commentary programs, including Hardball with Chris Matthews, Politically Incorrect, Real Time with Bill Maher, Crossfire, Equal Time and Good Morning America. With Newt Gingrich, she co-hosted The Progress Report on the now-defunct National Empowerment Television. When asked about Higgins' television appearances, Bill Maher said, "Oh God, she could talk about anything."

Higgins was co-editor of The Quotable Paul Johnson (1994), a book of collected quotations from the popular historian.

== Investment career ==
Before Higgins' 1991 entry into the non-profit sector, she worked as a Wall Street portfolio manager for seven years, eventually attaining the position of vice president of U.S. Trust before it became a subsidiary of the Charles Schwab Corporation. On February 3, 2006, she was elected to be a Director and Trustee of sixteen of UBS's registered investment companies, which consisted of thirty-six mutual funds as of January 2007.

== Non-profit roles and policy work ==
Higgins has been heavily involved with non-profit organizations. She is chairman and CEO of Independent Women's Voice, a 501(c)(4) social welfare organization, chairman of the Independent Women's Forum, co-founder of the Alliance For Charitable Reform, and has been president and director of New York's Randolph Foundation since 1991. She was also the executive director of the Council on Culture & Community.

In addition to helming the above organizations, Higgins' non-profit experience includes her position on the executive committee of the board of overseers for the Hoover Institution and her membership in the Council on Foreign Relations. She is also a trustee of the Committee for Economic Development, vice-chairman of the Washington, D.C.–based Philanthropy Roundtable and a former member of the W.H. Brady Foundation's board of directors.

In November 2013, Campaigns & Elections named Higgins to their list of top fifty political influencers to watch in 2014.

=== Responses to 2010 special elections ===
After Republican Scott Brown defeated Democrat Martha Coakley in the special election to select Ted Kennedy's successor, Independent Women's Voice commissioned a survey which Higgins cited as demonstrating that voters were motivated by the potential impact that the election was perceived as playing in healthcare reform and other national policy debates. Higgins also reported that the survey showed that, "while women overall voted 53%–45% for Coakley, Independent women voted 67–33% for Brown. Given an option between reducing taxes and regulations on small business or increasing government spending, 51% preferred tax cuts while 30% chose infrastructure."

In the May 2010 special House election in Hawaii's 2nd congressional district, Independent Women's Voice ran advertisements critical of former Democratic Congressman Ed Case. The advertisements asserted that Case "had voted to raise taxes 72 times and had received failing grades from anti-pork barrel spending groups such as the National Taxpayers Union." According to Politico, the group spent "more than $200,000" on the anti-Case advertising campaign. Federal Election Commission filings indicate that the organization spent $237,500 on the effort as of early May 2010.

=== ACR advocacy for private foundations ===
In a letter published in The Hill, Higgins and fellow Alliance for Charitable Reform co-founder Dan Peters responded to discussion of legislative regulatory proposals, saying that, "ACR believes that every dollar of tax increases on foundations is to the federal government rather than a dollar to charities, and the ACR is troubled by that notion.... We cannot adopt a one-size-fits-all solution that disadvantages smaller organizations. We must do everything possible to encourage philanthropy and not create barriers to charitable giving."

== Political views ==
Columnist Suzanne Fields, in an article discussing Higgins and IWF co-founder Lisa Schiffren, states that they "are mothers and relate to women who are not ideologically doctrinaire, but who are instinctively conservative on war and taxes."

In an interview with the Acton Institute, Higgins expressed her fundamental opposition to government social programs insofar as they compete with or replace private charities, stating,

"Government programs pose serious problems for community institutions when they directly compete with those organizations which attempt to provide charity, while seeking to assist the individual beyond materialistic ends. Properly performed charity not only feeds you, but keeps your self-respect intact."

In her review of Thomas DiLorenzo and James T. Bennett's book Unhealthy Charities: Hazardous to Your Health and Wealth, which examines the operation of health charities, Higgins argues that,

"The problem is not that there are bad people running these organizations; almost anyone sitting on the board of such an organization would do the same thing in this environment. The problem is having centralized government funding in the first place. Reallocate the dollars, disperse the authority, create competing funding sources, and all these problems and false incentives will be instantly mitigated."

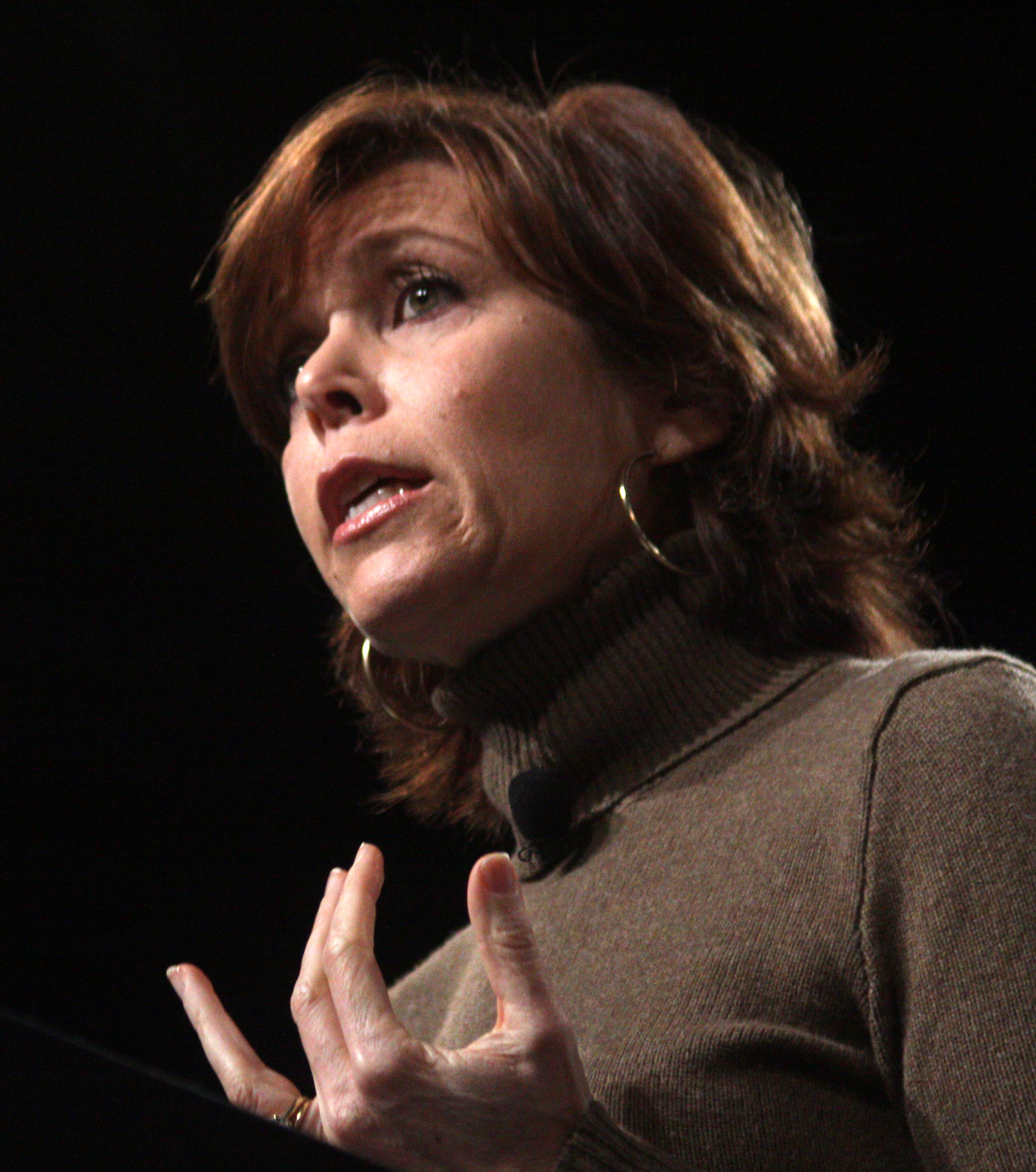
Higgins speaking in Phoenix, Arizona, 2011

George magazine published an article in its 1995 first issue, entitled "The Heather Report," in which Higgins' views were summarized as "essentially libertarian," and in agreement with the idea that "Centralized government will matter less and less.... We are in the midst of a 'great shift' from 'elitist to populist,' from a machine 'which is controlled and planned' to an organic system that, 'following this new paradigm, has faith in people, faith in their capacities, faith in their choices.'" Higgins was characterized as a link between the "wide-eyed" academic community and "flinty" political practitioners.

In a 1995 Wall Street Journal column, Paul Gigot described Higgins as an "idea broker," explaining that she prefers not to be associated with political parties. Gigot included a quotation from her, in which she stated, "I am not really interested in a party.... If the Democrats had really been New Democrats, that would have been great. If these Republicans become Old Republicans, they'll lose me too." William Galston, a senior domestic policy adviser in the Clinton administration, said, "I see Heather as an intellectual and policy entrepreneur with some real moral commitments.... I don't see her as a sharply partisan figure, certainly not in the way she deals with people."

== See also ==
- Independent Women's Forum
- Philanthropy Roundtable
- Randolph Foundation
