= Bill Stetson =

American businessman and environmental policy advisor

- Born: Eugene William Stetson III c. August 2, 1960 (age 66); United States
- Education: Harvard University, John F. Kennedy School of Government
- Occupations: Businessman, film producer, and environmental policy advisor
- Known for: Environmental policy advisor to organizations
- Spouse: Jane Watson Stetson
- Children: 3

Eugene William "Bill" Stetson III is an American businessman, film producer and environmental policy advisor to numerous entrepreneurial, not-for-profit and political organizations.

== Early life and education ==
Stetson is the grandson of Eugene W. Stetson, a corporate and banking pioneer who was involved in early ownership of Coca-Cola and expansions of the Illinois Central Railroad and J.P. Morgan & Co., and the great grandson of Lunsford Richardson, a U.S. pharmacist and entrepreneur who founded the Vicks Chemical Company (which became Richardson Vicks Inc.), which owned companies such as Vidal Sassoon and Pantene and created a number of well-known products, including Vicks VapoRub, Clearasil, Nyquil, and Oil of Olay cream.

Stetson earned his bachelor's degree in government from Harvard University in 1982, where he was a fellow to the Harvard Institute of Politics and member of the renowned Hasty Pudding Club. He attended the Harvard Graduate School of Arts and Sciences and the John F. Kennedy School of Government, where he studied energy and natural resources. Stetson also studied at the Austro-American Institute in Vienna, Austria, where he focused on European government.

== Career ==
=== Business ===
Stetson served as CEO of Fairhill Oil & Gas Corporation, the New York parent company of Canadian energy and exploration firm Fairhill Oil Ltd. While at Fairhill, Stetson worked to transform the company from a traditional oil and gas firm to a profitable natural gas business. He has served on the board of directors for Piedmont Financial Company, based in Greensboro, North Carolina. Stetson's business endeavors and major investments since the late 1990s have focused on socially responsible companies such as Tom's of Maine and the Beech Hill Farm in Rockport, Maine (formerly the largest commercial organic blueberry operation in the state of Maine), which is now operated by the Coastal Mountains Land Trust.

=== Environment ===
Stetson sits on the Board of Directors of Foundation for Our Future, an energy and environmental think tank. He directed the Vermont and New Hampshire operations of the Connecticut River Watershed Council, and served as a supervisor of the Ottauquechee Natural Resources Conservation District (U.S. Department of Agriculture).

Stetson is co-founder of River Watch Network (later successfully merged with River Network which is based in Portland, Oregon), and served as a board member of the Harvard University Committee for the Environment, which created the Harvard University Center for the Environment. Stetson was a founding board member of the Climate Speakers Network, which was subsequently absorbed into the Climate Reality Project.

=== Political activity ===
Stetson has served as an environmental policy advisor to numerous political campaigns, including the Presidential campaigns of Senator Gary Hart (D-CO), Representative Dick Gephardt (D-MO), Governor Howard Dean (D-VT), Senator John Kerry (D-MA), and Governor Bill Clinton (D-AR). In 2008, he served as a member of the Rapid Response Energy & Environment Team on the Obama for America Campaign for Senator Barack Obama (D-IL). Other specific advisor roles include Advisor to the Environment & Economic Subcommittee for Environmental Advisors to Governor Howard Dean, a member of the Council of Environmental Advisers for Governor James Douglas (R-VT), Governor Peter Shumlin's Governor's Council on Energy and the Environment, Vermont State Co-chair of the Kerry for President Campaign, and Vermont Chair of Environmentalists for Clinton/Gore 1992 Campaign. Stetson also served as advisor to the Democratic National Convention Committee (DNCC) in Denver, Colorado, developing pro-environmental convention practices as a National Advisory Board member of the DNC.

== Philanthropy/board service ==
Bill Stetson served as a Trustee and Governor for the Smith Richardson Foundation (SRF). Created in 1935, the SRF's mission is to contribute to important public debates and to help address both domestic and international public policy challenges. With its endowment of over $800 million, the SRF remains one of the most prominent domestic and foreign policy funders, awarding grants to major think tanks and university research centers across the United States. Stetson also is a Trustee to the Grace Jones Richardson Trust, which make grants in the areas of arts, education, and health & human services, and the H. Smith Richardson Testamentary Trust, which controls significant assets including 6,000 acres (24 km^{2}) of protected land in the North Carolina's Blue Ridge Mountains.

Stetson has served on the board of Vermont Public Radio, and currently is a board member of Vermont PBS. Stetson was the founding president of the Boatwright Foundation, which gives primarily in areas of pediatric medicine and the environment.

In 2011, Bill Stetson was appointed by President Barack Obama to the President's Advisory Committee on the Arts. He was appointed chairman of the committee by President Joe Biden in 2022.

== Film/television/radio production ==
Stetson was the founding President of the Vermont Film Commission, which has attracted feature films such as The Cider House Rules, Me, Myself and Irene, and What Lies Beneath to Vermont. He has produced What We Want, What We Believe: The Black Panther Party Library; Citizen Suits (for The Creative Coalition) starring Alec Baldwin and Robert F. Kennedy Jr.; Environmental Insight, an environmental radio talk show at Dartmouth College; and A Closer Walk, an AIDS documentary for PBS, directed by Academy Award nominee Robert Bilheimer and narrated by Glenn Close and Will Smith. Stetson also served as an adviser for Earth and the American Dream, an HBO movie for Earth Day.

Stetson currently is completing production of "The Current Revolution" film series for The American Resilience Project, where he serves on the advisory council.

== Personal life ==
Stetson is married to Jane Watson Stetson, the former National Finance Chair for the Democratic National Committee in the United States and granddaughter of Thomas J. Watson, the founder of IBM. They reside in Norwich, Vermont and have three daughters Nancy, Katharine, and Grace.
