= Texas's 32nd House of Representatives district =

American legislative district

Texas's 32nd State House of Representatives district
Representative
Todd Ames Hunter; R–Corpus Christi
since 2009

District 32 is a district in the Texas House of Representatives. It was created in the 3rd Legislature (1849–1851).

The district encompasses the entirety of Aransas County and nearly half of Nueces County. It includes the cities of Port Aransas, Rockport, Fulton, and half of Corpus Christi, the biggest city in the district, (though the city is split between districts) accounting for nearly half of the cities representation in the chamber. It has been represented by Todd Ames Hunter since 2009.
