= William A. Navas Jr. =

United States general

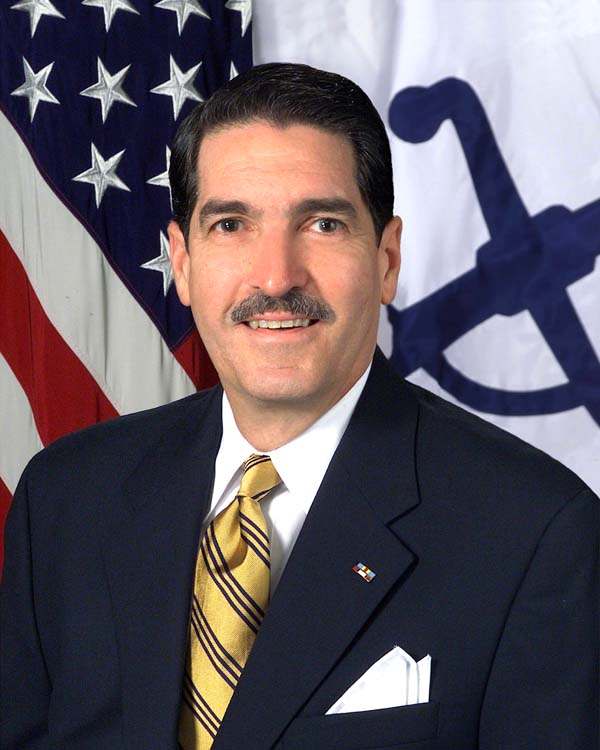

Assistant Secretary of the Navy (Manpower and Reserve Affairs)
- Acting; July 17, 2001 – January 7, 2008
- President: George W. Bush
- Preceded by: Bonnie Morehouse (acting)
- Succeeded by: Anita K. Blair (acting)

Personal details
- Born: December 15, 1942 (age 83) Mayagüez, Puerto Rico
- Education: University of Puerto Rico at Mayagüez (BS); University of Bridgeport (MEng)

Military service
- Allegiance: United States of America
- Branch/service: United States Army Reserve United States Army Army National Guard
- Years of service: 1965–1998
- Rank: Major general
- Commands: Company A, 168th Engineer Battalion; Company C, 130th Engineer Battalion; 125th Military Police Battalion; 1st Battalion, 296th Infantry Regiment; Combined Task Force, 193rd Infantry Brigade; Director, Army National Guard
- Battles/wars: Vietnam War
- Awards: Defense Distinguished Service Medal; Army Distinguished Service Medal; Defense Superior Service Medal; Legion of Merit; Bronze Star Medal

William A. Navas Jr. (born December 15, 1942) is a retired United States Army major general who served as the director of the Army National Guard. He is also the first Puerto Rican to be named an Assistant Secretary of the Navy.

== Early life and education ==
Navas was born in Mayagüez, Puerto Rico, on December 15, 1942. His family has a long tradition of military service, including his grandfather, Colonel Antonio M. Navas, who served in both World Wars. His father, Captain William A. Navas Sr. served in World War II and had a successful career in civil engineering upon his retirement from the military.

Navas received his primary and secondary education in his hometown of Mayagüez. In high school he joined Zeta Mu Gamma fraternity. After graduating from high school, he enrolled in the University of Puerto Rico at Mayagüez, and received his Bachelor of Science degree in civil engineering. He joined the Beta-Activo chapter of Phi Sigma Alpha fraternity, and served as chapter president from 1963 to 1964.

In addition to his degree from the University of Puerto Rico, Navas completed a Master of Science degree in Management Engineering at the University of Bridgeport.

Navas completed Army qualification courses for the Engineer, Military Police, and Infantry branches. He also completed specialty courses including Jungle Warfare. He was the Distinguished Graduate of his class at the United States Army Command and General Staff College, and graduated from the Inter-American Defense College. Navas also completed the Program for Senior Managers in Government at Harvard University's John F. Kennedy School of Government.

== Career ==
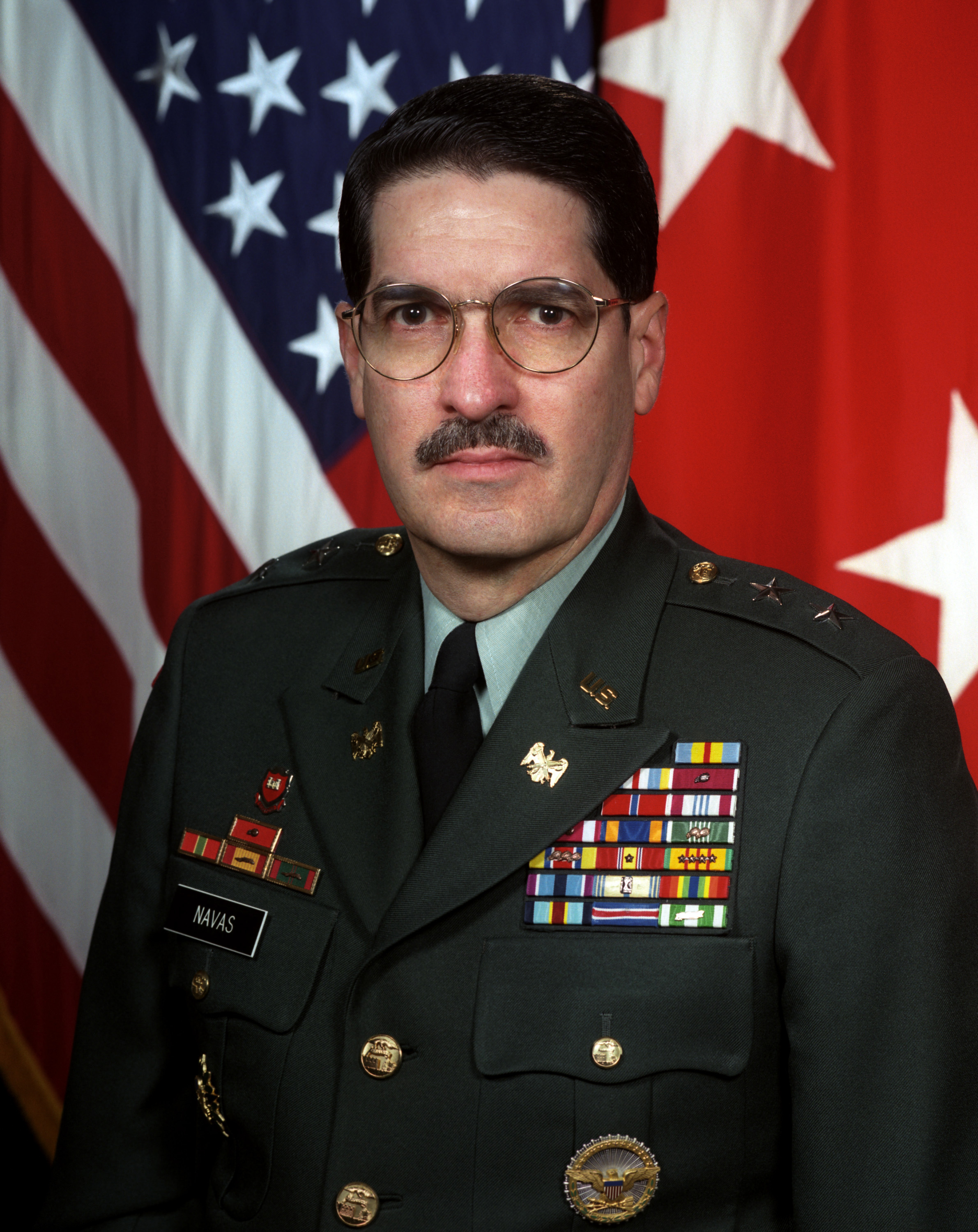
Major General William A. Navas Jr. as Director, Army National Guard, circa 1998

Navas completed the ROTC program while in college, and joined the United States Army as a second lieutenant of Engineers. He served more than five years on active duty, primarily in West Germany. From 1968 to 1969 he served in Vietnam as commander of Company A, 168th Engineer Battalion.

In 1970 Navas joined his family's construction business (Navas y Moreda), and became a member of the Puerto Rico Army National Guard. He advanced through a series of command and staff assignments, including command of the 125th Military Police Battalion, 1st Battalion, 296th Infantry Regiment and Combined Task Force, 193rd Infantry Brigade, attaining the rank of colonel in 1981.

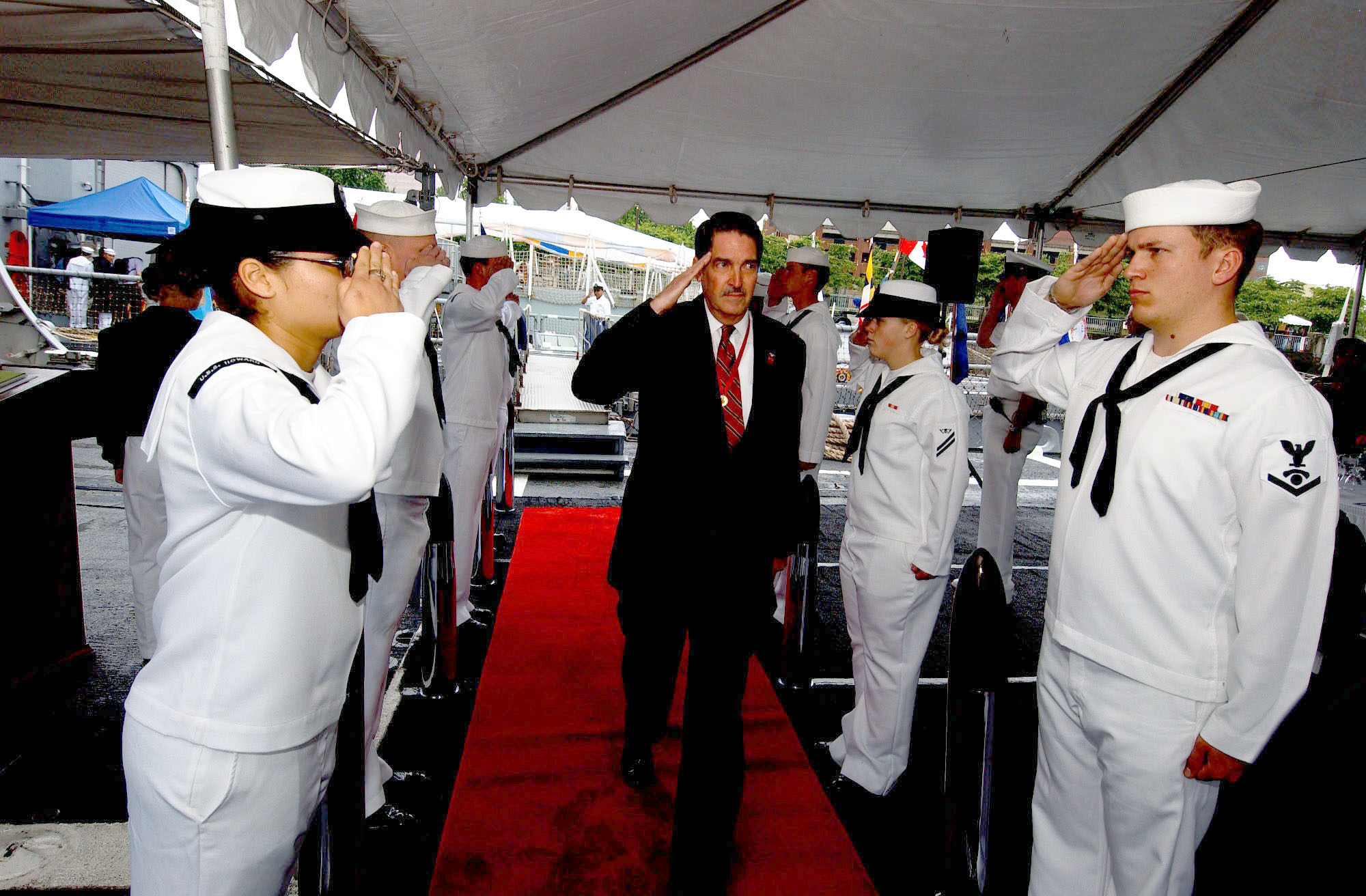
Navas in June 2007, being greeted by U.S. Navy sailors as he boards the USS Howard (DDG-83)

In 1981 he became a full-time member of the National Guard. After serving in several assignments at the Headquarters of the Puerto Rico National Guard, in 1987 he was selected to succeed Richard D. Dean as deputy director of the Army National Guard and promoted to brigadier general.

In 1990 he was chosen for the position of Vice Chief of the National Guard Bureau and promoted to major general.

Navas served as Vice Chief until 1992, when he became executive officer of the Reserve Forces Policy Board.

From September 1994 through October 1995 Navas was Deputy Assistant Secretary of Defense for Reserve Affairs.

In October 1995, Navas was assigned as director of the Army National Guard, and he served until May, 1998. He was succeeded by Roger C. Schultz.

From June, 1998 until retiring from the military in October, 1998 Navas was a special assistant in the Office of the Vice Chief of Staff of the United States Army.

=== Assistant Secretary of the Navy ===
After retiring from the military Navas became the chairman of the American Veteran's Committee for Puerto Rico Self-Determination, an organization which he co-founded.

On June 6, 2001, Navas was nominated by President George W. Bush to serve as the Assistant Secretary of the Navy (Manpower and Reserve Affairs). He was sworn in on July 17, 2001, and served through January, 2008.

From 2008 to 2011 Navas served as executive director of the National Security Professional Development Integration Office at the United States Department of Defense, the first individual to hold this position.

== Later work ==
Since 2011, Navas has been a senior advisor at Dawson & Associates, a Washington, D.C. consulting firm.

== Military decorations and awards ==
Office of the Secretary of Defense Identification Badge
Army Staff Identification Badge
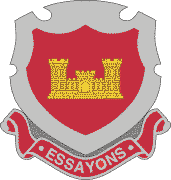
Regimental Insignia

Defense Distinguished Service Medal
Army Distinguished Service Medal
Defense Superior Service Medal
Legion of Merit (with 1 Oak Leaf Cluster)
Bronze Star
Defense Meritorious Service Medal
Meritorious Service Medal (with 1 Oak Leaf Cluster)
Air Medal
Army Commendation Medal (with 3 bronze Oak Leaf Clusters)
Army Reserve Components Achievement Medal (with 2 bronze Oak Leaf Clusters)
Meritorious Unit Commendation (with 1 Oak Leaf Cluster)
Army Superior Unit Award
National Defense Service Medal (with one bronze Service Star)
Humanitarian Service Medal (Puerto Rico Flood Relief Operations 1985)
Vietnam Service Medal (with 4 bronze Service Stars)
Armed Forces Reserve Medal (with bronze Hourglass)
Army Service Medal
Army Overseas Service Ribbon
Army Reserve Components Overseas Training Ribbon (with award numeral 3)
Vietnam Gallantry Cross Unit Citation with Palm
Vietnam Civil Actions Medal
Vietnam Campaign Medal

=== Other recognition ===
- In 2001, Navas was honored with the Achievement Award by Hispanic magazine.
- In 2008 he was awarded the "Caballero Sigma" medal by Phi Sigma Alpha fraternity.
- In 2017 William A. Navas Jr. was inducted to the Puerto Rico Veterans Hall of Fame.

== Effective dates of promotions ==
Insignia	Rank	Date
	Major general	November 1, 1990
	Brigadier general	October 16, 1987
	Colonel	July 23, 1981
	Lieutenant colonel	October 13, 1976
	Major	October 2, 1972
	Captain	June 2, 1970
	First lieutenant	April 1, 1967
	Second lieutenant	December 28, 1965

== See also ==
- List of Puerto Ricans
- List of Puerto Rican military personnel
- University of Puerto Rico at Mayaguez people

Government offices
Preceded by Carolyn H. Becraft; Bonnie Morehouse (acting)	Assistant Secretary of the Navy (Manpower and Reserve Affairs); 2001 – 2008	Succeeded by Anita K. Blair (acting)
