= Barbara Olson =

American lawyer (1955–2001)

- Born: Barbara Kay Bracher; December 27, 1955; Houston, Texas, U.S.
- Died: September 11, 2001 (aged 45); Arlington County, Virginia, U.S.
- Cause of death: Terrorist attack against the Pentagon
- Education: University of Saint Thomas (BA); Benjamin N. Cardozo School of Law (JD)
- Occupations: Political commentator; lawyer
- Years active: 1990–2001
- Political party: Republican
- Spouse: Theodore Olson (m. 1996)

Barbara Kay Olson (née Bracher; December 27, 1955 – September 11, 2001) was an American lawyer and conservative television commentator who worked for CNN, Fox News Channel, and several other outlets. She was a passenger on American Airlines Flight 77 en route to a taping of Bill Maher's television show Politically Incorrect when it was flown into the Pentagon in the September 11 attacks.

== Early life ==
Olson was born Barbara Kay Bracher in Houston, Texas, on December 27, 1955. Her older sister, Toni Bracher-Lawrence, was a member of the Houston City Council from 2004 to 2010. She graduated from Waltrip High School.

== Personal life ==
She married Theodore Olson in 1996, becoming his third wife.

Olson was a frequent critic of the Bill Clinton administration and wrote a book about then–First Lady Hillary Clinton, Hell to Pay: The Unfolding Story of Hillary Rodham Clinton (1999). Olson's second book, The Final Days: The Last, Desperate Abuses of Power by the Clinton White House was published posthumously.

== Death and legacy ==
Olson was a passenger on American Airlines Flight 77, on her way to a taping of Politically Incorrect in Los Angeles, when it was flown into the Pentagon in the September 11 attacks.

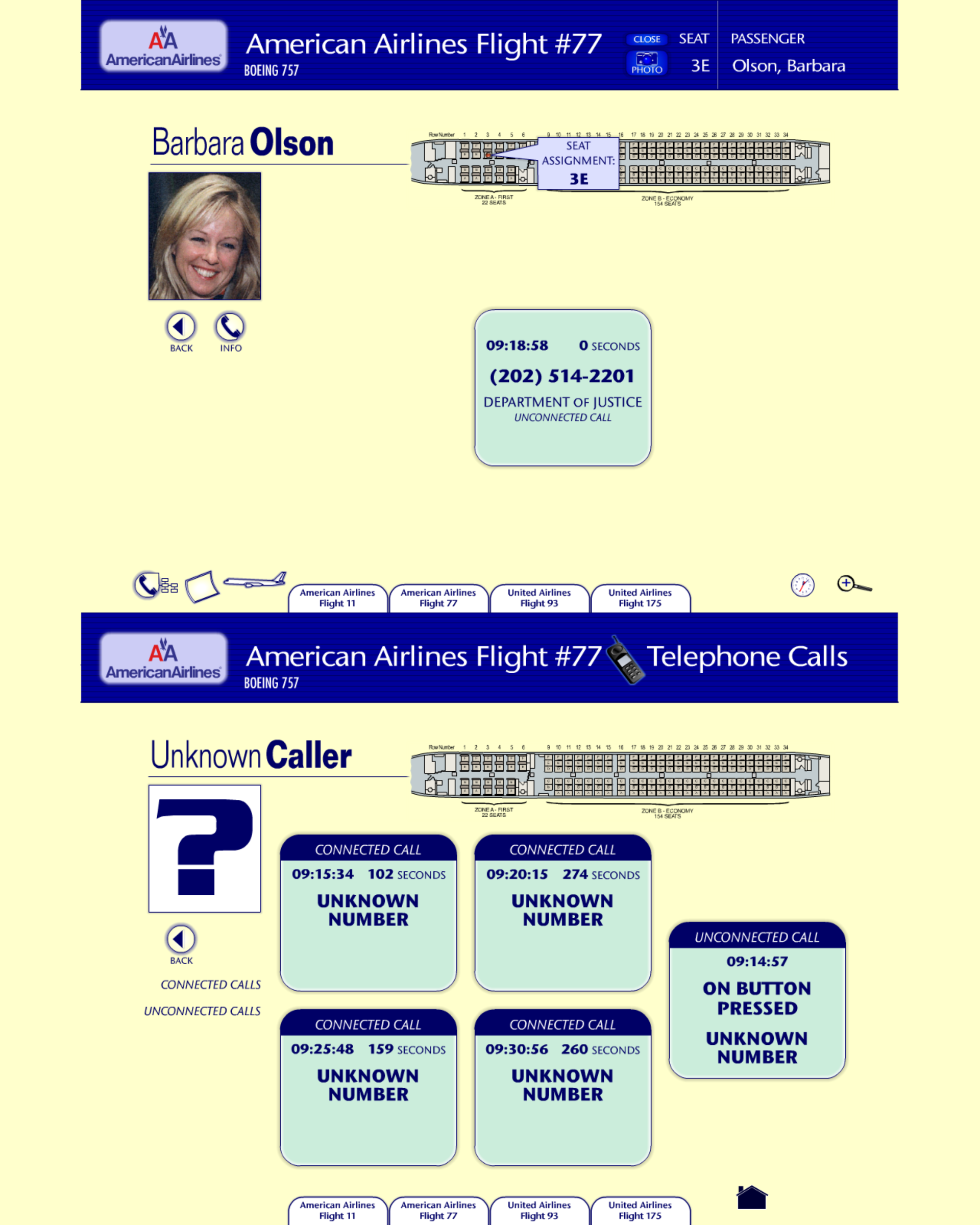
Phone call details

Her original plan had been to fly to California on September 10, but she waited until the next day so that she could wake up with her husband on his birthday, September 11. At some point after the hijacking of Flight 77, Olson called her husband via the airphone, and at one point asked, "What do I tell the pilot to do?" suggesting that pilot Charles Burlingame was next to her at the back of the aircraft.

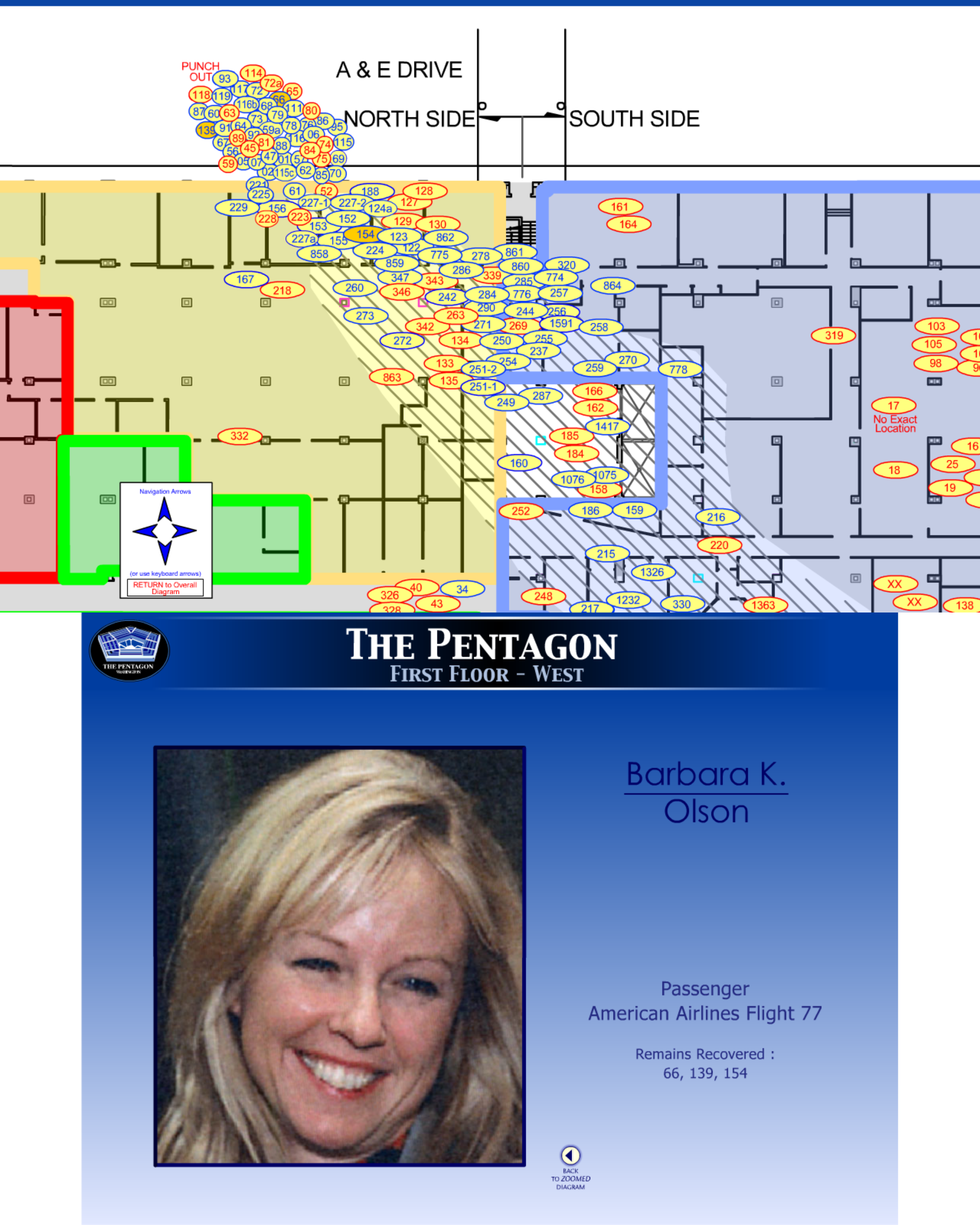
Information about the recovery of Olson's remains (66, 139, and 154)

Three months after the attacks, Olson's remains were identified. She was buried at her family's retreat in Wisconsin. At the National September 11 Memorial, Olson's name is located on Panel S-70 of the South Pool, along with those of other passengers of Flight 77.

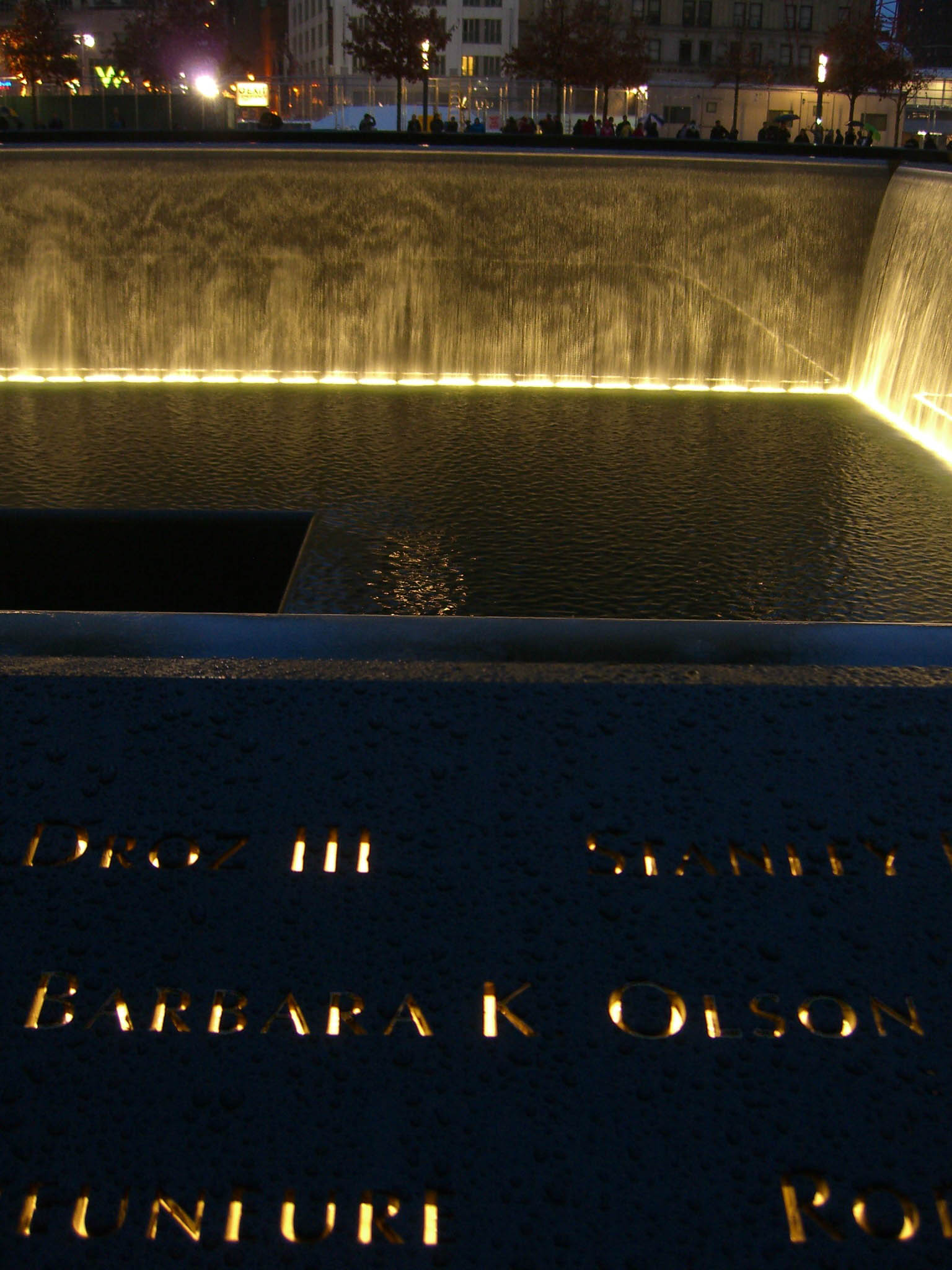
Olson's name on Panel S-70 of the National September 11 Memorial’s South Pool, with other passengers of Flight 77.

Since November 2001, the Federalist Society has given a lecture honoring her at their annual National Lawyers Convention.

== In popular culture ==
- Canadian actress Marsha Mason portrayed Barbara Olson in the Canadian TV series Mayday Season 16: Episode 2 (2016) called "9/11: The Pentagon Attack" and Air Crash Investigation Special Report Season 2: Episode 1 (2019) called "Headline News".

== Books ==
- Olson, Barbara (November 1999). Hell to Pay: The Unfolding Story of Hillary Rodham Clinton. Regnery Pub. ISBN 0-89526-274-6.
- Olson, Barbara (October 2001). The Final Days: The Last, Desperate Abuses of Power by the Clinton White House. Regnery Pub. ISBN 0-89526-167-7.
