= Vice Chief of Staff of the United States Air Force =

Second-highest-ranking military officer in the United States Air Force

Vice Chief of Staff of the Air Force
- Headquarters Air Force identification badge

- Flag of the vice chief of staff of the Air Force

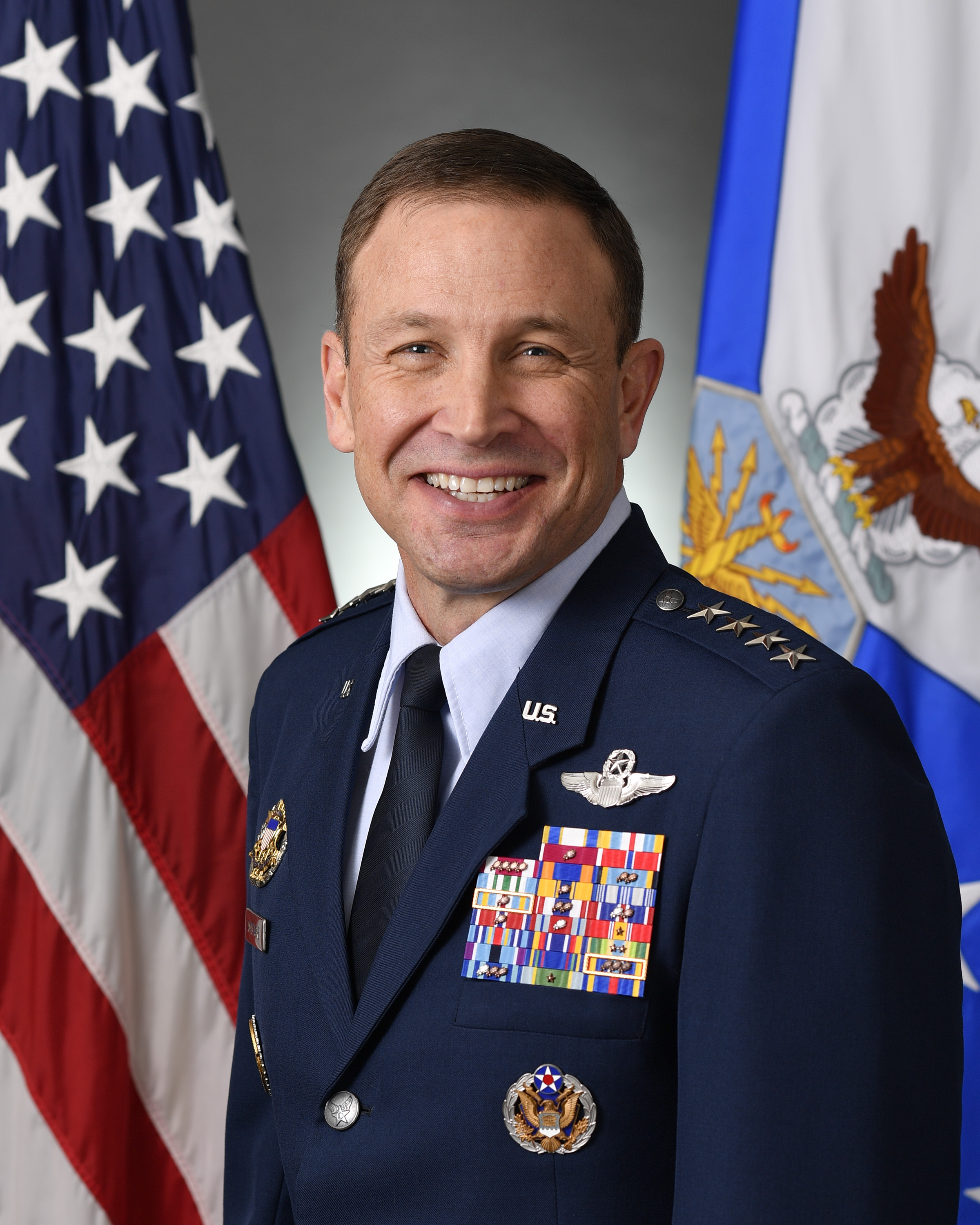
- Incumbent; General John Lamontagne since 9 February 2026
- United States Air Force; Air Staff
- Abbreviation: VCSAF
- Reports to: Secretary of the Air Force; Chief of Staff of the Air Force
- Seat: The Pentagon, Arlington County, Virginia, United States
- Appointer: The president; with Senate advice and consent
- Term length: 4 years fixed term
- Constituting instrument: 10 U.S.C. § 8034
- Formation: 1 October 1947
- First holder: Hoyt Vandenberg

The vice chief of staff of the Air Force (VCSAF) is the second-highest-ranking military officer in the United States Air Force. If the chief of staff of the Air Force (CSAF) is absent or is unable to perform his duties, then the VCSAF assumes the duties and responsibilities of the CSAF. The VCSAF may also perform other duties that the secretary of defense (SECDEF), the secretary of the Air Force (SECAF) or the CSAF assigns to him. The VCSAF is appointed by the president of the United States and must be confirmed via majority vote by the Senate. By statute, the VCSAF is appointed as a four-star general.

As of 9 February 2026, the 42nd vice chief of staff of the Air Force is General John Lamontagne.

== List of vice chiefs of staff of the Air Force ==
No.	Vice Chief of Staff		Term			Chief of Staff
No.	Portrait	Name	Took office	Left office	Term length	Chief of Staff
1	Hoyt S. Vandenberg	General; Hoyt S. Vandenberg (1899–1954)	10 October 1947	28 April 1948 (became CSAF)	201 days	Carl Spaatz
2	Muir S. Fairchild	General; Muir S. Fairchild (1894–1950)	27 May 1948	17 March 1950 †	1 year, 294 days	Hoyt Vandenberg
-	Lauris Norstad	General; Lauris Norstad (1907–1988); Acting	2 May 1950	9 October 1950	160 days	Hoyt Vandenberg
3	Nathan F. Twining	General; Nathan F. Twining (1897–1982)	10 October 1950	29 June 1953 (became CSAF)	2 years, 262 days	Hoyt Vandenberg
4	Thomas D. White	General; Thomas D. White (1901–1965)	30 June 1953	30 June 1957 (became CSAF)	4 years, 0 days	Nathan F. Twining
5	Curtis E. LeMay	General; Curtis E. LeMay (1906–1990)	1 July 1957	30 June 1961 (became CSAF)	3 years, 364 days	Thomas D. White
6	Frederic H. Smith Jr.	General; Frederic H. Smith Jr. (1908–1980)	1 July 1961	30 June 1962 (retired)	364 days	Curtis LeMay
7	William F. McKee	General; William F. McKee (1906–1987)	1 July 1962	31 July 1964 (retired)	2 years, 30 days	Curtis LeMay
8	John P. McConnell	General; John P. McConnell (1908–1986)	1 August 1964	31 January 1965 (became CSAF)	183 days	Curtis LeMay
9	William H. Blanchard	General; William H. Blanchard (1916–1966)	19 February 1965	31 May 1966 †	1 year, 101 days	John P. McConnell
-	Hewitt T. Wheless	Lieutenant General; Hewitt T. Wheless (1913–1986); Acting	13 June 1966	31 July 1966	48 days	John P. McConnell
10	Bruce K. Holloway	General; Bruce K. Holloway (1912–1999)	1 August 1966	31 July 1968 (reassigned)	1 year, 365 days	John P. McConnell
11	John D. Ryan	General; John D. Ryan (1915–1983)	1 August 1968	31 July 1969 (became CSAF)	364 days	John P. McConnell
12	John C. Meyer	General; John C. Meyer (1919–1975)	1 August 1969	30 April 1972 (reassigned)	2 years, 273 days	John D. Ryan
13	Horace M. Wade	General; Horace M. Wade (1916–2001)	1 May 1972	31 October 1973 (reassigned)	1 year, 183 days	John D. Ryan; George S. Brown
14	Richard H. Ellis	General; Richard H. Ellis (1919–1989)	1 November 1973	18 August 1975 (reassigned)	1 year, 290 days	George S. Brown; David C. Jones
15	William V. McBride	General; William V. McBride (1922–2022)	19 August 1975	31 March 1978 (retired)	2 years, 224 days	David C. Jones
16	Lew Allen Jr.	General; Lew Allen Jr. (1925–2010)	1 April 1978	30 June 1978 (became CSAF)	90 days	David C. Jones
17	James A. Hill	General; James A. Hill (1923–2010)	1 July 1978	29 February 1980 (retired)	1 year, 243 days	Lew Allen
18	Robert C. Mathis	General; Robert C. Mathis (1927–2016)	1 March 1980	31 May 1982 (retired)	2 years, 91 days	Lew Allen
19	Jerome F. O'Malley	General; Jerome F. O'Malley (1932–1985)	1 June 1982	5 October 1983 (reassigned)	1 year, 126 days	Lew Allen; Charles A. Gabriel
20	Lawrence A. Skantze	General; Lawrence A. Skantze (1928–2018)	6 October 1983	31 July 1984 (reassigned)	299 days	Charles A. Gabriel
21	Larry D. Welch	General; Larry D. Welch (born 1934)	1 August 1984	31 July 1985 (reassigned)	364 days	Charles A. Gabriel
22	John L. Piotrowski	General; John L. Piotrowski (born 1934)	1 August 1985	31 January 1987 (reassigned)	1 year, 183 days	Charles A. Gabriel; Larry D. Welch
23	Monroe W. Hatch Jr.	General; Monroe W. Hatch Jr. (born 1933)	1 February 1987	1 June 1990 (retired)	3 years, 120 days	Larry D. Welch
24	John M. Loh	General; John M. Loh (born 1938)	4 June 1990	1 April 1991 (reassigned)	301 days	Larry D. Welch; Michael Dugan; Merrill McPeak
25	Michael P. C. Carns	General; Michael P. C. Carns (1937–2023)	16 May 1991	28 July 1994 (retired)	3 years, 73 days	Merrill McPeak
26	Thomas S. Moorman Jr.	General; Thomas S. Moorman Jr. (1940–2020)	29 July 1994	11 July 1997 (retired)	2 years, 347 days	Merrill McPeak; Ronald Fogleman
27	Ralph E. Eberhart	General; Ralph E. Eberhart (born 1946)	11 July 1997	26 May 1999 (reassigned)	1 year, 319 days	Ronald Fogleman; Michael E. Ryan
28	Lester L. Lyles	General; Lester L. Lyles (born 1946)	27 May 1999	17 April 2000 (reassigned)	326 days	Michael E. Ryan
29	John W. Handy	General; John W. Handy (born 1944)	17 April 2000	5 November 2001 (reassigned)	1 year, 202 days	Michael E. Ryan; John P. Jumper
30	Robert H. Foglesong	General; Robert H. Foglesong (born 1945)	5 November 2001	11 August 2003 (reassigned)	1 year, 279 days	John P. Jumper
31	T. Michael Moseley	General; T. Michael Moseley (born 1949)	12 August 2003	2 September 2005 (became CSAF)	2 years, 21 days	John P. Jumper
32	John D. W. Corley	General; John D. W. Corley (born 1951)	2 September 2005	17 September 2007 (reassigned)	2 years, 15 days	T. Michael Moseley
33	Duncan J. McNabb	General; Duncan J. McNabb (born 1952)	17 September 2007	4 September 2008 (reassigned)	353 days	T. Michael Moseley; Norton A. Schwartz
34	William M. Fraser III	General; William M. Fraser III (born 1952)	8 October 2008	27 August 2009 (reassigned)	322 days	Norton A. Schwartz
35	Carrol H. Chandler	General; Carrol H. Chandler (born 1952)	27 August 2009	14 January 2011 (retired)	1 year, 140 days	Norton A. Schwartz
36	Philip M. Breedlove	General; Philip M. Breedlove (born 1955)	14 January 2011	27 July 2012 (reassigned)	1 year, 195 days	Norton A. Schwartz
37	Larry O. Spencer	General; Larry O. Spencer (born 1954)	27 July 2012	6 August 2015 (retired)	3 years, 10 days	Norton A. Schwartz; Mark Welsh
38	David L. Goldfein	General; David L. Goldfein (born 1959)	6 August 2015	1 July 2016 (became CSAF)	330 days	Mark Welsh
39	Stephen W. Wilson	General; Stephen W. Wilson (born 1959/1960)	22 July 2016	16 November 2020 (retired)	4 years, 117 days	David L. Goldfein; Charles Q. Brown Jr.
40	David W. Allvin	General; David W. Allvin (born 1963)	16 November 2020	2 November 2023 (became CSAF)	2 years, 351 days	Charles Q. Brown Jr.
41	James C. Slife	General; James C. Slife (born 1967)	19 December 2023	21 February 2025 (relieved)	1 year, 64 days	David W. Allvin
-	Scott L. Pleus	Lieutenant General; Scott L. Pleus (born 1967); Acting	21 February 2025	9 February 2026	353 days	David W. Allvin; Kenneth S. Wilsbach
42	John D. Lamontagne	General; John D. Lamontagne (born c. 1970)	9 February 2026	Incumbent	250 days	Kenneth S. Wilsbach

== See also ==
- Under Secretary of the Air Force
- Chief Master Sergeant of the Air Force
- Director of Staff of the United States Air Force
- Vice Chief of Staff of the Army
- Assistant Commandant of the Marine Corps
- Vice Chief of Naval Operations
- Vice Chief of Space Operations
- Vice Commandant of the Coast Guard
