= Richard H. Ellis =

US Air Force general

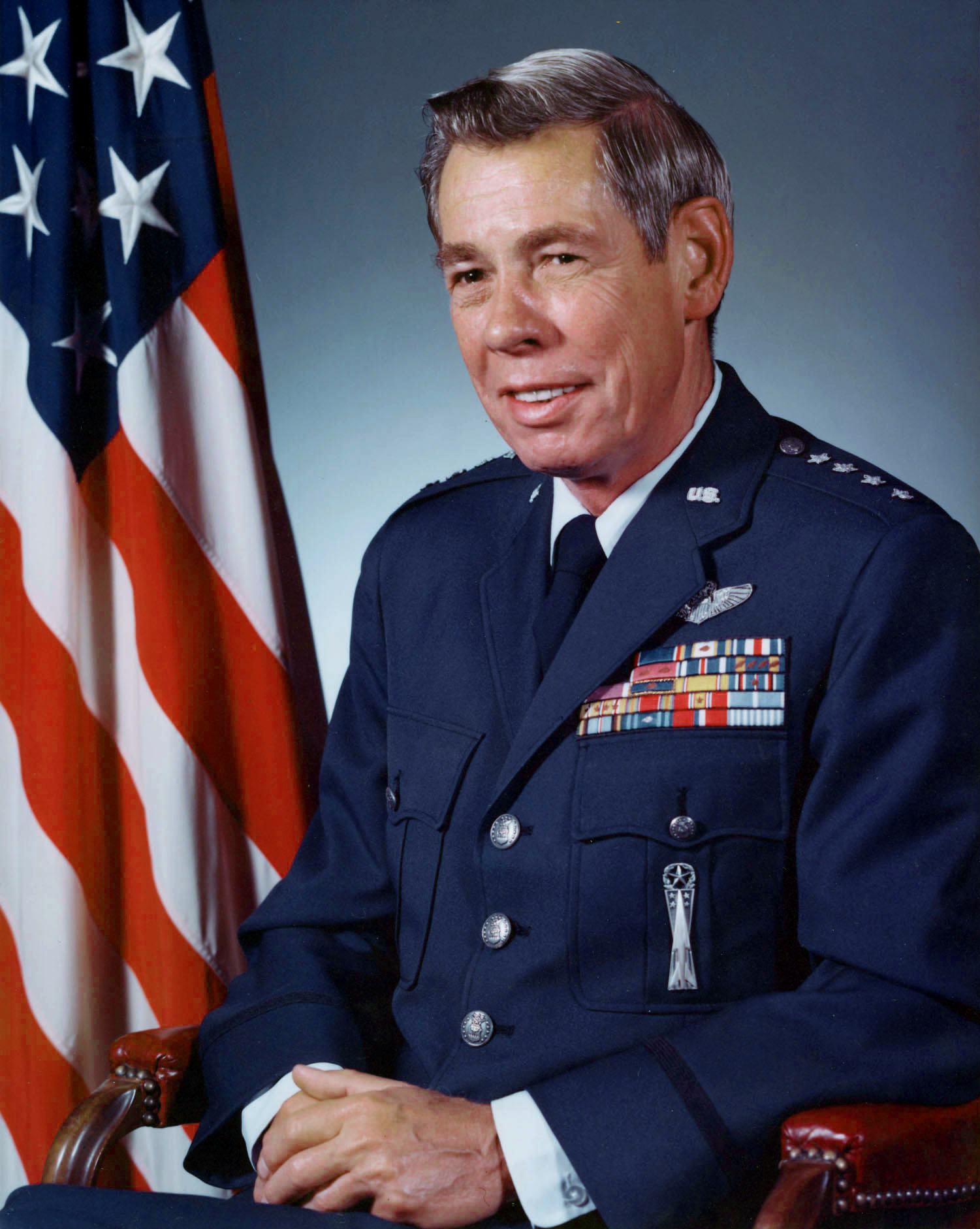
- Ellis as CINCSAC
- Born: July 19, 1919; Laurel, Delaware, U.S.
- Died: March 28, 1989 (aged 69); Andrews AFB, Maryland, U.S.
- Burial place: Arlington National Cemetery, Virginia, U.S.
- Military career
- Allegiance: United States
- Branch: United States Air Force
- Service years: 1941–1981
- Rank: General
- Commands: Strategic Air Command; Allied Air Forces Central Europe; U.S. Air Forces in Europe; 16th Air Force; 9th Air Force
- Conflicts: World War II
- Awards: Distinguished Service Cross; Defense Distinguished Service Medal; Air Force Distinguished Service Medal (4); Silver Star; Legion of Merit (3); Distinguished Flying Cross; Air Medal (5); Purple Heart

Richard Hastings Ellis (July 19, 1919 – March 28, 1989) was a United States Air Force general who served as the commander in chief of the Strategic Air Command and director of the Joint Strategic Target Planning Staff with headquarters at Offutt Air Force Base, Nebraska. He was also director of the Joint Strategic Connectivity Staff.

== Biography ==
Born and raised in Laurel, Delaware, Ellis attended Dickinson College in Carlisle, Pennsylvania. He received his Bachelor of Arts degree in history from Dickinson in 1941 and his juris doctor degree from its School of Law in 1949. Ellis was awarded an honorary Doctor of Science degree from Dickinson College in 1961; honorary Doctor of Laws degrees from Dickinson School of Law in 1974, the University of Akron in 1979, and the University of Nebraska, Omaha, in 1981.

Ellis entered active military duty in September 1941 as an aviation cadet at Maxwell Field, Alabama. He received his commission and pilot wings at Turner Field, Georgia, in April 1942.

During World War II, Ellis served with the 3rd Bombardment Group in Australia, New Guinea, and the Philippines, and flew more than 200 combat missions in the Western Pacific area. He served as a pilot, commander of the 90th Bombardment Squadron, group operations officer and, from September 1944, as group commander. In April 1945, Ellis was assigned as deputy chief of staff, United States Far East Air Forces, in the Philippine Islands and Japan.

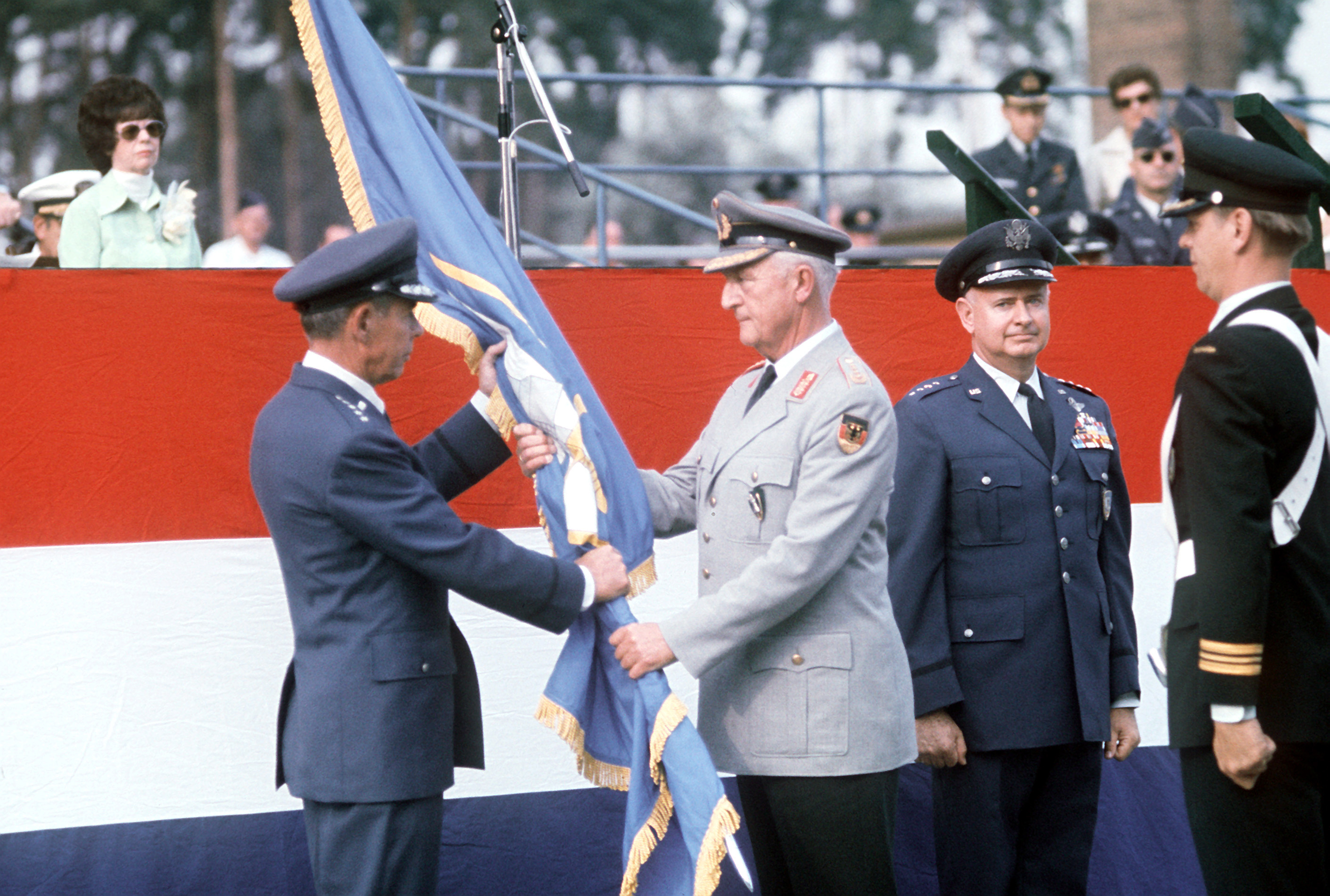
Ellis, incoming commander, receives the NATO flag from GEN Ernst Ferber, German Army, as GEN John W. Vogt, outgoing commander, stands by during the Allied Air Force Central Europe (AAFCE) change of command, 1975

He requested release from active duty, became a member of the Air Force Reserve and entered Dickinson School of Law in 1946. He graduated in 1949 and, after admission to the bar in Delaware, practiced law in Wilmington. Recalled to active duty in October 1950, he was assigned to Headquarters Tactical Air Command, Langley AFB, Virginia; then as deputy for operations, 49th Air Division, Sculthorpe, England; and later as chief, Air Plans and Operations Section, Supreme Headquarters Allied Powers Europe.

From January 1956 to May 1958, Ellis was deputy chief of staff, operations, Headquarters Nineteenth Air Force, Foster AFB, Texas. He was then assigned to the Directorate of Plans, Headquarters U.S. Air Force, Washington, D.C., first as chief, Weapons Plans Branch, then as assistant director of plans for war plans, and later as assistant director of plans, joint matters.

In July 1961, Ellis become executive to the chief of staff, U.S. Air Force. From August 1963 to June 1965, he commanded the 315th Air Division, Tachikawa Air Base, Japan. He returned to Washington, D.C., and served as deputy director, J-5 (Plans and Policy), with the Joint Staff. In August 1967 he returned to the Air Staff, this time as director of plans. He assumed command of 9th Air Force with headquarters at Shaw AFB, South Carolina, in September 1969.

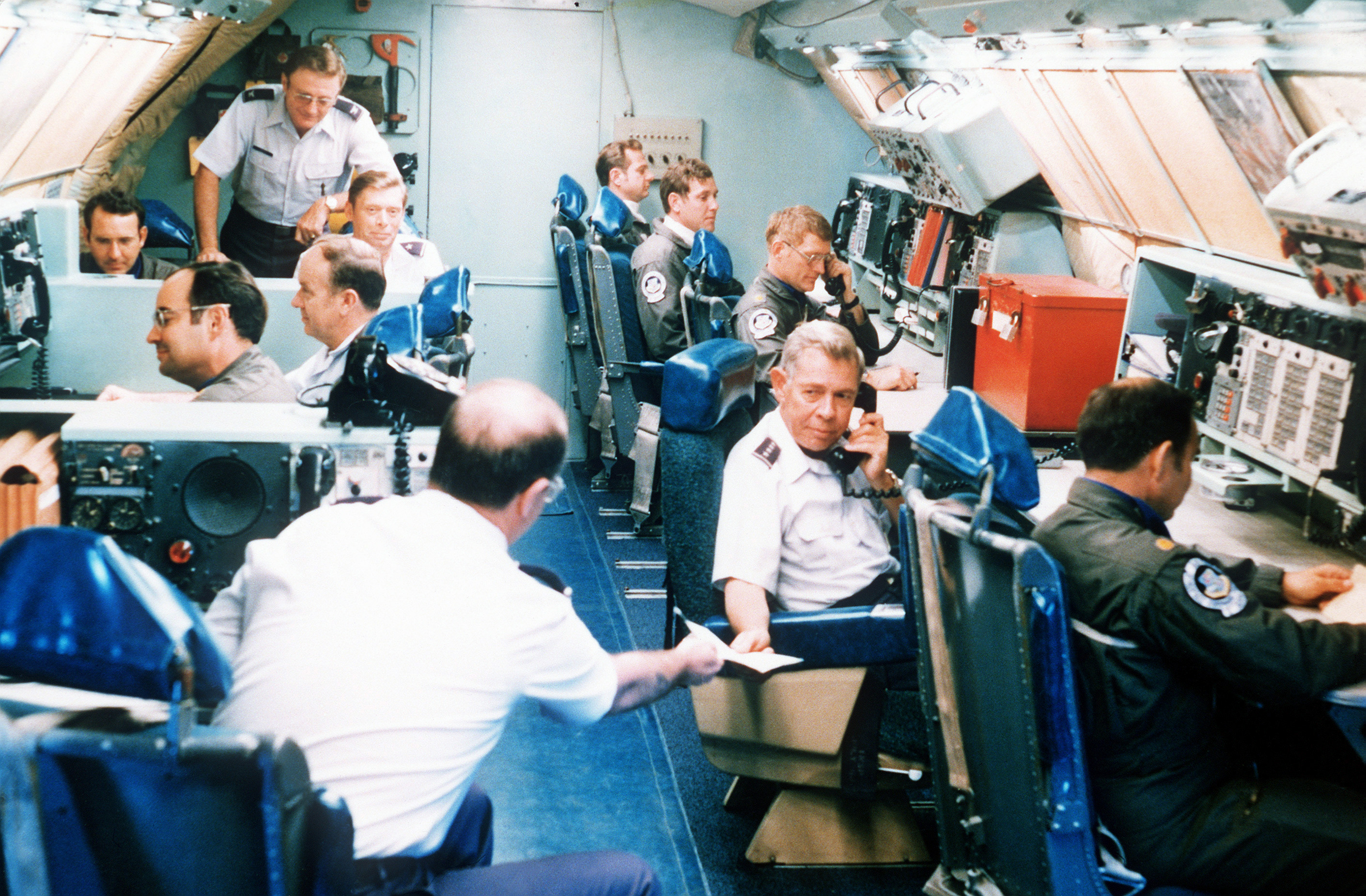
CINCSAC General Ellis on-board SAC's Airborne Command Post, Boeing EC-135 Looking Glass in December 1979

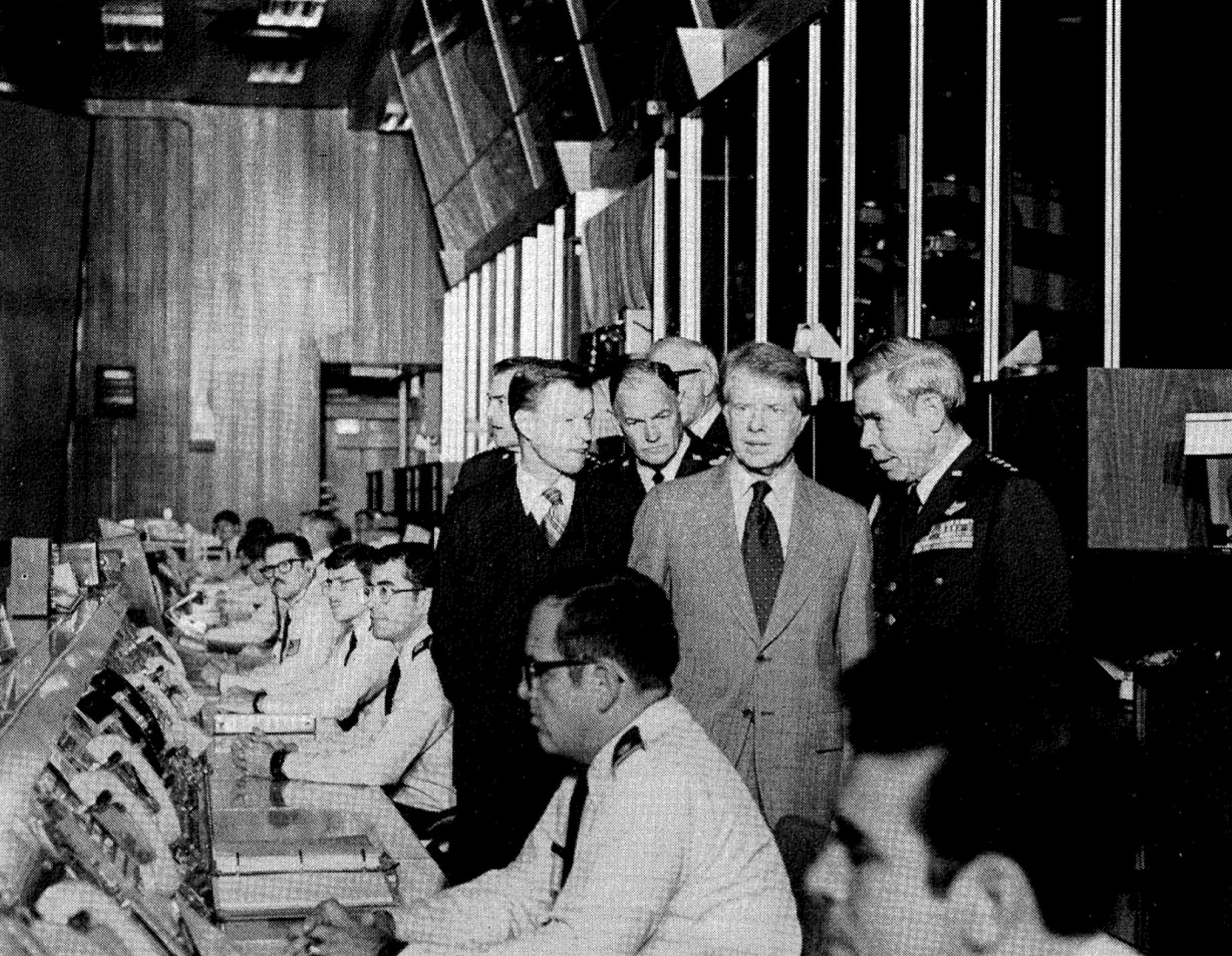
CINCSAC General Ellis accompanying President Jimmy Carter on a tour of SAC HQ at Offutt AFB, Nebraska

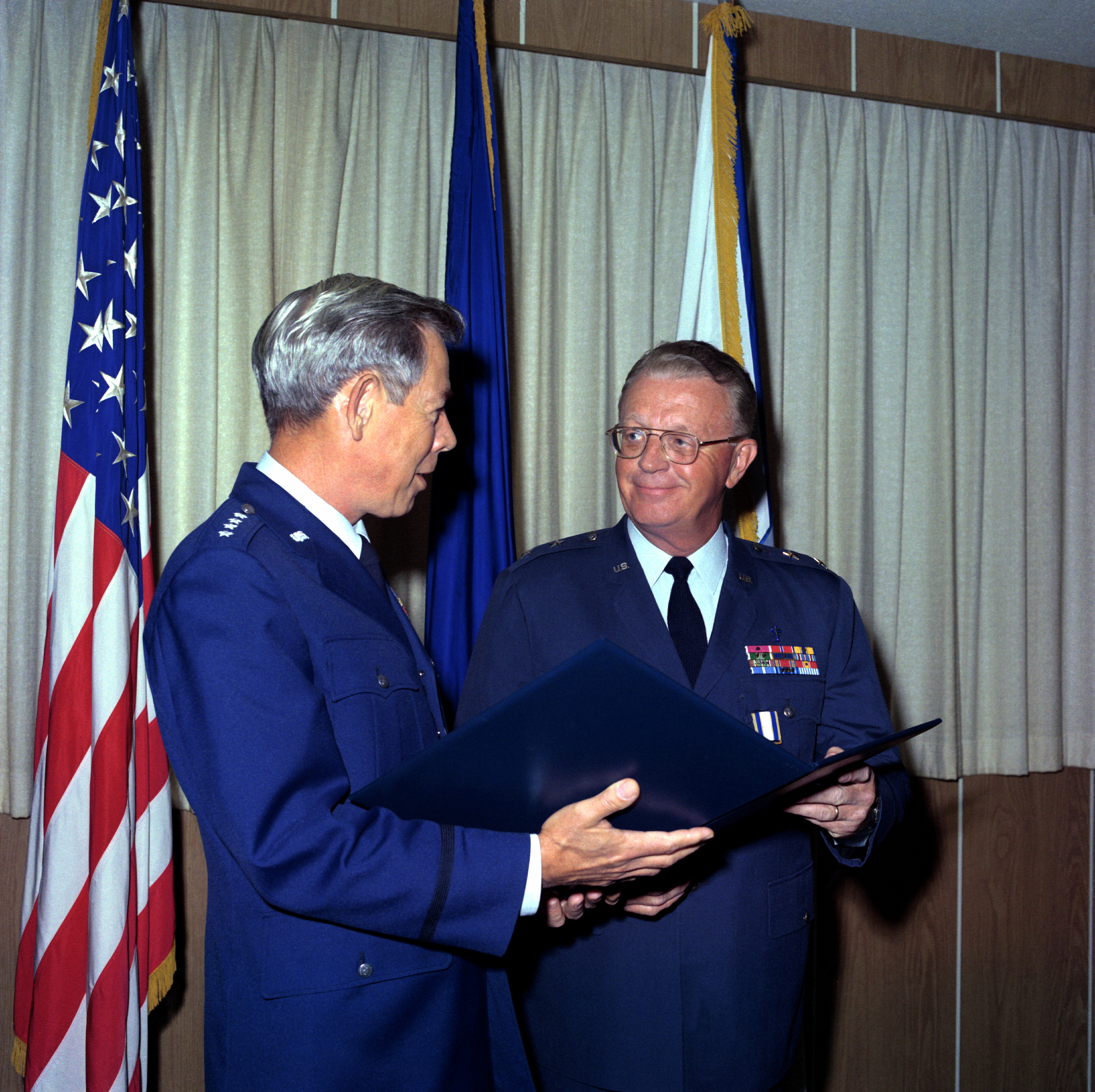
General Ellis presents the Distinguished Service Medal to Maj. Gen. Ray Terry

Ellis was appointed vice commander in chief of U.S. Air Forces in Europe in September 1970, became commander, 6th Allied Tactical Air Force, with headquarters at İzmir, Turkey, in April 1971; and commander of Allied Air Forces, Southern Europe, with headquarters at Naples, Italy, in June 1972. He assumed additional duty as commander, Sixteenth Air Force, Torrejon Air Base, Spain, in May 1973.

He served as Vice Chief of Staff, U.S. Air Force, from November 1973 to August 1975. He was then appointed commander, Allied Air Forces Central Europe, and commander in chief, U.S. Air Forces in Europe. He assumed command of SAC in August 1977. Ellis was promoted to general in 1973 on November 1 (with date of rank September 30), and retired from active duty at age 62 on August 1, 1981.

Ellis died in 1989 at age 69, and was buried at Arlington National Cemetery.

== Effective dates of promotion ==
Insignia	Rank	Date
	General	September 30, 1973
	Lieutenant general	September 1, 1970
	Major general	January 5, 1966
	Brigadier general	August 13, 1962
	Colonel	April 8, 1945
	Lieutenant colonel	July 5, 1944
	Major	January 31, 1944
	Captain	August 9, 1943
	First lieutenant	April 24, 1943
	Second lieutenant	April 29, 1942

== Awards and decorations ==
Ellis was a command pilot and earned the Master Missile and the Parachutist badges. He has been awarded the Distinguished Service Cross, Air Force Distinguished Service Medal with three oak leaf clusters, Silver Star, Legion of Merit with two oak leaf clusters, Distinguished Flying Cross, Air Medal with four oak leaf clusters, Purple Heart and Grand Officer of the Italian Republic. He was awarded the State of Delaware Distinguished Service Medal by Governor Walter W. Bacon in 1946. In September 1980, he was presented the Air Force Association's highest honor, the H.H. Arnold Award for significant contributions to national defense. As the recipient of this award he was also named as the association's National Aerospace Man of the Year. General Ellis received the Korean Order of National Security Merit, First Class (Tong Il Jang) on May 13, 1981, at the Korean Ministry of National Defense in Seoul. This award, the highest honor given by the Republic of Korea to a foreign military leader, was presented to the general for his important contributions to national defense of the Republic of Korea.

USAF Command Pilot Badge
USAF Parachutist Badge
Distinguished Service Cross		Defense Distinguished Service Medal
Air Force Distinguished Service Medal with three bronze oak leaf clusters	Silver Star	Legion of Merit with two bronze oak leaf clusters
Distinguished Flying Cross	Purple Heart	Air Medal with four bronze oak leaf clusters
Air Force Presidential Unit Citation with bronze oak leaf cluster	American Defense Service Medal	American Campaign Medal with bronze campaign star
Asiatic-Pacific Campaign Medal with one silver and three bronze campaign stars	World War II Victory Medal	National Defense Service Medal with service star
Korean Service Medal	Armed Forces Expeditionary Medal	Air Force Longevity Service Award with one silver and three bronze oak leaf clusters
Air Force Longevity Service Award (second ribbon required for accouterment spacing)	State of Delaware Distinguished Service Medal	Grand Officer of the Order of Merit of the Italian Republic
First Class of the South Korean Order of National Security Merit (Tongil Medal)	Philippine Liberation Medal	United Nations Korea Medal

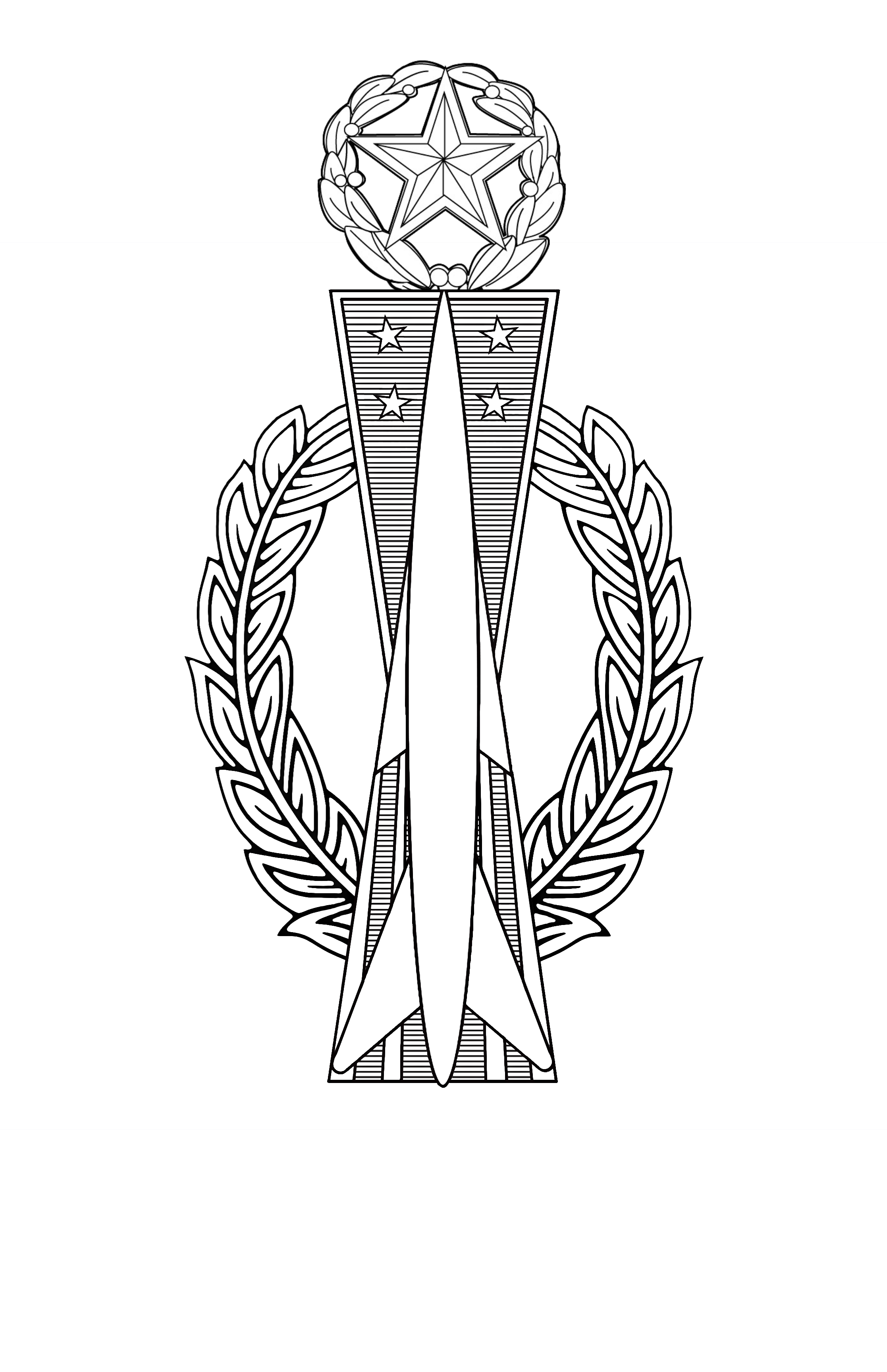

U.S. Air Force Master Missile Operator Badge

=== Distinguished Service Cross citation ===

Ellis, Richard H.
Lieutenant Colonel, U.S. Army Air Forces
3d Bombardment Group, Fifth Air Force
Date of Action: April 5, 1945

Citation:

The President of the United States takes pleasure in presenting the Distinguished Service Cross to Richard Hastings Ellis, Lieutenant Colonel (Air Corps), U.S. Army Air Forces, for extraordinary heroism in connection with military operations against an armed enemy while serving as Pilot of an A-20 Bomber in the 3d Bombardment Group (L), Fifth Air Force, while participating in a bombing mission on 5 April 1945, against enemy surface targets in the Southwest Pacific Area. On that date, Lieutenant Colonel Ellis was the lead pilot of a flight of three A-20 type planes en route to rendezvous with eighteen B-25’s for a strike on an enemy convoy comprising of one transport and five warships. A rendezvous was made with the fighter cover provided, but the B-25’s, unable to locate the convoy, did not appear. Though faced with heavy odds and lacking sufficient planes to keep the warships engaged, Colonel Ellis ordered the attack. Coming in through intense anti-aircraft fire, he flew directly over the leading warship, attacked the transport at minimum altitude, and sank it with two direct hits. During this action his two wingmen attacked and scored a near miss on a flanking vessel. In this flight, possibly the longest ever made by A-20 aircraft, Colonel Ellis accomplished his mission without losses. Through his gallant and intrepid actions in the face of grave danger, he personally sank a vessel carrying troops of the enemy. The gallantry and devotion to duty displayed by Lieutenant Colonel Ellis on this occasion have upheld the highest traditions of the military service and reflect great credit upon himself, the 5th Air Force, and the United States Army Air Forces.

== See also ==
- List of commanders of USAFE

Military offices
Preceded by Russell E. Dougherty	Commander, Strategic Air Command; 1977—1981	Succeeded by Bennie L. Davis
