= Bennie L. Davis =

United States Air Force general

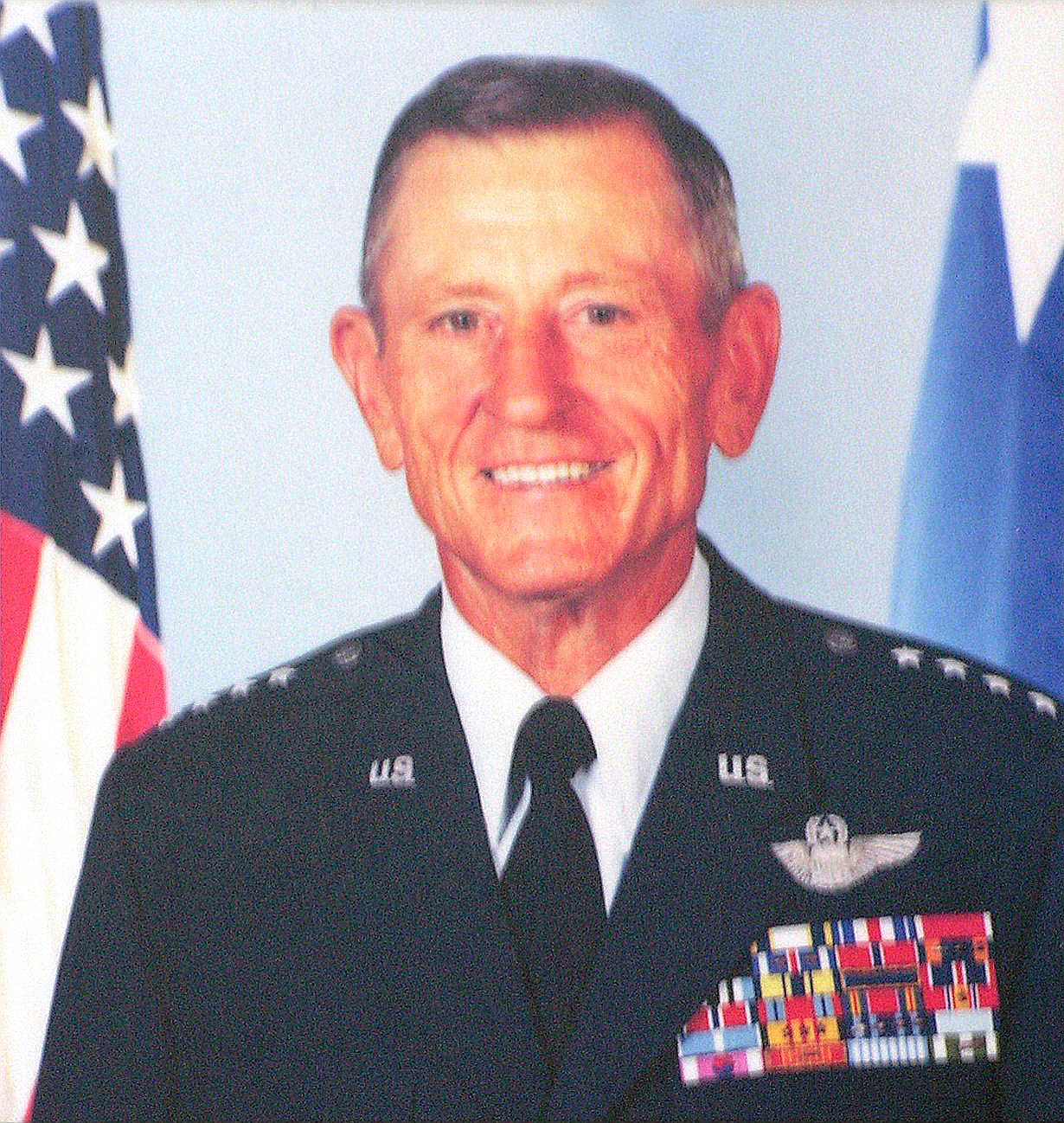
- General Bennie Luke Davis, United States Air Force
- Born: Bennie Luke Davis; May 12, 1928; McAlester, Oklahoma, U.S.
- Died: September 23, 2012 (aged 84); Georgetown, Texas, U.S.
- Burial place: Fort Sam Houston National Cemetery; San Antonio, Texas, U.S.
- Education: United States Military Academy
- Military career
- Allegiance: United States of America
- Branch: United States Air Force
- Service years: 1950–1985
- Rank: General
- Unit: Strategic Air Command Air Training Command Air Staff
- Commands: Strategic Air Command; Air Training Command; Air Force Recruiting Service
- Conflicts: Vietnam War
- Awards: Silver Star; Legion of Merit; Distinguished Flying Cross (3); Bronze Star Medal; Air Medal (8)

Bennie Luke Davis (May 12, 1928 – September 23, 2012) was a United States Air Force General and pilot who served as the commander-in-chief of Strategic Air Command, and the director of Joint Strategic Target Planning Staff at the height of the Cold War. The command was the major American nuclear deterrent force with bombers, tankers, reconnaissance aircraft and intercontinental ballistic missiles. The Joint Strategic Target Planning Staff coordinated and developed the Single Integrated Operational Plan.

A native of rural Oklahoma, Davis attended West Point in New York, his alma mater in the early 1950s and was commissioned a Second Lieutenant, but instead of joining the United States Army, he joined the Air Force and become a career bomber pilot and instructor. Throughout the 1950s, 60s and 70s, he served both in the continental United States and in Southeast Asia, flying combat missions in the Vietnam War during Operation Rolling Thunder. In the late 1960s, he attended the Armed Forces Staff College, served as a staff officer under the Joint Chiefs of Staff and graduated from a course at Harvard Business School, continuing to be elevated to more senior assignments. In 1981, he was appointed Commander-in-Chief of SAC, succeeding General Richard H. Ellis.

One of the most prominent figures in the Air Force in the 1970s and 1980s, he served as a senior Air Force leader during a renewed buildup of the nuclear deterrent initiated by Presidents Jimmy Carter and Ronald Reagan after the end of Détente and the Soviet invasion of Afghanistan in 1979 accelerated. Following the 1980 accident at Titan II missile site 374-7 near Little Rock Air Force Base in rural Arkansas, he was appointed by President Carter to oversee a board that looked into the incident, ultimately leading to the deactivation of the system in 1987. His tenure as CINC, one of the most influential and important positions in the Air Force, including the development of the Rockwell B-1 Lancer, a long-range strategic nuclear bomber, the MIRV-capable MX ICBM, and the modernization of the Minuteman missile force. Throughout the early 1980s, the risk of global nuclear war between the Soviet Union and the United States rose, with both sides employing newer and more accurate weapon systems. Tensions were heightened by the Korean Airliner incident, the invasion of Grenada, and the Able Archer Crisis, which the Soviet Armed Forces and Politburo mistook for a sneak attack by NATO, the most significant 'close call' since the Cuban Missile Crisis of 1962. Davis retired in 1985 as the Cold War began to wind down. He was succeeded by General Larry Welch.

== Early life and education ==
Davis was born in McAlester, Oklahoma on May 12, 1928. He graduated from the United States Military Academy at West Point in 1950 with a commission as a second lieutenant and a bachelor of science degree. He earned a Master of Science degree from The George Washington University, Washington, D.C., in 1967; and graduated from the Armed Forces Staff College, Norfolk, Virginia, in 1964; and the National War College, Fort Lesley J. McNair, Washington, D.C., in 1967.

== Career ==
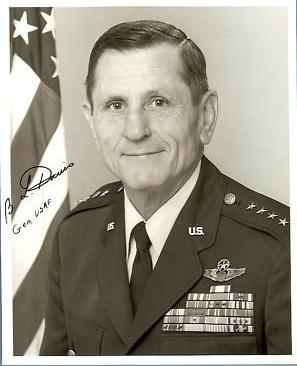
An autographed photograph of Davis during his tenure as a general.

After graduation from West Point, Davis entered the U.S. Air Force and attended pilot training at Vance Air Force Base, Oklahoma, earning his pilot wings in August 1951. He then was assigned as a twin-engine pilot at James Connally Air Force Base, Texas.

Davis completed B-29 Superfortress combat crew training in October 1953 and then reported to Okinawa as a B-29 aircraft commander with the 307th and later the 19th Bombardment Wing. He returned to the United States with the 19th Bombardment Wing in June 1954 and served as a B-47 Stratojet aircraft commander and instructor pilot at Pinecastle Air Force Base, Florida. In June 1956 he again moved with the 19th Bombardment Wing, this time to Homestead Air Force Base, Florida.

After completing B-52 combat crew training in September 1961, Davis become a B-52H instructor pilot with the 93rd Bombardment Squadron at Kincheloe Air Force Base, Michigan. In February 1964 he entered the Armed Forces Staff College. He graduated in June 1964 and was assigned to SAC headquarters at Offutt Air Force Base as a requirements officer in the Aerospace Systems Branch, Plans Requirements Division. General Davis entered the National War College in August 1966 and while attending the college earned a master of science degree.

Davis transferred to Clark Air Base in the Philippines, in October 1967 as a B-57 tactical bomber pilot with the 13th Bombardment Squadron. The squadron was later redesignated as Detachment 1, 8th Tactical Bombardment Squadron, and he became its operations officer. He flew more than 350 combat hours on 142 missions over Vietnam.

In August 1968, Davis joined the Organization of the Joint Chiefs of Staff in Washington, D.C., where he served in the Directorate of Operations as an operations officer and later as chief of the Current Operations Branch, Strategic Operations Division. In August 1970 he was assigned as the Air Force member of the Chairman's Staff Group, Office of the Chairman of the Joint Chiefs of Staff. In 1969, he attended the six-week advanced management program at the Harvard School of Business.

Davis transferred to Randolph Air Force Base, Texas, in June 1972 to serve as vice commander, U.S. Air Force Military Personnel Center, and deputy assistant deputy chief of staff for military personnel for Headquarters U.S. Air Force. The center was later redesignated the Manpower and Personnel Center. In June 1974 he became commander of the U.S. Air Force Recruiting Service and deputy chief of staff, recruiting, for Air Training Command.

In July 1975, Davis was assigned as director, personnel plans, Office of the Deputy Chief of Staff, Personnel, Headquarters U.S. Air Force, Washington, D.C. He was named deputy chief of staff, personnel (later manpower and personnel) in June 1977. In April 1979 Davis was promoted to General, and took command of Air Training Command at Randolph Air Force Base. He assumed command of SAC in August 1981.

== Later life and death ==
Davis retired on August 1, 1985, and died September 23, 2012, of natural causes in Georgetown, Texas, where he had been living since his retirement.

== Awards and decorations ==
US Air Force Command Pilot Badge

Air Force Distinguished Service Medal
Silver Star
Legion of Merit
Distinguished Flying Cross
Bronze Star
Air Medal with seven oak leaf clusters
Joint Service Commendation Medal
Air Force Commendation Medal
Air Force Presidential Unit Citation
Air Force Outstanding Unit Award
Air Force Organizational Excellence Award
Combat Readiness Medal
World War II Victory Medal
National Defense Service Medal with one bronze service star
Korean Service Medal
Vietnam Service Medal with three service stars
Air Force Longevity Service Award with silver and three bronze oak leaf clusters
Vietnam Air Service Medal
Order of National Security Merit, Tong-il Medal (Republic of Korea)
Vietnam Gallantry Cross Unit Citation
United Nations Korea Medal
Vietnam Campaign Medal

Military offices
Preceded by Gen. Richard H. Ellis	Commander, Strategic Air Command; 1981—1985	Succeeded by Larry D. Welch
