= Larry D. Welch =

United States Air Force general

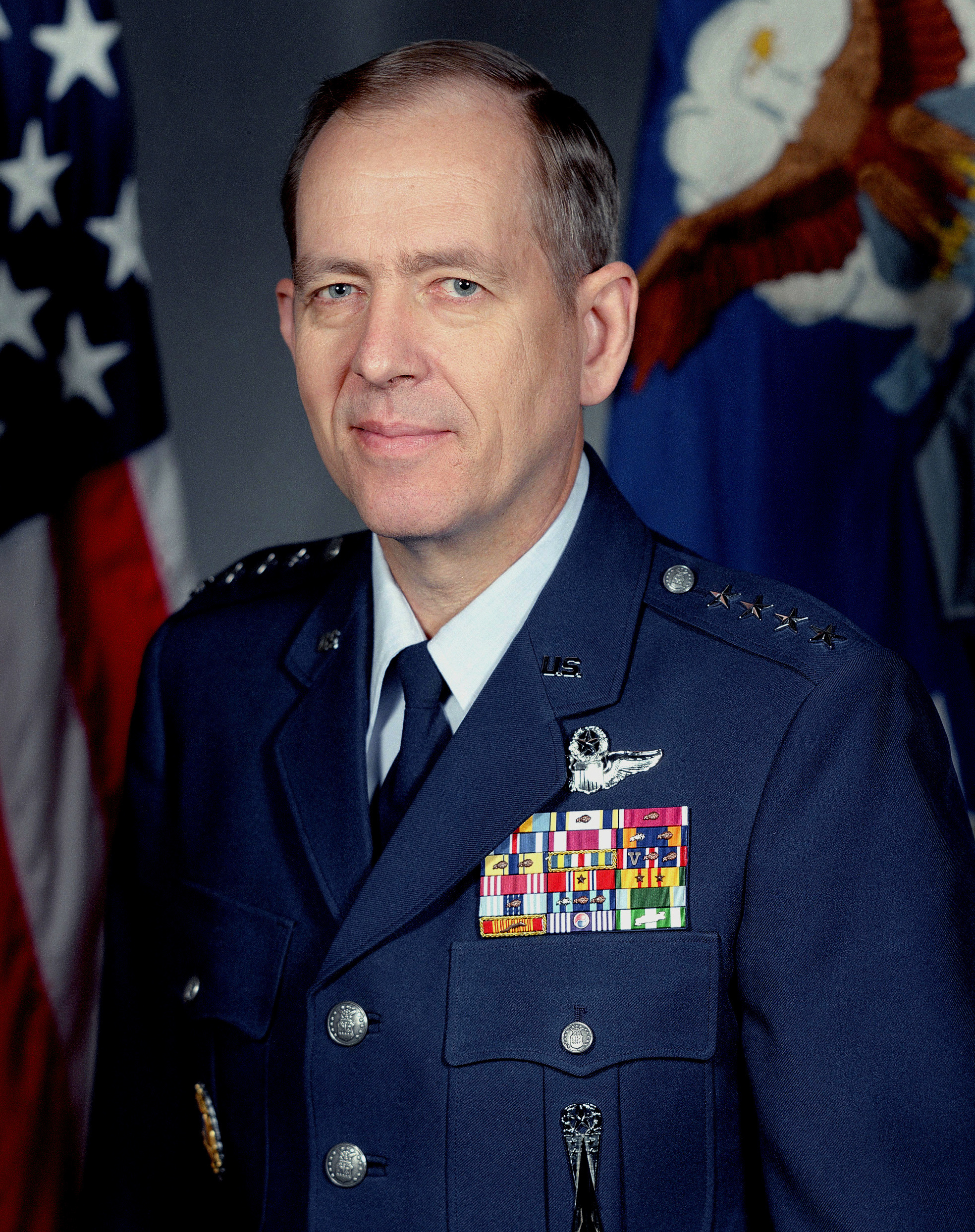
- Official portrait, 1988
- Born: June 9, 1934 (age 92); Guymon, Oklahoma, U.S.
- Military career
- Allegiance: United States
- Branch: United States Air Force
- Service years: 1951–1990
- Rank: General
- Commands: Chief of Staff of the United States Air Force; Strategic Air Command; Vice Chief of Staff of the United States Air Force; Ninth Air Force
- Conflicts: Vietnam War; Cold War
- Awards: Defense Distinguished Service Medal (2); Air Force Distinguished Service Medal (2); Legion of Merit (2); Distinguished Flying Cross; Meritorious Service Medal; Air Medal (7)
- Other work: Rumsfeld Commission; President, Institute for Defense Analyses; Board of Directors, Henry L. Stimson Center

Larry D. Welch (born June 9, 1934) is a retired United States Air Force four-star general who served as the 12th Chief of Staff of the United States Air Force. He currently serves as the chairman of the Nuclear Weapon Surety Task Force for the Defense Science Board.

== Early life and career ==
Welch was born in Guymon, Oklahoma, and graduated from Liberal (Kansas) High School in 1952. He received a Bachelor of Arts degree in business administration from the University of Maryland, College Park and a Master of Science degree in international relations from The George Washington University, Washington, D.C. Welch completed Armed Forces Staff College at Norfolk, Virginia, in 1967, and National War College at Fort Lesley J. McNair, Washington, D.C., in 1972. Welch is an Eagle Scout and recipient of the Distinguished Eagle Scout Award.

Welch enlisted in the Kansas National Guard in October 1951, serving with the 161st Armored Field Artillery until he enlisted in the United States Air Force. In November 1953, he entered the aviation cadet program and received his pilot wings and commission as a second lieutenant. He served initially as a flight instructor until his assignment in July 1958, to Headquarters Air Training Command, Randolph Air Force Base, Texas.

== Military career ==
Welch then served in tactical fighter units in Europe, the continental United States and Alaska before transferring to the Republic of Vietnam where he flew combat missions in F-4C Phantom IIs over North and South Vietnam, and Laos.

After completing the Armed Forces Staff College in July 1967, Welch was assigned to Headquarters U.S. Air Force, Washington, D.C., under the assistant chief of staff for studies and analysis. Upon graduation from the National War College in July 1972, he was assigned to Tactical Air Command, where he served in wing deputy commander for operations, vice commander and wing commander positions.

In August 1977, he transferred to Headquarters Tactical Air Command where he served as inspector general, deputy chief of staff for plans and deputy chief of staff for operations. In June 1981, he became commander of the Ninth Air Force and Air Force component commander for the Rapid Deployment Joint Task Force. In November 1982, he was assigned as deputy chief of staff for programs and resources at Air Force headquarters and became Vice Chief of Staff of the United States Air Force in July 1984.

== Commander of Strategic Air Command ==
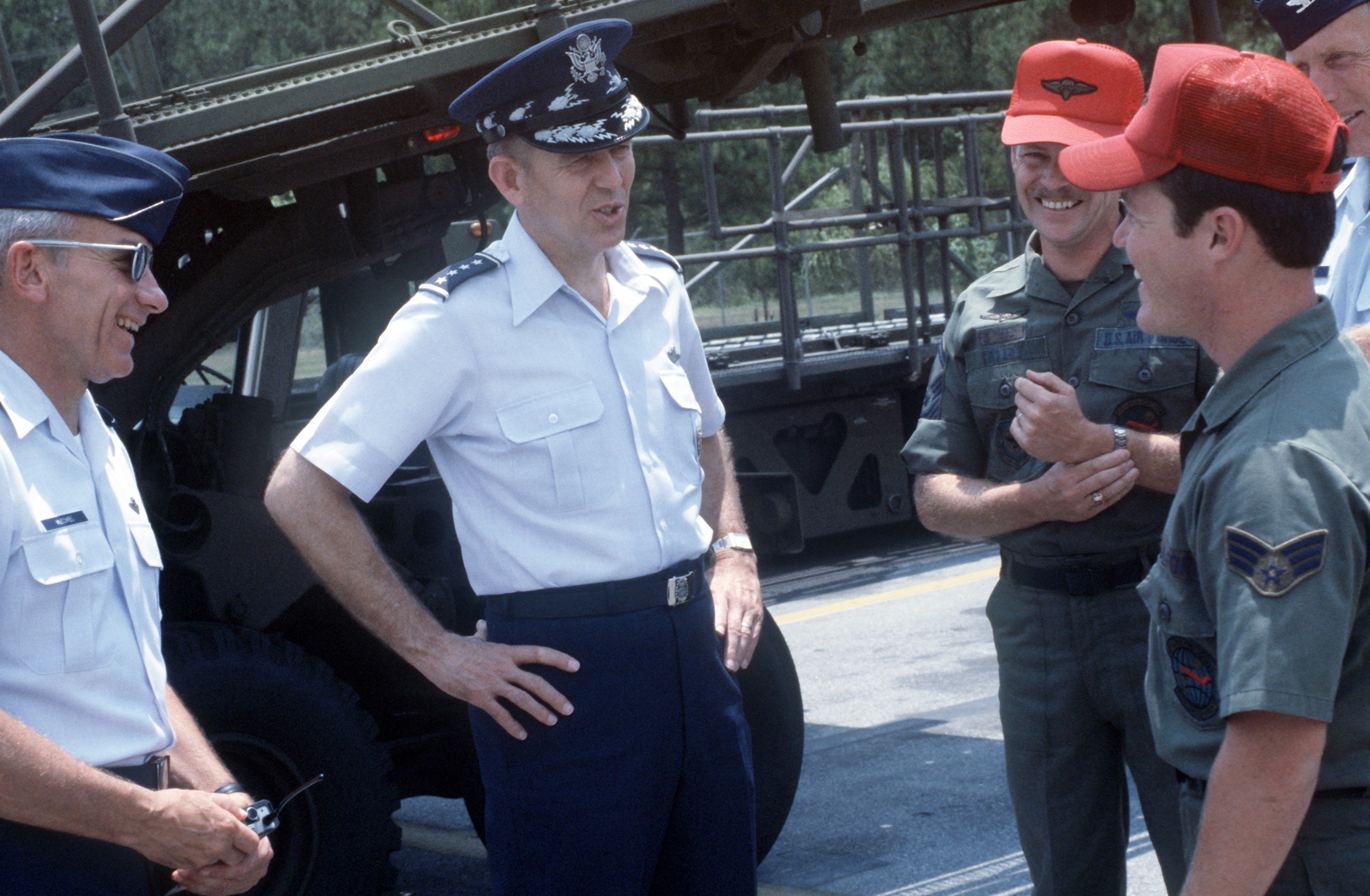
CINCSAC General Larry D. Welch during a visit to Barksdale Air Force Base, Louisiana.

On August 1, 1985, General Welch was appointed as the new Commander-in-Chief of the Strategic Air Command, succeeding the retiring General Bennie L. Davis. From August 1985 to June 1986, Welch served as commander in chief, Strategic Air Command, and director, Joint Strategic Target Planning Staff, Offutt Air Force Base, Nebraska. In this capacity, Welch oversaw all of the United States Nuclear Triad operations, which included fleet of Strategic Bombers Aircraft and fleet of Ballistic Missile such as the Intercontinental-Ballistic missiles.

During Welch tenure as Commanders of the Strategic Air Command, Welch oversaw the transition of a new Air Force Strategic Bombers Aircraft, the B-1B Lancer which began its service within the United States Air Force on 1986. Welch himself also tested the B-1B aircraft by flying the aircraft himself for the test-flight. Welch also emphasize about the need to modernized United States Air Force fleet of Strategic Bombers Aircraft, such as the Boeing B-52 Stratofortress which has become the backbone of the United States Air Force Strategic Bombers Aircraft need to be modified with the new equipment so it would be able to serve within the United States Air Force for the next fifty years and also the need of a new advance stealth bombers aircraft. As a result, the Air Force began the new B-2 bomber project aircraft which gave birth to the new advance stealth Bomber Aircraft, the Northrop Grumman B-2 Spirit. President Reagan praised Welch for his achievement as Commander of The Strategic Air Command in shaping and modernizing the Strategic Air Command.

== Air Force Chief of Staff ==
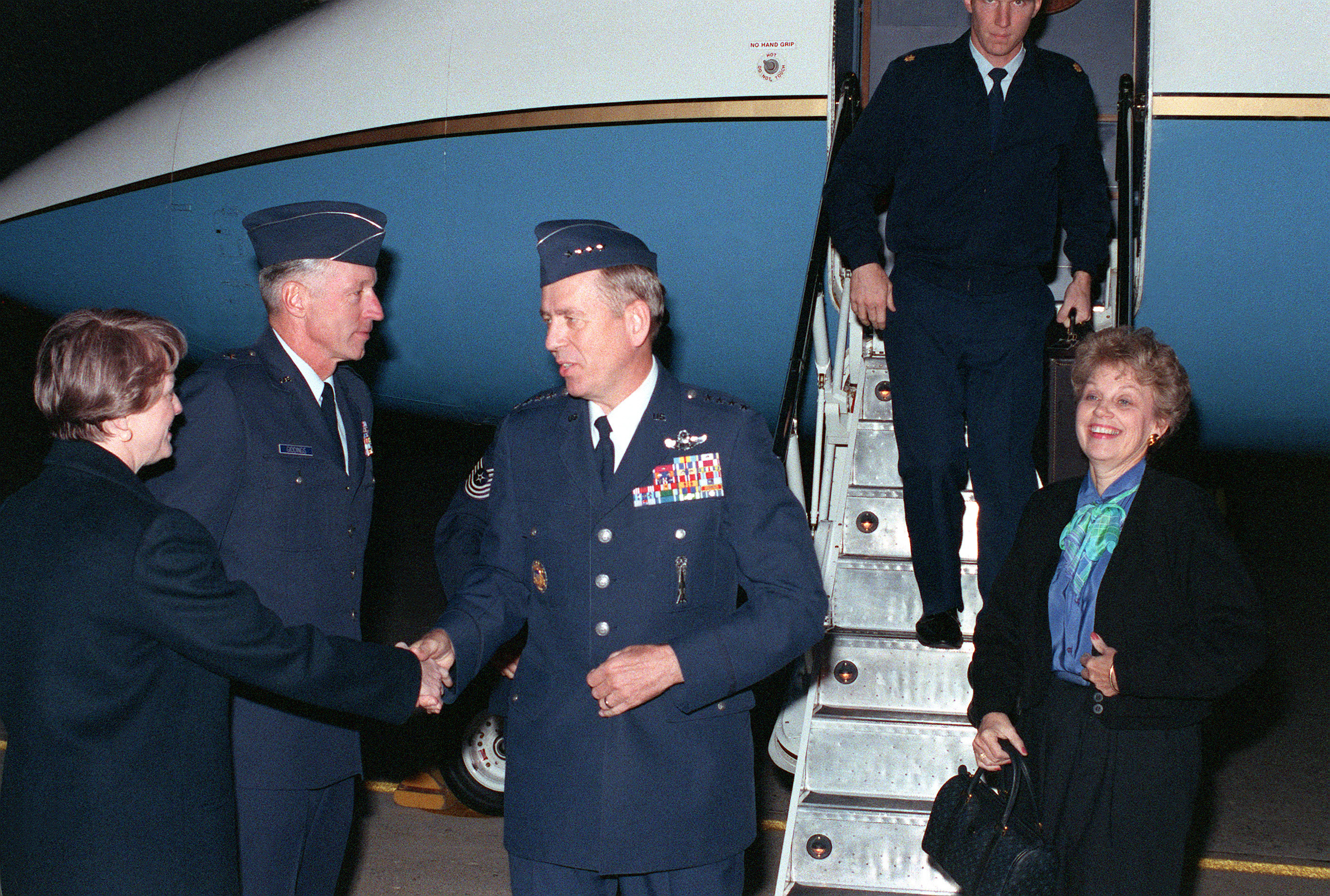
Air Force Chief of Staff General Larry D. Welch at Andrews Air Force Base.

In 1986 Welch was appointed by President Ronald Reagan to become the new Air Force Chief of Staff, succeeding the retiring General Charles A. Gabriel. Welch assumed the position of Chief of Staff of the United States Air Force on July 1, 1986. Welch is one of only a handful of modern service chiefs to have risen from enlisted rank to his service's highest position (the others being Marine Corps General Alfred Gray, Army General John Shalikashvili and Navy Admiral Jeremy Boorda).

As Air Force Chief of Staff Welch oversaw all of the United States Air Force operation within the United States and Worldwide and in his capacity as Air Force Chief of Staff Welch was also the most senior uniformed Air Force officer responsible for organizing, training and equipping all of the active-duty Air Force officers, Air National Guard and Air Force Reserve. As Air Force Chief of Staff, Welch also become a member of the Joint Chiefs of Staff, which has primary tasked to advise The President, Secretary of Defense and National Security Council regarding Air Force matters.

During his tenure as Air Force Chief of Staff, Welch oversaw the transition of the United States Air Force operations following the Intermediate-Range Nuclear Forces Treaty which led to the end of the Cold War. Welch emphasize that although the Cold War has already relieve, but the United States Air Force strength has to be maintain in-order to face another possible threat by new adversary in the future. During his tenure as Air Force Chief of Staff Welch also oversaw the entering of the United States Air Force new Strategic Bombers Aircraft, the B-1B Lancer in-which Welch has tested it during Welch tenure as Commanders of Strategic Air Command.

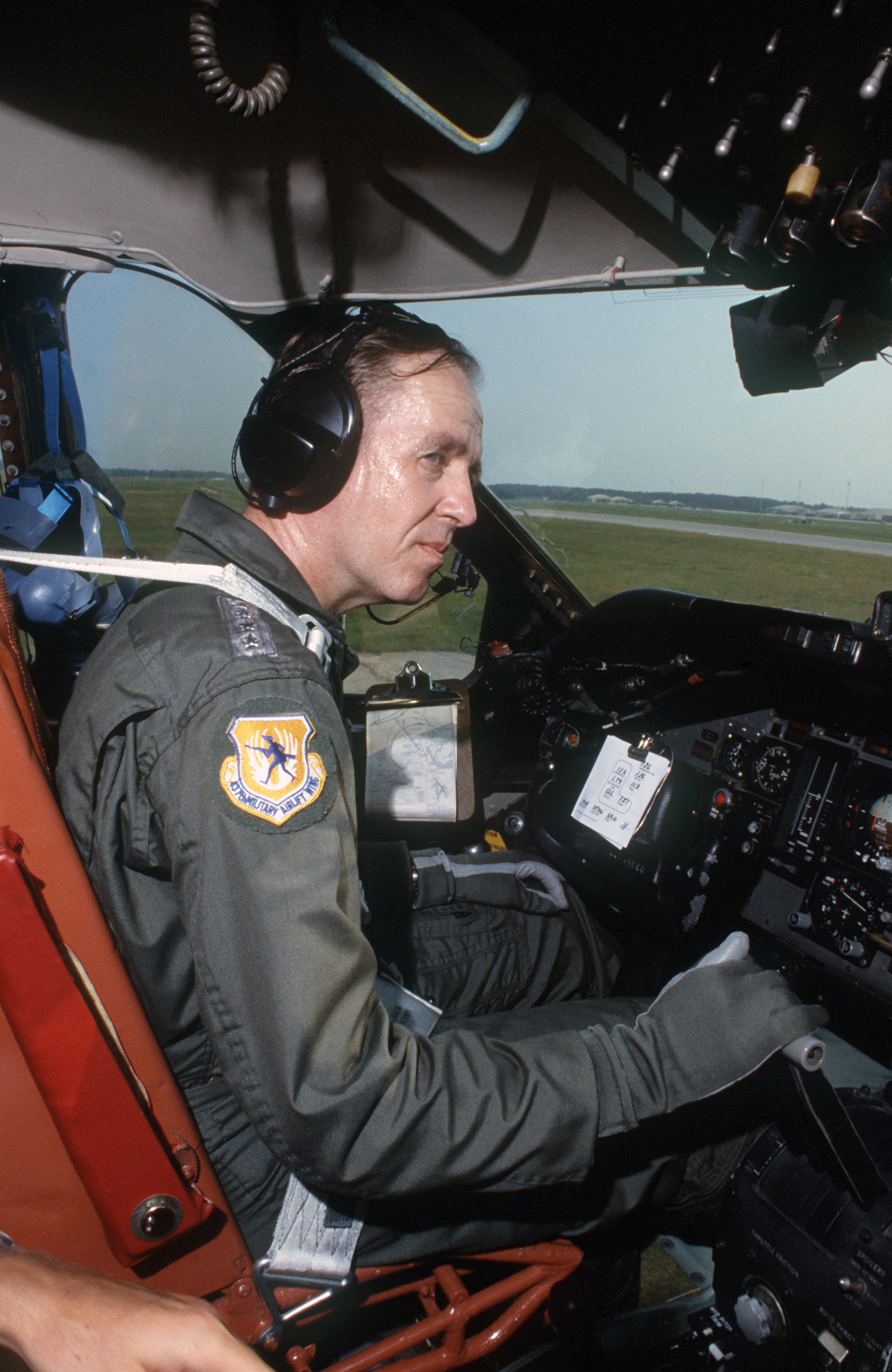
Air Force Chief of Staff General Larry D. Welch flies an Lockheed C-141 Starlifter.

With the near end of the Cold-War by 1989, Welch maintained that The United States Air Force are still in robust condition and always ready in-case a threat in the future by a new adversary attack. Welch also pushed for the new training for all of the Air Force personnel in-order to adjust with the new and advance modern technology that will be equipped into the new aircraft by the future, such as the new computerization aircraft. Welch also pushed for all United States Air Force Aircraft cockpit that are still using the analogue equipment to be upgraded with the new computerization technology. During Welch testimony in the senate armed services committee in May 1989, Welch also emphasized about the further development of the Air Force technology which will play primary role in the future, such as the developing a new tactical-fighter aircraft with new advance and computerization technology, which led to the new F-22 program. Welch also emphasize about the need to push the B-2 program that have a more advance technology that will play primary role in the United States Air Force Strategic Bombers Aircraft by the future in-which Senator John Warner, the high-ranking members of the armed services committee agreed with Welch statement.

As a result, the Air Force got more funding to speed up the B-2 stealth bombers program and also the begin the development of the new and more advance stealth tactical-fighter air which started the YF-22 program and eventually would become the new F-22 Raptor fighter aircraft.

In March 1989, Larry Welch was rebuked by Defense Secretary Dick Cheney who intended to maintain civilian control of the military, due to Welch's unauthorized talks with a Congressman discussing some unresolved issues. Welch also argued that the federal deficit was also becoming a major national concern and that a smaller defense budget would be seen by some as major means of reducing the deficit. Welch emphasize that neither facts nor logic lead to a conclusion that the deficit is caused by increases within the defense spending or is likely to be cured by the decreases in defense spending.

During his last year tenure as Air Force Chief of Staff Welch warn that Saddam Hussein buildup of its Military arsenal and his eager to be the superpower in the Middle-East would become threat to its neighborhood. Welch also warned about the potential threat within the Middle-East country by Iraq, which eventually resulted in the Iraq invasion of Kuwait on August 2, 1990, a month after Welch retired from his tenure as Air Force Chief of Staff. During his last tenure as Air Force Chief of Staff, Welch mostly advising the Bush administration and the National Security Council about the possible scenario if Iraq invade its neighbor and spark war within the Middle-East region. Welch also argued that maintaining that the Soviet phasedown brought to a head all the clichés about air power and the need to reexamine budgets accompanied by congressional pressure to spend the so-called “peace dividend.”

On June 30, 1990, Welch retired from his position as Air Force Chief of Staff after four-years of tenure as Air Force Chief of Staff and 39 years active-duty service within the United States Air Force. Welch also become one of the candidate to succeed Admiral William Crowe as Chairman of the Joint Chiefs of Staff. His retirement ceremony was held at Andrews Air Force Base with Secretary of Defense Dick Cheney and Air Force Secretary Donald B. Rice delivered Welch retirement remarks. Secretary Rice praises Welch effort in modernizing the United States Air Force in-order to adjust within the incoming future advance technology.

== Decorations ==
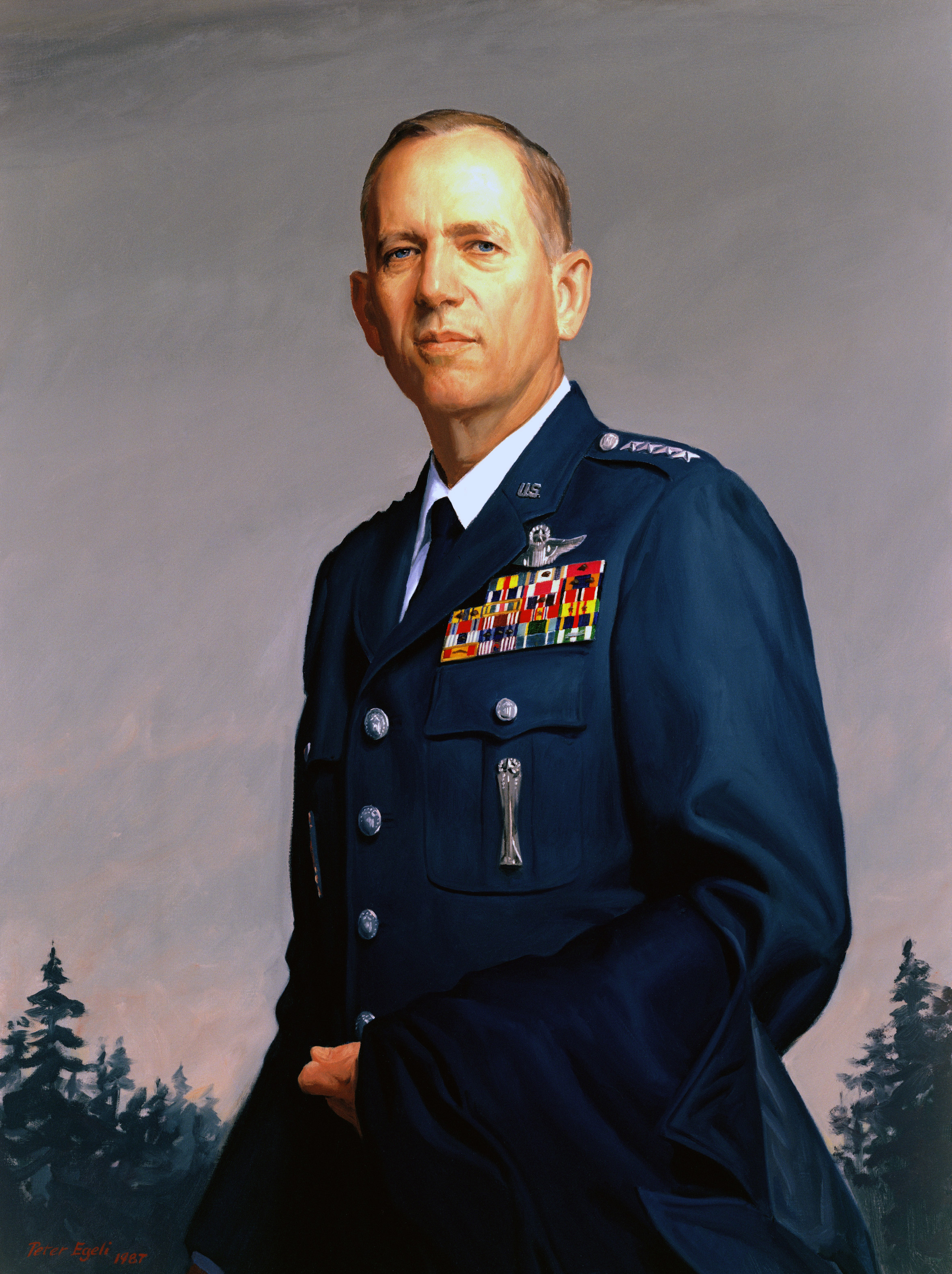
Official Portrait of United States Air Force Chief of Staff General Larry D. Welch.

Welch is a command pilot with more than 6,500 flying hours. His military decorations and awards include the Defense Distinguished Service Medal with oak leaf cluster, Air Force Distinguished Service Medal with oak leaf cluster, Legion of Merit with oak leaf cluster, Distinguished Flying Cross, Meritorious Service Medal, Air Medal with six oak leaf clusters, Air Force Commendation Medal with two oak leaf clusters, Joint Meritorious Unit Award and Air Force Outstanding Unit Award with "V" device and two oak leaf clusters.

- U.S. Air Force Command Pilot Badge
- Office of the Joint Chiefs of Staff Identification Badge
- Master Missileman Badge
- Defense Distinguished Service Medal with oak leaf cluster
- Air Force Distinguished Service Medal with oak leaf cluster
- Legion of Merit with oak leaf cluster
- Distinguished Flying Cross
- Meritorious Service Medal
- Air Medal with six oak leaf clusters
- Air Force Commendation Medal with two oak leaf clusters
- Joint Meritorious Unit Award
- Air Force Outstanding Unit Award with V device and two oak leaf clusters

== Retirement and further work ==
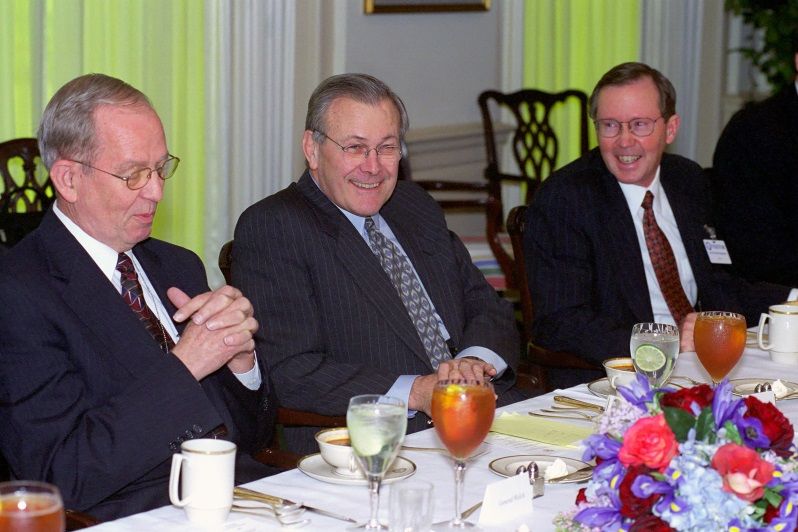
Former United States Air Force Chief of Staff General Larry D. Welch with Secretary of Defense Donald Rumsfeld during a meeting for members of the Commission to Assess the Ballistic Missile Threat to the United States at The Pentagon on March 16, 2001.

Welch was promoted to general on August 1, 1984, with same date of rank and retired on July 1, 1990. In 1998 he spent several months on the Rumsfeld Commission, which reported to Congress on the ballistic missile threat to the United States.

In 2009, Welch retired as the president of the Institute for Defense Analyses in Alexandria, Virginia. He continues to serve as a Senior Fellow at the Institute for Defense Analyses. He also serves on the Defense Policy Board, the USSTRATCOM Strategic Advisory Group, the Sandia Corporation Board of Directors, and the Lawrence Livermore National Laboratory Director's Review Committee.

In October 2007, Welch was asked by Robert Gates to lead the Defense Science Board task force that would study the 2007 United States Air Force nuclear weapons incident as part of a larger review of US Department of Defense procedures and policies for handling nuclear weapons. Welch briefed the results of the review before the U.S. Senate Committee on Armed Services on February 12, 2008.

In 2014, Secretary of Defense Hagel asked Welch and retired Admiral John Harvey to lead an Independent Review of the Department of Defense Nuclear Enterprise. The report was delivered to the Secretary of Defense in June 2014.

In February 2022 following Russian invasion of Ukraine, Welch commented about the need on for a more strict for command and control regarding the use of Strategic Weapon in-order to avoid the possibility of a Nuclear Conflict. Welch also commented on the concept of the fifth domain regarding the cyber operations and cyberspace, stating that the extensive operations in cyberspace have actually been implemented for decades. However Welch also stated that although it has been implemented for decades, but either cyber operations and cyberspace still indeed requires further maturing.

== Gallery ==
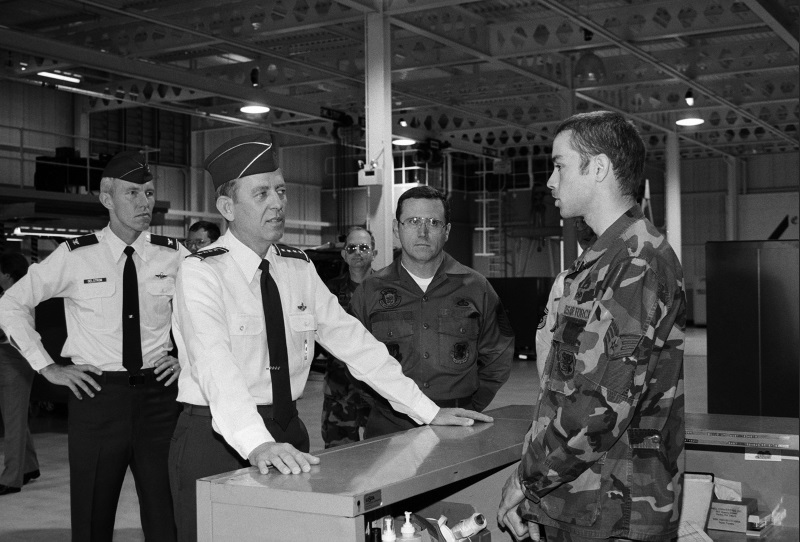
Commanders-in-Chief of the Strategic Air Command Gen. Larry D. Welch during a visit to Vandenberg Air Force Base in Lompoc, California on January 15, 1986.

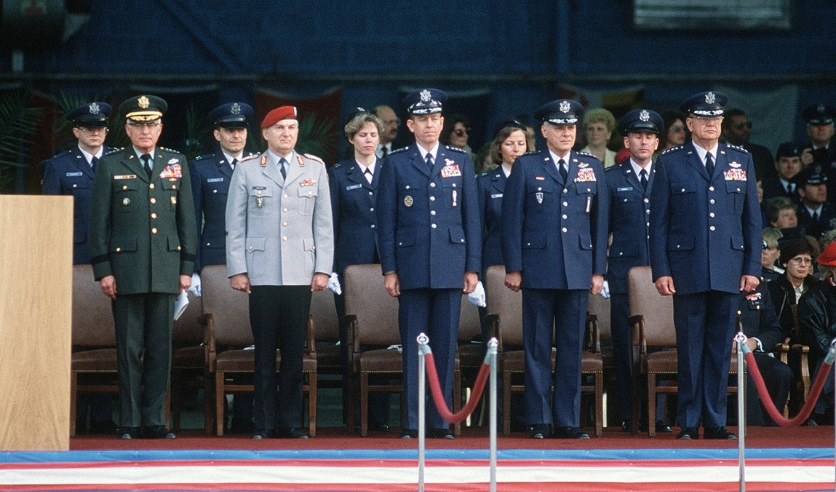
United States Air Force Chief of Staff Gen. Larry D. Welch with Supreme Allied Commander Europe Gen. Bernard W. Rogers and Commander of United States Air Forces in Europe Gen. Charles L. Donnelly Jr. and Commanders of 9th Air Force Gen. William L. Kirk at NATO Allied Air Command Airshow at Ramstein Air Force Base in Frankfurt, Germany, on January 17, 1987.

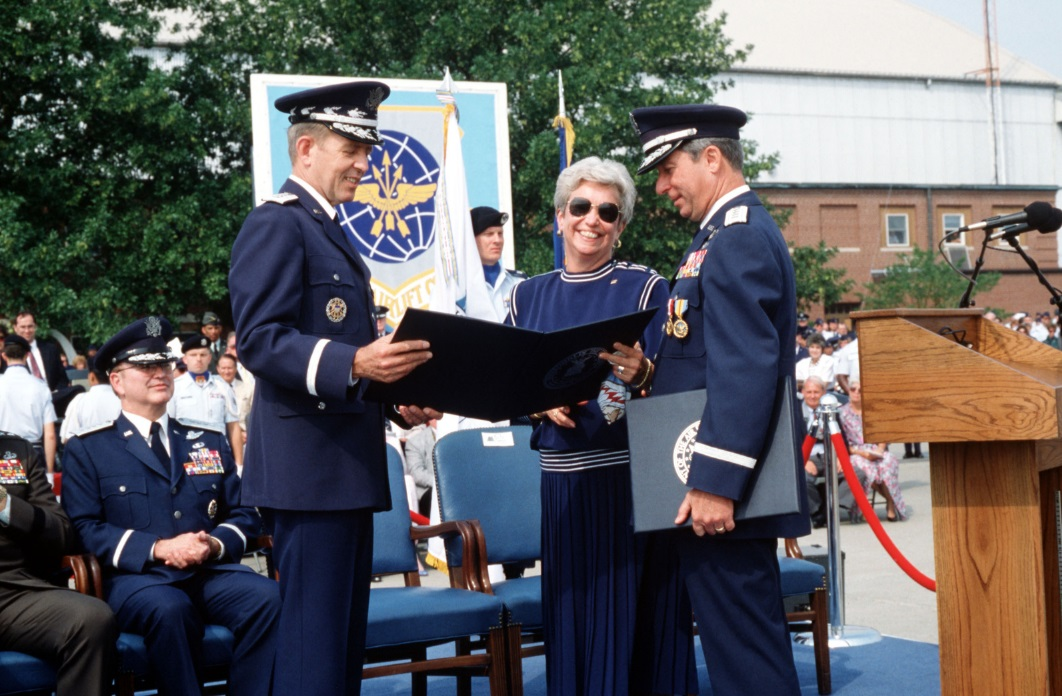
Air Force Chief of Staff Gen. Larry D. Welch presents a retirement certificate to Commander of Air Mobility Command Gen. Duane H. Cassidy at Scott Air Force Base in Belleville, Illinois on September 22, 1989.

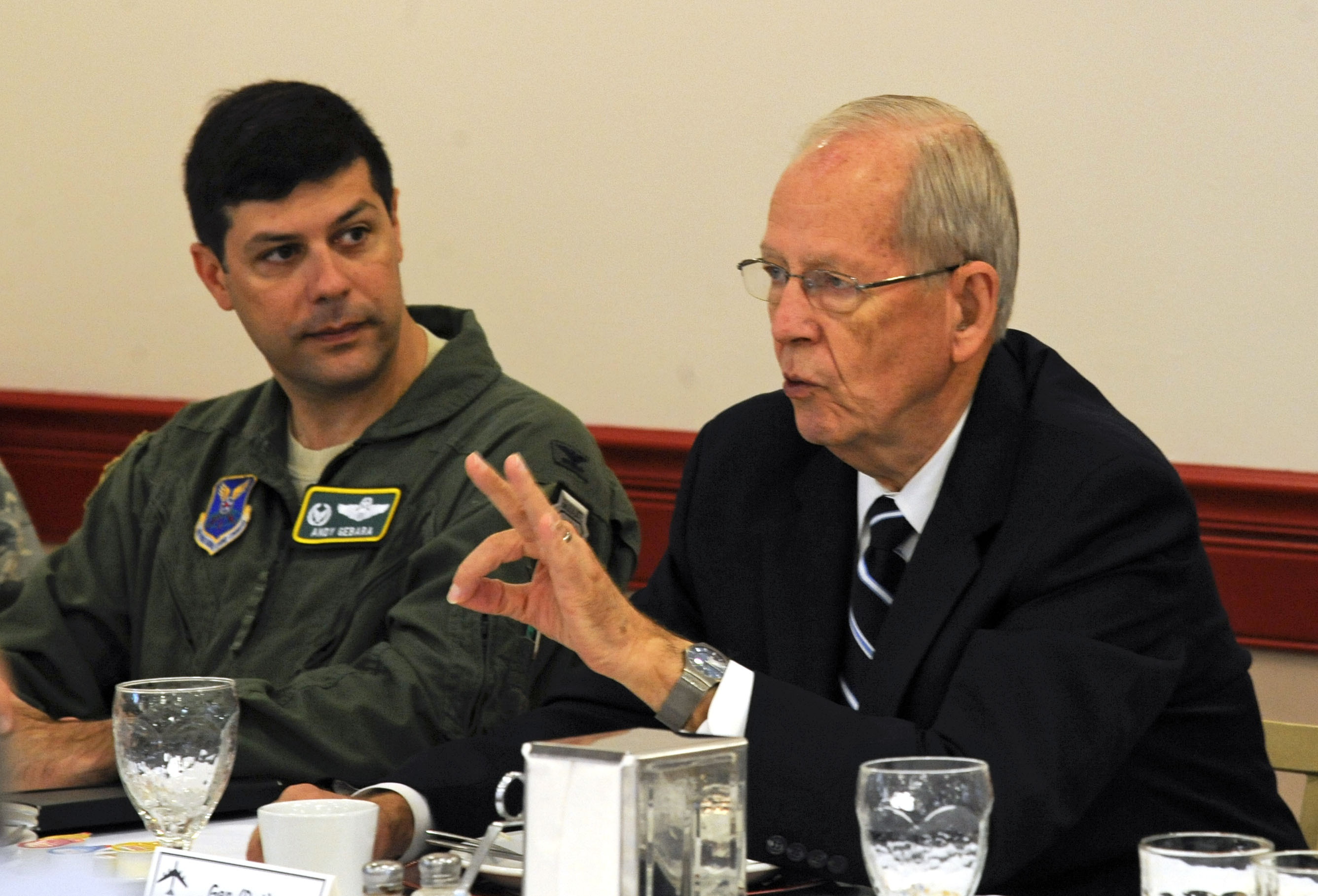
Retired General Larry Welch speaks at the Defense Science Board breakfast as Colonel Andrew Gebara, the 2nd Bomb Wing Commander, listens at Barksdale Air Force Base, on August 28, 2012.

Military offices
Preceded by Gen. Bennie L. Davis	Commander, Strategic Air Command; 1985—1986	Succeeded by Gen. John T. Chain Jr.
Preceded by Gen. Charles A. Gabriel	Chief of Staff of the United States Air Force; 1986–1990	Succeeded by Gen. Michael J. Dugan
