= Russell E. Dougherty =

United States Air Force general

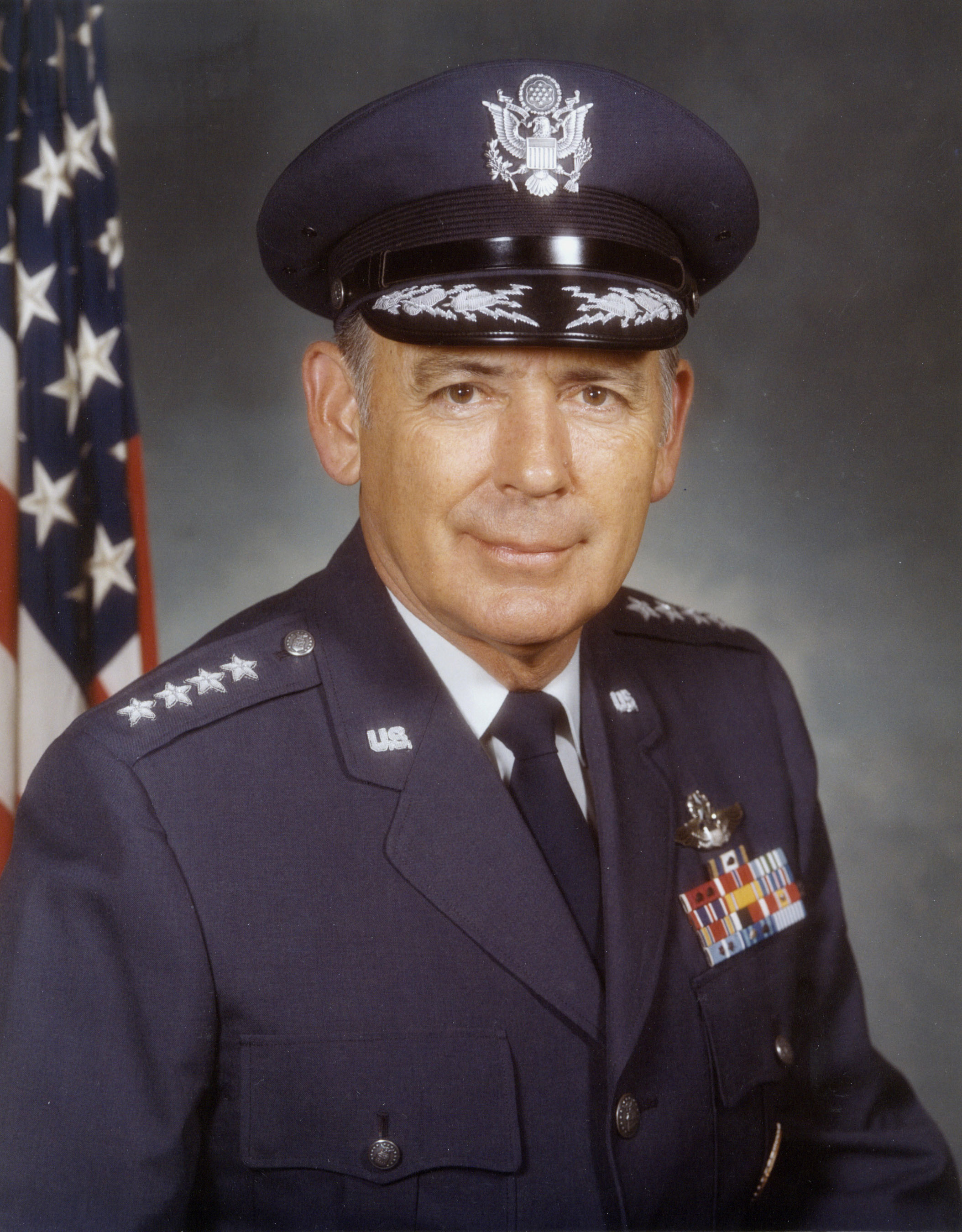
- General Russell Elliott Dougherty
- Born: November 15, 1920; Glasgow, Kentucky, U.S.
- Died: September 7, 2007 (aged 86); Alexandria, Virginia, U.S.
- Military career
- Allegiance: United States of America
- Branch: United States Air Force
- Service years: 1941–1977
- Rank: General
- Commands: Strategic Air Command; Second Air Force
- Conflicts: World War II
- Awards: Defense Distinguished Service Medal; Air Force Distinguished Service Medals (3); Legions of Merit (3); Bronze Star

General Russell Elliott Dougherty (November 15, 1920 – September 7, 2007) was Commander in Chief of the Strategic Air Command and director of strategic target planning (Joint Strategic Target Planning Staff), at Offutt Air Force Base, Nebraska.

General Dougherty graduated from Western Kentucky University, the Law School of the University of Louisville and the National War College. While attending Louisville, he became a member of Lambda Chi Alpha fraternity. In addition, General Dougherty held an honorary doctor of laws degree from the University of Akron, an honorary doctor of science degree from Westminster College, and is an "Old Master" of Purdue University.

After serving in the Federal Bureau of Investigation, General Dougherty entered active military service in the Army Air Corps as an aviation cadet in 1941 at the outbreak of World War II; previously, he had been a member of the 123rd Cavalry, Kentucky National Guard. He received his commission and pilot wings in March 1943.

During World War II, he was an instructor pilot in the Air Training Command and later he served in the 3d Air Force in crew and instructor pilot duties, as both a B-17 Flying Fortress and a B-29 pilot. His post World War II assignments encompass varied duties in operational, maintenance, administrative, political/military and command duties in Air Force, joint, and international assignments.

While finishing law school at the University of Louisville in 1947 he served as a unit instructor with the Air Force Reserve at Standiford Field, Louisville, Kentucky. In 1948 General Dougherty was transferred to the Far East Air Forces. While flying with the 19th Bombardment Wing, he served as staff judge advocate for the wing and later as assistant staff judge advocate for the 20th Air Force. In April 1950 he became the assistant staff judge advocate for FEAF Headquarters in Japan and, at the outbreak of the Korean War, was assigned to temporary duty in intelligence with FEAF.

General Dougherty returned to the United States in 1951 and was assigned to Air Material Command at Wright-Patterson Air Force Base, Ohio, as chief of the Appeals and Litigation Division, and as the assistant U.S. Air Force trial attorney for litigation arising out of Air Force procurement and contractual activities.

In December 1952 General Dougherty elected to leave the Judge Advocate General's Department for assignment to the Strategic Air Command and attended both B-29 refresher and KC-97 Stratofreighter transition training. In June 1953 he began successive assignments in SAC as operations officer for the 303d Air Refueling Squadron; commander of the 303d Armament and Electronics Squadron; deputy chief of operations, 303d Bombardment Wing; and commander, 358th Bombardment Squadron, all at Davis-Monthan Air Force Base, Arizona. He was assigned to Headquarters 15th Air Force, SAC, as chief, Operations Division, where he planned the B-52 round-the-world non-stop flight, Operation Power Flite, in 1957. Later he became the deputy director of operations, Headquarters 15th Air Force.

He attended the National War College during 1959–60 and, following graduation, was assigned duty in Headquarters U.S. Air Force in the Office of the Deputy Director for War Plans. In April 1961 he was appointed deputy assistant director of plans for joint matters, and in February 1963 he was made the assistant director for plans for joint and National Security Council matters.

General Dougherty had four assignments in joint and international duties. During 1964–65, he was the deputy director for plans and operations (J-3), Headquarters U.S. European Command, in Paris, France. During this assignment in November 1964, he was the United States' planner for the successful U.S./Belgian rescue operation at Stanleyville in the Congo. In August 1965 he returned to Washington as director, European Region, Office of the Secretary of Defense (International Security Affairs). In July 1967 he again returned to Europe and served until August 1969 as director, J-5 (Plans and Policy) at Headquarters U.S. European Command, Stuttgart, Germany.

In September 1969 General Dougherty was again assigned to Headquarters U.S. Air Force where he served as the assistant deputy chief of staff, plans and operations, and in February 1970 became deputy chief of staff, plans and operations for the U.S. Air Force. He was assigned as commander, 2d Air Force, SAC, with headquarters at Barksdale Air Force Base, Louisiana, in April 1971. In this position, General Dougherty commanded the U.S. Air Force's largest numbered Air Force, consisting of the majority of SAC's B-52 bombers and KC-135 tankers.

On May 1, 1972, General Dougherty was promoted to his four-star grade and assigned as Chief of Staff, Supreme Headquarters Allied Powers Europe, headquarters of NATO's Allied Command Europe. He returned to the United States on August 1, 1974, to become the eighth commander of the Strategic Air Command.

== Awards and decorations ==
US Air Force Command Pilot Badge
Office of the Joint Chiefs of Staff Identification Badge

Defense Distinguished Service Medal
Air Force Distinguished Service Medal with two bronze oak leaf clusters
Legion of Merit with two oak leaf clusters
Bronze Star
Joint Service Commendation Medal
Air Force Outstanding Unit Award
American Defense Service Medal
American Campaign Medal
World War II Victory Medal
Army of Occupation Medal
National Defense Service Medal with one bronze service star
Korean Service Medal with two service stars
Air Force Longevity Service Award with silver and two bronze oak leaf clusters
United Nations Korea Medal

- He received the Joint Service Commendation Medal for his tenure as the U.S. Air Force's operations deputy on the Joint Staff. He was a member of the Kentucky State Bar Association and the Bar Association of the U.S. Supreme Court.
- He was inducted into Omicron Delta Kappa at the University of Louisville in 1947. In 1992 he was awarded the society's highest honor, the Laurel Crowned Circle Award.

Dougherty retired from the Air Force October 1, 1977, and practiced law in the Washington, D.C. area for several years. He died in Alexandria, Virginia on September 7, 2007, and is buried in Arlington National Cemetery. General Dougherty is honored at the Aviation Heritage Park and Museum in Bowling Green, Ky where his story is told with a museum exhibit and the display of a Lockheed T-33 Shooting Star inside the park.

== Notes ==
Military offices
Preceded by John C. Meyer	Commander, Strategic Air Command; 1974–1977	Succeeded by Richard H. Ellis
