= John C. Meyer =

United States Air Force general

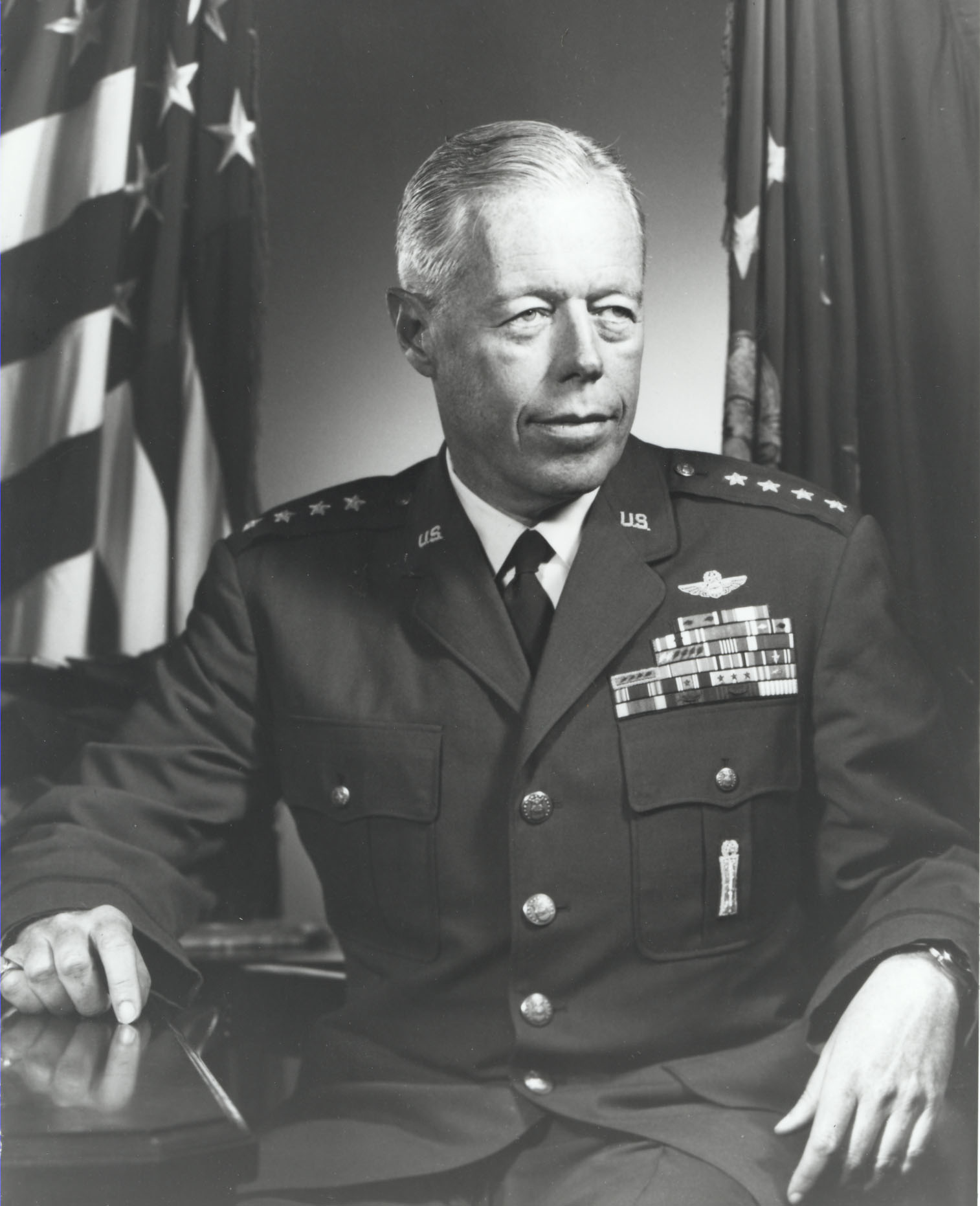
- General John C. Meyer
- Born: April 3, 1919; Brooklyn, New York, U.S.
- Died: December 2, 1975 (aged 56); Los Angeles, California, U.S.
- Burial place: Arlington National Cemetery
- Military career
- Allegiance: United States
- Branch: United States Army Air Forces; United States Air Force
- Service years: 1939–1974
- Rank: General
- Units: 4th Fighter Interceptor Wing; 352nd Fighter Group
- Commands: Strategic Air Command; Twelfth Air Force; 4th Fighter Interceptor Wing; 487th Fighter Squadron
- Conflicts: World War II; Korean War; Vietnam War
- Awards: Distinguished Service Cross (3); Air Force Distinguished Service Medal (2); Silver Star (2); Legion of Merit; Distinguished Flying Cross (7); Purple Heart; Air Medal (15)

General John Charles Meyer (April 3, 1919 – December 2, 1975) was a United States Air Force general and flying ace. During World War II, he commanded the 487th Fighter Squadron of the 352nd Fighter Group in England and became the fourth-ranking American ace in Europe, and he was the only Air Force pilot to receive three awards of the Distinguished Service Cross in the war. He also attained two more aerial victories in the Korean War, and later served as Vice Chief of Staff of the United States Air Force and as commander in chief of the Strategic Air Command, where he directed Operation Linebacker II in December 1972.

== Early life and education ==
Meyer was born in Brooklyn, New York, on April 3, 1919. He attended schools in New York, and entered Dartmouth College as a member of the class of 1941. One of his Dartmouth professors later said that Meyer had the strongest mind he had taught there. In 1939, he left Dartmouth to join the Army Air Corps.

== Military career ==
Meyer enlisted in the Air Corps in November 1939 in order to become a pilot. In July 1940, he was commissioned a second lieutenant and awarded his pilot wings.

=== World War II ===
Meyer (second from right) with other pilots of the 487th Fighter Squadron

In September 1942, Meyer was assigned to the newly formed 352nd Fighter Group at Westover, Massachusetts, where, as a first lieutenant, he took command of the 34th Pursuit Squadron. The squadron had recently returned from the Philippines in name only, and it needed new equipment and personnel. By the end of December, Meyer had received most of the ground personnel and had 26 pilots assigned, but no aircraft. In January 1943, the unit moved to New Haven, Connecticut, and began picking up the first Republic P-47 Thunderbolt fighters that it would take into combat. The 34th was redesignated the 487th Fighter Squadron in May 1943, before it received orders to deploy to England.

The 352nd Fighter Group arrived in England in the summer of 1943, with Meyer commanding its 487th Squadron. He was known as a strict commander who held himself to the same standards that he set for his men. He scored his first victory on November 26, 1943, flying a P-47 as a major. For more than a year, he was the squadron commander of George Preddy, who became the third-ranking American ace of the European war.

The group converted to the North American P-51 Mustang in April 1944. On May 8, 1944, Meyer won his first Distinguished Service Cross when, leading eight P-51s, he broke up an attack on a bomber stream, shooting down two German fighters and destroying a third, and returned to Bodney low on fuel and ammunition. In November 1944, he became deputy commander of the 352nd Fighter Group. On November 11, 1944, he shot down three Me 109s and a Fw 190, for which he received a second Silver Star. On November 21, 1944, he led 11 P-51s against more than 40 German fighters east of Leipzig and shot down three Fw 190s, which earned him a second Distinguished Service Cross.

In December 1944, the group moved temporarily to an airfield in Belgium, under the control of the IX Tactical Air Command. On January 1, 1945, during Operation Bodenplatte, about 50 German fighters attacked the field as Meyer was preparing to lead 12 P-51s into the air. He took off under fire with full wing tanks, shot down an Fw 190 just after raising his landing gear, and downed a second in a 45-minute running battle. His Distinguished Service Cross citation credited his attack with saving the airfield from heavy damage, and the 352nd was credited with destroying 23 German fighters that day. It was his third award of the Distinguished Service Cross. The aviation writer Edward H. Sims devoted the eleventh chapter of his book American Aces in Great Fighter Battles of World War II to Meyer's actions that day.

By January 9, 1945, Meyer had completed 200 combat missions. While travelling to Paris for a radio broadcast, he was seriously injured in a car accident, which ended his combat service in the war. He had flown 462 combat hours, and was credited with 24 aerial victories and 13½ aircraft destroyed on the ground, a total of 37½. He was the fourth-ranking American ace in the European theater, and he led the top 15 aces of the Eighth Air Force in aircraft destroyed on the ground.

=== Postwar years ===
In 1946, after almost seven years of service, Meyer received a regular commission, and he returned to Dartmouth to finish his degree. He received a Bachelor of Arts degree in political geography in 1948. That year, he was selected as the Secretary of the Air Force's principal point of contact with the United States House of Representatives. In 1949, he was appointed commander of the American Legion's Air Service Post 501.

=== Korean War ===
In August 1950, Meyer took command of the 4th Fighter-Interceptor Group at New Castle, Delaware. He took the group's North American F-86 Sabre jets to Korea, where it flew in the First United Nations Counteroffensive and the Chinese Communist Forces Spring Offensive campaigns.

On December 22, 1950, Meyer led a flight of eight F-86s against 15 MiG-15s, in what his award orders describe as the first major all-jet fighter battle in history. The Sabres shot down six MiGs without loss, and Meyer himself shot one of them down. He destroyed two MiG-15s during the war, bringing his total of enemy aircraft destroyed in the air and on the ground in both wars to 39½. Air Force Magazine described him as the seventh-ranking ace in the history of the Air Force.

=== Air Defense and Strategic Air Command ===
After a tour of duty as director of operations for Air Defense Command and Continental Air Defense Command, Meyer graduated from the Air War College at Maxwell Air Force Base, Alabama, in June 1956, and was retained as an instructor at the college. He was then assigned to the Strategic Air Command (SAC), where he commanded two air divisions in the northeastern United States, the 57th Air Division and the 45th Air Division. In July 1962, he moved to SAC headquarters at Offutt Air Force Base, Nebraska, as deputy director of plans.

=== Twelfth Air Force and Joint Staff ===
In November 1963, Meyer took command of the Tactical Air Command's Twelfth Air Force, with headquarters at James Connally Air Force Base in Waco, Texas. The Twelfth Air Force provided tactical air units for joint logistics and close air support training with Army ground units in the western United States. In February 1966, he was assigned to the Organization of the Joint Chiefs of Staff, where he served first as deputy director and then as vice director of the Joint Staff. In May 1967, he became director of operations on the Joint Staff.

=== Vice Chief of Staff ===
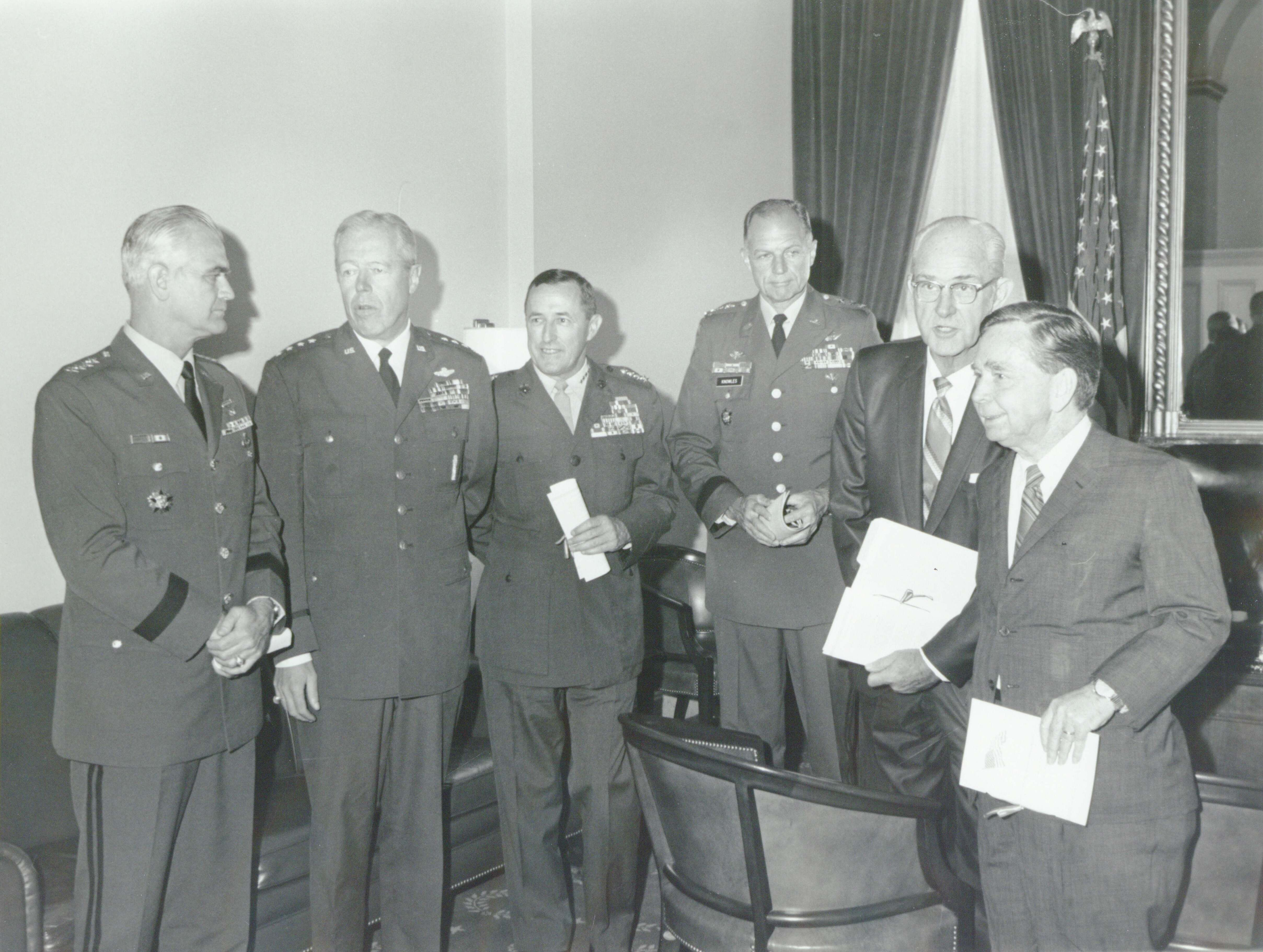
Meyer, as Air Force Vice Chief of Staff, with Army Chief of Staff General William C. Westmoreland and Speaker of the House Carl Albert during Flag Day ceremonies on June 14, 1971

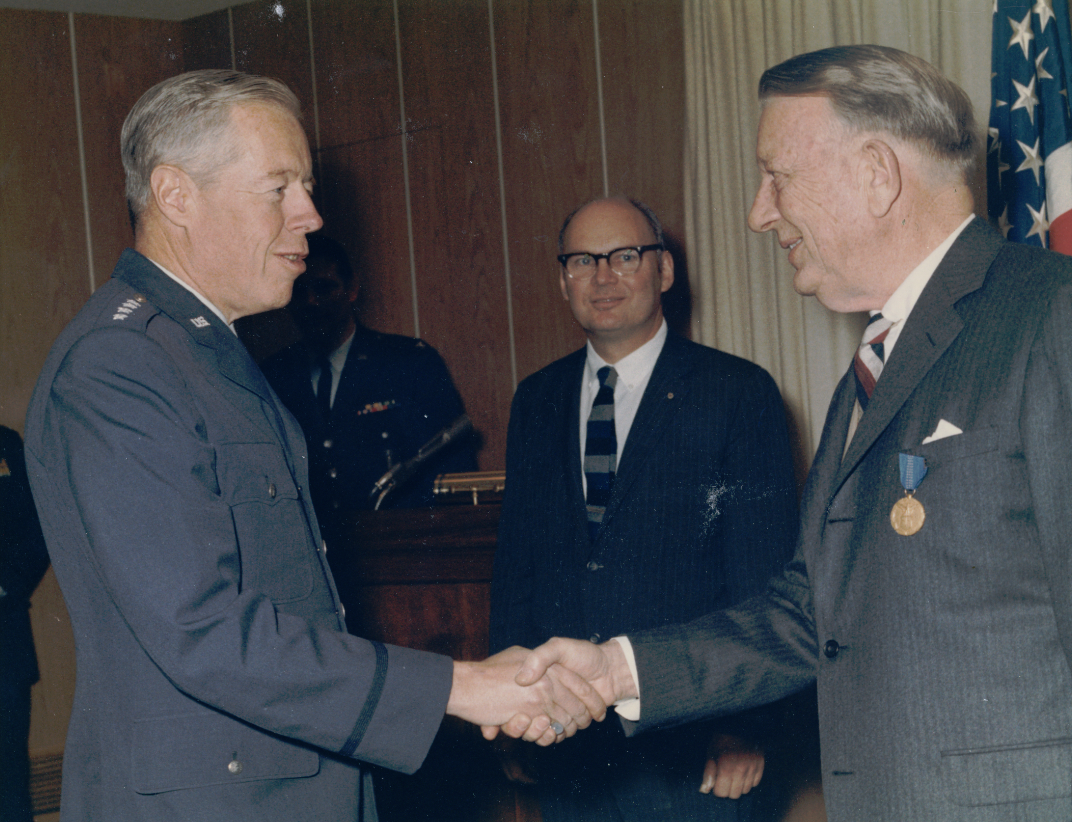
Meyer with Hardy Cross Dillard, a judge of the International Court of Justice

In August 1969, Meyer became Vice Chief of Staff of the United States Air Force, and he held the post until April 1972.

=== Strategic Air Command ===
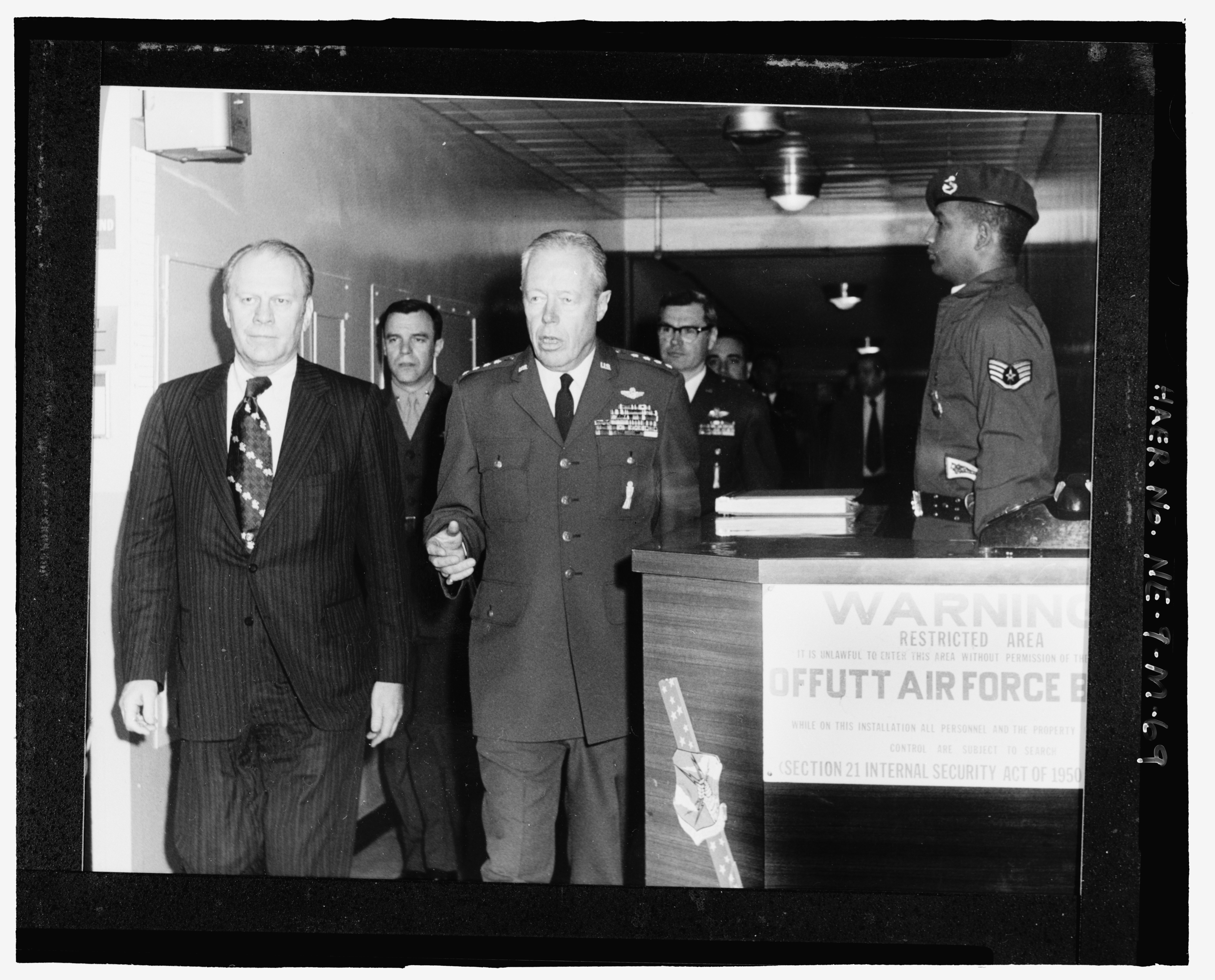
Meyer and Vice President Gerald R. Ford during Ford's visit to Strategic Air Command headquarters in February 1974

On May 1, 1972, Meyer became the seventh commander in chief of SAC and director of the Joint Strategic Target Planning Staff. He was the second fighter ace to command SAC, after Bruce K. Holloway.

In August 1972, Meyer asked the Eighth Air Force for ideas for a possible bombing campaign against North Vietnam, but he rejected its approach, chiefly out of concern about inadvertent bombing of civilians and collateral damage. He directed SAC planners to devise their own plan, which produced a simple and rigid scheme of three waves of bombers following the same route. The historians Gary D. Joiner and Ashley E. Dean write that history would prove the Eighth Air Force plan superior, and that Meyer's plan was far too constricting.

Operation Linebacker II began on December 18, 1972. After heavy B-52 losses on the third night, which amounted to a loss rate of seven percent, Meyer decided to press on and called for heavier strikes on surface-to-air missile sites and storage areas. The aviation historian Walter J. Boyne judged the decision correct, because the North Vietnamese were rapidly using up their missiles. On December 22, Meyer directed his planners to change tactics and to plan a new kind of raid for December 26, and he moved mission planning to Guam under the Eighth Air Force commander, Lieutenant General Gerald W. Johnson. Joiner and Dean write that Meyer listened to the crews' concerns after the losses, and that tactics and routes were then varied.

On January 3, 1973, Meyer visited Andersen Air Force Base on Guam to boost morale after the campaign had placed heavy strains on the B-52 squadrons. According to the historian Mark Clodfelter, his answers in a question-and-answer session with the crews provoked such anger that some airmen walked out, while others threw cans and furniture at him.

In March 1973, Meyer received the Frank Hawks Memorial Award for his contributions to aviation. He retired from the Air Force in July 1974.

== Personal life and death ==
Meyer married Mary Moore, who had served as a WAVES officer in World War II. They had five children, Christine, John Jr., Michael, Margaret and Martha. Their son John C. Meyer Jr. graduated from the United States Air Force Academy and became an Air Force officer.

After retiring, Meyer joined the defense consulting firm R & D Associates. On December 2, 1975, he collapsed and died after his regular morning jog at his home in Los Angeles, at the age of 56. He was buried at Arlington National Cemetery.

In 1988, Meyer was inducted into the National Aviation Hall of Fame. The Falcon Foundation, which gives scholarships to candidates for the Air Force Academy, offers a scholarship in his honor.

== Aerial victory credits ==
Chronicle of aerial victories
Date	#	Type	Location	Aircraft flown	Unit Assigned
November 26, 1943	1	Messerschmitt Bf 109	Groningen, Netherlands	Republic P-47D Thunderbolt	487 FS, 352 FG
December 4, 1943	1	Bf 109	Utrecht, Netherlands	P-47D	487 FS, 352 FG
December 22, 1943	1	Bf 109	Lingen, Germany	P-47D	487 FS, 352 FG
April 10, 1944	1; 0.5	Bf 109; Focke Wulf Fw 190	Reims, France	North American P-51B Mustang	487 FS, 352 FG
May 8, 1944	3	Bf 109	Hanover, Germany & Brunswick, Germany	P-51B	487 FS, 352 FG
May 12, 1944	1	Bf 109	Frankfurt, Germany	P-51B	487 FS, 352 FG
September 11, 1944	3; 1	Bf 109; Fw 190	Göttingen, Germany; Mühlhausen, Germany	North American P-51D Mustang	487 FS, 352 FG
November 21, 1944	3	Fw 190	Merseburg, Germany	P-51D	487 FS, 352 FG
November 27, 1944	1	Bf 109	Münster, Germany	P-51D	487 FS, 352 FG
December 26, 1944	2.5	Bf 109	Ollheim, Germany & Üxheim, Germany	P-51D	487 FS, 352 FG
December 27, 1944	2	Fw 190	Bonn, Germany	P-51D	487 FS, 352 FG
December 31, 1944	1	Arado Ar 234	Euskirchen, Germany	P-51D	487 FS, 352 FG
January 1, 1945	2	Fw 190	Liège, Belgium	P-51D	487 FS, 352 FG
December 22, 1950	1	Mikoyan-Gurevich MiG-15	Sinuiju, North Korea	North American F-86A Sabre	4 FIW Hq
April 12, 1951	1	MiG-15	Sinuiju, North Korera	F-86A	4 FIW Hq

SOURCES: Air Force Historical Study 85: USAF Credits for the Destruction of Enemy Aircraft, World War II and Air Force Historical Study 81: USAF Credits for the Destruction of Enemy Aircraft, Korean War, Freeman 1993

== Awards and decorations ==
Meyer's military decorations include the Distinguished Service Cross with two oak leaf clusters, Air Force Distinguished Service Medal with oak leaf cluster, Silver Star with oak leaf cluster, Legion of Merit, Distinguished Flying Cross with six oak leaf clusters, Air Medal with 14 oak leaf clusters, Croix de Guerre with palm from both France and Belgium. In March 1973 be received the Frank Hawks Memorial Award for his many contributions to aviation. He retired July 1, 1974.

US Air Force Command Pilot Badge

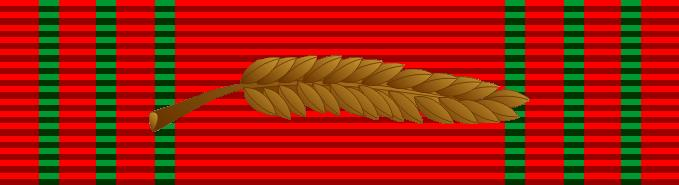
Distinguished Service Cross with two bronze oak leaf clusters
Air Force Distinguished Service Medal with one bronze oak leaf cluster
Silver Star with one bronze oak leaf cluster
Legion of Merit
Distinguished Flying Cross with a silver and bronze oak leaf clusters
Purple Heart
Air Medal with two silver and two bronze oak leaf clusters
Air Medal with bronze oak leaf cluster (second ribbon required for accouterment spacing)
Army Commendation Medal
Air Force Presidential Unit Citation with four bronze oak leaf clusters
American Defense Service Medal with one service star
American Campaign Medal
European-African-Middle Eastern Campaign Medal with one silver campaign star
World War II Victory Medal
National Defense Service Medal with one bronze service star
Korean War Service Medal with three bronze campaign stars
Air Force Longevity Service Award with silver and two bronze oak leaf clusters
Small Arms Expert Marksmanship Ribbon
Croix de Guerre with Palm (France)
Croix de Guerre with Palm (Belgium)
United Nations Service Medal for Korea
Korean War Service Medal

=== Distinguished Service Cross citation (1st Award) ===

Meyer, John C.
Lieutenant Colonel (Air Corps), U.S. Army Air Forces
487th Fighter Squadron, 352nd Fighter Group, 8th Air Force
Date of Action: May 08, 1944

The President of the United States of America, authorized by Act of Congress July 9, 1918, takes pleasure in presenting the Distinguished Service Cross to Lieutenant Colonel (Air Corps) John Charles Meyer, United States Army Air Forces, for extraordinary heroism in connection with military operations against an armed enemy while serving as Pilot of a P-51 Fighter Airplane in the 487th Fighter Squadron, 352d Fighter Group, Eighth Air Force, in aerial combat against enemy forces on 8 May 1944, during an air mission over Germany. On this date, Lieutenant Colonel Meyer led a flight of eight fighters in an attack against greatly superior numbers of enemy fighters trying to intercept a friendly bomber formation. The enemy flight was dispersed. During the engagement Lieutenant Colonel Meyer became separated from his flight except for one wingman and lost considerable altitude. While regaining altitude he observed another flight of fifteen more enemy fighters flying toward the bombers. Accompanied only by his wingman, he unhesitatingly attacked the formation with utter disregard of the odds against him, destroyed two enemy fighters and broke up the formation. Before setting course for home Lieutenant Colonel Meyer attacked and destroyed another enemy fighter. The courage and determination to destroy the enemy displayed by Lieutenant Colonel Meyer upon this occasion reflect highest credit upon himself and the Armed Forces of the United States.

— Valor awards for John Charles Meyer,

=== Distinguished Service Cross citation (2nd Award) ===

Meyer, John C.
Lieutenant Colonel (Air Corps), U.S. Army Air Forces
487th Fighter Squadron, 352nd Fighter Group, 8th Air Force
Date of Action: September 11, 1944

The President of the United States of America, authorized by Act of Congress July 9, 1918, takes pleasure in presenting a Bronze Oak Leaf Cluster in lieu of a Second Award of the Distinguished Service Cross to Lieutenant Colonel (Air Corps) John Charles Meyer, United States Army Air Forces, for extraordinary heroism in connection with military operations against an armed enemy while serving as Pilot of a P-51 Fighter Airplane in the 487th Fighter Squadron, 352d Fighter Group, Eighth Air Force, in aerial combat against enemy forces on 11 September 1944. On this date, Lieutenant Colonel Meyer was leading his squadron of P-51 fighters and was proceeding to rendezvous with a task force of heavy bombers, when he observed approximately thirty hostile aircraft forming up near the bomber track. He promptly led his squadron in an attack on the enemy formation and succeeded in scattering it into ones and twos. With the enemy separated, his squadron proceeded to engage them with great tenacity. Lieutenant Colonel Meyer sent one enemy plane crashing to the ground and found himself separated entirely from his squadron. At this time he observed about fifteen enemy aircraft preparing to engage the bombers. Without regard to the superior enemy numbers, he unhesitatingly attacked the enemy formation without support of any kind, and destroyed three of them. The formation was dispersed and any possible attack on the bombers frustrated. The outstanding heroism and devotion to duty displayed by Lieutenant Colonel Meyer on this occasion are in keeping with the highest traditions of the Armed Forces of the United States.

— Valor awards for John Charles Meyer,

=== Distinguished Service Cross citation (3rd Award) ===

Meyer, John C.
Lieutenant Colonel (Air Corps), U.S. Army Air Forces
487th Fighter Squadron, 352nd Fighter Group, 8th Air Force
Date of Action: January 01, 1945

The President of the United States of America, authorized by Act of Congress July 9, 1918, takes pleasure in presenting a Second Bronze Oak Leaf Cluster in lieu of a Third Award of the Distinguished Service Cross to Lieutenant Colonel (Air Corps) John Charles Meyer, United States Army Air Forces, for extraordinary heroism in connection with military operations against an armed enemy while serving as Pilot of a P-51 Fighter Airplane and as Deputy Commander, 352d Fighter Group, Eighth Air Force, in aerial combat against enemy forces on 1 January 1945. On this date, to save the airfield and ground personnel from extensive damage by a surprise enemy strafing attack, Colonel Meyer unhesitatingly led his squadron off the field in the face of an attacking force of approximately fifty hostile fighters, and engaged the enemy as they initiated their first strafing run. Despite the enemy's great tactical advantage in numbers and position, and although his own aircraft was burdened with loaded wing tanks and its maneuverability greatly reduced, Colonel Meyer viciously engaged the enemy formation, personally destroying two of their aircraft. His valiant action in the face of extreme danger unquestionably saved the airfield from great damage. The extraordinary heroism and complete disregard for his personal safety displayed by Colonel Meyer on this occasion reflect highest credit upon himself and the Armed Forces of the United States.

== Effective dates of promotion ==
Insignia	Rank	Date
	General	July 31, 1969
	Lieutenant general	June 12, 1967
	Major general	April 1, 1963
	Brigadier general	August 1, 1959
	Colonel	January 19, 1951
	Lieutenant colonel	April 18, 1944
	Major	September 2, 1943
	Captain	January 21, 1943
	First lieutenant	October 24, 1941
	Second lieutenant	July 26, 1940

Military offices
Preceded by Bruce K. Holloway	Commander, Strategic Air Command; 1972–1974	Succeeded by Russell E. Dougherty
