= Charles A. Gabriel =

United States Air Force General

Charles Alvin Gabriel
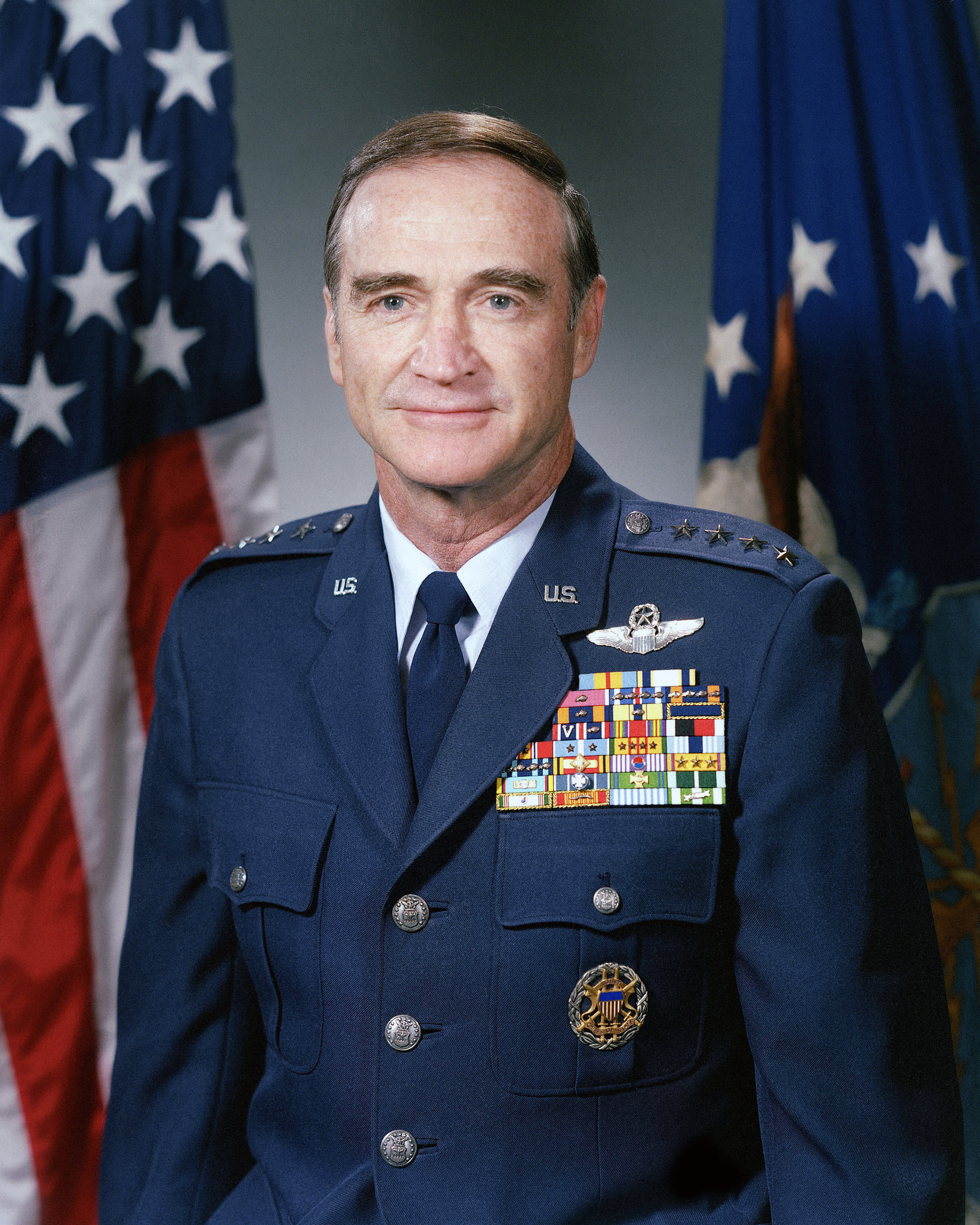
- General Charles Alvin Gabriel in September 1984
- Born: January 21, 1928; Lincolnton, North Carolina, U.S.
- Died: September 4, 2003 (aged 75); Arlington County, Virginia, U.S.
- Burial place: Arlington National Cemetery
- Military career
- Allegiance: United States
- Branch: United States Air Force
- Service years: 1950–1986
- Rank: General
- Commands: Chief of Staff of the United States Air Force; United States Air Forces in Europe; 432nd Tactical Reconnaissance Wing
- Conflicts: Korean War; Vietnam War
- Awards: Defense Distinguished Service Medal (2); Air Force Distinguished Service Medal (2); Navy Distinguished Service Medal; Legion of Merit (2); Distinguished Flying Cross (5); Air Medal (15); Full list

Charles Alvin Gabriel (January 21, 1928 – September 4, 2003) was the 11th Chief of Staff of the United States Air Force. As chief of staff, Gabriel served in a dual capacity. He was a member of the Joint Chiefs of Staff which, as a body, acts as the principal military adviser to the president, the National Security Council, and the Secretary of Defense. In his other capacity, he was responsible to the Secretary of the Air Force for managing the vast human and materiel resources of the world's most powerful aerospace force.

== Early life and education ==
Gabriel was born in Lincolnton, North Carolina, on January 21, 1928. Following graduation from high school, he attended Catawba College, Salisbury, North Carolina, for two years before entering the United States Military Academy. He graduated from the academy in 1950 with a Bachelor of Science degree and a commission in the United States Air Force. Gabriel earned a Master of Science degree in engineering management from George Washington University, Washington, D.C., in 1963. He graduated from the Command and Staff Course at the Naval War College, Newport, Rhode Island, in 1962; and the Industrial College of the Armed Forces, Fort Lesley J. McNair, Washington, D.C., in 1967.

== Military career ==
After graduation from West Point, Gabriel entered pilot training at Goodfellow Air Force Base, Texas, and completed advanced training at Craig Air Force Base, Alabama, in December 1951. His first assignment was to South Korea, where he flew 100 combat missions in F-51 Mustangs and F-86 Sabres and was credited with shooting down two MiG-15s.

From December 1952 to November 1955, Gabriel was assigned to the 86th Fighter-Interceptor Wing, Landstuhl Air Base, Germany, as a pilot and later a squadron air operations officer. He then spent three years as an air officer commanding at the United States Air Force Academy, Colorado.

In July 1959, Gabriel transferred to Moody Air Force Base, Georgia, where he served as adjutant for the 3550th Pilot Training Group and commander of the Headquarters Squadron Section. Following graduation from the Naval War College in August 1962 and completion of his master's degree at George Washington University in August 1963, he was assigned as a staff officer in the Directorate of Plans, Headquarters U.S. Air Force, Washington, D.C. In August 1966 he entered the Industrial College of the Armed Forces.

Returning to Europe in August 1967, Gabriel served as executive officer to the chief of staff, Supreme Headquarters Allied Powers Europe, Mons, Belgium. He returned to the United States for combat crew training in July 1970 and was subsequently assigned as commander of the 432nd Tactical Reconnaissance Wing at Udon Royal Thai Air Force Base, Thailand, flying 152 combat missions in F-4 Phantom IIs. While wing commander he accepted orders from General John D. Lavelle to falsify classified operations reports. General Lavelle was forced to retire because of these orders. He returned to the Air Staff in July 1972, as deputy for operational forces and deputy director of operations.

Gabriel served as deputy chief of staff for operations at Headquarters Tactical Air Command, Langley Air Force Base, Virginia, from February 1975 to August 1977. He then became deputy commander in chief, U.S. Forces Korea and deputy commander in chief, United Nations Command, Seoul, South Korea.

In April 1979, Gabriel returned to Air Force headquarters as deputy chief of staff for operations, plans and readiness. He served as commander in chief, United States Air Forces in Europe and commander of Allied Air Forces Central Europe at Ramstein Air Base, Germany, from July 1980 to June 1982. Gabriel was promoted to general on August 1, 1980, and retired on July 1, 1986.

Gabriel died in Arlington County, Virginia, of Alzheimer's disease, on September 4, 2003. He is buried at Arlington National Cemetery.

== Flight information ==
- Rating: Command pilot
- Flight hours: More than 4,200 flying hours
- Aircraft flown: F-51 Mustang, F-86 Sabre, and F-4 Phantom II

== Awards and decorations ==
US Air Force Command Pilot Badge
Joint Chiefs of Staff Badge

Personal decorations
	Defense Distinguished Service Medal with bronze oak leaf cluster
	Air Force Distinguished Service Medal with bronze oak leaf cluster
	Navy Distinguished Service Medal
Width-44 crimson ribbon with a pair of width-2 white stripes on the edges	Legion of Merit with bronze oak leaf cluster
	Distinguished Flying Cross with four bronze oak leaf clusters
	Air Medal with two silver and two bronze oak leaf clusters
	Air Medal with bronze oak leaf cluster (Second ribbon required for accouterment spacing)
	Air Force Commendation Medal with bronze oak leaf cluster
Unit awards
	Presidential Unit Citation
	Air Force Outstanding Unit Award with Valor device and bronze oak leaf cluster
Campaign and service medals
	World War II Victory Medal
	Army of Occupation Medal
	National Defense Service Medal with bronze service star
	Korean Service Medal with two bronze service stars
	Vietnam Service Medal with four bronze oak leaf clusters
Service, training, and marksmanship awards
	Air Force Overseas Long Tour Service Ribbon
	Air Force Longevity Service Award with silver and three bronze oak leaf clusters
Foreign awards
	Order of Merit of the Federal Republic of Germany, Knight Commander's Cross
	South Korean Order of National Security Merit, Gugseon Medal
	Order of Military Merit Antonio Nariño, Knight with three gold stars
	Air Force Cross of Aeronautical Merit, Grand Cross
	Order of Aeronautical Merit (Brazil), Grand Officer
	Venezuelan Air Force Cross
	Hilal-e-Imtiaz, Pakistan
	Republic of Korea Presidential Unit Citation
	Vietnam Gallantry Cross Unit Award
	United Nations Service Medal for Korea
	Vietnam Campaign Medal

== See also ==
- List of commanders of USAFE

Military offices
Preceded by Gen. Lew Allen Jr.	Chief of Staff of the United States Air Force; 1982–1986	Succeeded by Gen. Larry D. Welch
