= List of United States Air Force four-star generals =

Flag of an Air Force four-star general

The rank of general (or full general, or four-star general) is the highest rank normally achievable in the United States Air Force. It ranks above lieutenant general (three-star general) and below general of the Air Force (five-star general).

There have been 243 four-star generals in the history of the U.S. Air Force. Of these, 239 achieved that rank while on active duty, three were promoted after retirement, and one was promoted posthumously. Generals entered the Air Force via several paths: 63 were commissioned via the U.S. Military Academy (USMA), 49 via the aviation cadet program, 48 via the U.S. Air Force Academy (USAFA), 47 via Air Force Reserve Officer Training Corps (AFROTC) at a civilian university, 14 via AFROTC at a senior military college, 10 via Air Force Officer Training School (OTS), four via the U.S. Naval Academy (USNA), four via Reserve Officer Training Corps (ROTC) at a civilian university, two via direct commission (direct), one via direct commission inter-service transfer from the Army National Guard (ARNG), and one via direct commission inter-service transfer from the Royal Canadian Air Force (RCAF).

== List of generals ==
Entries in the following list of four-star generals are indexed by the numerical order in which each officer was promoted to that rank while on active duty, or by an asterisk (*) if the officer did not serve in that rank while on active duty. Each entry lists the general's name, date of rank, active-duty positions held while serving at four-star rank, number of years of active-duty service at four-star rank (Yrs), year commissioned and source of commission, number of years in commission when promoted to four-star rank (YC), and other biographical notes (years of birth and death are shown in parentheses in the Notes column).

#	Name	Photo	Date of rank	Position	Yrs	Commission	YC	Notes
1	Henry H. Arnold		19 Mar 1943	Commanding General, Army Air Forces (CG AAF), 1942–1944.; Commanding General, Army Air Forces/Commanding General, Twentieth Air Force (CG AAF), 1944–1945.	1	1907 (USMA)	36	(1886–1950) Promoted to General of the Army, 21 Dec 1944; to General of the Air Force, 7 May 1949.
2	Joseph T. McNarney		7 Mar 1945	Deputy Supreme Allied Commander, Mediterranean/Commanding General, Mediterranean Theater of Operations, U.S. Army (DSACMED/CG MTOUSA), 1944–1945.; Commanding General, U.S. Forces European Theater/Military Governor of the U.S. Occupation Zone in Germany (CG USFET/USMILGOV), 1945–1947.; Senior Member, United Nations Military Staff Committee, 1947.; Commanding General, Air Materiel Command (CG AMC), 1947–1949.; Chairman, Department of Defense Management Committee, 1949–1952.	7	1915 (USMA)	30	(1893–1972)
3	George C. Kenney		9 Mar 1945	Commanding General, Allied Air Forces, South West Pacific Area (CG AAFSWPA), 1942–1945.; Member, Military Staff Committee of the Joint Chiefs of Staff, 1945–1946.; Commanding General, Strategic Air Command (CG SAC), 1946–1948.; Commander, Air University, 1948–1951.	6	1917 (cadet)	28	(1889–1977)
4	Carl A. Spaatz		11 Mar 1945	Commanding General, U.S. Strategic Air Forces in Europe (CG USSAFE), 1944–1945.; Commanding General, U.S. Strategic Air Forces in the Pacific (CG USASTAF), 1945.; Deputy to the Commanding General, Army Air Forces for Special Organizational Planning, 1945–1946.; Commanding General, Army Air Forces (CG AAF), 1946–1947.; Chief of Staff, U.S. Air Force (CSAF), 1947–1948.	3	1914 (USMA)	31	(1891–1974)
5	Hoyt S. Vandenberg		1 Oct 1947	Vice Chief of Staff, U.S. Air Force (VCSAF), 1947–1948.; Chief of Staff, U.S. Air Force (CSAF), 1948–1953.	6	1923 (USMA)	24	(1899–1954) Director of Central Intelligence, 1946–1947. Nephew of U.S. Senator Arthur H. Vandenberg; son married daughter of Air Force four-star general Leon W. Johnson.
6	Muir S. Fairchild		27 May 1948	Vice Chief of Staff, U.S. Air Force (VCSAF), 1948–1950.	2	1918 (cadet)	30	(1894–1950) Died in office.
7	Nathan F. Twining		10 Oct 1950	Vice Chief of Staff, U.S. Air Force (VCSAF), 1950–1953.; Chief of Staff, U.S. Air Force (CSAF), 1953–1957.; Chairman, Joint Chiefs of Staff (CJCS), 1957–1960.	10	1918 (USMA)	32	(1897–1982) Brother of Marine Corps four-star general Merrill B. Twining.
8	John K. Cannon		29 Oct 1951	Commanding General, Tactical Air Command (CG TAC), 1951–1954.	3	1917 (direct)	34	(1892–1955)
9	Benjamin W. Chidlaw		29 Oct 1951	Commanding General, Air Defense Command (CG ADC), 1951–1954.; Commander in Chief, Continental Air Defense Command/Commanding General, Air Defense Command (CINCONAD/CG ADC), 1954–1955.	4	1922 (USMA)	29	(1900–1977)
10	Curtis E. LeMay		29 Oct 1951	Commanding General, Strategic Air Command (CG SAC), 1948–1953.; Commander, Strategic Air Command (COMSAC), 1953–1955.; Commander in Chief, Strategic Air Command (CINCSAC), 1955–1957.; Vice Chief of Staff, U.S. Air Force (VCSAF), 1957–1961.; Chief of Staff, U.S. Air Force (CSAF), 1961–1965.	14	1929 (cadet)	22	(1906–1990) American Independent Party nominee for U.S. Vice president, 1968.
11	Lauris Norstad		5 Jul 1952	Commander in Chief, U.S. Air Forces in Europe (CINCUSAFE), 1951.; Commander in Chief, U.S. Air Forces in Europe/Commander in Chief, Allied Air Forces in Central Europe (CINCUSAFE/CINCAIRCENT), 1951–1953.; Air Deputy to Supreme Allied Commander, Europe (Air Deputy SHAPE), 1953–1956.; Supreme Allied Commander, Europe/Commander in Chief, U.S. European Command (SACEUR/USCINCEUR), 1956–1962.; Supreme Allied Commander, Europe (SACEUR), 1962–1963.	11	1930 (USMA)	22	(1907–1988)
12	Otto P. Weyland		5 Jul 1952	Commanding General, Far East Air Forces (CG FEAF), 1951–1954.; Commanding General, Tactical Air Command (CG TAC), 1954–1959.	7	1923 (Texas A&M)	29	(1902–1979)
13	Thomas D. White		30 Jun 1953	Vice Chief of Staff, U.S. Air Force (VCSAF), 1953–1957.; Chief of Staff, U.S. Air Force (CSAF), 1957–1961.	8	1920 (USMA)	33	(1902–1965)
14	Edwin W. Rawlings		19 Feb 1954	Commanding General, Air Materiel Command (CG AMC), 1951–1959.	5	1930 (cadet)	24	(1904–1997)
15	Earle E. Partridge		19 Feb 1954	Commanding General, Far East Air Forces (CG FEAF), 1954–1955.; Commander in Chief, Continental Air Defense Command/Commander, Air Defense Command (CINCONAD/COMADC), 1955–1956.; Commander in Chief, Continental Air Defense Command (CINCONAD), 1956–1957.; Commander in Chief, North American Air Defense Command/Commander in Chief, Continental Air Defense Command (CINCNORAD/CINCONAD), 1957–1959.	5	1924 (USMA)	30	(1900–1990)
16	Orval R. Cook		1 Apr 1954	Deputy Commander in Chief, U.S. European Command (DCINCEUR), 1954–1956.	2	1922 (USMA)	32	(1898–1980)
17	Laurence S. Kuter		29 May 1955	Commanding General, Far East Air Forces (CG FEAF), 1955–1957.; Commander in Chief, Pacific Air Forces (CINCPACAF), 1957–1959.; Commander in Chief, North American Air Defense Command/Commander in Chief, Continental Air Defense Command (CINCNORAD/CINCONAD), 1959–1962.	7	1927 (USMA)	28	(1905–1979) U.S. Representative to the International Civil Aviation Organization, 1946–1948.
18	Thomas S. Power		30 Jun 1957	Commander in Chief, Strategic Air Command (CINCSAC), 1957–1960.; Commander in Chief, Strategic Air Command/Director, Joint Strategic Target Planning Staff (CINCSAC), 1960–1964.	7	1929 (cadet)	28	(1905–1970)
19	Frank F. Everest		1 Jul 1957	Commander in Chief, U.S. Air Forces in Europe (CINCUSAFE), 1957–1959.; Commander, Tactical Air Command (COMTAC), 1959–1961.	4	1928 (USMA)	29	(1904–1983)
20	Leon W. Johnson		31 Aug 1957	U.S. Military Representative, NATO Military Committee (USMILREP), 1956–1958.; Air Deputy to Supreme Allied Commander, Europe (Air Deputy SHAPE), 1958–1961.; Director, Net Evaluation Subcommittee Staff, National Security Council, 1961–1965.	8	1926 (USMA)	31	(1904–1997) Awarded Medal of Honor, 1943. Daughter married son of Air Force four-star general Hoyt S. Vandenberg.
21	Charles P. Cabell		11 Jul 1958	Deputy Director of Central Intelligence (DDCI), 1953–1962.	4	1925 (USMA)	33	(1903–1971) Distant cousin of Navy four-star admiral Richard H. Jackson.
22	Samuel E. Anderson		10 Mar 1959	Commander, Air Materiel Command (COMAMC), 1959–1961.; Commander, Air Force Logistics Command (COMAFLC), 1961.; Air Deputy to Supreme Allied Commander, Europe (Air Deputy SHAPE), 1961–1963.	4	1928 (USMA)	31	(1906–1982)
23	Emmett O'Donnell Jr.		31 Jul 1959	Commander in Chief, Pacific Air Forces (CINCPACAF), 1959–1963.	4	1928 (USMA)	31	(1906–1971)
24	Frederic H. Smith Jr.		1 Aug 1959	Commander in Chief, U.S. Air Forces in Europe (CINCUSAFE), 1959–1961.; Vice Chief of Staff, U.S. Air Force (VCSAF), 1961–1962.	3	1929 (USMA)	30	(1908–1980) Son-in-law of Navy five-star admiral Ernest J. King.
25	Truman H. Landon		28 Jun 1961	Commander in Chief, U.S. Air Forces in Europe (CINCUSAFE), 1961–1963.	2	1928 (USMA)	33	(1905–1986)
26	William F. McKee		29 Jun 1961	Commander, Air Force Logistics Command (COMAFLC), 1961–1962.; Vice Chief of Staff, U.S. Air Force (VCSAF), 1962–1964.	3	1929 (USMA)	32	(1906–1987) Assistant Administrator for Management and Development, National Aeronautics and Space Administration, 1964–1965; Administrator, Federal Aviation Agency, 1965–1968.
27	Walter C. Sweeney Jr.		30 Jun 1961	Commander, Tactical Air Command (COMTAC), 1961–1965.	4	1930 (USMA)	31	(1909–1965)
28	Bernard A. Schriever		1 Jul 1961	Commander, Air Force Systems Command (COMAFSC), 1961–1966.	5	1931 (Texas A&M)	30	(1910–2005)
29	John K. Gerhart		29 Jun 1962	Commander in Chief, North American Air Defense Command/Commander in Chief, Continental Air Defense Command (CINCNORAD/CINCONAD), 1962–1965.	3	1929 (cadet)	33	(1907–1981)
30	Dean C. Strother		30 Jun 1962	U.S. Military Representative, NATO Military Committee (USMILREP), 1962–1965.; Commander in Chief, North American Air Defense Command/Commander in Chief, Continental Air Defense Command (CINCNORAD/CINCONAD), 1965–1966.	4	1931 (USMA)	31	(1908–2000)
31	Mark E. Bradley Jr.		1 Jul 1962	Commander, Air Force Logistics Command (COMAFLC), 1962–1965.	3	1930 (USMA)	32	(1907–1999)
32	John P. McConnell		1 Oct 1962	Deputy Commander in Chief, U.S. European Command (DCINCEUR), 1962–1964.; Vice Chief of Staff, U.S. Air Force (VCSAF), 1964–1965.; Chief of Staff, U.S. Air Force (CSAF), 1965–1969.	7	1932 (USMA)	30	(1908–1986)
33	Robert M. Lee		4 Jun 1963	Air Deputy to Supreme Allied Commander, Europe (Air Deputy SHAPE), 1963–1966.	3	1931 (USMA)	32	(1909–2003)
34	Jacob E. Smart		5 Jun 1963	Commander in Chief, Pacific Air Forces (CINCPACAF), 1963–1964.; Deputy Commander in Chief, U.S. European Command (DCINCEUR), 1964–1966.	3	1931 (USMA)	32	(1909–2006) Assistant Administrator for Policy/DoD and Interagency Affairs, National Aeronautics and Space Administration, 1967–1973.
35	Joe W. Kelly		6 Jun 1963	Commander, Military Air Transport Service (COMMATS), 1960–1964.	1	1932 (USMA)	31	(1910–1979)
36	Gabriel P. Disosway		1 Aug 1963	Commander in Chief, U.S. Air Forces in Europe (CINCUSAFE), 1963–1965.; Commander, Tactical Air Command (COMTAC), 1965–1968.	5	1933 (USMA)	30	(1910–2001)
37	Hunter Harris Jr.		18 Jul 1964	Commander in Chief, Pacific Air Forces (CINCPACAF), 1964–1967.	3	1932 (USMA)	32	(1909–1987)
38	Howell M. Estes II		19 Jul 1964	Commander, Military Airlift Command (COMAC), 1964–1969.	5	1936 (USMA)	28	(1914–2007) Father of Air Force four-star general Howell M. Estes III.
39	John D. Ryan		1 Dec 1964	Commander in Chief, Strategic Air Command/Director, Joint Strategic Target Planning Staff (CINCSAC), 1964–1967.; Commander in Chief, Pacific Air Forces (CINCPACAF), 1967–1968.; Vice Chief of Staff, U.S. Air Force (VCSAF), 1968–1969.; Chief of Staff, U.S. Air Force (CSAF), 1969–1973.	9	1938 (USMA)	26	(1915–1983) Father of Air Force four-star general Michael E. Ryan.
40	William H. Blanchard		19 Feb 1965	Vice Chief of Staff, U.S. Air Force (VCSAF), 1965–1966.	1	1938 (USMA)	27	(1916–1966) Died in office.
41	Kenneth B. Hobson		31 Jul 1965	Commander, Air Force Logistics Command (COMAFLC), 1965–1967.	2	1932 (USMA)	33	(1908–1979)
42	Bruce K. Holloway		1 Aug 1965	Commander in Chief, U.S. Air Forces in Europe (CINCUSAFE), 1965–1966.; Vice Chief of Staff, U.S. Air Force (VCSAF), 1966–1968.; Commander in Chief, Strategic Air Command/Director, Joint Strategic Target Planning Staff (CINCSAC), 1968–1972.	7	1937 (USMA)	28	(1912–1999)
43	William S. Stone		28 Jul 1966	Air Deputy to Supreme Allied Commander, Europe (Air Deputy SHAPE), 1966–1968.	2	1934 (USMA)	32	(1910–1968) Died in office. Superintendent, U.S. Air Force Academy, 1959–1962.
44	Raymond J. Reeves		29 Jul 1966	Commander in Chief, North American Air Defense Command/Commander in Chief, Continental Air Defense Command (CINCNORAD/CINCONAD), 1966–1969.	3	1934 (USMA)	32	(1909–1998)
45	James Ferguson		30 Jul 1966	Commander, Air Force Systems Command (COMAFSC), 1966–1970.	4	1937 (cadet)	29	(1913–2000)
46	David A. Burchinal		31 Jul 1966	Deputy Commander in Chief, U.S. European Command (DCINCEUR), 1966–1973.	7	1940 (cadet)	26	(1915–1990)
47	Maurice A. Preston		1 Aug 1966	Commander in Chief, U.S. Air Forces in Europe (CINCUSAFE), 1966–1968.	2	1937 (USMA)	29	(1912–1983)
48	Joseph J. Nazzaro		1 Feb 1967	Commander in Chief, Strategic Air Command/Director, Joint Strategic Target Planning Staff (CINCSAC), 1967–1968.; Commander in Chief, Pacific Air Forces (CINCPACAF), 1968–1971.	4	1936 (USMA)	31	(1913–1990)
49	Thomas P. Gerrity		1 Aug 1967	Commander, Air Force Logistics Command (COMAFLC), 1967–1968.	1	1940 (cadet)	27	(1913–1968) Died in office.
50	William W. Momyer		13 Dec 1967	Commander, Seventh Air Force, 1966–1968.; Commander, Tactical Air Command (COMTAC), 1968–1973.	6	1939 (cadet)	28	(1916–2012)
51	Jack G. Merrell		29 Mar 1968	Commander, Air Force Logistics Command (COMAFLC), 1968–1972.	4	1939 (USMA)	29	(1915–1993)
52	Horace M. Wade		31 Jul 1968	Commander in Chief, U.S. Air Forces in Europe (CINCUSAFE), 1968–1969.; Chief of Staff, Supreme Headquarters Allied Powers Europe (COFS SHAPE), 1969–1972.; Vice Chief of Staff, U.S. Air Force (VCSAF), 1972–1973.	5	1938 (cadet)	30	(1916–2001)
53	George S. Brown		1 Aug 1968	Commander, Seventh Air Force, 1968–1970.; Commander, Air Force Systems Command (COMAFSC), 1970–1973.; Chief of Staff, U.S. Air Force (CSAF), 1973–1974.; Chairman, Joint Chiefs of Staff (CJCS), 1974–1978.	10	1941 (USMA)	27	(1918–1978)
54	Joseph R. Holzapple		1 Feb 1969	Commander in Chief, U.S. Air Forces in Europe (CINCUSAFE), 1969–1971.	2	1941 (cadet)	28	(1914–1973)
55	Seth J. McKee		30 Jul 1969	Commander in Chief, North American Air Defense Command/Commander in Chief, Continental Air Defense Command (CINCNORAD/CINCONAD), 1969–1973.; Commander in Chief, North American Air Defense Command/Commander in Chief, Continental Air Defense Command/Commander, Aerospace Defense Command (CINCNORAD/CINCONAD/COMADC), 1973.	4	1939 (cadet)	30	(1916–2016)
56	John C. Meyer		31 Jul 1969	Vice Chief of Staff, U.S. Air Force (VCSAF), 1969–1972.; Commander in Chief, Strategic Air Command/Director, Joint Strategic Target Planning Staff (CINCSAC), 1972–1974.	5	1940 (cadet)	29	(1919–1975)
57	Jack J. Catton		1 Aug 1969	Commander, Military Airlift Command (COMAC), 1969–1972.; Commander, Air Force Logistics Command (COMAFLC), 1972–1974.	5	1941 (cadet)	28	(1920–1990)
58	Lucius D. Clay Jr.		1 Sep 1970	Commander, Seventh Air Force, 1970–1971.; Commander in Chief, Pacific Air Forces (CINCPACAF), 1971–1973.; Commander in Chief, North American Air Defense Command/Commander in Chief, Continental Air Defense Command/Commander, Aerospace Defense Command (CINCNORAD/CINCONAD/COMADC), 1973–1975.; Commander in Chief, North American Air Defense Command/Commander in Chief, Continental Air Defense Command/Commander in Chief, Aerospace Defense Command (CINCNORAD/CINCONAD/CINCAD), 1975.	5	1942 (USMA)	28	(1919–1994) Son of Army four-star general Lucius D. Clay; grandson of U.S. Senator Alexander S. Clay.
59	Theodore R. Milton		31 Jul 1971	U.S. Military Representative, NATO Military Committee (USMILREP), 1971–1974.	3	1940 (USMA)	31	(1915–2010)
60	John D. Lavelle		1 Aug 1971	Commander, Seventh Air Force, 1971–1972.	1	1940 (cadet)	31	(1916–1979) Relieved, 1972.
61	David C. Jones		1 Sep 1971	Commander in Chief, U.S. Air Forces in Europe (CINCUSAFE), 1971–1974.; Commander in Chief, U.S. Air Forces in Europe/Commander, Allied Air Forces Central Europe (CINCUSAFE/COMAAFCE), 1974.; Chief of Staff, U.S. Air Force (CSAF), 1974–1978.; Chairman, Joint Chiefs of Staff (CJCS), 1978–1982.	11	1943 (cadet)	28	(1921–2013)
62	John W. Vogt Jr.		7 Apr 1972	Commander, Seventh Air Force, 1972–1973.; Commander in Chief, Pacific Air Forces (CINCPACAF), 1973–1974.; Commander in Chief, U.S. Air Forces in Europe/Commander, Allied Air Forces Central Europe (CINCUSAFE/COMAAFCE), 1974–1975.	3	1942 (cadet)	30	(1920–2010)
63	Russell E. Dougherty		1 May 1972	Chief of Staff, Supreme Headquarters Allied Powers Europe (COFS SHAPE), 1972–1974.; Commander in Chief, Strategic Air Command/Director, Joint Strategic Target Planning Staff (CINCSAC), 1974–1977.; Special Assistant to the Chief of Staff of the Air Force, 1977.	5	1943 (cadet)	29	(1920–2007) Executive Director, Air Force Association, 1980–1986. Father-in-law of Air Force four-star general Joseph W. Ralston.
*	George B. Simler		16 Aug 1972	(posthumous)	0	1942 (cadet)	30	(1921–1972)
64	Paul K. Carlton		9 Oct 1972	Commander, Military Airlift Command (COMAC), 1972–1977.; Commander in Chief, Military Airlift Command (CINCMAC), 1977.	5	1942 (cadet)	30	(1921–2009)
65	George J. Eade		18 Apr 1973	Deputy Commander in Chief, U.S. European Command (DCINCEUR), 1973–1975.	2	1942 (cadet)	31	(1921–2018)
66	Samuel C. Phillips		1 Aug 1973	Commander, Air Force Systems Command (COMAFSC), 1973–1975.	2	1942 (ROTC)	31	(1921–1990) Director, National Security Agency, 1972–1973.
67	Richard H. Ellis		30 Sep 1973	Vice Chief of Staff, U.S. Air Force (VCSAF), 1973–1975.; Commander in Chief, U.S. Air Forces in Europe/Commander, Allied Air Forces Central Europe (CINCUSAFE/COMAAFCE), 1975–1977.; Commander in Chief, Strategic Air Command/Director, Joint Strategic Target Planning Staff (CINCSAC), 1977–1981.	8	1942 (cadet)	31	(1919–1989) U.S. Commissioner for the U.S.-U.S.S.R. Standing Consultative Commission, 1982–1989.
68	Robert J. Dixon		1 Oct 1973	Commander, Tactical Air Command (COMTAC), 1973–1978.	5	1942 (RCAF)	31	(1920–2003)
69	Timothy F. O'Keefe		8 Oct 1973	Commander, Seventh Air Force, 1973–1974.	1	1940 (cadet)	33	(1919–1984)
70	Louis L. Wilson Jr.		1 Jul 1974	Commander in Chief, Pacific Air Forces (CINCPACAF), 1974–1977.	3	1943 (USMA)	31	(1919–2010)
71	Louis T. Seith		1 Aug 1974	Chief of Staff, Supreme Headquarters Allied Powers Europe (COFS SHAPE), 1974–1977.	3	1943 (USMA)	31	(1921–2007)
72	William V. McBride		1 Sep 1974	Commander, Air Force Logistics Command (COMAFLC), 1974–1975.; Vice Chief of Staff, U.S. Air Force (VCSAF), 1975–1978.	4	1942 (cadet)	32	(1922–2022)
73	William J. Evans		30 Aug 1975	Commander, Air Force Systems Command (COMAFSC), 1975–1977.; Commander in Chief, U.S. Air Forces in Europe/Commander, Allied Air Forces Central Europe (CINCUSAFE/COMAAFCE), 1977–1978.	3	1946 (USMA)	29	(1924–2000)
74	F. Michael Rogers		1 Sep 1975	Commander, Air Force Logistics Command (COMAFLC), 1975–1978.	3	1943 (cadet)	32	(1921–2014)
75	Daniel James Jr.		1 Sep 1975	Commander in Chief, North American Air Defense Command/Commander in Chief, Aerospace Defense Command (CINCNORAD/CINCAD), 1975–1977.; Special Assistant to the Chief of Staff of the Air Force, 1977–1978.	3	1943 (cadet)	32	(1920–1978) First African-American to achieve four-star rank in any service.
76	Robert E. Huyser		1 Sep 1975	Deputy Commander in Chief, U.S. European Command (DCINCEUR), 1975–1979.; Commander in Chief, Military Airlift Command (CINCMAC), 1979–1981.	6	1944 (cadet)	31	(1924–1997) U.S. Special Envoy to Iran, 1979.
77	John W. Roberts		29 Mar 1977	Commander, Air Training Command (COMATC), 1975–1979.	2	1944 (cadet)	33	(1921–1999)
78	William G. Moore Jr.		1 Apr 1977	Commander in Chief, Military Airlift Command (CINCMAC), 1977–1979.	2	1941 (cadet)	36	(1920–2012)
79	Lew Allen Jr.		31 Jul 1977	Commander, Air Force Systems Command (COMAFSC), 1977–1978.; Vice Chief of Staff, U.S. Air Force (VCSAF), 1978.; Chief of Staff, U.S. Air Force (CSAF), 1978–1982.	5	1946 (USMA)	31	(1925–2010) Director, National Security Agency, 1973–1977; Director, Jet Propulsion Laboratory, 1982–1990.
80	James R. Allen		1 Aug 1977	Chief of Staff, Supreme Headquarters Allied Powers Europe (COFS SHAPE), 1977–1979.; Deputy Commander in Chief, U.S. European Command (DCINCEUR), 1979–1981.; Commander in Chief, Military Airlift Command (CINCMAC), 1981–1983.	6	1948 (USMA)	29	(1925–1992) Superintendent, U.S. Air Force Academy, 1974–1977.
81	James E. Hill		21 Dec 1977	Commander in Chief, North American Air Defense Command/Commander in Chief, Aerospace Defense Command (CINCNORAD/CINCAD), 1977–1979.; Commander in Chief, North American Air Defense Command (CINCNORAD), 1979.	2	1943 (cadet)	34	(1921–1999)
82	Bryce Poe II		2 Feb 1978	Commander, Air Force Logistics Command (COMAFLC), 1978–1981.	3	1946 (USMA)	32	(1924–2000)
83	Alton D. Slay		1 Apr 1978	Commander, Air Force Systems Command (COMAFSC), 1978–1981.	3	1944 (cadet)	34	(1924–2015)
84	Wilbur L. Creech		1 May 1978	Commander, Tactical Air Command (COMTAC), 1978–1984.	6	1949 (cadet)	29	(1927–2003)
85	James A. Hill		10 Jul 1978	Vice Chief of Staff, U.S. Air Force (VCSAF), 1978–1980.	2	1944 (cadet)	34	(1923–2010)
86	John W. Pauly		1 Aug 1978	Commander in Chief, U.S. Air Forces in Europe/Commander, Allied Air Forces Central Europe (CINCUSAFE/COMAAFCE), 1978–1980.	2	1945 (USMA)	33	(1923–2013)
87	Bennie L. Davis		1 Apr 1979	Commander, Air Training Command (COMATC), 1979–1981.; Commander in Chief, Strategic Air Command/Director, Joint Strategic Target Planning Staff (CINCSAC), 1981–1985.	6	1950 (USMA)	29	(1928–2012)
88	William Y. Smith		1 Jul 1979	Chief of Staff, Supreme Headquarters Allied Powers Europe (COFS SHAPE), 1979–1981.; Deputy Commander in Chief, U.S. European Command (DCINCEUR), 1981–1983.	4	1948 (USMA)	31	(1925–2016)
89	Robert C. Mathis		1 Mar 1980	Vice Chief of Staff, U.S. Air Force (VCSAF), 1980–1982.	2	1948 (USMA)	32	(1927–2016)
90	Richard L. Lawson		1 Jul 1980	U.S. Military Representative, NATO Military Committee (USMILREP), 1980–1981.; Chief of Staff, Supreme Headquarters Allied Powers Europe (COFS SHAPE), 1981–1983.; Deputy Commander in Chief, U.S. European Command (DCINCEUR), 1983–1986.	6	1951 (ARNG)	29	(1929–2020)
91	Charles A. Gabriel		1 Aug 1980	Commander in Chief, U.S. Air Forces in Europe/Commander, Allied Air Forces Central Europe (CINCUSAFE/COMAAFCE), 1980–1982.; Chief of Staff, U.S. Air Force (CSAF), 1982–1986.	6	1950 (USMA)	30	(1928–2003)
92	Robert T. Marsh		1 Feb 1981	Commander, Air Force Systems Command (COMAFSC), 1981–1984.	3	1949 (USMA)	32	(1925–2017)
93	Thomas M. Ryan Jr.		31 Jul 1981	Commander, Air Training Command (COMATC), 1981–1983.; Commander in Chief, Military Airlift Command (CINCMAC), 1983–1985.	4	1950 (cadet)	31	(1928–2024)
94	James P. Mullins		1 Aug 1981	Commander, Air Force Logistics Command (COMAFLC), 1981–1984.	3	1949 (cadet)	32	(born 1928)
95	James V. Hartinger		1 Oct 1981	Commander in Chief, North American Air Defense Command (CINCNORAD), 1980–1981.; Commander in Chief, North American Aerospace Defense Command (CINCNORAD), 1981–1982.; Commander in Chief, North American Aerospace Defense Command/Commander, Air Force Space Command (CINCNORAD/COMAFSPC), 1982–1984.	3	1949 (USMA)	32	(1925–2000)
96	Jerome F. O'Malley		1 Jun 1982	Vice Chief of Staff, U.S. Air Force (VCSAF), 1982–1983.; Commander in Chief, Pacific Air Forces (CINCPACAF), 1983–1984.; Commander, Tactical Air Command (COMTAC), 1984–1985.	3	1953 (USMA)	29	(1932–1985) Died in office.
97	Billy M. Minter		1 Jul 1982	Commander in Chief, U.S. Air Forces in Europe/Commander, Allied Air Forces Central Europe (CINCUSAFE/COMAAFCE), 1982–1984.	2	1949 (cadet)	33	(1926–2005)
98	Andrew P. Iosue		1 Jul 1983	Commander, Air Training Command (COMATC), 1983–1986.	3	1951 (AFROTC)	32	(1927–2026)
99	James E. Dalton		1 Aug 1983	Chief of Staff, Supreme Headquarters Allied Powers Europe (COFS SHAPE), 1983–1985.	2	1954 (USMA)	29	(1930–2024)
100	Lawrence A. Skantze		6 Oct 1983	Vice Chief of Staff, U.S. Air Force (VCSAF), 1983–1984.; Commander, Air Force Systems Command (COMAFSC), 1984–1987.	4	1952 (USNA)	31	(1928–2018)
101	Larry D. Welch		1 Aug 1984	Vice Chief of Staff, U.S. Air Force (VCSAF), 1984–1985.; Commander in Chief, Strategic Air Command/Director, Joint Strategic Target Planning Staff (CINCSAC), 1985–1986.; Chief of Staff, U.S. Air Force (CSAF), 1986–1990.	6	1953 (cadet)	31	(born 1934) President, Institute for Defense Analyses, 1990–2003, 2006–2009.
102	Robert T. Herres		1 Aug 1984	Commander in Chief, North American Aerospace Defense Command/Commander, Air Force Space Command (CINCNORAD/COMAFSPC), 1984–1985.; Commander in Chief, North American Aerospace Defense Command/Commander in Chief, U.S. Space Command/Commander, Air Force Space Command (CINCNORAD/USCINCSPACE/COMAFSPC), 1985–1986.; Commander in Chief, North American Aerospace Defense Command/Commander in Chief, U.S. Space Command (CINCNORAD/USCINCSPACE), 1986–1987.; Vice Chairman, Joint Chiefs of Staff (VJCS), 1987–1990.	6	1954 (USNA)	30	(1932–2008)
103	Robert W. Bazley		1 Nov 1984	Commander in Chief, Pacific Air Forces (CINCPACAF), 1984–1986.	2	1945 (cadet)	29	(1925–2012)
104	Charles L. Donnelly Jr.		1 Nov 1984	Commander in Chief, U.S. Air Forces in Europe/Commander, Allied Air Forces Central Europe (CINCUSAFE/COMAAFCE), 1984–1987.	3	1952 (cadet)	32	(1929–1994) Executive Director, Air Force Association, 1988–1989.
105	Earl T. O'Loughlin		1 Nov 1984	Commander, Air Force Logistics Command (COMAFLC), 1984–1987.	3	1952 (cadet)	32	(1930–2023)
*	James H. Doolittle		4 Apr 1985	(retired)	0	1918 (cadet)	67	(1896–1993) Awarded Medal of Honor, 1942; Presidential Medal of Freedom, 1989. First Air Force reservist to attain rank of general.
*	Ira C. Eaker		26 Apr 1985	(retired)	0	1917 (direct)	68	(1896–1987) Awarded Congressional Gold Medal, 1978.
106	Robert D. Russ		22 May 1985	Commander, Tactical Air Command (COMTAC), 1985–1991.	6	1955 (AFROTC)	30	(1933–1997)
107	John T. Chain Jr.		1 Jul 1985	Chief of Staff, Supreme Headquarters Allied Powers Europe (COFS SHAPE), 1985–1986.; Commander in Chief, Strategic Air Command/Director, Joint Strategic Target Planning Staff (CINCSAC), 1986–1991.	6	1956 (AFROTC)	29	(1934–2021) U.S. Assistant Secretary of State for Politico-Military Affairs, 1984–1985.
108	John L. Piotrowski		1 Aug 1985	Vice Chief of Staff, U.S. Air Force (VCSAF), 1985–1987.; Commander in Chief, North American Aerospace Defense Command/Commander in Chief, U.S. Space Command (CINCNORAD/USCINCSPACE), 1987–1990.	5	1954 (cadet)	31	(born 1934)
109	Duane H. Cassidy		8 Nov 1985	Commander in Chief, Military Airlift Command (CINCMAC), 1985–1987.; Commander in Chief, U.S. Transportation Command/Commander in Chief, Military Airlift Command (USCINCTRANS/CINCMAC), 1987–1989.	4	1954 (cadet)	31	(1933–2016)
110	Robert H. Reed		1 Jul 1986	Chief of Staff, Supreme Headquarters Allied Powers Europe (COFS SHAPE), 1986–1988.	2	1953 (cadet)	33	(1929–2017)
111	Thomas C. Richards		1 Dec 1986	Deputy Commander in Chief, U.S. European Command (DCINCEUR), 1986–1989.	3	1956 (VPI)	30	(1930–2020) Administrator, Federal Aviation Administration, 1992–1993.
112	Jack I. Gregory		1 Jan 1987	Commander in Chief, Pacific Air Forces (CINCPACAF), 1986–1988.	1	1953 (AFROTC)	34	(born 1931)
113	Monroe W. Hatch Jr.		29 Jan 1987	Vice Chief of Staff, U.S. Air Force (VCSAF), 1987–1990.	3	1951 (USNA)	36	(born 1933) Executive Director, Air Force Association, 1990–1995.
114	William L. Kirk		1 May 1987	Commander in Chief, U.S. Air Forces in Europe/Commander, Allied Air Forces Central Europe (CINCUSAFE/COMAAFCE), 1987–1989.	2	1954 (cadet)	33	(1932–2017)
115	Bernard P. Randolph		1 Aug 1987	Commander, Air Force Systems Command (COMAFSC), 1987–1990.	3	1956 (cadet)	31	(1933–2021)
116	Alfred G. Hansen		1 Aug 1987	Commander, Air Force Logistics Command (COMAFLC), 1987–1989.	2	1955 (cadet)	32	(born 1933)
117	John A. Shaud		1 Jul 1988	Chief of Staff, Supreme Headquarters Allied Powers Europe (COFS SHAPE), 1988–1991.	3	1956 (USMA)	32	(born 1933) Executive Director, Air Force Association, 1995–2002.
118	Merrill A. McPeak		1 Aug 1988	Commander in Chief, Pacific Air Forces (CINCPACAF), 1988–1990.; Chief of Staff, U.S. Air Force (CSAF), 1990–1994.	6	1957 (AFROTC)	31	(born 1936) Chairman, American Battle Monuments Commission, 2010–2018.
119	Michael J. Dugan		1 May 1989	Commander in Chief, U.S. Air Forces in Europe/Commander, Allied Air Forces Central Europe (CINCUSAFE/COMAAFCE), 1989–1990.; Chief of Staff, U.S. Air Force (CSAF), 1990.; Special Assistant to the Secretary of the Air Force, 1990–1991.	2	1958 (USMA)	31	(born 1937) Relieved as chief of staff, 1990.
120	James P. McCarthy		1 Oct 1989	Deputy Commander in Chief, U.S. European Command (DCINCEUR), 1989–1992.	3	1957 (AFROTC)	32	(born 1935)
121	Hansford T. Johnson		1 Oct 1989	Commander in Chief, U.S. Transportation Command/Commander in Chief, Military Airlift Command (USCINCTRANS/CINCMAC), 1989–1992.; Commander in Chief, U.S. Transportation Command/Commander, Air Mobility Command (USCINCTRANS/COMAMC), 1992.	3	1959 (USAFA)	30	(born 1936) U.S. Assistant Secretary of the Navy for Installations and Environment, 2002–2005.
122	Charles C. McDonald		1 Nov 1989	Commander, Air Force Logistics Command (COMAFLC), 1989–1992.	3	1956 (AFROTC)	33	(1933–2017)
123	Donald J. Kutyna		1 Apr 1990	Commander in Chief, North American Aerospace Defense Command/Commander in Chief, U.S. Space Command (CINCNORAD/USCINCSPACE), 1990–1992.; Commander in Chief, North American Aerospace Defense Command/Commander in Chief, U.S. Space Command/Commander, Air Force Space Command (CINCNORAD/USCINCSPACE/COMAFSPC), 1992.	2	1957 (USMA)	33	(born 1933)
124	Ronald W. Yates		1 Apr 1990	Commander, Air Force Systems Command (COMAFSC), 1990–1992.; Commander, Air Force Materiel Command (COMAFMC), 1992–1995.	5	1960 (USAFA)	30	(born 1938)
125	John M. Loh		1 Jun 1990	Vice Chief of Staff, U.S. Air Force (VCSAF), 1990–1991.; Commander, Tactical Air Command (COMTAC), 1991–1992.; Commander, Air Combat Command (COMACC), 1992–1995.	5	1960 (USAFA)	30	(born 1938)
126	Robert C. Oaks		1 Jul 1990	Commander in Chief, U.S. Air Forces in Europe/Commander, Allied Air Forces Central Europe (CINCUSAFE/COMAAFCE), 1990–1993.; Commander in Chief, U.S. Air Forces in Europe/Commander, Allied Air Forces Central Europe (CINCUSAFE/COMAIRCENT), 1993–1994.	4	1959 (USAFA)	31	(born 1936)
127	George L. Butler		25 Jan 1991	Commander in Chief, Strategic Air Command/Director, Joint Strategic Target Planning Staff (CINCSAC), 1991–1992.; Commander in Chief, U.S. Strategic Command (USCINCSTRAT), 1992–1994.	3	1961 (USAFA)	30	(born 1939)
128	Jimmie V. Adams		13 Feb 1991	Commander in Chief, Pacific Air Forces (CINCPACAF), 1991–1993.	2	1958 (AFROTC)	33	(born 1936)
129	Michael P. C. Carns		16 May 1991	Vice Chief of Staff, U.S. Air Force (VCSAF), 1991–1994.	3	1959 (USAFA)	32	(1937–2023)
130	James B. Davis		24 Jul 1991	Chief of Staff, Supreme Headquarters Allied Powers Europe (COFS SHAPE), 1991–1993.	2	1958 (USNA)	33	(born 1935)
131	Chuck A. Horner		1 Jul 1992	Commander in Chief, North American Aerospace Defense Command/Commander in Chief, U.S. Space Command/Commander, Air Force Space Command (CINCNORAD/USCINCSPACE/COMAFSPC), 1992–1994.	2	1958 (AFROTC)	34	(born 1936)
132	Ronald R. Fogleman		1 Sep 1992	Commander in Chief, U.S. Transportation Command/Commander, Air Mobility Command (USCINCTRANS/COMAMC), 1992–1994.; Chief of Staff, U.S. Air Force (CSAF), 1994–1997.	5	1963 (USAFA)	29	(born 1942)
133	Charles G. Boyd		1 Dec 1992	Deputy Commander in Chief, U.S. European Command (DCINCEUR), 1992–1995.	3	1960 (cadet)	32	(1938–2022)
134	Henry Viccellio Jr.		1 Dec 1992	Commander, Air Training Command (COMATC), 1992–1993.; Commander, Air Education and Training Command (COMAETC), 1993–1995.; Commander, Air Force Materiel Command (COMAFMC), 1995–1997.	5	1963 (USAFA)	29	(born 1940)
135	Robert L. Rutherford		1 Feb 1993	Commander, Pacific Air Forces (COMPACAF), 1993–1994.; Commander in Chief, U.S. Transportation Command/Commander, Air Mobility Command (USCINCTRANS/COMAMC), 1994–1996.	3	1961 (AFROTC)	32	(1938–2013)
136	Thomas S. Moorman Jr.		1 Aug 1994	Vice Chief of Staff, U.S. Air Force (VCSAF), 1994–1997.	3	1962 (AFROTC)	32	(1940–2020)
137	James L. Jamerson		1 Sep 1994	Commander in Chief, U.S. Air Forces in Europe/Commander, Allied Air Forces Central Europe (CINCUSAFE/COMAIRCENT), 1994–1995.; Deputy Commander in Chief, U.S. European Command (DCINCEUR), 1995–1998.	4	1963 (USAFA)	31	(born 1941)
138	Joseph W. Ashy		13 Sep 1994	Commander in Chief, North American Aerospace Defense Command/Commander in Chief, U.S. Space Command/Commander, Air Force Space Command (CINCNORAD/USCINCSPACE/COMAFSPC), 1994–1996.	2	1962 (Texas A&M)	32	(born 1940)
139	John G. Lorber		12 Oct 1994	Commander, Pacific Air Forces (COMPACAF), 1994–1997.	3	1964 (USAFA)	30	(1941–2021)
140	Billy J. Boles		1 Jul 1995	Commander, Air Education and Training Command (COMAETC), 1995–1997.	2	1962 (AFROTC)	33	(1938–2021)
141	Joseph W. Ralston		1 Jul 1995	Commander, Air Combat Command (COMACC), 1995–1996.; Vice Chairman, Joint Chiefs of Staff (VJCS), 1996–2000.; Supreme Allied Commander, Europe/Commander in Chief, U.S. European Command (SACEUR/USCINCEUR), 2000–2003.	8	1965 (AFROTC)	30	(born 1943) U.S. Special Envoy for Countering the Kurdistan Workers Party (PKK), 2006–present. Son-in-law of Air Force four-star general Russell E. Dougherty.
142	Richard E. Hawley		1 Aug 1995	Commander in Chief, U.S. Air Forces in Europe/Commander, Allied Air Forces Central Europe (CINCUSAFE/COMAIRCENT), 1995–1996.; Commander, Air Combat Command (COMACC), 1996–1999.	4	1964 (USAFA)	31	(born 1942)
143	Eugene E. Habiger		1 Mar 1996	Commander in Chief, U.S. Strategic Command (USCINCSTRAT), 1996–1998.	2	1963 (OTS)	33	(1939–2022) Director of Security and Emergency Operations, U.S. Department of Energy, 1999–2001.
144	Michael E. Ryan		4 Apr 1996	Commander in Chief, U.S. Air Forces in Europe/Commander, Allied Air Forces Central Europe (CINCUSAFE/COMAIRCENT), 1996–1997.; Chief of Staff, U.S. Air Force (CSAF), 1997–2001.	5	1965 (USAFA)	31	(born 1941) Son of Air Force four-star general John D. Ryan.
145	Walter Kross		1 Aug 1996	Commander in Chief, U.S. Transportation Command/Commander, Air Mobility Command (USCINCTRANS/COMAMC), 1996–1998.	2	1964 (OTS)	32	(born 1942)
146	Howell M. Estes III		1 Oct 1996	Commander in Chief, North American Aerospace Defense Command/Commander in Chief, U.S. Space Command/Commander, Air Force Space Command (CINCNORAD/USCINCSPACE/COMAFSPC), 1996–1998.	2	1965 (USAFA)	31	(1941–2024) Son of Air Force four-star general Howell M. Estes Jr.
147	Lloyd W. Newton		1 Apr 1997	Commander, Air Education and Training Command (COMAETC), 1997–2000.	3	1966 (AFROTC)	31	(born 1942)
148	George T. Babbitt Jr.		1 Jun 1997	Commander, Air Force Materiel Command (COMAFMC), 1997–2000.	3	1965 (AFROTC)	32	(born 1942) Director, Defense Logistics Agency, 1996–1997.
149	Ralph E. Eberhart		1 Aug 1997	Vice Chief of Staff, U.S. Air Force (VCSAF), 1997–1999.; Commander, Air Combat Command (COMACC), 1999–2000.; Commander in Chief, North American Aerospace Defense Command/Commander in Chief, U.S. Space Command/Commander, Air Force Space Command (CINCNORAD/USCINCSPACE/COMAFSPC), 2000–2002.; Commander in Chief, North American Aerospace Defense Command/Commander in Chief, U.S. Northern Command (CINCNORAD/USCINCNORTH), 2002.; Commander, North American Aerospace Defense Command/Commander, U.S. Northern Command (CDRNORAD/CDRUSNORTHCOM), 2002–2004.	7	1968 (USAFA)	29	(born 1946)
150	Richard B. Myers		1 Sep 1997	Commander, Pacific Air Forces (COMPACAF), 1997–1998.; Commander in Chief, North American Aerospace Defense Command/Commander in Chief, U.S. Space Command/Commander, Air Force Space Command (CINCNORAD/USCINCSPACE/COMAFSPC), 1998–2000.; Vice Chairman, Joint Chiefs of Staff (VJCS), 2000–2001.; Chairman, Joint Chiefs of Staff (CJCS), 2001–2005.	8	1965 (AFROTC)	32	(born 1942) President, Kansas State University, 2016–2022. Awarded Presidential Medal of Freedom, 2005.
151	John A. Gordon		31 Oct 1997	Deputy Director of Central Intelligence (DDCI), 1997–2000.	3	1968 (AFROTC)	29	(1946–2020) U.S. Deputy Undersecretary of Defense for Policy, 1993–1994; U.S. Undersecretary of Energy for Nuclear Security, 2000–2002; Deputy National Security Advisor for Combating Terrorism, 2002–2003; Homeland Security Advisor, 2003–2004.
152	John P. Jumper		17 Nov 1997	Commander in Chief, U.S. Air Forces in Europe/Commander, Allied Air Forces Central Europe (CINCUSAFE/COMAIRCENT), 1997–2000.; Commander, Air Combat Command (COMACC), 2000–2001.; Chief of Staff, U.S. Air Force (CSAF), 2001–2005.	8	1966 (VMI)	31	(born 1945)
153	Charles T. Robertson Jr.		1 Sep 1998	Commander in Chief, U.S. Transportation Command/Commander, Air Mobility Command (USCINCTRANS/COMAMC), 1998–2001.	3	1968 (USAFA)	30	(born 1946)
154	Patrick K. Gamble		1 Oct 1998	Commander, Pacific Air Forces (COMPACAF), 1998–2001.	3	1967 (Texas A&M)	31	(born 1945) President, University of Alaska System, 2010–2015.
*	Benjamin O. Davis Jr.		9 Dec 1998	(retired)	0	1936 (USMA)	62	(1912–2002) Director of Aviation Security, 1970–1971; U.S. Assistant Secretary of Transportation for Safety and Consumer Affairs, 1971–1975.
155	Lester L. Lyles		1 Jul 1999	Vice Chief of Staff, U.S. Air Force (VCSAF), 1999–2000.; Commander, Air Force Materiel Command (COMAFMC), 2000–2003.	4	1968 (AFROTC)	31	(born 1946) Director, Ballistic Missile Defense Organization, 1996–1999.
156	Gregory S. Martin		1 Jun 2000	Commander in Chief, U.S. Air Forces in Europe/Commander, Allied Air Forces Northern Europe (CINCUSAFE/COMAIRNORTH), 2000–2002.; Commander, U.S. Air Forces in Europe/Commander, Allied Air Forces Northern Europe (COMUSAFE/COMAIRNORTH), 2002–2003.; Commander, Air Force Materiel Command (COMAFMC), 2003–2005.	5	1970 (USAFA)	30	(born 1948)
157	John W. Handy		1 Jul 2000	Vice Chief of Staff, U.S. Air Force (VCSAF), 2000–2001.; Commander in Chief, U.S. Transportation Command/Commander, Air Mobility Command (USCINCTRANS/COMAMC), 2001–2002.; Commander, U.S. Transportation Command/Commander, Air Mobility Command (CDRUSTRANSCOM/COMAMC), 2002–2005.	5	1967 (OTS)	33	(born 1944)
158	Hal M. Hornburg		1 Aug 2000	Commander, Air Education and Training Command (COMAETC), 2000–2001.; Commander, Air Combat Command/Air Component Commander for U.S. Joint Forces Command (COMACC/AIRUSJFCOM), 2001–2002.; Commander, Air Combat Command/Air Component Commander for U.S. Joint Forces Command and U.S. Northern Command (COMACC/AIRUSJFCOM-USNORTHCOM), 2002–2004.	4	1968 (Texas A&M)	32	(born 1945)
159	Charles R. Holland		1 Dec 2000	Commander in Chief, U.S. Special Operations Command (USCINCSOC), 2000–2002.; Commander, U.S. Special Operations Command (CDRUSSOCOM), 2002–2003.	3	1968 (USAFA)	32	(born 1946)
160	William J. Begert		1 May 2001	Commander, Pacific Air Forces/Air Component Commander for the Commander in Chief, U.S. Pacific Command (COMPACAF/AIRCINCUSPACOM), 2001–2002.; Commander, Pacific Air Forces/Air Component Commander for the Commander, U.S. Pacific Command (COMPACAF/AIRCDRUSPACOM), 2002–2004.	3	1968 (USAFA)	33	(born 1946)
161	Robert H. Foglesong		5 Nov 2001	Vice Chief of Staff, U.S. Air Force (VCSAF), 2001–2003.; Commander, U.S. Air Forces in Europe/Commander, Allied Air Forces Northern Europe (COMUSAFE/COMAIRNORTH), 2003–2004.; Commander, U.S. Air Forces in Europe (COMUSAFE), 2004–2005.	4	1972 (AFROTC)	29	(born 1945) President, Mississippi State University, 2006–2008.
162	Donald G. Cook		17 Dec 2001	Commander, Air Education and Training Command (COMAETC), 2001–2005.	4	1969 (AFROTC)	32	(born 1946)
163	Lance W. Lord		19 Apr 2002	Commander, Air Force Space Command (COMAFSPC), 2002–2006.	4	1968 (AFROTC)	34	(born 1946)
164	Charles F. Wald		1 Jan 2003	Deputy Commander, U.S. European Command (DCINCEUR), 2002–2006.	4	1971 (AFROTC)	32	(born 1948)
165	T. Michael Moseley		1 Oct 2003	Vice Chief of Staff, U.S. Air Force (VCSAF), 2003–2005.; Chief of Staff, U.S. Air Force (CSAF), 2005–2008.	5	1971 (Texas A&M)	32	(born 1949) Resigned, 2008.
166	Paul V. Hester		1 Aug 2004	Commander, Pacific Air Forces/Air Component Commander for the Commander, U.S. Pacific Command (COMPACAF/AIRCDRUSPACOM), 2004–2007.	3	1971 (AFROTC)	33	(born 1947)
167	Michael V. Hayden		21 Apr 2005	Principal Deputy Director of National Intelligence (PDDNI), 2005–2006.; Director, Central Intelligence Agency (DCIA), 2006–2009.	4	1969 (AFROTC)	36	(born 1945) Director, National Security Agency, 1999–2005.
168	Ronald E. Keys		27 May 2005	Commander, Air Combat Command/Air Component Commander for U.S. Joint Forces Command and U.S. Northern Command (COMACC/AIRUSJFCOM-USNORTHCOM), 2005–2007.	2	1967 (AFROTC)	38	(born 1945)
169	William R. Looney III		1 Aug 2005	Commander, Air Education and Training Command (COMAETC), 2005–2008.	3	1972 (USAFA)	33	(born 1949)
170	Bruce A. Carlson		1 Sep 2005	Commander, Air Force Materiel Command (COMAFMC), 2005–2008.	3	1971 (AFROTC)	34	(born 1949) Director, National Reconnaissance Office, 2009–2012.
171	Norton A. Schwartz		1 Oct 2005	Commander, U.S. Transportation Command (CDRUSTRANSCOM), 2005–2008.; Chief of Staff, U.S. Air Force (CSAF), 2008–2012.	7	1973 (USAFA)	32	(born 1951) President, Institute for Defense Analyses, 2020–present.
172	John D. W. Corley		1 Nov 2005	Vice Chief of Staff, U.S. Air Force (VCSAF), 2005–2007.; Commander, Air Combat Command/Air Component Commander for U.S. Joint Forces Command (COMACC/AIRUSJFCOM), 2007–2009.	4	1973 (USAFA)	32	(born 1951)
173	Lance L. Smith		7 Nov 2005	Supreme Allied Commander, Transformation/Commander, U.S. Joint Forces Command (SACT/CDRUSJFCOM), 2005–2007.	2	1970 (OTS)	35	(born 1946)
174	Duncan J. McNabb		1 Dec 2005	Commander, Air Mobility Command (COMAMC), 2005–2007.; Vice Chief of Staff, U.S. Air Force (VCSAF), 2007–2008.; Commander, U.S. Transportation Command (CDRUSTRANSCOM), 2008–2011.	6	1974 (USAFA)	31	(born 1952)
175	William T. Hobbins		1 Feb 2006	Commander, U.S. Air Forces in Europe/Commander, Air Component Command, Ramstein/Director, Joint Air Power Competence Center (COMUSAFE/COMAIR-COM Ramstein/DIRJAPCC), 2005–2007.	1	1969 (OTS)	37	(born 1946)
176	Kevin P. Chilton		26 Jun 2006	Commander, Air Force Space Command (COMAFSPC), 2006–2007.; Commander, U.S. Strategic Command (CDRUSSTRATCOM), 2007–2011.	5	1976 (USAFA)	30	(born 1954) First astronaut to attain rank of general.
177	Victor E. Renuart Jr.		23 Mar 2007	Commander, North American Aerospace Defense Command/Commander, U.S. Northern Command (CDRNORAD/CDRUSNORTHCOM), 2007–2010.	3	1972 (OTS)	35	(born 1949)
178	Arthur J. Lichte		7 Sep 2007	Commander, Air Mobility Command (COMAMC), 2007–2009.	2	1971 (AFROTC)	36	(born 1949)
179	C. Robert Kehler		12 Oct 2007	Commander, Air Force Space Command (COMAFSPC), 2007–2011.; Commander, U.S. Strategic Command (CDRUSSTRATCOM), 2011–2013.	6	1975 (AFROTC)	32	(born 1952)
180	Carrol H. Chandler		30 Nov 2007	Commander, Pacific Air Forces/Air Component Commander for U.S. Pacific Command/Executive Director, Pacific Air Combat Operations Staff (COMPACAF/AIRCDRUSPACOM/EXDIRPACOPS), 2007–2009.; Vice Chief of Staff, U.S. Air Force (VCSAF), 2009–2011.	4	1974 (USAFA)	33	(born 1952)
181	Roger A. Brady		9 Jan 2008	Commander, U.S. Air Forces in Europe/Commander, Air Component Command, Ramstein/Director, Joint Air Power Competence Center (COMUSAFE/COMAIR-COM Ramstein/DIRJAPCC), 2008–2010.	2	1968 (AFROTC)	40	(born 1946)
182	Stephen R. Lorenz		2 Jul 2008	Commander, Air Education and Training Command (COMAETC), 2008–2010.	2	1973 (USAFA)	35	(born 1951)
183	William M. Fraser III		9 Oct 2008	Vice Chief of Staff, U.S. Air Force (VCSAF), 2008–2009.; Commander, Air Combat Command/Air Component Commander for U.S. Joint Forces Command (COMACC/AIRUSJFCOM), 2009–2011.; Commander, Air Combat Command (COMACC), 2011.; Commander, U.S. Transportation Command (CDRUSTRANSCOM), 2011–2014.	6	1974 (Texas A&M)	34	(born 1952)
184	Craig R. McKinley		17 Nov 2008	Chief, National Guard Bureau (CNGB), 2008–2012.	4	1974 (AFROTC)	34	(born 1952) President, Air Force Association, 2012–2015. First National Guard officer to achieve the rank of general.
185	Donald J. Hoffman		21 Nov 2008	Commander, Air Force Materiel Command (COMAFMC), 2008–2012.	4	1974 (USAFA)	34	(born 1952)
186	Douglas M. Fraser		25 Jun 2009	Commander, U.S. Southern Command (CDRUSSOUTHCOM), 2009–2012.	3	1975 (USAFA)	34	(born 1953)
187	Gary L. North		19 Aug 2009	Commander, Pacific Air Forces/Air Component Commander for U.S. Pacific Command/Executive Director, Pacific Air Combat Operations Staff (COMPACAF/AIRCDRUSPACOM/EXDIRPACOPS), 2009–2012.	3	1976 (AFROTC)	33	(born 1954)
188	Raymond E. Johns Jr.		20 Nov 2009	Commander, Air Mobility Command (COMAMC), 2009–2012.	3	1977 (USAFA)	32	(born 1954)
189	Edward A. Rice Jr.		17 Nov 2010	Commander, Air Education and Training Command (COMAETC), 2010–2013.	3	1978 (USAFA)	32	(born 1956)
190	Mark A. Welsh III		13 Dec 2010	Commander, U.S. Air Forces in Europe/Commander, Air Component Command, Ramstein/Director, Joint Air Power Competence Center (COMUSAFE/COMAIR-COM Ramstein/DIRJAPCC), 2010–2012.; Chief of Staff, U.S. Air Force (CSAF), 2012–2016.	6	1976 (USAFA)	34	(born 1953) Dean, Bush School of Government and Public Service, 2016–2023; President, Texas A&M University, 2023–2025.
191	William L. Shelton		5 Jan 2011	Commander, Air Force Space Command (COMAFSPC), 2011–2014.	3	1976 (USAFA)	35	(born 1954)
192	Philip M. Breedlove		14 Jan 2011	Vice Chief of Staff, U.S. Air Force (VCSAF), 2011–2012.; Commander, U.S. Air Forces in Europe/Commander, U.S. Air Forces Africa/Commander, Air Component Command, Ramstein/Director, Joint Air Power Competence Center (COMUSAFE/COMAFAFRICA/COMAIR-COM Ramstein/DIRJAPCC), 2012–2013.; Commander, U.S. Air Forces in Europe/Commander, U.S. Air Forces Africa/Commander, Allied Air Command/Director, Joint Air Power Competence Center (COMUSAFE/COMAFAFRICA/AIRCOM/DIRJAPCC), 2013.; Commander, U.S. European Command/Supreme Allied Commander Europe (CDRUSEUCOM/SACEUR), 2013–2016.	5	1977 (AFROTC)	34	(born 1955)
193	Gilmary M. Hostage III		13 Sep 2011	Commander, Air Combat Command (COMACC), 2011–2014.	3	1977 (AFROTC)	34	(born 1955)
194	Janet C. Wolfenbarger		5 Jun 2012	Commander, Air Force Materiel Command (COMAFMC), 2012–2015.	3	1980 (USAFA)	32	(born 1958) First woman to achieve the rank of general in the Air Force.
195	Larry O. Spencer		27 Jul 2012	Vice Chief of Staff, U.S. Air Force (VCSAF), 2012–2015.	3	1980 (OTS)	32	(born 1954) President, Air Force Association, 2015–2019. Served nine years in the enlisted ranks before receiving his commission in 1980.
196	Herbert J. Carlisle		2 Aug 2012	Commander, Pacific Air Forces/Air Component Commander for U.S. Pacific Command/Executive Director, Pacific Air Combat Operations Staff (COMPACAF/AIRCDRUSPACOM/EXDIRPACOPS), 2012–2014.; Commander, Air Combat Command (COMACC), 2014–2017.	5	1978 (USAFA)	34	(born 1957)
197	Paul J. Selva		29 Nov 2012	Commander, Air Mobility Command (COMAMC), 2012–2014.; Commander, U.S. Transportation Command (CDRUSTRANSCOM), 2014–2015.; Vice Chairman, Joint Chiefs of Staff (VJCS), 2015–2019.	7	1980 (USAFA)	32	(born 1958)
198	Frank Gorenc		2 Aug 2013	Commander, U.S. Air Forces in Europe/Commander, U.S. Air Forces Africa/Commander, Allied Air Command/Director, Joint Air Power Competence Center (COMUSAFE/COMAFAFRICA/AIRCOM/DIRJAPCC), 2013–2016.	3	1979 (USAFA)	34	(born 1957)
199	Robin Rand		10 Oct 2013	Commander, Air Education and Training Command (COMAETC), 2013–2015.; Commander, Air Force Global Strike Command (COMAFGSC), 2015–2017.; Commander, Air Force Global Strike Command/Commander, Air Forces Strategic- Air, U.S. Strategic Command (COMAFGSC/COMAFSTRATAIR), 2017–2018.	5	1979 (USAFA)	34	(born 1958)
200	Darren W. McDew		5 May 2014	Commander, Air Mobility Command (COMAMC), 2014–2015.; Commander, U.S. Transportation Command (CDRUSTRANSCOM), 2015–2018.	4	1982 (VMI)	32	(born 1960)
201	John E. Hyten		15 Aug 2014	Commander, Air Force Space Command (COMAFSPC), 2014–2016.; Commander, U.S. Strategic Command (CDRUSSTRATCOM), 2016–2019.; Vice Chairman, Joint Chiefs of Staff (VJCS), 2019–2021.	7	1981 (AFROTC)	33	(born 1959)
202	Lori J. Robinson		16 Oct 2014	Commander, Pacific Air Forces/Air Component Commander for U.S. Pacific Command/Executive Director, Pacific Air Combat Operations Staff (COMPACAF/AIRCDRUSPACOM/EXDIRPACOPS), 2014–2016.; Commander, North American Aerospace Defense Command/Commander, U.S. Northern Command (CDRNORAD/CDRUSNORTHCOM), 2016–2018.	4	1981 (AFROTC)	33	(born 1959) First woman in any service to lead a unified combatant command.
203	Ellen M. Pawlikowski		8 Jun 2015	Commander, Air Force Materiel Command (COMAFMC), 2015–2018.	3	1978 (AFROTC)	37	(born 1956)
204	Carlton D. Everhart II		11 Aug 2015	Commander, Air Mobility Command (COMAMC), 2015–2018.	3	1983 (Virginia Tech)	32	(born 1961)
205	David L. Goldfein		17 Aug 2015	Vice Chief of Staff, U.S. Air Force (VCSAF), 2015–2016.; Chief of Staff, U.S. Air Force (CSAF), 2016–2020.	5	1983 (USAFA)	32	(born 1959)
206	Terrence J. O'Shaughnessy		12 Jul 2016	Commander, Pacific Air Forces/Air Component Commander for U.S. Pacific Command/Executive Director, Pacific Air Combat Operations Staff (COMPACAF/AIRCDRUSPACOM/EXDIRPACOPS), 2016–2018.; Commander, North American Aerospace Defense Command/Commander, U.S. Northern Command (CDRNORAD/CDRUSNORTHCOM), 2018–2020.	4	1986 (USAFA)	30	(born 1964)
207	Stephen W. Wilson		22 Jul 2016	Vice Chief of Staff, U.S. Air Force (VCSAF), 2016–2020.	4	1981 (Texas A&M)	35	(born 1959/1960)
208	Joseph L. Lengyel		3 Aug 2016	Chief, National Guard Bureau (CNGB), 2016–2020.	4	1981 (AFROTC)	35	(born 1959)
209	Tod D. Wolters		11 Aug 2016	Commander, U.S. Air Forces in Europe/Commander, U.S. Air Forces Africa/Commander, Allied Air Command/Director, Joint Air Power Competence Center (COMUSAFE/COMAFAFRICA/AIRCOM/DIRJAPCC), 2016–2019.; Commander, U.S. European Command/Supreme Allied Commander Europe (CDRUSEUCOM/SACEUR), 2019–2022.	6	1982 (USAFA)	34	(born c. 1961)
210	John W. Raymond		25 Oct 2016	Commander, Air Force Space Command (COMAFSPC), 2016–2017.; Commander, Air Force Space Command/Joint Force Space Component Commander (COMAFSPC/JFSCC), 2017–2019.; Commander, U.S. Space Command/Commander, Air Force Space Command (CDRUSSPACECOM/COMAFSPC), 2019.	3	1984 (AFROTC)	32	(born 1962) Chief of Space Operations, 2019–2022.
211	James M. Holmes		10 Mar 2017	Commander, Air Combat Command (COMACC), 2017–2020.	3	1981 (OTS)	36	(born 1957)
212	Charles Q. Brown Jr.		26 Jul 2018	Commander, Pacific Air Forces/Air Component Commander for U.S. Indo-Pacific Command/Executive Director, Pacific Air Combat Operations Staff (COMPACAF/AIRCDRUSINDOPACOM/EXDIRPACOPS), 2018–2020.; Chief of Staff, U.S. Air Force (CSAF), 2020–2023.; Chairman, Joint Chiefs of Staff (CJCS), 2023–2025.	7	1985 (AFROTC)	33	(born 1962) Relieved, 2025.
213	Timothy M. Ray		21 Aug 2018	Commander, Air Force Global Strike Command/Commander, Air Forces Strategic- Air, U.S. Strategic Command (COMAFGSC/COMAFSTRATAIR), 2018–2021.	3	1985 (USAFA)	33	(born 1963)
214	Maryanne Miller		7 Sep 2018	Commander, Air Mobility Command (COMAMC), 2018–2020.	2	1981 (AFROTC)	37	(born 1961) First Air Force Reserve officer to achieve the rank of general.
215	Jeffrey L. Harrigian		1 May 2019	Commander, U.S. Air Forces in Europe/Commander, U.S. Air Forces Africa/Commander, Allied Air Command/Director, Joint Air Power Competence Center (COMUSAFE/COMAFAFRICA/AIRCOM/DIRJAPCC), 2019.; Commander, U.S. Air Forces in Europe - Air Forces Africa/Commander, Allied Air Command/Director, Joint Air Power Competence Center (COMUSAFE/COMAFAFRICA/AIRCOM/DIRJAPCC), 2019–2022.	3	1985 (USAFA)	34	(born c. 1962)
216	Arnold W. Bunch Jr.		31 May 2019	Commander, Air Force Materiel Command (COMAFMC), 2019–2022.	3	1984 (USAFA)	35	(born 1962)
217	Kenneth S. Wilsbach		8 Jul 2020	Commander, Pacific Air Forces/Air Component Commander for U.S. Indo-Pacific Command/Executive Director, Pacific Air Combat Operations Staff (COMPACAF/AIRCDRUSINDOPACOM/EXDIRPACOPS), 2020–2024.; Commander, Air Combat Command (COMACC), 2024–2025.; Chief of Staff, U.S. Air Force (CSAF), 2025–present.	6	1985 (AFROTC)	35	(born c. 1963)
218	Glen D. VanHerck		20 Aug 2020	Commander, North American Aerospace Defense Command/Commander, U.S. Northern Command (CDRNORAD/CDRUSNORTHCOM), 2020–2024.	4	1987 (AFROTC)	33	(born 1962)
219	Jacqueline D. Van Ovost		20 Aug 2020	Commander, Air Mobility Command (COMAMC), 2020–2021.; Commander, U.S. Transportation Command (CDRUSTRANSCOM), 2021–2024.	4	1988 (USAFA)	32	(born 1965)
220	Mark D. Kelly		28 Aug 2020	Commander, Air Combat Command (COMACC), 2020–2024.	4	1986 (AFROTC)	34	(born c. 1962)
221	David W. Allvin		12 Nov 2020	Vice Chief of Staff, U.S. Air Force (VCSAF), 2020–2023.; Chief of Staff, U.S. Air Force (CSAF), 2023–2025.	5	1986 (USAFA)	34	(born c. 1963)
222	Anthony J. Cotton		27 Aug 2021	Commander, Air Force Global Strike Command/Commander, Air Forces Strategic- Air, U.S. Strategic Command (COMAFGSC/COMAFSTRATAIR), 2021–2022.; Commander, U.S. Strategic Command (CDRUSSTRATCOM), 2022–2025.	4	1986 (AFROTC)	35	
223	Michael A. Minihan		5 Oct 2021	Commander, Air Mobility Command (COMAMC), 2021–2024.	3	1989 (AFROTC)	32	(born c. 1967)
224	Duke Z. Richardson		13 Jun 2022	Commander, Air Force Materiel Command (COMAFMC), 2022–2025.	3	1989 (OTS)	33	(born c. 1964)
225	James B. Hecker		27 Jun 2022	Commander, U.S. Air Forces in Europe - Air Forces Africa/Commander, Allied Air Command/Director, Joint Air Power Competence Center (COMUSAFE/COMAFAFRICA/AIRCOM/DIRJAPCC), 2022–2025.	3	1989 (USAFA)	33	
226	Thomas A. Bussiere		7 Dec 2022	Commander, Air Force Global Strike Command/Commander, Air Forces Strategic- Air, U.S. Strategic Command (COMAFGSC/COMAFSTRATAIR), 2022–present.	4	1985 (Norwich)	37	(born c. 1963)
227	James C. Slife		19 Dec 2023	Vice Chief of Staff, U.S. Air Force (VCSAF), 2023–2025.	2	1989 (AFROTC)	34	(born c. 1967) Relieved, 2025.
228	Timothy D. Haugh		2 Feb 2024	Commander, U.S. Cyber Command/Director, National Security Agency/Chief, Central Security Service (CDRUSCYBERCOM/DIRNSA/CCSS), 2024–2025.	1	1991 (AFROTC)	33	(1969– ) Relieved, 2025.
229	Gregory M. Guillot		5 Feb 2024	Commander, North American Aerospace Defense Command/Commander, U.S. Northern Command (CDRNORAD/CDRUSNORTHCOM), 2024–present.	2	1989 (USAFA)	35	
230	Kevin B. Schneider		9 Feb 2024	Commander, Pacific Air Forces/Air Component Commander for U.S. Indo-Pacific Command/Executive Director, Pacific Air Combat Operations Staff (COMPACAF/AIRCDRUSINDOPACOM/EXDIRPACOPS), 2024–2026.; Commander, Pacific Air Forces/Air Component Commander for U.S. Pacific Command/Executive Director, Pacific Air Combat Operations Staff (COMPACAF/AIRCDRUSPACOM/EXDIRPACOPS), 2026–present.	2	1988 (USAFA)	36	
231	John D. Lamontagne		7 Sep 2024	Commander, Air Mobility Command (COMAMC), 2024–2026.; Vice Chief of Staff, U.S. Air Force (VCSAF), 2026–present.	2	1992 (USAFA)	32	(born c. 1970)
232	Steven S. Nordhaus		2 Oct 2024	Chief, National Guard Bureau (CNGB), 2024–present.	2	1989 (USAFA)	35	(born 1966)
233	Randall Reed		4 Oct 2024	Commander, U.S. Transportation Command (CDRUSTRANSCOM), 2024–present.	2	1989 (USAFA)	35	(born c. 1967)
234	J. Daniel Caine		11 Apr 2025	Chairman, Joint Chiefs of Staff (CJCS), 2025–present.	1	1990 (VMI)	35	(born 1968)
235	Alexus G. Grynkewich		1 Jul 2025	Commander, U.S. European Command/Supreme Allied Commander Europe (CDRUSEUCOM/SACEUR), 2025–present.	1	1993 (USAFA)	32	(born 1971)
236	Adrian L. Spain		11 Aug 2025	Commander, Air Combat Command (COMACC), 2025–present.	1	1994 (AFROTC)	31	
237	Dagvin R. M. Anderson		15 Aug 2025	Commander, U.S. Africa Command (CDRUSAFRICOM), 2025–present.	1	1992 (AFROTC)	33	(born 1970)
238	Stephen L. Davis		4 Nov 2025	Commander, Air Force Global Strike Command/Commander, Air Forces Strategic- Air, U.S. Strategic Command (COMAFGSC/COMAFSTRATAIR), 2025–present.	1	1989 (OTS)	36	(born c. 1967)
239	Dale R. White		19 Dec 2025	Direct Reporting Portfolio Manager for Critical Major Weapon Systems Programs (CMWS DRPM), 2025–present.	1	1997 (AFROTC)	28	(born c. 1971)

== History ==
=== 1943–1991 ===
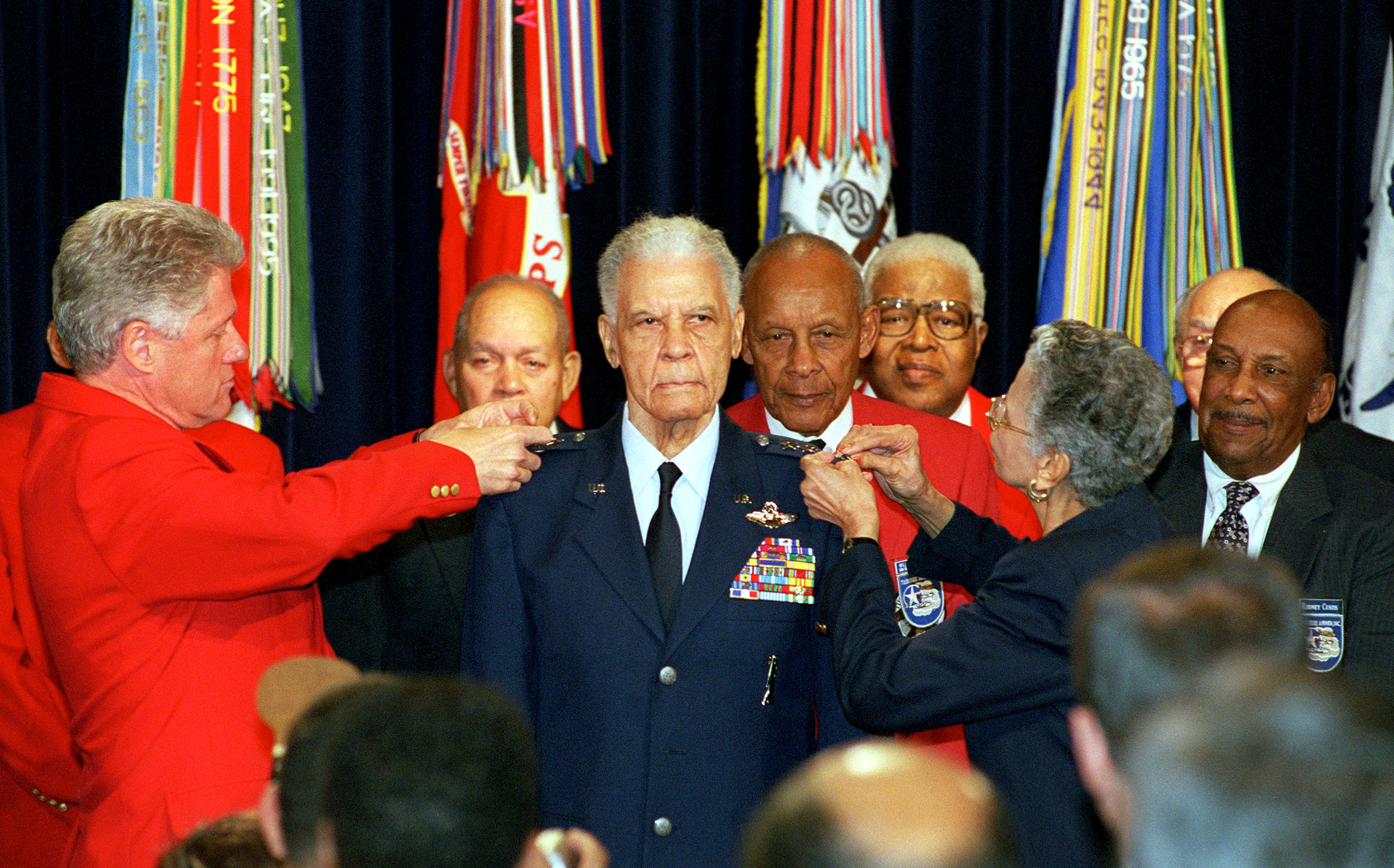
Retired Air Force Gen. Benjamin O. Davis Jr. is pinned with his fourth star on 10 December 1998.

The modern rank of general was established by the Officer Personnel Act of 1947, which authorized the President to designate certain positions of importance to carry that rank. Officers appointed to such positions bear temporary four-star rank while so serving, and are allowed to retire at that rank if their performance is judged satisfactory. The total number of active-duty four-star generals in the Air Force is limited to a fixed percentage of the number of Air Force general officers serving at all ranks.

Within the Air Force, the chief of staff (CSAF) and vice chief of staff (VCSAF) are four-star generals by statute. Other four-star generals occupy positions of designated importance; historically, these have included the commanders responsible for strategic bombers and nuclear missiles (SAC/STRATCOM); tactical air combat (TAC/ACC); air transport (MAC/TRANSCOM); North American aerospace defense (NORAD); the Air Force formations in Europe and the Pacific; and other training, readiness, and materiel organizations.

The Air Force also competes with the other services for a number of joint four-star positions, such as the chairman (CJCS) and vice chairman (VJCS) of the Joint Chiefs of Staff. Other joint four-star positions have included unified combatant commanders and certain NATO staff positions.

== Legislation ==
The following list of Congressional legislation includes major acts of Congress pertaining to appointments to the grade of general in the United States Air Force.

Legislation	Citation	Summary
Act of 26 July 1947 [National Security Act of 1947]	61 Stat. 503	Established U.S. Air Force.
Act of 7 August 1947 [Officer Personnel Act of 1947]	61 Stat. 886	Authorized president to designate, subject to Senate confirmation, Air Force officers to have the rank of general while assigned to positions of importance and responsibility.; Capped Air Force positions with ranks above major general at 15 percent of the total number of general officers serving on active federal military duty, of which not more than 25 percent to carry the rank of general.
Act of 26 June 1948	62 Stat. 1052	Authorized permanent grade of general and full active-duty pay and allowances in retirement for Carl A. Spaatz.
Act of 12 December 1980 [Defense Officer Personnel Management Act]	94 Stat. 2844; 94 Stat. 2849; 94 Stat. 2876	Authorized president to designate positions of importance and responsibility to carry the grade of general, to be assigned from officers on active duty in any grade above colonel, subject to Senate confirmation, who revert to their permanent grade at the end of their assignment unless it was terminated by; 1. assignment to another position designated to carry the same grade, 2. up to 180 days of hospitalization, or; 3. up to 90 days prior to retirement [reduced to 60 days in 1991 (105 Stat. 1354)].; Capped, except during war or national emergency, Air Force officers in grades above major general at 15 percent of all general officers on active duty, of whom not more than 25 percent to serve in the grade of general.; Authorized three- and four-star officers to retire in the highest grade held on active duty, at the discretion of the president and subject to confirmation by the Senate, with no time-in-grade requirement [changed in 1996 to certification by secretary of defense and three-year time-in-grade requirement (110 Stat. 292)].
Act of 17 October 1998	112 Stat. 2035	Authorized promotion of Benjamin O. Davis Jr. to general on the retired list, with no increase in compensation or benefits.
Act of 28 January 2008	122 Stat. 496	Increased grade of chief of the National Guard Bureau to general.
Act of 28 October 2009	123 Stat. 2273; 123 Stat. 2274; 123 Stat. 2276	Capped Air Force officers in the grade of general at 9, exempting from caps the chief of the National Guard Bureau and up to 20 generals assigned to joint duty [joint-duty cap repealed in 2016, effective 31 December 2022 (130 Stat. 2100), and lowered in 2021 to 19 (134 Stat. 3563)].
Act of 20 December 2019	133 Stat. 1561	Redesignated Air Force Space Command as U.S. Space Force.

== See also ==
- General (United States)
- List of active duty United States four-star officers
- List of United States Army four-star generals
- List of United States Coast Guard four-star admirals
- List of United States Marine Corps four-star generals
- List of United States Navy four-star admirals
- List of United States Space Force four-star generals
- List of United States Public Health Service Commissioned Corps four-star admirals
- List of United States military leaders by rank
- List of Royal Air Force air chief marshals
- List of lieutenant generals in the United States Air Force before 1960
- List of United States Air Force lieutenant generals from 2000 to 2009
- List of United States Air Force lieutenant generals from 2010 to 2019
- List of United States Air Force lieutenant generals since 2020
