= List of lieutenant generals in the United States Air Force before 1960 =

This is a complete list of lieutenant generals in the United States Air Force before 1960, including those appointed in the United States Army from the United States Army Air Forces or United States Army Air Corps before the Air Force was established in 1947. The grade of lieutenant general (or three-star general) is ordinarily the second-highest in the peacetime Air Force, ranking above major general and below general.

== List of U.S. Air Force lieutenant generals before 1960 ==
The following list of lieutenant generals includes all officers of the United States Air Force, United States Army Air Forces, and United States Army Air Corps who were appointed to that rank prior to January 1, 1960.

Entries are indexed by the numerical order in which each officer was appointed to that rank while on active duty, or by an asterisk (*) if the officer did not serve in that rank while on active duty. Each entry lists the officer's name, date of rank, date the officer vacated the active-duty rank, number of years on active duty as lieutenant general (Yrs), positions held as lieutenant general, and other biographical notes.

Italics denote active duty as lieutenant general while on the retired list.

	Name	Photo	Date of rank	Date vacated	Yrs	Position	Notes
1	Delos C. Emmons		25 Oct 1940	30 Jun 1948	8	Commanding General, General Headquarters Air Force, 1940–1941.; Commanding General, Air Force Combat Command, 1941.; Commanding General, Hawaiian Department, 1941–1943.; Commanding General, Western Defense Command, 1943–1944.; Commanding General, Alaskan Department, 1944–1946.; Commandant, Armed Forces Staff College, 1946–1948.	(1888–1965)
2	Frank M. Andrews		19 Sep 1941	3 May 1943	2	Commanding General, Panama Canal Department/Caribbean Defense Command, 1941–1942.; Commanding General, U.S. Army Forces in the Middle East, 1942–1943.; Commanding General, European Theater of Operations, U.S. Army, 1943.	(1884–1943) Died in office.
3	Henry H. Arnold		15 Dec 1941	19 Mar 1943	1	Additional Chief of Staff for Air, 1941–1942.; Commanding General, Army Air Forces, 1942–1946.	(1886–1950) Promoted to general, 19 Mar 1943; to general of the Army, 21 Dec 1944; to general of the Air Force, 7 May 1949.
4	George H. Brett		7 Jan 1942; 1 May 1945	30 Apr 1945; 10 May 1946	4	Deputy Commander, American-British-Dutch-Australian Command/Commanding General, U.S. Army Forces in Australia, 1942.; Deputy Commander, American-British-Dutch-Australian Command, 1942.; Commanding General, U.S. Army Forces in Australia, 1942.; Commanding General, Allied Air Forces, South West Pacific Area, 1942.; Commanding General, Caribbean Defense Command, 1942–1943.; Commanding General, Panama Canal Department/Caribbean Defense Command, 1943–1945.; Commanding General, Panama Canal Department/Caribbean Defense Command, 1945.	(1886–1963)
5	William S. Knudsen		28 Jan 1942	1 Jun 1945	3	Director of Production, Office of the Under Secretary of War, 1942–1944.; Director, Army Air Forces Materiel and Services, 1944.; Director, Air Technical Service Command, 1944–1945.	(1879–1948) Resigned.
6	Joseph T. McNarney		15 Jun 1942	7 Mar 1945	3	Deputy Chief of Staff, U.S. Army, 1942–1944.; Deputy Supreme Allied Commander, Mediterranean/Commanding General, Mediterranean Theater of Operations, U.S. Army, 1944–1945.	(1893–1972) Promoted to general, 7 Mar 1945.
7	George C. Kenney		15 Oct 1942	9 Mar 1945	2	Commanding General, Allied Air Forces, South West Pacific Area, 1942.; Commanding General, Allied Air Forces, South West Pacific Area/Fifth Air Force, 1942–1944.; Commanding General, Far East Air Forces, 1944–1945.	(1889–1977) Promoted to general, 9 Mar 1945.
8	Millard F. Harmon		2 Feb 1943	27 Feb 1946	3	Commanding General, U.S. Army Forces in the South Pacific Area, 1942–1944.; Commanding General, U.S. Army Air Forces in the Pacific Ocean Areas/Deputy Commanding General, Twentieth Air Force, 1944–1946.	(1888–1946) Died in office.
9	Carl A. Spaatz		12 Mar 1943	11 Mar 1945	2	Commanding General, Twelfth Air Force, 1942–1943.; Commanding General, Fifteenth Air Force, 1943–1944.; Commanding General, U.S. Strategic Air Forces in Europe, 1944–1945.	(1891–1974) Promoted to general, 11 Mar 1945.
10	Barton K. Yount		13 Sep 1943	30 Jun 1946	3	Commanding General, Army Air Forces Training Command, 1943–1946.	(1884–1949)
11	Ira C. Eaker		13 Sep 1943	30 Aug 1947	4	Commanding General, Eighth Air Force, 1942–1943.; Commander in Chief, Mediterranean Allied Air Forces, 1943–1945.; Deputy Commanding General, Army Air Forces/Chief, Air Staff, 1945–1947.	(1896–1987) Promoted to general on the retired list, 26 Apr 1985.
12	James H. Doolittle		13 Mar 1944; 20 Aug 1955; 16 Apr 1956; 31 Jan 1957; 14 Apr 1957	22 Jul 1946; 3 Sep 1955; 14 Jun 1956; 14 Feb 1957; 20 Apr 1957	2	Commanding General, Eighth Air Force, 1944–1945.; Special Assistant to the Commander in Chief, Strategic Air Command, 1955.; Special Assistant to the Commander in Chief, Strategic Air Command, 1956.; Special Assistant to the Commander in Chief, Strategic Air Command, 1957.; Special Assistant to the Commander in Chief, Strategic Air Command, 1957.	(1896–1993) Promoted to general on the retired list, 4 Apr 1985.
13	Lewis H. Brereton		28 Apr 1944	1 Sep 1948	4	Commanding General, Ninth Air Force, 1943–1944.; Commanding General, First Allied Airborne Army, 1944–1945.; Commanding General, Third Air Force, 1945–1946.; Commanding General, First Air Force, 1946.; Member, Joint Chiefs of Staff Evaluation Board, Office of the Secretary of War, 1946–1947.; Chairman, Military Liaison Committee, Atomic Energy Commission, 1947–1948.; Secretary General, Air Board, 1948.	(1890–1967)
14	Barney M. Giles		28 Apr 1944	30 Jun 1946	2	Chief, Air Staff, 1943–1944.; Deputy Commanding General, Army Air Forces/Chief, Air Staff, 1944–1945.; Commanding General, U.S. Army Air Forces in the Pacific Ocean Area/Deputy Commanding General, U.S. Strategic Air Forces in the Pacific, 1945.; Commanding General, U.S. Strategic Air Forces in the Pacific, 1945–1946.	(1892–1984)
15	Harold L. George		16 Mar 1945; 1 Mar 1955	30 Dec 1946; 4 Nov 1955	2	Commanding General, Air Transport Command, 1942–1946.; Commanding General, Air Transport Command/Director of Information, Army Air Forces, 1946.; Senior Army Air Forces Representative, Military Staff Committee, United Nations/Director of Information, Army Air Forces, 1946.; Special Consultant to Chief of Staff, U.S. Air Force, 1955.	(1893–1986)
16	John K. Cannon		17 Mar 1945	29 Oct 1951	7	Commander in Chief, Mediterranean Allied Air Forces/Commanding General, Twelfth Air Force, 1945.; Commander, U.S. Strategic Air Forces in Europe, 1945.; Commanding General, U.S. Air Forces in Europe, 1945–1946.; Commanding General, Air Training Command, 1946–1948.; Commanding General, U.S. Air Forces in Europe, 1948–1950.; Commander in Chief, U.S. Air Forces in Europe, 1950–1951.	(1892–1955) Promoted to general, 29 Oct 1951.
17	Hoyt S. Vandenberg		17 Mar 1945	1 Oct 1947	3	Commanding General, Ninth Air Force, 1944–1945.; Assistant Chief of the Air Staff for Operations, 1945–1946.; Assistant Chief of Staff for Intelligence, U.S. Army, 1946.; Director, Central Intelligence Group, 1946–1947.; Deputy Commanding General, Army Air Forces/Chief, Air Staff, 1947.	(1899–1954) Promoted to general, 1 Oct 1947.
18	George E. Stratemeyer		28 May 1945	31 Jan 1952	7	Commanding General, Eastern Air Command/U.S. Army Air Forces, India-Burma Theater, 1944–1945.; Commanding General, U.S. Army Air Forces, China Theater, 1945–1946.; Chief, Selection Branch, Army Air Forces Headquarters, 1946.; Commanding General, Air Defense Command, 1946–1948.; Commanding General, Continental Air Command, 1948–1949.; Commanding General, Far East Air Forces, 1949–1951.	(1890–1969)
19	Nathan F. Twining		5 Jun 1945	10 Oct 1950	5	Commanding General, Mediterranean Allied Strategic Air Forces/Fifteenth Air Force, 1943–1945.; Commanding General, Twentieth Air Force, 1945.; Commanding General, Air Technical Service Command, 1945–1946.; Commanding General, Air Materiel Command, 1946–1947.; Commanding General, Alaskan Department, 1947.; Commander in Chief, Alaskan Command, 1947–1950.; Deputy Chief of Staff for Personnel, U.S. Air Force, 1950.	(1897–1982) Promoted to general, 10 Oct 1950.
20	Ennis C. Whitehead		5 Jun 1945	31 Jul 1951	6	Commanding General, Fifth Air Force, 1944–1945.; Commanding General, Pacific Air Command, U.S. Army, 1945–1947.; Commanding General, Far East Air Forces, 1947–1949.; Commanding General, Continental Air Command, 1949–1950.; Commanding General, Continental Air Command/Air Defense Command, 1950.; Commanding General, Air Defense Command, 1950–1951.	(1895–1964)
21	Idwal H. Edwards		1 Oct 1947	23 Feb 1953	5	Deputy Chief of Staff, Personnel and Administration, U.S. Air Force, 1947–1948.; Deputy Chief of Staff, Personnel, U.S. Air Force, 1948–1950.; Deputy Chief of Staff, Operations, U.S. Air Force, 1950–1951.; Commandant, Air University, 1951–1953.	(1895–1981)
22	Howard A. Craig		1 Oct 1947	30 Jun 1955	8	Deputy Chief of Staff, Materiel, U.S. Air Force, 1947–1949.; Inspector General, U.S. Air Force, 1949–1950.; The Inspector General, U.S. Air Force, 1950–1952.; Commandant, National War College, 1952–1953.; Commandant, National War College/Chairman, Inter-American Defense Board, 1953–1955.	(1897–1977)
23	Benjamin W. Chidlaw		1 Oct 1947	29 Oct 1951	4	Deputy Commanding General, Air Materiel Command, 1947–1949.; Commander, Air Materiel Command, 1949–1951.	(1900–1977) Promoted to general, 29 Jul 1951.
24	Lauris Norstad		1 Oct 1947	5 Jul 1952	5	Deputy Chief of Staff, Operations, U.S. Air Force, 1947–1950.; Commander in Chief, U.S. Air Forces in Europe, 1951.; Commander in Chief, U.S. Air Forces in Europe/Commanding General, Allied Air Forces Central Europe, 1951–1953.	(1907–1988) Promoted to general, 5 Jul 1952.
25	Curtis E. LeMay		1 Oct 1947	29 Oct 1951	4	Assistant Chief of Air Staff, Research and Development, U.S. Air Force, 1947.; Commanding General, U.S. Air Forces in Europe, 1947–1948.; Commanding General, Strategic Air Command, 1948–1957.	(1906–1990) Promoted to general, 29 Oct 1951.
26	Elwood R. Quesada		1 Oct 1947	31 Oct 1951	4	Commanding General, Tactical Air Command, 1946–1948.; Special Assistant for Reserve Forces, Headquarters U.S. Air Force, 1948–1949.; Head, Joint Technical Planning Committee, Joint Chiefs of Staff, 1949.; Head, Joint Technical Planning Committee, Joint Chiefs of Staff/Commander, Joint Task Force 3, 1949–1951.	(1904–1993)
27	Edwin W. Rawlings		1 Oct 1947	19 Feb 1954	6	Air Comptroller, 1947–1948.; Comptroller, U.S. Air Force, 1948–1949.; Deputy Chief of Staff, Comptroller, U.S. Air Force, 1949–1951.; Commander, Air Materiel Command, 1951–1959.	(1904–1997) Promoted to general, 19 Feb 1954.
28	Hubert R. Harmon		19 Feb 1948; 28 Feb 1953; 8 Nov 1953	27 Feb 1953; 30 Jun 1953; 31 Jul 1956	8	Senior Air Force Member, Military Staff Committee, United Nations, 1947–1948.; Senior Air Force Member, Military Staff Committee, United Nations/U.S. Delegate, Inter-American Defense Board, 1948–1949.; Senior Air Force Member, Military Staff Committee, United Nations/U.S. Delegate, Inter-American Defense Board/Special Assistant for Air Academy matters, Headquarters U.S. Air Force, 1949–1953.; Senior Air Force Member, Military Staff Committee, United Nations/U.S. Delegate, Inter-American Defense Board/Special Assistant for Air Academy matters, Headquarters U.S. Air Force, 1953.; Special Assistant to Chief of Staff, U.S. Air Force, for Air Academy matters, 1953–1954.; Superintendent, U.S. Air Force Academy, 1954–1956.	(1892–1957)
29	Kenneth B. Wolfe		16 Sep 1949	30 Jun 1951	2	Deputy Chief of Staff, Materiel, U.S. Air Force, 1949–1951.	(1896–1971)
30	William E. Kepner		14 Jun 1950	28 Feb 1953	3	Commander in Chief, Alaskan Command, 1950–1953.	(1893–1982)
31	Richard E. Nugent		11 Apr 1951	31 Aug 1951	0	Deputy Chief of Staff, Personnel, U.S. Air Force, 1950–1951.	(1902–1979)
32	Earle E. Partridge		11 Apr 1951	19 Feb 1954	3	Commanding General, Fifth Air Force, 1948–1951.; Commander, Air Research and Development Command, 1951–1953.; Deputy Chief of Staff, Operations, U.S. Air Force, 1953–1954.	(1900–1990) Promoted to general, 19 Feb 1954.
33	Robert W. Harper		11 Apr 1951	1 Jul 1954	3	Commander, Air Training Command, 1948–1954.	(1900–1982)
34	Otto P. Weyland		11 Apr 1951	5 Jul 1952	1	Deputy Commanding General, Far East Air Forces, 1951.; Commanding General, Tactical Air Command, 1951.; Commanding General, Far East Air Forces/United Nations Air Forces, 1951–1954.	(1902–1979) Promoted to general, 5 Jul 1952.
35	Laurence S. Kuter		11 Apr 1951	29 May 1955	4	Commander, Military Air Transport Service, 1948–1951.; Deputy Chief of Staff, Personnel, U.S. Air Force, 1951–1953.; Commander, Air University, 1953–1955.	(1905–1979) Promoted to general, 29 May 1955.
36	Thomas D. White		28 Jul 1951	30 Jun 1953	2	Deputy Chief of Staff, Operations, U.S. Air Force, 1951–1953.	(1901–1965) Promoted to general, 30 Jun 1953.
37	Orval R. Cook		28 Jul 1951	1 Apr 1954	3	Deputy Chief of Staff, Materiel, U.S. Air Force, 1951–1954.	(1898–1980) Promoted to general, 1 Apr 1954.
38	Charles B. Stone III		28 Jul 1951	30 Jun 1957	6	Deputy Chief of Staff, Comptroller, U.S. Air Force, 1951–1955.; Commander, Continental Air Command, 1955–1956.; Commander, Continental Air Command/Senior Air Force Member, Military Staff Committee, United Nations, 1956–1957.; Commander, Continental Air Command/Chairman, U.S. Delegation to the Military Staff Committee, United Nations/Senior Air Force Member, Military Staff Committee, United Nations, 1957.	(1904–1992)
39	Frank F. Everest		20 Dec 1951; 1 May 1953	30 May 1952; 1 Jul 1957	5	Commanding General, Fifth Air Force, 1951–1952.; Director, Joint Staff, 1953–1954.; Deputy Chief of Staff, Operations, U.S. Air Force, 1954–1957.	(1904–1983) Promoted to general, 1 Jul 1957.
40	Glenn O. Barcus		10 Jun 1952; 26 Jul 1954	31 May 1953; 1 Aug 1960	7	Commanding General, Fifth Air Force, 1952–1953.; Commander in Chief, U.S. Northeast Command/Commander, Northeast Air Command, 1954–1956.; Commander, Northeast Air Command, 1956–1957.; Chief of Staff, U.S. European Command, 1957–1960.	(1903–1990)
41	Charles T. Myers		5 Jul 1952	31 Jul 1958	6	Commander in Chief, U.S. Northeast Command/Commanding General, Northeast Air Command, 1952–1954.; Commander, Air Training Command, 1954–1958.	(1900–1976)
42	Laurence C. Craigie		5 Jul 1952	1 Jul 1955	3	Deputy Chief of Staff, Development, U.S. Air Force, 1951–1954.; Commander, Allied Air Forces Southern Europe, 1954–1955.	(1902–1994)
43	Charles P. Cabell		5 Jul 1952	11 Jul 1958	6	Director, Joint Staff, 1951–1953.; Deputy Director of Central Intelligence, 1953–1962.	(1903–1971) Promoted to general, 11 Jul 1958.
44	Leon W. Johnson		5 Jul 1952	31 Aug 1957	5	Commander, Continental Air Command, 1952–1955.; U.S. Representative, Military Representative Committee and Standing Group, North Atlantic Treaty Organization, 1956–1958.	(1904–1997) Promoted to general, 31 Aug 1957.
45	Joseph Smith		5 Jul 1952	30 Jun 1958	6	Commander, Military Air Transport Service, 1951–1958.	(1901–1993)
46	David M. Schlatter		5 Sep 1952	31 Jul 1957	5	Commander, Allied Air Forces Southern Europe, 1951–1954.; Commandant, Armed Forces Staff College, 1954–1957.	(1901–1974)
47	Bryant L. Boatner		5 Sep 1952	1 Sep 1955	3	The Inspector General, U.S. Air Force, 1952–1954.; Deputy Chief of Staff, Materiel, U.S. Air Force, 1954–1955.	(1907–1986)
48	Joseph H. Atkinson		3 Mar 1953	28 Feb 1961	8	Commander in Chief, Alaskan Command, 1953–1956.; Commander in Chief, Alaskan Command/Commander, Alaskan Air Command, 1956.; Commander, Air Defense Command, 1956–1961.	(1900–1984)
49	Samuel E. Anderson		1 May 1953	10 Mar 1959	6	Commanding General, Fifth Air Force, 1953–1954.; Director, Weapons Systems Evaluation Group, 1954–1957.; Commander, Air Research and Development Command, 1957–1959.	(1906–1982) Promoted to general, 10 Mar 1959.
50	Emmett O'Donnell Jr.		1 May 1953	31 Jul 1959	6	Deputy Chief of Staff, Personnel, U.S. Air Force, 1953–1959.	(1906–1972) Promoted to general, 31 Jul 1959.
51	William H. Tunner		22 Jul 1953	31 May 1960	7	Commander in Chief, U.S. Air Forces in Europe, 1953–1957.; Deputy Chief of Staff, Operations, U.S. Air Force, 1957–1958.; Commander, Military Air Transport Service, 1958–1960.	(1906–1983)
52	Donald L. Putt		22 Jul 1953	30 Jun 1958	5	Commander, Air Research and Development Command, 1953–1954.; Deputy Chief of Staff, Development, U.S. Air Force, 1954–1958.	(1905–1988)
53	Truman H. Landon		19 Feb 1954; 1 Jun 1959	20 Jun 1956; 28 Jun 1961	6	The Inspector General, U.S. Air Force, 1954–1956.; Deputy Chief of Staff for Personnel, 1959–1961.	(1905–1986) Promoted to general, 28 Jun 1961.
54	Thomas S. Power		6 Apr 1954	30 Jun 1957	3	Commander, Air Research and Development Command, 1954–1957.	(1905–1970) Promoted to general, 30 Jun 1957.
55	Roger M. Ramey		6 Apr 1954	31 Jan 1957	3	Commander, Fifth Air Force, 1954–1956.; Deputy Commander in Chief, Continental Air Defense Command/Vice Commander, Air Defense Command, 1956–1957.	(1903–1963)
56	Patrick W. Timberlake		10 May 1955	31 Jul 1957	2	Commander, Allied Air Forces Southern Europe, 1955–1957.	(1901–1983)
57	Clarence S. Irvine		10 May 1955	30 Apr 1959	4	Deputy Chief of Staff, Materiel, U.S. Air Force, 1955–1959.	(1898–1975)
58	Elmer J. Rogers Jr.		15 Jul 1955	31 Dec 1961	6	Chief of Staff, United Nations Command/Far East Command, 1955–1956.; The Inspector General, U.S. Air Force, 1956–1959.; U.S. Representative, Permanent Military Deputies Group, Central Treaty Organization, 1960–1961.	(1903–2002)
59	Manuel J. Asensio		15 Dec 1955	1 Feb 1960	4	Deputy Chief of Staff, Comptroller, U.S. Air Force, 1955–1957.; Comptroller, U.S. Air Force, 1957–1960.	(1906–1983)
60	Earl W. Barnes		20 Jun 1956	30 Sep 1957	1	Chief of Staff, United Nations Command/Far East Command, 1956–1957.	(1902–1979)
61	Frederic H. Smith Jr.		20 Jun 1956	1 Aug 1959	3	Commander, Fifth Air Force, 1956–1957.; Commander, U.S. Forces Japan/Fifth Air Force, 1957–1958.; Commander, Air Training Command, 1958–1959.	(1908–1980) Promoted to general, 1 Aug 1959.
62	Dean C. Strother		5 Sep 1956	30 Jun 1962	6	Commander, Air University, 1955–1958.; Deputy Chief of Staff, Operations, U.S. Air Force, 1958–1962.	(1908–2000) Promoted to general, 30 Jun 1962.
63	Frank A. Armstrong Jr.		17 Sep 1956	31 Jul 1961	5	Commander in Chief, Alaskan Command, 1956–1961.	(1902–1969)
64	John A. Samford		24 Nov 1956	23 Nov 1960	4	Director, National Security Agency, 1956–1960.	(1905–1968)
65	Walter E. Todd		28 Jun 1957	31 Jul 1961	4	Chief of Staff, United Nations Command/U.S. Forces Korea, 1957–1958.; Commander, Air University, 1958–1961.	(1906–1978)
66	Richard C. Lindsay		29 Jun 1957	30 Apr 1960	3	Commander, Allied Air Forces Southern Europe, 1957–1960.	(1905–1990)
67	John K. Gerhart		30 Jun 1957	29 Jun 1962	5	Deputy Chief of Staff, Plans and Programs, U.S. Air Force, 1957–1962.	(1907–1981) Promoted to general, 29 Jun 1962.
68	William E. Hall		1 Jul 1957	1 Oct 1961	4	Commander, Continental Air Command, 1957–1961.	(1907–1984)
69	Francis H. Griswold		29 Aug 1957	1 Aug 1964	7	Vice Commander in Chief, Strategic Air Command, 1954–1961.; Commandant, National War College, 1961–1964.	(1904–1989)
70	William F. McKee		30 Aug 1957	29 Jun 1961	4	Vice Commander, Air Materiel Command, 1953–1961.; Vice Commander, Air Force Logistics Command, 1961.	(1906–1987) Promoted to general, 29 Jun 1961.
71	William D. Eckert		31 Aug 1957	1 Apr 1961	4	Vice Commander, Tactical Air Command, 1956–1960.; Comptroller, U.S. Air Force, 1960–1961.	(1909–1971)
72	George W. Mundy		1 Nov 1957	31 Jul 1963	6	Commandant, Industrial College of the Armed Forces, 1957–1961.; Commander in Chief, Alaskan Command, 1961–1963.	(1905–2000)
73	Oliver S. Picher		1 Apr 1958	11 May 1960	2	Director, Joint Staff, 1958–1960.	(1905–1984)
74	Roy H. Lynn		2 Apr 1958	31 Aug 1959	1	Vice Commander, Air Defense Command, 1957–1959.	(1905–1992)
75	Roscoe C. Wilson		1 Jul 1958	1 Nov 1961	3	Deputy Chief of Staff, Development, U.S. Air Force, 1958–1961.; Deputy Chief of Staff, Research and Technology, U.S. Air Force, 1961.	(1905–1986)
76	Robert M. Lee		15 Jul 1958	4 Jun 1963	5	Chief of Staff, United Nations Command/U.S. Forces Korea, 1958–1959.; Vice Commander, Air Defense Command, 1959–1961.; Commander, Air Defense Command, 1961–1963.	(1909–2003) Promoted to general, 4 Jun 1963.
*	Claire L. Chennault		18 Jul 1958	(none)	0	(none)	(1890–1958)
77	Robert W. Burns		1 Aug 1958	10 Aug 1964	6	Commander, U.S. Forces Japan/Fifth Air Force, 1958–1961.; Chairman, Inter-American Defense Board, 1961–1963.; Commander, Air Training Command, 1963–1964.	(1908–1964)
78	Bernard A. Schriever		25 Apr 1959	1 Jul 1961	2	Commander, Air Research and Development Command, 1959–1961.; Commander, Air Force Systems Command, 1961–1966.	(1910–2005) Promoted to general, 1 Jul 1961.
79	Mark E. Bradley		27 Jun 1959	1 Jul 1962	3	Deputy Chief of Staff, Materiel, U.S. Air Force, 1959–1961.; Deputy Chief of Staff, Systems and Logistics, U.S. Air Force, 1961–1962.	(1907–1999) Promoted to general, 1 Jul 1962.
80	Walter C. Sweeney Jr.		28 Jun 1959	30 Jun 1961	4	Commander, Eighth Air Force, 1955–1961.	(1909–1965) Promoted to general, 30 Jun 1961.
81	Archie J. Old Jr.		29 Jun 1959	1 Sep 1965	6	Commander, Fifteenth Air Force, 1955–1965.	(1906–1984)
82	John P. McConnell		30 Jun 1959	1 Oct 1962	3	Commander, Second Air Force, 1957–1961.; Vice Commander in Chief, Strategic Air Command, 1961–1962.	(1908–1986) Promoted to general, 1 Oct 1962.
83	James E. Briggs		1 Aug 1959	1 Aug 1963	4	Commander, Air Training Command, 1959–1963.	(1906–1979)
84	Emery S. Wetzel		1 Sep 1959	31 Aug 1961	2	Chief of Staff, United Nations Command/U.S. Forces Korea, 1959–1961.	(1907–1989)

== Timeline ==
An officer held the active-duty grade of lieutenant general (Lt.gen.) in the U.S. Army (USA) or U.S. Air Force until his death, retirement, resignation, reassignment to a lesser position, or promotion to a higher grade such as general (Gen.) or general of the Army (Gen.Army).

== History ==
The United States Air Force originated as the Air Corps of the Regular Army. During World War II the Regular Army was augmented with a larger temporary force of reservists, volunteers, and conscripts to form the Army of the United States. Air personnel in the combined force belonged to the Army Air Forces. After the war, all Air Corps and Army Air Forces personnel split off from the Army to form the independent Air Force.

=== 1939–1947 (U.S. Army Air Forces) ===
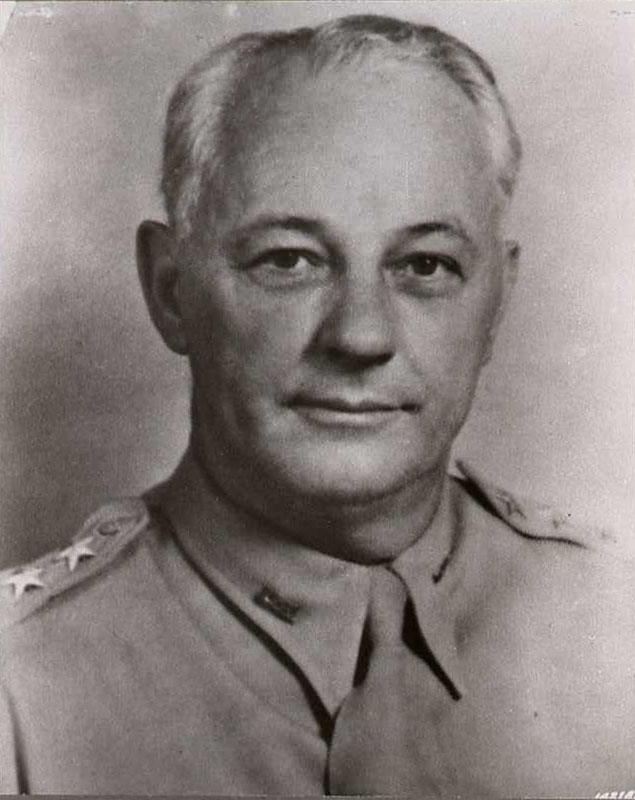
Delos C. Emmons

The first United States airman to become a lieutenant general was Delos C. Emmons, commanding general of General Headquarters Air Force, who was appointed to that grade under a 1940 law authorizing the President to appoint Regular Army officers to temporary higher grades in the Army of the United States. The first airman to become a lieutenant general in the Regular Army was Frank M. Andrews, who was automatically elevated to that grade upon assuming command of the Panama Canal Department in 1941. The Regular Army grade of lieutenant general had been abolished at the end of World War I, but was revived in 1939 when Congress authorized the officers commanding certain important Army formations to be temporarily appointed to the grade while detailed to those positions; these commands included the four field armies and the Panama Canal and Hawaiian Departments.

Numerous airmen were promoted to lieutenant general during World War II. Lieutenant generals typically commanded one of the numbered field armies or air forces; served as deputy theater commanders; or headed major headquarters staffs, administrative commands, or support organizations. Most World War II lieutenant generals were appointed to that grade in the Army of the United States, even if detailed to a position that already carried the Regular Army grade; unlike the ex officio Regular Army grade, which was lost if an officer was reassigned, the Army of the United States grade was personal to each individual, making it easier to transfer officers without inadvertently demoting them.

Although most air lieutenant generals belonged to the Regular Army Air Corps, anyone could be appointed lieutenant general in the Army of the United States, including reservists and civilians; James H. Doolittle was promoted to lieutenant general as an Air Corps Reserve officer and William S. Knudsen was commissioned lieutenant general directly from civilian life.

=== 1947–1960 (U.S. Air Force) ===
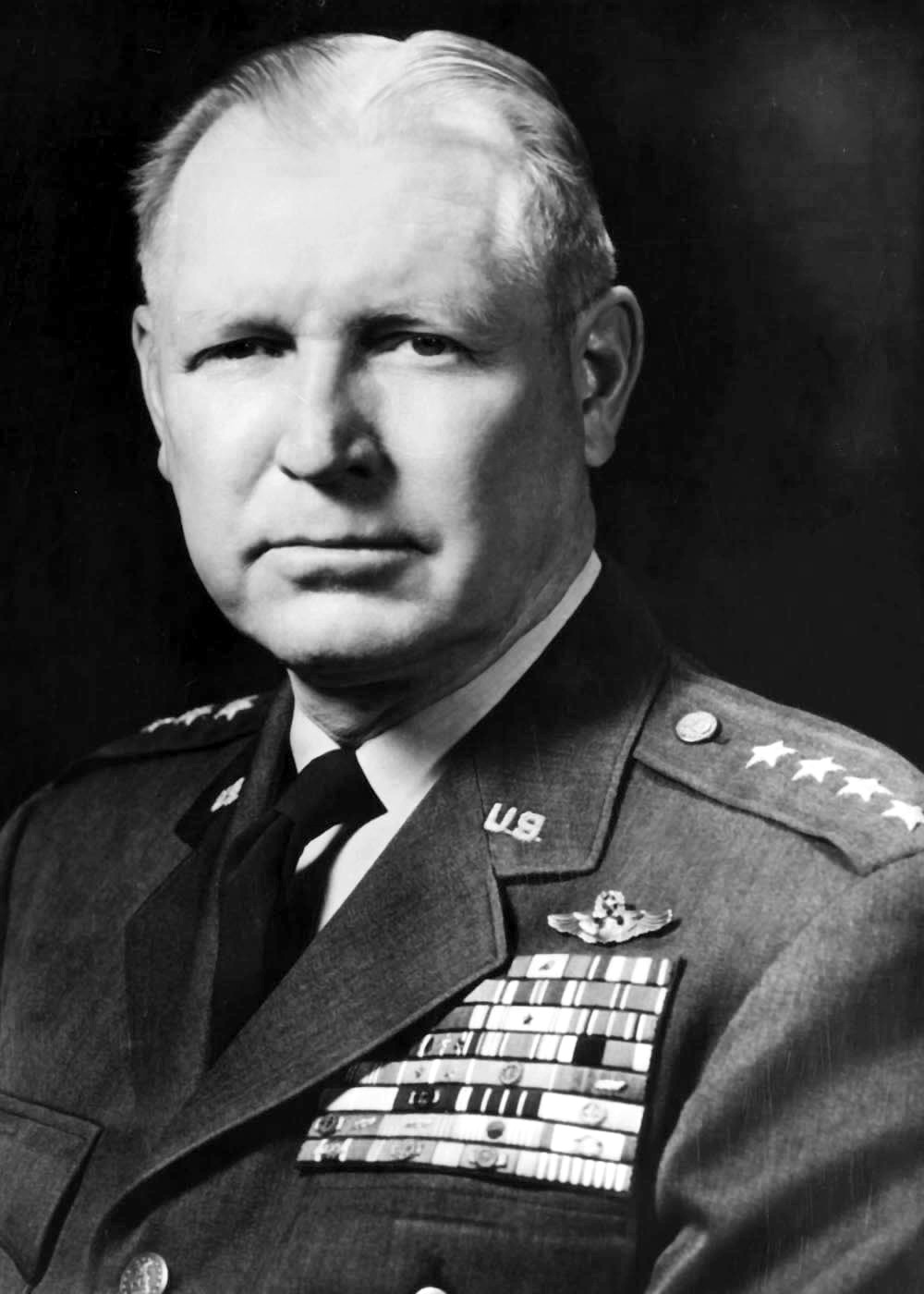
Otto P. Weyland

The National Security Act of 1947 transferred all personnel in the Army Air Forces, Air Corps, and General Headquarters Air Force to the newly created United States Air Force. Lieutenant generals in the new service typically headed divisions of the Air Staff in Washington, D.C.; the unified command in Alaska; the theater air forces in Europe or the Far East; or the Air Force's top-level strategic, tactical, air defense, materiel, or transportation commands. Many early three-star commands were subsequently upgraded to four stars, and their vice commanders were elevated to three stars along with the commanders of the larger numbered air forces.

All three- and four-star ranks were made ex officio by the Officer Personnel Act of 1947, meaning that a lieutenant general had to be reconfirmed in that grade every time he changed jobs. During the Korean War the Far East Air Forces (FEAF) vice commander for operations, Major General Otto P. Weyland, was slated for a three-star job in the United States but Air Force Chief of Staff Hoyt S. Vandenberg wanted Weyland to be promoted to lieutenant general while still in the war zone, so Vandenberg created the new three-star position of deputy commanding general of FEAF just for Weyland. Once promoted, Weyland immediately returned stateside but remained technically assigned to FEAF in order to keep his new grade while waiting for the Senate to confirm him in his permanent three-star assignment as commanding general of Tactical Air Command.

It was rare but not unheard of for a lieutenant general to be demoted by accepting a transfer to a lower ranking job. Air Force Inspector General Truman H. Landon and Fifth Air Force commanding generals Frank F. Everest and Glenn O. Barcus all reverted to major general for their next assignments but regained their third stars in subsequent postings. Conversely, Major General Muir S. Fairchild skipped three-star rank entirely when he was appointed to the four-star office of vice chief of staff of the Air Force.

== Legislative history ==
The following list of Congressional legislation includes all acts of Congress pertaining to appointments to the grade of lieutenant general in the United States Air Force or United States Army Air Forces before 1960.

Each entry lists an act of Congress, its citation in the United States Statutes at Large, and a summary of the act's relevance.

Legislation	Citation	Summary
Act of July 31, 1940	54 Stat. 781	Assigned ex officio rank of lieutenant general to major generals commanding the Panama Canal and Hawaiian Departments (Delos C. Emmons, Frank M. Andrews, George H. Brett).
Act of September 9, 1940	54 Stat. 875	Authorized appointment of Regular Army officers to temporary higher grades in the Army of the United States during a national emergency to be determined by the President.
Act of September 22, 1941	55 Stat. 728	Authorized appointment of Regular Army officers to temporary higher grades in the Army of the United States until six months after the World War II emergency.
Act of June 29, 1943	57 Stat. 149	Authorized officers retired for physical disability incurred while temporarily appointed to a higher grade to retire in that grade (Barton K. Yount, Barney M. Giles).
Act of July 26, 1947 [National Security Act of 1947]	61 Stat. 503	Established U.S. Air Force.; Transferred to U.S. Air Force all personnel in Army Air Forces, Air Corps, and General Headquarters Air Force.
Act of August 7, 1947 [Officer Personnel Act of 1947]	61 Stat. 886	Assigned ex officio rank of lieutenant general to general officers serving in positions designated by the President to carry that rank.; Assigned ex officio rank of lieutenant general to senior members of the Military and Naval Staff Committee of the United Nations.; Capped total positions with ex officio ranks above major general at 15 percent of the total number of active-duty general officers.; Capped total officers above grade of major general at 44, of whom not more than nine to be above grade of lieutenant general.; Capped total officers above grade of major general at 17 in the Air Corps and 27 not in the Air Corps.; Exempted from caps general officers serving as Chief of Staff to the President or specifically authorized by act of Congress to hold appointments to diplomatic or civil offices.; Authorized retirement in highest rank held on active duty.
Act of June 29, 1948 [Army and Air Force Vitalization and Retirement Equalization Act of 1948]	62 Stat. 1085	Authorized promotion on the retired list of Regular Army and Regular Air Force officers to the highest temporary grades in which they served satisfactorily for at least six months between September 6, 1940, and June 30, 1946 (George H. Brett, Ira C. Eaker, Harold L. George).
Act of October 12, 1949 [Career Compensation Act of 1949]	63 Stat. 806	Established pay grade O-8 for general, lieutenant general, and major general.
Act of May 5, 1954 [Officer Grade Limitation Act of 1954]	68 Stat. 65	Capped total number of general officers as a function of total commissioned officer strength.; Capped total officers above grade of brigadier general at 50 percent of all general officers.
Act of May 20, 1958	72 Stat. 124	Established pay grade O-9 for lieutenant general.
Act of July 18, 1958 [Private Law 85-493]	72 Stat. A67	Authorized promotion of Claire L. Chennault to lieutenant general on the retired list.
Act of September 16, 1959 [Private Law 86-177]	73 Stat. A77	Authorized appointment of Elwood R. Quesada to lieutenant general on the retired list the day after he ceases to be Administrator of the Federal Aviation Agency or the day before his death, whichever is earlier.

== See also ==
- Lieutenant general (United States)
- General officers in the United States
- List of United States Air Force four-star generals
- List of lieutenant generals in the United States Army before 1960
- List of United States Navy vice admirals on active duty before 1960
- List of United States Marine Corps lieutenant generals on active duty before 1960
- List of United States Air Force lieutenant generals from 2000 to 2009
- List of United States Air Force lieutenant generals from 2010 to 2019
- List of United States Air Force lieutenant generals since 2020

== Bibliography ==
=== Biographical registers ===
- War Department (1940), Official Army Register, Washington, D.C.: Government Printing Office – via archive.org
- War Department (1941), Official Army Register, Washington, D.C.: Government Printing Office – via archive.org
- War Department (1942), Official Army Register, Washington, D.C.: Government Printing Office – via archive.org
- War Department (1943), Official Army Register, Washington, D.C.: Government Printing Office – via archive.org
- War Department (1944), Official Army Register, Washington, D.C.: Government Printing Office – via archive.org
- War Department (1945), Official Army Register, Washington, D.C.: Government Printing Office – via archive.org
- War Department (1946), Official Army Register, Washington, D.C.: Government Printing Office – via archive.org
- War Department (1947), Official Army Register, Washington, D.C.: Government Printing Office – via archive.org
- Department of the Army (1948), Official Army and Air Force Register, vol. A–Q, Washington, D.C.: Government Printing Office – via archive.org
- Department of the Army (1948), Official Army and Air Force Register, vol. R–Z, Washington, D.C.: Government Printing Office – via archive.org
- Department of the Air Force (1951–1968), Air Force Register, Washington, D.C.: Government Printing Office
- DuPre, Flint O. (1965), U.S. Air Force Biographical Dictionary, New York City, New York: Franklin Watts, Inc.
- Young, Gordon R. (1959), The Army Almanac, Harrisburg, Pennsylvania: The Stackpole Company
- "USAF Almanac 2011: Leaders Through the Years" (PDF). Air & Space Forces Magazine. Vol. 94, no. 5. May 2011. Archived (PDF) from the original on 6 August 2024.

=== Other publications ===
- Cline, Ray S. (1951), Washington Command Post: The Operations Division, United States Army in World War II, Washington, D.C.: U.S. Army Center of Military History
- Hewes, James E. Jr. (1975), From Root to McNamara: Army Organization and Administration, Special Studies, Washington, D.C.: U.S. Army Center of Military History, archived from the original on December 14, 2007
- Mylander, Maureen (1974), The Generals: Making It, Military Style, New York City, New York: The Dial Press
- Neufeld, Jacob (1989), Organizational Charts Headquarters USAF 1947–Present (AFP 210-5) (PDF), Washington, D.C.: Office of Air Force History, United States Air Force
- Office of the Judge Advocate General of the Army (1940), Military Laws of the United States, 1939, Washington, D.C.: Government Printing Office
- Puryear, Edgar F. Jr. (1981), Stars in Flight: A Study in Air Force Character and Leadership, Novato, California: Presidio Press
- Y'Blood, William T. (1999), The Three Wars of Lt. Gen. George E. Stratemeyer: His Korean War Diary (PDF), Washington, D.C.: Air Force History and Museums Program, Government Printing Office, archived from the original (PDF) on 2007-09-01
