= Flight cadet =

Aircraft training position

A flight cadet or is a military or civilian occupational title that is held by someone who is in training to perform aircrew duties in an airplane. The trainee does not need to become a pilot, as flight cadets may also learn to serve as a bombardier, navigator, or flight engineer.

== Civil Air Patrol ==
In the United States, the Civil Air Patrol operates an extensive flight cadet program for youth over the age of 12, up to just before 21st birthdays. As of 30 September 2023, CAP oversaw over 29,000 cadets. One of the prime recruiting features is training on how to use a drone.

== Flying Cadet Pilot Training Program (USAAS) ==
From 1907 to 1947, the army ran this program to train pilots for the US Army Air Service (1918-1926), US Army Air Corps (1926–1941), and US Army Air Force (1941–1947). During America's involvement in World War II (1942–1945), the rank of flight cadet was changed to that of aviation cadet, often abbreviated as A/C, and the program name was changed to the "Aviation Cadet Training Program".

From 1947, this program was run by the now separate US Air Force. The pilot cadet program ended in 1961, but the navigator cadet program ended in 1965.

== Royal Air Force ==
The Royal Air Force operated a flight cadet scheme at the RAF College Cranwell until 1977.
