= Earl T. O'Loughlin =

United States Air Force general

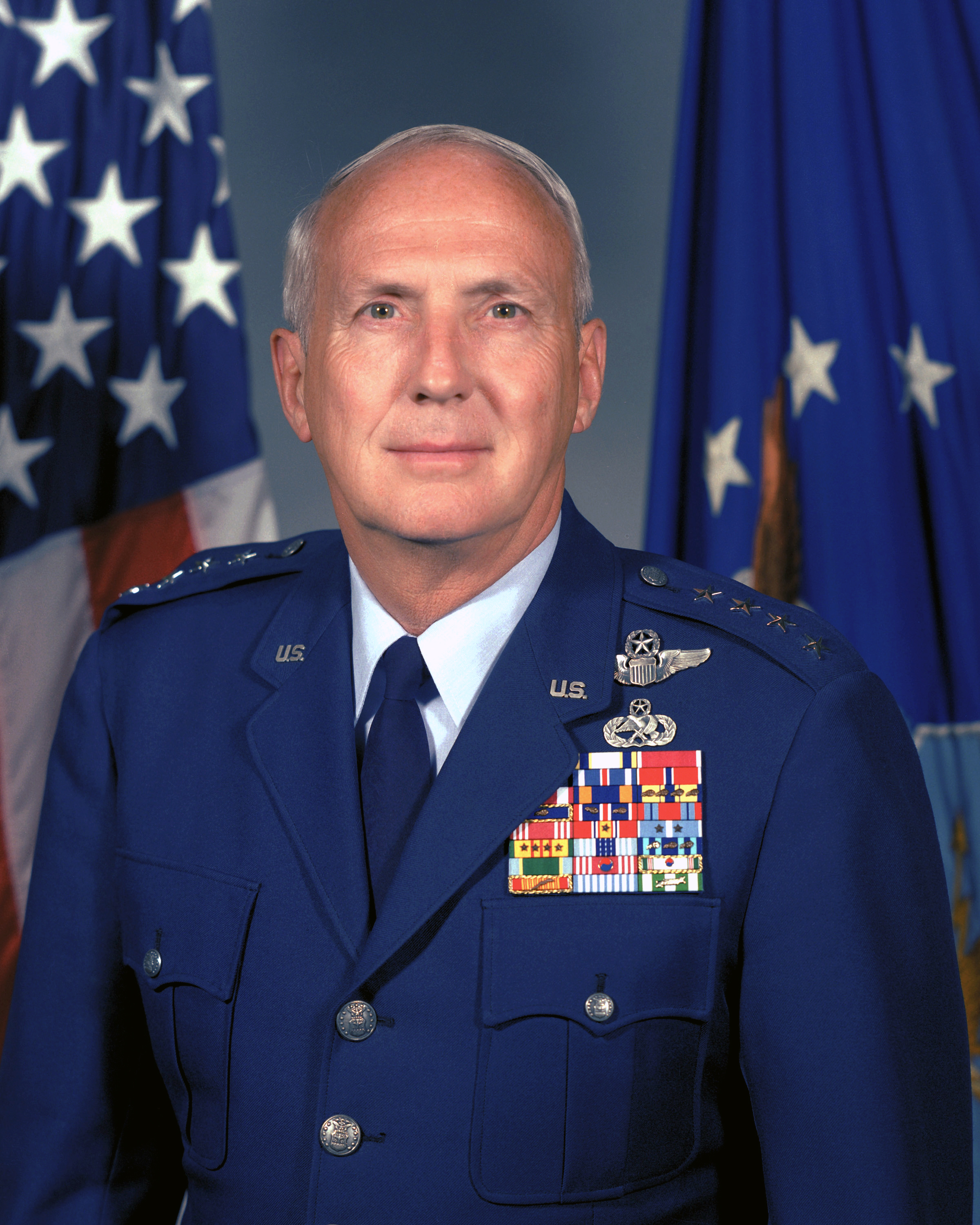
- O'Loughlin in April 1987
- Born: Earl Terrence O'Loughlin; August 2, 1930; Bay City, Michigan, U.S.
- Died: November 10, 2023 (aged 93); Michigan, U.S.
- Spouses: Shirlee O'Loughlin(m. 1952; d. 2003); Thelma O'Loughlin(m. 2004-2023)
- Military career
- Allegiance: United States
- Branch: United States Air Force
- Service years: 1954–1985
- Rank: General
- Commands: 379th Organizational Maintenance Squadron; Vice Commander 97th Bombardment Wing; 380th Bombardment Wing; Vice Commander of the Oklahoma City Air Logistics Center; San Antonio Air Logistics Center; San Antonio Air Logistics Center; Air Force Logistics Command
- Conflicts: Cold War; Korean War; Vietnam War
- Awards: Defense Distinguished Service Medal; Legion of Merit with an oak leaf cluster; Distinguished Flying Cross; Bronze Star Medal; Meritorious Service Medal; Air Medal; Air Force Commendation Medal with four oak leaf clusters

Earl Terrence O'Loughlin (August 2, 1930 – November 10, 2023) was a general and commander of the Air Force Logistics Command, with headquarters at Wright-Patterson Air Force Base, Ohio.

== Biography ==
O'Loughlin was born in 1930, in Bay City, Michigan. He graduated from high school in East Tawas, Michigan in 1948.

His military career began as an enlisted airman in February 1951 and graduated from Bay City Junior College later that year. He subsequently received his bachelor's degree from Park College in Kansas City, Missouri. He became an aviation cadet and upon graduation from pilot training in June 1952 was commissioned a second lieutenant in the United States Air Force. He completed B-29 Superfortress combat crew training at Randolph Air Force Base, Texas, and Forbes Air Force Base, Kansas in January 1953. O'Loughlin was then assigned to the 98th Bombardment Wing at Yokota Air Base, Japan. From there he flew 29 combat missions and 224 combat hours in B-29s over North Korea.

After returning to the United States in August 1953, he was assigned to the 26th Strategic Reconnaissance Wing at Lockbourne Air Force Base, Ohio, where he qualified in RB-47Es. From 1953 to 1963, he served at Lockbourne Air Force Base as an aircraft commander, instructor pilot, standardization evaluator and squadron operations officer for RB-47Es and B-47Es.

Following graduation from the Air Command and Staff College in June 1964, he served as a B-52 Stratofortress aircraft commander and instructor pilot with the 379th Bombardment Wing at Wurtsmith Air Force Base, Michigan. From 1965 to 1968, he was chief of the Programs and Scheduling Branch for the 379th. In January 1968, O'Loughlin was assigned to Operation Arc Light as an air operations officer with the United States Military Assistance Command, Saigon, J-3, Republic of Vietnam, and in January 1969 he returned to Wurtsmith as commander of the 379th Organizational Maintenance Squadron. From January 1970 to November 1971, he was assistant deputy commander for maintenance and then deputy commander for maintenance with the 379th Bombardment Wing.

From November 1971 to August 1972, O'Loughlin was assigned to Headquarters Strategic Air Command, Offutt Air Force Base, Nebraska, as chief of the Maintenance Management Division. He then entered the Army War College and after graduation in June 1973, he became vice commander of the 97th Bombardment Wing, Blytheville Air Force Base, Arkansas. Later he was commander of the KC-135-equipped 310th Provisional Wing (Young Tiger) at U-Tapao Royal Thai Naval Airfield, Thailand.

He returned to the United States in April 1974 to command the 380th Bombardment Wing at Plattsburgh Air Force Base, New York. During his assignment the FB-111 Aardvark/KC-135 Stratotanker wing received the Fairchild Trophy as the best bombardment wing in the annual bombing and navigation competition.

The general was deputy for maintenance, engineering and supply in the Office of the Deputy Chief of Staff for Systems and Logistics at Headquarters United States Air Force, Washington D.C., from July 1975 to June 1977. He then became vice commander of the Oklahoma City Air Logistics Center at Tinker Air Force Base, Oklahoma.

He was named deputy chief of staff for contracting and manufacturing at Air Force Logistics Command headquarters in December 1978 and was assigned as deputy chief of staff for maintenance there in June 1979. Transferring to Kelly Air Force Base, Texas, in March 1981, General O'Loughlin served as commander of the San Antonio Air Logistics Center. In July 1982 he was named vice commander of Air Force Logistics Command and assumed his final position as commander of the Air Force Logistics Command in September 1984. During his career there, he influenced the development of the Rockwell B-1B Lancer.

He was promoted to general on November 1, 1984, with same date of rank. O'Loughlin died on November 10, 2023, at the age of 93.

== Awards ==
Awards earned during his career:

- Air Force Distinguished Service Medal
- Legion of Merit with an oak leaf cluster
- Distinguished Flying Cross
- Bronze Star Medal
- Meritorious Service Medal
- Air Medal
- Air Force Commendation Medal with four oak leaf clusters
- Command pilot with more than 6,000 flying hours
