= Richard L. Lawson =

American general (1929–2020)

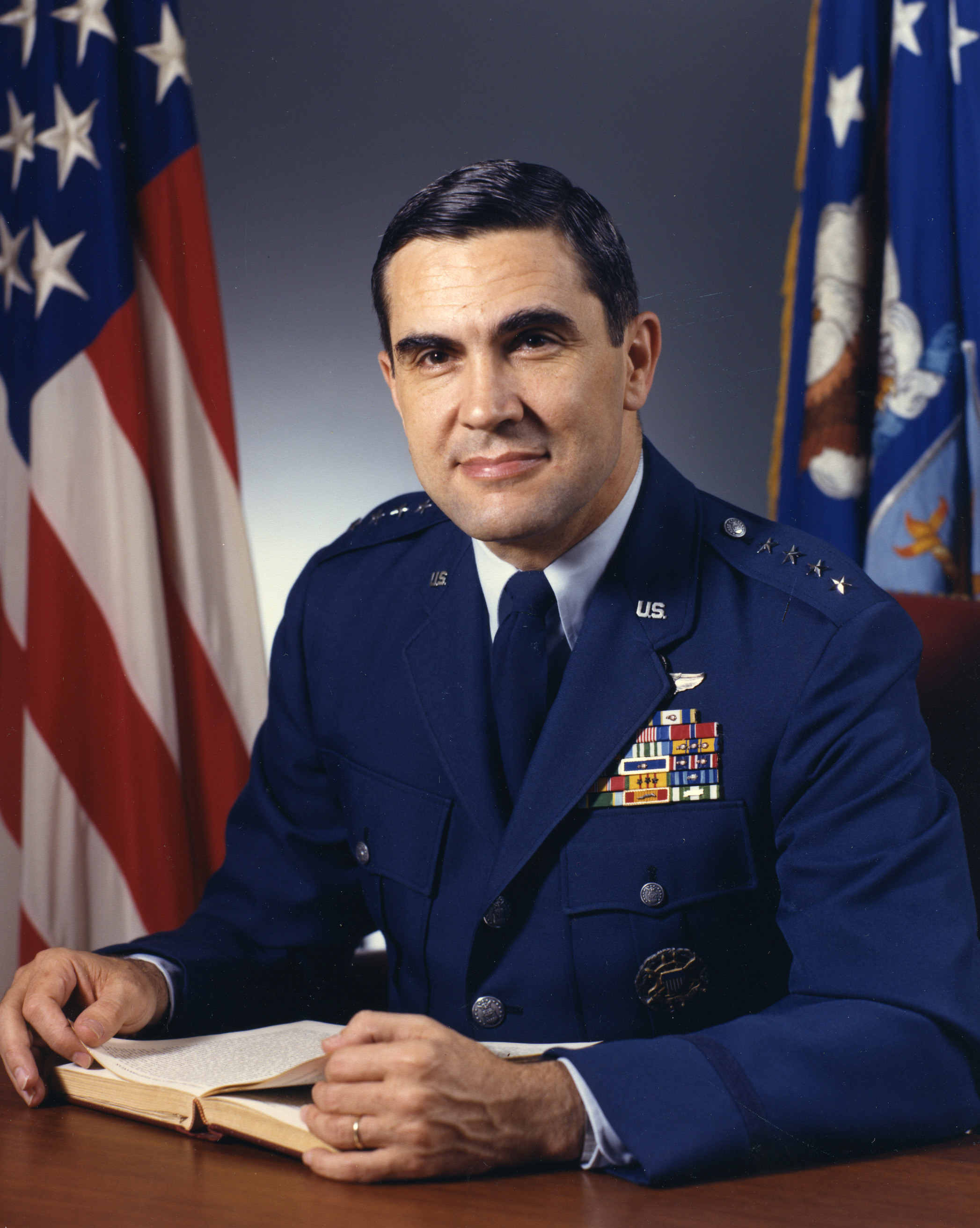
- Born: 19 December 1929; Fairfield, Iowa, U.S.
- Died: 20 January 2020 (aged 90)
- Burial place: Arlington National Cemetery
- Military career
- Allegiance: United States
- Branch: United States Air Force
- Service years: 1951–1986
- Rank: General
- Commands: Deputy Commander for Operations 306th Bombardment Wing; 28th Bombardment Wing; 8th Air Force; Chief of Staff Supreme Headquarters Allied Powers Europe; Deputy Commander in Chief United States European Command
- Conflicts: Cold War; Korean War; Vietnam War

Richard Laverne Lawson (19 December 1929 – 20 January 2020) was a general and deputy commander in chief, Headquarters United States European Command, Stuttgart-Vaihingen, Germany.

== Biography ==
=== Early life ===
Lawson was born in Fairfield, Iowa, in 1929, where he graduated from high school. He attended the University of Iowa.

While at Parsons College, Lawson enlisted in the Iowa Army National Guard and was later called to active duty as the 133rd Infantry Regiment's sergeant major at Fort Riley, Kansas. He was commissioned a second lieutenant in November 1951 and assigned as adjutant for the 133rd Aircraft Control and Warning Squadron, Alexandria, Louisiana. He graduated from Parsons in 1951 with a bachelor of science degree.

In May 1952, Lawson transferred to the regular Air Force entered pilot training at Columbus Air Force Base, Mississippi, and completed training at Reese Air Force Base, Texas in July 1953. He was then assigned to the 69th Bombardment Squadron at Loring Air Force Base, Maine, as a B-36 Peacemaker co-pilot and aide-de-camp to Brigadier General Bertram C. Harrison. He accompanied General Harrison to the 72nd Bombardment Wing, Ramey Air Force Base, Puerto Rico, in July 1955. While there, he continued to serve as aide to General Harrison and also Brigadier General H.R. Sullivan. However, his primary duty was as chief, Operations Control Division, 72nd Bombardment Wing. Lawson returned to the United States in June 1958 and was assigned to staff officer positions in the 5th Bombardment Wing, located at Travis Air Force Base, California.

The general transferred to Headquarters Strategic Air Command at Offutt Air Force Base, Nebraska, in September 1961 and served as a member of the European Force Application Team, Joint Strategic Target Planning Staff. In September 1963 he entered the Air Command and Staff College. Upon graduation Lawson returned to Strategic Air Command Headquarters and was assigned as an operations planner in the Concepts Division, Operations Plans Directorate. He graduated from the Air Command and Staff College at Maxwell Air Force Base, Alabama, in 1964 and concurrently earned a master of public administration degree from The George Washington University, Washington D.C. He became chief of the Future Concepts Branch in February 1967 and entered the National War College in July 1968. He completed the National War College at Fort Lesley J. McNair in 1969.

=== Later career ===
From June 1969 to February 1970, Lawson served at McCoy Air Force Base, Florida, as deputy commander for operations, 306th Bombardment Wing. He subsequently took command of the 28th Bombardment Wing, then deployed to the Western Pacific from Ellsworth Air Force Base, South Dakota. He returned to Ellsworth with the wing in March 1970.

Lawson was assigned in July 1971 to Headquarters United States Air Force, Washington D.C., in the Directorate of Operations, Office of the Deputy Chief of Staff, Plans and Operations, with duty as chief, Strategic Division, and, in July 1972, was named deputy director for strategic operational forces. In February 1973 he became deputy director of operations.

Appointed military assistant to the president in August 1973, Lawson served at the White House until March 1975 when he returned to Air Force headquarters as director of plans, and remained there until June 1977. He was then assigned as commander, 8th Air Force at Barksdale Air Force Base, Louisiana. In July 1978 he was named director for plans and policy, J-5, Organization of the Joint Chiefs of Staff, Washington D.C. He received an honorary doctorate of laws degree from Centenary College, Shreveport, Louisiana, in 1980.

He was assigned as the U.S. representative to the Military Committee of the North Atlantic Treaty Organization, Brussels, Belgium in July 1980 and moved to Mons, Belgium, in July 1981 as chief of staff, Supreme Headquarters Allied Powers Europe. He assumed duties as deputy commander in chief, Headquarters United States European Command, Stuttgart-Vaihingen, Germany in August 1983 and retired on 1 December 1986.

After his retirement, he began to work in the private sector, including positions as the president and CEO of the National Mining Association. He died 20 January 2020.

== Awards ==
Awards earned during his career:

US Air Force Command Pilot Badge with more than 7,000 hours, and during the Vietnam War flew 73 combat missions
Office of the Joint Chiefs of Staff Identification Badge

Defense Distinguished Service Medal
Air Force Distinguished Service Medal with bronze oak leaf cluster
Legion of Merit with bronze oak leaf cluster
Soldier's Medal
Bronze Star Medal
Air Medal with three oak leaf cluster
Joint Service Commendation Medal
Army Commendation Medal
Air Force Presidential Unit Citation with silver oak leaf cluster
Air Force Outstanding Unit Award with two bronze oak leaf clusters
National Defense Service Medal
Vietnam Service Medal with three bronze service stars
Air Force Longevity Service Award with one silver oak leaf cluster
Small Arms Expert Marksmanship Ribbon
Republic of Vietnam Gallantry Cross
Vietnam Campaign Medal

== Effective dates of promotion ==
Insignia	Rank	Date
	General	July 1, 1980
	Lieutenant general	July 1, 1977
	Major general	September 1, 1974
	Brigadier general	February 1, 1973
	Colonel	August 1, 1968
	Lieutenant colonel	September 26, 1966
	Major	July 15, 1962
	Captain	April 22, 1957
	First lieutenant	May 11, 1953
	Second lieutenant	November 1, 1951
