= John K. Gerhart =

United States Air Force general

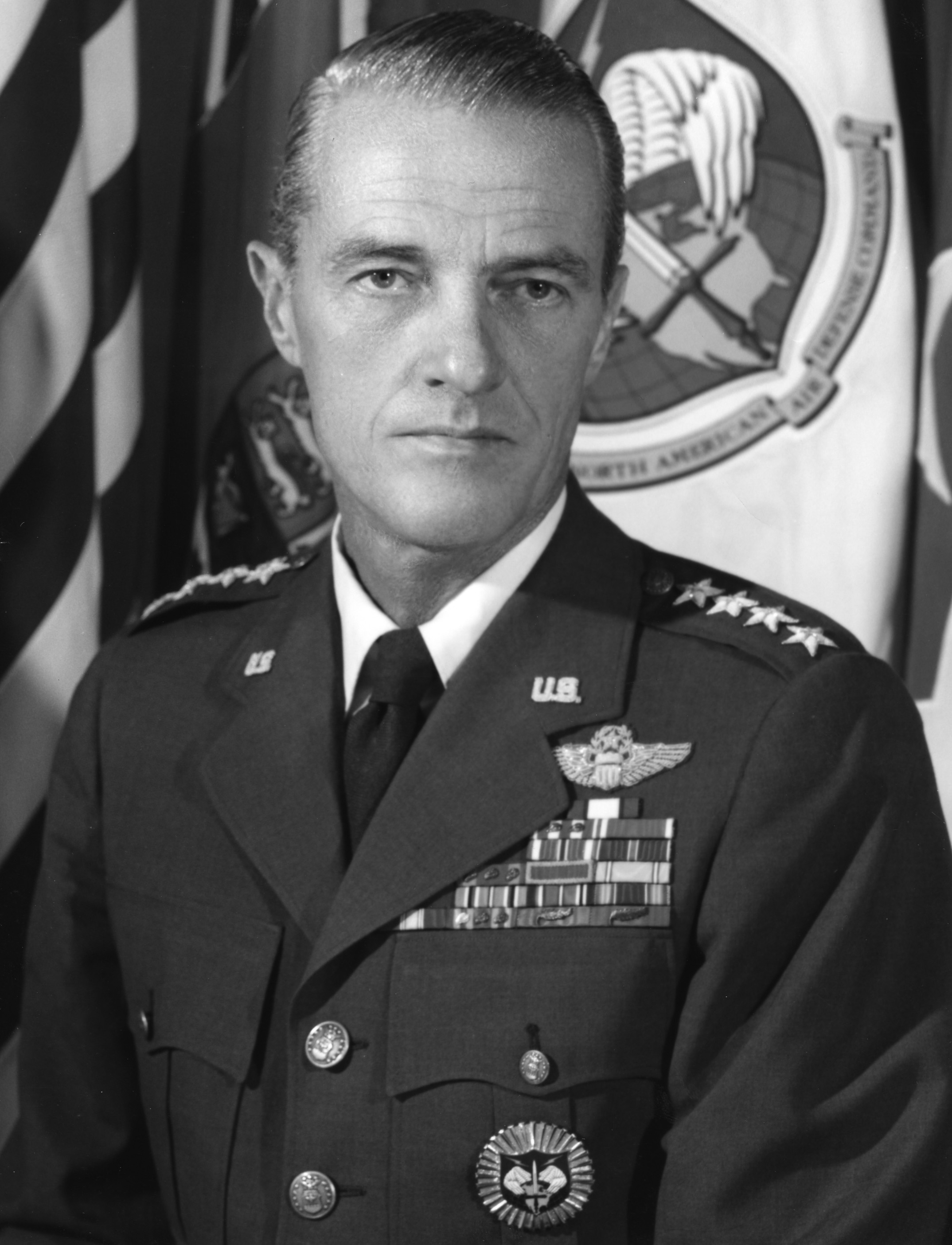
- General John K. Gerhart
- Born: November 27, 1907; Saginaw, Michigan
- Died: January 9, 1981 (aged 73); Colorado Springs, Colorado
- Military career
- Allegiance: United States
- Branch: United States Army; United States Air Force
- Service years: 1929–1947 (Army); 1947–1965 (Air Force)
- Rank: General
- Commands: North American Air Defense Command; Twelfth Air Force
- Conflicts: World War II
- Awards: Army Distinguished Service Medal; Silver Star (3); Legion of Merit; Distinguished Flying Cross; Bronze Star; Air Medal (3)

John Koehler Gerhart (November 27, 1907 – January 9, 1981) was a United States Air Force four-star general, and served as commander, North American Air Defense Command under Presidents Kennedy and Johnson.

== Biography ==
He was born in Saginaw, Michigan, in 1907, and graduated from the University of Chicago in 1928 with a bachelor's degree in philosophy. On October 12, 1929, he was commissioned a second lieutenant in the Air Corps Reserve after graduating from Advanced Flying School at Kelly Field, Texas.

Gerhart's first tour of duty was at Mitchel Field, New York. This was followed by various assignments, including several years as a flight test pilot in both powered aircraft and gliders. He graduated from the Air Corps Tactical School in April 1941.

Shortly after the attack on Pearl Harbor, General Gerhart joined the newly formed Eighth Air Force. In July 1942 he went to England with the first contingent of the Eighth Air Force. In June 1943 he assumed command of the 95th Bomb Group, Eighth Air Force, and later became commander of the 93rd Combat Bomb Wing which comprised four groups of B-17 Flying Fortresses.

In early 1946, Gerhart returned to London and Paris for a year as air adviser to the American Delegation participating along with the major allies in drafting the Balkan and Italian peace treaties.

On return to Washington in January 1947, he served successively as director of the Legislative and Liaison Division, chief of statistical services in the Office of the Comptroller, and as chief of staff of Joint Task Force Three which conducted the first thermonuclear tests at Eniwetok Atoll in the spring of 1951. During the period of his duty with the Air Force Comptroller, he also graduated from the Harvard Business School (AMP-13).

Gerhart was appointed as Joint Chiefs of Staff adviser to the Planning Board of the National Security Council in March 1953, and after two years in that capacity, was designated chief of the Military Assistance Advisory Group to the United Kingdom. One year later, Gerhart became the commander of the United States Twelfth Air Force in Germany. He returned to the United States in July 1957 to become the first deputy chief of staff, plans and programs, in Air Force Headquarters – the job he held until appointed by President John F. Kennedy to be commander-in-chief of the North American Air Defense Command, August 1, 1962. He retired from the Air Force on March 31, 1965, and died January 9, 1981.

== Awards and decorations ==
Gerhart's decorations included the Silver Star with two oak leaf clusters, Legion of Merit, Distinguished Flying Cross, Bronze Star, Air Medal with two oak leaf clusters, French Croix de Guerre with Palm, and Belgian Croix de guerre with Palm. He was rated a command pilot, combat and technical observer.

- Army Distinguished Service Medal
- Silver Star with two oak leaf clusters
- Legion of Merit
- Distinguished Flying Cross
- Bronze Star
- Air Medal with two oak leaf clusters
- French Croix de Guerre with palm
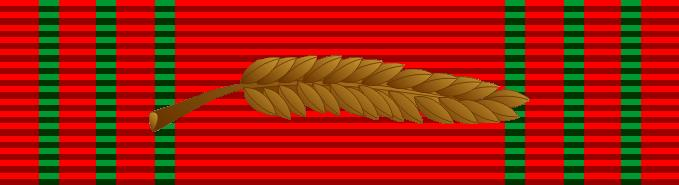
- Belgian Croix de guerre with palm

== Effective dates of promotion ==
- First Lieutenant (temporary) March 12, 1935 (permanent) August 1, 1935
- Captain (permanent) January 6, 1940
- Major (temporary) March 21, 1941 (permanent) January 6, 1947
- Lieutenant Colonel (temporary) January 5, 1942
- Colonel (temporary) September 1, 1943 (permanent) April 2, 1948
- Brigadier General (temporary) January 23, 1945 (permanent) October 9, 1951
- Major General (temporary) December 3, 1952 (permanent) April 7, 1954
- Lieutenant General (temporary) June 30, 1957
- General (temporary) August 1, 1962
