= William H. Blanchard =

United States Air Force general

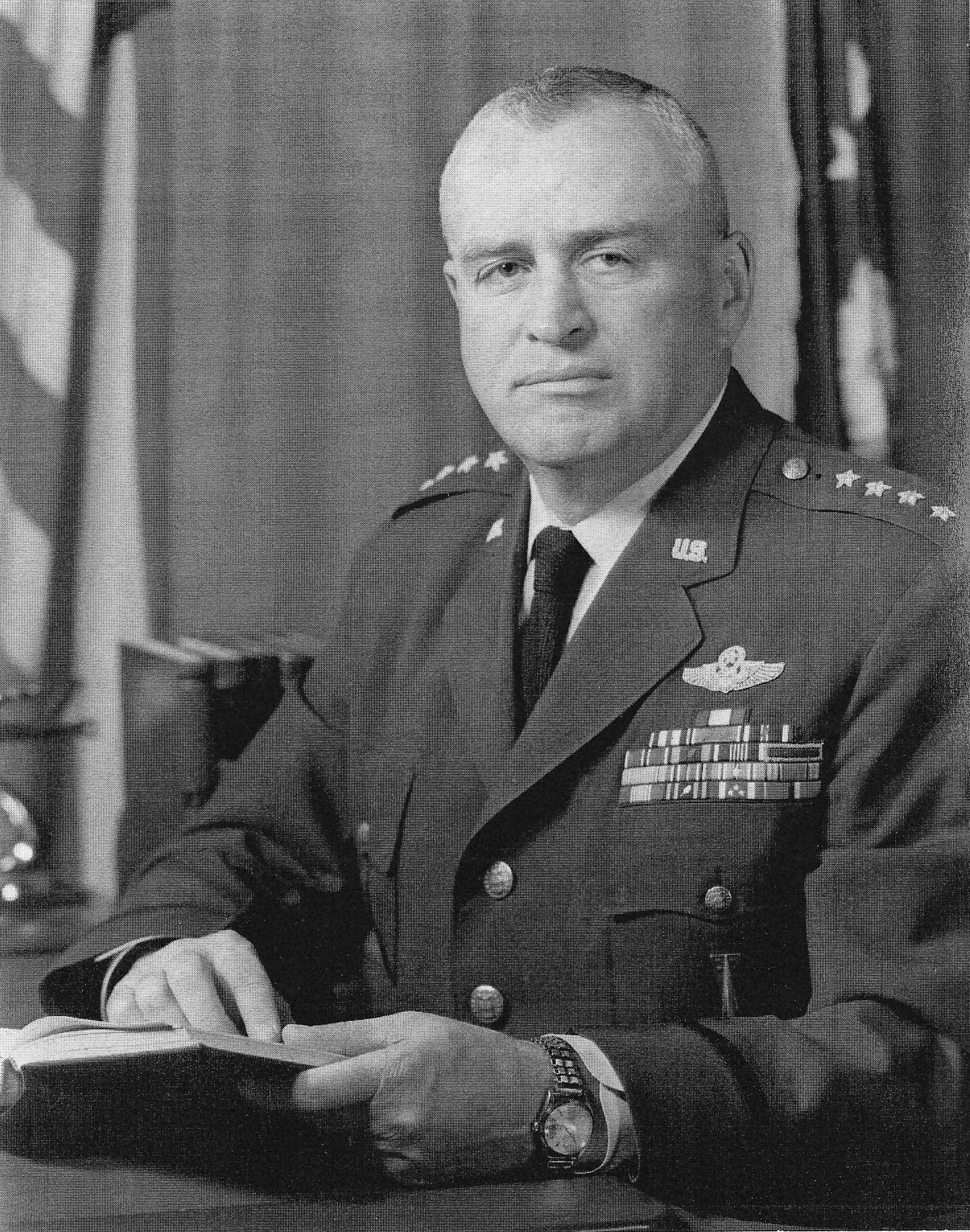
- General William H. Blanchard as Vice Chief of Staff of the United States Air Force
- Born: February 6, 1916; Boston, Massachusetts, U.S.
- Died: May 31, 1966 (aged 50); Washington D.C., U.S.
- Burial place: United States Air Force Academy Cemetery, Colorado, U.S.
- Military career
- Allegiance: United States
- Branch: United States Army Air Forces; United States Air Force
- Service years: 1938–1966
- Rank: General
- Nickname: Butch
- Commands: Seventh Air Division; 509th Bombardment Wing
- Conflicts: World War II; Second Sino-Japanese War; Mariana–Palau campaign; Japan campaign; Korean War; Vietnam War
- Awards: Distinguished Service Medal; Silver Star; Legion of Merit (3); Distinguished Flying Cross (2); Bronze Star; Air Medal (2)

William Hugh Blanchard (February 6, 1916 – May 31, 1966) was a United States Air Force officer who attained the rank of four-star general and served as Vice Chief of Staff of the United States Air Force from 1965 to 1966.

== Early life and education ==
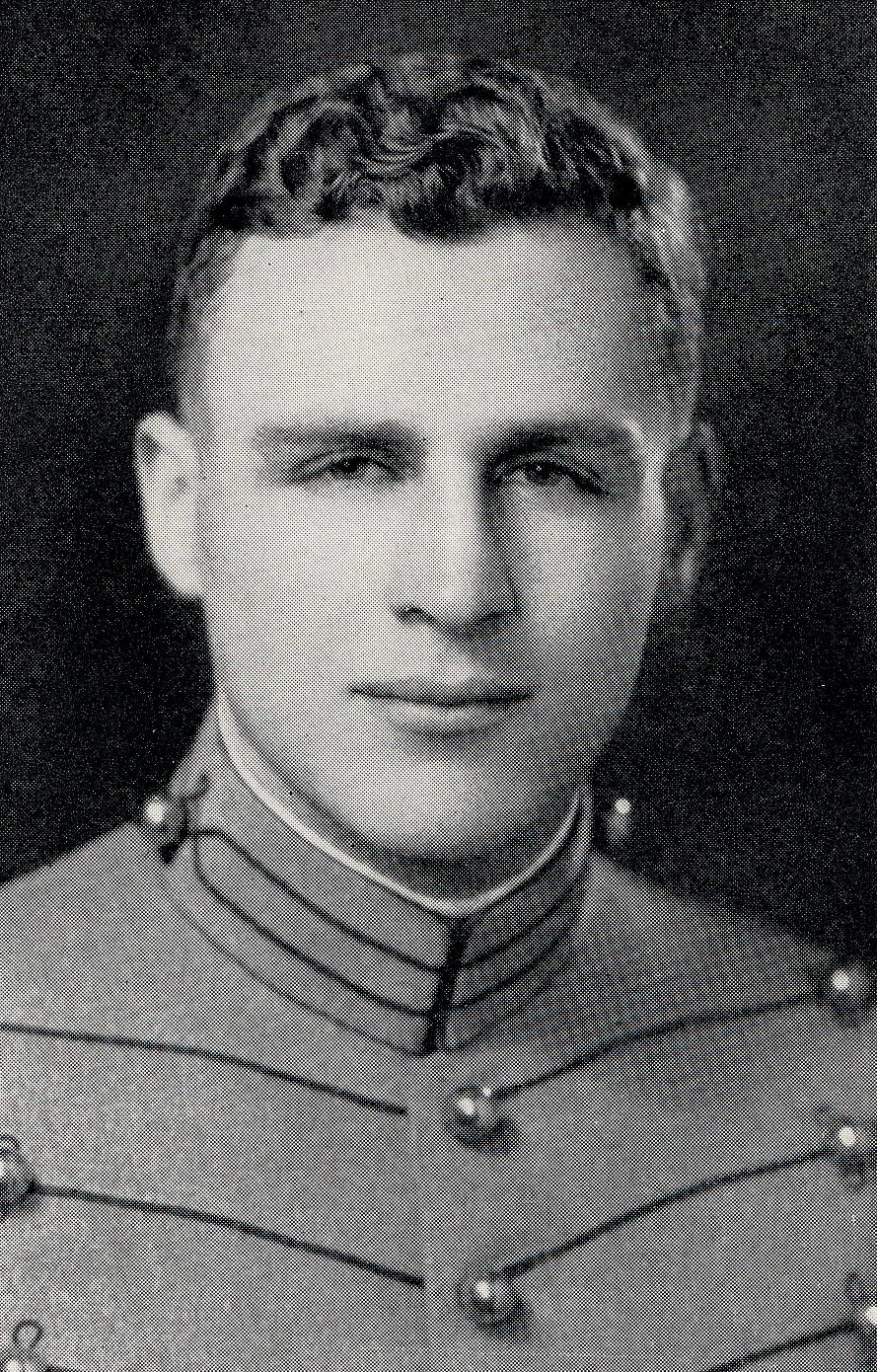
Blanchard as a United States Military Academy cadet c. 1938

A native of Boston, Massachusetts, Blanchard received his high school education in Chelsea, Massachusetts, and graduated from Phillips Exeter Academy in June 1934 before entering the United States Military Academy in July 1934. He graduated and received his commission in June 1938.

== Career ==
After completing pilot training at Randolph and Kelly Fields, Texas, in 1939, he held assignments as a flight instructor and as chief of advanced pilot training in the Flying Training Command, before his selection in 1943 for duty with the initial B-29 bomber wing then being formed in Salina, Kansas.

In 1944, Blanchard, as deputy commander of the 58th Bomb Wing, flew the first B-29 into China to begin his participation in strategic bombing operations against the Japanese mainland. Later, assigned as commander of the 40th Bomb Group (B-29) and subsequently as operations officer of the 21st Bomber Command in the Marianas, he planned and flew low-level fire raids against major Japanese targets.

In the climaxing phase of World War II, then-colonel Blanchard was directed to prepare and supervise the detailed operations order for the delivery of the first atomic bomb on Hiroshima. He was the backup pilot for the Hiroshima A-bomb drop, which was ultimately delivered by Colonel Paul W. Tibbets, Commanding Officer of the 509th Atomic Bombardment Group or Wing.

After the war, on January 20, 1946, Blanchard became Commanding Officer of the 509th, succeeding Tibbetts. By this time, post-war demobilization had reduced the 509th to a skeleton crew. But Blanchard and the 509th were immediately ordered to commence operations for the "Operation Crossroads" atomic tests at Bikini Atoll. With highest priorities, crews were assembled and in March the 509th was transferred to Kwajalein, Marshall Islands, for the Bikini atomic bomb tests, that ultimately took place that July.

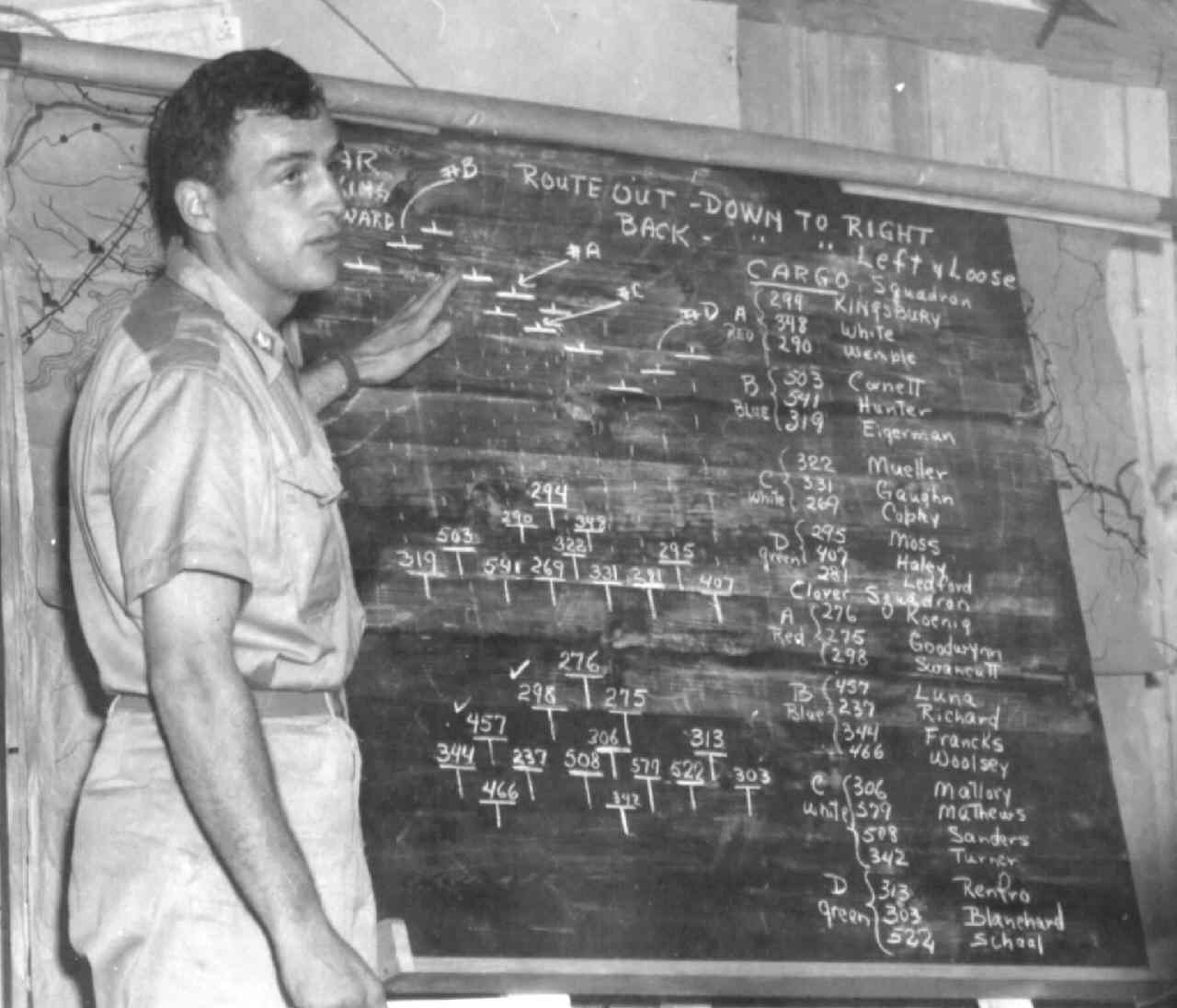
Blanchard in China describing a plan of attack. September 1944

At the conclusion of the Crossroads tests, on August 23, 1946, then-colonel Blanchard assumed the duties of commanding officer of Roswell Army Air Field, New Mexico (renamed Walker Air Force Base in 1948), which became the permanent home of the 509th, though now again reduced to skeleton operations after the Crossroad tests. However, in September 1946, they received orders to remain at Roswell and train and equip a very heavy bomber air force with nuclear strike capability, which became fully operational in February 1947.

On July 8, 1947, then-colonel Blanchard issued an official Army Air Force press release stating that the base intelligence office had recovered a so-called "flying disc" or "flying saucer" from a nearby ranch, it had been found "sometime last week," and they were flying it to "higher headquarters". The press release and the media feeding frenzy that followed it triggered the so-called Roswell UFO incident. Brigadier General Roger M. Ramey, head of the Eighth Army Air Force in Fort Worth, Texas, quickly pronounced it a misidentified weather balloon. Ironically, Blanchard's press release and the Roswell incident it triggered are perhaps what Blanchard became best known for by the public at large decades later when the event was reopened and investigated, with many books written. (see also Walter Haut, Blanchard's public information officer, who put out the press release)

A year later, in 1948, Blanchard was assigned to Strategic Air Command's Eighth Air Force Headquarters in Fort Worth as director of operations. Blanchard helped direct the atomic training of crews for B-36s, the United States' first intercontinental bombers. After commanding B-50 and B-36 bomber units of SAC, he was assigned as deputy director of operations for that command in 1953.

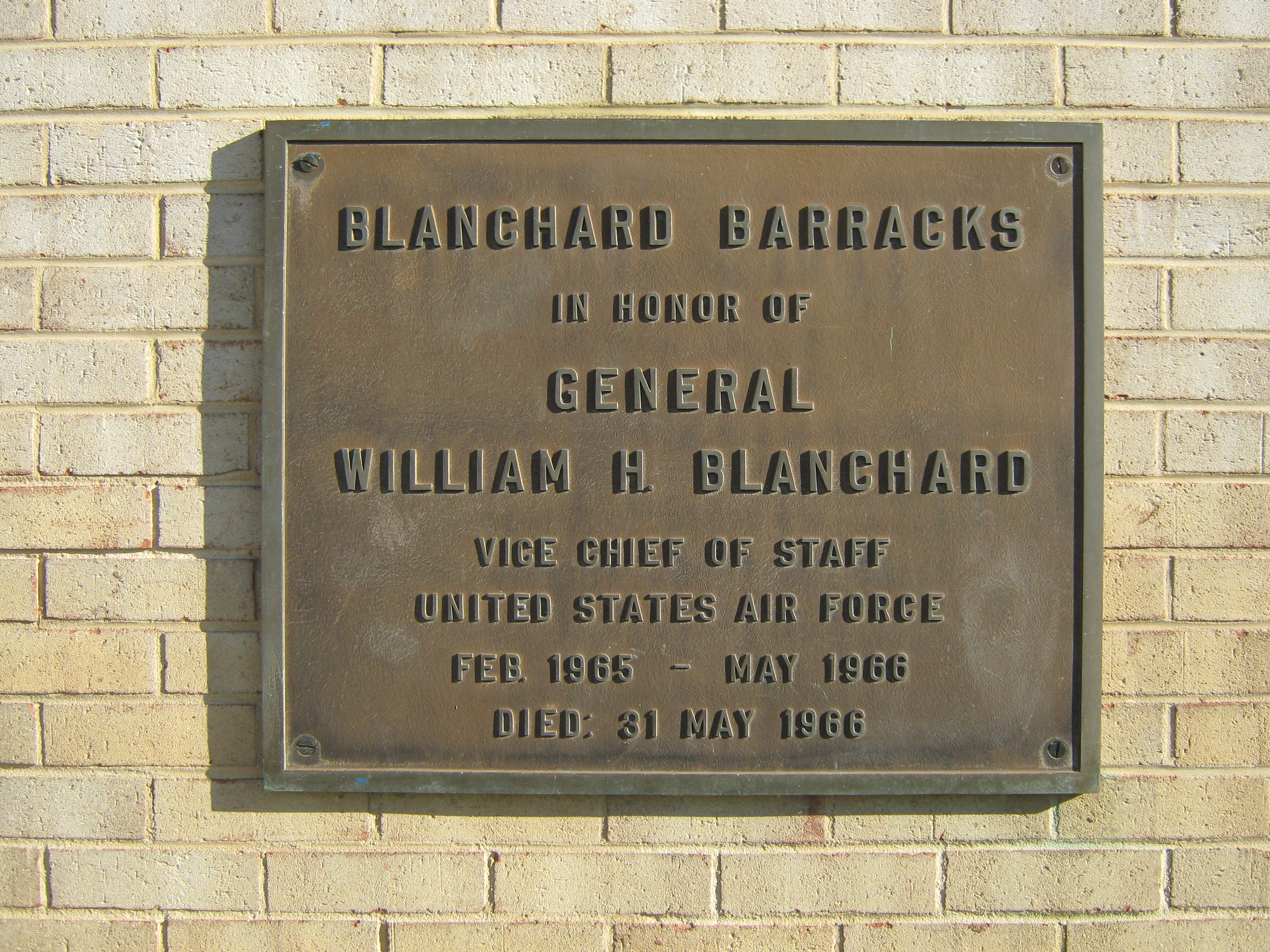
Plaque on Blanchard Barracks at Bolling Air Force Base

In June 1956, he was a member of a group of U.S. Air Force officers who accompanied General Nathan Twining, then chief of staff of the U.S. Air Force, on an official visit to the Soviet Union which included a conducted tour of points of military interest in the Moscow and Stalingrad areas.

Blanchard assumed command of SAC's 7th Air Division in England in 1957. Returning to SAC headquarters three years later, he was assigned as director of operations.

After 15 years of continuous service in SAC, he was appointed Inspector General of the U.S. Air Force and promoted to the rank of lieutenant general. In August 1963 he was named deputy chief of staff, programs and requirements in Headquarters U.S. Air Force, and assumed the duty as deputy chief of staff, plans and operations, in February 1964. He was assigned the additional duty as senior Air Force member, Military Staff Committee of the United Nations, later that year.

On February 19, 1965, Blanchard became Vice Chief of Staff of the U.S. Air Force, with promotion to four-star rank.

== Death ==
Blanchard died at the Pentagon on May 31, 1966, of a massive heart attack while still on active duty. He was buried on June 3, 1966 at the United States Air Force Academy Cemetery. His wife, Anne (Hutt) Blanchard, his daughter, Mrs. Dale Brown, and sons William Hugh Blanchard II & Donald H. Blanchard attended the interment ceremony. There is a building at Bolling Air Force Base named in his honor, as well as the golf course on Davis Monthan Air Force Base in Tucson, Arizona.

== Awards and decorations ==
His decorations included the Air Force Distinguished Service Medal, the Silver Star, Legion of Merit with two oak leaf clusters, the Distinguished Flying Cross with oak leaf cluster, the Bronze Star, the Air Medal with oak leaf cluster, the Presidential Unit Citation, the Asiatic-Pacific Campaign Medal with six bronze stars, the Missile Badge and command pilot wings.

USAF Command Pilot Badge
Air Force Distinguished Service Medal		Silver Star
Legion of Merit with two bronze oak leaf clusters	Distinguished Flying Cross with bronze oak leaf cluster	Bronze Star Medal
Air Medal with bronze oak leaf cluster	Army Commendation Medal	Air Force Presidential Unit Citation
American Defense Service Medal	American Campaign Medal	Asiatic–Pacific Campaign Medal with silver campaign star
World War II Victory Medal	National Defense Service Medal with service star	Air Force Longevity Service Award with silver oak leaf cluster
Philippine Defense Medal	Philippine Liberation Medal	China War Memorial Medal

== Effective dates of promotion ==
Insignia	Rank	Date
	General	February 19, 1965
	Lieutenant general	October 1, 1961
	Major general	October 24, 1956
	Brigadier general	September 24, 1952
	Colonel	June 24, 1944
	Lieutenant colonel	December 21, 1942
	Major	May 28, 1942
	Captain	October 10, 1941
	First lieutenant	June 14, 1941
	Second lieutenant	June 14, 1938

Military offices
Preceded by John P. McConnell	Vice Chief of Staff of the United States Air Force; 19 February 1965 – 31 May 1966	Succeeded by Bruce K. Holloway
Preceded by Joseph F. Carroll	Inspector General of the Air Force; 1961 – 1963	Succeeded by John D. Ryan
