= Raymond J. Reeves =

United States Air Force general

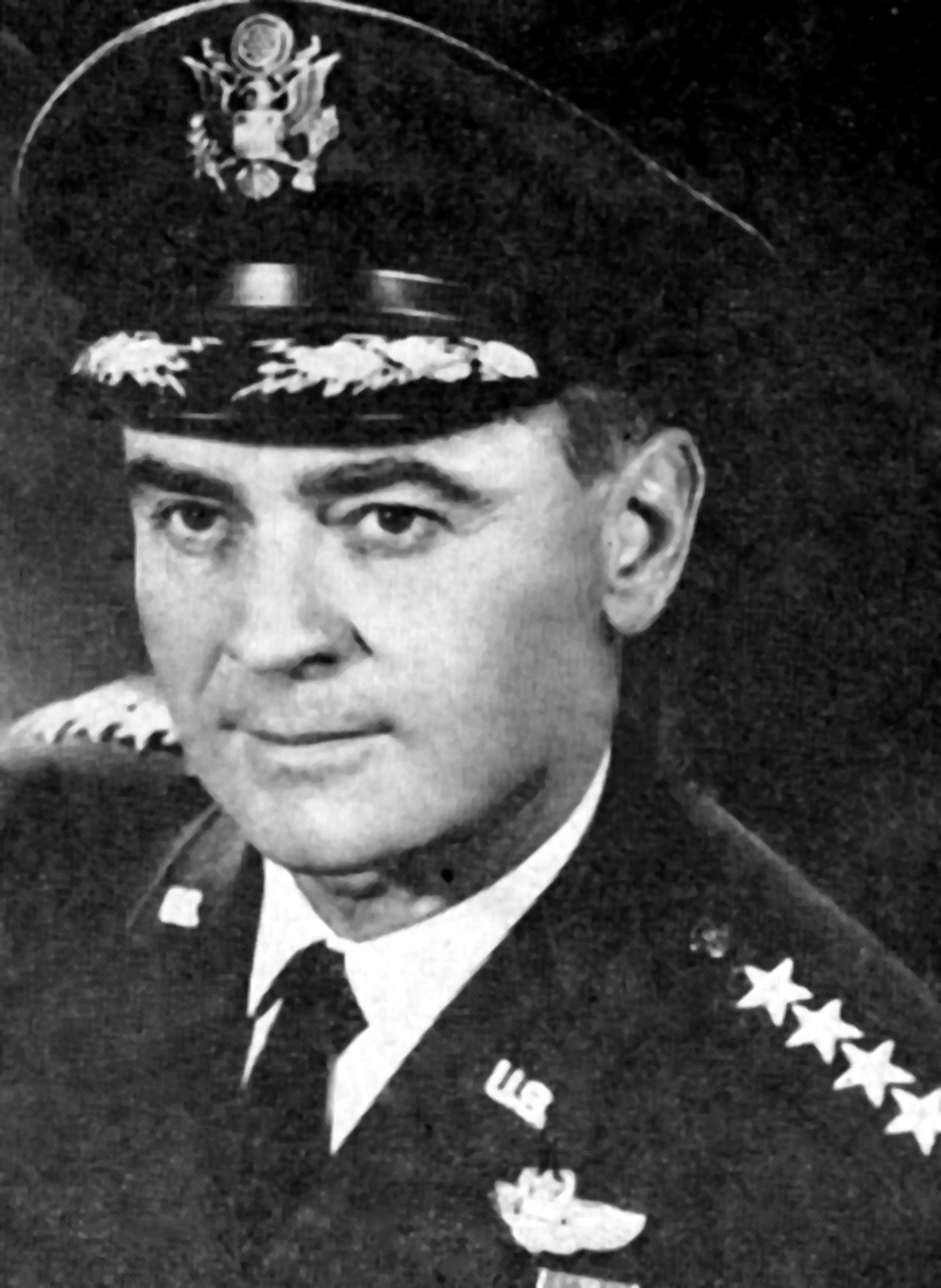
- General Raymond J. Reeves
- Born: February 5, 1909; Chattanooga, Tennessee
- Died: November 16, 1998 (aged 89); Las Vegas, Nevada
- Military career
- Allegiance: United States of America
- Branch: United States Army; United States Air Force
- Service years: 1934–1947 (Army); 1947-1969 (Air Force)
- Rank: General

General Raymond Judson Reeves (February 5, 1909 – November 16, 1998) was a United States Air Force four-star general who served as the Commander in Chief, North American Air Defense Command/Commander in Chief, Continental Air Defense Command (CINCNORAD/CINCONAD) from 1966 to 1969.

Reeves was born in Chattanooga, Tennessee, in 1909. He moved to Washington, D.C., at an early age where he attended grammar and high school. After two years at the University of Maryland he entered the United States Military Academy at West Point, New York. He graduated and was commissioned a second lieutenant in June 1934.

He entered flying training the same year and received his pilot wings in October 1935 at Kelly Field, Texas. In February 1936 he was assigned to the 3rd Pursuit Squadron at Clark Field, Philippine Islands. Two and a half years later he returned to the United States and was assigned to the Air Corps Technical School at Lowry Field, Colorado.

At the beginning of World War II, he was assigned as director of training, Army Air Forces Technical School, Gulfport Field, Mississippi. Later Reeves served as director of training, then commanding officer of the Army Air Forces Technical School at Yale University. Under his command, the school graduated more than 14,000 officers specifically trained in aircraft maintenance, engineering, air and ground communications, aircraft armament and aerial intelligence photography.

In 1945 he was assigned to the Far East Command as chief of the Redeployment Section, later becoming assistant chief of Air Staff for Supply. During his Far East Air Forces tour of duty he also served as deputy commanding officer, 13th Fighter Command; chief of staff, 85th Fighter Wing; and as commander, Fort William McKinley.

Following duty assignments at U.S. Air Force Headquarters in Washington, D.C., Reeves was assigned to Headquarters U.S. Air Forces in Europe, Wiesbaden, Germany, as assistant chief of staff for personnel. During this time USAFE was helping to reinforce the North Atlantic Treaty Organization through a buildup of U.S. Air Force units in Europe. He was responsible for manning combat and support units, as well as for personnel policies for a command of more than 100,000 people in more than 15 countries of Europe, North Africa and the Middle East.

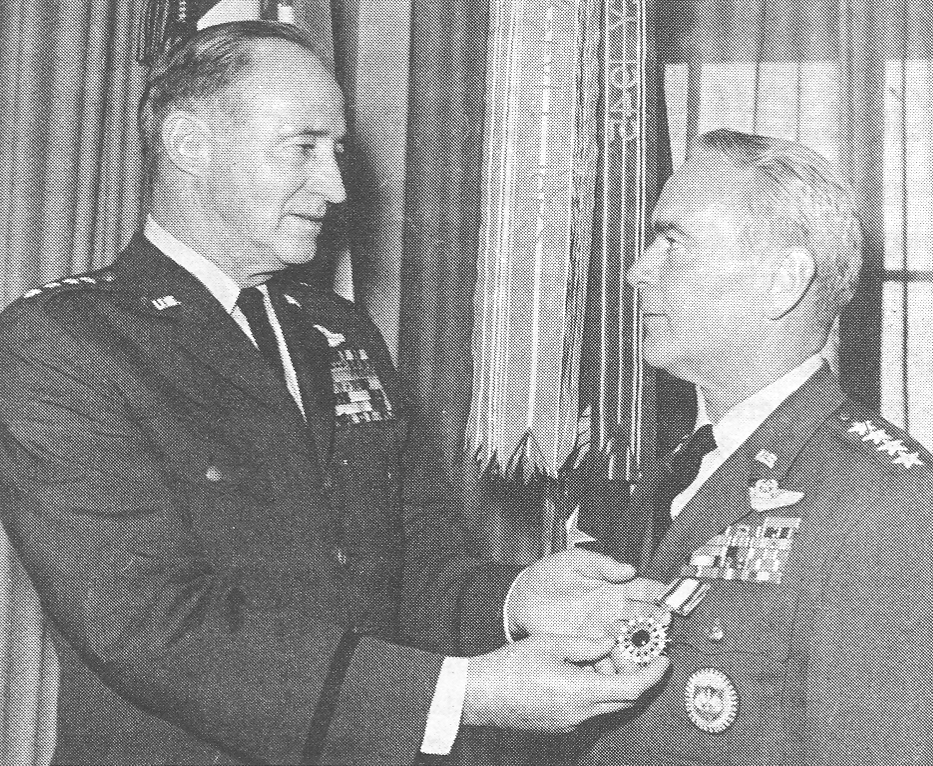
Receiving the Distinguished Service Medal from Air Force Chief of Staff John P. McConnell (left), for services while Commander in Chief, Alaskan Air Command.

Returning to U.S. Air Force headquarters in 1954, he was assigned as director of military personnel under the deputy chief of staff, personnel. In July 1959 he became vice commander of the Military Air Transport Service with headquarters at Scott Air Force Base, Illinois, and in August 1963 he became commander in chief, Alaskan Command with additional duty as commander, Alaskan NORAD Region.

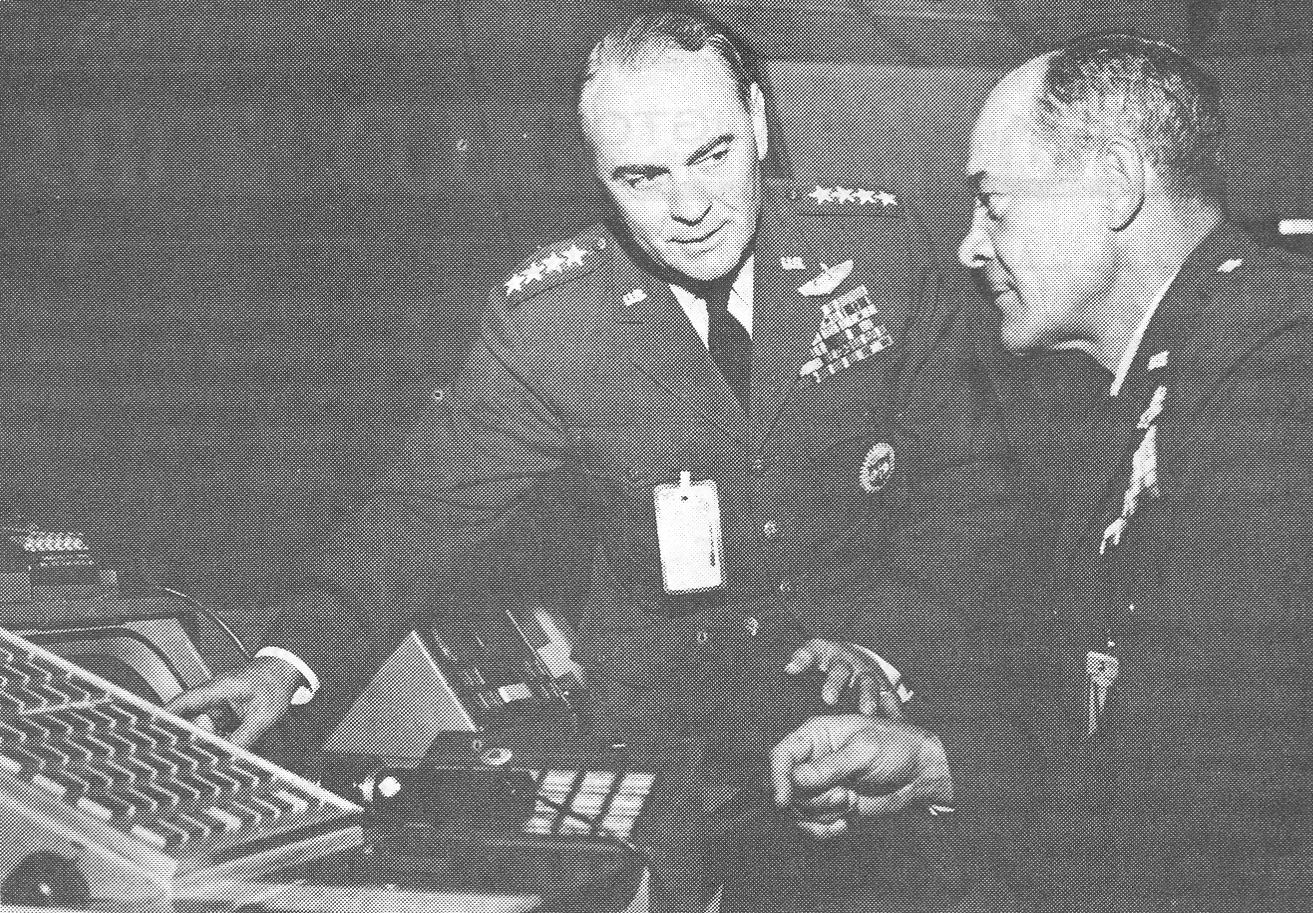
As Commander in Chief, North American Air Defense Command (left), explaining his command post to Gen. Joseph J. Nazzaro, Commander in Chief, Strategic Air Command, 1967.

In August 1966 Reeves was appointed commander in chief of NORAD/CONAD, with headquarters at Ent Air Force Base, Colorado.

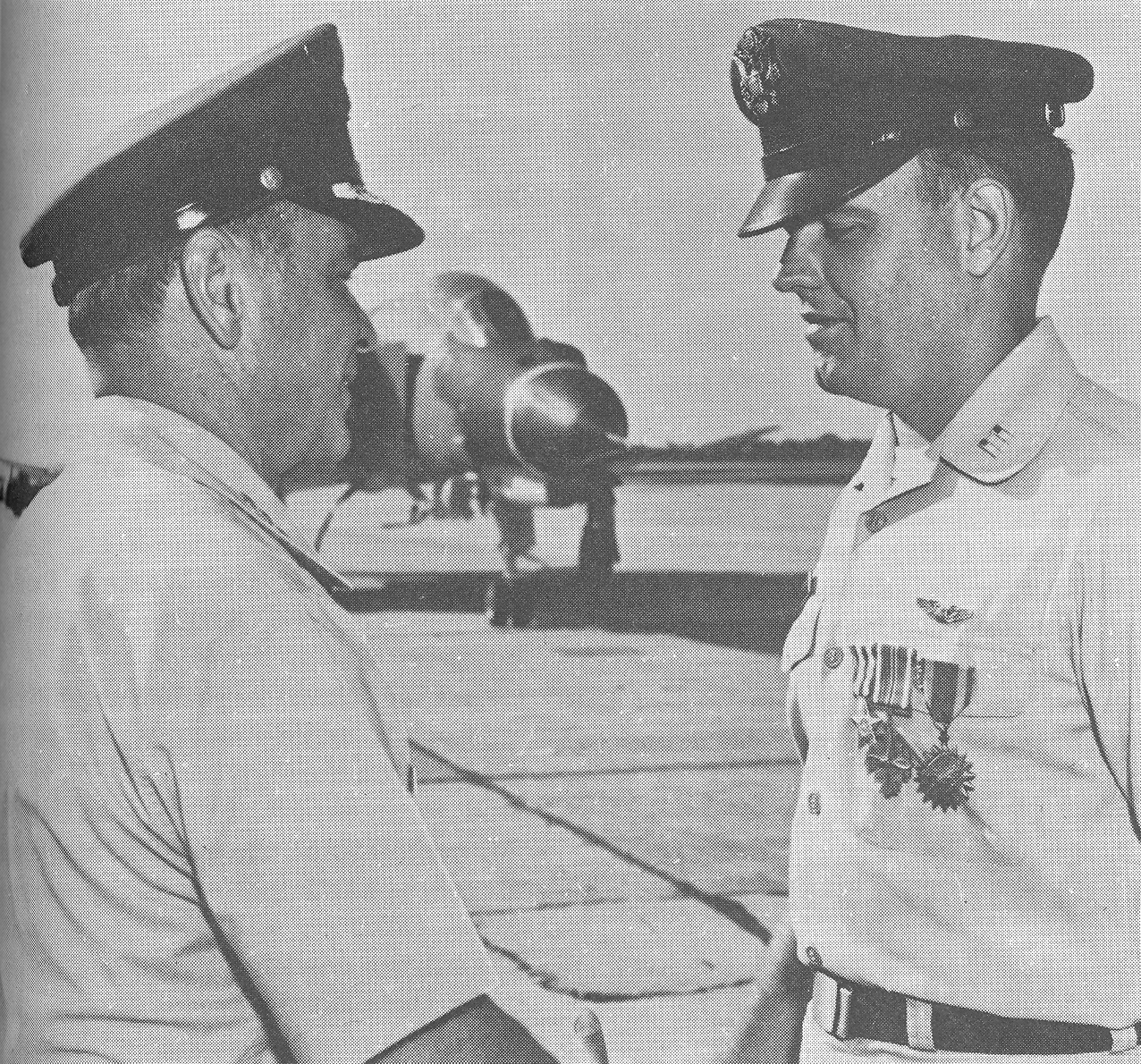
Presenting the Silver Star, Distinguished Flying Cross, and Air Medal to his son, Air Force Capt. Raymond J. Reeves (right).

His military decorations include the Distinguished Service Medal, Legion of Merit, Army Commendation Medal with oak leaf cluster and Air Force Outstanding Unit Award Ribbon with oak leaf cluster.

He retired from the Air Force on July 31, 1969, and died November 16, 1998.
