= Joseph J. Nazzaro =

United States Air Force general

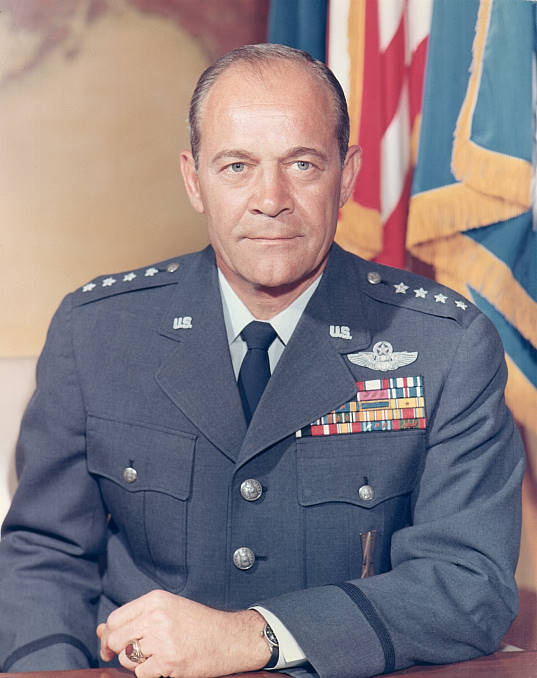
- General Joseph J. Nazzaro
- Born: March 21, 1913; New York City, US
- Died: February 5, 1990 (aged 76); Tucson, Arizona, US
- Burial place: United States Air Force Academy Cemetery
- Military career
- Allegiance: United States
- Branch: United States Air Force
- Service years: 1936–1971
- Rank: General
- Commands: Pacific Air Forces; Strategic Air Command
- Conflicts: World War II; Cold War
- Awards: Air Force Distinguished Service Medal (2); Army Distinguished Service Medal; Silver Star; Legion of Merit (4); Distinguished Flying Cross; Air Medal (2)

Joseph James Nazzaro (March 21, 1913 – February 5, 1990) was commander in chief of Pacific Air Forces with headquarters at Hickam Air Force Base, Hawaii and commander in chief of Strategic Air Command with headquarters at Offutt Air Force Base, Nebraska.

== Early life and military career ==
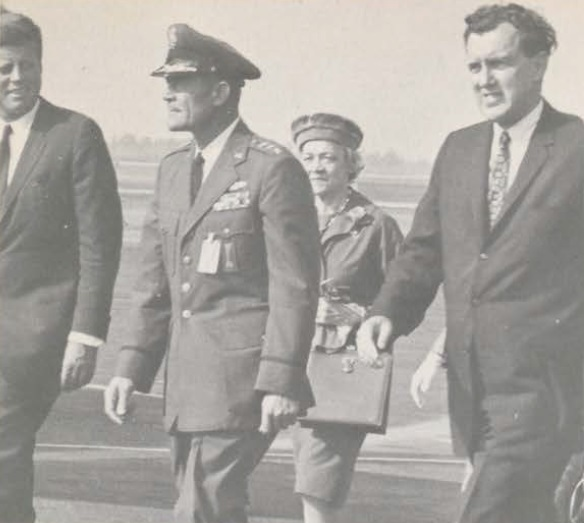
Lieutenant General Joseph J. Nazzaro with President John F. Kennedy at Dow Air Force Base in 1962.

Nazzaro, son of Italian immigrants, was born in New York, New York in 1913. He grew up in Queens with brother John (Marine Colonel) and sisters Mary, Francis, and Rose. He attended high school in New York, Millard Preparatory School in Washington, D.C., and graduated from the United States Military Academy in 1936 with a commission as second lieutenant in the Infantry. After graduation from advanced flying school at Kelly Field, Texas in October 1937, he was transferred to the U.S. Army Air Corps.

He then served in the Philippine Islands and from 1940 to 1942, Nazzaro held assignments with the 7th Bombardment Group, Salt Lake City, Utah; 39th Bombardment Group, Geiger Field, Washington, and commanded the 302nd Bombardment Group, Tucson, Arizona.

Early in 1943, Nazzaro was named commander of the 381st Bombardment Group, Pyote, Texas, and led the unit to England in May where it joined the Eighth Air Force. In January 1944, he became deputy director of operations, U.S. Strategic Air Forces in Europe. In August 1944, Nazzaro returned to the United States and was assigned as deputy commander, 316th Bombardment Wing, Colorado Springs, Colorado. The wing was moved to Okinawa in December 1945, at which time he assumed command.

In May 1946, he became chief of the Operations Division, Headquarters Strategic Air Command, Bolling Field, Washington, D.C. Following graduation from the Air Command and Staff School at Maxwell Field, Alabama, Nazzaro became an instructor at the school, a position he held until December 1948. He then returned to Washington, D.C., for duty in the War Plans Division, Directorate of Plans, Headquarters U.S. Air Force.

In August 1952, Nazzaro moved to Lake Charles Air Force Base, Louisiana to take command of the 68th Bombardment Wing. A year later he was named commander of the 38th Air Division, Hunter Air Force Base, Georgia.

In June 1955, Nazzaro was appointed commander of Strategic Air Command's 15th Air Division in Morocco. He returned to the United States in July 1957 and was assigned to U.S. Air Force Headquarters as director of personnel planning.

In July 1959, Nazzaro was named deputy commander, Fifteenth Air Force, March Air Force Base, California, and in October 1962, he became commander of the Eighth Air Force, Westover Air Force Base, Massachusetts.

== Strategic Air Command and Pacific Air Forces ==
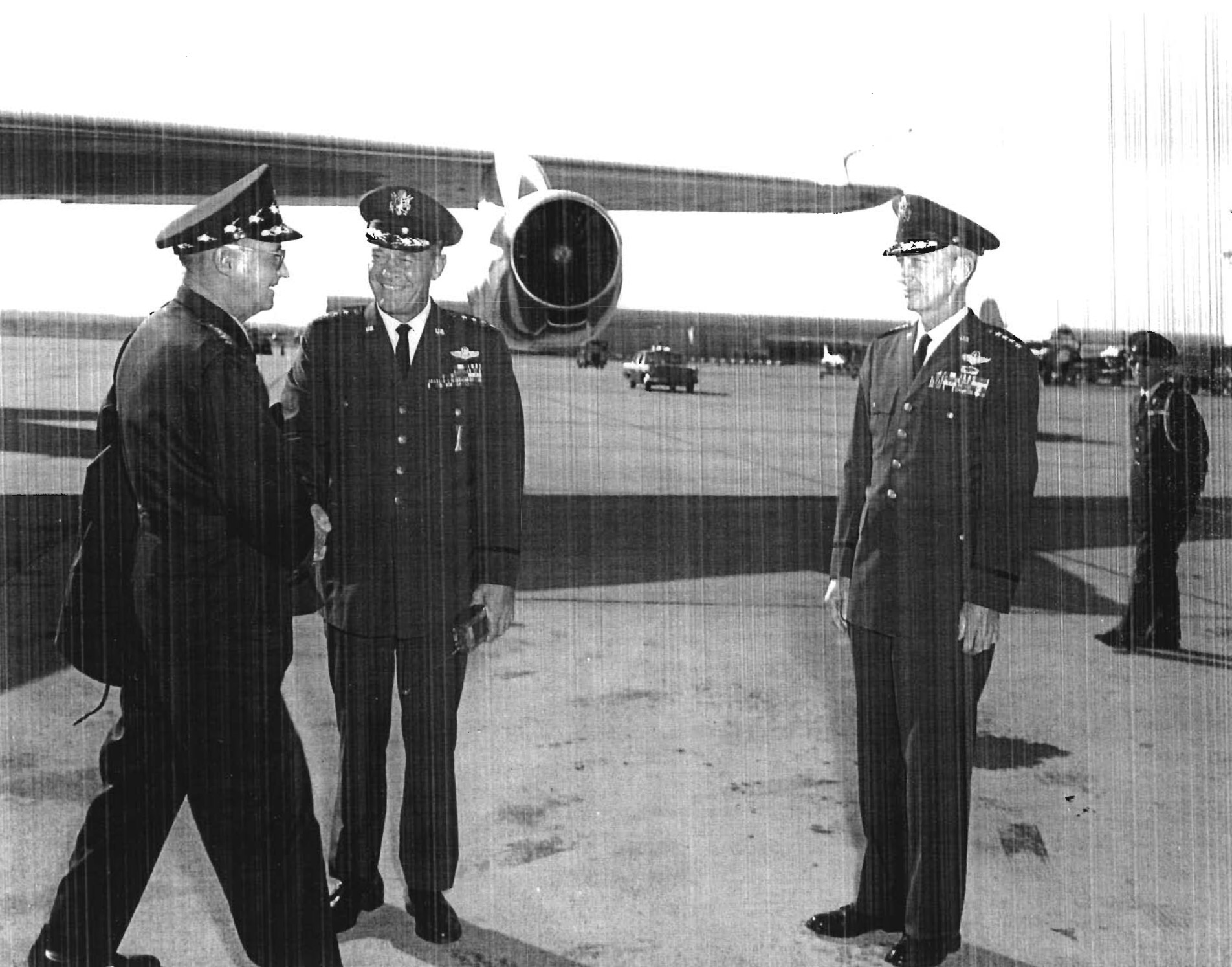
General Joseph J. Nazzaro during his tenure as Commanders-in-Chief of The Strategic Air Command greeted United States Air Force Chief of Staff General John P. McConnell accompanied by United States Air Force Vice Chief of Staff General Bruce K. Holloway at Strategic Air Command's Headquarters in Offutt Air Force Base, Omaha, Nebraska, August 1, 1968.

In December 1964, Nazzaro became vice commander in chief of Strategic Air Command, and in February 1967 following the appointment of General John D. Ryan to be the next commander of Pacific Air Force, Nazzaro was appointed Commanders-in-Chief of The Strategic Air Command (CINCSAC) and was elevated into the rank of Four-Star General. He assumed his duties as commander in chief of Strategic Air Command with headquarters at Offutt Air Force Base, Nebraska, on February 1, 1967. In this capacity, General Nazzaro oversaw the United States primary Nuclear Deterrence and its Nuclear Triads, including Strategic Air Command's fleet of Strategic Bombers Aircraft and the Intercontinental-Ballistic Missiles (ICBM). During his tenured as Commander of The Strategic Air Command General Nazzaro also introduce The Missile Combat Competition which purpose was to train the Intercontinental-Ballistic Missile combat crews during wartime situation. As a result of this Missile Combat Competition, many Strategic Air Command's crews which was tasked in guarding and operating Intercontinental-Ballistic Missile became more trained in how to operate the Intercontinental-Ballistic Missile during the First-Strike scenario and eventually the Missile Combat Competition became a yearly tradition within the Strategic Air Command. The Strategic Air Command also received a new fleet of Strategic Bombers Aircraft, the General Dynamics F-111 Aardvark a new supersonic and medium-range interdictor bomber aircraft during General Nazzaro tenured as Commander of The Strategic Air Command.

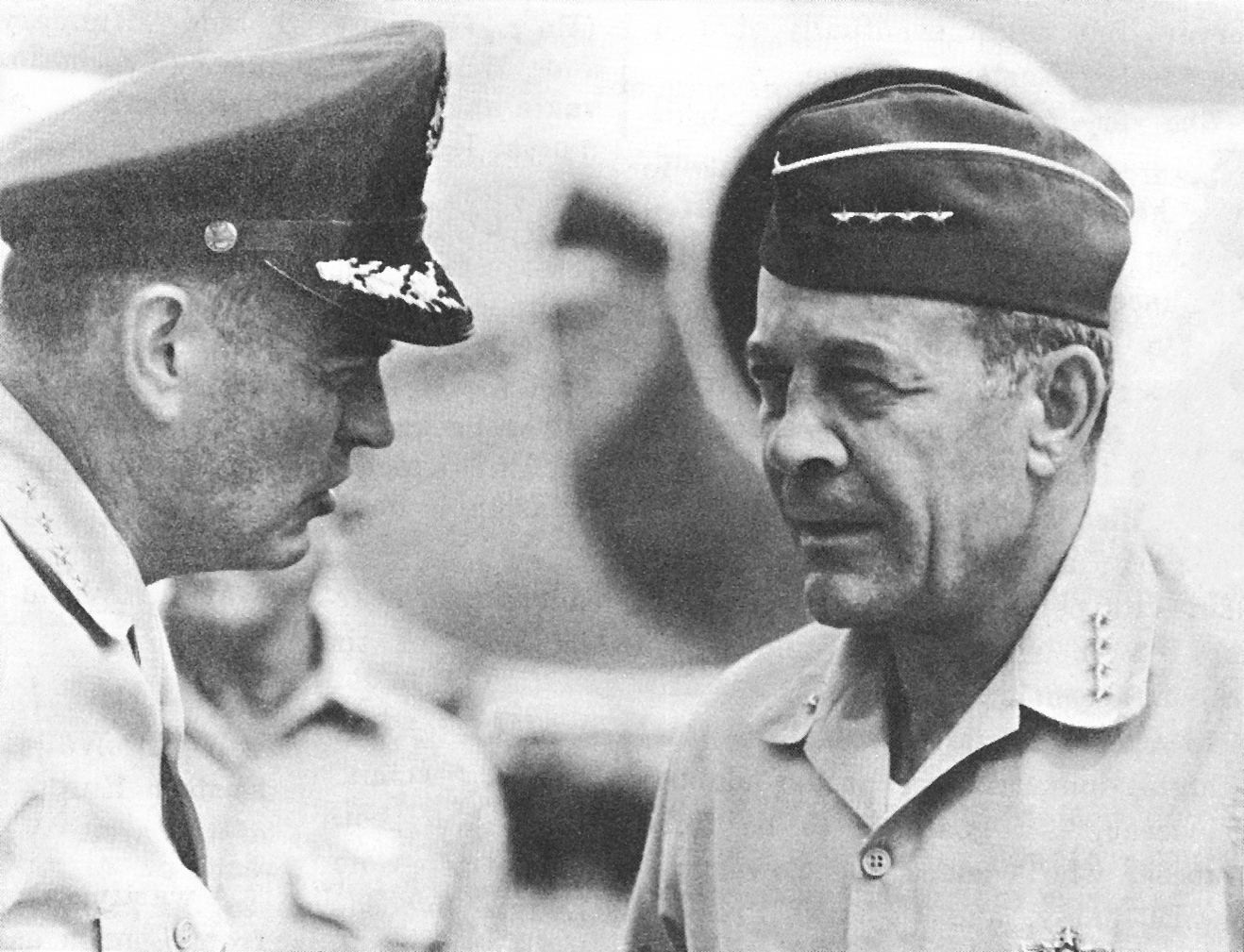
As Commander in Chief, Pacific Air Forces (right), being greeted at Tan Son Nhut Air Base by Gen. George S. Brown, Commander, Seventh Air Force, 1968.

In 1968 following the appointment of General John D. Ryan as the new United States Air Force Vice Chief of Staff, General Nazzaro was appointed to succeeded General John D. Ryan as the new Commanders-in-Chief of the Pacific Air Forces (CINCPACAF). He assumed his duties as commander in chief of Pacific Air Forces with headquarters at Hickam Air Force Base, Hawaii, in August 1968. In this capacity General Nazzaro oversaw all of the United States Air Forces operation within the Pacific region, especially the one in South Vietnam under the Seventh Air Force. During his tenured as Commander of The Pacific Air Forces, General Nazzaro oversaw the last stage of Operation Rolling Thunder, a bombing campaign over North Vietnam during the Vietnam War which ended on November 2, 1968.

General Joseph J. Nazzaro retired from the Air Force on August 1, 1971, after 35 years of active-duty within the United States Air Force and died of cancer at the Tucson Medical Center near his home on February 5, 1990 at age 76. He was buried with military honors at the United States Air Force Academy Cemetery in Colorado Springs, Colorado.

== Awards and decorations ==
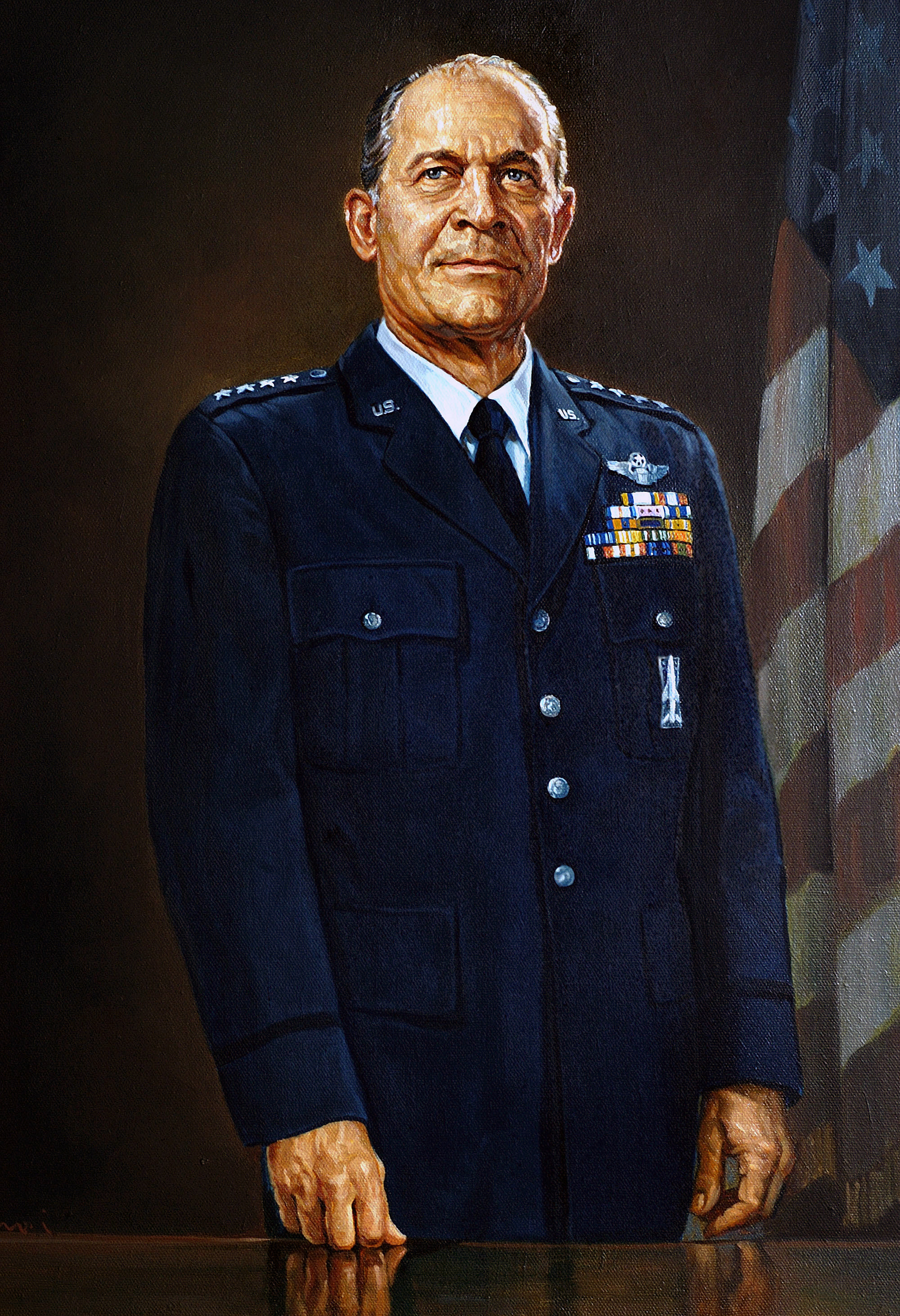
Official Air Force portrait painting of General Joseph J. Nazzaro.

His awards include:

USAF Command Pilot Badge
Air Force Distinguished Service Medal with bronze oak leaf cluster
Army Distinguished Service Medal	Silver Star	Legion of Merit with three bronze oak leaf clusters
Distinguished Flying Cross	Air Medal with bronze oak leaf cluster	Air Force Presidential Unit Citation
American Defense Service Medal with service star	American Campaign Medal	Asiatic–Pacific Campaign Medal
European–African–Middle Eastern Campaign Medal with two bronze campaign stars	World War II Victory Medal	National Defense Service Medal with service star
Army of Occupation Medal with 'Germany' clasp	Air Force Longevity Service Award with one silver and two bronze oak leaf clusters	Croix de Guerre with Palm (France)

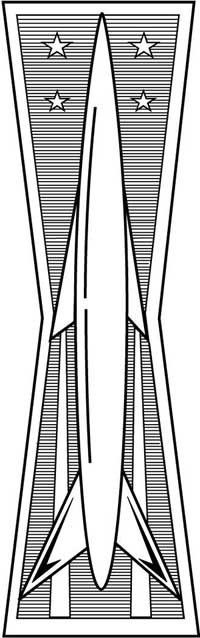

Basic Missile Maintenance Badge

== Gallery ==
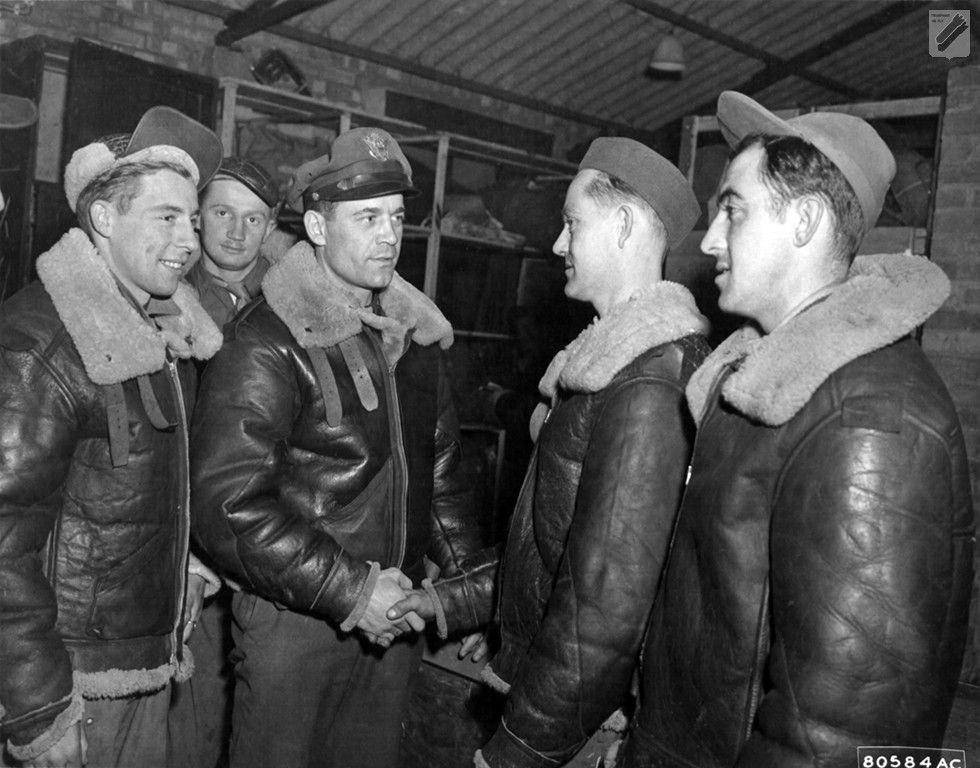
Joseph J. Nazzaro while serving as Eight Air Force deputy director of operations for Strategic Air Forces in Europe during World War II.

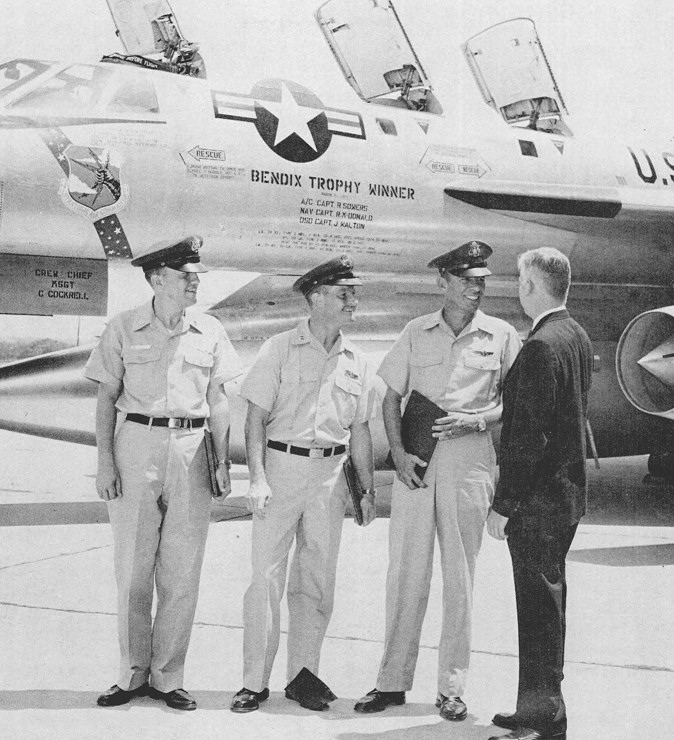
Lieutenant General Joseph J. Nazzaro greeted Under Secretary of the United States Air Force Brockway McMillan during his tenure as Strategic Air Command Vice Commanders-in-Chief at Offutt Air Force, January 17, 1965.

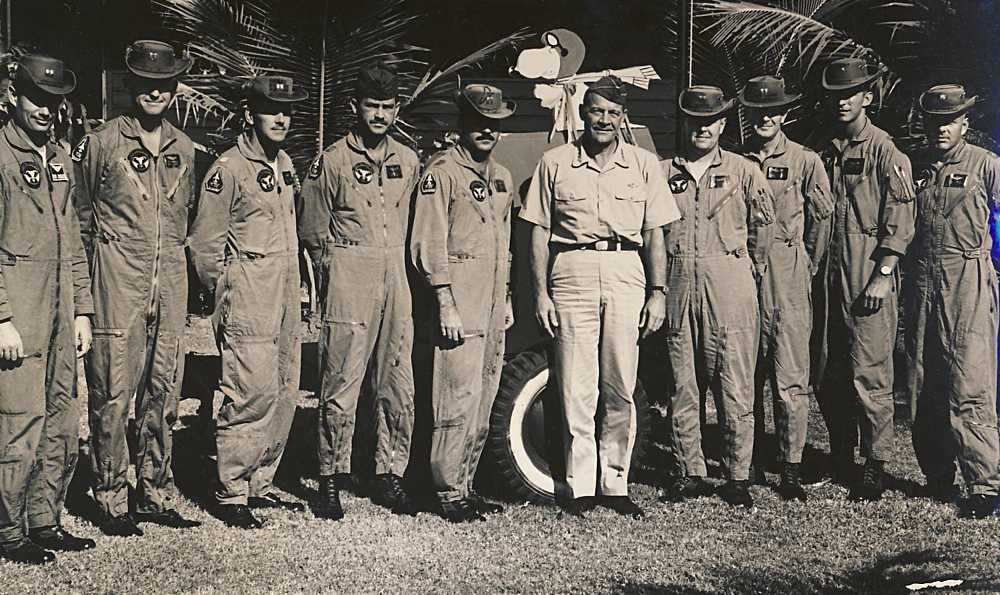
Commander-in-Chief of The Strategic Air Command General Joseph J. Nazzaro during a visit to Korat Air Force Base, Thailand 1968.

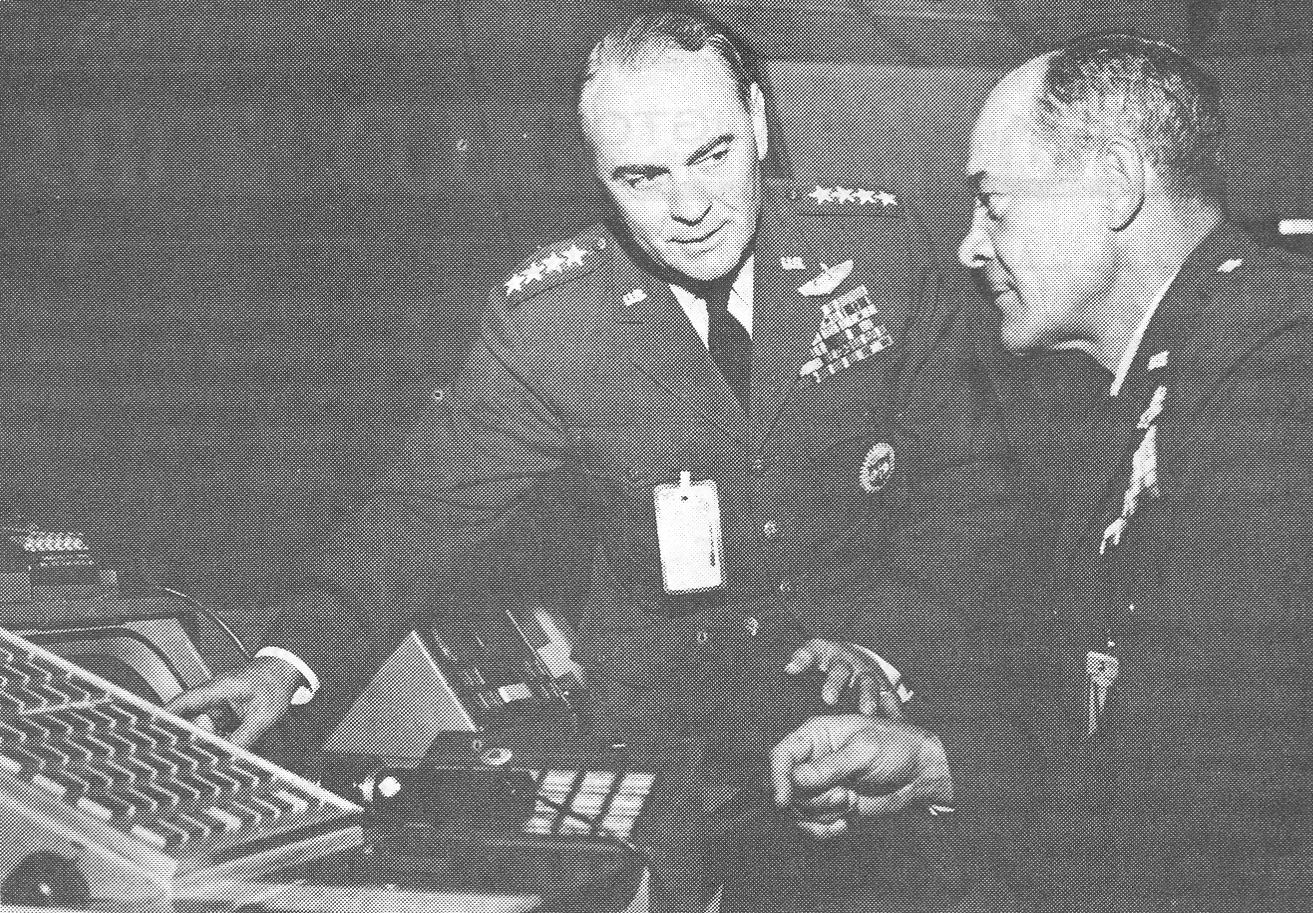
CINCSAC General Joseph J. Nazzaro with Commander of North American Aerospace Defense Command (NORAD) General Raymond J. Reeves during a visit to NORAD Headquarters at Peterson Air Force Base, Colorado 1967.

== See also ==
- List of commanders-in-chief of the Strategic Air Command

Military offices
Preceded by General John D. Ryan	Commanders-in-Chief of The Strategic Air Command; February 1, 1967 – July 31, 1968	Succeeded by General Bruce K. Holloway
Preceded by General John D. Ryan	Commanders-in-Chief of The Pacific Air Forces; August 1, 1968 - August 1, 1971	Succeeded by General Lucius D. Clay Jr.
