= John Dale Ryan =

United States Air Force general

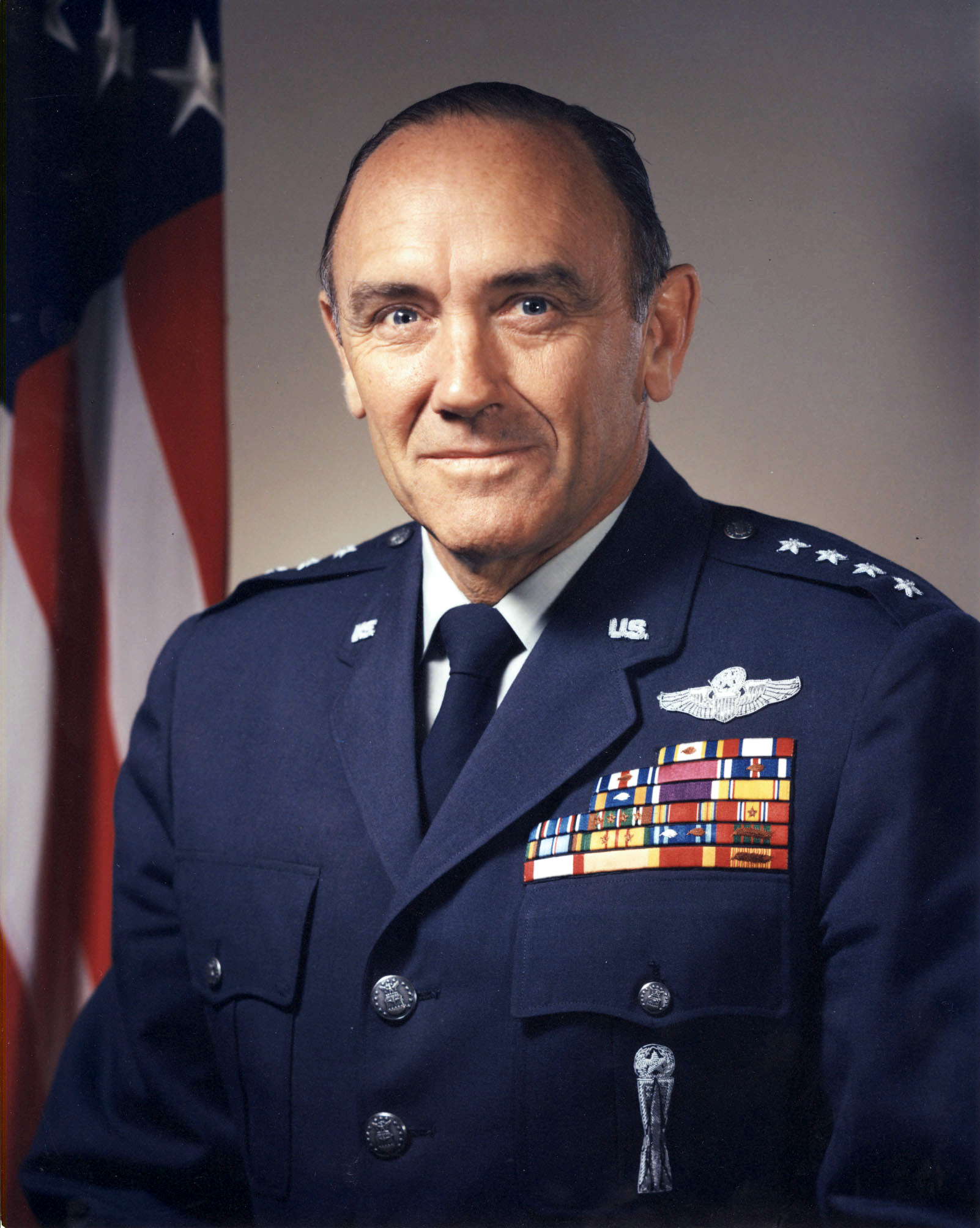
- General John Dale Ryan
- Born: December 10, 1915; Cherokee, Iowa, US
- Died: October 27, 1983 (aged 67); Lackland Air Force Base, Texas, US
- Burial place: United States Air Force Academy Cemetery
- Relatives: General Michael E. Ryan (son)
- Military career
- Allegiance: United States
- Branch: United States Air Force
- Service years: 1938–1973
- Rank: General
- Nickname: "Three-fingered Jack"
- Commands: Chief of Staff of the United States Air Force; Vice Chief of Staff of the United States Air Force; Pacific Air Forces; Strategic Air Command; Second Air Force; Sixteenth Air Force; 810th Air Division; 97th Bombardment Wing; 509th Bombardment Group; 2d Bombardment Group
- Conflicts: World War II; Vietnam War
- Awards: Air Force Distinguished Service Medal (5); Army Distinguished Service Medal; Silver Star (2); Legion of Merit; Distinguished Flying Cross (2); Air Medal (6); Full list

General John Dale Ryan (December 10, 1915 – October 27, 1983) was the seventh Chief of Staff of the United States Air Force. As chief of staff of the U.S. Air Force, General Ryan served in a dual capacity. He was a member of the Joint Chiefs of Staff, which, as a body, acts as the principal military advisers to the president, the National Security Council, and the Secretary of Defense. In his other capacity, he was responsible to the Secretary of the Air Force for managing the vast human and materiel resources of the world's most powerful aerospace force.

In May 1972, Ryan was the subject of one of President Richard Nixon's more severe rants.

== Early life ==
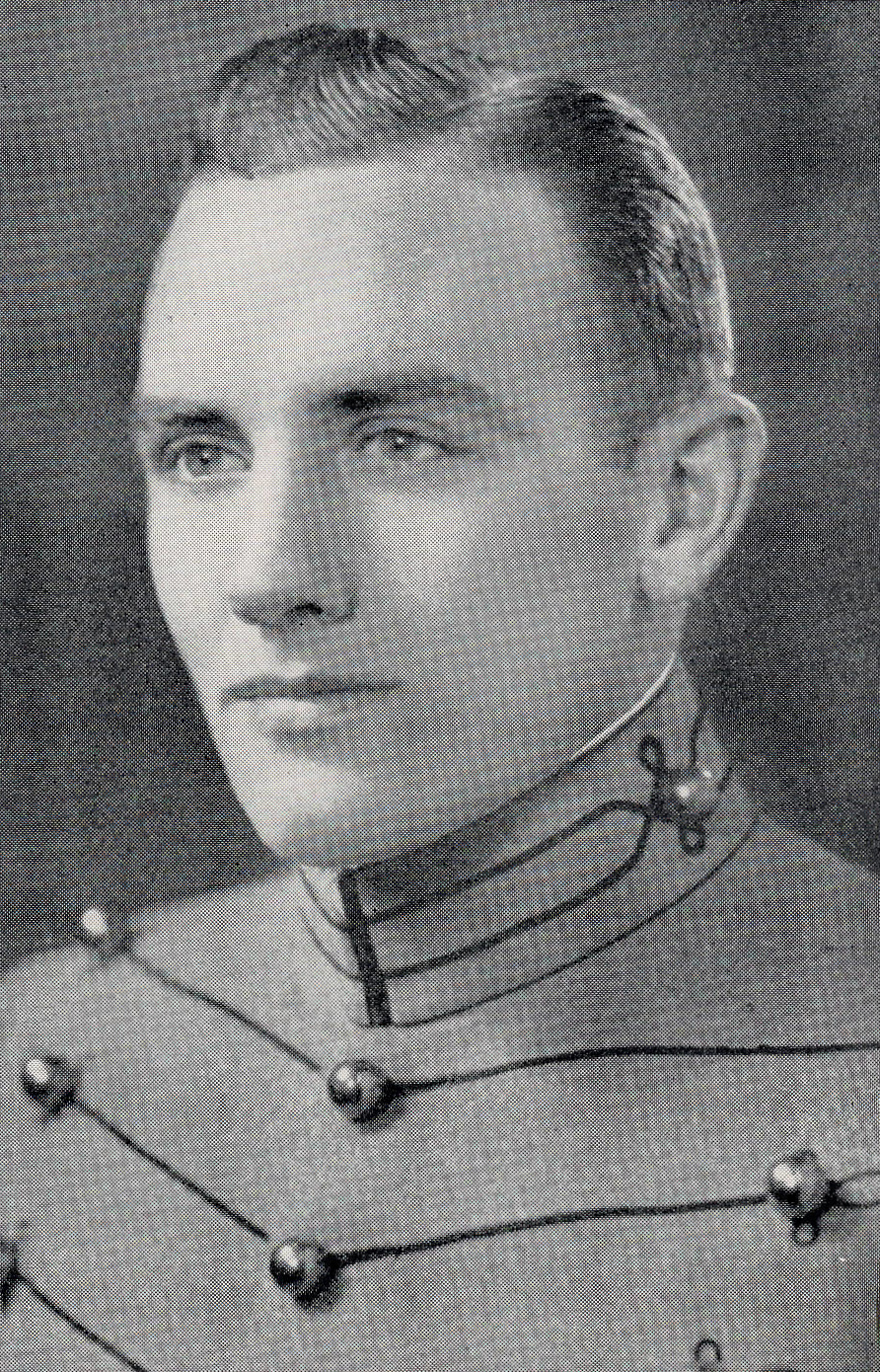
Ryan as a United States Military Academy cadet c. 1938

John Dale Ryan was born in Cherokee, Iowa, on December 10, 1915. Following graduation from Cherokee Junior College in 1934, he entered the United States Military Academy, played varsity football, and graduated in 1938. He next attended pilot training in Texas at Randolph and Kelly fields, and received his pilot wings in 1939.

== Military career ==
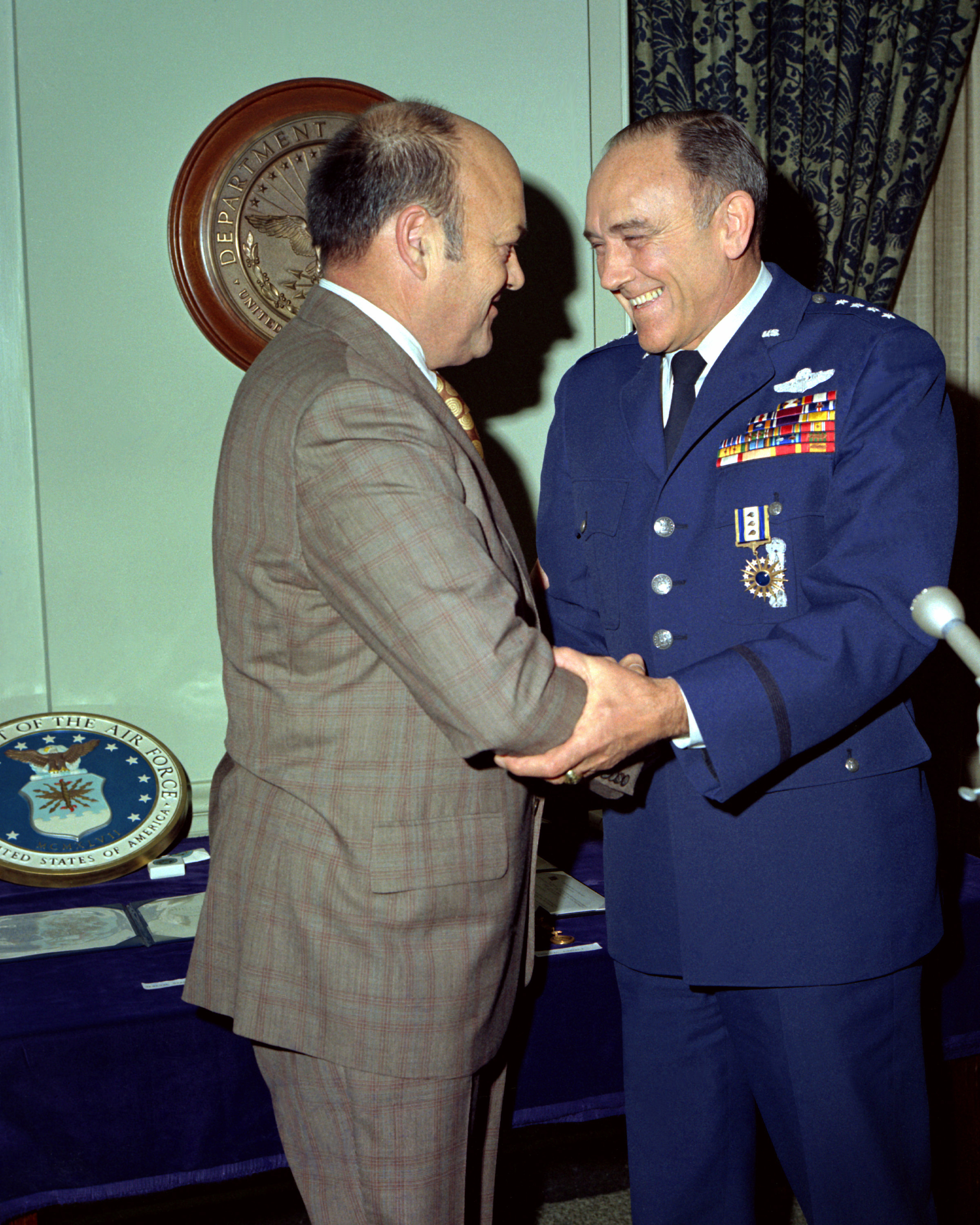
Air Force Chief of Staff General John D. Ryan with U.S. Secretary of Defense Melvin R. Laird.

Ryan remained at Kelly Field as a flight instructor for approximately two years. From January 1942 until August 1943, he was director of training at Midland Army Airfield, Texas, and was instrumental in establishing an advanced bombardier training school. His next assignment was as operations officer for the Second Air Force at Colorado Springs, Colorado. In February 1944, he was transferred to Italy, where he commanded the 2d Bombardment Group and later became operations officer for the 5th Bombardment Wing, Fifteenth Air Force. While commanding the 2d Bombardment Group he lost a finger to enemy anti-aircraft fire. Later on, this resulted in his nickname, sometimes used derisively, "Three-fingered Jack."

Ryan returned to Texas in April 1945, and became deputy air base commander at Midland Army Airfield. In September, he was assigned to the Air Training Command at Fort Worth and Randolph Field, where he remained until April 1946, when he assumed duties with the 58th Bombardment Wing and participated in the Bikini Atoll atomic weapons tests.

From September 1946 to July 1948, he was assistant chief of staff for pilots of the 58th Bombardment Wing and then Eighth Air Force director of operations. For the next three years, he commanded the 509th Bombardment Group at Walker Air Force Base, New Mexico. Between July 1951 and June 1956, Ryan commanded the 97th Bombardment Wing and the 810th Air Division, both at Biggs Air Force Base, Texas, and the 19th Air Division at Carswell Air Force Base, Texas.

Ryan became director of materiel for the Strategic Air Command in June 1956, and four years later assumed command of SAC's Sixteenth Air Force in Spain. In July 1961, he was named commander of the Second Air Force at Barksdale Air Force Base, Louisiana. In August 1963, Ryan was assigned to the Pentagon as Inspector General of the Air Force. A year later, he was named vice commander in chief of the Strategic Air Command (SAC) at Offutt Air Force Base, Nebraska.

== Strategic Air Command ==
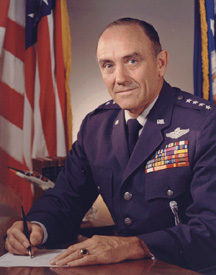
General John D. Ryan during his tenured as Commander-in-Chief of the Strategic Air Command.

In November 1964 Ryan was appointed as the next Commander-in-Chief of The Strategic Air Command (CINCSAC) following the retirement of the current CINCSAC General Thomas S. Power. Ryan assumed his duties as CINCSAC On December 1, 1964, and became its fourth commander in chief and was the first CINCSAC to be educated at West Point. During his tenure as Strategic Air Command Commander, Ryan oversaw the early staged of Strategic Bombing campaign during the Vietnam War and also Strategic Air Command role within the war. As part of the Strategic Air Command involvement in the Vietnam War, Ryan under the direction of Secretary of Defense Robert McNamara ordered the deployment of several Strategic Air Command fleet of B-52 Stratofortress and Boeing KC-135 Stratotanker into Southeast Asia. The B-52 and Boeing KC-135 fleet was then deployed into U-Tapao Royal Thai Navy Airfield following an agreement with Governments of Thailand and operating the base in-cooperation with Royal Thai Navy. As a result, the U-Tapao airbase became the main Strategic Air Command base for its Southeast Asian operation, especially for its operation for the Vietnam War air campaign.

Ryan also the early staged of Operation Arc Light, which purpose was to provide bombing support that include enemy bases and supply routes and also providing air support for ground combat operations. In order to support the Operation Arc Light, several fleet of Strategic Air Command's Bombers Aircraft, including its fleet of B-52 Stratofortress was deployed into Andersen Air Force Base in Guam and Kadena Air Force Base in Okinawa, Japan. Operation Arc Light played crucial role in the strategic bombing campaign during the Vietnam War and especially in providing the bombing air support to ground combat troops in the battlefield of Vietnam.

On February 1, 1967, Ryan was assigned as commander in chief, of The Pacific Air Forces and was succeeded by his Vice Commanders-in-Chief General Joseph J. Nazzaro, who assumed Ryan's position as Strategic Air Command Commanders-in-Chief.

== Air Force Chief of Staff ==
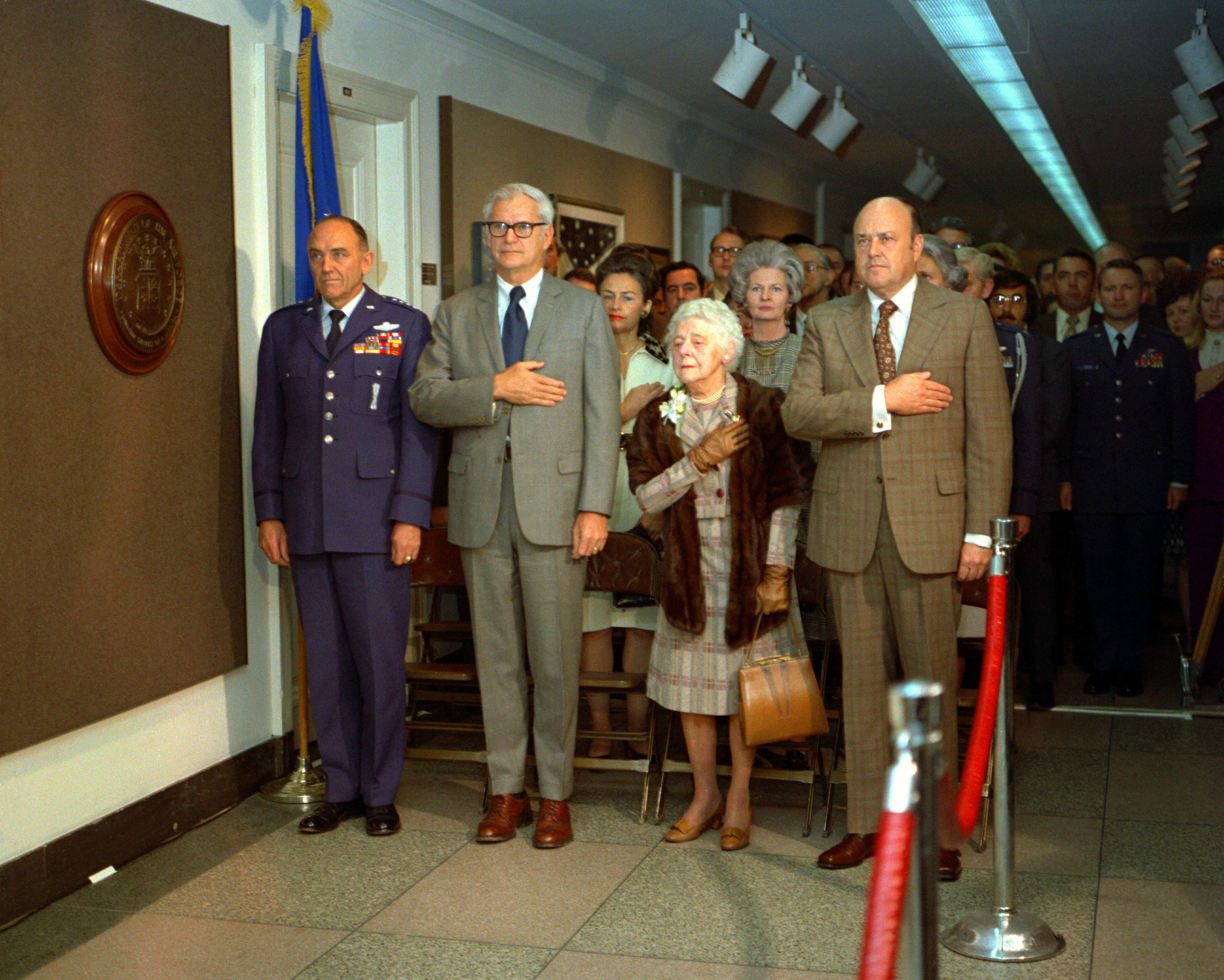
Air Force Chief of Staff General John D. Ryan with Secretary of The Air Force Robert C. Seamans and Secretary of Defense Melvin R. Laird at a ceremony in The Pentagon.

Ryan returned to the Pentagon as Vice Chief of Staff of The United States Air Force in August 1968, following the appointment of the previous Air Force Vice Chief of Staff, General Bruce K. Holloway, as Commander of the Strategic Air Command. In July 1969 following the retirement of Air Force Chief of Staff General John P. McConnell, Ryan was appointed by President Richard Nixon as Chief of Staff of The United States Air Force in August 1969. One of the more controversial moves of his tenure was the disbandment of the U.S. Air Force Pipes and Drums, the only free-standing, full-time pipe band in the U.S. armed forces.

Ryan's tenure as commander of PACAF and later as Air Force Chief of Staff also engendered controversy when he was described as one of a group that helped destroy General Jack Lavelle's career after Lavelle gave fighter pilots permission to shoot back at bona fide threats, something previously denied them by rules of engagement. This was also related to the court-martial of Colonel Jack Broughton, after Broughton attempted to protect one of his pilots who shot back at an anti-aircraft position also in apparent violation of rules of engagement. Ryan's "undue command influence" later resulted in the overturning and expungement of Broughton's conviction by the USAF Board for the Correction of Military Records. During his tenure as Air Force Chief of Staff, Ryan also realized that the Air Force was in need of a complete overhaul that emphasized training, readiness and understanding.

According to Mark Perry 1989 military history book Four Stars: The Inside Story of The Forty-Year Battle Between The Joint Chiefs of Staff and America's Civilian Leaders, Ryan was considered one of the Air Force's major air power strategists in the end of 1960s and was one of the able successors to Curtis LeMay and Thomas D. White. Ryan was also quoted as one of the military's leading critics of the can-do spirit which permeated the New Frontier-Great Society national Leadership. Ryan was also quoted as one of the more outspoken and "stronger Chiefs" within the Joint Chiefs of Staff parlance, especially regarding the slanting of a policy or story that far beyond the truth.

General Ryan retired from active-duty within the United States Air Force on July 31, 1973, following 35 years of service within the Air Force. He was succeeded by General George S. Brown who assumed Ryan's position as Chief of Staff of The United States Air Force and was previously served as Commanders of Air Force System Command.

== Family and death ==
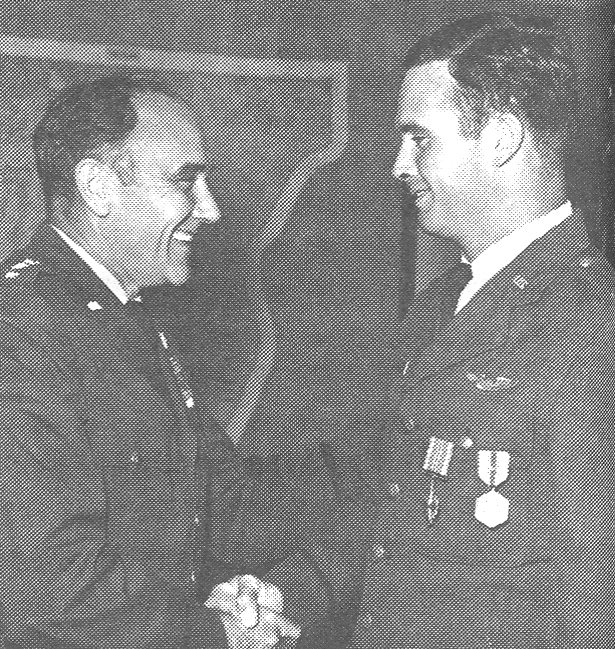
Presenting Distinguished Flying Cross to his son, Captain Michael E. Ryan (right), 1969.

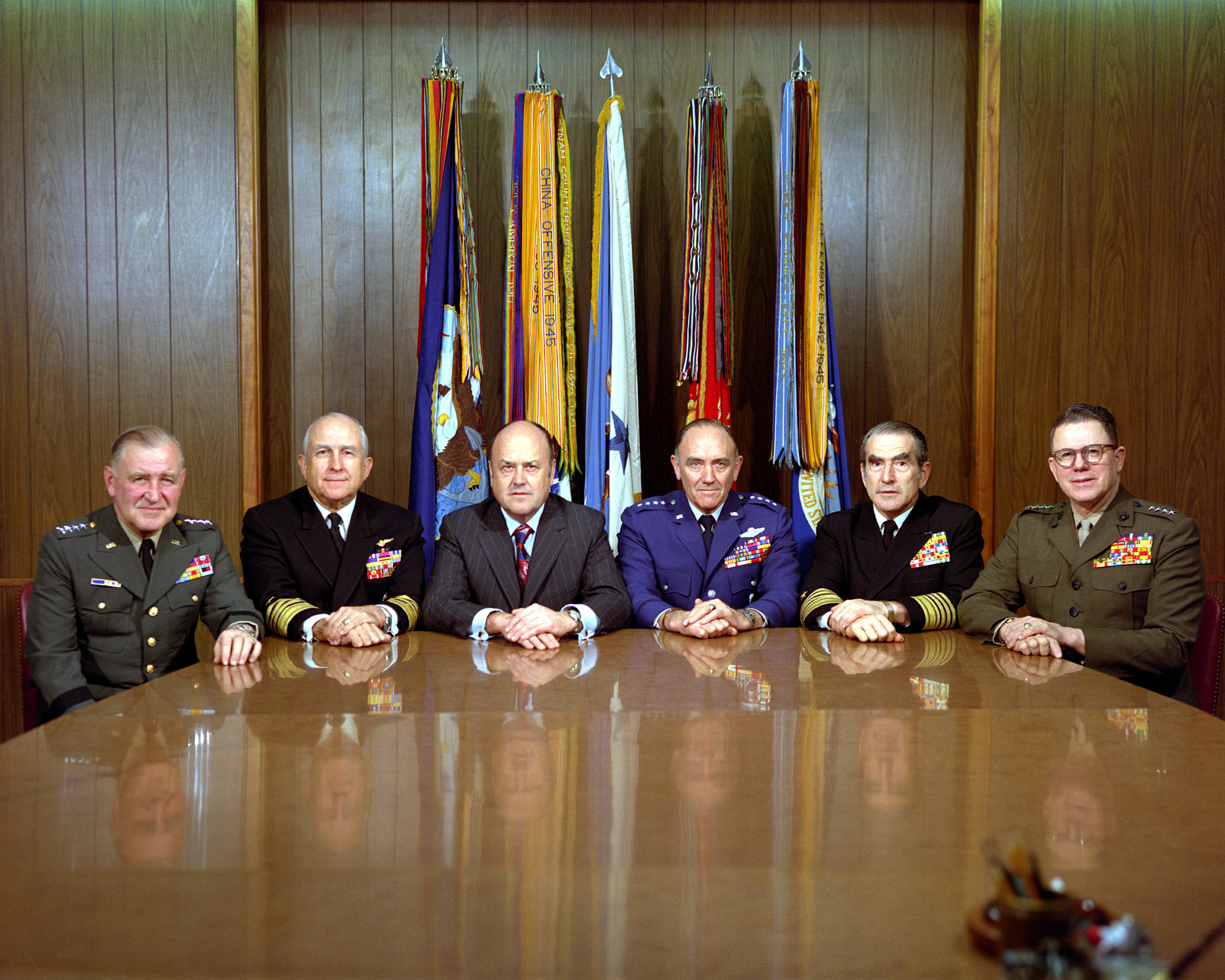
General John D. Ryan with Secretary of Defense Melvin R. Laird and the other members of The Joint Chiefs of Staff at The Pentagon on January 5, 1973.

Ryan's son, General Michael E. Ryan, also held the position of chief of staff. Unlike the elder Ryan's career as bomber pilot, the younger Ryan (b. 1941) and his brother John (1940–1970) were both fighter pilots.

Ryan died of a heart attack at age 67 on October 27, 1983, while hospitalized at the Air Force's Wilford Hall Medical Center adjacent to Lackland AFB in San Antonio, Texas. He was later buried with full military honors at the United States Air Force Academy Cemetery in Colorado Springs, Colorado. He was survived by his wife, the former Jo Carolyn Guidera, his son, Colonel (later General) Michael E. Ryan, and a daughter, Patricia Jo Ryan. Another son, Captain John D. Ryan, Jr., was killed in 1970 when his F-4 Phantom II crashed into San Pablo Bay during a training mission, shortly after takeoff from Hamilton AFB in Marin County, California.

== Awards and decorations ==
* US Air Force Command Pilot Badge
- Master Missileman Badge (basic Missileman Badge depicted)
- Philippine Air Force Gold Wings Badge

Personal decorations
	Air Force Distinguished Service Medal with four bronze oak leaf clusters
	Army Distinguished Service Medal
	Silver Star with bronze oak leaf cluster
Width-44 crimson ribbon with a pair of width-2 white stripes on the edges	Legion of Merit
	Distinguished Flying Cross with bronze oak leaf cluster
	Air Medal with silver oak leaf cluster
	Purple Heart
Campaign and service medals
	American Defense Service Medal
	American Campaign Medal
	European-African-Middle Eastern Campaign Medal with four bronze campaign stars
	World War II Victory Medal
	National Defense Service Medal with bronze service star
	Armed Forces Expeditionary Medal
	Vietnam Service Medal with two bronze service stars
Service, training, and marksmanship awards
	Air Force Longevity Service Award with silver and two bronze oak leaf clusters
Foreign awards
	French Legion of Honour, Commandeur Medal
	French World War II Croix de Guerre with bronze palm
	Chinese Order of the Cloud and Banner, 1st Grade with Special Grand Cordon
	South Korean Order of National Security Merit, Tong-il Medal
	National Order of Vietnam, Commander
	Vietnam Gallantry Cross with palm
	Great Star for Military Merit, Chile
	Greek Order of the Phoenix, Grand Cross
	Spanish Order of Aeronautical Merit, Grand Cross with Red Decoration
	Brazilian Order of Aeronautical Merit, Grand Official
	Vietnam Gallantry Cross Unit Award
	Vietnam Campaign Medal

=== Other achievements ===
In December 1962, he joined a select group of athletes, who have been successful in their professional careers since their college football days, when he was chosen a member of the Sports Illustrated Silver Anniversary All-American team. He received an honorary doctor of laws degree from Creighton University, Omaha, Nebraska, on May 30, 1966; and an honorary doctor of laws degree from the University of Akron, Ohio, on June 5, 1967.

In July 1971, Ryan became the first foreign dignitary to receive the Golden Wings of the Philippine Air Force. Additional foreign decorations are Chilean Military Star of the Armed Forces, Class of Great Star for Military Merit.

Military offices
Preceded by Gen. John P. McConnell	Chief of Staff of the United States Air Force; 1969–1973	Succeeded by Gen. George S. Brown
Preceded by Gen. Thomas S. Power	Commander, Strategic Air Command; 1964–1967	Succeeded by Gen. Joseph J. Nazzaro
Preceded by Lt Gen. William H. Blanchard	Inspector General of the United States Air Force; 1963–1964	Succeeded by Lt Gen. Keith K. Compton
