= 38th Air Division =

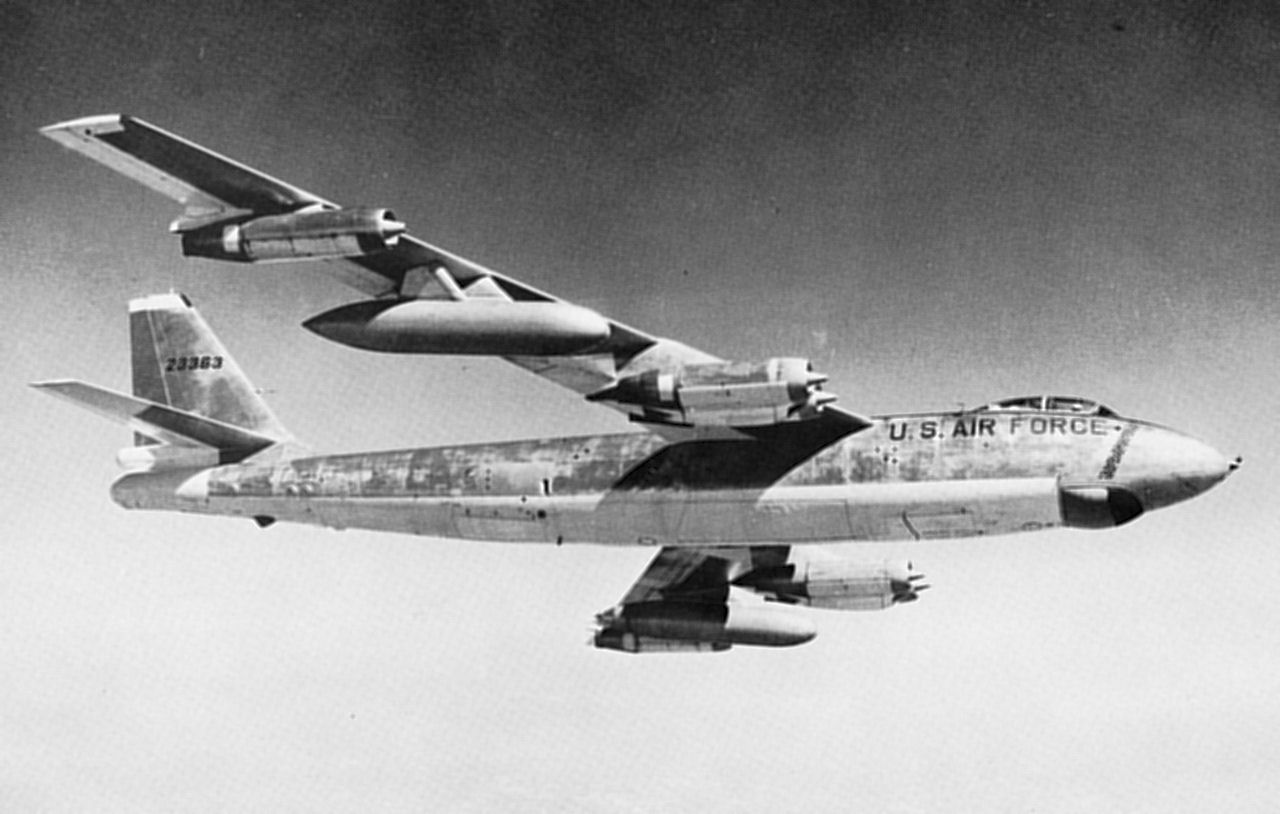
- B-47E from Hunter AFB
- Active: 1951–1959
- Country: United States
- Branch: United States Air Force
- Role: Command of strategic strike forces
- Part of: Strategic Air Command
- Decorations: Air Force Outstanding Unit Award

Commanders
- Notable commanders: Gen Joseph J. Nazzaro

Insignia
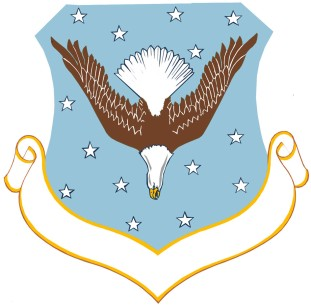
- 38th Air Division emblem (Approved 16 August 1966)

The 38th Air Division is an inactive United States Air Force unit. It was last stationed at Hunter Air Force Base, as part of Second Air Force of Strategic Air Command. The division was inactivated there on 1 November 1959.

== History ==
"The 38th Air Division began on 10 October 1951 at Hunter Air Force Base, Georgia, to develop and prepare policies and procedures pertaining to bombardment, air and ground training, operations, flying safety, and security. It also monitored and coordinated the manning, training, equipping and operational readiness of assigned units for the primary purpose of conducting strategic air warfare on a global scale. Its subordinate units participated in numerous training missions, which included simulated radar bombing and polar grid navigation, plus the Strategic Air Command bombing and navigation competition. During the 1950s, the division participated in and supported exercises such as Operations War Dance, Grey Warrior and Dark Night, and flew numerous air refueling sorties."

== Lineage ==
- Established as the 38 Air Division and organized on 10 October 1951
- Discontinued on 16 June 1952
- Activated on 16 June 1952
- Inactivated on 1 November 1959

=== Assignments ===
- Second Air Force, 10 October 1951
- Eighth Air Force, 1 January 1959 – 1 November 1959

=== Components ===
Wings

- 2d Bombardment Wing: 10 October 1951 – 1 November 1959
- 308th Bombardment Wing: 10 October 1951 – 15 July 1959 (detached 10 October 1951 – 7 April 1952, 21 August 1956–c.26 October 1956)

Squadrons

- 303d Air Refueling Squadron: 1 January 1959 – 1 October 1959

Stations

- Hunter Air Force Base Georgia, 10 October 1951 – 1 November 1959

=== Aircraft ===
- Boeing KB-29 Superfortress, 1951–1953
- Boeing B-50 Superfortress, 1951–1953
- Boeing KC-97 Stratofreighter, 1953–1959
- Boeing B-47 Stratojet, 1954–1959

=== Decorations ===
- Air Force Outstanding Unit Award: 1 November 1956 – 1 April 1957

=== Emblem ===
On a shield azure (Brittany blue), a semee of stars argent (white, outlined stone blue), over all an American bald eagle, volant recursant descendant, in pale, wings overture, all proper (head and tail white, body feathers shades of brown, beak and eyeball yellow, outlined stone blue). (Approved 16 August 1956)

=== Commanders ===
- Brigadier General F. E. Glantzberg, 18 October 1951
- Brigadier General Sydney D. Grubbs Jr., 27 February 1952
- Brigadier General Joseph J. Nazzaro, 26 January 1953
- Colonel John F. Batjer, 20 May 1955
- Brigadier General Charles B. Dougher, 15 August 1955
- Brigadier General John E. Dougherty, 23 June 1958
- Colonel William B. Kieffer, 4 September 1959 – 1 November 1959

== See also ==
- List of United States Air Force air divisions
