= Bruce K. Holloway =

United States Air Force general (1912–1999)

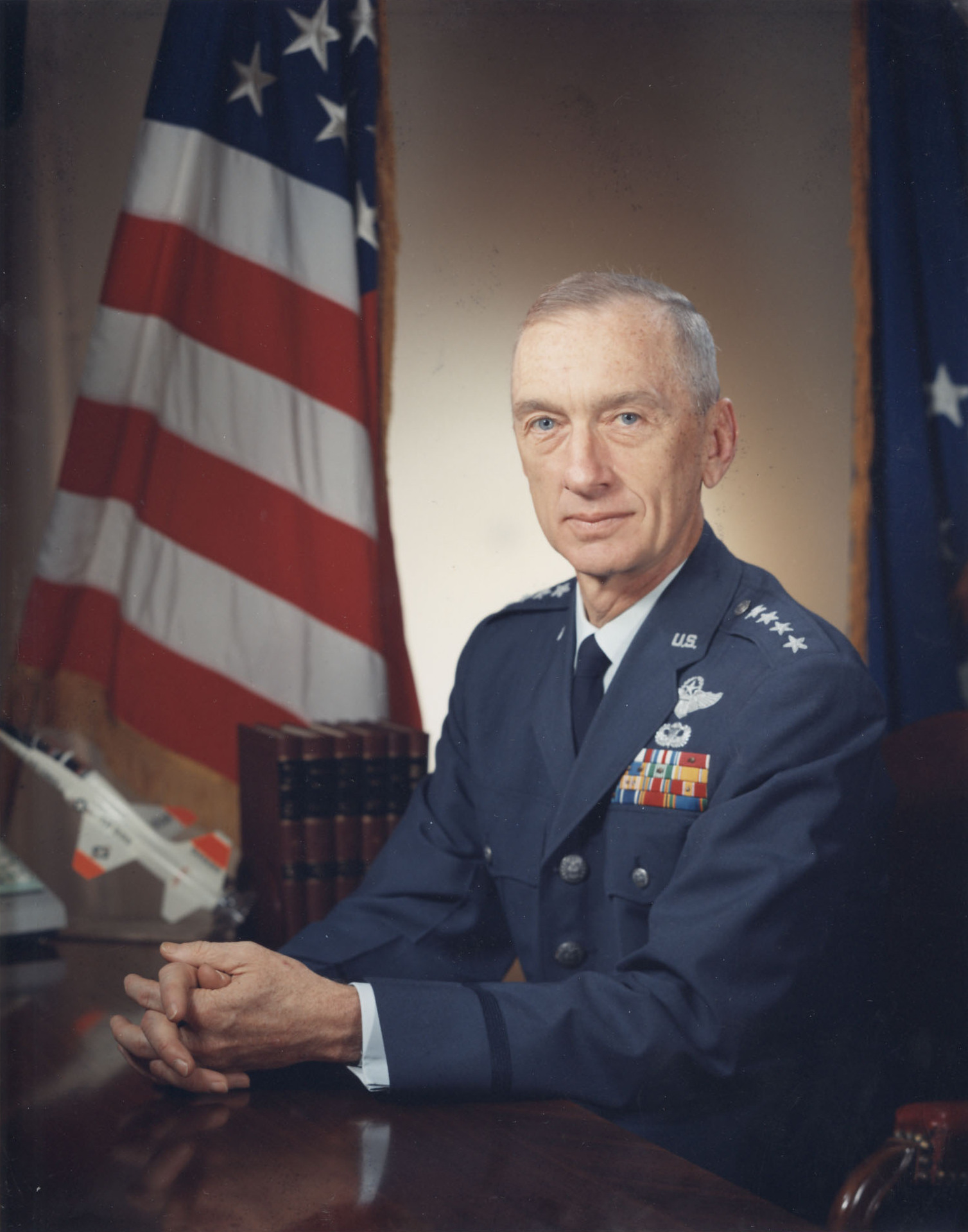
- General Bruce K. Holloway
- Born: September 1, 1912; Knoxville, Tennessee, U.S.
- Died: September 30, 1999 (aged 87); Orlando, Florida, U.S.
- Military career
- Allegiance: United States
- Branch: United States Army Air Forces; United States Air Force
- Service years: 1937–1972
- Rank: General
- Commands: Strategic Air Command (1968–72); U.S. Air Forces in Europe (1965–66)
- Conflicts: World War II
- Awards: Air Force Distinguished Service Medal (2); Army Distinguished Service Medal; Silver Star; Legion of Merit (2); Distinguished Flying Cross (2); Air Medal (3)

General Bruce Keener Holloway (September 1, 1912 – September 30, 1999) was a United States Air Force general. A West Point graduate, he was a fighter ace with the United States Army Air Forces in World War II, when he commanded the 23rd Fighter Group in China. He later commanded U.S. Air Forces in Europe, served as Vice Chief of Staff of the United States Air Force and was commander in chief of the Strategic Air Command from 1968 to 1972.

== Early life and education ==
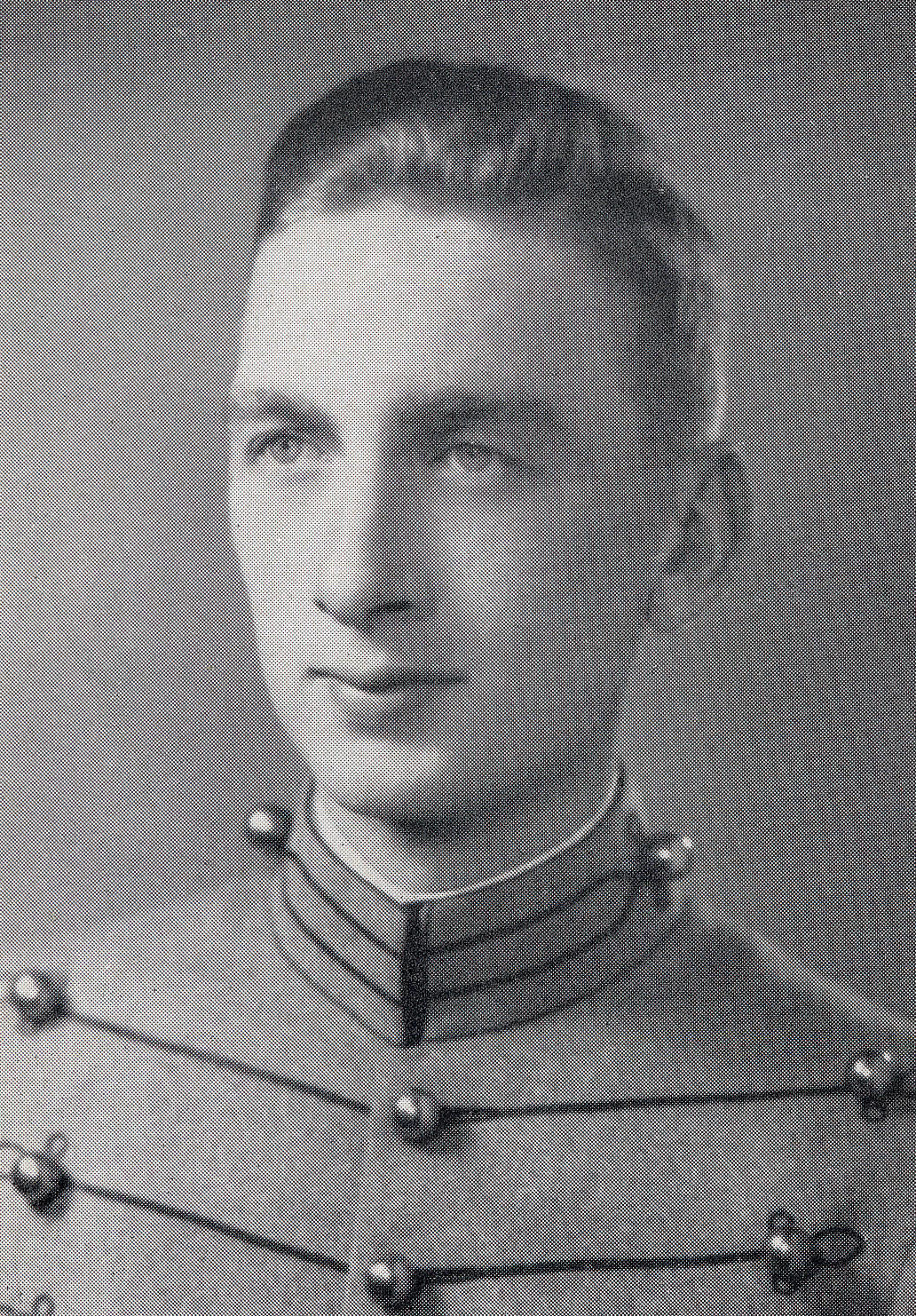
Holloway as a United States Military Academy cadet c. 1937

Holloway was born on September 1, 1912, in Knoxville, Tennessee, one of two children of Frank P. Holloway, a mill owner, and Elizabeth Keener, a homemaker. He graduated from Knoxville High School in 1929 and studied engineering at the University of Tennessee from 1929 to 1931. He then attended Marion Military Institute to prepare for an appointment to the United States Military Academy, from which he graduated in 1937.

Holloway was commissioned a second lieutenant of cavalry in June 1937 and began duty with the Army Air Corps that September. He received his pilot wings at Kelly Field, San Antonio, Texas, in 1938, and then served for two years in Hawaii with the 6th Pursuit Squadron and the 18th Pursuit Group. At Wheeler Field, he was a flight leader in the 6th Pursuit Squadron, flying the Boeing P-26 Peashooter and later the Curtiss P-36. In May 1940, he hoped to volunteer for the program to send American pilots to China, but it was limited to reservists. After returning to the mainland United States in 1941, he took a postgraduate course in aeronautical engineering at the California Institute of Technology.

== World War II ==
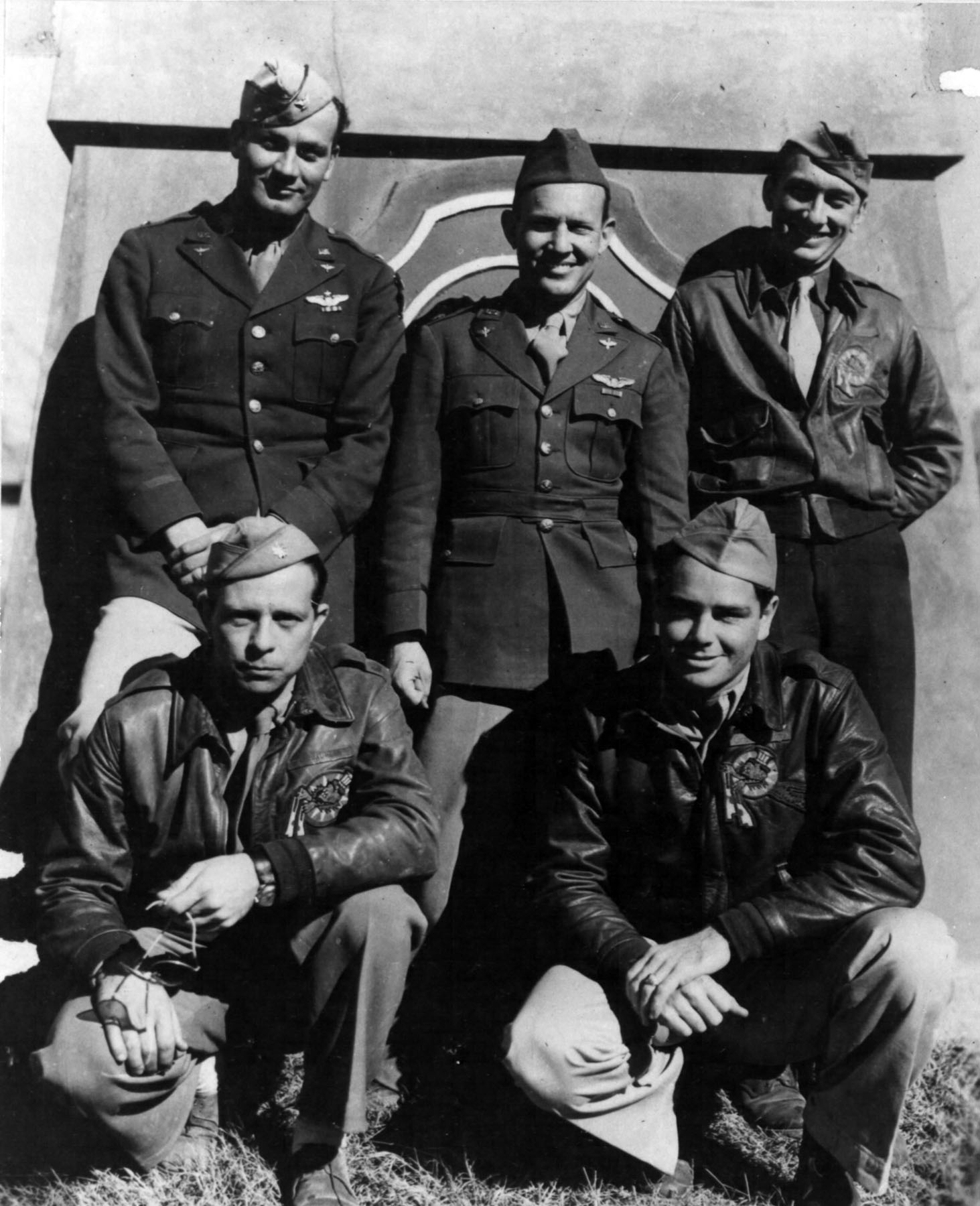
Claire Chennault's fighter commanders in China. Holloway is standing right.

In May 1942, after the United States had entered World War II, Holloway went to China as an observer with the China Air Task Force. He flew combat missions with Claire Chennault's American Volunteer Group (AVG), the Flying Tigers, before it was disbanded on July 4, 1942, to form the nucleus of the 23rd Fighter Group. He commanded the 76th Fighter Squadron and served as operations officer of the new group, and he took command of the 23rd Fighter Group in January 1943. During about 18 months in China, he rose from major to colonel, and he later commanded the advance echelon of the Fourteenth Air Force.

Holloway flew 110 missions in 19 months of combat and shot down 13 Japanese aircraft, becoming one of the first aces of the Army Air Forces in the war. In April 1943, he flew a solo reconnaissance mission across the Strait of Formosa, found Japanese bombers near Taihoku and Sinchiku, and shot down an enemy bomber on the way back "with about 15 rounds". The aviation writer Edward H. Sims devoted the third chapter of his book American Aces in Great Fighter Battles of World War II to one of Holloway's flights over Kunming on May 15, 1943.

At the request of the Yunnan provincial government, Holloway once led three P-40s to Chungtien, where six fragmentation bombs lifted a siege of the town by bandits. While strafing trucks west of the Salween River in Burma, he was hit by ground fire, but his engine ran for about three minutes without oil pressure, long enough for him to reach China. Chinese peasants then helped him make a five-day journey back to his base. He kept a diary of his combat tour, which remained unpublished.

Holloway returned to the United States in November 1943 as the leading ace of the China–Burma–India theater, while his official biography gives the year as 1944.

== Postwar career ==
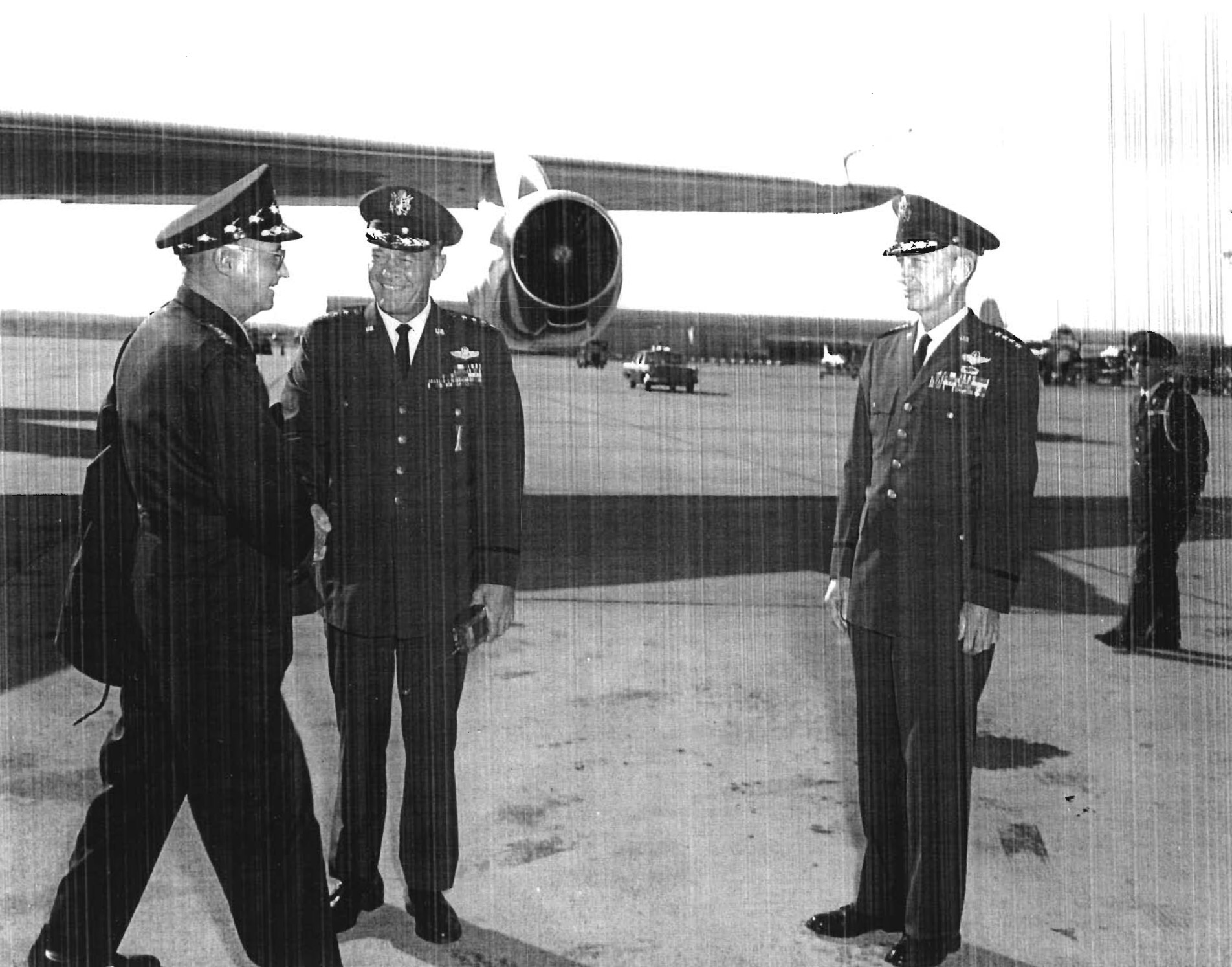
Holloway, as Vice Chief of Staff, with General Joseph J. Nazzaro greeting the Air Force Chief of Staff, General John P. McConnell, in Omaha, Nebraska, on August 1, 1968

=== Jet fighters and air defense ===
From January 30 to July 3, 1946, Holloway commanded the 412th Fighter Group at March Field, California, which his official biography describes as the Army Air Forces' first jet-equipped fighter group. The group flew the Lockheed P-80 Shooting Star, and his biography credits him with pioneering the new field of tactical jet air operations. The group had been formed as an experimental unit to test jet aircraft and to train pilots for front-line jet service, and it was inactivated on July 3, 1946.

Holloway was in the first class of the Air Command and Staff School, graduating in 1947. He then served at the headquarters of Air Defense Command as director of air defense from 1947 to 1948 and as deputy for operations from 1949 to 1950.

=== Headquarters and Tactical Air Command ===
After graduating from the National War College in 1951, Holloway held staff posts in operations and development at Headquarters U.S. Air Force. His papers from 1951 and 1952 include correspondence on air defense, research and development, and Project Lincoln. He was deputy director for requirements at Headquarters U.S. Air Force from 1953 to 1955, and he was promoted to brigadier general on October 9, 1953.

From 1955 to 1959, Holloway served in Tactical Air Command as deputy commander of the Ninth Air Force and then the Twelfth Air Force. At the Ninth Air Force, he contributed to new fighter concepts, and he was promoted to major general on August 5, 1957. From 1959 to 1961, he was director of operational requirements at Headquarters U.S. Air Force, where he played a key role in preparing and evaluating proposals for aircraft and missiles. In that post, he guided the development of the TFX tactical fighter.

=== Strike Command ===
In 1961, Holloway received his third star and became deputy commander in chief of the U.S. Strike Command at MacDill Air Force Base, Florida, under General Paul D. Adams. Secretary of Defense Robert McNamara had established the unified command on September 19, 1961, to provide combat-ready forces from Tactical Air Command and the Continental Army Command that could respond quickly to threats anywhere in the world. Holloway was one of the key officers chosen for the new command, and he completed parachute training and earned the Army parachutist badge.

In 1962, Holloway said that single control of air and ground forces would allow joint exercises to "inject more realism and assure a better approach to evaluating air-ground doctrine", and that "air superiority, battlefield isolation, direct support" remained the main tasks of tactical airpower. He described the goals of the TFX as "freedom from concrete, freedom from tankers, freedom from specialization". Later in the assignment, he also served as deputy commander in chief of the Middle East, Southern Asia and Africa South of the Sahara Command.

== Senior commands ==
=== U.S. Air Forces in Europe ===
In July 1965, Holloway took command of U.S. Air Forces in Europe, and he was promoted to full general on August 1, 1965. On March 7, 1966, French president Charles de Gaulle announced France's withdrawal from NATO's integrated military structure and gave NATO forces one year to leave the country. The resulting relocation, known as FRELOC (Fast Relocation), began during Holloway's command. U.S. Air Forces in Europe eventually vacated five operational bases and four standby bases in France, and moved most of its units to the United Kingdom and some to West Germany.

=== Vice Chief of Staff ===
On August 1, 1966, Holloway became Vice Chief of Staff of the United States Air Force at the Pentagon, and he held the post until 1968.

=== Strategic Air Command ===
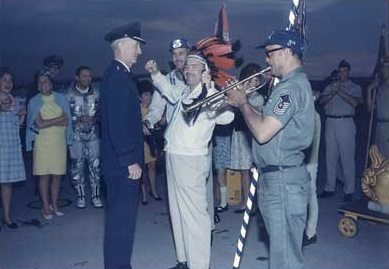
Holloway as commander in chief of Strategic Air Command during a visit to Beale Air Force Base on April 9, 1970

On August 1, 1968, Holloway became commander in chief of the Strategic Air Command at Offutt Air Force Base, Nebraska, and he also served as director of the Joint Strategic Target Planning Staff. According to the Army Air Corps Museum, during his command SAC controlled more than 1,000 intercontinental ballistic missiles and 500 long-range jet bombers, which by 1971 accounted for 85 percent of American strategic nuclear strength. A SAC historical study recorded that in 1969 Holloway described the ICBM as the most important element of the strategic forces.

The command also supported the Vietnam War, as its B-52 bombers flew missions over Southeast Asia. Holloway was the only four-star general to check out in the SR-71. The actor and Air Force Reserve general James Stewart said that Holloway "has never forgotten the difference between machines and people". Holloway retired from the Air Force on April 30, 1972.

== Later life and death ==
After retiring, Holloway settled in Florida with his wife, Frances. The Gathering of Eagles Foundation honored him in 1999. He died at his home in Orlando, Florida, on September 30, 1999, survived by his wife, three daughters and four grandchildren.

== Awards and decorations ==
Holloway's decorations include:

=== Badges ===
US Air Force Command Pilot Badge
Parachutist Badge

=== Personal decorations ===
Air Force Distinguished Service Medal with bronze oak leaf cluster
Army Distinguished Service Medal
Silver Star
Legion of Merit with bronze oak leaf cluster
Distinguished Flying Cross with bronze oak leaf cluster
Air Medal with two bronze oak leaf clusters
Army Commendation Medal with bronze oak leaf cluster

=== Campaign and service medals ===
American Defense Service Medal
American Campaign Medal
Asiatic–Pacific Campaign Medal with two bronze campaign stars
World War II Victory Medal
National Defense Service Medal with bronze service star

=== Service, training, and marksmanship awards ===
Air Force Longevity Service Award with silver and two bronze oak leaf clusters

=== Foreign awards ===
Grand Official of the Order of Aeronautical Merit (Brazil)
Fifth Class of the Order of the Sacred Tripod (China)
Special Grand Cordon of the Order of the Cloud and Banner (China)
War Memorial Medal (China)
Commander of the Legion of Honour (France)
Grand Cross of the Order of Merit of the Federal Republic of Germany with star and sash (West Germany)
Knight Grand Cross of the Most Noble Order of the Crown of Thailand (Thailand)

=== Foreign badges ===
- Republic of China Air Force pilot wings
- German Air Force pilot wings
- Honorary Royal Thai Air Force Wings

The Air Force Aid Society later named a General Henry H. Arnold Education Grant in his honor. In 1986, the navigation award at SAC's annual bombing competition was renamed the Bruce K. Holloway Trophy, recognizing the top navigation score.

== Effective dates of promotion ==
Insignia	Rank	Date
	General	August 1, 1965
	Lieutenant general	October 6, 1961
	Major general	August 5, 1957
	Brigadier general	October 9, 1953
	Colonel	May 5, 1943
	Lieutenant colonel	December 6, 1942
	Major	March 4, 1942
	Captain	October 3, 1940
	First lieutenant	June 13, 1940
	Second lieutenant	June 12, 1937

== See also ==
- List of commanders of USAFE

Military offices
Preceded by Joseph J. Nazzaro	Commander-in-Chief, Strategic Air Command; 1968–1972	Succeeded by John C. Meyer
Preceded by William H. Blanchard	Vice Chief of Staff of the United States Air Force; 1966–1968	Succeeded by John Dale Ryan
