= John P. McConnell (general) =

Former Chief of Staff of the U.S. Air Force

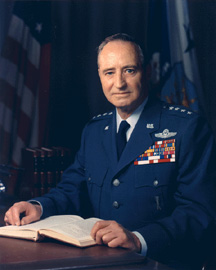
- General John Paul McConnell
- Born: February 7, 1908; Booneville, Arkansas, U.S.
- Died: November 21, 1986 (aged 78); Bethesda, Maryland, U.S.
- Burial place: United States Air Force Academy Cemetery
- Military career
- Allegiance: United States of America
- Branch: United States Army Air Corps United States Army Air Forces; United States Air Force
- Service years: 1928–1969
- Rank: General
- Commands: Chief of Staff of the United States Air Force; Second Air Force; Third Air Force; 7th Air Division
- Conflicts: World War II
- Awards: Air Force Distinguished Service Medal (2); Army Distinguished Service Medal (2); Legion of Merit (4); Distinguished Flying Cross; Bronze Star Medal; Air Medal

General John Paul McConnell (February 7, 1908 – November 21, 1986) was the sixth Chief of Staff of the United States Air Force. As chief of staff, McConnell served in a dual capacity. He was a member of the Joint Chiefs of Staff which, as a body, acts as the principal military adviser to the President of the United States, the National Security Council, and the Secretary of Defense. In his other capacity, he was responsible to the Secretary of the Air Force for managing the vast human and materiel resources of the world's most powerful aerospace force.

== Early life and education ==
John Paul McConnell was the son of Dr. Samuel Paul McConnell, a medical doctor, and Desseau M. (Dorsey) McConnell. A native of Booneville, Arkansas, McConnell graduated magna cum laude from Henderson Brown College at Arkadelphia, Arkansas, with a Bachelor of Science degree in 1927. He entered West Point a year later and, at the time of his graduation on June 10, 1932, was First Captain of the Corps of Cadets. After taking flying training at Randolph and Kelly Fields, Texas, he received his pilot wings in 1933.

== Military career ==
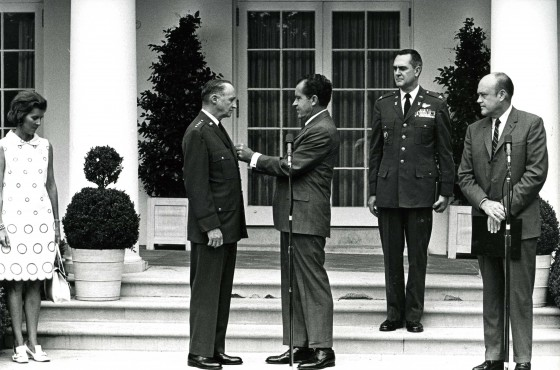
General John P. McConnell being presented with Air Force Distinguished Service Medal by President Richard Nixon at the White House on July 17, 1969.

A fighter pilot during his early years in the then-Army Air Corps, later Army Air Forces, McConnell gained broad experience through a variety of operational and administrative assignments, including duty as assistant executive in the Office of the Chief of Air Forces in Washington. Subsequently, he served in key Air Force positions in both Asia and Europe.

In 1943 McConnell became chief of staff of the China-Burma-India Air Force Training Command at Karachi, India (later part of Pakistan), and remained in Asia for the rest of World War II. While senior air staff officer, Air Command Southeast Asia, and deputy commander of the Third Tactical Air Force in 1944, he participated in combat operations against the Japanese in Burma. In 1946 he was named senior air adviser to the Chinese government and, at the same time, commanded the Air Division, Nanking Headquarters Command.

McConnell returned to Air Force Headquarters in Washington, D.C., in 1947 to become chief of the Reserve and National Guard Division and, the next year, was appointed chief of the Air Force's Civilian Components Group. Assigned to England in 1950, he served as deputy commander and later, commander of the Third Air Force. He then took command of the 7th Air Division of the Strategic Air Command, commanding the Third Air Force at the same time.

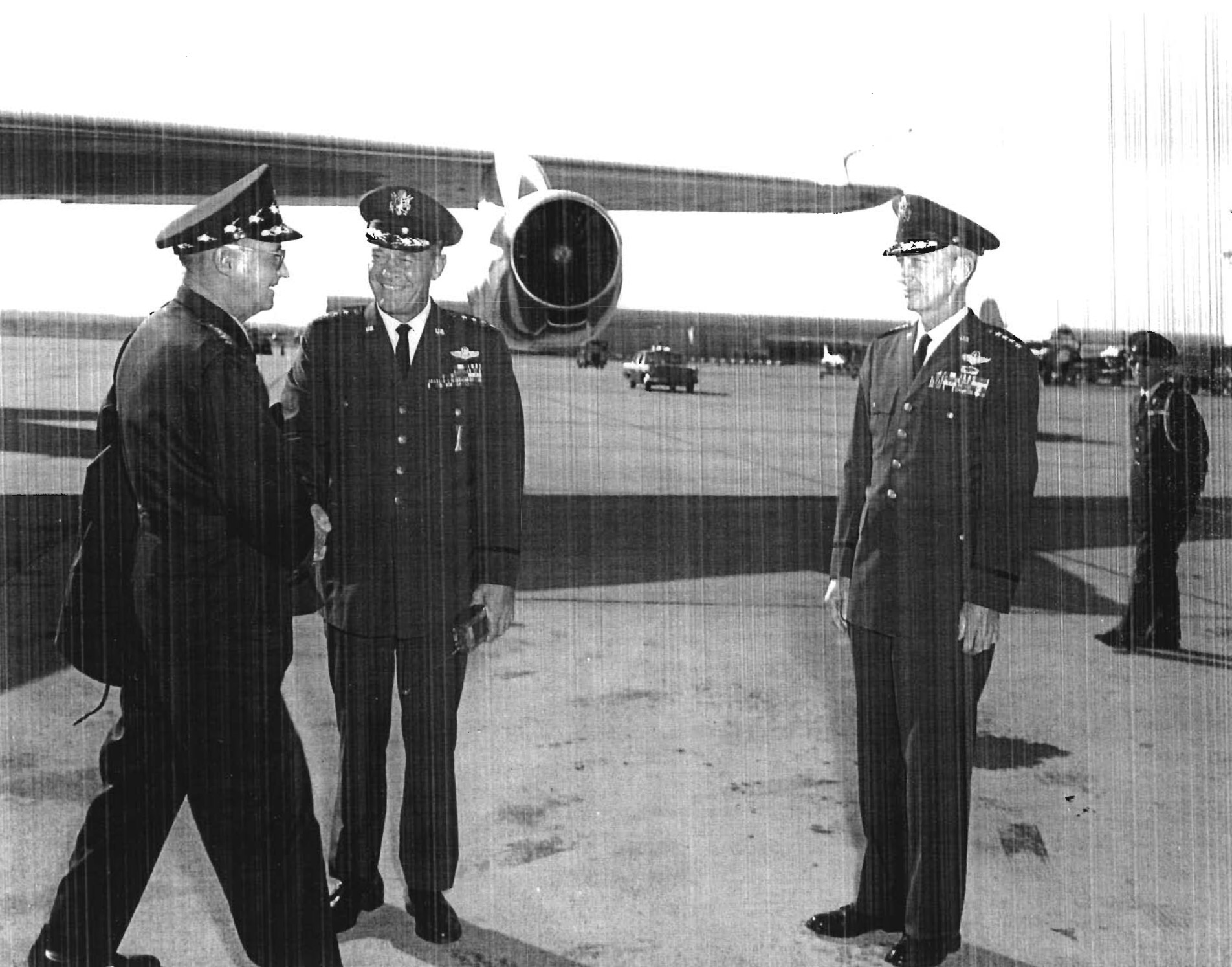
Air Force Chief of Staff General John P. McConnell greeted by Commanders of The Strategic Air Command General Joseph J. Nazzaro and Air Force Vice Chief of Staff General Bruce K. Holloway at Strategic Air Command's Headquarters in Offutt Air Force Base, Omaha, Nebraska, August 1, 1968.

This was followed by a four-year tour as director of Plans at Headquarters Strategic Air Command, Offutt Air Force Base, Nebraska. In 1957 he was named commander of Second Air Force, Barksdale Air Force Base, Louisiana, and four years later returned to Strategic Air Command to become vice commander in chief.

In 1962 McConnell was assigned to Europe as deputy commander in chief of the United States European Command and promoted to the rank of general. He was appointed Vice Chief of Staff of the United States Air Force in August 1964, and assumed the position of Chief of Staff of the United States Air Force on 1 February 1965, relieving General Curtis E. LeMay. His appointment as chief of staff was extended to July 1969.

McConnell's decorations included the Army Distinguished Service Medal with oak leaf cluster, Air Force Distinguished Service Medal with oak leaf cluster, Legion of Merit with three oak leaf clusters, Distinguished Flying Cross, Bronze Star Medal, Air Medal, and numerous foreign awards, including Commander of the Order of the British Empire and the Legion of Honor – Degree of Commandeur (France).

In June 1965, McConnell was presented an honorary doctor of laws degree from the University of Akron, Akron, Ohio. He also received an honorary doctor of laws degree from the University of Arkansas, Fayetteville in June 1966.

McConnell retired from the Air Force on July 31, 1969, and died November 21, 1986, in Bethesda, Montgomery County, Maryland. A funeral service was held on November 25 in the National Cathedral in Washington, D.C., with burial in the United States Air Force Academy Cemetery in Colorado Springs, Colorado on November 26.

The public library in his hometown of Booneville, Arkansas is named in his honor and contains many items of memorabilia from his years of service to the US Air Force, including service medals, decorations and commendations as of 2016.

=== Effective dates of promotion ===
Insignia	Rank	Date
	General	October 1, 1962
	Lieutenant general	June 30, 1959
	Major general	December 22, 1950
	Brigadier general	August 24, 1944
	Colonel	December 22, 1942
	Lieutenant colonel	January 23, 1942
	Major	July 15, 1941
	Captain	September 9, 1940
	First lieutenant	April 20, 1935
	Second lieutenant	June 10, 1932

== Postscript ==
McConnell's role as Chief of Staff of the Air Force, as well as that of the other members of the Joint Chiefs of Staff during the Vietnam War, specifically under the administration of President Lyndon B. Johnson and Secretary of Defense Robert McNamara, has recently been the subject of significant historical research in the area of the relationships between senior military leaders (e.g., the JCS) and the civilian political leadership (e.g., the National Command Authority) and has increasingly become a topical discussion issue and object lesson for officers attending the nation's senior service colleges (i.e., Air War College, Army War College, Naval War College and National War College).

The Arkansas Aviation Historical Society inducted McConnell into the Arkansas Aviation Hall of Fame in 1985.

McConnell's son, Dorsey W. M. McConnell, is the Acting Bishop of Aberdeen and Orkney in the Scottish Episcopal Church. He had served as bishop diocesan in the Episcopal Diocese of Pittsburgh from 2012 to 2021. Another son, Bruce W. McConnell, was CEO and President at the EastWest Institute.

== Awards and honors ==
McConnell's decorations include:

=== Badges ===
US Air Force Command Pilot Badge

=== Personal decorations ===
Air Force Distinguished Service Medal with bronze oak leaf cluster
Army Distinguished Service Medal with bronze oak leaf cluster
Legion of Merit with three bronze oak leaf clusters
Distinguished Flying Cross
Bronze Star Medal
Air Medal

=== Campaign and service medals ===
American Defense Service Medal
American Campaign Medal
Asiatic–Pacific Campaign Medal with two four campaign stars
World War II Victory Medal
National Defense Service Medal with bronze service star

=== Service, training, and marksmanship awards ===
Air Force Longevity Service Award with silver and two bronze oak leaf clusters

=== Foreign awards ===
Special Grand Cordon (Collar) of the Order of the Sacred Tripod (China)
Grand Cordon of the Order of the Sacred Tripod (China)
Grand Cordon of the Order of the Cloud and Banner (China)
Order of the Cloud and Banner with ribbon (China)
Order of Luoshu (China)
War Memorial Medal (China)
Commander of the Legion of Honour (France)
Commander of the Order of the British Empire (United Kingdom)

=== Foreign badges ===
- Republic of China Air Force pilot wings

== See also ==
- Johnson-McConnell agreement of 1966

Military offices
Preceded by Gen. Curtis E. LeMay	Chief of Staff of the United States Air Force; 1965–1969	Succeeded by Gen. John Dale Ryan
