= General McMullen =

General McMullen may refer to:

- Brett James McMullen (fl. 1980s–2010s), U.S. Air Force brigadier general
- Clements McMullen (1892–1959), U.S. Air Force major general
- Donald McMullen (1891–1967), British Army major general
- Norman MacMullen (1877–1944), British Indian Army general
