= Leo Smith =

Leo Smith may refer to:

- F. Leo Smith (1903-1999), American state legislator and district attorney
- Leo Smith (baseball) (1859–1935), American baseball player
- Leo Smith (composer) (1881–1952), English composer active in Canada
- Leo Smith (sculptor) (born 1947), American sculptor
- Leo Richard Smith (1905–1963), American prelate of the Roman Catholic Church
- Wadada Leo Smith (born 1941), American avant-garde jazz trumpeter and composer
- Leo Smith (hurler), Irish hurler
- Leo W. Smith II, United States Air Force general

== See also ==
- Leo Smit (disambiguation)
