= James Keck =

James Keck may refer to:

- James C. Keck (1924–2010), American physicist and engineer
- James M. Keck (1921–2018), U.S. Air Force general
