= George Kenney =

United States Army Air Forces general

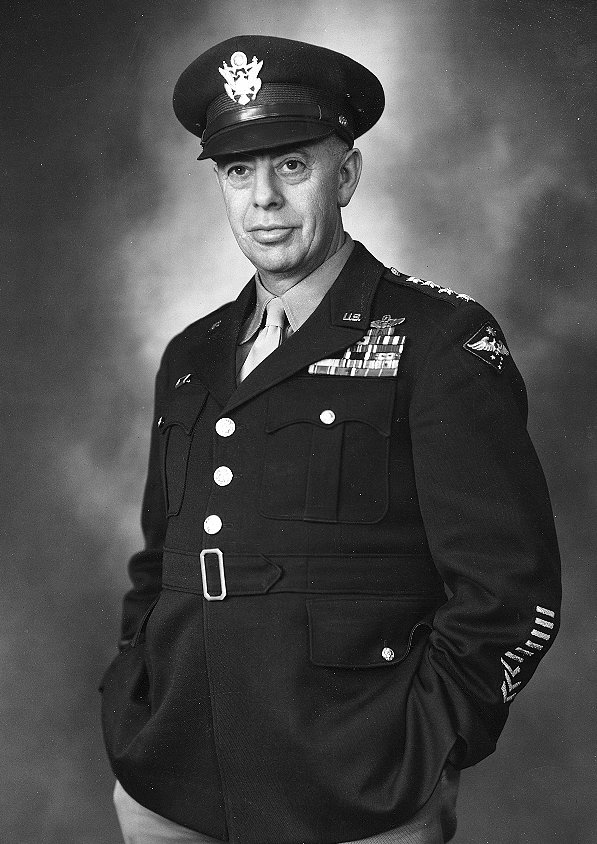
- General George C. Kenney
- Born: George Churchill Kenney; 6 August 1889; Yarmouth, Nova Scotia, Canada
- Died: 9 August 1977 (aged 88); Bay Harbor Islands, Florida, U.S.
- Burial place: Caballero Rivero Woodlawn Park North Cemetery and Mausoleum, Miami, Florida, U.S.
- Military career
- Allegiance: United States of America
- Branch: United States Army; Army Air Service; Army Air Corps; Army Air Forces; United States Air Force
- Service years: 1917–1947 (Army); 1947–1951 (Air Force)
- Rank: General
- Service number: 0–8940
- Commands: Air University; Strategic Air Command; Far East Air Forces; Fifth Air Force
- Conflicts: World War I; Battle of Saint-Mihiel; Meuse–Argonne offensive; Occupation of the Rhineland; World War II; New Guinea campaign; Philippines campaign (1944–45); Borneo campaign (1945); Air raids on Japan; Occupation of Japan
- Awards: Distinguished Service Cross (2); Distinguished Service Medal (3); Silver Star; Legion of Merit; Distinguished Flying Cross; Purple Heart; Knight Commander of the Order of the British Empire (Australia)

George Churchill Kenney (6 August 1889 – 9 August 1977) was a United States Army general during World War II. He is best known as the commander of the Allied Air Forces in the Southwest Pacific Area (SWPA), a position he held between August 1942 and 1945.

Kenney enlisted as a flying cadet in the Aviation Section, U.S. Signal Corps in 1917, and served on the Western Front with the 91st Aero Squadron. He was awarded a Silver Star and the Distinguished Service Cross for actions in which he fought off German fighters and shot two down. After hostilities ended he participated in the Occupation of the Rhineland. Returning to the United States, he flew reconnaissance missions along the border between the US and Mexico during the Mexican Revolution. Commissioned into the Regular Army in 1920, he attended the Air Corps Tactical School, and later became an instructor there. He was responsible for the acceptance of Martin NBS-1 bombers built by Curtis, and test flew them. He also developed techniques for mounting .30 caliber machine guns on the wings of an Airco DH.4 aircraft.

In early 1940, Kenney became Assistant Military Attaché for Air in France. As a result of his observations of German and Allied air operations during the early stages of World War II, he recommended significant changes to Air Corps equipment and tactics. In July 1942, he assumed command of the Allied Air Forces and Fifth Air Force in General Douglas MacArthur's Southwest Pacific Area. Under Kenney's command, the Allied Air Forces developed innovative command structures, weapons, and tactics that reflected Kenney's orientation towards attack aviation. The new weapons and tactics won perhaps his greatest victory, the Battle of the Bismarck Sea, in March 1943. Two other significant bombing raids that ultimately led to complete air supremacy in the New Guinea campaign, at Wewak (174 planes destroyed) in August 1943 and at Hollandia (400 planes destroyed) in March to April 1944, also were due to Kenney and his command. In June 1944 he was appointed commander of the Far East Air Forces (FEAF), which came to include the Fifth, Thirteenth, and Seventh Air Forces.

In April 1946, Kenney became the first commander of the newly formed Strategic Air Command (SAC), but his performance in the role was criticized, and he was shifted to become commander of the Air University, a position he held from October 1948 until his retirement from the Air Force in September 1951.

== Early life ==
George Churchill Kenney was born in Yarmouth, Nova Scotia, Canada, on 6 August 1889, during a summer vacation taken by his parents to avoid the humidity of the Boston area. The oldest of four children of carpenter Joseph Atwood Kenney and his wife Anne Louise Kenney, née Churchill, Kenney grew up in Brookline, Massachusetts. He graduated from Brookline High School in 1907 and later that year he entered the Massachusetts Institute of Technology (MIT), where he pursued a course in civil engineering. After his father left his family, Kenney quit MIT and took various jobs before becoming a surveyor for the Quebec Saguenay Railroad.

His mother died in 1913 and Kenney returned to Boston, where he took a job with Stone & Webster. In 1914, he joined the New York, New Haven and Hartford Railroad as a civil engineer, building a bridge in New London, Connecticut. After this was completed, he formed a partnership, the Beaver Contracting and Engineering Corporation, with a high school classmate, Gordon Glazier. The firm became involved in a number of projects, including the construction of a seawall at Winthrop, Massachusetts, and a bridge over the Squannacook River.

== World War I ==
The United States entered World War I in April 1917, and Kenney enlisted as a flying cadet in the Aviation Section, U.S. Signal Corps on 2 June 1917. He attended ground school at MIT in June and July, and received primary flight training at Hazelhurst Field in Mineola, New York, from Bert Acosta. He was commissioned as a first lieutenant on 5 November 1917, and departed for France soon after. There, he received further flight training at Issoudun. This ended in February 1918, when he was assigned to the 91st Aero Squadron.

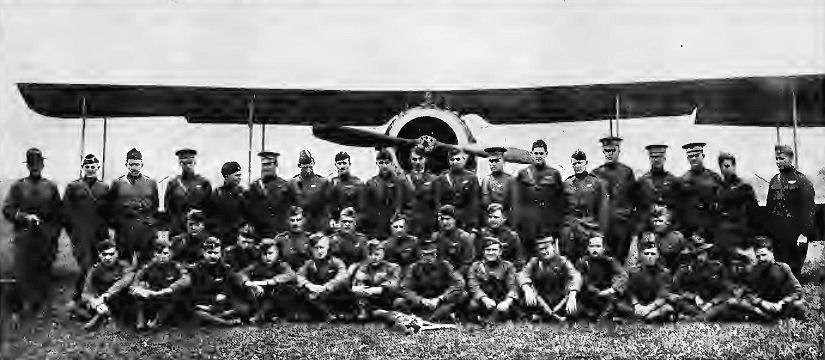
Kenney is 2nd from right top row.

The 91st Aero Squadron flew the Salmson 2A2, a reconnaissance biplane. Kenney crashed one on takeoff on 22 March 1918. He broke an ankle and a hand, and earned himself the nickname "Bust 'em up George". His injuries soon healed, and he recorded his first mission on 3 June. Kenney flew one of four aircraft on a mission near Gorze on 15 September 1918, that was attacked by six German Pfalz D.III scouts. His observer William T. Badham shot one of them down, and Kenney was credited with his first aerial victory. For this he was awarded a Silver Star. A second victory followed in similar circumstances on 9 October while he was flying near Jametz in support of the Meuse-Argonne Offensive. Once again, the formation he was flying with was attacked by German fighters. This time he was awarded the Distinguished Service Cross, which was presented by Brigadier General Billy Mitchell on 10 January 1919.

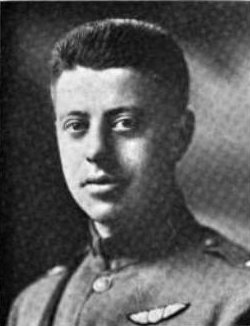
Captain George Kenney in c. 1920

Kenney's citation read:

For extraordinary heroism in action near Jametz, France, 9 October 1918. This officer gave proof of his bravery and devotion to duty when he was attacked by a superior number of aircraft. He accepted combat, destroyed one plane and drove the others off. Notwithstanding that the enemy returned and attacked again in strong numbers, he continued his mission and enabled his observer to secure information of great military value.

Kenney remained for a time with the Allied occupation forces in Germany, and was promoted to captain on 18 March 1919. He returned to the United States in June 1919. He was the co-author in 1919 of "History of the 91st Aero Squadron" He was sent to Kelly Field, near San Antonio, Texas, and then to McAllen, Texas. As commander of the 8th Aero Squadron, he flew reconnaissance missions along the border with Mexico during the Mexican Revolution. Poor aircraft maintenance, rough landing strips and bad weather led to the squadron losing 22 of its 24 Airco DH.4 aircraft in just one year.

== Between the wars ==
Kenney applied for one of a number of Regular Army commissions offered to reservists after the war, and was commissioned as a captain in the Air Service on 1 July 1920. While he was in hospital in Texas recovering from an aviation accident, he met a nurse, Helen "Hazel" Dell Richardson, the daughter of a Mobile, Alabama, contractor, George W. Richardson. They were married in Mobile on 6 October 1920. Hazel miscarried twins, and was warned by her doctor of the danger of another pregnancy, but she strongly wished to have a child. In 1922, while the couple was living on Long Island, New York, a son, William Richardson Kenney, was born to them, but Hazel died soon afterward from complications. Kenney arranged to have the infant cared for by his neighbor, Alice Steward Maxey, another nurse. On 5 June 1923, Kenney married Maxey in her home town of Gardiner, Maine.

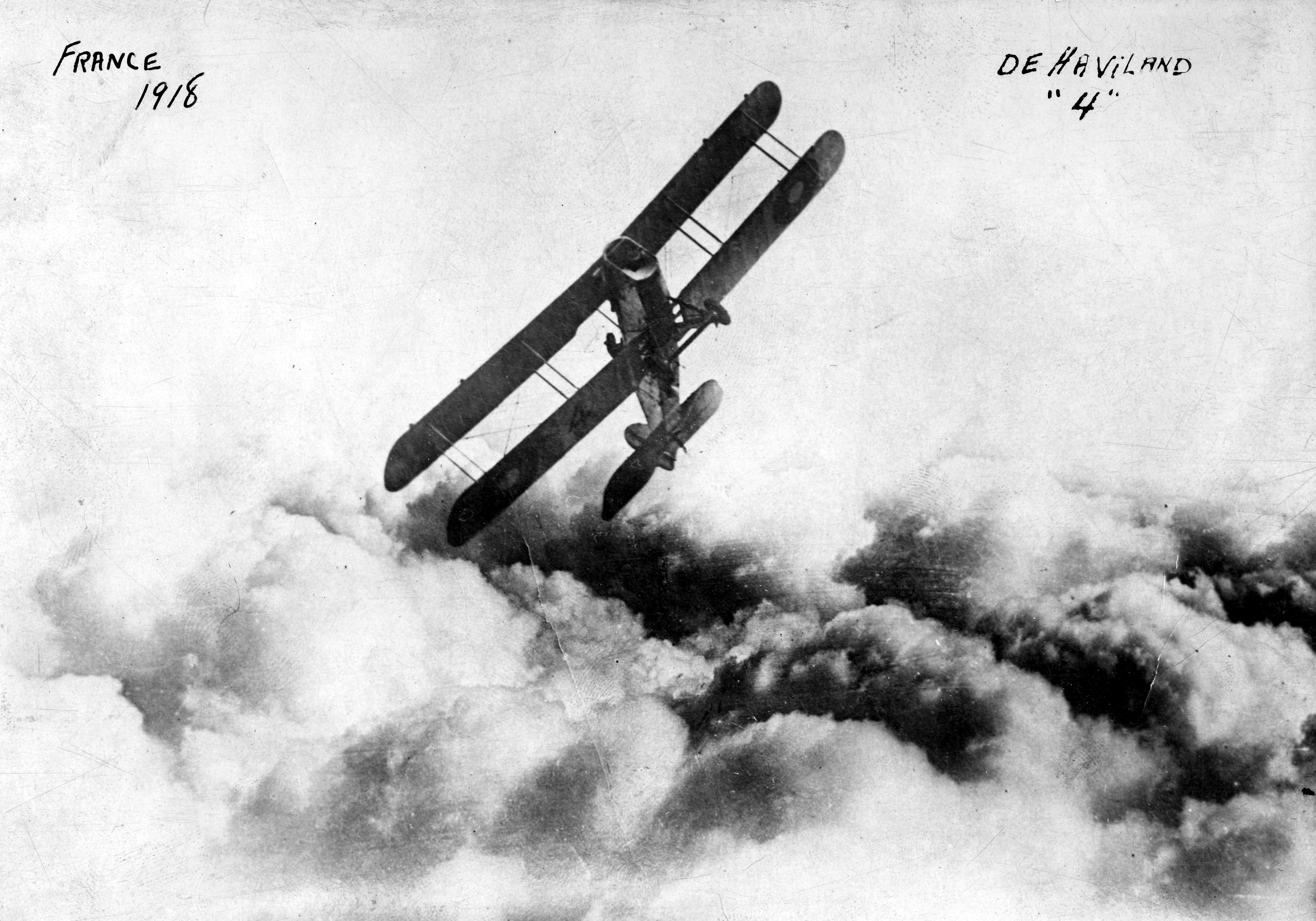
DH.4 above the clouds in France. Kenney flew this aircraft in Texas, and later developed techniques for mounting machine guns on the wings

From July to November 1920, Kenney was air detachment commander at Camp Knox, Kentucky. He then became a student at the Air Service Engineering School at McCook Field, near Dayton Ohio. He was the Air Service Inspector at the Curtiss Aeroplane and Motor Company in Garden City, New York, where he was responsible for the acceptance of the fifty Martin NBS-1 bombers that the Air Service had ordered from Curtis between 1921 and 1923. Kenney inspected the aircraft, and test flew them. While there, he was reduced in rank from captain to first lieutenant on 18 November 1922, a common occurrence in the aftermath of World War I when the wartime army was demobilized. He returned to McCook in 1923, and developed techniques for mounting .30 caliber machine guns on the wings of a DH.4. He was promoted to captain again on 3 November 1923. His daughter, Julia Churchill Kenney, was born in Dayton in June 1926.

In 1926, Kenney became a student at the Air Corps Tactical School, at Langley Field, Virginia, the Air Corps' advanced training school. He then attended the Command and General Staff School at Fort Leavenworth, Kansas, the Army's advanced school where officers were taught how to handle large formations as commanders or staff officers. Most Air Corps officers, including Kenney, considered the course largely irrelevant to them, and therefore a waste of time, but nonetheless a prerequisite for promotion in a ground-oriented Army. Afterwards, he returned to the Air Corps Tactical School as an instructor. He taught classes of attack aviation. He was particularly interested in low-level attacks, as a means of improving accuracy. There were tactical problems with this, as low-flying aircraft were vulnerable to ground fire. There were also technical problems to be solved, as an aircraft could be struck by its own bomb fragments. His interest in attack aviation would ultimately set him apart in an Air Corps where strategic bombardment came to dominate thinking.

Kenney reached the pinnacle of his professional education in September 1932, when he entered the Army War College in Washington, D.C. At the war college, committees of students studied a number of World War I battles; Kenney's committee examined the Second Battle of the Masurian Lakes. They updated actual war plans, Kenney's study group working on War Plan Orange. They also had to write an individual paper; Kenney wrote his on "The Proper Composition of the Air Force". One benefit of the Army War College was that it brought Air Corps officers into contact with ground officers that they would later have to work closely with. Members of Kenney's class included Richard Sutherland and Stephen Chamberlain, both of whom worked with him on committees.

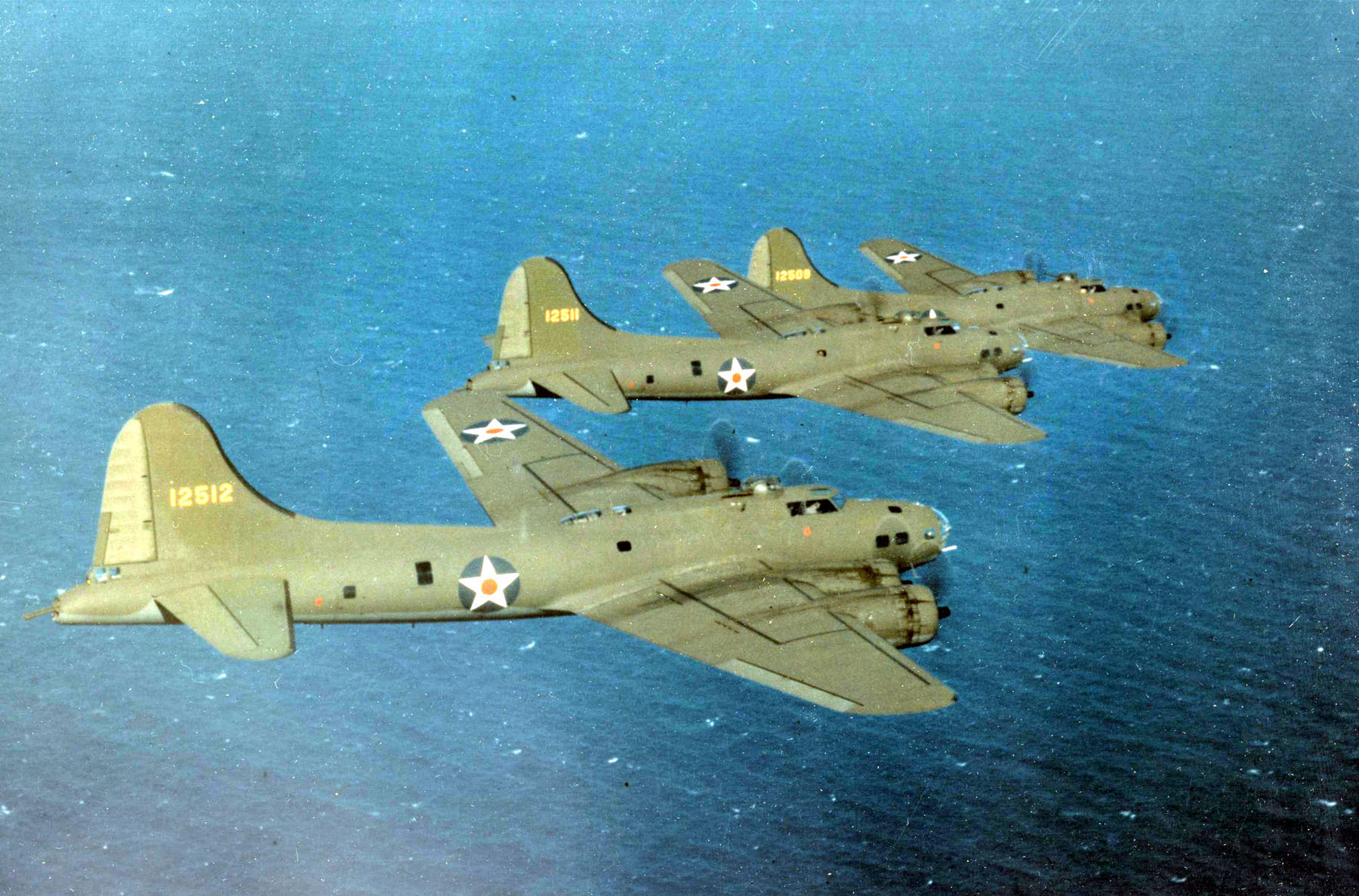
Kenney was a proponent of close air support, and did not want the US to focus so strongly on strategic bombing, as represented by the Boeing B-17 Flying Fortress

Graduation from the Army War College was normally followed by a staff posting, and on graduation in June 1933 Kenney became an assistant to Major James E. Chaney in the Plans Division of the Office of the Chief of the Air Corps, Major General Benjamin Foulois. He performed various duties, including translating an article by the Italian air power theorist Giulio Douhet into English. In 1934, he was involved with drafting legislation that granted the Air Corps a greater degree of independence. This legislation prompted the Army to create GHQ Air Force, a centralized, air force-level command headed by an aviator answering directly to the Army Chief of Staff. Lieutenant Colonel Frank M. Andrews was chosen to command it, and selected Kenney as his Assistant Chief of Staff for Plans and Training.

In this role, Kenney was promoted to the temporary rank of lieutenant colonel on 2 March 1935, skipping that of major. He became involved in an acrimonious debate with the Army General Staff over the Air Corps' desire to purchase more Boeing B-17 Flying Fortress bombers. He also became caught up in a bureaucratic battle between Andrews and Major General Oscar Westover over whether the Chief of the Air Corps should control GHQ Air Force. As a result, Kenney was transferred to the Infantry School at Fort Benning, Georgia, on 16 June 1936, with the temporary rank of major, to teach tactics to young infantry officers. He was promoted to the substantive rank of major on 1 October 1937, but the assignment was hardly a choice one for an Air Corps officer. In September 1938 he accepted an offer to command the 97th Observation Squadron at Mitchell Field, New York.

== World War II ==
In 1939, Kenney was made Chief of the Production Engineering Section at Wright Field, Ohio. He was sent to France in early 1940, once again with the temporary rank of lieutenant colonel, as Assistant Military Attaché for Air. His mission was to observe Allied air operations during the early stages of World War II. As a result of his observations, he recommended many important changes to Air Corps equipment and tactics, including upgrading armament from .30 caliber to .50 caliber machine guns, and installing leak-proof fuel tanks, but his scathing comparisons of the German Luftwaffe with the Air Corps upset many officers. This resulted in his being sent back to Wright Field. In January 1941, he became commander of the Air Corps Experimental Depot and Engineering School there, with the rank of brigadier general. He was promoted to major general on 26 March 1942, when he became commander of the Fourth Air Force, an air defense and training organization based in San Francisco. Kenney personally instructed pilots on how to handle the Lockheed P-38 Lightning and A-29 Hudson.

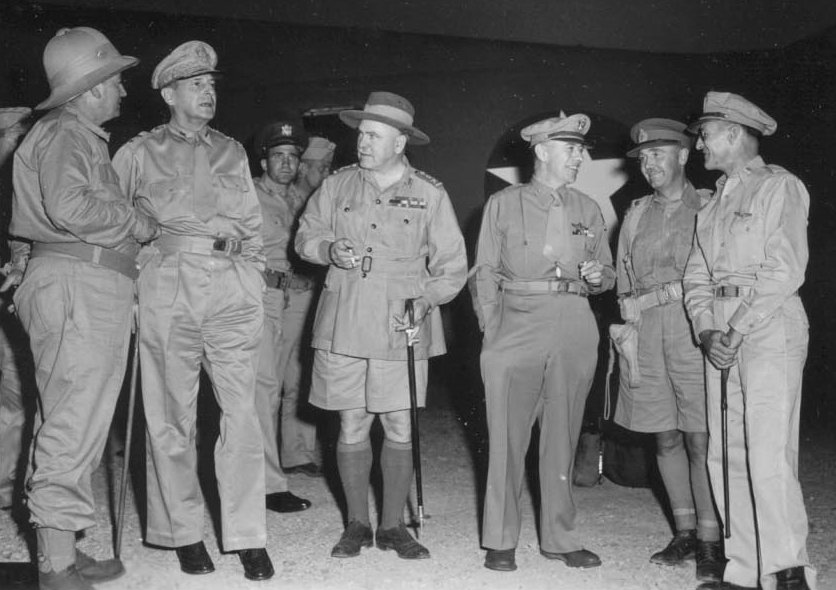
Senior Allied commanders in New Guinea in October 1942. Left to right: Mr. Frank Forde; General Douglas MacArthur; General Sir Thomas Blamey; Lieutenant General George Kenney; Lieutenant General Edmund Herring; Brigadier General Kenneth Walker

=== Southwest Pacific Area ===
In July 1942, Kenney received orders to take over the Allied Air Forces and Fifth Air Force in General Douglas MacArthur's Southwest Pacific Area. MacArthur had been dissatisfied with the performance of his air commander, Lieutenant General George Brett.

Frank M. Andrews, by then a major general, turned down the job, and MacArthur, offered a choice between Kenney and Major General James Doolittle, chose Kenney. Kenney reported to MacArthur in Brisbane on 28 July 1942, and was treated to "a lecture for approximately an hour on the shortcomings of the Air Force in general, and the Allied Air Forces in the Southwest Pacific in particular." Kenney felt that MacArthur did not understand air operations, but recognized that he somehow needed to establish a good working relationship with him. When he asked MacArthur for authority to send people he considered "deadwood" home, something that his superiors in Washington, D.C. had refused to give, MacArthur enthusiastically approved.

Building a good relationship with MacArthur meant getting past MacArthur's chief of staff, Lieutenant General Richard Kerens Sutherland. Brett advised Kenney that "a showdown early in the game with Sutherland might clarify the entire atmosphere." Sutherland, who had a civil pilot's license, had taken to issuing detailed instructions to the Allied Air Forces. This was more than simply a turf battle; to many airmen, it was a part of the ongoing battle for an independent air force that they had long been advocating. At one point, Kenney drew a dot on a plain page of paper and told Sutherland, "the dot represents what you know about air operations, the entire rest of the paper what I know." Sutherland backed down, and would henceforth let Kenney run the Allied Air Forces without interference. It did not follow, however, that MacArthur would invariably accept Kenney's advice.

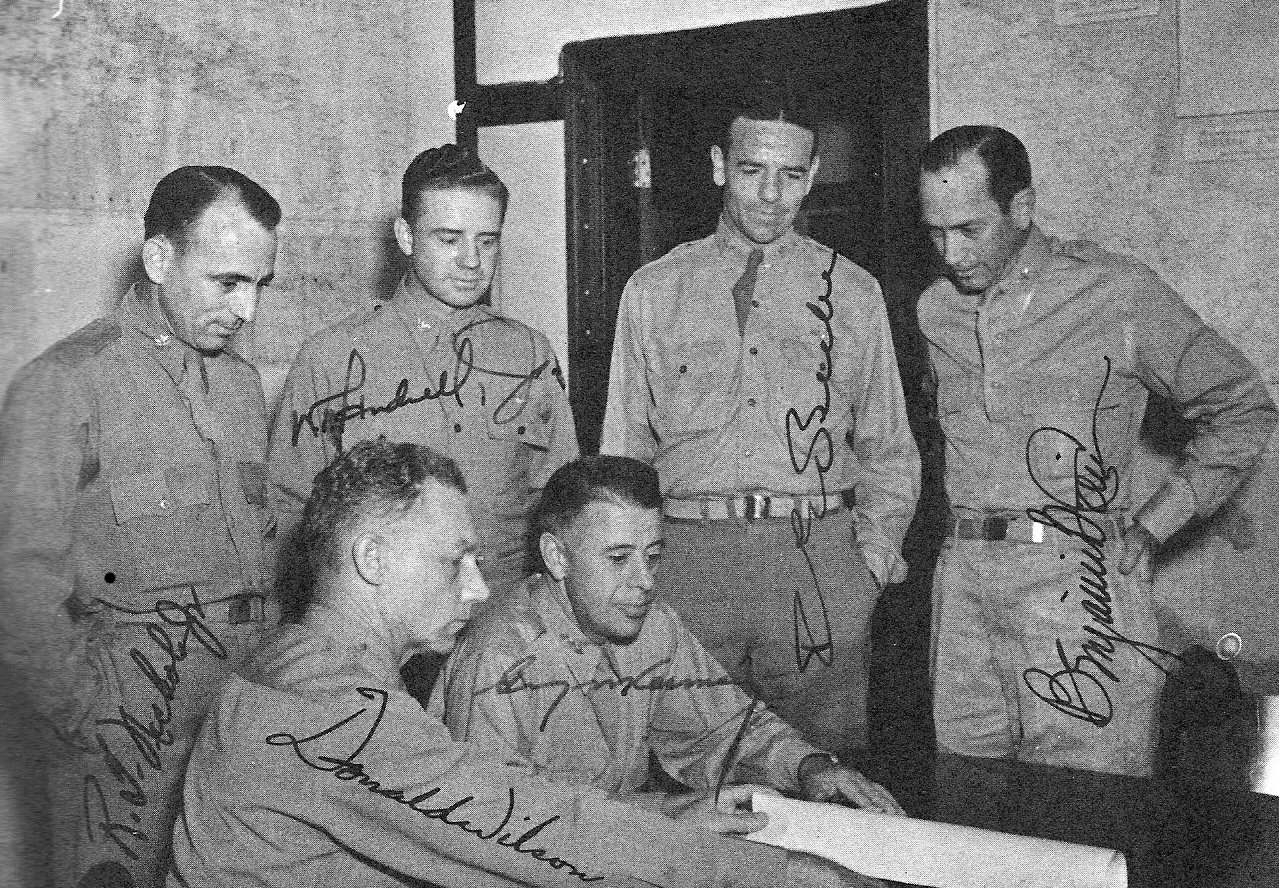
Kenney (center) surrounded by his staff

Kenney sent home Major General Ralph Royce, Brigadier Generals Edwin S. Perrin, Albert Sneed and Martin Scanlon, and about forty colonels. In Australia, he found two talented, recently arrived brigadier generals, Ennis Whitehead and Kenneth Walker. Kenney reorganized his command in August, appointed Whitehead as commander of the V Fighter Command and Walker as commander of the V Bomber Command. The Allied Air Forces was composed of both United States Army Air Forces (USAAF) and Royal Australian Air Force (RAAF) personnel. Kenney moved to separate them. Brigadier General Donald Wilson arrived in September and replaced Air Vice Marshal William Bostock as Kenney's chief of staff. Bostock took over the newly created RAAF Command.

This brought Kenney into conflict with the Chief of the Air Staff of the RAAF, Air Vice Marshal George Jones, who felt that an opportunity had been lost to simplify the administration of the RAAF. Kenney preferred to have Bostock in command, and while he regarded the antipathy between Jones and Bostock as a nuisance, was happy to leave arrangements the way they were. However, Kenney deviated from the normal structure of an air force by creating the Advanced Echelon (ADVON) under Whitehead. The new headquarters had the authority to change the assignments of aircraft in the forward area, where fast-changing weather and enemy action could overtake orders drawn up in Australia. Kenney was promoted to lieutenant general on 21 October 1942.

Perhaps because of his experience in World War I, Kenney had a great deal of respect for Japanese fighters. He decided to conserve his bombers, and concentrate on attaining air superiority over New Guinea. Kenney switched the bombers to attacking by night unless fighter escorts could be provided. SWPA had a low priority, and simply could not afford to replace losses from costly daylight missions. What he needed was an effective long-range fighter, and Kenney hoped that the Lockheed P-38 Lightning would fit the bill, but the first ones delivered to SWPA were plagued with technical problems. Kenney had Charles Lindbergh teach his P-38 pilots how to extend the range of their aircraft.

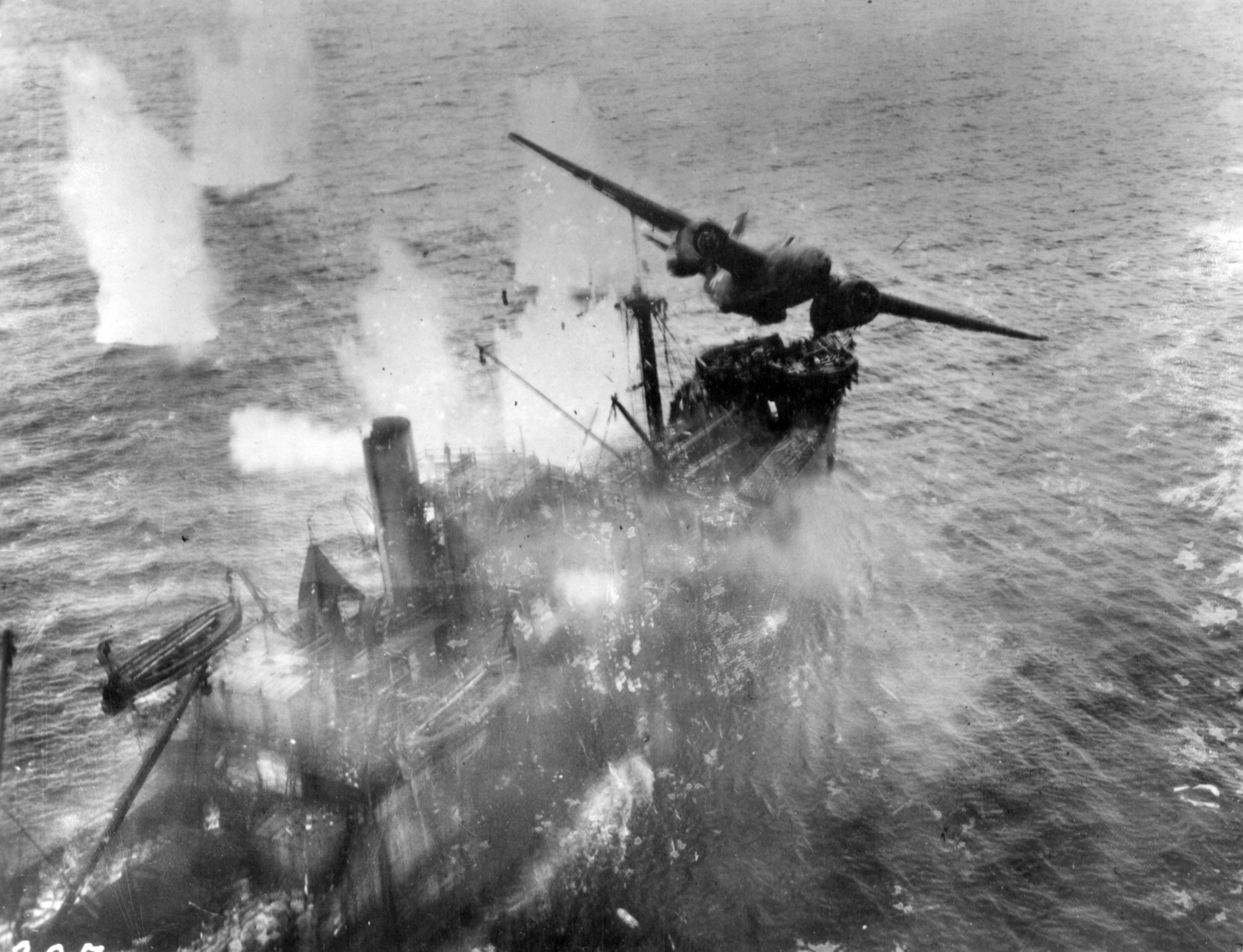
U.S. A-20 Havoc of the 89th Squadron, 3rd Attack Group, at the moment it clears a Japanese merchant ship following a successful skip bombing attack. Wewak, New Guinea, March 1944

The Southwest Pacific was not a promising theater of war for the strategic bomber. The bombers of the day did not have the range to reach Japan from Australia, and there were no typical strategic targets in the theater other than a few oil refineries. This set up a doctrinal clash between Kenney, an attack aviator, and Walker, the bomber advocate. The long-standing Air Corps tactic for attacking shipping called for large formations of high-altitude bombers. With sufficient mass, so the theory went, bombers could bracket any ship with walls of bombs, and do so from above the effective range of the ship's anti-aircraft fire. However the theoretical mass required was two orders of magnitude greater than what was available in the Southwest Pacific. A dozen or so bombers was the most that could be put together, owing to the small number of aircraft in the theater and the difficulties of keeping them serviceable. The results were therefore generally ineffective, and operations incurred heavy casualties.

Walker resisted Kenney's proposals that the bombers conduct attacks from low level using bombs armed with instantaneous fuses. Kenney ordered Walker to try the fuses for a couple of months, so that data could be gained about their effectiveness; a few weeks later Kenney discovered that Walker had discontinued their use. In November, Kenney arranged for a demonstration attack on the SS Pruth, a ship that had sunk off Port Moresby in 1924 and was often used for target practice. After the attack Walker and Kenney took a boat out to the wreck to inspect the damage. As expected, none of the four bombs dropped had hit the stationary wreck, but the instantaneous fuses had detonated the bombs when they struck the water, so bomb fragments had torn holes in the sides of the ship. Walker reluctantly conceded the point. A few weeks later, Walker was shot down leading a daylight raid over Rabaul, an attack that Kenney had ordered to be conducted at night.

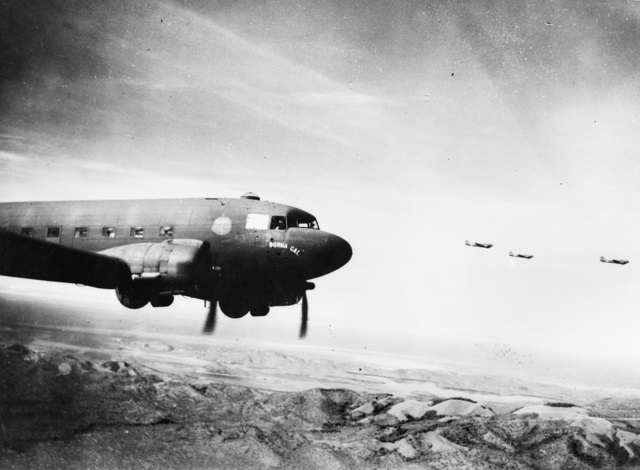
Dakotas fly across the mountains towards Wau

In addition to trying different types of ordnance, the Allied Air Forces experimented with modifications to the aircraft themselves. Major Paul I. "Pappy" Gunn modified some USAAF Douglas A-20 Havoc light bombers by installing four .50 in (12.7 mm) machine guns in their noses, and two 450-US-gallon (1,700 L; 370 imp gal) fuel tanks were added to give the aircraft more range. This was successful, and an attempt was then made to create a longer range attack aircraft by doing the same thing to a B-25 Mitchell medium bomber, to operate as a "commerce destroyer". This proved to be somewhat more difficult. The resulting aircraft was obviously nose heavy despite adding lead ballast to the tail, and the vibrations caused by firing the machine guns were enough to make rivets pop out of the skin of the aircraft. The tail guns and belly turrets were removed, the latter being of little use if the aircraft was flying low.

The Allied Air Forces also adopted innovative tactics. In February 1942, the RAAF began experimenting with skip bombing, an anti-shipping technique used by the British and Germans. Flying only a few dozen feet above the sea toward their targets, aircraft would release their bombs, which would then, ideally, ricochet across the surface of the water and explode at the side of the target ship, under it, or just over it. A similar technique was mast-height bombing, in which bombers would approach the target at low altitude, 200 to 500 feet (61 to 152 m), at about 265 to 275 miles per hour (426 to 443 km/h), and then drop down to mast height, 10 to 15 feet (3.0 to 4.6 m) about 600 yards (550 m) from the target. They would release their bombs at around 300 yards (270 m), aiming directly at the side of the ship. The two techniques were not mutually exclusive. A bomber could drop two bombs, skipping the first and launching the second at mast height. The Battle of the Bismarck Sea demonstrated the effectiveness of low-level attacks on shipping.

Another form of airpower employed by Kenney was air transport. This started in September 1942 when troops of the 32nd Infantry Division were airlifted from Australia to Port Moresby. Later in the campaign, C-47 Dakotas landed Australian troops at Wanigela. A year later, American paratroops landed at Nadzab, enabling the Australian 7th Division to be flown in.

The ultimate challenge was to integrate air power with MacArthur's strategy. Kenney described the process this way in 1944:

The first step in this advancement of the bomber line is to gain and maintain air control as far into enemy territory as our longest range fighters can reach. Then we put an air blockade around the Jap positions or section of the coast which we want in order to stop him from getting supplies or reinforcements. The bombers then go to work and pulverize his defensive system, methodically taking out artillery positions, stores, bivouac areas and so on. Finally comes the air cover escorting the amphibious expedition to the landing beach, a last minute blasting and smoking of the enemy beach defenses and the maintenance of strafers and fighters overhead, on call from the surface forces until their beachhead is secured. If emergency supplies are needed we drop them by parachute. The ground troops get a transport field ready as fast as possible so that we can supplement boat supply by cargo carrying airplanes. When necessary, we evacuate the wounded and sick and bring in reinforcements in a hurry. The transport field becomes a fighter field, the strafers and finally the heavies arrive and it is time to move forward again.

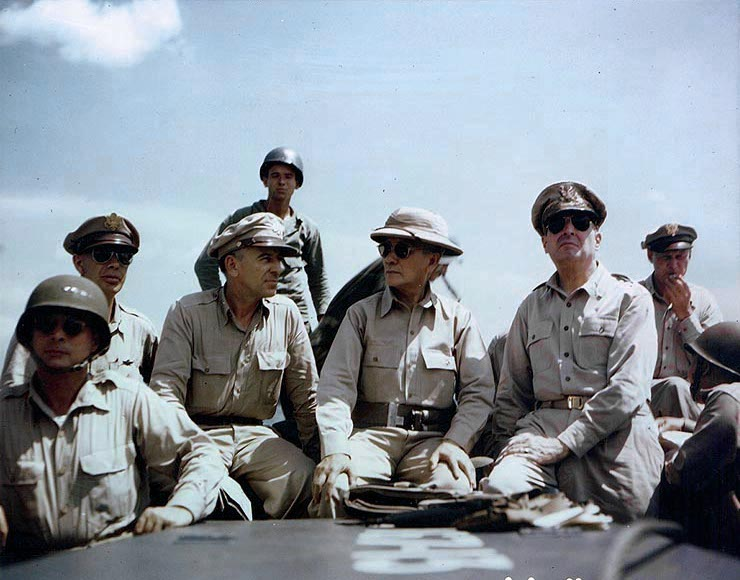
Kenney (left, with sunglasses), Richard Sutherland, Sergio Osmeña and Douglas MacArthur off Leyte, October 1944.

=== Far East Air Forces ===
In June 1944, Kenney was appointed commander of the Far East Air Forces (FEAF), which came to include the Fifth, Thirteenth, and Seventh Air Forces. He created the 1st, 2nd and 3rd Air Task Forces to control air operations in forward areas, each for a specific mission, another departure from doctrine. While Kenney was enthusiastic about this innovation, Washington did not like it and, over Kenney's objections, converted the three air task forces into the 308th, 309th and 310th Bombardment Wings. He was promoted to general on 9 March 1945.

Kenney hoped to get Boeing B-29 Superfortresses assigned to the Far East Air Forces so that, based from airfields near Darwin, they could destroy the Japanese oilfields at Balikpapan. His agitation for the B-29s did not endear him to the USAAF staff in Washington, D.C. Instead, B-24 Liberators were used in a strike from Darwin in August 1943 by the American 380th Bombardment Group assigned to the Royal Australian Air Force. Another series of five air raids were launched by B-24s of the 5th and Thirteenth Air Forces from Noemfoor Island. The Japanese had been conserving their fighter forces to protect the oil fields and the first two raids, which did not have fighter cover, suffered severe losses. After the war, the Strategic Bombing Survey concluded that this would have been far more productive than Operation Matterhorn, which saw B-29s based in China to bomb steel plants in Japan, as oil was more critical to the Japanese war effort than steel.

== Post-war career ==
In April 1946, Kenney became the first commander of the newly formed Strategic Air Command (SAC). He was encouraged by Secretary of the Air Force Stuart Symington to join him in the political battle surrounding the establishment of an independent United States Air Force. Separately, the two men gave promotional speeches around the country. As a result, SAC's efficiency suffered. On 8 May 1946, Kenney publicly presented the Medal of Honor to the family of Thomas B. McGuire Jr., the second-highest scoring US fighter pilot, who had been killed in action.

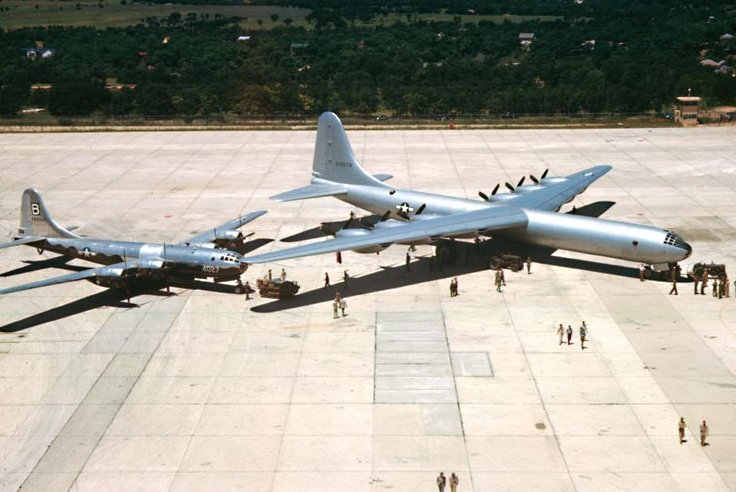
The huge new Convair B-36 Peacemaker (right) alongside the Boeing B-29 Superfortress.

Kenney left day-to-day operations at SAC in the hands of his deputy commander, Major General St. Clair Streett. Part of the reason for Kenney's lack of focus on SAC was also his assignment as U.S. representative to the United Nations Military Staff Committee, which appeared at that time to be potentially an important assignment. In January 1947, Streett was replaced by Major General Clements McMullen. With McMullen serving officially as Kenney's deputy but actually in command, a cross-training program was implemented in early 1948 to teach bomber crew members each other's tasks, the goal being to reduce each bomber's contingent of officers from five to three. Morale suffered as a result. Major General Lauris Norstad, responsible for reporting the readiness of American airpower to the U.S. Secretary of Defense, James Forrestal, heard from unhappy airmen that SAC was in a poor state of readiness, and he initiated an investigation. He selected Charles Lindbergh and Paul Tibbets to perform the inquiry. Tibbets told Norstad that he found nobody at SAC knew their job. Lindbergh said that McMullen's cross-training program "seriously interfered with training the primary mission."

On 6 May 1948, Kenney spoke to a crowd in Bangor, Maine, telling them that the US was likely to be attacked by the Soviet Union as soon as the latter had enough atomic bombs. In Washington, D.C., a group of senators including Henry Cabot Lodge Jr. complained of Kenney's "belligerent" speech, and previous ones in the same vein by Symington, saying that matters of foreign policy should be left to the president and the secretary of state, not to leaders of the United States Air Force (USAF) Another controversy that Kenney became embroiled in concerned the Convair B-36 Peacemaker. He was less than impressed with this expensive and under-performing aircraft, preferring the Boeing B-50 Superfortress, an upgraded version of the B-29 instead. The USAF, however, had staked much of its credibility on the B-36, something that Kenney did not seem to appreciate.

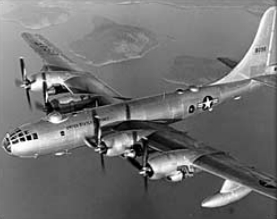
B-50 Superfortress.

In the context of the Berlin Blockade in June 1948, the Air Force Chief of Staff, General Hoyt S. Vandenberg, met with Forrestal to report the poor state of SAC. Following this meeting, Norstad recommended that Vandenberg replace Kenney, and Vandenberg quickly agreed, choosing Lieutenant General Curtis LeMay as the man he would prefer to lead the strategic bombing arm in case of war with the USSR. LeMay was made leader of SAC, and Kenney became commanding officer of the Air University, a position he held from October 1948 until his retirement from the Air Force in September 1951.

In April 1949, Kenney became the sixth person to receive the General William E. Mitchell Memorial Award. He was inducted into the National Aviation Hall of Fame in Dayton, Ohio, in 1971.

== Retirement ==
After his retirement, he lived in Bay Harbor Islands, Florida. In 1958 he appeared as the host of the TV anthology series Flight. He died on 9 August 1977, and is interred in Caballero Rivero Woodlawn Park North Cemetery and Mausoleum in Miami, Florida.

== Books ==
Kenney wrote three books about the SWPA air campaigns he led during World War II. His major work was General Kenney Reports (1949), a personal history of the air war he led from 1942 to 1945. He also wrote The Saga of Pappy Gunn (1959) and Dick Bong: Ace of Aces (1960), which described the careers of Paul Gunn and Richard Bong, two of the most prominent airmen under his command. In addition, he wrote a book about military leader General Douglas MacArthur titled The MacArthur I Know (1951).

== Family ==
He was survived by his two children, five grandsons and one granddaughter. His son, William "Bill" R. Kenney, rose to the rank of colonel in the USAF. His daughter, Julia, married Edward C. Hoagland Jr., a fighter pilot in World War II and later in Korea, who eventually retired from the USAF at the rank of lieutenant colonel.

== Dates of rank ==
Effective dates of rank, which count towards time in service, are when the officer formally accepted the appointment or promotion.

Insignia	Rank	Component	Date
No insignia at the time	Private first class	Enlisted Reserve Corps	2 June 1917
	First lieutenant	Officers' Reserve Corps	5 November (effective 8 November) 1917
	Captain	National Army (United States Army Air Service)	18 March 1919
	Captain	United States Army Air Service	1 July (effective 21 September) 1920
	First lieutenant	Regular Army (United States Army Air Service)	18 November 1922 (reverted to permanent rank)
	Captain	Regular Army (United States Army Air Service)	3 November 1923
	Major	Regular Army (United States Army Air Corps)	16 June (effective 22 June ) 1936 (temporary); 1 October 1937 (permanent)
	Lieutenant colonel	Regular Army (United States Army Air Corps)	2 March 1935 (temporary); 1 March (effective 11 March) 1940 (temporary); 29 November 1940 (permanent)
	Brigadier general	Army of the United States	29 January (effective 14 February) 1941
	Temporary Colonel	Regular Army (United States Army Air Forces)	15 July (effective 22 July) 1941
	Major general	Army of the United States	26 February 1942
	Lieutenant general	Army of the United States	15 October 1942
	Brigadier general	Regular Army (United States Army Air Forces)	1 September 1943
	Major general	Regular Army (United States Army Air Forces)	1 February 1945
	General	Army of the United States	9 March 1945
	General	United States Air Force, Retired	31 August 1951

=== Awards and decorations ===

Command Pilot
Army Distinguished Service Cross with one bronze oak leaf cluster	Army Distinguished Service Medal with two oak leaf clusters	Silver Star	Legion of Merit
Distinguished Flying Cross	Purple Heart	Presidential Unit Citation	World War I Victory Medal with four bronze service stars
Army of Occupation of Germany Medal	American Defense Service Medal	American Campaign Medal	Asiatic-Pacific Campaign Medal with six campaign stars
World War II Victory Medal	National Defense Service Medal	Knight Commander of the Order of the British Empire (Australia, Military Division)	Philippine Liberation Medal with two service stars

- Nine Overseas Service Bars, three for World War I and six for World War II

== Bibliography ==
- Kenney, George C. (1949). General Kenney Reports: A Personal History of the Pacific War. New York City: Duell, Sloan and Pearce. ISBN 0160613728. OCLC 37302833.
- —— (1959). The Saga of Pappy Gunn. New York City: Duell, Sloan and Pearce. OCLC 1253679.
- —— (1960). Dick Bong: Ace of Aces. New York City: Duell, Sloan and Pearce. OCLC 1292347.

== See also ==
- List of commanders-in-chief of the Strategic Air Command

Military offices
Preceded by None	Commander, Strategic Air Command; 1947–1948	Succeeded by Curtis LeMay
