= Edgar S. Harris Jr. =

United States Air Force general

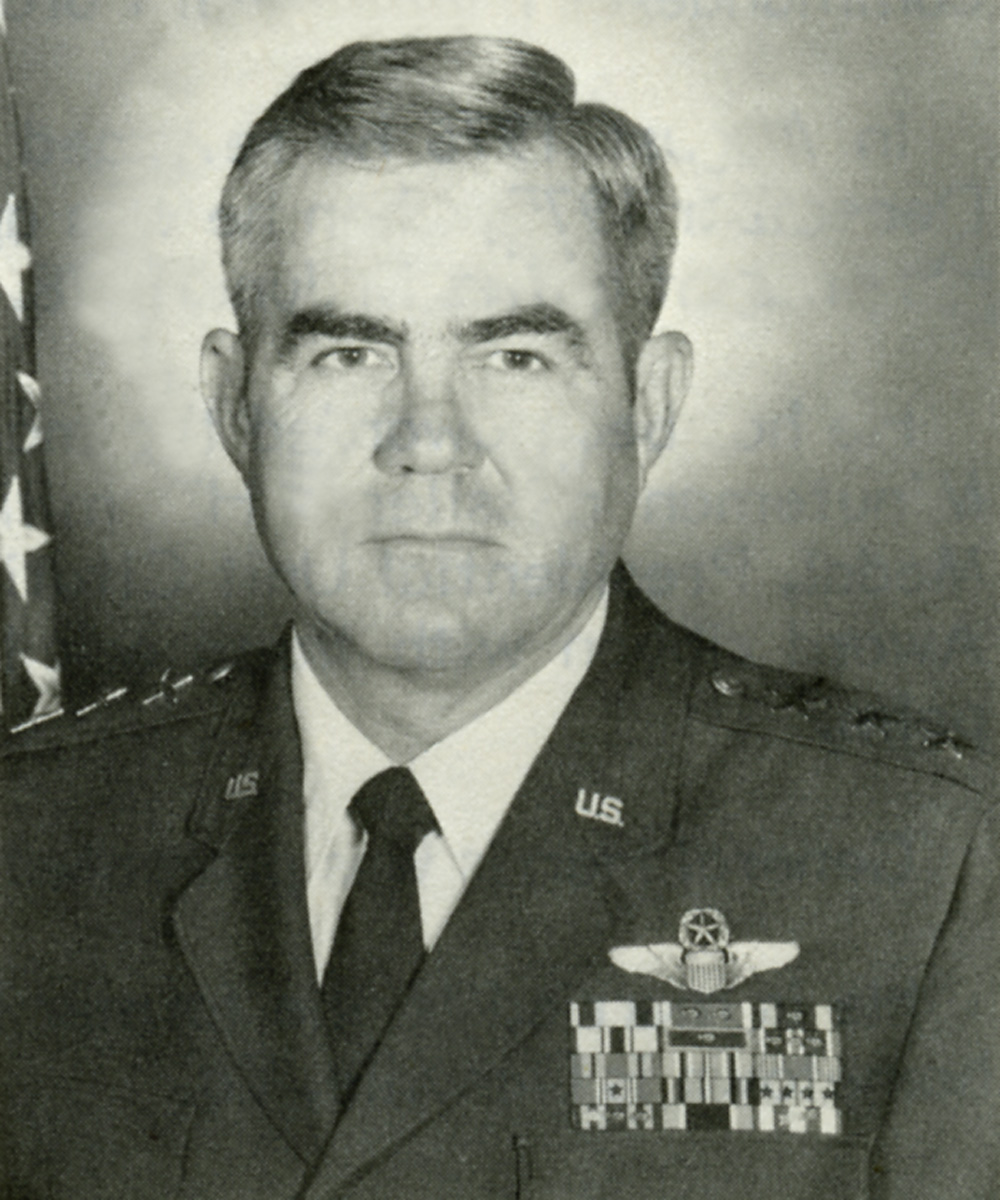
- Born: May 14, 1925; Danville, Virginia, U.S.
- Died: October 13, 2018 (aged 93); Fort Worth, Texas, U.S.
- Military career
- Allegiance: United States of America
- Branch: United States Air Force
- Service years: 1946–1981
- Rank: Lieutenant General
- Commands: Eighth Air Force; Vice Commander-in-Chief, Strategic Air Command

Edgar Starr Harris Jr. (May 14, 1925 – October 13, 2018) was an American Air Force lieutenant general whose last assignment was commander of Eighth Air Force, Strategic Air Command, with headquarters at Barksdale Air Force Base, Louisiana. During his over 30 years in the United States Air Force, Harris was also Chief of Staff and Vice Commander in Chief of the Strategic Air Command, where he spent most of his time during his service.

== Early life ==
Harris was born in Danville, Virginia. He graduated from the U.S. Military Academy, West Point, N.Y., with a bachelor of science degree in 1946. In 1961 he graduated from the Armed Forces Staff College, Norfolk, Virginia. He received a master's degree in international affairs from The George Washington University, Washington, D.C., in 1964 while attending the Naval War College, Newport, Rhode Island.

== Air Force career ==
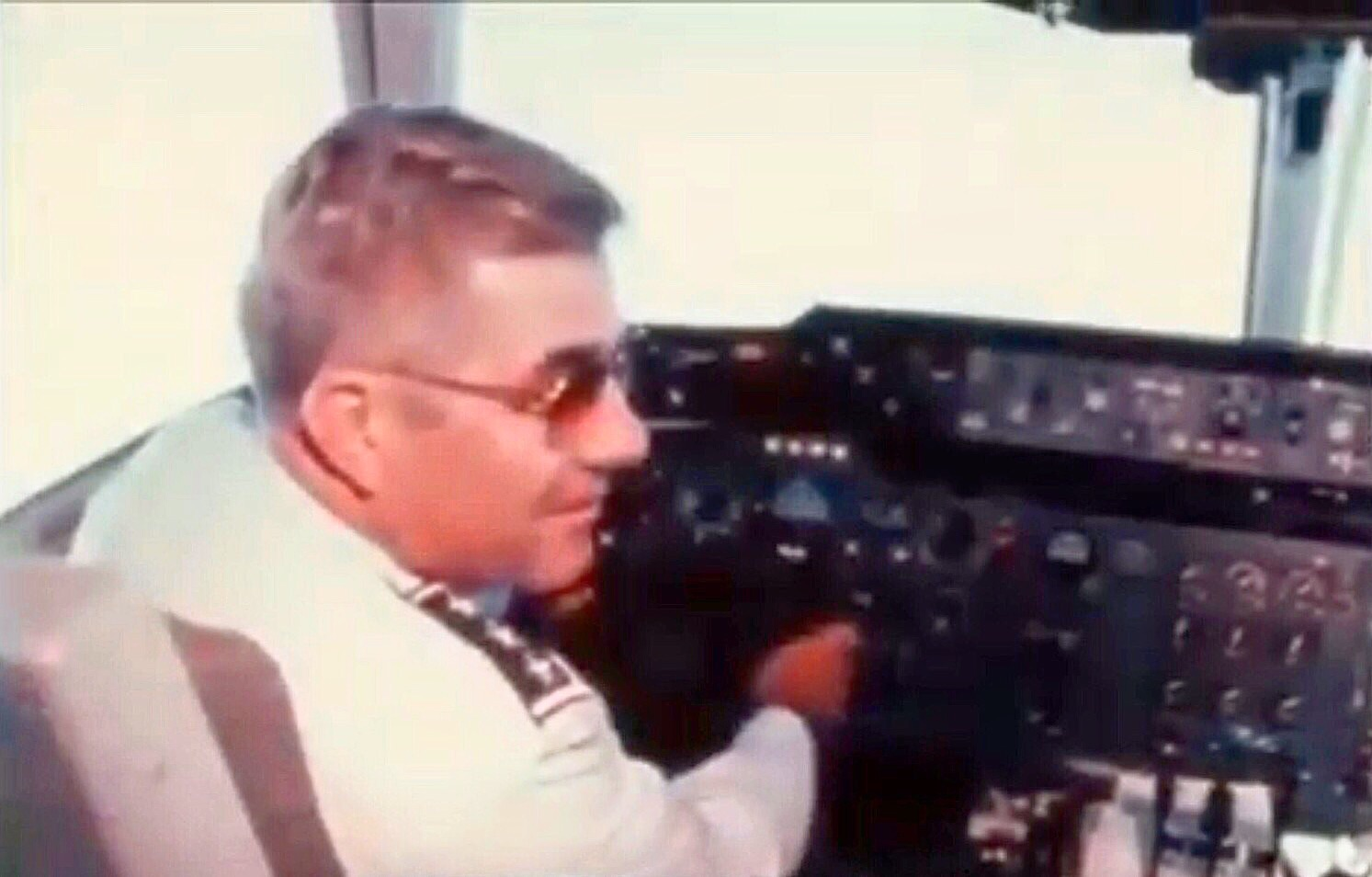
Lieutenant General Edgar S. Harris Jr. piloting a Strategic Air Command McDonnell-Douglas KC-10 Extender.

Harris spent the majority of his 33-year career in Strategic Air Command. He has served as a staff officer at various command levels and twice as a SAC wing and air division commander. He has had two assignments with the Organization of the Joint Chiefs of Staff.

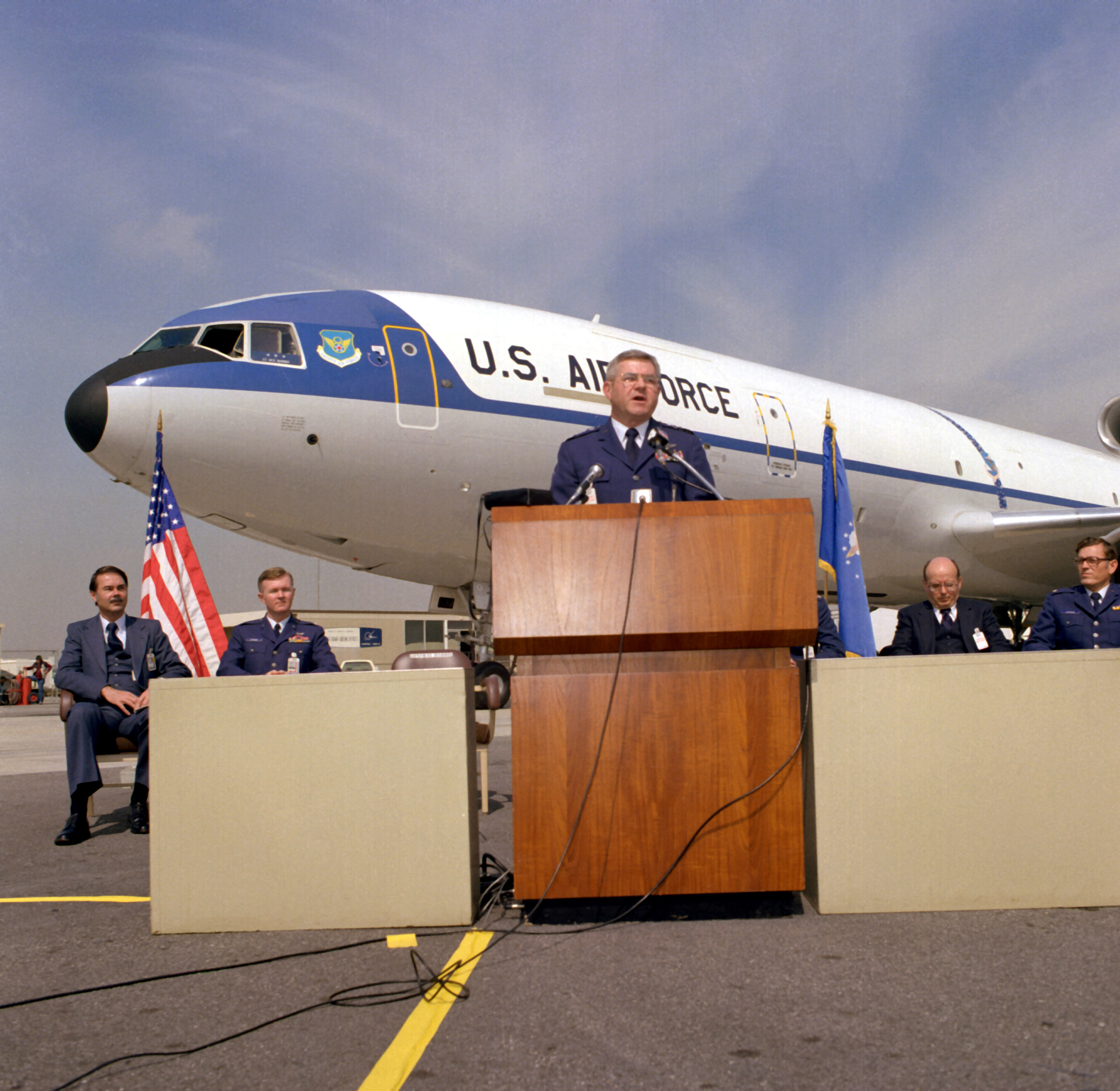
Lieutenant General speaks at the delivery ceremony for the new United States Air Force Tanker Aircraft, McDonnell-Douglas KC-10 Extender at McDonnell Douglas Corp. plant Headquarters in Berkeley, Missouri.

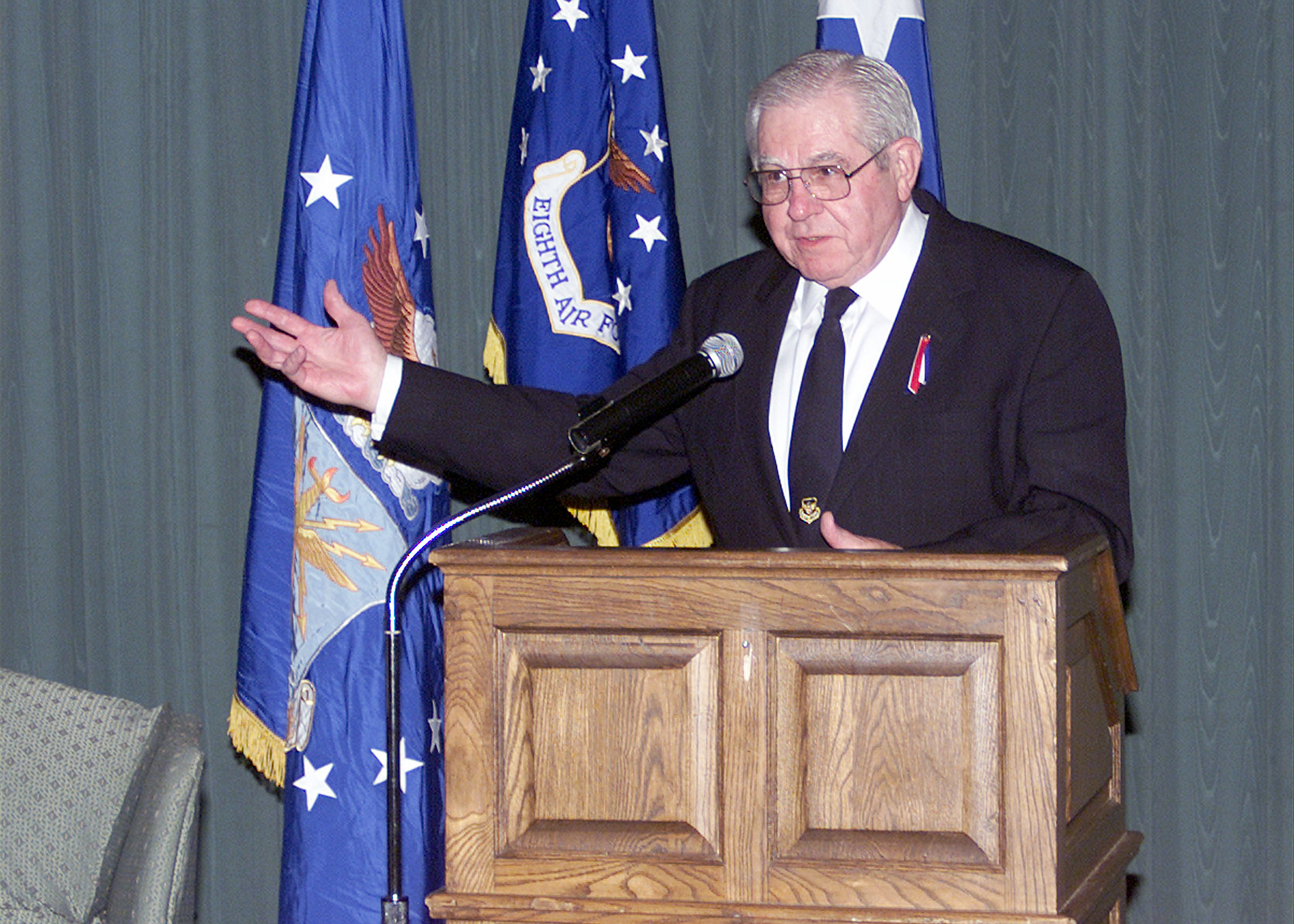
Retired Lieutenant General Edgar S. Harris, Jr. speaks during the Eighth Air Force 60th Anniversary dinner at Barksdale Air Force Base, Louisiana.

Harris received his pilot wings in 1946 and is a command pilot with more than 7,900 flying hours. He has piloted most SAC aircraft from B-29s to SR-71s.

After multiengine training at Enid, Oklahoma, he was assigned to the Bombardment Wing at Davis-Monthan Field, Ariz., in October 1946. He moved with the wing to Savannah, Ga., in April 1949. He accumulated crew duty experience in the B-29, B-47 and B-50 aircraft before moving to a staff position as chief of operations and plans.

In October 1955 he transferred to Sidi Slimane, Morocco, as an operations staff officer in the Directorate of Plans. Harris returned to the United States in December 1957 and served in the War Plans Branch, Headquarters SAC, Offutt Air Force Base, Neb. In 1960 he attended the Armed Forces Staff College. He subsequently was assigned to Seymour Johnson Air Force Base, N.C., where he served as a B-52 operations officer and squadron commander.

Harris received a master's degree in international affairs from The George Washington University while attending the Naval War College in 1964. Following graduation he returned to Headquarters SAC as chief of the Management Engineering Branch.

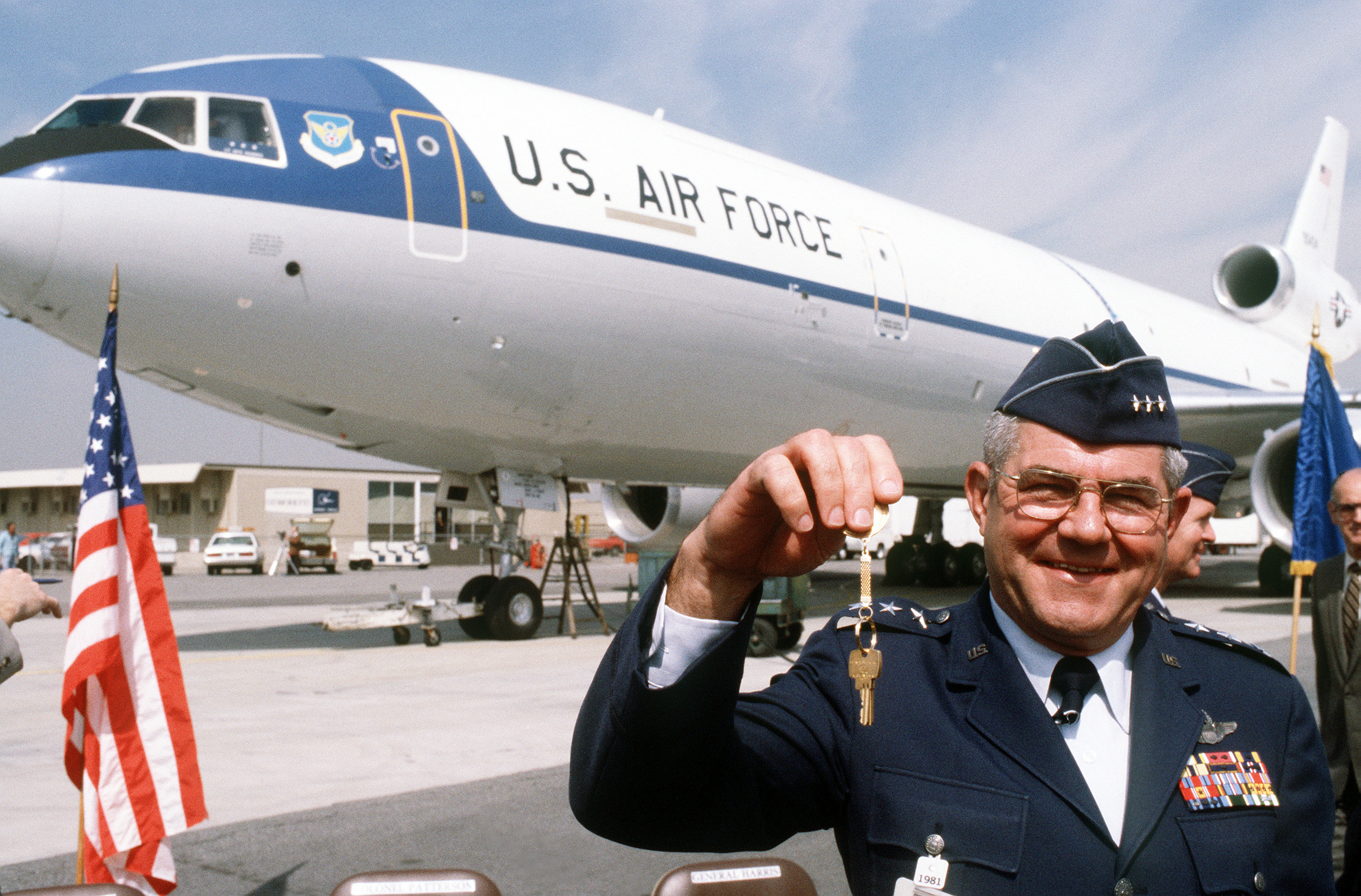
Commander of The Eight Air Force Lieutenant General Edgar S. Harris Jr. holds the keys of the brand new advanced tanker/cargo aircraft McDonnell-Douglas KC-10 Extender delivered to the United States Air Force Strategic Air Command.

In June 1966 he moved to Ellsworth Air Force Base, South Dakota, as vice wing commander and in June 1967 was named wing commander. During 1968 he led the B-52/KC-135 wing on its second tour of duty in Southeast Asia where he flew 43 combat missions.

Harris became wing commander at Dyess Air Force Base, Texas, in August 1968. In February 1970 he was assigned to the Organization of the Joint Chiefs of Staff, Washington, D.C., as chief, Strategic Operations Division, Directorate of Operations.

In September 1971 he transferred to Beale Air Force Base, Calif., to command the 14th Air Division where he assumed responsibility for B-52, KC-135, U-2 and SR-71 aircraft units. He remained there until June 1973 when he was assigned to March Air Force Base, Calif., as chief of staff, Fifteenth Air Force. During this time he was also assigned on temporary duty to command the 57th Air Division, Andersen Air Force Base, Guam.

Harris served as assistant deputy chief of staff for operations, Headquarters SAC, from February 1974 until May 1975 when he returned to March Air Force Base as vice commander, Fifteenth Air Force.

In August 1976 he returned to Headquarters SAC as chief of staff, a position he held until December 1977. Harris was promoted to the rank of Lieutenant General on February 2, 1978, when he was appointed as Vice Commanders-in-Chief of the Strategic Air Command. Harris assumed his present duties in June 1978.

In 1978 Harris was appointed as commander of the Eighth Air Force, Headquarters at Barksdale Air Force Base, Louisiana, U.S. During his tenure as commander of Eight Air Force, Harris oversaw the procurement and delivery of the United States Air Force brand new tanker-aircraft, the McDonnell-Douglas KC-10 Extender. The McDonnell-Douglas KC-10 Extender began its service within the United States Air Force Strategic Air Command on March 1, 1981, and Harris oversaw the delivery of the second built McDonnell-Douglas KC-10 Extender which was about to be delivered to the Air Force and assigned in the Eight Air Force. Harris also flew the McDonnell-Douglas KC-10 Extender himself, from McDonnell Douglas Corp. plant at Berkeley, Missouri, to Eight Air Force Headquarters at Barksdale Air Force Base, Louisiana.

He has been awarded the master missile man badge as a result of his experience with Titan and Minuteman missiles. His military decorations and awards include the Distinguished Service Medal, Presidential Unit Citation emblem with oak leaf cluster, Air Force Outstanding Unit Award ribbon with three oak leaf clusters and the Republic of Vietnam Gallantry Cross with palm.

His hometown is Danville, Virginia. Harris died on October 13, 2018, at the age of 93.
