= George D. Miller =

United States Air Force general

George Miller
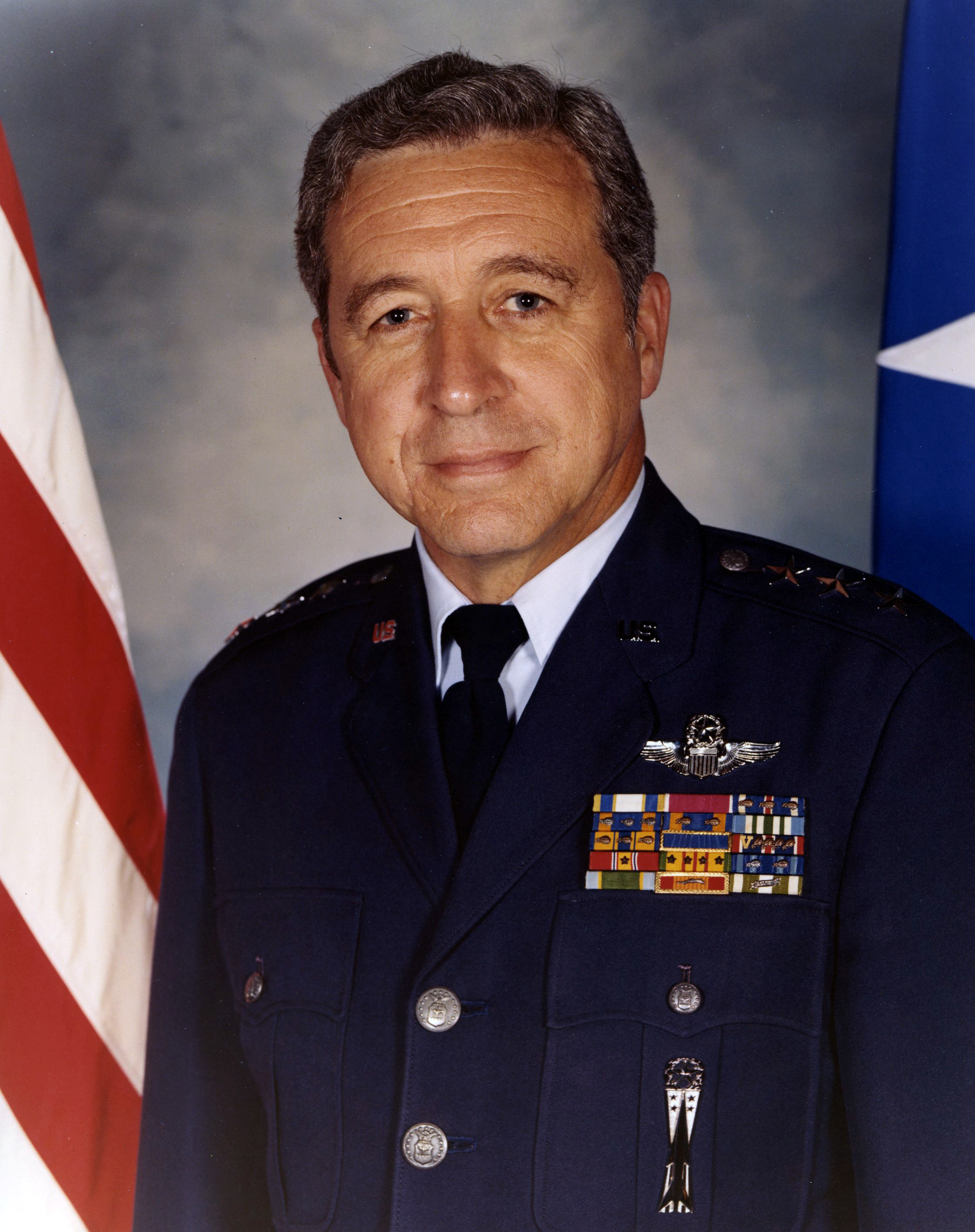
- Born: April 5, 1930 (age 96); McKeesport, Pennsylvania
- Military career
- Allegiance: United States of America
- Branch: United States Air Force
- Service years: 1954–1984
- Rank: Lieutenant General
- Commands: Vice Commander-in-Chief, Strategic Air Command

George David Miller (born April 5, 1930) is a retired American Air Force lieutenant general whose last assignment was vice commander in chief, Strategic Air Command, headquartered at Offutt Air Force Base, Nebraska. He assumed this position September 1, 1981, and served until August 31, 1984.

Miller was born in 1930, in McKeesport, Pennsylvania, where he graduated from McKeesport Technical High School in 1948 and then attended Fork Union Military Academy. In 1949 he entered the United States Naval Academy, Annapolis, Maryland, and earned a Bachelor of Science degree and a commission as a second lieutenant in the U.S. Air Force in 1953. He received a Master of Science degree in aerospace engineering from the Air Force Institute of Technology, Wright-Patterson Air Force Base, Ohio, in 1966 and graduated from the National War College, Fort Lesley J. McNair, Washington, D.C., in 1971.

After graduation from the academy, he received his pilot wings in August 1954 at Goodfellow Air Force Base, Texas. In November 1954 he joined the 2317th Air Transport Squadron at Hamilton Air Force Base, Calif., and was accepted for jet pilot training. Following all-weather interceptor school at Moody Air Force Base, Georgia, he was assigned to the 438th Fighter-Interceptor Squadron at Kincheloe Air Force Base, Michigan, as an F-89D and F-102 pilot from 1956 to 1960. While there he also served as quality control officer and flight test maintenance officer for the 507th Consolidated Maintenance Squadron.

Miller completed combat crew training in RB-66s and in July 1960 was assigned to the 10th Tactical Reconnaissance Wing's 30th Tactical Reconnaissance Squadron at Royal Air Force Station Alconbury, England, as an RB-66 aircraft commander. He later become standardization evaluation examiner for the wing. In July 1961 he became aide-de-camp and pilot for the 3rd Air Force commander at South Ruislip Air Station, England.

In April 1964 Miller began graduate studies at the Air Force Institute of Technology's School of Engineering. After graduation he was assigned to the Office of the Assistant Chief of Staff for Studies and Analysis, Headquarters U.S. Air Force, Washington, D.C. He was responsible for producing computerized theory and gaming techniques for determining the necessary size of tactical air forces for the 1970 to 1980 period. He was also a member of a quick-reaction study group which produced studies for the secretary of the Air Force and the Joint Chiefs of Staff.

He volunteered for duty in Southeast Asia in May 1969. Following combat crew training in A-1s at Hurlburt Field, Florida, he was assigned to the 56th Special Operations Wing at Nakhon Phanom Royal Thai Air Force Base, Thailand, from June 1969 to June 1970. He was operations officer and later commander of the 22nd Special Operations Squadron and flew 217 day and night combat missions.

Following graduation from the National War College in June 1971, he was assigned to the 55th Strategic Reconnaissance Wing at Offutt Air Force Base as deputy commander for operations. In February 1972 he became vice commander of the wing and in August 1972 assumed command. During his command he was responsible for the 343rd Strategic Reconnaissance Squadron, which has a global reconnaissance mission, and the 2nd Airborne Command Control Squadron, which has kept the Strategic Air Command airborne command post on station continuously since 1961. Miller proposed and developed new techniques, procedures and equipment analysis methods for the airborne command post and the airborne launch and control system resulting in performance never before achieved.

Miller went to U-Tapao Royal Thai Naval Airfield, Thailand, in August 1974 as commander of the 17th Air Division (Provisional). He took command of the 307th Strategic Wing at U-Tapao when the 17th Air Division was inactivated as U.S. forces continued their withdrawal from Thailand.

In January 1975 he transferred to Minot Air Force Base, North Dakota, to command the reactivated 57th Air Division. Miller was then assigned to SAC headquarters at Offutt Air Force Base as assistant deputy chief of staff, operations, in April 1976 and become the deputy chief of staff, operations plans, as well as deputy director for the Single Integrated Operational Plan, Joint Strategic Target Planning Staff, in January 1977. In June 1979 he became director of plans in the Office of the Deputy Chief of Staff, Operations, Plans and Readiness at Air Force headquarters, and in July 1980 was named assistant deputy chief of staff for operations, plans and readiness. He assumed his present duties in September 1981.

Miller is a command pilot and wears the Master Missile Badge. His military decorations and awards include the Distinguished Service Medal, Legion of Merit, Distinguished Flying Cross with three oak leaf clusters, Air Medal with 18 oak leaf clusters, Joint Service Commendation Medal, Air Force Commendation Medal with three oak leaf clusters, Presidential Unit Citation emblem, and Air Force Outstanding Unit Award ribbon with "V" device and four oak leaf clusters.

He was promoted to lieutenant general on September 1, 1981, with same date of rank and retired on September 4, 1984. He is a former president of the National Fire Protection Association and former executive director of the United States Olympic Committee.
