= Thomas S. Power =

US Air Force general

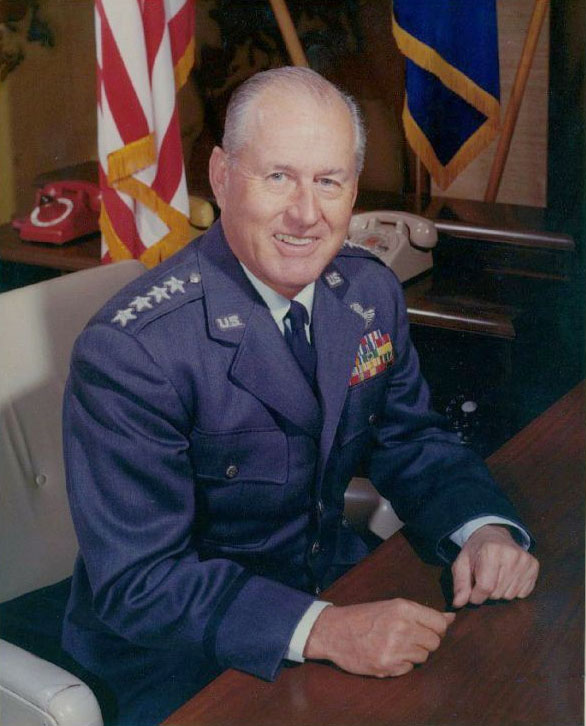
- General Thomas Sarsfield Power
- Born: June 18, 1905; New York City, New York, U.S.
- Died: December 6, 1970 (aged 65); Palm Springs, California, U.S.
- Military career
- Allegiance: United States
- Branch: United States Air Force
- Service years: 1929–1964
- Rank: General
- Commands: Strategic Air Command; Air Research and Development Command
- Conflicts: World War II
- Awards: Air Force Distinguished Service Medal; Army Distinguished Service Medal; Silver Star; Legion of Merit (2); Distinguished Flying Cross; Bronze Star Medal; Air Medal (2)

General Thomas Sarsfield Power (June 18, 1905 – December 6, 1970) was a United States Air Force officer who served as commander in chief of the Strategic Air Command from 1957-1964. He was an active military flier for more than 30 years.

== Early career ==
Thomas Sarsfield Power was born in New York City in 1905, a child of Irish immigrants. His parents were Thomas Stack Power, a dried goods salesman, and Mary Amelia Power (née Rice), who had arrived in the United States in 1900. His parents were from wealthy farming stock but the best land and its livestock was destined for others in Tipperary, Ireland.

Power attended Barnard Preparatory School in New York and entered the United States Army Air Corps flying school February 17, 1928. Upon graduation and receiving his rating, he was commissioned a second lieutenant in the Army Air Corps on February 28, 1929.

His early service included assignments at most of the famed Air Corps fields of the day – Chanute Field, Illinois, as a student officer at the Air Corps Technical School's maintenance engineer course; Langley Field, Virginia, as commanding officer of the 2d Wing headquarters detachment (1934); Bolling Field, Washington, D.C., for duty as an Army Air Corps Mail Operation (Eastern Zone) pilot (1934); engineering and armament officer of the 28th Bombardment Squadron at Nichols Field, Philippines; and at Randolph Field, Texas, as a flying instructor (1938–1940). He completed his early career at Maxwell Field, Alabama, as a student at the Air Corps Tactical School (1940–1941).

== World War II ==
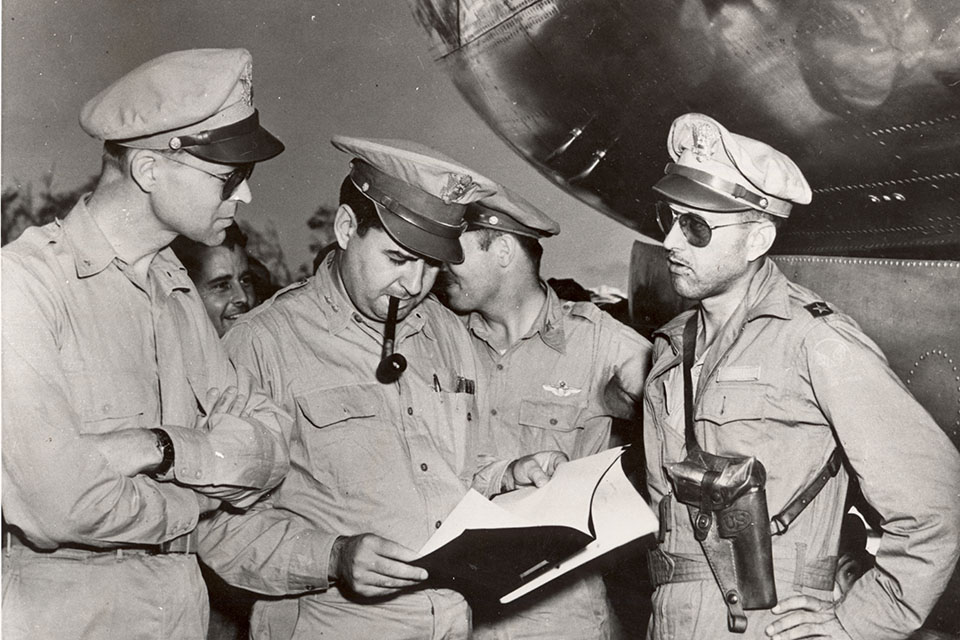
Brigadier General Power with Major General Curtis LeMay and Brigadier General Lauris Norstad review reports of the Tokyo raid in Guam, March 1945.

After the era of slow promotions during the inter-war years of the 1930s, Power experienced the rapid rise in rank common to many officers of the pre-war Air Corps during World War II, becoming a major in March 1941, a lieutenant colonel in January 1942, and a full colonel in June 1943 eight days after his 38th birthday.

Power initially performed staff duties to September 1943 at Army Air Forces Flying Training Command headquarters in Fort Worth, Texas. Following his promotion to colonel he was assigned as deputy commander of the 58th Bombardment Operational Training Wing (Heavy) at Smoky Hill AAF, Salina, Kansas. After a brief tour as assistant chief of staff for operations of the Second Air Force in Colorado Springs, Colorado, Power gained combat experience flying B-24 missions in Italy while deputy commander of the 304th Bomb Wing between January and July 1944.

After returning to the United States in August 1944, Power was named commander of the 314th Bomb Wing (Very Heavy) and promoted to brigadier general in January 1945. Power moved his B-29s to Guam in December 1944 as part of the 21st Bomber Command. From Guam, he directed the first large-scale fire bomb raid on Tokyo, Japan, on March 9, 1945. In a command aircraft, flying back and forth over Tokyo during the attack, Power was deeply impressed by the inferno of destruction playing out thousands of feet below. He later commented, "True there is no room for emotions in war... but the destruction I witnessed that night over Tokyo was so overwhelming that it left a tremendous and lasting impression on me."

On August 1, 1945, General Carl Spaatz, then commander of the United States Strategic Air Forces in the Pacific, moved Power up on his staff as deputy chief of staff for operations (A-3). He served in this capacity during the atomic bomb attacks on Hiroshima and Nagasaki.

== Cold War and Strategic Air Command ==
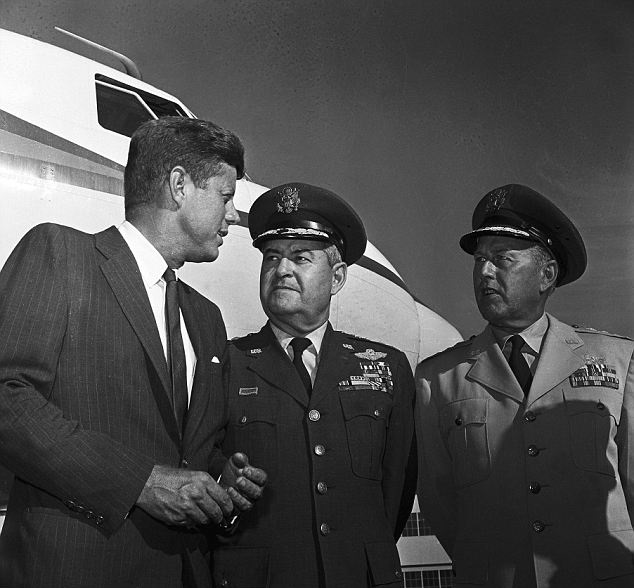
CINCSAC General Thomas S. Power with Air Force Chief of Staff General Curtis E. LeMay and President John F. Kennedy at Strategic Air Command Headquarters.

During Operation Crossroads, the 1946 atomic bomb tests at Bikini Atoll, Power was assigned as assistant deputy task force commander for air on Admiral William H. P. Blandy's staff. Then came assignments as deputy assistant chief of air staff for operations in Washington and a period of air attaché duty in London, prior to his transfer to the Strategic Air Command as vice commander in 1948. During the next six years, Power assisted General Curtis E. LeMay, then commander in chief of the Strategic Air Command, in building up SAC. He was then appointed commander of the Air Research and Development Command in 1954, a position he held for three years.

When General LeMay was named vice chief of staff of the Air Force in 1957, Power became commander in chief of SAC and was promoted to four-star rank.

Power was the architect of the Operation Chrome Dome airborne alert program of SAC that ensured that a proportion of the nuclear-armed strategic bombers were always aloft so as to survive a first strike.

When RAND proposed a counterforce strategy, which would require SAC to restrain itself from striking Soviet cities at the beginning of a war, Power countered with:

Restraint? Why are you so concerned with saving their lives? The whole idea is to kill the bastards. At the end of the war if there are two Americans and one Russian left alive, we win!

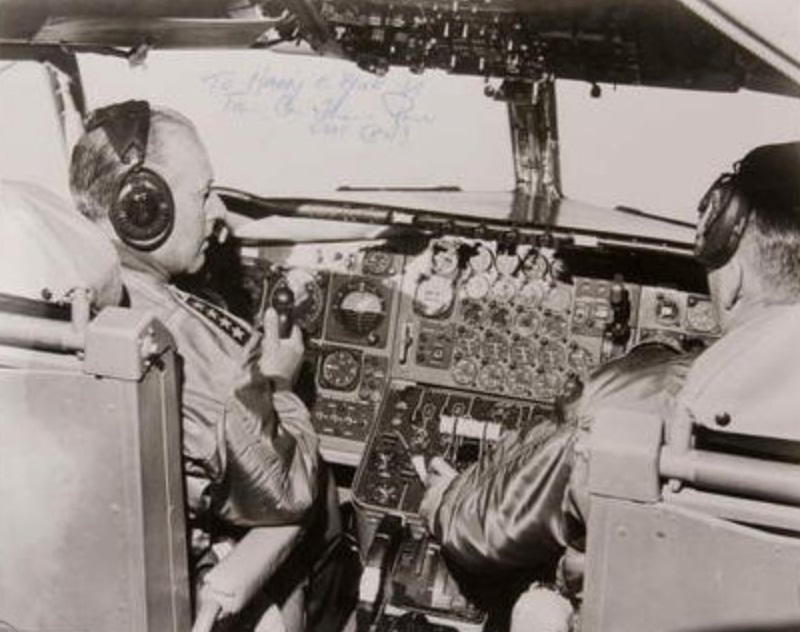
Power flying a Boeing KC-135 Stratotanker during his tenure as Commander-in-Chief of Strategic Air Command.

William Kaufmann from the RAND Corporation, losing his patience, noted: "Well, you'd better make sure that they're a man and a woman." At that point, Power stalked out of the room. The briefing was over. Having been briefed by another famous member of the RAND Corporation, Herman Kahn, on the genetic effects of nuclear weapons, Power replied: "You know, it's not yet been proved to me that two heads aren't better than one."

On October 24, 1962, during the Cuban Missile Crisis, SAC was ordered to "DEFCON 2," one step short of nuclear war. Although authorized to increase his alert level, Power took the unprecedented – and unauthorized – action of broadcasting that message to global Strategic Air Command (SAC) nuclear forces "in the clear" (on non-scrambled, open radio channels), presumably in an attempt to scare the Soviets into complying with American demands.

Raymond Garthoff, who was a participant in the crisis, noted that:

...the Soviet political and military leaders must have been puzzled and alarmed at this flaunting of the American strategic superiority, so great that the United States could afford to ignore normal operational security in order to drive home the extent of its power. Equally extraordinary, and not known in Moscow, was that this remarkable display of American power was unauthorized by and unknown to the President, the Secretary of Defense, the Chairman of the JCS, and the EXCOMM as they so carefully calibrated and controlled action in the intensifying confrontation. The decision for this bold action was taken by General Thomas Powers [sic], commander-in-chief of SAC, on his own initiative. He had been ordered to go on full alert, and he did so. No one had told him how to do it, and he decided to 'rub it in.'

Garthoff gives as his source:

I was first told about this action soon after the crisis by Major General (then Colonel) George J. Keegan Jr., then SAC chief of intelligence, who was present when General Powers [sic] gave the order and it was executed.

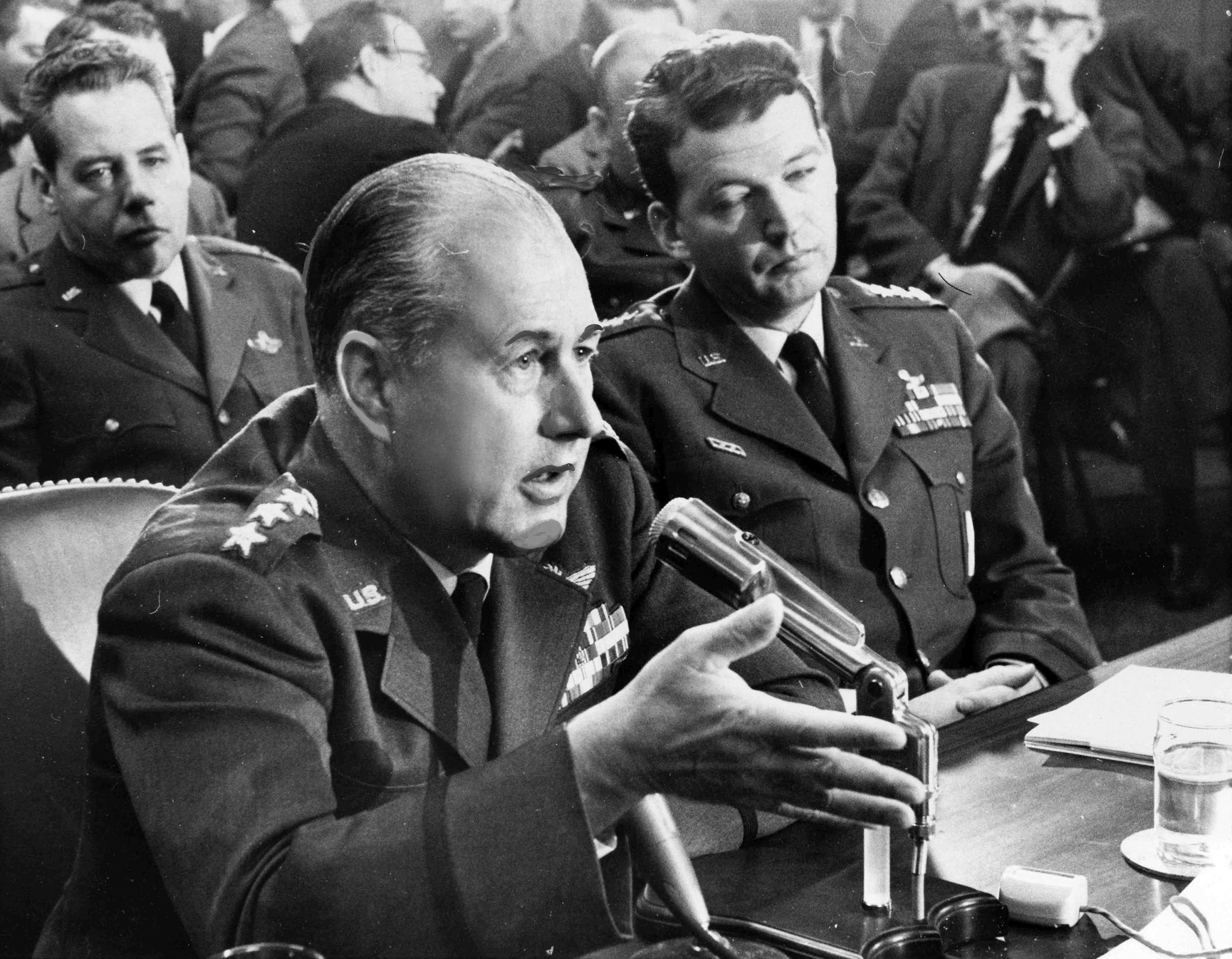
Commanders-in-chief of The Strategic Air Command General Thomas S. Power with Commander of Air Force System Command General Bernard A. Schriever during senate hearing at The Capitol Hill.

On October 24, shortly after DEFCON 2 was declared, General Power sent the following special message to all SAC wings, in a clear (uncoded) voice transmission, emphasizing the need for safety and caution in the dangerous operation:

This is General Power speaking. I am addressing you for the purpose of reemphasizing the seriousness of the situation the nation faces. We are in an advanced state of readiness to meet any emergencies, and I feel that we are well prepared. I expect each of you to maintain strict security and use calm judgement during this tense period. Our plans are well prepared and are being executed smoothly. If there are any questions concerning instructions which by the nature of the situation deviates from the normal, use the telephone for clarification. Review your plans for further action to insure that there will be no mistakes or confusion. I expect you to cut out all nonessentials and put yourself in a maximum readiness condition. If you are not sure what you should do in any situation, and if time permits, get in touch with us here.

== Death and legacy ==
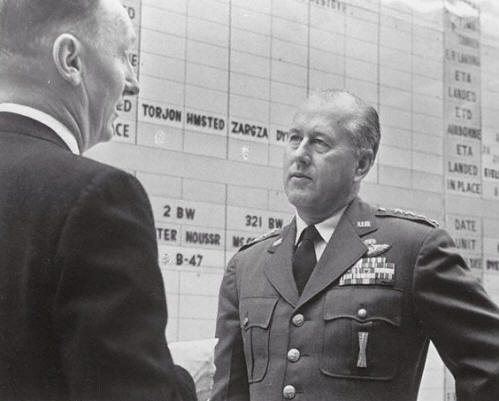
Power at Strategic Air Command Control and Command Center on Strategic Air Command's Headquarters at Offutt Air Force Base, Nebraska on 1957.

Power retired from the Air Force on November 30, 1964 and died of a heart attack December 6, 1970. He was a rated command pilot and aircraft observer, and was America's last general officer with no post-secondary education.

LeMay described Power, his protégé, as a sadist. Sagan quoted a subordinate commander of Power as describing him as "A hard, cruel individual ... I used to worry about General Power. I used to worry that General Power was not stable."

== Awards and recognition ==
General Power was awarded the Air Force Distinguished Service Medal, Army Distinguished Service Medal, Silver Star, Legion of Merit with oak leaf cluster, Distinguished Flying Cross, Bronze Star, Air Medal with oak leaf cluster, Air Force Commendation Medal with oak leaf cluster, and the French Croix de Guerre with Palm.

- Air Force Command Pilot Badge
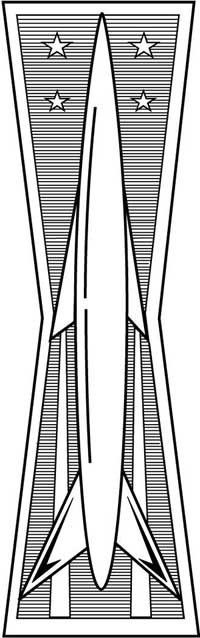
- Missileman Badge
- Air Force Distinguished Service Medal
- Army Distinguished Service Medal
- Silver Star
- Legion of Merit with oak leaf cluster
- Distinguished Flying Cross
- Bronze Star
- Air Medal
- Air Force Commendation Medal with oak leaf cluster
- French Croix de Guerre with Palm.

== See also ==
- List of commanders-in-chief of the Strategic Air Command

Military offices
Preceded by Curtis E. LeMay	Commander, Strategic Air Command; 1957–1964	Succeeded by John Dale Ryan
