= Leo Smit =

Leo Smit may refer to:

- Leo Smit (American composer) (1921–1999), American composer
- Leo Smit (Dutch composer) (1900–1943), Dutch composer and pianist.

== See also ==
- Smit
- Leo Smith (disambiguation)
