= Kenneth L. Peek Jr. =

United States Air Force general (1932–2020)

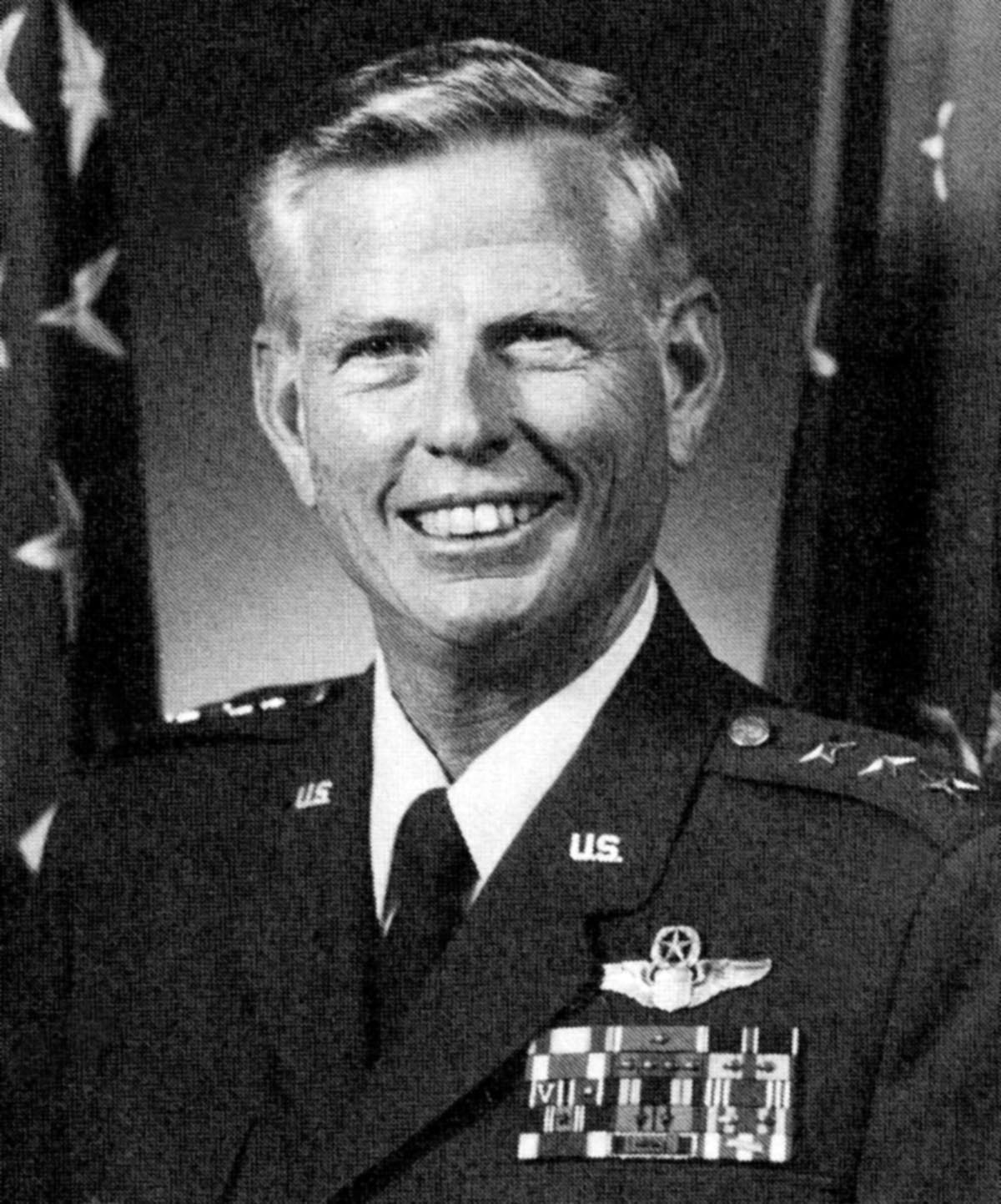
- Born: July 25, 1932; Indianapolis, Indiana
- Died: July 20, 2020 (aged 87); Waco, Texas
- Burial place: Arlington National Cemetery
- Military career
- Allegiance: United States of America
- Branch: United States Air Force
- Service years: 1953–1988
- Rank: Lieutenant General
- Commands: Vice Commander-in-Chief, Strategic Air Command

Kenneth Leroy Peek Jr. (July 25, 1932 – July 20, 2020) was an American Air Force lieutenant general whose last assignment was vice commander in chief, Strategic Air Command, headquartered at Offutt Air Force Base, Nebraska. He assumed this position January 30, 1987 and served until September 9, 1988.

== Biography ==
Peek was born in 1932, in Indianapolis, where he graduated from Ben Davis High School. He attended Wabash College, and Indiana State College, Terre Haute, majoring in business administration. He earned a bachelor's degree in business administration and management from the University of Nebraska, Omaha, in 1964 and a master's degree in mass communications from Shippensburg University of Pennsylvania in 1974. He completed Squadron Officer School in 1961, the Armed Forces Staff College in 1970 and the Army War College in 1974.

He entered the aviation cadet program in September 1953 at Lackland Air Force Base, Texas, and received his primary training at Bartow Airfield, Florida. After completing basic flying training at Bryan Air Force Base, Texas, as a distinguished graduate, he was commissioned a second lieutenant in February 1955.

After completing intelligence officer school at Sheppard Air Force Base, Texas, in June 1955, Peek was assigned to the 40th Bombardment Wing, Smoky Hill Air Force Base, Kan., as an intelligence officer. In April 1957 he entered B-47 combat crew training and later flew B-47s as a co-pilot, aircraft commander and instructor pilot for the 40th Bombardment Wing at Schilling and Forbes Air Force bases, Kan. While assigned to the 40th, Peek completed Squadron Officer School, the central flight instructors course at McConnell Air Force Base, Kansas, and the instrument instructor course at Randolph Air Force Base, Texas. In 1962 Peek resumed wing staff duty as programs and scheduling officer until he entered the University of Nebraska in September 1964.

In April 1965 Peek was assigned to SAC headquarters, where he served successively as chief of the Tanker Manning Section, chief of rated officer assignments and deputy chief of officer assignments. He departed in August 1969 to attend the Armed Forces Staff College. Upon graduation in January 1970, he was assigned to Castle Air Force Base, Calif., for B-52 combat crew training.

In July 1970 he became the executive officer for the 307th Strategic Wing at U-Tapao Royal Thai Naval Airfield, Thailand. During this tour of duty he completed 101 combat missions in the B-52 Stratofortress.

Returning to the United States in August 1971, Peek become deputy commander for operations, 5th Bombardment Wing, Minot Air Force Base, N.D. In May 1972 he transferred to Headquarters U.S. Air Force, Washington, D.C., as executive officer to the assistant secretary of the Air Force for financial management. He served in that position until May 1973 when he entered the Army War College.

After graduating in July 1974, Peek transferred to Fairchild Air Force Base, Washington, as base commander. In April 1975 he became director of operations for the 47th Air Division at Fairchild. From July 1975 to February 1977 Peek served as commander of the 5th Bombardment Wing, Minot Air Force Base. He was then assigned to SAC headquarters, where he was responsible for the SAC underground and airborne command posts.

In March 1979 Peek was assigned as vice commander of the Air Force Manpower and Personnel Center at Randolph Air Force Base. In June 1980 he assumed the dual role of commander of the center and assistant deputy chief of staff, manpower and personnel for military personnel. His responsibilities included the overall force distribution and management of all Air Force military personnel except general officers.

Peek returned to Air Force headquarters in July 1982 as director of personnel plans in the Office of the Deputy Chief of Staff, Manpower and Personnel. In July 1983 he became the deputy chief of staff, manpower and personnel. He was assigned as commander, 8th Air Force, with headquarters at Barksdale Air Force Base, La., in August 1984. He assumed his present duties in January 1987.

He is a command pilot with approximately 5,500 flying hours, and 101 B-52 combat missions in Southeast Asia. His military decorations and awards include the Distinguished Service Medal, Legion of Merit with oak leaf cluster, Bronze Star Medal, Meritorious Service Medal, Air Medal with four oak leaf clusters and Air Force Commendation Medal with two oak leaf clusters. Peek also has been awarded the Order of the Sword, presented to those held in the highest esteem by Air Force noncommissioned officers.

He was promoted to lieutenant general July 1, 1983 and retired on October 1, 1988. Peek died on July 20, 2020.
