= Bombing of Hollandia =

World War II Allied bombing raids prior to the Battle of Hollandia

- Part of the New Guinea campaign
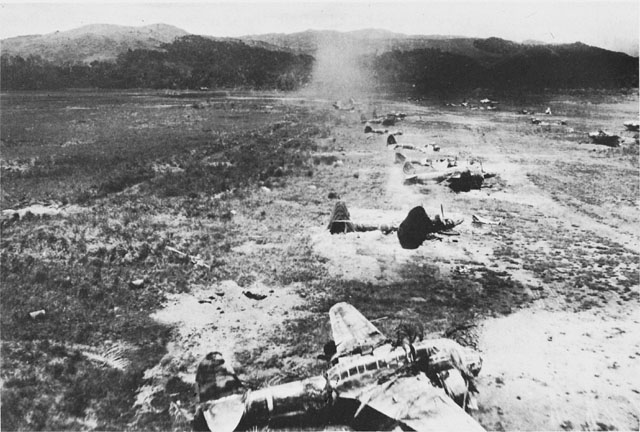
- Destroyed Japanese aircraft on a Hollandia airfield. The closest aircraft in a row is a Kawasaki Ki-48.
Date	30 March – 3 April 1944
Location	Hollandia, Dutch New Guinea
Result	Allied victory

Belligerents
United States	Japan

Commanders and leaders
(United States) Douglas MacArthur; (United States) George Kenney	(Empire of Japan) Hatazo Adachi; (Empire of Japan) Giichi Itabana

Units involved
(United States) Fifth Air Force	(Empire of Japan) 18th Army; (Empire of Japan) 6th Air Division

Strength
200 bombers; 150 fighters	Exact number unknown

Casualties and losses
4 destroyed: 2 P-38 fighters; 1 B-24 bomber; 1 F-7 reconnaissance plane	400 planes destroyed or heavily damaged (allied claim)

From 30 March to 3 April 1944 the United States Fifth Air Force, under the command of General George Kenney, conducted a series of bombing raids on the important airbase of Hollandia that led to the destruction of a large number of Japanese aircraft. This raid was an important factor in the success of the upcoming Battle of Hollandia later in April.

On 30–31 March the Fifth Air Force destroyed or heavily damaged a total of 208 Japanese aircraft. After a two day break for rest and weather delays on 3 April the U.S. bombers and fighters made the biggest bombing raid of the whole operation when 66 B-24 bombers and 96 A-20 bombers with escorting fighters destroyed or heavily damaged around 200 more Japanese aircraft. After the invasion of Hollandia occurred weeks later the Allied forces on the ground claimed 340 Japanese planes were destroyed on the airfield. Gunner crews and fighter pilots claimed another 60 planes destroyed in dogfights, though these claims, along with the claims of the aircraft destroyed on the ground, are most likely inaccurate. This was the last major Japanese airbase in New Guinea with a substantial number of aircraft that could threaten the U.S. and Australian forces. After the Hollandia bombing raid the Japanese no longer had any substantial air power in all of New Guinea for the rest of the war. Air supremacy was established by the Allied forces. One squadron reported after returning from the raid that "Hollandia had really been Wewaked.'"

Japanese prisoners-of-war and captured documents later revealed that the reason the bombing operation was so successful was because the Japanese high command erroneously transported too many airplanes to Hollandia from the Philippines and the Dutch East Indies but did not transport more pilots and maintenance crews with the airplanes. There was no way for them to build appropriate defensive shelters to protect all 400 aircraft and also there were not enough trained pilots who could fly all of those airplanes at the same time so many perfectly operational aircraft were left sitting there with no aircrew to maintain them. The morale at Hollandia airbase was very low during the bombing operation, with many Japanese soldiers and airmen hiding in bunkers instead of manning anti-aircraft artillery and getting airplanes into the air. Most of these Hollandia soldiers and airmen were rear-echelon and not combat-oriented at all because most of the combat-trained divisions from the 18th Army were recently sent further east in anticipation of amphibious landings that would never come thanks to deception and feints by the U.S. and Australians. A Japanese seaman commented, "Yesterday, the anniversary of the birthday of Emperor Meiji, we received from the enemy, greetings, which amount to the annihilation of our Army Air Force in New Guinea."
