= List of commanders-in-chief of the Strategic Air Command =

Commander-in-Chief, United States Air Force Strategic Air Command
- Department of Defense
- Style: CinC SAC
- Inaugural holder: Gen. George C. Kenney
- Formation: 21 March 1946
- Final holder: Gen. Lee Butler
- Abolished: 31 May 1992
- Succession: Air Combat Command; Strategic Command

The Commander-in-Chief, Strategic Air Command (CINCSAC) was the most senior officer and head of the Strategic Air Command (SAC).

== List of SAC Commanders-in-Chief ==
	Name	Photo	Term began	Term ended	Notes
1	Gen George Kenney		21 March 1946	15 October 1948	(1889–1977); Designated as Commanding General
2	Gen Curtis LeMay		19 October 1948	30 June 1957	(1906–1993): Designated as Commanding General (1948–1953) and Commander (1953–1957); Vice Chief of Staff of the United States Air Force (1957-1961); Chief of Staff of the United States Air Force (1961-1965)
3	Gen Thomas S. Power		1 July 1957	30 November 1964	(1905–1970)
4	Gen John Dale Ryan		1 December 1964	31 January 1967	(1915–1983): Commanders-in-Chief of The Pacific Air Forces (1967-1968); Vice Chief of Staff of the United States Air Force (1968-1969); Chief of Staff of the United States Air Force (1969-1973)
5	Gen Joseph J. Nazzaro		1 February 1967	31 July 1968	(1913–1990): Commanders-in-Chief of The Pacific Air Forces (1968-1971)
6	Gen Bruce K. Holloway		1 August 1968	30 April 1972	(1912–1999): Commander-in-Chief of The United States Air Forces in Europe 1965–1966.; Vice Chief of Staff of the United States Air Force, 1966–1968.
7	Gen John C. Meyer		1 May 1972	31 July 1974	(1919–1975): Vice Chief of Staff of the United States Air Force, 1969–1972.
8	Gen Russell E. Dougherty		1 August 1974	31 July 1977	(1920–2007)
9	Gen Richard H. Ellis		1 August 1977	31 July 1981	(1919–1989): Vice Chief of Staff of the United States Air Force, 1973–1975.; Commander-in-Chief of The United States Air Forces in Europe 1975–1977.
10	Gen Bennie L. Davis		1 August 1981	31 July 1985	(1928–2012)
11	Gen Larry D. Welch		1 August 1985	22 June 1986	(born 1934): Vice Chief of Staff of the United States Air Force (1984-1985); Chief of Staff of the United States Air Force (1986-1990)
12	Gen John T. Chain Jr.		22 June 1986	24 January 1991	(1934–2021)
13	Gen George Lee Butler		25 January 1991	1 June 1992	(born 1939): Commander-in-Chief of The United States Strategic Command (USCINCSTRAT), 1992–1994.

Three out of the Thirteen Commanders-in-Chief of the Strategic Air Command later on served as Chief of Staff of the United States Air Force, General Curtis LeMay, General John D. Ryan and General Larry D. Welch.

== List of SAC Vice Commanders-in-Chief ==
Vice Commander-in-Chief, United States Air Force Strategic Air Command
- Inaugural holder: Maj Gen St. Clair Streett
- Formation: 21 March 1946
- Final holder: Lt Gen Leo W. Smith II
- Abolished: 31 May 1992
- Succession: Air Combat Command

	Name	Term began	Term ended	Notes
1.	Maj Gen St. Clair Streett	21 March 1946	9 January 1947	(1893–1970); Designated as Deputy Commander
2.	Maj Gen Clements McMullen	10 January 1947	25 October 1948	(1892–1959); Designated as Deputy Commander
3.	Maj Gen Thomas S. Power	26 October 1948	14 April 1954	(1905–1970); Designated as Deputy Commander (1948–52); Vice Commander (1952–54)
4.	Lt Gen Francis H. Griswold	3 May 1954	30 June 1961	(1904–1989); Designated as Vice Commander (1954–55)
5.	Lt Gen John P. McConnell	1 July 1961	30 September 1962	(1908–1986)
6.	Lt Gen Hunter Harris Jr.	1 October 1962	31 July 1964	(1909–1987)
7.	Lt Gen John Dale Ryan	1 August 1964	30 November 1964	(1915–1983)
8.	Lt Gen Joseph J. Nazzaro	1 December 1964	31 January 1967	(1913–1990)
9.	Lt Gen Keith K. Compton	1 February 1967	31 July 1969	(1915–2004)
10.	Lt Gen Glen W. Martin	1 August 1969	30 September 1973	(1916–1994)
11.	Lt Gen James M. Keck	1 October 1974	30 June 1977	(1921–2018)
12.	Lt Gen James E. Hill	1 August 1977	5 December 1977	(1921–1999)
13.	Lt Gen Edgar S. Harris Jr.	6 December 1977	27 June 1978	(1925–2018)
13.	Lt Gen Lloyd R. Leavitt Jr.	28 June 1978	31 August 1981	(1928–2016)
13.	Lt Gen George D. Miller	1 September 1981	31 August 1984	(born 1930)
13.	Lt Gen William J. Campbell	31 August 1984	26 July 1985	(1931–2017)
13.	Lt Gen Monroe W. Hatch Jr.	27 July 1985	29 January 1987	(born 1933)
13.	Lt Gen Kenneth L. Peek Jr.	30 January 1987	9 September 1988	(born 1932)
13.	Lt Gen Donald O. Aldridge	9 September 1988	30 May 1991	(born 1932)
13.	Lt Gen Leo W. Smith II	1 June 1991	1 June 1992	(born 1936)

== See also ==
- United States Strategic Air Command
