= Brett James McMullen =

American general

- Military career
- Allegiance: United States of America
- Branch: United States Air Force
- Service years: 1981 - 2018
- Rank: Brigadier General
- Awards: Distinguished Service Medal; Bronze Star Medal

Brett James McMullen is a retired brigadier general in the United States Air Force. He joined the Air Force as an enlisted serviceman in 1981, and received a commission as a second lieutenant in 1985. He worked his way up through the ranks, finally obtaining the rank of brigadier general on April 3, 2014. He served as the last Commanding General of the (CENTCOM) Joint Theater Support Contracting Command (C-JTSCC) at Bagram Air Base, Afghanistan (2014–2015). He retired as the Mobilization Assistant to the Deputy Assistant Secretary of the Air Force for Contracting, Office of the Assistant Secretary of the Air Force for Acquisition. His responsibilities included all contracting for the Air Force, including weapon systems, logistical support, and all other forms of operational support.
