= Leo Smith (sculptor) =

American sculptor

- Born: 1947 (age 78–79); Winona, Minnesota
- Citizenship: America
- Occupation: Sculptor

Leo R. Smith (born 1947) is an American sculptor and folk artist from Winona, Minnesota, Minnesota. He works primarily in wood. Life on the Mississippi River, past and present, local people, and the flora & fauna provide inspiration for Smith's lifelike folk figures. His innovative work has been exhibited in museums, galleries and fine shops and has brought wide acclaim throughout the US. A collection of over 400 Leo Smith sculptures is displayed on a rotating basis at the Minnesota Marine Art Museum in Winona, MN.
