= Leo W. Smith II =

United States Air Force general

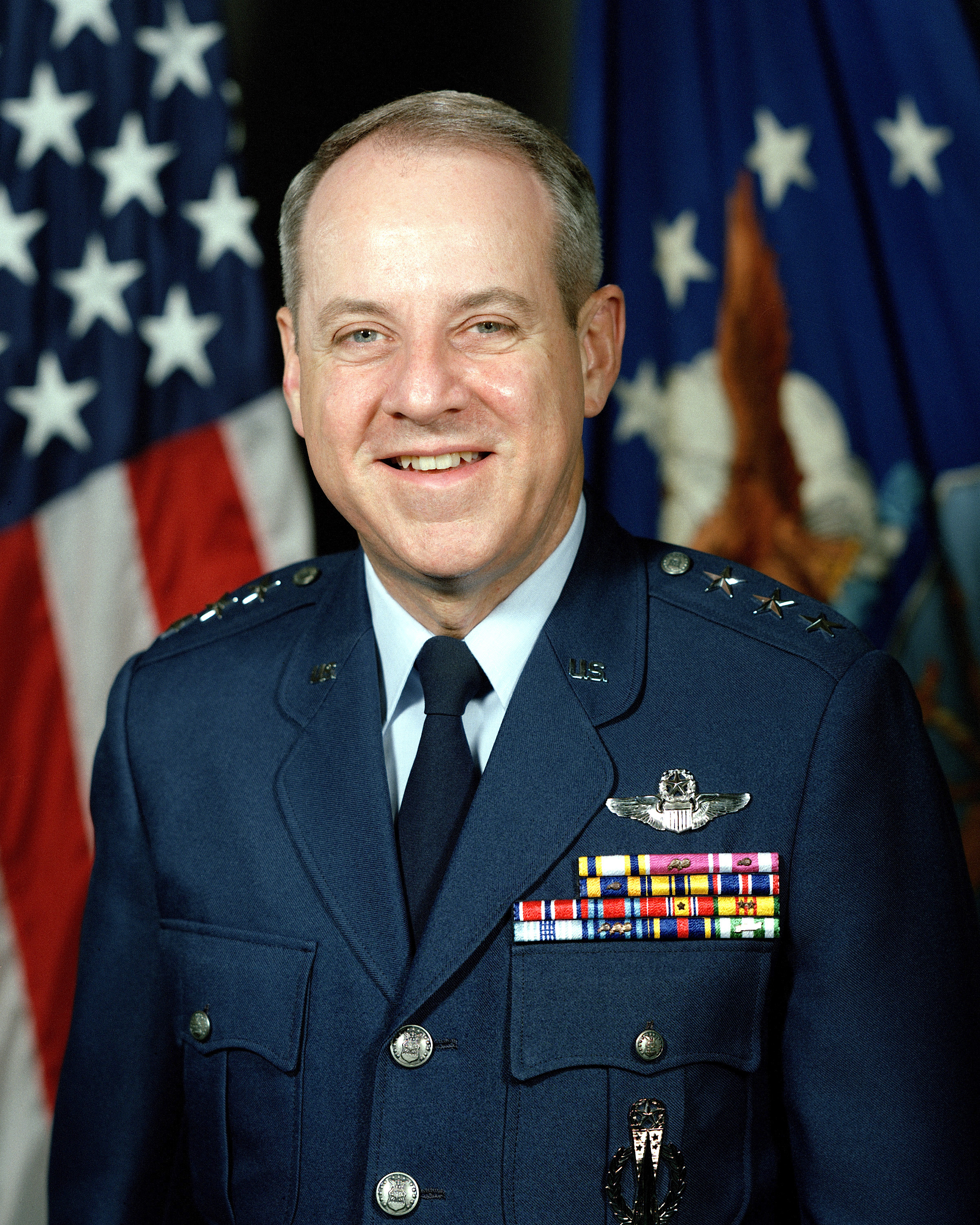
- Born: March 13, 1936 (age 90); Omaha, Nebraska, U.S.
- Military career
- Allegiance: United States of America
- Branch: United States Air Force
- Service years: 1950s–1992
- Rank: Lieutenant General
- Commands: Vice Commander-in-Chief, Strategic Air Command

Leo W. Smith II (born March 13, 1936) is a retired American Air Force lieutenant general whose last assignment was vice commander in chief, Strategic Air Command, headquartered at Offutt Air Force Base, Nebraska. He assumed this position June 1, 1991 and served until June 1, 1992.

== Biography ==
Smith was born March 13, 1936, in Omaha, Nebraska, and graduated from Dowling High School, Des Moines, Iowa, in 1954. He earned a Bachelor of Science degree in military engineering from the U.S. Military Academy in 1958 and a Master of Science degree in government from Southern Illinois University in 1971. He completed Squadron Officer School in 1962, Air Command and Staff College in 1972, Naval Command and Staff College as a distinguished graduate in 1973, and the Department of State Senior Seminar in Foreign Policy in 1977. He also attended Cornell University's Executive Development Program Course in 1979, and John F. Kennedy School of Government's Program for Senior Managers in Government in 1987.

After completing pilot training, nuclear weapons school, survival school and B-52 upgrade training, Smith was assigned to Loring Air Force Base, Maine, as a B-52G co-pilot. A volunteer for the Minuteman missile program, he completed missile training at Chanute Air Force Base, Ill., and was assigned to Malmstrom Air Force Base, Montana, in October 1962. While there he served as a deputy missile combat crew commander at squadron level and in the wing Standardization Division. In April 1965 he transferred to the 15th Air Force Missile Training and Standardization Division at March Air Force Base. Smith completed C-130 Hercules training at Sewart Air Force Base, Tennessee, in July 1966 and then was assigned to the 314th Tactical Airlift Wing, Ching Chuan Kang Air Base, Taiwan, as a co-pilot. He later served as aircraft commander.

Upon his return to the United States in September 1967, he was assigned to Strategic Air Command headquarters, initially as an operations planner on board the airborne command post, then as an air operations staff officer in the Future Concepts Aircraft Branch, and finally as chief of the Future Concepts Missile Branch.

After graduating from the Naval Command and Staff College in July 1973, he became military assistant to the deputy director for defense research and engineering, strategic and space systems, Office of the Secretary of Defense, Washington, D.C. Smith entered the Senior Seminar in Foreign Policy conducted by the State Department's Foreign Service Institute in September 1976 and, upon completion in June 1977, was assigned as chief of the Strategic Offensive Forces Division, Directorate of Plans, Headquarters U.S. Air Force, Washington, D.C. After an Air Staff reorganization, he became assistant deputy director for strategy, doctrine and long-range planning in June 1978. With the creation of a Deputy Directorate for Long Range Planning, he became chief of the Planning and Integration Division.

In April 1979 he transferred to Castle Air Force Base, California, as vice commander of the 93rd Bombardment Wing and, in April 1980, assumed command of the wing. He became commander of SAC's 57th Air Division at Minot Air Force Base, N.D., in November 1981. This command included Strategic Projection Force responsibility as part of the Rapid Deployment Joint Task Force. In December 1982 he was assigned as assistant deputy chief of staff for plans at SAC headquarters. In July 1985 he returned to Air Force headquarters as director of budget. As part of the Goldwater-Nichols DOD Reorganization Act, Smith became deputy comptroller, budget, Office of the Secretary of the Air Force, in March 1987. In August 1988 he was assigned as assistant deputy chief of staff for plans and operations, Air Force headquarters. In August 1989 Smith became principal deputy assistant secretary of the Air Force, financial management (resource management), Washington, D.C. He assumed his present position in June 1991.

He is a command pilot with more than 4,600 flying hours. His military awards and decorations include the Distinguished Service Medal, Legion of Merit with two oak leaf clusters, Meritorious Service Medal with oak leaf cluster, Air Medal with oak leaf cluster, Air Force Commendation Medal, Air Force Outstanding Unit Award, Air Force Organizational Excellence Award, Combat Readiness Medal, National Defense Service Medal with two service stars, Vietnam Service Medal with two service stars, Air Force Overseas Ribbon-Short, Air Force Longevity Service Award Ribbon with seven oak leaf clusters, Air Force Training Ribbon and Republic of Vietnam Campaign Medal.

He was promoted to lieutenant general September 1, 1989, with same date of rank. He retired in 1992.
