= James M. Keck =

United States Air Force general

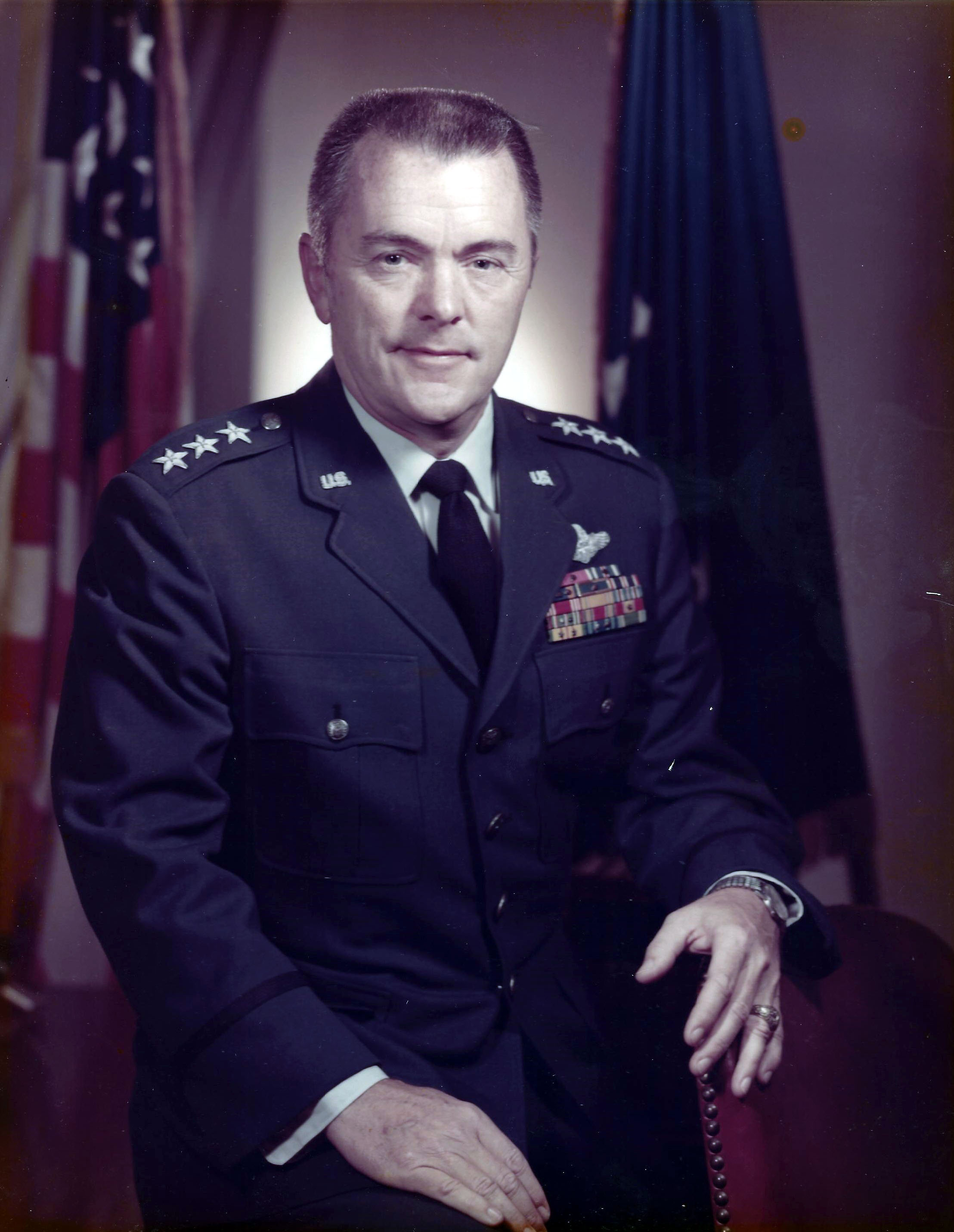
- Born: September 4, 1921; Scranton, Pennsylvania, U.S.
- Died: June 25, 2018 (aged 96); San Antonio, Texas, U.S.
- Burial place: West Point Cemetery
- Children: 3
- Military career
- Allegiance: United States of America
- Branch: United States Air Force
- Service years: 1943–1977
- Rank: Lieutenant General
- Commands: Second Air Force; Vice Commander-in-Chief, Strategic Air Command

James Moulton Keck (September 4, 1921 – June 25, 2018) was an American Air Force lieutenant general whose last assignment was vice commander in chief, Strategic Air Command, headquartered at Offutt Air Force Base, Nebraska. He assumed this position October 1, 1973 and served until June 30, 1977. He previously served as commander of 2nd Air Force, SAC's largest subordinate command which controls the majority of assigned B-52, KC-135, and FB-111 aircraft, as well as a portion of the Minuteman and Titan missiles.

== Biography ==
Keck was born in Scranton, Pennsylvania, in 1921. He attended high school in Cranston, Rhode Island, and Brown University in Providence. He entered the U.S. Military Academy at West Point, New York, in July 1940, and received a Bachelor of Science degree in engineering and a commission as a second lieutenant in the Army Air Corps in 1943. He graduated in the first class to receive pilot training at the academy.

During World War II, Keck completed two combat tours of duty as a B-24 pilot with the 8th Air Force in Europe, participating in all the campaigns of the 8th Air Force. After the war he served in many command and staff positions, including inspector general, comptroller, operations, intelligence, personnel, plans and materiel.

Keck graduated from the senior course of the Naval War College in Newport, Rhode Island, in 1952, and then was assigned on the staff of the commander in chief, Pacific. He went to Washington, D.C., in June 1955, where he first served on the Air Staff and then in the Office of the Secretary of Defense. He entered the National War College, Washington, D.C., in August 1959 and graduated in June 1960.

He served from June 1960 to June 1970 with the Strategic Air Command in tactical units employing B-47, B-52, KC-97 and KC-135 aircraft. He was commander of Pease Air Force Base, N.H., and the 465th Bombardment Wing at Robins Air Force Base, Ga. He served as inspector general and later as director of materiel for Headquarters 8th Air Force at Westover Air Force Base, Mass., and then as commander of the 72d Bombardment Wing at Ramey Air Force Base, Puerto Rico.

He assumed command of the 17th Strategic Aerospace Division at Whiteman Air Force Base, Mo., in July 1967. He was transferred to Strategic Air Command Headquarters at Offutt Air Force Base, Neb., in February 1968 as deputy chief of staff, comptroller and later became assistant deputy chief of staff for operations.

In June 1970 Keck was assigned to Headquarters U.S. Air Force as deputy director of operations and in January 1971 he became director of plans.

Keck took command of 2nd Air Force on May 1, 1972, and assumed his present position October 1, 1973.

His military decorations and awards include the Legion of Merit with oak leaf cluster, Distinguished Flying Cross with oak leaf cluster, and the Air Medal with three oak leaf clusters. He wears the Master Missileman Badge.

Keck was promoted to the grade of lieutenant general May 16, 1972, with same date of rank.

He died on June 25, 2018, in San Antonio, Texas. Was buried at the West Point Cemetery.
