= Clements McMullen =

United States Air Force general

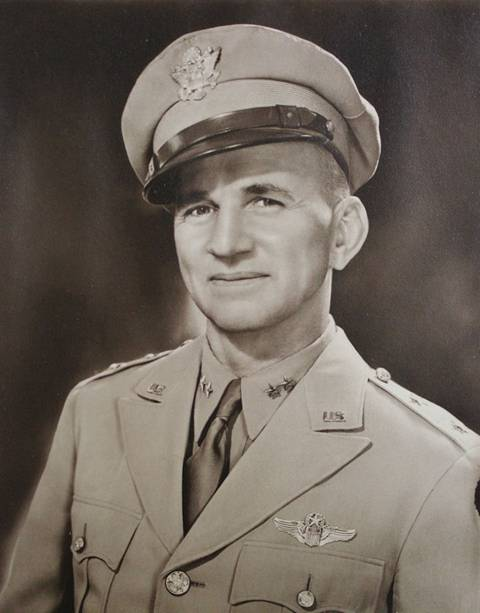
- Born: February 5, 1892; Largo, Florida
- Died: January 9, 1959 (aged 66); San Antonio, Texas
- Burial place: Fort Sam Houston National Cemetery, San Antonio, Texas
- Military career
- Allegiance: United States of America
- Branch: United States Air Force
- Service years: 1918–1954
- Rank: Major General
- Commands: Chief of Staff, PACUSA; Far East Air Service Command; Deputy Commander, Strategic Air Command

Clements McMullen (February 5, 1892 – January 9, 1959) was an American Air Force major general whose last assignment was deputy commander, Strategic Air Command, headquartered at Offutt Air Force Base, Nebraska. He assumed this position January 10, 1947 and served until October 25, 1948.

== Biography ==
McMullen was born in Largo, Florida, in 1892. He attended Washington and Lee University in Virginia and engaged in civil engineering in Florida for five years. He became a flying cadet on September 18, 1917, and was commissioned a second lieutenant in the Aviation Section, Signal Reserve on March 6, 1918.

Upon becoming a flying cadet, he entered the School of Military Aeronautics at the Georgia School of Technology. Upon receiving his commission in March 1918, he went to Kelly Field, Texas, to enter the School for Instructors. The following month he transferred to Gerstner Field, La., as a student in the pursuit course and instructor in combat flying.

In July 1918 he became Officer in Charge of Flying at the Gunnery School at Rockwell Field in California. He joined the 90th Aero Squadron at Eagle Pass, Texas, in July 1919 for border patrol duty. In November 1919 he transferred to Sanderson, Texas, for further border patrol duty with that squadron. He became a Flight Commander with the 1st Surveillance Group there in January 1920. He became Assistant Engineer Officer at the Montgomery Air Intermediate Depot in Alabama in January 1921. He went to Carlstrom Field, Florida, in December 1921 as the Officer in Charge of the Machine Shop and Motor Tests. In July 1922 he became Commanding Officer of the 62nd Service Squadron at Brooks Field, Texas. In September 1924 he was made Engineer Officer of the San Antonio Air Intermediate Depot in Texas. He went to Camp Nichols, Philippine Islands, in July 1926 for duty with the 2nd Observation Squadron. The following October he joined the 3rd Pursuit Squadron at Clark Field, Philippine Islands.

He returned to the United States in July 1928 to enter the Air Corps Engineering School at Wright Field, Ohio. Following his graduation in June 1929, he remained at Wright Field as Chief of the Repair Branch of the Experimental Engineering Section. He came Chief of the Power Plant Branch in April 1932. He entered the Air Corps Tactical School at Maxwell Field, Alabama, in September 1933. He graduated in June 1934 and remained there as post engineering officer. In March 1935 he became assistant to the operations and training officer, G-3, at the headquarters of the General Headquarters Air Force, Langley Field, Virginia. In July 1936 he became G-3 of the General Headquarters Air Force.

In August 1937 he entered the Command and General Staff School, Fort Leavenworth, Kansas. He graduated in June 1938 and then became chief engineering officer at the San Antonio Air Depot in Texas. In March 1941 he became commanding officer of the San Antonio Air Depot. He became commanding officer of the 3rd Air Service Area Command in January 1942 in Atlanta, Georgia. In August 1942 he was assigned to Headquarters, Air Service Command, Washington, D.C., as chief of the maintenance division. In December 1942 he was assigned to serve in that same capacity at Patterson Field, Ohio.

In October 1944 he was appointed commanding general of the Far East Air Service Command. He became Chief of Staff at PACUSA, with headquarters in Tokyo, in January 1946, returning to AAF headquarters in Washington, D.C., the following October. In November 1946, he took over the 8th Air Force at Fort Worth, Texas, and the following January was designated Deputy Commander of Strategic Air Command, with headquarters at Andrews Field, Md. In March he took over additional duty as Chief of Staff of SAC, retaining his position as Deputy Commander. He was rated a command pilot, combat observer and technical observer.

His decorations include Air Medal and Distinguished Service Medal with oak leaf cluster. He retired on February 28, 1954, and died in 1959. One of his sons, Thomas Henry McMullen was a lieutenant general in the Air Force.
