= William M. Fraser III =

US Air Force general

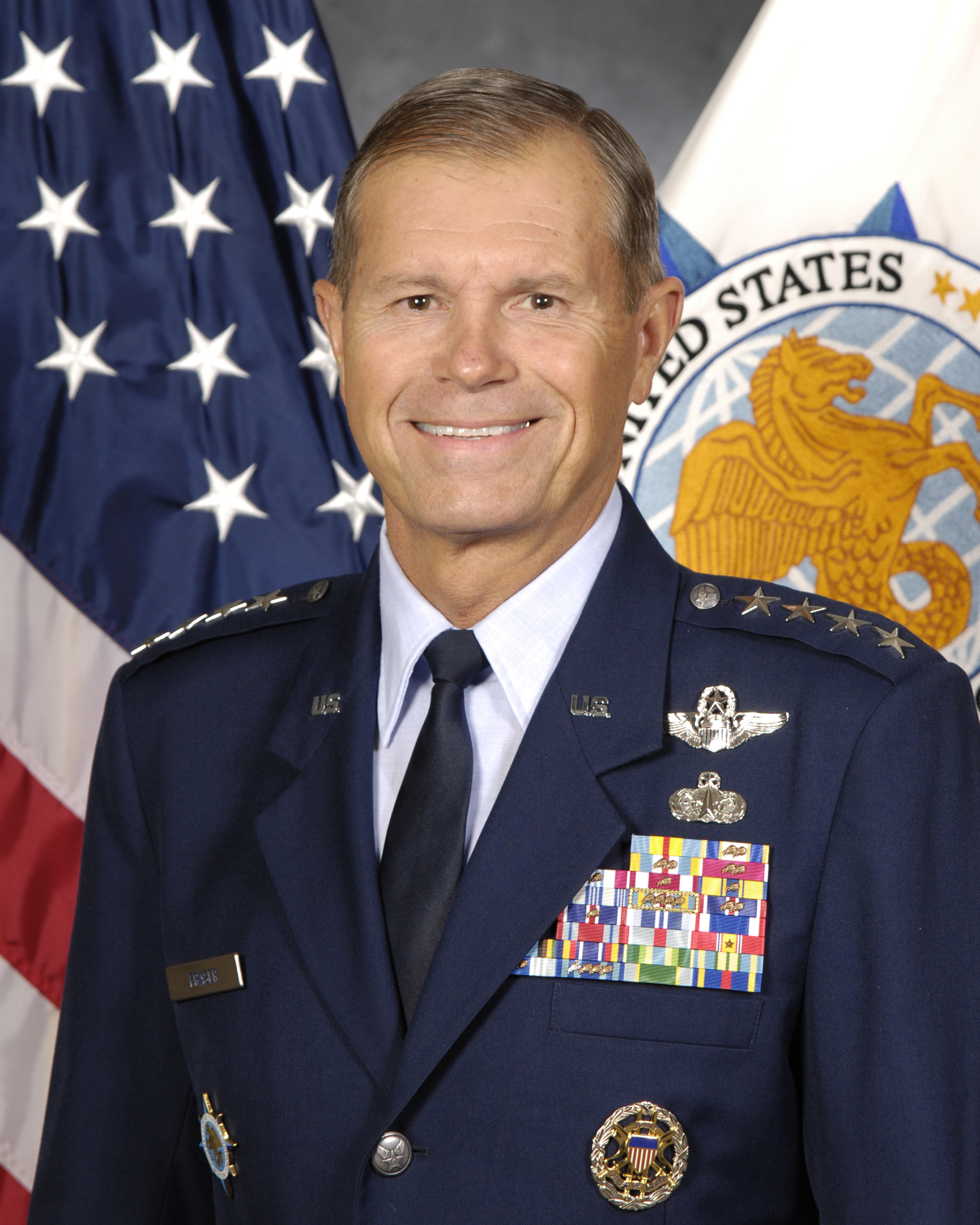
- General William M. Fraser III
- Born: August 17, 1952 (age 74); Lakeland, Florida, U.S.
- Military career
- Allegiance: United States
- Branch: United States Air Force
- Service years: 1974–2014
- Rank: General
- Commands: United States Transportation Command; Air Combat Command; Vice Chief of Staff of the Air Force; 2nd Bomb Wing; 28th Bomb Wing; 509th Operations Group
- Conflicts: Operation Southern Watch; Operation Desert Thunder; Operation Allied Force; War in Afghanistan
- Awards: Defense Distinguished Service Medal (2); Air Force Distinguished Service Medal (3); Defense Superior Service Medal (3); Legion of Merit (3)

General William M. Fraser III (born August 17, 1952) is a retired United States Air Force officer who served as Commander, United States Transportation Command. He previously served as Commander, Air Combat Command from September 10, 2009 to September 30, 2011, the 34th Vice Chief of Staff of the Air Force from 9 October 2008 to 27 August 2009, and as Assistant to the Chairman of the Joint Chiefs of Staff from May 2006 to 8 October 2008. As the Assistant to the CJCS, Fraser oversaw matters requiring close personal control by the Chairman, with particular focus on international relations and politico-military concerns. As commander of United States Transportation Command, Fraser was in charge of managing all global air, land and sea transportation. He retired on May 5, 2014.

== Military career ==
Fraser entered the United States Air Force in 1974 as a distinguished graduate of the Texas A&M University Air Force Reserve Officer Training Corps program. His operational assignments include duty as a T-37 Tweet instructor pilot and evaluator; B-52 Stratofortress aircraft commander, instructor and evaluator; and deputy commander of a B-1 Lancer operations group. General Fraser was the first Commander of the 509th Operations Group, then served as the Vice Wing Commander for the 509th Bomb Wing at Whiteman AFB, Mo. He commanded the 28th Bomb Wing at Ellsworth AFB, S.D., and 2nd Bomb Wing at Barksdale AFB, La. His staff duties include tours on the Air Staff, Joint Staff and Joint Strategic Target Planning Staff at Offutt AFB, Neb. He has also served as Chief of the Nuclear Requirements Cell at Supreme Headquarters Allied Powers Europe, and Chief of Staff for United States Strategic Command.

Fraser has extensive wartime, contingency and humanitarian relief operational experience. While serving as the special assistant to the Supreme Allied Commander, Europe, he orchestrated the deployment and operations of JSTARS in support of Operation Joint Endeavor in Bosnia, and also provided direct support to Operation Provide Comfort in Northern Iraq. Additionally, he oversaw the deployment of forces and subsequent withdrawal of 2,444 foreign and United States citizens from Liberia during Operation Assured Response. While commanding the 28th Bomb Wing, he conducted the first-ever deployment of B-1s as part of Operation Desert Thunder in Southwest Asia. He later commanded the 2nd Bomb Wing when they deployed B-52s for combat during Operation Noble Anvil and Operation Allied Force. The wing also deployed 300 personnel throughout Southwest Asia in support of Operation Southern Watch. As Deputy Director for Military Support, he led an intelligence fusion organization providing direct support to Operation Enduring Freedom.

== Education ==
- 1974 Bachelor of Science degree in engineering technology, Texas A&M University
- 1977 Squadron Officer School, Maxwell AFB, Ala.
- 1980 Master of Science degree in management information systems, University of Northern Colorado, Greeley
- 1983 Marine Corps Command and Staff College, Quantico, Va.
- 1985 Armed Forces Staff College, Norfolk, Va.
- 1987 National Security Management Course, Syracuse University, N.Y.
- 1991 Air War College, Maxwell AFB, Ala.
- 1995 Executive Development Program, Johnson Graduate School of Management, Cornell University, Ithaca, N.Y.
- 1999 Combined Force Air Component Commander Course, Maxwell AFB, Ala.
- 1999 Senior Information Warfare Applications Course, Maxwell AFB, Ala.
- 2000 National Security Leadership Course, National Security Studies, Maxwell School of Citizenship and Public Affairs, Syracuse University, N.Y.
- 2002 Executive Program for Russian and U.S. General Officers, John F. Kennedy School of Government, Harvard University, Cambridge, Mass.
- 2002 Joint Flag Officer Warfighting Course, Maxwell AFB, Ala.
- 2002 Senior Intelligence Fellows Program
- 2003 Program for Senior Executives in National and International Security, John F. Kennedy School of Government, Harvard University, Cambridge, Mass.
- 2005 Leadership at the Peak, Center for Creative Leadership, Colorado Springs, Colo.
- 2013 Pinnacle, Norfolk, Va.

== Assignments ==
1. November 1974 – October 1975, student, undergraduate pilot training, Williams AFB, Ariz.
2. October 1975 – March 1976, student, instructor pilot training, Randolph AFB, Texas
3. March 1976 – February 1978, T-37 instructor pilot and T-37 check pilot, 96th Flying Training Squadron, Williams AFB, Ariz.
4. March 1978 – March 1980, T-37 instructor pilot and flight examiner, 82nd Flying Training Wing, Williams AFB, Ariz.
5. March 1980 – October 1980, Operational Support Aircraft Program Element Monitor, Air Staff Training Program, Headquarters U.S. Air Force, Washington, D.C.
6. October 1980 – April 1981, Worldwide Military Command, Control and Communications Program Element Monitor, Air Staff Training Program, Headquarters U.S. Air Force, Washington, D.C.
7. May 1981 – October 1981, B-52H student, 4017th Combat Crew Training Squadron, Castle AFB, Calif.
8. October 1981 – March 1983, B-52H aircraft commander, later B-52G aircraft commander and instructor pilot, 46th Bomb Squadron, Grand Forks AFB, N.D.
9. March 1983 – December 1984, Chief, B-52G Standardization and Evaluation Branch, 319th Bomb Wing, Grand Forks AFB, N.D.
10. January 1985 – June 1985, student, Armed Forces Staff College, Norfolk, Va.
11. June 1985 – March 1986, Chief, European Single Integrated Operational Plan Tactics, Joint Strategic Target Planning Staff, Offutt AFB, Neb.
12. April 1986 – October 1987, executive officer to the SAC Chief of Staff, Headquarters SAC, Offutt AFB, Neb.
13. October 1987 – July 1990, Chief, Nuclear Requirements Cell, SHAPE, Mons, Belgium
14. July 1990 – July 1991, student, Air War College, Maxwell AFB, Ala.
15. July 1991 – July 1993, Deputy Commander, 384th Operations Group, McConnell AFB, Kan.
16. July 1993 – January 1995, Commander, 509th Operations Group, Whiteman AFB, Mo.
17. January 1995 – August 1995, Vice Commander, 509th Bomb Wing, Whiteman AFB, Mo.
18. August 1995 – January 1997, special assistant to the Supreme Allied Commander Europe, SHAPE, Mons, Belgium
19. February 1997 – May 1998, Commander, 28th Bomb Wing, Ellsworth AFB, S.D.
20. May 1998 – May 1999, Chief of Staff, U.S. Strategic Command, Offutt AFB, Neb.
21. May 1999 – December 2000, Commander, 2nd Bomb Wing, Barksdale AFB, La.
22. December 2000 – December 2002, Deputy Director for National Systems Operations, the Joint Staff; Director, Defense Space Reconnaissance Program; and Deputy Director for Military Support, National Reconnaissance Office, Washington, D.C.
23. January 2003 – October 2004, Director of Operations, Headquarters AETC, Randolph AFB, Texas
24. November 2004 – February 2005, special assistant to the Commander, Air Force Command and Control, Intelligence, Surveillance and Reconnaissance Center, Deputy Chief of Staff for Warfighting Integration, Langley AFB, Va.
25. February 2005 – May 2006, Vice Commander, Air Combat Command, Langley AFB, Va.
26. May 2006 – October 2008, Assistant to the Chairman of the Joint Chiefs of Staff, Washington, D.C.
27. October 2008 – September 2009, Vice Chief of Staff, Headquarters U.S. Air Force, Washington, D.C.
28. September 2009 – September 2011, Commander, Air Combat Command, Langley AFB, Va., and Air Component Commander for U.S. Joint Forces Command
29. October 2011 – May 2014, Commander, U.S. Transportation Command, Scott AFB, Ill.

== Flight information ==
- Rating: Command pilot
- Flight hours: More than 4,200
- Aircraft flown: T-37, T-38, T-1, KC-135R, B-1B, B-2A, B-52G/H and C-21

== Awards and decorations ==
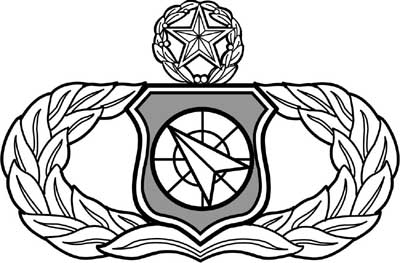
US Air Force Command Pilot Badge
Command Space and Missile Badge
Joint Chiefs of Staff Badge
United States Transportation Command Badge

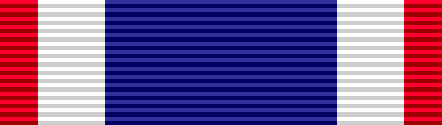
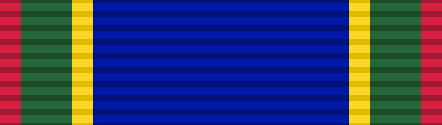
Defense Distinguished Service Medal with bronze oak leaf cluster
Air Force Distinguished Service Medal with two bronze oak leaf clusters
Defense Superior Service Medal with two bronze oak leaf clusters
Legion of Merit with two bronze oak leaf clusters
Defense Meritorious Service Medal with bronze oak leaf cluster
Meritorious Service Medal with bronze oak leaf cluster
Air Force Commendation Medal with bronze oak leaf cluster
Air Force Achievement Medal
Joint Meritorious Unit Award with silver oak leaf cluster
Air Force Outstanding Unit Award with two bronze oak leaf clusters
Air Force Organizational Excellence Award with bronze oak leaf cluster
National Intelligence Medal of Achievement
Secretary's Distinguished Service Award
National Reconnaissance Office Distinguished Service Medal (Gold Medal)
Combat Readiness Medal
Air Force Recognition Ribbon
National Defense Service Medal with bronze service star
Armed Forces Expeditionary Medal
Global War on Terrorism Service Medal
Armed Forces Service Medal
Military Outstanding Volunteer Service Medal
Air Force Overseas Long Tour Service Ribbon with bronze oak leaf cluster
Air Force Longevity Service Award with silver and three bronze oak leaf clusters
Small Arms Expert Marksmanship Ribbon
Air Force Training Ribbon
Order of Viesturs, Military Grand Cross (Latvia)

== Other achievements ==
- Officer training award, undergraduate pilot training
- Top graduate, T-37 pilot instructor training
- T-37 Instructor Pilot of the Year
- Distinguished graduate, B-52 G/H combat crew training
- Air Force Public Affairs Directors Special Achievement Award for commander support
- Joseph A. Moller Award, Outstanding Wing Commander, ACC
- Honorary Tuskegee Airman
- Order of the Sword, Air Combat Command
- Air Force 2013 Gray Eagle

== Effective dates of promotion ==
Promotions
Insignia	Rank	Date
	General	October 8, 2008
	Lieutenant General	February 3, 2005
	Major General	October 1, 2003
	Brigadier General	January 1, 2000
	Colonel	January 1, 1992
	Lieutenant Colonel	June 1, 1988
	Major	October 1, 1983
	Captain	November 8, 1978
	First Lieutenant	November 8, 1976
	Second Lieutenant	November 8, 1974

Military offices
Preceded by Raymond T. Odierno	Assistant to the Chairman of the Joint Chiefs of Staff; 2006-2008	Succeeded by Paul J. Selva
Preceded by Duncan McNabb	Vice Chief of Staff of the United States Air Force; 2008–2009	Succeeded by Carrol Chandler
Preceded by John D. W. Corley	Commander of the Air Combat Command; 2009–2011	Succeeded by Gilmary M. Hostage III
Preceded by Duncan McNabb	Commander of the United States Transportation Command; 2011–2014	Succeeded by Paul J. Selva
