= John D. W. Corley =

US Air Force general

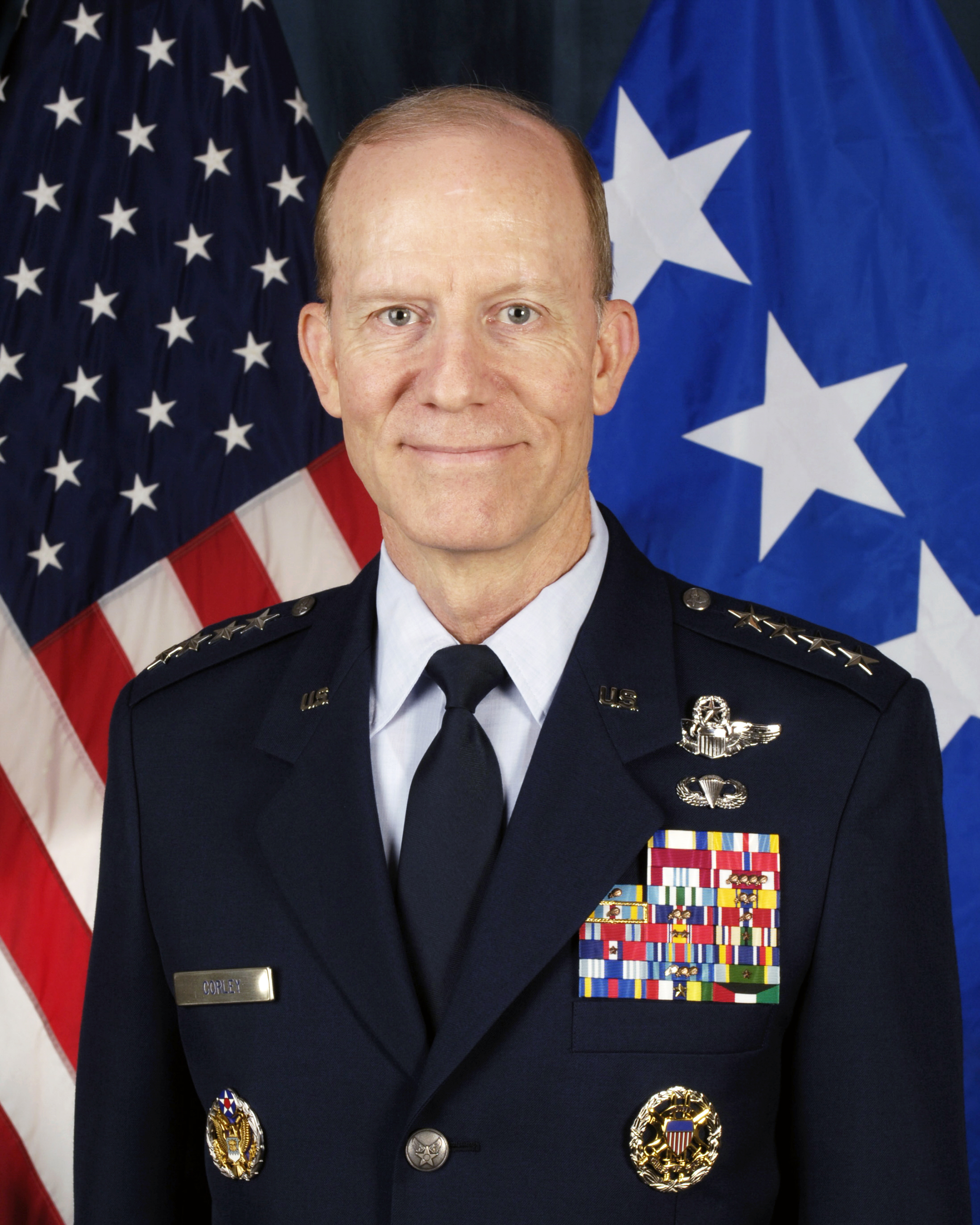
- General John D.W. Corley
- Born: August 11, 1951 (age 75); San Marcos, Texas, U.S.
- Military career
- Allegiance: United States
- Branch: United States Air Force
- Service years: 1973–2009
- Rank: General
- Commands: Air Combat Command; Vice Chief of Staff, USAF; 355th Wing; 33d Operations Group; 8th Fighter Squadron
- Awards: Air Force Distinguished Service Medal (2); Defense Superior Service Medal; Legion of Merit; Bronze Star; Defense Meritorious Service Medal

John Donald Wesley Corley (born August 11, 1951) is a retired four-star general in the United States Air Force. He previously served as the commander of Air Combat Command from October 2007 to September 10, 2009, and as the 32nd Vice Chief of Staff of the Air Force from September 2005 to September 2007. He retired from the Air Force on November 1, 2009.

Corley was responsible for organizing, training, equipping and maintaining combat-ready forces for rapid deployment and employment while ensuring strategic air defense forces are ready to meet the challenges of peacetime air sovereignty and wartime defense. ACC operates more than 1,200 aircraft, 27 wings, 17 bases and more than 200 operating locations worldwide with 105,000 active-duty and civilian personnel. When mobilized, the Air National Guard and Air Force Reserve contribute more than 900 aircraft and 56,000 people to Air Combat Command.

As the Combat Air Forces lead agent, ACC develops strategy, doctrine, concepts, tactics and procedures for air and space power employment. The command provides conventional, nuclear and information warfare forces to all unified commands to ensure air, space and information superiority for warfighters and national decision-makers. ACC can also be called upon to assist national agencies with intelligence, surveillance and crisis response capabilities.

Prior to his last assignment, General Corley was Vice Chief of Staff, Headquarters U.S. Air Force, Washington, D.C. As vice chief, he presided over the Air Staff and served as a member of the Joint Chiefs of Staff Requirements Oversight Council.

The son of Mettie Dean and Donald Wesley Corley, a United States Army Air Corps colonel, Corley entered the Air Force after graduating from the United States Air Force Academy in 1973. He earned his wings at Reese Air Force Base, Texas, in 1974. His aviation career includes more than 3,000 flying hours with combat experience. He has commanded at the squadron, group and wing levels. His staff positions comprise a mix of operational and joint duties in Tactical Air Command, Headquarters U.S. Air Force and the Joint Staff.

As Combined Air Operations Center director during Operation Enduring Freedom, Corley orchestrated more than 11,000 combat missions striking more than 4,700 targets, including 250 attacks against the Al Qaida and Taliban leadership. He directed the safe recovery of isolated personnel during the largest combat search and rescue mission in 50 years and was awarded the Bronze Star Medal.

== Education ==
- 1973 Bachelor of Science degree in engineering, U.S. Air Force Academy, Colorado Springs, Colorado
- 1978 Squadron Officer School, by correspondence
- 1984 Master's degree in business administration, University of the Philippines, Manila
- 1985 Air Command and Staff College, by correspondence
- 1986 College of Naval Command and Staff, Newport, Rhode Island
- 1986 Master's degree in national security and strategic studies, Naval War College, Newport, Rhode Island
- 1993 U.S. Army War College, Carlisle Barracks, Pennsylvania
- 1999 Russian and U.S. General Officer Executive Program, Harvard University, Cambridge, Massachusetts
- 2002 Program for Senior Executives in National and International Security, John F. Kennedy School of Government, Harvard University, Cambridge, Massachusetts

== Assignment ==
- October 1973 – November 1974, student, undergraduate pilot training, Reese AFB, Texas
- December 1974 – December 1978, T-38 instructor pilot and flight examiner, 64th Flying Training Wing, Reese AFB, Texas
- January 1979 – July 1982, F-15 instructor pilot and flight examiner, 49th Tactical Fighter Wing, Holloman AFB, New Mexico
- August 1982 – July 1985, F-5 instructor pilot and flight commander, C Flight, 26th Aggressor Squadron, Clark Air Base, Philippines
- August 1985 – August 1986, student, College of Naval Command and Staff, Newport, Rhode Island
- September 1986 – May 1988, chief analyst, Advanced Tactical Fighter, Air Force Center for Studies and Analysis, Headquarters U.S. Air Force, Washington, D.C.
- June 1988 – March 1990, chief analyst, Commander's Action Group, Tactical Air Command, Langley AFB, Virginia
- April 1990 – April 1991, operations officer, 7th Fighter Squadron, Holloman AFB, New Mexico
- May 1991 – July 1992, commander, 8th Fighter Squadron, Holloman AFB, New Mexico
- August 1992 – July 1993, student, Army War College, Carlisle Barracks, Pennsylvania
- August 1993 – July 1995, deputy commander, later, Commander, 33rd Operations Group, Eglin AFB, Florida
- August 1995 – June 1997, chief of Western Hemisphere Division, Directorate of Strategic Plans and Policy, J-5, the Joint Staff, Washington, D.C.
- June 1997 – May 1999, commander, 355th Wing, Davis-Monthan AFB, Arizona
- June 1999 – September 2000, director of studies and analysis, Headquarters U.S. Air Forces in Europe, Ramstein AB, Germany
- September 2000 – March 2003, director of global power programs, Assistant Secretary of the Air Force for Acquisition, Headquarters U.S. Air Force, Washington, D.C.
- March 2003 – August 2005, principal deputy, Assistant Secretary of the Air Force for Acquisition, and Military Director, U.S. Air Force Scientific Advisory Board, Headquarters U.S. Air Force, Washington, D.C.
- September 2005 – September 2007, Vice Chief of Staff, Headquarters U.S. Air Force, Washington, D.C.
- October 2007 – September 2009, commander, Air Combat Command, Langley AFB, Va., and Air Component Commander for U.S. Joint Forces Command

== Flight information ==
- Rating: Command pilot
- Flight hours: 3,100
- Aircraft flown: A/OA-10, F-5E/F, F-15A/B/C/D, T-38 and EC-130E/H

== Awards and decorations ==
Command Air Force Pilot Badge
Basic Parachutist Badge
Joint Chiefs of Staff Badge
Headquarters Air Force Badge

Air Force Distinguished Service Medal with one bronze oak leaf cluster
Defense Superior Service Medal
Legion of Merit
Bronze Star Medal
Defense Meritorious Service Medal
Meritorious Service Medal with four bronze oak leaf clusters
Aerial Achievement Medal with bronze oak leaf cluster
Joint Service Commendation Medal
Air Force Commendation Medal with two bronze oak leaf clusters
Joint Meritorious Unit Award with bronze oak leaf cluster
Air Force Outstanding Unit Award with two bronze oak leaf clusters
Air Force Organizational Excellence Award with bronze oak leaf cluster
Combat Readiness Medal
National Defense Service Medal with two bronze service stars
Southwest Asia Service Medal with bronze service star
Kosovo Campaign Medal with bronze service star
Global War on Terrorism Expeditionary Medal
Global War on Terrorism Service Medal
Air Force Overseas Long Tour Service Ribbon
Air Force Longevity Service Award with silver and three bronze oak leaf clusters
Small Arms Expert Marksmanship Ribbon with bronze service star
Air Force Training Ribbon
Inter-American Defense Board Medal with gold service star
Kuwait Liberation Medal (Kuwait)

== Effective dates of promotion ==
Promotions
Insignia	Rank	Date
	General	November 1, 2005
	Lieutenant General	May 1, 2003
	Major general	April 1, 2002
	Brigadier general	August 1, 1999
	Colonel	February 1, 1994
	Lieutenant colonel	September 1, 1989
	Major	May 24, 1986
	Captain	June 6, 1977
	First lieutenant	June 6, 1975
	Second lieutenant	June 6, 1973

== Personal ==
Corley is the son of Donald Wesley Corley and Mettie Virginia Dean. He married Margaret Mary LaPaglia on July 21, 1976.

Military offices
Preceded by Gen. T. Michael Moseley	Vice Chief of Staff of the United States Air Force; 2005 - 2007	Succeeded by Gen. Duncan J. McNabb
Preceded by Gen. Ronald Keys	Commander, Air Combat Command; 2007 - 2009	Succeeded by Gen. William M. Fraser III
