= Duncan McNabb =

US Air Force general (born 1952)

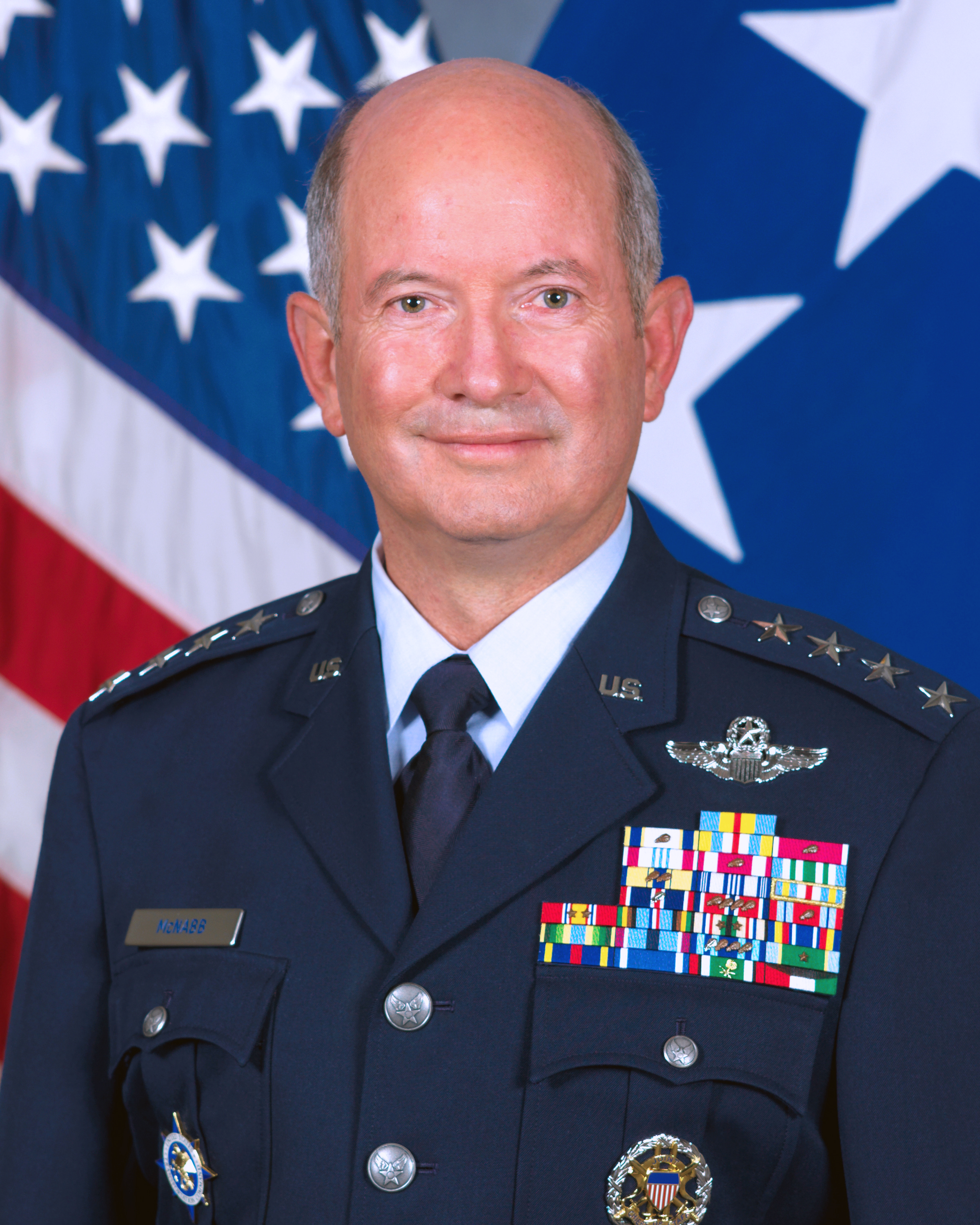
- Born: August 8, 1952 (age 74); Shaw Field, South Carolina, U.S.
- Military career
- Allegiance: United States
- Branch: United States Air Force
- Service years: 1974–2011
- Rank: General
- Commands: United States Transportation Command; Vice Chief of Staff of the United States Air Force; Air Mobility Command; Tanker Airlift Control Center; 62nd Airlift Wing; 89th Operations Group; 41st Military Airlift Squadron
- Conflicts: Gulf War
- Awards: Defense Distinguished Service Medal (2); Air Force Distinguished Service Medal (3); Defense Superior Service Medal; Legion of Merit (2)

Duncan J. McNabb (born August 8, 1952) is a retired United States Air Force general who last served as the ninth commander, United States Transportation Command from September 5, 2008, to October 17, 2011. He previously served as the 33rd Vice Chief of Staff of the Air Force.

== Military career ==
McNabb graduated from the United States Air Force Academy in 1974. A command pilot, he has amassed more than 5,400 flying hours in transport and rotary wing aircraft. He has held command and staff positions at squadron, group, wing, major command and Department of Defense levels. During Operation Desert Shield and Operation Desert Storm, McNabb commanded the 41st Military Airlift Squadron, which earned Military Airlift Command's Airlift Squadron of the Year in 1990. He commanded the 89th Operations Group, overseeing the air transportation of the United States' leaders, including the president, vice president, secretary of state and secretary of defense. He then served as commander of the 62nd Airlift Wing. The wing's performance in 1996 earned the Riverside Trophy as the 15th Air Force's outstanding wing. He also commanded the Tanker Airlift Control Center where he planned, scheduled and directed a fleet of more than 1,400 aircraft in support of combat delivery and strategic airlift, air refueling and aeromedical operations around the world. McNabb was then commander of Air Mobility Command, where he led 134,000 total force Airmen in providing rapid global mobility, aerial refueling, special airlift and aeromedical evacuation for America's armed forces.

McNabb's staff assignments have been a variety of planning, programming and logistical duties. These include serving as the deputy chief of staff for plans and programs on the Air Staff and chairman of the Air Force Board having oversight of all Air Force programs. He also served as the director for Logistics on the Joint Staff where he was responsible for operational logistics and strategic mobility support to the Chairman of the Joint Chiefs of Staff and the Secretary of Defense. General McNabb retired from the Air Force on November 30, 2011, after over 37 years of service.

== Later career ==
After retiring from the Air Force, McNabb and William Fraser III attempted to enter into consulting contracts with Azerbaijani cargo carrier Silk Way Airlines in 2014, with both standing to make $5,000 a day. However, their business ventures in Azerbaijan were flagged and ultimately blocked by the United States Department of Defense and State Department, considering their requests to be a threat to national security and a potential embarrassment if the information was ever made public. Documents of the dispute were eventually reported by The Washington Post in 2022.

== Education ==
- 1974 Bachelor of Science, United States Air Force Academy, Colorado Springs, Colorado
- 1977 Distinguished graduate, Squadron Officer School, Maxwell Air Force Base, Alabama
- 1983 Air Command and Staff College, by correspondence
- 1984 Master of Science degree in international relations, University of Southern California, Los Angeles, California
- 1993 Industrial College of the Armed Forces, Fort Lesley J. McNair, Washington, D.C.
- 1994 Air War College, by correspondence
- 1995 Program for Senior Officials in National Security, John F. Kennedy School of Government, Harvard University, Cambridge, Massachusetts
- 1998 Executive Program for General Officers of the Russian Federation and the United States, John F. Kennedy School of Government, Harvard University, Cambridge, Massachusetts
- 2000 National Security Decision-Making Seminar, Center for Strategic Education, Paul H. Nitze School of Advanced International Studies, Johns Hopkins University, Washington, D.C.

== Assignments ==
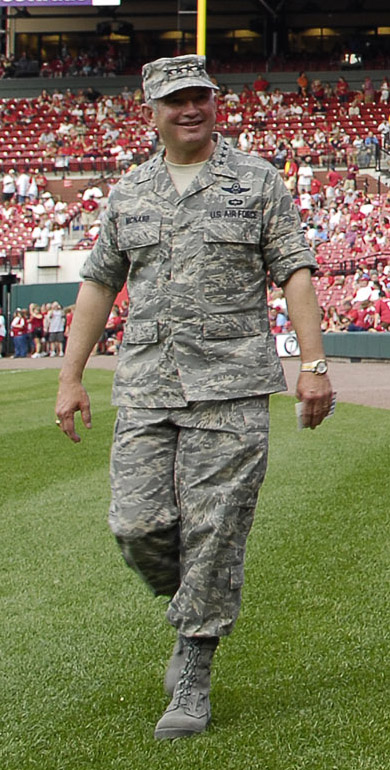
General McNabb in Airman Battle Uniform

1. June 1974 – May 1975, student, undergraduate navigator training, Mather Air Force Base, California
2. August 1975 – April 1978, instructor navigator, 14th Military Airlift Squadron, Norton Air Force Base, California
3. April 1978 – April 1979, airlift director, 63rd Military Airlift Wing, Norton Air Force Base, California
4. April 1979 – April 1980, student, undergraduate pilot training, Williams Air Force Base, Arizona
5. August 1980 – August 1983, instructor pilot and chief pilot, 14th Military Airlift Squadron, Norton Air Force Base, California
6. August 1983 – July 1984, general's aide, Air Force Inspection and Safety Center, Norton Air Force Base, California
7. July 1984 – June 1986, Chief, Plans Integration Branch, Headquarters Military Airlift Command, Scott Air Force Base, Illinois
8. June 1986 – June 1988, aide to the commander, United States Transportation Command and Military Airlift Command, Scott Air Force Base, Illinois
9. June 1988 – November 1990, chief pilot, later, operations officer, 17th Military Airlift Squadron, Charleston Air Force Base, South Carolina
10. November 1990 – January 1992, commander, 41st Military Airlift Squadron, Charleston Air Force Base, South Carolina
11. January 1992 – August 1992, deputy group commander, 437th Operations Group, Charleston Air Force Base, South Carolina
12. August 1992 – June 1993, student, Industrial College of the Armed Forces, Fort Lesley J. McNair, Washington, D.C.
13. July 1993 – June 1995, chief, Logistics Readiness Center, the Joint Staff, Washington, D.C.
14. July 1995 – July 1996, commander, 89th Operations Group, Andrews Air Force Base, Maryland
15. July 1996 – July 1997, commander, 62d Airlift Wing, McChord Air Force Base, Washington
16. August 1997 – June 1999, commander, Tanker Airlift Control Center, Headquarters Air Mobility Command, Scott Air Force Base, Illinois
17. June 1999 – December 1999, deputy director of programs, Office of the deputy chief of staff for plans and Programs, Headquarters, United States Air Force, Washington, D.C.
18. December 1999 – April 2002, director of programs, Office of the deputy chief of staff for plans and Programs, Headquarters, United States Air Force, Washington, D.C.
19. April 2002 – July 2004, deputy chief of staff for plans and programs, Headquarters, United States Air Force, Washington, D.C.
20. August 2004 – October 2005, director for logistics, the Joint Staff, Washington, D.C.
21. October 2005 – September 2007, commander, Headquarters Air Mobility Command, Scott Air Force Base, Illinois
22. September 2007 – September 2008, Vice Chief of Staff, Headquarters, United States Air Force, Washington, D.C.
23. September 2008 – October 2011, commander, United States Transportation Command, Scott Air Force Base, Illinois

== Flight information ==
- Rating: Command Pilot, Navigator
- Flight hours: More than 5,400
- Aircraft flown: T-37, T-38, C-141, C-17, C-21, C-20 and UH-1N

== Awards and decorations ==
Personal decorations
Defense Distinguished Service Medal with bronze oak leaf cluster
Air Force Distinguished Service Medal with two bronze oak leaf clusters
Defense Superior Service Medal
Legion of Merit with bronze oak leaf cluster
Defense Meritorious Service Medal
Meritorious Service Medal with bronze oak leaf cluster
Joint Service Commendation Medal
Air Force Commendation Medal with two bronze oak leaf clusters
Air Force Achievement Medal
Unit awards
Joint Meritorious Unit Award with oak leaf cluster
Outstanding Unit Award with silver oak leaf cluster
Organizational Excellence Award with silver oak leaf cluster
Service awards
Combat Readiness Medal with bronze oak leaf cluster
Campaign and service medals
National Defense Service Medal with two bronze service stars
Armed Forces Expeditionary Medal
Southwest Asia Service Medal with two bronze service stars
Global War on Terrorism Service Medal
Armed Forces Service Medal
Humanitarian Service Medal
Service, training, and marksmanship awards
Air Force Longevity Service Award with silver and three bronze oak leaf clusters
Air Force Longevity Service Award (second ribbon to denote tenth award)
Small Arms Expert Marksmanship Ribbon with bronze service star
Air Force Training Ribbon
Foreign awards
NATO Medal for Former Yugoslavia
Kuwait Liberation Medal (Saudi Arabia)
Kuwait Liberation Medal (Kuwait)

Other accoutrements
US Air Force Command Pilot Badge
US Air Force Navigator Badge
Basic Parachutist badge
United States Transportation Command
Office of the Joint Chiefs of Staff Identification Badge

=== Other achievements ===
- Commander's Trophy, Undergraduate Pilot Training, Air Training Command
- Orville Wright Award for outstanding UPT graduate, Order of Daedalians
- Order of the Sword, Air Mobility Command

== Effective dates of promotion ==
Promotions
Insignia	Rank	Date
	General	December 1, 2005
	Lieutenant General	April 19, 2002
	Major General	February 26, 2001
	Brigadier General	July 27, 1998
	Colonel	January 1, 1993
	Lieutenant Colonel	June 1, 1989
	Major	October 1, 1985
	Captain	June 5, 1978
	First Lieutenant	June 5, 1976
	Second Lieutenant	June 5, 1974

Military offices
Preceded by John D.W. Corley	Vice Chief of Staff of the United States Air Force; 2007–2008	Succeeded by William M. Fraser III
Preceded by T. Michael Moseley	Chief of Staff of the United States Air Force; Acting; July – August 2008	Succeeded by Norton A. Schwartz
Preceded by Norton A. Schwartz	Commander, United States Transportation Command; 2008–2011	Succeeded by William M. Fraser III
