= Gilmary M. Hostage III =

United States Air Force general

Gilmary Michael Hostage III
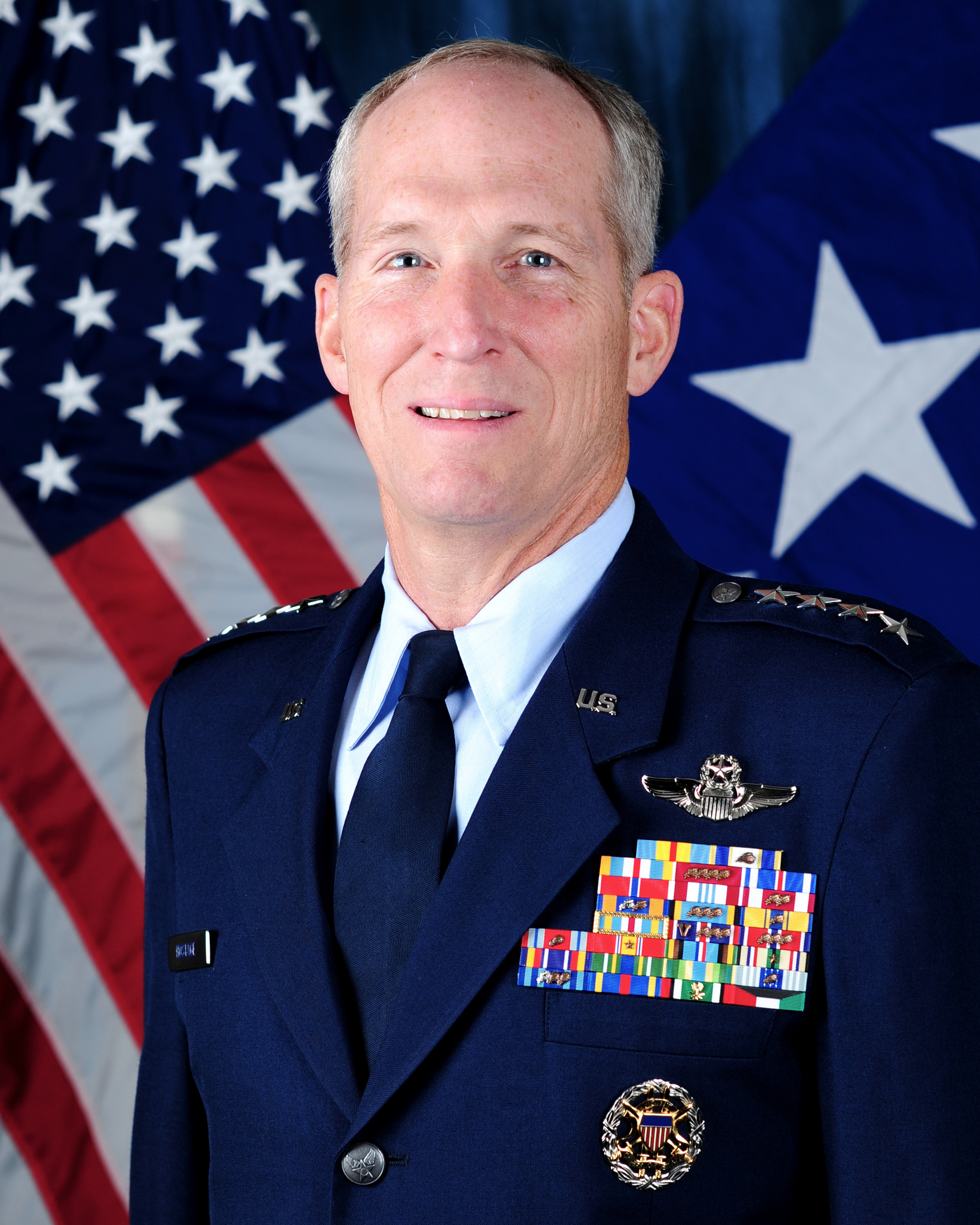
- General Gilmary Michael Hostage III
- Born: April 29, 1955 (age 71)
- Military career
- Allegiance: United States
- Branch: United States Air Force
- Service years: 1977–2014
- Rank: General
- Nickname: Mike
- Commands: Air Combat Command; United States Air Forces Central Command; 552d Air Control Wing; 363rd Air Expeditionary Wing; 388th Fighter Wing; 56th Operations Group; 71st Fighter Squadron
- Conflicts: Gulf War
- Awards: Defense Distinguished Service Medal; Air Force Distinguished Service Medal (2); Defense Superior Service Medal; Legion of Merit (5); Distinguished Flying Cross; Bronze Star Medal

Gilmary Michael "Mike" Hostage III (born April 29, 1955) is a retired United States Air Force (USAF) four-star general who last served as commander, Air Combat Command (ACC) from September 13, 2011, to October 2014. He previously served as commander, United States Air Forces Central, Southwest Asia. He retired from the USAF after over 37 years of service.

== Military career ==
As the commander of Air Combat Command, Hostage was responsible for organizing, training, equipping and maintaining combat-ready forces for rapid deployment and employment while ensuring strategic air defense forces are ready to meet the challenges of peacetime air sovereignty and wartime defense. ACC operates more than 1,000 aircraft, 22 wings, 13 bases, and more than 300 operating locations worldwide with 79,000 active-duty and civilian personnel. When mobilized, the Air National Guard and Air Force Reserve contribute more than 700 aircraft and 51,000 people to ACC. As the Combat Air Forces lead agent, ACC develops strategy, doctrine, concepts, tactics, and procedures for air- and space-power employment. The command provides conventional and information warfare forces to all unified commands to ensure air, space and information superiority for warfighters and national decision-makers. ACC can also be called upon to assist national agencies with intelligence, surveillance and crisis response capabilities.

As the Air Component Commander for United States Central Command, Hostage was responsible for developing contingency plans and conducting air operations in a 20-nation area of responsibility covering Central and Southwest Asia.

Hostage entered the air force through Air Force Reserve Officer Training Corps from Duke University in 1977 with a Bachelor of Science degree in mechanical engineering. He is also a graduate of the USAF Fighter Weapons School, and a command pilot with more than 4,000 flying hours. He has flown combat missions in multiple aircraft, logging more than 600 combat hours in operations Desert Shield, Desert Storm, Southern Watch, Enduring Freedom, Iraqi Freedom and New Dawn.

In May 2012, press reports indicated Hostage ordered pilots to fly the F-22 Raptor despite problems with its oxygen system. Hostage said that some of the problems the pilots encountered were simply limits of the human body, but that unmanned aerial vehicles were not suitable for the AirSea Battle concept of the Pacific Pivot.

Hostage has put forward the concept of a "combat cloud" for how manned and unmanned systems will work together in the USAF of the future.

In 2014 Hostage said that his plans to retire the A-10 Thunderbolt II fleet would put greater demands on USAF pilots and that their readiness was crucial. He also doubted the usefulness of the planned Combat Rescue Helicopter in a serious conflict against modern air defenses, and that it might be better to just use the V-22 Osprey.

== Education ==
- 1973 High School Diploma, Georgetown Preparatory School, North Bethesda, MD
- 1977 Bachelor of Science degree in mechanical engineering, Duke University, Durham, N.C.
- 1984 Squadron Officer School, Maxwell AFB, Ala.
- 1985 Air Command and Staff College, by seminar
- 1993 Air War College, Maxwell AFB, Ala.
- 1999 National Security Management Course, Syracuse University, N.Y.
- 2003 Combined Force Air Component Commander Course, Maxwell AFB, Ala.
- 2004 Joint Flag Officer Warfighting Course, Maxwell AFB, Ala.
- 2007 Combined Force Maritime Component Commander Course, Newport, R.I.

== Assignments ==
- February 1978 – July 1979, student, undergraduate pilot training, Vance AFB, Okla.
- July 1979 – July 1982, T-38 Talon instructor pilot, Vance AFB, Okla.
- July 1982 – January 1983, pilot, F-16A Replacement Training Unit, MacDill AFB, Fla.
- January 1983 – January 1985, operational fighter pilot, 388th Tactical Fighter Wing, Hill AFB, Utah
- January 1985 – June 1985, student, USAF Fighter Weapons School, Nellis AFB, Nev.
- June 1985 – June 1986, squadron weapons officer, 8th Tactical Fighter Wing, Kunsan AB, South Korea
- June 1986 – July 1987, F-16C operational test pilot, 422nd Test and Evaluation Squadron, Detachment 1, Luke AFB, Ariz.
- July 1987 – May 1989, aide to the Air Force Chief of Staff, Headquarters U.S. Air Force, Washington, D.C.
- May 1989 – September 1989, student, F-15C Conversion Training Course, Tyndall AFB, Fla.
- September 1989 – August 1992, assistant operations officer, 27th Tactical Fighter Squadron; operations officer, 71st Tactical Fighter Squadron; and Commander, 71st Fighter Squadron, Langley AFB, Va.
- August 1992 – June 1993, student, Air War College, Maxwell AFB, Ala.
- June 1993 – June 1995, political-military planner, Joint Staff, the Pentagon, Washington, D.C.
- June 1995 – June 1997, Commander, 56th Operations Group, Luke AFB, Ariz.
- June 1997 – April 1998, assistant director of operations, Headquarters ACC, Langley AFB, Va.
- April 1998 – January 2000, Commander, 388th Fighter Wing, Hill AFB, Utah
- January 2000 – July 2001, senior military assistant to the Secretary of the Air Force, Headquarters U.S. Air Force, Washington, D.C.
- July 2001 – August 2002, Commander, 363rd Air Expeditionary Wing, Prince Sultan AB, Saudi Arabia
- August 2002 – March 2004, Commander, 552nd Air Control Wing, Tinker AFB, Okla.
- March 2004 – October 2004, director of plans and programs, Headquarters Air Education and Training Command, Randolph AFB, Texas
- October 2004 – June 2006, Director of Intelligence and Air, Space and Information Operations (A2/3), Headquarters AETC, Randolph AFB, Texas
- June 2006 – March 2008, Director of Requirements and Integration (J8), Headquarters U.S. Joint Forces Command, Norfolk, Va.
- March 2008 – August 2009, Vice Commander, Pacific Air Forces, Hickam AFB, Hawaii
- August 2009 – August 2011, Commander, United States Air Forces Central Command, Southwest Asia
- September 2011 – October 2014, Commander, Air Combat Command, Langley AFB, Va.

== Flight Information ==
- Rating: Command pilot
- Flight hours: More than 4,000
- Aircraft flown: T-38, F-15A/B/C/D, F-16A/B/C/D/CJ, E-3B/C AWACS, MC-12W, F-22, and T-6A

== Awards and decorations ==
| Air Force Command Pilot Badge |
| Joint Chiefs of Staff Badge |

| Defense Distinguished Service Medal |
| Air Force Distinguished Service Medal with one bronze oak leaf cluster |
| Defense Superior Service Medal |
| Legion of Merit (with four bronze oak leaf clusters) |
| Distinguished Flying Cross |
| Bronze Star |
| Defense Meritorious Service Medal |
| Meritorious Service Medal (with two bronze oak leaf clusters) |
| Air Medal (with one silver and one bronze oak leaf cluster) |
| Aerial Achievement Medal (with three bronze oak leaf clusters) |
| Air Force Commendation Medal (with one bronze oak leaf cluster) |
| Joint Meritorious Unit Award |
| Air Force Outstanding Unit Award (with valor device and three bronze oak leaf clusters) |
| Air Force Organizational Excellence Award (with three bronze oak leaf clusters) |
| Combat Readiness Medal with oak leaf cluster |
| National Defense Service Medal (with one bronze service star) |
| Armed Forces Expeditionary Medal |
| Southwest Asia Service Medal (with one bronze service star) |
| Global War on Terrorism Service Medal |
| Korea Defense Service Medal |
| Armed Forces Service Medal |
| Air Force Overseas Short Tour Service Ribbon with oak leaf cluster |
| Air Force Longevity Service Award (with one silver and three bronze oak leaf clusters) |
| Air Force Training Ribbon |
| Foreign Operations Missions Medal (United Arab Emirates) |
| Kuwait Liberation Medal (Saudi Arabia) |
| Kuwait Liberation Medal (Kuwait) |

== Effective dates of promotion ==
- Second Lieutenant November 7, 1977
- First Lieutenant November 7, 1979
- Captain November 7, 1981
- Major March 1, 1987
- Lieutenant Colonel April, 1990
- Colonel February 1, 1994
- Brigadier General January 1, 2002
- Major General August 1, 2005
- Lieutenant General August 5, 2009
- General September 13, 2011
