= 71st Fighter Squadron =

71st Fighter Squadron

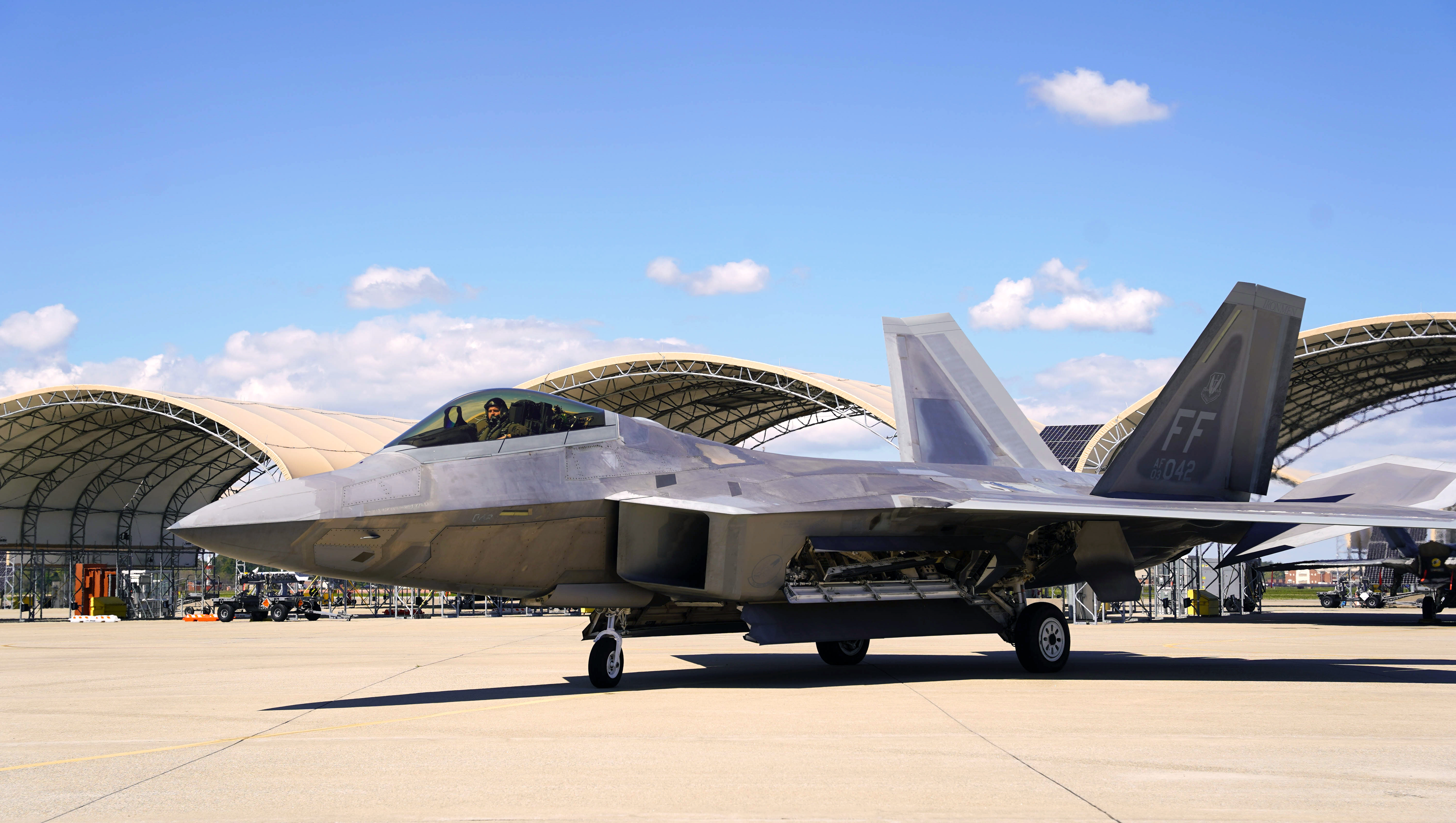
- Squadron F-22A Raptor at Langley AFB
- Active: 1940–1945; 1946–2010; 2015–present
- Country: United States
- Branch: United States Air Force
- Role: Fighter
- Part of: Air Combat Command: Fifteenth Air Force; 1st Fighter Wing; 1st Operations Group
- Garrison/HQ: Joint Base Langley–Eustis, Virginia
- Nickname: The Ironmen
- Engagements: World War II; Gulf War; Operation Southern Watch; Operation Noble Eagle; Operation Iraqi Freedom
- Decorations: Distinguished Unit Citation; Air Force Outstanding Unit Award

Commanders
- Current commander: Lt. Col. Andrew Gray
- Notable commanders: Ronald Keys

Insignia
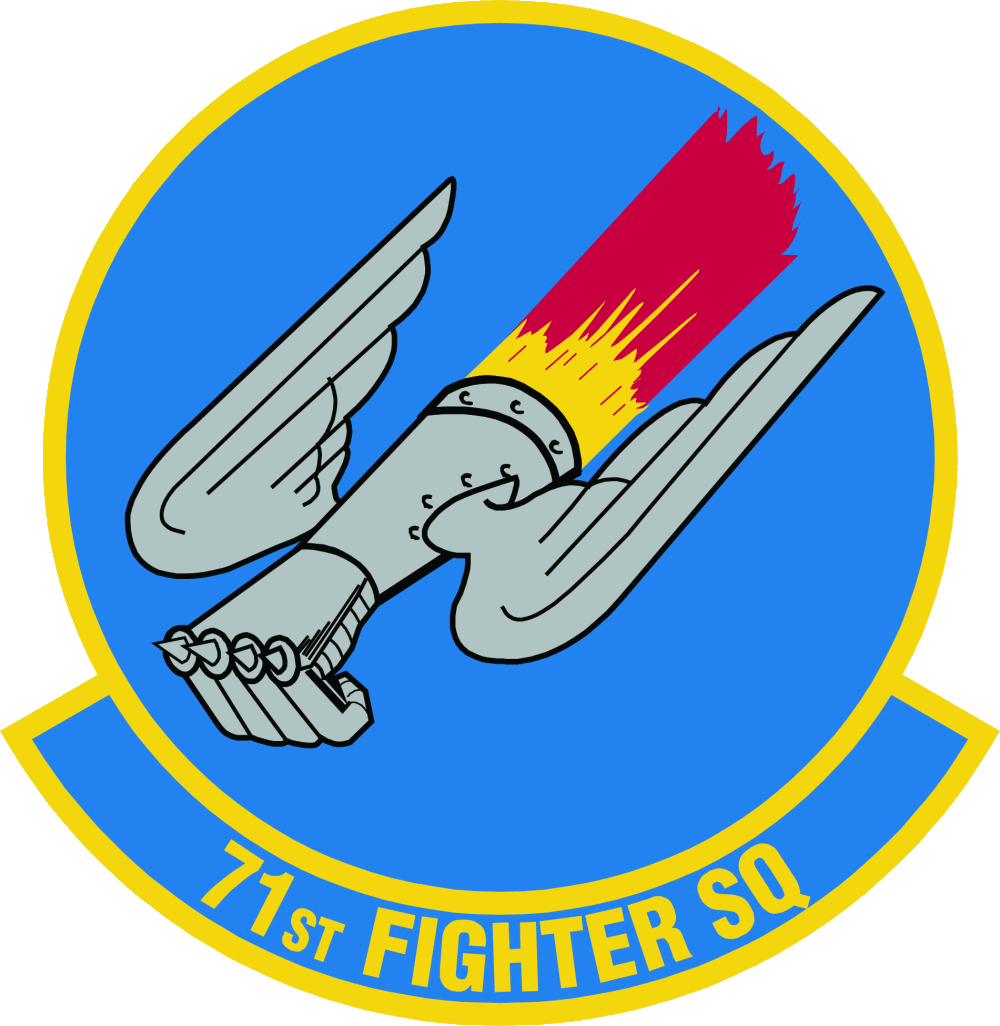
- 71st Fighter Squadron Emblem

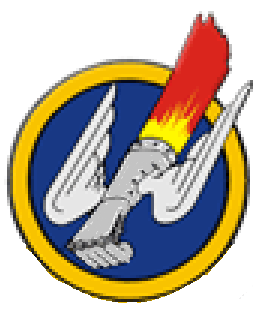
- 71 Fighter Sq emblem (Note: Approved 10 October 1947. Description: Over and through a medium blue disk with a yellow border, a winged mailed fist. Significance: The mailed fist symbolizes the solidarity of purpose of the 71st Fighter Squadron. The red flame represents valor. The blue background, the color of the sky, stands for honor and the golden ring represents unity of purpose. With changing USAF regulations all elements were brought within the disc.)

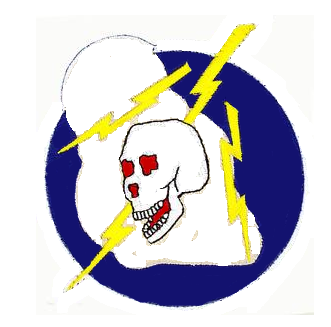
- 71st Fighter Squadron emblem (Note: World War II.)

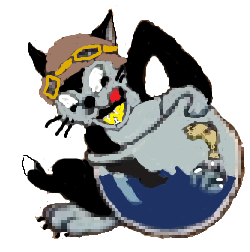
- 71st Pursuit Squadron emblem

The 71st Fighter Squadron is an active squadron of the United States Air Force, part of the 1st Operations Group of the 1st Fighter Wing. Stationed at Joint Base Langley–Eustis, Virginia, the squadron serves as a training unit, flying the Lockheed Martin F-22 Raptor.

First activated in 1941, the squadron served in the European theatre of World War II, the Vietnam War, the Gulf War, as well as the Iraq War.

== History ==
=== World War II ===
The 71st Fighter Training Squadron was activated in December 1940 as the 71st Pursuit Squadron (Interceptor) and assigned to the 1st Pursuit Group at Selfridge Field, Michigan, on 1 January 1941. Initial training was accomplished in the Seversky P-35. This was changed to the Republic YP-43 Lancer when the squadron was redesignated as the 71st Pursuit Squadron (Fighter) on 12 March 1941. The squadron gained proficiency in the aircraft and the anti-submarine mission while training on the Great Lakes. On 9 December 1941, just two days after the attack on Pearl Harbor, the squadron reported to NAS San Diego in defense of the important Southern California coast. Two months later, the 71st moved north to Los Angeles to transition to the Lockheed P-38 Lightning and was renamed the 71st Fighter Squadron. June 1942 saw the 71st become the first single-seat, twin engine fighter unit to deploy to England during World War II.

The 71st became the first P-38 unit in combat. Capt John D. Eiland was credited with the squadron's first-ever combat kill after downing a German Focke-Wulf Fw 190 on 4 December 1942. The pilots were continuously at the forefront of the air battles. Seventeen Campaign Participation Credits were awarded to the 71st and they earned three Distinguished Unit Citations. The squadron claimed 102 kills and produced five aces, including one pilot who became an ace in one mission. The 71st Squadron flew under the "Cragmore" callsign during World War II, and its original patch included a skull with lightning bolts in the shape of 71. In June 1943, General Carl Spaatz and General James H. Doolittle traveled to their UK base to present decorations earned in combat. This award ceremony was soon followed by Distinguished Unit Citations presented on 25 August 1943 and 30 August 1943 for escort missions against Italian targets. The squadron was presented another Distinguished Unit Citation by General Nathan Twining in May 1944 for an escort of B-17s against oil installations at Ploieşti, Romania. On 10 June 1944, during an otherwise disastrous low-level bombing mission against the oil refineries by two groups of P-38s, 2nd Lt Herbert "Stub" Hatch Jr. achieved 5 kills in one mission, all within one minute, causing the gun barrels of his P-38 to melt. Upon completion of its tour in Europe, the squadron was inactivated in Italy on 16 October 1945.

=== Air Defense Command ===
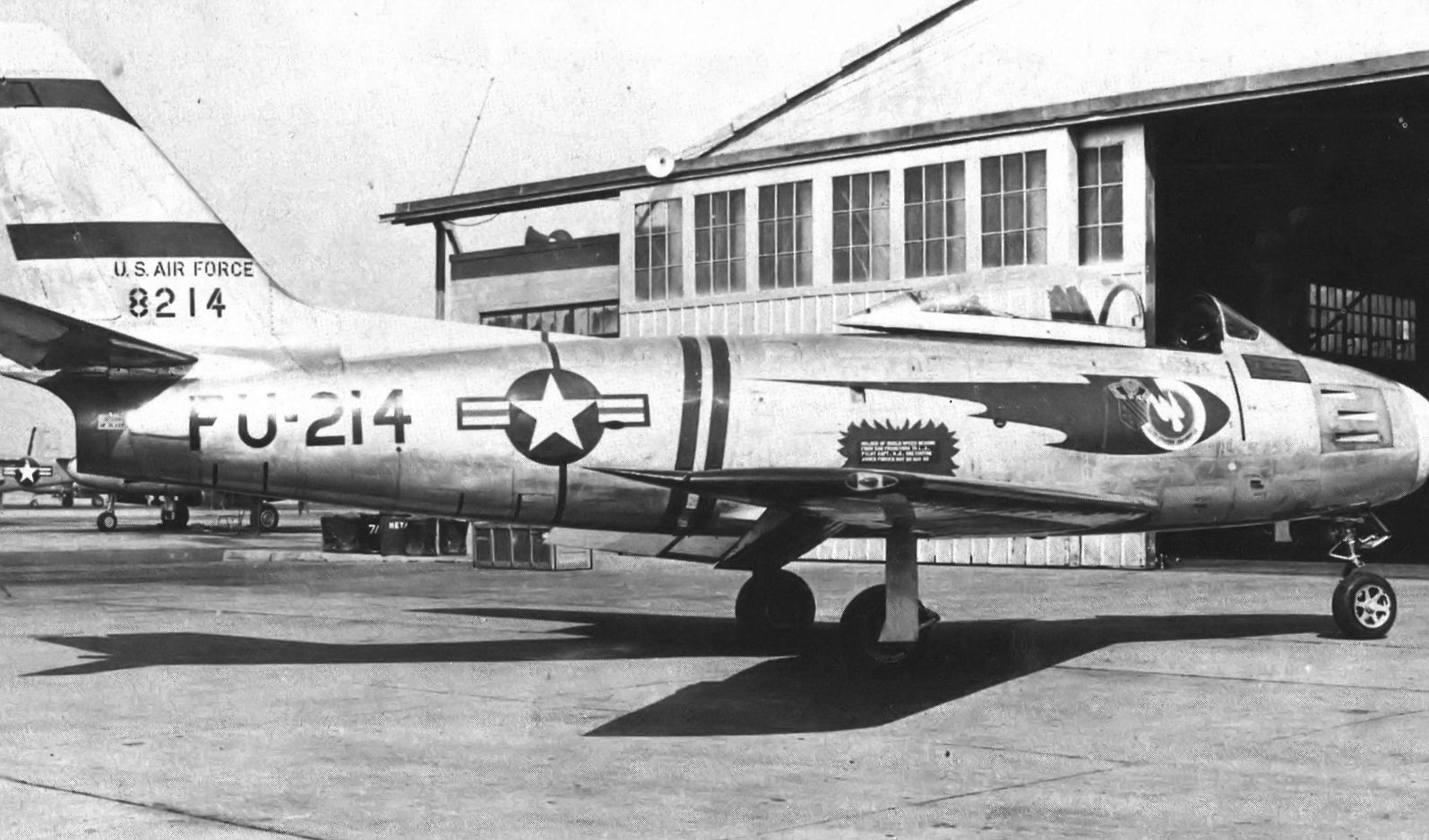
North American F-86A Sabre, at Griffiss AFB, New York, 1950

On 3 July 1946 the 71st was reactivated as part of the 1st Fighter Group at March Field, California where it took over the personnel, mission and new Lockheed P-80 Shooting Stars of the 31st Fighter Squadron, which was inactivated. The squadron flew the P-80 until 1949 when it converted to North American F-86A Sabre swept-wing fighters. The following year, as Air Defense Command (ADC) began to deploy its fighter force the squadron was detached from the group and moved twice, finally locating at Greater Pittsburgh Airport, Pennsylvania in October. However ADC was having difficulty under the existing wing base organizational structure in deploying fighter squadrons to best advantage. As a result, the squadron was reassigned to the geographically oriented 4708th Defense Wing and support elements at Greater Pittsburgh were organized into the 81st Air Base Squadron.

In 1953 ADC again reorganized its deployed squadrons and organized the 500th Air Defense Group at Pittsburgh, with the 71st becoming its operational element. In the summer of 1955 ADC implemented Project Arrow, which was designed to bring back on the active list the fighter units which had compiled memorable records in the two world wars. As a result, the 71st moved on paper to Selfridge Air Force Base, Michigan, where it was reunited with the 1st Fighter Group.

At Selfridge, the squadron re-equipped with rocket armed and airborne intercept radar equipped North American F-86D Sabres. In 1957 it began upgrading to the North American F-86L Sabre, an improved version of the F-86D which incorporated data link to communicate directly with the Semi Automatic Ground Environment, or SAGE analog computer-controlled direction system for intercepts. The 71st then converted to the supersonic Convair F-102 Delta Dagger interceptor from 1958 to 1960 and the Convair F-106 Delta Dart from 1960 to 1971.

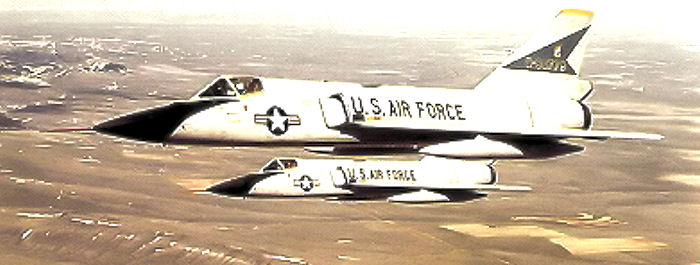
F-106s of the 71st Fighter-Interceptor Squadron, about 1970

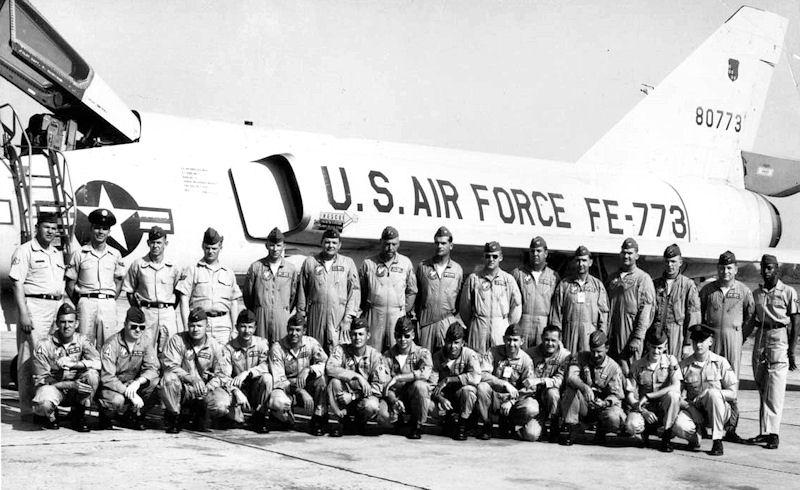
Squadron personnel photo, about 1964. F-106 58–0773 in background

In 1965, the unit won the F-106 category in the William Tell Interceptor Competition. In December 1969, the 71st was awarded the 1969 Hughes Achievement Award, presented annually to the most outstanding fighter interceptor squadron (Note: The criterion was later changed to the most outstanding air superiority squadron.) for the first time. in the United States Air Force. In 1970, an F-106 of the 71st glided onto a field in Montana and subsequently became known as the Cornfield Bomber. In 1970, the 71st won the William Tell Competition taking the F-106 category and the overall category for the first time for an F-106 unit.

=== Tactical Air Command ===
A major change occurred in July 1971 which encompassed changing aircraft, location, and designation. The squadron was redesignated as the 71st Tactical Fighter Squadron and joined the Tactical Air Command (TAC) with the 1st Tactical Fighter Wing at MacDill Air Force Base, Florida. It was there that the 71st was equipped with the McDonnell F-4E Phantom II aircraft. During the time the squadron was at MacDill it trained combat fighter crews in the complex F-4 weapon system for deployment to tactical units stationed worldwide. Graduates of the 71st participated in the final operations against North Vietnam which terminated the war in Southeast Asia. While graduating over 370 fighter crew members the 71st received three consecutive TAC Unit Achievement Awards for a record 4 years of accident-free flying through October 1974. In July 1975, the 71st moved with the 1st Tactical Fighter Wing to Langley Air Force Base, where it was equipped with the McDonnell Douglas F-15 Eagle air superiority fighter.

In 1976 the 71st assumed the name of "Ironmen" as a result of the fist of mail (knight's armored glove) on the squadron's emblem. 1982 saw the 71st become the first TAC squadron fully equipped with the factory new F-15C Eagle aircraft. The 71st routinely deployed throughout the US and Europe to hone its skills during the Cold War.

On 7 August 1990, the 71st deployed to Saudi Arabia with 24 F-15C air-superiority fighter aircraft as the first US combat force to land in support of Operation Desert Shield. Over the next five months, the Ironmen flew nearly a year's worth of flying hours, over 13,000 hours and 3,300 sorties—all a prelude to war. In the early morning hours of 17 January 1991, while sweeping the skies near Baghdad, the 71st achieved one of the first aerial victories of Operation Desert Storm and helped pave the way for one of the most significant events in the history of the USAF: complete and total air domination of an adversary, the 71st having flown 1091 missions and 5881 hours in six short weeks. On 7 March 1991, the 71st redeployed to Langley.

=== Air Combat Command ===
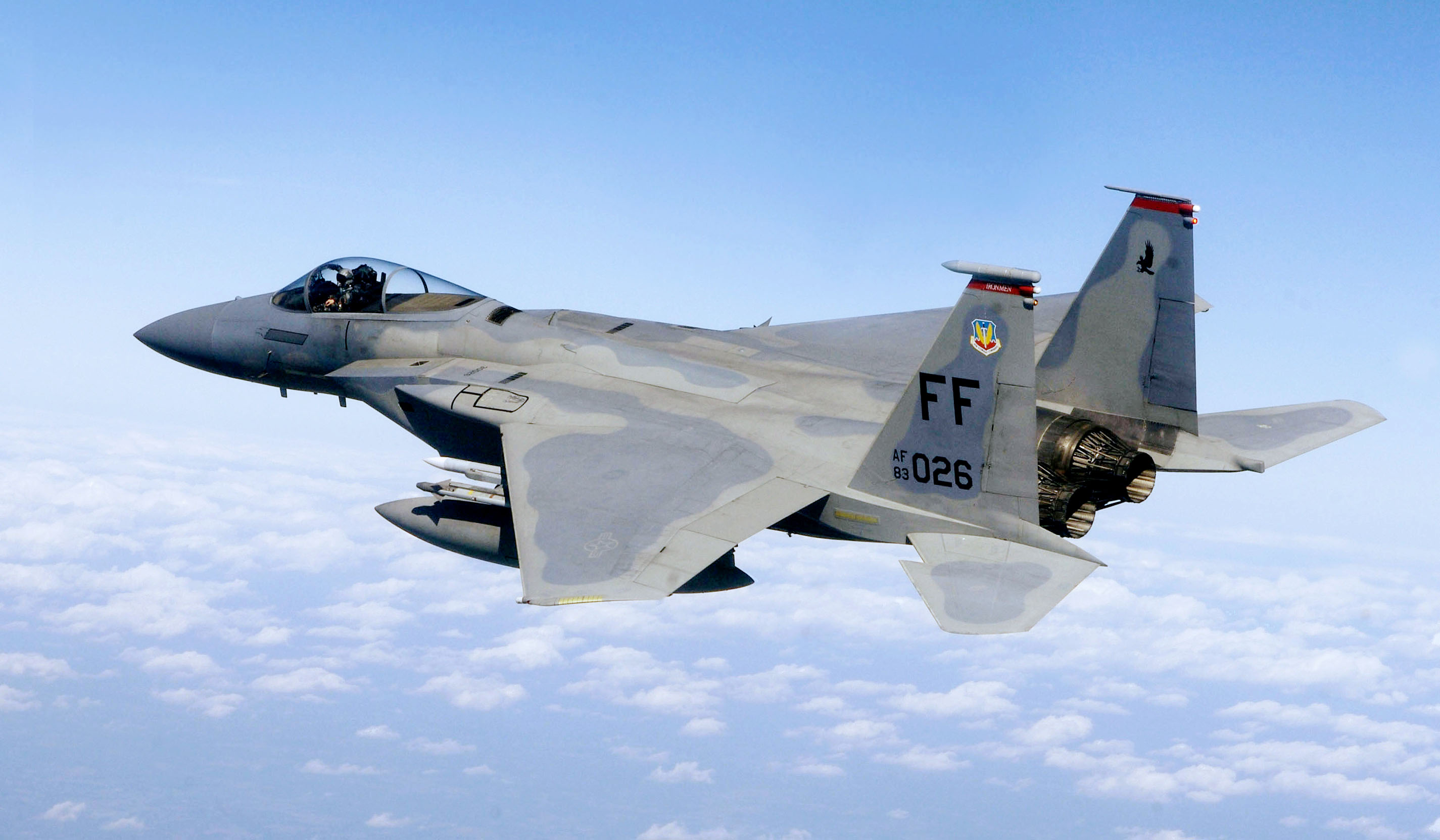
F-15 Eagle of the 71st Fighter Squadron

Since the first Gulf War, the 71st successfully supported the UN-sanctioned Operation Southern Watch and Operation Northern Watch in Iraq with many deployments to Saudi Arabia and Turkey. 71 FS pilots defeated dozens of Iraqi surface-to-air missiles (SAM) attacks, and hundreds of anti-aircraft artillery (AAA) attacks while enforcing United Nations sanctions, without loss or damage to a single aircraft.

In 1992 the 71st FS set the all time flying safety record for the F-15 with 124,790 hours of accident free flying.

Minutes after the 9/11 terrorist attacks on the United States, the 71st launched its F-15s to patrol the skies of the US east coast, intercepting and escorting dozens of airliners to safe landings at airports around the country. The 71st also had aircraft deployed to Nellis Air Force Base, Nevada at the time of the attacks, and were the first fighters to take to the skies to patrol Las Vegas and southern California.

During the second Gulf War in 2003, Operation Iraqi Freedom, the 71st deployed to Tabuk, KSA and flew combat air patrols for the first part of the war, and helped to gain total air superiority for the duration of the conflict.

In 2006, the 71st Fighter Squadron was awarded the Hughes/Raytheon Trophy for outstanding aerial achievement for a record 5th time. (Note: The awards were for 1969, 1993, 1998, 2001, and 2005.) On 1 September 2010 the last F-15s assigned to the 71st departed Langley (slightly ahead of schedule) as a prelude to unit inactivation programmed for the end of September 2010, ending the association of the F-15 at Langley. On 30 September 2010 the 71st Fighter Squadron was inactivated.

=== Fighter training ===
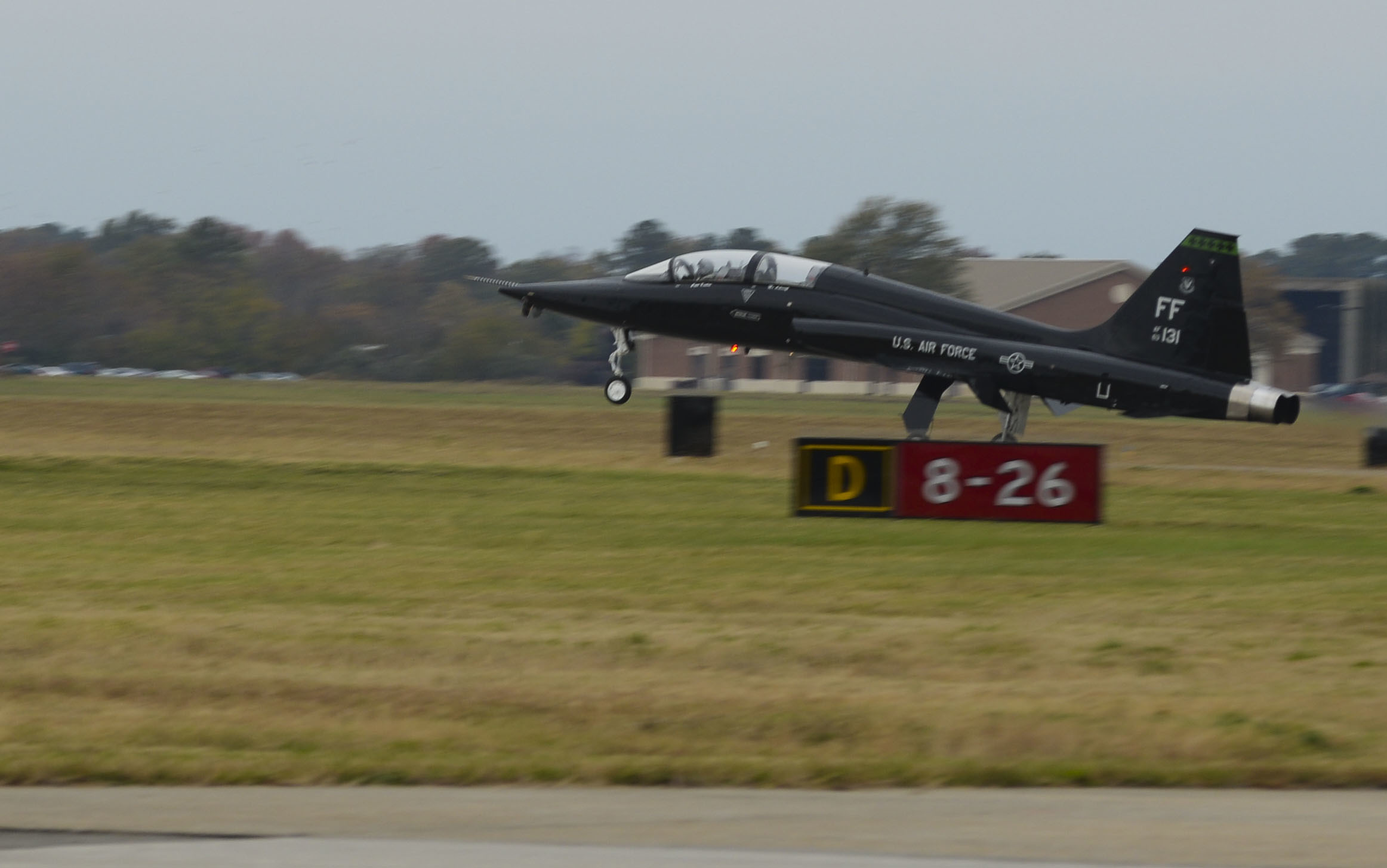
Northrop T-38 adversarial trainer at Langley AFB

The 71st was renamed the 71st Fighter Training Squadron and reactivated in August 2015, flying the Northrop T-38 Talon. Its mission was to conduct adversarial air training for the Lockheed Martin F-22 Raptors flown by the other squadrons of the 1st Fighter Wing. This training was previously performed by F-22s of the 27th Fighter Squadron at substantially more expense. The squadron continued this mission through 2021, until its personnel and aircraft were withdrawn and it became a paper unit.

In October 2022, the squadron again became the 71st Fighter Squadron. On 6 January 2023, the squadron again received personnel. Its mission is to serve as a formal training unit for the F-22. The first F-22 arrived on 29 March 2023.

== Lineage ==
- Constituted as the 71st Pursuit Squadron (Interceptor) on 14 December 1940

Activated on 1 January 1941
Redesignated 71st Pursuit Squadron (Fighter) on 12 March 1941
Redesignated 71st Fighter Squadron (Twin Engine) on 15 May 1942
Redesignated 71st Fighter Squadron, Two Engine on 28 February 1944
Inactivated on 16 October 1945

- Redesignated 71st Fighter Squadron, Single Engine on 5 April 1946

Redesignated 71st Fighter Squadron, Jet Propelled on 20 June 1946
Activated on 3 July 1946
Redesignated 71st Fighter Squadron, Jet on 15 June 1948
Redesignated 71st Fighter-Interceptor Squadron on 16 April 1950
Redesignated 71st Tactical Fighter Squadron on 1 July 1971
Redesignated 71st Fighter Squadron on 1 November 1991
Inactivated on 30 September 2010

- Redesignated 71st Fighter Training Squadron on 17 June 2015

Activated 14 August 2015
Redesignated 71st Fighter Squadron on 15 October 2022

=== Assignments ===
- 1st Pursuit Group (later 1st Fighter Group), 1 January 1941 – 16 October 1945
- 1st Fighter Group (later 1st Fighter-Interceptor Group), 3 July 1946 (attached to Eastern Air Defense Force, 15 August 1950 – 24 October 1950, 30th Air Division, 25 October 1950 – 3 June 1951, 103d Fighter-Interceptor Group, 4 June 1951 – 6 February 1952)
- 4708th Defense Wing, 6 February 1952
- 500th Air Defense Group, 16 February 1953
- 1st Fighter Group, 18 August 1955
- 1st Fighter Wing, 1 February 1961
- 328th Fighter Wing, 16 January 1967
- 28th Air Division, 18 July 1968 (attached to 314th Air Division, c. 22 December 1968-c. 9 June 1969)
- 24th Air Division, 19 November 1969
- 1st Tactical Fighter Wing, 1 July 1971 (attached to 1st Tactical Fighter Wing (Provisional), 7 August 1990 – 8 March 1991)
- 1st Operations Group, 1 October 1991 – 30 September 2010
- 1st Operations Group, 14 August 2015 – present

=== Stations ===
- Selfridge Field, Michigan, 1 January 1940
- San Diego Naval Air Station, California, 9 December 1941
- Minter Field, California, 12 Feb – 20 May 1942
- RAF Goxhill, England, 10 June 1942
- RAF Ibsley, England, 24 Aug – 23 October 1942
- Saint-Leu Airfield, Algeria, 8 November 1942
- Tafaraoui Airport, Algeria, 14 November 1942
- Nouvion Airfield, Algeria, 21 November 1942
- Maison Blanche Airport, Algeria, 17 December 1942
- Biskra Airfield, Algeria, 22 December 1942
- Chateau-dun-du-Rhumel Airfield, Algeria, 16 February 1943
- Mateur Airfield, Tunisia, 28 June 1943 (detachments operated from: Gerbini Airfield, Sicily, 5–18 September 1943 and Gambut Airfield, Libya, 5–15 October 1943)
- Djedeida Airfield, Tunisia, 31 October 1943
- Monserrato, Sardinia, 29 November 1943
- Gioia del Colle Airfield, Italy, 8 December 1943
- Salsola Airfield, Italy, 9 January 1944

Detachment operated from: Aghione, Corsica, 11–21 August 1944
Detachment operated from: Vincenzo Airfield, Italy, 10 Jan – 18 February 1945

- Lesina Airfield, Italy, 14 March 1945
- Marcianise, Italy, 26 September 1845 – 16 October 1945
- March Field (later March Air Force Base), California, 3 July 1946
- George Air Force Base, California, 18 July 1950
- Griffiss Air Force Base, New York, 15 August 1950
- Greater Pittsburgh Airport, Pennsylvania, 21 October 1950
- Selfridge Air Force Base, Michigan, 18 August 1955
- Richards-Gebaur Air Force Base, Missouri, 16 January 1967
- Malmstrom Air Force Base, Montana, 18 July 1968 (deployed at Osan Air Base, South Korea, c. 22 December 1968-c. 9 June 1969
- MacDill Air Force Base, Florida, 1 July 1971
- Langley Air Force Base, Virginia, 30 June 1975 – 30 September 2010

Operated from King Abdul Aziz Air Base, Saudi Arabia

- Joint Base Langley–Eustis, 14 August 2015 – present

=== Aircraft ===
- Seversky P-35, 1941
- Republic YP-43 Lancer, 1941
- Lockheed P-38 Lightning, 1941–1945
- Lockheed P-80 (later F-80) Shooting Star, 1946–1949
- North American F-86A Sabre, 1949–1953
- North American F-86D Sabre Interceptor, 1953–1957
- North American F-86L Sabre Interceptor, 1957–1958
- Convair F-102 Delta Dagger, 1958–1960
- Convair F-106 Delta Dart, 1960–1971
- McDonnell F-4 Phantom II, 1971–1975
- McDonnell Douglas F-15 Eagle, 1976–2010
- T-38A/B Talon, 2015–unknown
- Lockheed Martin F-22 Raptor, 2023–present

== Campaigns ==
- World War II: Antisubmarine, American Theater; Egypt-Libya; Air Offensive, Europe; Algeria-French Morocco; Tunisia; Sicily; Naples-Foggia; Anzio; Rome-Arno; Normandy; Northern France; Southern France; North Apennines; Rhineland; Central Europe; Po Valley; Air Combat, EAME Theater.
- Southwest Asia: Defense of Saudi Arabia; Liberation and Defense of Kuwait

== Popular culture ==
In the 2007 movie Transformers, the Decepticon Starscream, disguised as an F-22 Raptor, bears the fuselage and tail markings of the Air Combat Command, the 1st Fighter Wing the 71st, 94th and 27th; All current Air Force fighter aircraft unit Wing Flagship aircraft display all squadrons contained within the wing; however, as previously noted, the 71st has not switched to the F-22.
