= Air Combat Command =

Major command of the US Air Force

- Shield of Air Combat Command
- Active: 21 March 1946 – present (80 years, 6 months) Detailed: 1 June 1992 – present (as Air Combat Command) 21 March 1946 – 1 June 1992 (as Tactical Air Command)
- Country: United States
- Branch: United States Air Force (26 September 1947 – Present); United States Army ( Army Air Forces; 21 March 1946 – 26 September 1947)
- Type: Major Command
- Role: "ACC organizes, trains and equips combat-ready Airmen to control and exploit the air, cyberspace and the electromagnetic spectrum in support of the Joint Force."
- Size: 84,850 Airmen; 1,110 aircraft
- Headquarters: Langley Air Force Base, Joint Base Langley–Eustis, Virginia, U.S.
- Engagements: Operation Urgent Fury

- Decorations: Air Force Organization Excellence Award
- Website: acc.af.mil

Commanders
- Commander: Gen Adrian L. Spain
- Deputy Commander: Lt Gen Michael G. Koscheski
- Command Chief: CMSgt Jeremy L. Unterseher

Aircraft flown
- Attack: A-10C, AC-130J, MQ-9
- Electronic warfare: E-3G, E-9A, E-11A, EA-37B Compass Call
- Fighter: F-15C/D, F-15E, F-16C/D, F-22A, F-35A
- Multirole helicopter: HH-60G
- Reconnaissance: MC-12, RC-26B, RC-135S/U/V/W, RQ-4, RQ-170, U-2S, U-28A, WC-135
- Trainer: T-38A, TC-135S/W, QF-4, QF-16
- Transport: C-17A, C-130J
- Tanker: HC-130J, KC-135R, MC-130J
- LGM-30G

The Air Combat Command (ACC) is a major command (MAJCOM) of the United States Air Force, reporting to Headquarters, United States Air Force (HAF) at the Pentagon. It is the primary provider of air combat forces for the Air Force, and it is the direct successor to Tactical Air Command. Air Combat Command is headquartered at Langley Air Force Base, Joint Base Langley–Eustis, Virginia, United States.

ACC directly operates 1,110 fighter, attack, reconnaissance, combat search and rescue, airborne command and control and electronic aircraft along with command, control, computing, communications and intelligence (C4I) systems, Air Force ground forces, conducts global information operations, and controls Air Force intelligence. As of April 6, 2023, ACC operated 48 fighter squadrons and 9 attack squadrons.

Air Combat Command consists of approximately 74,240 active duty airmen and 10,610 Department of the Air Force civilians. When mobilized, more than 49,000 additional airmen of the Air Force Reserve and the Air National Guard, along with over 700 additional aircraft, are operationally-gained and assigned to ACC, bringing total aircraft to more than 1,800 and number of airmen to 123,240.

== Mission ==
Air Combat Command's mission is to provide air combat forces to the geographic unified combatant commands. ACC organizes, trains, equips, and maintains combat-ready units for rapid deployment abroad while also ensuring air defense of the United States is strong enough for both peacetime and wartime needs. ACC Numbered Air Forces serve as the air components for United States Central Command, United States Southern Command, and United States Northern Command. ACC augments the forces of the United States European Command, United States Africa Command, United States Pacific Command, and United States Strategic Command.

== History ==
Air Combat Command was created 1 June 1992 after the inactivation of the Tactical Air Command (TAC), Strategic Air Command (SAC) and Military Airlift Command (MAC). Upon activation, ACC assumed control of all former-TAC fighters, all bombers, reconnaissance platforms, battle management resources, and Intercontinental ballistic missiles (ICBMs). Furthermore, ACC had some KC-135 and KC-10 aerial refueling tankers and C-130 tactical airlift aircraft in its composite, reconnaissance, and other combat wings. In 1993, control of the ICBM force was transferred to the Air Force Space Command (AFSPC) until transferred again to Air Force Global Strike Command (AFGSC) on 1 December 2009.

Following the inactivation of SAC at Offutt AFB, Nebraska, a new unified command, the United States Strategic Command, was activated at Offutt, created to manage the combined strategic nuclear forces belonging to both the U.S. Air Force and the U.S. Navy.

Historically, Combat Command was an earlier air unit designation. During 1941 and early 1942, the tactical air units of the War Department, formerly known as the GHQ Air Force, formed the Air Force Combat Command. The AFCC was dissolved in the reorganization of the United States Army, effective 9 March 1942, which created the United States Army Air Forces as a major command of the Army, which functioned as a de facto independent service branch of the Armed Forces.

=== Mission Realignments ===
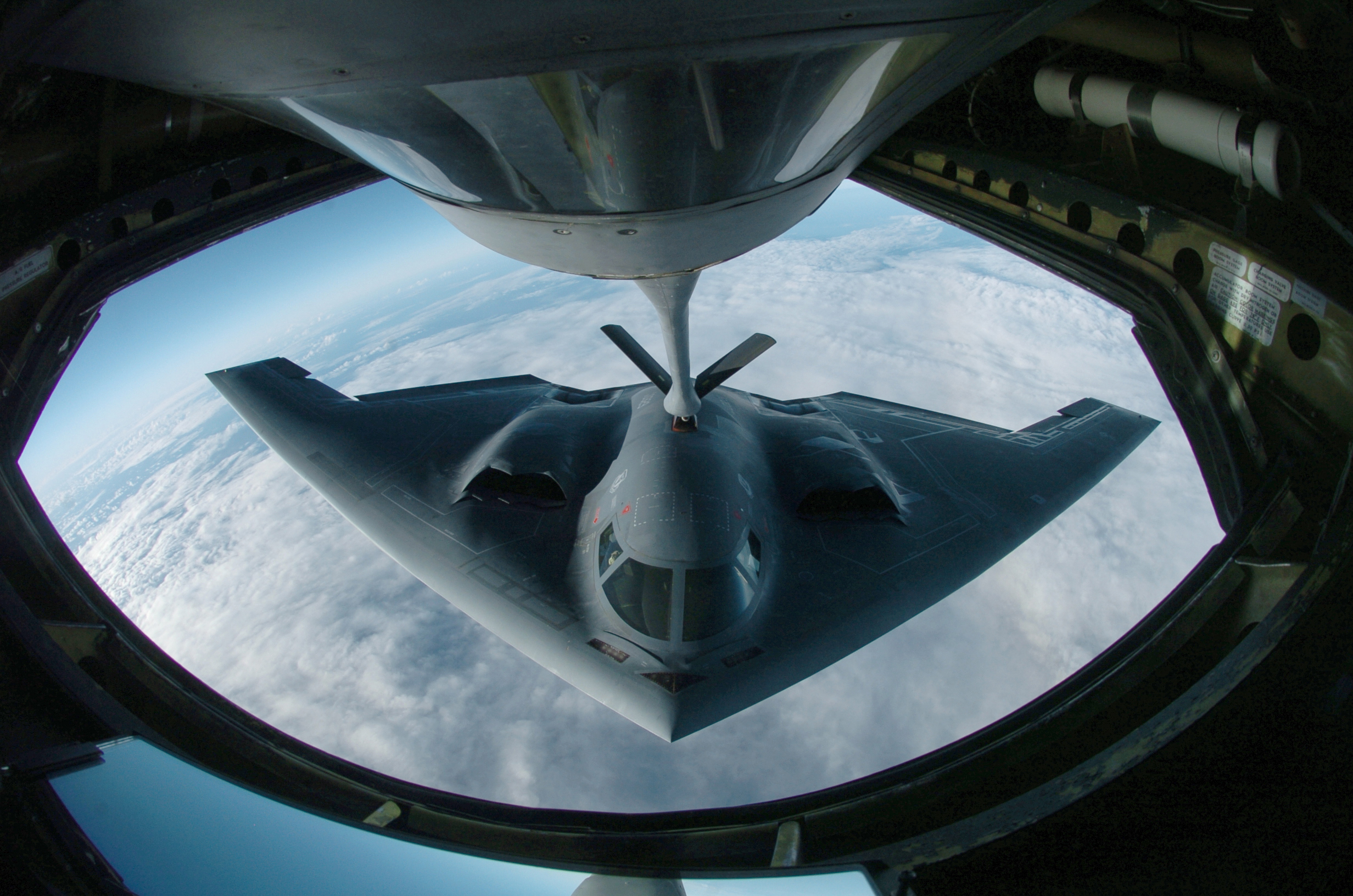
A B-2 Spirit bomber from the 509th Bomb Wing, Whiteman AFB, Missouri refuels from a KC-135 Stratotanker

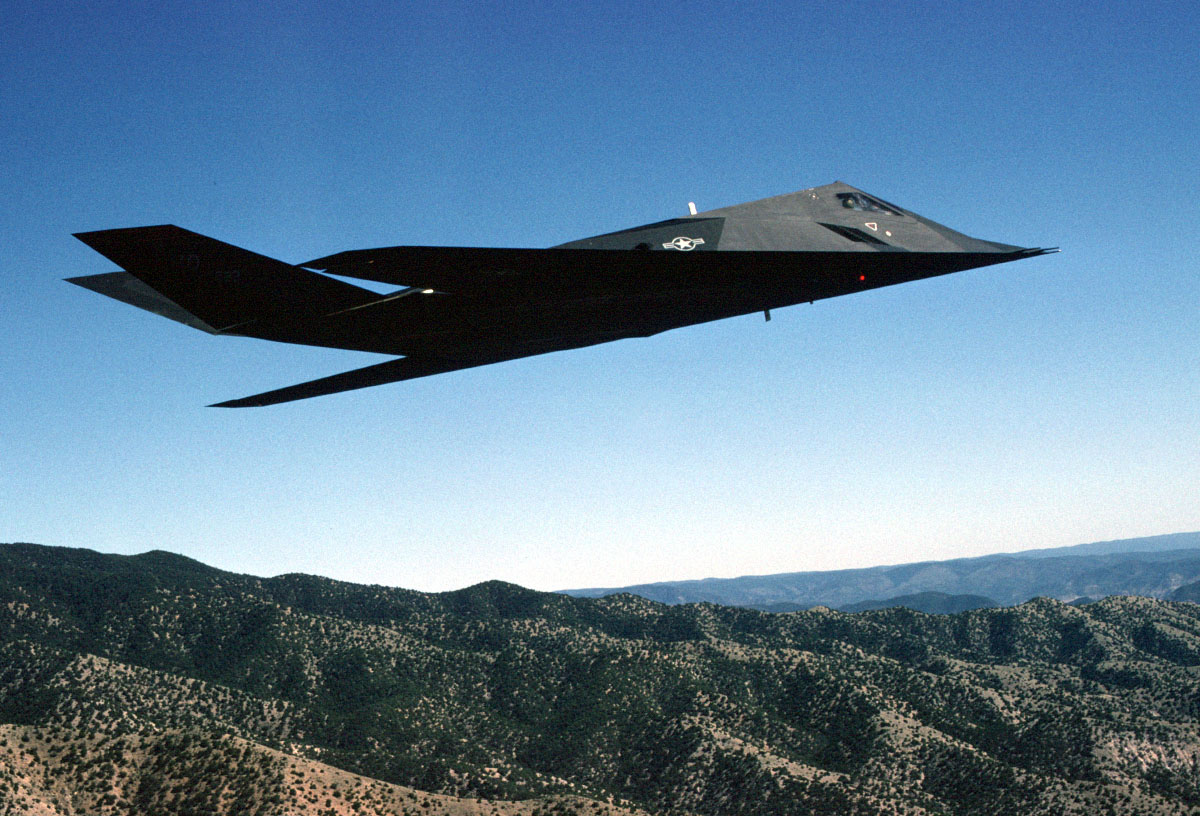
An F-117A Nighthawk Stealth fighter from the 49th Fighter Wing, 9th Fighter Squadron "Iron Knights," from Holloman AFB, New Mexico, flies a training mission over the New Mexico desert

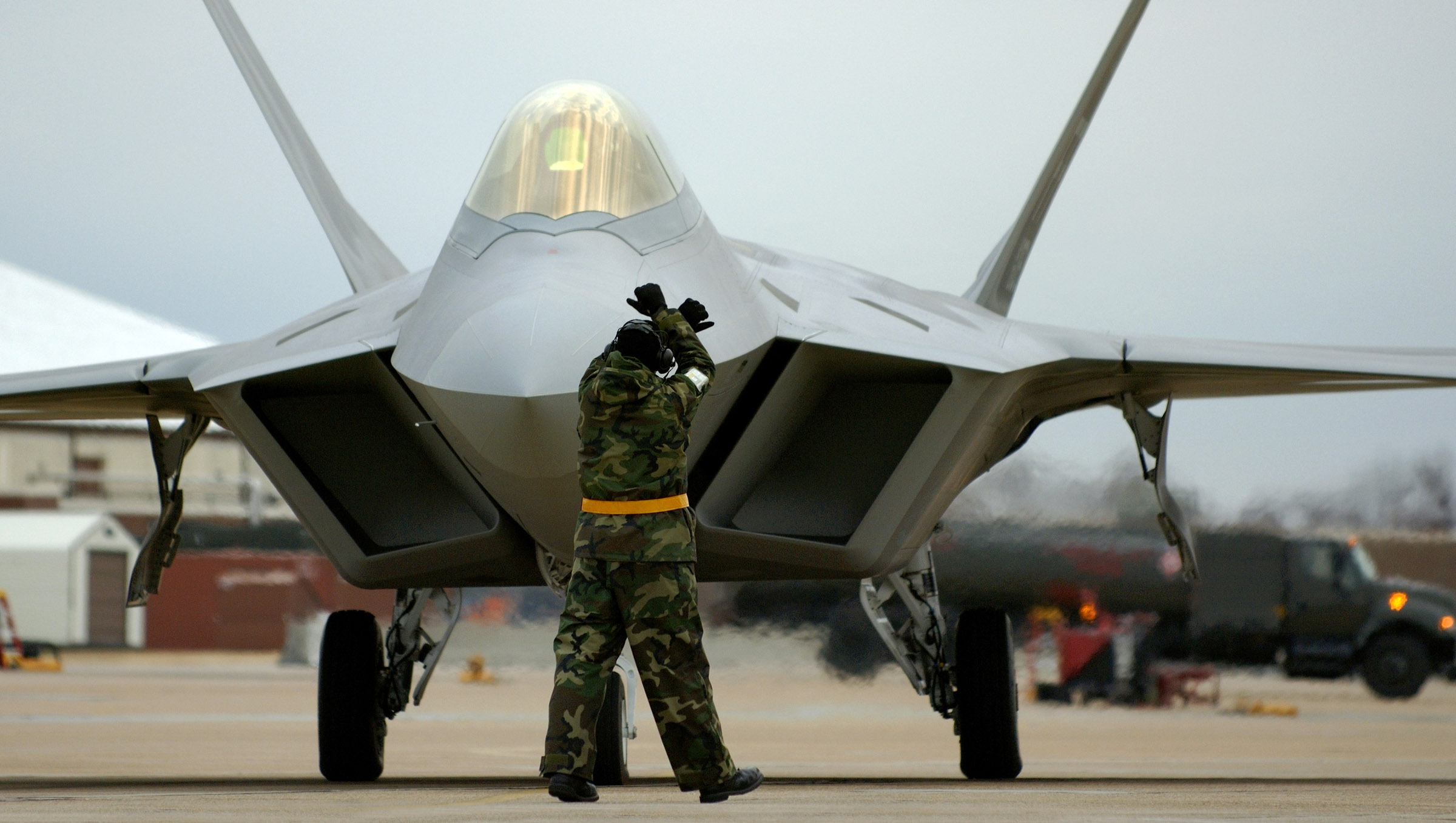
F-22A from the 1st Fighter Wing, 27th Fighter Squadron, Langley AFB, Virginia being marshalled into place on the flightline

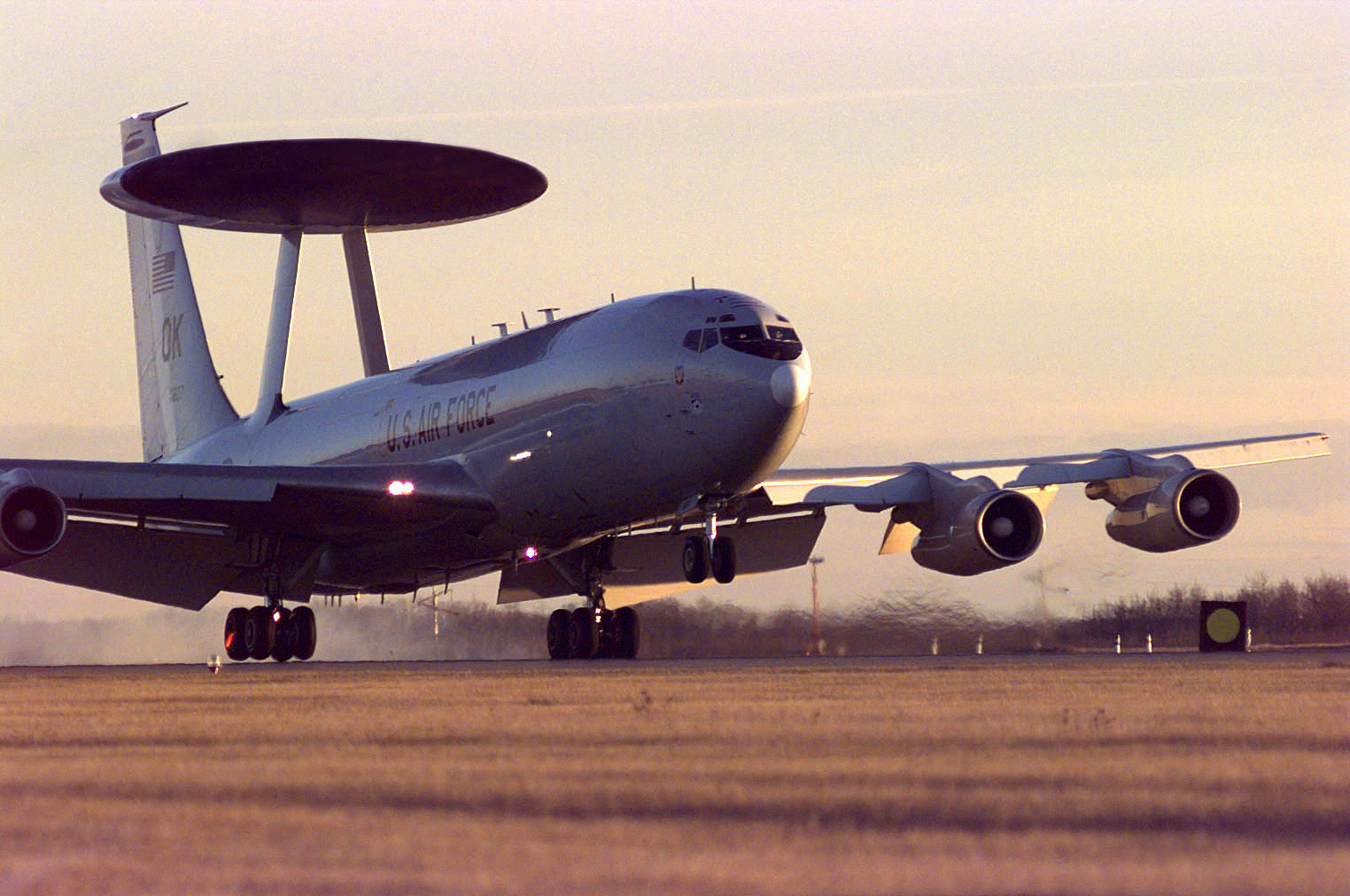
A Boeing E-3 Sentry Airborne Warning and Control System from Tinker AFB, Oklahoma

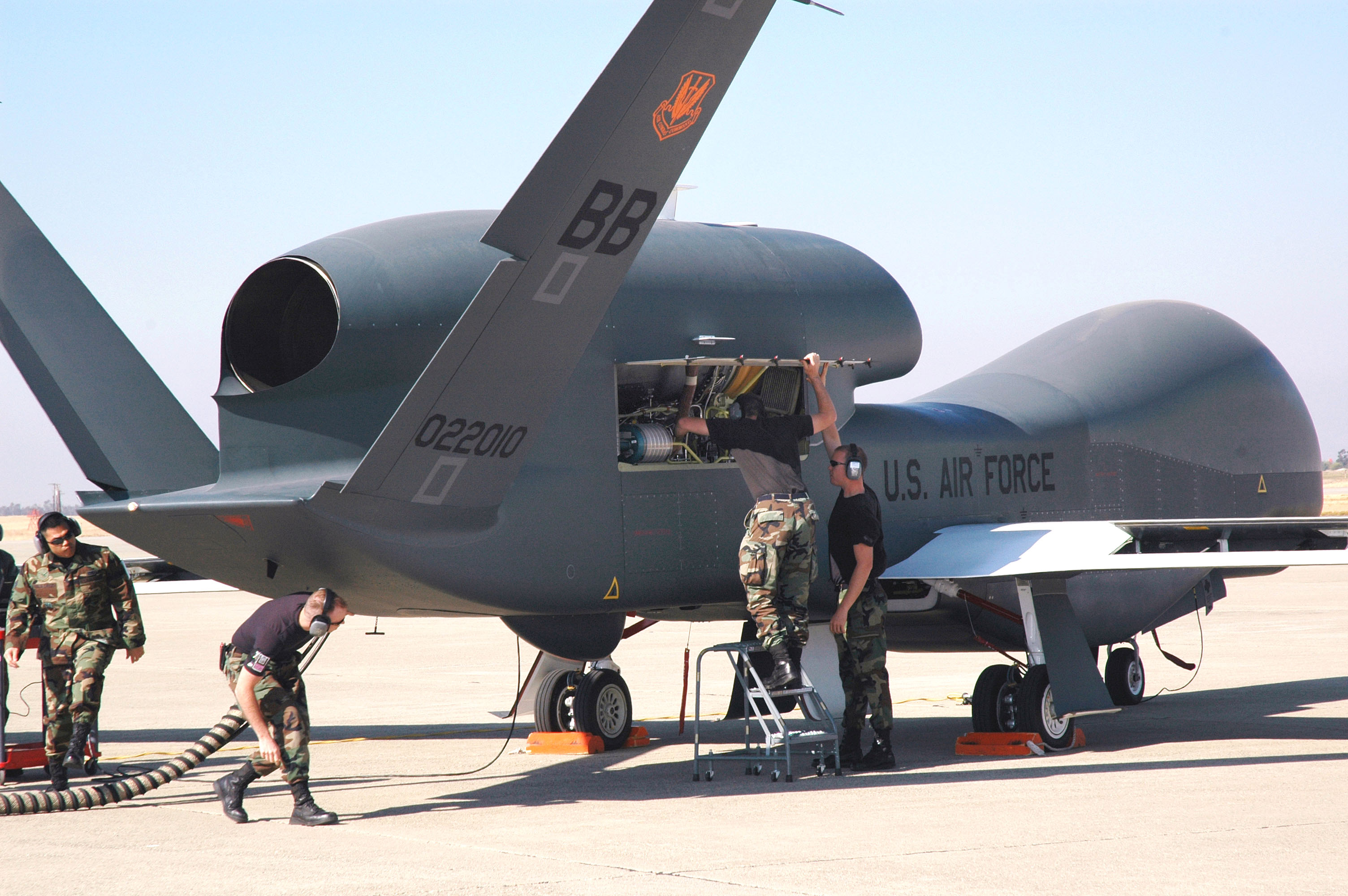
A maintenance crew prepares an RQ-4 Global Hawk for a test at Beale Air Force Base

==== Combat search and rescue ====
Not long after activation, ACC underwent organizational and mission changes. The first such major change was the transfer of the combat search and rescue (CSAR) mission from Air Mobility Command to ACC. With the realigning of search and rescue units, ACC gained additional resources, as well as a new mission. The formal transfer took place on 1 February 1993, when the Air Rescue Service (ARS) was assigned to ACC. On 2 July of the same year, the ARS was disestablished and rescue units became fully integrated in the same manner as other ACC units reporting to numbered air forces. The USAF Combat Rescue School was subsequently assigned to the 57th Wing at Nellis AFB, Nevada.

==== Flight training ====
One of the most significant changes for Air Combat Command resulted from an overhaul of flying training responsibilities. Following its activation, ACC was responsible for aircraft-specific aircrew training, including initial weapon system and continuation training. On 1 July 1993, the 58th and 325th Fighter Wings—F-16 and F-15 training units transferred from ACC to Air Education and Training Command (AETC). Concurrently, Luke AFB, Arizona, and Tyndall AFB, Florida, for which those respective wings were the host units, also moved from ACC to AETC ownership. However, on 1 October 2012, both Tyndall AFB and the 325th Fighter Wing returned to the control of ACC. The 56th Fighter Wing and Luke AFB returned to ACC control on 17 July 2026.

==== Tanker and airlift ====
The next major organizational change resulted from a fine-tuning of aerial refueling and airlift resources. From its activation, Air Combat Command had assumed ownership of some C-130 Hercules theater airlift assets and KC-10 Extender and KC-135 Stratotankers. Just as ownership of overseas C-130 resources had already been transferred to USAFE and PACAF commanders, it was decided that all C-130s based in the CONUS would be under the control of ACC, while at the same time, almost all KC-135 tankers would be assigned to Air Mobility Command.

There was historical precedent for the reassignment of C-130s to Air Combat Command. During the earliest days of Tactical Air Command (TAC), the command had carried out the "tactical" or combat airborne aspect of airlift operations, leaving the "strategic" or logistical mission to Military Air Transport Service, later redesignated Military Airlift Command (the precursor of today's Air Mobility Command) in 1966. The tactical airlift mission included logistical airlift, airborne operations, aeromedical evacuation, and air support for special operations. This division of the airlift mission continued until 1 December 1974, when TAC transferred its CONUS-based tactical airlift units, including Air Force Reserve and Air National Guard tactical airlift units, to Military Airlift Command (MAC). MAC gained the overseas units from theater commands on 31 March 1975.

On 1 October 1993, all Air Mobility Command C-130s with the exception of those permanently under United States Air Forces in Europe (USAFE) and Pacific Air Forces (PACAF) regions were transferred to ACC, while USAFE and PACAF assumed control of the C-130 permanently based in their respective geographic regions. Concurrently, all KC-10 tankers and all KC-135 tankers except those at Mountain Home AFB, Idaho, which supported the fighter and bomber aircraft of the composite wing stationed there, transferred to AMC. ACC also retained two KC-135s at Offutt AFB Nebraska and Grand Forks AFB, North Dakota under ACC control until transferring them to AMC on 1 October 1993. McConnell AFB, Kansas; Fairchild AFB, Washington; and their respective air refueling wings were also transferred to AMC in January 1994 and July 1994, respectively.

In 1997, a subsequent USAF reorganization of ACC and AMC resulted in all CONUS-based C-130 theater airlift aircraft being reassigned from ACC back to AMC. This change also shifted operational claimancy for all "slick" theater airlift mission C-130s in the Air Force Reserve and CONUS-based Air National Guard. USAFE and PACAF C-130 assets remained in those respective MAJCOMs to include PACAF's operational claimancy for Alaska Air National Guard C-130 and HC-130 assets.

=== Operational deployments ===
In Southwest Asia, Air Combat Command provided active duty and reserve component forces for the follow-on to Operation Desert Storm and the establishment of Operation Southern Watch to deter Iraqi aggression. In October 1994, ACC also demonstrated its ability to react quickly to the buildup of Iraqi troops near the border of Kuwait. In addition, ACC, from its inception, has provided indispensable support to counter-drug operations, including Airborne Warning and Control System (AWACS), reconnaissance and fighter aircraft, as well as radar and connectivity assets.

Participation in humanitarian operations has also been a recurring theme. Air Combat Command supported the humanitarian efforts of the United States Air Forces in Europe (USAFE), deploying active duty and air reserve component forces to Provide Promise and Deny Flight in Eastern Europe and Operation Provide Comfort out of Incirlik AB, Turkey. Provide Promise offered humanitarian relief airlift support to the city of Sarajevo, while Deny Flight enforced the "no-fly" zone against Serb air attacks on Bosnian civilians. Operation Provide Comfort, another humanitarian operation, also provided relief to Kurdish inhabitants of northern Iraq who had undergone fierce repression by the Iraqi government.

In addition, ACC supported United States Atlantic Command's humanitarian relief to Haitian refugees associated with Operation GTMO at Guantanamo Bay Naval Base, Cuba. Similarly, the command supported Operation Safe Haven and the processing of Cuban refugees during the latter part of the summer of 1994. Across the Atlantic, Air Combat Command units participated in Operation Restore Hope, largely an Air Mobility Command humanitarian operation intended to provide food for Somalia. Also, ACC regular and ACC-gained Air National Guard C-130 units deployed to Uganda and Kenya to participate in Operation Support Hope. This operation, conducted by the United States European Command, comprised part of the United Nations effort to provide humanitarian relief to victims of the civil war in Rwanda.

In keeping with its global responsibilities, ACC initiated a series of "Global Power" missions in 1993. ACC's bomber wings are required to perform out-of-CONUS training flights to demonstrate the capability to perform their "quick reaction" worldwide mission. On one of the global power missions, two B-1 Lancer aircraft of the 28th Bomb Wing, Ellsworth AFB, South Dakota, set a B-1 flying time record on the first leg of their round-the-world flight, 11–13 August 1993. The following year, two B-52s from the 2d Bomb Wing, Barksdale AFB, Louisiana, circumnavigated the globe in 47.2 hours, the longest jet aircraft flight in history.

=== Twenty-first century ===
Air Combat Command units flew operational missions during the 2002 Operation Enduring Freedom - the U.S. invasion of Afghanistan, and the Iraqi War, especially in the 2003-11 phase when there was a large-scale U.S. presence in the country.

ACC units are actively flying combat missions in the Middle East, especially as part of Operation Inherent Resolve.

=== Predecessor units merged into Air Combat Command 1992 ===
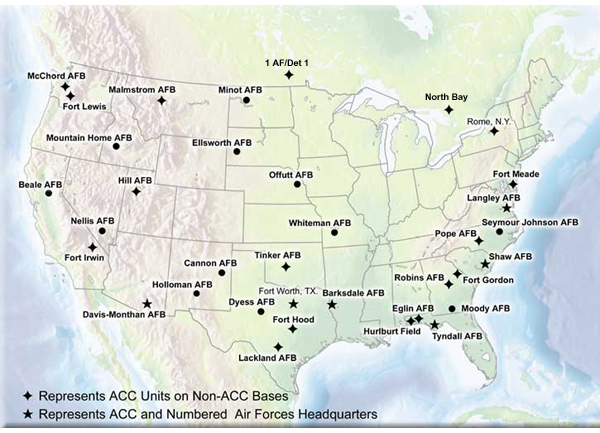
Air Combat Command bases c. 2001

Strategic Air Command
2d Bomb Wing

Barksdale AFB, LA (Xfer to Air Force Global Strike Command, 1 August 2010)

5th Bomb Wing

Minot AFB, ND (Xfer to Air Force Global Strike Command, 1 August 2010)

7th Bomb Wing

Carswell AFB, TX (Xfer to Dyess AFB, TX on 1 October 1993; Xfer to Air Force Global Strike Command, 1 October 2015)

9th Reconnaissance Wing

Beale AFB, CA

28th Bomb Wing

Ellsworth AFB, SD (Xfer to Air Force Global Strike Command, 1 October 2015)

42d Bomb Wing

Loring AFB, ME (Base and wing BRAC Inactivated, 30 September 1994)

44th Missile Wing

Ellsworth AFB, SD (Xfer to Air Force Space Command, 1 July 1993)

55th Strategic Reconnaissance Wing

Offut AFB NE

90th Missile Wing

F E Warren AFB, WY (Xfer to Air Force Space Command, 1 July 1993)

91st Missile Wing

Minot AFB, ND (Xfer to Air Force Space Command, 1 July 1993

92d Bomb Wing

Fairchild AFB WA (Xfer to Air Mobility Command, 1 July 1994)

93d Wing

Castle AFB, CA (Base and wing BRAC Inactivated, 30 September 1995)

96th Wing

Dyess AFB, TX (Wing only BRAC Inactivated, 1 October 1993)

319th Bombardment Wing

Grand Forks AFB, ND (Xfer to Air Mobility Command as 319 ARW, 1 October 1993)

321st Missile Wing

Grand Forks AFB, ND (Xfer to Air Force Space Command, 1 July 1993)

341st Missile Wing

Malmstrom AFB, MT (Xfer to Air Force Space Command, 1 July 1993)

351st Missile Wing

Whiteman AFB, MO (Xfer to Air Force Space Command, 1 July 1993)

379th Wing

Wurtsmith AFB, MI (Base and wing BRAC Inactivated, 15 June 1993)

384th Bomb Wing

McConnell AFB, KS (Wing only BRAC Inactivated; xfer to 384th Bomb Group, 1 October 1994)

410th Wing

K. I. Sawyer AFB, MI (Base and wing BRAC Inactivated, 30 September 1995)

416th Wing

Griffiss AFB, NY (Base and wing BRAC Inactivated, 30 September 1995)

509th Bombardment Wing

Whiteman AFB, MO (Xfer to Air Force Global Strike Command, 1 August 2010)

Military Airlift Command
314th Airlift Wing

Little Rock AFB, AR

Tactical Air Command
1st Fighter Wing

Langley AFB, VA

4th Fighter Wing

Seymour Johnson AFB, NC

23d Fighter Wing

Base and wing BRAC Inactivated at England AFB, LA; reactivated as 23d Wing, Pope AFB, NC. At Moody AFB, GA since December, 2007)

27th Fighter Wing

Cannon AFB, NM (Xfer to Air Force Special Operations Command, 1 October 2007)

31st Fighter Wing

Homestead AFB, FL (Moved WOPE to Aviano AB Italy on 1 April 1994 and assigned to USAFE)

33d Fighter Wing

Eglin AFB, FL

35th Fighter Wing

George AFB, CA (Base and wing BRAC Inactivated, 15 December 1992. Reactivated 31 May 1993. (Xfer to Pacific Air Forces, 1 October 1994 at Misawa AB, Japan))

37th Fighter Wing

Tonopah AP, NV (Wing Inactivated 8 July 1992; F-117s xfer to 49 FW, Holloman AFB, NM. Xfer to AETC, 1 July 1993 at Lackland AFB, TX)

49th Fighter Wing

Holloman AFB, NM

53d Wing

Eglin AFB, FL

56th Fighter Wing

MacDill AFB, FL (Moved WOPE to Luke AFB, AZ on 1 April 1994; reassigned to AETC. Rejoined ACC in 2026.)

57th Fighter Wing

Nellis AFB, NV

58th Fighter Wing

Luke AFB, AZ (Moved WOPE to Kirtland AFB, NM on 1 April 1994
Reassigned to AETC as 58th Special Operations Wing)

67th Reconnaissance Wing

Bergstrom AFB, TX (Base and wing BRAC Inactivated, 30 September 1993)

85th Wing

NAS Keflavik, Iceland (Wing only BRAC Inactivated, 31 May 1993. Reactivated at Ebbing Air National Guard Base, Arkansas, 2 July 2024 as the 85th Fighter Group as a GSU of the 33d FW.)

325th Fighter Wing

Tyndall AFB, FL (Reassigned to AETC 1 July 1993; rejoined ACC 1 October 2012)

347th Fighter Wing

Moody AFB, GA (Reassigned to AFSOC as 347 RQW 1 October 2003; merged into ACC 23 WG, 1 October 2006)

354th Fighter Wing

Myrtle Beach AFB, SC (BRAC Inactivated, 31 March 1993. Reactivated at Eielson AFB, Alaska 20 August 1993)

355th Fighter Wing

Davis-Monthan AFB, AZ

363d Fighter Wing

Shaw AFB, SC (Inactivated 30 December 1993; replaced by 20th Fighter Wing, 30 December 1993)

366th Fighter Wing

Mountain Home AFB, ID

388th Fighter Wing

Hill AFB, UT

475th Weapons Evaluation Group

Tyndall AFB, FL

507th Air Control Wing

Shaw AFB, SC (Wing only BRAC Inactivated, 12 June 1993)

552d Air Control Wing

Tinker AFB OK

602d Air Control Wing

Davis-Monthan AFB, AZ (Wing only BRAC Inactivated, 15 June 1992)

== Wings and groups ==
As of 2020, Air Combat Command consisted of the following units:

- United States Air Force Warfare Center (USAFWC)

HQ: Nellis AFB, Nevada

53d Wing, Eglin AFB, Florida

Includes 53d Test and Evaluation Group, Nellis AFB, Nevada
and 53d Weapons Evaluation Group, Tyndall AFB, Florida

350th Spectrum Warfare Wing, Eglin AFB, Florida
57th Wing, Nellis AFB, Nevada
Nevada Test and Training Range, Nellis AFB, Nevada
Utah Test and Training Range, Hill AFB, Utah
99th Air Base Wing, Nellis AFB, Nevada
505th Command and Control Wing, Hurlburt Field, Florida

- First Air Force (AFNORTH)

HQ: Tyndall AFB, Florida

Eastern Air Defense Sector, Rome, New York (former Griffiss AFB)
Western Air Defense Sector, McChord AFB, Washington
701st Air Defense Squadron, Tyndall AFB, Florida
702d Computer Systems Squadron, Tyndall AFB, Florida
722d Air Control Squadron, North Bay (CFB North Bay), Canada

- Ninth Air Force (AFCENT)

HQ: Shaw AFB, South Carolina

- Twelfth Air Force (AFSOUTH)

HQ: Davis–Monthan AFB, Arizona

- Fifteenth Air Force

HQ: Shaw AFB, South Carolina

1st Fighter Wing (F-22A, T-38A), Langley AFB, Virginia
4th Fighter Wing (F-15E), Seymour Johnson AFB, North Carolina
20th Fighter Wing (F-16C/D), Shaw AFB, South Carolina

Includes Poinsett Electronic Combat Range, South Carolina

23d Wing (HH-60, HC-130J, A-10C), Moody AFB, Georgia

Includes Avon Park Air Force Range, Florida

33rd Fighter Wing (F-35A), Eglin AFB, Florida
56th Fighter Wing (F-16C/D, F-35A), Luke AFB, Arizona
93d Air Ground Operations Wing, Moody AFB, Georgia
325th Fighter Wing (F-22A, T-38A), Tyndall AFB, Florida
355th Fighter Wing, Davis-Monthan AFB, Arizona
366th Fighter Wing (F-15E), Mountain Home AFB, Idaho
388th Fighter Wing (F-35A), Hill AFB, Utah
432d Wing (MQ-9), Creech AFB, Nevada
461st Air Control Wing, Robins AFB, Georgia
552d Air Control Wing (E-3G), Tinker AFB, Oklahoma
633d Air Base Wing, Langley AFB, Virginia
495th Fighter Group, Shaw AFB, South Carolina

- Sixteenth Air Force

HQ: Lackland AFB, Texas

9th Reconnaissance Wing (U-2S, RQ-4, MC-12), Beale AFB, California
55th Wing (WC/RC-135), Offutt AFB, Nebraska

Includes 55th Electronic Combat Group (EA-37B), Davis-Monthan AFB, Arizona

67th Cyberspace Wing, Lackland AFB, Texas

Includes 567th Cyberspace Operations Group, Scott AFB, Illinois

70th Intelligence, Surveillance and Reconnaissance Wing, Fort Meade, Maryland
319th Reconnaissance Wing, Grand Forks AFB, North Dakota
363d Intelligence, Surveillance and Reconnaissance Wing, Langley AFB, Virginia
480th Intelligence, Surveillance and Reconnaissance Wing, Langley AFB, Virginia
557th Weather Wing, Offutt AFB, Nebraska
616th Operations Center, Lackland AFB, Texas
688th Cyberspace Wing, Lackland AFB, Texas

Includes 5th Combat Communications Group, Robins AFB, Georgia
Also includes 38th Cyberspace Engineering Installation Group, Tinker AFB, Oklahoma

Air Force Technical Applications Center, Patrick Space Force Base, Florida

In 2009, responsibility for nuclear-capable bombers, specifically the B-2 Spirit and the B-52 Stratofortress, along with their associated units, bases and personnel, were transferred from ACC to the newly established Air Force Global Strike Command (AFGSC).

On 1 February 2010, the Eighth Air Force transferred to the Air Force Global Strike Command. The 7th Bomb Wing at Dyess Air Force Base, and the 28th Bomb Wing at Ellsworth Air Force Base also transferred to AFGSC on 1 October 2015, thus, ending 23 years of operational bomber service in ACC.

In October 2019 units from Twenty-Fourth Air Force and Twenty-Fifth Air Force were merged into the reactivated Sixteenth Air Force. Sixteenth Air Force headquarters is based at Joint Base San Antonio-Lackland, Texas.

In August 2020 units from Ninth Air Force and Twelfth Air Force were realigned under the reactivated Fifteenth Air Force. Fifteenth Air Force headquarters is based at Shaw Air Force Base, South Carolina.

In addition, units from Air Force Reserve Command's Tenth Air Force, and numerous other state and District of Columbia Air National Guard units are allocated to Air Combat Command when activated to federal service.

== Aircraft ==
As of 2026:

- Attack
  - Fairchild Republic A-10C Thunderbolt II
  - General Atomics MQ-9 Reaper
- Fighters
  - McDonnell Douglas F-15C/D Eagle
  - McDonnell Douglas F-15E Strike Eagle
  - General Dynamics F-16C/D Fighting Falcon
  - Lockheed Martin F-22A Raptor
  - Lockheed Martin F-35A Lightning II
- Combat Search and Rescue
  - HC-130J Combat King II

- Electronic Attack & Command and Control
  - E-3G Sentry
  - E-4B Nightwatch
  - E-9A Widget
  - E-11A
  - EA-37B Compass Call
  - EC-130J Commando Solo
  - RQ-4B Global Hawk
- Reconnaissance
  - Boeing RC-135S/U/V/W;TC-135;WC-135
  - Northrop Grumman RQ-4 Global Hawk
  - Lockheed U-2S Dragon Lady
  - Beechcraft MC-12 Liberty
  - Lockheed Martin RQ-170 Sentinel
- Helicopter
  - Sikorsky HH-60W Jolly Green II
- Trainer
  - Northrop T-38A, AT-38B and T-38C Talon

== Lineage ==
- Constituted as Air Combat Command and activated on 1 June 1992
- Consolidated with Tactical Air Command on 26 September 2016

=== Assignments ===
- Headquarters, United States Air Force, 1 June 1992 – present

=== Stations ===
- Langley Air Force Base, Hampton, Virginia, 1 June 1992 – present

=== Major components ===
Air Forces
First Air Force: 1 June 1992 – present
Second Air Force: 1 June 1992 – 1 July 1993

Transferred to Air Education and Training Command

Eighth Air Force: 1 June 1992 – 2009

Transferred to Air Force Global Strike Command, 2009

Ninth Air Force: 1 June 1992 – present
Twelfth Air Force: 1 June 1992 – present
Fifteenth Air Force: 20 August 2020 – present
Sixteenth Air Force: 11 October 2019 – present
Twentieth Air Force: 1 June 1992 – 1 July 1993

Transferred to Air Force Space Command, 1993
Transferred to Air Force Global Strike Command, 2009

Twenty-Fourth Air Force: 17 July 2018 – 11 October 2019
Twenty-Fifth Air Force: 29 September 2014 – 11 October 2019
Centers
Air & Space Expeditionary Force Center: 1 October 2002 – 29 August 2006
Aerospace Command and Control & Intelligence, Surveillance and Reconnaissance (later, Air Force Command and Control & Intelligence, Surveillance and Reconnaissance) Center (see Agencies below): 29 July 1997 – 30 April 2002. On 17 June 2010, the GCIC was officially redesignated the Air Force Command and Control Integration Center or AFC2IC as a direct reporting unit to Air Combat Command (ACC).
Air Force Contingency Supply Support Office (later, Air Force Contingency Supply Squadron; ACC Regional Supply Squadron; Combat Air Forces Logistics Support Center): 12 June 1992 – 1 July 1994; 1 December 1998 – present
Air Warfare Center (later, USAF Warfare Center): 1 June 1992 – present
Air Force Network Integration Center: 17 July 2018 – present
Air Force Spectrum Management Office: 17 July 2018 – present
Agencies
Air and Space Command and Control Agency (later, Aerospace Command and Control Agency; Aerospace Command and Control & Intelligence, Surveillance and Reconnaissance Center; Air Force Command and Control & Intelligence, Surveillance and Reconnaissance Center): 29 July 1997 – 30 April 2002.
Air Intelligence Agency: 1 February 2001 – 8 August 2006
Groups
Air Combat Command (ACC) Air Force Targeting Center: 2008–present
Air Combat Command (ACC) Communications Group: 1 June 1992 – present
Air Combat Command (ACC) Logistics Support Group: 1 July 1994 – 16 September 1999.

source for lineage, assignments, stations, components

== List of commanders ==
No.	Commander		Term		
No.	Portrait	Name	Took office	Left office	Term length
1	John M. Loh	General; John M. Loh (born 1938)	1 June 1992	23 June 1995	3 years, 22 days
2	Joseph Ralston	General; Joseph Ralston (born 1943)	23 June 1995	28 February 1996	250 days
-	Brett M. Dula	Lieutenant General; Brett M. Dula; Acting	28 February 1996	5 April 1996	37 days
3	Richard E. Hawley	General; Richard E. Hawley (born 1942)	5 April 1996	11 June 1999	3 years, 67 days
4	Ralph Eberhart	General; Ralph Eberhart (born 1946)	11 June 1999	8 February 2000	242 days
5	John P. Jumper	General; John P. Jumper (born 1945)	8 February 2000	25 August 2001	1 year, 198 days
-	Donald G. Cook	Lieutenant General; Donald G. Cook (born 1946); Acting	25 August 2001	14 November 2001	81 days
6	Hal M. Hornburg	General; Hal M. Hornburg (born 1945)	14 November 2001	17 November 2004	3 years, 3 days
-	Bruce A. Wright	Lieutenant General; Bruce A. Wright; Acting	17 November 2004	3 February 2005	78 days
-	William M. Fraser III	Lieutenant General; William M. Fraser III (born 1952); Acting	3 February 2005	27 May 2005	113 days
7	Ronald Keys	General; Ronald Keys (born 1945)	27 May 2005	2 October 2007	2 years, 128 days
8	John D. W. Corley	General; John D. W. Corley (born 1951)	2 October 2007	10 September 2009	1 year, 343 days
9	William M. Fraser III	General; William M. Fraser III (born 1952)	10 September 2009	13 September 2011	2 years, 3 days
10	Gilmary M. Hostage III	General; Gilmary M. Hostage III (born 1955)	13 September 2011	4 November 2014	3 years, 52 days
11	Herbert J. Carlisle	General; Herbert J. Carlisle (born 1957)	4 November 2014	10 March 2017	2 years, 126 days
12	James M. Holmes	General; James M. Holmes (born 1957)	10 March 2017	28 August 2020	3 years, 171 days
13	Mark D. Kelly	General; Mark D. Kelly (born 1962)	28 August 2020	29 February 2024	3 years, 185 days
14	Kenneth S. Wilsbach	General; Kenneth S. Wilsbach (born c. 1963)	29 February 2024	11 August 2025	1 year, 164 days
15	Adrian L. Spain	General; Adrian L. Spain (born c. 1972)	11 August 2025	Incumbent	1 year, 42 days

== See also ==
U.S. Armed Forces operations commands

- United States Army Forces Command
- United States Marine Corps Forces Command
- United States Fleet Forces Command
- Space Operations Command
