= Ronald Keys =

United States Air Force general

Ronald Ellis Keys
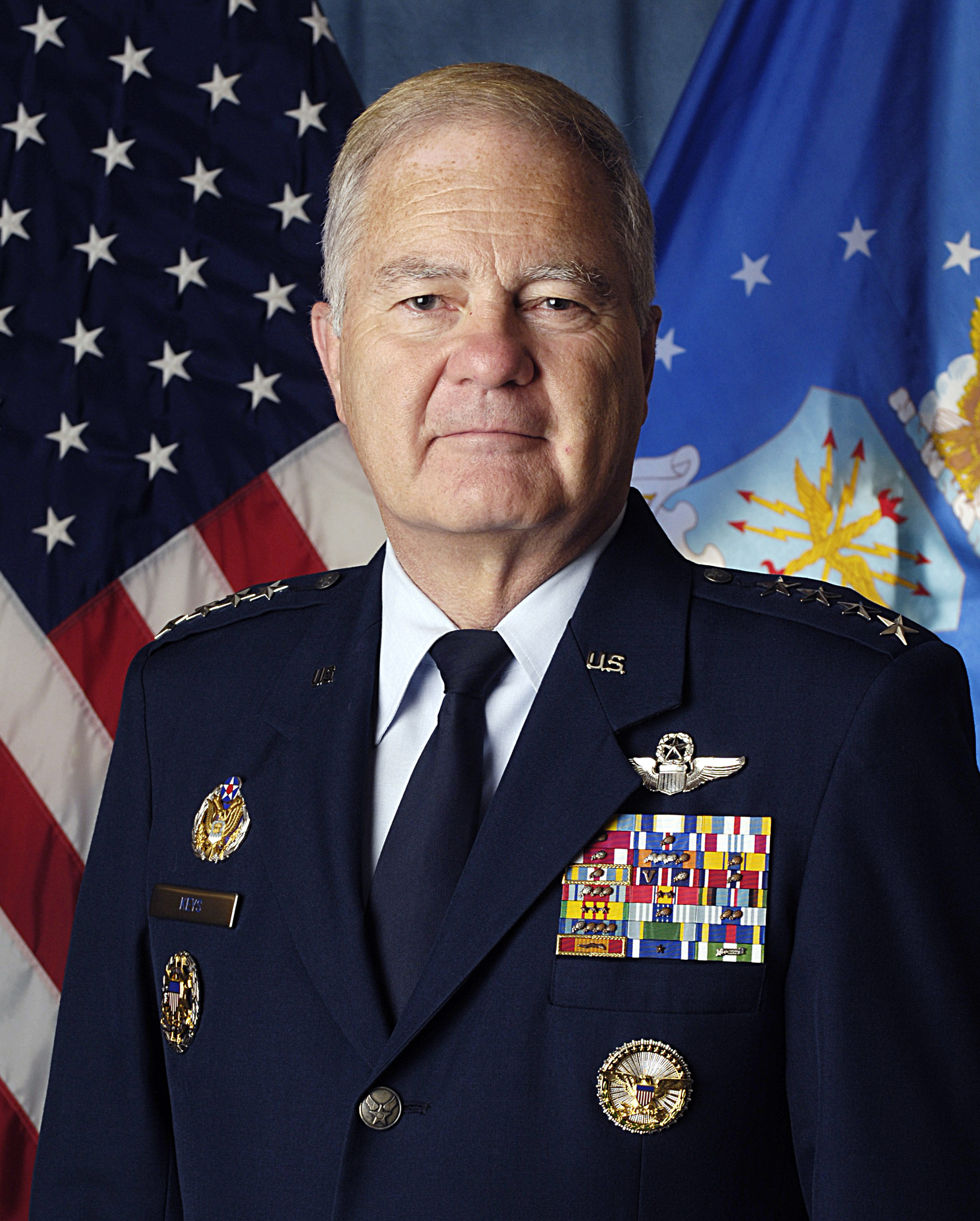
- Keys in 2007
- Born: 3 February 1945 (age 81); Kansas, United States
- Military career
- Allegiance: United States
- Branch: United States Air Force
- Service years: 1967–2007
- Rank: General
- Commands: Air Combat Command; Allied Air Forces Southern Europe; 16th Air Force; Air Force Doctrine Center; 53rd Wing; 354th Fighter Wing; 36th Fighter Wing; USAF Fighter Weapons School; 71st Tactical Fighter Squadron
- Conflicts: Vietnam War
- Awards: Defense Distinguished Service Medal (2); Air Force Distinguished Service Medal; Defense Superior Service Medal; Legion of Merit (2); Distinguished Flying Cross (2)

General Ronald Ellis Keys (born 3 February 1945) is a retired United States Air Force officer who served as Commander, Air Combat Command, with headquarters in Langley Air Force Base, Virginia, and Air Component Commander for United States Joint Forces Command and United States Northern Command.

== Military career ==
Keys was responsible for organizing, training, equipping and maintaining combat-ready forces for rapid deployment and employment, while ensuring strategic air defense forces are ready to meet the challenges of peacetime air sovereignty and wartime defense. At the time, ACC operated more than 1,100 aircraft, 25 wings, 15 bases and more than 200 operating locations worldwide with 105,000 active-duty and civilian personnel. When mobilized, the Air National Guard and Air Force Reserve contributed more than 800 aircraft and 75,000 people to Air Combat Command.

As the Combat Air Forces lead agent, ACC develops strategy, doctrine, concepts, tactics and procedures for air and space power employment. The command provides conventional, nuclear and information warfare forces to all unified commands to ensure air, space and information superiority for warfighters and national decision-makers. ACC can also be called upon to assist national agencies with intelligence, surveillance and crisis response capabilities.

Keys, a distinguished graduate of Kansas State University's ROTC program, was commissioned in 1967 and was an outstanding graduate of undergraduate pilot training. He has commanded a fighter squadron, the United States Air Force Fighter Weapons School, an F-15 wing, an A/OA-10 and F-16 wing, the Combat Air Forces Operational Test and Evaluation Wing, a numbered air force, and Allied Air Forces Southern Europe.

Additionally, Keys was the first commander of the Air Force Doctrine Center, and he has served as an executive assistant to the Air Force Chief of Staff and to an Assistant Secretary of Defense. Prior to his current assignment, he was Deputy Chief of Staff for Air and Space Operations, Headquarters U.S. Air Force, Washington, D.C.

In 2002, Keys was Chairman of the Joint Chiefs of Staff Richard B. Myers' choice to succeed Lieutenant General Gregory S. Newbold as director of operations (J-3) for the Joint Staff. By long-standing tradition, the chairman of the Joint Chiefs had been allowed to select his own top subordinates, but Defense Secretary Donald H. Rumsfeld adopted a sharply different practice of personally interviewing all candidates for three- and four-star rank. Rumsfeld vetoed Keys' appointment after two interviews, forcing Myers to select Lieutenant General Norton A. Schwartz instead. The failure of Keys' nomination was subsequently recounted by senior military officers as an illustration of strained civilian-military relations at the Pentagon under Rumsfeld's leadership.

Keys is a command pilot with more than 4,000 flying hours, including more than 300 hours of combat time in Southeast Asia.

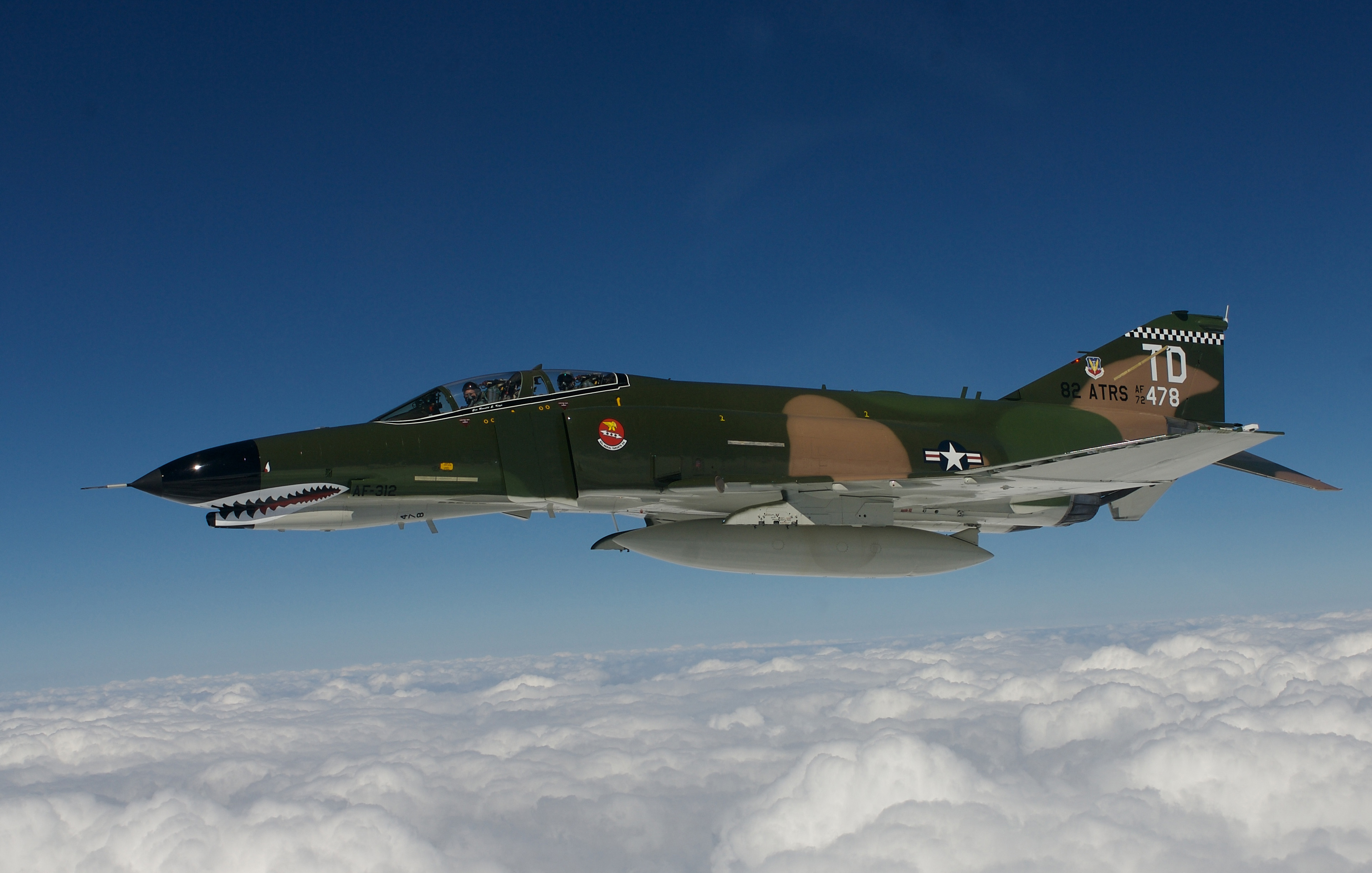
Keys, the commander of Air Combat Command, and Lt. Col. J.D. Lee fly an F-4 Phantom II aircraft over the Atlantic Ocean on 28 September 2007, during the final flight of Key's military career. Keys is scheduled to retire after 40 years of military service. (U.S. Air Force photo by Staff Sgt. Samuel Rogers) (Released)

General Keys retired on 1 November 2007.

== Education ==
- 1967 Bachelor's degree in entomology, Kansas State University, Manhattan
- 1971 Squadron Officer School
- 1974 Air Command and Staff College
- 1978 Master's degree in business administration, Golden Gate University, San Francisco, Calif.
- 1988 Air War College, Maxwell AFB, Ala.

== Flight information ==
- Rating: Command pilot
- Flight hours: More than 4,000
- Aircraft flown: A-10, F-4, F-15 Eagle and F-16 Fighting Falcon

== Awards and decorations ==
| US Air Force Command Pilot Badge |
| Office of the Joint Chiefs of Staff Identification Badge |
| Office of the Secretary of Defense Identification Badge |

| Defense Distinguished Service Medal with one bronze oak leaf cluster |
| Air Force Distinguished Service Medal |
| Defense Superior Service Medal |
| Legion of Merit with oak leaf cluster |
| Distinguished Flying Cross with oak leaf cluster |
| Defense Meritorious Service Medal |
| Meritorious Service Medal with silver oak leaf cluster |
| Air Medal with three silver and one bronze oak leaf cluster |
| Air Force Commendation Medal with oak leaf cluster |
| Joint Meritorious Unit Award with oak leaf cluster |
| Air Force Outstanding Unit Award with Valor device and silver oak leaf cluster |
| Air Force Organizational Excellence Award with oak leaf cluster |
| Combat Readiness Medal with one silver and two bronze oak leaf clusters |
| National Defense Service Medal with two bronze service stars |
| Armed Forces Expeditionary Medal |
| Vietnam Service Medal with three service stars |
| Air Force Overseas Short Tour Service Ribbon with oak leaf cluster |
| Air Force Overseas Long Tour Service Ribbon with two oak leaf clusters |
| Air Force Longevity Service Award with one silver and three bronze oak leaf clusters |
| Air Force Longevity Service Award (second ribbon to denote tenth award) |
| Small Arms Expert Marksmanship Ribbon |
| Air Force Training Ribbon |
| Vietnam Gallantry Cross Unit Citation |
| NATO Medal for Former Yugoslavia with service star |
| Vietnam Campaign Medal |
