= Leadership of the United States Transportation Command =

U.S. Transportation Command leadership

Seal of the United States Transportation Command

This is a list of all commanders, deputy commanders, senior enlisted leaders, and chiefs of staff of the United States Transportation Command.

== Current combatant command staff ==
- Randall Reed, Commander
  - Jered Helwig, Deputy Commander
    - Kristin Acquavella, Chief of Staff
      - Will Cooper, Director, Manpower and Personnel (TCJ1)
      - Daniel Tulley, Director, Operations (TCJ3)
        - Robert Brisson, Deputy Director, Operations
        - Joshua M. Olson, Chief, Global Operations Center
      - Derek A. Trinque, Director, Strategy, Capabilities, Policy, Programs, and Logistics (TCJ5/4)
        - Mark A. Cyr, Deputy Director, Strategy, Capabilities, Policy, Programs, and Logistics
      - Terri Dilly, Chief Financial Officer and Director, Program Analysis and Financial Management (TCJ8)

== List of leaders of the United States Transportation Command ==
=== Commanders ===
Commander of the United States Transportation Command
- Emblem of the United States Transportation Command

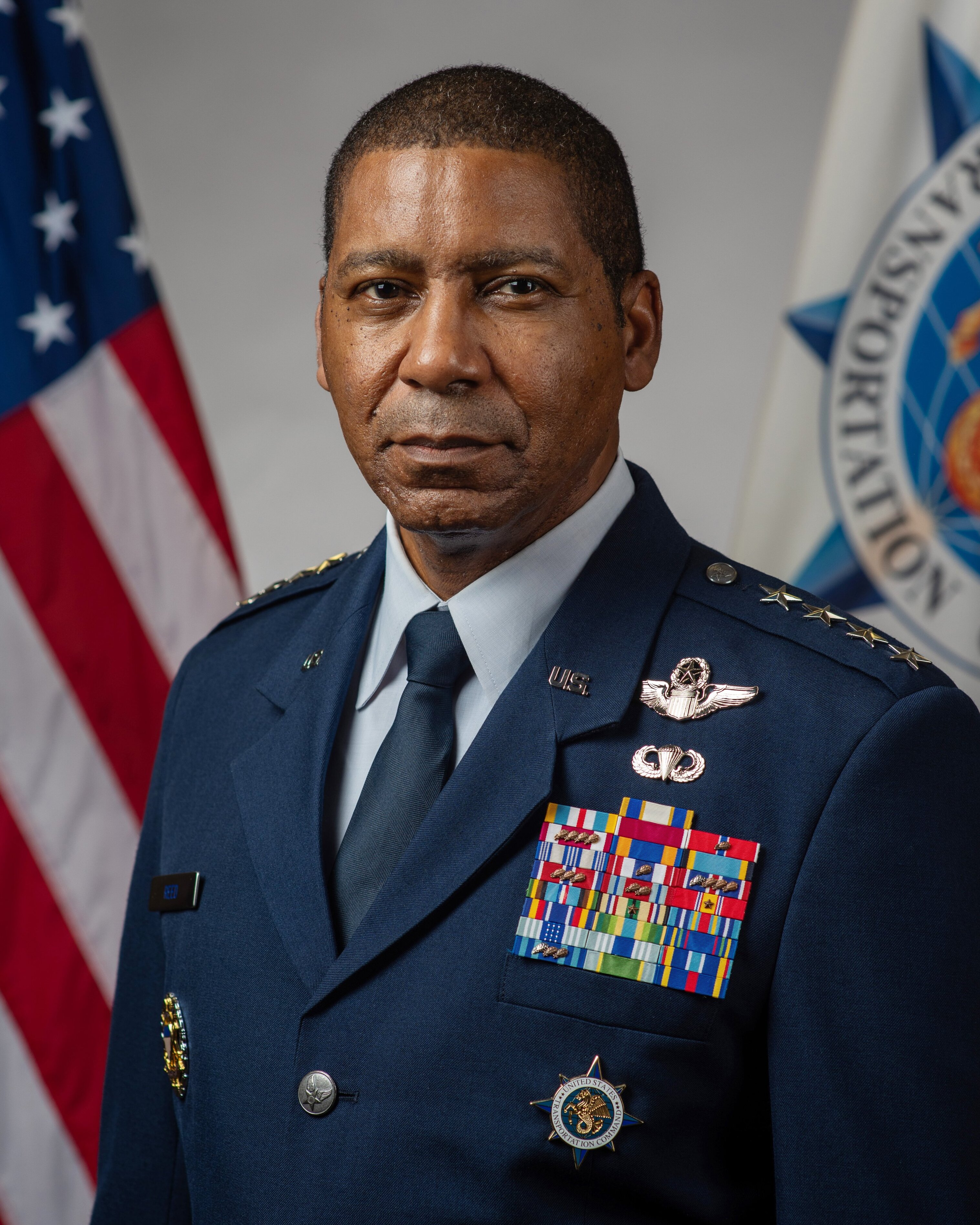
- Incumbent; General Randall Reed, USAF since 4 October 2024
- United States Department of Defense
- Type: Unified combatant commander
- Abbreviation: CDRUSTRANSCOM
- Reports to: President of the United States; Secretary of Defense
- Seat: Scott Air Force Base, Illinois, U.S.
- Nominator: Secretary of Defense
- Appointer: The president with Senate advice and consent
- Term length: 2–3 years (approx.)
- Constituting instrument: 10 U.S.C. § 164
- Formation: 1 July 1987
- First holder: Duane H. Cassidy
- Deputy: Deputy Commander, United States Transportation Command

No.	Commander		Term			Service branch
No.	Portrait	Name	Took office	Left office	Term length	Service branch
1	Duane H. Cassidy	General; Duane H. Cassidy (1933–2016)	1 July 1987	21 September 1989	2 years, 82 days	U.S. Air Force
2	Hansford T. Johnson	General; Hansford T. Johnson (born 1936)	22 September 1989	24 August 1992	2 years, 337 days	U.S. Air Force
3	Ronald Fogleman	General; Ronald Fogleman (born 1942)	25 August 1992	17 October 1994	2 years, 53 days	U.S. Air Force
4	Robert L. Rutherford	General; Robert L. Rutherford (1938–2013)	18 October 1994	14 July 1996	1 year, 270 days	U.S. Air Force
5	Walter Kross	General; Walter Kross (born 1942)	15 July 1996	2 August 1998	2 years, 18 days	U.S. Air Force
6	Charles T. Robertson Jr.	General; Charles T. Robertson Jr. (born 1946)	3 August 1998	5 November 2001	3 years, 94 days	U.S. Air Force
7	John W. Handy	General; John W. Handy (born 1944)	5 November 2001	7 September 2005	3 years, 306 days	U.S. Air Force
8	Norton A. Schwartz	General; Norton A. Schwartz (born 1951)	7 September 2005	11 August 2008	2 years, 339 days	U.S. Air Force
–	Ann E. Rondeau	Vice Admiral; Ann E. Rondeau (born 1951); Acting	12 August 2008	5 September 2008	23 days	U.S. Navy
9	Duncan McNabb	General; Duncan McNabb (born 1952)	5 September 2008	14 October 2011	3 years, 39 days	U.S. Air Force
10	William M. Fraser III	General; William M. Fraser III (born 1952)	14 October 2011	5 May 2014	2 years, 203 days	U.S. Air Force
11	Paul J. Selva	General; Paul J. Selva (born 1958)	5 May 2014	31 July 2015	1 year, 87 days	U.S. Air Force
–	William A. Brown	Vice Admiral; William A. Brown (born 1960); Acting	31 July 2015	26 August 2015	26 days	U.S. Navy
12	Darren W. McDew	General; Darren W. McDew (born 1960)	26 August 2015	28 August 2018	3 years, 2 days	U.S. Air Force
13	Stephen R. Lyons	General; Stephen R. Lyons	24 August 2018	15 October 2021	3 years, 52 days	U.S. Army
14	Jacqueline Van Ovost	General; Jacqueline Van Ovost (born 1965)	15 October 2021	4 October 2024	2 years, 355 days	U.S. Air Force
15	Randall Reed	General; Randall Reed (born c. 1967)	4 October 2024	Incumbent	1 year, 338 days	U.S. Air Force

=== Deputy commanders ===
No.	Deputy Commander		Term			Service branch
No.	Portrait	Name	Took office	Left office	Term length	Service branch
1	Albert J. Herberger	Vice Admiral; Albert J. Herberger (1931–2022)	September 1987	February 1990	~2 years, 153 days	U.S. Navy
2	Paul D. Butcher	Vice Admiral; Paul D. Butcher (born c. 1931)	February 1990	March 1991	~1 year, 28 days	U.S. Navy
3	James D. Starling	Lieutenant General; James D. Starling (born 1936)	17 June 1991	30 August 1993	2 years, 74 days	U.S. Army
4	Kenneth R. Wykle	Lieutenant General; Kenneth R. Wykle (born 1941)	30 August 1993	September 1995	~2 years, 16 days	U.S. Army
5	Hubert G. Smith	Lieutenant General; Hubert G. Smith (born c. 1940)	September 1995	August 1997	~1 year, 334 days	U.S. Army
6	Roger G. Thompson Jr.	Lieutenant General; Roger G. Thompson Jr.	August 1997	October 1999	~2 years, 61 days	U.S. Army
7	Daniel G. Brown	Lieutenant General; Daniel G. Brown	October 1999	29 August 2002	~2 years, 318 days	U.S. Army
8	Gary H. Hughey	Lieutenant General; Gary H. Hughey (born c. 1948)	29 August 2002	18 November 2004	2 years, 81 days	U.S. Marine Corps
9	Robert T. Dail	Lieutenant General; Robert T. Dail (born 1953)	18 November 2004	August 2006	~1 year, 270 days	U.S. Army
10	Ann E. Rondeau	Vice Admiral; Ann E. Rondeau (born 1951)	December 2006	June 2009	~2 years, 182 days	U.S. Navy
11	Mark D. Harnitchek	Vice Admiral; Mark D. Harnitchek (born 1955)	June 2009	August 2011	~2 years, 61 days	U.S. Navy
12	Kathleen M. Gainey	Lieutenant General; Kathleen M. Gainey (born 1956)	August 2011	13 October 2013	~2 years, 59 days	U.S. Army
13	William A. Brown	Vice Admiral; William A. Brown (born 1958)	13 October 2013	24 August 2015	1 year, 315 days	U.S. Navy
14	Stephen R. Lyons	Lieutenant General; Stephen R. Lyons (born 1961)	24 August 2015	August 2017	~1 year, 356 days	U.S. Army
15	John J. Broadmeadow	Lieutenant General; John J. Broadmeadow (born c. 1961)	August 2017	2 July 2019	~1 year, 321 days	U.S. Marine Corps
16	Dee Mewbourne	Vice Admiral; Dee Mewbourne (born 1961)	2 July 2019	29 July 2022	3 years, 27 days	U.S. Navy
17	John P. Sullivan	Lieutenant General; John P. Sullivan (born c. 1966)	29 July 2022	18 July 2024	1 year, 355 days	U.S. Army
18	Jered Helwig	Lieutenant General; Jered Helwig	18 July 2024	Incumbent	2 years, 51 days	U.S. Army

=== Senior enlisted leaders ===
No.	Senior enlisted leader		Term			Service branch
No.	Portrait	Name	Took office	Left office	Term length	Service branch
1	Kenneth J. McQuiston	Chief Master Sergeant; Kenneth J. McQuiston	21 February 2006	12 November 2009	3 years, 264 days	U.S. Air Force
2	Tomás R. Hawkins	Command Sergeant Major; Tomás R. Hawkins	10 December 2009	10 November 2011	1 year, 335 days	U.S. Army
3	Martin S. Klukas	Chief Master Sergeant; Martin S. Klukas	10 November 2011	28 March 2014	2 years, 138 days	U.S. Air Force
4	William W. Turner	Chief Master Sergeant; William W. Turner	28 March 2014	10 May 2016	2 years, 43 days	U.S. Air Force
5	Matthew M. Caruso	Chief Master Sergeant; Matthew M. Caruso	10 May 2016	1 November 2018	2 years, 175 days	U.S. Air Force
6	Jason L. France	Chief Master Sergeant; Jason L. France	1 November 2018	30 March 2021	2 years, 149 days	U.S. Air Force
7	Donald O. Myrick	Fleet Master Chief; Donald O. Myrick	30 March 2021	6 July 2023	2 years, 98 days	U.S. Navy
8	Brian P. Kruzelnick	Chief Master Sergeant; Brian P. Kruzelnick	6 July 2023	Incumbent	3 years, 63 days	U.S. Air Force

=== Chiefs of staff ===
No.	Chief of Staff		Term			Service branch
No.	Portrait	Name	Took office	Left office	Term length	Service branch
1	Carlos D. Pair	Major General; Carlos D. Pair (1949–2022)	19 June 2000	December 2005	~5 years, 179 days	U.S. Army
3	William H. Johnson	Major General; William H. Johnson	18 January 2006	13 August 2010	~4 years, 210 days	U.S. Army
4	Gregory E. Couch	Major General; Gregory E. Couch (born c. 1957)	August 2010	31 March 2014	~3 years, 228 days	U.S. Army
5	David G. Clarkson	Major General; David G. Clarkson (born c. 1960)	31 March 2014	22 February 2017	2 years, 328 days	U.S. Army
6	John C. Flournoy Jr.	Major General; John C. Flournoy Jr. (born c. 1964)	22 February 2017	7 June 2019	2 years, 105 days	U.S. Air Force
7	Deborah Kotulich	Major General; Deborah Kotulich (born c. 1968)	7 June 2019	May 2021	~1 year, 334 days	U.S. Army
8	Vincent B. Barker	Major General; Vincent B. Barker (born c. 1964)	May 2021	19 May 2023	~2 years, 4 days	U.S. Army
9	Susan E. Henderson	Major General; Susan E. Henderson (born c. 1967)	19 May 2023	11 June 2025	2 years, 23 days	U.S. Army
10	Kristin Acquavella	Rear Admiral; Kristin Acquavella	11 June 2025	Incumbent	1 year, 88 days	U.S. Navy

== See also ==
- United States Transportation Command
- Leadership of the United States Africa Command
- Leadership of the United States European Command
- Leadership of the United States Indo-Pacific Command
- Leadership of the United States Northern Command
- Leadership of the United States Space Command
- Leadership of the United States Cyber Command
- Leadership of the United States Strategic Command
