= Kenneth Council =

U.S. Air Force general

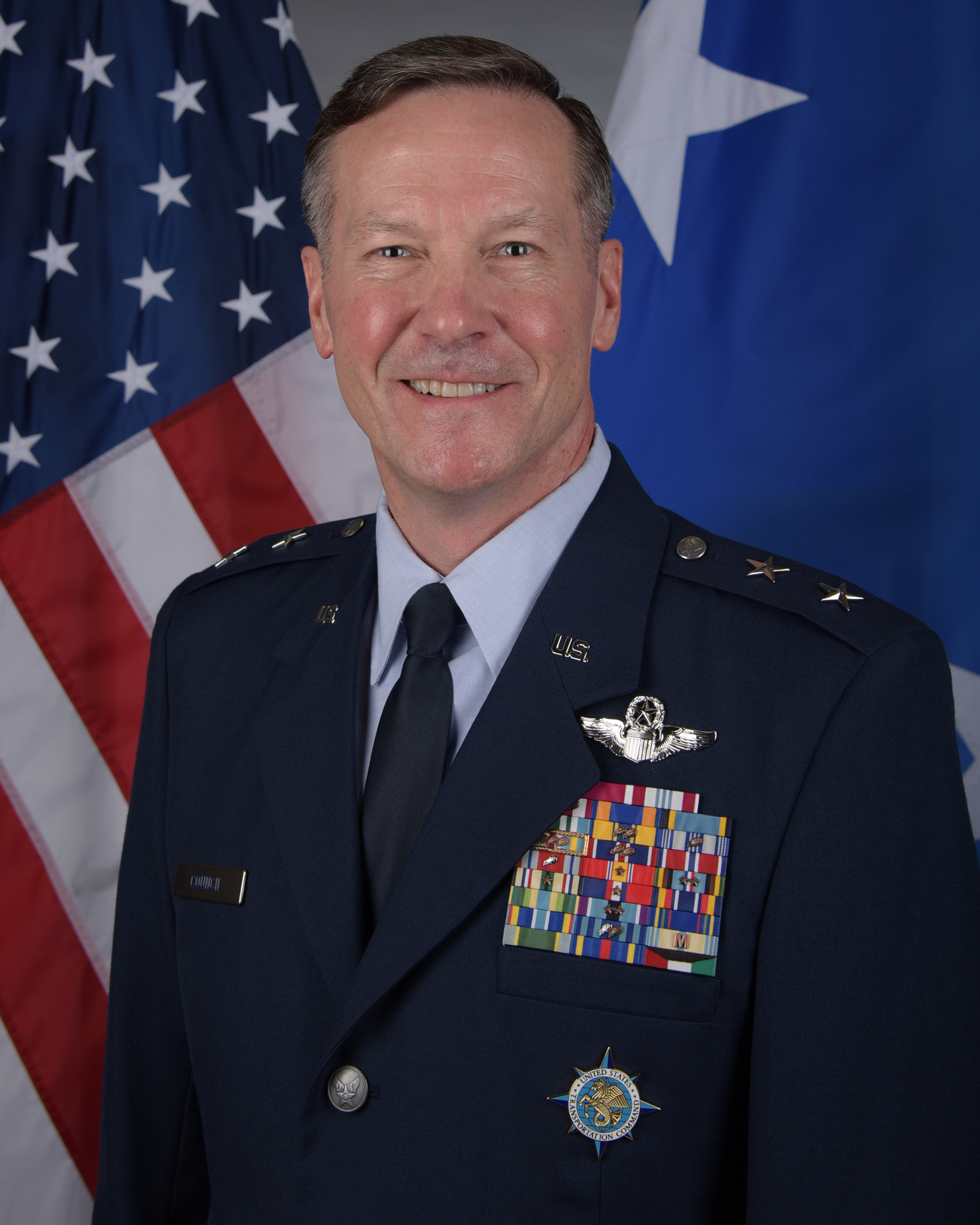
- Official portrait, 2021
- Born: Thomasville, Georgia
- Military career
- Allegiance: United States
- Branch: United States Air Force
- Service years: 1989–2023
- Rank: Major general
- Commands: Joint Transportation Reserve Unit; 445th Operations Group
- Awards: Legion of Merit

Kenneth R. Council Jr. is a retired United States Air Force major general who served as the mobilization assistant to the commander of Air Mobility Command from July 2021 to July 2023. He most recently served as the 14th mobilization assistant to the commander of the United States Transportation Command and commander of the Joint Transportation Reserve Unit from June 7, 2019. Previously, he was the individual mobilization augmentee to the commander of the Eighteenth Air Force from August 2017 to June 2019. Ken is a graduate of Embry-Riddle Aeronautical University.

Military offices
Preceded by Daniel R. Ammerman	Mobilization Assistant to the Commander of United States Transportation Command and Commander of the Joint Transportation Reserve Unit; 2019–2021	Succeeded by Cheryn L. Fasano
Preceded by John B. Williams	Mobilization Assistant to the Commander of Air Mobility Command; 2021–2023	Succeeded by Adrian K. White
