= John W. Handy =

US Air Force general

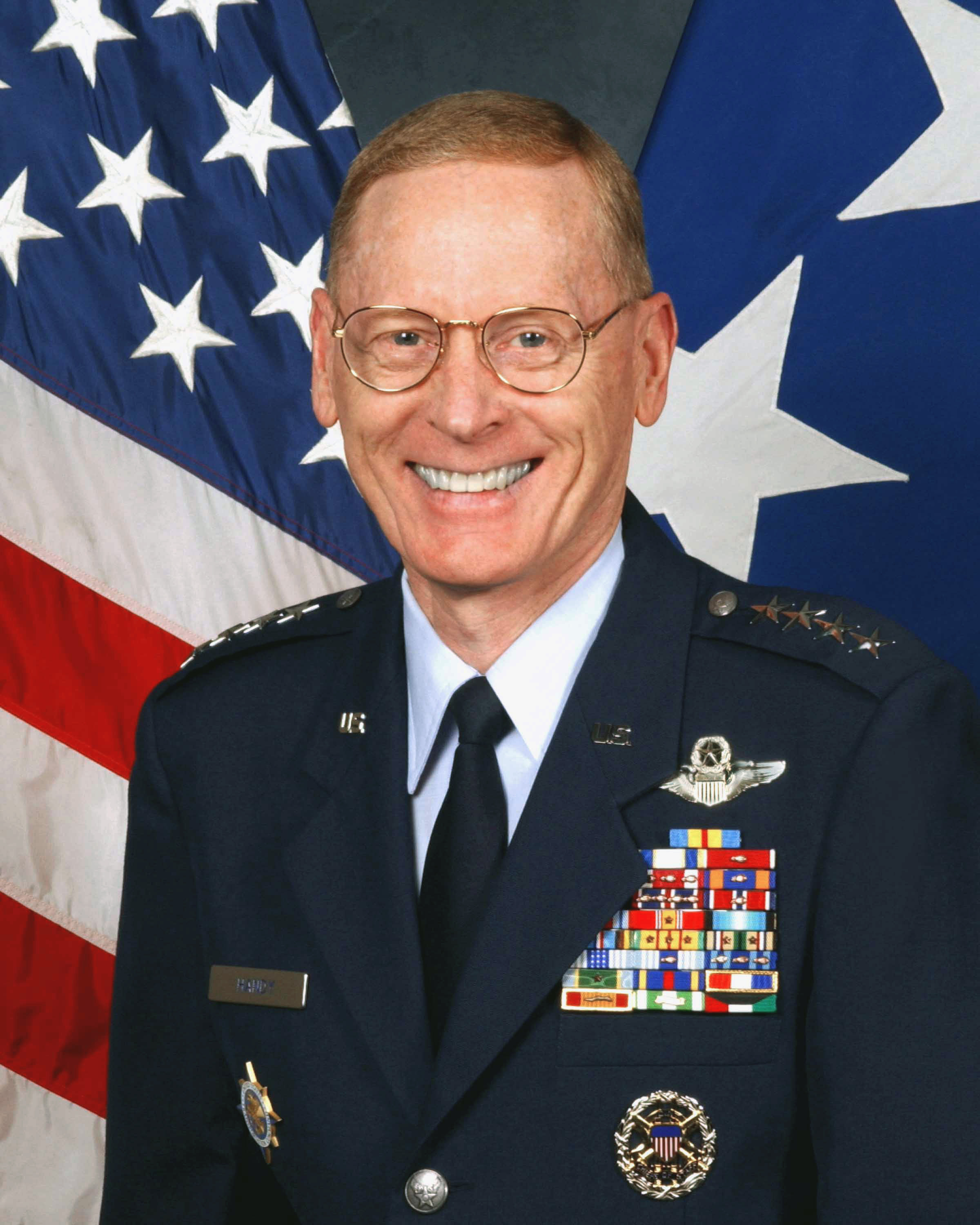
- Official portrait, 2003
- Born: 29 April 1944 (age 82); Raleigh, North Carolina, U.S.
- Military career
- Allegiance: United States
- Branch: United States Air Force
- Service years: 1967–2005
- Rank: General
- Commands: United States Transportation Command; Air Mobility Command; Vice Chief of Staff of the United States Air Force; 21st Air Force; Tanker Airlift Control Center
- Conflicts: Vietnam War; Gulf War
- Awards: Defense Distinguished Service Medal (2); Air Force Distinguished Service Medal; Legion of Merit (2)

John William Handy (born 29 April 1944) is a retired United States Air Force officer. Serving from 1967 to 2005, he reached the rank of general and held a number of high-ranking commands.

Handy was commissioned in 1967, and received his pilot wings in 1968. His early commands included the 21st Air Force at McGuire Air Force Base, New Jersey; the Air Mobility Command's Tanker Airlift Control Center; two airlift wings; and a maintenance squadron. He then served as director of operations and logistics for the United States Transportation Command; director of programs and evaluations; and deputy chief of staff for installations and logistics with the Air Staff in Washington, D.C. His final two postings were as Vice Chief of Staff of the United States Air Force, from 2000 to 2001, and Commander of the United States Transportation Command and Air Mobility Command, from October 2001 until September 2005.

Handy is a command pilot with more than 5,000 flying hours, principally in airlift aircraft. As a C-130 Hercules pilot, he logged more than 300 combat hours in Southeast Asia.

== Education ==
- 1966 Bachelor of Arts degree in history, Methodist College, Fayetteville, North Carolina
- 1972 Squadron Officer School
- 1979 Air Command and Staff College
- 1979 Master's degree in systems management, University of Southern California
- 1982 Air War College
- 1984 National War College, Fort Lesley J. McNair, Washington, D.C.
- 1993 Program for Senior Executives, John F. Kennedy School of Government, Harvard University

== Flight information ==
- Rating: Command pilot
- Flight hours: More than 5,000
- Aircraft flown: C-130 Hercules, C-141, C-17, C-7A, C-9, C-37 and KC-10

== Awards and decorations ==
Air Force Command Pilot Badge
Joint Chiefs of Staff Badge
United States Transportation Command Badge

Defense Distinguished Service Medal with one bronze oak leaf cluster
Air Force Distinguished Service Medal
Legion of Merit with one bronze oak leaf cluster
Meritorious Service Medal with three bronze oak leaf clusters
Air Medal
Joint Meritorious Unit Award
Air Force Outstanding Unit Award with four oak leaf clusters
Air Force Organizational Excellence Award with two oak leaf clusters
Combat Readiness Medal
National Defense Service Medal with two bronze service stars
Antarctica Service Medal
Armed Forces Expeditionary Medal
Vietnam Service Medal with three bronze service stars
Southwest Asia Service Medal with two bronze service stars
Air Force Overseas Short Tour Service Ribbon
Air Force Overseas Long Tour Service Ribbon with oak leaf cluster
Air Force Longevity Service Award with one silver and three bronze oak leaf clusters
Small Arms Expert Marksmanship Ribbon
Air Force Training Ribbon
Philippine Presidential Unit Citation
Vietnam Gallantry Cross Unit Award
Vietnam Campaign Medal
Kuwait Liberation Medal (Kuwait)

- 2005 Air Force Order of the Sword.

== Other achievements ==
- 1992 Honorary doctor of humanities, Methodist College

Military offices
Preceded by Lester L. Lyles	Vice Chief of Staff of the United States Air Force; 2000–2001	Succeeded by Robert H. Foglesong
Preceded by Charles T. Robertson Jr.	Commander, United States Transportation Command; 2001–2005	Succeeded by Norton A. Schwartz
