= Norton A. Schwartz =

US Air Force general

Norton Allan Schwartz
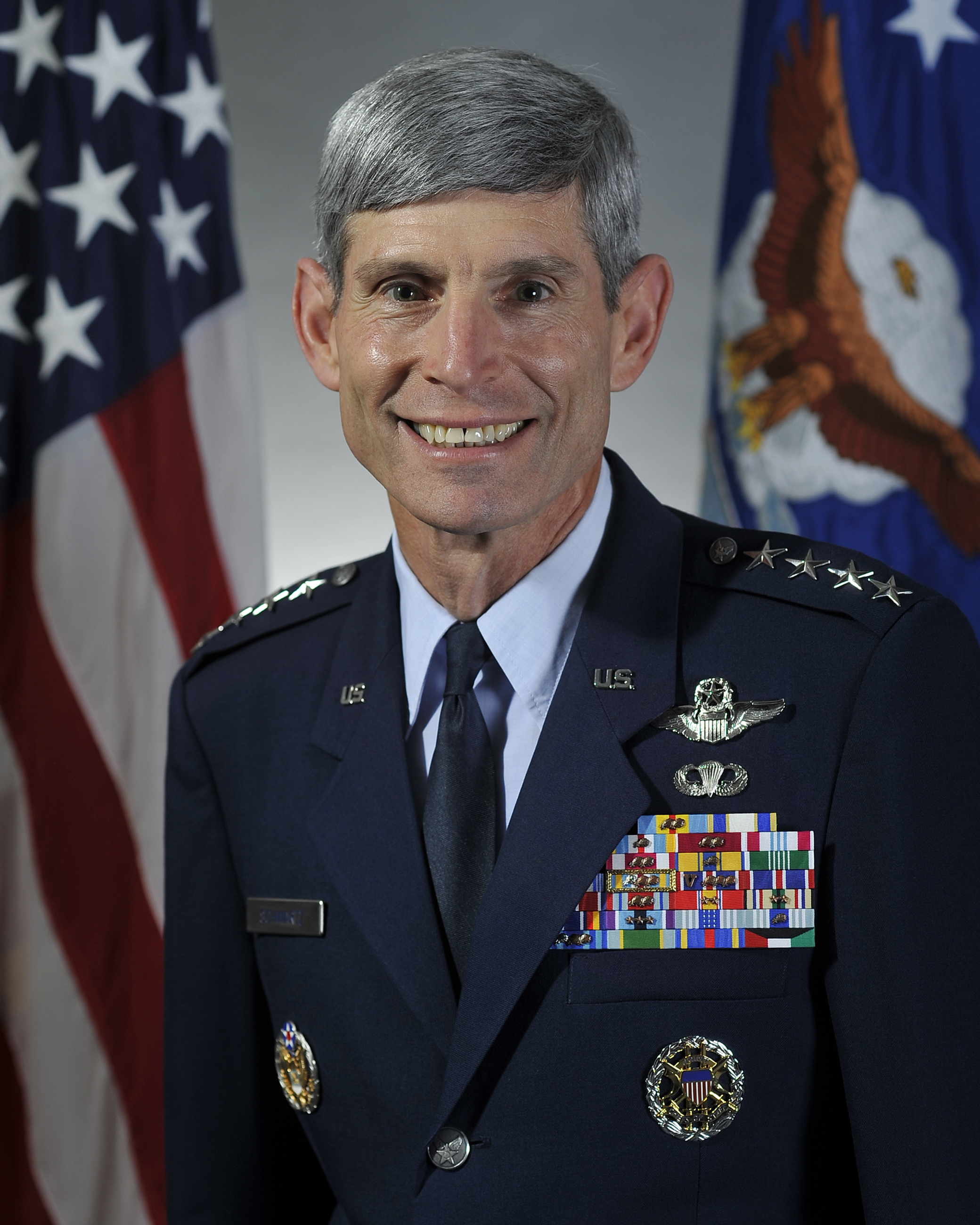
- Schwartz circa 2008
- Born: 14 December 1951 (age 74); Toms River, New Jersey, U.S.
- Military career
- Allegiance: United States
- Branch: United States Air Force
- Service years: 1973–2012
- Rank: General
- Commands: Chief of Staff of the Air Force; U.S. Transportation Command; Eleventh Air Force; Alaskan Command; U.S. Special Operations Command-Pacific; 16th Special Operations Wing; 36th Airlift Squadron
- Conflicts: Gulf War
- Awards: Defense Distinguished Service Medal (4); Air Force Distinguished Service Medal (2); Defense Superior Service Medal (2); Legion of Merit (3); Defense Meritorious Service Medal; Meritorious Service Medal (3); Full list
- Norton A. Schwartz's voice Schwartz testifies on making the chief of the National Guard Bureau a statutory member of the Joint Chiefs of Staff; Recorded 10 November 2011

Norton Allan Schwartz (born 14 December 1951) is a retired United States Air Force general who served as the 19th chief of staff of the Air Force from 12 August 2008, until his retirement in 2012. He previously served as commander, United States Transportation Command from September 2005 to August 2008. He is currently the president and CEO of the Institute for Defense Analyses, serving since 2 January 2020.

== Early life ==
Schwartz grew up in Toms River, New Jersey, the son of Simon Schwartz who owned and operated Charney's office supply store in town. He graduated from Toms River High School (now South) in 1969 and played as an end on the school's football team during its 1968 9-0 undefeated season.

== Military career ==
After high school, Schwartz attended the United States Air Force Academy, graduating in 1973. While a cadet, he sang in the Academy's Jewish choir. He is an alumnus of the National War College, a member of the Council on Foreign Relations, and a 1994 Fellow of the Massachusetts Institute of Technology's Seminar XXI.

Schwartz is a USAF Command Pilot with more than 4,400 flying hours in a variety of aircraft. He has flown C-130 Hercules and MC-130 Combat Talon I and Combat Talon II aircraft and MH-53 Pave Low III and Pave Low IV, and MH-60 Black Hawk and Pave Hawk special ops helicopters. His operational background goes back to the final days of the Vietnam War; at the time, he was a crew member taking part in the 1975 airlift evacuation of Saigon. In 1991 he served as chief of staff of the Joint Special Operations Task Force for Northern Iraq in operations Desert Shield and Desert Storm. In 1997, he led the Joint Task Force that prepared for the noncombatant evacuation of U.S. citizens in Cambodia. On January 12, 2000, Schwartz was promoted to lieutenant general and received his third-star upon assuming the command of Alaskan Command and Eleventh Air Force.

=== 9/11 attacks ===
During the attacks on 11 September 2001, General Schwartz at that time was the commander of Alaskan Command, a joint subordinate unified command of North American Aerospace Defense Command (NORAD) which oversees the state of Alaska. At the time of those attacks, all air traffic in United States airspace had been grounded, and most of the flights were being diverted to Canada as part of Operation Yellow Ribbon in response to the attacks. However one aircraft, a Korean Air Boeing 747-400 Flight 85 which was en route to Anchorage International Airport for a stopover with its final destination in New York, John F. Kennedy International Airport, suddenly reported being hijacked and began transmitting the international hijack transponder code. Lieutenant General Schwartz, who was in charge of the Alaskan Command at that time, ordered and scrambled two F-15 aircraft to intercept Flight 85 and ordered the F-15 pilots to establish direct radio contact with the Flight 85 pilot.

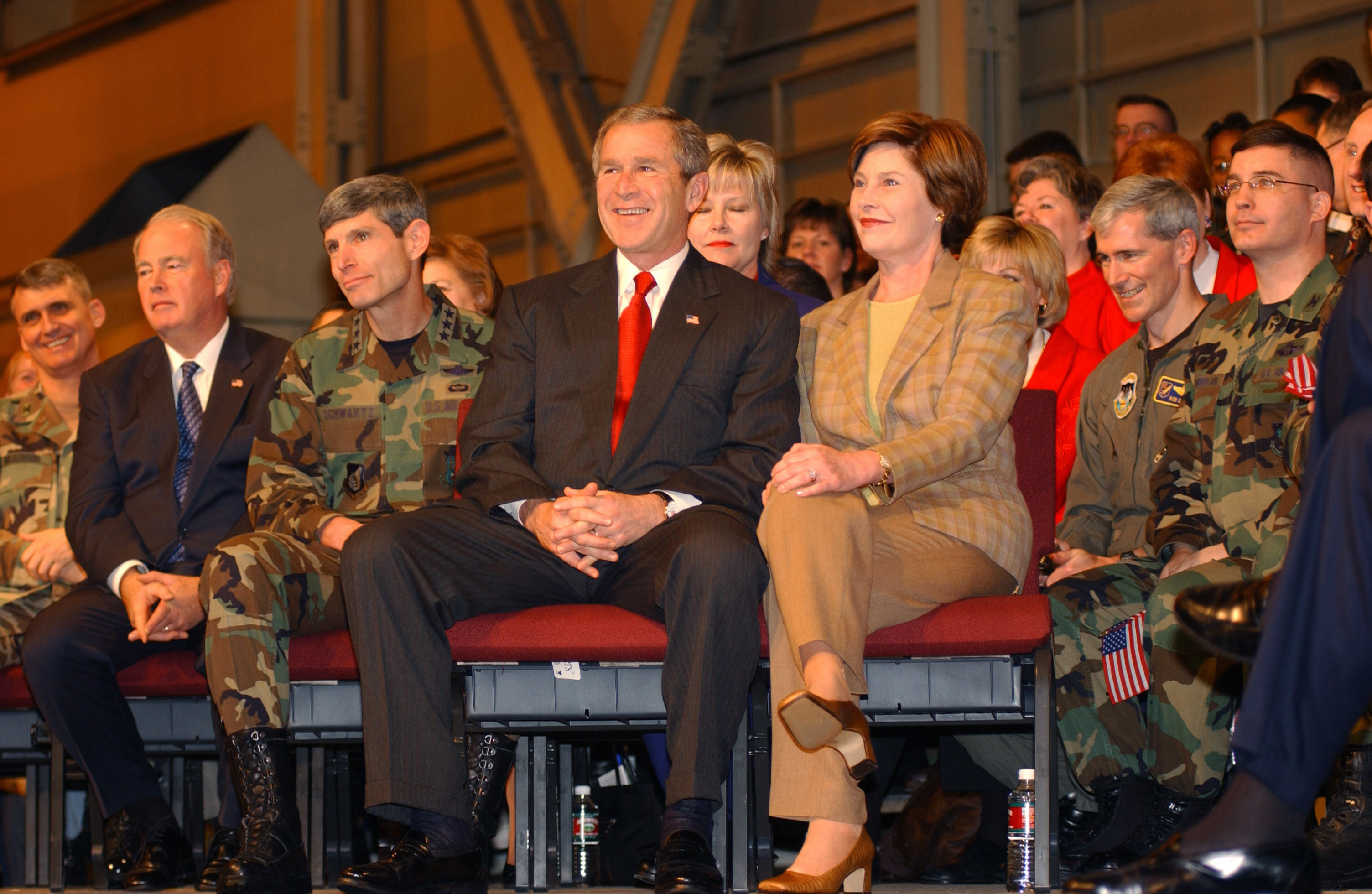
Commander of The Alaskan Command Lieutenant General Norton Schwartz with U.S. President George W. Bush and First-Lady Laura Bush at Elmendorf Air Force Base, Alaska on 16 February 2002

Schwartz then contacted the commander in charge of the Canadian NORAD region, Lieutenant General Angus Watt and discussed the possibility of diverting the Korean Air 747 into Whitehorse, Canada since the 747 was running low on fuel and headed toward U.S. territory. Schwartz also guaranteed that the Korean Air 747 would be escorted by U.S. Air Force fighter aircraft all the way until the plane touched down. Upon receiving approval from the Canadian authority, Watt then allowed the Korean Air Boeing 747 to land at Whitehorse International Airport on the condition that the plane would have to be escorted by the United States Air Force until its landing at Whitehorse. Immediately after landing there, the Boeing 747 was surrounded by the Royal Canadian Mounted Police and the crew was interrogated by the Canadian authority. It was later confirmed that, in fact, it was not a hijacking, but rather a mistaken signal which had been transmitted by the Flight 85 pilot. Many praise Schwartz's decisions and actions in coordinating with the Canadian Authority to divert Flight 85 into Whitehorse, which eventually resulted in saving the lives of 215 passengers on board Flight 85. At that time (during the 9/11 attacks), all US Air Force fighter aircraft which had been scrambled and were patrolling US airspace were given an order to shoot down any hijacked aircraft. Schwartz knew that a distress signal ('squawking' [a transponder code of] "7500", which is a code meaning "hijacked") had been sent by the Flight 85 pilot.

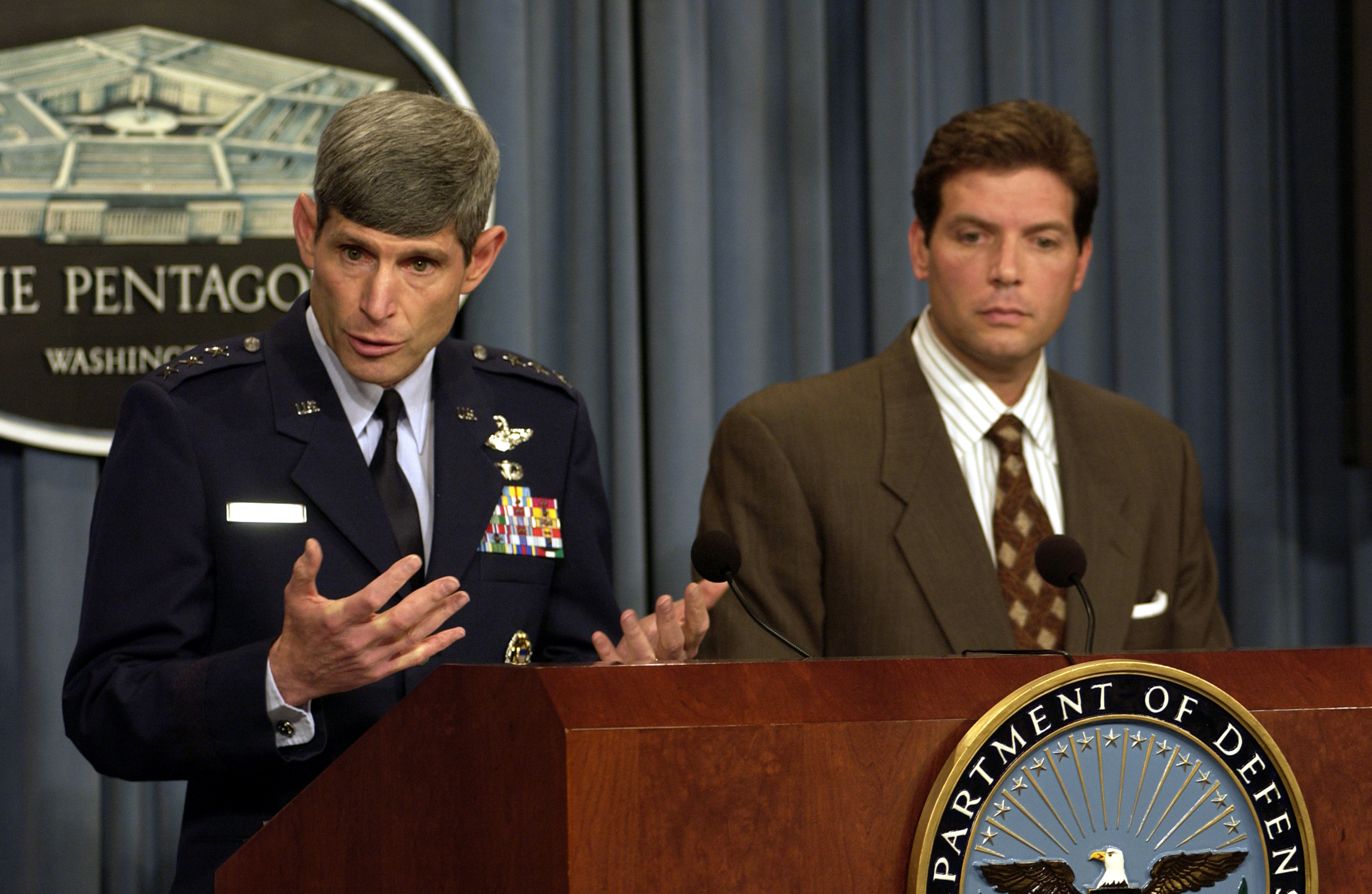
Lieutenant General Norton Schwartz during his tenure as Director of the Joint Staff, at a press briefing in The Pentagon

=== Director of the Joint Staff ===
In October 2002 following the assignment within the Alaskan Command, Lieutenant General Schwartz was promoted into Joint Staff J-3 director for operations which assists the Chairman of The Joint Chiefs of Staff about the current United States Armed Forces operations and plans. In this capacity Schwartz was the senior officer of the Operation Directorate and providing guidance for the Unified Combatant Commanders for every U.S. military operation around the world. In October 2004, following two years assignment as J-3 Operations Directorate, Schwartz was appointed by Chairman of The Joint Chiefs of Staff General Richard B. Myers to be the Director of the Joint Staff (DJS). In this position Schwartz became the three-star officer which assists the Chairman of The Joint Chiefs of Staff in managing the Joint Staff and headed all of the Joint Staff Directorate.

== Commander of the United States Transportation Command ==
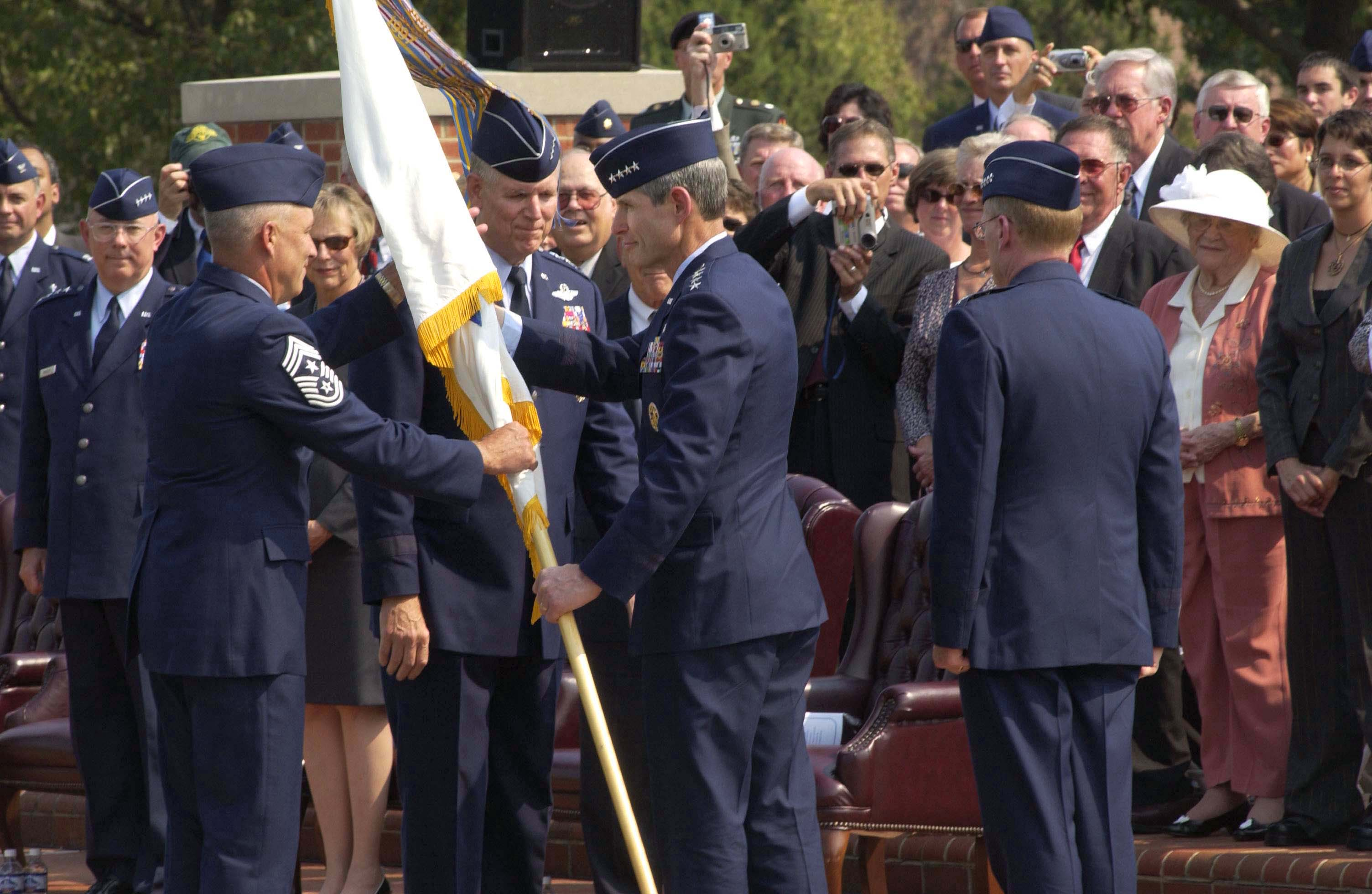
General Norton Schwartz assuming the command of Transportation Command (TRANSCOM) in September 2005

Schwartz was appointed to be the commander of the United States Transportation Command (TRANSCOM) in 2005. Schwartz also received his fourth-star and was promoted into four-star General. As commander of The Transportation Command, General Schwartz oversees the mobilization of all of the service branches and defense agencies transportation and mobility support. General Schwartz also organized the entire Department of Defense transportation network. During his tenured as TRANSCOM Commander General Schwartz also coordinated with commercial airline in cooperation for providing military airlift. Schwartz also held a routine meetings with the Airline CEO in-order to discuss about the Airline company cooperation with the military and the Department of Defense. As a result, many cargo and chartered airline companies help provided so many airlift for military personnel and logistical supports during the Iraq War and War in Afghanistan.

Schwartz also emphasize about the importance of the movement of injured warfighters from the battlefield to medical treatment facilities in-order for them to get immediate and quickly medical treatment. Especially knowing that this was a complex process in which it required close collaboration with doctors, hospitals and evacuation crews. One of General Schwartz's major accomplishment as commander of the Transportation Command was the successful transportation of over 9,900 patients from the United States Central Command area of responsibility which was the key-element area during the Iraq War, war in Afghanistan and war on terrorism and over 16,000 patients globally to a medical treatment facilities. In 2008 following three years of his tenure as Commander of The United States Transportation Command, General Schwartz was actually set to retire from active-duty. However following the nuclear weapons incident in 2007 which resulted in the relieved of Air Force Chief of Staff General T. Michael Moseley, Schwartz was elevated into the position of the United States Air Force Chief of Staff and named his successor.

== Air Force Chief of Staff ==
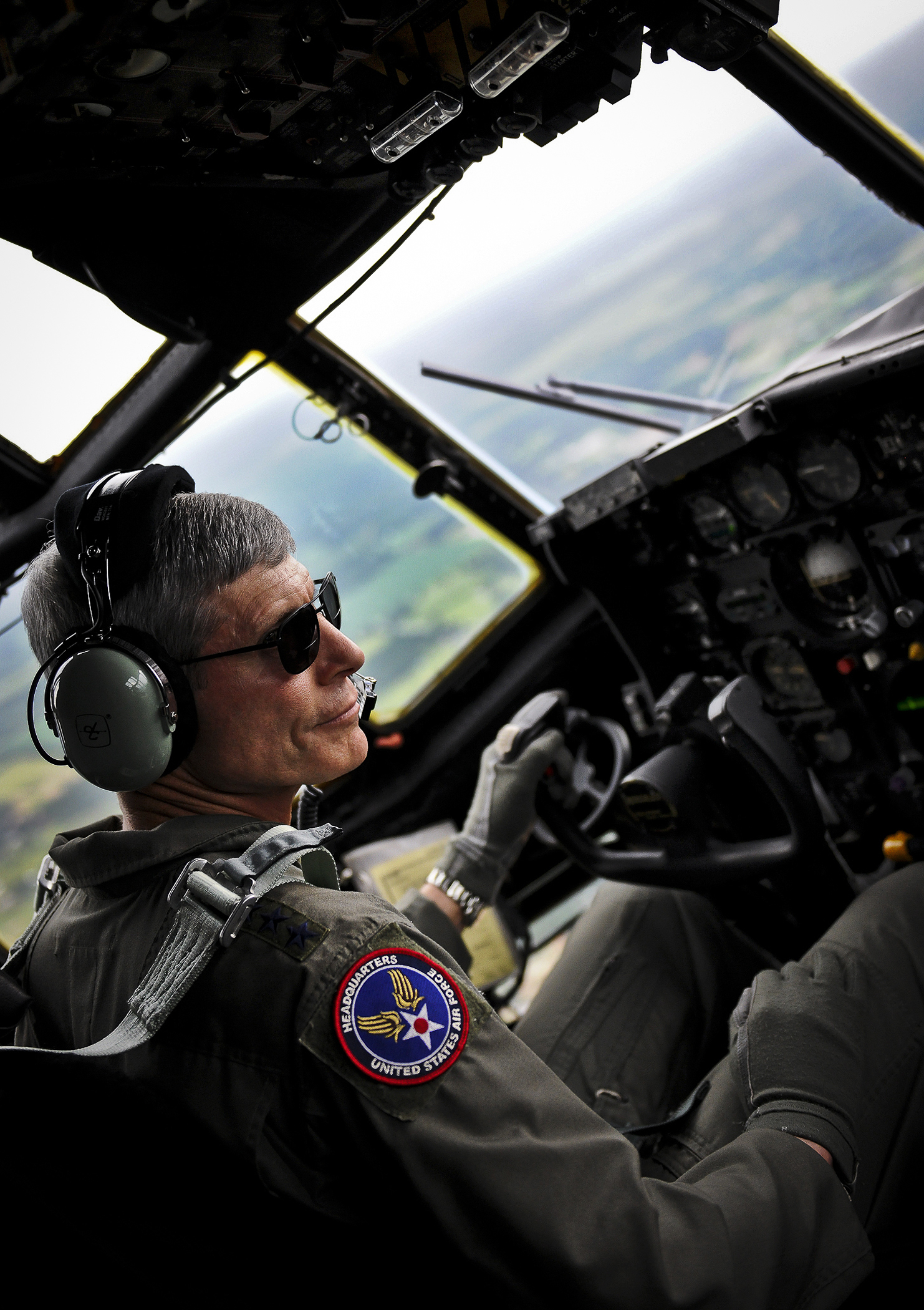
Air Force Chief of Staff General Norton Schwartz flies a Lockheed-Martin C-130 Hercules.

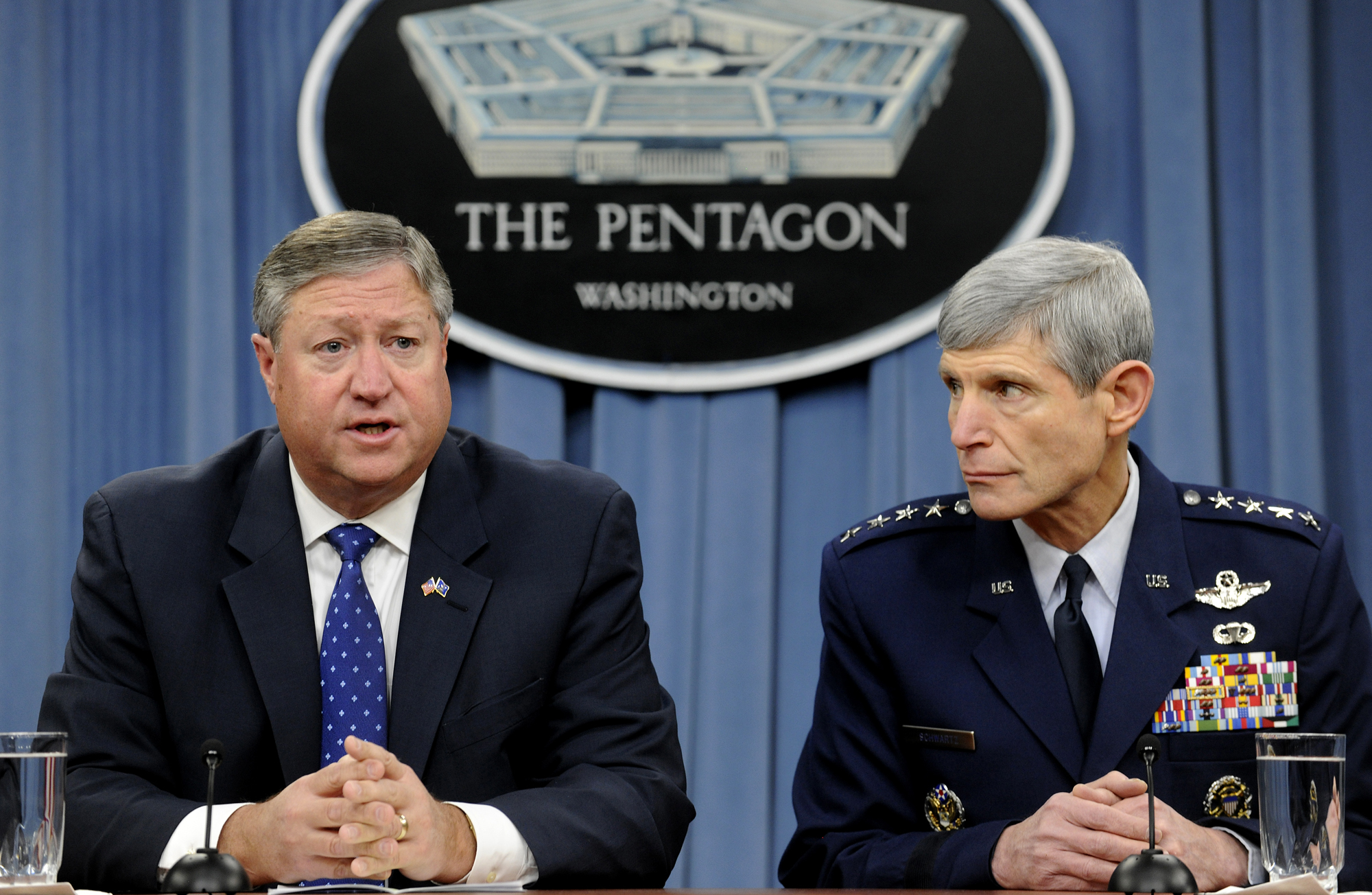
Air Force Chief of Staff General Norton Schwartz and Secretary of the Air Force Michael Donley at The Pentagon in 2012

In June 2008, after General T. Michael Moseley was relieved from his position as Air Force Chief of Staff, Secretary of Defense Robert Gates nominated General Schwartz to be the next Air Force Chief of Staff. General Schwartz is the first Air Force Chief of Staff with a background as an airlift and special operations aircraft pilot. It is speculated that Secretary of Defense Robert Gates selected him because he did not have a background as a fighter or bomber pilot.

As chief of staff, General Schwartz served as the senior uniformed Air Force officer responsible for the organization, training and equipping of nearly 700,000 active-duty Air Force, Air Force Reserve, Air National Guard and civilian forces serving in the United States and overseas. As a member of the Joint Chiefs of Staff, General Schwartz functioned as a military adviser to the Secretary of Defense, National Security Council and the President.

During his tenure as Air Force Chief of Staff, General Schwartz reaffirmed the importance of Unmanned Aerial Vehicles (UAV), which he believed could be the future of the Air Force. At that time dozens of UAVs were being used in the war on terror, especially in Afghanistan. General Schwartz also estimated that in the future, 85 percent of Unmanned Aerial Vehicles would have a huge role within the Air Force and its operations. In 2011 almost 350 UAV pilots were trained and prepared by the Air Force.

=== Air-Sea Battle Doctrine ===
Together with Chief of Naval Operations Admiral Gary Roughead, General Schwartz developed a new battle doctrine in 2010, The Air-Sea Battle Doctrine. The Air-Sea Battle Doctrine was an Air Force and Navy integrated battle doctrine which formed a key component military strategy. The Air-Sea Battle Doctrine was developed to deal with the unique challenges of the Western-Pacific arena. It created an institutional partnership and cooperation between the United States Air Force and the United States Navy. Both General Schwartz and Admiral Roughead saw the need and importance of joint Air Force and Navy cooperation within the Indo-Pacific region that ultimately lead to the initiation of Air-Sea Battle Doctrine, especially in wartime situations within the Indo-Pacific region.

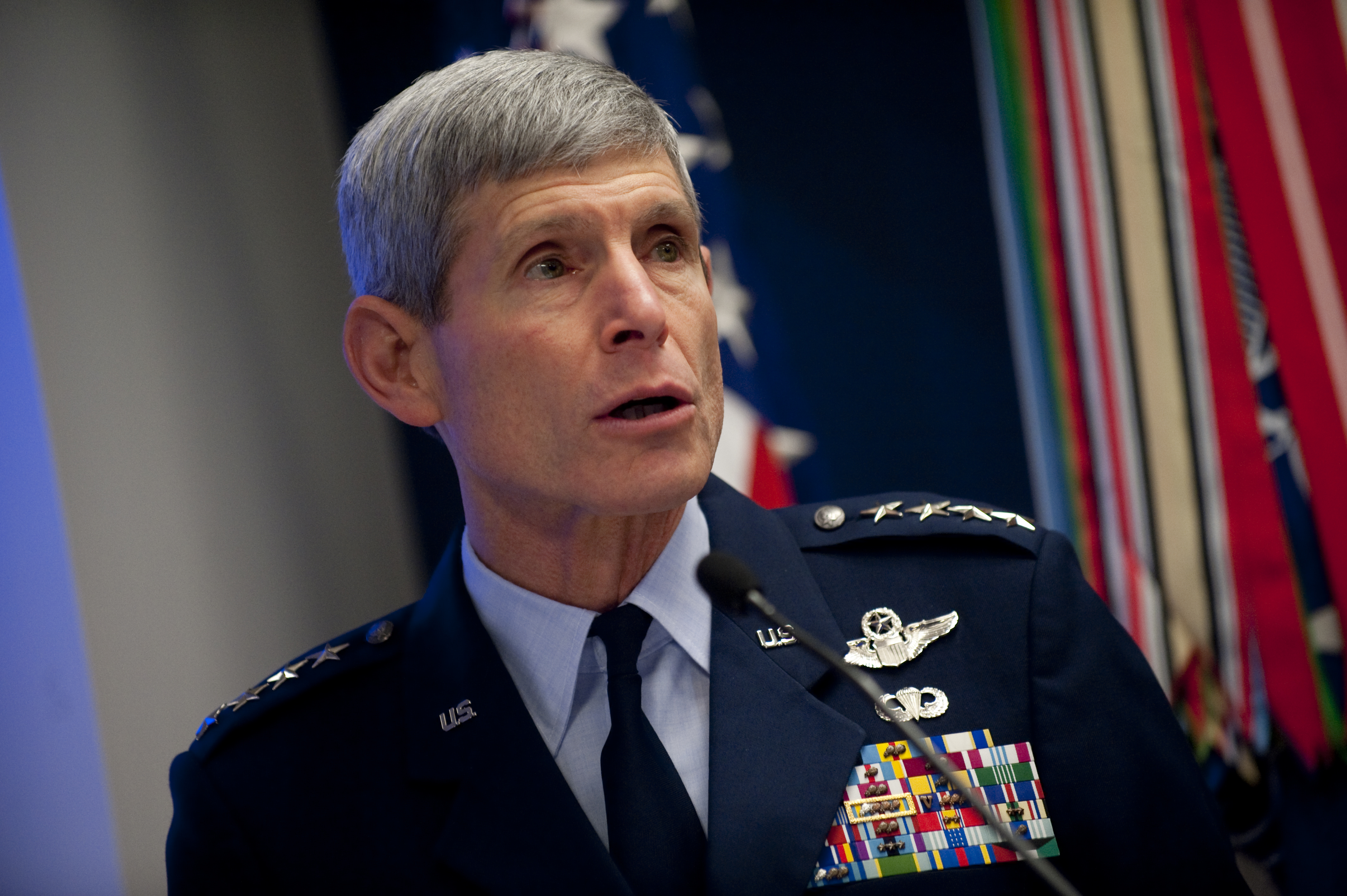
Air Force Chief of Staff General Norton Schwartz speaks at a ceremony in The Pentagon, 25 March 2011

One of the primary goals of Air-Sea Battle Doctrine was interoperability of air and naval forces that could execute networked and integrated in-depth attacks in order to disrupt, destroy and ultimately cripple or defeat the enemy's anti-access/area denial capabilities to sustain and protect the operations area within the Indo-Pacific Region. General Schwartz also emphasized the importance of the air-sea operating space for non-combat operations such as disaster relief. General Schwartz argued that to ensure the success of this doctrine, improved training, tactics and communications technologies between the Air Force, Navy and Marines, would be needed to allow them to work together better, during both wartime and non-combatant operations.

The concept to create a joint Air Force and Navy battle strategy began in the 1990s, when both the Air Force and Navy had institutionalized a joint air operations which eventually led the two services to began exchanging air crews, tacticians and intelligence officers in a joint service partnership following the Gulf War. It created a new cooperative environment that balanced the differences in naval (carrier-based) and Air Force (land-based) air operations, strengthened command and staff relationships, integrated air asset strike operations, and pooled common air resources. In February 2010 the Air-Sea Battle Doctrine became official and in 2015 The Air-Sea Battle doctrine was renamed to Joint Concept for Access and Maneuver in the Global Commons (JAM-GC).

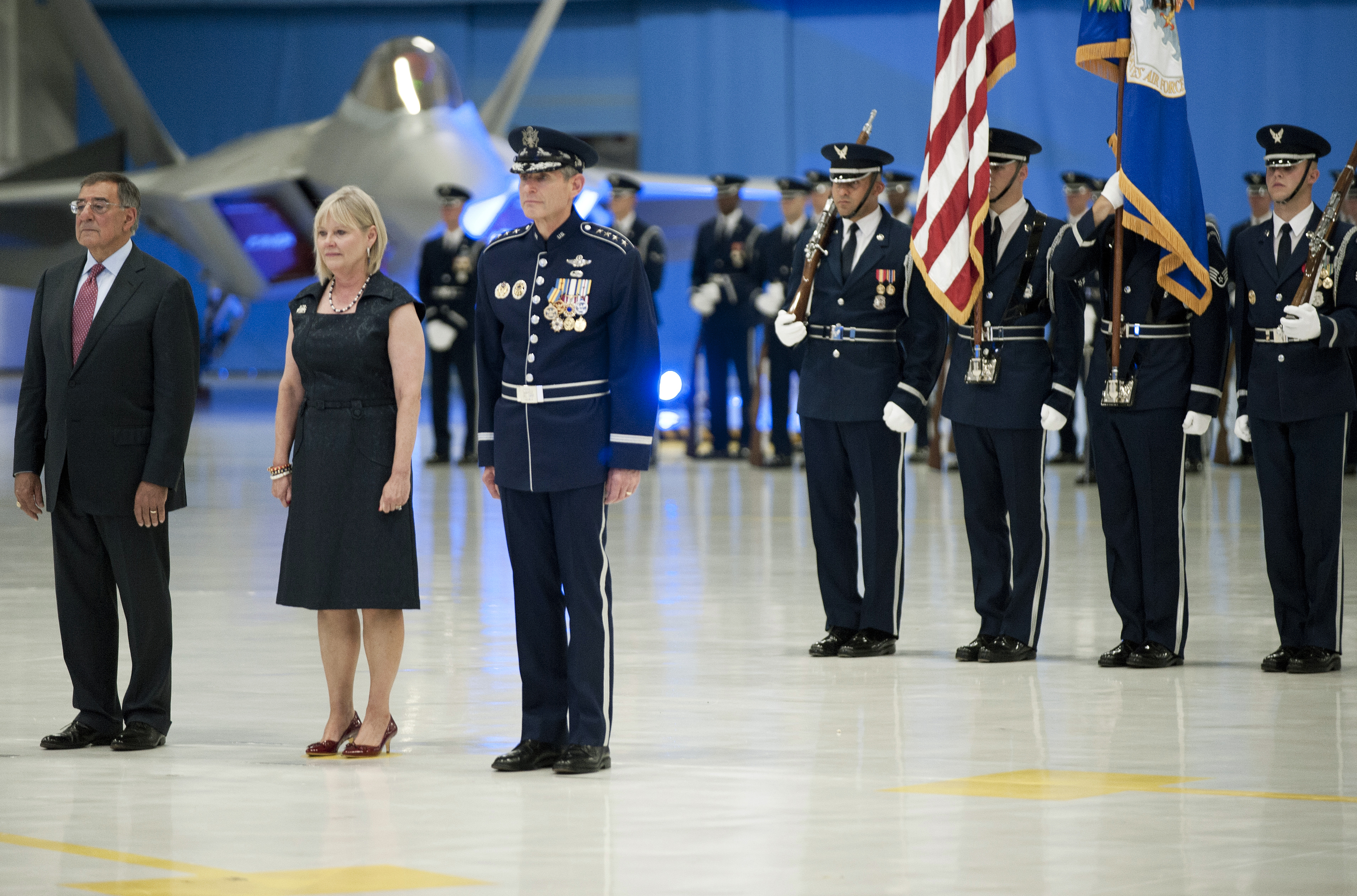
Defense Secretary Leon E. Panetta, Air Force Chief of Staff Gen. Norton A. Schwartz, and his wife, Suzie, listen to the citation for Mrs. Schwartz's Distinguished Public Service Medal at Schwartz's retirement ceremony on Joint Base Andrews, Md., 10 August 2012

In August 2012, General Schwartz retired after serving four years as Air Force Chief of Staff; he had served a total of 39 years with the Air Force. General Schwartz was succeeded by General Mark A. Welsh who previously served as commander of United States Air Forces in Europe and Africa.

== Civilian career ==
After his retirement from the Air Force, he wrote a memoir entitled Journey: Memoirs of an Air Force Chief of Staff with Susie Schwartz and Ronald Levinson.

In 2013, Schwartz became a member of the board of trustees of the Institute for Defense Analyses. In July 2019, Schwartz was selected to become IDA's president and CEO, effective 2 January 2020.

== Personal life ==
Schwartz and his wife Suzie reside in McLean, Virginia.

In 2004, Schwartz was awarded the Jewish Community Center's Military Leadership Award. In accepting the award, Schwartz said he was "proud to be identified as Jewish as well as an American military leader."

== Education ==
1973 Bachelor of Science degree in political science and international affairs, United States Air Force Academy, Colorado Springs, Colorado
1977 Squadron Officer School, Maxwell AFB, Alabama
1983 Master of Business Administration degree, Central Michigan University, Mount Pleasant, Michigan
1984 Armed Forces Staff College, Norfolk, Virginia
1989 National War College, Fort Lesley J. McNair, Washington, D.C.
1994 Fellow, Seminar XXI, Massachusetts Institute of Technology, Cambridge, Massachusetts

== Assignments ==
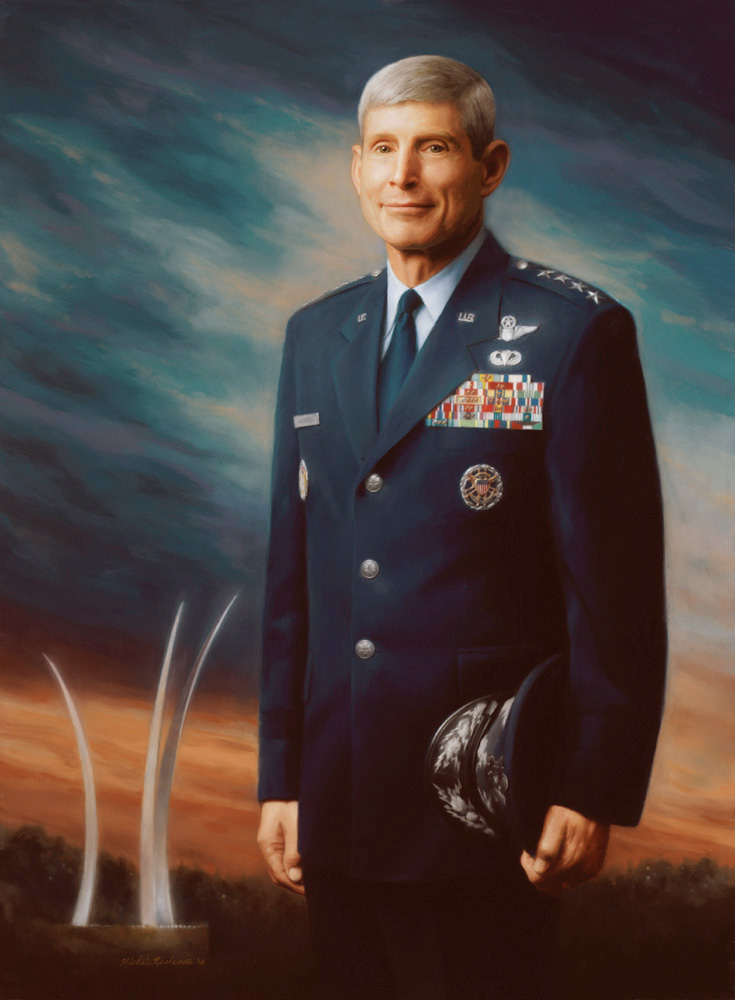
Official Air Force portrait painting of General Norton Schwartz painted by Michele Rushworth

1. August 1973 – September 1974, student, undergraduate pilot training, Laughlin AFB, Texas
2. October 1974 – January 1975, student, C-130 initial qualification training, Little Rock AFB, Arkansas
3. February 1975 – October 1977, C-130E aircraft commander, 776th and 21st Tactical Airlift Squadrons, Clark Air Base, Philippines
4. October 1977 – December 1977, student, Squadron Officer School, Maxwell AFB, Alabama
5. December 1977 – October 1979, C-130E/H flight examiner, 61st Tactical Airlift Squadron, Little Rock AFB, Arkansas
6. October 1979 – November 1980, intern, Air Staff Training Program, Office of the Deputy Chief of Staff for Plans, Operations and Readiness, Headquarters U.S. Air Force, Washington, D.C.
7. November 1980 – July 1983, MC-130E flight examiner, 8th Special Operations Squadron, Hurlburt Field, Florida
8. July 1983 – January 1984, student, Armed Forces Staff College, Norfolk, Virginia
9. January 1984 – April 1986, action officer, Directorate of Plans, Office of the Deputy Chief of Staff for Plans and Operations, Headquarters, U.S. Air Force, Washington, D.C.
10. May 1986 – June 1988, commander, 36th Tactical Airlift Squadron, McChord AFB, Washington
11. August 1988 – June 1989, student, National War College, Fort Lesley J. McNair, Washington, D.C.
12. July 1989 – July 1991, director of plans and policy, Special Operations Command Europe, Patch Barracks, Stuttgart-Vaihingen, Germany
13. August 1991 – May 1993, deputy commander for operations and commander, 1st Special Operations Group, Hurlburt Field, Florida
14. May 1993 – May 1995, deputy director of operations, later, deputy director of forces, office of the deputy chief of staff for plans and operations, Headquarters, U.S. Air Force, Washington, D.C.
15. June 1995 – May 1997, commander, 16th Special Operations Wing, Hurlburt Field, Florida
16. June 1997 – October 1998, commander, Special Operations Command, Pacific, Camp H.M. Smith, Hawaii
17. October 1998 – January 2000, director of strategic planning, deputy chief of staff for plans and Programs, Headquarters U.S. Air Force, Washington, D.C.
18. January 2000 – September 2000, deputy commander in chief, U.S. Special Operations Command, MacDill AFB, Florida
19. September 2000 – October 2002, commander, Alaskan Command, Alaskan North American Aerospace Defense Command Region and 11th Air Force, Elmendorf AFB, Alaska.
20. October 2002 – October 2004, director for operations, the Joint Staff, Pentagon, Washington, D.C.
21. October 2004 – August 2005, Director, the Joint Staff, Pentagon, Washington, D. C.
22. September 2005 – August 2008, commander, U.S. Transportation Command, Scott AFB, Illinois
23. August 2008 – August 2012, chief of staff, Headquarters, U.S. Air Force, Washington, D.C.

== Flight information ==
Rating: command pilot.
Flight hours: more than 4,400.
Aircraft flown: C-130E/H, MC-130E/H/P, HC-130, AC-130H/U, YMC-130, MH-53 and MH-60.

== Awards and decorations ==
Air Force Command Pilot Badge
Parachutist Badge
Joint Chiefs of Staff Badge
Headquarters Air Force Badge

Personal decorations
	Defense Distinguished Service Medal with three bronze oak leaf clusters
	Air Force Distinguished Service Medal with bronze oak leaf cluster
	Defense Superior Service Medal with bronze oak leaf cluster
Width-44 crimson ribbon with a pair of width-2 white stripes on the edges	Legion of Merit with two bronze oak leaf clusters
	Defense Meritorious Service Medal
Width-44 crimson ribbon with two width-8 white stripes at distance 4 from the edges.	Meritorious Service Medal with two bronze oak leaf clusters
	Air Force Commendation Medal with bronze oak leaf cluster
Width-44 myrtle green ribbon with width-3 white stripes at the edges and five width-1 stripes down the center; the central white stripes are width-2 apart	Army Commendation Medal
	Air Force Achievement Medal
Unit awards
	Joint Meritorious Unit Award with silver and three bronze oak leaf clusters
	Air Force Outstanding Unit Award with Valor device and three bronze oak leaf clusters
	Air Force Outstanding Unit Award (Fifth award requires second ribbon due to accoutrement spacing)
	Air Force Organizational Excellence Award
Service awards
	Combat Readiness Medal with two bronze oak leaf clusters
Campaign and service medals
Width=44 scarlet ribbon with a central width-4 golden yellow stripe, flanked by pairs of width-1 scarlet, white, Old Glory blue, and white stripes	National Defense Service Medal with two service stars
Width-44 ribbon with the following stripes, arranged symmetrically from the edges to the center: width-2 black, width-4 chamois, width-2 Old Glory blue, width-2 white, width-2 Old Glory red, width-6 chamouis, width-3 myrtle green up to a central width-2 black stripe	Southwest Asia Service Medal with two service stars
	Global War on Terrorism Service Medal
	Humanitarian Service Medal with three service stars
Service, training, and marksmanship awards
	Air Force Overseas Short Tour Service Ribbon
	Air Force Overseas Long Tour Service Ribbon with bronze oak leaf cluster
	Air Force Longevity Service Award with silver and three bronze oak leaf clusters
	Small Arms Expert Marksmanship Ribbon
	Air Force Training Ribbon
Foreign awards
	Commander's Cross of the Order of Merit of the Republic of Poland
	Kuwait Liberation Medal (Kuwait)

== Effective dates of promotion ==
Promotions
Insignia	Rank	Date
	General	1 October 2005
	Lieutenant General	18 January 2000
	Major General	4 March 1999
	Brigadier General	1 January 1996
	Colonel	1 February 1991
	Lieutenant Colonel	1 March 1985
	Major	1 November 1982
	Captain	6 June 1977
	First Lieutenant	6 June 1975
	Second Lieutenant	6 June 1973

== Gallery ==
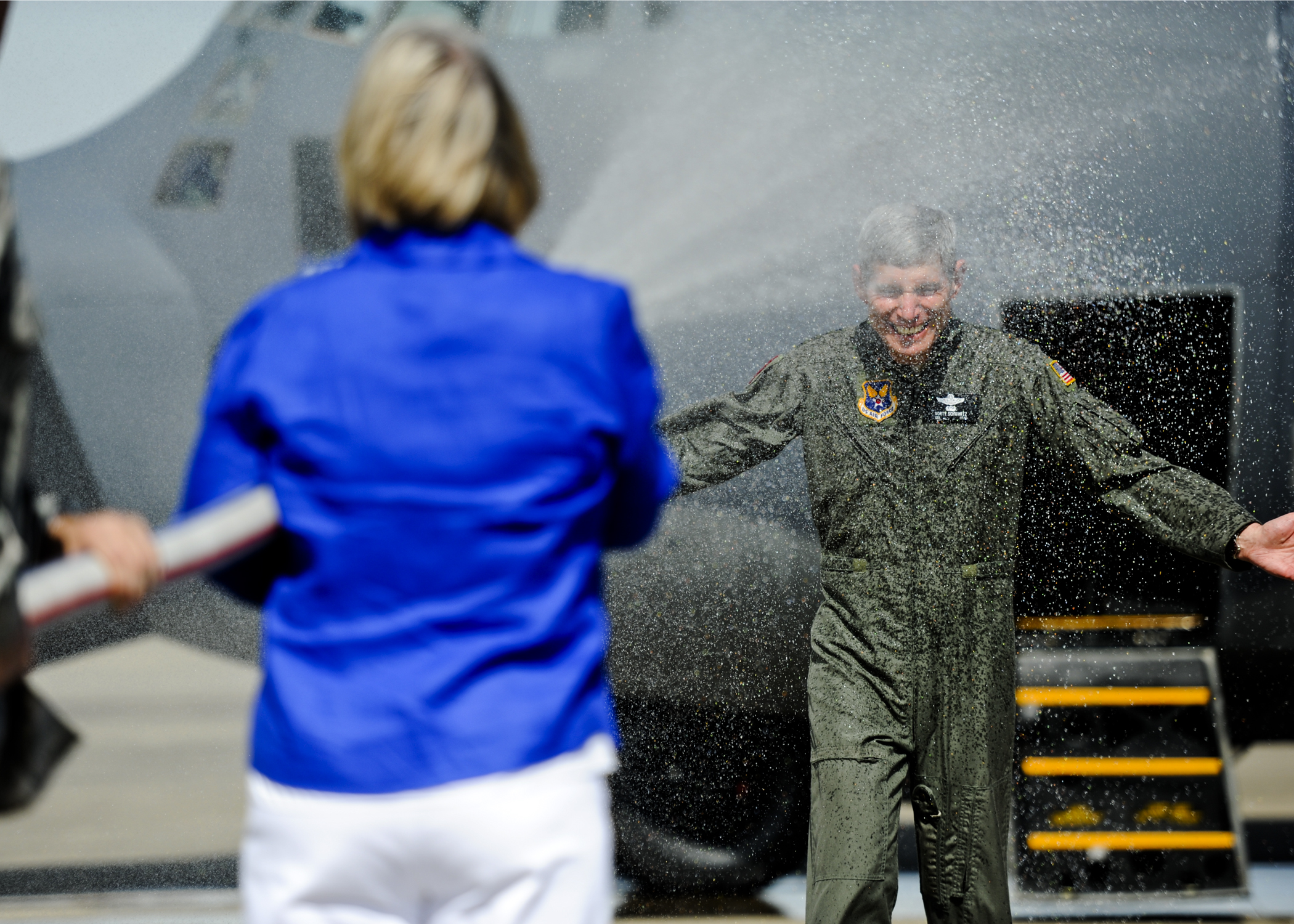
General Norton Schwartz upon landing at Hurlburt Field, Florida following his fini-flight during his last month tenure as Air Force Chief of Staff

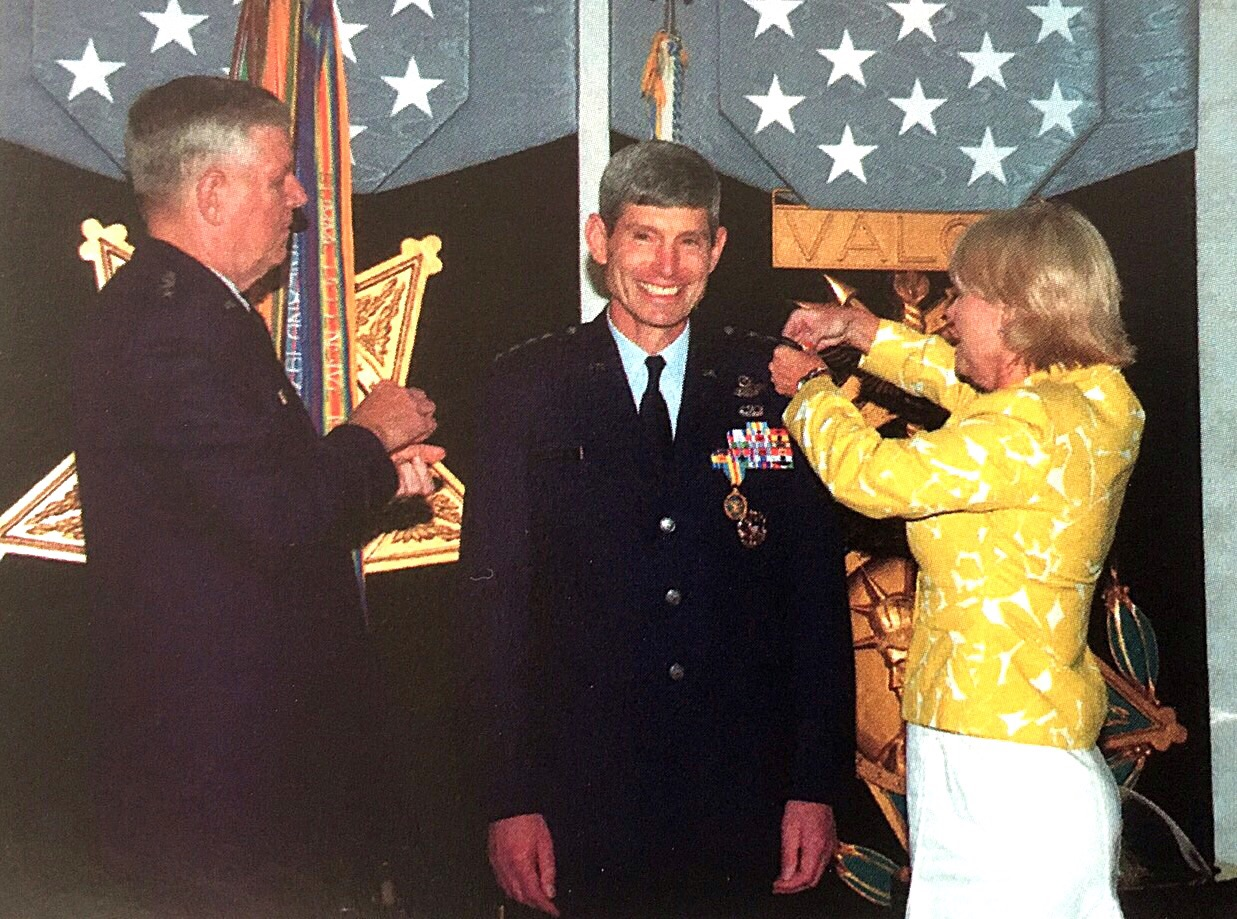
General Norton Schwartz received his Fourth-Star, pinned by Chairman of the Joint Chiefs of Staff General Richard B. Myers and his wife Susie Schwartz at The Pentagon, September 2005

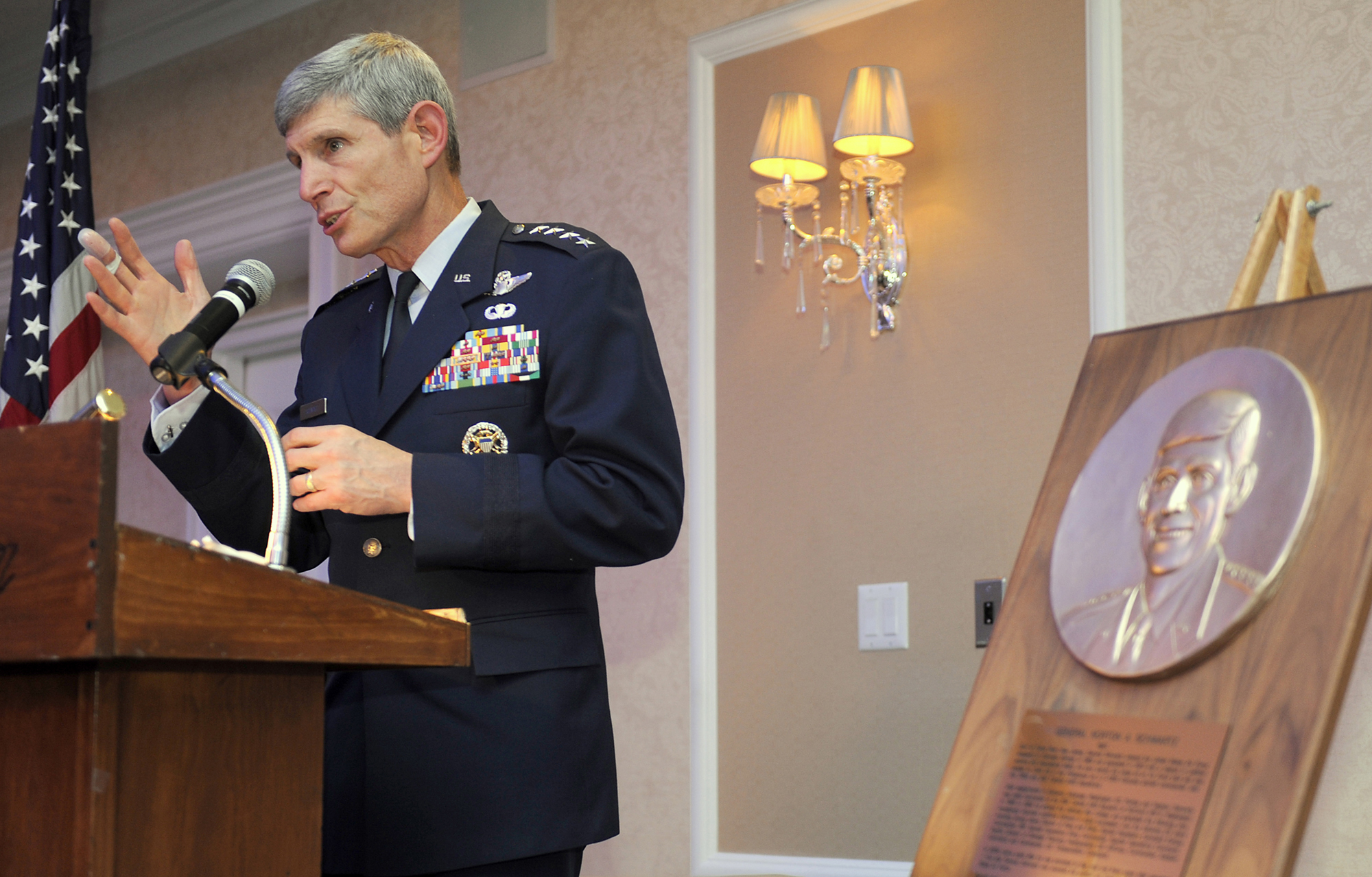
General Schwartz gives his keynote speech during a ceremony at The New Jersey Aviation Hall.

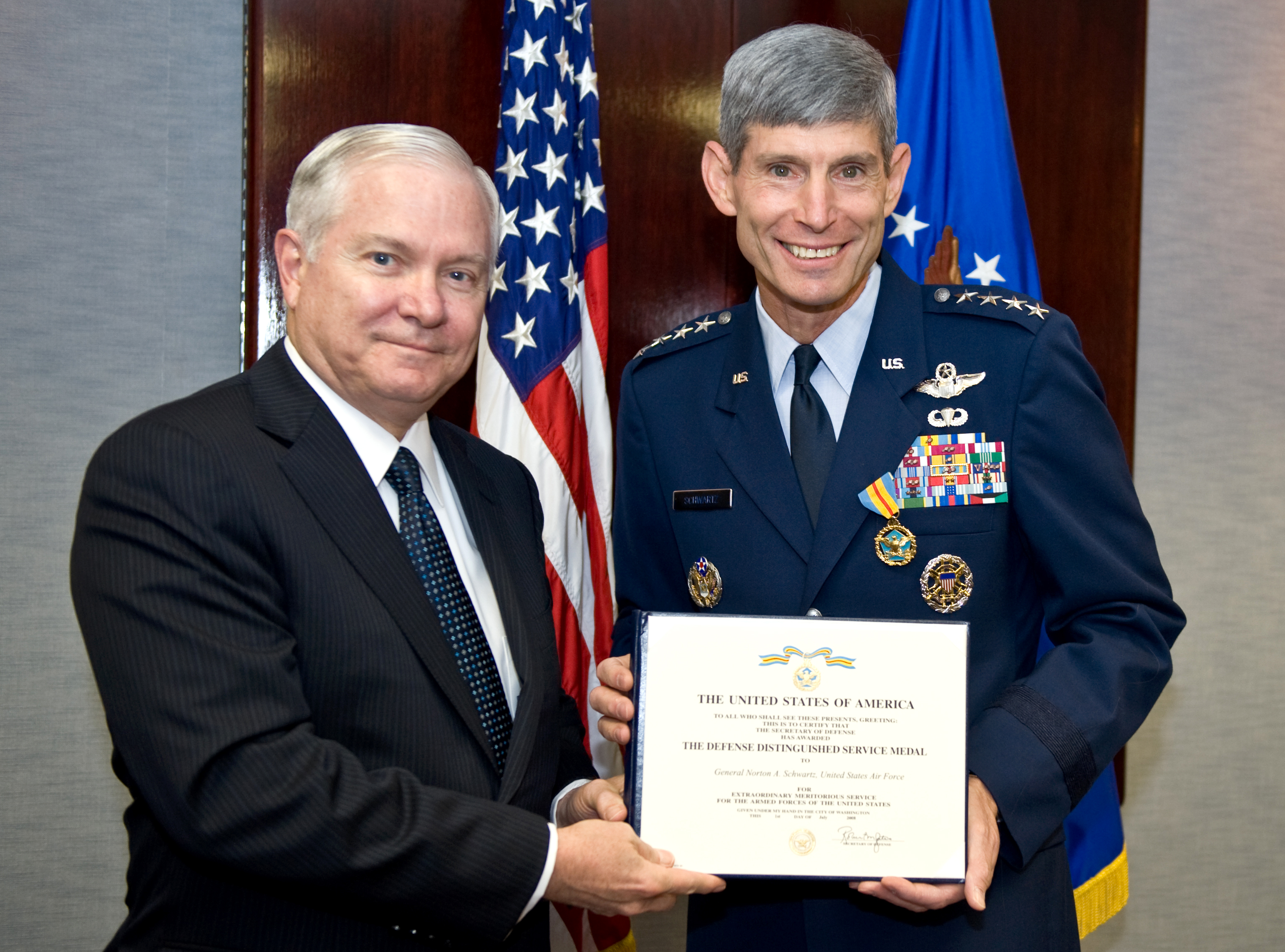
General Schwartz received The Defense Distinguished Service Medal, presents by Secretary of Defense Robert Gates at The Pentagon, 12 August 2008

Military offices
Preceded by Timothy J. Keating	Director of the Joint Staff; 2004–2005	Succeeded by Walter L. Sharp
Preceded by John W. Handy	Commander, United States Transportation Command; 2005–2008	Succeeded by Duncan J. McNabb
Preceded by Michael Moseley	Chief of Staff of the Air Force; 2008–2012	Succeeded by Mark Welsh
