= United States Transportation Command =

Unified combatant command of the United States Armed Forces

- Emblem of United States Transportation Command
- Active: 1987–present
- Country: United States
- Type: Functional Combatant Command
- Role: Provides air, land, and sea transportation for the Department of Defense in times of peace and war. It moves people and property around the world.
- Part of: Department of Defense
- Headquarters: Scott Air Force Base, Illinois, U.S.
- Mottos: Together, We Deliver.
- Colors: Purple
- Website: www.ustranscom.mil

Commanders
- Commander: Gen Randall Reed, USAF
- Deputy Commander: LTG Jered Helwig, USA
- Senior Enlisted Leader: CMSgt Brian P. Kruzelnick, USAF

The United States Transportation Command (USTRANSCOM) is one of the eleven unified commands of the United States Department of Defense. In both times of peace and war, USTRANSCOM's role is to provide the Department of Defense with air, land, and sea transportation. USTRANSCOM was founded in 1987 and is based at Scott Air Force Base in Illinois.

The USTRANSCOM commander is Air Force General Randall Reed.

== Components ==
USTRANSCOM coordinates missions worldwide using both military and commercial transportation resources. It is composed of three service component commands: the Air Force's Air Mobility Command, the Navy's Military Sealift Command and the Army's Transportation Command. The Joint Enabling Capabilities Command, which was part of the former U.S. Joint Forces Command, is now part of the U.S. Transportation Command. Some of the various missions of the different branches of the United States Armed Forces at the USTRANSCOM headquarters include:

=== Air Force ===
The Air Mobility Command (AMC) is also located at Scott AFB. The AMC fleet provides refueling and cargo and personnel transport capability. Aircraft of the command include: C-17 Globemaster III, C-5 Galaxy, C-130 Hercules, KC-135 Stratotanker, and KC-10 Extender. Additional long-range airlift aircraft are available if a U.S. national emergency is declared through the Civil Reserve Air Fleet, a fleet of commercial aircraft committed to support the transportation of U.S. military forces and material in times of crisis.

=== Navy ===
The Military Sealift Command (MSC), USTRANSCOM's sealift component, provides sea transportation worldwide for DoD in peace and wartime. Headquartered in Norfolk, Virginia. MSC uses a mixture of government-owned and commercial ships for three primary functions: surge sealift, principally used to move unit equipment from the United States to theaters of operations all over the world; prepositioned sealift, which comes under USTRANSCOM's command once the ships have been released into the common-user fleet; and sustainment sealift, the lifeline that keeps deployed forces continuously supplied. MSC assets include Fast Sealift and Ready Reserve Force ships. In addition, MSC charters and books space on commercial ships.

=== Army ===
ARTRANS - Army Transportation Command

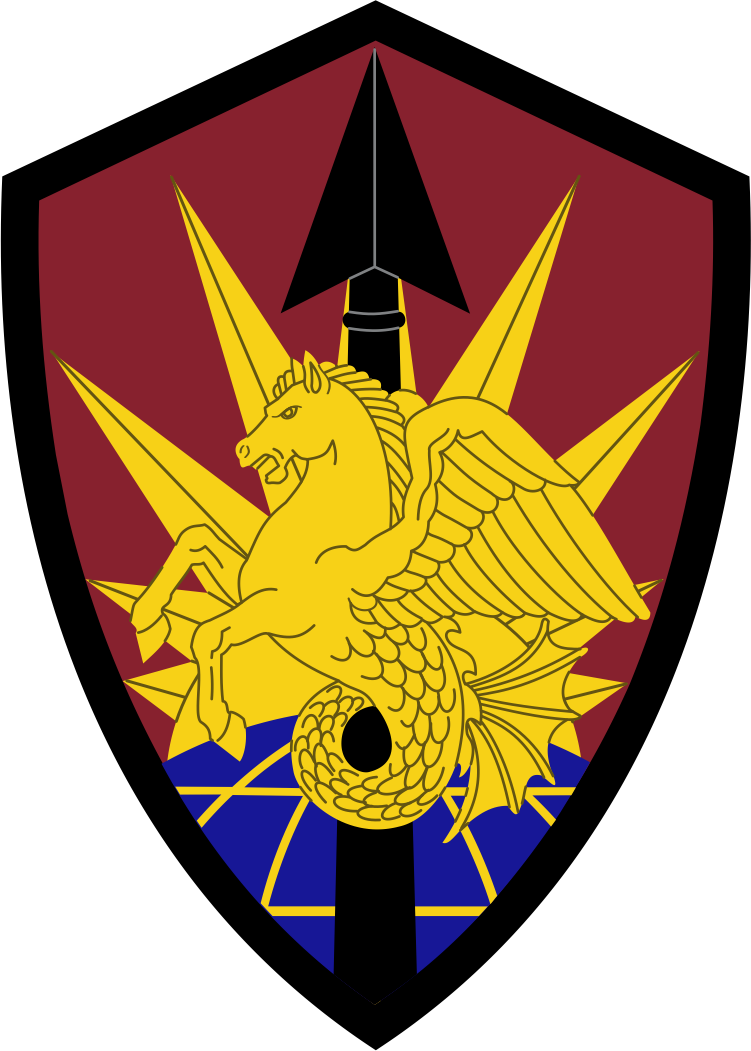
USTRANSCOM - Army Element

The U.S. Army Transportation Command (ARTRANS), located at Scott Air Force Base, Illinois, is the commercial surface lift component and the primary surface distribution manager for USTRANSCOM. ARTRANS provides global surface deployment command and control and distribution operations. ARTRANS has a presence in 24 water ports worldwide. In an average year, ARTRANS manages and directs the movement of 3.7 million measurement tons (4.2 million m³) of ocean cargo, 500,000 personal property moves, 600,000 domestic freight shipments, 72,000 privately owned vehicles and 518,000 passengers. ARTRANS assets include 10,000 containers and 1,350 railroad cars. Within the United States, the ARTRANS works with the Federal Highway Administration to designate the Strategic Highway Network.

The Joint Operational Support Airlift Center (JOSAC) specializes in the airlift of senior defense officials within the continental United States. JOSAC is located at Scott Air Force Base, Illinois.

Joint Enabling Capabilities Command (JECC) supervises quickly deployable planning, communications, and public affairs elements. JECC is located at Naval Station Norfolk, Virginia, and is divided into three subordinate joint commands that provide capabilities across seven unique functional areas. It aims to bring tailored, mission-specific forces to a joint force commander within hours of notification. The JECC subordinate joint commands are:

- Joint Planning Support Element (JPSE) – Provides specialists whose task is to accelerate the formation and effectiveness of newly formed joint force headquarters. JPSE is co-located with the JECC headquarters at Naval Station Norfolk, Virginia.
- Joint Communications Support Element (JCSE) – Provides rapidly deployable, en-route, early entry and scalable command, control, communications, computer, intelligence, surveillance and reconnaissance (C4ISR) capabilities across the full spectrum of operations in order to facilitate rapid establishment of joint force headquarters and bridge joint C4ISR requirements. JCSE is located at MacDill Air Force Base, Florida.
- Joint Public Affairs Support Element (JPASE). JPASE is located in Suffolk, Virginia.

== History ==
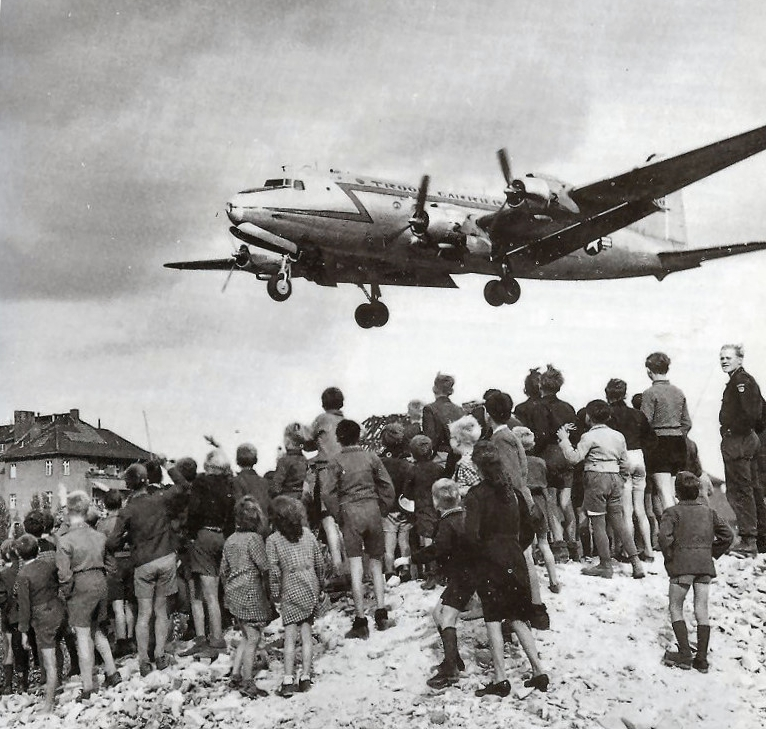
Berliners watch a Douglas C-54 Skymaster land at Tempelhof Airport, during the Berlin Airlift in 1948.

World War II, the Berlin blockade, the Korean War, and the Vietnam War all demonstrated that the United States needed to maintain a capable and ready transportation system for national security. In 1978, however, military exercise "Nifty Nugget" exposed great gaps in the understanding between military and civilian participants: mobilization and deployment plans fell apart, and as a result, the United States and its NATO allies "lost the war". Two major recommendations came out of Nifty Nugget. First, the Transportation Operating Agencies (later called the Transportation Component Commands) needed to have a direct reporting chain to the Joint Chiefs of Staff (JCS). Second, the JCS should establish a single manager for deployment and execution. As a result, the JCS formed the Joint Deployment Agency (JDA) at MacDill Air Force Base in Florida in 1979.

Despite its many successes, the JDA could not handle the job. Although the JDA had responsibility for integrating deployment procedures, it did not have authority to direct the Transportation Operating Agencies or Unified and Specified Commanders in Chief to take corrective actions, keep databases current, or adhere to milestones. According to several independent studies on transportation, the Department of Defense (DOD) needed to consolidate transportation. Consequently, President Ronald Reagan on 18 April 1987 ordered the Secretary of Defense to establish a Unified Transportation Command (UTC), a directive made possible in part by the Goldwater-Nichols Department of Defense Reorganization Act of 1986, which revoked the law prohibiting consolidation of military transportation functions.

The UTC Implementation Plan (IP) outlined the new unified command's responsibilities, functions, and organization. Christened United States Transportation Command (USTRANSCOM), its mission was to "provide global air, sea and land transportation to meet national security needs". It had three transportation component commands—the Air Force's Military Airlift Command (replaced by Air Mobility Command in 1992), the Navy's Military Sealift Command, and the Army's Military Traffic Management Command, (now U.S. Army Transportation Command). The JDA's missions and functions transferred to USTRANSCOM on 18 April 1987, when the agency became the command's Directorate of Deployment. Additionally, the IP located the command at Scott AFB, to take advantage of Military Airlift Command's expertise in command and control. On 22 June 1987, the President nominated Air Force Gen. Duane H. Cassidy as the first Commander, USTRANSCOM, and on 1 July the Senate confirmed the recommendation, thus activating the command at Scott. The commander of USTRANSCOM received operational direction from the National Command Authority (NCA) through the Chairman of the Joint Chiefs of Staff.

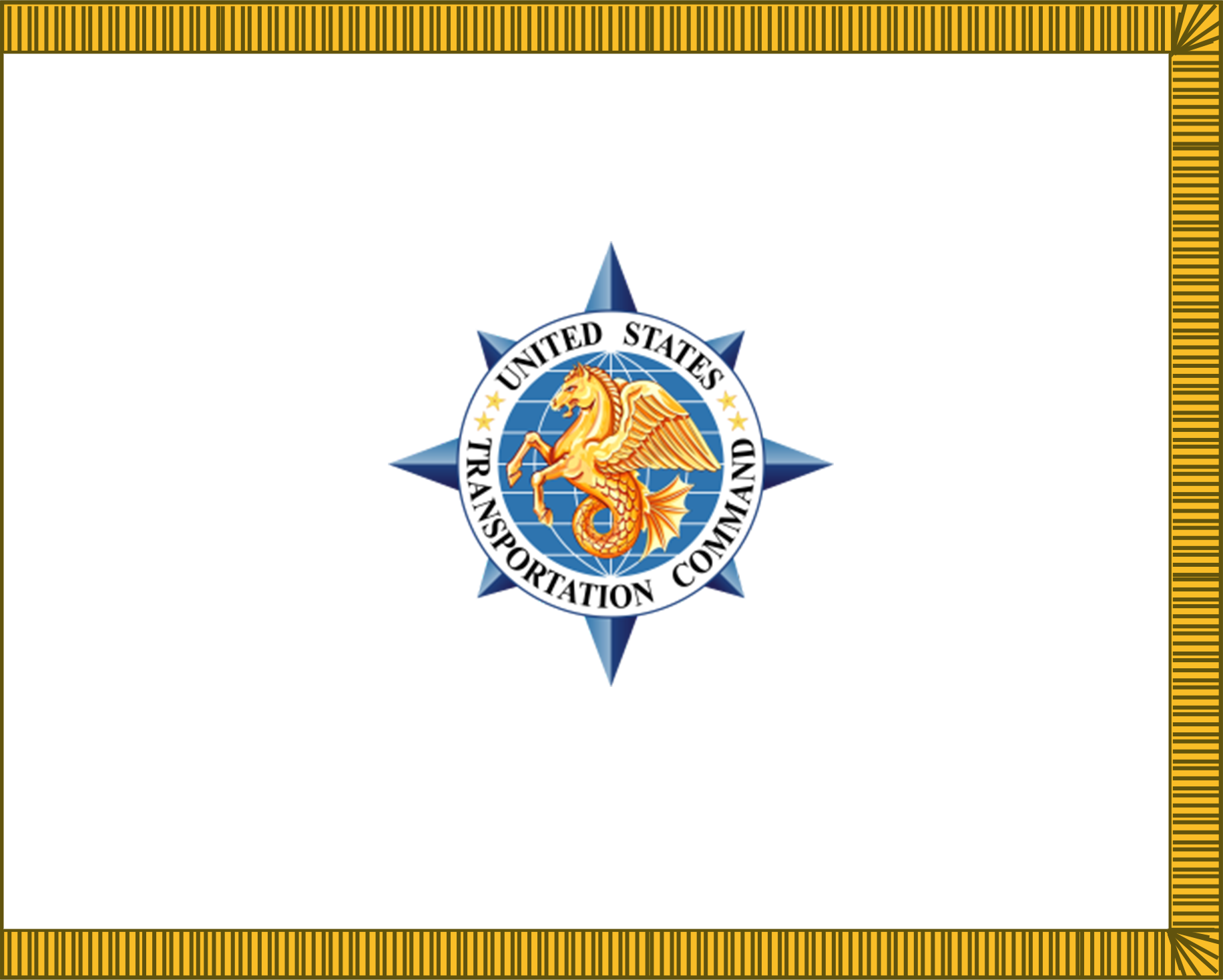
US Transportation Command Flag

USTRANSCOM appeared, at first glance, to be the long sought-after remedy for DOD's fragmented and often criticized transportation system. Its establishment gave the United States, for the first time, a four-star, unified combatant commander to serve as single-point-of-contact for Defense Transportation System (DTS) customers and to act as advocate for the DTS in DOD and before Congress. But it soon became apparent that, in reality, the nation's newest unified command was created half-baked. The IP allowed the Services to retain their single-manager charters for their respective transportation modes. Even more restrictive, the document limited USTRANSCOM's authorities primarily to wartime.

As a result, during peacetime, USTRANSCOM's component commands continued to operate day-to-day much as they did in the past. They controlled their industrial funds and maintained responsibility for service-unique missions, service-oriented procurement and maintenance scheduling, and DOD charters during peacetime single-manager transportation operations. The components continued to have operational control of forces. It took a wartime test by fire – the Invasion of Kuwait (1990) and the subsequent Gulf War (1991) – to bring to maturity a fully operational, peacetime and wartime, USTRANSCOM.

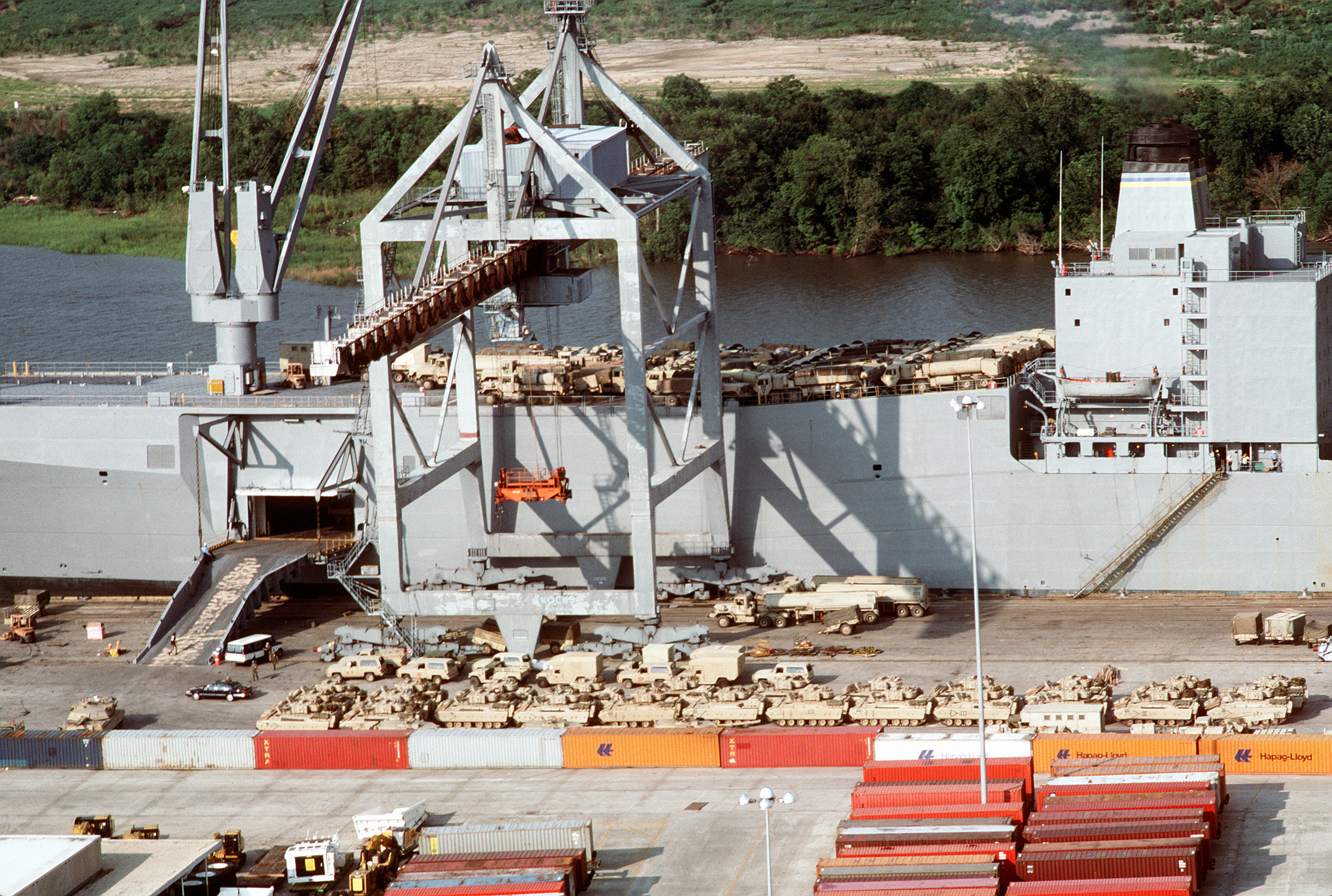
Desert-colored vehicles are loaded aboard a cargo ship in preparation for deployment to Saudi Arabia, during Operation Desert Shield

The strategic deployment for Desert Shield/Desert Storm ranks among the largest in history. The USTRANSCOM, in concert with its components, moved to the U.S. Central Command's area of responsibility: nearly 504,000 passengers, 3.7 million measurement tons (4.2 million m³) of dry cargo, and 6,100,000 short tons (5,500,000 t) of petroleum products; all over the course of approximately seven months. This equated roughly to the deployment and sustainment of two Army corps, two Marine Corps expeditionary forces, and 28 Air Force tactical fighter squadrons.

The DOD learned much from the deployment to the Persian Gulf, and foremost among those lessons was that USTRANSCOM and its component commands needed to operate in peacetime as they would in wartime. Consequently, on 14 February 1992, the Secretary of Defense gave USTRANSCOM a new charter. Stating the command's mission to be "to provide air, land and sea transportation for the Department of Defense, both in time of peace and time of war," the charter greatly expanded the authorities of the USTRANSCOM commander. Under it, the Service Secretaries assigned the components to the USTRANSCOM commander in peace and war. In addition, the military departments assigned to him, under his combatant command, all transportation assets except those that were service-unique or theater-assigned. The charter also made the USTRANSCOM commander DOD's single-manager for transportation, other than service-unique and theater-assigned assets.

In 1995, USTRANSCOM supported 76 humanitarian missions and 94 Joint Chiefs of Staff exercises, visiting approximately 80 percent of the 192 countries.

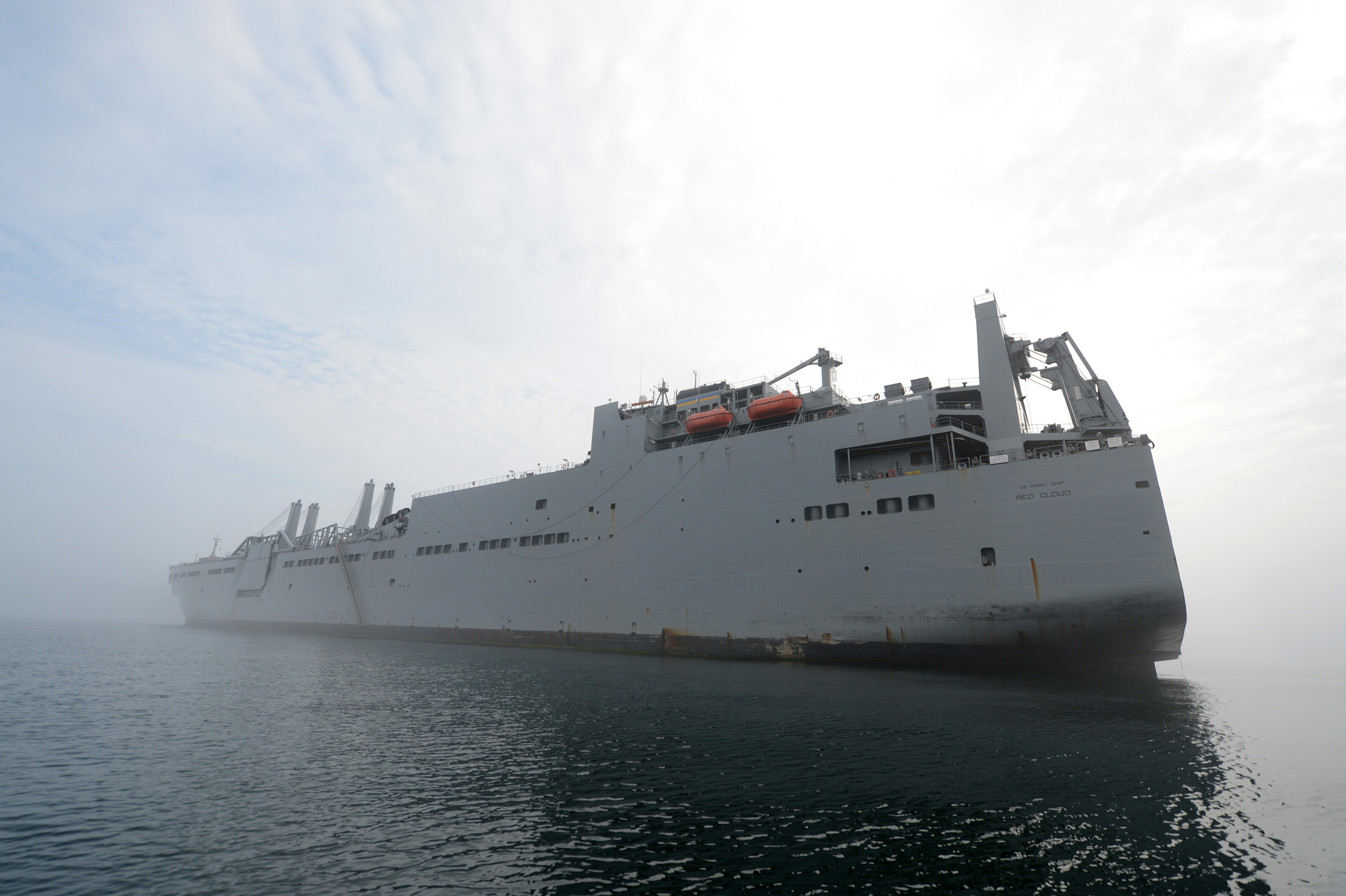
The Military Sealift Command large, medium-speed roll-on/roll-off ship USNS Red Cloud (T-AKR 313) participates in Combined Joint Logistics Over-the-Shore (CJLOTS) 2015 at Anmyeon Beach, Republic of Korea.

Since Desert Shield/Desert Storm, USTRANSCOM has provided transport support in contingencies – such as Desert Thunder (UN resolution enforcement in Iraq) and Operation Allied Force (NATO operations against Serbia), in addition to peacekeeping endeavors – for example, Operation Restore Hope (Somalia), Support Hope (Rwanda), Uphold Democracy (Haiti), Operation Joint Endeavor (Bosnia-Herzegovina), and Joint Guardian (Kosovo). The command has supported numerous humanitarian relief operations, transporting relief supplies to victims of natural disasters in the United States and abroad. Following the 11 September 2001 attacks, it became a vital partner in the United States' Global War on Terrorism – supporting U.S. forces in Operation Enduring Freedom (Afghanistan) and the 2003 invasion of Iraq. From October 2001 to the present, USTRANSCOM, its components, and its national partners have transported over 2.2 million passengers and nearly 6,100,000 short tons (5,500,000 t) of cargo in support of the war on terrorism.

On 16 September 2003, Secretary of Defense Donald H. Rumsfeld designated the Commander, USTRANSCOM as the Distribution Process Owner (DPO) to serve "as the single entity to direct and supervise execution of the Strategic Distribution system" in order to "improve the overall efficiency and interoperability of distribution related activities—deployment, sustainment and redeployment support during peace and war." With the most capable and ready air, land, and sea strategic mobility forces in the world, and with the authorities as the DPO, USTRANSCOM will continue to support the United States and its allies, in peace and war.

== Current activities ==
=== Airlift and Aerial Refueling ===
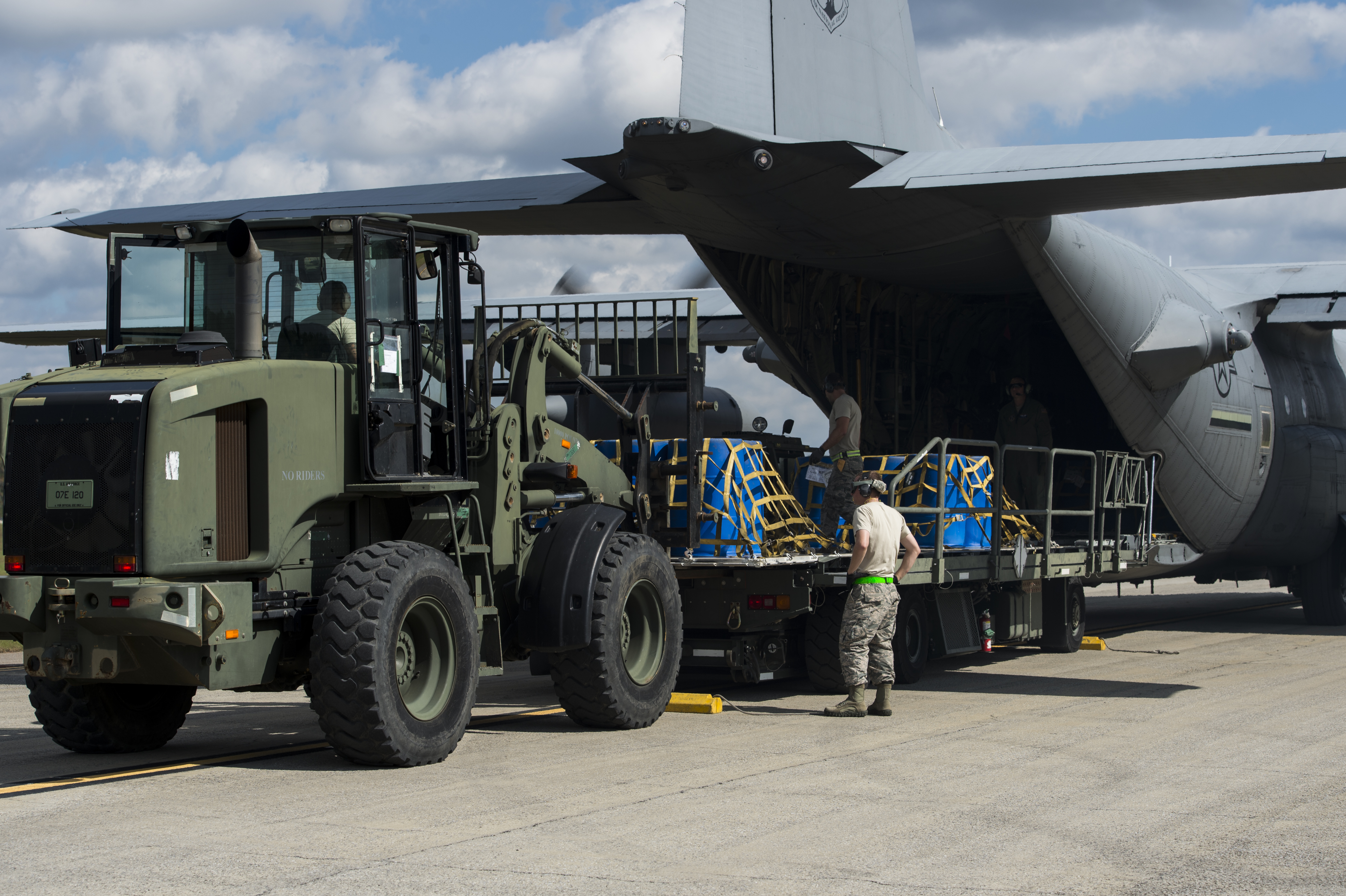
A West Virginia Air National Guard C-130 Hercules prepares to offload cargo at Camp Shelby Joint Forces Training Center, Miss., during Exercise Turbo Distribution, 28 October 2015.

Airlift forces move critical cargo and people to the point of need, while air refueling capabilities enable projection of forces across great distances to any location at any time. The Air Force's primary airlift workhorse, the Boeing C-17 Globemaster III, remains the backbone of the United States' strategic airlift capability. To continue the C-17's airworthiness and meet Federal Aviation Administration (FAA) 2020 mandates, the Air Force has planned a series of modifications for the early 2020s and is pursuing a mitigation plan to restore 16 of their C-17 aircraft from Backup Aircraft Inventory to Primary Mission Aircraft Inventory.

The Lockheed C-5 Galaxy fleet is currently undergoing a Reliability Enhancement and Reengining Program modification through April 2018, which will extend service life past 2040.

Additionally, USTRANSCOM is building partnership capacity with other nations possessing air refueling capabilities. Greater interoperability among nations will strengthen coalition partnerships and provide additional capability to the combatant commands.

=== Surface ===
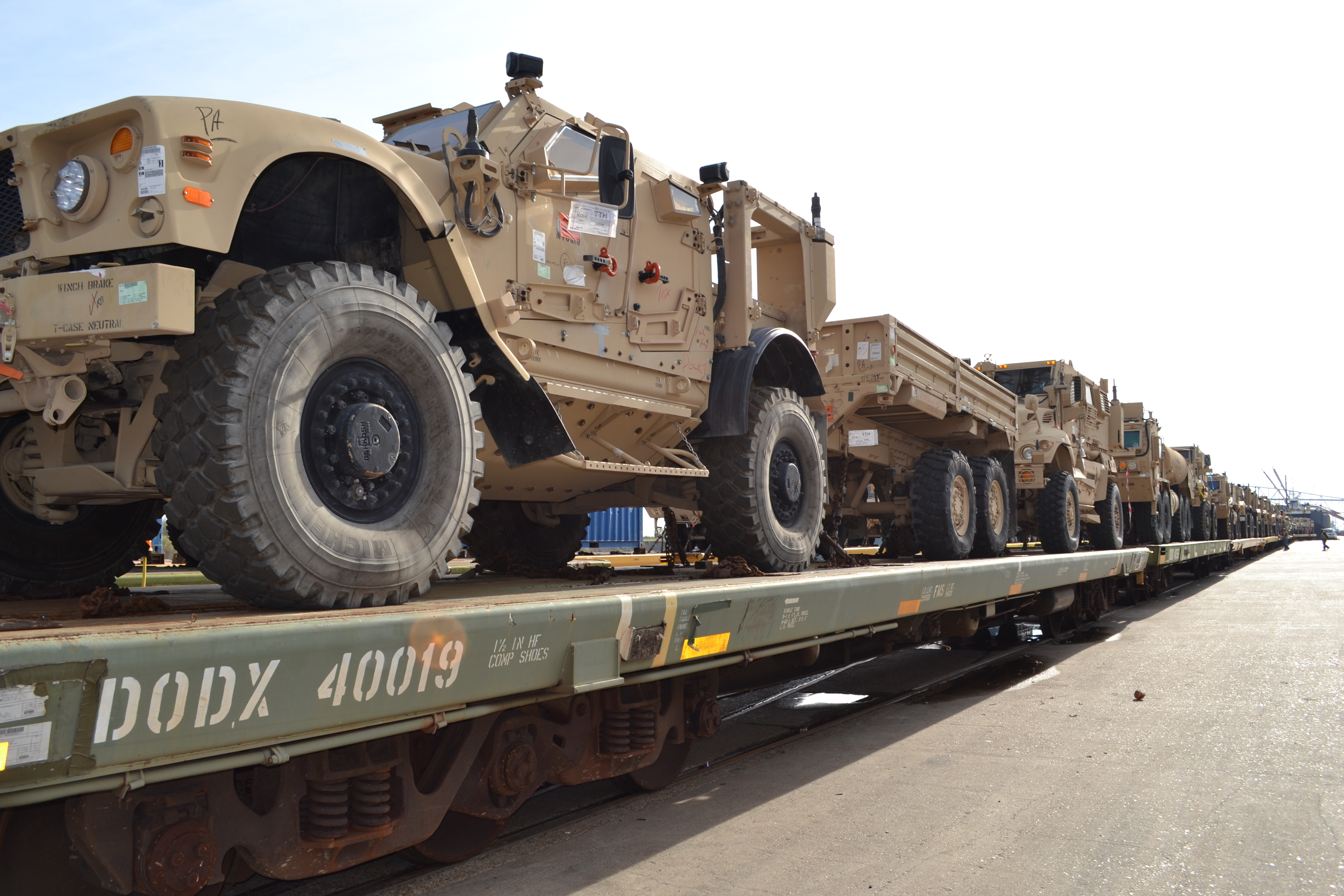
The Army component, U.S. Army Transportation Command, orchestrates terminal operations – simultaneously loading unit equipment headed overseas, while offloading cargo returning from Afghanistan, at the Port of Beaumont and the Port of Port Arthur in Texas, on 8 to 20 December 2013.

Civil transportation infrastructure enables the movement of military forces.

The Defense Personal Property Program (DP3), administered by ARTRANS, enables the movement and storage of service member, DoD employee, and U.S. Coast Guard (USCG) employee personal property and privately owned vehicles. DP3, in collaboration with Transportation Service Providers (TSP), manages over 550,000 personal property shipments for DoD and USCG customers at an annual cost of $2 billion.

The Defense Personal Property System (DPS) and its associated Program Management Office provide a centralized, web-based, single-point interface system for worldwide shipment of personal property. The DPS is a self-service system, offering real-time access for government, industry and customer users to input and retrieve data supporting the entire movement process – from pick-up to delivery of household goods.

=== Sealift ===
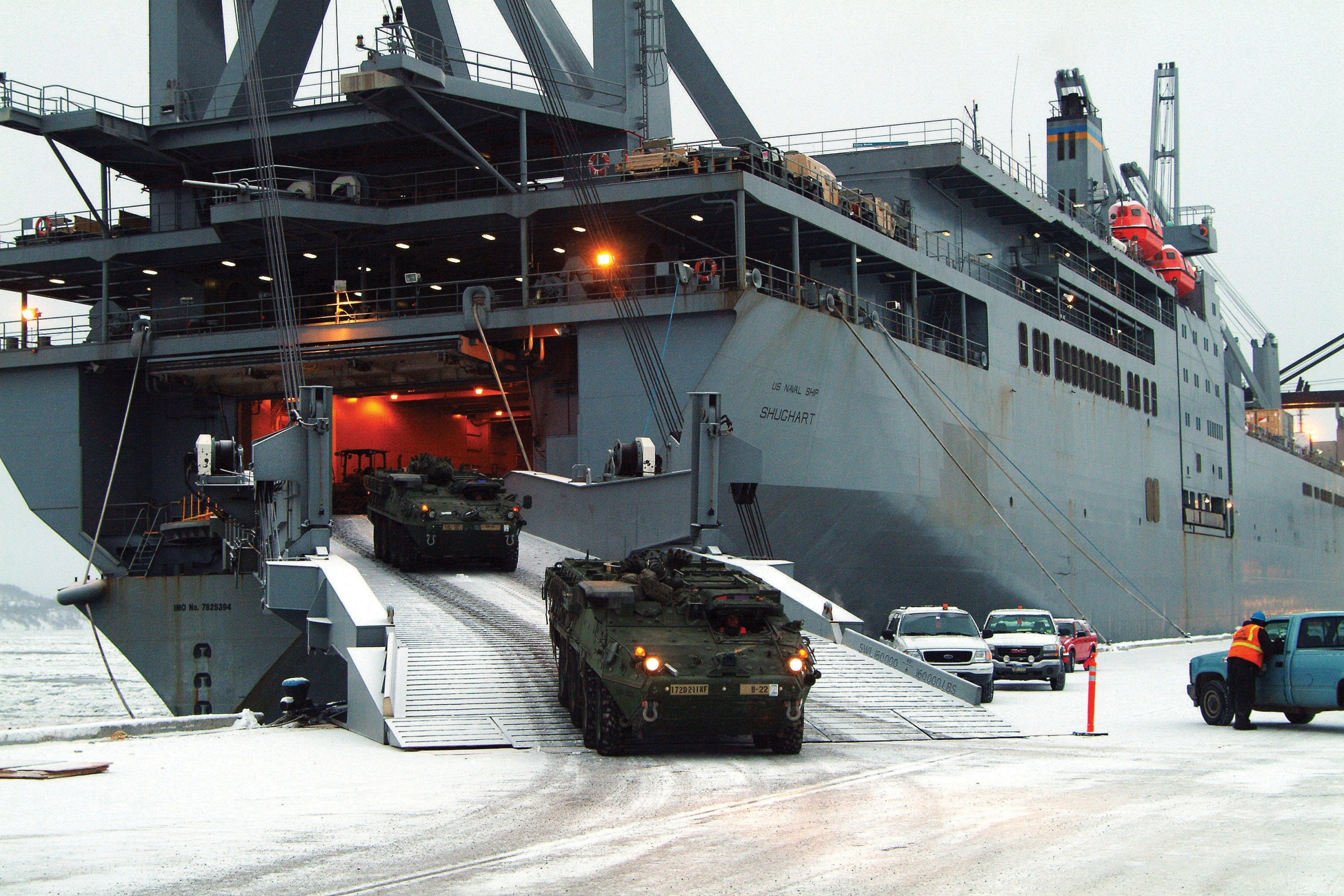
USNS Shughart, a non-combatant RORO vessel, unloading Stryker armored vehicles

Sealift moves roughly 90 percent of all DoD cargo, and maintains the readiness of the entire strategic sealift portfolio, both commercial and organic.

Per the National Sealift Policy, USTRANSCOM relies upon the U.S.-flag commercial shipping industry, to the extent it is available, to provide sealift in peace, crisis and war, and the government-owned organic fleets to provide unique national defense capabilities not resident or available in sufficient numbers in commercial industry. USTRANSCOM's relationships with its U.S.-flag commercial sealift partners are formalized through agreements such as the Voluntary Intermodal Sealift Agreement (VISA), the Maritime Security Program (MSP) and the Voluntary Tanker Agreement (VTA).

USTRANSCOM has expressed concerns on the declining U.S.-flag commercial international trading sector. In the past year, fourteen U.S.-flag international trading vessels within the VISA program were reflagged to a foreign country or scrapped without replacement, mainly due to a reduction in demand. This loss of U.S.-flag vessels represents a net decrease of over 327,000 square feet of roll-on/roll-off force projection capacity, and cost over 600 U.S. merchant mariner jobs. The reduction of U.S.-flag vessels is pushing USTRANSCOM's commercial sealift partners to make adjustments in the services they provide, either by removing liner capacity, or expanding alliances with other carriers to take advantage of larger vessels.

Government-owned organic fleets are also facing challenges. The age of vessels in the United States Maritime Administration's (MARAD) Ready Reserve Force is an ongoing concern, as it will cause the fleet to lose capacity beginning in the mid to late-2020s, with significant losses in the 2030s.

=== Other activities ===
Cyber threats remain a major concern for USTRANSCOM. Nearly 90 percent of its missions are executed over unclassified and commercial networks, mainly due to its extensive use of commercial capabilities.

USTRANSCOM's Joint Cyber Center (JCC) uses a process known as the Cyber Staff Estimate to assess risk, adjust defensive posture, and adopt operational or technical mitigations in performance of key missions. USTRANSCOM integrates cyber security language into a majority of its commercial contracts and co-chairs the National Defense Transportation Association Cybersecurity Committee.

== Combatant Commanders ==
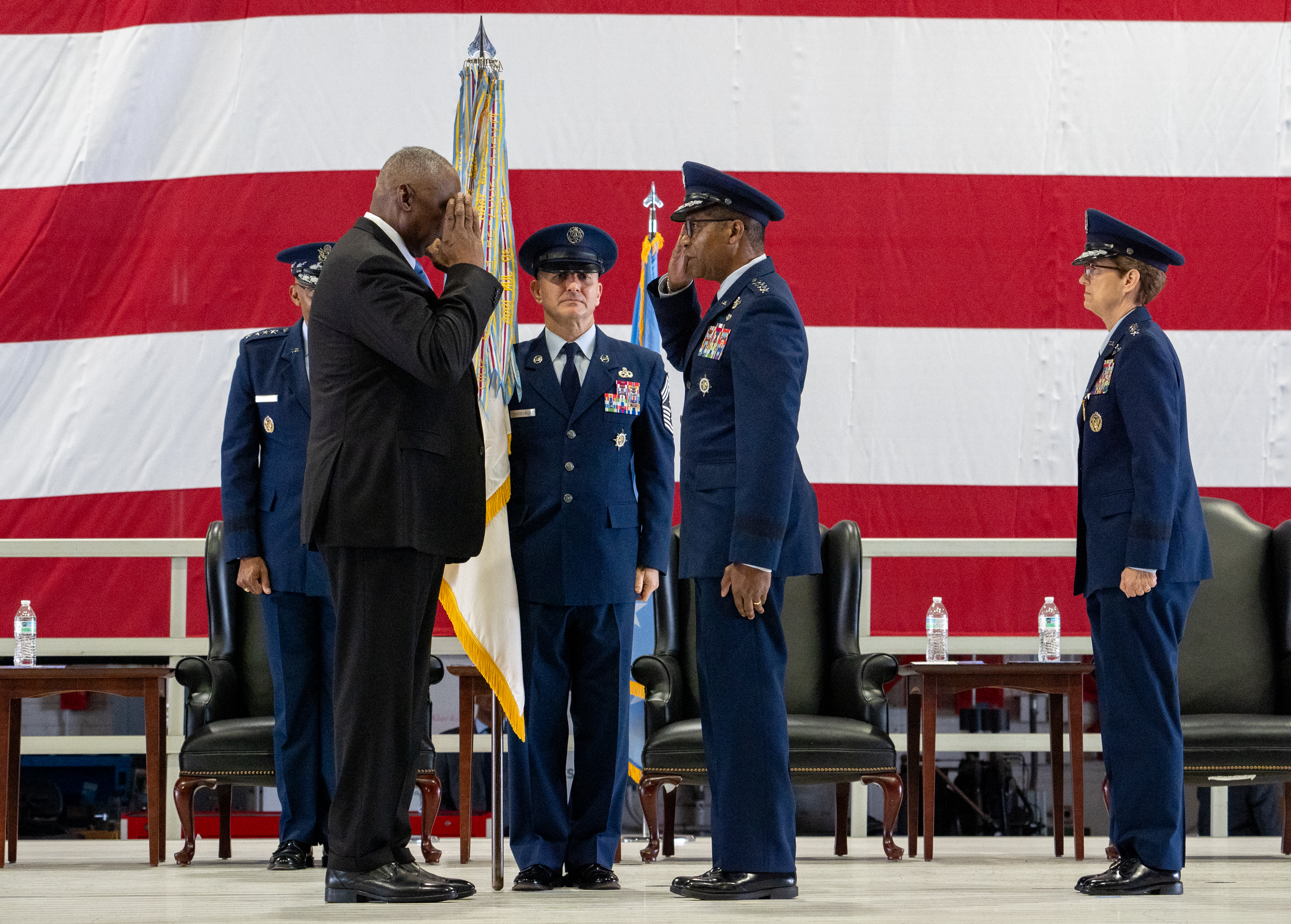
Gen Randall Reed (center right, saluting) assumes command of U.S. Transportation Command on October 4, 2024.

No.	Commander		Term			Service branch
No.	Portrait	Name	Took office	Left office	Term length	Service branch
1	Duane H. Cassidy	General; Duane H. Cassidy (1933–2016)	1 July 1987	21 September 1989	2 years, 82 days	U.S. Air Force
2	Hansford T. Johnson	General; Hansford T. Johnson (born 1936)	22 September 1989	24 August 1992	2 years, 337 days	U.S. Air Force
3	Ronald R. Fogleman	General; Ronald R. Fogleman (born 1942)	25 August 1992	17 October 1994	2 years, 53 days	U.S. Air Force
4	Robert L. Rutherford	General; Robert L. Rutherford (1938–2013)	18 October 1994	14 July 1996	1 year, 270 days	U.S. Air Force
5	Walter Kross	General; Walter Kross (born 1942)	15 July 1996	2 August 1998	2 years, 18 days	U.S. Air Force
6	Charles T. Robertson Jr.	General; Charles T. Robertson Jr. (born 1946)	3 August 1998	5 November 2001	3 years, 94 days	U.S. Air Force
7	John W. Handy	General; John W. Handy (born 1944)	5 November 2001	7 September 2005	3 years, 306 days	U.S. Air Force
8	Norton A. Schwartz	General; Norton A. Schwartz (born 1951)	7 September 2005	11 August 2008	2 years, 339 days	U.S. Air Force
–	Ann E. Rondeau	Vice Admiral; Ann E. Rondeau (born 1951); Acting	12 August 2008	5 September 2008	23 days	U.S. Navy
9	Duncan J. McNabb	General; Duncan J. McNabb (born 1952)	5 September 2008	14 October 2011	3 years, 39 days	U.S. Air Force
10	William M. Fraser III	General; William M. Fraser III (born 1952)	14 October 2011	5 May 2014	2 years, 203 days	U.S. Air Force
11	Paul J. Selva	General; Paul J. Selva (born 1958)	5 May 2014	31 July 2015	1 year, 87 days	U.S. Air Force
–	William Brown	Vice Admiral; William Brown (born 1960); Acting	31 July 2015	26 August 2015	26 days	U.S. Navy
12	Darren W. McDew	General; Darren W. McDew (born 1960)	26 August 2015	28 August 2018	3 years, 2 days	U.S. Air Force
13	Stephen R. Lyons	General; Stephen R. Lyons	24 August 2018	15 October 2021	3 years, 52 days	U.S. Army
14	Jacqueline D. Van Ovost	General; Jacqueline D. Van Ovost (born 1965)	15 October 2021	4 October 2024	2 years, 355 days	U.S. Air Force
15	Randall Reed	General; Randall Reed (born c. 1967)	4 October 2024	Incumbent	1 year, 268 days	U.S. Air Force

== See also ==
- Military logistics
- U.S. Merchant Marine Academy

== Sources ==
This article includes text from the public domain USTRANSCOM Official Homepage.
