= Charles T. Robertson Jr. =

United States Air Force general

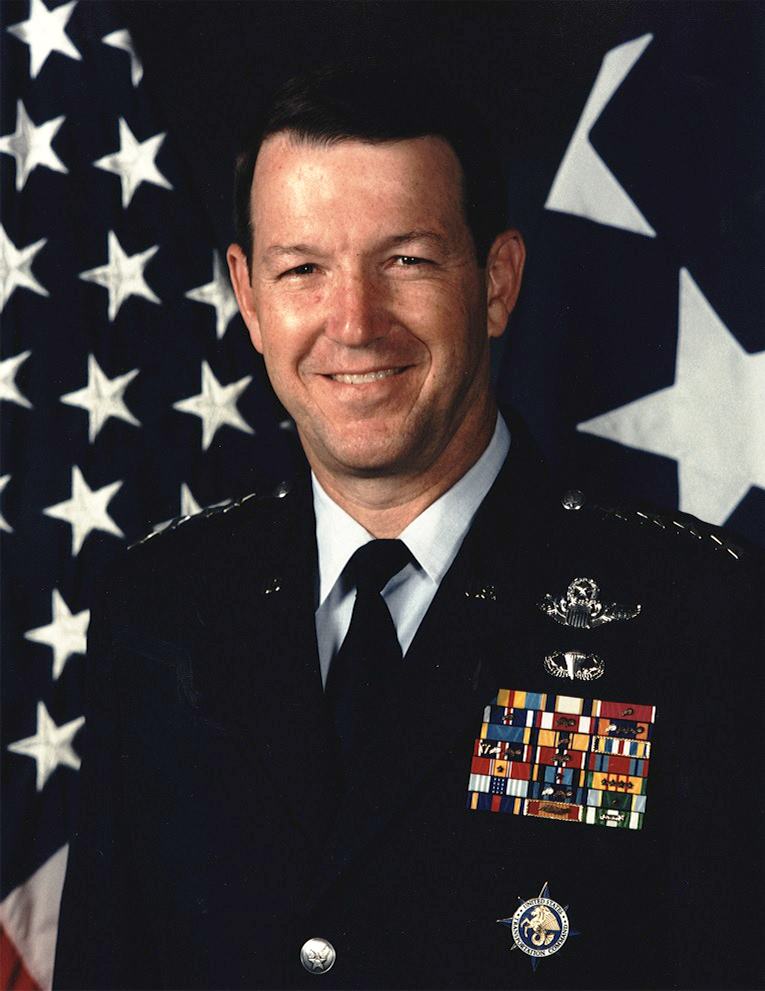
- General Charles T. "Tony" Robertson Jr.
- Born: August 15, 1946 (age 80); Charlotte, North Carolina, U.S.
- Military career
- Allegiance: United States
- Branch: United States Air Force
- Service years: 1968–2001
- Rank: General
- Nickname: Tony
- Commands: United States Transportation Command; Air Mobility Command; Fifteenth Air Force; 384th Bombardment Wing; 2nd Bombardment Wing
- Conflicts: Vietnam War
- Awards: Defense Distinguished Service Medal; Air Force Distinguished Service Medal; Legion of Merit (2); Distinguished Flying Cross (2)

General Charles Thomas "Tony" Robertson Jr. (born August 15, 1946) is a retired United States Air Force general who served as commander in chief, United States Transportation Command, and commander, Air Mobility Command, Scott Air Force Base, Illinois. As commander, he was responsible for the nation's defense transportation requirements.

== Background ==
Raised in South Carolina, Robertson graduated from the United States Air Force Academy in 1968. During his 33-year career he has held a variety of operational and staff positions, including command at the squadron, wing and numbered air force levels. In previous assignments he served as director, personnel plans, Headquarters United States Air Force; vice director, the Joint Staff, Joint Chiefs of Staff; vice commander, Air Mobility Command, and commander, Fifteenth Air Force. A command pilot, he has logged 4,700 hours in airlift, tanker and bomber aircraft, including 150 combat missions as a gunship pilot in Vietnam. Robertson retired on December 1, 2001.

== Education ==
- 1968 Bachelor of Science degree in engineering science, United States Air Force Academy, Colorado Springs, Colorado
- 1975 Squadron Officer School, Maxwell Air Force Base, Alabama
- 1977 Master's degree in industrial management, Central Michigan University
- 1985 National War College, Fort Lesley J. McNair, Washington, D.C.
- 1994 National and International Security Program, John F. Kennedy School of Government, Harvard University, Cambridge, Massachusetts

== Assignments ==
- August 1968 – August 1969, student, undergraduate pilot training, 3550th Student Squadron, Moody Air Force Base, Georgia
- April 1970 – April 1971, AC-119K gunship pilot, 18th Special Operations Squadron, Da Nang Air Base, South Vietnam
- May 1971 – June 1974, B-52H co-pilot, aircraft commander, instructor pilot and flight examiner, 17th Bombardment Wing, Wright-Patterson Air Force Base, Ohio
- August 1974 – October 1975, assistant to the chief of staff, Headquarters Strategic Air Command, Offutt Air Force Base, Nebraska
- October 1975 – August 1977, aide and executive officer to the vice commander in chief, Headquarters Strategic Air Command, Offutt Air Force Base, Nebraska
- August 1977 – March 1980, FB-111A commander, flight commander and assistant operations officer, 528th Bomb Squadron, Plattsburgh Air Force Base, New York
- March 1980 – May 1982, plans and programming officer, Strategic Forces Division, Directorate of Programs and Evaluation, Deputy Chief of Staff for Programs and Resources, Headquarters U.S. Air Force, the Pentagon, Washington, D.C.
- May 1982 – June 1984, FB-111A commander, 529th Bomb Squadron, later, assistant deputy commander for maintenance, 380th Bombardment Wing, Plattsburgh Air Force Base, New York
- June 1984 – July 1985, student, National War College, Fort Lesley J. McNair, Washington, D.C.
- July 1985 – June 1986, executive officer to the Air Force vice chief of staff, Headquarters U.S. Air Force, the Pentagon, Washington, D.C.
- June 1986 – July 1987, assistant for general officer matters, Deputy Chief of Staff, Personnel, Headquarters U.S. Air Force, Washington, D.C.
- July 1987 – January 1989, vice commander, later, commander, 2nd Bombardment Wing, Barksdale Air Force Base, Louisiana
- January 1989 – January 1990, commander, 384th Bombardment Wing, McConnell Air Force Base, Kansas
- January 1990 – August 1991, assistant deputy chief of staff, Plans and Resources, Headquarters Strategic Air Command, Offutt Air Force Base, Nebraska
- August 1991 – June 1993, director, Personnel Plans, Deputy Chief of Staff for Personnel, Headquarters U.S. Air Force, the Pentagon, Washington, D.C.
- June 1993 – June 1995, vice director, the Joint Staff, Joint Chiefs of Staff, the Pentagon, Washington, D.C.
- June 1995 – September 1996, vice commander, Air Mobility Command, Scott Air Force Base, Illinois
- September 1996 – July 1998, commander, Fifteenth Air Force, Travis Air Force Base, California
- August 1998 – December 2001, commander in chief, United States Transportation Command, and commander, Air Mobility Command, Scott Air Force Base, Illinois

== Flight information ==
- Rating: Command pilot, parachutist
- Flight hours: 4,700
- Aircraft flown: AC-119K, B-1B, B-2, B-52, C-5, C-9, C-17, C-20B, C-21, C-37, C-130, C-141, EC-135, FB-111A, KC-10, KC-135, T-1, T-6, T-37, T-38 and T-39

== Awards and decorations ==
Air Force Command Pilot Badge
Basic Parachutist Badge
United States Transportation Command Badge

Defense Distinguished Service Medal
Air Force Distinguished Service Medal
Legion of Merit with one bronze oak leaf cluster
Distinguished Flying Cross with oak leaf cluster
Meritorious Service Medal with two oak leaf clusters
Air Medal with eight oak leaf clusters
Aerial Achievement Medal
Air Force Commendation Medal with oak leaf cluster
Joint Meritorious Unit Award
Air Force Outstanding Unit Award with "V" device, one silver and two bronze oak leaf clusters
Air Force Organizational Excellence Award with two oak leaf clusters
Combat Readiness Medal
National Defense Service Medal with one bronze service star
Armed Forces Expeditionary Medal with service star
Vietnam Service Medal with four service stars
Air Force Overseas Long Tour Service Ribbon
Air Force Longevity Service Award with one silver and two bronze oak leaf clusters
Small Arms Expert Marksmanship Ribbon with service star
Air Force Training Ribbon
Vietnam Gallantry Cross Unit Citation
Vietnam Campaign Medal
