= Order of the Sword (United States) =

US Air Force honour award

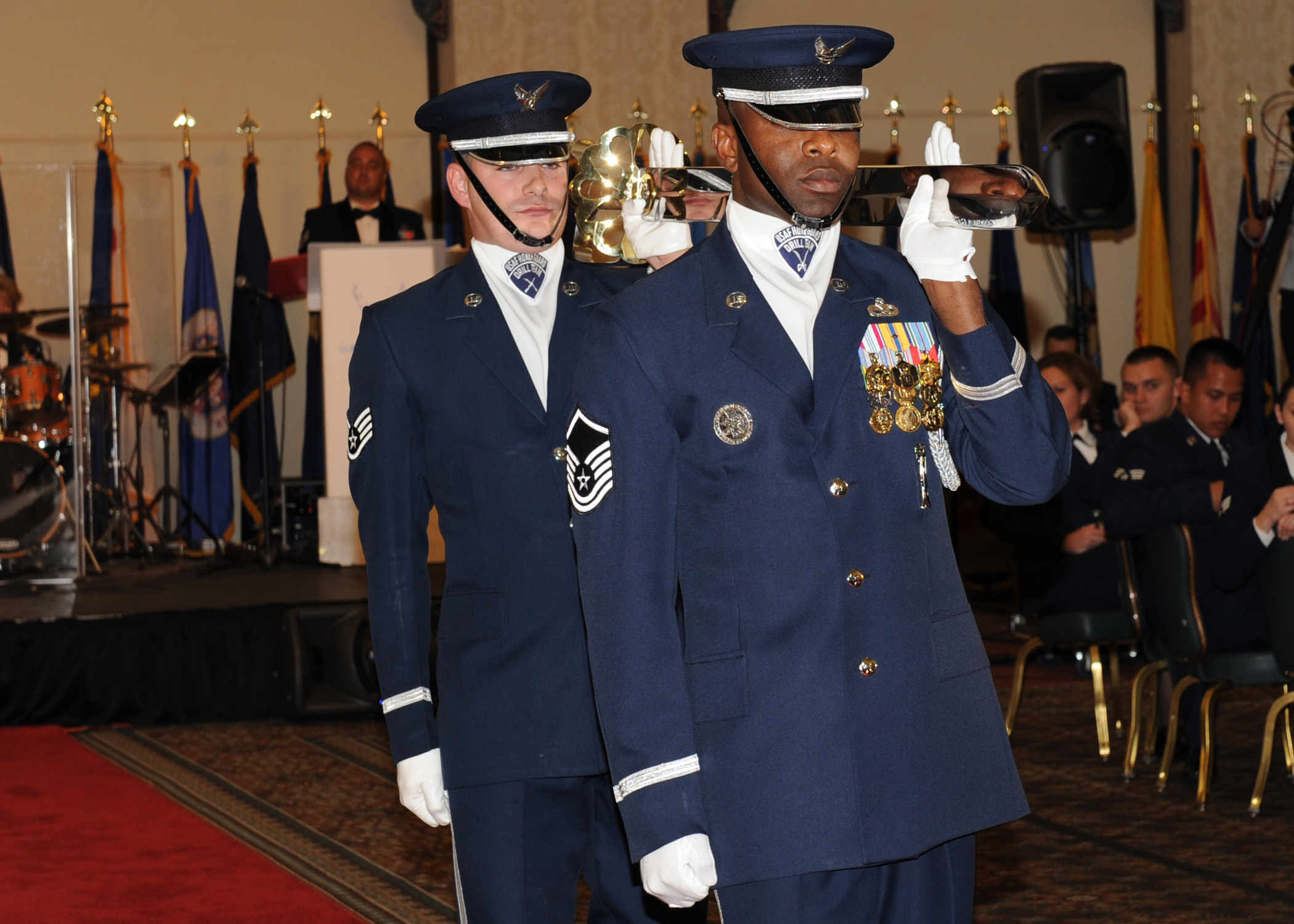
Honor guard members carrying a sword for an Order of the Sword ceremony.

The Order of the Sword is an honor awarded within the United States Air Force. It is a special program where noncommissioned officers of a command recognize individuals they hold in high esteem and wish to honor. Those selected for induction are usually honored during a formal ceremony at a dining-in. The honor can be awarded at the unit level or (more rarely) at the Air Force level.

The U.S. Army and Marine Corps lack such an honor bestowed by the enlisted corps upon the officer corps. The U.S. Navy has the title of "Honorary Chief Petty Officer."

The origin of the tradition is that:

The Order of the Sword recognizes individuals who have made significant contributions to the enlisted corps. Only seven other individuals have been so honored since 1978. The ceremonial presentation was adopted from the Royal Order of the Sword and passed to the United States during the Revolutionary War. However, it lay dormant until it was reinstituted in its current form in 1967. The original order of the sword was patterned after two orders of chivalry founded during the Middle Ages in Europe: the (British) Royal Order of the Sword and the Swedish Military Order of the Sword, still in existence today. In 1522, King Gustavus I of Sweden ordered the noblemen commissioned by him to appoint officers to serve him, and these people became known as the noncommissioned officers.

== Recipients ==
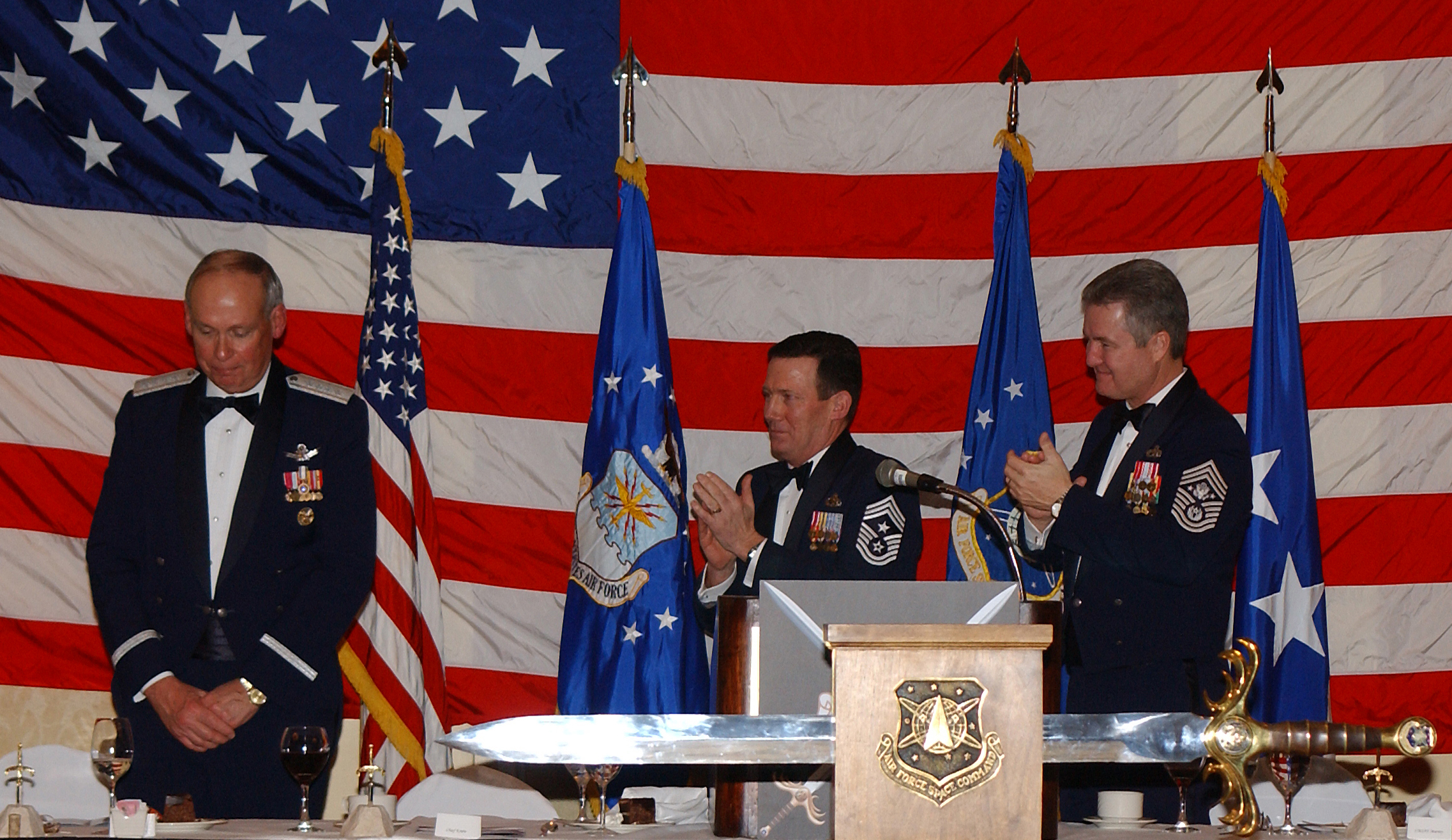
General Lord in 2006

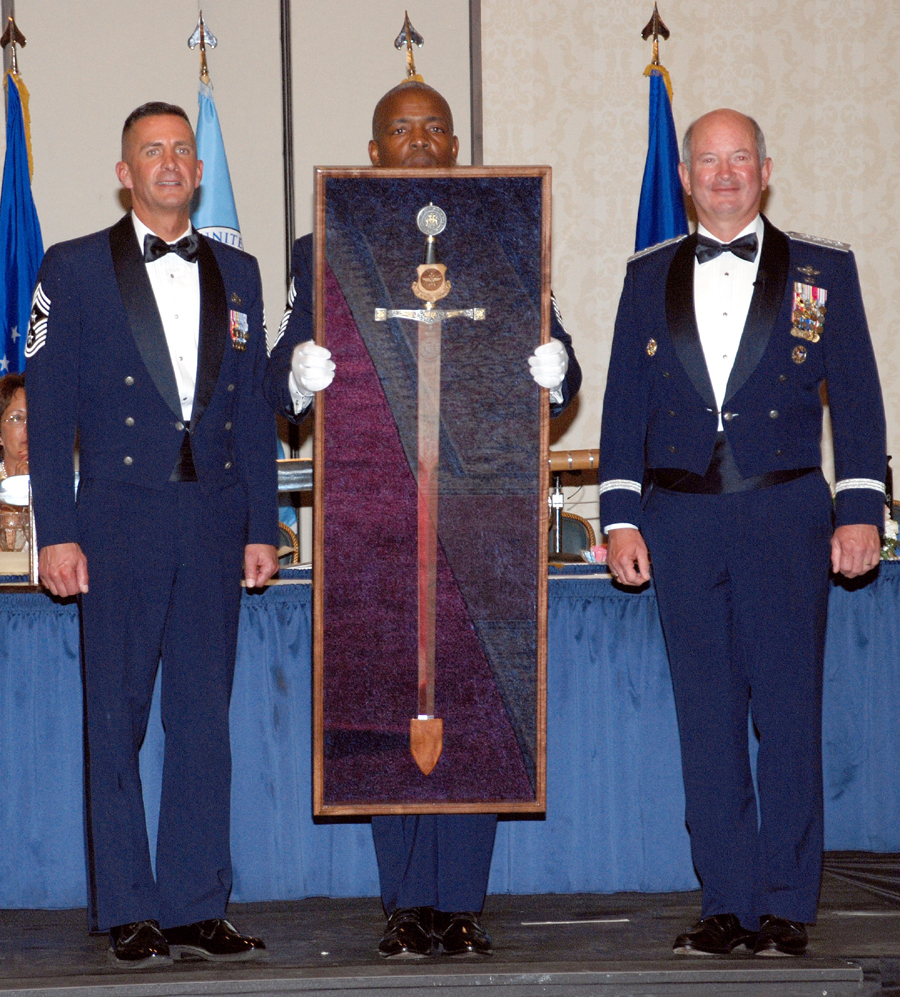
General McNabb in 2007

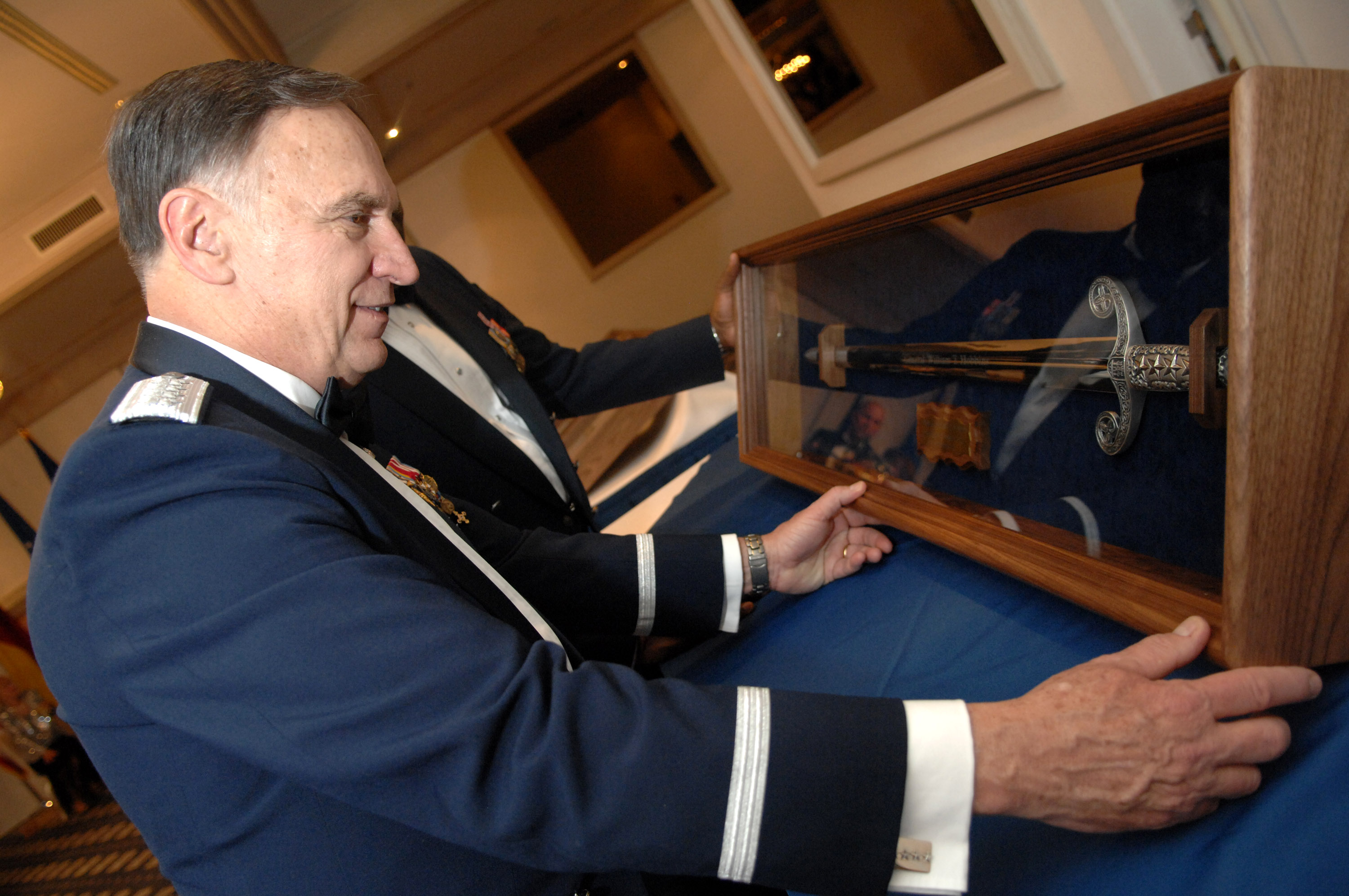
General Hobbins in 2007

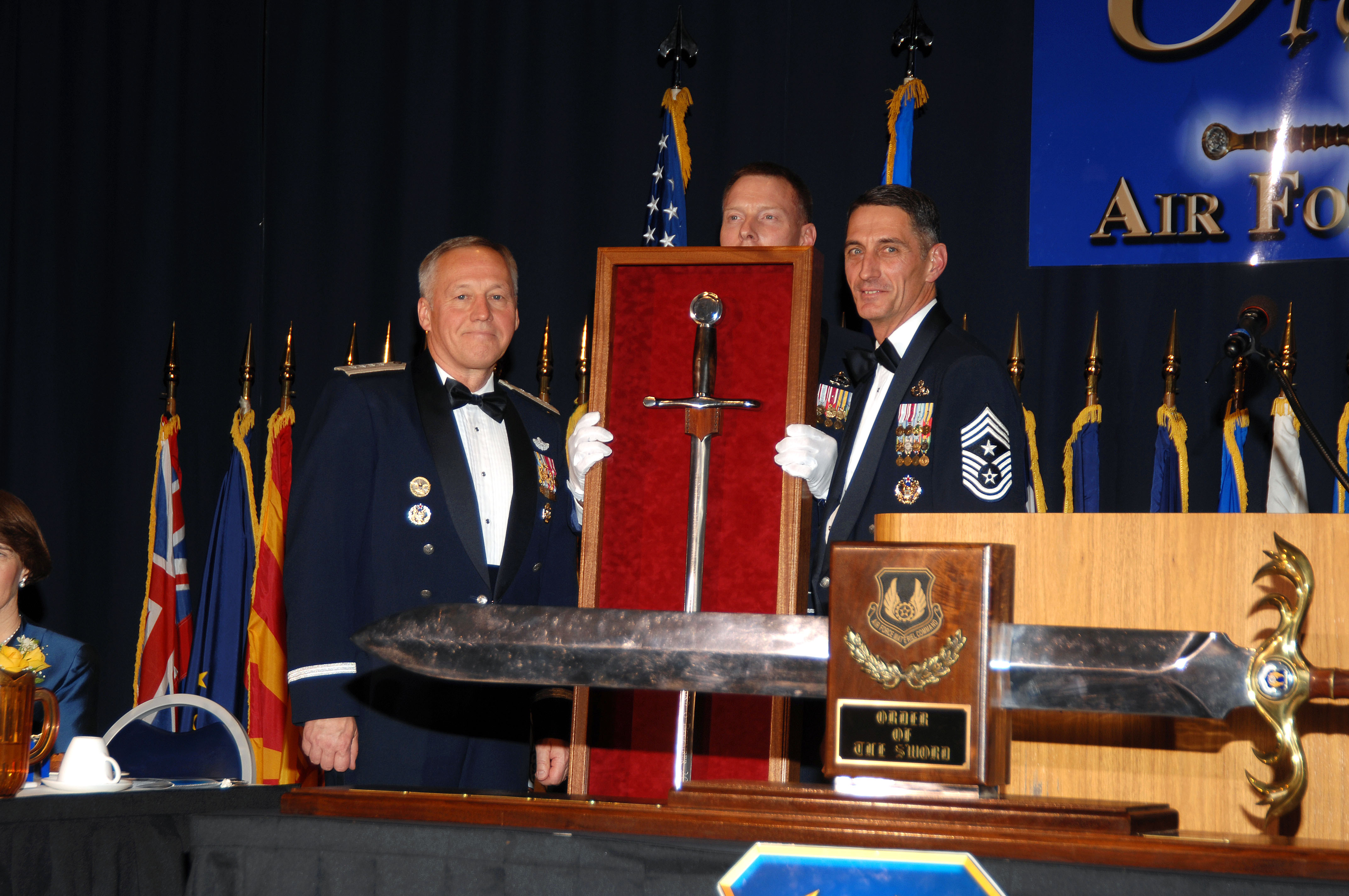
General Carlson in 2007

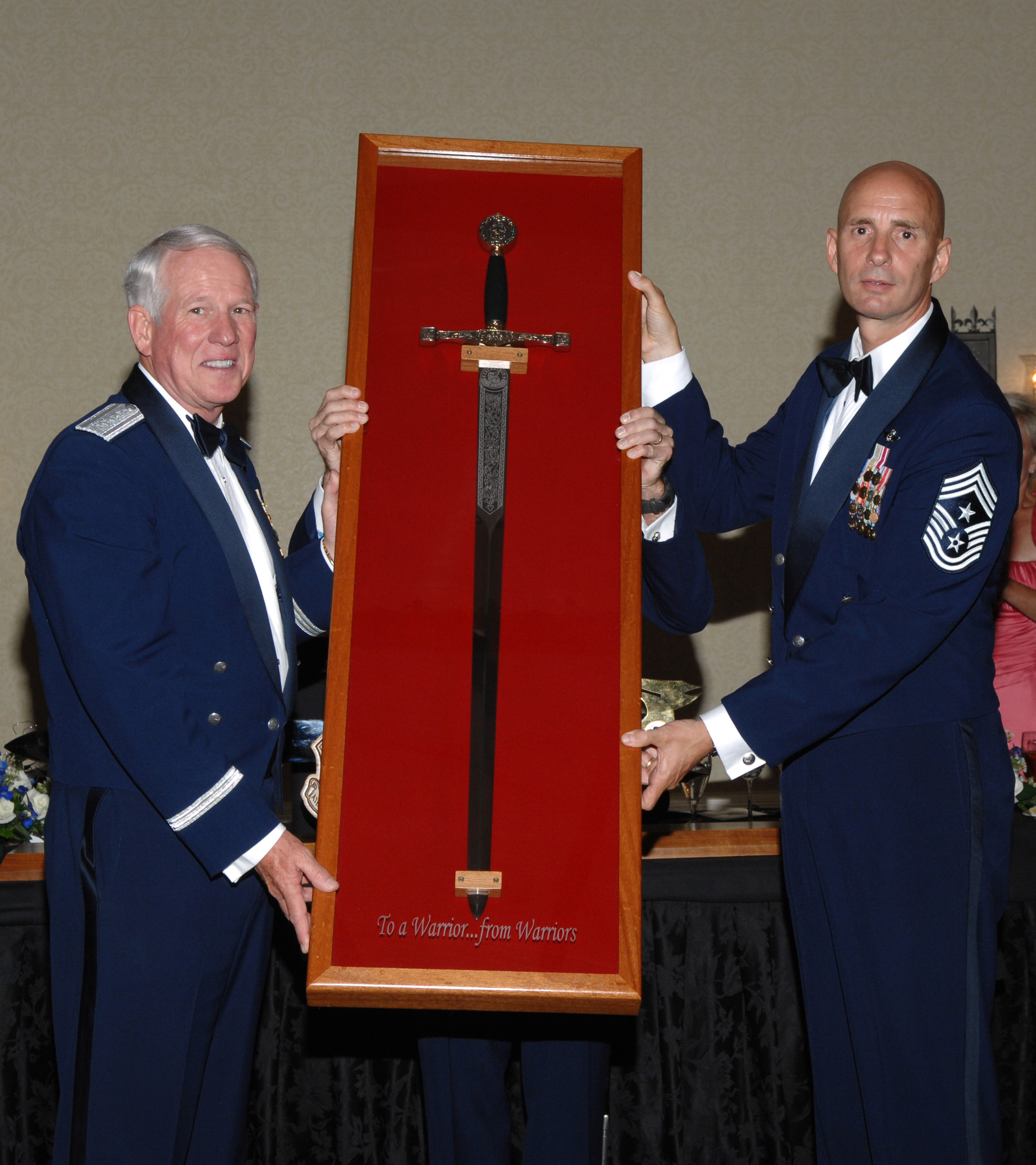
General Looney in 2008

Timothy M. Ray, former Air Force Global Strike Command commander in 2022

Number	Recipient	MAJCOM/FOA	Date
1	Brig Gen Roland J. Barnick	MAC	May 26, 1967
2	Gen Howell M. Estes II	MAC	December 20, 1967
3	Brig Gen Gilbert L. Curtis	MAC	June 18, 1968
4	Brig Gen William V. McBride	MAC	February 26, 1969
5	Col Reid J. Anderson	MAC	July 26, 1969
6	Col Gilbert G. Smith Jr.	MAC	July 29, 1969
7	Col Thomas J. Arbogast	MAC	May 12, 1970
8	Brig Gen Clare T. Ireland Jr.	MAC	July 23, 1970
9	Brig Gen John H. Germeraad	MAC	October 2, 1970
10	Brig Gen John F. Gonge	MAC	February 24, 1972
11	Gen Jack J. Catton	MAC	April 20, 1971
12	Col Leonard V. Gillespie	MAC	September 29, 1971
13	Honorable F. Edward Hebert	MAC	October 28, 1971
14	Maj Gen Archie M. Burke	NORAD	February 11, 1972
15	Brig Gen Richard M. Baughn	USAFE	March 20, 1972
16	Maj Gen William G. Moore Jr.	MAC	May 6, 1972
17	Col Tedd L. Bishop	MAC	July 14, 1972
18	Maj Gen Jerry D. Page	ATC	July 25, 1972
19	Gen George B. Simler	ATC	August 25, 1972
20	Brig Gen Van N. Backman	MAC	September 8, 1972
21	Col Robert H. Campbell	MAC	June 11, 1973
22	Maj Gen Frank M. Madsen Jr.	ATC	January 24, 1974
23	Maj Gen Frank W. Elliott Jr.	ATC	July 26, 1974
24	Col James I. Baginski	PACAF	July 29, 1974
25	Brig Gen Irbey B. Jarvis Jr.	AFLC	October 31, 1974
26	Brig Gen Thomas M. Sadler	MAC	March 12, 1975
27	Maj Gen Lester T. Kearney	MAC	May 21, 1975
28	Col Donald A. Michela	PACAF	August 11, 1975
29	Brig Gen Harry A. Morris	MAC	September 19, 1975
30	Maj Gen Leroy J. Manor	PACAF	April 19, 1976
31	Brig Gen Emil N. Block	MAC	June 9, 1976
32	Brig Gen James E. McAdoo	AFRES	October 11, 1976
33	Lt Gen John W. Roberts	ATC	November 12, 1976
34	Gen Paul K. Carlton	MAC	February 11, 1977
35	Gen Louis L. Wilson Jr.	PACAF	March 18, 1977
36	Gen Russell E. Dougherty	SAC	April 5, 1977
37	Maj Gen Ralph S. Saunders	MAC	May 6, 1977
38	Brig Gen James P. Albritton	USAFE	May 6, 1977
39	Maj Gen Alden G. Glauch	MAC	July 19, 1977
40	Brig Gen Kenneth D. Burns	AFSS	October 20, 1977
41	Maj Gen Andrew P. Iosue	ATC	March 3, 1978
42	Gen Robert J. Dixon	TAC	March 10, 1978
43	Brig Gen James L. Wade	AFRES	March 11, 1978
44	Maj Gen Thomas A. Aldrich	MAC	March 30, 1978
45	Lt Gen Thomas W. Morgan	AFSC	April 22, 1978
46	Col Sharman R. Stevenson	PACAF	May 31, 1978
47	Gen David C. Jones	SAC	May 31, 1978
48	Col Dale L. Oderman	MAC	June 1, 1978
49	Lt Gen James D. Hughes	TAC	June 3, 1978
50	Maj Gen Rupert H. Burris	AFCS	July 19, 1978
51	Maj Gen Paul M. Myers	AFSC	September 14, 1978
52	Lt Gen Bryon M. Shotts	SAC	October 10, 1978
53	Lt Gen Benjamin O. Davis Jr., (Ret)	TAC	November 10, 1978
54	Maj Gen William Lyon	AFRES	March 3, 1979
55	Maj Gen Benjamin F. Starr Jr.	MAC	April 10, 1979
56	Col Anthony J. Dibaggio	USAFSS	April 19, 1979
57	Lt Gen Thomas P. Stafford	AFSC	May 5, 1979
58	Brig Gen Pedroli Attilio	ATC	December 6, 1979
59	Maj Gen William C. Norris	USAFE	April 9, 1980
60	Maj Gen LeRoy W. Svendsen Jr.	AFMPC	April 10, 1980
61	Maj Gen Robert E. Sadler	AFCS	April 12, 1980
62	Lt Gen Winfield Scott Jr.	AAC	May 16, 1980
63	CMSAF Donald L. Harlow, (Ret)	TAC	May 20, 1980
64	Mr. Robert (Bob) Hope	MAC	June 10, 1980
65	Col Thomas G. McInerney	PACAF	July 22, 1980
66	Gen Curtis E. LeMay	SAC	September 18, 1980
67	Gen Alton D. Slay	AFSC	October 18, 1980
68	Brig Gen Sidney S. Novaresi	AFRES	March 14, 1981
69	Brig Gen Alan G. Sharp	AFRES	April 4, 1981
70	Gen Richard H. Ellis	SAC	May 8, 1981
71	Maj Gen John T. Guice	ANG	May 13, 1981
72	Lt Gen Walter D. Druen Jr.	USAFE	May 16, 1981
73	Lt Gen Kenneth L. Tallman	USAFA	May 21, 1981
74	Gen Robert E. Huyser	MAC	June 19, 1981
75	Brig Gen Staryl C. Austin, (Ret)	ANG	October 30, 1981
76	Maj Gen Doyle E. Larson	ESC	March 27, 1982
77	Col Bruce M. Purvine	MAC	June 3, 1982
78	Maj Gen Norma Brown	ATC	June 11, 1982
79	Brig Gen Albert J. Kaehn Jr.	MAC	July 27, 1982
80	Maj Gen Kenneth L. Peek	AFMPC	November 5, 1982
81	Col Lester R. Melott Jr.	ESC	February 13, 1983
82	Lt Gen Richard C. Henry	AFSC	April 16, 1983
83	Lt Gen Robert W. Bazley	USAFE	May 5, 1983
84	Gen James R. Allen	MAC	May 18, 1983
85	Lt Gen Charles L. Donley Jr.	PACAF	May 28, 1983
	Lt Gen Charles L. Donley Jr.	USAFE	February 21, 1987
86	Lt Gen Robert T. Herres	AFCC	August 27, 1983
87	Gen Thomas M. Ryan Jr.	ATC	September 3, 1983
88	Gen W. L. Creech	TAC	February 4, 1984
89	Gen Robert T. Marsh	AFSC	June 16, 1984
90	Gen James V. Hartinger	NORAD/SPACECOM29	June 1984
91	Lt Gen James W. Stansberry	AFSC	September 2, 1984
92	Maj Gen Donald W. Bennett	MAC	October 12, 1984
93	Gen Bennie L. Davis	SAC	October 18, 1984
94	Maj Gen John E. Taylor Jr.	USAFR	October 27, 1984
95	Maj Gen John B. Conaway	ANG	April 10, 1985
96	Brig Gen Regis F. A. Urschler	ESC	May 1, 1985
97	Maj Gen Cornelius Nugteren	AFLC	May 31, 1985
98	Col Paul E. Landers Jr.	MAC	June 17, 1985
99	Maj Gen Sloan R. Gill	AFRES	October 27, 1985
100	Col Robert D. Acres	AFLC	November 2, 1985
101	Gen John L. Piotrowski	TAC	January 24, 1986
102	Col James D. Elmer	MAC	February 8, 1986
103	Gen Charles A. Gabriel	USAF	March 22, 1986
104	Maj Gen Raymond A. Matera	ANG	April 18, 1986
105	Brig Gen George E. Chapman	MAC	April 26, 1986
106	Brig Gen Vernon J. Kondra	MAC	June 14, 1986
107	Col Louis V. Pelini	MAC	July 25, 1986
108	Maj Gen William J. Breckner Jr.	USAFE.	August 30, 1986
109	Gen Earl T. O'Loughlin	AFLC	September 19, 1986
110	Brig Gen Floyd A. Hargrove	MAC	October 11, 1986
111	Maj Gen Gerald L. Prather	AFCC	October 17, 1986
112	Lt Gen Thomas C. Richards	AU	November 1, 1986
113	Maj Gen Chris O. Divich	ATC	January 15, 1987
114	Maj Gen Donald D. Brown	MAC	March 31, 1987
115	Maj Gen Donald Snyder	PACAF	April 8, 1987
116	Gen Lawrence A. Skantze	AFSC	April 25, 1987
117	Brig Gen Richard S. Beyea Jr.	AFOSI	September 25, 1987
118	Col Richard C. Youngs	AFRES	September 26, 1987
119	Maj Gen Jack W. Sheppard	MAC	October 2, 1987
120	Lt Gen Edward L. Tixier	PACAF	January 11, 1988
121	Lt Gen David L. Nichols	AAC	May 7, 1988
122	Congressman Sonny Montgomery	AFRES	May 12, 1988
123	Gen Jack I. Gregory	PACAF	June 21, 1988
124	Maj Gen Ralph E. Spraker	AFSPACECOM	July 1, 1988
125	Honorable Caspar W. Weinberger	USAF	November 19, 1988
126	Maj Gen Melvin G. Alkire	AFCOMS	January 14, 1989
127	Gen William L. Kirk	USAFE	March 18, 1989
128	Brig Gen Alfred P. Bunting	ANG	March 28, 1989
129	Gen Alfred G. Hansen	AFLC	April 28, 1989
130	Maj Gen Paul H. Martin	ESC	July 14, 1989
131	Gen Duane H. Cassidy	MAC	August 18, 1989
132	Maj Gen Fredric F. Doppelt	AFSC	October 7, 1989
133	Maj Gen James C. Wahleithner	AFRES	October 14, 1989
134	Maj Gen Vernon Chong	ATC	December 2, 1989
135	Gen Larry D. Welch	USAF	March 3, 1990
136	Gen Bernard P. Randolph	AFSC	March 17, 1990
137	Col Edmund C. Morrisey Jr., (Ret)	ANG	March 20, 1990
138	Gen Robert D. Russ	TAC	April 20, 1990
139	Maj Gen Robert B. Patterson, (Ret)	MAC	April 20, 1990
140	Lt Gen Robert C. Oaks	ATC	June 9, 1990
141	Maj Gen Larry N. Tibbetts	ATC	June 20, 1990
142	Maj Gen Roger P. Scheer	AFRES	August 25, 1990
143	Maj Gen Paul R. Stoney, (Ret)	AFCC	September 25, 1990
144	Gen Michael J. Dugan	USAFE	November 10, 1990
145	Lt Gen James B. Davis	PACAF	November 24, 1990
146	Maj Gen Paul A. Harvey	ATC	February 2, 1991
147	Lt Gen Charles R. Hamm	USAFA	April 26, 1991
148	Lt Gen Gordon E. Fornell	AFSC	May 11, 1991
149	Gen John T. Chain Jr.	SAC	January 13, 1991
150	Lt Gen Donald L. Cromer	AFSC	May 17, 1991
151	Col Richard F. Law	AFOSI	June 20, 1991
152	Maj Gen Richard M. Pascoe	TAC	July 16, 1991
153	Maj Gen Joseph A. Ahearn	USAF	August 21, 1991
154	Lt Gen Richard J. Trzaskoma	MAC	September 27, 1991
155	Lt Gen Robert H. Ludwig	AFCC	September 28, 1991
156	Gen Charles C. McDonald	AFLC	February 29, 1992
157	Lt Gen Charles A. Horner	TAC	March 14, 1992
158	Lt Gen Clifford H. Rees Jr.	USAFE	July 25, 1992
159	Col Charles L. Fox	PACAF	October 20, 1992
160	Gen Hansford T. Johnson	AMC	February 6, 1993
161	Gen Charles G. Boyd	AU	February 25, 1993
162	Maj Gen John S. Fairfield	AFCC	May 11, 1993
163	Maj Gen Philip G. Killey	ANG	November 9, 1993
164	Gen Ronald Fogleman	AMC	May 14, 1994
165	Maj Gen Robert S. Deligatti	USAFE	April 29, 1994
166	Lt Gen Bradley C. Hosmer	USAFA	April 29, 1994
167	Gen Ronald W. Yates	AFMC	March 5, 1994
168	Maj Gen Robert A. McIntosh	AFRES	July 29, 1994
169	Gen Merrill McPeak	HQ USAF	August 20, 1994
170	Gen Robert L. Rutherford	PACAF	August 23, 1994
171	Gen Henry Viccellio	AETC	October 1, 1994
172	Maj Gen Kenneth A. Minihan	AIA	October 24, 1994
173	Lt Gen Edward P. Barry Jr.	AFMC	November 18, 1994
174	Gen Thomas Moorman	AFSPC	November 28, 1994
175	Gen John Michael Loh	ACC	February 25, 1995
176	Lt Gen Malcolm B. Armstrong	AMC	September 23, 1995
177	Gen James L. Jamerson	USAFE	November 18, 1995
178	Gen Joseph W. Ashy	AFSPC	August 17, 1996
179	Col John E. Killeen	AFSPA	September 14, 1996
180	Dr. William J. Perry	HQ USAF	October 19, 1996
181	Lt Gen James E. Sherrard III	AFRES	November 2, 1996
182	Maj Gen James L. Hobson Jr.	AFSOC	January 24, 1997
183	Gen John G. Lorber	PACAF	June 30, 1997
184	Lt Gen Paul E. Stein	USAFA	July 12, 1997
185	Maj Gen Donald W. Shepperd	NGB	November 4, 1997
186	Col John L. Hayes	AFWA	April 4, 1998
187	Gen Michael E. Ryan	USAFE	April 17, 1998
188	Gen Walter Kross	AMC	July 18, 1998
189	Gen Howell M. Estes III	AFSPC	August 7, 1998
190	Lt Gen Kenneth E. Eickmann	AFMC	August 15, 1998
191	Gen Richard E. Hawley	ACC	April 17, 1999
192	Gen Lloyd W. Newton	AETC	June 18, 1999
193	Col Raymond W. Owens III	AFOSI	October 21, 1999
194	Maj Gen Paul A. Weaver Jr.	ANG	November 22, 1999
195	Gen. Charles R. Holland	AFSOC	January 22, 2000
196	Gen George T. Babbitt	AFMC	March 27, 2000
197	Gen John P. Jumper	USAFE	April 8, 2000
198	Brig Gen (Ret) Steven A. Roser	AMC	April 14, 2000
199	Lt Gen Tad J. Oelstrom	AFSOC	June 7, 2000
200	Brig Gen Richard A. Coleman	AFSFC	August 24, 2000
201	Honorable F. Whitten Peters	HQ USAF	December 16, 2000
202	Brig Gen (Ret) Heinie Aderholt	AFSOC	January 18, 2001
203	Gen Patrick Gamble	PACAF	April 6, 2001
204	Maj Gen David E. Tanzi	AFRES	June 2, 2001
205	Gen Charles T. Robertson	AMC	November 3, 2001
206	Gen Ralph E. Eberhart	AFSC	January 25, 2002
207	Lt Gen Maxwell C. Bailey	AFSOC	March 15, 2002
208	Gen Lester L. Lyles	AFMC	November 7, 2002
209	Gen Gregory S. Martin	USAFE	March 30, 2003
210	Maj Gen Timothy J. McMahon	ACC	October 22, 2004
211	Honorable James G. Roche (SECAF)	HQ USAF	September 13, 2004
212	Gen William J. Begert	PACAF	June 30, 2004
213	Gen Hal M. Hornburg	ACC	October 22, 2004
214	Gen Paul V. Hester	AFSOC	November 5, 2004
215	Lt Gen John D. Hopper Jr.	AETC	December 10, 2004
216	Gen Donald G. Cook	AETC	June 14, 2005
217	Maj Gen Tommy Crawford	11th Wing	July 22, 2005
218	Gen. John W. Handy	AMC	July 29, 2005
219	Gen Robert H. "Doc" Foglesong	USAFE	August 26, 2005
220	Brig Gen Francis X. Taylor	AFOSI	September 16, 2005
221	Lt. Gen. Daniel James III	ANG	November 16, 2005
222	Gen Lance W. Lord	AFSPC	February 11, 2006
223	Gen Duncan McNabb	AMC	September 16, 2007
224	Lt Gen Michael W. Wooley	AFSOC	September 21, 2007
225	Gen Ronald E. Keys	ACC	September 28, 2007
226	Gen William T. Hobbins	USAFE	November 17, 2007
227	Gen Bruce Carlson	AFMC	December 6, 2007
228	Gen William R. Looney III	AETC	May 30, 2008
229	Col. Francis M. Mungavin	USAFR	October 24, 2008
230	Lt Gen Charles L. Johnson II	AFMC	June 20, 2008
231	Lt Gen Robert D. Bishop Jr.	USAFE	July 19, 2008
232	Lt Gen Craig R. McKinley	ANG	November 1, 2008
233	Gen Stephen R. Lorenz	AETC	July 16, 2010
234	Gen Roger A. Brady	USAFE	September 7, 2010
235	Lt. Gen Donald C. Wurster	AFSOC	November 19, 2010
236	Gen Gary L. North	PACAF	August 26, 2011
237	Lt. Gen Michael C. Gould	USAFA	March 19, 2012
238	Gen Donald J. Hoffman	AFMC	March 30, 2012
239	Maj Gen Alfred K. Flowers	AETC	April 6, 2012
240	Gen Raymond E. Johns Jr.	AMC	November 28, 2012
241	Gen Norton A. Schwartz	AFSOC	February 1, 2013
242	Brig Gen Kevin J. Jacobsen	AFOSI	July 8, 2013
243	Honorable Michael B. Donley (SECAF)	USAF	September 13, 2013
244	Lt. Gen. James M. Kowalski	AFGSC	November 6, 2014
245	Gen Frank Gorenc	USAFE	April 7, 2016
246	Lt. Gen Stanley E. Clarke III	ANG	April 17, 2016
247	Gen Mark A. Welsh III	USAF	April 22, 2016
248	Lt. Gen James F. Jackson	USAFR	July 13, 2016
249	Gen Herbert J. "Hawk" Carlisle	ACC	October 27, 2016
250	Lt. Gen Bradley A. Heithold	AFSOC	November 18, 2016
251	Brig Gen Keith M. Givens	AFOSI	May 19, 2017
252	Maj Gen (Ret) Leonard A. Patrick	AETC	February 9, 2018
253	Lt. Gen Darryl Roberson	AETC	September 13, 2018
254	Gen Lori J. Robinson	USAF	August 25, 2019
255	Gen David L. Goldfein	USAF	February 27, 2020
256	Gen James M. Holmes	ACC	August 26, 2020
257	Gen Maryanne Miller	AMC	April 23, 2021
258	Gen (Ret) Robin Rand	AFSGC	April 23, 2021
259	Gen Anthony J. Cotton	AU	April 1, 2022
260	Gen Timothy M. Ray	AFGSC	May 11, 2022
261	Gen Arnold W. Bunch Jr.	AFMC	May 13, 2022
262	Lt Gen Richard W. Scobee	AFRC	July 12, 2022
263	Gen Mark D. Kelly	ACC	August 30, 2022
264	Lt Gen (Ret) Marshall B. Webb	AFSOC/AETC	October 15, 2022
265	Gen Kenneth S. Wilsbach	PACAF	February 8, 2024
266	Lt Gen Michael A. Loh	ANG	February 15, 2024
267	Gen (Ret) Tod D. Wolters	USAFE-AFAFRICA	April 9, 2024
268	Lt Gen Richard M. Clark	USAFA	May 11, 2024
269	Lt Gen Ricky N. Rupp	PACAF	October 4, 2024
