= Norma Brown =

Norma Brown may refer to:

- Norma Parker (1906–2004), married name Brown, Australian social worker and educator
- Norma Elaine Brown (1926–2003), U.S. Air Force general
