= Thomas Aldrich =

Thomas Aldrich(e), Aldridge or Aldredge may refer to:

- Thomas Bailey Aldrich (1836–1907), American writer, poet, critic and editor
- Thomas Aldriche (by 1515–1562), English politician
- Thomas Aldridge (born 1982), English actor
- Tommy Aldridge (born 1950), American drummer
- Tom Aldredge (1928–2011), American actor
- Thomas Aldrich (academic) (died 1576), English priest and academic
- Thomas A. Aldrich (1923–2019), United States Air Force general
