= Joseph A. Ahearn =

United States Air Force general

Joseph August Ahearn
- Born: September 5, 1936; Galesburg, Illinois, U.S.
- Died: July 11, 2018 (aged 81); Greenwood Village, Colorado, U.S.
- Education: University of Notre Dame (BS, 1958); Syracuse University (MS, 1967); Harvard University (AMP, 1988)
- Military career
- Allegiance: United States
- Branch: United States Air Force
- Rank: Major General
- Nickname: Bud
- Commands: 554th Red Horse Squadron; Civil Engineer, Headquarters U.S. Air Force
- Conflicts: Vietnam War
- Awards: Distinguished Service Medal; Legion of Merit; Bronze Star Medal; Order of the Sword
- Other work: Vice Chair, CH2M HILL

Joseph August Ahearn (September 5, 1936 – July 10, 2018) was a major general in the United States Air Force.

== Biography ==
Ahearn was born in Galesburg, Illinois, in 1936. He received a bachelor's degree in civil engineering from the University of Notre Dame in 1958 and a master's degree in engineering from Syracuse University in 1967.

== Career ==
Ahearn joined the Air Force in 1958. His first assignment was at Vandenberg Air Force Base, where he was a construction engineer and programmer. From there, he was assigned to Goose Air Base in Happy Valley - Goose Bay, Newfoundland. In 1963, he transferred to Headquarters Eighth Air Force as a missile maintenance engineer before becoming Director of Engineering and Construction the following year.

Ahearn would be stationed in Frankfurt, West Germany from 1967 to 1970, at which time he was deployed to serve in the Vietnam War. After returning to the United States, he was named a squadron commander at Craig Air Force Base before transferring to Headquarters Air Training Command.

In 1976, Ahearn was assigned to The Pentagon, and in 1983, he returned to West Germany to serve as Deputy Chief of Staff for Engineering and Services at Headquarters United States Air Forces in Europe. He returned to The Pentagon in 1989 as Director of Engineering and Services in the Office of the Deputy Chief of Staff for Logistics and Engineering and was named Civil Engineer, Headquarters U.S. Air Force in 1991.

His retirement was effective as of January 1, 1992, concluding a 34-year military career that culminated in his service as the Senior Civil Engineer of the Air Force. Next, he was employed by the engineering consulting firm CH2M HILL to secure work through Ahearn's connection with the Pentagon. The effectiveness of Ahearn's military/dictatorial approach to leadership as applied to civilian organizations was questioned by many at CH2M. In particular, several executives of CH2M's transportation executive team soon left the firm citing Ahearn as the impetus for their decision to leave. In retaliation, Ahearn applied pressure to blackball those executives and their affiliates. In particular, Tom Huntsinger, a longtime CH2M Hill executive and employee of over twenty five years who questioned Ahearn's unethical conduct. Huntsinger's career was impacted to the point that he became distraught and took his life. CH2M defended Ahearn's action as not being so "outrageous" as to be actionable under Colorado law, although engineering professional rules of conduct were found to have been violated by Ahearn, a story fabricated by those opposed to his hiring.

During his career, Ahearn became affiliated with the American Society of Civil Engineers, the Society of American Military Engineers, the National Society of Professional Engineers and the American Public Works Association. Additionally, he became a Centurion of the Roman Catholic Archdiocese for the Military Services, USA. The Major General Joseph A. Ahearn Enlisted Leadership Award given by the Air Force Civil Engineer Support Agency is named after him.

Awards he received include the Air Force Distinguished Service Medal, the Legion of Merit, the Bronze Star Medal, the Defense Meritorious Service Medal, the Meritorious Service Medal with three oak leaf clusters, the Air Force Commendation Medal, the Outstanding Unit Award with valor device and the Armed Forces Honor Medal of South Vietnam.

He was elected to the National Academy of Engineering in 2010 "for contributions to improving the environment and transportation infrastructure through engineering and construction projects." In 2012, he received the Carroll H. Dunn Award of Excellence from the Construction Industry Institute.
