= Alan G. Sharp =

US Air Force commander (1929–2016)

Alan Giles Sharp
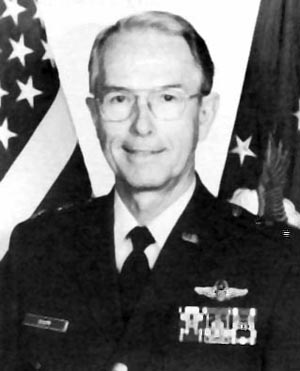
- Born: November 7, 1929; Salt Lake City, Utah, U.S.
- Died: August 11, 2016 (aged 86)
- Military career
- Allegiance: United States of America
- Branch: United States Air Force
- Service years: 1953–1990
- Rank: Major General
- Awards: Order of the Sword, others below

Alan Giles Sharp (November 7, 1929 – August 11, 2016) was a major general in the United States Air Force who served as vice commander of the United States Air Force Reserve, with headquarters at Robins Air Force Base, Georgia.

Sharp was born in 1929, in Salt Lake City into a Mormon family. He attended high school in Cape Town, Union of South Africa, and graduated from the University of Utah in 1953. He completed Air War College in 1977. He was commissioned as a second lieutenant through the Air Force Reserve Officer Training Corps program in March 1953. After completing pilot training at Goodfellow Air Force Base, Texas, he was assigned to Sewart Air Force Base, Tenn., flying C-119s with the 48th Troop Carrier Squadron. He participated in Operation DEW Line during the construction of the Distant Early Warning Radar System across northern Canada.

After his release from active duty in 1957, Sharp joined the Air Force Reserve and was assigned to the 733rd Troop Carrier Squadron, Hill Air Force Base, Utah, flying C-46 Commandos. He later served as flight commander, group operations staff officer and flight examiner in C-119s and C-124s. After being recalled to active duty during the Cuban Missile Crisis in October 1962, he returned to reserve status and subsequently became deputy commander for operations of the 945th Military Airlift Group at Hill in July 1969.

He was appointed commander of the 940th Tactical Airlift Group, McClellan Air Force Base, California, in November 1972. In July 1976 he took command of the 445th Military Airlift Wing (Associate), Norton Air Force Base, Calif., and qualified as a C-141 pilot. He became commander of the 514th Military Airlift Wing (Associate), McGuire Air Force Base, New Jersey, in July 1977. He was named commander of the 94th Tactical Airlift Wing at Dobbins Air Force Base, Ga., in April 1981 and became commander of 14th Air Force there in January 1983. He assumed his present duties in December 1986.

Sharp joined the Air Reserve Technician force in February 1960. He served continuously in that capacity, except for a period from 1962 to 1964.

He is a command pilot with more than 8,000 flying hours. His military decorations and awards include the Distinguished Service Medal, Legion of Merit with oak leaf cluster, Meritorious Service Medal with oak leaf cluster, Air Force Commendation Medal, Air Force Outstanding Unit Award with three oak leaf clusters, Combat Readiness Medal with four oak leaf clusters, National Defense Service Medal with service star, Armed Forces Expeditionary Medal, Vietnam Service Medal with seven service stars, Air Force Longevity Service Award Ribbon with six oak leaf clusters, Armed Forces Reserve Medal with two hourglass devices, Small Arms Expert Marksmanship Ribbon, Air Force Training Ribbon, Republic of Vietnam Gallantry Cross with Palm, and Republic of Vietnam Campaign Medal.

His civic affiliations include the Reserve Officers Association, Air Force Association and Military Order of the World Wars.

He was promoted to major general May 24, 1984, with same date of rank. Sharp retired on December 1, 1990. He is a member of the Church of Jesus Christ of Latter-day Saints.
