= David L. Nichols =

David Lee Nichols
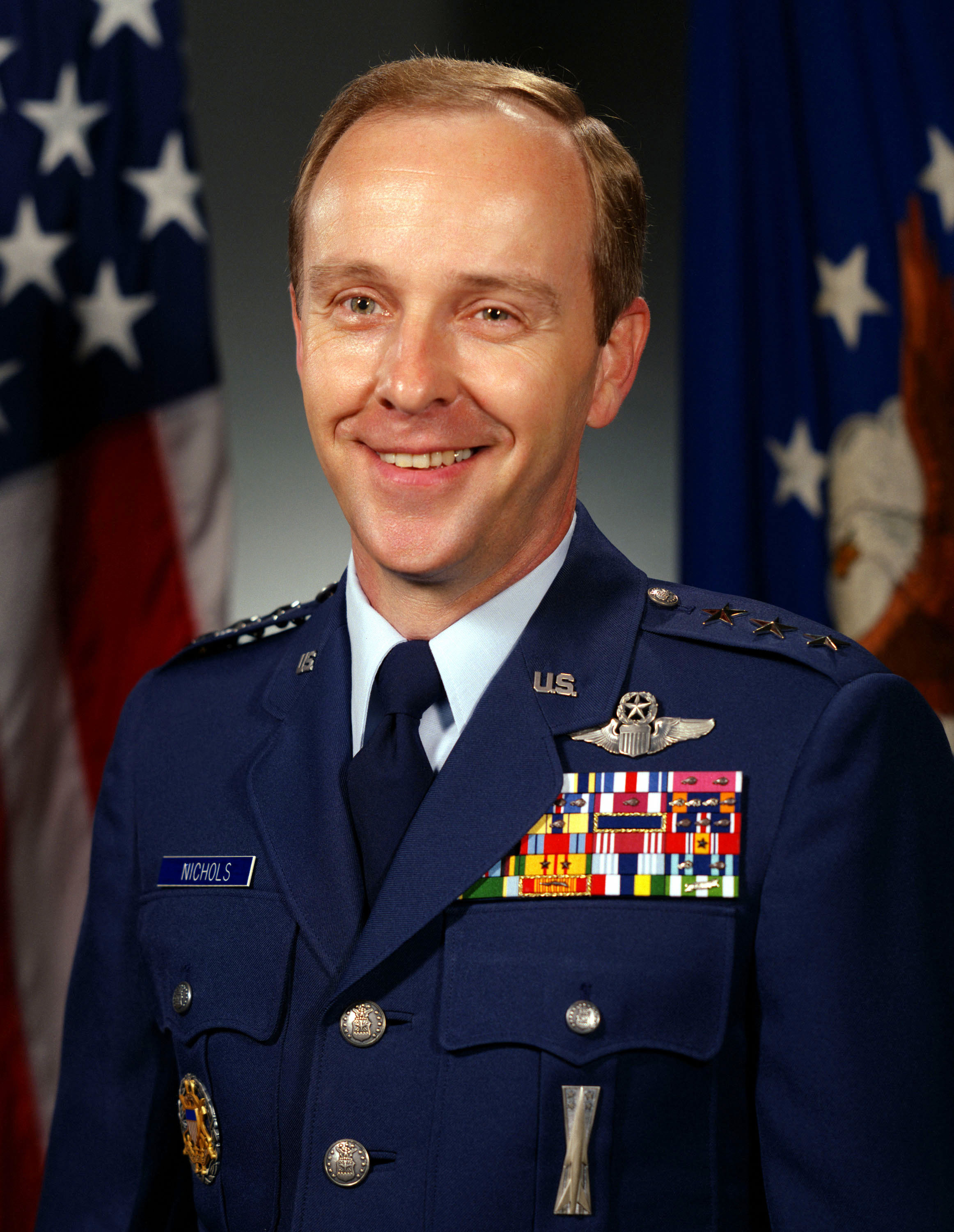
- Born: January 18, 1934; Iola, Kansas, US
- Died: April 5, 1997 (age 63) Charlotte, North Carolina, US
- Buried: Arlington National Cemetery
- Branch: United States Air Force
- Service years: 1955-1988
- Rank: lieutenant general
- Awards: Distinguished Service Medal; Silver Star; Legion of Merit with two oak clusters Distinguished Flying Cross with three oak leaf clusters Meritorious Service Medal with oak leaf cluster Air Medal with 16 oak leaf clusters Air Force Commendation Medal with oak leaf cluster
- Education: Oklahoma State University; University of Southern California; Air Command and Staff College; Air War College

David L. Nichols (January 18, 1934 – April 5, 1997) was a lieutenant general in the United States Air Force (USAF). He flew 100 combat missions over North Vietnam, collected 8,800+ flying hours, and held command three times.

He was the first director of the Air Force's ground-launched cruise missile planning group and oversaw the construction of six bases in five NATO countries.

== Personal life and death ==
Nichols married his wife, Janice Lesan, in 1958. They remained married until his death. She died in 2003 and they are buried together at Arlington National Cemetery.

He died on April 5, 1997.

== Career and awards ==
Nichols joined the military in 1955.

As a fighter pilot, he flew 100 missions over North Vietnam in the F-105D as part of Operation Rolling Thunder. He was a Wild Weasel, which was a program that outfitted his aircraft with anti-radiation missiles and tasked with the suppression of enemy air defenses. He accrued over 8,800 flying hours.

Nichols helped the deployment of the ground-launched weapon system from 1980 to 1985. He was the first director of the Air Force's ground-launched missile planning ground. Later on, he established and then directed the ground-launched cruise missile planning group in Europe. He helped manage the missiles beddown activities and oversaw the building of six bases in five North Atlantic Treaty Organization countries.

Awards
	Silver Star
Width-44 crimson ribbon with a pair of width-2 white stripes on the edges	Legion of Merit with two oak leaf clusters
	Distinguished Flying Cross with three oak leaf clusters
Width-44 white ribbon with width-10 scarlet stripes at edges, separated from the white by width-2 ultramarine blue stripes.	Distinguished Service Medal
	Meritorious Service Medal with oak leaf cluster
	Air Medal with 16 oak leaf clusters
	Air Force Commendation Medal with oak leaf cluster
no ribbon	Order of the Sword

== Assignments ==
Time	Title	Assignment	Station	Location
August 1955 - April 1959	navigator in C-118	30th Air Transport Squadron, 1611th Air Transport Wing	McGuire AFB	Burlington County, New Jersey
April 1959 - April 1967	student	Vance AFB		Enid, Oklahoma
April 1959 - April 1967	instructor pilot	Vance AFB		Enid, Oklahoma
April 1959 - April 1967	stan board evaluator	Vance AFB		Enid, Oklahoma
January 1967 - January 1968	fighter pilot, F-105D	357th Tactical Fighter Squadron, 355th Tactical Fighter Wing	Takhli Royal Thai AFB	Thailand
January 1968 - July 1970	instructor pilot	23rd Tactical Fighter Wing	McConnell AFB	Wichita, Kansas
January 1968 - July 1970	wing chief of safety	23rd Tactical Fighter Wing	McConnell AFB	Wichita, Kansas
July 1970 - May 1972	chief of safety	18th Tactical Fighter Wing	Kadena AFB	Okinawa, Japan
July 1970 - May 1972	Commander	12th Tactical Fighter Squadron	Kadena AFB	Okinawa, Japan
May 1972 - May 1973	student	Air War College	Maxwell AFB	Montgomery, Alabama
May 1973 - August 1975	Air Force military assistant to the Assistant Secretary of Defense for Atomic Energy	Headquarters USAF	Pentagon	Arlington, Virginia
August 1975 - April 1977	chief of staff	Headquarters 9th Air Force	Shaw AFB	Sumter, South Carolina
April 1977 - July 1979	Commander	33rd Tactical Fighter Wing	Eglin AFB	Okaloosa County, Florida
July 1979 - March 1980	Deputy Director for Operations and Training	Headquarters USAF	Pentagon	Arlington, VA
March 1980 - July 1981	Deputy Director for Plans and Policy	Headquarters USAF	Pentagon	Arlington, VA
July 1981 - October 1982	Deputy Chief of Staff for Plans	Headquarters US Air Forces in Europe	Ramstein Air Base	Rhineland-Palatinate, Germany
October 1982 - August 1983	command's Chief of Staff	Headquarters US Air Forces in Europe	Ramstein Air Base	Rhineland-Palatinate, Germany
August 1983 - June 1984	Assistant Deputy Chief of Staff for Plans and Operations	Headquarters USAF	Pentagon	Arlington, Virginia
June 1984 - September 1985	Deputy Chief of Staff for Plans and Operations	Headquarters USAF	Pentagon	Arlington, Virginia
June 1984 - September 1985	Air Force operations deputy to the Joint Chiefs of Staff	Headquarters USAF	Pentagon	Arlington, Virginia
September 1985 - July 1988	Commander	Alaskan Air Command	Elmendorf AFB	Anchorage, Alaska
September 1985 - July 1988	Commander	Alaskan North American Aerospace Defense Command Region	Elmendorf AFB	Anchorage, Alaska
September 1985 - July 1988	Commander	Joint Task Force-Alaska	Elmendorf AFB	Anchorage, Alaska
