= John W. Roberts =

American air force general (1921–1999)

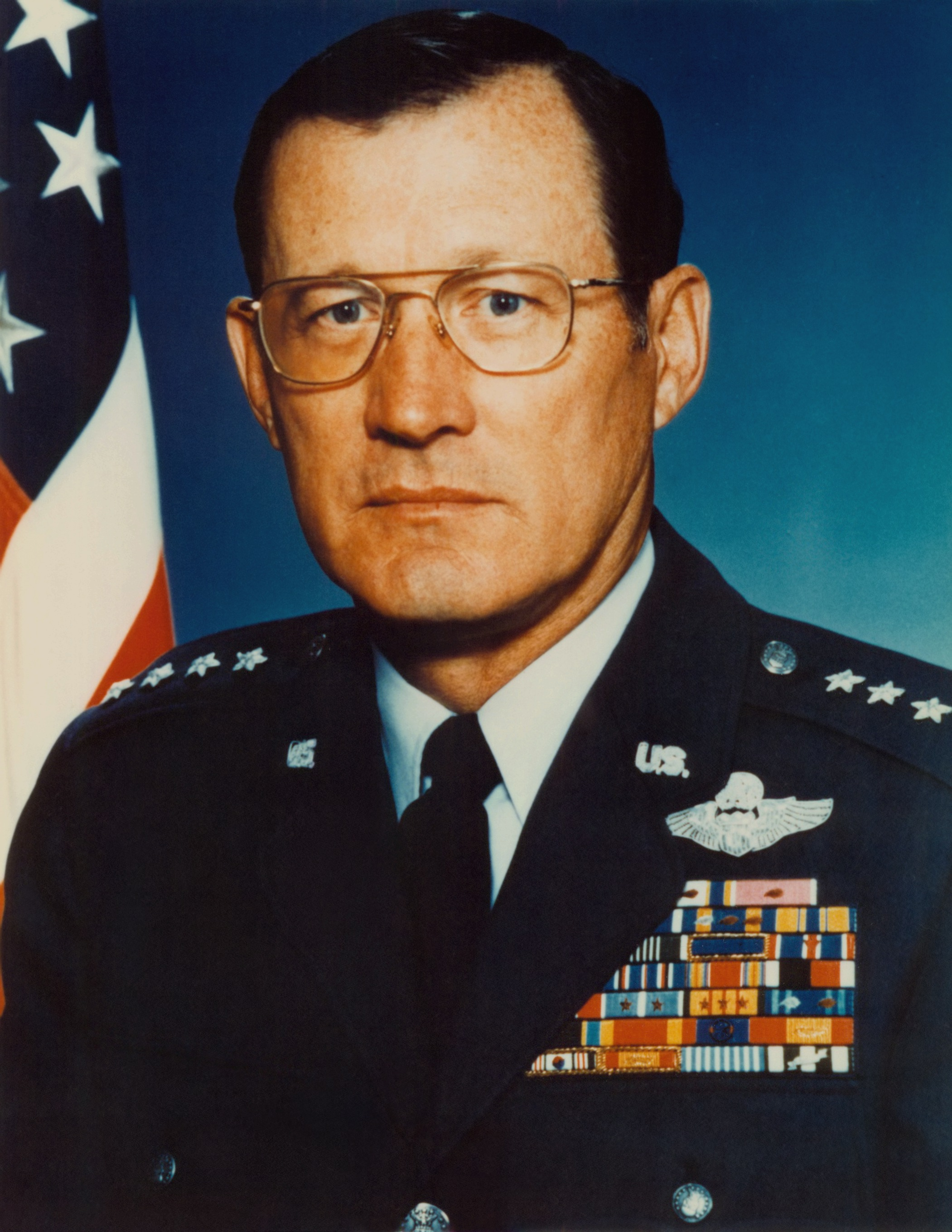
- Roberts' four star general portrait as Commander of the Air Training Command
- Born: January 1, 1921; Mankato, Minnesota
- Died: January 8, 1999 (aged 78); San Antonio, Texas
- Military career
- Allegiance: United States
- Branch: United States Air Force
- Service years: 1944–1979
- Rank: General
- Commands: 3529th Combat Crew Training Squadron; 4453rd Combat Crew Training Wing; 366th Tactical Fighter Wing; Director Tactical Air Control Center; Air Training Command
- Conflicts: World War II; Cold War; Korean War; Vietnam War

John Wendell Roberts (January 1, 1921 – January 8, 1999) was a United States Air Force general and commander of the Air Training Command with headquarters at Randolph Air Force Base, Texas. He had a bachelor of science degree from Minnesota State University, Mankato and a master's degree from The George Washington University. He was also a graduate of the Air Command and Staff College and the National War College.

== Biography ==
=== Early life ===
A native of Mankato, Minnesota, he received his commission and pilot wings through the aviation cadet program in February 1944. His first assignment was as an instructor pilot at Luke Field, Arizona.

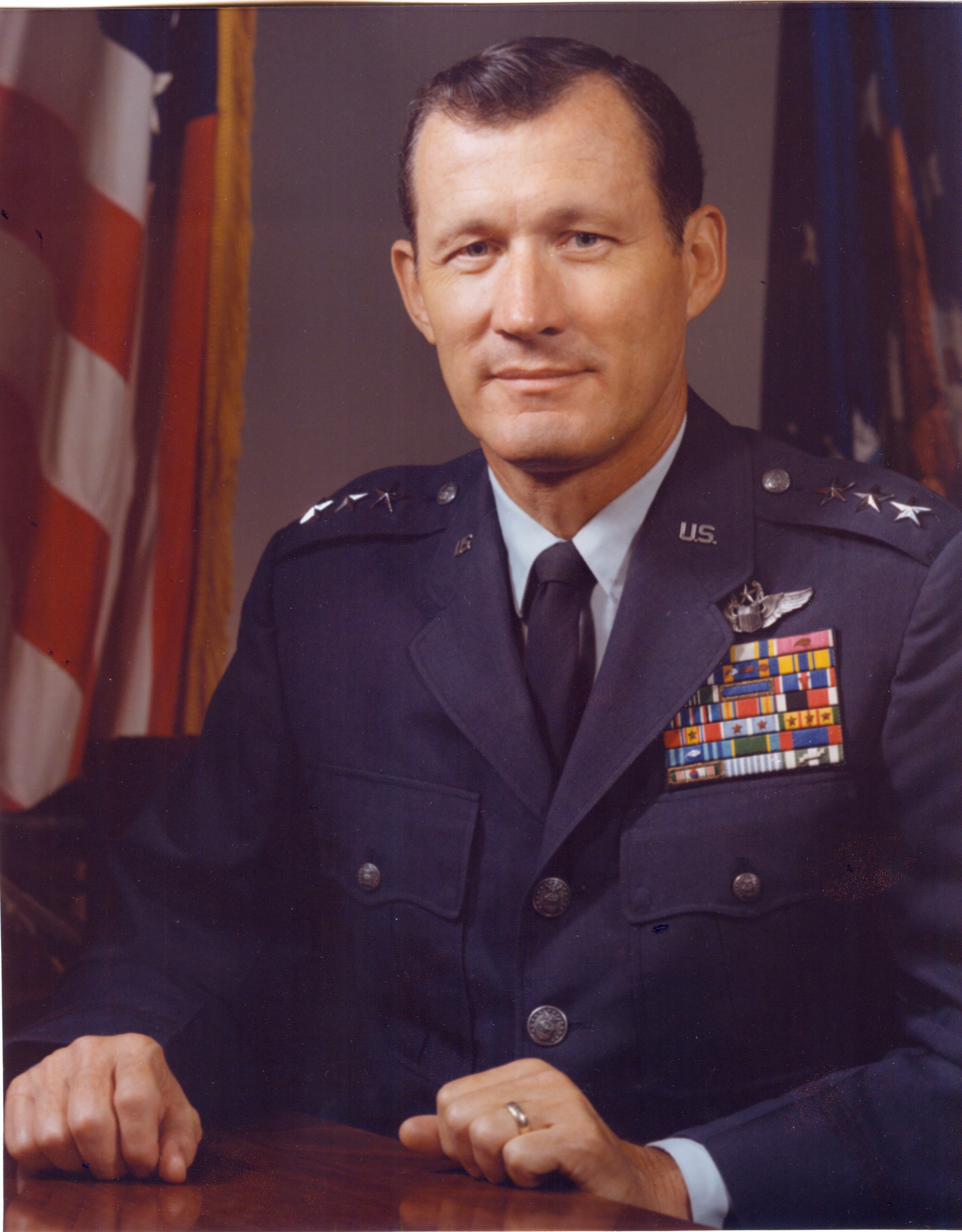
General John W. Roberts

Two years later, he was reassigned to a fighter wing in Germany. In April 1949, he returned to instructor pilot duties in the Fighter Weapons School at Nellis Air Force Base, Nevada. There he won the trophy for top individual scoring in the first United States Air Force Fighter Weapons Meet. He was next assigned to Korea where he flew combat missions in the F-84 Thunderjet and F-86 Sabre aircraft. While in Korea, he served as flight commander and squadron operations officer.

In 1954, he received his first of three assignments to Headquarters Air Training Command. His assignment was as an operations staff officer. In 1957, he commanded the 3529th Combat Crew Training Squadron at Williams Air Force Base, Arizona, and in November of that year returned to Headquarters Air Training Command again as an operations staff officer.

=== Later career ===
In August 1958, Roberts served with Headquarters 12th Air Force at Waco, Texas, first as an operations officer and later as chief of the Combat Crew Directorate. He was transferred to Headquarters Pacific Air Forces, Hickam Air Force Base, Hawaii, in September 1961.

Following graduation from the National War College in 1965, he was assigned to the Pentagon, where he was first the assistant chief of the Special Warfare Division, Directorate of Plans and Operations, Headquarters United States Air Force; and in October 1966 chief, Systems Division, Defense Communications Planning Group, at the Naval Observatory.

In October 1967, he became vice commander, 4453rd Combat Crew Training Wing, Davis-Monthan Air Force Base, Arizona, and in December 1968, commander of the 366th Tactical Fighter Wing, Da Nang Air Base, Vietnam. After 10 months at Da Nang, he moved to Headquarters Seventh Air Force, Tan Son Nhut Air Base, Vietnam, where he was the director of the Tactical Air Control Center.

In August 1970, General Roberts returned to Washington D.C., where he served in the Office of the Deputy Chief of Staff, Personnel, as deputy director of personnel planning, and later director, personnel plans. He became the deputy chief of staff, personnel, in October 1973. For his contributions to Air Force personnel resource programs management, he was awarded the 1975 Eugene M. Zuckert Management Award.

He became the commander of the Air Training Command in August 1975. He was promoted to the rank of general on March 29, 1977, with the same date of rank.

He retired two years and two days later on March 31, 1977. Reflecting on his career, he said about his failures, "I crashed two aircraft when I was a captain, a B-25 and later an F-86. Both were pilot error. I cracked up the F-86 in the woods in Michigan where the only thing left after the crash were the engine and me."

== Awards ==
Awards earned during his career:

- Air Force Distinguished Service Medal with an oak leaf cluster
- Silver Star
- Legion of Merit with an oak leaf cluster
- Distinguished Flying Cross with an oak leaf cluster
- Air Medal with seven oak leaf clusters
- Order of the Sword
