= Roland J. Barnick =

United States Air Force general

Roland John Barnick
- Born: January 9, 1917; Max, North Dakota
- Died: January 28, 1996 (aged 79)
- Military career
- Allegiance: United States
- Branch: U.S. Army Air Corps; United States Air Force
- Service years: 1939–1967
- Rank: Brigadier general
- Commands: 63rd Troop Carrier Wing; 438th Military Airlift Wing
- Conflicts: World War II; Korean War
- Awards: Silver Star; Bronze Star Medal; Order of the Sword

Roland John Barnick (January 9, 1917 – January 28, 1996) was an American military pilot and general. He served in World War II and the Korean War.

Barnick's last post was commander of the 438th Military Airlift Wing, with headquarters at McGuire Air Force Base, N.J. The wing was the major Military Airlift Command operational unit on the East Coast, and was responsible for meeting airlift requirements in the Eastern United States, the Atlantic area and to the West Coast for shipment to Southeast Asia.

== Early life and education ==
Barnick was born in 1917 in Max, North Dakota. His parents were John and Stacy (Kankovsky) Barnick, both Ukrainian immigrants. In 1934, he graduated from Max High School and entered North Dakota State College. There he received a Bachelor of Science degree in mathematics and chemistry in June 1938.

Upon graduation from college, he joined the United States Army Air Corps as an aviation cadet. He was awarded pilot's wings and commissioned a second lieutenant in 1939 at Kelly Field, Texas.

== Career ==
=== Early career and World War II ===
His first assignment after Kelly was the Philippine Islands. In Manila, he commanded the Headquarters Squadron, Far East Air Service Command. After the Japanese attack on Pearl Harbor, he took his squadron to Bataan. When Bataan fell, Barnick flew General Carlos Romulo to safety in Mindanao aboard the last plane to leave. For this feat, he was awarded the Silver Star.

Following the fall of Bataan, Barnick continued to serve in the Southwest Pacific and was soon promoted to captain. In May 1942, he returned to the United States to command a B-17 squadron in Boise, Idaho. Shortly thereafter he was assigned as commander of a B-17 provisional group, training for combat duty. The B-17 group deployed to England under his command. Upon return to the United States, he was appointed commander of a B-24 training group at Tonopah, Nevada. During this assignment, he was promoted to lieutenant colonel and became deputy commander of a B-29 group. Later, as the commander of the B-29 group, he went to the Southwest Pacific and led his unit in bombardment activities against the Japanese homeland. Barnick was awarded the Bronze Star for his service during this period.

=== After World War II ===
At the end of World War II, he served in Japan with a troop carrier group flying C-54 aircraft. Following duty in Japan, he became professor of air science at the University of Wyoming, where he remained until 1950. On July 3, he was promoted to colonel.

When the Korean War began, Barnick was assigned to Headquarters Continental Air Command at Mitchel Air Force Base, New York, as chief of the Mobilization Branch. In this capacity, he was responsible for the mobilization of a large number of Air Force reservists who served in the Korean War.

In 1953, he was appointed director of military personnel for U.S. Air Forces in Europe at Wiesbaden, Germany. After three years in this assignment, Barnick was selected to attend the Industrial College of the Armed Forces, in Washington, D.C., for a year.

=== 63rd Troop Carrier Group ===
Barnick was assigned as commander of the 63rd Troop Carrier Group at Donaldson Air Force Base, S.C. in June 1957, after completing studies at the Industrial College of the Armed Forces. His group executed many successful missions of international significance. History was made at the South Pole when unprecedented paradrops of supplies and equipment were completed to the American Scientific Station. During the Lebanon crisis in 1958, his Task Force airlifted military units and equipment to the troubled area to help preserve the peace. His aircraft and crews established records throughout the world by moving tons of cargo and passengers on short notice in support of national policy.

After two and one-half years as commander of the 63rd Troop Carrier Group, he was assigned to Headquarters Military Air Transport Service as inspector general. He served in this capacity from June 1960 until July 1961, when he was appointed chief of staff of the Military Air Transport Service.

Reassigned to Donaldson in September 1961, Barnick became commander of the 63rd Troop Carrier Wing. The organization was moved from Donaldson Air Force Base, S.C., to Hunter Air Force Base, Georgia. in April 1963. During the period of this movement, Barnick's organization maintained normally heavy commitments, even though operating from two separate bases. He assumed this position in June 1964.

Following his assignment to McGuire, Barnick was nominated for promotion to brigadier general by President Lyndon B. Johnson in August 1964. On Sept. 16, the promotion became effective.

== Later life ==
On 1 August 1967, he retired from active service as a general and command pilot, having logged more than 5,000 hours.

== Awards and decorations ==
- Silver Star (1942)
- Bronze Star Medal (194?)
- American Defense Service Medal with "Foreign Service" clasp
- American Campaign Medal
- Asiatic-Pacific Campaign Medal with two campaign stars
- World War II Victory Medal
- Army of Occupation Medal with "ASIA" clasp
- National Defense Service Medal with star
- Air Force Longevity Service Ribbon
- Philippine Defense Medal
- Order of the Sword (26 May 1967) (First recipient.)
