= LeRoy W. Svendsen Jr. =

United States Air Force general (1928–2022)

Leroy W. Svendsen Jr. (December 26, 1928 – February 15, 2022) was a major general in the United States Air Force.

== Biography ==
Svendsen was born in Chicago, Illinois on December 26, 1928. He attended Florida State University. Svendsen died on February 15, 2022, at the age of 93.

== Career ==
Svendsen joined the Air Force in 1948. During the Korean War he was stationed at Johnson Air Base and Taegu Air Base. Following the war he was stationed at Truax Field. Later he served in the Vietnam War. In 1966 he was stationed at The Pentagon and later served in the Office of the United States Secretary of the Air Force as a liaison for the United States House of Representatives. From 1974 to 1975 he was in command of the 29th Flying Training Wing. Svendsen was appointed Defense Attaché to Egypt in 1975. In 1977 he was given command of the Air Force Manpower and Personnel Center and was stationed at Randolph Air Force Base. His retirement was effective as of June 1, 1980.

Awards he received included the Air Force Distinguished Service Medal, the Legion of Merit, the Distinguished Flying Cross, the Bronze Star Medal, the Meritorious Service Medal, the Air Medal with silver oak leaf cluster and four bronze oak leaf clusters, the Air Force Commendation Medal with oak leaf cluster, and the Outstanding Unit Award. Svendsen was also a member of the Order of the Sword.
