= Alfred K. Flowers =

US Air Force general

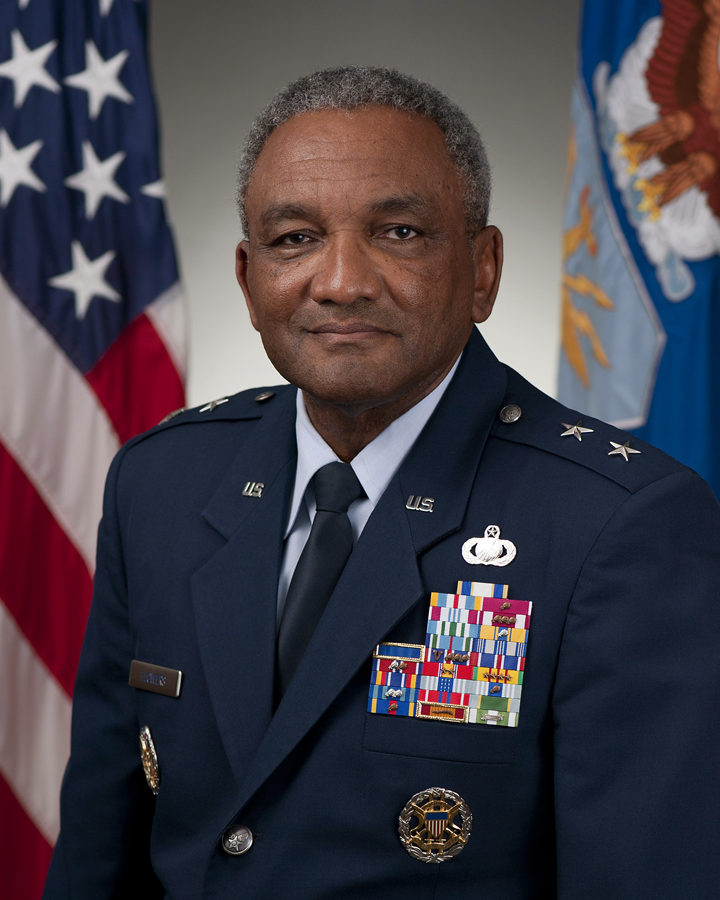
- Major General Alfred K. Flowers
- Born: December 29, 1947 (age 78); Jones County, North Carolina
- Relatives: Alfred K. Flowers Jr. (son)
- Military career
- Allegiance: United States
- Branch: United States Air Force
- Service years: 1965–2012
- Rank: Major General
- Commands: Second Air Force; Air Force Officer Accession and Training Schools
- Conflicts: Vietnam War
- Awards: Air Force Distinguished Service Medal; Defense Superior Service Medal; Legion of Merit (2)

Alfred K. Flowers (born December 29, 1947) is a retired United States Air Force major general who served in many roles, culminating as Deputy Assistant Secretary for Budget. At the time of his retirement, Flowers had served more than 46 years on active duty, making him the longest-serving airman in Air Force history and the longest serving African American in the history of the United States Department of Defense. Prior to his retirement, the enlisted members of Air Education and Training Command presented Flowers with the Order of the Sword, the Air Force enlisted force's highest honor for officer leadership.

== Early life ==
Flowers was born in Jones County, North Carolina on December 29, 1947. He was raised in rural Jones County near Phillips Crossroads. At the age of ten, he started working in the fields with his grandparents, who were sharecroppers. He graduated from Jones High School in 1965. Flowers could not afford to attend college so after graduating, he decided to enlist in the Air Force. Because he was only seventeen, his grandmother had to sign a release allowing him to enlist. Flowers entered the Air Force on 5 August 1965.

== Enlisted service ==
After completing basic military training at Lackland Air Force Base in San Antonio, Texas, Flowers was assigned to duty as a supply warehouseman at Grand Forks Air Force Base, North Dakota. After two years at Grand Forks, he was retransferred into the air transportation career field and sent to Da Nang Air Base, Republic of Vietnam. At Da Nang, Flowers was responsible for collecting casualties, hauling wounded and deceased soldiers out of the jungle at night.

When his tour in Vietnam was completed, Flowers was reassigned at Norton Air Force Base, California. While at Norton, he met his wife, who was also serving in the Air Force. Two weeks after they were married, she was transferred to Clark Air Base in the Philippines. Six months later, Flowers secured a join-spouse assignment at Clark. During his tour in the Philippines, Flowers began working toward a college degree. When he returned from his overseas assignment, Flowers was retrained as an accounting specialist and assigned to Lackland Air Force Base and then to Charleston Air Force Base, South Carolina.

When he completed his bachelor's degree in 1975, Flowers applied for Air Force Officer Training School and was accepted. Shortly after his acceptance, his wife (who was still enlisted) was reassigned to Iraklion Air Base in Greece. Because there was no guarantee of a joint assignment after officer training, he gave up his officer training slot and went with his family to Greece. In 1976, Flowers finished his master's degree and re-applied to the officer training; however, his application was denied. He applied again in 1977 and was denied again. In the meantime, he was reassigned to Travis Air Force Base, California and select for promotion to master sergeant, the Air Force's third highest enlisted grade. While he was waiting to pin on his new rank, he applied for officer training once again. This time he was accepted.

== Air Force officer ==
In 1978, Flowers was commissioned as a second lieutenant in the financial management career field. His first officer assignment was at Moody Air Force Base, Georgia. During that three-year tour Flowers served as deputy accounting and finance officer, then accounting and finance officer, and finally as the base's budget officer. He then went to headquarters Tactical Air Command at Langley Air Force Base, Virginia, serving as a command level budget officer for three years.

In July 1985, Flowers was selected for an assignment at Air Force headquarters in The Pentagon. He served three years there, first as a budget officer and then as an executive officer. He attended the Armed Forces Staff College in Norfolk, Virginia from July 1989 until January 1990. After graduating from that joint military education program, he was assigned to headquarters Air Combat Command at Langley Air Force Base, as chief of the command's Budget Operations Division.

In August 1993, Flowers was selected to attend the Industrial College of the Armed Forces at Fort Lesley J. McNair in Washington, receiving a Master of Science degree from the college in June 1994. This was followed by a budget officer assignment in the office of the Joint Chiefs of Staff at the Pentagon. In December 1996, Flowers was again assigned to headquarters Air Combat Command, where he served as the command's budget chief. During the assignment, he was promoted to colonel.

In June 1999, Flowers returned to the Pentagon for another tour, this time as director of Budget Programs in the office of the Assistant Secretary of the Air Force for Financial Management and Comptroller. Three years later, he was sent to headquarters Air Education and Training Command at Randolph Air Force Base, Texas as the command's comptroller. He was then assigned to headquarters United States Special Operations Command at MacDill Air Force Base, Florida. While at MacDill, he was promoted to brigadier general.

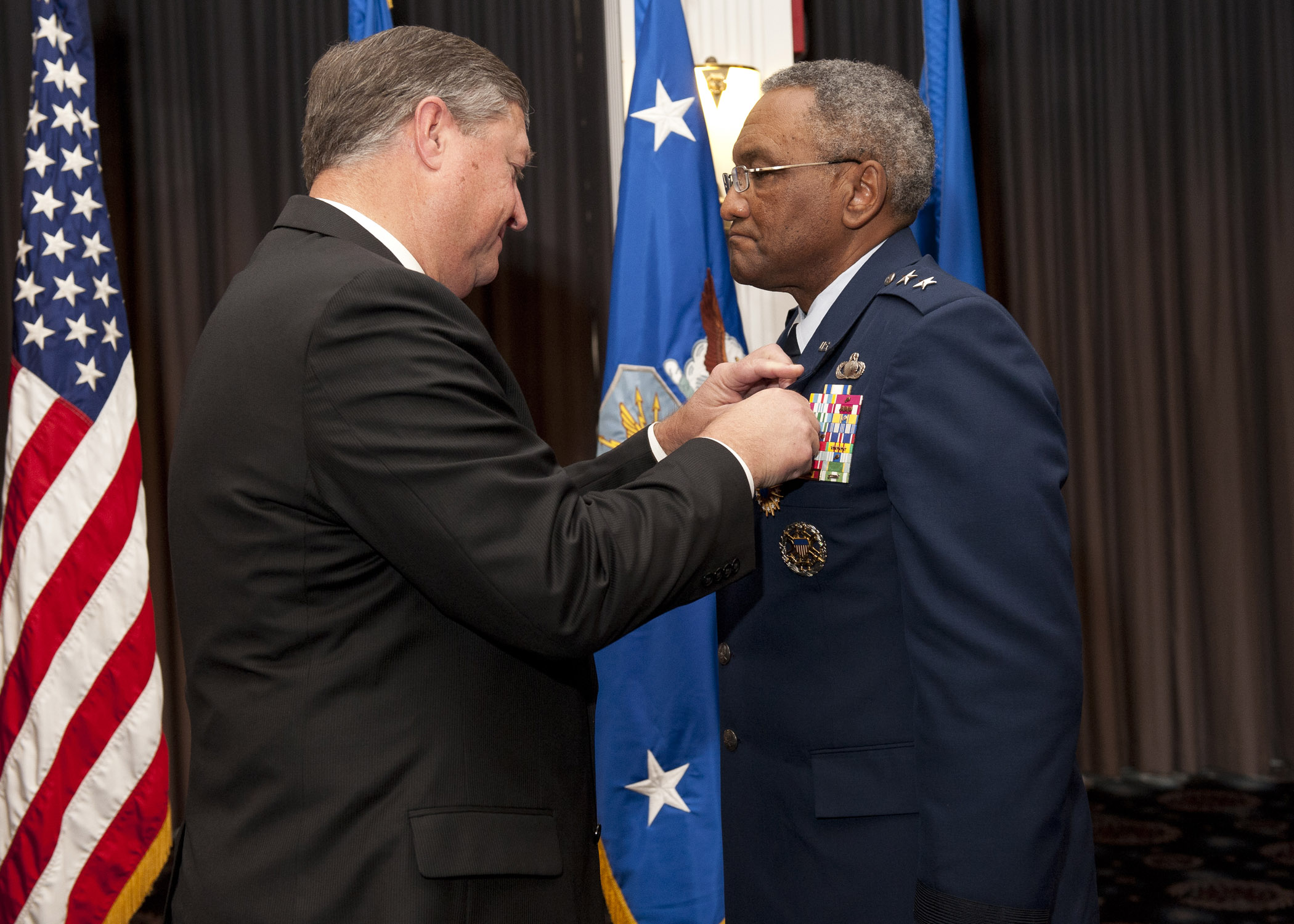
Flowers receiving Air Force Distinguished Service Medal from the Secretary of the Air Force

Flowers took command of the Air Force Officer Accession and Training Schools in January 2007. He served as the organization's commander until May 2008. During that tour, Flowers was promoted to major general. Flowers was then transferred to Keesler Air Force Base, Mississippi where he took command of 2nd Air Force.

In October 2009, Flowers returned to the Pentagon for his final assignment. He served as Deputy Assistant Secretary for Budget until his retirement on 1 January 2012. During this tour, he was responsible for planning and executing a $119 billion annual budget that financed all Air Force operations including support for the wars in Iraq and Afghanistan. Flowers also served on the board of directors for Army and Air Force Exchange Service and the Air Force Aid Society. Prior to his retirement, Flowers was awarded the Order of the Sword, the Air Force enlisted force's highest honor for officer leadership. Several hundred people attend the Order of the Sword ceremony held at the Pentagon's Airman Hall.

At the time of his retirement, Flowers was the longest serving active duty member in Air Force history. He was also the longest serving African American in the history of the United States Department of Defense. His retirement ceremony was held on 16 November 2011 at Bolling Air Force Base in Washington. The Secretary of the Air Force, Michael B. Donley and the Assistant Secretary of the Air Force for Financial Management and Comptroller, Jamie M. Morin both attended his retirement ceremony.

== Retirement ==
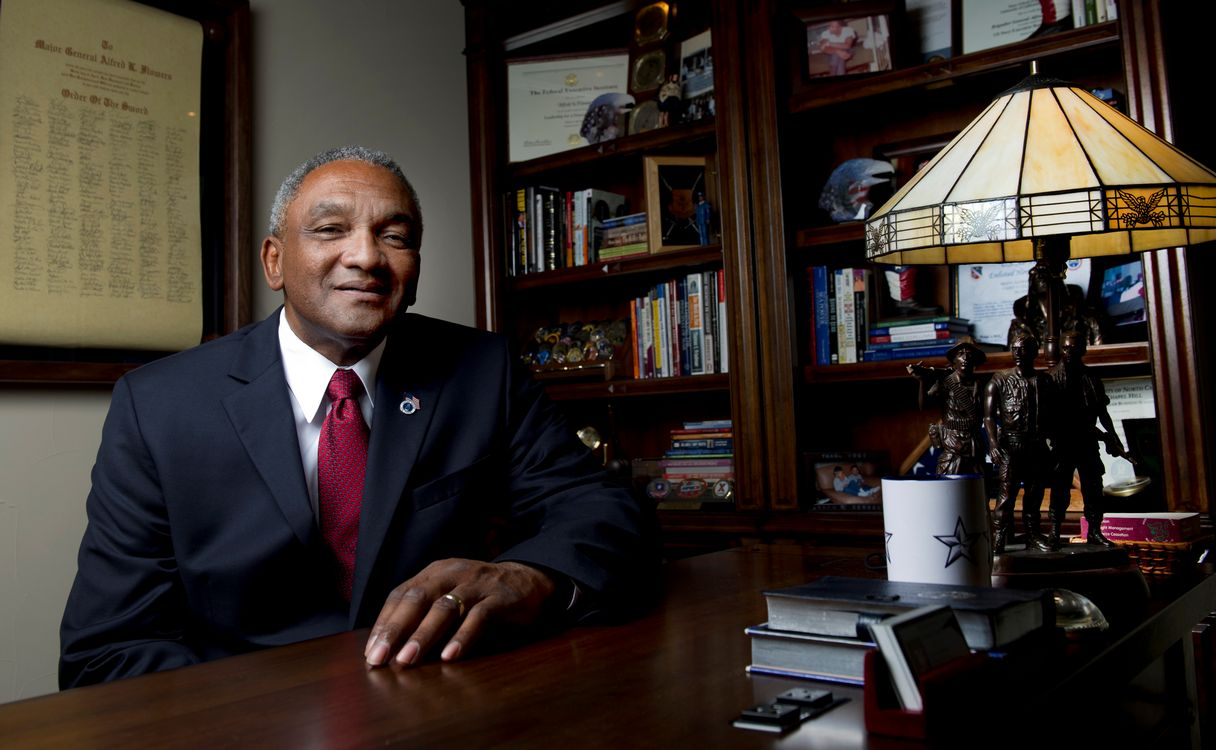
Flowers at his home in San Antonio, Texas, 2012

The effective date of his retirement was 1 January 2012. After retiring from the Air Force, Flowers and his wife moved to San Antonio, where he works with military and veterans groups as a volunteer and a speaker. He also helped develop an enlisted heritage museum. According to Flowers, when he experiences military withdrawal pains, he visits Lackland Air Force Base to watch 700 new airmen march in their basic training graduation parade.

After retiring from active duty, Flowers served on the board of directors for a number of veteran-related organizations. These included Air Force Aid Society, Lackland Fisher Houses, Lackland Heritage Foundation, Endeavors, and the Fallen Warriors Legacy Scholarship Foundation. Flowers also served as a member of the board of director for the Alamo City Chamber of Commerce in San Antonio, Texas.

In 2017, Flowers wrote and published an autobiography entitled Reflections of a Servant Leader. It highlights his life challenges as well as his forty-six years of military service. The book also includes his thoughts on service, integrity, and leadership.

== Awards and decorations ==
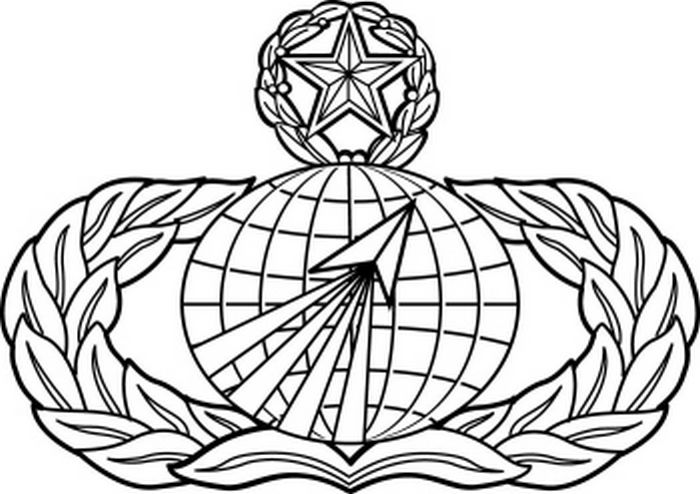
Master Acquisition and Financial Management Badge

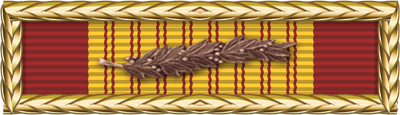
Air Force Distinguished Service Medal
Defense Superior Service Medal
Legion of Merit with bronze oak leaf cluster
Defense Meritorious Service Medal
Meritorious Service Medal with three bronze oak leaf clusters
Joint Service Commendation Medal
Air Force Commendation Medal with silver oak leaf cluster
Joint Service Achievement Medal
Air Force Achievement Medal with bronze oak leaf cluster
Presidential Unit Citation
Air Force Outstanding Unit Award with Valor device and three bronze oak leaf clusters
Air Force Outstanding Unit Award (Second ribbon required due to accouterment spacing)
Air Force Organizational Excellence Award with silver and bronze oak leaf cluster
National Defense Service Medal with two bronze service stars
Vietnam Service Medal with four bronze service stars
Global War on Terrorism Service Medal
Air Force Overseas Short Tour Service Ribbon
Air Force Overseas Long Tour Service Ribbon with bronze oak leaf cluster
Air Force Longevity Service Award with two silver oak leaf clusters
NCO Professional Military Education Graduate Ribbon
Small Arms Expert Marksmanship Ribbon
Air Force Training Ribbon with bronze oak leaf cluster
Vietnam Gallantry Cross Unit Award
Vietnam Campaign Medal

== Effective dates of promotion ==
Promotions
Insignia	Rank	Date
	Major General	November 2, 2007
	Brigadier General	September 1, 2004
	Colonel	August 1, 1998
	Lieutenant Colonel	August 1, 1992
	Major	December 1, 1988
	Captain	December 1, 1982
	First Lieutenant	December 11, 1980
	Second Lieutenant	December 11, 1978
