= Regis F. A. Urschler =

United States Air Force general (born 1935)

Brigadier General Regis F. A. Urschler
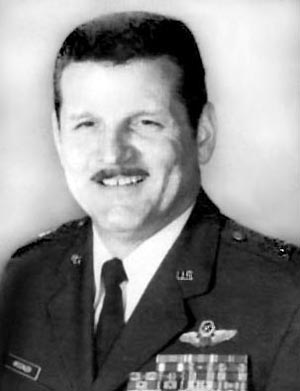
- Regis F. A. Urschler
- Born: Regis F. A. Urschler; April 23, 1935 (age 91); Pittsburgh, PA
- Allegiance: United States
- Branch: United States Air Force
- Service years: 1953–1985
- Rank: Brigadier General
- Commands: 55th Strategic Reconnaissance Wing; Electronic Security Command
- Wars/Actions: Vietnam War; Cold War
- Awards: AF Distinguished Service Medal; Legion of Merit; Distinguished Flying Cross; Bronze Star Medal; Meritorious Service Medal; Air Medal (18 OLC); AF Commendation Medal (3 OLC)

Regis F. A. Urschler (born 23 April 1935) is a retired United States Air Force brigadier general who served as the vice commander of Electronic Security Command (ESC). ESC was formed in 1979, and Urschler became vice commander in May 1982. He retired from active duty 1 June 1985 a decorated Vietnam War and Cold War command pilot with more than 15,000 flying hours, including 1,500-plus in combat. His overseas tours of duty included Japan, Turkey, Greenland and England.

== Early life ==
Urschler, born 23 April 1935, is the son of Austrian immigrant parents, raised in an immigrant community in Pittsburgh, Pennsylvania. After graduation from North Catholic High School in Troyhill in 1953, He enlisted in the Air Force entering pilot training at 19.

== Military career ==
Urschler was a command pilot who spent 28 years of his 32-year career with Strategic Air Command. He earned his Bachelor of Arts degree in business economics from Park College, Parkville, Missouri, in 1973. He completed Squadron Officer School, Air Command and Staff College and the Industrial College of the Armed Forces. During the Cold War, he flew reconnaissance missions in the skies over the Soviet Union, China and North Korea.

=== Assignments ===
1. Enlisted, then completed Air Force Basic Military Training at Sampson Air Force Base, Geneva, NY.
2. His initial assignment was Reese AFB, Lubbock, TX.
3. April 1954, he entered Primary Flight Training as an Aviation Cadet at Hondo Air Base, TX, and later, Basic Flight Training at Vance AFB, Enid, OK.
4. August 1955, commissioned a Second Lieutenant and received his Pilot Wings.
5. Next (date unknown, probably 1955), he was assigned to the 343d Strategic Reconnaissance Squadron, 55th Strategic Reconnaissance Wing, Forbes AFB, Topeka, KS as Aircraft Commander in RB-47E's, H's and K's and the EB and ERB-47s. While assigned to this unit, his flying duties included numerous tours of duty in Japan, Turkey, Greenland, England and Alaska.
6. December 1964, assigned to KC-135 transition training at Castle AFB, CA.
7. April 1965, assigned to the 4157th Strategic Wing at Eielson AFB, Fairbanks, AK as Aircraft Commander and Instructor Pilot in RC-135D, E and S Models. He often flew the RC-135E and S from Shemya Air Force Station, in the Aleutian Islands.
8. May 1967, assigned to 343d SRS again, now located at Offutt AFB, NE as Crew Commander and Instructor Pilot in RC-135C and RC-135T models.
9. July 1970, assigned to the 82d Strategic Reconnaissance Squadron, 376th Strategic Wing, Kadena AB, Okinawa, Japan as Squadron Operations Officer (and commander from 1971 to 1973) concurrently performing as Instructor Pilot in RC-135M's while flying missions in support of the Vietnam War.
10. May 1973, assigned to Offutt AFB again and entered the Bootstrap program at Park College, graduating in December 1973.
11. December 1973, assigned to Offutt AFB, Headquarters Strategic Air Command, as Senior Controller, Director of Command and Control.
12. August 1975, assigned to the 301st Air Refueling Wing, Rickenbacker AFB, Columbus, OH as Vice Commander, assuming command July 1977.
13. May 1978, assigned back to 55th Strategic Reconnaissance Wing, Offutt AFB as Wing Commander.
14. August 1980, assigned to 47th Air Division, Fairchild AFB, Spokane, WA as Air Division Commander.
15. May 1982, final assignment, Electronic Security Command, Kelly AFB, San Antonio, TX as Vice Commander.
16. 1 June 1985, retired.

Promotions
Insignia	Rank	Date
	Brigadier General	May 31, 1980
	Second Lieutenant	August 1955

=== Awards and decorations ===
Brigadier General Regis Urschler was awarded the Order of the Sword on May 1, 1985.

General Urschler has been awarded the following awards and decorations:

Decorations	Badges
Air Force Distinguished Service Medal	Air Force Command Pilot Badge
Legion of Merit	Air Force Command Pilot Badge
Distinguished Flying Cross	Air Force Command Pilot Badge
Bronze Star Medal	Air Force Command Pilot Badge
Meritorious Service Medal	Air Force Command Pilot Badge
Air Medal (18 OLC)	Air Force Command Pilot Badge
Air Force Commendation Medal (3 OLC)	Air Force Command Pilot Badge

=== Memberships ===
- Honorary member of the Tuskegee Airmen
- Life member of the Air Force Association, Order of Daedalians, Veterans of Foreign Wars, 8th Air Force Historical Society, Mighty 8th Air Force Heritage Center, 55th Fighter Group Association, Commemorative Air Force, Experimental Aircraft Association
- Member of the Air Force Museum Foundation
- Founding member of the American Air Museum in Britain

== Personal life and retirement ==
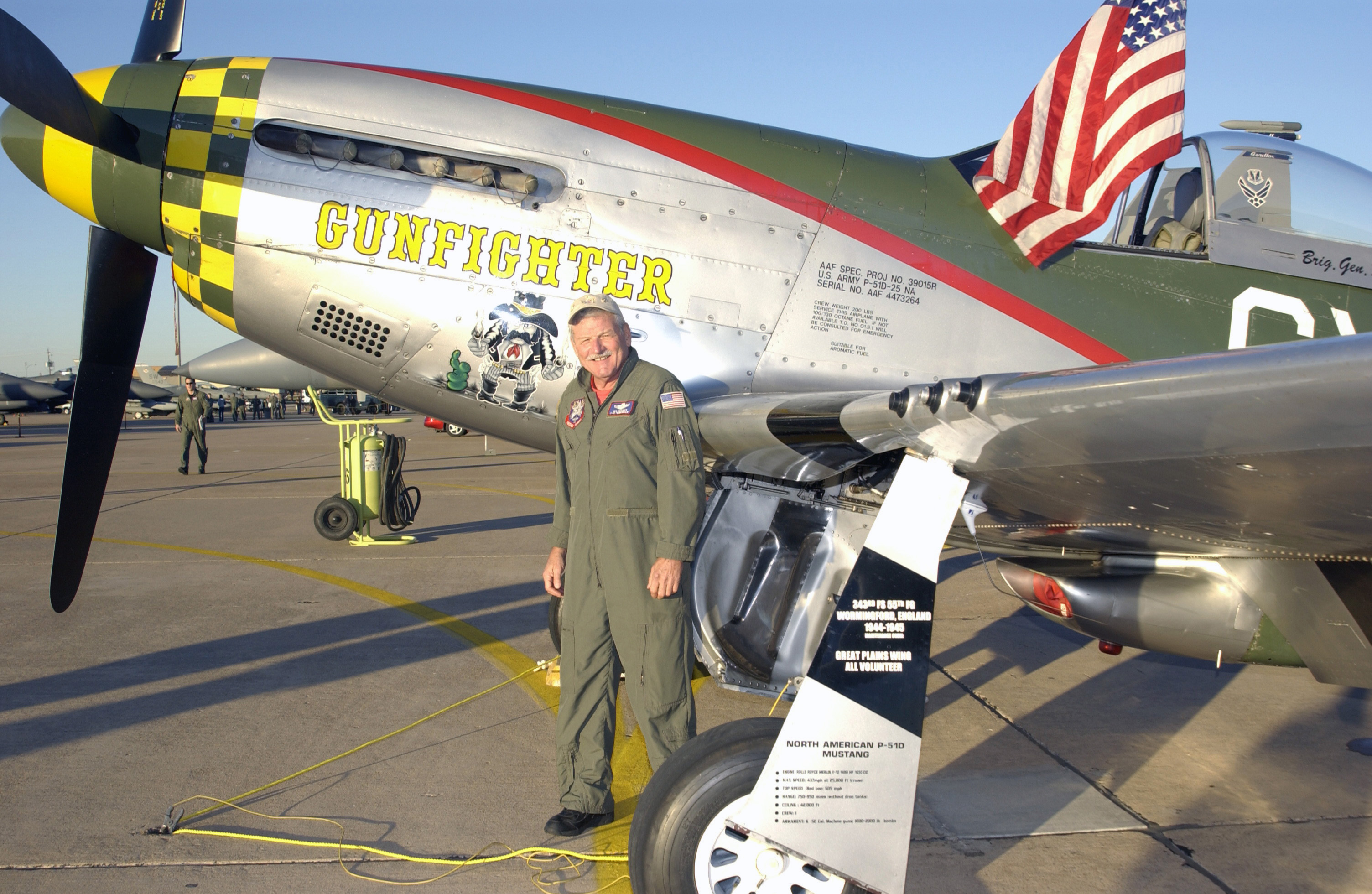
Regis Urschler in retirement with P-51 "Gunfighter"

Regis Urschler never married. After a 32-year military career, he retired from the Air Force on June 1, 1985. He underwent five-way bypass heart surgery in 2001, and returned to flying the Commemorative Air Force's P-51 aircraft named "Gunfighter" for several years. In retirement alone, Urschler has logged more than 3,000 hours at air shows in the same P-51 Mustang. After turning 80 years old in 2015, he no longer flies. He enjoys gardening and nature.

== See also ==
Order of the Sword – Recipients List
