= John F. Gonge =

United States Air Force general

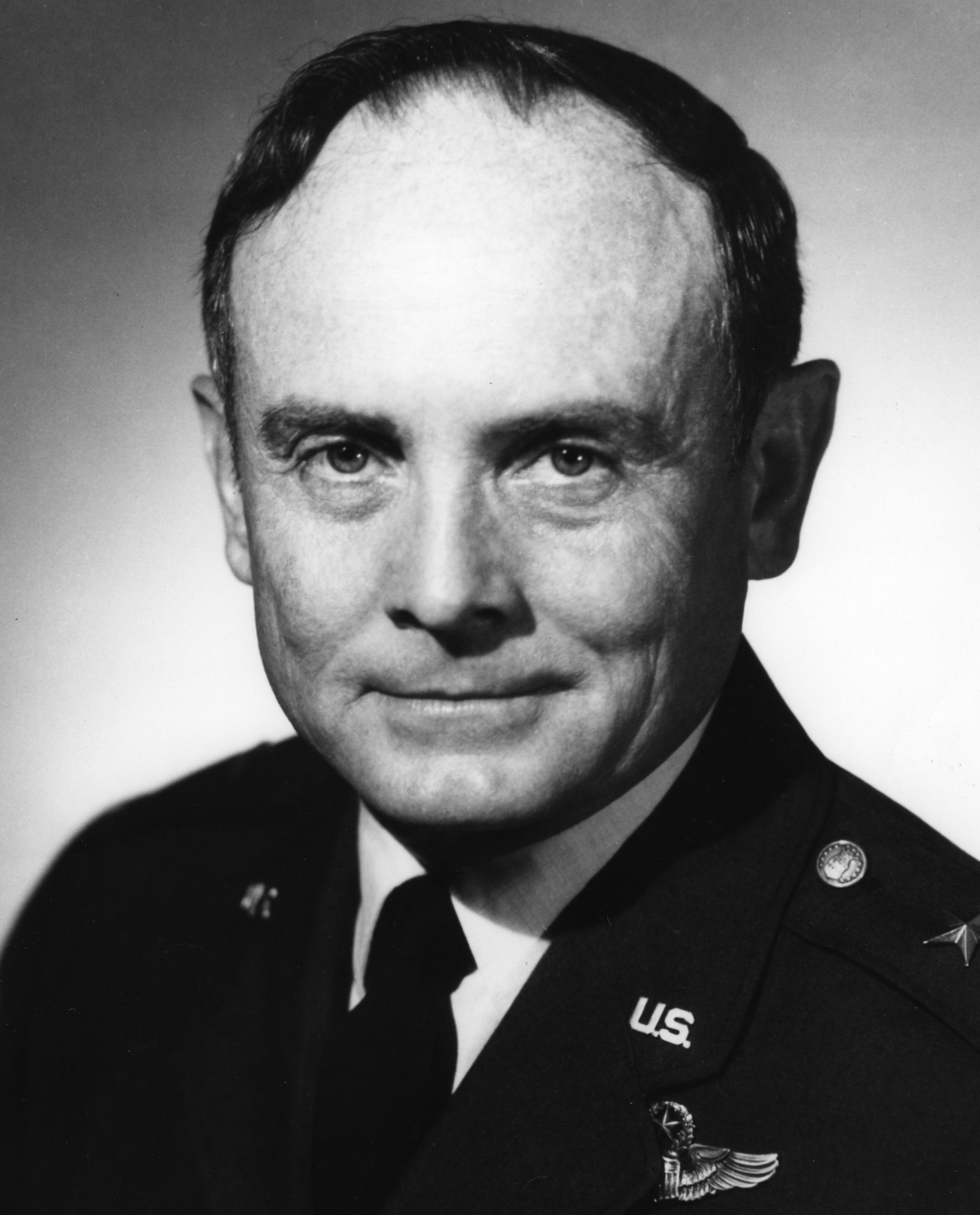
- Born: November 5, 1921 (age 104); Ansley, Nebraska, U.S.
- Military career
- Allegiance: United States
- Branch: United States Air Force
- Service years: 1943–1977
- Rank: Lieutenant general
- Commands: 1506th Support Squadron; 60th Military Airlift Wing; 63d Military Airlift Wing; 21st Air Force; 22d Air Force; Military Airlift Command
- Conflicts: World War II
- Awards: Air Force Distinguished Service Medal; Legion of Merit; Distinguished Flying Cross; Meritorious Service Medal; Air Medal; Order of the Sword

John F. Gonge (born November 5, 1921) is a former lieutenant general in the United States Air Force. He was served as vice commander-in-chief of the Military Airlift Command from 1975 to 1977.

== Biography ==
General Gonge was born in 1921, in Ansley, Nebraska, where he graduated from Ansley High School in 1938. He entered active military service as an aviation cadet and attended the U.S. Army Air Corps Flying School at Lubbock Army Air Field, Texas, where he received his pilot wings and commission as a second lieutenant in December 1943. He completed his multiengine training in March 1944.

During World War II, he flew the "Hump" in the China-Burma-India campaigns with the Army Air Corps Air Transport Command. In September 1946, he was assigned to the 47th Bombardment Group at Lake Charles Army Air Field, Louisiana, and transferred with the 47th Group to Biggs Field, Texas.

A career transport pilot, General Gonge has remained with airlift forces through Air Training Command, Military Air Transport Service, and Military Airlift Command. He became a ferry pilot in June 1947 and later was aide-de-camp to the Commander of the San Antonio Air Materiel Area at Kelly Air Force Base, Texas. In October 1948, he was transferred to the Flying Division, Air Training Command, and later became protocol officer for the 3510th Basic Pilot Training Wing, both at Randolph Air Force Base, Texas. He returned to Kelly Air Force Base in February 1950 as aide to the commander, Continental Division, Military Air Transport Service.

In May 1953, General Gonge went to Hickam Air Force Base, Hawaii, where he was assigned as special projects officer in the Office of the Deputy Chief of Staff for operations, Pacific Division, MATS, and later as administrative assistant to the commander. He moved with the division to Parks Air Force Base, California, in November 1956. He was sent to Clark Air Base, Philippine Islands, in July 1958, and was assigned as commander of the 1506th Support Squadron.

In July 1960, he was transferred to Headquarters Western Transport Air Force (redesignated 22d Air Force) at Travis Air Force Base, California, where he served first as chief, Program Division and later as assistant deputy chief of staff for plans and manpower. In July 1963, General Gonge was transferred to Scott Air Force Base, Illinois, and became deputy assistant chief of staff, Military Air Transport Service.

He attended the National War College, Washington, D.C., from August 1965 to June 1966. He next was assigned to the Organization of the Joint Chiefs of Staff, as chief, Resources Capability Branch, Office of the Special Assistant for Strategic Mobility; then as chief of the Short and Mid-Range Branch; and later as chief of the Policy Branch, Plans Division.

In July 1969, he returned to Travis Air Force Base as vice commander of the 60th Military Airlift Wing. He was assigned as commander of the 63d Military Airlift Wing at Norton Air Force Base, California, in February 1970. General Gonge became vice commander of the 21st Air Force, McGuire Air Force Base, New Jersey, in March 1971. He commanded the 22d Air Force at Travis Air Force Base from August 1972 to August 1975, when he became vice commander of the Military Airlift Command. On Feb. 1, 1977, when MAC was designated as a specified command, General Gonge's position title was changed to vice commander in chief, MAC. General Gonge retired in 1977.

He is a command pilot with more than 13,000 flying hours. His military decorations and awards include the Air Force Distinguished Service Medal, Legion of Merit, Distinguished Flying Cross, Meritorious Service Medal, Air Medal, Air Force Commendation Medal with oak leaf cluster, Army Commendation Medal, and the Distinguished Unit Citation Emblem.

He turned 100 in November 2021.
