= Stephen R. Lorenz =

United States Air Force general

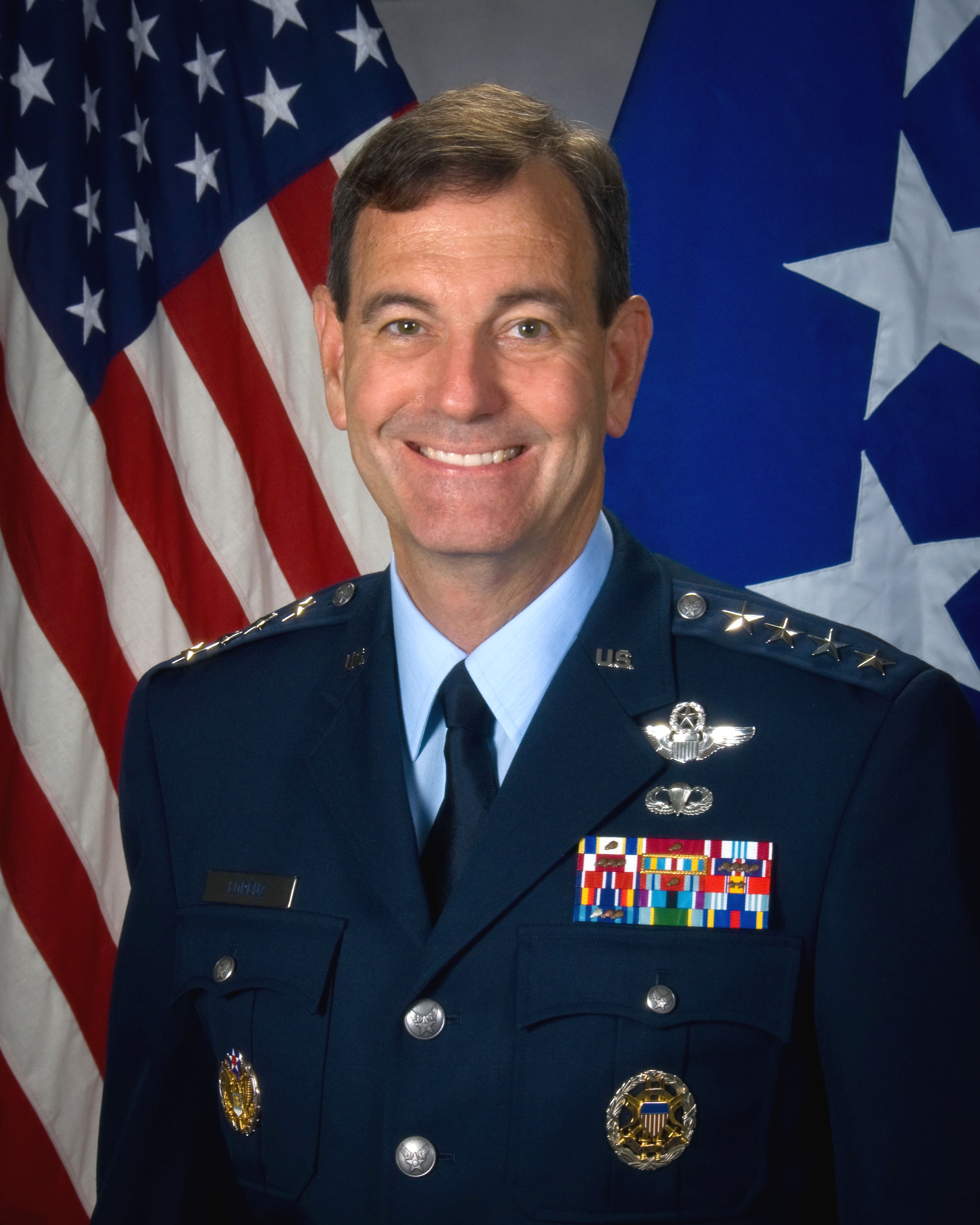
- General Stephen Lorenz, USAF
- Born: October 17, 1951 (age 74); Houston, Texas, U.S.
- Military career
- Allegiance: United States of America
- Branch: United States Air Force
- Service years: 1973 - 2010
- Rank: General
- Commands: Air Education and Training Command 93d Air Refueling Squadron; 398th Operations Group; 22d Air Refueling Wing; 722d Air Refueling Wing; 305th Air Mobility Wing; 34th Training Wing Air University; Air Education and Training Command
- Awards: Air Force Distinguished Service Medal (4); Legion of Merit (2); Defense Meritorious Service Medal; Meritorious Service Medal (4); Order of the Sword

Stephen Randolph Lorenz (born October 17, 1951), is a retired United States Air Force four-star general who currently serves as president and chief executive officer of the United States Air Force Academy Endowment. His last military assignment was as the 29th Commander, Air Education and Training Command (AETC), Randolph Air Force Base, Texas. As commander, he was responsible for the recruiting, training and education of all US Airmen. His command included the Air Force Recruiting Service, two numbered air forces and Air University. Air Education and Training Command consists of 13 bases, more than 92,000 active duty, reserve, guard, civilians and contractors, and 1,750 trainer, fighter and mobility aircraft.

The general entered the Air Force in 1973 following graduation from the United States Air Force Academy and attended undergraduate pilot training at Craig Air Force Base, Alabama. He is a command pilot with 3,600 hours in ten aircraft. He has commanded an air refueling squadron, a geographically separated operations group, an air refueling wing that won the 1994 Riverside Trophy for Best Wing in the 15th Air Force, and an air mobility wing that won the 1995 Armstrong Trophy for Best Wing in the 21st Air Force. He also commanded the training wing at the academy where he served as the Commandant of Cadets.

On July 16, 2010, he was awarded the Order of the Sword by the airmen of the Air Education and Training Command. General Lorenz was succeeded by General Edward A. Rice Jr. on November 17, 2010, and retired from the Air Force on January 1, 2011.

== Education ==
- 1973 Bachelor of Science degree in international affairs, United States Air Force Academy, Colorado Springs, Colorado
- 1977 Master's degree in public administration, University of Northern Colorado
- 1979 Squadron Officer School, Maxwell AFB, Alabama
- 1983 Air Command and Staff College, by seminar
- 1986 Air War College, by seminar
- 1990 National War College, Fort Lesley J. McNair, Washington, D.C.
- 1995 Advanced Management Program, Pennsylvania State University
- 1997 Center for Creative Leadership, Colorado Springs, Colorado
- 1999 Executive Program for Russian and American General Officers, John F. Kennedy School of Government, Harvard University, Cambridge, Massachusetts
- 2000 Joint Flag Officer Warfighting Course, Maxwell AFB, Alabama
- 2000 Senior Information Warfare Application Course, Maxwell AFB, Alabama
- 2000 Senior Executive Course in Crisis Management, George C. Marshall College of International and Security Studies, Garmisch, Germany
- 2001 National Security Leadership Course, Syracuse University, New York
- 2004 Combined Force Air Component Commander Course, Maxwell AFB, Alabama
- 2004 Pinnacle, Joint Task Force Commander Course, National Defense University, Fort Lesley J. McNair, Washington, D.C.

== Assignments ==
- August 1973 - October 1974, student, undergraduate pilot training, Craig AFB, Alabama
- October 1974 - March 1975, student, KC-135 training, Castle AFB, California
- March 1975 - January 1980, EC-135 co-pilot and aircraft commander, 4th Airborne Command and Control Squadron, Ellsworth AFB, South Dakota
- January 1980 - April 1982, T-39 pilot and aide to the Commander, Air Force Logistics Command, Wright-Patterson AFB, Ohio
- April 1982 - February 1983, Congressional Liaison Officer, Inquiries Division, Office of Legislative Liaison, the Pentagon, Washington, D.C.
- February 1983 - August 1983, executive officer to the Director of Legislative Liaison, Office of the Secretary of the Air Force for Legislative Liaison, the Pentagon, Washington, D.C.
- August 1983 - March 1986, Deputy Chief, Senate Liaison Office, Capitol Hill, Washington, D.C.
- March 1986 - July 1987, KC-135 instructor pilot and flight commander, 924th Air Refueling Squadron, Castle AFB, California
- July 1987 - August 1989, Commander, 93d Air Refueling Squadron, Castle AFB, California.
- August 1989 - June 1990, student, National War College, Fort Lesley J. McNair, Washington, D.C.
- June 1990 - March 1991, Chief, Northeast Asia Branch, and Japan desk officer, Far East/South Asia Division, Directorate of Strategic Plans and Policy, the Joint Staff, Washington, D.C.
- March 1991 - June 1992, Chief, European and North Atlantic Treaty Organization Policy Branch, Directorate of Strategic Plans and Policy - European Division, the Pentagon, Washington, D.C.
- June 1992 - July 1993, commander of 398th Operations Group, Castle AFB, California.
- July 1993 - January 1994, commander of 22d Air Refueling Wing, March AFB, California.
- January 1994 - December 1994, commander of 722d Air Refueling Wing, March AFB, California.
- December 1994 - August 1996, commander of 305th Air Mobility Wing, McGuire AFB, New Jersey.
- August 1996 - June 1999, Commandant of Cadets and commander of 34th Training Wing, U.S. Air Force Academy, Colorado Springs, Colorado
- July 1999 - September 2001, director of plans and programs, Headquarters U.S. Air Forces in Europe, Ramstein Air Base, Germany
- September 2001 - October 2005, Deputy Assistant Secretary for Budget, Office of the Assistant Secretary of the Air Force for Financial Management and Comptroller, Headquarters U.S. Air Force, Washington, D.C.
- October 2005 – July 2008, Commander, Air University, Maxwell AFB, Alabama.
- July 2008 – November 2010, Commander, Air Education and Training Command, Randolph AFB, Texas.
- November 2010 - Retired (Effective January 1, 2011)

== Flight Information ==
- Rating: Command pilot, parachutist
- Flight hours: 3,600 hours
- Aircraft flown: EC-135A/G/C, KC-10A, KC-135A, C-141B, KC-135R, T-38, T-39, T-1, UV-18 and C-182

== Awards and decorations ==
US Air Force Command Pilot Badge
Basic Parachutist Badge
Office of the Joint Chiefs of Staff Identification Badge
Headquarters Air Force Badge

Air Force Distinguished Service Medal with three bronze oak leaf clusters
Legion of Merit with oak leaf cluster
Defense Meritorious Service Medal
Meritorious Service Medal with three oak leaf clusters
Joint Meritorious Unit Award
Outstanding Unit Award with four oak leaf clusters
Organizational Excellence Award
Combat Readiness Medal with oak leaf cluster
National Defense Service Medal with two bronze service stars
Global War on Terrorism Service Medal
Humanitarian Service Medal
Air Force Overseas Long Tour Service Ribbon
Air Force Longevity Service Award with one silver and three bronze oak leaf clusters
Small Arms Expert Marksmanship Ribbon
Air Force Training Ribbon

== Publications ==
- Co-author, "Linking Resource Allocation to Performance Management and Strategic Planning--an Air Force Challenge," Aerospace Power Journal, Winter 2001
- "Lorenz on Leadership," Air & Space Power Journal, Summer 2005
- "Transforming Air Force Education for the Long War and Beyond," Air and Space Power Journal, Summer 2007
- "Lorenz on Leadership II," Air & Space Power Journal, Spring 2008
- "Lorenz on Leadership III," Air & Space Power Journal, Fall 2010

== Promotion Dates ==
- Second Lieutenant June 6, 1973
- First Lieutenant June 6, 1975
- Captain June 6, 1977
- Major November 1, 1982
- Lieutenant Colonel March 1, 1985
- Colonel February 1, 1991
- Brigadier General October 1, 1996
- Major General January 1, 2000
- Lieutenant General November 1, 2005
- General July 2, 2008
