= Walter D. Druen Jr. =

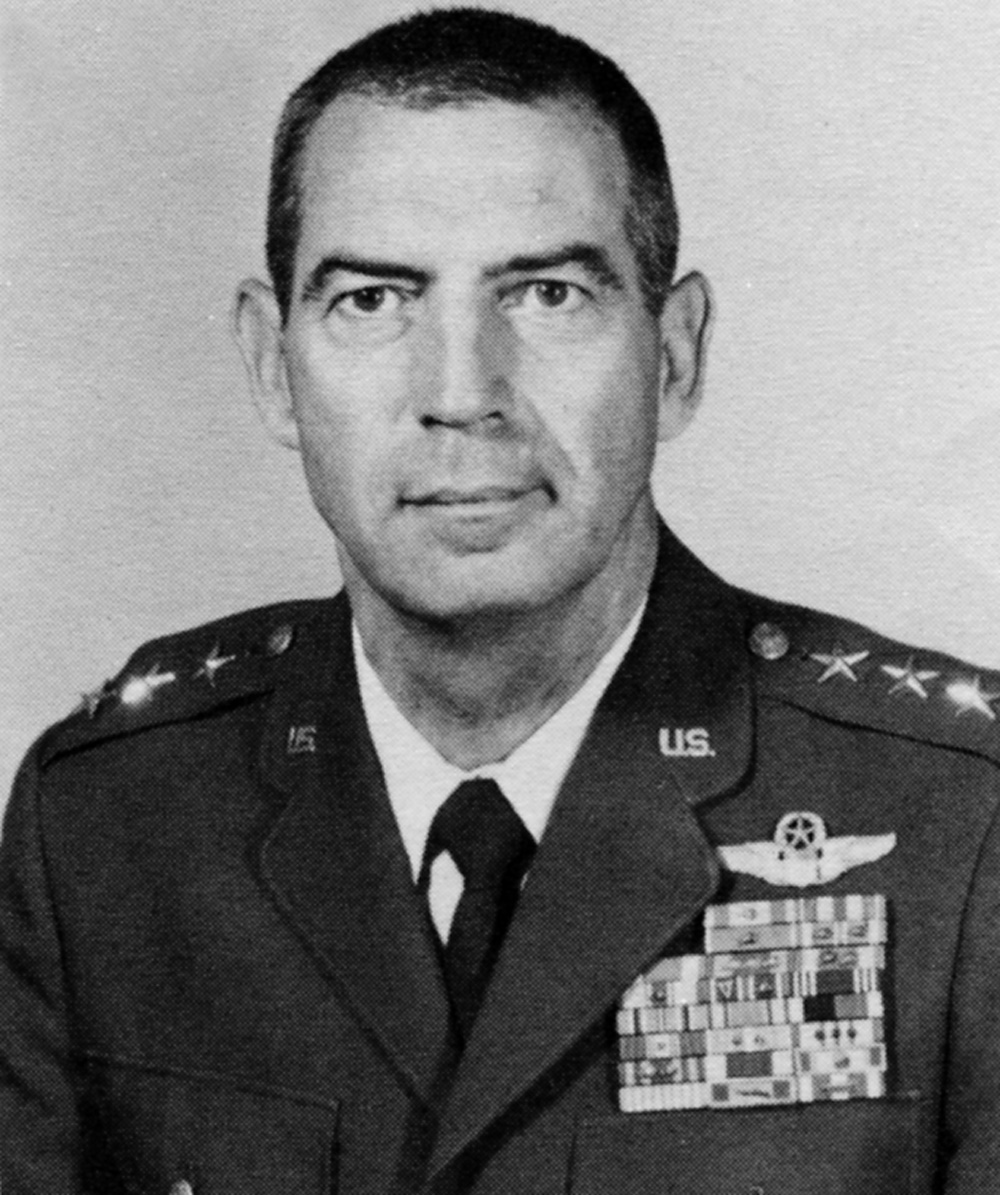
- Born: January 24, 1927 (age 99); Lynchburg, Virginia, U.S.
- Military career
- Allegiance: United States of America
- Branch: United States Air Force
- Service years: 1944–1982
- Rank: Lieutenant General
- Awards: Order of the Sword, Distinguished Service Medal with oak leaf cluster, Silver Star, Legion of Merit with oak leaf cluster, Distinguished Flying Cross with two oak leaf clusters, Meritorious Service Medal, Air Medal with 14 oak leaf clusters, Air Force Commendation Medal with oak leaf cluster

Walter Daniel Druen Jr. (born January 24, 1927) is a retired lieutenant general in the United States Air Force who served as commander of Allied Air Forces Southern Europe and deputy commander in chief, U.S. Air Forces in Europe (USAFE), Southern Area, with headquarters at Naples, Italy from July 1981 until his retirement in 1982.

Druen was born and raised in Lynchburg, Virginia. He began his military career in February 1944 as a private in the U.S. Army Air Corps and was released from military service in January 1947. He then attended the Virginia Polytechnic Institute, Blacksburg.

He returned to active duty and entered the aviation cadet program in November 1950. He received his pilot wings and commission as a second lieutenant at Craig Air Force Base, Ala., in December 1951. Following graduation he attended advanced jet fighter training at Nellis Air Force Base, Nevada, and was assigned to South Korea where he served with the 335th Fighter-Interceptor Squadron, 4th Tactical Fighter Group. During this tour of duty, he flew 100 combat missions in F-86s.

Since then Druen had served almost entirely in tactical fighters, having been stationed at the Air Force Fighter Weapons School, Nellis Air Force Base; the 510th Tactical Fighter Squadron at Clark Air Base, Philippines; and Luke Air Force Base, Arizona. From Luke AFB, Druen attended the Armed Forces Staff College at Norfolk, Va., and then had a tour of duty in the Plans and Operations Directorate at Headquarters U.S. Air Force, Washington, D.C. He attended the Industrial College of the Armed Forces at Fort Lesley J. McNair, Washington, D.C., and after graduation in June 1968, was assigned to George Air Force Base, Calif. In August 1969 he was assigned as director of operations for the 8th Tactical Fighter Wing at Ubon Royal Thai Air Force Base, Thailand, where he logged 173 combat missions in F-4s.

Druen has commanded two tactical fighter wings, the 23rd at McConnell Air Force Base, Kan., and the 1st at MacDill Air Force Base, Fla. He was assigned as chief, Air Section, Military Assistance Advisory Group, Iran, for two years prior to his appointment as deputy commander and later commander of the Air Force Military Personnel Center at Randolph Air Force Base, Texas. Druen commanded 17th Air Force at Sembach Air Base, Germany. In August 1980 he transferred to Naples and took command of Allied Air Forces Southern Europe and 16th Air Force.

Druen has flown more than 5,000 hours in virtually all types of tactical aircraft, including F-4s, F-5s, F-15s, F-80s, F-86s, F-100s, F-104s, F-105s and A-10s. His military decorations and awards include the Distinguished Service Medal with oak leaf cluster, Silver Star, Legion of Merit with oak leaf cluster, Distinguished Flying Cross with two oak leaf clusters, Meritorious Service Medal, Air Medal with 14 oak leaf clusters and Air Force Commendation Medal with oak leaf cluster.

He was promoted to lieutenant general August 1, 1980, with date of rank July 31, 1980. He retired on August 1, 1982.

General Druen resides in Las Vegas, Nevada.
