= Norma Elaine Brown =

United States Air Force general

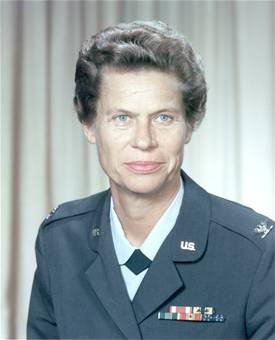
- Born: February 11, 1926; Madison, Florida, U.S.
- Died: July 22, 2003 (aged 77); Cheyenne, Wyoming, U.S.
- Military career
- Allegiance: United States of America
- Branch: United States Air Force
- Service years: 1951–1982
- Rank: Major general
- Commands: Chanute Technical Training Center
- Conflicts: Korean War; Vietnam War
- Awards: Distinguished Service Medal; Legion of Merit; Meritorious Service Medal; Order of the Sword

Norma Elaine Brown (February 11, 1926 – July 22, 2003) was an American U.S. Air Force major general. Her last post in the Air Force was as the commander of the Chanute Technical Training Center in Rantoul, Illinois. After her retirement from the military, she served on the board of directors of GEICO until 1994.

== Education ==
Brown received a bachelor's degree in physical education from Florida State University in 1949.

== Career ==
After graduation from Florida State University in 1949, General Brown taught physical education in middle school and high school for two years in Lake City, Florida.

=== Military service ===
She entered the Air Force in December 1951 when a force buildup was in effect for the Korean War. At that time she was one of approximately 13,000 women in the Air Force. In the following years she served as a personnel officer and WAF squadron commander at a variety of bases in Washington, D.C.; San Antonio, Texas; England, Taiwan and Newfoundland. In 1972, after promotion to colonel, she became commander of the 6970th Air Base Group at Fort George G. Meade, Maryland, and in 1974 she became the first woman wing commander when she assumed command of the 6940th Security Wing at Goodfellow AFB, San Angelo, Texas. In 1977 she was promoted to brigadier general and assigned as the deputy chief of staff for personnel and manpower, Air Force Logistics Command, Wright-Patterson AFB, Ohio. Two years later, after promotion to major general, she assumed command of Chanute Technical Training Center, Rantoul, Illinois. She retired in August 1982 after 32 years service.

== Awards and recognitions ==
Her military decorations include the Distinguished Service Medal, the Legion of Merit and the Meritorious Service Medal. Additionally in 1982 she received the Order of the Sword from the enlisted members of Air Training Command in recognition of her dedicated support of the enlisted force. Also, the USAF Security Service Alumni Association elected her to their Hall of Honor in 1993.

She was selected a member of the San Antonio Women's Hall of Fame in 1986, and she was named a Florida State University "Grad Done Good" in 1980. She holds an honorary degree in philosophy from MacMurray College, Jacksonville, Illinois. After retirement from the Air Force, General Brown served on the Board of Directors of Government Employees Insurance Company (GEICO) until retirement in 1994.

Prior to the Chanute Technical Training Center she was promoted to be the commander of the Air Base Group at the National Security Agency, Ft. Meade, Maryland, the first woman to ever command a group that size. She also served as the Deputy Chief of Staff for the Air Force Logistics Command at the Wright-Patterson AFB. Norma Elaine Brown is known for being the first female to command a USAF wing (6940th Security Wing at Goodfellow AFB, Texas, 1974) in the history of the U.S. Air Force. She was awarded the Air Force's Order of the Sword in 1982.
