= Thomas A. Aldrich =

United States Air Force general (1923–2019)

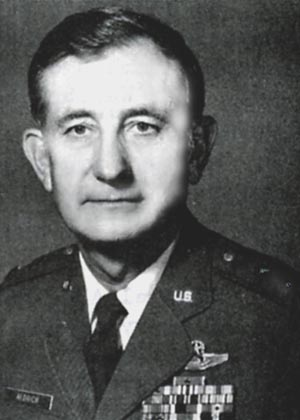
- Born: November 30, 1923; Rosebud, Texas, U.S.
- Died: September 13, 2019 (aged 95); Roseville, California, U.S.
- Military career
- Allegiance: United States of America
- Branch: United States Air Force
- Service years: 1942–1978
- Rank: Major general
- Awards: Order of the Sword, Legion of Merit with oak leaf cluster, Meritorious Service Medal with oak leaf cluster, Joint Service Commendation Medal, Air Force Commendation Medal, Army Commendation Medal, Distinguished Unit Citation, Medal of Military Merit of First Class (from the Government of the Portuguese Republic)

Thomas Albert Aldrich (November 30, 1923 – September 13, 2019) was a major general in the United States Air Force who served as commander, Twenty-Second Air Force, Military Airlift Command, with headquarters at Travis Air Force Base, California.

== Biography ==
Born in 1923, Aldrich was a native of San Angelo, Texas. He has a bachelor's degree in mathematics and a master's degree in business administration from The George Washington University. He enlisted in the Army Air Forces in December 1942 and, after completing the aviation cadet meteorology course at the University of Chicago, was commissioned as a second lieutenant in February 1944. He served as corps commander of his cadet class.

Aldrich served in a variety of weather-related duties in the United States and the Pacific theater prior to entering pilot training in April 1949. He completed pilot training in March 1950 at Vance Air Force Base, Oklahoma. From 1950 to 1954, he served as aircraft commander and flight operations officer at squadron level in the continental United States. He joined Headquarters Air Weather Service, Andrews Air Force Base, Maryland, in March 1955 as chief, Programs and Standards Branch, Office of the Deputy Chief of Staff for Operations. In August 1957 Aldrich was named deputy director for air operations and went with the headquarters when it moved to Scott Air Force Base, Illinois. In August 1960 he entered the Air War College at Maxwell Air Force Base, Alabama.

Aldrich was reassigned overseas in September 1962 as commander of the 57th Weather Reconnaissance Squadron, then based at Avalon Airfield, Victoria, Australia, making him the only U.S. Air Force base commander in Australia, and the only base commander in the Air Weather Service. He returned to the United States in September 1965 and was again assigned to Maxwell Air Force Base, where he served on the staff of the Air Command and Staff College as chief of the Military Employment Division and deputy director of Curriculum. In July 1968 he started a one-year tour as director of war plans, Military Airlift Command, Scott Air Force Base, Illinois.

Aldrich was named vice commander of the 9th Weather Reconnaissance Wing at McClellan Air Force Base, California, in July 1969 and, in November, assumed command of that organization. In July 1970 Aldrich was named vice commander of the Air Weather Service and again returned to Scott Air Force Base. In June 1971 he became commander of United States Forces, Azores, and commander of the 1605th Air Base Wing, Lajes Field, Azores. Aldrich assumed command of the Air Weather Service at Scott Air Force Base in July 1973. Air Weather Service is a technical service of the Military Airlift Command. Aldrich began duties as deputy chief of staff for plans, Military Airlift Command, at Scott Air Force Base, in February 1974. He served in that position until August 1975, when he assumed command of the Twenty-second Air Force.

Aldrich is a command pilot with more than 8,000 hours of flying. His military awards and decorations include the Legion of Merit with oak leaf cluster, Meritorious Service Medal with oak leaf cluster, Joint Service Commendation Medal, Air Force Commendation Medal, Army Commendation Medal, Distinguished Unit Citation, and the Medal of Military Merit of First Class (from the Government of the Portuguese Republic). Aldrich was promoted to the grade of major general April 24, 1974, with date of rank July 1, 1971. He retired on April 1, 1978. He died on September 13, 2019, aged 95.
