= Roger P. Scheer =

American general

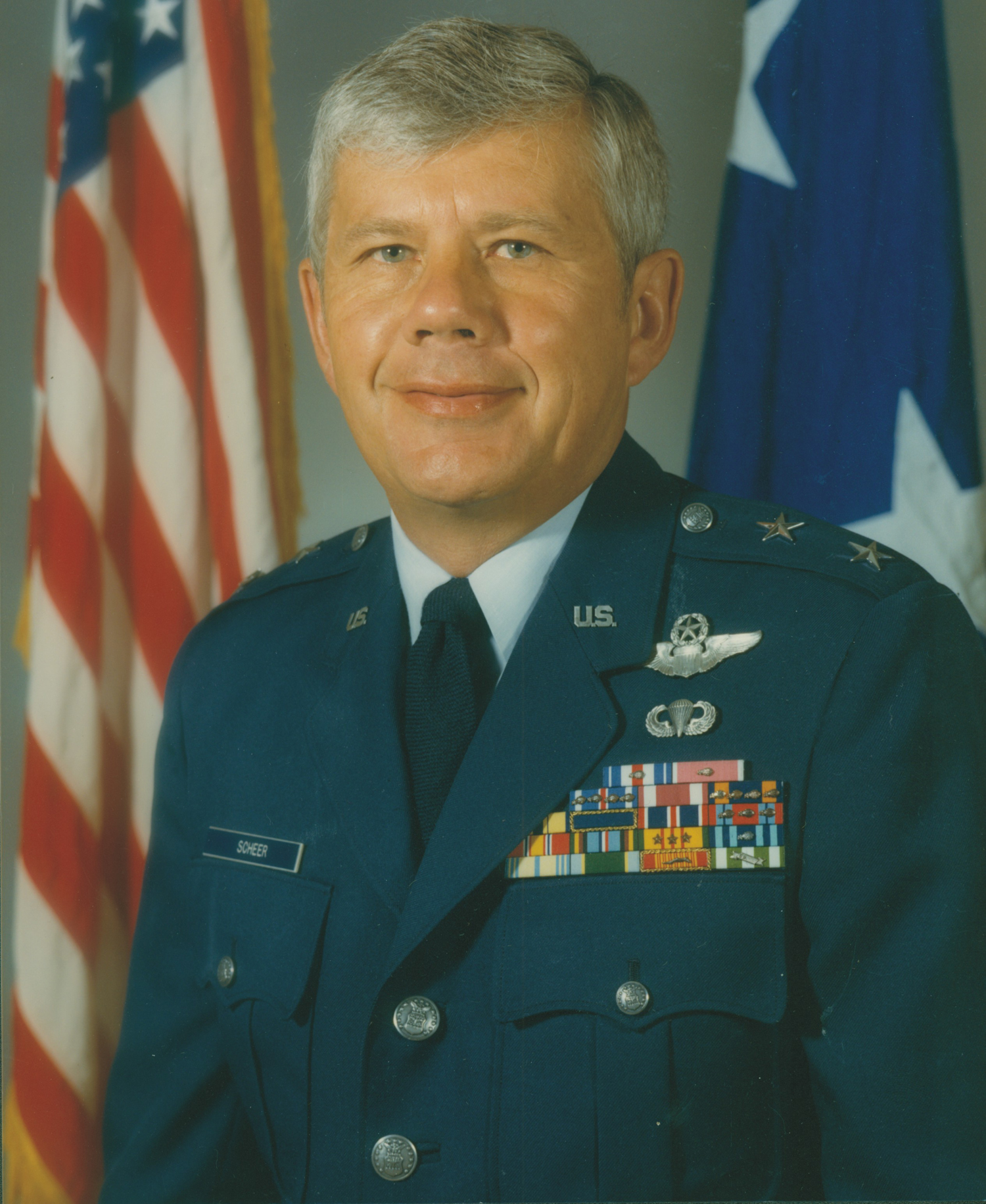
- Born: November 13, 1934 (age 91); Akron, Colorado, U.S.
- Military career
- Allegiance: United States
- Branch: United States Air Force
- Service years: 1958–1990
- Rank: Major General
- Unit: United States Air Force Reserve Command

Roger P. Scheer (born November 13, 1934) was a major general in the United States Air Force who served as Commander of the United States Air Force Reserve Command, Headquarters U.S. Air Force, Washington, D.C., and commander, Headquarters Air Force Reserve, a separate operating agency located at Robins Air Force Base, Georgia. As chief of Air Force Reserve, he served as the principal adviser on Reserve matters to the Air Force Chief of Staff. As commander of AFRES, he had full responsibility for the supervision of U.S. Air Force Reserve units around the world.

Scheer was born in 1934, in Akron, Colorado, and graduated from high school in Hinsdale, Illinois, in 1952. He received a bachelor of science degree in mechanical engineering from the University of Colorado Boulder in 1957 and a master's degree in business administration from Central State University, Edmond, Oklahoma, in 1977.

After receiving his commission as a second lieutenant through the University of Colorado's Air Force Reserve Officer Training Corps program, Scheer earned his pilot wings in 1958 at Webb Air Force Base, Texas. He then completed training at Moody Air Force Base, Georgia, and was assigned to Ramstein Air Base, West Germany, flying F-86Ds with the 514th Fighter-Interceptor Squadron. In 1961 he transferred to Spangdahlem Air Base, West Germany, where he served as standardization and evaluation officer with the 8th Tactical Fighter Squadron, flying F-IOOs and F-lO5s.

He returned to the United States in 1963 and was assigned to the 4th Tactical Fighter Wing, Seymour Johnson Air Force Base, North Carolina, as standardization and evaluation officer, flying F-lO5s. During the last six months of this tour of duty, he was on temporary duty at Incirlik Air Base, Turkey, as a member of a rotational squadron.

Scheer then was assigned to the 67th Tactical Fighter Squadron at Kadena Air Base, Okinawa, in August 1965. Almost immediately, he was sent on temporary duty to Korat Royal Thai Air Force Base, Thailand, where in 1965 and 1967 he flew 168 combat missions. In July 1969 he transferred to the 355th Tactical Fighter Wing at Takhli Royal Thai Air Force Base, Thailand, where he served as operations officer and chief of standardization and evaluation and again flew F-IO5s.

In March 1970 he separated from active duty and joined Loewi and Co. in Chicago as a stockbroker. Eighteen months later, he went to work in the A-I0 Marketing Division of Fairchild-Republic at Farmingdale, New York.

After the Air Force announced that the former C-1 24 Reserve unit at Tinker Air Force Base, Oklahoma, would be the first Air Force Reserve unit to convert to a tactical fighter mission and be assigned F-I05s, General Scheer applied for a full-time air reserve technician position with that unit. He subsequently joined the 507th Tactical Fighter Group at Tinker in early 1972, serving as operations and training officer for the 465th Tactical Fighter Squadron until January 1973 when he was named group commander. In May 1978 he became commander of the 30Ist Tactical Fighter Wing, Carswell Air Force Base, Texas. During his command, the wing and its subordinate units were equipped with F-40s. Scheer served as deputy to the chief of Air Force Reserve at Air Force headquarters from April 1983 until May 1985, when he became commander of 10th Air Force, Bergstrom Air Force Base, Texas. He assumed his present position in November 1986.

A command pilot with more than 5,000 flying hours, Scheer logged almost 450 combat hours in F-I05s during his Southeast Asia tours of duty. His military decorations and awards include the Silver Star with one oak leaf cluster, Legion of Merit with one oak leaf cluster, Distinguished Flying Cross with four oak leaf clusters, Meritorious Service Medal, Air Medal with eight oak leaf clusters, Air Force Commendation Medal, Presidential Unit Citation Emblem, Air Force Outstanding Unit Award Ribbon, Combat Readiness Medal with three oak leaf clusters, National Defense Service Medal, Armed Forces Expeditionary Medal, Vietnam Service Medal with three service stars, Air Force Longevity Service Award Ribbon with four oak leaf clusters, Armed Forces Reserve Medal, Small Arms Expert Marksmanship Ribbon, Republic of Vietnam Gallantry Cross with Palm and Republic of Vietnam Campaign Medal.

His civic affiliations include the Air Force Association; Reserve Officers Association; Fort Worth, Texas, Civic Leaders Association; and the Fort Worth Air Power Council, a group of leading citizens interested in furthering the objectives of the Air Force.

He was promoted to major general June 30, 1986, with same date of rank. He retired on October 29, 1990.
