= List of combatant commanders =

Combatant commanders are four-star general or flag officers who lead one of the large joint-service commands that report directly to the secretary of defense. The proportion of combatant commanders awarded to each service is sometimes interpreted as a sign of which services are currently favored by senior defense leaders.

== History ==
Combatant commands are categorized as geographic or functional, depending on their mission. Geographic combatant commands have territorial responsibility for regions like Europe or the Middle East. Functional combatant commands have missions that cut across territories, like cyber warfare or transportation. A unified combatant command draws forces from multiple services, while a specified combatant command draws forces from only one service.

The first wave of combatant commands, established between 1946 and 1954, included unified geographic commands (Far East Command, Pacific Command, Alaskan Command, Caribbean Command, Northeast Command), specified geographic commands (European Command, Naval Forces, Eastern Atlantic and Mediterranean, U.S. Air Forces in Europe, Atlantic Fleet, a unified functional command (Continental Air Defense Command), and a specified functional command (Strategic Air Command). By 1964 every specified geographic command had either been upgraded to or made a component of a unified geographic command (European Command, Atlantic Command). By 1994 the specified functional commands (now including Aerospace Defense Command, Military Airlift Command, Forces Command) had likewise been folded into unified functional commands (Space Command, Strategic Command, Transportation Command).

In 2014, analyst Russell Rumbaugh identified three distinct eras in combatant commander appointments: a traditional era from 1946 to 1986, during which all commands, unified or not, were almost always held by a specific service; a transitional era from 1986 to 2001, during which the Marine Corps started to break the traditional service monopolies; and the modern era from 2001 to the present, during which most combatant commander appointments became genuinely competitive after defense secretary Donald H. Rumsfeld made a policy of appointing commanders from non-traditional services, with Pacific and Transportation Commands remaining the exceptions that proved the rule.

The distribution of combatant commanders across services can fluctuate widely in the modern era. For example, the Army held six of eleven combatant commands at the start of 2023 but none by the end of 2025. In 2000, the Army briefly held only one of nine combatant commands, including none of the four big regional commands (European, Central, Pacific, Atlantic) for the first time since the command structure was established in 1946, an event that some Army and Air Force officials attributed to a change in the nature of warfare from land to air power, but which others blamed on an unusually weak bench of Army generals that year. The Air Force repeatedly complained about chronic underrepresentation in the three combatant commands that senior leaders identified as the most influential, having never held Pacific or Central Command and only rarely held European Command.

== List of unified and specified combatant commanders ==
| Army | Navy | Air Force | Marine Corps | Space Force |

| Year | Geographic combatant command | | | | | | | Functional combatant command | | | |
| Year | Africa Command | Central Command | European Command | Indo-Pacific Command | Northern Command | Southern Command | Space Command | Cyber Command | Special Operations Command | Strategic Command | Transportation Command |
|---|---|---|---|---|---|---|---|---|---|---|---|
| 2026 | Gen. Dagvin R. M. Anderson | Adm. Charles B. Cooper II | Gen. Alexus G. Grynkewich | Adm. Samuel J. Paparo Jr. | Gen. Gregory M. Guillot | Gen. Francis L. Donovan | Gen. Stephen N. Whiting | Gen. Joshua M. Rudd | Adm. Frank M. Bradley | Adm. Richard A. Correll | Gen. Randall Reed |
| 2026 | Gen. Dagvin R. M. Anderson | Adm. Charles B. Cooper II | Gen. Alexus G. Grynkewich | Adm. Samuel J. Paparo Jr. | Gen. Gregory M. Guillot | Gen. Francis L. Donovan | Gen. Stephen N. Whiting | (vacant) | Adm. Frank M. Bradley | Adm. Richard A. Correll | Gen. Randall Reed |
| 2025 | Gen. Dagvin R. M. Anderson | Adm. Charles B. Cooper II | Gen. Alexus G. Grynkewich | Adm. Samuel J. Paparo Jr. | Gen. Gregory M. Guillot | Adm. Alvin Holsey | Gen. Stephen N. Whiting | (vacant) | Adm. Frank M. Bradley | Gen. Anthony J. Cotton | Gen. Randall Reed |
| 2025 | Gen. Dagvin R. M. Anderson | Adm. Charles B. Cooper II | Gen. Alexus G. Grynkewich | Adm. Samuel J. Paparo Jr. | Gen. Gregory M. Guillot | Adm. Alvin Holsey | Gen. Stephen N. Whiting | (vacant) | Gen. Bryan P. Fenton | Gen. Anthony J. Cotton | Gen. Randall Reed |
| 2025 | Gen. Michael E. Langley | Gen. Michael E. Kurilla | Gen. Christopher G. Cavoli | Adm. Samuel J. Paparo Jr. | Gen. Gregory M. Guillot | Adm. Alvin Holsey | Gen. Stephen N. Whiting | (vacant) | Gen. Bryan P. Fenton | Gen. Anthony J. Cotton | Gen. Randall Reed |
| 2025 | Gen. Michael E. Langley | Gen. Michael E. Kurilla | Gen. Christopher G. Cavoli | Adm. Samuel J. Paparo Jr. | Gen. Gregory M. Guillot | Adm. Alvin Holsey | Gen. Stephen N. Whiting | Gen. Timothy D. Haugh | Gen. Bryan P. Fenton | Gen. Anthony J. Cotton | Gen. Randall Reed |
| 2024 | Gen. Michael E. Langley | Gen. Michael E. Kurilla | Gen. Christopher G. Cavoli | Adm. Samuel J. Paparo Jr. | Gen. Gregory M. Guillot | Adm. Alvin Holsey | Gen. Stephen N. Whiting | Gen. Timothy D. Haugh | Gen. Bryan P. Fenton | Gen. Anthony J. Cotton | Gen. Randall Reed |
| 2024 | Gen. Michael E. Langley | Gen. Michael E. Kurilla | Gen. Christopher G. Cavoli | Adm. Samuel J. Paparo Jr. | Gen. Gregory M. Guillot | Gen. Laura J. Richardson | Gen. Stephen N. Whiting | Gen. Timothy D. Haugh | Gen. Bryan P. Fenton | Gen. Anthony J. Cotton | Gen. Jacqueline D. Van Ovost |
| 2024 | Gen. Michael E. Langley | Gen. Michael E. Kurilla | Gen. Christopher G. Cavoli | Adm. John C. Aquilino | Gen. Gregory M. Guillot | Gen. Laura J. Richardson | Gen. Stephen N. Whiting | Gen. Timothy D. Haugh | Gen. Bryan P. Fenton | Gen. Anthony J. Cotton | Gen. Jacqueline D. Van Ovost |
| 2023 | Gen. Michael E. Langley | Gen. Michael E. Kurilla | Gen. Christopher G. Cavoli | Adm. John C. Aquilino | Gen. Glen D. VanHerck | Gen. Laura J. Richardson | Gen. James H. Dickinson | Gen. Paul M. Nakasone | Gen. Bryan P. Fenton | Gen. Anthony J. Cotton | Gen. Jacqueline D. Van Ovost |
| 2022 | Gen. Michael E. Langley | Gen. Michael E. Kurilla | Gen. Christopher G. Cavoli | Adm. John C. Aquilino | Gen. Glen D. VanHerck | Gen. Laura J. Richardson | Gen. James H. Dickinson | Gen. Paul M. Nakasone | Gen. Bryan P. Fenton | Adm. Charles A. Richard | Gen. Jacqueline D. Van Ovost |
| 2022 | Gen. Michael E. Langley | Gen. Michael E. Kurilla | Gen. Christopher G. Cavoli | Adm. John C. Aquilino | Gen. Glen D. VanHerck | Gen. Laura J. Richardson | Gen. James H. Dickinson | Gen. Paul M. Nakasone | Gen. Richard D. Clarke Jr. | Adm. Charles A. Richard | Gen. Jacqueline D. Van Ovost |
| 2022 | Gen. Stephen J. Townsend | Gen. Michael E. Kurilla | Gen. Tod D. Wolters | Adm. John C. Aquilino | Gen. Glen D. VanHerck | Gen. Laura J. Richardson | Gen. James H. Dickinson | Gen. Paul M. Nakasone | Gen. Richard D. Clarke Jr. | Adm. Charles A. Richard | Gen. Jacqueline D. Van Ovost |
| 2022 | Gen. Stephen J. Townsend | Gen. Kenneth F. McKenzie Jr. | Gen. Tod D. Wolters | Adm. John C. Aquilino | Gen. Glen D. VanHerck | Gen. Laura J. Richardson | Gen. James H. Dickinson | Gen. Paul M. Nakasone | Gen. Richard D. Clarke Jr. | Adm. Charles A. Richard | Gen. Jacqueline D. Van Ovost |
| 2021 | Gen. Stephen J. Townsend | Gen. Kenneth F. McKenzie Jr. | Gen. Tod D. Wolters | Adm. John C. Aquilino | Gen. Glen D. VanHerck | Gen. Laura J. Richardson | Gen. James H. Dickinson | Gen. Paul M. Nakasone | Gen. Richard D. Clarke Jr. | Adm. Charles A. Richard | Gen. Jacqueline D. Van Ovost |
| 2021 | Gen. Stephen J. Townsend | Gen. Kenneth F. McKenzie Jr. | Gen. Tod D. Wolters | Adm. John C. Aquilino | Gen. Glen D. VanHerck | Adm. Craig S. Faller | Gen. James H. Dickinson | Gen. Paul M. Nakasone | Gen. Richard D. Clarke Jr. | Adm. Charles A. Richard | Gen. Stephen R. Lyons |
| 2021 | Gen. Stephen J. Townsend | Gen. Kenneth F. McKenzie Jr. | Gen. Tod D. Wolters | Adm. Philip S. Davidson | Gen. Glen D. VanHerck | Adm. Craig S. Faller | Gen. James H. Dickinson | Gen. Paul M. Nakasone | Gen. Richard D. Clarke Jr. | Adm. Charles A. Richard | Gen. Stephen R. Lyons |
| 2020 | Gen. Stephen J. Townsend | Gen. Kenneth F. McKenzie Jr. | Gen. Tod D. Wolters | Adm. Philip S. Davidson | Gen. Glen D. VanHerck | Adm. Craig S. Faller | Gen. James H. Dickinson | Gen. Paul M. Nakasone | Gen. Richard D. Clarke Jr. | Adm. Charles A. Richard | Gen. Stephen R. Lyons |
| 2020 | Gen. Stephen J. Townsend | Gen. Kenneth F. McKenzie Jr. | Gen. Tod D. Wolters | Adm. Philip S. Davidson | Gen. Terrence J. O'Shaughnessy | Adm. Craig S. Faller | Gen. John W. Raymond | Gen. Paul M. Nakasone | Gen. Richard D. Clarke Jr. | Adm. Charles A. Richard | Gen. Stephen R. Lyons |
| 2019 | Gen. Stephen J. Townsend | Gen. Kenneth F. McKenzie Jr. | Gen. Tod D. Wolters | Adm. Philip S. Davidson | Gen. Terrence J. O'Shaughnessy | Adm. Craig S. Faller | Gen. John W. Raymond | Gen. Paul M. Nakasone | Gen. Richard D. Clarke Jr. | Gen. John E. Hyten | Gen. Stephen R. Lyons |
| 2019 | Gen. Thomas D. Waldhauser | Gen. Kenneth F. McKenzie Jr. | Gen. Curtis M. Scaparrotti | Adm. Philip S. Davidson | Gen. Terrence J. O'Shaughnessy | Adm. Craig S. Faller | | Gen. Paul M. Nakasone | Gen. Richard D. Clarke Jr. | Gen. John E. Hyten | Gen. Stephen R. Lyons |
| 2019 | Gen. Thomas D. Waldhauser | Gen. Joseph L. Votel | Gen. Curtis M. Scaparrotti | Adm. Philip S. Davidson | Gen. Terrence J. O'Shaughnessy | Adm. Craig S. Faller | | Gen. Paul M. Nakasone | Gen. Raymond A. Thomas III | Gen. John E. Hyten | Gen. Stephen R. Lyons |
| 2018 | Gen. Thomas D. Waldhauser | Gen. Joseph L. Votel | Gen. Curtis M. Scaparrotti | Adm. Philip S. Davidson | Gen. Terrence J. O'Shaughnessy | Adm. Kurt W. Tidd | | Gen. Paul M. Nakasone | Gen. Raymond A. Thomas III | Gen. John E. Hyten | Gen. Stephen R. Lyons |
| 2018 | Gen. Thomas D. Waldhauser | Gen. Joseph L. Votel | Gen. Curtis M. Scaparrotti | Adm. Philip S. Davidson | Gen. Terrence J. O'Shaughnessy | Adm. Kurt W. Tidd | | Gen. Paul M. Nakasone | Gen. Raymond A. Thomas III | Gen. John E. Hyten | Gen. Darren W. McDew |
| 2018 | Gen. Thomas D. Waldhauser | Gen. Joseph L. Votel | Gen. Curtis M. Scaparrotti | Pacific Command | Gen. Lori J. Robinson | Adm. Kurt W. Tidd | | Adm. Michael S. Rogers | Gen. Raymond A. Thomas III | Gen. John E. Hyten | Gen. Darren W. McDew |
| 2018 | Gen. Thomas D. Waldhauser | Gen. Joseph L. Votel | Gen. Curtis M. Scaparrotti | Adm. Harry B. Harris Jr. | Gen. Lori J. Robinson | Adm. Kurt W. Tidd | | Adm. Michael S. Rogers | Gen. Raymond A. Thomas III | Gen. John E. Hyten | Gen. Darren W. McDew |
| 2017 | Gen. Thomas D. Waldhauser | Gen. Joseph L. Votel | Gen. Curtis M. Scaparrotti | Adm. Harry B. Harris Jr. | Gen. Lori J. Robinson | Adm. Kurt W. Tidd | | Adm. Michael S. Rogers | Gen. Raymond A. Thomas III | Gen. John E. Hyten | Gen. Darren W. McDew |
| 2016 | Gen. Thomas D. Waldhauser | Gen. Joseph L. Votel | Gen. Curtis M. Scaparrotti | Adm. Harry B. Harris Jr. | Gen. Lori J. Robinson | Adm. Kurt W. Tidd | | | Gen. Raymond A. Thomas III | Gen. John E. Hyten | Gen. Darren W. McDew |
| 2016 | Gen. Thomas D. Waldhauser | Gen. Joseph L. Votel | Gen. Curtis M. Scaparrotti | Adm. Harry B. Harris Jr. | Gen. Lori J. Robinson | Adm. Kurt W. Tidd | | | Gen. Raymond A. Thomas III | Gen. Cecil D. Haney | Gen. Darren W. McDew |
| 2016 | Gen. David M. Rodriguez | Gen. Joseph L. Votel | Gen. Philip M. Breedlove | Adm. Harry B. Harris Jr. | Adm. William E. Gortney | Adm. Kurt W. Tidd | | | Gen. Raymond A. Thomas III | Gen. Cecil D. Haney | Gen. Darren W. McDew |
| 2016 | Gen. David M. Rodriguez | Gen. Lloyd J. Austin III | Gen. Philip M. Breedlove | Adm. Harry B. Harris Jr. | Adm. William E. Gortney | Adm. Kurt W. Tidd | | | Gen. Joseph L. Votel | Gen. Cecil D. Haney | Gen. Darren W. McDew |
| 2015 | Gen. David M. Rodriguez | Gen. Lloyd J. Austin III | Gen. Philip M. Breedlove | Adm. Harry B. Harris Jr. | Adm. William E. Gortney | Gen. John F. Kelly | | | Gen. Joseph L. Votel | Gen. Cecil D. Haney | Gen. Darren W. McDew |
| 2015 | Gen. David M. Rodriguez | Gen. Lloyd J. Austin III | Gen. Philip M. Breedlove | Adm. Harry B. Harris Jr. | Adm. William E. Gortney | Gen. John F. Kelly | | | Gen. Joseph L. Votel | Gen. Cecil D. Haney | Gen. Paul J. Selva |
| 2015 | Gen. David M. Rodriguez | Gen. Lloyd J. Austin III | Gen. Philip M. Breedlove | Adm. Samuel J. Locklear III | Adm. William E. Gortney | Gen. John F. Kelly | | | Gen. Joseph L. Votel | Gen. Cecil D. Haney | Gen. Paul J. Selva |
| 2014 | Gen. David M. Rodriguez | Gen. Lloyd J. Austin III | Gen. Philip M. Breedlove | Adm. Samuel J. Locklear III | Gen. Charles H. Jacoby Jr. | Gen. John F. Kelly | | | Gen. Joseph L. Votel | Gen. Cecil D. Haney | Gen. Paul J. Selva |
| 2014 | Gen. David M. Rodriguez | Gen. Lloyd J. Austin III | Gen. Philip M. Breedlove | Adm. Samuel J. Locklear III | Gen. Charles H. Jacoby Jr. | Gen. John F. Kelly | | | Adm. William H. McRaven | Gen. Cecil D. Haney | Gen. Paul J. Selva |
| 2014 | Gen. David M. Rodriguez | Gen. Lloyd J. Austin III | Gen. Philip M. Breedlove | Adm. Samuel J. Locklear III | Gen. Charles H. Jacoby Jr. | Gen. John F. Kelly | | | Adm. William H. McRaven | Gen. Cecil D. Haney | Gen. William M. Fraser III |
| 2013 | Gen. David M. Rodriguez | Gen. Lloyd J. Austin III | Gen. Philip M. Breedlove | Adm. Samuel J. Locklear III | Gen. Charles H. Jacoby Jr. | Gen. John F. Kelly | | | Adm. William H. McRaven | Gen. Cecil D. Haney | Gen. William M. Fraser III |
| 2013 | Gen. David M. Rodriguez | Gen. Lloyd J. Austin III | Gen. Philip M. Breedlove | Adm. Samuel J. Locklear III | Gen. Charles H. Jacoby Jr. | Gen. John F. Kelly | | | Adm. William H. McRaven | Gen. C. Robert Kehler | Gen. William M. Fraser III |
| 2013 | Gen. David M. Rodriguez | Gen. Lloyd J. Austin III | Adm. James G. Stavridis | Adm. Samuel J. Locklear III | Gen. Charles H. Jacoby Jr. | Gen. John F. Kelly | | | Adm. William H. McRaven | Gen. C. Robert Kehler | Gen. William M. Fraser III |
| 2013 | Gen. Carter F. Ham | Gen. James N. Mattis | Adm. James G. Stavridis | Adm. Samuel J. Locklear III | Gen. Charles H. Jacoby Jr. | Gen. John F. Kelly | | | Adm. William H. McRaven | Gen. C. Robert Kehler | Gen. William M. Fraser III |
| 2012 | Gen. Carter F. Ham | Gen. James N. Mattis | Adm. James G. Stavridis | Adm. Samuel J. Locklear III | Gen. Charles H. Jacoby Jr. | Gen. Douglas M. Fraser | | | Adm. William H. McRaven | Gen. C. Robert Kehler | Gen. William M. Fraser III |
| 2012 | Gen. Carter F. Ham | Gen. James N. Mattis | Adm. James G. Stavridis | Adm. Robert F. Willard | Gen. Charles H. Jacoby Jr. | Gen. Douglas M. Fraser | | | Adm. William H. McRaven | Gen. C. Robert Kehler | Gen. William M. Fraser III |
| 2011 | Gen. Carter F. Ham | Gen. James N. Mattis | Adm. James G. Stavridis | Adm. Robert F. Willard | Gen. Charles H. Jacoby Jr. | Gen. Douglas M. Fraser | Joint Forces Command | | Adm. William H. McRaven | Gen. C. Robert Kehler | Gen. William M. Fraser III |
| 2011 | Gen. Carter F. Ham | Gen. James N. Mattis | Adm. James G. Stavridis | Adm. Robert F. Willard | Gen. Charles H. Jacoby Jr. | Gen. Douglas M. Fraser | Gen. Raymond T. Odierno | | Adm. Eric T. Olson | Gen. C. Robert Kehler | Gen. Duncan J. McNabb |
| 2011 | Gen. Carter F. Ham | Gen. James N. Mattis | Adm. James G. Stavridis | Adm. Robert F. Willard | Adm. James A. Winnefeld Jr. | Gen. Douglas M. Fraser | Gen. Raymond T. Odierno | | Adm. Eric T. Olson | Gen. C. Robert Kehler | Gen. Duncan J. McNabb |
| 2011 | Gen. William E. Ward | Gen. James N. Mattis | Adm. James G. Stavridis | Adm. Robert F. Willard | Adm. James A. Winnefeld Jr. | Gen. Douglas M. Fraser | Gen. Raymond T. Odierno | | Adm. Eric T. Olson | Gen. C. Robert Kehler | Gen. Duncan J. McNabb |
| 2010 | Gen. William E. Ward | Gen. James N. Mattis | Adm. James G. Stavridis | Adm. Robert F. Willard | Adm. James A. Winnefeld Jr. | Gen. Douglas M. Fraser | Gen. Raymond T. Odierno | | Adm. Eric T. Olson | Gen. Kevin P. Chilton | Gen. Duncan J. McNabb |
| 2010 | Gen. William E. Ward | Gen. James N. Mattis | Adm. James G. Stavridis | Adm. Robert F. Willard | Adm. James A. Winnefeld Jr. | Gen. Douglas M. Fraser | Gen. James N. Mattis | | Adm. Eric T. Olson | Gen. Kevin P. Chilton | Gen. Duncan J. McNabb |
| 2010 | Gen. William E. Ward | Gen. David H. Petraeus | Adm. James G. Stavridis | Adm. Robert F. Willard | Gen. Victor E. Renuart Jr. | Gen. Douglas M. Fraser | Gen. James N. Mattis | | Adm. Eric T. Olson | Gen. Kevin P. Chilton | Gen. Duncan J. McNabb |
| 2009 | Gen. William E. Ward | Gen. David H. Petraeus | Adm. James G. Stavridis | Adm. Robert F. Willard | Gen. Victor E. Renuart Jr. | Gen. Douglas M. Fraser | Gen. James N. Mattis | | Adm. Eric T. Olson | Gen. Kevin P. Chilton | Gen. Duncan J. McNabb |
| 2009 | Gen. William E. Ward | Gen. David H. Petraeus | Adm. James G. Stavridis | Adm. Timothy J. Keating | Gen. Victor E. Renuart Jr. | Gen. Douglas M. Fraser | Gen. James N. Mattis | | Adm. Eric T. Olson | Gen. Kevin P. Chilton | Gen. Duncan J. McNabb |
| 2009 | Gen. William E. Ward | Gen. David H. Petraeus | Gen. Bantz J. Craddock | Adm. Timothy J. Keating | Gen. Victor E. Renuart Jr. | Adm. James G. Stavridis | Gen. James N. Mattis | | Adm. Eric T. Olson | Gen. Kevin P. Chilton | Gen. Duncan J. McNabb |
| 2008 | Gen. William E. Ward | Gen. David H. Petraeus | Gen. Bantz J. Craddock | Adm. Timothy J. Keating | Gen. Victor E. Renuart Jr. | Adm. James G. Stavridis | Gen. James N. Mattis | | Adm. Eric T. Olson | Gen. Kevin P. Chilton | Gen. Duncan J. McNabb |
| 2008 | | (vacant) | Gen. Bantz J. Craddock | Adm. Timothy J. Keating | Gen. Victor E. Renuart Jr. | Adm. James G. Stavridis | Gen. James N. Mattis | | Adm. Eric T. Olson | Gen. Kevin P. Chilton | Gen. Norton A. Schwartz |
| 2008 | | Adm. William J. Fallon | Gen. Bantz J. Craddock | Adm. Timothy J. Keating | Gen. Victor E. Renuart Jr. | Adm. James G. Stavridis | Gen. James N. Mattis | | Adm. Eric T. Olson | Gen. Kevin P. Chilton | Gen. Norton A. Schwartz |
| 2007 | | Adm. William J. Fallon | Gen. Bantz J. Craddock | Adm. Timothy J. Keating | Gen. Victor E. Renuart Jr. | Adm. James G. Stavridis | Gen. James N. Mattis | | Adm. Eric T. Olson | Gen. Kevin P. Chilton | Gen. Norton A. Schwartz |
| 2007 | | Adm. William J. Fallon | Gen. Bantz J. Craddock | Adm. Timothy J. Keating | Gen. Victor E. Renuart Jr. | Adm. James G. Stavridis | Gen. Lance L. Smith | | Adm. Eric T. Olson | (vacant) | Gen. Norton A. Schwartz |
| 2007 | | Adm. William J. Fallon | Gen. Bantz J. Craddock | Adm. Timothy J. Keating | Gen. Victor E. Renuart Jr. | Adm. James G. Stavridis | Gen. Lance L. Smith | | Gen. Bryan D. Brown | Gen. James E. Cartwright | Gen. Norton A. Schwartz |
| 2007 | | Gen. John P. Abizaid | Gen. Bantz J. Craddock | Adm. William J. Fallon | Adm. Timothy J. Keating | Adm. James G. Stavridis | Gen. Lance L. Smith | | Gen. Bryan D. Brown | Gen. James E. Cartwright | Gen. Norton A. Schwartz |
| 2006 | | Gen. John P. Abizaid | Gen. James L. Jones | Adm. William J. Fallon | Adm. Timothy J. Keating | Adm. James G. Stavridis | Gen. Lance L. Smith | | Gen. Bryan D. Brown | Gen. James E. Cartwright | Gen. Norton A. Schwartz |
| 2006 | | Gen. John P. Abizaid | Gen. James L. Jones | Adm. William J. Fallon | Adm. Timothy J. Keating | Gen. Bantz J. Craddock | Gen. Lance L. Smith | | Gen. Bryan D. Brown | Gen. James E. Cartwright | Gen. Norton A. Schwartz |
| 2005 | | Gen. John P. Abizaid | Gen. James L. Jones | Adm. William J. Fallon | Adm. Timothy J. Keating | Gen. Bantz J. Craddock | Gen. Lance L. Smith | | Gen. Bryan D. Brown | Gen. James E. Cartwright | Gen. Norton A. Schwartz |
| 2005 | | Gen. John P. Abizaid | Gen. James L. Jones | Adm. William J. Fallon | Adm. Timothy J. Keating | Gen. Bantz J. Craddock | (vacant) | | Gen. Bryan D. Brown | Gen. James E. Cartwright | Gen. John W. Handy |
| 2005 | | Gen. John P. Abizaid | Gen. James L. Jones | Adm. William J. Fallon | Adm. Timothy J. Keating | Gen. Bantz J. Craddock | Adm. Edmund P. Giambastiani Jr. | | Gen. Bryan D. Brown | Gen. James E. Cartwright | Gen. John W. Handy |
| 2005 | | Gen. John P. Abizaid | Gen. James L. Jones | Adm. Thomas B. Fargo | Adm. Timothy J. Keating | Gen. Bantz J. Craddock | Adm. Edmund P. Giambastiani Jr. | | Gen. Bryan D. Brown | Gen. James E. Cartwright | Gen. John W. Handy |
| 2004 | | Gen. John P. Abizaid | Gen. James L. Jones | Adm. Thomas B. Fargo | Adm. Timothy J. Keating | Gen. Bantz J. Craddock | Adm. Edmund P. Giambastiani Jr. | | Gen. Bryan D. Brown | Gen. James E. Cartwright | Gen. John W. Handy |
| 2004 | | Gen. John P. Abizaid | Gen. James L. Jones | Adm. Thomas B. Fargo | Gen. Ralph E. Eberhart | Gen. James T. Hill | Adm. Edmund P. Giambastiani Jr. | | Gen. Bryan D. Brown | (vacant) | Gen. John W. Handy |
| 2004 | | Gen. John P. Abizaid | Gen. James L. Jones | Adm. Thomas B. Fargo | Gen. Ralph E. Eberhart | Gen. James T. Hill | Adm. Edmund P. Giambastiani Jr. | | Gen. Bryan D. Brown | Adm. James O. Ellis Jr. | Gen. John W. Handy |
| 2003 | | Gen. John P. Abizaid | Gen. James L. Jones | Adm. Thomas B. Fargo | Gen. Ralph E. Eberhart | Gen. James T. Hill | Adm. Edmund P. Giambastiani Jr. | | Gen. Bryan D. Brown | Adm. James O. Ellis Jr. | Gen. John W. Handy |
| 2003 | | Gen. John P. Abizaid | Gen. James L. Jones | Adm. Thomas B. Fargo | Gen. Ralph E. Eberhart | Gen. James T. Hill | Adm. Edmund P. Giambastiani Jr. | | Gen. Charles R. Holland | Adm. James O. Ellis Jr. | Gen. John W. Handy |
| 2003 | | Gen. Tommy R. Franks | Gen. James L. Jones | Adm. Thomas B. Fargo | Gen. Ralph E. Eberhart | Gen. James T. Hill | Adm. Edmund P. Giambastiani Jr. | | Gen. Charles R. Holland | Adm. James O. Ellis Jr. | Gen. John W. Handy |
| 2002 | | Gen. Tommy R. Franks | Gen. Joseph W. Ralston | Adm. Thomas B. Fargo | Space Command | Gen. James T. Hill | Adm. Edmund P. Giambastiani Jr. | | Gen. Charles R. Holland | Adm. James O. Ellis Jr. | Gen. John W. Handy |
| 2002 | | Gen. Tommy R. Franks | Gen. Joseph W. Ralston | Adm. Thomas B. Fargo | Gen. Ralph E. Eberhart | (vacant) | Gen. William F. Kernan | | Gen. Charles R. Holland | Adm. James O. Ellis Jr. | Gen. John W. Handy |
| 2002 | | Gen. Tommy R. Franks | Gen. Joseph W. Ralston | Adm. Dennis C. Blair | Gen. Ralph E. Eberhart | (vacant) | Gen. William F. Kernan | | Gen. Charles R. Holland | Adm. James O. Ellis Jr. | Gen. John W. Handy |
| 2001 | | Gen. Tommy R. Franks | Gen. Joseph W. Ralston | Adm. Dennis C. Blair | Gen. Ralph E. Eberhart | (vacant) | Gen. William F. Kernan | | Gen. Charles R. Holland | Adm. Richard W. Mies | Gen. John W. Handy |
| 2001 | | Gen. Tommy R. Franks | Gen. Joseph W. Ralston | Adm. Dennis C. Blair | Gen. Ralph E. Eberhart | Gen. Peter Pace | Gen. William F. Kernan | | Gen. Charles R. Holland | Adm. Richard W. Mies | Gen. Charles T. Robertson Jr. |
| 2000 | | Gen. Tommy R. Franks | Gen. Joseph W. Ralston | Adm. Dennis C. Blair | Gen. Ralph E. Eberhart | Gen. Peter Pace | Gen. William F. Kernan | | Gen. Charles R. Holland | Adm. Richard W. Mies | Gen. Charles T. Robertson Jr. |
| 2000 | | Gen. Tommy R. Franks | Gen. Joseph W. Ralston | Adm. Dennis C. Blair | Gen. Ralph E. Eberhart | Gen. Charles E. Wilhelm | Adm. Harold W. Gehman Jr. | | Gen. Peter J. Schoomaker | Adm. Richard W. Mies | Gen. Charles T. Robertson Jr. |
| 2000 | | Gen. Anthony C. Zinni | Gen. Wesley K. Clark | Adm. Dennis C. Blair | Gen. Ralph E. Eberhart | Gen. Charles E. Wilhelm | Adm. Harold W. Gehman Jr. | | Gen. Peter J. Schoomaker | Adm. Richard W. Mies | Gen. Charles T. Robertson Jr. |
| 2000 | | Gen. Anthony C. Zinni | Gen. Wesley K. Clark | Adm. Dennis C. Blair | Gen. Richard B. Myers | Gen. Charles E. Wilhelm | Adm. Harold W. Gehman Jr. | | Gen. Peter J. Schoomaker | Adm. Richard W. Mies | Gen. Charles T. Robertson Jr. |
| 1999 | | Gen. Anthony C. Zinni | Gen. Wesley K. Clark | Adm. Dennis C. Blair | Gen. Richard B. Myers | Gen. Charles E. Wilhelm | Adm. Harold W. Gehman Jr. | | Gen. Peter J. Schoomaker | Adm. Richard W. Mies | Gen. Charles T. Robertson Jr. |
| 1999 | | Gen. Anthony C. Zinni | Gen. Wesley K. Clark | Adm. Dennis C. Blair | Gen. Richard B. Myers | Gen. Charles E. Wilhelm | Atlantic Command | | Gen. Peter J. Schoomaker | Adm. Richard W. Mies | Gen. Charles T. Robertson Jr. |
| 1999 | | Gen. Anthony C. Zinni | Gen. Wesley K. Clark | Adm. Dennis C. Blair | Gen. Richard B. Myers | Gen. Charles E. Wilhelm | Adm. Harold W. Gehman Jr. | | Gen. Peter J. Schoomaker | Adm. Richard W. Mies | Gen. Charles T. Robertson Jr. |
| 1999 | | Gen. Anthony C. Zinni | Gen. Wesley K. Clark | Adm. Joseph W. Prueher | Gen. Richard B. Myers | Gen. Charles E. Wilhelm | Adm. Harold W. Gehman Jr. | | Gen. Peter J. Schoomaker | Adm. Richard W. Mies | Gen. Charles T. Robertson Jr. |
| 1998 | | Gen. Anthony C. Zinni | Gen. Wesley K. Clark | Adm. Joseph W. Prueher | Gen. Richard B. Myers | Gen. Charles E. Wilhelm | Adm. Harold W. Gehman Jr. | | Gen. Peter J. Schoomaker | Adm. Richard W. Mies | Gen. Charles T. Robertson Jr. |
| 1998 | | Gen. Anthony C. Zinni | Gen. Wesley K. Clark | Adm. Joseph W. Prueher | Gen. Howell M. Estes III | Gen. Charles E. Wilhelm | Adm. Harold W. Gehman Jr. | | Gen. Peter J. Schoomaker | Gen. Eugene E. Habiger | Gen. Walter Kross |
| 1997 | | Gen. Anthony C. Zinni | Gen. Wesley K. Clark | Adm. Joseph W. Prueher | Gen. Howell M. Estes III | Gen. Charles E. Wilhelm | Adm. Harold W. Gehman Jr. | | Gen. Peter J. Schoomaker | Gen. Eugene E. Habiger | Gen. Walter Kross |
| 1997 | | Gen. Anthony C. Zinni | Gen. Wesley K. Clark | Adm. Joseph W. Prueher | Gen. Howell M. Estes III | (vacant) | Gen. John J. Sheehan | | Gen. Henry H. Shelton | Gen. Eugene E. Habiger | Gen. Walter Kross |
| 1997 | | Gen. J. H. Binford Peay III | Gen. George A. Joulwan | Adm. Joseph W. Prueher | Gen. Howell M. Estes III | Gen. Wesley K. Clark | Gen. John J. Sheehan | | Gen. Henry H. Shelton | Gen. Eugene E. Habiger | Gen. Walter Kross |
| 1996 | | Gen. J. H. Binford Peay III | Gen. George A. Joulwan | Adm. Joseph W. Prueher | Gen. Howell M. Estes III | Gen. Wesley K. Clark | Gen. John J. Sheehan | | Gen. Henry H. Shelton | Gen. Eugene E. Habiger | Gen. Walter Kross |
| 1996 | | Gen. J. H. Binford Peay III | Gen. George A. Joulwan | Adm. Joseph W. Prueher | Gen. Joseph W. Ashy | Gen. Wesley K. Clark | Gen. John J. Sheehan | | Gen. Henry H. Shelton | Gen. Eugene E. Habiger | Gen. Walter Kross |
| 1996 | | Gen. J. H. Binford Peay III | Gen. George A. Joulwan | Adm. Joseph W. Prueher | Gen. Joseph W. Ashy | (vacant) | Gen. John J. Sheehan | | Gen. Henry H. Shelton | Gen. Eugene E. Habiger | Gen. Robert L. Rutherford |
| 1996 | | Gen. J. H. Binford Peay III | Gen. George A. Joulwan | Adm. Joseph W. Prueher | Gen. Joseph W. Ashy | Gen. Barry R. McCaffrey | Gen. John J. Sheehan | | Gen. Wayne A. Downing | Adm. Henry G. Chiles Jr. | Gen. Robert L. Rutherford |
| 1995 | | Gen. J. H. Binford Peay III | Gen. George A. Joulwan | Adm. Richard C. Macke | Gen. Joseph W. Ashy | Gen. Barry R. McCaffrey | Gen. John J. Sheehan | | Gen. Wayne A. Downing | Adm. Henry G. Chiles Jr. | Gen. Robert L. Rutherford |
| 1994 | | Gen. J. H. Binford Peay III | Gen. George A. Joulwan | Adm. Richard C. Macke | Gen. Joseph W. Ashy | Gen. Barry R. McCaffrey | Gen. John J. Sheehan | | Gen. Wayne A. Downing | Adm. Henry G. Chiles Jr. | Gen. Robert L. Rutherford |
| 1994 | | Gen. J. H. Binford Peay III | Gen. George A. Joulwan | Adm. Richard C. Macke | Gen. Charles A. Horner | Gen. Barry R. McCaffrey | Adm. Paul D. Miller | | Gen. Wayne A. Downing | Adm. Henry G. Chiles Jr. | Gen. Ronald R. Fogleman |
| 1994 | | Gen. Joseph P. Hoar | Gen. George A. Joulwan | Adm. Charles R. Larson | Gen. Charles A. Horner | Gen. Barry R. McCaffrey | Adm. Paul D. Miller | | Gen. Wayne A. Downing | Adm. Henry G. Chiles Jr. | Gen. Ronald R. Fogleman |
| 1994 | | Gen. Joseph P. Hoar | Gen. George A. Joulwan | Adm. Charles R. Larson | Gen. Charles A. Horner | (vacant) | Adm. Paul D. Miller | | Gen. Wayne A. Downing | Adm. Henry G. Chiles Jr. | Gen. Ronald R. Fogleman |
| 1993 | | Gen. Joseph P. Hoar | Gen. George A. Joulwan | Adm. Charles R. Larson | Gen. Charles A. Horner | (vacant) | Adm. Paul D. Miller | Forces Command | Gen. Wayne A. Downing | Gen. George L. Butler | Gen. Ronald R. Fogleman |
| 1993 | | Gen. Joseph P. Hoar | Gen. John M. D. Shalikashvili | Adm. Charles R. Larson | Gen. Charles A. Horner | Gen. George A. Joulwan | Adm. Paul D. Miller | Gen. Dennis J. Reimer | Gen. Wayne A. Downing | Gen. George L. Butler | Gen. Ronald R. Fogleman |
| 1993 | | Gen. Joseph P. Hoar | Gen. John M. D. Shalikashvili | Adm. Charles R. Larson | Gen. Charles A. Horner | Gen. George A. Joulwan | Adm. Paul D. Miller | Gen. Dennis J. Reimer | Gen. Carl W. Stiner | Gen. George L. Butler | Gen. Ronald R. Fogleman |
| 1993 | | Gen. Joseph P. Hoar | Gen. John M. D. Shalikashvili | Adm. Charles R. Larson | Gen. Charles A. Horner | Gen. George A. Joulwan | Adm. Paul D. Miller | Gen. Edwin H. Burba Jr. | Gen. Carl W. Stiner | Gen. George L. Butler | Gen. Ronald R. Fogleman |
| 1992 | | Gen. Joseph P. Hoar | Gen. John M. D. Shalikashvili | Adm. Charles R. Larson | Gen. Charles A. Horner | Gen. George A. Joulwan | Adm. Paul D. Miller | Gen. Edwin H. Burba Jr. | Gen. Carl W. Stiner | Gen. George L. Butler | Gen. Ronald R. Fogleman |
| 1992 | | Gen. Joseph P. Hoar | Gen. John M. D. Shalikashvili | Adm. Charles R. Larson | Gen. Charles A. Horner | Gen. George A. Joulwan | Adm. Paul D. Miller | Gen. Edwin H. Burba Jr. | Gen. Carl W. Stiner | Gen. George L. Butler | Gen. Hansford T. Johnson |
| 1992 | | Gen. Joseph P. Hoar | Gen. John R. Galvin | Adm. Charles R. Larson | Gen. Donald J. Kutyna | Gen. George A. Joulwan | Adm. Leon A. Edney | Gen. Edwin H. Burba Jr. | Gen. Carl W. Stiner | Strategic Air Command | Gen. Hansford T. Johnson |
| 1992 | | Gen. Joseph P. Hoar | Gen. John R. Galvin | Adm. Charles R. Larson | Gen. Donald J. Kutyna | Gen. George A. Joulwan | Adm. Leon A. Edney | Gen. Edwin H. Burba Jr. | Gen. Carl W. Stiner | Gen. George L. Butler | Gen. Hansford T. Johnson |
| 1991 | | Gen. Joseph P. Hoar | Gen. John R. Galvin | Adm. Charles R. Larson | Gen. Donald J. Kutyna | Gen. George A. Joulwan | Adm. Leon A. Edney | Gen. Edwin H. Burba Jr. | Gen. Carl W. Stiner | Gen. George L. Butler | Gen. Hansford T. Johnson |
| 1991 | | Gen. H. Norman Schwarzkopf Jr. | Gen. John R. Galvin | Adm. Charles R. Larson | Gen. Donald J. Kutyna | Gen. George A. Joulwan | Adm. Leon A. Edney | Gen. Edwin H. Burba Jr. | Gen. Carl W. Stiner | Gen. George L. Butler | Gen. Hansford T. Johnson |
| 1991 | | Gen. H. Norman Schwarzkopf Jr. | Gen. John R. Galvin | Adm. Huntington Hardisty | Gen. Donald J. Kutyna | Gen. George A. Joulwan | Adm. Leon A. Edney | Gen. Edwin H. Burba Jr. | Gen. Carl W. Stiner | Gen. George L. Butler | Gen. Hansford T. Johnson |
| 1990 | | Gen. H. Norman Schwarzkopf Jr. | Gen. John R. Galvin | Adm. Huntington Hardisty | Gen. Donald J. Kutyna | Gen. George A. Joulwan | Adm. Leon A. Edney | Gen. Edwin H. Burba Jr. | Gen. Carl W. Stiner | Gen. John T. Chain Jr. | Gen. Hansford T. Johnson |
| 1990 | | Gen. H. Norman Schwarzkopf Jr. | Gen. John R. Galvin | Adm. Huntington Hardisty | Gen. Donald J. Kutyna | Gen. Maxwell R. Thurman | Adm. Leon A. Edney | Gen. Edwin H. Burba Jr. | Gen. Carl W. Stiner | Gen. John T. Chain Jr. | Gen. Hansford T. Johnson |
| 1990 | | Gen. H. Norman Schwarzkopf Jr. | Gen. John R. Galvin | Adm. Huntington Hardisty | Gen. Donald J. Kutyna | Gen. Maxwell R. Thurman | Adm. Frank B. Kelso II | Gen. Edwin H. Burba Jr. | Gen. James J. Lindsay | Gen. John T. Chain Jr. | Gen. Hansford T. Johnson |
| 1990 | | Gen. H. Norman Schwarzkopf Jr. | Gen. John R. Galvin | Adm. Huntington Hardisty | Gen. John L. Piotrowski | Gen. Maxwell R. Thurman | Adm. Frank B. Kelso II | Gen. Edwin H. Burba Jr. | Gen. James J. Lindsay | Gen. John T. Chain Jr. | Gen. Hansford T. Johnson |
| 1989 | | Gen. H. Norman Schwarzkopf Jr. | Gen. John R. Galvin | Adm. Huntington Hardisty | Gen. John L. Piotrowski | Gen. Maxwell R. Thurman | Adm. Frank B. Kelso II | Gen. Edwin H. Burba Jr. | Gen. James J. Lindsay | Gen. John T. Chain Jr. | Gen. Hansford T. Johnson |
| 1989 | | Gen. H. Norman Schwarzkopf Jr. | Gen. John R. Galvin | Adm. Huntington Hardisty | Gen. John L. Piotrowski | Gen. Frederick F. Woerner | Adm. Frank B. Kelso II | Gen. Colin L. Powell | Gen. James J. Lindsay | Gen. John T. Chain Jr. | Gen. Duane H. Cassidy |
| 1989 | | Gen. H. Norman Schwarzkopf Jr. | Gen. John R. Galvin | Adm. Huntington Hardisty | Gen. John L. Piotrowski | Gen. Frederick F. Woerner | Adm. Frank B. Kelso II | Gen. Joseph T. Palastra Jr. | Gen. James J. Lindsay | Gen. John T. Chain Jr. | Gen. Duane H. Cassidy |
| 1988 | | Gen. George B. Crist | Gen. John R. Galvin | Adm. Huntington Hardisty | Gen. John L. Piotrowski | Gen. Frederick F. Woerner | Adm. Lee Baggett Jr. | Gen. Joseph T. Palastra Jr. | Gen. James J. Lindsay | Gen. John T. Chain Jr. | Gen. Duane H. Cassidy |
| 1988 | | Gen. George B. Crist | Gen. John R. Galvin | Adm. Ronald J. Hays | Gen. John L. Piotrowski | Gen. Frederick F. Woerner | Adm. Lee Baggett Jr. | Gen. Joseph T. Palastra Jr. | Gen. James J. Lindsay | Gen. John T. Chain Jr. | Gen. Duane H. Cassidy |
| 1987 | | Gen. George B. Crist | Gen. John R. Galvin | Adm. Ronald J. Hays | Gen. John L. Piotrowski | Gen. Frederick F. Woerner | Adm. Lee Baggett Jr. | Gen. Joseph T. Palastra Jr. | Gen. James J. Lindsay | Gen. John T. Chain Jr. | Gen. Duane H. Cassidy |
| 1987 | | Gen. George B. Crist | Gen. Bernard W. Rogers | Adm. Ronald J. Hays | Gen. John L. Piotrowski | Gen. John R. Galvin | Adm. Lee Baggett Jr. | Readiness Command | Gen. James J. Lindsay | Gen. John T. Chain Jr. | Military Airlift Command |
| 1987 | | Gen. George B. Crist | Gen. Bernard W. Rogers | Adm. Ronald J. Hays | Gen. John L. Piotrowski | Gen. John R. Galvin | Adm. Lee Baggett Jr. | Gen. James J. Lindsay | | Gen. John T. Chain Jr. | Gen. Duane H. Cassidy |
| 1986 | | Gen. George B. Crist | Gen. Bernard W. Rogers | Adm. Ronald J. Hays | Gen. Robert T. Herres | Gen. John R. Galvin | Adm. Lee Baggett Jr. | Gen. James J. Lindsay | | Gen. John T. Chain Jr. | Gen. Duane H. Cassidy |
| 1986 | | Gen. George B. Crist | Gen. Bernard W. Rogers | Adm. Ronald J. Hays | Gen. Robert T. Herres | Gen. John R. Galvin | Adm. Lee Baggett Jr. | Gen. Fred K. Mahaffey | | Gen. John T. Chain Jr. | Gen. Duane H. Cassidy |
| 1986 | | Gen. George B. Crist | Gen. Bernard W. Rogers | Adm. Ronald J. Hays | Gen. Robert T. Herres | Gen. John R. Galvin | Adm. Lee Baggett Jr. | Gen. Fred K. Mahaffey | | Gen. Larry D. Welch | Gen. Duane H. Cassidy |
| 1985 | | Gen. Robert C. Kingston | Gen. Bernard W. Rogers | Adm. Ronald J. Hays | Aerospace Defense Command | Gen. John R. Galvin | Adm. Wesley L. McDonald | Gen. Fred K. Mahaffey | | Gen. Larry D. Welch | Gen. Duane H. Cassidy |
| 1985 | | Gen. Robert C. Kingston | Gen. Bernard W. Rogers | Adm. William J. Crowe Jr. | Gen. Robert T. Herres | Gen. John R. Galvin | Adm. Wesley L. McDonald | Gen. Fred K. Mahaffey | | Gen. Larry D. Welch | Gen. Thomas M. Ryan Jr. |
| 1985 | | Gen. Robert C. Kingston | Gen. Bernard W. Rogers | Adm. William J. Crowe Jr. | Gen. Robert T. Herres | Gen. John R. Galvin | Adm. Wesley L. McDonald | Gen. Wallace H. Nutting | | Gen. Bennie L. Davis | Gen. Thomas M. Ryan Jr. |
| 1985 | | Gen. Robert C. Kingston | Gen. Bernard W. Rogers | Adm. William J. Crowe Jr. | Gen. Robert T. Herres | Gen. Paul F. Gorman | Adm. Wesley L. McDonald | Gen. Wallace H. Nutting | | Gen. Bennie L. Davis | Gen. Thomas M. Ryan Jr. |
| 1984 | | Gen. Robert C. Kingston | Gen. Bernard W. Rogers | Adm. William J. Crowe Jr. | Gen. Robert T. Herres | Gen. Paul F. Gorman | Adm. Wesley L. McDonald | Gen. Wallace H. Nutting | | Gen. Bennie L. Davis | Gen. Thomas M. Ryan Jr. |
| 1984 | | Lt. Gen. Robert C. Kingston | Gen. Bernard W. Rogers | Adm. William J. Crowe Jr. | Gen. Robert T. Herres | Gen. Paul F. Gorman | Adm. Wesley L. McDonald | Gen. Wallace H. Nutting | | Gen. Bennie L. Davis | Gen. Thomas M. Ryan Jr. |
| 1984 | | Lt. Gen. Robert C. Kingston | Gen. Bernard W. Rogers | Adm. William J. Crowe Jr. | Gen. James V. Hartinger | Gen. Paul F. Gorman | Adm. Wesley L. McDonald | Gen. Wallace H. Nutting | | Gen. Bennie L. Davis | Gen. Thomas M. Ryan Jr. |
| 1983 | | Lt. Gen. Robert C. Kingston | Gen. Bernard W. Rogers | Adm. William J. Crowe Jr. | Gen. James V. Hartinger | Gen. Paul F. Gorman | Adm. Wesley L. McDonald | Gen. Wallace H. Nutting | | Gen. Bennie L. Davis | Gen. Thomas M. Ryan Jr. |
| 1983 | | Lt. Gen. Robert C. Kingston | Gen. Bernard W. Rogers | Adm. Robert L. J. Long | Gen. James V. Hartinger | Lt. Gen. Wallace H. Nutting | Adm. Wesley L. McDonald | Gen. Donn A. Starry | | Gen. Bennie L. Davis | Gen. James R. Allen |
| 1982 | | | Gen. Bernard W. Rogers | Adm. Robert L. J. Long | Gen. James V. Hartinger | Lt. Gen. Wallace H. Nutting | Adm. Wesley L. McDonald | Gen. Donn A. Starry | | Gen. Bennie L. Davis | Gen. James R. Allen |
| 1982 | | | Gen. Bernard W. Rogers | Adm. Robert L. J. Long | Gen. James V. Hartinger | Lt. Gen. Wallace H. Nutting | Adm. Harry D. Train II | Gen. Donn A. Starry | | Gen. Bennie L. Davis | Gen. James R. Allen |
| 1981 | | | Gen. Bernard W. Rogers | Adm. Robert L. J. Long | Gen. James V. Hartinger | Lt. Gen. Wallace H. Nutting | Adm. Harry D. Train II | Gen. Donn A. Starry | | Gen. Bennie L. Davis | Gen. James R. Allen |
| 1981 | | | Gen. Bernard W. Rogers | Adm. Robert L. J. Long | Lt. Gen. James V. Hartinger | Lt. Gen. Wallace H. Nutting | Adm. Harry D. Train II | Gen. Donn A. Starry | | Gen. Bennie L. Davis | Gen. James R. Allen |
| 1981 | | | Gen. Bernard W. Rogers | Adm. Robert L. J. Long | Lt. Gen. James V. Hartinger | Lt. Gen. Wallace H. Nutting | Adm. Harry D. Train II | Gen. Volney F. Warner | | Gen. Richard H. Ellis | Gen. Robert E. Huyser |
| 1980 | | | Gen. Bernard W. Rogers | Adm. Robert L. J. Long | Lt. Gen. James V. Hartinger | Lt. Gen. Wallace H. Nutting | Adm. Harry D. Train II | Gen. Volney F. Warner | | Gen. Richard H. Ellis | Gen. Robert E. Huyser |
| 1979 | | | Gen. Bernard W. Rogers | Adm. Robert L. J. Long | Gen. James E. Hill | Lt. Gen. Wallace H. Nutting | Adm. Harry D. Train II | Gen. Volney F. Warner | | Gen. Richard H. Ellis | Gen. Robert E. Huyser |
| 1979 | | | Gen. Bernard W. Rogers | Adm. Maurice F. Weisner | Gen. James E. Hill | Lt. Gen. Dennis P. McAuliffe | Adm. Harry D. Train II | Gen. Volney F. Warner | | Gen. Richard H. Ellis | Gen. Robert E. Huyser |
| 1979 | | | Gen. Alexander M. Haig Jr. | Adm. Maurice F. Weisner | Gen. James E. Hill | Lt. Gen. Dennis P. McAuliffe | Adm. Harry D. Train II | Gen. John J. Hennessey | | Gen. Richard H. Ellis | Gen. William G. Moore Jr. |
| 1978 | | | Gen. Alexander M. Haig Jr. | Adm. Maurice F. Weisner | Gen. James E. Hill | Lt. Gen. Dennis P. McAuliffe | Adm. Harry D. Train II | Gen. John J. Hennessey | | Gen. Richard H. Ellis | Gen. William G. Moore Jr. |
| 1978 | | | Gen. Alexander M. Haig Jr. | Adm. Maurice F. Weisner | Gen. James E. Hill | Lt. Gen. Dennis P. McAuliffe | Adm. Isaac C. Kidd Jr. | Gen. John J. Hennessey | | Gen. Richard H. Ellis | Gen. William G. Moore Jr. |
| 1977 | | | Gen. Alexander M. Haig Jr. | Adm. Maurice F. Weisner | Gen. Daniel James Jr. | Lt. Gen. Dennis P. McAuliffe | Adm. Isaac C. Kidd Jr. | Gen. John J. Hennessey | | Gen. Richard H. Ellis | Gen. William G. Moore Jr. |
| 1977 | | | Gen. Alexander M. Haig Jr. | Adm. Maurice F. Weisner | Gen. Daniel James Jr. | Lt. Gen. Dennis P. McAuliffe | Adm. Isaac C. Kidd Jr. | Gen. John J. Hennessey | | Gen. Russell E. Dougherty | Gen. William G. Moore Jr. |
| 1977 | | | Gen. Alexander M. Haig Jr. | Adm. Maurice F. Weisner | Gen. Daniel James Jr. | Lt. Gen. Dennis P. McAuliffe | Adm. Isaac C. Kidd Jr. | Gen. John J. Hennessey | | Gen. Russell E. Dougherty | Gen. Paul K. Carlton |
| 1976 | | | Gen. Alexander M. Haig Jr. | Adm. Maurice F. Weisner | Gen. Daniel James Jr. | Lt. Gen. Dennis P. McAuliffe | Adm. Isaac C. Kidd Jr. | Gen. John J. Hennessey | | Gen. Russell E. Dougherty | |
| 1976 | | | Gen. Alexander M. Haig Jr. | Adm. Noel A. M. Gayler | Gen. Daniel James Jr. | Lt. Gen. Dennis P. McAuliffe | Adm. Isaac C. Kidd Jr. | Gen. John J. Hennessey | | Gen. Russell E. Dougherty | |
| 1975 | | | Gen. Alexander M. Haig Jr. | Adm. Noel A. M. Gayler | Gen. Daniel James Jr. | Lt. Gen. Dennis P. McAuliffe | Adm. Isaac C. Kidd Jr. | Gen. John J. Hennessey | | Gen. Russell E. Dougherty | |
| 1975 | | | Gen. Alexander M. Haig Jr. | Adm. Noel A. M. Gayler | Continental Air Defense Command | Lt. Gen. Dennis P. McAuliffe | Adm. Isaac C. Kidd Jr. | Gen. John J. Hennessey | Alaskan Command | Gen. Russell E. Dougherty | |
| 1975 | | | Gen. Alexander M. Haig Jr. | Adm. Noel A. M. Gayler | Gen. Lucius D. Clay Jr. | Gen. William B. Rosson | Adm. Ralph W. Cousins | Gen. John J. Hennessey | Lt. Gen. James E. Hill | Gen. Russell E. Dougherty | |
| 1974 | | | Gen. Andrew J. Goodpaster | Adm. Noel A. M. Gayler | Gen. Lucius D. Clay Jr. | Gen. William B. Rosson | Adm. Ralph W. Cousins | Gen. Bruce Palmer Jr. | Lt. Gen. James E. Hill | Gen. Russell E. Dougherty | |
| 1974 | | | Gen. Andrew J. Goodpaster | Adm. Noel A. M. Gayler | Gen. Lucius D. Clay Jr. | Gen. William B. Rosson | Adm. Ralph W. Cousins | Gen. Bruce Palmer Jr. | Lt. Gen. James C. Sherrill | Gen. Russell E. Dougherty | |
| 1974 | | | Gen. Andrew J. Goodpaster | Adm. Noel A. M. Gayler | Gen. Lucius D. Clay Jr. | Gen. William B. Rosson | Adm. Ralph W. Cousins | Gen. Bruce Palmer Jr. | Lt. Gen. James C. Sherrill | Gen. John C. Meyer | |
| 1973 | | | Gen. Andrew J. Goodpaster | Adm. Noel A. M. Gayler | Gen. Lucius D. Clay Jr. | Gen. William B. Rosson | Adm. Ralph W. Cousins | Gen. Bruce Palmer Jr. | Lt. Gen. James C. Sherrill | Gen. John C. Meyer | |
| 1973 | | | Gen. Andrew J. Goodpaster | Adm. Noel A. M. Gayler | Gen. Seth J. McKee | Gen. William B. Rosson | Adm. Ralph W. Cousins | Gen. Bruce Palmer Jr. | Lt. Gen. James C. Sherrill | Gen. John C. Meyer | |
| 1972 | | | Gen. Andrew J. Goodpaster | Adm. Noel A. M. Gayler | Gen. Seth J. McKee | Gen. George V. Underwood Jr. | Adm. Ralph W. Cousins | Gen. John L. Throckmorton | Lt. Gen. James C. Sherrill | Gen. John C. Meyer | |
| 1972 | | | Gen. Andrew J. Goodpaster | Adm. John S. McCain Jr. | Gen. Seth J. McKee | Gen. George V. Underwood Jr. | Adm. Charles K. Duncan | Gen. John L. Throckmorton | Lt. Gen. James C. Sherrill | Gen. John C. Meyer | |
| 1972 | | | Gen. Andrew J. Goodpaster | Adm. John S. McCain Jr. | Gen. Seth J. McKee | Gen. George V. Underwood Jr. | Adm. Charles K. Duncan | Gen. John L. Throckmorton | Lt. Gen. Robert G. Ruegg | Gen. John C. Meyer | |
| 1972 | | | Gen. Andrew J. Goodpaster | Adm. John S. McCain Jr. | Gen. Seth J. McKee | Gen. George V. Underwood Jr. | Adm. Charles K. Duncan | Gen. John L. Throckmorton | Lt. Gen. Robert G. Ruegg | Gen. Bruce K. Holloway | |
| 1971 | | | Gen. Andrew J. Goodpaster | Adm. John S. McCain Jr. | Gen. Seth J. McKee | Gen. George V. Underwood Jr. | Adm. Charles K. Duncan | Strike Command | Lt. Gen. Robert G. Ruegg | Gen. Bruce K. Holloway | |
| 1971 | | | Gen. Andrew J. Goodpaster | Adm. John S. McCain Jr. | Gen. Seth J. McKee | Gen. George R. Mather | Adm. Charles K. Duncan | Gen. John L. Throckmorton | Lt. Gen. Robert G. Ruegg | Gen. Bruce K. Holloway | |
| 1970 | | | Gen. Andrew J. Goodpaster | Adm. John S. McCain Jr. | Gen. Seth J. McKee | Gen. George R. Mather | Adm. Charles K. Duncan | Gen. John L. Throckmorton | Lt. Gen. Robert G. Ruegg | Gen. Bruce K. Holloway | |
| 1970 | | | Gen. Andrew J. Goodpaster | Adm. John S. McCain Jr. | Gen. Seth J. McKee | Gen. George R. Mather | Adm. Ephraim P. Holmes | Gen. John L. Throckmorton | Lt. Gen. Robert G. Ruegg | Gen. Bruce K. Holloway | |
| 1969 | | | Gen. Andrew J. Goodpaster | Adm. John S. McCain Jr. | Gen. Seth J. McKee | Gen. George R. Mather | Adm. Ephraim P. Holmes | Gen. John L. Throckmorton | Lt. Gen. Robert G. Ruegg | Gen. Bruce K. Holloway | |
| 1969 | | | Gen. Lyman L. Lemnitzer | Adm. John S. McCain Jr. | Gen. Raymond J. Reeves | Gen. George R. Mather | Adm. Ephraim P. Holmes | Gen. Theodore J. Conway | Lt. Gen. Robert A. Breitweiser | Gen. Bruce K. Holloway | |
| 1969 | | | Gen. Lyman L. Lemnitzer | Adm. John S. McCain Jr. | Gen. Raymond J. Reeves | Gen. Robert W. Porter Jr. | Adm. Ephraim P. Holmes | Gen. Theodore J. Conway | Lt. Gen. Robert A. Breitweiser | Gen. Bruce K. Holloway | |
| 1968 | | | Gen. Lyman L. Lemnitzer | Adm. John S. McCain Jr. | Gen. Raymond J. Reeves | Gen. Robert W. Porter Jr. | Adm. Ephraim P. Holmes | Gen. Theodore J. Conway | Lt. Gen. Robert A. Breitweiser | Gen. Bruce K. Holloway | |
| 1968 | | | Gen. Lyman L. Lemnitzer | Adm. U. S. Grant Sharp Jr. | Gen. Raymond J. Reeves | Gen. Robert W. Porter Jr. | Adm. Ephraim P. Holmes | Gen. Theodore J. Conway | Lt. Gen. Robert A. Breitweiser | Gen. Joseph J. Nazzaro | |
| 1967 | | | Gen. Lyman L. Lemnitzer | Adm. U. S. Grant Sharp Jr. | Gen. Raymond J. Reeves | Gen. Robert W. Porter Jr. | Adm. Ephraim P. Holmes | Gen. Theodore J. Conway | Lt. Gen. Robert A. Breitweiser | Gen. Joseph J. Nazzaro | |
| 1967 | | | Gen. Lyman L. Lemnitzer | Adm. U. S. Grant Sharp Jr. | Gen. Raymond J. Reeves | Gen. Robert W. Porter Jr. | Adm. Thomas H. Moorer | Gen. Theodore J. Conway | Lt. Gen. Glen R. Birchard | Gen. Joseph J. Nazzaro | |
| 1966 | | | Gen. Lyman L. Lemnitzer | Adm. U. S. Grant Sharp Jr. | Gen. Raymond J. Reeves | Gen. Robert W. Porter Jr. | Adm. Thomas H. Moorer | Gen. Theodore J. Conway | Lt. Gen. Glen R. Birchard | Gen. John D. Ryan | |
| 1966 | | | Gen. Lyman L. Lemnitzer | Adm. U. S. Grant Sharp Jr. | Gen. Raymond J. Reeves | Gen. Robert W. Porter Jr. | Adm. Thomas H. Moorer | Gen. Paul D. Adams | Lt. Gen. Glen R. Birchard | Gen. John D. Ryan | |
| 1966 | | | Gen. Lyman L. Lemnitzer | Adm. U. S. Grant Sharp Jr. | Gen. Dean C. Strother | Gen. Robert W. Porter Jr. | Adm. Thomas H. Moorer | Gen. Paul D. Adams | Lt. Gen. Raymond J. Reeves | Gen. John D. Ryan | |
| 1965 | | | Gen. Lyman L. Lemnitzer | Adm. U. S. Grant Sharp Jr. | Gen. Dean C. Strother | Gen. Robert W. Porter Jr. | Adm. Thomas H. Moorer | Gen. Paul D. Adams | Lt. Gen. Raymond J. Reeves | Gen. John D. Ryan | |
| 1965 | | | Gen. Lyman L. Lemnitzer | Adm. U. S. Grant Sharp Jr. | Gen. John K. Gerhart | Gen. Andrew P. O'Meara | Adm. Harold P. Smith | Gen. Paul D. Adams | Lt. Gen. Raymond J. Reeves | Gen. John D. Ryan | |
| 1964 | | | Gen. Lyman L. Lemnitzer | Adm. U. S. Grant Sharp Jr. | Gen. John K. Gerhart | Gen. Andrew P. O'Meara | Adm. Harold P. Smith | Gen. Paul D. Adams | Lt. Gen. Raymond J. Reeves | Gen. Thomas S. Power | |
| 1964 | | | Gen. Lyman L. Lemnitzer | Adm. Harry D. Felt | Gen. John K. Gerhart | Gen. Andrew P. O'Meara | Adm. Harold P. Smith | Gen. Paul D. Adams | Lt. Gen. Raymond J. Reeves | Gen. Thomas S. Power | |
| 1964 | | Naval Forces, Eastern Atlantic and Mediterranean | Gen. Lyman L. Lemnitzer | Adm. Harry D. Felt | Gen. John K. Gerhart | Gen. Andrew P. O'Meara | Adm. Harold P. Smith | Gen. Paul D. Adams | Lt. Gen. Raymond J. Reeves | Gen. Thomas S. Power | |
| 1963 | | Adm. Charles D. Griffin | Gen. Lyman L. Lemnitzer | Adm. Harry D. Felt | Gen. John K. Gerhart | Gen. Andrew P. O'Meara | Adm. Harold P. Smith | Gen. Paul D. Adams | Lt. Gen. Raymond J. Reeves | Gen. Thomas S. Power | |
| 1963 | | Adm. David L. McDonald | Gen. Lyman L. Lemnitzer | Adm. Harry D. Felt | Gen. John K. Gerhart | Caribbean Command | Adm. Harold P. Smith | Gen. Paul D. Adams | Lt. Gen. George W. Mundy | Gen. Thomas S. Power | |
| 1963 | | Adm. Harold P. Smith | Gen. Lyman L. Lemnitzer | Adm. Harry D. Felt | Gen. John K. Gerhart | Lt. Gen. Andrew P. O'Meara | Adm. Robert L. Dennison | Gen. Paul D. Adams | Lt. Gen. George W. Mundy | Gen. Thomas S. Power | |
| 1962 | | Adm. Harold P. Smith | Gen. Lyman L. Lemnitzer | Adm. Harry D. Felt | Gen. John K. Gerhart | Lt. Gen. Andrew P. O'Meara | Adm. Robert L. Dennison | Gen. Paul D. Adams | Lt. Gen. George W. Mundy | Gen. Thomas S. Power | |
| 1962 | | Adm. Harold P. Smith | Gen. Lauris Norstad | Adm. Harry D. Felt | Gen. John K. Gerhart | Lt. Gen. Andrew P. O'Meara | Adm. Robert L. Dennison | Gen. Paul D. Adams | Lt. Gen. George W. Mundy | Gen. Thomas S. Power | |
| 1962 | | Adm. Harold P. Smith | Gen. Lauris Norstad | Adm. Harry D. Felt | Gen. Laurence S. Kuter | Lt. Gen. Andrew P. O'Meara | Adm. Robert L. Dennison | Gen. Paul D. Adams | Lt. Gen. George W. Mundy | Gen. Thomas S. Power | |
| 1961 | | Adm. Harold P. Smith | Gen. Lauris Norstad | Adm. Harry D. Felt | Gen. Laurence S. Kuter | Lt. Gen. Andrew P. O'Meara | Adm. Robert L. Dennison | | Lt. Gen. George W. Mundy | Gen. Thomas S. Power | |
| 1961 | | Adm. Harold P. Smith | Gen. Lauris Norstad | Adm. Harry D. Felt | Gen. Laurence S. Kuter | Lt. Gen. Andrew P. O'Meara | Adm. Robert L. Dennison | | Lt. Gen. Frank A. Armstrong Jr. | Gen. Thomas S. Power | |
| 1960 | | Adm. Harold P. Smith | Gen. Lauris Norstad | Adm. Harry D. Felt | Gen. Laurence S. Kuter | Lt. Gen. Robert F. Sink | Adm. Robert L. Dennison | | Lt. Gen. Frank A. Armstrong Jr. | Gen. Thomas S. Power | |
| 1960 | | Adm. Harold P. Smith | Gen. Lauris Norstad | Adm. Harry D. Felt | Gen. Laurence S. Kuter | Lt. Gen. Ridgely Gaither | Adm. Robert L. Dennison | | Lt. Gen. Frank A. Armstrong Jr. | Gen. Thomas S. Power | |
| 1960 | | Adm. Robert L. Dennison | Gen. Lauris Norstad | Adm. Harry D. Felt | Gen. Laurence S. Kuter | Lt. Gen. Ridgely Gaither | Adm. Jerauld Wright | | Lt. Gen. Frank A. Armstrong Jr. | Gen. Thomas S. Power | |
| 1959 | | Adm. Robert L. Dennison | Gen. Lauris Norstad | Adm. Harry D. Felt | Gen. Laurence S. Kuter | Lt. Gen. Ridgely Gaither | Adm. Jerauld Wright | | Lt. Gen. Frank A. Armstrong Jr. | Gen. Thomas S. Power | |
| 1959 | | Adm. Robert L. Dennison | Gen. Lauris Norstad | Adm. Harry D. Felt | Gen. Earle E. Partridge | Lt. Gen. Ridgely Gaither | Adm. Jerauld Wright | | Lt. Gen. Frank A. Armstrong Jr. | Gen. Thomas S. Power | |
| 1959 | | Adm. James L. Holloway Jr. | Gen. Lauris Norstad | Adm. Harry D. Felt | Gen. Earle E. Partridge | Lt. Gen. Ridgely Gaither | Adm. Jerauld Wright | | Lt. Gen. Frank A. Armstrong Jr. | Gen. Thomas S. Power | |
| 1958 | | Adm. James L. Holloway Jr. | Gen. Lauris Norstad | Adm. Harry D. Felt | Gen. Earle E. Partridge | Lt. Gen. Ridgely Gaither | Adm. Jerauld Wright | | Lt. Gen. Frank A. Armstrong Jr. | Gen. Thomas S. Power | |
| 1958 | | Adm. James L. Holloway Jr. | Gen. Lauris Norstad | Adm. Felix B. Stump | Gen. Earle E. Partridge | Lt. Gen. Ridgely Gaither | Adm. Jerauld Wright | | Lt. Gen. Frank A. Armstrong Jr. | Gen. Thomas S. Power | |
| 1958 | | Adm. Walter F. Boone | Gen. Lauris Norstad | Adm. Felix B. Stump | Gen. Earle E. Partridge | Lt. Gen. Robert M. Montague | Adm. Jerauld Wright | | Lt. Gen. Frank A. Armstrong Jr. | Gen. Thomas S. Power | |
| 1957 | | Adm. Walter F. Boone | Gen. Lauris Norstad | Adm. Felix B. Stump | Gen. Earle E. Partridge | Lt. Gen. Robert M. Montague | Adm. Jerauld Wright | | Lt. Gen. Frank A. Armstrong Jr. | Gen. Thomas S. Power | |
| 1957 | | Adm. Walter F. Boone | Gen. Lauris Norstad | Adm. Felix B. Stump | Gen. Earle E. Partridge | Lt. Gen. Robert M. Montague | Adm. Jerauld Wright | Far East Command | Lt. Gen. Frank A. Armstrong Jr. | Gen. Thomas S. Power | |
| 1957 | | Adm. Walter F. Boone | Gen. Lauris Norstad | Adm. Felix B. Stump | Gen. Earle E. Partridge | Lt. Gen. Robert M. Montague | Adm. Jerauld Wright | Gen. Lyman L. Lemnitzer | Lt. Gen. Frank A. Armstrong Jr. | Gen. Curtis E. LeMay | |
| 1956 | | Adm. Walter F. Boone | Gen. Alfred M. Gruenther | Adm. Felix B. Stump | Gen. Earle E. Partridge | Lt. Gen. William K. Harrison Jr. | Adm. Jerauld Wright | Gen. Lyman L. Lemnitzer | Lt. Gen. Frank A. Armstrong Jr. | Gen. Curtis E. LeMay | Northeast Command |
| 1956 | Air Forces, Europe | Adm. Walter F. Boone | Gen. Alfred M. Gruenther | Adm. Felix B. Stump | Gen. Earle E. Partridge | Lt. Gen. William K. Harrison Jr. | Adm. Jerauld Wright | Gen. Lyman L. Lemnitzer | Lt. Gen. Joseph H. Atkinson | Gen. Curtis E. LeMay | Lt. Gen. Glenn O. Barcus |
| 1956 | Lt. Gen. William H. Tunner | Adm. John H. Cassady | Gen. Alfred M. Gruenther | Adm. Felix B. Stump | Gen. Earle E. Partridge | Lt. Gen. William K. Harrison Jr. | Adm. Jerauld Wright | Gen. Lyman L. Lemnitzer | Lt. Gen. Joseph H. Atkinson | Gen. Curtis E. LeMay | Lt. Gen. Glenn O. Barcus |
| 1955 | Lt. Gen. William H. Tunner | Adm. John H. Cassady | Gen. Alfred M. Gruenther | Adm. Felix B. Stump | Gen. Earle E. Partridge | Lt. Gen. William K. Harrison Jr. | Adm. Jerauld Wright | Gen. Lyman L. Lemnitzer | Lt. Gen. Joseph H. Atkinson | Gen. Curtis E. LeMay | Lt. Gen. Glenn O. Barcus |
| 1955 | Lt. Gen. William H. Tunner | Adm. John H. Cassady | Gen. Alfred M. Gruenther | Adm. Felix B. Stump | Gen. Benjamin W. Chidlaw | Lt. Gen. William K. Harrison Jr. | Adm. Jerauld Wright | Gen. Maxwell D. Taylor | Lt. Gen. Joseph H. Atkinson | Gen. Curtis E. LeMay | Lt. Gen. Glenn O. Barcus |
| 1955 | Lt. Gen. William H. Tunner | Adm. John H. Cassady | Gen. Alfred M. Gruenther | Adm. Felix B. Stump | Gen. Benjamin W. Chidlaw | Lt. Gen. William K. Harrison Jr. | Adm. Jerauld Wright | Gen. John E. Hull | Lt. Gen. Joseph H. Atkinson | Gen. Curtis E. LeMay | Lt. Gen. Glenn O. Barcus |
| 1954 | Lt. Gen. William H. Tunner | Adm. John H. Cassady | Gen. Alfred M. Gruenther | Adm. Felix B. Stump | Gen. Benjamin W. Chidlaw | Lt. Gen. William K. Harrison Jr. | Adm. Jerauld Wright | Gen. John E. Hull | Lt. Gen. Joseph H. Atkinson | Gen. Curtis E. LeMay | Lt. Gen. Glenn O. Barcus |
| 1954 | Lt. Gen. William H. Tunner | Adm. John H. Cassady | Gen. Alfred M. Gruenther | Adm. Felix B. Stump | | Lt. Gen. Horace L. McBride | Adm. Jerauld Wright | Gen. John E. Hull | Lt. Gen. Joseph H. Atkinson | Gen. Curtis E. LeMay | Lt. Gen. Charles T. Myers |
| 1954 | Lt. Gen. William H. Tunner | Vice Adm. Jerauld Wright | Gen. Alfred M. Gruenther | Adm. Felix B. Stump | | Lt. Gen. Horace L. McBride | Adm. Lynde D. McCormick | Gen. John E. Hull | Lt. Gen. Joseph H. Atkinson | Gen. Curtis E. LeMay | Lt. Gen. Charles T. Myers |
| 1953 | Lt. Gen. William H. Tunner | Vice Adm. Jerauld Wright | Gen. Alfred M. Gruenther | Adm. Felix B. Stump | | Lt. Gen. Horace L. McBride | Adm. Lynde D. McCormick | Gen. John E. Hull | Lt. Gen. Joseph H. Atkinson | Gen. Curtis E. LeMay | Lt. Gen. Charles T. Myers |
| 1953 | Lt. Gen. William H. Tunner | Vice Adm. Jerauld Wright | Gen. Alfred M. Gruenther | Adm. Felix B. Stump | | Lt. Gen. Horace L. McBride | Adm. Lynde D. McCormick | Gen. Mark W. Clark | Lt. Gen. Joseph H. Atkinson | Gen. Curtis E. LeMay | Lt. Gen. Charles T. Myers |
| 1953 | Gen. Lauris Norstad | Vice Adm. Jerauld Wright | Gen. Matthew B. Ridgway | Adm. Arthur W. Radford | | Lt. Gen. Horace L. McBride | Adm. Lynde D. McCormick | Gen. Mark W. Clark | Lt. Gen. Joseph H. Atkinson | Gen. Curtis E. LeMay | Lt. Gen. Charles T. Myers |
| 1953 | Gen. Lauris Norstad | Vice Adm. Jerauld Wright | Gen. Matthew B. Ridgway | Adm. Arthur W. Radford | | Lt. Gen. Horace L. McBride | Adm. Lynde D. McCormick | Gen. Mark W. Clark | Lt. Gen. William E. Kepner | Gen. Curtis E. LeMay | Lt. Gen. Charles T. Myers |
| 1952 | Gen. Lauris Norstad | Vice Adm. Jerauld Wright | Gen. Matthew B. Ridgway | Adm. Arthur W. Radford | | Lt. Gen. Horace L. McBride | Adm. Lynde D. McCormick | Gen. Mark W. Clark | Lt. Gen. William E. Kepner | Gen. Curtis E. LeMay | Lt. Gen. Charles T. Myers |
| 1952 | Gen. Lauris Norstad | Vice Adm. Jerauld Wright | European Command | Adm. Arthur W. Radford | | Lt. Gen. Horace L. McBride | Adm. Lynde D. McCormick | Gen. Mark W. Clark | Lt. Gen. William E. Kepner | Gen. Curtis E. LeMay | Lt. Gen. Charles T. Myers |
| 1952 | Lt. Gen. Lauris Norstad | Adm. Robert B. Carney | Gen. Thomas T. Handy | Adm. Arthur W. Radford | | Lt. Gen. Horace L. McBride | Adm. Lynde D. McCormick | Gen. Matthew B. Ridgway | Lt. Gen. William E. Kepner | Gen. Curtis E. LeMay | Maj. Gen. Charles T. Myers |
| 1952 | Lt. Gen. Lauris Norstad | Adm. Robert B. Carney | Gen. Thomas T. Handy | Adm. Arthur W. Radford | | Lt. Gen. William H. H. Morris Jr. | Adm. Lynde D. McCormick | Gen. Matthew B. Ridgway | Lt. Gen. William E. Kepner | Gen. Curtis E. LeMay | Maj. Gen. Lyman P. Whitten |
| 1951 | Lt. Gen. Lauris Norstad | Adm. Robert B. Carney | Gen. Thomas T. Handy | Adm. Arthur W. Radford | | Lt. Gen. William H. H. Morris Jr. | Adm. Lynde D. McCormick | Gen. Matthew B. Ridgway | Lt. Gen. William E. Kepner | Gen. Curtis E. LeMay | Maj. Gen. Lyman P. Whitten |
| 1951 | Lt. Gen. Lauris Norstad | Adm. Robert B. Carney | Gen. Thomas T. Handy | Adm. Arthur W. Radford | | Lt. Gen. William H. H. Morris Jr. | Adm. Lynde D. McCormick | Gen. Matthew B. Ridgway | Lt. Gen. William E. Kepner | Lt. Gen. Curtis E. LeMay | Maj. Gen. Lyman P. Whitten |
| 1951 | Lt. Gen. Lauris Norstad | Adm. Robert B. Carney | Gen. Thomas T. Handy | Adm. Arthur W. Radford | | Lt. Gen. William H. H. Morris Jr. | Adm. William M. Fechteler | Gen. Matthew B. Ridgway | Lt. Gen. William E. Kepner | Lt. Gen. Curtis E. LeMay | Maj. Gen. Lyman P. Whitten |
| 1951 | Lt. Gen. Lauris Norstad | Adm. Robert B. Carney | Gen. Thomas T. Handy | Adm. Arthur W. Radford | | Lt. Gen. William H. H. Morris Jr. | Adm. William M. Fechteler | Gen. of the Army Douglas MacArthur | Lt. Gen. William E. Kepner | Lt. Gen. Curtis E. LeMay | Maj. Gen. Lyman P. Whitten |
| 1950 | | Adm. Robert B. Carney | Gen. Thomas T. Handy | Adm. Arthur W. Radford | | Lt. Gen. William H. H. Morris Jr. | Adm. William M. Fechteler | Gen. of the Army Douglas MacArthur | Lt. Gen. William E. Kepner | Lt. Gen. Curtis E. LeMay | Maj. Gen. Lyman P. Whitten |
| 1950 | | Adm. Richard L. Conolly | Gen. Thomas T. Handy | Adm. Arthur W. Radford | | Lt. Gen. William H. H. Morris Jr. | Adm. William M. Fechteler | Gen. of the Army Douglas MacArthur | Lt. Gen. William E. Kepner | Lt. Gen. Curtis E. LeMay | |
| 1950 | | Adm. Richard L. Conolly | Gen. Thomas T. Handy | Adm. Arthur W. Radford | | Lt. Gen. William H. H. Morris Jr. | Adm. William M. Fechteler | Gen. of the Army Douglas MacArthur | Lt. Gen. Nathan F. Twining | Lt. Gen. Curtis E. LeMay | |
| 1949 | | Adm. Richard L. Conolly | Gen. Thomas T. Handy | Adm. Arthur W. Radford | | Lt. Gen. William H. H. Morris Jr. | Adm. William H. P. Blandy | Gen. of the Army Douglas MacArthur | Lt. Gen. Nathan F. Twining | Lt. Gen. Curtis E. LeMay | |
| 1949 | | Adm. Richard L. Conolly | Gen. Lucius D. Clay | Adm. Arthur W. Radford | | Lt. Gen. Matthew B. Ridgway | Adm. William H. P. Blandy | Gen. of the Army Douglas MacArthur | Lt. Gen. Nathan F. Twining | Lt. Gen. Curtis E. LeMay | |
| 1949 | | Adm. Richard L. Conolly | Gen. Lucius D. Clay | Adm. DeWitt C. Ramsey | | Lt. Gen. Matthew B. Ridgway | Adm. William H. P. Blandy | Gen. of the Army Douglas MacArthur | Lt. Gen. Nathan F. Twining | Lt. Gen. Curtis E. LeMay | |
| 1948 | | Adm. Richard L. Conolly | Gen. Lucius D. Clay | Adm. DeWitt C. Ramsey | | Lt. Gen. Matthew B. Ridgway | Adm. William H. P. Blandy | Gen. of the Army Douglas MacArthur | Lt. Gen. Nathan F. Twining | Lt. Gen. Curtis E. LeMay | |
| 1948 | | Adm. Richard L. Conolly | Gen. Lucius D. Clay | Adm. DeWitt C. Ramsey | | Lt. Gen. Matthew B. Ridgway | Adm. William H. P. Blandy | Gen. of the Army Douglas MacArthur | Lt. Gen. Nathan F. Twining | Gen. George C. Kenney | |
| 1948 | | Adm. Richard L. Conolly | Gen. Lucius D. Clay | Adm. DeWitt C. Ramsey | | Lt. Gen. Willis D. Crittenberger | Adm. William H. P. Blandy | Gen. of the Army Douglas MacArthur | Lt. Gen. Nathan F. Twining | Gen. George C. Kenney | |
| 1948 | | Adm. Richard L. Conolly | Gen. Lucius D. Clay | Adm. DeWitt C. Ramsey | | Lt. Gen. Willis D. Crittenberger | Atlantic Fleet | Gen. of the Army Douglas MacArthur | Lt. Gen. Nathan F. Twining | Gen. George C. Kenney | |
| 1947 | | Adm. Richard L. Conolly | Gen. Lucius D. Clay | Adm. Louis E. Denfeld | | Lt. Gen. Willis D. Crittenberger | Adm. William H. P. Blandy | Gen. of the Army Douglas MacArthur | Lt. Gen. Nathan F. Twining | Gen. George C. Kenney | |
| 1947 | | | Gen. Lucius D. Clay | Adm. Louis E. Denfeld | | | | Gen. of the Army Douglas MacArthur | Maj. Gen. Howard A. Craig | Gen. George C. Kenney | |
| 1947 | | | | Adm. John H. Towers | | | | Gen. of the Army Douglas MacArthur | Maj. Gen. Howard A. Craig | Gen. George C. Kenney | |
