= Airlift/Tanker Association =

- Abbreviation: A/TA
- Formation: 1969; 57 years ago
- Type: 501(c)(3) organization
- Location: Chattanooga, Tennessee
- Website: www.atalink.org
- Formerly called: Airlift Association (1968–1991)

The Airlift/Tanker Association (A/TA), formerly the Airlift Association, is an American non-profit organization that supports the United States Air Force's airlift and air mobility operations. The A/TA is a partner of the Air Mobility Command.

== History ==
In July 1969, members of the 834th Airlift Division who served in the Vietnam War convened for a reunion in Las Vegas, where they formed the Airlift Association. The association was chartered in 1975. It later formed a partnership with the Air Force to train and develop airmen.

The association was renamed the Airlift/Tanker Association in 1992.

The A/TA's leadership included personnel like Air Force general Duane H. Cassidy, who served as Chairman of the Board of Officers from 1999 to 2003.

The headquarters are located in Chattanooga, Tennessee. It is a 501(c)(3) organization.

== Activities ==
The association is structured into chapters, which are typically formed on or adjacent to military bases. The chapter needs at least 20 A/TA members and a drafted charter that is presented to the association before it can be approved. Chapters include Robins Air Force Base that was formed in 1992, the Huyser Chapter at Scott Air Force Base named after Robert E. Huyser, and overseas chapters like Luftbrücke and Berlin for air crew who flew in the Berlin Airlift.

Events vary between chapters. Some collaborate with other societies for charity events on base, such as a golf tournament on Dyess Air Force Base between the A/TA's Big Country chapter and Meals on Wheels Plus in Abilene in 1987. Other chapters own and operate historic aircraft like a Douglas DC-4 owned by the Berlin Airlift Association and a Fairchild C-119 Flying Boxcar on display at Pope Field after its chapter raised money to acquire the plane from the Florence Air & Missile Museum in 1988.

The A/TA hosts the Airlift/Tanker Association Symposium annually in partnership with the Air Mobility Command. Other activities by the association included sponsoring the Air Force Ball in 2012.

In 2023, the A/TA held the annual four-day Professional Military Education Convention & Symposium, which includes 36 educational seminars, individual and organizational awards for educational, skills, valor and leadership recognition.

The 56th annual Airlift/Tanker Association Symposium was held from 31 October to 3 November 2024 in Grapevine, Texas and was attended by Air Force and Joint Force leaders, industry partners and more than 1,000 Airmen. At the event, Air Mobility Command and the A/TA provided recognition to 28 individuals, two wings and one group. The Lt. Gen. James E. Sherrard III Award was presented to the 439th Airlift Wing, the Abilene Trophy was presented to the Leadership Council of Southwestern Illinois, and the Tampa Bay Trophy was presented to Chairman Mark Kern.

The A/TA publishes a serial publication called the Airlift/Tanker Quarterly.

== Hall of Fame ==
The A/TA maintains a Hall of Fame, which has 37 inductees as of 2024. The Hall of Fame was founded in 1989.

Those enshrined have busts placed at Scott AFB. The sculptures are part of the Airlift Association Hall of Fame Memorial and Walk of Fame, which opened in 1991 as part of the larger Berlin Airlift Memorial Garden. It features a three-ton, eight-foot-by-four-foot slab of the Berlin Wall that was delivered by the association's German chapter Luftbrücke. Founding members of the A/TA also receive busts.

Year	Inductee	Rank	Ref
2026	No inductee		
2025	John T. Carney	Colonel	
2024	Paul K. Carlton	General (Ret.)	
2023	Civil Reserve Air Fleet	N/A	
2022	No inductee		
2021	Donald D. Brown	Major General	
2020	Lawrence Lane	Colonel (Ret.)	
2019	Aerial port squadrons	N/A	
2018	Walter Kross	General (Ret.)	
2017	Paul L. Williams	Major General (Ret.)	
2016	Alan Cobham	N/A	
2015	The C-17A Pathfinder Loadmasters (Note: Chief Master Sgts. William Cannon, Marion Fincher, James Lis, Mark Smith, Michael Welch, Theodore Venturini (Ret.))	N/A	
2014	Earl B. Young	Colonel (Ret.)	
2013	Ronald R. Fogleman	General	
2012	William H. Pitsenbarger	Staff Sergeant	
2011	Thomas M. Ryan Jr.	Major General (Ret.)	
2009	The Pioneers of Aerial Refueling (Note: Crews responsible for the first American aerial refueling flights in 1923 and 1929: 1st Lts. Virgil Hine and Frank W. Seifert (1923); Capt. Robert G Erwin, 1st Lt. Oliver R. McNeel, Capt. Lowell H. Smith, and 1st Lt. John Paul Richter (1929))	N/A	
2008	Robert B. Patterson	Major General (Ret.)	
2007	Aeromedical Evacuation Legacy Team (Note: Lt. Paul K. Carlton Jr. (Ret.), Col. Regine Aune (Ret.), Col. Bud Traylor (Ret.), Col. Bob Brannon (Ret.), Col. Jay Johannigman, Capt. Reba Tobiason (posthumous), Chief Master Sgt. Rodney Christa, and Master Sgt. Mark McElroy (Ret.))	N/A	
2006	Duane H. Cassidy	General (Ret.)	
2005	James I. Baginski	Major General (Ret.)	
2003	John F. Shea	N/A	
2002	Carl Spaatz	General	
2001	Roy W. Hooe	Master Sergeant	
2000	Winston P. Wilson	Major General	
1999	Gail Halvorsen	Colonel (Ret.)	
1998	John Levitow	Sergeant	
1997	Joe M. Jackson	Colonel	
1997	William G. Moore Jr.	General	
1996	Nancy Harkness Love	N/A	
1995	Joseph Smith	Lieutenant General	
1994	Robert E. Huyser	General	
1993	Ira C. Eaker	Lieutenant General	
1992	C. R. Smith	Major General	
1991	Harold L. George	Lieutenant General	
1990	Donald Wills Douglas Sr.	N/A	
1990	Laurence S. Kuter	General	
1989	William H. Tunner	Lieutenant General	
