= Robert E. Huyser =

United States Air Force general (1924–1997)

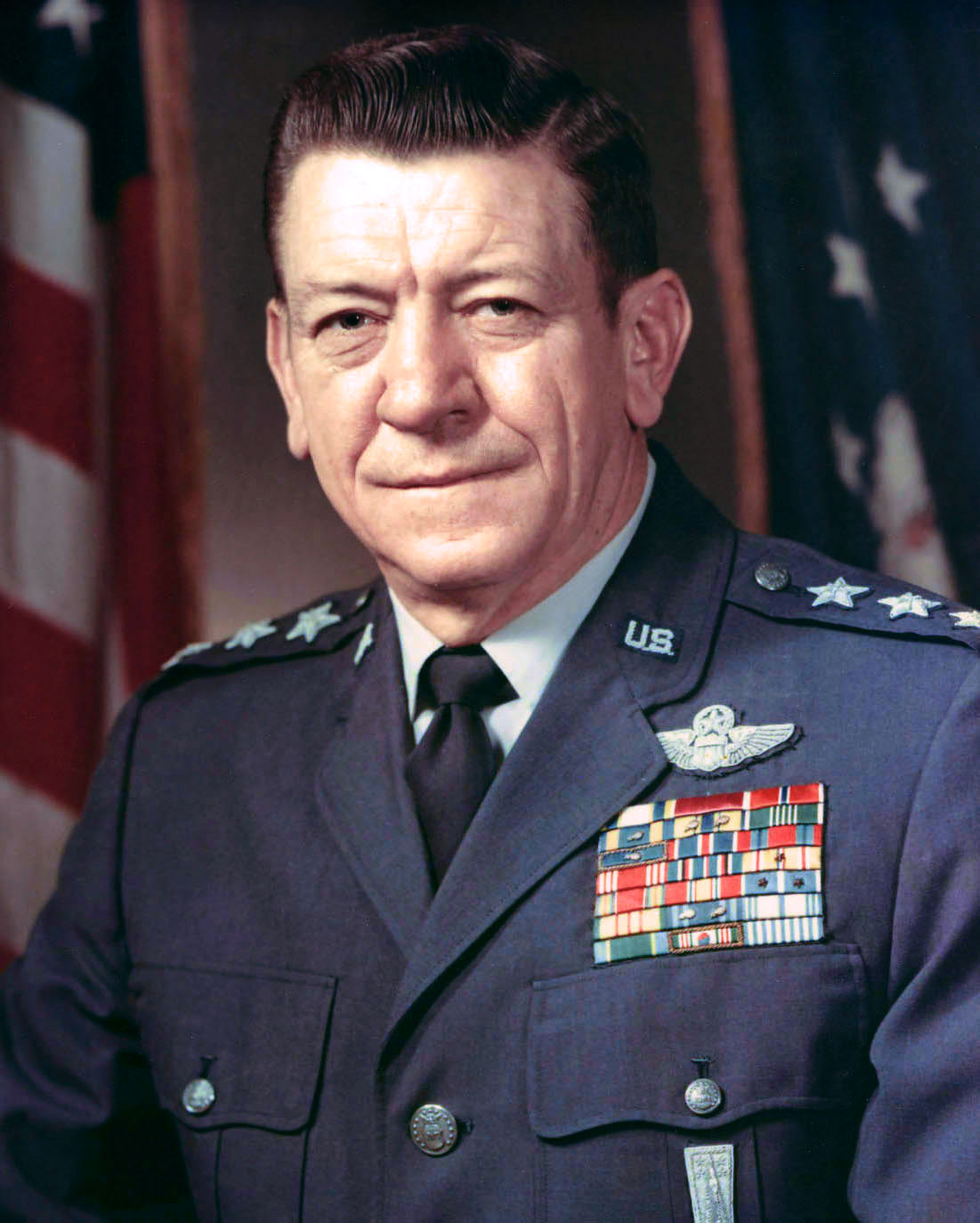
- Huyser in an undated portrait
- Born: Robert Ernest Huyser; June 14, 1924; Paonia, Colorado, US
- Died: September 22, 1997 (aged 73); Travis Air Force Base, California, US
- Burial place: Arlington National Cemetery
- Military career
- Allegiance: United States of America
- Branch: United States Air Force
- Service years: 1943–1981
- Rank: General
- Nickname: Dutch
- Commands: Military Airlift Command
- Conflicts: World War II; Korean War; Vietnam War
- Awards: Defense Distinguished Service Medal; Air Force Distinguished Service Medal (2); Legion of Merit; Bronze Star; Air Medal

Robert Ernest Huyser (June 14, 1924 – September 22, 1997) was a four-star general in the United States Air Force who served as Deputy Commander in Chief, United States European Command (DCINCEUR) from 1975 to 1979; and as Commander in Chief, Military Airlift Command (CINCMAC) from 1979 to 1981.

== Early life and education ==
Robert Ernest Huyser was born in 1924, in Paonia, Colorado, where he graduated from Paonia High School. He later attended Modesto Junior College in Modesto, California, and Ouachita College in Arkadelphia, Arkansas.

== Military career ==
Huyser was drafted into the United States Army in April 1943 and in 1944 entered the aviation cadet program. In September 1944 he graduated from flying school and received his pilot wings and commission as a second lieutenant.

During World War II he flew B-29 Superfortresses in the South West Pacific Area. In May 1945 he was assigned as a B-29 pilot at Clovis, New Mexico. From August 1946 to May 1947, Huyser was an aircraft commander in the 307th Bombardment Wing, MacDill Field, Florida. He next became an aircraft commander in the 93rd Bombardment Wing at Castle Air Force Base, California, and in 1950 was assigned to the wing staff as chief of training.

During the Korean War Huyser was assigned to the Far East Air Forces Bomber Command as chief, combat operations. During that period he flew combat missions in B-29s with the 98th Bombardment Wing.

He returned to the United States in September 1953 and was assigned as chief, Combat Crew Section, Headquarters Fifteenth Air Force, March Air Force Base, California. In February 1957 he became chief, Training Division, for the 92nd Bombardment Wing, Fairchild Air Force Base, Washington, and later was named director of operations.

Huyser returned to Headquarters Fifteenth Air Force in January 1959 as assistant chief and then as chief, Combat Operations Branch. In July 1960 he became chief, Operations Plans Division. He entered the Air War College at Maxwell Air Force Base, Alabama, in August 1962. After his graduation in July 1963, he served as chief, Concepts Branch, Operations Plans Division, Headquarters Strategic Air Command, Offutt Air Force Base, Nebraska.

In July 1966 he assumed duties as vice commander of the 454th Bombardment Wing at Columbus Air Force Base, Mississippi, and in December 1966 he assumed command of the 449th Bombardment Wing at Kincheloe Air Force Base, Michigan.

Huyser returned to Headquarters SAC in April 1968 and was assigned to the Office of the Deputy Chief of Staff, Operations, as director, command control, and in February 1970 he assumed duties as director of operations plans and chief, Single Integrated Operational Plans Division, Joint Strategic Target Planning Staff.

His principal involvement in the Vietnam War was administering the contingency war plans for SAC headquarters. He planned the B-52 missions, weaponeered the target boxes and executed the strikes. He also managed the SAC tanker support for the Southeast Asia area. He also flew B-52 combat missions over Vietnam and tanker support sorties out of Thailand.

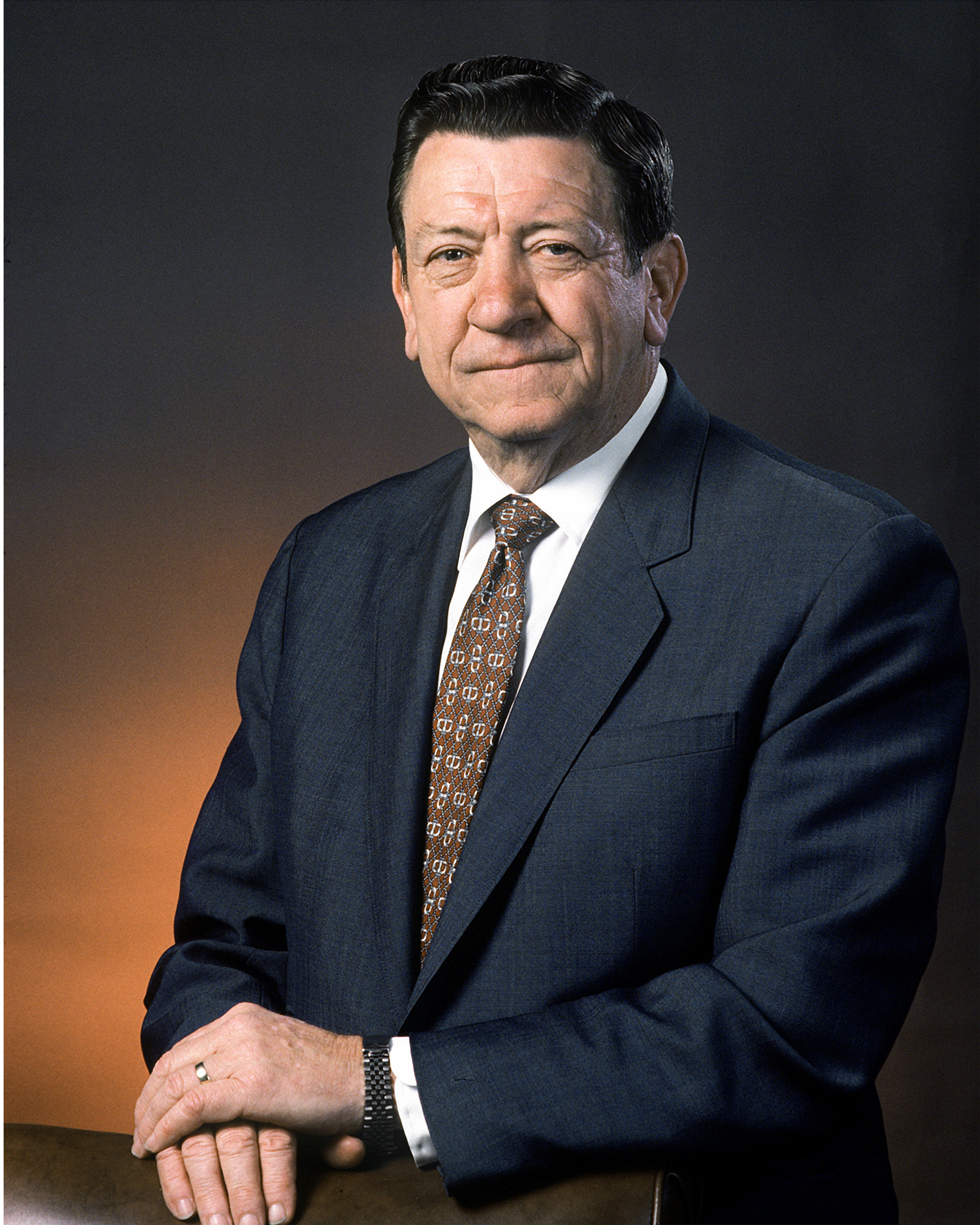
Robert E. Huyser in retirement

In June 1972 Huyser was assigned to Headquarters U.S. Air Force, Washington, D.C., in the Office of the Deputy Chief of Staff, Plans and Operations, as director of plans. In April 1973 he became deputy chief of staff, plans and operations. He participated in the decision-making processes that resulted in C-130 Hercules resources being assigned to the Military Airlift Command and the designation of the Military Airlift Command as the Department of Defense's third specified command.

Huyser become deputy commander in chief of the U.S. European Command, Stuttgart-Vaihingen, West Germany, in September 1975, where he was one of the major users of Military Airlift Command airlift support.

=== Iran ===
The President Jimmy Carter sent Huyser to Iran in January 1979, while the latter still was EUCOM deputy. Sources disagree on the nature of his mission. According to Carter, Huyser, and American sources, he attempted to stabilize Iran during the turbulent early stages of the Iranian Revolution. While the option of a pro-Shah military coup still was a possibility, Huyser met with Iranian Armed Forces leaders (but not the Shah), and established meetings between them and Khomeini allies, for the purpose of agreeing on Shapour Bakhtiar's transitional government. According to some supporters of the Shah, his goal was undercutting the Shah's government.

Shortly afterward, the Shah left Iran for exile and the Islamic Revolution took over the country. Huyser departed Iran on February 3, 1979, two days after Khomeini returned from exile in France and called for the expulsion of foreign military advisors. In his memoir Mission to Tehran, Huyser called the mission "one that started with desperation and disunity and ended in disaster," but praised the performance of U.S. personnel.

According to a newly released report by the US government, Huyser's main objective was to declare the US government's support for the military to prevent any possible coup of the army's frightened generals. Huyser also met with some opposition leaders like Mehdi Bazargan.

Huyser assumed command of the Military Airlift Command in June 1979, his last posting.

Huyser retired from the Air Force on July 1, 1981, and died September 22, 1997, at the David Grant Medical Center at Travis Air Force Base in Fairfield, California. He was buried at Arlington National Cemetery.

=== Work ===
Huyser published a book entitled Mission to Tehran in 1987.

== Awards and medals ==
Huyser was a command pilot and flew more than 5,000 hours in SAC bombers, nearly 2,000, hours in SAC tankers, about 1,400 hours in single engine jet aircraft and 1,500 hours in B-25, C-54, T-39 and various light aircraft.

His military decorations and awards include the Defense Distinguished Service Medal, Air Force Distinguished Service Medal with oak leaf cluster, Legion of Merit, Bronze Star, Defense Meritorious Service Medal, Air Medal, Joint Service Commendation Medal, Air Force Commendation Medal with two oak leaf clusters, Army Commendation Medal, Presidential Unit Citation emblem, Air Force Outstanding Unit Award ribbon, Small Arms Expert Marksmanship ribbon and Republic of Korea Presidential Unit Citation ribbon.

- Defense Distinguished Service Medal
- Distinguished Service Medal with oak leaf cluster
- Legion of Merit
- Bronze Star
- Defense Meritorious Service Medal
- Air Medal
- Joint Service Commendation Medal
- Air Force Commendation Medal with two oak leaf clusters
- Army Commendation Medal
- Army Presidential Unit Citation
- Air Force Outstanding Unit Award
- Small Arms Expert Marksmanship Ribbon
- Republic of Korea Presidential Unit Citation

In 1994 he was inducted into the Airlift/Tanker Association Hall of Fame.

In 1996 the family created the General Dutch Huyser Outstanding Aircrew Member Award which is presented by the Airlift/Tanker Association at their annual convention.

== Effective dates of promotion ==
Insignia	Rank	Date
	General	September 1, 1975
	Lieutenant general	November 1, 1973
	Major general	October 1, 1971
	Brigadier general	August 1, 1969
	Colonel	March 15, 1962
	Lieutenant colonel	April 19, 1956
	Major	December 21, 1951
	Captain	July 22, 1950
	First lieutenant	August 26, 1946
	Second lieutenant	September 8, 1944
