= Thomas M. Ryan Jr. =

United States Air Force general (1928–2024)

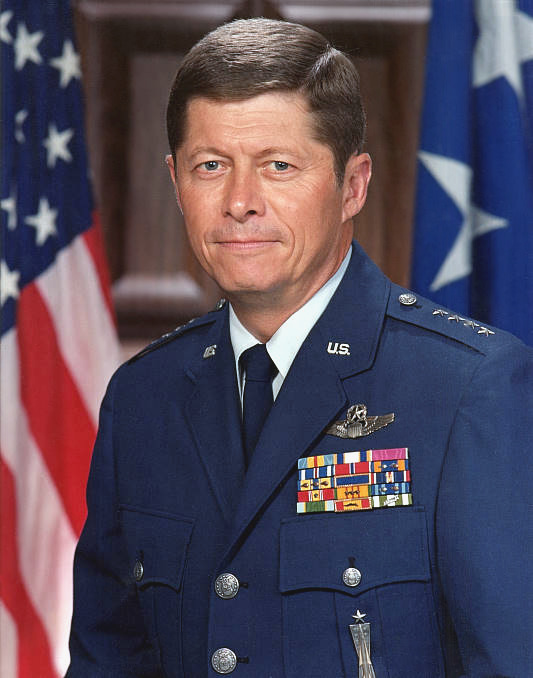
- General Thomas M. Ryan Jr., U.S. Air Force
- Born: Thomas Martin Ryan Jr. December 10, 1928; Detroit, Michigan, U.S.
- Died: August 9, 2024 (aged 95); San Antonio, Texas
- Burial place: Glennville City Cemetery, Glennville, Georgia, U.S.
- Military career
- Allegiance: United States of America
- Branch: United States Air Force
- Service years: 1950–1985
- Rank: General

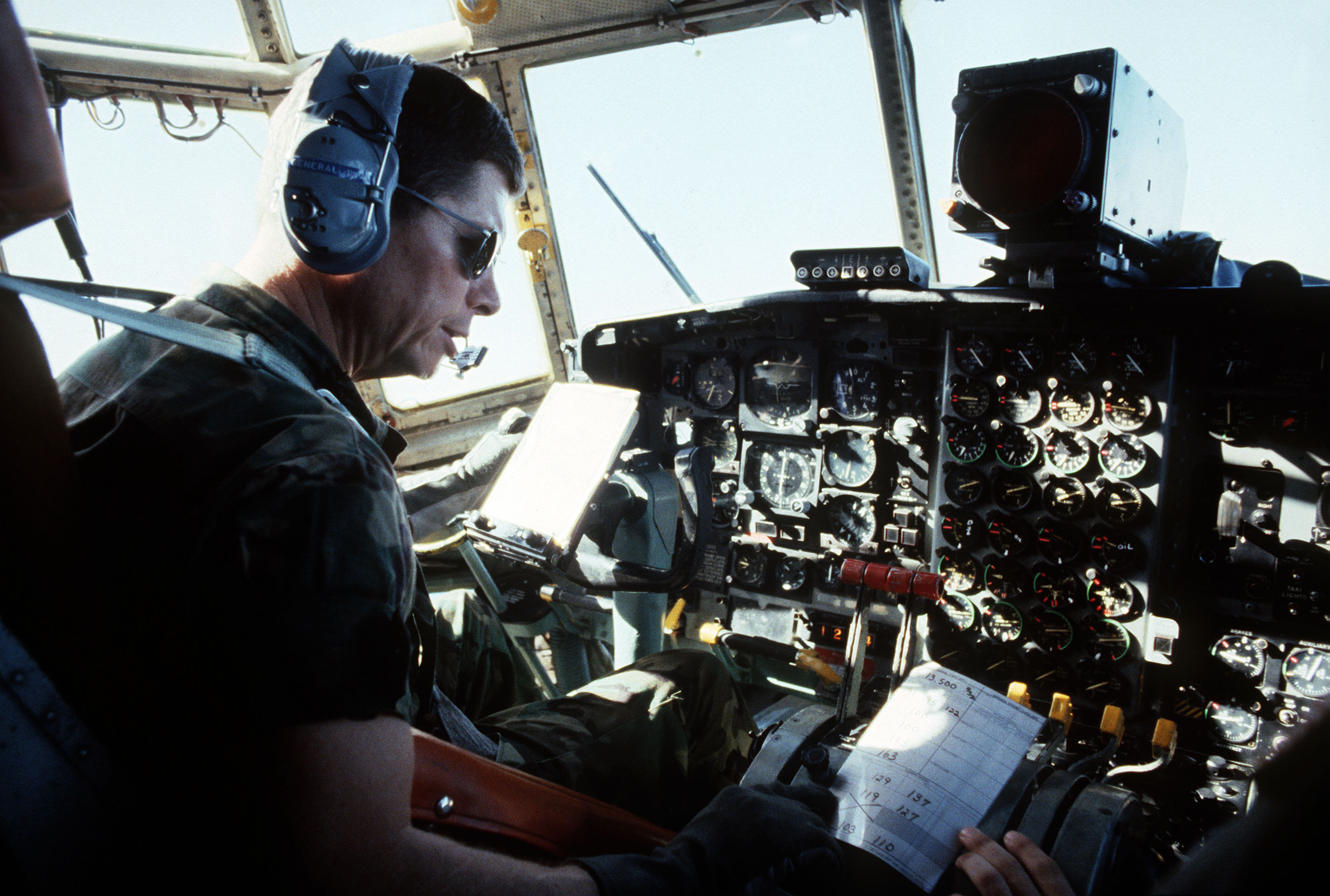
General Thomas M. Ryan Jr. Flying a Lockheed C-130 Hercules during Operation Urgent Fury, November 1983.

Thomas Martin Ryan Jr. (December 10, 1928 – August 9, 2024) was a United States Air Force general who served as the commander of Air Training Command (COMATC) from 1981 to 1983 and as Commander in Chief of the Military Airlift Command (CINCMAC) from 1983 to 1985.

== Early life and education ==
Ryan was born on December 10, 1928, in Detroit, Michigan, and graduated from Ridgewood High School in Ridgewood, New Jersey, in 1946. He received a Bachelor of Science degree in military science from the University of Omaha in 1965, and a Master of Science degree in international affairs from The George Washington University, Washington, D.C., in 1968. He graduated from the Armed Forces Staff College at Norfolk, Virginia, in 1965 and from the Air War College at Maxwell Air Force Base, Alabama, in 1968.

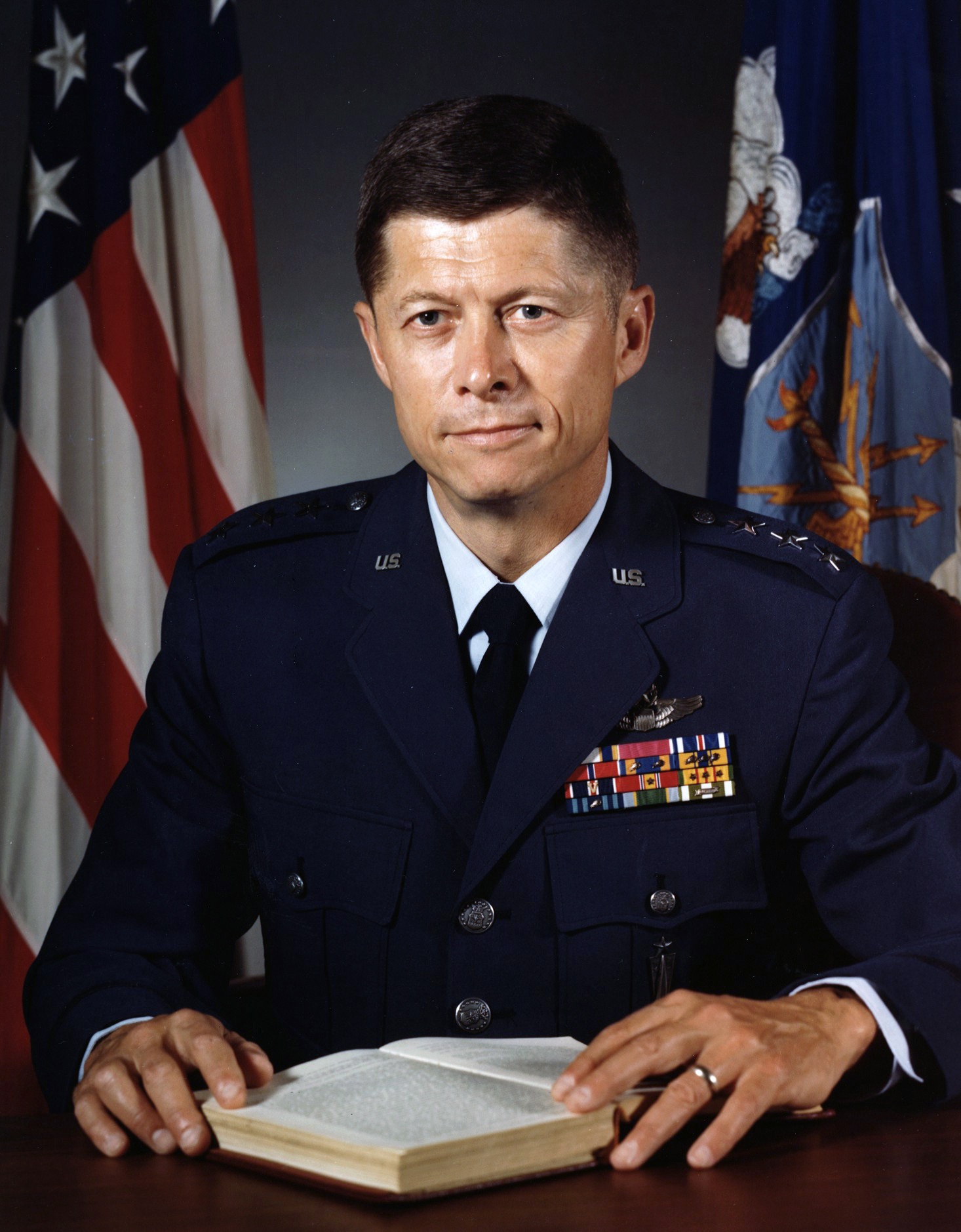
Ryan during his tenure as a lieutenant general.

== Career ==
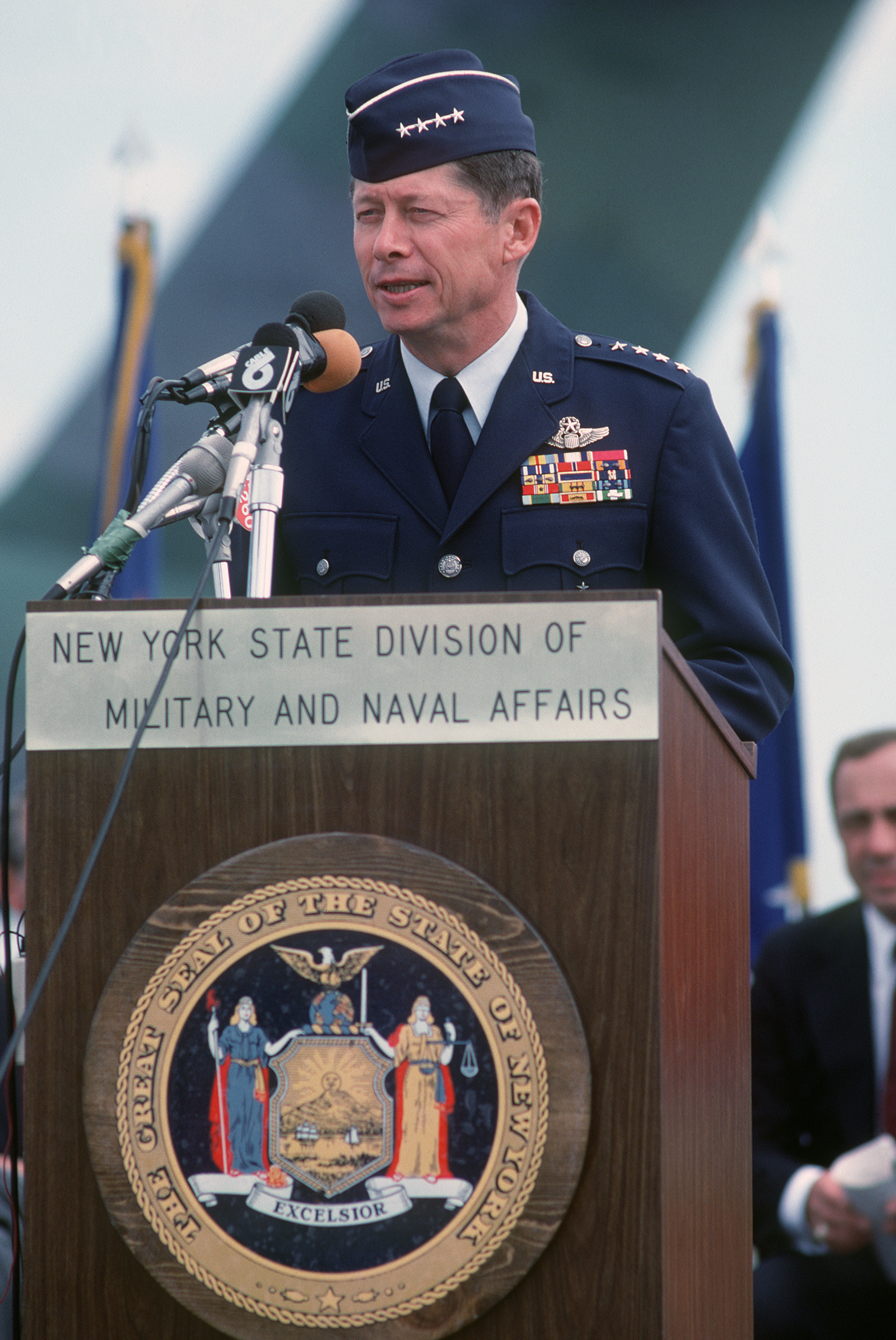
General Thomas M. Ryan Jr. speaks at 105th Military Airlift Group, July 2, 1985.

Ryan became an aviation cadet in September 1949, and after completing pilot training at Reese Air Force Base, Texas, he was commissioned a second lieutenant in October 1950. He then served in various flying assignments with the Strategic Air Command at Barksdale Air Force Base, Louisiana; Ramey Air Force Base, Puerto Rico; and Hunter Air Force Base, Georgia, until July 1953 when he entered observer training school at Ellington and James Connally Air Force bases, Texas.

From May 1954 to June 1962, he was assigned to Forbes Air Force Base, Kansas, as a B-47 pilot, select crew aircraft commander, instructor pilot and squadron operations officer. In 1958 he became a standardization evaluator in the 90th Strategic Reconnaissance Wing.

Ryan transferred to SAC headquarters at Offutt Air Force Base, Nebraska, in June 1962 as a staff officer in the Plans and Organizational Section of the Weapons Management Branch, Weapons Maintenance Division. In February 1965 he entered the Armed Forces Staff College and following graduation in July 1965 he joined the SR-71 equipped 4200th Strategic Reconnaissance Wing at Beale Air Force Base, California, where he served as chief of the Quality Control Division and later as chief of the Maintenance Control Division.

In July 1968 he graduated from the Air War College and then attended RF-4C combat crew training at Shaw Air Force Base, South Carolina. In March 1969 he was assigned to the 432nd Tactical Reconnaissance Wing at Udorn Royal Thai Air Force Base, Thailand, as a maintenance control officer and later as chief of maintenance. During this tour of duty he flew 114 combat missions in RF-4C's.

Upon his return to the United States, Ryan served on the staff of the inspector general, Headquarters U.S. Air Force, Washington, D.C., from April 1970 to June 1971. He then transferred to Wurtsmith Air Force Base, Michigan, as vice commander and then commander of the 379th Bombardment Wing. During 1972 and 1973, he completed a temporary tour of duty as commander, 303rd Consolidated Aircraft Maintenance Wing at Andersen Air Force Base, Guam, and participated in the Linebacker II campaign against North Vietnam in December 1972.

He assumed duties as commander of the 47th Air Division with headquarters at Fairchild Air Force Base, Washington, in July 1973. Ryan was again assigned to SAC headquarters in January 1974 as assistant deputy chief of staff for logistics and in January 1975 become the deputy chief of staff for logistics.

He returned to Air Force headquarters in April 1976 as director for logistics plans and programs, and in July 1977 become the deputy chief of staff for systems and logistics. From October 1977 to July 1981, Ryan served as vice commander in chief of the Military Airlift Command at Scott Air Force Base. He then became commander of Air Training Command at Randolph Air Force Base, Texas. He assumed command of Military Airlift Command in June 1983.

Ryan was a command pilot with more than 8,000 flying hours. His military decorations and awards included the Defense Distinguished Service Medal, Air Force Distinguished Service Medal, Legion of Merit, Distinguished Flying Cross, Bronze Star Medal, Air Medal with six oak leaf clusters and Air Force Commendation Medal with three oak leaf clusters.

Ryan was promoted to general August 1, 1981, with date of rank July 31, 1981.

== Awards and decorations ==
Command Air Force Pilot Badge
Basic Missile Maintenance Badge

Defense Distinguished Service Medal
Air Force Distinguished Service Medal
Legion of Merit
Distinguished Flying Cross
Bronze Star Medal
Air Medal
Air Force Commendation Medal with three bronze oak leaf clusters
Air Force Presidential Unit Citation
Air Force Outstanding Unit Award with Valor device
National Defense Service Medal with one bronze service star
Vietnam Service Medal with three bronze service stars
Air Force Longevity Service Award with silver and three bronze oak leaf clusters
Small Arms Expert Marksmanship Ribbon
Republic of Vietnam Gallantry Cross
Vietnam Campaign Medal

== Effective dates of promotion ==
Insignia	Rank	Date
	General	August 1, 1981
	Lieutenant general	July 1, 1977
	Major general	September 1, 1975
	Brigadier general	October 1, 1973
	Colonel	October 1, 1969
	Lieutenant colonel	November 21, 1966
	Major	July 15, 1963
	Captain	January 17, 1956
	First lieutenant	June 3, 1952
	Second lieutenant	October 28, 1950

== Later life ==
Ryan retired from the U.S. Air Force on September 30, 1985.

He was a member of the Rotary Club in Glennville, Georgia.

In 2011, he was inducted into the Airlift/Tanker Association Hall of Fame.

Ryan died on August 9, 2024, in San Antonio, Texas, at age of 95. He was buried at Glennville City Cemetery in Glennville, Georgia.
