= Duane H. Cassidy =

United States Air Force general

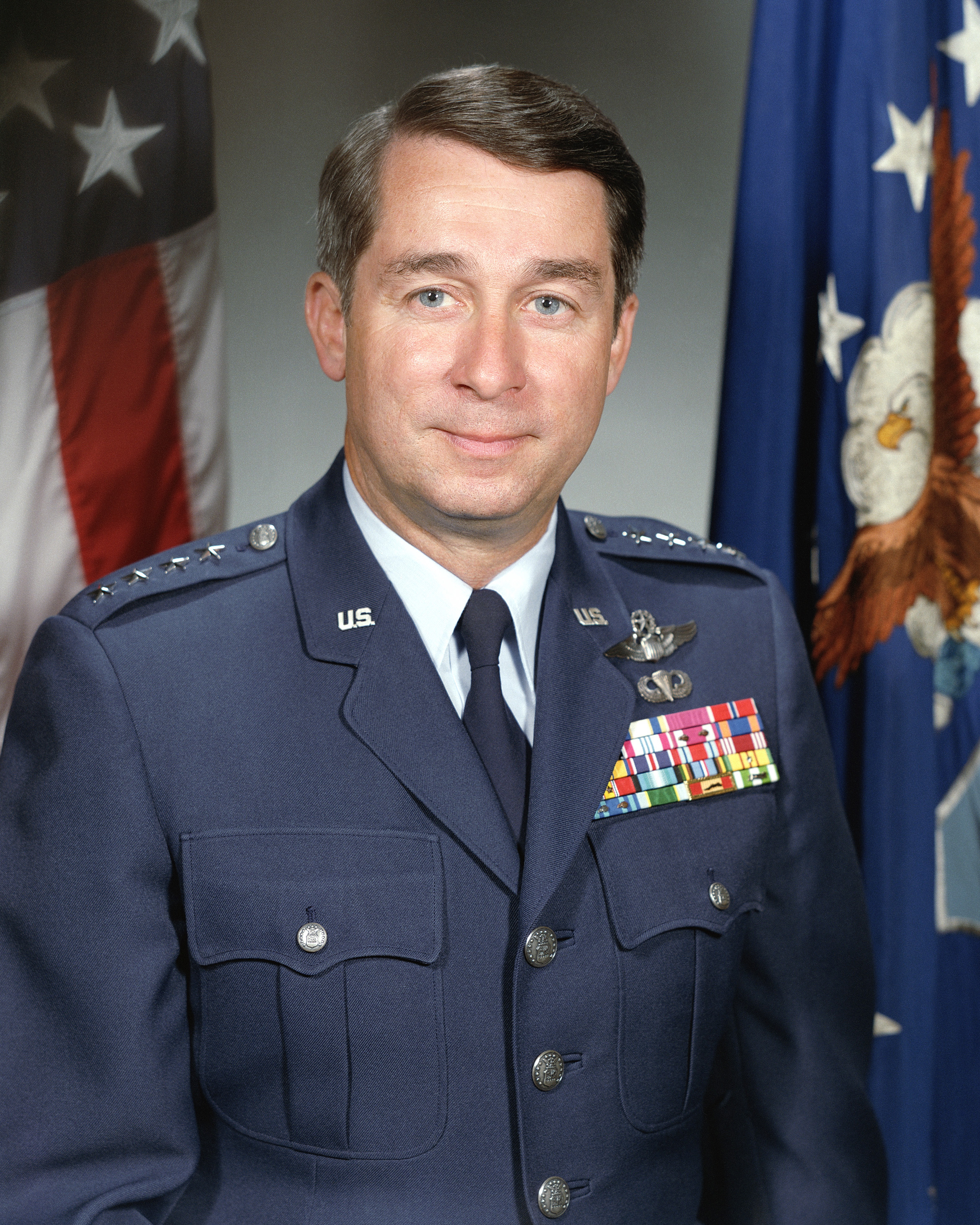
- Born: 24 November 1933; Coraopolis, Pennsylvania
- Died: 8 February 2016 (aged 82); Chapel Hill, North Carolina
- Burial place: Arlington National Cemetery
- Military career
- Allegiance: United States
- Branch: United States Air Force
- Service years: 1954–1989
- Rank: General
- Commands: United States Transportation Command; Military Airlift Command; 21st Air Force; 63rd Airlift Wing; 8th Airlift Squadron
- Conflicts: Vietnam War
- Awards: Air Force Distinguished Service Medal; Legion of Merit; Bronze Star Medal

Duane Harlan Cassidy (24 November 1933 – 8 February 2016) was a general in the United States Air Force and the former commander of the Military Airlift Command and United States Transportation Command.

== Early life ==
Cassidy was born in Coraopolis, Pennsylvania, in 1933. He earned a Bachelor of Science degree from the University of Nebraska in 1968 and a Master of Science degree from Troy State University in 1975. He completed Squadron Officer School in 1961 at the Industrial College of the Armed Forces in 1973, the J.L. Kellogg Graduate School of Management at Northwestern University in 1979, and the program for senior executives in national and international security at the John F. Kennedy School of Government, Harvard University, in 1983.

== Military career ==
Upon completion of aviation cadet training, Cassidy was commissioned as a second lieutenant in 1954. He then attended navigator training at Harlingen and James Connally Air Force Bases, Texas. His initial operational assignments in the Air Force were to the Military Air Transport Service: first to the Air Weather Service's 6th Weather Group, Wright-Patterson Air Force Base, Ohio, flying B-25 Mitchells, and then to Air Rescue Service's 49th Air Rescue Squadron, Selfridge Air Force Base, Michigan. During these assignments, he participated in numerous rescue and weather reconnaissance missions, including the hydrogen weapons test in 1956 at Eniwetok Atoll in the Marshall Islands. His navigator assignments ended after two years as a Military Air Transport Service C-121 Constellation line crew member at Charleston Air Force Base, South Carolina. He entered pilot training in December 1958.

Cassidy was assigned to Strategic Air Command after graduation from pilot training and flew B-47 Stratojets at McCoy Air Force Base, Florida, Little Rock Air Force Base, Arkansas, and Lincoln Air Force Base, Nebraska. In November 1965, he transferred to Minot Air Force Base, North Dakota, and served with the 810th Strategic Aerospace Division, whose mission included B-52 Stratofortress bomber and LGM-30 Minuteman missile operations. In September 1968, he was assigned to the Republic of Vietnam, serving first with 7th Air Force's Tactical Air Control Center and then with the Military Assistance Command's Vietnam Directorate of Public Affairs as an air briefer to the Saigon press corps.

Cassidy returned to the Air Force airlift mission in October 1969. He was assigned to Military Airlift Command headquarters as executive to the deputy chief of staff for operations, and later as executive aide and pilot for the Military Airlift Command commander. In August 1972, he assumed command of the 8th Airlift Squadron, McChord Air Force Base, Washington. He entered the Air War College in August 1974 and, upon graduation, again served at Military Airlift Command headquarters, as assistant chief of staff.

In August 1976, Cassidy was assigned as vice commander of the 63rd Airlift Wing at Norton Air Force Base, California. In February 1978, he became commander of the wing. He returned to Military Airlift Command headquarters in July 1980 and served initially as assistant deputy chief of staff for operations. In August 1981, he became the command's deputy chief of staff for operations.

From October 1983 to August 1984, Cassidy served as commander of Military Airlift Command's 21st Air Force at McGuire Air Force Base, New Jersey During this period, Military Airlift Command was heavily involved in support of United States' operations in Lebanon and Grenada. General Cassidy then transferred to Headquarters United States Air Force, Washington D.C., where he served as deputy chief of staff for manpower and personnel. He was promoted to general 8 November 1985, with same date of rank. The general assumed command of Military Airlift Command in September 1985 and of the United States Transportation Command upon its activation 1 Oct. 1987.

Cassidy died from cancer on 8 February 2016, and was buried at Arlington National Cemetery on 18 November.

== Awards ==
Awards earned during his career:

US Air Force Command Pilot Badge
US Air Force Senior Navigator Badge
Basic Parachutist badge
United States Transportation Command Badge

Air Force Distinguished Service Medal
Legion of Merit
Bronze Star
Defense Meritorious Service Medal
Meritorious Service Medal with two oak leaf clusters
Air Medal
Air Force Commendation Medal
Air Force Outstanding Unit Award
Combat Readiness Medal
Army Good Conduct Medal
National Defense Service Medal with one bronze service star
Antarctica Service Medal
Armed Forces Expeditionary Medal
Vietnam Service Medal with silver service star
Air Force Overseas Long Tour Service Ribbon with oak leaf cluster
Air Force Longevity Service Award with one silver and two bronze oak leaf clusters
Small Arms Expert Marksmanship Ribbon
Air Force Training Ribbon
Vietnam Gallantry Cross Unit Citation
Vietnam Campaign Medal

- Command pilot and senior navigator with more than 8,000 flying hours.

In 2006 he was inducted into the Airlift/Tanker Association Hall of Fame.
