= Walter Kross =

United States general (born 1942)

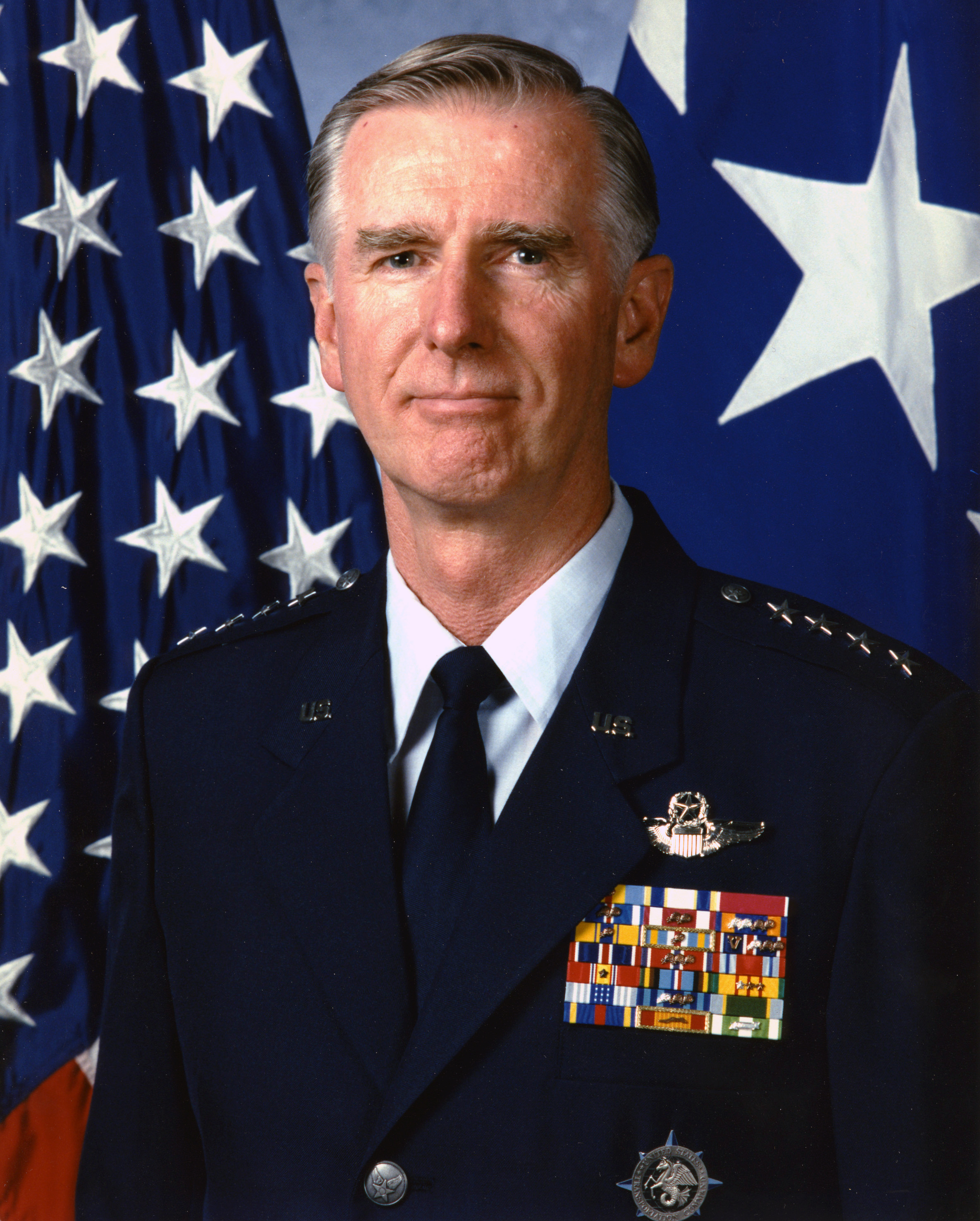
- Born: October 3, 1942 (age 84); Bronx, New York
- Military career
- Allegiance: United States
- Branch: United States Air Force
- Service years: 1964–1998
- Rank: General
- Commands: Air Mobility Command; United States Transportation Command; 15th Air Force; 436th Military Airlift Wing
- Conflicts: Vietnam War
- Awards: Defense Distinguished Service Medal (2); Air Force Distinguished Service Medal; Legion of Merit; Distinguished Flying Cross (3)

General Walter Kross (born October 3, 1942) is a retired United States Air Force four-star general who served as Commander in Chief, United States Transportation Command/Commander, Air Mobility Command from 1996 to 1998.

Kross was commissioned through Officer Training School in December 1964. His early career combined both fighter and airlift experience as he flew 157 F-4 combat missions, 100 over North Vietnam. He later transitioned to airlift, then senior executive and congressional pilot support. He was assigned to Headquarters United States Air Force for six years, part of that time in the Chief's Staff Group. He has served as commander of a C-5 wing, as director of operations and logistics for all defense transportation requirements in Operations Desert Shield and Desert Storm, and as director of operations for Air Force headquarters. Additionally, Kross was commander of the provisional force in charge of standing up Air Mobility Command, as well as its first vice commander. He was also commander of 15th Air Force, Travis Air Force Base, California, then director, Joint Staff, Washington, D.C.

== Education ==
- 1964 Bachelor of Science degree in chemistry, Niagara University, New York
- 1971 Distinguished graduate, Squadron Officer School, Maxwell Air Force Base, Alabama
- 1974 Master's degree in government, Southern Illinois University
- 1975 Master's degree in public administration, Auburn University, Alabama
- 1975 Distinguished graduate, Air Command and Staff College, Maxwell Air Force Base, Alabama
- 1977 Air War College
- 1982 National War College, Fort Lesley J. McNair, Washington, D.C.
- 1985 Executive Development Program, Kellogg School of Management, Northwestern University
- 1990 Senior Executive Seminar, John F. Kennedy School of Government, Harvard University

== Assignments ==
- December 1964 – July 1966, student, pilot training, Laredo Air Force Base, Texas
- July 1966 – February 1967, F-4 pilot, 25th Tactical Fighter Squadron, Eglin Air Force Base, Florida
- February 1967 – September 1967, F-4 pilot, 476th Tactical Fighter Squadron, George Air Force Base, California
- September 1967 – September 1968, F-4C aircraft commander, 390th Tactical Fighter Squadron, Da Nang Air Base, South Vietnam
- September 1968 – March 1972, C-141 pilot, 76th Military Airlift Squadron, later, flight examiner, 437th Military Airlift Wing, Charleston Air Force Base, South Carolina
- March 1972 – August 1974, VC-135 and VC-137 special missions pilot, 98th Military Airlift Squadron, Andrews Air Force Base, Maryland
- August 1974 – August 1975, student, Air Command and Staff College, Maxwell Air Force Base
- August 1975 – April 1979, air operations officer, tactical forces division, and later, assistant deputy director for Joint and Congressional Matters, directorate of plans, Headquarters U.S. Air Force, Washington, D.C.
- April 1979 – July 1981, member, chief of staff of the Air Force Staff Group, Headquarters U.S. Air Force, Washington, D.C.
- July 1981 – June 1982, student, National War College, and senior research fellow, National Defense University, Fort Lesley J. McNair, Washington, D.C.
- June 1982 – March 1984, deputy commander for operations and later, vice commander, 89th Military Airlift Wing, Andrews Air Force Base
- March 1984 – July 1987, vice commander, and later, commander, 436th Military Airlift Wing, Dover Air Force Base, Delaware
- July 1987 – October 1988, vice commander, Air Force Military Personnel Center, and deputy assistant deputy chief of staff, personnel for military personnel, Randolph Air Force Base, Texas
- October 1988 – May 1990, deputy chief of staff, plans and requirements, Headquarters Air Training Command, Randolph Air Force Base, Texas
- May 1990 – July 1991, director of operations and logistics (J-3/J-4), Headquarters U.S. Transportation Command, Scott Air Force Base, Illinois
- July 1991 – January 1992, director of operations, Office of the Deputy Chief of Staff, Plans and Operations, Headquarters U.S. Air Force, Washington, D.C.
- January 1992 – July 1992, commander, Air Mobility Command (Provisional), Scott Air Force Base, Illinois
- July 1992 – June 1993, vice commander, Air Mobility Command, Scott Air Force Base, Illinois
- June 1993 – July 1994, commander, 15th Air Force, Travis Air Force Base, California
- July 1994 – July 1996, director, Joint Staff, the Pentagon, Washington, D.C.
- July 1996 – 1998, commander in chief, U.S. Transportation Command, and commander, Air Mobility Command, Scott Air Force Base, Illinois

== Flight information ==
- Rating: Command pilot
- Flight hours: More than 5,700
- Aircraft flown: F-4, C-141, VC-135, VC-137, C-5, T-37, T-38, T-33, KC-135, C-140, C-21, C-9 and KC-10

== Awards and decorations ==
Air Force Command Pilot Badge
United States Transportation Command Badge

Defense Distinguished Service Medal with one bronze oak leaf cluster
Air Force Distinguished Service Medal
Legion of Merit
Distinguished Flying Cross with two oak leaf clusters
Meritorious Service Medal with two oak leaf clusters
Air Medal with twelve oak leaf clusters
Air Force Commendation Medal with oak leaf cluster
Joint Meritorious Unit Award with oak leaf cluster
Air Force Outstanding Unit Award with "V" device, one silver and two bronze oak leaf clusters
Air Force Outstanding Unit Award (second ribbon to denote ninth award)
Air Force Organizational Excellence Award with three oak leaf clusters
Combat Readiness Medal
National Defense Service Medal with one bronze service star
Armed Forces Expeditionary Medal
Vietnam Service Medal with seven service stars
Air Force Overseas Short Tour Service Ribbon
Air Force Longevity Service Award with one silver and two bronze oak leaf clusters
Small Arms Expert Marksmanship Ribbon
Air Force Training Ribbon
Vietnam Gallantry Cross Unit Citation
Vietnam Campaign Medal

== Publications ==
- Military Reform: The High Tech Debate in Tactical Air Forces, 1985 OCLC 12410172
- Splash One: Air Victory Over Hanoi, 1991 ISBN 0080405673
