= History of the United States Space Force =

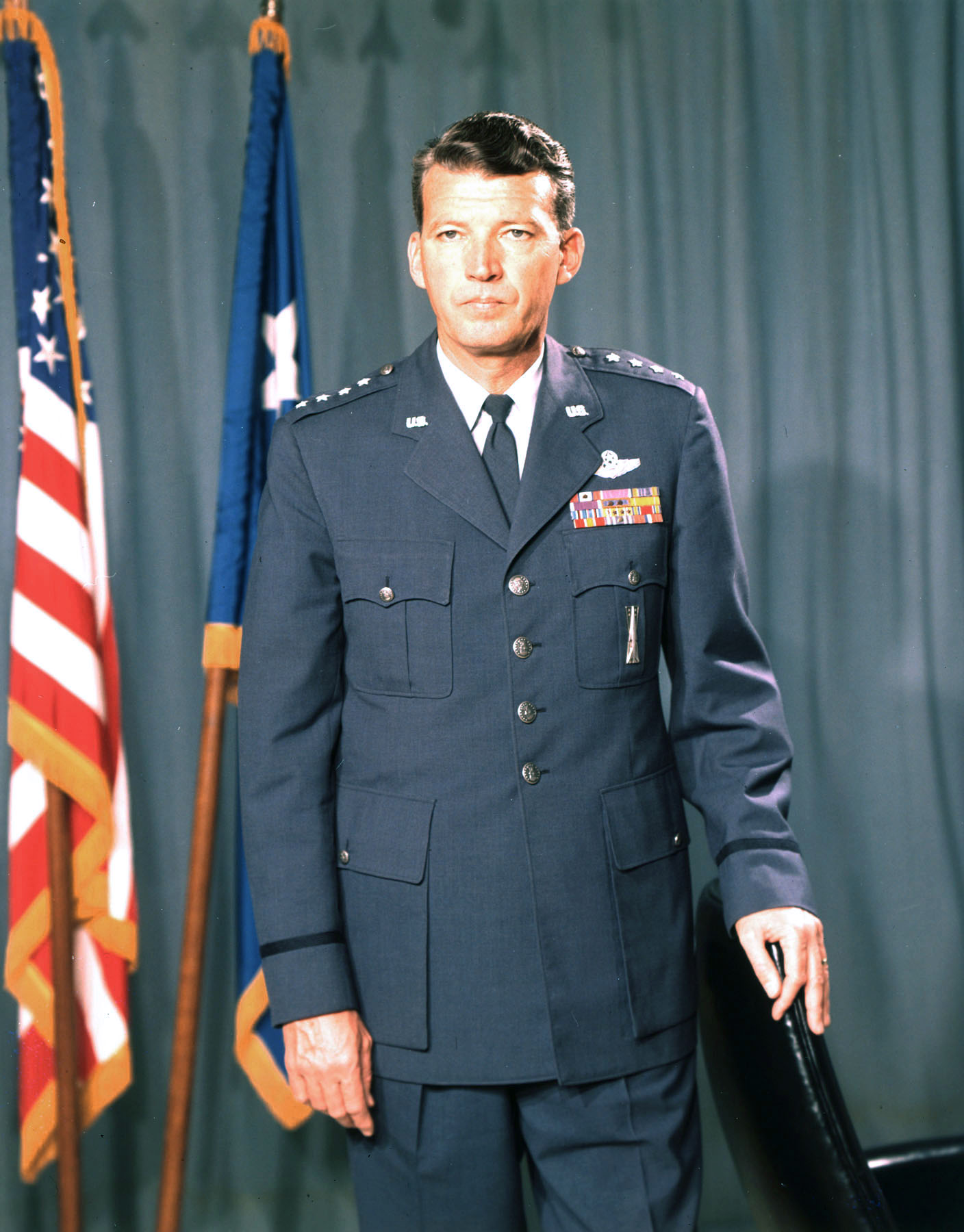
General Bernard Schriever, father of the United States Space Force and military space

While the United States Space Force was established in December 2019, the history of the U.S. Department of Defense in space can be traced back to the aftermath of the Second World War. General Henry H. Arnold, chief of the United States Army Air Forces, identified space as a crucial military arena decades before the first spaceflight. The United States Air Force gained its independence from the Army on 18 September 1947. The Air Force began developing space and ballistic missile programs, while competing with the United States Army and United States Navy for space missions.

In 1954, the Air Force created its first space organization, the Western Development Division, under the leadership of General Bernard Schriever. The Western Development Division and its successor organization, the Air Force Ballistic Missile Division, were instrumental in developing the first United States military launch vehicles and spacecraft, competing predominantly with the Army Ballistic Missile Agency under the leadership of General John Bruce Medaris and former German scientist Wernher von Braun. The launch of Sputnik 1 spurred a massive reorganization of military space and the 1958 establishment of the Advanced Research Projects Agency was a short-lived effort to centralized management of military space, with some fearing it would become a military service for space, with authorities being returned to the services in 1959. The establishment of NASA in 1958, however, completely decimated the Army Ballistic Missile Agency, resulting in the Air Force Ballistic Missile Division serving as the primary military space organization. In 1961, the Air Force was designated as the Department of Defense's executive agent for space and Air Research and Development Command was reorganized into Air Force Systems Command, with the Air Force Ballistic Missile Division being replaced by the Space Systems Division - the first Air Force division solely focused on space. In the 1960s, military space activities began to be operationalized, with Aerospace Defense Command taking control of missile warning and space surveillance on behalf of NORAD, Strategic Air Command assuming the weather reconnaissance mission, and Air Force Systems Command operating the first generations of communications satellites on behalf of the Defense Communications Agency. In 1967, the Space Systems Division and Ballistic Missiles Division were merged to form the Space and Missile Systems Organization, which began to develop the next generation of satellite communications, space-based missile warning, space launch vehicles and infrastructure, and the predecessor to the Global Positioning System. Space forces also saw their first employment in the Vietnam War, providing weather and communications support to ground and air forces.

The disjointed nature of military space forces across three military commands resulted in a reevaluation of space force organization within the Air Force. In 1979, the Space and Missile Systems Organization was split, forming the Space Division, and in 1980, Aerospace Defense Command was inactivated and its space forces transferred to Strategic Air Command. Resulting from internal and external pressures, including an effort by a congressman to rename the Air Force into the Aerospace Force and the possibility that President Reagan would direct the creation of a space force as a separate military branch, the Air Force directed the formation of Air Force Space Command in 1982. During the 1980s, Air Force Space Command absorbed the space missions of Strategic Air Command and the launch mission from Air Force Systems Command. Space forces provided space support during the Falklands War, United States invasion of Grenada, the 1986 United States bombing of Libya, Operation Earnest Will, and the United States invasion of Panama. The first major employment of space forces culminated in the Gulf War, where space forces proved so critical to the U.S.-led coalition, that it is sometimes referred to as the first space war.

Following the end of the Gulf War, the Air Force came under intense congressional scrutiny by seeking to artificially merge its air and space operations into a seamless aerospace continuum, without regard for the differences between space and air. The 2001 Space Commission criticized the Air Force for institutionalizing the primacy of aviation pilots over space officers in Air Force Space Command, for stifling the development of an independent space culture, and not paying sufficient budgetary attention to space. The Space Commission recommended the formation of a Space Corps within the Air Force between 2007 and 2011, with an independent Space Force to be created at a later date. The September 11 attacks derailed most progress in space development, resulting in the inactivation of United States Space Command and beginning a period of atrophy in military space. The only major change to occur was the transfer of the Space and Missile Systems Center from Air Force Materiel Command to Air Force Space Command. Following the inactivation of U.S. Space Command in 2002, Russia and China began developing sophisticated on-orbit capabilities and an array of counter-space weapons. On 29 August 2019, United States Space Command was reestablished as a geographic combatant command.

In response to advances by the Russian Space Forces and Chinese People's Liberation Army Strategic Support Force and frustrated by the Air Force's focus on fighters at the expense of space, Democratic Representative Jim Cooper and Republican Representative Mike Rogers introduced a bipartisan proposal to establish the United States Space Corps in 2017. While the Space Corps proposal failed in the senate, in 2019, the United States Space Force was signed into law, with Air Force Space Command becoming the United States Space Force.

== Early military space development (1946–1957) ==
On 18 September 1947, the Army Air Forces gained their independence as the United States Air Force. While the Air Force claimed that military space was its domain, the new service prioritized conventional aircraft over ballistic missile and space development.

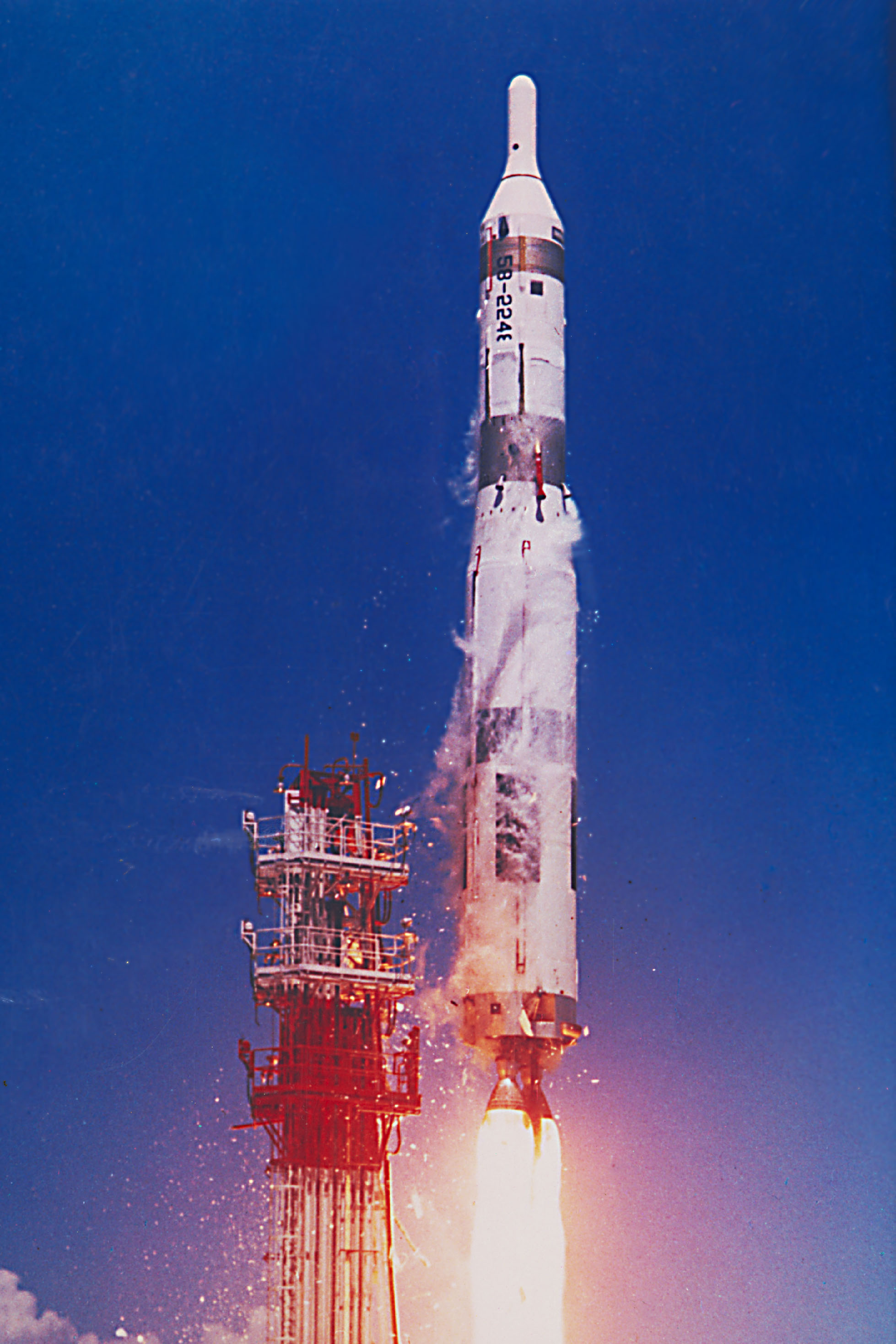
Test launch of a HGM-25A Titan I intercontinental ballistic missile from Cape Canaveral Launch Complex 19

Each of the three services continued to have independent ballistic missile and space development programs, with the United States Army Ordnance Department running the Hermes program out of White Sands, albeit with representatives from the Air Force Cambridge Research Center and Naval Research Laboratory. The Army saw rocketry and missiles as an extension of artillery and on 24 February 1949 launched a RTV-G-4 Bumper rocket to an altitude of 393 kilometers. This set the stage for future Army space and missile developments under Wernher von Braun, initially at Fort Bliss and after 1950 at Redstone Arsenal. von Braun's team would later go on to develop the PGM-11 Redstone short-range ballistic missile, PGM-19 Jupiter medium-range ballistic missile, and Juno I and Juno II launch vehicles. United States Navy space research was run primarily through the civilian-led Johns Hopkins University Applied Physics Laboratory and Naval Research Laboratory, while the Army and Air Force organized their military space development under military programs. The Navy developed the Aerobee and Viking rockets. The United States Air Force centralized its missile program under Air Materiel Command, cutting its programs significantly due to the Truman drawdown after the Second World War. This eliminated the RTV-A-2 Hiroc, which was the Air Force's only long-range missile program.

After the Air Force's sweeping cuts to research and development, in 1949, General Hoyt Vandenberg, the second Air Force chief of staff, commissioned two reports which concluded that abdicating its missile and space activities could result in the Army and Navy taking over those responsibilities. In response, on 23 January 1950, the Air Force established a deputy chief of staff of the Air Force for research and on 1 February 1950 activated Air Research and Development Command (ARDC). ARDC absorbed Air Materiel Command's engineering division and became responsible for Air Force missile and space programs. The outbreak of the Korean War led to the Air Force regaining a significant amount of funding, and in January 1951, ARDC began development on the Convair SM-65 Atlas intercontinental ballistic missile, however ballistic missiles had a number of skeptics on the Air Staff, which led to reduced funding and slowed development. In April 1951, Project RAND released two studies on military satellite development, with one titled "Utility of a Satellite Vehicle for Reconnaissance" and the other "Inquiring into the Feasibility of Weather Reconnaissance from a Satellite Vehicle." The reports were enthusiastically received at Air Research and Development Command, which started a number of satellite design programs. In late 1953, ARDC assigned the satellite program the designation of Weapons Systems 117L (WS-117L), beginning development at the Wright Air Development Center.

In response to the cautious approach of Air Research and Development Command and delaying tactics by the Air Staff, Assistant Secretary of the Air Force for Research and Development Trevor Gardner convened the Strategic Missiles Evaluation Committee led by John von Neumann to accelerate ballistic missile development. The findings of the von Neumann Committee and a parallel RAND study resulted in the establishment of the Western Development Division (WDD) under Brigadier General Bernard Schriever, a protégé of General of the Air Force Hap Arnold, on 1 July 1954. The Western Development Division, part of Air Research and Development Command, was given total responsibility for all ballistic missile development.

The Western Development Division launched several "parallel" engineering efforts. Two contractors would both be tasked to achieve the same goal. This increased costs, but potentially speeded up development times. Its primary program was the Convair SM-65 Atlas ICBM, developing the Martin Marietta HGM-25A Titan I ICBM as a backup, in case of the failure of the Atlas. Ultimately both missiles were put into service. On 10 October 1955, responsibility for the development of military satellites, to include the Advanced Reconnaissance System, was transferred from the Wright Air Development Center to WDD.

In August 1954, Congress authorized the government to begin development of a satellite to be launched for the International Geophysical Year. Each of the military services sought to compete to launch a satellite from their service for the competition, however the Department of Defense directed that it not detract from the Air Force Western Development Division's ballistic missile development program. The initially IGY scientific satellite was intended to establish the legal doctrine of "freedom of space," enabling spacecraft to fly over any country. The Army Ordnance Corps and Office of Naval Research jointly proposed Project Orbiter, which was led by Army Major General John Bruce Medaris and Army scientist Wernher von Braun. The Army was responsible for developing the booster, based on the PGM-19 Jupiter, while the Navy was responsible for the satellite, tracking facilities, and data analysis. The Naval Research Laboratory, however, proposed the single-service Project Vanguard, developing the Vanguard rocket and satellite, along with the Minitrack satellite tracking network. The Air Force Western Development Division initially declined to participate, focusing on military space programs rather than scientific endeavors, but was directed by the Department of Defense to put forward a proposal — an SM-65C Atlas booster with an Aerobee-Hi space probe. Ultimately, the Defense Department selected the Navy's Project Vanguard, and although it thought that the Western Development Divisions's proposal showed great promise, it did not want to interfere with the development of the Atlas ICBM.

On 1 August 1957, the Western Development Division was redesignated as the Air Force Ballistic Missile Division (AFBMD). Two months later, on 4 October 1957, the Soviet Union beat the United States into space, launching Sputnik 1 from the Baikonur Cosmodrome. The launch of Sputnik greatly embarrassed the United States, which had the year prior prohibited any government officials to speak publicly about spaceflight. In February 1957, General Schriever, the senior space officer in the Air Force, was directed by the secretary of defense to not mention "space" in any of his speeches, after publicly discussing the importance of studying military offensive functions in space and declaring that the time is ripe for the Air Force to move into space. Immediately after Sputnik 1's launch, the gag order was rescinded.

== Post–Sputnik crisis and organizational reforms (1957–1961) ==
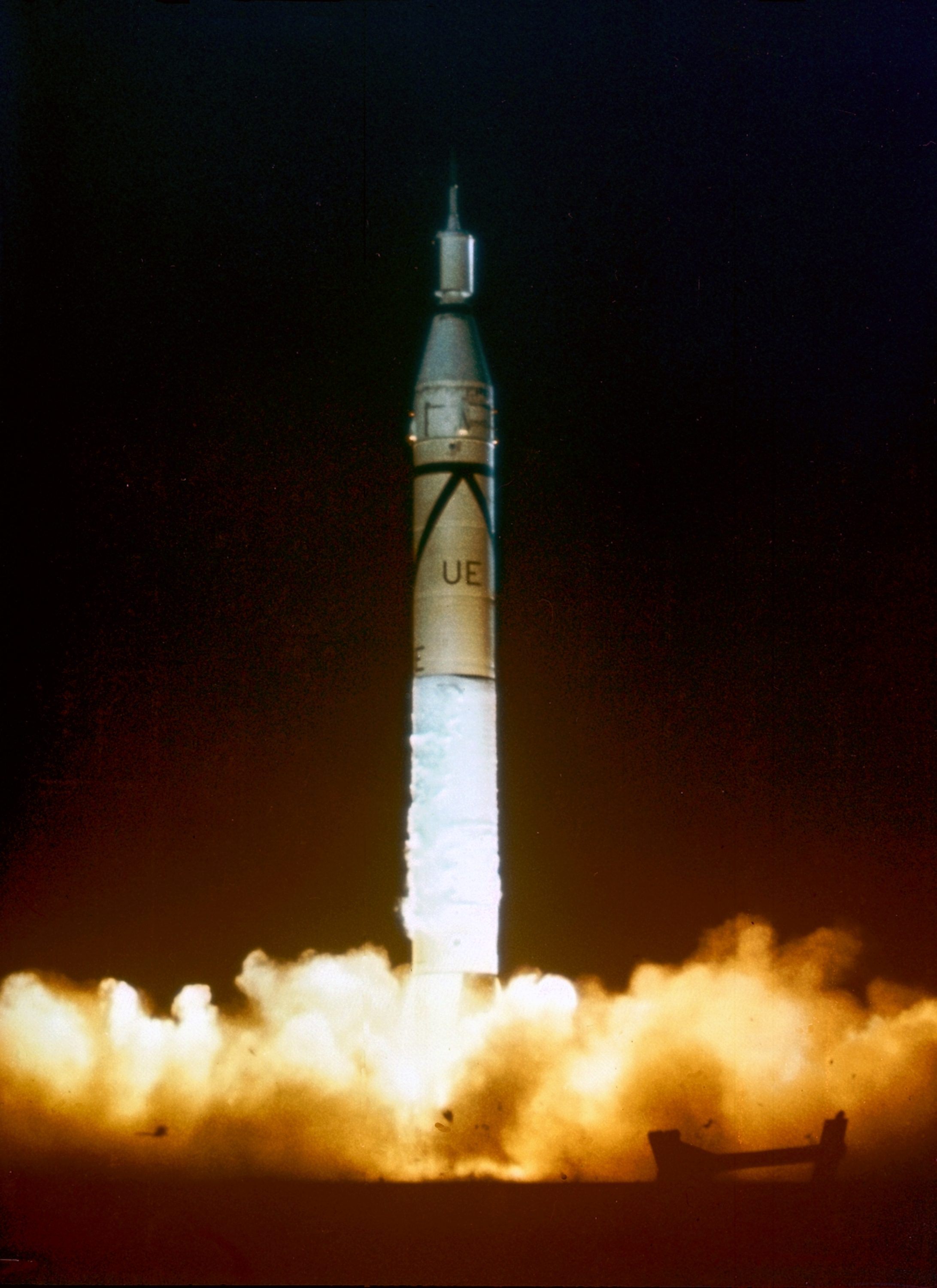
Launch of Explorer 1 on a Juno I rocket from Cape Canaveral Launch Complex 26

In the aftermath of the launch of Sputnik 1, President Dwight D. Eisenhower implemented massive reforms in the civil and military space programs. The Soviet Union launched Sputnik 2 shortly after on 3 November 1957, with the Soviet space dog Laika on board. On 8 November 1957, the Department of Defense authorized the Army Ballistic Missile Agency to begin preparations to launch Project Orbiter's Explorer 1 on a Juno I rocket in case that the Navy's Project Vanguard were to fail. On 31 January 1958, the Army launched Explorer 1, the first American satellite and the third satellite to orbit the Earth, from Cape Canaveral Launch Complex 26.

=== Establishment of the Defense Advanced Research Projects Agency ===
The Air Force used the launch of Sputnik 1 to argue that it should control the entire national space program, both civil and military. This was, in part, spurred by concern that congressional representatives were favoring the Army's space program, led by von Braun. In response, the Air Force led a public campaign to emphasize that space was a natural extension of its mission, coining the term "aerospace" to describe a single continuous sphere of operations from the Earth's atmosphere to outer space. The Air Force attempted to establish the Department of Astronautics on the Air Staff, announcing the decision on 10 December 1957, however Secretary of Defense Neil H. McElroy prohibited its creation, instead announcing on 20 December that the Defense Department would establish the Defense Advanced Research Projects Agency (DARPA) to unify the space programs of the Army, Navy and Air Force. Organizationally, the Air Force would represent space on the Air Staff through the assistant chief of staff of the Air Force for guided missiles, finally being permitted to create the Directorate of Advanced Technology to handle space responsibilities after the National Aeronautics and Space Act was passed by congress on 29 July 1958.

On 24 January 1958, the Air Force Astronautics Development Program was submitted to the Defense Department, articulating the five major systems that the Air Force wanted to pursue in space: ballistic test and related systems, manned hypersonic research (including the North American X-15), the Boeing X-20 Dyna-Soar orbital glider (to include reconnaissance, interceptor, and bomber variants), the WS-117L Advanced Reconnaissance System (to include a crewed military strategic space station), and the Lunex Project to put an Air Force base on the Moon.

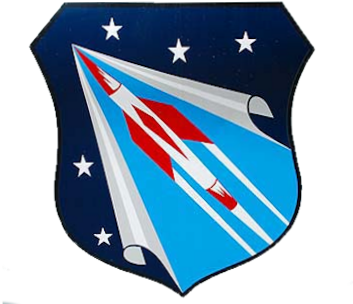
Shield of Air Research and Development Command, the major command responsible for Air Force space programs

DARPA was established on 7 February 1958. In taking over defense space programs it aimed to reduce interservice rivalry, raise the profile of space, and reduce redundancy. DARPA did not operate its own laboratories or personnel, but rather directed programs, assigning them to the different service components to perform the actual development. Projects transferred from the services to DARPA included Operation Argus, a Navy exoatmospheric nuclear detonation testing program, the Navy's Project Vanguard and other satellite and outer space programs, the High Performance Solid Propellants program, the Navy's Minitrack doppler fence, Army and Air Force ballistic missile defense projects, studies of the effects of space weapons employment on military electronic systems, Project Orion, an Air Force program on nuclear bomb-propelled space vehicles, and the WS-117L Advanced Reconnaissance System, which it split into three different programs: the Sentry reconnaissance component, the Missile Defense Alarm System (MIDAS) infrared sensor component, and the Discoverer program, which was a cover for the joint Air Force-Central Intelligence Agency Corona reconnaissance satellite. DARPA redistributed the sounding rockets and ground instrumentation for Project Argus to Air Force Special Weapons Command and the Air Force Cambridge Research Center, weapons systems to control hostile satellites, Project Orion, studies of the effects of space weapons employment on military electronic systems, the WS-117L programs, high energy and liquid hydrogen-liquid oxygen propellent, reentry studies, and Project SCORE (previously an Army satellite communications program) to Air Research and Development Command, the Pioneer lunar probe program to the Air Force Ballistic Missile Division, and the Saturn I, meteorological satellite, and inflatable sphere program to the Army Ordnance Missile Command.

DARPA's techniques were highly unsettling to leaders across all of the military services, as they directly dealt with subordinated service commands, bypassing the traditional chain of command. The agency had a complicated relationship with the Air Force, which sought to be the sole service for military space, however, DARPA consistently awarded it 80% of all military space programs and championed its program of putting a military man in space, awarding it development responsibility for crewed military spaceflight in February 1958. The Man in Space Soonest program was ultimately geared towards putting military astronauts on the Moon and returning them to Earth. The Army and Navy, without the sponsorship of DARPA, still held ambitions for crewed military spaceflight. The Army Ballistic Missile Agency proposed Project Adam, in which a man would be launched on a sub-orbital trajectory on a Juno II rocket, however it received no support, being liked to "about the same technical value as the circus stunt of shooting a young lady from a cannon" by NACA director Hugh Latimer Dryden and was outright rejected by the Defense Department. The Navy proposed Manned Earth Reconnaissance I, however it appeared "too bold for its day." The Air Force decided to cooperate with DARPA in order to gain development responsibility, and ultimately operational responsibility for all military space programs. DARPA was the sole national space agency for much of 1958, and carried out presidentially directed civil space mission, such as the Pioneer program of lunar probes, with military resources such as Air Force Thor-Able and Army Juno II rockets.

The establishment of NASA in 1958 decimated the Army and Navy space programs, cementing the Air Force's place as the lead military space service.

The National Aeronautics and Space Administration (NASA) was established on 29 July 1958 as the United States' civil space agency. Eisenhower always intended to have parallel civil and military space programs, only temporarily putting civil space programs under DARPA. NASA was primarily formed from the National Advisory Committee for Aeronautics (NACA) and began operations on 1 October 1958. It gained 7,000 personnel and the Langley Research Center, Ames Research Center, Lewis Research Center (now John H. Glenn Research Center), the High-Speed Flight Station, and the Wallops Flight Facility from NACA. The bulk of NASA's space program, however, was absorbed from the DARPA and the armed forces. The Navy space program, mostly run for civil research, was given up willingly, with NASA absorbing Project Vanguard, including 400 Naval Research Laboratory personnel and its Minitrack space tracking network. The Air Force Ballistic Missile Division transferred its Man in Space Soonest program, becoming the core of Project Mercury, and the Pioneer program lunar probe missions. DARPA also transferred over responsibility for special engines, special components for space systems, Project Argus, satellite tracking and monitoring systems, satellite communication relay, metrological reporting, navigation aid systems, and the NOTS Program to get images of the far side of the Moon. The Army's space program, however, was considered by NASA Administrator T. Keith Glennan, to be the most valuable source of space resources and was decimated by the transfer. Major General John Medaris, commander of the Army Ordnance Missile Command, very publicly fought the transfer, but nearly the entirety of the Army Ballistic Missile Agency, to include von Braun's Saturn I team at Redstone Arsenal (which would become the Marshall Space Flight Center) and the Jet Propulsion Laboratory were transferred to NASA, completely crushing any hope of an independent Army space program.

Aside from NASA, the biggest winner of the transfer was the Air Force Ballistic Missile Division, having seen its rivals in the Army and Navy completely decimated. The only programs the Air Force had had to give up were an independent Air Force crewed military program and scientific lunar probes. AFBMD leadership quickly perceived that the best way to enhance their dominance was to cooperate with NASA and make themselves invaluable partners to the new organization, providing space launch, facilities, and space launch vehicles. DARPA's power as an independent agency took a significant hit when Congress passed the Defense Reorganization Act of 1958, creating the Director of Defense Research and Engineering (DDR&E), which would grant the services more authority in space than DARPA did.

=== Air Force gains the military space mission ===
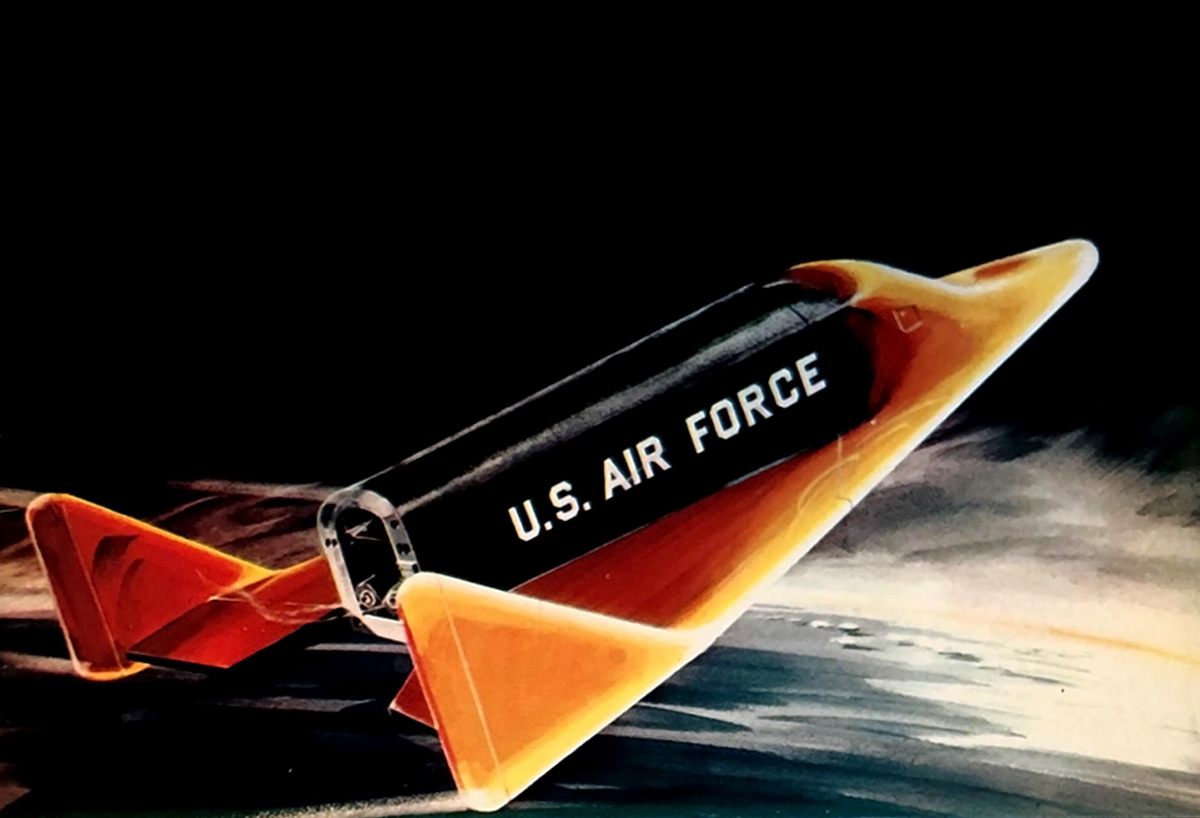
The Boeing X-20 Dyna-Soar was intended to be the world's first spaceplane, serving as an interceptor, bomber, and reconnaissance craft.

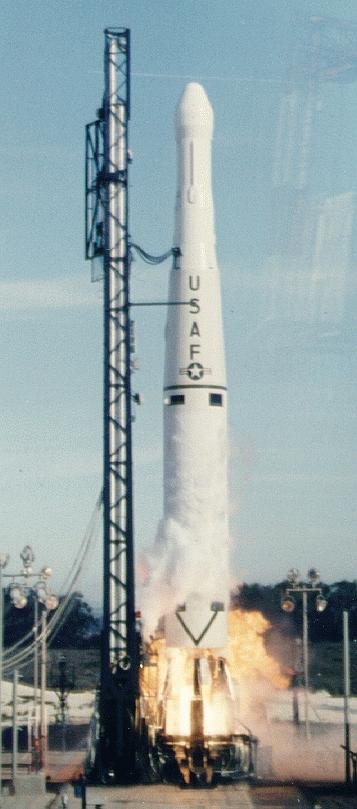
Launch of a Transit navigation satellite on a Thor-Ablestar

In February 1959, the deputy chief of staff of the Air Force for plans suggested that Air Force weaknesses in space organization, operations, and research and development all stemmed from its early failure to develop a coordinated space program. To become the dominant service in space, the Air Force should demonstrate successful stewardship and push forward to create its own space program, rather than just request missions and roles from DARPA, while at the same time improving service relationships with DARPA and NASA. The Air Force lobbied Congress, the Defense Department, and NASA intensively, relying heavily on its rationale that it was an Aerospace service and that the missions it intended to perform in space were a logical extension of its atmospheric responsibilities. In Spring 1959, the Air Force released twelve major military uses of space:

1. Military Reconnaissance satellites utilizing, optical, infrared, and electromagnetic instrumentation
2. Satellites for weather observation
3. Military Communications satellites
4. Satellites for electronic countermeasures
5. Satellite aids for navigation
6. Manned maintenance and resupply outer space vehicles
7. Manned defensive outer space vehicles and bombardment satellites
8. Manned lunar station
9. Satellite defense system
10. Manned detection, warning, and reconnaissance space vehicle
11. Manned bombardment space vehicle or space base
12. Target drone satellite

Five of these missions (photographic reconnaissance, electronic reconnaissance, infrared reconnaissance, mapping and charting, and space environmental forecasting and observing) had received approval as Air Force General Operational Requirements and represented missions previously identified and analyzed by RAND. The Air Staff released an analysis on constraints that prohibited the Air Force from implementing its aerospace force policy, identifying NASA's responsibility for the scientific space area and DARPA's responsibility for the military space area as key issues. Specifically the Air Staff faulted DARPA for assigning system development to a service on the basis of existing capability, but without regard for existing or likely space mission and support roles. Rather, the Air Staff felt that DARPA should focus on policy decisions and leave project engineering to the lowest level at the AFBMD. It also argued that the Air Force should be responsible for providing common interest items, such as space launch boosters and satellites, to NASA, enabling the civil agency to focus its budget and efforts entirely on scientific endeavors. This analysis was supported by General Schriever and the AFBMD, who found his command becoming overburdened with DARPA programs and NASA requirements. In April 1959, General Schriever testified before congress that the Air Force's responsibilities for strategic offensive and defensive missions would be, in part, conducted by ballistic missiles, satellites, and spacecraft. Schriever argued that DARPA should be dissolved, that the Director of Defense Research and Engineering should provide policy guidance and service responsibility, and that space research and development control be returned to the military services.

The Air Force's arguments for autonomy from DARPA were bolstered by the success of major AFBMD programs, including the former elements of the WS-117L Advanced Reconnaissance System. The Samos reconnaissance satellite, formerly known as Sentry, was to be launched using an Atlas-Agena and would be operated by Strategic Air Command to collect photographic and electromagnetic reconnaissance data. The Missile Defense Alarm System (MIDAS), also launched by Atlas-Agena and using infrared sensors, was intended be under the operational command of the United States—Canadian North American Air Defense Command (NORAD) and the U.S.—only Continental Air Defense Command, operated by the Air Force's Air Defense Command to provide early warning of a Soviet nuclear attack. The Air Force also continued development of the joint Air Force-Central Intelligence Agency Corona program, under the public name of Project Discoverer, which used Thor-Agena boosters launched from Vandenberg Air Force Base. The Air Force Ballistic Missile Division also provided launch support to the other services, launching the Navy's Transit navigation satellites, designed to support its ballistic missile submarines, and the Army's Notus communications satellite. AFBMD continued its development of boosters, including the Thor, Atlas, and Titan space launch vehicles.

One of DARPA's most important programs was the Space Detection and Tracking System (SPADATS), initially started under the name Project Sheppard, to integrate the space surveillance systems of the various services. Hurried due to the launch of Sputnik 1, the Air Force contributed Spacetrack (initially Project Harvest Moon), which provided the Interim National Space Surveillance Control Center at Hanscom Field, bringing together the MIT Lincoln Laboratory's Millstone Hill Radar, the Stanford Research Institute, and an ARDC test radar at Laredo Air Force Station, and the Smithsonian Astrophysical Observatory's Baker-Nunn camera, with the Air Force responsible for devising the development plan for future operational space surveillance systems. The Navy was responsible for operating the Navy Space Surveillance System (NAVSPASUR) from Naval Support Activity Dahlgren, and the Army was assigned to develop Doploc, a doppler radar network, however the Army dropped out of the project. There was strong disagreement between the Air Force and Navy over who would operate the system, with the Navy preferring to operate it as a separate system, while the Air Force wanted to have it under the operational command of NORAD and Continental Air Defense Command, with day to day operations handled by Air Defense Command. By mid-1959, the topic became so contentious that the Joint Chiefs of Staff had to decide the issue, when it became part of a larger discussion on service roles and missions.

The Air Force continued to provide significant support for NASA, constructing infrastructure for the space agency at Patrick Air Force Base and Cape Canaveral Air Force Station, as well as providing Thor-Able boosters and launch support to the Pioneer program of lunar probes and Thor-Able and Thor-Delta boosters and launch support to the Television Infrared Observation Satellite (Tiros) weather observation satellites. The Air Force Ballistic Missile Division also supported the development of the Centaur high-energy stage, which it intended to use to support the cancelled Advent communications satellite project. Among the most important support the AFBMD provided NASA was for Project Mercury, its first human spaceflight program. It provided Atlas LV-3B launch vehicles for orbital flights, launch support, and Aviation medicine officers. Much of its aerospace medical knowledge was gained from medical personnel who had served with the German Luftwaffe during the Second World War and had defected to the United States. The world's first Department of Space Medicine was established at the United States Air Force School of Aviation Medicine (later renamed to School of Aerospace Medicine) in February 1949 by Hubertus Strughold, who coined the term space medicine. Air Force medical personnel would go on to conduct a variety of experiments on weightlessness.

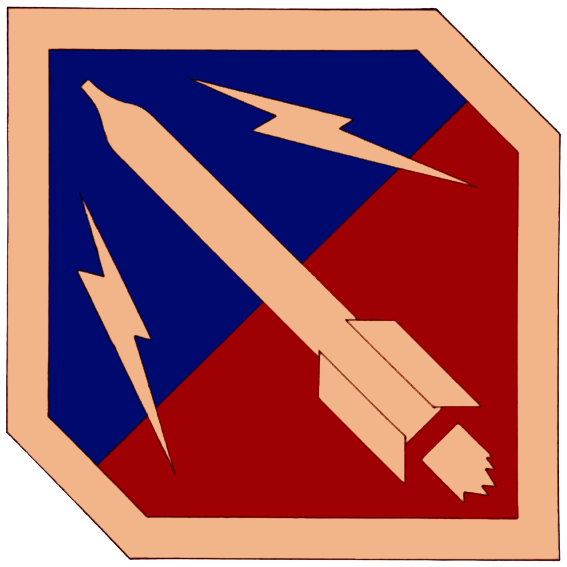
For much of the 1950s, the Army Ballistic Missile Agency and General Medaris were in direct competition with the Air Force Ballistic Missile Division and General Schriever.

Although NASA was responsible for most crewed spaceflight, AFBMD continued with the development of the Boeing X-20 Dyna-Soar orbital glider. The X-20 evolved from the rocket plane tests of the 1950s, such as the Bell X-1 and North American X-15. It was created by merging together the Rocket Bomber, Brass Bell high altitude reconnaissance system, and Hywards boost-glide vehicle on 30 April 1957. It was intended to be the first true spaceplane, replacing atmospheric bombers and reconnaissance aircraft. It was considered using the Saturn I booster with the X-20, as was proposed by von Braun a number of times, but this was rejected due to concerns that that project would be transferred to NASA, as was the Man in Space Soonest program.

Interservice rivalries over space persisted in 1959. Army Major General Medaris testified before Congress that General Schriever and the Air Force had a long history of noncooperation with the Army Ballistic Missile Agency. General Schriever submitted a long rebuttal, but the charge was not withdrawn. In April 1959, Admiral Arleigh Burke, Chief of Naval Operations, made a bold bid for a major share of the space enterprise for the Navy, proposing the establishment of a joint Defense Astronautical Agency to the Joint Chiefs of Staff. This was supported by General Maxwell D. Taylor, Chief of Staff of the Army, under the premise that space transcended the interests of any one service, however it was opposed by chief of staff of the Air Force General Thomas D. White, who been stating that space was the domain of the Air Force. This Army-Navy effort for a Defense Astronautical Agency compelled General Schriever to push for the Air Force to acquire as much of the military space mission as it could, stating to the secretary of defense that the Air Force had been operating in aerospace since its beginning in mission areas of strategic attack, defense against attack, and supporting systems that enhanced both and that the best way to organize these forces would be to unify them under the Air Force. Schriever went on to state that Army and Navy requirements would be satisfied by the Air Force as the prime operating agency of the military satellite force, much as it was in the air. Service tensions were further strained by DARPA director Roy Johnson's proposal to establish a tri-service Mercury Task Force to support NASA, rather than have the Air Force be the sole supporting service. The Army and Navy supported a Defense Astronautical Agency and joint Mercury Task Force, while the Air Force argued they should be integrated into its already preexisting command structure. Ultimately the secretary of defense decided that a Defense Astronautical Agency was not needed at this time to provide operational control of all space forces, denied the request for the Mercury Task Force, instead appointing Air Force Major General Donald Norton Yates, commander of the Air Force Missile Test Center, to direct military support for NASA crewed missions, and assigned the Air Force responsibility for the development, production, and launching of space boosters. Satellite operations responsibilities would be assigned to services on a case-by-case basis, however, the Air Force received the majority of these responsibilities. The concept behind the Defense Astronautical Agency as a joint space command would be realized 25 years later as United States Space Command.

On 30 December 1959, the Advance Research Projects Agency's status as the sole controlling entity of military space programs was brought to a close as it was retasked as an operating research and development agency under the Director of Defense Research and Development. Responsibilities for military space programs were returned to the individual services, with DARPA only tasked with a few advanced programs.

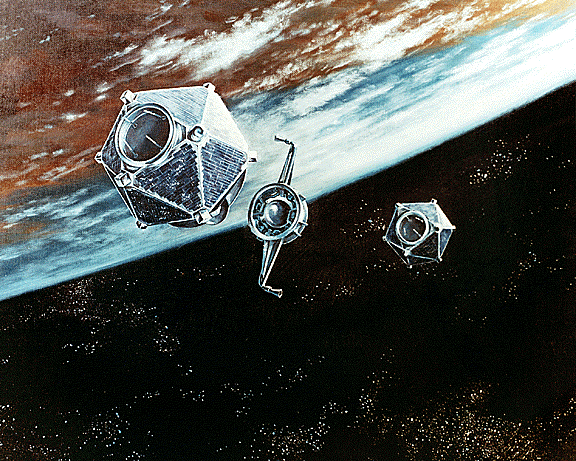
Separation of the Vela 5A and Vela 5B nuclear detonation detection satellites

On 1 May 1960, a Central Intelligence Agency Lockheed U-2 was shot down over the Soviet Union, limiting reconnaissance flights to the edges of the Soviet Union and sparking Congress to increase funding for space based reconnaissance such as Samos and MIDAS. On 10 June 1960, President Eisenhower directed secretary of defense Thomas S. Gates Jr. to reassess space-based intelligence requirements, concluding that Samos, the Corona program, and U-2 all represented national assets and that they should be organized under a civilian agency in the Defense Department, not a single military service. On 31 August 1960, secretary of the Air Force Dudley C. Sharp created the Office of Missile and Satellite Systems under the Assistant Secretary of the Air Force to coordinate Air Force, Central Intelligence Agency, Navy, and National Security Agency intelligence reconnaissance activities. On 6 September 1961, the Office of Missile and Satellite Systems became the National Reconnaissance Office, taking over all space reconnaissance programs, such as Samos and Corona. Only MIDAS and the Vela nuclear detonation detection satellites remained in the Air Force's satellite inventory.

On 3 June 1960, the Air Force created the Aerospace Corporation to provide it with technical space competency as a federally funded research and development center, adjacent to the Air Force Ballistic Missile Division headquarters in Inglewood, California. By the end of its first year, the Aerospace Corporation had 1,700 employees and was responsible for 12 space programs. It would grow to provide general systems engineering and technical direction for every Air Force and Space Force missile and space program.

=== Kennedy Administration and establishment of Air Force Systems Command ===
The election of John F. Kennedy to president of the United States put a renewed focus on the space program, both military and civil. President Kennedy appointed Jerome Wiesner to chair a committee to review the organization of military and civil space. The Wiesner Report criticize the fractionalized military space program, recommending that one agency or military service be made responsible for all military space, and stated that the Air Force was the logical choice, as it was already responsible for 90% of the support and resources for other space agencies and that the Air Force was the "principal resource for the development and operation of future space systems, except those of a purely scientific nature assigned by law to NASA." Shortly after taking office, secretary of defense Robert McNamara designated the Air Force as the executive agent for military space, assigning it responsibility for "research, development, test, and engineering of Department of Defense space development programs or projects," while still permitting each service to conduct preliminary research and asserted that operational assignment of each space system to a service would be done on a case-by-case basis.

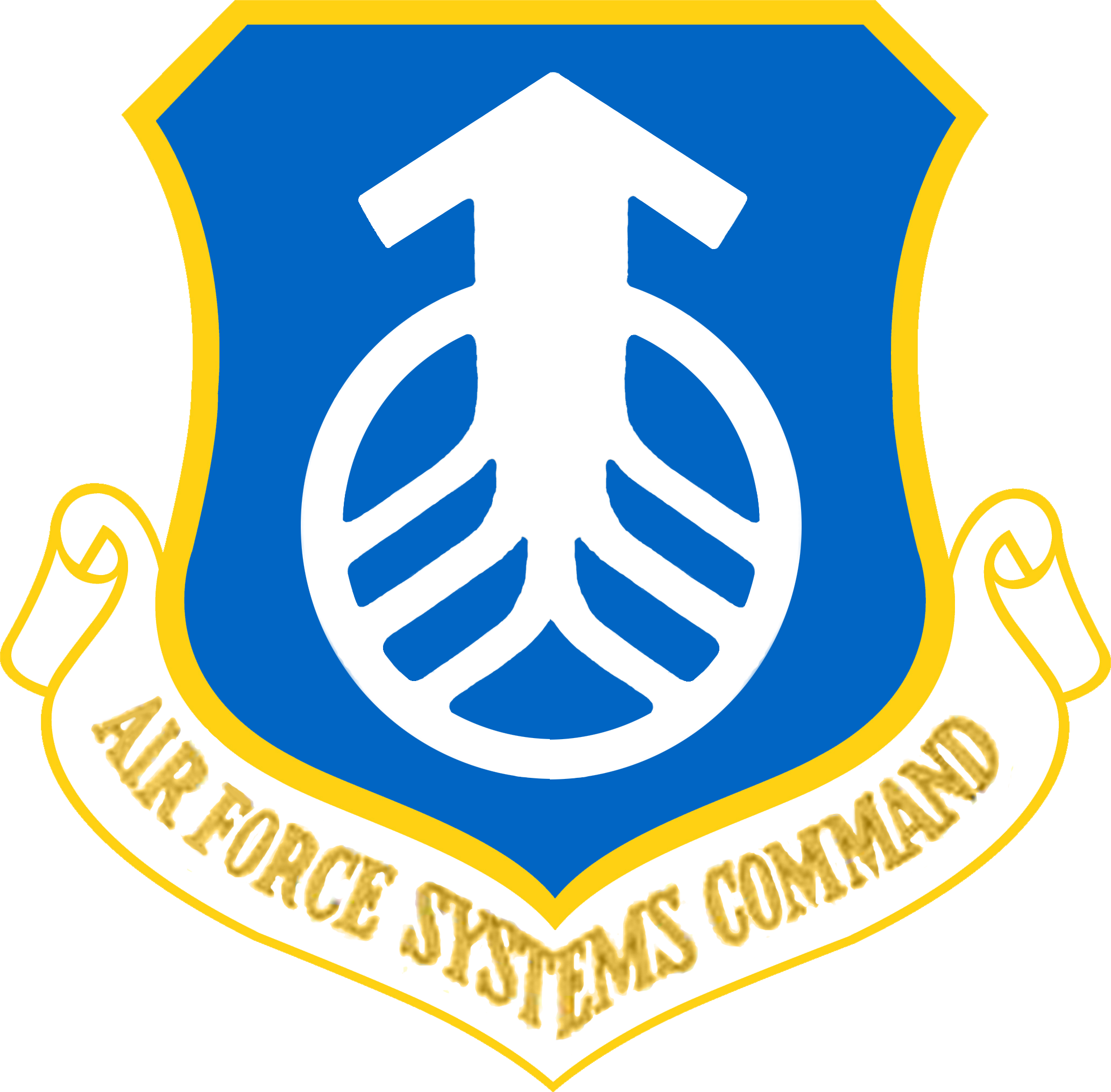
The creation of Air Force Systems Command under General Schriever reorganized space research, development, and acquisitions under a single Space Systems Division.

In early 1961, deputy secretary of defense Roswell Gilpatric contacted chief of staff of the Air Force General White and promised the Air Force major responsibility for the space mission if he "put his house in order." Gilpatric's main concern was that space responsibility was split, between research and development under Air Research and Development Command and procurement under Air Materiel Command. Secretary Gilpatric's views were informed by General Schriever, now commander of Air Research and Development Command, who had told him that the Air Force could not handle the military space mission unless one command held responsibility for research and development, system testing, and acquisition of space systems. General Schreiver held these views for a number of years, however the issue gained a pressing urgency by 1960, as Air Research and Development Command's Air Force Ballistic Missile Division and Air Materiel Command's Ballistic Missiles Center competed for resources and management focus as the demand for both space and missile systems became more pressing. In September 1960, General White authorized General Schriever to begin reorganization, keeping his space programs in Los Angeles, while moving ballistic missile functions to Norton Air Force Base, however General Schriever felt it was insufficient and he was authorized to form a planning task force. Colonel Otto Glasser, later a lieutenant general, developed the reorganization plan resulting in the reorganization of Air Research and Development Command as Air Force Systems Command (AFSC) on 1 April 1961, giving the organization responsibility for all research, development and acquisition of aerospace and missile systems. On the same day Air Materiel Command was reorganized as Air Force Logistics Command, removing its production functions and responsible for maintenance and supply only. Lieutenant General Schriever, commander of Air Research and Development Command, was promoted to general and made the first commander of Air Force Systems Command.

Air Force Systems Command was organized into four subordinate divisions: the Aeronautical Systems Division (ASD), the Air Force Ballistic Missile Division (BMD), the Electronic Systems Division, and the Space Systems Division (SSD). The Space Systems Division was established in Los Angeles, absorbing the space elements of the Air Force Ballistic Missile Division and Air Force Ballistic Missiles Center. The Ballistic Missile Division was established at Norton Air Force Base and absorbed the ballistic missile elements of the Air Force Ballistic Missile Division and Air Force Ballistic Missiles Center, as well as the Army Corps of Engineers Ballistic Missile Construction Office. In addition the Office of Aerospace Research was established on the Air Staff at the Pentagon.

The Space Systems Division quickly established itself, and on 20 March 1961 the Gardner Report was submitted to General Schreiver. In it, Trevor Gardner stated that the United States could not overtake the Soviet Union in space for three to five years without a significant increase in space investment by the Defense Department. As well, he stated that the line between military and civil space would need to be crossed in a lunar landing program that would land astronauts on the Moon between 1967 and 1970. Such an effort would produce important technologies, industries, and lessons learned for both military and civil space programs.

On 12 April 1961, Soviet cosmonaut Yuri Gagarin became the first human to enter space, launching on the spacecraft Vostok 1. This sparked Secretary MacNamara to direct Herbert York, DDR&E, and secretary of the Air Force Eugene M. Zuckert to assess the national space programs in terms of defense interests, specifically considering the findings of the Gardner Report. The task force study took place at the Space Systems Division and was led by Major General Joseph R. Holzapple, Air Force Systems Command assistant deputy commander for aerospace systems. The Holzapple Report, submitted to the secretary of defense on 1 May 1961, called for a NASA-led lunar landing initiative, with significant Air Force support.

== Space forces in the Cold War (1961–1982) ==
The Air Force being designated the Defense Department executive agent for space and the creation of the Space Systems Division in 1961 solidified the service's status as the dominant military space power. In May 1961, acting in part on the Holzapple Report, the Kennedy Administration assigned NASA the responsibility for the lunar landing mission, however the Space Systems Division was expected to continue to provide personnel, launch vehicles, and ground support to the civil space agency.

In 1961, major space programs such as Samos and Spacetrack were achieving operational capability, while developmental programs such as MIDAS and the Project SAINT satellite inspector received additional funding. This was in large part due to President Kennedy's push for an integrated national space program, rather than dividing efforts between DOD and NASA, and in Spring 1961, the Air Force was responsible for 90% of military space efforts.

=== Crewed military spaceflight programs and military support to NASA ===
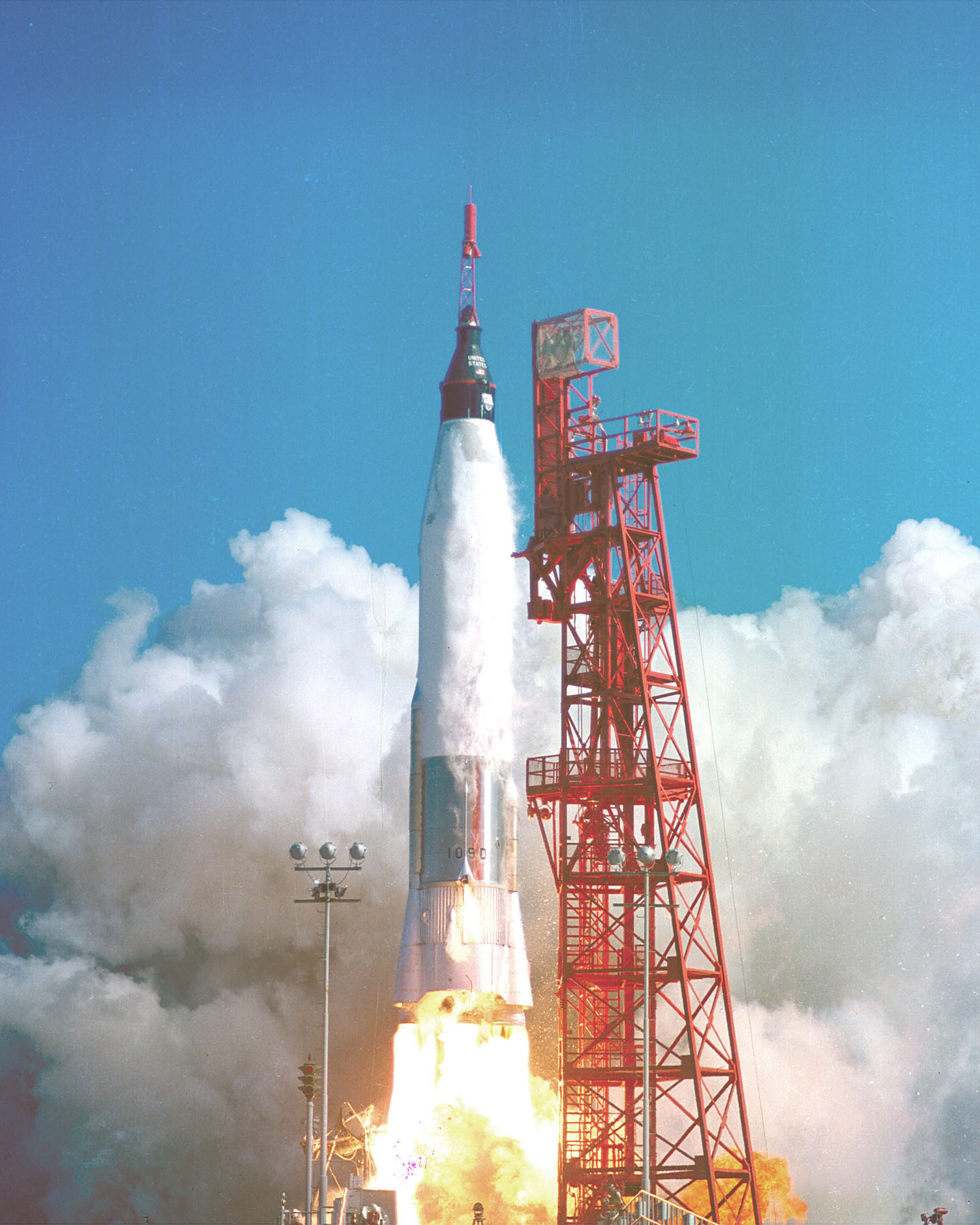
Launch of Mercury-Atlas 6 with John Glenn, becoming the first American to orbit the Earth

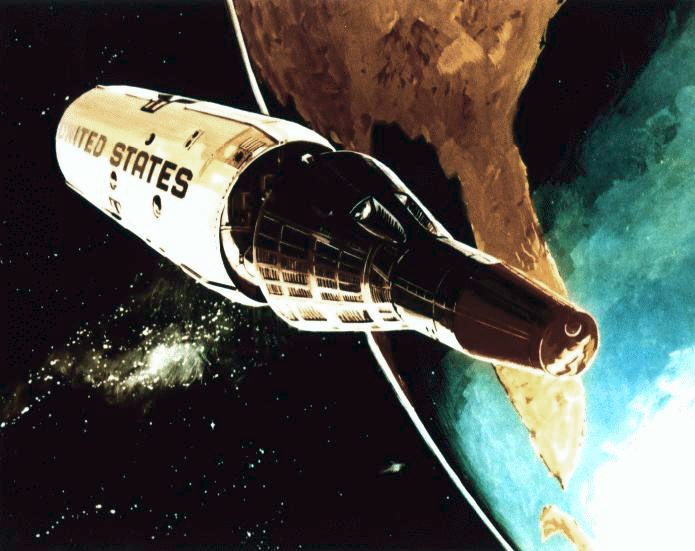
The launched of the Manned Orbiting Laboratory would have resulted in a crewed military space mission.

Alarmed by the orbital flights of Soviet Air Forces cosmonauts Yuri Gagarin in Vostok 1 and Gherman Titov in Vostok 2, the Air Force redoubled its push for a crewed military space program. General Curtis LeMay, Chief of Staff of the Air Force, noted how use of airplanes in the First World War quickly moved from unarmed reconnaissance to combat, and that it would be naïve to believe that the same trends could not expected in space. This view soon gained support, and the Boeing X-20 Dyna-Soar program benefitted. In April the Air Force was authorized to eliminate the suborbital phrase and go ahead with an orbital flight program, using the Titan III booster.

On 21 September 1961, the Air Force's first formal Space Plan was completed, calling for an expansive, "aggressive military space program." It recommended continuing the Discoverer/Corona program, MIDAS, Samos, and Blue Scout research vehicle at their present pace, while accelerating efforts to develop orbital weapons, anti-satellite systems, and Bambi, the space-based anti-missile concept. The Space Systems Division was developing the Titan IIIC space launch vehicle, which was capable of launching payloads up to 25,000 pounds into orbit. The Space Systems Division and NASA also closely cooperated on the Apollo Program, jointly selecting the launch location at Kennedy Space Center. An agreement between NASA Administrator James E. Webb and Deputy Defense Secretary Roswell Gilpatric made NASA responsible for the costs of the lunar program, while the Space Systems Division would serve as the range manager. In February 1962, the Department of Defense designated the Air Force as the executive agent for NASA support.

The Space Systems Division provided close support to NASA's Project Mercury, providing three of the Mercury Seven astronauts, launch facilities (Cape Canaveral Launch Complex 5 and 14), RM-90 Blue Scout II and Atlas LV-3B launch vehicles, and recovery forces. The Space Systems Division was planning to provide similar support to Project Gemini and was supporting 14 NASA programs with 96 research and development officers attached. In April 1962, the position of deputy to the commander of Air Force Systems Command for Manned Space Flight was established at NASA Headquarters, consisting of personnel from all three services.

On 11 June 1962, The New York Times broke the story about the SAINT program, creating a political firestorm by claiming that the Air Force was intent on weaponizing space. The public blowback was tremendous, resulting in greater scrutiny from the Defense Department and the White House on military space programs. In the 1962 Air Force Space Plan request, the only programs that received significant funding were the Military Orbital Development System (MODS) space station, Blue Gemini experimentation program, MIDAS, SAINT, the X-20 Dyna-Soar, and Titan III launch vehicle. The MODS experimental space station was to be launched on a Titan IIIC booster and the Blue Gemini program focused specifically on testing rendezvous, docking, and personnel transfer functions, however there were concerns that Blue Gemini could endanger the X-20 Dyna-Soar. Both MODS and Blue Gemini were cancelled by Defense Secretary McNamara, instead requiring the Space Systems Division to work through NASA's Project Gemini.

Project Gemini was managed by NASA, but had a joint Gemini Program Planning Board co-chaired by NASA's associate administrator and the assistant secretary of the Air Force for research and development. Like in Project Mercury, the Space Systems Division provided significant support, including nine of the sixteen Gemini astronauts, Cape Canaveral Air Force Station Launch Complex 19, Atlas-Agena and Titan II GLV launch vehicles, and United States Air Force Pararescue recovery forces.

Even before the Apollo Program started, in 1963 both NASA and the Space Systems Division were contemplating future space programs, with NASA focusing on the Apollo Applications Program to create a space station. Secretary McNamara continued to cut Space Systems Division programs, reducing funding for MIDAS and reducing SAINT to a definitions study, reorienting anti-satellite and missile defense systems on ground-based radars and missiles. In on 10 December 1963, Secretary McNamara authorized the Space Systems Division to begin development on the Manned Orbiting Laboratory (MOL), an orbital military reconnaissance space station launched on a Titan IIIM from Vandenberg Air Force Base Space Launch Complex 6, however at the cost of canceling the Boeing X-20 Dyna-Soar orbital fighter. In addition to scientific experimentations, MOL was to provide surveillance of the Soviet Union, naval reconnaissance while over water, and satellite inspection of non-U.S. spacecraft. It was approved for full scale development on 25 August 1965 by President Lyndon B. Johnson, but cancelled in June 1969 as Vietnam War costs escalated.

General Schriever's retirement in 1966 also marked a change in Air Force space organization. His successor, General James Ferguson, reorganized Air Force Systems Command, reconsolidating the Ballistic Missile Division and Space Systems Division, in large part due to the BMD's lessened responsibilities, into the Space and Missile Systems Organization (SAMSO) on 1 July 1967. SAMSO, like the SSD before it, continued to provide support to the Apollo Program, providing seventeen of the thirty-two astronauts, Cape Canaveral Air Force Station Launch Complex 34, and recovery forces.

=== Deployment of military satellite communications systems ===
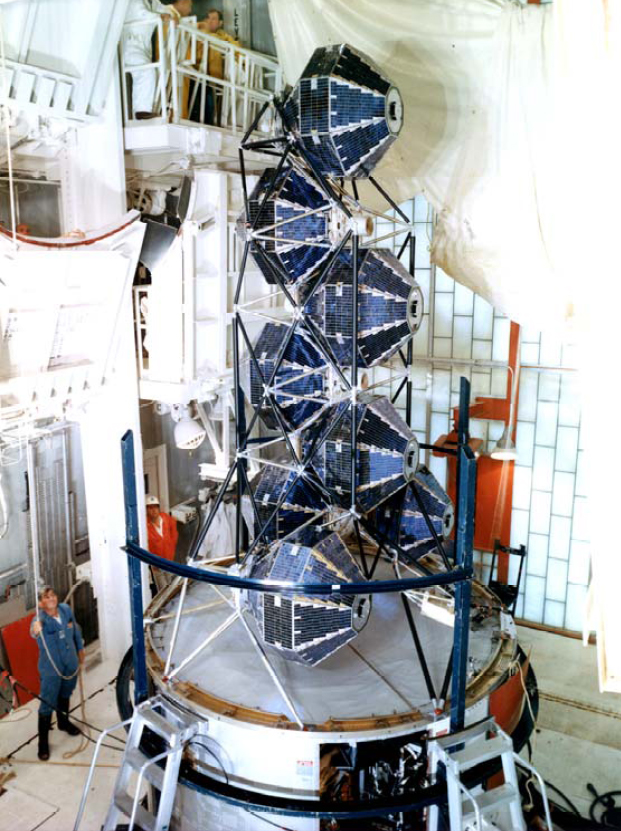
Initial Defense Communication Satellite Program spacecraft in a payload stack

After the Second World War, U.S. military communications efforts aimed for longer range, greater security, higher capacity, and improved reliability. Science fiction author Arthur C. Clarke first wrote about the potential of satellite communications in 1945. Immediately after the war, the Army Signal Corps experimented with Earth–Moon–Earth communication through Project Diana, using the Moon and Venus as signal reflectors. The Navy also experimented with this method through the Communication Moon Relay, creating two-way voice communications between San Diego, Hawaii, and Washington.

In July 1958, the Advanced Research Projects Agency assigned Project SCORE, the world's first communications satellite, to the Army. On 18 December 1958, it was launched by an Air Force SM-65B Atlas, broadcasting a Christmas greeting from President Eisenhower in the very high frequency (VHF) band. In October 1960, the Army Signal Corps launched Courier 1B, operating in the ultra high frequency (UHF) band. The Air Force Ballistic Missile Division attempted to produce an artificial ionosphere to transmit signals as part of Project West Ford, however it was rendered obsolete by advances in communications satellites. DARPA began planning for a truly strategic geosynchronous communication system in 1958, assigning the Air Force Ballistic Missile Division responsibility for the booster and spacecraft and the Army Signal Corps the communications element. Initially consisting of three repeater satellite programs, in September 1959 the secretary of defense transferred responsibility for communications satellite management from DARPA to the Army. In February 1960, the three programs were combined into Project Advent, which was assigned to the Army in September that year. However, the Army would not have operational responsibility for military satellite communications, as the Defense Department was unifying the strategic communications systems of the Army, Navy, and Air Force as part of the Defense Communications System, operated by the Defense Communications Agency, which was established on 12 May 1960. Project Advent was considered to be a very ambitious program, with the first tranche of satellites launched into 5,600 mile inclined orbits by AFBMD Atlas-Agena launch vehicles, with the second tranche launched into geostationary orbits by AFBMD Atlas-Centaurs. Given cost overruns and technological breakthroughs in smaller satellites, Project Advent was cancelled on 23 May 1962.

With Project Advent's failure, the Defense Department turned to the Air Force-aligned the Aerospace Corporation, which had been developing two alternatives. In Summer 1962, the Space Systems Division got authorization to proceed with the development of the Initial Defense Communication Satellite Program (IDCSP) to provided communications in the super high frequency (SHF) bandwidth. Unlike in Project Advent, the Space Systems Division would have complete control over the spacecraft and booster, with the Army Satellite Communications Agency only had authority over the ground segment, with the Defense Communications Agency responsible for unifying the Army and Air Force efforts. The Space Systems Division also received authorization to develop a second system, the Advanced Defense Communications Satellite Program (ADCSP), at the same time. The need for IDCSP was questioned, as the Defense Department and Secretary McNamara wanted to study DOD leasing bandwidth from the new COMSAT corporation. On 15 July 1964, after failed negotiations with COMSAT and concerns about hosting military payloads on civil satellites that could be used by foreign powers, Secretary McNamara opted to push forward with the more secure and reliable military satellite communications system. The development of the Titan IIIC prompted a change from medium earth orbits to near-synchronous orbits for the IDCSP.

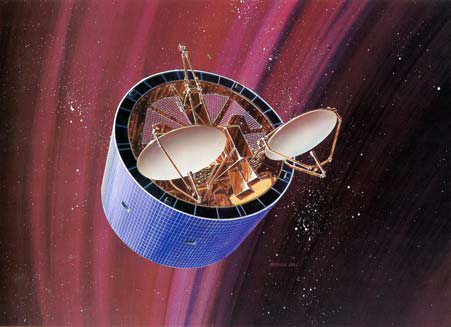
A Defense Satellite Communications System Phase II satellite in orbit

The IDSCP was originally intended only for experimentation, but was so successful that it became an operational satellite constellation. The first seven satellites were launched on 16 June 1966 by the Space Systems Division Titan IIIC. The second launch, of eight IDSCP satellites, were launched on 26 August 1966, however the failure of a fairing resulted in the loss of the launch vehicle and payloads. The third launch occurred on 18 January 1967, placing eight satellites into orbit, with a 1 July 1967 launch, the first by SAMSO, placing three more satellites into orbit. This launch also placed into orbit a number of test satellites, including the Navy's DODGE gravity gradient experiment, the DATS satellite, and Lincoln Experimental Satellite-5. The final eight satellites were launched into orbit on 13 June 1968, creating a constellation of 26 satellites. When the Defense Communications Agency declared the IDCSP system operational, it changed its name to the Initial Defense Satellite Communications System (IDSCS).

By mid-1968, 36 fixed and mobile ground terminals, the responsibility of the Army, completed the satellite communications system. Originally used for the Army Signal Corps' Project Advent and later co-opted for NASA's Syncom satellite program, two fixed AN/FSC-9 ground terminals, one located at Camp Roberts, California and the other at Fort Dix began relaying IDSCS satellite data. Mobile terminals consisted of seven AN/TSC-54 terminals, thirteen AN/MSC-46 terminals, and six ship-based terminals. Ground terminal locations included Colorado, West Germany, Ethiopia, Hawaii, Guam, Australia, South Korea, Okinawa, the Philippines, South Vietnam, and Thailand. In 1967 the Air Force Space and Missile Systems Organization demonstrated the capability of the IDSCP at the 21st Armed Forces Communications and Electronics Association convention in Washington D.C., connecting Secretary of the Air Force Harold Brown directly with the Seventh Air Force commander in South Vietnam, General William W. Momyer. The Initial Defense Communications System later became known as the Defense Satellite Communications System Phase I (DSCS I). DSCS I became known for its reliability, and by 1971, fifteen of the twenty-six initial satellites, intended purely as an experiment, remained operational. By mid-1976, three continued to function, several years after their intended shutoff date. The DSCS I constellation provided the Defense Communications Agency good service for nearly 10 years. It served as the basic design for the British Skynet 1 satellites and NATO's satellite communications. Both were launched by a SAMSO Thor-Delta rockets.

Although DSCS I was superior to radio or cable communications, it remained limited in terms of channel capacity, user access, and overall coverage. Work began on the Defense Satellite Communications System Phase II (DSCS II) to satisfy the original intent of Project Advent and overcome these limitations. Preliminary work began at the Space Systems Division in 1964 as the Advanced Defense Communications Satellite Program, with the Defense Communications Agency awarding six concept study contracts in 1965, with procurement authorized in June 1968. The Space and Missile Systems Organization planned for a constellation of four satellites in geosynchronous orbit (one over the Indian Ocean, one over the Eastern Pacific Ocean, one over the Western Pacific Ocean, and one over the Atlantic Ocean), with two spare spacecraft. The Defense Communications Agency maintained overall control of the program, with the Air Force Space and Missile Systems Organization responsible for the spacecraft, Titan IIIC boosters, and operations from the Air Force Satellite Control Facility, while the Army Signal Corps was responsible for the ground-segment.

DSCS II was a major step forward in communications satellite design, with both broad area and narrow beam coverage. The first two satellites were launched from a Titan IIIC on 2 November 1971, placing one over the Atlantic Ocean and one over the Pacific Ocean. After redesigning due to failures in the initial tranche, the second set of satellites was launched on 13 December 1973 and the constellation was declared operational by the Defense Communications Agency in February 1974 with only two satellites on orbit. The third launch on 20 May 1975 had an anomaly in the Titan IIIC's guidance system which resulted in the spacecraft reentering the atmosphere and the DSCS II satellites were lost. The constellation was later completed, and by the 1980s DSCS II provided strategic communications through 46 ground terminals, the Diplomatic Telecommunications Service' 52 terminals, and the Ground Mobile Forces 31 tactical terminals. The last DSCS II satellite was decommissioned on 13 December 1993, however design of the Defense Satellite Communications System Phase III (DSCS III) began in 1974.

The Space Systems Division, and later SMSO, also provided support to a number of experimental satellites, predominantly the Lincoln Experimental Satellite series, which would often piggyback on military launch missions. SAMSO also contracted Hughes Aircraft Company for the TACSAT communications satellite, which provided both UHF and SHF communications. However, due to funding restrictions it was limited to a single spacecraft and launched on a Titan IIIC from Cape Kennedy Air Force Station on 9 February 1969. TACSAT supported the Apollo 9 recovery efforts, directly linking the USS Guadalcanal (LPH-7) with the White House. The Navy, impressed by the success of TACSAT, began development with SAMSO on the Fleet Satellite Communications System (FLTSATCOM). While the Navy provided funding and ground terminals, SAMSO served as the Navy's agent in spacecraft areas and received a portion of the spacecraft's capabilities, forming the Air Force Satellite Communications System (AFSATCOM), which was used to provide global communications for Single Integrated Operations Plan nuclear forces.

=== Military weather satellites ===
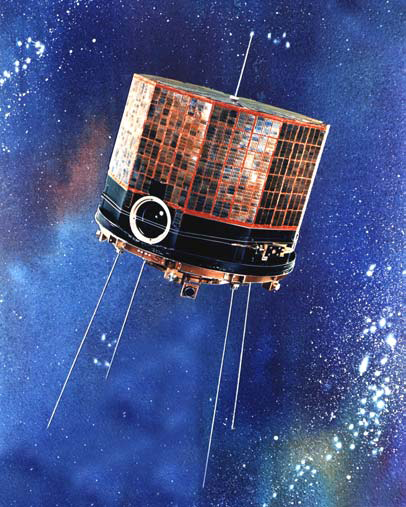
A Defense Meteorological Satellite Program Block I satellite in orbit

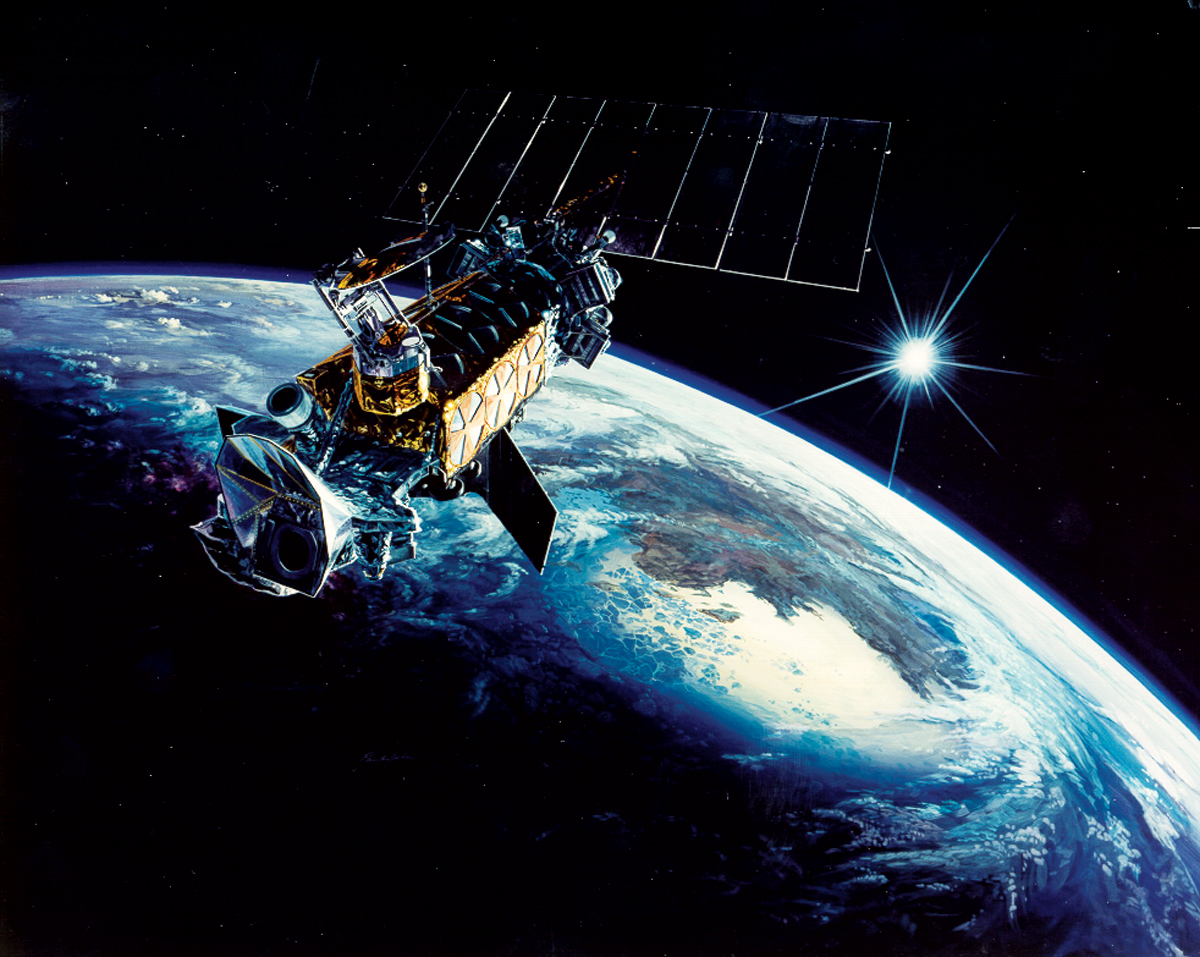
A Defense Meteorological Satellite Program Block 5 satellite in orbit

The idea of weather satellites had, like communications satellites, been imagined by early science fiction authors like Arthur C. Clarke. Weather forecasting had been a crucial military capability since ancient times, however rarely were meteorologists able to gather observations over land controlled by a hostile adversary and there was almost always a lack of coverage over the open ocean. Following the Second World War, the 1946 RAND report predicated that weather observations over enemy territories would be the most valuable capability provided by satellites. By 1961, the Space Systems Division and the Aerospace Corporation began studying requirements for military weather satellites, however NASA had received authority to develop weather satellites for all governmental users, including the military.

NASA's Television Infrared Observation Satellite (TIROS) was designed to provide weather observation data to the United States Weather Bureau, launching TIROS-1 from Cape Canaveral Air Force Station Launch Complex 17 on a Air Force Ballistic Missile Division Thor-Able booster on 1 April 1960. With the success of TIROS, the Department of Defense, Department of Commerce, and NASA convened to develop a single weather system that would satisfy the needs of both civilian and military users, agreeing to the National Operational Meteorological Satellite System in April 1961.

Ultimately, in 1963 the Aerospace Corporation recommended that the military develop its own weather satellite system. The Space Systems Division began development of the Defense Satellite Applications Program (DSAP). Because DSAP was intended to provide direct support to Strategic Air Command and the National Reconnaissance Office, its existence remained classified for a decade. However in April 1973 Secretary of the Air Force John L. McLucas decided that DOD's use of weather data during the Vietnam War, and the benefit of providing data to the Department of Commerce and wider scientific community warranted declassification of the system. In December 1973, it was renamed the Defense Meteorological Satellite Program (DMSP).

Initial DMSP satellites transmitted data to Fairchild Air Force Base, Washington and Loring Air Force Base, Maine, from there sent to the Air Force Global Weather Center at Offutt Air Force Base. Tactical data was passed to mission planners in Vietnam, while auroral data was given to the Air Force Cambridge Research Laboratory and the National Oceanic and Atmospheric Administration for scientific research. The fifth block of DMSP satellites were launched on Thor-Burner rockets into polar orbits and in 1973 it became a tri-service program, adding Army and Navy participation.

From February 1963 DMSP was operated by the 4000th Support Group, Strategic Air Command. The group was reassigned to the 1st Strategic Aerospace Division on 1 January 1966, changing its name but not the "4000" number in 1973 and 1981.

=== Development of the Global Positioning System ===
Satellite navigation systems were based upon radio navigation systems such as LORAN, however terrestrial systems could only provide positioning in two-dimensions at limited ranges, while space-based systems could provide up to three-dimesons, plus velocity, anywhere on the Earth. On 13 April 1960, and Air Force Ballistic Missile Division Thor-Ablestar launched the Navy's first Transit navigation satellite into orbit. Transit was designed to provide 600 feet accuracy for naval ships and ballistic missile submarines, however it was too slow and intermittent to provide the precise requirements needed for high-speed aircraft and ground launched missiles.

In 1963, the Aerospace Corporation prompted the Space Systems Division to begin work on Project 621B (Satellite System for Precise Navigation), which was intended to provide accurate, all-weather positioning data anywhere on Earth. At the same time, the Navy began work on Timation as a follow-on to Transit. The first Timation satellites were launched by the Space and Missile Systems Organization in 1967 and 1969. The Army also developed the SECOR satellite system. In 1968, the Defense Department organized the Navigation Satellite Executive Committee as a tri-service committee to coordinate the various programs. Air Force Colonel Bradford Parkinson worked to combine SAMSO's Project 621B and the Navy's Timation program. On 17 April 1973, Deputy Secretary of Defense Bill Clements unified them under the SAMSO-led Defense Navigation Satellite Development Program. The unified program adopted the Air Force's signal structure and frequencies and the Navy's orbital deployment plan and usage of atomic clocks. On 2 May 1974, the program was renamed the Navstar Global Positioning System (GPS).

=== Deployment of space-based missile warning systems ===
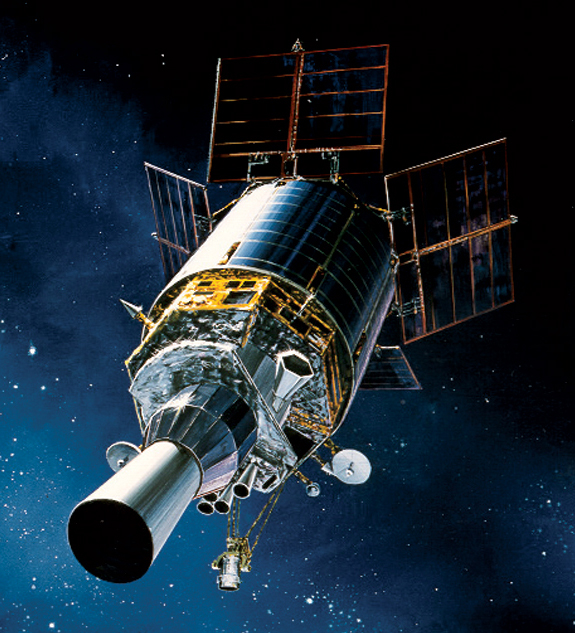
A Defense Support Program satellite in orbit

The Air Force operated strategic missile warning programs. The Space Systems Division managed two of these programs: the Missile Defense Alarm System (MIDAS) satellites, which used infrared sensors to detect missile or rocket launches, and Vela Hotel satellites, which detected atmospheric and outer space nuclear detonations to monitor compliance with the Partial Nuclear Test Ban Treaty. Both of these mission sets were predicted in the 1946 Project RAND report.

DARPA started Project Vela in response to international conferences and congressional hearings. A joint Defense Department-United States Atomic Energy Commission program, Project Vela consisted of three segments: Vela Uniform, which detected underground or surface detonations using seismic monitors, Vela Sierra, which used ground-based sensors to detect above-surface detonations, and Vela Hotel, which consisted of a constellation of space-based sensors for atmospheric and exoatmospheric nuclear detonations. DARPA assigned the Air Force Ballistic Missile Division responsibility for the spacecraft and boosters, while Atomic Energy Commission laboratories provided instrumentation and the Lawrence Radiation Laboratory provided the sensors. The first test launches were authorized on 22 June 1961 by DARPA, launching on Atlas-Agena boosters. On 16 October 1963, the first operational Vela Hotel satellites were launched, with a second pair following on 17 July 1964. In the 1970s, dedicated Vela Hotel satellites were phased out and were replaced with the Integrated Operational Nuclear Detonation Detection System (IONDS), which were placed on Defense Support Program and Navstar Global Positioning System satellites as secondary payloads.

Unlike Vela Hotel, MIDAS experienced a number of problems due to its complexities. In Fall 1960, General Laurence S. Kuter, commander-in-chief of North American Air Defense Command and Lieutenant General Joseph H. Atkinson, commander of Air Defense Command, urged chief of staff of the Air Force General Thomas D. White to accelerate and expand the troubled MIDAS program. This led to tension between the AFBMD, which sought to continue its research and development, while Air Defense Command wanted to operationally employ it as early as possible. The final MIDAS development plan put forward by AFBMD in March 1961 anticipated 27 development launches and initial operating capability in January 1964. On 16 January, the Joint Chiefs of Staff approved NORAD as the operational command with Air Defense Command as service command. Air Defense Command called for eight satellites in two orbital rings, ensuring constant coverage of the Soviet Union, with sensor data transmitted to the Ballistic Missile Early Warning System (BMEWS) radar sites, then relayed to the NORAD command post in the Cheyenne Mountain Complex. In summer 1961, director of defense research and development Harold Brown conducted a review of the MIDAS program, expressing concern that it could detect light ballistic missiles and submarine launched ballistic missiles. After several test flights, the MIDAS program was reduced to a research and development program, however progress was made in 1963 when MIDAS satellites successfully detected nine launches of LGM-30A Minuteman and UGM-27 Polaris solid-fuel missiles and SM-65 Atlas and HGM-25A Titan I liquid-fuel missiles. Due to defense budget cuts and technological obsolescence, the MIDAS program was ended in 1966 without becoming an operational system.

MIDAS was replaced by the Defense Support Program (DSP) in August 1966. DSP was originally intended to monitor the Soviet Strategic Missile Forces Fractional Orbital Bombardment System nuclear weapons system, however it was also developed as a replacement for the ground-based Ballistic Missile Early Warning System. In November 1970 the first DSP satellite was launched on a Titan IIIC. The primary ground station was at the Air Force Satellite Control Facility, with a secondary ground station constructed in April 1971 at RAAF Woomera Range Complex in Australia, with an additional ground station constructed at Buckley Air National Guard Base in Colorado. Operational control of the Defense Support Program was conducted by the North American Air Defense Command, with the newly christened Aerospace Defense Command conducting day to day operations.

=== Space defense operations ===
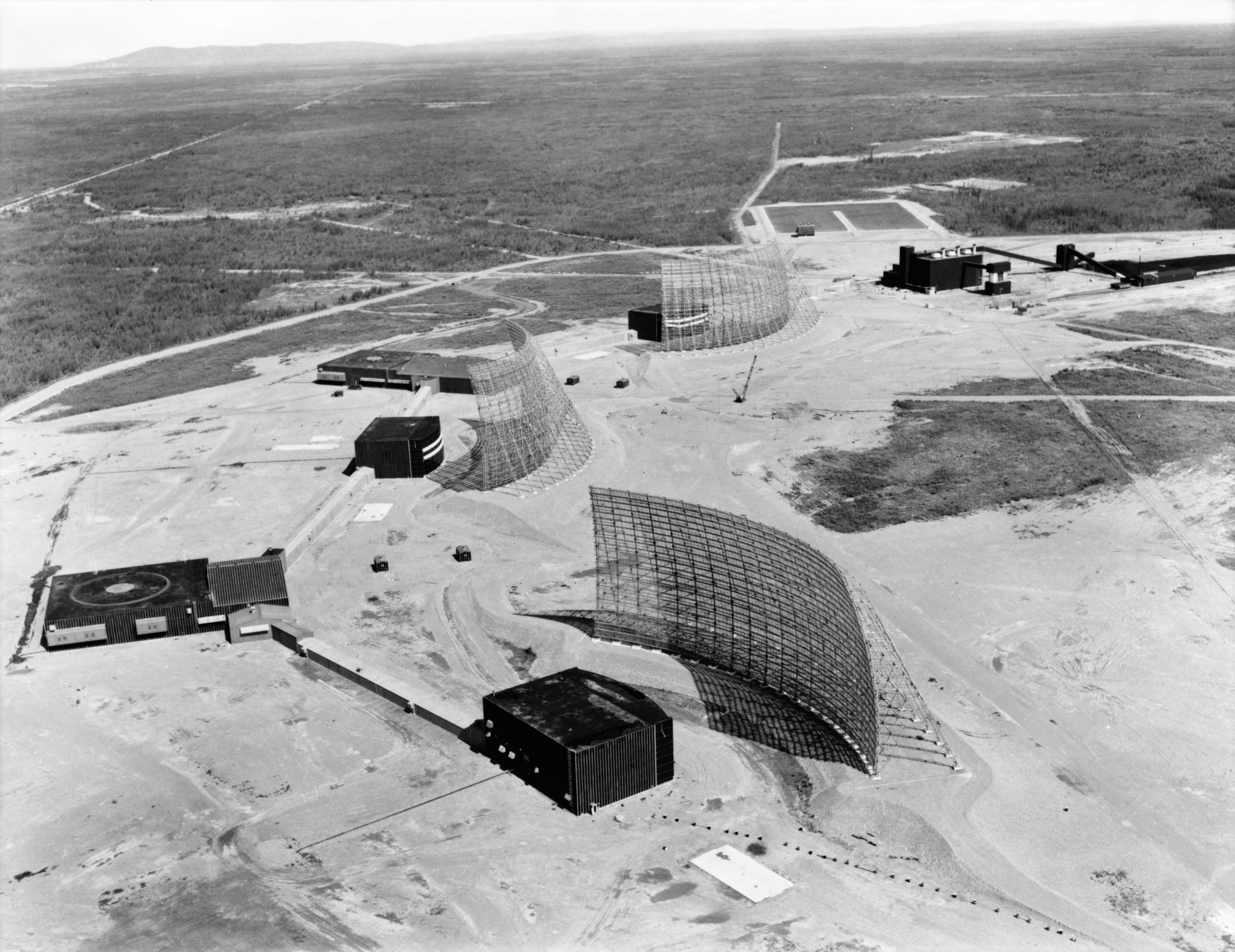
Ballistic Missile Early Warning System radars at Clear Air Force Station, Alaska

Shield of Air Defense Command, which was responsible for most operational space forces

Following the debate between the Air Force and Navy over operational control of the Space Detection and Tracking System (SPADATS), on 7 November 1960, the Joint Chiefs of Staff operational command of SPADATS to North American Air Defense Command (NORAD) and Continental Air Defense Command (CONAD). The Air Force component, Spacetrack, was operationally assigned to Air Defense Command. On 14 February 1961, the 1st Aerospace Surveillance and Control Squadron (assigned to the 9th Aerospace Defense Division on 1 October 1961 and renamed the 1st Aerospace Control Squadron on 1 July 1962) was activated to operate the SPADATS data collection and catalog center as part of NORAD's Space Defense Center at Ent Air Force Base, assuming the responsibilities of the Interim National Space Surveillance and Control Center. On 1 February 1961, NORAD assumed operational command of the Navy Space Surveillance System (NAVSPASUR) system and its data tracking facility at Naval Support Activity Dahlgren.

The 9th Aerospace Defense Division had responsibility for all Air Defense Command space forces, including the Missile Defense Alarm System, Ballistic Missile Early Warning System, Space Detection and Tracking System, NORAD Combat Operations Center, the Bomb Alarm System, and the Nuclear Detonation System.

Space surveillance operations were conducted by the 73rd Aerospace Surveillance Wing starting on 1 January 1967. Prior to the standup of the 73rd Aerospace Surveillance Wing, squadrons reported directly to the 9th Aerospace Defense Division. The initial Spacetrack sensors included the Millstone Hill Radar at the Massachusetts Institute of Technology and Baker-Nunn cameras at the Smithsonian Astrophysical Observatory, Edwards Air Force Base, Johnston Atoll, and Oslo, Norway. By 1965 the system would grow to include Air Defense Command's AN/FPS-17 and AN/FPS-80 radars operated by the 16th Surveillance Squadron at Shemya Air Force Base, AN/FPS-17 and AN/FPS-79 radars operated by the 19th Surveillance Squadron at Pirinçlik Air Base, the AN/FPS-49 Ballistic Missile Early Warning System (BMEWS) prototype operated by the 17th Surveillance Squadron at Moorestown, New Jersey, and the AN/FPS-50 BMEWS prototype at Trinidad Air Base. The FSR-2 electo-optical system at Cloudcroft Observatory, New Mexico and the AN/FPS-85 radar at operated by the 20th Space Surveillance Squadron at Eglin Air Force Base joined the United States Space Surveillance Network in 1967. In the 1970s, the Baker-Nunn network was replaced by the Ground-based Electro-Optical Deep Space Surveillance (GEODSS) network, with locations at Socorro, New Mexico, Diego Garcia, the Maui Space Surveillance Complex, and Morón Air Base. The Baker-Nunn network and GEODSS system was operated by the 18th Space Surveillance Squadron. Other space surveillance squadrons included the 2nd Surveillance Squadron (Sensor)

Air Defense Command's Ballistic Missile Early Warning System, operated by the 71st Surveillance Wing, also provided supplemental space surveillance. These included the radars operated by the 12th Missile Warning Squadron at Thule Air Base, 13th Missile Warning Squadron at Clear Air Force Station, and the Royal Air Force at RAF Fylingdales.

The 10th Aerospace Defense Group operated Weapon System 437, a nuclear anti-satellite Thor DSV-2 missile system.

In recognition of the importance of space defense, Air Defense Command was redesignated as Aerospace Defense Command on 15 January 1968 and the 9th Aerospace Defense Division was inactivated and replaced by the Fourteenth Aerospace Force on 1 July 1968.

=== Space launch fleet and ground support infrastructure ===
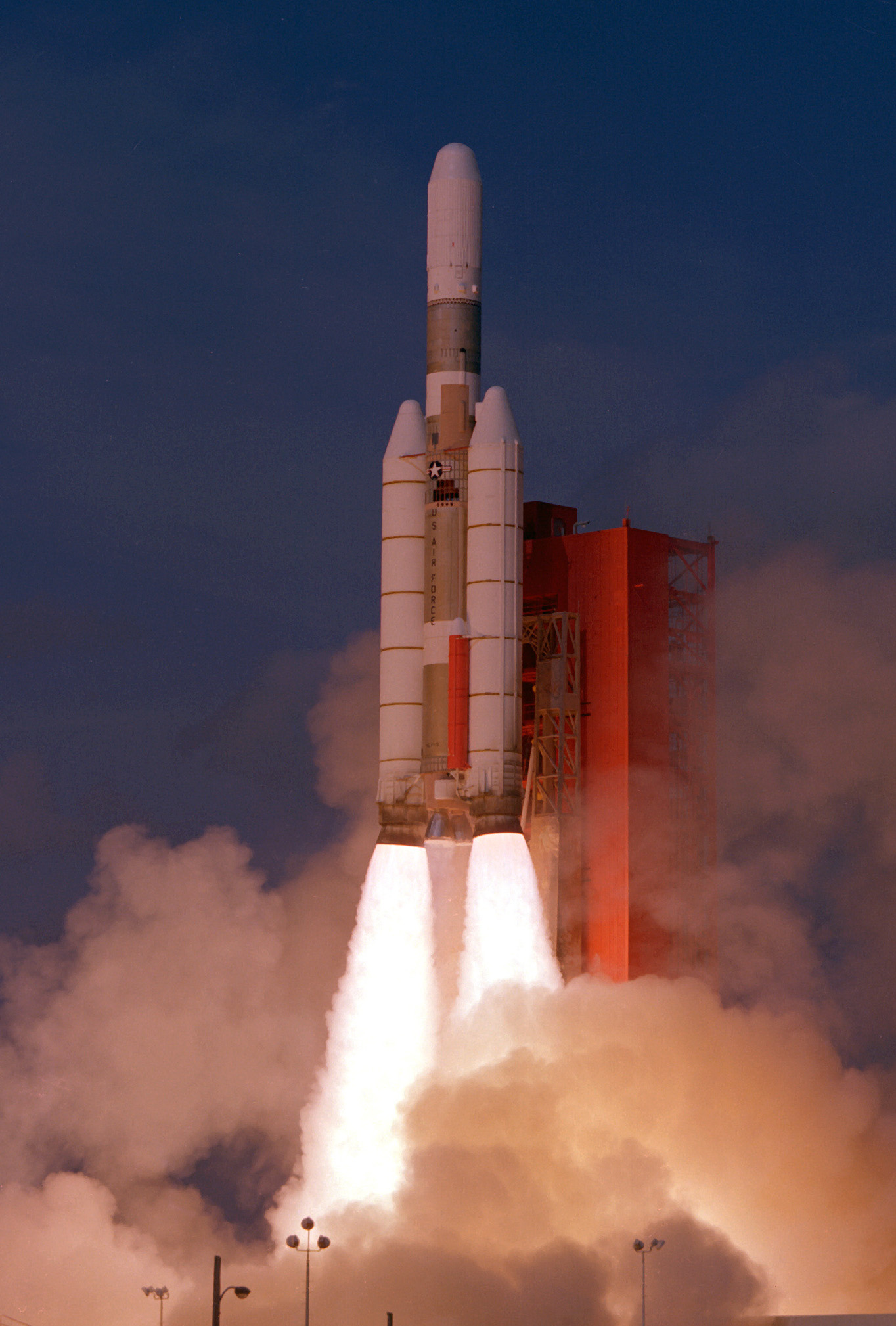
Launch of a Titan IIIC, sometimes referred to as the DC-3 of space because of how it increased ease of access to space

The Space Systems Division's monopoly in space launch vehicles was, in large part, the prime reason for its primacy in the space domain. Early ballistic missiles, such as the PGM-17 Thor and SM-65 Atlas (which included the SM-65A, SM-65B, and SM-65C prototypes and the SM-65D, SM-65E, and SM-65F operational missiles) did perform adequately compared to Soviet Strategic Missile Forces ICBMs, and were rapidly phased out in favor of the solid-fueled LGM-30 Minuteman and UGM-27 Polaris missiles. However, the Atlas and Thor missiles gained new life as the backbone of the Space Systems Division's launch fleet.

The Douglas Aircraft Company Thor space launch vehicle performed its first space launch in December 1959, primarily performing space launches from Vandenberg Air Force Base's Western Test Range. Specific variants of the Thor space launch vehicle included the Thor-Able, which included an Able second stage, Thor-Ablestar, and the Thor-Delta, which is considered the first member of the Delta space launch vehicle family, the Thor-Burner, Thor DSV-2U, Thorad-Agena.

The General Dynamics Astronautics Atlas space launch vehicle was more powerful than the Thor and primarily launched heavier payloads from Cape Canaveral Air Force Station's Eastern Test Range. The SM-65B Atlas, which was also a prototype for the operational missile, performed its first space launch. A number of space launch vehicles were based on the SM-65D Atlas, including the Atlas SLV-3, which had the RM-81 Agena and Centaur upper stages, the Atlas LV-3B, which launched the final four Project Mercury spaceflights, Atlas-Agena, Atlas-Able, and Atlas-Centaur. Decommissioned SM-65E Atlas and SM-65F Atlas missiles were converted to the Atlas E/F launch vehicle. Other launch vehicles derived from the original SM-65 missile included the Atlas G, Atlas H, Atlas I, Atlas II, Atlas III, and Atlas V.

While the Thor and Atlas were considered medium boosters, the Martin Titan IIIC was considered a heavy booster and was the first rocket with the power to launch payloads into geosynchronous orbit. Its first launch was on 18 June 1965. The Titan IIIC had two other variants, including the Titan IIIB, which was originally designed to support the Manned Orbiting Laboratory, and Titan IIID. The Titan IIIE was used by NASA for interplanetary missions and the Titan IIIA was an early rocket in the family. The success of the Titan IIIC prompted some to call it the "DC-3 of the Space Age"

The Space Systems Division's primary launch sites were Cape Canaveral Air Force Station (briefly known as Cape Kennedy Air Force Station) in Florida, which managed the Eastern Test Range, and Vandenberg Air Force Base in California, which managed the Western Test Range. Cape Canaveral was selected after the end of the Second World War to be the western end of the Long Range Proving Ground and the Air Force absorbed Banana River Naval Air Station, renaming it Patrick Air Force Base, to support the missile tests there. In the 1960s, Cape Canaveral Air Force Station underwent major expansion to support NASA crewed spaceflights. Vandenberg Air Force Base was formed from the Army's Camp Cooke and briefly known as Cooke Air Force Base. Management of the Eastern Range at Cape Canaveral was initially the responsibility of the Air Force Eastern Test Range while launches were performed by the 6555th Aerospace Test Wing. Vandenberg AFB was used for testing ICBMs and IRBMs, forming part of the Pacific Missile Range, and was selected for polar launches. In 1971, Vandenberg was selected to perform near-polar Space Shuttle launches. Management of the Western Range at Vandenberg was initially the responsibility of the Air Force Western Test Range while launches were performed by the 6595th Aerospace Test Wing.

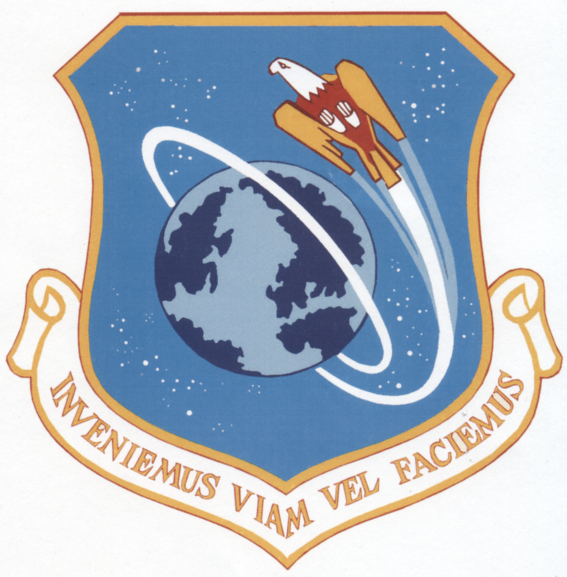
Shield of the Air Force Satellite Control Facility

The second effort, the Air Force Satellite Control Facility, consisted of a global system of tracking, telemetry, and control stations, with its central control facility located in California. The first Air Force Ballistic Missile Division tracking stations were set up in 1958 at the Kaena Point Satellite Tracking Station, in 1959 at Vandenberg Air Force Base and New Boston Air Force Station, in 1961, at Thule Air Base, Greenland, in 1963 at Mahé, Seychelles, and in 1965 at Andersen Air Force Base, Guam. The control center in California was first referred to as the Air Force Satellite Test Center and the 6594th Test Wing (later redesignated as the 6594th Aerospace Test Wing) operated the facility at Onizuka Air Force Station.

This enhanced focus on space resulted in a number of organizational changes, including the consolidation of the Eastern and Western Test Ranges under Air Force Systems Command's National Range Division in January 1964, the transfer of the Pacific Missile Range from the Navy to the Air Force and the Air Force's assumption of responsibility for the satellite tracking network in 1963. The National Range Division, headquartered at Patrick Air Force Base, established the Air Force Space Test Center at Vandenberg Air Force Base to manage all Pacific range activities. In January 1964, the National Range Division also gained responsibility for the Air Force Satellite Control Facility. This change was reversed in July 1965, with the Space Systems Division regaining responsibility for the Satellite Control Facility. The establishment of the Space and Missile Systems Organization in 1967 resulted in the formation of the Space and Missile Test Center on 1 April 1970 at Vandenberg Air Force Base, consolidating all Western Range activities under SAMSO. This consolidation was completed in 1977, when the Eastern Test Range was assigned to SAMSO.

=== Space forces in the Vietnam War ===
The first combat employment of space forces occurred during the Vietnam War. In particular, weather and communications satellite support was considered critical by ground and air commanders.

The Defense Meteorological Support Program, in particular, proved absolutely critical to the Seventh Air Force, which relied upon cloud-free environments to provide low-level fighter, tanker, and gunship operations. Starting in 1965, Strategic Air Command began providing DMSP information to Air Force planners, with NASA providing information from their Nimbus satellites. The Navy was unable to receive DMSP data until 1970, when the USS Constellation (CV-64) gained the proper readout equipment. Specific operations that were supported by space forces through DMSP support included the Navy's destruction of the Thanh Hóa Bridge in North Vietnam and Operation Ivory Coast by Army Special Forces and Air Commandos to rescue American prisoners of war in 1970.

Satellite communications support began in June 1966, with a terminal being activated at Tan Son Nhut Air Base using NASA's Synchronous Communications Satellite to communicate with Hawaii. Initial Defense Communication Satellite Program terminals were installed in Saigon and Nha Trang in July 1967, enabling the transmission of high-resolution photography between Saigon and Washington D.C., enabling intelligence analysts and national leadership to assess near-real-time battlefield intelligence. Commercial satellite communications support was also provided by COMSAT.

== Air Force Space Command (1982–2019) ==
=== Inactivation of Aerospace Defense Command ===
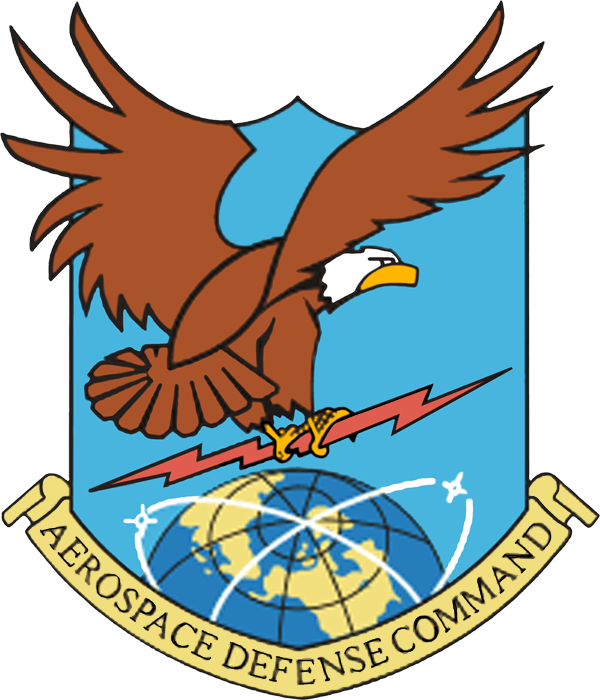
Shield of Aerospace Defense Command, which sought to be the central space command prior to its inactivation. When it was redesignated in 1967, it added orbits over the Earth to emphasize its space forces.

Shield of the North American Aerospace Defense Command, which was operationally responsible for space defense

Despite the rapid development in military space forces within the Air Force, there was no centralized command for them. Air Force Systems Command was responsible for research, development, and procurement, flying the Defense Satellite Communications System satellites for the Defense Communications Agency and other pre-operational constellations, as well as executing space launch and managing the Air Force Satellite Control Facility; Aerospace Defense Command (ADCOM) was responsible for space surveillance and missile defense for North American Air Defense Command; and Strategic Air Command was responsible for flying the Defense Meteorological Support Program. Following a change in nuclear posture, NORAD's primary mission shifted from active defense against a nuclear attack to surveillance and warning of an impending attack, resulting in Aerospace Defense Command a major reorganization. ADCOM's atmospheric interceptors were cut, replaced with space-based warning systems, increasing their profile within NORAD.

The development of the Space Shuttle began as a joint Defense Department-NASA program, with the Space and Missile Systems Organization serving as the Defense Department's executive agent on the program. The Space Shuttle promised a reusable spacecraft and an end to costly expendable launch vehicles, as well as a way to reinvigorate the Air Force's place within space. Military requirements were taken into account while designing the Space Shuttle orbiter, dictating the size of the payload bay. Ultimately, the Space Shuttle was intended to replace all but the smallest and largest expendable space launch vehicles. The Defense Department and NASA jointly chose Kennedy Space Center and Vandenberg Air Force Base's Space Launch Complex 6 as shuttle launch locations. To centralize U.S. military requirements for the shuttle the Defense Department Space Shuttle User Committee was established in November 1973 and chaired by the Air Staff's director of space.

The military application of the shuttle, and the increased space mission for Aerospace Defense Command prompted an internal competition among the Air Force's major commands for the space mission starting in 1974. Air Force Systems Command, through the Space and Missile Systems Organization, was the lead for space research, development, launch, and procurement. This resulted in SAMSO having development responsibilities for the Space Shuttle, however due to poorly defined lines separating experimental from operational space, SAMSO also had an operational space role. Aerospace Defense Command sought operational responsibility for the Space Shuttle due to its experience as the Air Force's primary operational space command and control of the United States Space Surveillance Network. Military Airlift Command and Strategic Air Command also attempted to claim operational responsibility for the shuttle. This debate over the shuttle, and later the Global Positioning System, prompted the Defense Department and Air Force to begin to reevaluate if space systems should be assigned to commands on an individual basis, as was current practice, or if they should be centralized in a single command.

Despite this fragmentation, operational space systems were being developed and deployed at an ever expansive rate. In February 1977, the Defense Communications System authorized the Space and Missile Systems Organization to begin development on the Defense Satellite Communications System Phase III (DSCS III), with an expected operational date of 1981 to 1984. The Navstar Global Positioning System (GPS) development also was accelerating, and by 1981 five test satellites were on-orbit and supporting Navy requirements. Aerospace Defense Command's Defense Support Program was providing constant surveillance of Soviet Strategic Missile Forces and Chinese People's Liberation Second Artillery Corps rocket launches. The Aerospace Defense Command's Space Detection and Tracking System (SPADATS) continued to expand, adding the AN/FPS-108 Cobra Dane radar at Shemya Air Force Base in 1977 and in 1982 incorporating the AN/FPS-115 PAVE PAWS radars operated by the 7th Missile Warning Squadron at Beale Air Force Base and the 6th Missile Warning Squadron at Cape Cod Air Force Station into SPADATS. In the early 1980s, the Ground-based Electro-Optical Deep Space Surveillance System began to fully replace the Baker-Nunn telescopes. The space surveillance system highlighted the divide between the space communities, with Aerospace Defense Command's Space Detection and Tracking System focused almost entirely on fulfilling NORAD requirements, while Air Force Systems Command's satellite infrastructure focused on research and development.

Renewed Soviet anti-satellite missile tests and co-orbital in 1976 by the Soviet Air Defense Forces and Strategic Missile Forces added to the heightened sense of urgency regarding space. The United States had no anti-satellite capability, having decommissioned Aerospace Defense Command's Program 437 in 1975, which had been put into standby status in 1970. In Fall 1976, Present Ford authorized development on what would become the McDonnell Douglas F-15 Eagle-launched ASM-135 ASAT and Aerospace Defense Command began a reevaluation of its space defense capabilities.

In 1977, the Air Staff released the Proposal for a Reorganization of USAF Air Defense and Space Surveillance/Warning Resources, known informally as the Green Book Study. It marked the beginning of the end for Aerospace Defense Command, calling for its inactivation and the transition of its air defense mission to Tactical Air Command, its communications assets (not satellite communications, which were operated by Air Force Systems Command) to Air Force Communications Command, and its space assets to Strategic Air Command. General James E. Hill attempted to fight its inactivation, highlight its bi-national nature and advocating for Aerospace Defense Command to become a Space Defense Command. United States Under Secretary of the Air Force Hans Mark also was concerned with inactivating Aerospace Defense Command, objecting to merging Aerospace Defense Command's defensive systems with the offensive systems of Strategic Air Command, which the Canadians were opposed to. Moreover, he expressed concern that space systems modernization would not receive sufficient attention with Strategic Air Command, whose primary focus was offensive nuclear bombers and missiles. Under Secretary Mark lobbied, ultimately unsuccessfully, to have Aerospace Defense Command become the primary space command within the Air Force. General Hill also argued to his fellow generals that the Air Force required a space operations command – and that Aerospace Defense Command fit that role perfectly. Ultimately, Air Force leadership did not seem to understand the importance of space, instead forming an Air Staff group to examine the feasibility of a future space command. The Space Mission Organization Planning Executive Committee was appointed by Air Force chief of staff General Lew Allen in November 1978 to examine all aspects of the space mission. Among the analysts was then Lieutenant Colonel Thomas S. Moorman Jr., future commander of Air Force Space Command and vice chairman of the Joint Chiefs of Staff. The study proposed a central space command, however General Allen did not favor centralization. On 31 March 1980, Aerospace Defense Command was inactivated as an Air Force major command (although left existent as a specified combatant command until 16 December 1986). In 1980, its space activates were transferred to Strategic Air Command.

=== Establishment of Air Force Space Command ===
Shield of Strategic Air Command, which was briefly responsible for space forces following the inactivation of Aerospace Defense Command

On 1 October 1979, the Space and Missiles Systems Organization was split, establishing the Space Division and Ballistic Missile Office. This change was in part due to the strain put on SAMSO for developing the Space Shuttle and the LGM-118 Peacekeeper concurrently. The reorganization also resulted in the subordination of the Eastern Range and Patrick Air Force Base to the Eastern Space and Missile Center and the Western Range and Vandenberg Air Force Base to the Western Space and Missile Center, both of which were subordinated under the Space and Missile Test Organization. Air Force Systems Command also established a deputy commander for space operations, who was made responsible for all non-acquisitions space functions, including liaising with NASA and the integration and operational support of military shuttle payloads. In preparation for classified shuttle operations, Air Force Systems Command activated the Manned Spaceflight Support Group at Johnson Space Center. Ultimately, the Manned Spaceflight Support Group was intended to transition into the Air Force's own Shuttle Operations and Planning Complex at the Consolidated Space Operations Center. The Air Force Satellite Control Facility was transitioned from the Space Division to report directly to the Systems Command deputy commander for space operations. In 1979, Air Force doctrine recognized space as a mission area for the first time, and in 1981 the Air Staff Directorate for Space Operations was created within the Deputy Chief of Staff for Operations, Plans, and Readiness.

In 1981, Representative Ken Kramer introduced a resolution in the House of Representatives that would have renamed the Department of the Air Force and the United States Air Force into the Department of the Aerospace Force and United States Aerospace Force, respectively. This proposal made Air Force leadership extremely uncomfortable, arguing that the Air Force's legislative mandate be to "be trained and equipped for prompt and sustained offensive and defensive operations in air and space, including coordination with ground and naval forces and the preservation of free access to space for U.S. spacecraft." It also called upon the Air Force to create a space command. Under the pressure and with the possibility that President Reagan might propose an independent space force be created, the Air Force relented, committing to the establishment of a major command for space, briefly considering a organizational relationship where the commander of the Space Division would also be duel-hatted as the Aerospace Defense Command deputy commander for space.

On 1 September 1982, Space Command was established at Peterson Air Force Base, with General James V. Hartinger triple hatted at the commander of Space Command, NORAD, and Aerospace Defense Command. The commander of Air Force Systems Command's Space Division would serve as Space Command's vice commander. At the same time, the Space Technology Center was established at Kirtland Air Force Base to consolidate the three Air Force Systems Command laboratories working on space-related research on geophysics, rocket propulsion, and weapons. It was the intent of the Air Force that Space Command would grow to become a unified combatant command, which was necessary to gain the support of the United States Navy.

Shield of Air Force Space Command, which commanded all Air Force space forces and was the direct predecessor of the U.S. Space Force

The creation of Space Command on 1 September 1982 marked the beginning of the centralization of space into a single organization, which would culminate under its direct successor, the United States Space Force. In late 1982 and early 1983, Strategic Air Command began to transfer its 50 space activities to Space Command, including Space Command's headquarters at Peterson Air Force Base, Thule Air Base and Sondrestrom Air Base in Greenland, Clear Air Force Station, the Defense Meteorological Support Program, Defense Support Program, as well as the Military Strategic and Tactical Relay (Milstar) and the Global Positioning System, which were in development and acquisitions phase.

Milstar was intended to provide communication for the National Command Authority, and to ultimately replace the Navy's Fleet Satellite Communications System and Air Force Satellite Communications. The first Defense Satellite Communications System Phase III began to launch in 1982, beginning their replacement of the Defense Satellite Communications System Phase II. The Navstar Global Positioning System was nearing the end of its prototyping and validation phase when turned over to Space Command in 1984, with 7 Block I satellites on orbit. While Strategic Air Command willingly turned over its space systems, it attempted to maintain a voice in their administration, ultimately failing. Air Force Systems Command also attempted to maintain much of its space role through the Space Division, despite being a research and development command. It took until 1987 for Air Force Systems Command to transition the Air Force Satellite Control Network to Air Force Space Command (renamed from Space Command on 15 September 1985 to distinguish itself from United States Space Command) and the Consolidated Space Operations Center only became operational in March 1989.

On 23 September 1985, United States Space Command (USSPACECOM) was established as a functional unified combatant command for military space operations. From a bureaucratic perspective, the creation of U.S. Space Command was perquisite in gaining Army and Navy support for Air Force Space Command. The creation of U.S. Space Command also received significant support from President Reagan, who was pursuing the Strategic Defense Initiative ballistic missile defense system, which was dependent on space-based sensors and interceptors. The primary service component of U.S. Space Command was Air Force Space Command (AFSPC or AFSPACECOM), while the Navy established Naval Space Command (NAVSPACECOM) shortly after on 1 October 1983. The Army's component was smaller, first consisting of the Army Space Planning Group from 1985 to 1986, before being upgraded to the Army Space Agency in 1986, and finally establishing Army Space Command in 1988. At the activation ceremony was retired chief of naval operations Admiral Arleigh Burke, who had unsuccessfully lobbied for a unified space command twenty-five years prior. The commander of U.S. Space Command was triple-hatted as the commander of Air Force Space Command and of the bi-national North American Aerospace Defense Command. USSPACECOM assumed from NORAD the missile warning and space surveillance missions, as well as Cheyenne Mountain Air Force Station's Missile Warning Center and Space Defense Operations Center.

The Space Shuttle Challenger disaster caused significant concern within Air Force Space Command, as the Space Shuttle, which Air Force Space Command was operationally responsible for during military launch missions, was intended to be its primary space launch vehicle. Programs such as the Navstar Global Positioning System and Defense Support Program improvements suffered significant setbacks, and Air Force Systems Command's Space Division's expendable boosters were the only means of accessing space. Titan 34D, Titan IV, and Delta II space launch vehicles became the workhouse of the Space Division's launch fleet. In 1987, General John L. Piotrowski, SPACECOM commander, began to argue that the space launch mission needed to be transferred from the Space Division to Air Force Space Command, enabling U.S. Space Command to directly request launch operations during wartime. In December 1988, the Air Force announced that it would intend to consolidate space launch operations from Air Force Systems Command to Air Force Space Command. On 1 October 1990, Air Force Systems Command transferred Cape Canaveral Air Force Station, Patrick Air Force Base, Vandenberg Air Force Base, the Western Range and Eastern Range, and the Delta II and Atlas E/F launch missions. The remaining Atlas II, Titan 23G, and Titan IV missions were transferred over the following months. The Space Division also reassumed its former name of the Space Systems Division.

=== Space forces in the Gulf War ===
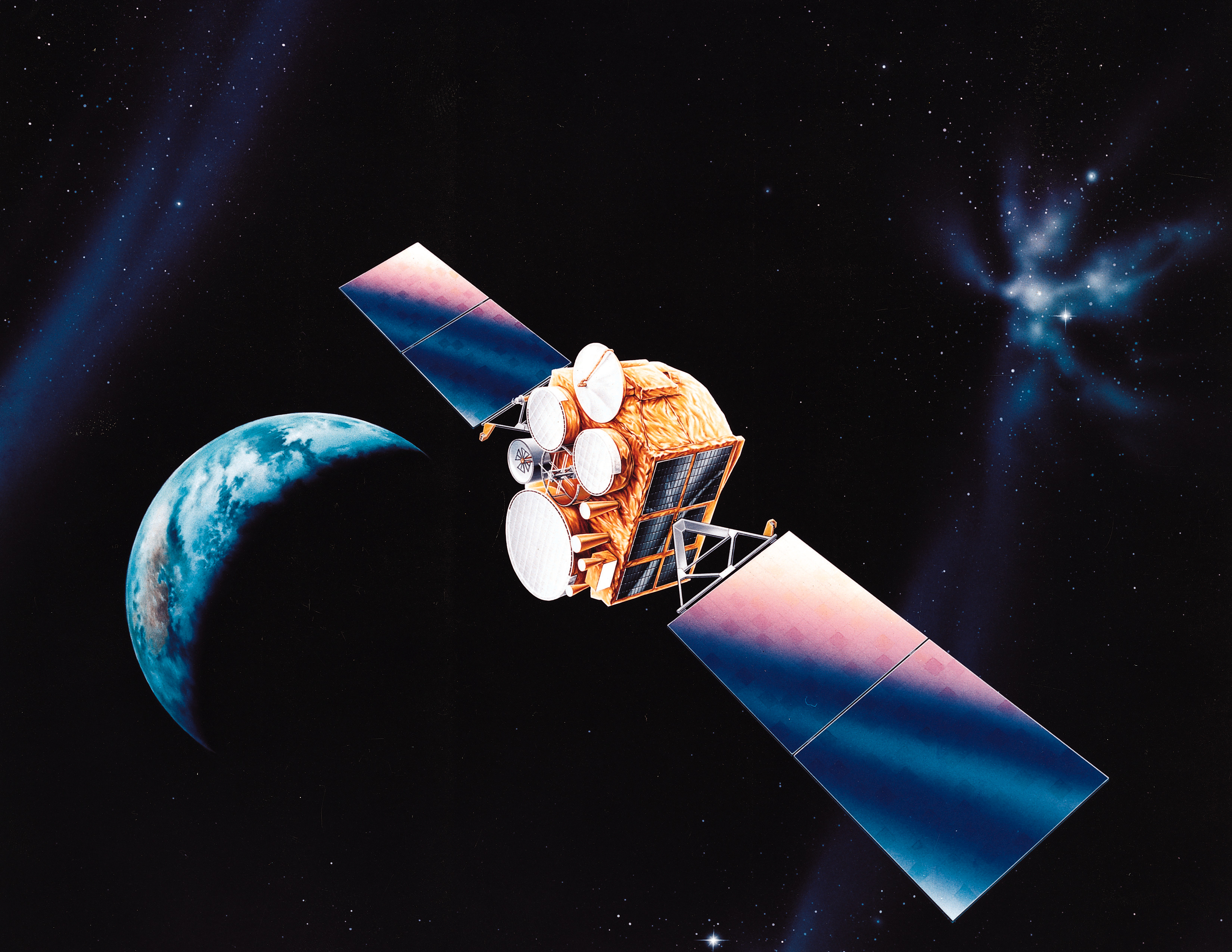
A Defense Satellite Communications System Phase III satellite on orbit

Although the Vietnam War was the first war which space forces supported, the Gulf War has sometimes been referred to as the first space war because of the crucial role that space forces played in supporting land, air, and maritime forces. Prior to the Gulf War, most space forces were focused on strategic nuclear deterrence, not on support to tactical forces. Space forces, specifically satellite communications forces, had been providing support to tactical forces during the 1982 Falklands War, the 1983 United States invasion of Grenada, and provided real time mission planning data to strike aircraft in the 1986 United States bombing of Libya. The first use of the "Navstar" Global Positioning System occurred in the Operation Earnest Will in 1988. During the United States invasion of Panama, Air Force Space Command provided communications through the Defense Satellite Communications System and weather support through the Defense Meteorological Satellite Program. In contrast, the Gulf War utilized the full range of U.S. space forces, with over sixty satellites providing 90% of theater communications and command and control for an army of 500,000 troops, weather support for mission planners, early warning of Iraqi Scud missile launches, and navigation support to terrestrial forces.

When the Iraqi Armed Forces invaded Kuwait in early August 1990, military communications satellites only provided support for an American administrative unit in Bahrain and two training groups in Saudi Arabia. No weather, navigation, early warning, or remote sensing support was typically provided to United States Central Command, requiring time for space forces to be assigned to the region. Iraq possessed no space forces of its own, contracting satellite communications with Intelsat, Inmarsat, and Arabsat, however its military leadership made no effort to integrate space into its military planning.

During the war, satellite communications was a crucial capacity, as much of the desert did not have reliable telecommunications coverage. Satellite communications carried over 90% of all communications for the military campaign, with commercial satellites accounting for 24% of the traffic. Air Force Space Command's Defense Satellite Communications System, Naval Space Command's Fleet Satellite Communications System, the NATO III communication satellites, and the Royal Air Force's Skynet all provided satellite communications. In August 1990, the DCSC network consisted of two DCSC II satellites and three DCSC III satellites, with one DSCS III in reserve and two DSCS II satellites for limited operational use. However, there were concerns if the DSCS network could provide the requisite capacity and concerns that satellite communications would be jammed by Iraqi forces, resulting in the reallocation of spacecraft by the 3rd Satellite Control Squadron, which flew the constellation.

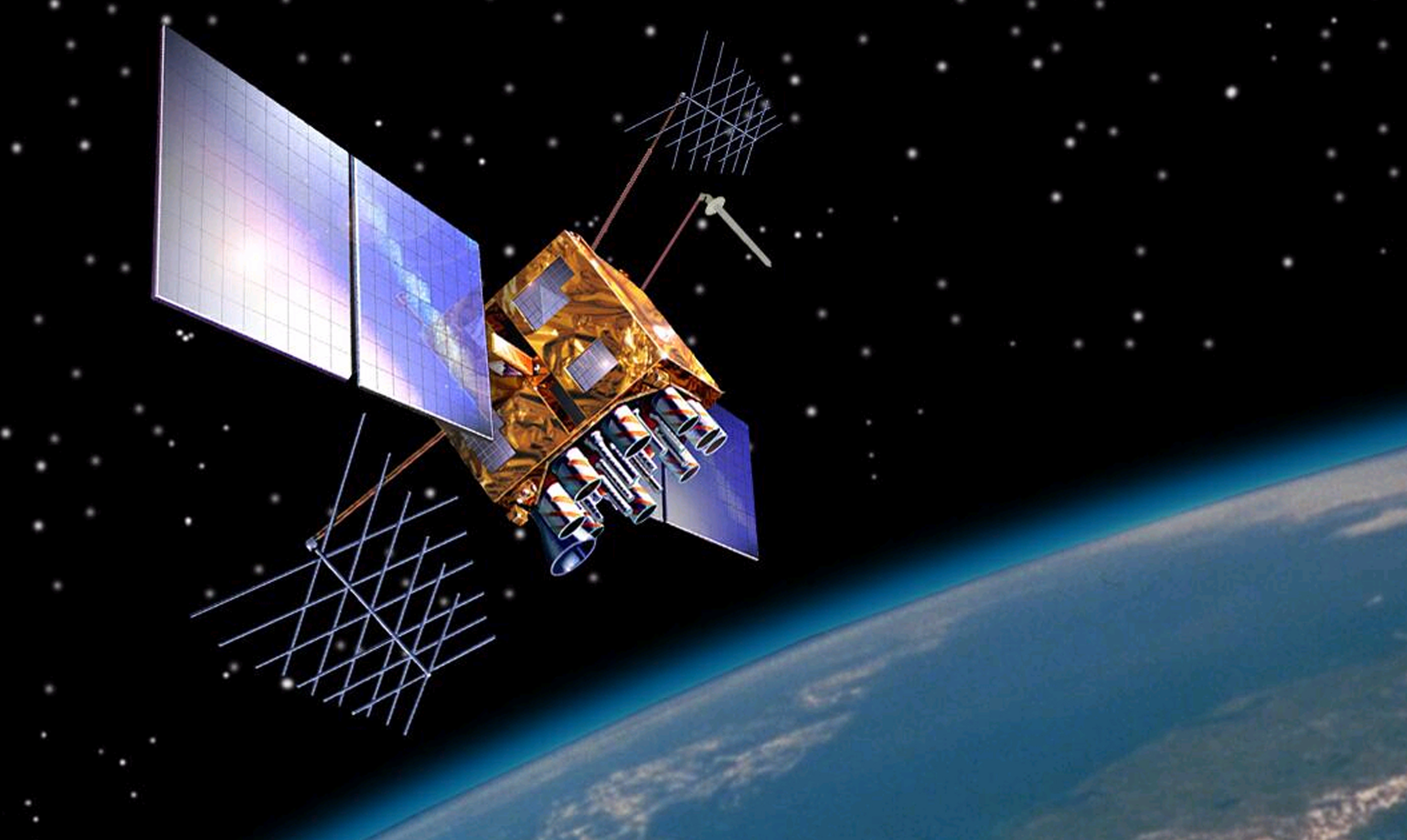
A Global Positioning System Block II satellite on orbit

The Navstar Global Positioning System was the most widely known space system used during the war. The first five operational Block I spacecraft were launched on a Delta II rocket in 1989, joining the prototypes in orbit. The Gulf War accelerated the program, and by 22 August 1990, the constellation consisted of fourteen satellites (six Block I prototypes and eight Block II operational satellites). Launches of two Block II satellites on 2 October and 26 November increased the constellation to 16 satellites right before the commencement of Operation Desert Storm. Army Space Command had purchased 500 demonstration GPS trackers, providing them to fielded forces in August. The Army soon realized the critical navigation capability they provided to its ground forces, and put in an emergency requisition for 1,000 GPS receivers and 300 vehicle installation kits. Later, in December, they requested 7,178 GPS receivers.

Coalition commanders also understood the importance of weather and earth monitoring satellite data in the Gulf region. Weather support was provided by Air Force Space Command's three Defense Meteorological Satellite Program (DMSP) spacecraft, National Oceanic and Atmospheric Administration's two Television Infrared Observation Satellite and Geostationary Operational Environmental Satellites. Coalition forces also received weather data from the Japan Meteorological Agency's Himawari satellites, the European Organisation for the Exploitation of Meteorological Satellites' two Meteosats, and Soviet Union's twelve Meteor satellites. Air Force Space Command's DMSP was considered to be the most useful of the coalition space weather systems, with DMSP terminals provided to Army ground forces and installed on Navy carriers and flagships. Earth imaging data was provided by the United States Geological Survey's Landsat 4 and Landsat 5 spacecraft, as well as the French CNES SPOT satellites. Coalition leadership were concerned that Iraq would attempt to gain imaging data, and convinced Landsat and SPOT to not make any available for purchases to Iraq. The Air Force used Landsat data in the construction of airfields, however, both the Air Force and the Marine Corps preferred to use SPOT in mission planning and rehearsal.

Space-based early warning provided by Air Force Space Command's Defense Support Program (DSP) proved critical in detecting Iraqi Scud missile launches. In August 1990, the DSP constellation consisted of three operational satellites and two spares.

After Iraq ignored President Bush's ultimatum to withdraw from Kuwait, the U.S.-led offensive, Operation Desert Storm, began. The Defense Satellite Communications System performed over 700,000 transactions per day and enabled immediate Air tasking order updates. Over 1,500 satellite communications terminals were assigned in theater. DCSC itself provided over 50% of all satellite communications requirements, providing air tasking updates to every air base and carrier. The Navstar Global Positioning System enabled the Army's Left Hook across the Iraqi desert and positioning data provided accuracy to special forces, artillery, and strike aircraft that had never before been achieved. GPS specifically enabled the Boeing B-52 Stratofortress to perform all weather raids, provided precise coordinates for cruise missile strikes in Baghdad, and enabled Army Apache helicopters to create major gaps in the Iraqi air defense networks. DMSP data provided accurate weather reports that enabled the use of precision laser-guided munitions, tracked rain and sandstorms, and provided updates on oil fires, oil spills, and the possible spread of chemical agents. Defense Support Program satellites provided early warning to Army Air Defense Artillery MIM-104 Patriot missiles.

=== The Space Commission ===
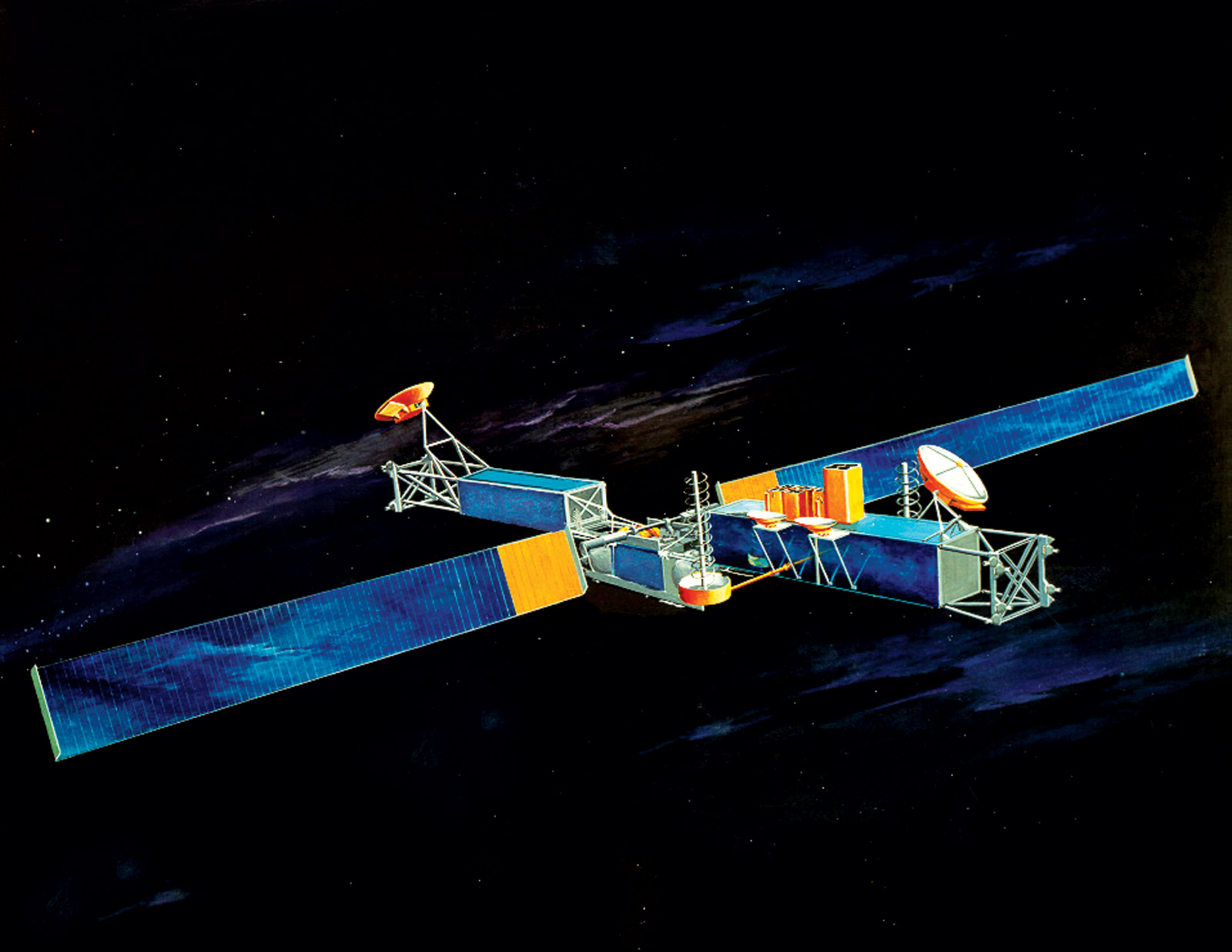
A Milstar satellite on orbit

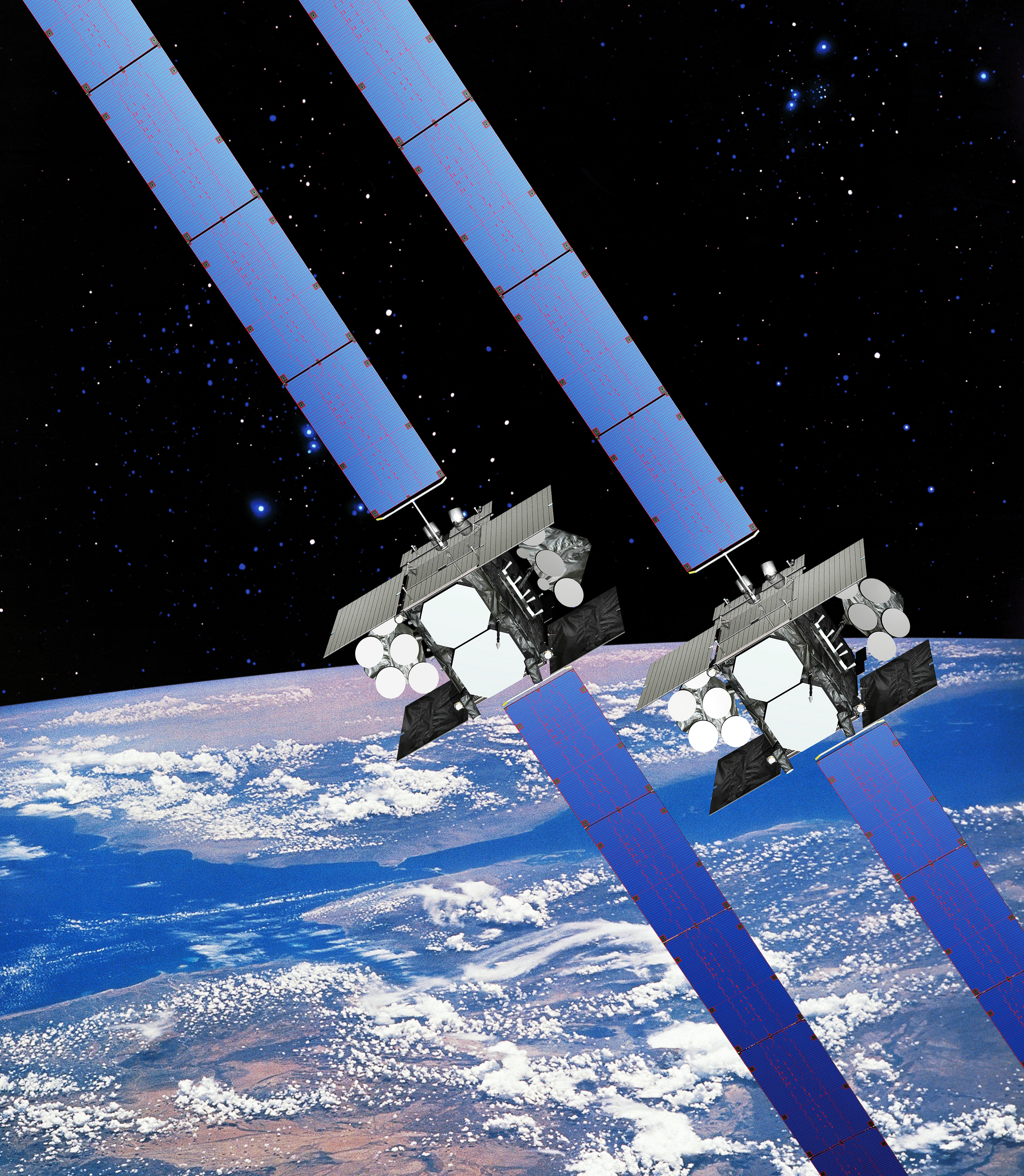
Wideband Global SATCOM satellites on orbit

The lessons learned during the Gulf War resulted in a renaissance for space forces, which saw their profile rise. Not burdened by being part of separate air commands, Air Force Space Command began to categorize its missions as space control, force application, force enhancement, and space support. Space control operations were intended to maintain the ability to use space, while denying an adversary the ability to do the same, to include the development of anti-satellite weapons like the ASM-135 ASAT. Force application was defined as fire support operations from space, such as ballistic missile defense and power projection operations against terrestrial targets. Elements from the Strategic Defense Initiative, such as Brilliant Pebbles and Brilliant Eyes promised a more aggressive military role for space. Space programs and systems continued to develop, including the completion of the 24-satellite Navstar Global Positioning System constellation in 1993, the development of the Space-Based Infrared System to replace the Defense Support Program, and the first launches of Milstar.

In 1992, Air Force Systems Command was merged with Air Force Logistics Command, becoming Air Force Materiel Command, resulting in the Space Systems Division becoming the Space and Missile Systems Center. With the completion of the GPS constellation, space acquisition priorities shifted to replacing aging spacecraft. In 1994, SMC began the development of the Space-Based Infrared System (SIBRS), a missile warning constellation that would succeed the Defense Support Program (DSP). Milstar also had a replacement system under works, with the Advanced Extremely High Frequency (AEHF) satellite communications constellation contracted in 1999. A year later, SMC issued a contract for the Wideband Global SATCOM (WGS) to replace the Defense Satellite Communications System (DSCS). The Space and Missile Systems Center began development of a new generation of launch vehicles, with the Atlas III procured in 1999. The Evolved Expendable Launch Vehicle program was contracted in 1995, resulting in the Delta IV and Atlas V space launch vehicles.

Despite the rising prominence of space forces during the Gulf War, a number of prominent generals within the Air Force sought to merge air and space operations into a seamless aerospace continuum. This attracted the ire of Congress, who saw the Air Force attempting to subordinate space to its aviation component, establishing the commission to Assess United States National Security Space Management and Organization to investigate. Senator Bob Smith, in particular took issue with the Air Force's management of space and began to propose an independent space force.

Chaired by former secretary of defense Donald Rumsfeld, the 2001 Space Commission recommended that the commander of United States Space Command should cease to be exclusively granted to military pilots and that the entire armed forces needs to cease with the practice of assigning terrestrial combat leaders with little space experience to top space posts. In particular, it noted that of 150 service personnel in space leadership, fewer than 20% had a space background, with the majority of the officers drawn from the pilot, air defense artillery, or nuclear and missile operations careers, and that the average had only spent2.5 years of their careers in space positions. The commission also came to the conclusion that the Air Force was not appropriately developing an independent space culture or education program and was not paying sufficient budgetary attention to space. The commission stated that: "“Few witnesses before the commission expressed confidence that the current Air Force organization is suited to the conduct of these [space] missions...Nor was there confidence that the Air Force will fully address the requirement to provide space capabilities for the other services. Many believe the Air Force treats space solely as a supporting capability that enhances the primary mission of the Air Force to conduct offensive and defensive air operations. Despite official doctrine that calls for the integration of space and air capabilities, the Air Force does not treat the two equally. As with air operations, the Air Force must take steps to create a culture within the service dedicated to developing new space system concepts, doctrine, and operational capabilities." Ultimately, the Space Commission recommended the creation of a separate Space Force as a military branch in the long term, with the establishment of a Space Corps, analogous to the Army Air Forces within the Air Force in the period between 2007 and 2011.

=== Space forces in the War on Terror ===
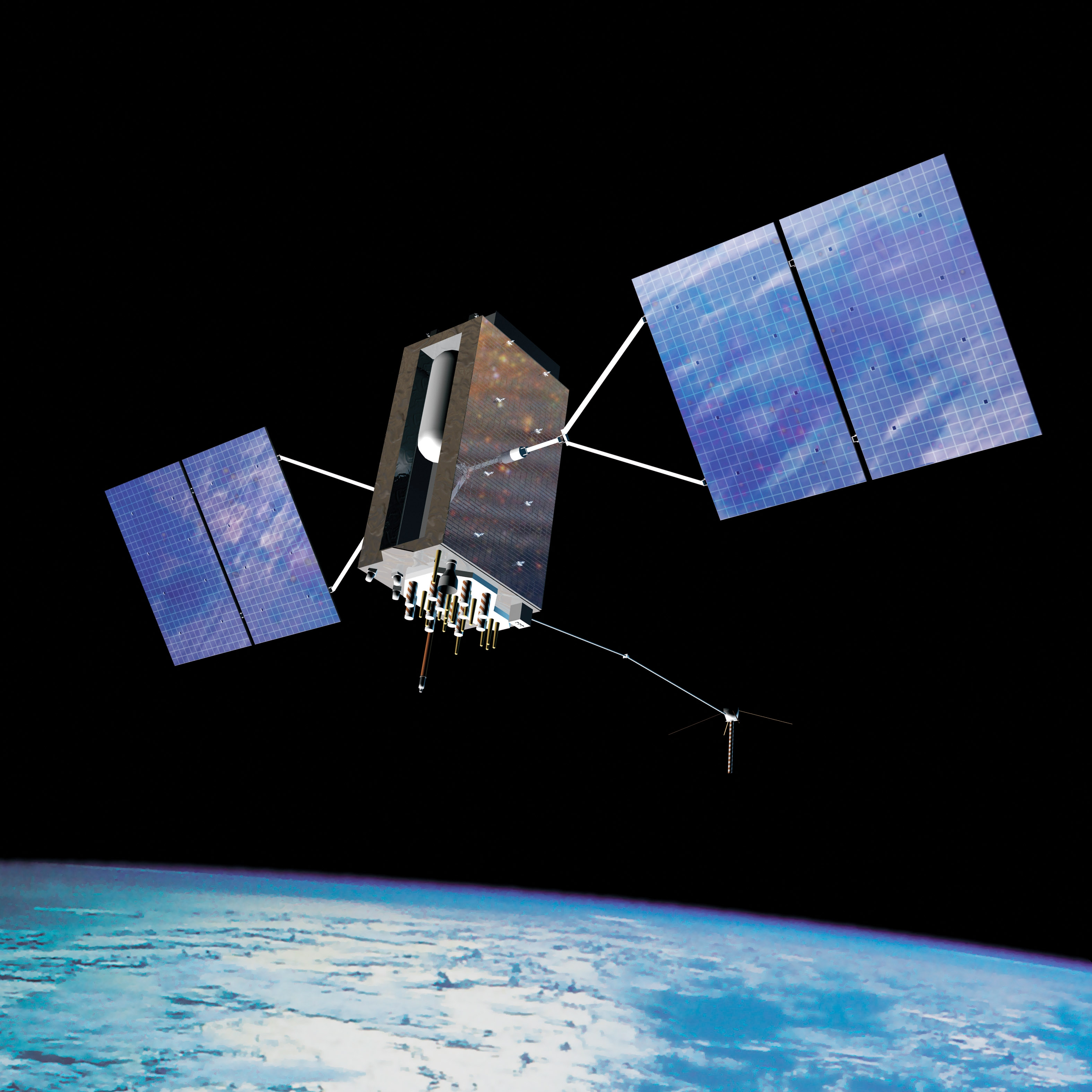
A Global Positioning System Block III satellite on orbit

The promise of a separate Space Corps or Space Force in the 2010s was cut short by the September 11 attacks. The immediate threat of Al-Qaeda left much less time and attention for emerging military powers like the People's Republic of China. During the War in Afghanistan (2001-2021) Air Force Space Command provided satellite communications, navigation through GPS enhancements, and deployed its own personnel. For Operation Iraqi Freedom, the Air Force Space Command deployed space operators to forward operating bases in the Middle East and the Defense Satellite Communications System Phase III provided 80% of bandwidth for allied forces in theater, while 85% of Milstar communications capacity was directed towards support of tactical forces.

After the September 11 terrorist attacks the 2001 Space Commission report was largely forgotten within the Air Force. None of the White House-level recommendations of having the president declare military space as a top national priority, creating a presidential advisory group for national security space, or appoint an interagency group for space occurred. Within the Department of Defense the recommendations of creating an under secretary of defense for space, intelligence, and information or putting space programs in a distinct funding category went unheeded. United States Space Command was folded into United States Strategic Command which was responsible for nuclear warfare and deterrence, further diluting military space leadership. Within U.S. Strategic Command, space responsibilities were absorbed into the Joint Functional Component Command for Space and Global Strike, in 2006 replaced by the Joint Functional Component Command for Space, and in 2017, be reorganized as the Joint Force Space Component Commander.

Some specific recommendations did get implemented, however, with the Air Force acting on the recommendation that space operations and acquisitions should be centralized under one major command, transitioning the Space and Missile Systems Center from Air Force Materiel Command to Air Force Space Command on 1 October 2001. During the waning days of Air Force Space Command, it was organized into the Fourteenth Air Force, which consisted of the 21st Space Wing for space control and missile warning, 50th Space Wing for space operations, 460th Space Wing for overhead persistent infrared operations, and the 30th Space Wing and the 45th Space Wing for space launch and range support, while the Space and Missile Systems Center served as its acquisitions arm.

Following the inactivation of U.S. Space Command in 2002, Russia and China began developing sophisticated on-orbit capabilities and an array of counter-space weapons. In particular, China conducted the 2007 Chinese anti-satellite missile test, destroying its Fengyun spacecraft, which, according to NASA, created 2,841 high-velocity debris items, a larger amount of dangerous space debris than any other space event in history. On 29 August 2019, United States Space Command was reestablished as a geographic combatant command.

== Path to an independent Space Force (2019–present) ==
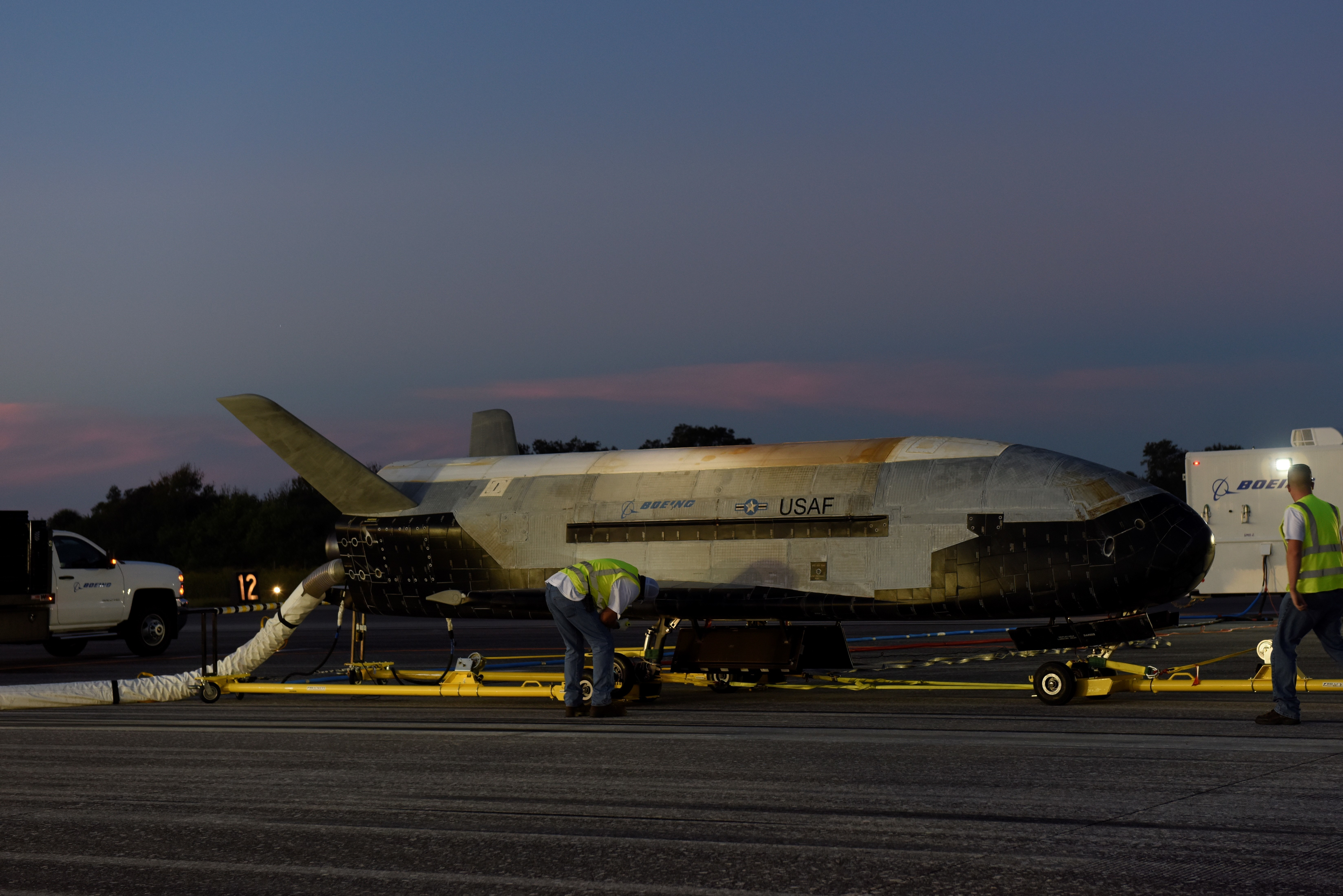
The Space Force's Boeing X-37B spaceplane after landing

The first real attempt to centralize the military space organizations occurred in 1958, with the Advanced Research Projects Agency sometimes being described as, and feared by its detractors that it would become, a fourth military service. While the 1981 proposal to rename the United States Air Force into the United States Aerospace Force was not an attempt to create a space service branch, it did mark a clear attempt by Congress to increase the profile of space within the service, which it rejected. The possibility that President Reagan would announce the creation of the Space Force as an independent service in 1982 spurred the Air Force to establish Air Force Space Command. The 1990s saw a number of proposals for an independent space force, including one by Air Force Space Command Lieutenant Colonel Cynthia A.S. McKinley in 2000 which called for the establishment of a United States Space Guard. The most notable proposal for an independent Space Force was by the 2001 Space Commission, which called for the creation of a Space Corps within the Air Force between 2007 and 2011, and the establishment of an independent Space Force after that. The Space Commission was established by Congress after it became concerned that the Air Force was seeking to artificially merge its air and space operations into a seamless aerospace continuum, without regard for the differences between space and air. Ultimately, due to the September 11 attacks, a Space Force was not established. The United States' national security space organization actually regressed, with United States Space Command being inactivated in 2002, subsumed into United States Strategic Command. The Allard Commission report, unveiled in the wake of the 2007 Chinese anti-satellite missile test, called for a reorganization of national security space, however many of its recommendations were not acted upon by the Air Force.

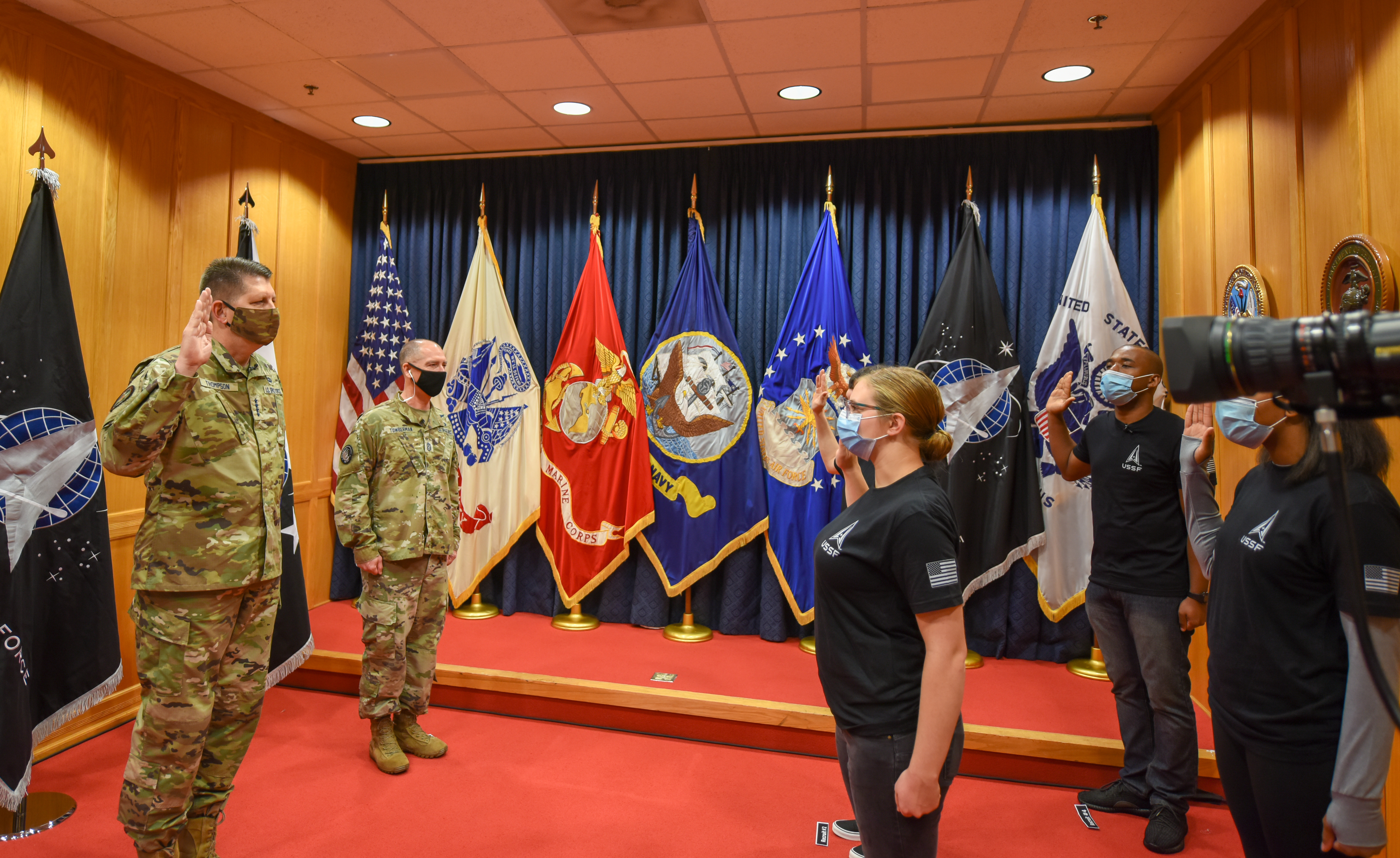
Vice chief of space operations General David D. Thompson swears in the first four enlisted Space Force recruits at the Baltimore Military Entrance Processing Station, Maryland on 20 October 2020.

Growing impatient with the Air Force, who they felt was more interested in jet fighters than space, Representatives Jim Cooper (D-TN) and Mike Rogers (R-AL) unveiled a bipartisan proposal in the House of Representatives to establish the United States Space Corps as a separate military service within the Department of the Air Force, with the commandant of the Space Corps as a member of the Joint Chiefs of Staff. This proposal was put forward to separate space professionals from the Air Force, give space a greater cultural focus, and help develop a leaner and faster space acquisitions system. This was done due to congressional concern that the space mission had become subordinate to the Air Force's preferred air dominance mission and that space officers were being treated unfairly within the Air Force, with Representative Rogers noting that in 2016 none of the 37 Air Force colonels selected for promotion to brigadier general were space officers and that only 2 of the 450 hours of Air Force professional military education were dedicated to space. The proposal passed in the House of Representatives, but was cut from the final bill in negotiations with the U.S. Senate. Following the defeat of the proposal in the Senate, both Representatives Cooper and Rogers heavily criticized Air Force leadership for not taking threats in space seriously and continued resistance to reform. The Space Corps proposal was, in large part, spurred on by the development of the People's Liberation Army Strategic Support Force and the Russian Space Forces. The House's Space Corps proposal had also been objected to by the Trump administration's White House, which called the idea "premature", while other dissenters were Defense Secretary James Mattis, Air Force Secretary Heather Wilson and Air Force Chief of Staff General David Goldfein.

In March 2018, President Donald Trump said that the creation of a Space Force was a "great idea" and "could happen". In June 2018, Trump said that he had asked the Department of Defense to begin establishing a Space Force as part of the military. In February 2019, the Department of Defense gave Congress a legislative proposal for creating the Space Force. This proposal called for the placement of the U.S. Space Force within the Department of the Air Force, before later creating and transferring the service to the Department of the Space Force. The Space Force proposal was supported by NASA Administrator Jim Bridenstine, who has stated that a space force is critical to defending the United States' energy grid and GPS network and Secretary of the Air Force Barbara Barrett. has also endorsed a space force. Other supporters include Air Force General and commander of both United States Space Command and Air Force Space Command John W. Raymond, Navy Admiral and NATO Supreme Allied Commander James Stavridis, Air Force Colonel and astronaut Buzz Aldrin, Air Force Colonel and astronaut Terry Virts, Marine Corps Colonel and astronaut Jack R. Lousma, astronaut David Wolf, astronaut Clayton Anderson, CNN Chief National Security Correspondent Jim Sciutto, and SpaceX CEO Elon Musk.

In May 2019, a group of 43 former military, space, and intelligence leaders released an open letter calling for a space force. Signatories include former Secretary of Defense William Perry, former Directors of National Intelligence Admiral Dennis C. Blair and Vice Admiral John Michael McConnell, former Chairman of the House Science Committee Congressman Robert Smith Walker, former Deputy Secretary of Defense Robert O. Work, former Secretary of the Air Force and Director of the National Reconnaissance Office Edward C. Aldridge Jr., former Chiefs of Staff of the Air Force Generals Larry D. Welch and Ronald Fogleman, former Commander of Strategic Command Admiral James O. Ellis, former Vice Chiefs of Staff of the Air Force Generals Thomas S. Moorman Jr. and Lester Lyles, former Commander of Air Force Space Command General Lance W. Lord, former Assistant Secretaries of the Air Force Tidal W. McCoy and Sue C. Payton, former Assistant Secretaries of the Air Force for Space and National Reconnaissance Office Directors Martin C. Faga, Jeffrey K. Harris, and Keith R. Hall, Assistant Director of the Central Intelligence Agency Charles E. Allen, former National Reconnaissance Office Director Scott F. Large, former Directors of the National Geospatial-Intelligence Agency Letitia Long, Robert Cardillo, and Vice Admiral Robert B. Murrett, former Deputy Undersecretaries of Defense for Space Policy Marc Berkowitz and Douglas Loverro, former Commander of the Space and Missile Systems Center Brian A. Arnold, former Director of the Defense Intelligence Agency Ronald L. Burgess Jr., former Deputy Undersecretary of the Air Force for Space and astronaut Gary Payton, Deputy Director of the National Reconnaissance Office and Principal Deputy Assistant Secretary of the Air Force for Space David Kier, former Air Force astronaut Colonel Pamela Melroy. The list also includes the former Deputy Commander of U.S. Space Command, and the former Deputy Commander of U.S. Cyber Command, and the Chairman of the Allard Commission on National Security Space.

In June 2019 and July 2019, the Senate and the House passed their own versions of the National Defense Authorization Act for Fiscal Year 2020, with the Senate proposing a Space Force, and the House (via Representatives Jim Cooper and Mike Rogers) proposing a Space Corps. The Senate version had been proposed by the Senate Armed Services Committee, with Senator Kevin Cramer (R-ND) having "played a key role in crafting" the leadership model of the Space Force, reported NPR. Negotiations were required as the House, Senate, and the Department of Defense all disagreed with aspects of the Space Force / Space Corps plan. On 9 December 2019, the Armed Services Committees of the House and the Senate announced an agreement regarding creating the Space Force. By 17 December 2019, the House and the Senate, with vote margins of 377–48 and 82–8 respectively, passed a compromise version of the National Defense Authorization Act for Fiscal Year 2020 which included the Space Force. The Center for Strategic and International Studies think tank commented that the version of the Space Force approved by Congress was a mixture of the proposals by the House and Senate: "While the decision on Title 10 authorities favored the House, many of the details of implementation favored the Senate, including the name of the new service and how space acquisition would be structured."

On 20 December 2019, President Donald Trump signed the National Defense Authorization Act for Fiscal Year 2020 into law, which included legislative provisions for creation of the Space Force, under the United States Space Force Act. The Space Force was established as the sixth armed service branch, with Air Force General John "Jay" Raymond, the commander of Air Force Space Command and U.S. Space Command, becoming the first chief of space operations. On 14 January 2020, Raymond was officially sworn in as chief of space operations by Vice President Mike Pence.

=== Raymond era ===
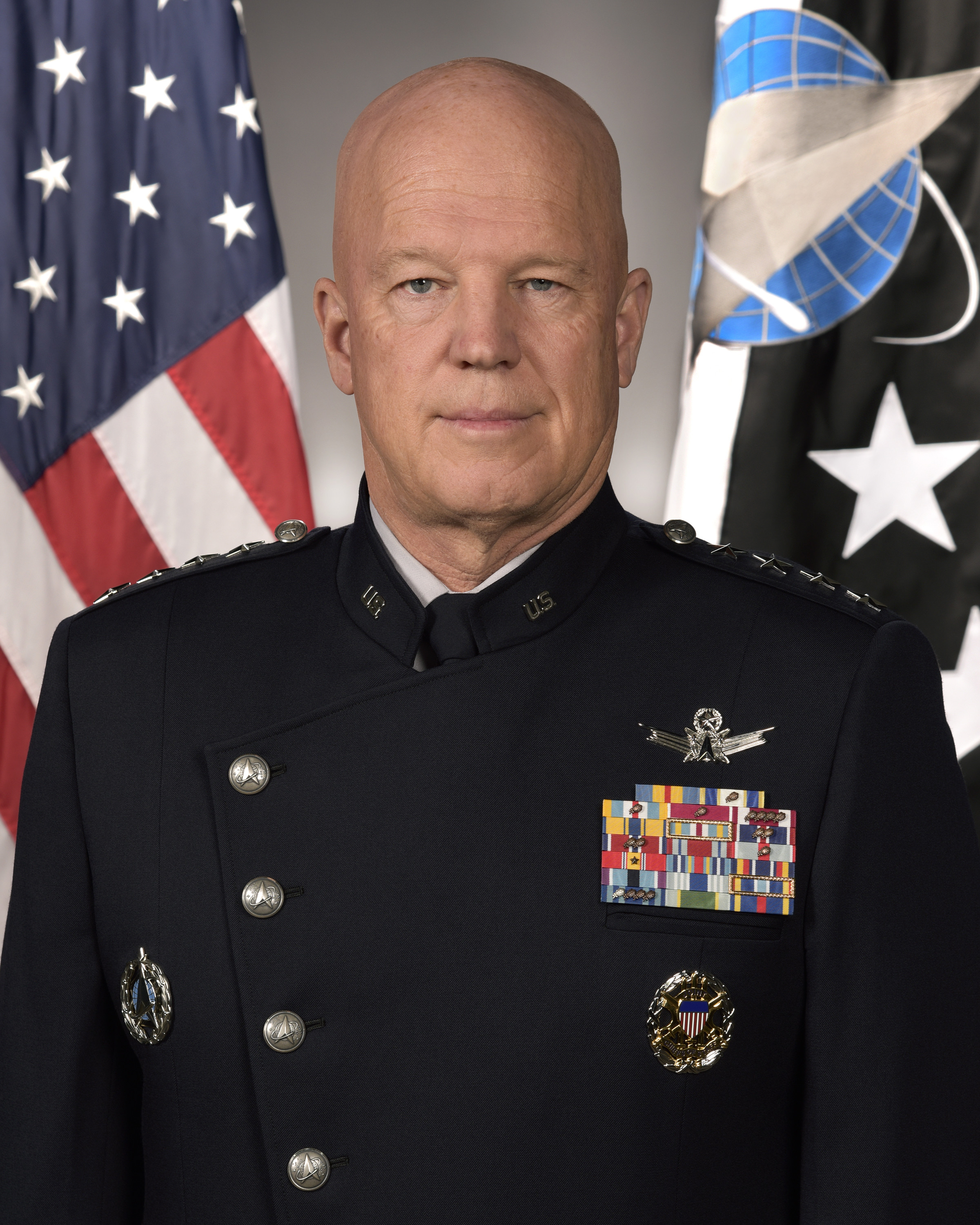
General John Raymond is the Space Force's first member and chief of space operations.

On 20 December 2019, Air Force Space Command was redesignated as the United States Space Force. In January, its commander, General John W. Raymond was sworn in as its first Chief of Space Operations. On 20 December, its first organizational change occurred when Secretary of the Air Force Barbara Barrett redesignated Air Force Space Command's Fourteenth Air Force as Space Operations Command. All of Air Force Space Command's 16,000 active duty and civilian personnel were assigned to the new service.

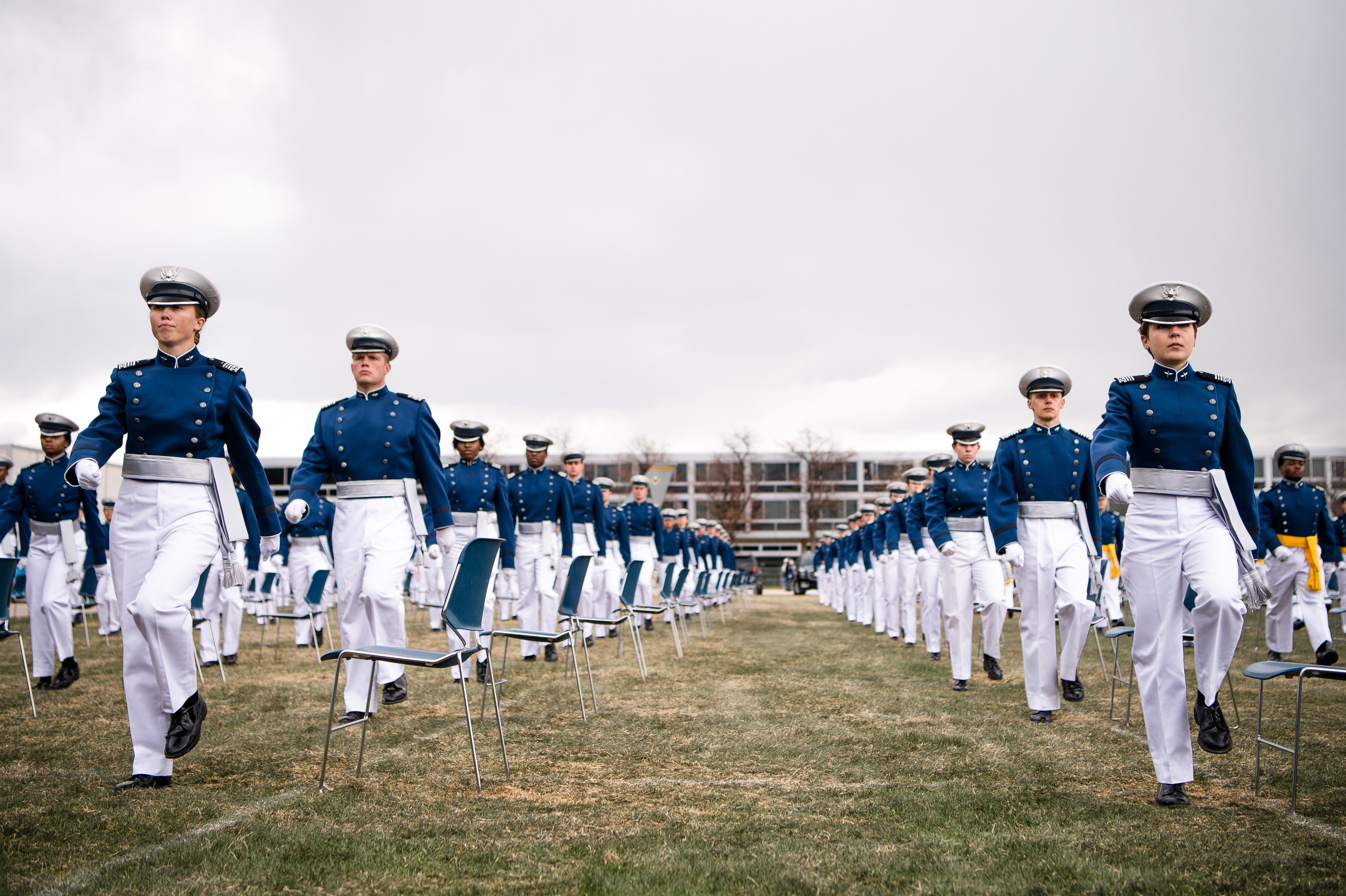
The United States Air Force Academy commissioned the first 86 Space Force lieutenants on 18 April 2020 from the members of the class of 2020.

Major organizational changes during the first year included replacing its space wings and operations groups with deltas and garrisons on 24 July 2020 and announcing its field command structure, merging wings and groups into deltas and numbered air forces and major commands into field commands. The Space Force announced that its field commands would be Space Operations Command, Space Systems Command, and Space Training and Readiness Command (STARCOM). Space Training and Readiness Delta (Provisional) absorbed former Air Education and Training Command and Air Combat Command space units, preparing for the activation of STARCOM. Space Delta 2 became the space domain awareness delta, replacing the 21st Operations Group; Space Delta 3 became the space electronic warfare delta, replacing the 721st Operations Group; Space Delta 4 became the missile warning delta, replacing 460th Operations Group and absorbing the ground-based missile warning radars of the 21st Operations Group; Space Delta 5 became the command and control delta, replacing the 614th Air Operations Center; Space Delta 6 became the cyberspace operations delta, replacing the 50th Network Operations Group; Space Delta 7 became the intelligence, surveillance, and reconnaissance delta, replacing Air Combat Command's 544th Intelligence, Surveillance and Reconnaissance Group; Space Delta 8 became the satellite communication and navigation warfare delta, replacing the 50th Operations Group; Space Delta 9 became the orbital warfare delta, replacing the 750th Operations Group; the Peterson-Schriever Garrison became responsible for the base administration of Peterson Air Force Base, Schriever Air Force Base, Cheyenne Mountain Air Force Station, Thule Air Base, New Boston Air Force Station, and Kaena Point Satellite Tracking Station, replacing the 21st Space Wing and the 50th Space Wing; the Buckley Garrison became responsible for the base administration of Buckley Air Force Base, Cape Cod Air Force Station, Cavalier Air Force Station, and Clear Air Force Station, replacing the 460th Space Wing. On 21 October 2020, Space Operations Command was established as its first field command, replacing headquarters Air Force Space Command. The first Space Operations Command (redesignated Fourteenth Air Force) was redesignated as Space Operations Command-West and its air and space lineage was split between the Air Force and the Space Force.

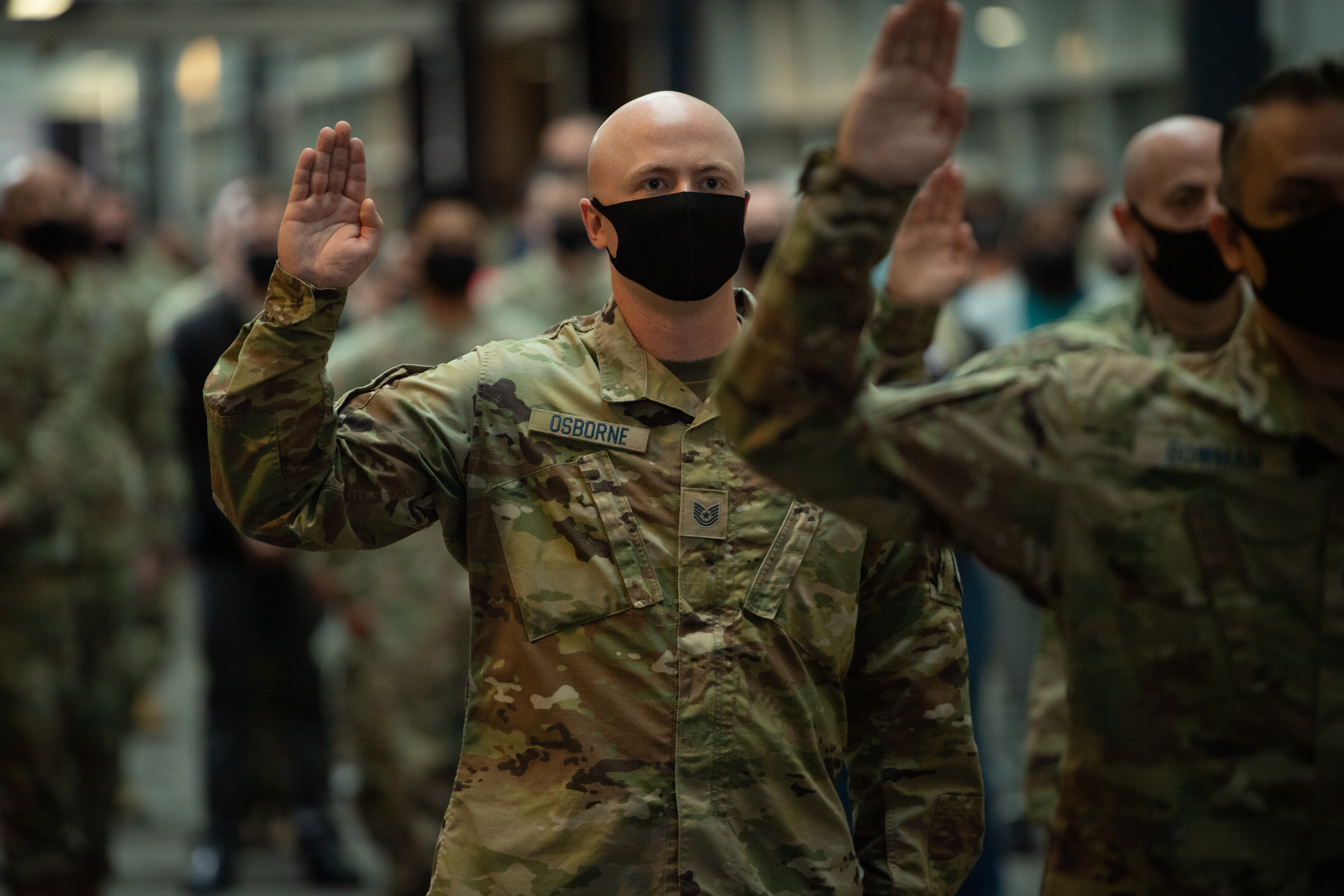
Tech Sgt. Brandon Osborne takes the oath of enlistment as one of the first members of the United States Army to transfer into the Space Force on 1 October 2021.

On 3 April 2020, Chief Master Sergeant Roger A. Towberman, formerly command chief of Air Force Space Command, transferred to the Space Force as the Senior Enlisted Advisor of the Space Force, becoming its second member and first enlisted member. On 18 April 2020, 86 graduates of the United States Air Force Academy became the first group of commissioned second lieutenants in the U.S. Space Force, becoming the 3rd to 88th members of the Space Force. On 16 July 2020, the Space Force selected 2,410 space operations officers and enlisted space systems operators to transfer to the Space Force, with the first back recommissioning or reenlisting on 1 September. The Space Force swore in its first 7 enlisted recruits on 20 October 2020, graduating basic military training on 10 December 2020 and its first Officer Training School candidates commissioned on 16 October. The Space Force also commissioned its first astronaut, with Colonel Michael S. Hopkins, the commander of SpaceX Crew-1, swearing into the Space Force from the International Space Station on 18 December 2020.

During the first year major symbols were also unveiled, with the Seal of the United States Space Force approved on 15 January 2020 and was revealed on 24 January 2020, the flag of the United States Space Force debuted at signing ceremony for the 2020 Armed Forces Day proclamation on 15 May 2020, the Space Force Delta symbol and motto of Semper Supra released on 22 July 2020, and the official service title of Guardian announced on 18 December 2020. The first Air Force instillations were renamed to Space Force instillations on 9 December 2020, with Patrick Air Force Base and Cape Canaveral Air Force Station renamed as Patrick Space Force Base and Cape Canaveral Space Force Station.

In September 2020, the Space Force and NASA signed a memorandum of understanding formally acknowledging the joint role of both agencies. This new memorandum replaced a similar document signed in 2006 between NASA and Air Force Space Command. On October 20, 2020, the first seven guardians enlisted directly into the Space Force. On 20 September 2022, the Space Force unveiled its official anthem, the march "Semper Supra" ("Always Above"), in a performance by the United States Air Force Band during the 2022 Air & Space Forces Association Air, Space and Cyber Conference at National Harbor, Maryland.

The Space Force's first combat operations as a new service included providing early warning of Iranian Islamic Revolutionary Guard Corps Aerospace Force missile strikes against U.S. troops at Al Asad Airbase on 7 January 2020 through the 2nd Space Warning Squadron's Space Based Infrared System. The Space Force also monitored Russian Space Forces spacecraft which had been tailing U.S. government satellites. On 1 October 2021, the first six U.S. Army soldiers, all assigned to Space Operations Command, were inducted into the Space Force at Peterson Space Force Base.

Raymond retired as CSO on November 2, 2022.

=== Middle Eastern crisis ===
During the Iran–Israel conflict in 2024, the Space Force provided missile warning for the strikes conducted by Iran against Israel in April 2024 and in October 2024. It also planned for Iranian retaliation in anticipation of Operation Midnight Hammer in June 2025. The Space Force is also involved in the Israeli–U.S. war against Iran in 2026 by assisting with communications, targeting, and navigation.

On 28 August 2026, Trump signed a presidential proclamation directing the establishment of the United States Space Academy, an institution similar to West Point that would serve as a training academy for NASA, the Space Force, and the private spaceflight sector.

== See also ==
- History of spaceflight
- Space Race
- Space policy of the United States
