= Pantić =

Pantić (Serbian Cyrillic: Пантић, pronounced [pǎːntitɕ]) is a Serbian surname. It may refer to:

- Aleksandar Pantić (footballer born 1978) (born 1978), Serbian footballer
- Aleksandar Pantić (footballer born 1992) (born 1992), Serbian footballer for Red Star Belgrade
- Danilo Pantić (born 1996), Serbian footballer
- Dano Pantić (born 1972), Serbian judoka
- Đorđe Pantić (born 1980), Serbian footballer
- Maja Pantić, Serbian computer scientist
- Milinko Pantić (born 1966), Serbian footballer
- Mladen Pantić (born 1982), Serbian basketball player
- Snežana Pantić (born 1978), Serbian karate competitor
- Zorica Pantic (born c. 1951), Yugoslav college administrator and professor of electrical engineering
