= Zorica Pantić =

Yugoslavian-American electrical engineer

Zorica Pantić, also known as Zorica Pantić-Tanner, born 1951 in Yugoslavia, is a professor of electrical engineering and past president of Wentworth Institute of Technology in Boston.

Pantić was previously the founding dean of the College of Engineering at the University of Texas at San Antonio, and director of the School of Engineering at San Francisco State University. She served as president of Wentworth Institute of Technology from 2005 to 2019.

== Early life and education ==
Zorica Pantić received her B.S., M.S., and Ph.D. degrees in electrical engineering from the University of Niš, Yugoslavia (Serbia), in 1975, 1978, and 1982, respectively. She has 30 years of academic and teaching experience. She served on the engineering faculty of the University of Nis (1975–1984), San Francisco State University (1989–2001), and the University of Texas at San Antonio (2001–2004). She was a Fulbright Fellow and a visiting scientist at the University of Illinois at Urbana-Champaign from 1984-1989.

== Career ==
=== Affiliations ===
She is a senior member of IEEE and served on various committees of the IEEE Electromagnetic Compatibility Society (EMC-S) until 2004. She served on the EMC-S Board of Directors and as chair, vice-chair, treasurer, and secretary of the Santa Clara Valley EMC-S Chapter. She is also a member of the American Society for Engineering Education and serves on the ASEE Projects Board, President's Award Committee, and Contact Committee.

She is a member of the IEEE Women in Engineering, Society of Women Engineers, and American Society for Higher Education, as well as a member of the Engineering Deans Council and the EDC Public Policy Committee. She served on various National Academy of Engineering panels and committees.

Pantić received the Woman Entrepreneur of the Year award from the San Antonio Women Chamber of Commerce and is a graduate of the Leadership America program.

She is included in the Encyclopedia of the National Diaspora, edited by chronicler Ivan Kalauzović Ivanus.

=== Research publications ===
Pantić has published more than 80 journal and conference papers. Her research areas have included uniform antennas, microwave transmission lines, the finite element method, and electromagnetic emissions.

=== At University of Texas at San Antonio (UTSA) ===
As the engineering dean at UTSA, she spearheaded the College of Engineering's and UTSA's efforts to become a flagship university in the state of Texas and a top-tier research university in the U.S.

During her tenure, the college started three new Ph.D. engineering programs (biomedical, electrical, and environmental) and one M.S. program (computer engineering). The college created a new Department of Biomedical Engineering and a Center for Response and Security Engineering and Technology, doubled the number of faculty, and increased its research funding tenfold to $7 million in active grants.

Pantić also secured $2.5 million in federal funding to establish a Material Science and Engineering Laboratory at the former Kelly Air Force Base. Through strategic partnerships with various state and national agencies, national companies and small businesses, she raised more than $5 million in various donations and equipment grants.

She revived relationships with engineering alumni and was instrumental in securing a $250,000 endowment donation, the single largest alumni gift to the college and UTSA. In her last four years, the college increased its enrollment by 75%, being especially effective in attracting female students (83% enrollment increase) and minorities (50% of students are Hispanic).

=== At San Francisco State University ===
While at SFSU, Pantić improved the engineering programs in quality, size and visibility, and, as a result—for the first time in SFSU history – the programs were ranked among the top 50 undergraduate programs by U.S. News & World Report.

She established a Partnership for Engineering Education that resulted in a 30 percent enrollment increase and played a crucial role in shaping and bringing to life a partnership with a neighboring community college to offer upper-division engineering courses there.

This project serves as a blueprint for cooperation between the 23-campus California State University (CSU) system, of which San Francisco State is a member, and California's community colleges. Through a partnership with the local chapter of the Institute of Electrical and Electronics Engineers (IEEE) and a major grant from the National Science Foundation, she established a Center for Applied Electromagnetics that supports undergraduate and graduate research.

Pantić was active in state-level fundraising for engineering programs. She worked with fellow CSU Engineering deans on the successful $10-million California Workforce Initiative to support strategic disciplines such as agriculture, biotechnology, computer science, engineering, and nursing. She also served on the Executive Committee of the Texas Engineering and Technology Consortium, a private-public partnership that raised $8 million to increase the number of engineering and computer science graduates in the state of Texas.

=== President of Wentworth Institute ===
Pantić's appointment as Wentworth Institute of Technology's fourth president was announced on June 8, 2005. She took office August 1, 2005 and was the first female engineer to head an institute of technology in the United States. She was formally installed as president of Wentworth on April 5, 2006.

Pantić retired as President of Wentworth on May 31, 2019, after 14 years at its helm.

== Literature ==
- Kalauzović, I., ed. (2024). Encyclopedia of the National Diaspora. Niš, Serbia: Impressions Publishing. ISBN 978-86-82470-02-1.
