= The Paisano =

Student newspaper of the University of Texas at San Antonio

- Type: Student newspaper
- Format: Broadsheet; Website
- Owner: Independent
- Publisher: The Paisano Educational Trust
- Editor-in-chief: Jake Mireles
- Managing editor: Dustin Vickerss
- News editor: Laynie Clark
- Opinion editor: Marcela Montufar Soria
- Photo editor: Armin Suljovics
- Founded: 1981
- Headquarters: 14526 Roadrunner Way, San Antonio, Texas; United States
- Website: paisano-online.com

The Paisano (Spanish for "fellow countryman") is the independent student-run newspaper of the University of Texas at San Antonio (UTSA). It was established in 1981 and published its first issue on January 13 of the same year. The Paisano is the only independent student newspaper in the University of Texas System and one of approximately one dozen independent student newspapers in the nation.

The newspaper is published once a week except during exam and holiday periods. Because it is student-run and independent from University administration, The Paisano is written completely by unpaid volunteers, with advertisements helping to support the costs associated with printing and distributing. The Paisano won a gold medal in 2000 from the Columbia Scholastic Press Association. In 2005 SA Current magazine named The Paisano the Best College Newspaper in San Antonio. The office for the newspaper is located at 14526 Roadrunner Way, across the street from the Main UTSA campus.
