= Taylor Eighmy =

American engineer and academic

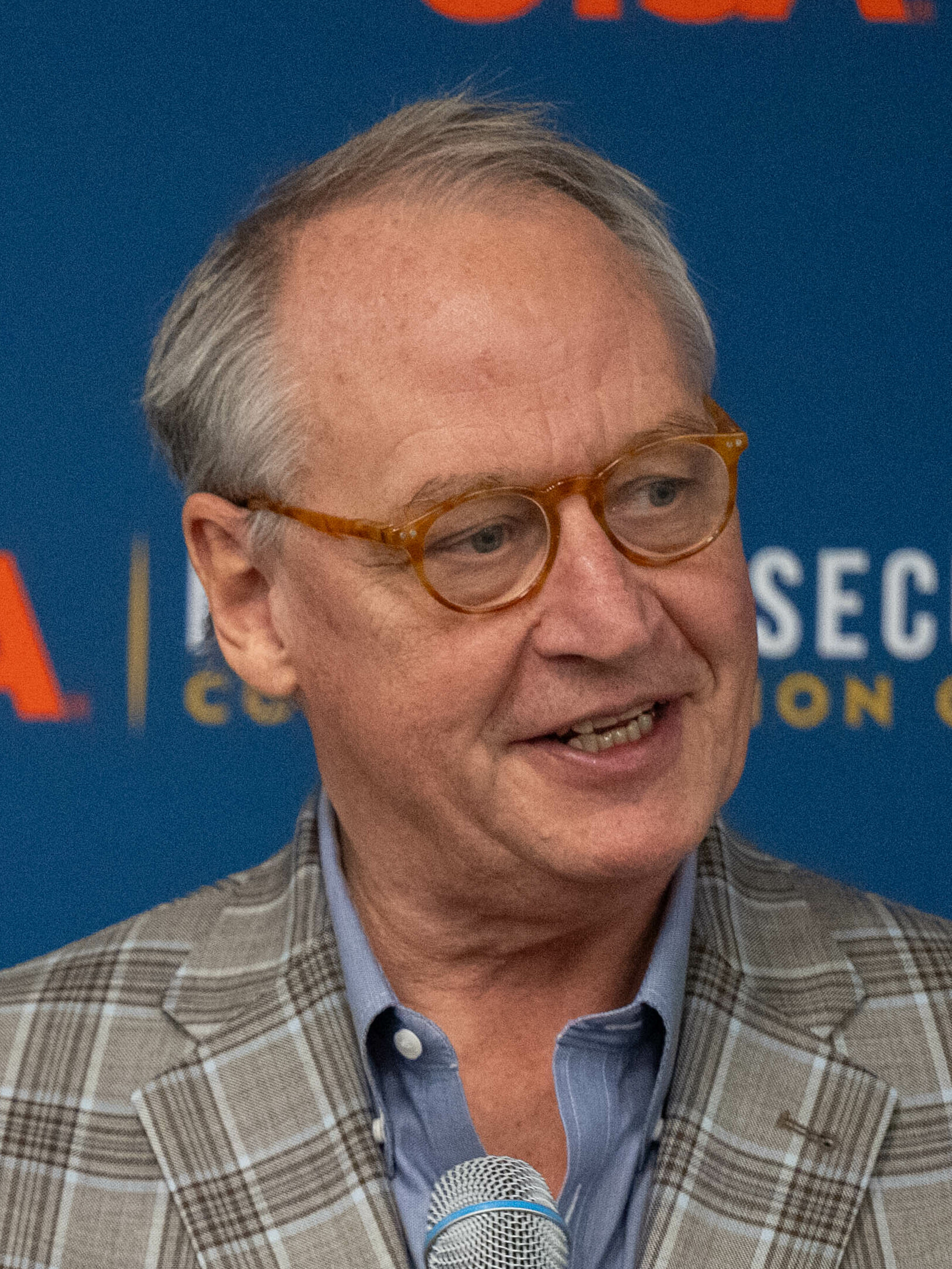
- Eighmy in 2023

6th President of the University of Texas at San Antonio
- Incumbent
- Assumed office September 1, 2017
- Preceded by: Pedro Reyes (interim)

Personal details
- Spouse: Peggy
- Children: 1
- Education: Tufts University (BS); University of New Hampshire (MS, PhD)
- Scientific career
- Fields: Environment science
- Institutions: University of New Hampshire; Texas Tech University; University of Tennessee; University of Texas at San Antonio
- Thesis: An investigation of aquatic macrophyte-based aquatic wastewater treatment systems for temperate climates (elodea nuttallii, photosynthesis, nutrient budget, active transport, nitrification) (1986)
- Doctoral advisor: Paul Bishop

Thomas Taylor Eighmy is an American engineer and academic administrator serving as the sixth president of the University of Texas at San Antonio. Effective February 2025, he will also serve as the acting president of UT Health San Antonio.

== Education ==
Eighmy graduated from Tufts University in 1980 with a B.S. in biology. He earned a M.S. in civil engineering in 1983 and a Ph.D. in environmental engineering in 1986, both from the University of New Hampshire.

== Career ==
Eighmy served as the vice president for research at the University of New Hampshire from 2006 to 2009, when he took the same position at Texas Tech University. From 2012 to 2017, he served as the vice chancellor of research and engagement at the University of Tennessee. In that position, he helped establish the University of Tennessee's Institute for Advanced Composites Manufacturing Innovation, a public–private partnership supported by the United States Department of Energy. He also established the university's Office of Undergraduate Research.

Eighmy was named the sole finalist for the presidency of UTSA in June 2017. His presidency began on September 1, 2017; the formal inauguration was on March 20, 2018. He also serves as a member of UTSA's faculty with appointments in the department of civil and environmental engineering, and the department of environmental science and ecology.

=== Research ===
Eighmy's research focuses on element speciation, environmental chemistry of leaching behavior, spectroscopic surface analysis, applied geochemistry, reactive barriers, reactive transport modeling, environmental microbiology, biofouling, biofilms, sustainability, carbon sequestration, carbon cycling, and recycled materials.

== Honors and awards ==
Eighmy is a fellow of the American Association for the Advancement of Science and the National Academy of Inventors. He is a diplomate of the American Academy of Environmental Engineers and Scientists. He holds a patent for a phosphate mineral-based reactive barrier containment system. He served as the chairman of the board of directors of the Institute for Advanced Composites Manufacturing Innovation from 2015 to 2017.

He serves on the boards of the Coalition of Urban Serving Universities, Texas Biomedical Research Institute, San Antonio Medical Foundation, World Affairs Council of San Antonio, United Way of San Antonio and Bexar County, Texas International Education Consortium and Conference USA. He is a member of the Council of Public University Presidents and Chancellors, the Council on Competitiveness, and an advisory trustee of Southwest Research Institute.

== Personal life ==
Eighmy and his wife Peggy have one daughter, Hannah.
