= University of Texas at San Antonio College of Liberal and Fine Arts =

UTSA College of Liberal and Fine Arts
- Former names: • College of Humanities and Social Sciences (1975-2000)
- Type: Public Liberal/Fine Arts school
- Established: 1975
- Affiliations: University of Texas at San Antonio
- Dean: Glenn A. Martinez, PhD MPH
- Faculty: 258
- Students: 4,200
- Location: San Antonio, Texas, United States
- Campus: Urban
- Website: colfa.utsa.edu/colfa

The University of Texas at San Antonio College of Liberal and Fine Arts (known to many students as "COLFA") is UTSA's largest college. It offers degrees through its 11 departments, administering 33% of all UTSA credit hours.

== Departments ==
=== Anthropology ===
UTSA's Department of Anthropology uses the four-field approach towards the study of humanity. It believes this provides students with a well-rounded understanding of the discipline.

=== Art & Art History ===
The School of Art has a variety of programs, to include Art History, Ceramics, New Media, Painting, Photography, Printmaking and Sculpture. It hosts an annual display of school talent, called the "Student Exhibit", during the spring semester. There are over 400 art majors within the Department of Art and Art History at UTSA.

=== Communication ===
The Department of Communication is another component to the College of Liberal and Fine Arts. It currently offers both graduate and undergraduate degrees. The University of Texas at San Antonio houses a collection of records from the Communication Department.

=== English ===
The Department of English houses roughly 600 English undergraduates and 100 graduate students. The University of Texas at San Antonio houses a collection of records from the Writing Program. The collection spans the dates 1990 through 2003, comprising syllabi for UTSA's Writing Program courses.

=== Music ===
In September 2022, the UTSA Department of Music was rechristened as the UTSA School of Music. The shift into a school from a department is an outcome of the COLFA Tactical Visioning Process that began in 2021 and presents a more accurate representation of how the program has evolved since its founding in 1974.

The school has over 60 faculty members serving over 300 music majors and dance minors, as well as additional students from across the university who participate in music and dance courses as electives.

The University of Texas at San Antonio houses a collection of records from the UTSA School of Music. The collection spans the years 1975 through 2006 and includes programs of recitals and concerts of the faculty and students of the UTSA School of Music. Also included are black-and-white photographs of various performances and events.
