= UTSA College of Engineering and Integrated Design =

Educational Institute in the US

Coordinates: 29.582267°N 98.617876°W

Margie and Bill Klesse College of Engineering and Integrated Design (KCEID)
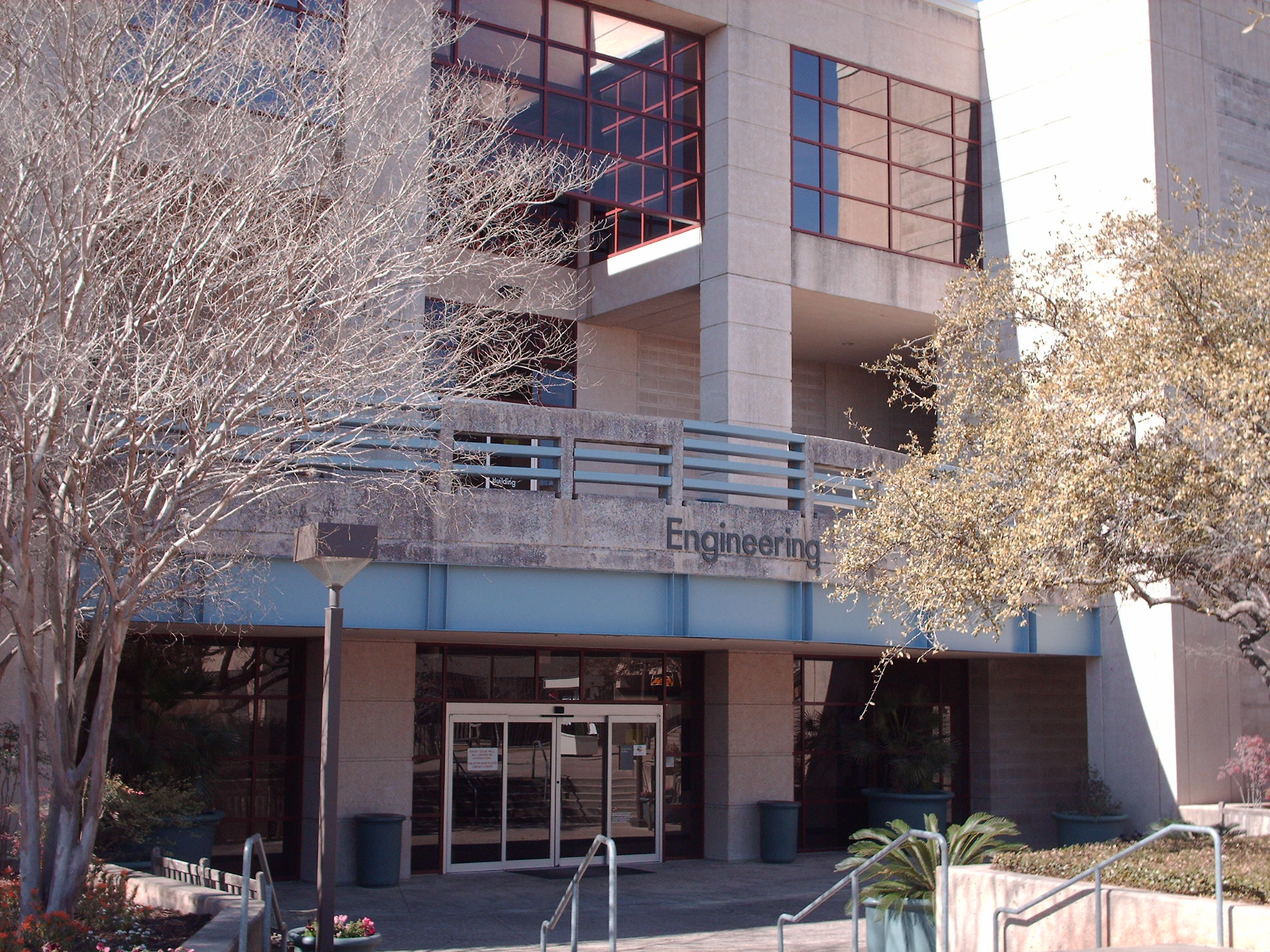
- Original Engineering Building
- Parent institution: University of Texas at San Antonio
- Dean: JoAnn Browning, Ph.D., P.E.
- Academic staff: 177 (2020)
- Undergraduates: 3,606 (2020)
- Postgraduates: 440 (2020)
- Doctoral students: 235 (2020)
- Location: San Antonio
- Website: https://kceid.utsa.edu/

The Margie and Bill Klesse College of Engineering and Integrated Design (KCEID) is The University of Texas at San Antonio's engineering and architectural design college. It is the result of the 2021 merger of the university's College of Engineering and College of Architecture, Construction, and Planning.

KCEID provides undergraduate degrees in the fields of biomedical engineering, chemical engineering, civil and environmental engineering, electrical engineering, mechanical engineering, construction science and management, architecture, and interior design. Graduate degrees are also offered in multiple areas, including biomedical engineering.

As engineering students reach their senior year, they must choose a concentration. A concentration is a more specific area in one's field of study, where the student is required to take classes in that concentration. For electrical engineering, the concentrations offered are control systems, computer engineering, and communications. The engineering departments puts a heavy emphasis on engineering science and practical applications. Before graduation, an engineering student will have a firm foundation not only in the necessary mathematics, but also with computer applications that will be used in the engineering career field.

On December 9, 2021, the same year the college was launched, it was announced that the college would be renamed after former Valero CEO William R. Klesse, who donated $20 million to the university.

== Departments and Programs ==
| Program | B.S. | M.S. | Ph.D. | Other |
|---|---|---|---|---|
| Advanced Manufacturing and Enterprise Engineering | | | | |
| Aerospace Engineering | | | | 2 |
| Architecture | | | | |
| Artificial Intelligence | | | | 2 |
| Biomedical Engineering | | | | 1 |
| Chemical Engineering | | | | |
| Civil & Environmental Engineering | | | | |
| Computer Engineering | | | | |
| Construction Science & Management | | | | 1 |
| Electrical Engineering | | | | |
| Facility Management | | | | 1 |
| Industrial and Manufacturing Engineering | | | | 2 |
| Interior Design | | | | |
| Mechanical Engineering | | | | |
| Urban and Regional Planning Degree Program | | | | 1 |

1. Graduate Certificate of Specialization
2. Undergraduate Certificate of Specialization

== Facilities ==
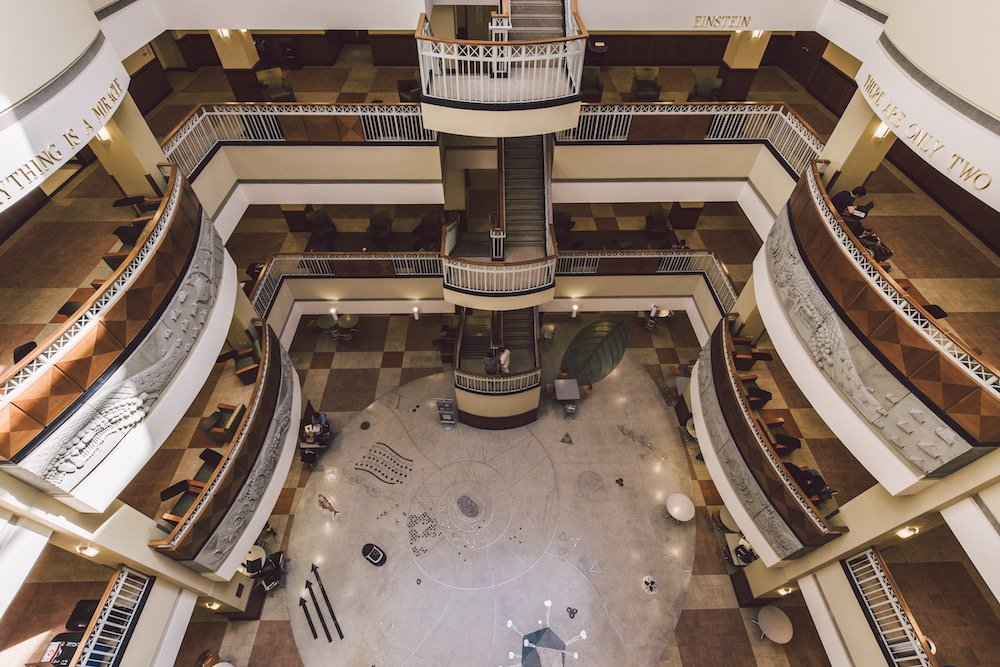
UTSA's Biotechnology, Sciences and Engineering Building

The Biotechnology, Sciences and Engineering building opened in 2006, and hosts new opportunities for engineering students. The building has also received recognition in the architecture community for its design and purpose. The offices of biotechnology, civil engineering, and electrical engineering department members are located here. Research is being heavily done in the areas of MEMS, photonics, and digital image processing.

The original engineering building offers multiple computer labs, a microcomputer lab, a lab with Sun Microsystems computers for a course in digital systems design, and two labs for students in practical, hands-on courses. The original building serves as the location for the mechanical engineering faculty offices as well.

According to the master plan of UTSA, the university is expecting to receive another large engineering building, and new research facilities located on the east side of the campus by the year 2030. Special housing options would also be available for students doing research for the university.

The newest addition, is the Applied Engineering & Technology (AET) Building. It was recently opened fall of 2009, and includes a student study space, research labs, and interactive learning classrooms.

== Student organizations ==
There are many student engineering organizations available to students. Some of the student branches of nationally known organizations are:

- AIChE - for chemical engineering students, providing networking opportunities and the chance to participate in the national level events like the ChemECar competition.
- ASCE – American Society of Civil Engineers for civil engineering students
- ASEE – for exploring engineering education
- ASHRAE – for students interested in heating, refrigeration, and air conditioning systems
- ASME – for mechanical engineering students
- Eta Kappa Nu – for electrical engineering honors students
- Formula SAE – Society of Automotive Engineers for students to participate in a competition to race formula cars
- IEEE – for electrical engineering students
- ITE – for students interested in transportation issues
- MAES – for Mexican-American engineers
- NACME – for minority students who are pursuing the engineering profession
- NSBE – for black engineering students pursuing the engineering profession
- SAE – for students interested in automotive engineering
- SHPE – for Hispanic engineering students
- SWE – for women in engineering
- Tau Beta Pi – for engineering honors students
- TSPE – for students who wish to become professional engineers
- SME – for students interested in manufacturing engineering
- College of Engineering Student Council – Umbrella organization, involved in aiding all organizations, and independent projects.

== Research ==
=== Electrical engineering ===
Electrical engineering faculty, funded by the Texas Higher Education Coordinating Board, conduct research in high performance multimedia processors and in muscle control using electromyographic signals. Research on 3-D spot counting is conducted in partnership with the Texas Engineering Experimental Station and on robotics and sensor based control and prognosis of complex distributed systems with the National Science Foundation.

The department is also working extensively in the areas of cyber security and homeland defense. Reliable and secure voice and data communications are important in mission success and in providing assurances to the public. Electromagnetic wave analysis regarding fallout may become necessary after a physical attack. Computer information security, high-speed intrusion detection, problem identification, reliable high-speed network design and redundancy are all important for cyber attack prevention; computer engineering faculty work with the Center for Infrastructure Assurance and Security in these efforts. Target analysis and radar signature identification help identify and track friends or foes.

Wireless communications that are hardened for recovery efforts are of great interest. An understanding of health physics is of particular importance in the case of nuclear and biological attack, and bio-MEMS (micro electromechanical systems) are used increasingly in health monitoring in such instances. Additionally, the doctoral program in Electrical Engineering focuses on communications, control, signal processing, and computers.

=== Mechanical engineering ===
Mechanical engineering faculty are working on topics such as nanotechnology and biomechanical systems, micro-electro-mechanical systems, nano-electro-mechanical systems, and mechatronics.

=== Civil engineering ===
Civil engineering faculty work with the Texas Department of Transportation to provide measures to improve truck safety, to develop methods and materials to accelerate construction and opening of PCC pavements, and to establish processes for equipment replacement. Additionally, transportation engineering and infrastructure management research allows for optimization and redundancy in transportation systems.

Working with the Center for Water Research, additional research into water quality and the more efficient use of water is being conducted. The new doctoral program in Environmental Science and Engineering emphasizes natural resources, and engineering faculty work with geologists, environmental scientists, chemists, and hydrogeologists. Research areas include environmental analysis, restoration, and water resource research focuses on recovery and remediation, especially in understanding the fate and transport of surface and groundwater pollutants.

=== Biomedical engineering ===
Biomedical engineering faculty work on topics such as the contribution of Type I collagen to mechanical properties of bone, importance of permeability in tissue engineering scaffolds, post-yield behavior of cortical bone, strengthening bioresorbable polymers, surface modification via formation of organic ultra thin films, and cell proliferation on scaffolds.
