= University of Texas at San Antonio =

Public university in San Antonio, Texas, US

The University of Texas at San Antonio
- Motto: Disciplina Praesidium Civitatis (Latin)
- Motto in English: "The cultivated mind is the guardian genius of democracy"
- Type: Public research university
- Established: June 5, 1969; 57 years ago
- Parent institution: University of Texas System
- Accreditation: SACS
- Academic affiliations: ORAU; Space-grant
- Endowment: $1.15 billion (FY2024) (UTSA only) $47.47 billion (FY2024) (system-wide)
- Budget: $2.51 billion (FY2025)
- President: Taylor Eighmy
- Provost: Heather Shipley
- Faculty: 1,556 (fall 2024)
- Students: 38,223 (fall 2025)
- Undergraduates: 33,336 (fall 2025)
- Postgraduates: 4,887 (fall 2025)
- Location: San Antonio, Texas, United States; 29°35′00″N 98°37′15″W
- Campus: 725 acres (2.93 km^{2}) Downtown: 18 acres Hemisfair: 4 acres Medical Campus: 250 acres; Large city
- Newspaper: The Paisano
- Colors: Blue and orange
- Nickname: Roadrunners
- Sporting affiliations: NCAA Division I FBS – The American
- Mascot: Rowdy the Roadrunner
- Website: utsa.edu

The University of Texas at San Antonio (UTSA or UT San Antonio) is a public research university in San Antonio, Texas, United States. Established in 1969, UTSA is the largest university in San Antonio and the third-largest public research university in Texas by annual research expenditures, enrolling approximately 38,200 students across six campuses spanning about 1,200 acres.

UT San Antonio is classified among "R1: Doctoral Universities – Very High Research Activity", a status held by 187 of the approximately 4,000 degree-granting postsecondary institutions in the U.S., representing about 4.7% of universities nationwide. UTSA generates $7 billion in annual economic impact.

Student-athletes compete as the UTSA Roadrunners and are members of the American Conference. The football team, which was founded in 2009, previously competed in Conference USA, the WAC, and as a Football Championship Subdivision independent.

== History ==
=== Establishment (1969 to 1970s) ===
Governor Smith signs HB 42 in a ceremony at the Alamo, officially founding UTSA

The University of Texas at San Antonio was officially founded on June 5, 1969, by the 61st Texas Legislature as H.B. 42 and signed into law by Governor Preston Smith. Frank Lombardino, a conservative Democrat who represented northwest Bexar County in the state legislature, was known as the "father of UTSA" due to his impassioned advocacy for the institution. When Governor Smith signed the bill officially establishing the university, he did so on the back of Lombardino in a ceremony in front of the Alamo. At the university's inaugural commencement, the first diploma was also signed on Lombardino's back.

In 1970, the University of Texas Board of Regents appointed the university's first president, Arleigh B. Templeton, who served from 1970 to 1972, and received a land donation of 600 acres (2.4 km^{2}) in far northwest San Antonio for the site of UTSA. The architecture firm of Ford, Powell and Carson Inc. was assigned to develop a master plan for the university. O'Neil Ford, the designer of both the Tower of the Americas and the Trinity University tower (Murchison Tower), designed the campus to be evocative of an Italian village.

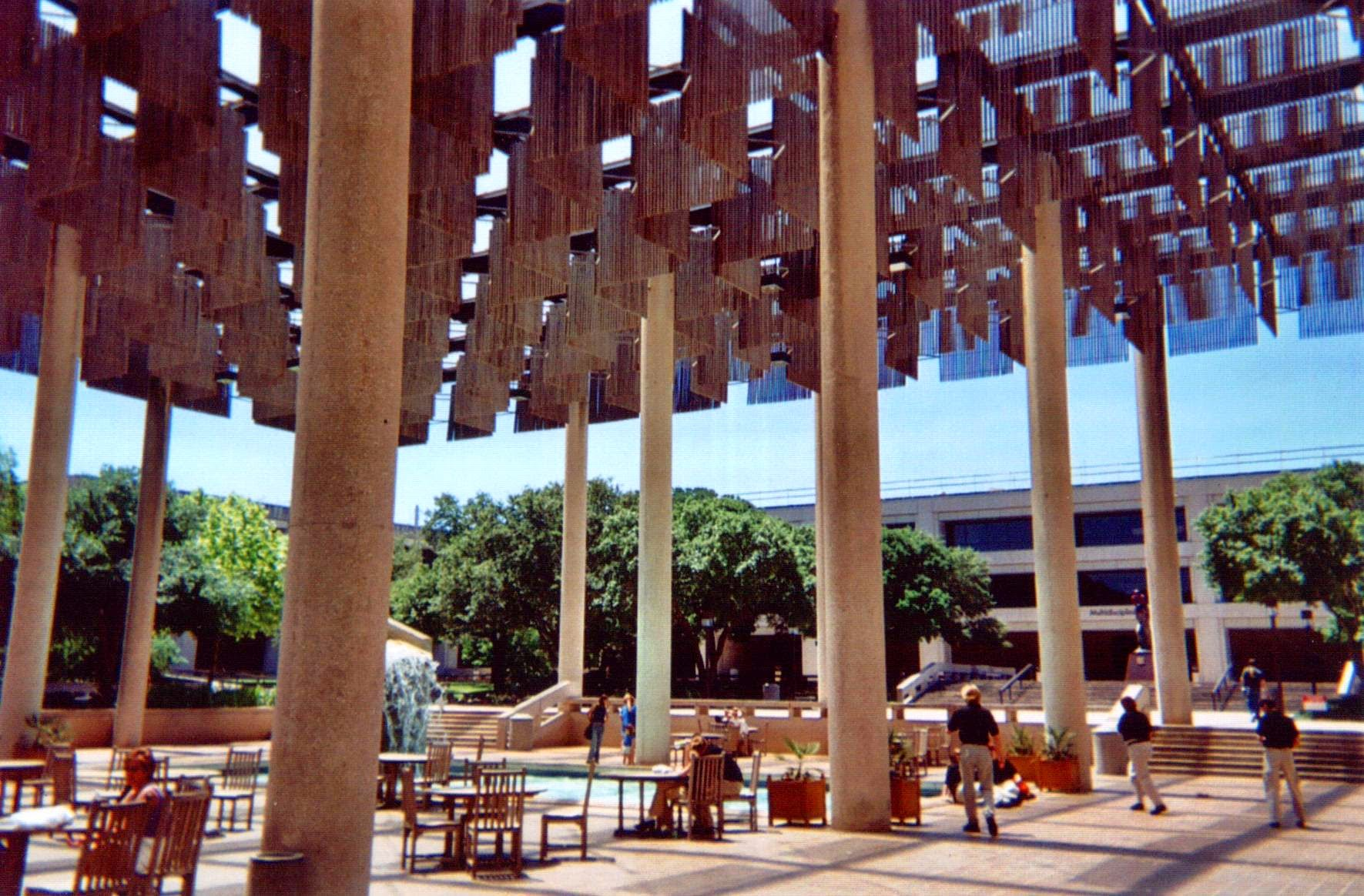
Sombrilla Plaza. O'Neil Ford, and Milton Babbitt designed the Main Campus, including this plaza.

The 671 graduate students composing the first class at the university began attending classes on June 5, 1973. Upperclassmen and lowerclassmen were admitted in 1975 and 1976, respectively. Students temporarily attended class at the Koger Center, which also housed administrative offices until 1975, when construction on the Main Campus was completed. Enrollment at this time numbered 4,433 students. UTSA began with five colleges: Business, Fine and Applied Arts, Humanities and Social Sciences, Multidisciplinary Studies, and Science and Mathematics.

By 1975, the university's colors were being discussed among student leaders and the administration. UTSA's third color of blue, in addition to orange and white, was selected, beating out other proposed colors such as "fiesta red" and "cactus green". The John Peace Library opened the next year, serving as the new administrative headquarters for the university.

The discussion of a university mascot soon followed the selection of school colors. In the fall of 1977, an election was held to determine the school's mascot, with "the armadillos" and "the stars" taking the top two spots. However, the referendum was declared void by the student government, and a new election was held with nine candidates and a write-in option. The top two choices from the second election, the roadrunner and the armadillo, campaigned in a competitive run-off. On December 9, 1977, the roadrunner was announced as UTSA's first and only mascot.

In 1978, James W. Wagener, a graduate of Southern Methodist University and former acting dean of the University of Texas Health Science Center, was selected to be UTSA's third president. The Alumni Association was formed that same year, providing a new avenue of support for the university. The first Fiesta UTSA was held in April 1978, with multiple bands playing throughout the day and culminating in a school dance. At the end of the 1970s, enrollment numbered 9,400 undergraduate and graduate students.

=== Continuing on (1980s to 1999) ===
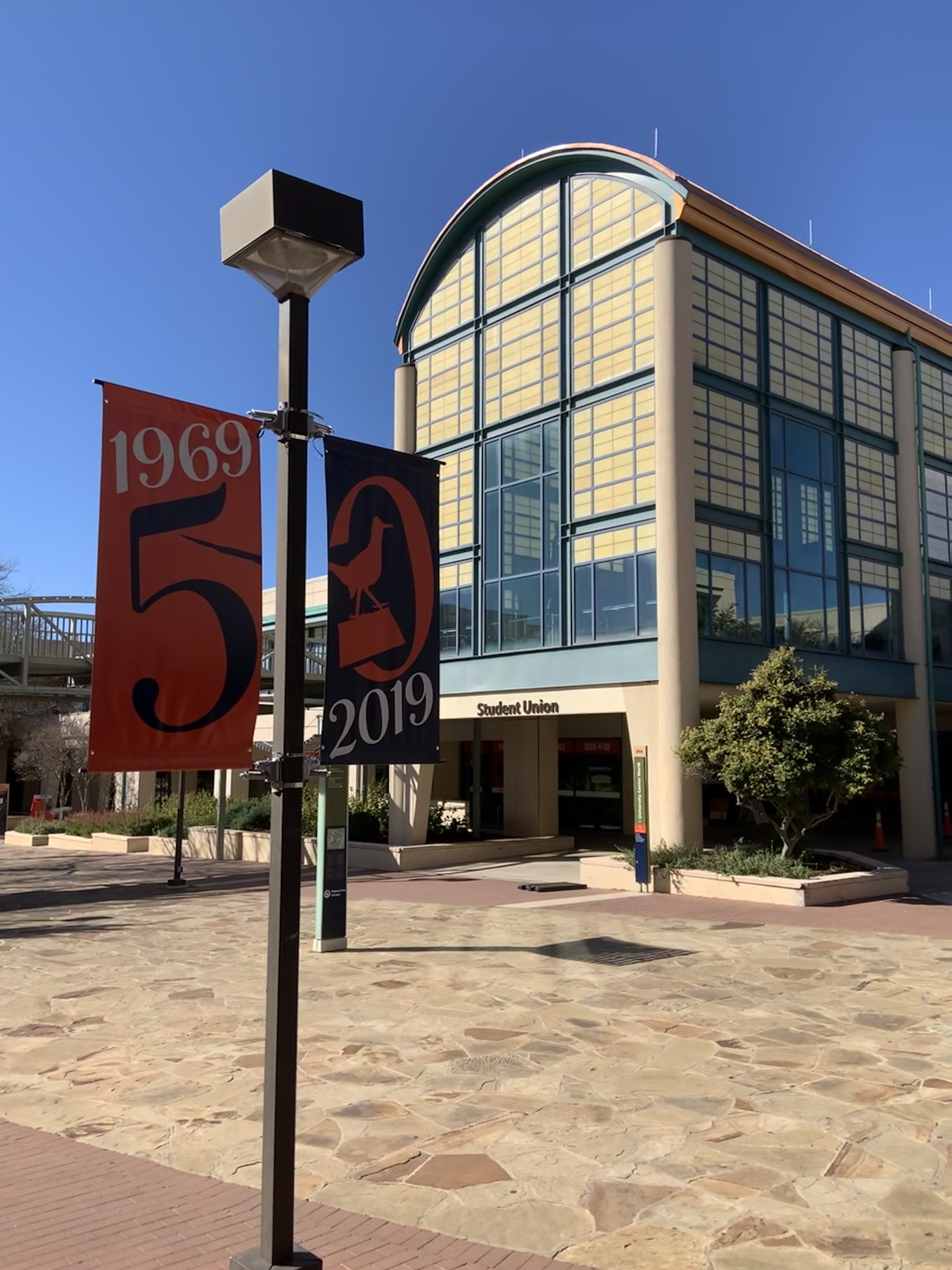
The Student Union (formerly the University Center) opened in 1986, with the first expansion (built in the 1990s)

The Paisano was established in 1981 as the first independent student publication in the state. During the fall of that year, the university began competing in intercollegiate athletics. It was immediately elected to Division I status in the NCAA. The Student Representative Assembly oversaw the burial of a time capsule in 1983, the university's 10th anniversary, instructing it to be opened on June 5, 2023.

In 1986, UTSA acquired the Institute of Texan Cultures, a center for multicultural education in the state, as a campus. During this year, both the University Center and Chisholm Hall, the university's first on-campus housing complex, opened.

In 1994, the U.S. Department of Education designated UTSA as a Hispanic Serving Institution (HSI).

On the first day of fall classes in 1996, a campus shooter stormed into the John Peace Library. The perpetrator, Gregory Tidwell, murdered head of cataloging Stephen L. Sorensen before fatally shooting himself in the chest.

The University Center expanded in the late 1990s, breaking ground in 1995 on the 97,500-square-foot, $13.2 million building, dubbed "UC Phase II", which included the new Retama Auditorium and UTSA Bookstore. The Downtown Campus opened the doors to its permanent location on Interstate Highway 10 and Durango Blvd. in 1997.

Ricardo Romo, a graduate of The University of Texas at Austin and UCLA, became UTSA's fifth president in May 1999. He began with the ambitious agenda of aggressively expanding UTSA, both physically and academically, laying out the university's "Roadmap to Excellence". During his tenure, UTSA would grow 68% in student enrollment while adding new programs and facilities.

=== Expansion and growth (2000 to 2009) ===
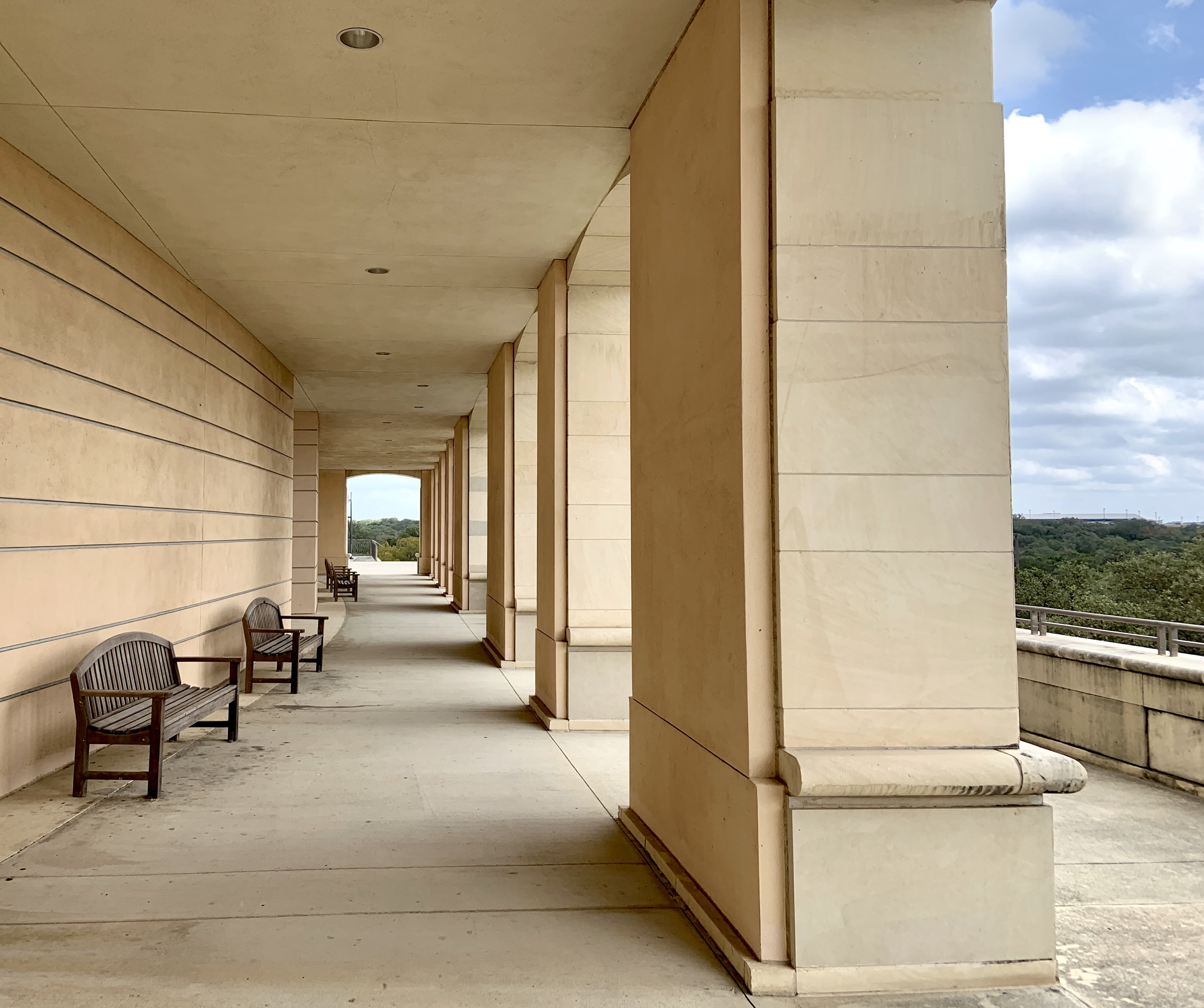
UTSA Main building looking over east campus

In the early 2000s, UTSA embarked on a long-term campaign to dramatically increase its national prestige and selectivity. A Master Plan was created in 2007 as a guide for this campaign and to direct the future physical growth of the institution. The UTSA 2016 strategic plan, formulated at the same time, is guided by the Master Plan and formed the basis for the development of the university into a "premier research institution" by 2016. John T. Montford—a San Antonio businessman, former chancellor of the Texas Tech University System, and a member of the Texas State Senate from 1983 to 1996—eventually established the UTSA President's Dinner and, in 2007, the event raised US$4.6 million.

From 2006 to 2009, UTSA completed over $250 million in construction projects. The $84 million, five-story Biotechnology, Sciences and Engineering (BSE) Building opened its doors in 2006. The university underwent extensive remodeling in 2009, renovating older buildings such as the John Peace Library (JPL), the Humanities and Social Sciences (HSS, now known as the McKinney Humanities or MH), and the Multidisciplinary Studies (MS) buildings. A new ceramics studio broke ground in 2009, and two adjacent science buildings underwent $24 million in renovations. The $83 million Applied Engineering and Technology building (AET) also opened its doors in 2009. A year later, the AET Library opened as the nation's first completely bookless library on a college or university campus.

Proposition 4 was passed by Texas voters in November 2009. This legislation names 7 emerging research universities in Texas, UTSA being one, that could compete for additional state funds in an effort to increase the number of Tier-One institutions in Texas. Factors such as research expenditures, graduate degrees awarded, and scholarly productivity all play a part in which schools receive the most funding.

=== Further expansion (2010 to 2020) ===
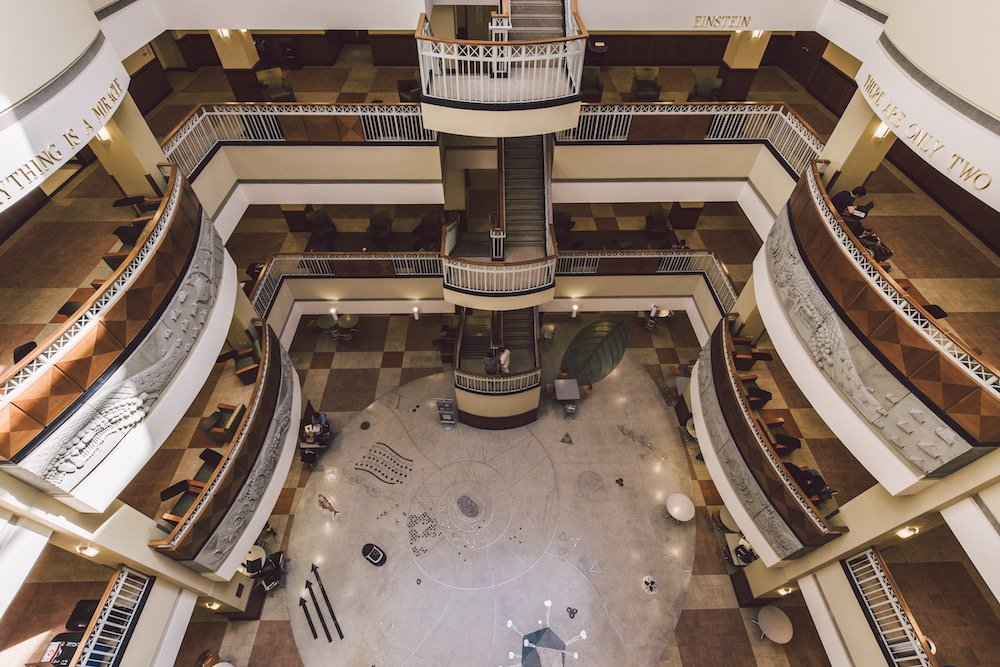
UTSA Biotechnology, Sciences, and Engineering Building

The first-time undergraduate acceptance rate was 60% for the Fall of 2013. U.S. News & World Report ranked UTSA's admissions process as "selective". In 2010, the university hit an enrollment benchmark of 30,000 students, signifying a growth rate of more than 39% over the past decade. UTSA was one of the fastest-growing universities in Texas during this decade, reaching an enrollment of nearly 31,000 students by 2012.

However, in 2011, the Center for College Affordability and Productivity ranked UTSA's freshmen as the second most "unhappy" in the country, based on low retention rates. The associate vice president and members of the Student Government Association refuted this claim.

That same year, the university fielded a football team as an NCAA Football Championship Subdivision independent, with Larry Coker as the inaugural head coach. The following year, 2012, UTSA, the city's sole NCAA Division I university at the time, became a member of the Western Athletic Conference; one year later, it moved to Conference USA.

In 2014, the "New" North Paseo building (NPB) was completed and now houses Computer Science and Cyber Security labs and classrooms. The NPB is also home to the Center for Infrastructure Assurance and Security (CIAS), the Center for Education and Research in Information and Infrastructure Security (CERIIS), and the Institute for Cyber Security.

Ricardo Romo, who had served as president since 1999, resigned on March 3, 2017, after having been placed on administrative leave. Pedro Reyes served as interim president from February through August 2017. On September 1, 2017, Thomas Taylor Eighmy, the vice chancellor for research and engagement at the University of Tennessee at Knoxville, began serving as UTSA's sixth president.

On June 9, 2017, UTSA introduced the largest construction project in its history with the announcement of a $95 million science and engineering building, which opened in fall 2020. On September 6, 2018, the university announced that it had received a $15 million gift from San Antonio business leader Graham Weston and a $70 million commitment from The University of Texas System Board of Regents for construction of two new facilities at its Downtown Campus for a National Security Collaboration Center and a proposed School of Data Science which opened January 9, 2023, and became the first and only data science school in the state of Texas.

Following an incident in 2018, where a student was escorted from a lecture hall, a professor was suspended for a separate classroom management issue, and later was not reinstated despite a petition from over 900 students.

=== Modern university (2021–present) ===
In 2021, the College of Engineering and the College of Architecture, Construction and Planning were merged to form the new College of Engineering and Integrated Design (CEID), which was officially launched on September 1, 2021. UTSA also acquired the Southwest School of Art, which became part of a new school within UTSA's College of Liberal and Fine Arts.

Toward the end of 2021, UTSA attained Carnegie Tier One research status. The university also announced a partnership with the University of Texas Health Science Center at San Antonio (UTHSCSA) to create a new School of Public Health. The first Master of Public Health (MPH) students were admitted in 2024, and Vasan Ramachandran was hired as dean of the new school.

In September 2023, UTSA introduced a dual degree combining medicine and artificial intelligence. Medical students spend four years at the University of Texas Health Science Center at San Antonio's (UT Health SA's) Long School of Medicine and one year at UTSA. Upon completion, graduates earn a Doctor of Medicine (M.D.) and a Master of Science degree in artificial intelligence. In January 2024, UTSA announced the creation of the College of AI, Cyber and Computing, which is centered on artificial intelligence, cybersecurity, and computer and data science. It launched in Fall 2025.

In August 2024, the University of Texas Board of Regents announced that UTSA and the UT Health Science Center at San Antonio would be merging to form a "world class university in San Antonio". The merged universities, approved by the Southern Association of Colleges and Schools Commission on Colleges (SACSCOC) in June 2025, retained the UTSA name, with current UTSA president Taylor Eighmy leading the new combined institution as of September 1, 2025.

== Campuses ==
=== Main Campus ===
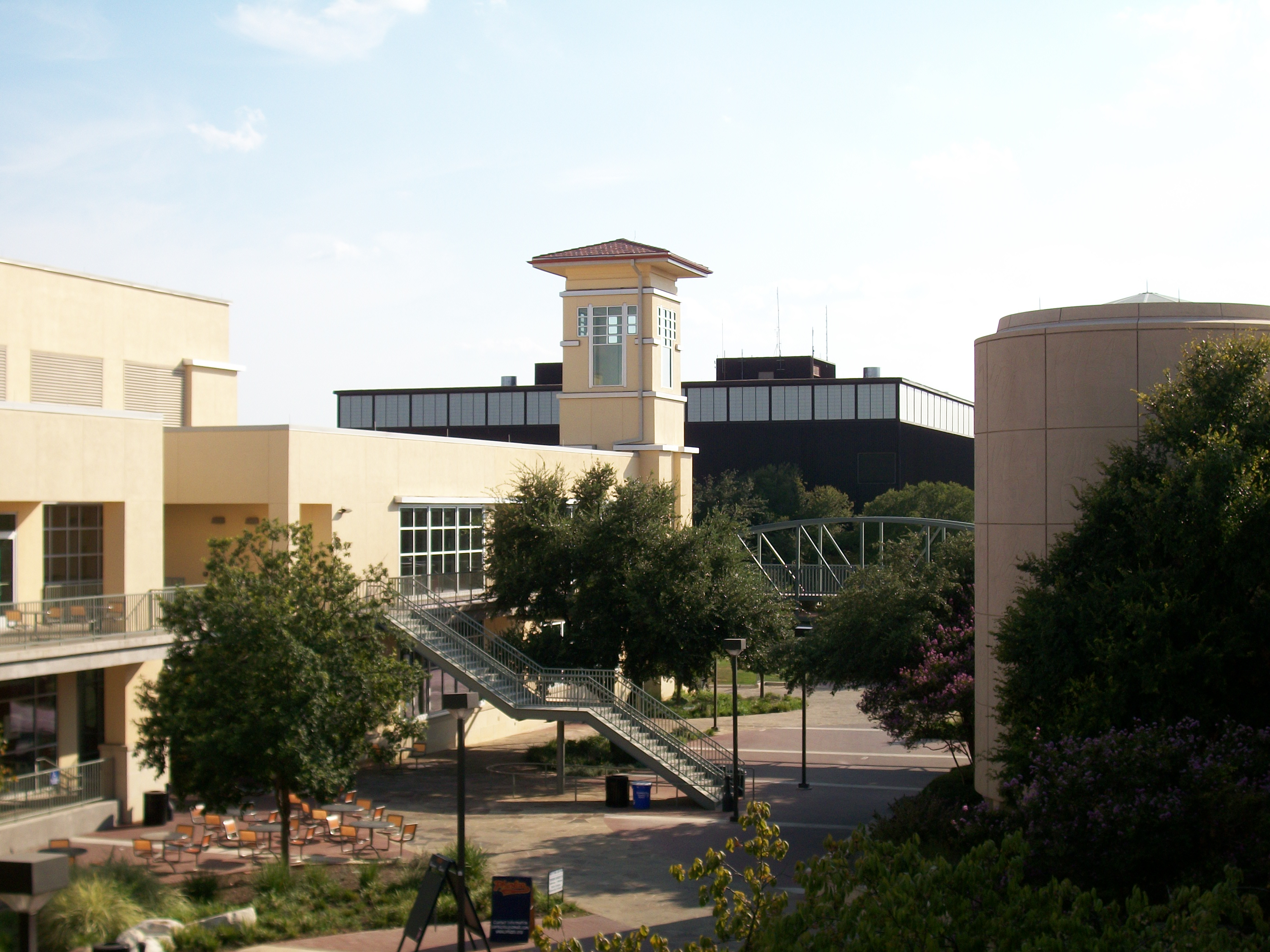
The West Paseo of the Main Campus, with the second Student Union expansion on the left, the Convocation Center in the distance, and the original Student Union building on the right.

The Main Campus, the original and largest, was born out of a 600-acre donation to the University of Texas Board of Regents. It proved to be so controversially remote to the city (at the time) that many San Antonians nicknamed it "University of Texas at Boerne" or "UT Boerne". The Main Campus opened its doors in 1975. Before that, classes were held at the Koger Center at Babcock Road and Loop 410. Chisholm Hall, the university's first dormitory, opened in Fall 1986. The Main Campus now boasts four residence halls, and three apartment-style "villages".Roadrunner Cafe, the Main Campus's dining hall, was opened in 2005. Until 2009, it was known as the "1604 Campus" (due to its Loop 1604 West address), at which point it was renamed the "Main Campus".

=== Downtown Campus ===
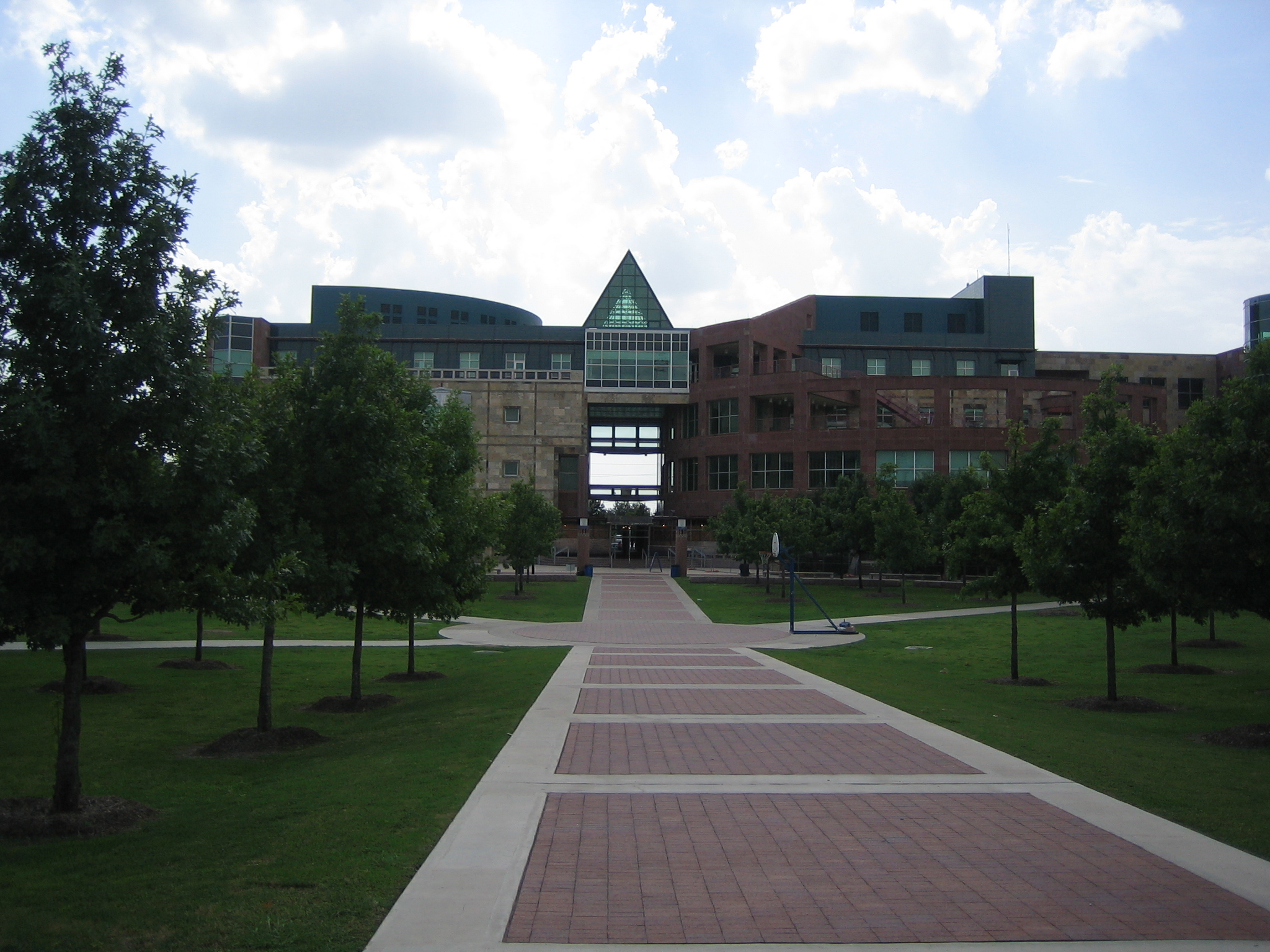
The Downtown Campus is on the west side of downtown San Antonio.

In early 1993, the demolition of Fiesta Plaza made way for what would become the Downtown Campus in Downtown San Antonio. While construction was underway, the campus made its temporary home at Cypress Tower on Main Street, offering its first classes in January 1994. Its permanent location on I-10 and Cesar E. Chavez Boulevard (formerly Durango Boulevard) was completed in 1997. The Downtown Campus is directly connected by bus to the Main Campus through Route 93 "Roadrunner Express", operated by VIA Metropolitan Transit.

The Downtown Campus houses parts of the College of Engineering and Integrated Design, College for Health, Community and Policy, and College of Education and Human Development. Many of the university's community outreach centers and institutes, including the Texas State Data Center and the Urban Education Institute, are located there.

Built along San Pedro Creek and Commerce St., the buildings San Pedro I and San Pedro II were opened in 2023 and 2026 respectively. They are home to the College of AI, Cyber, and Computing, and also house many support programs intended to connect students to careers in data science and cybersecurity.

=== Institute of Texan Cultures ===
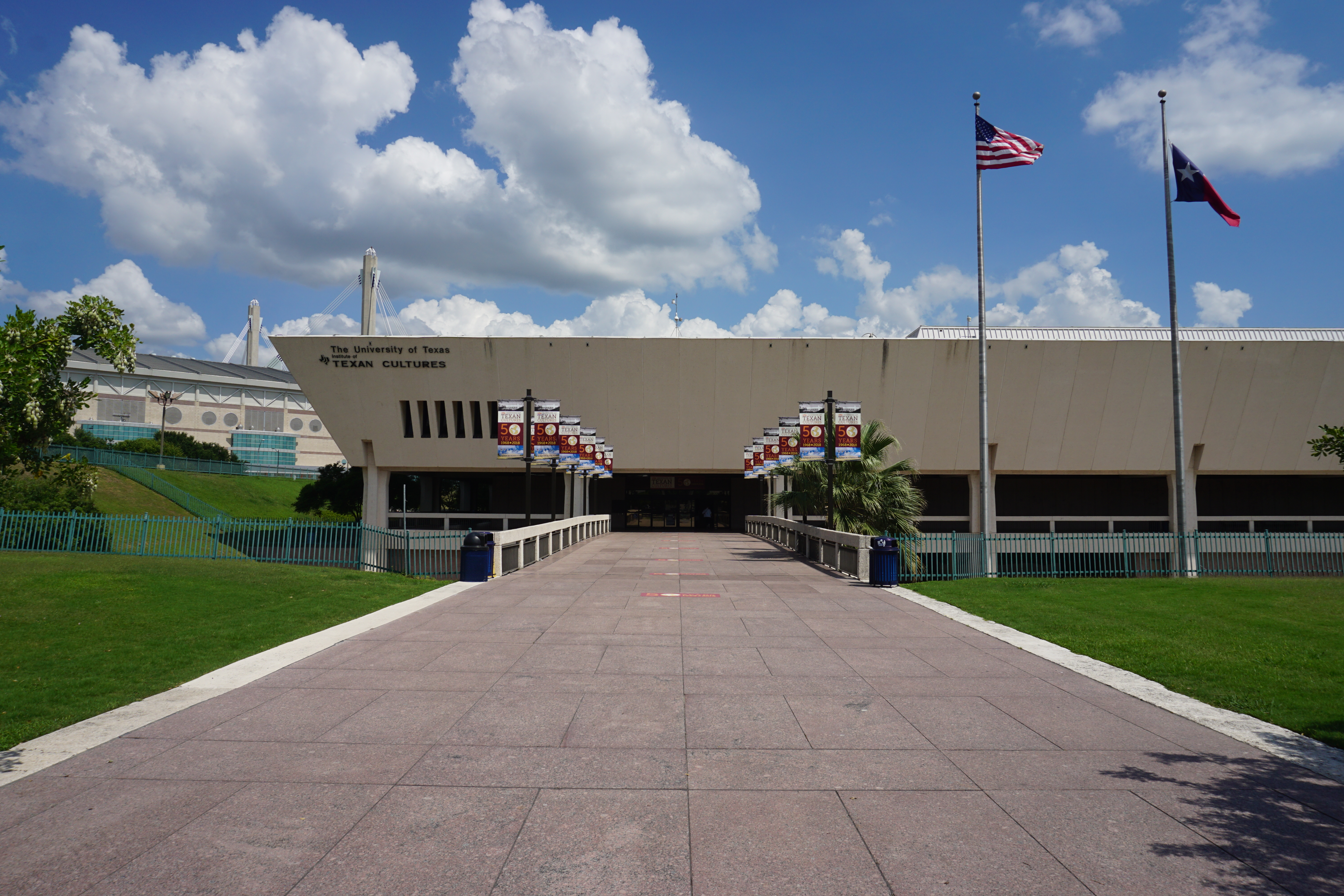
The former site of the Institute of Texan Cultures.

The Institute of Texan Cultures (ITC), previously housed at the Texas Pavilion, hosted the Texas Folklife Festival, an annual event celebrating the various cultures of Texas and their roles in the multicultural state. The ITC was originally built as a $10 million project for HemisFair '68, with the stated goal of promoting awareness of the history and ethnic diversity of Texas. The ITC was turned over to the University of Texas System after the conclusion of the World's Fair, being designated as a campus of UTSA in 1986. It served to further historical research, housing both UTSA's archives and historic photography collection with over 3 million images. In 2010, the ITC formalized an agreement with the Smithsonian Institution to obtain affiliate status. Funding for the ITC primarily came from legislative appropriations, event admissions fees, grants, and contributions. In late 2025, the building that formerly housed the ITC was demolished to make way for a multi-billion-dollar sports and entertainment complex tentatively named Project Marvel. The museum is currently operating out of the Frost Tower's 1st floor, reopening in January 2026.

=== Park West Campus ===
Located less than 2 miles west of the Main Campus, the 125-acre Park West Campus is currently home to the UTSA Roadrunners' soccer and track-and-field facilities. Park West is also designated as a host site for community sporting events. Construction of a new outpatient facility near the campus was completed in 2023.

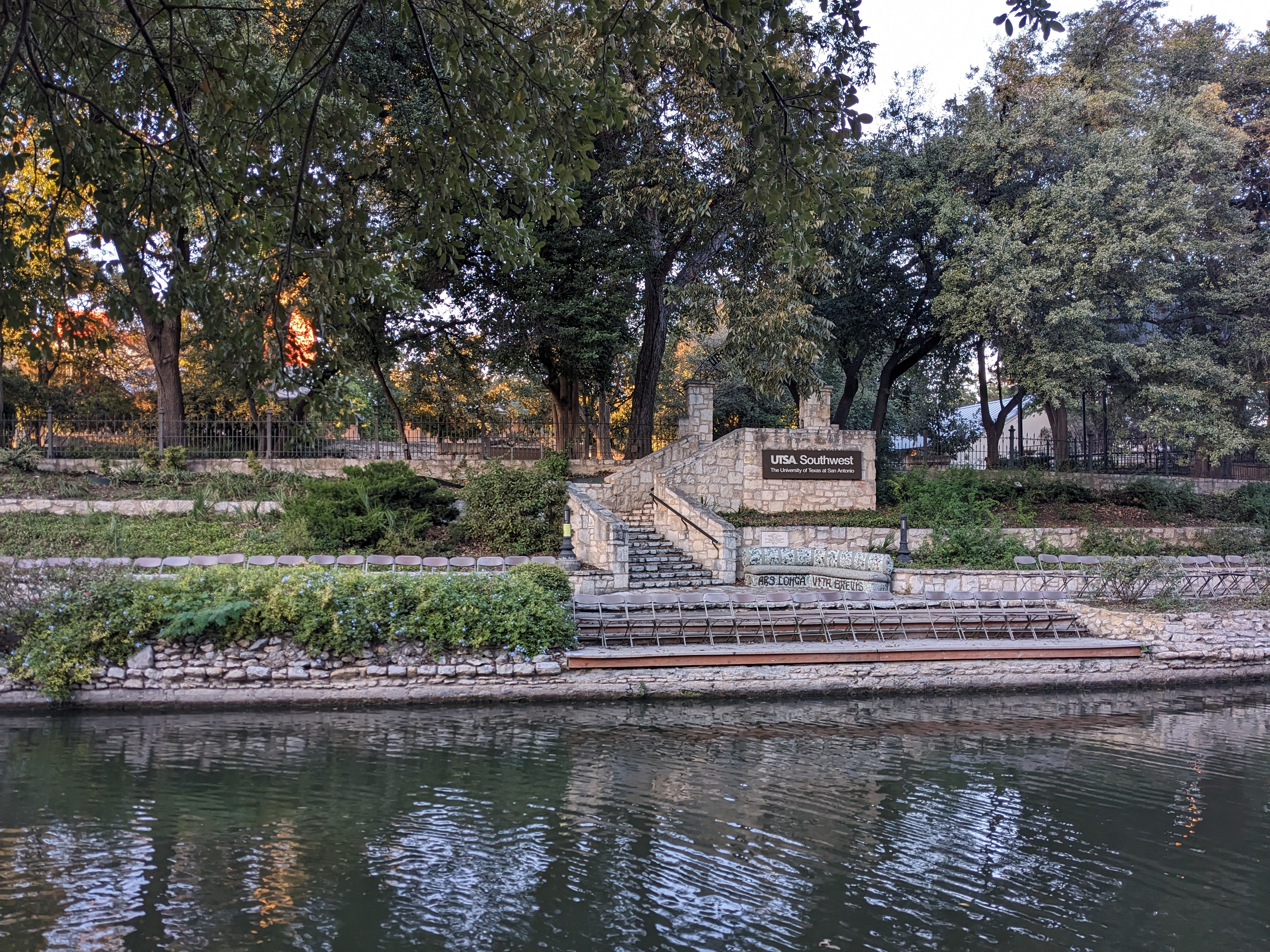
The Southwest Campus as viewed from the Riverwalk.

=== Southwest Campus ===
The Southwest Campus is located on the San Antonio River in downtown San Antonio. The buildings and campus were originally known as the Ursuline Convent and Academy, which opened in 1851. The campus gained its current name after the Southwest School of Art merged with the UTSA School of Art. The campus hosts both academic art classes and community art classes.

=== One Riverwalk Place ===
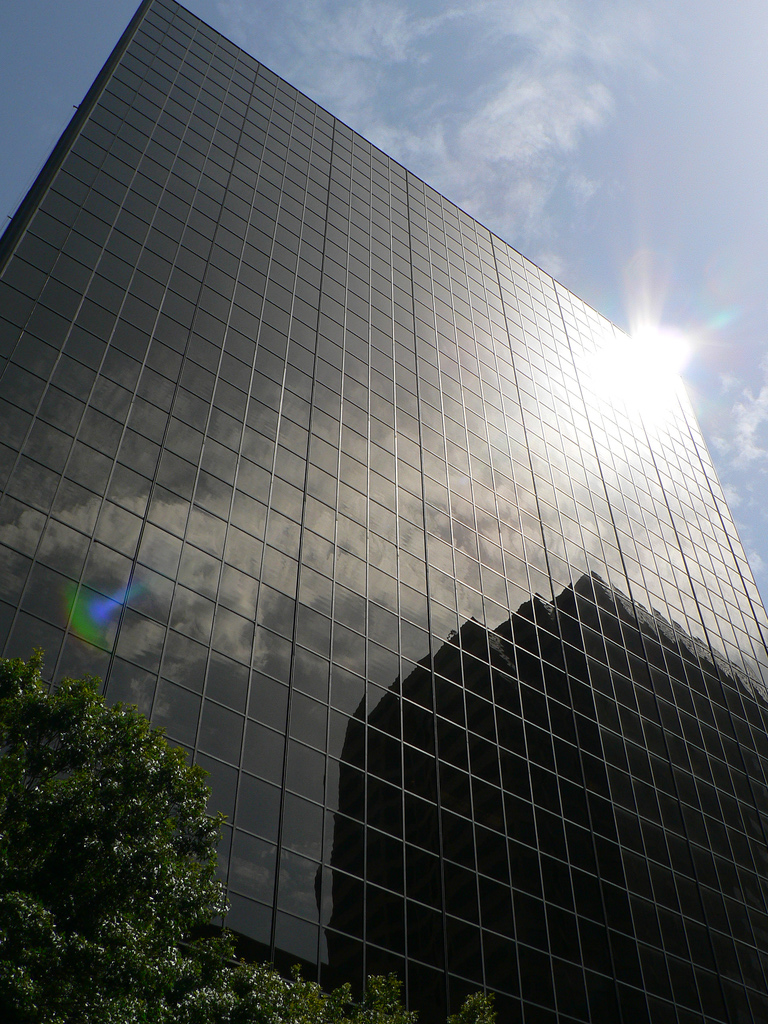
One Riverwalk Place houses the School of Architecture + Planning.

Purchased in March 2025, One Riverwalk Place is located at 700 N. St. Mary's St., adjacent to the Southwest Campus. It is home to the Klesse College of Engineering and Integrated Design's School of Architecture + Planning.

== Academics ==
Undergraduate admissions statistics
- 2023 entering class
- Admit rate: 88.5% (▲ +9.4)
- Yield rate: 29.5% (▼ −7.6)

Test scores middle 50%^{[i]}
- SAT Total: 1008–1200 (among 63% of FTFs)
- ACT Composite: 19–26 (among 8% of FTFs)

High school GPA^{[ii]}
- Top 10%: 17% (▼ −1)
- Top 25%: 55% (▼ −3)
- Top 50%: 87% (▼ −4)

The University of Texas at San Antonio is composed of 15 colleges and schools. Students and alumni at UTSA have been awarded fellowships such as the Ford Foundation Fellowship, the National Science Foundation's Research Fellowship, the Barry Goldwater Scholarship and Excellence in Education Foundation, and the Fulbright scholarship.

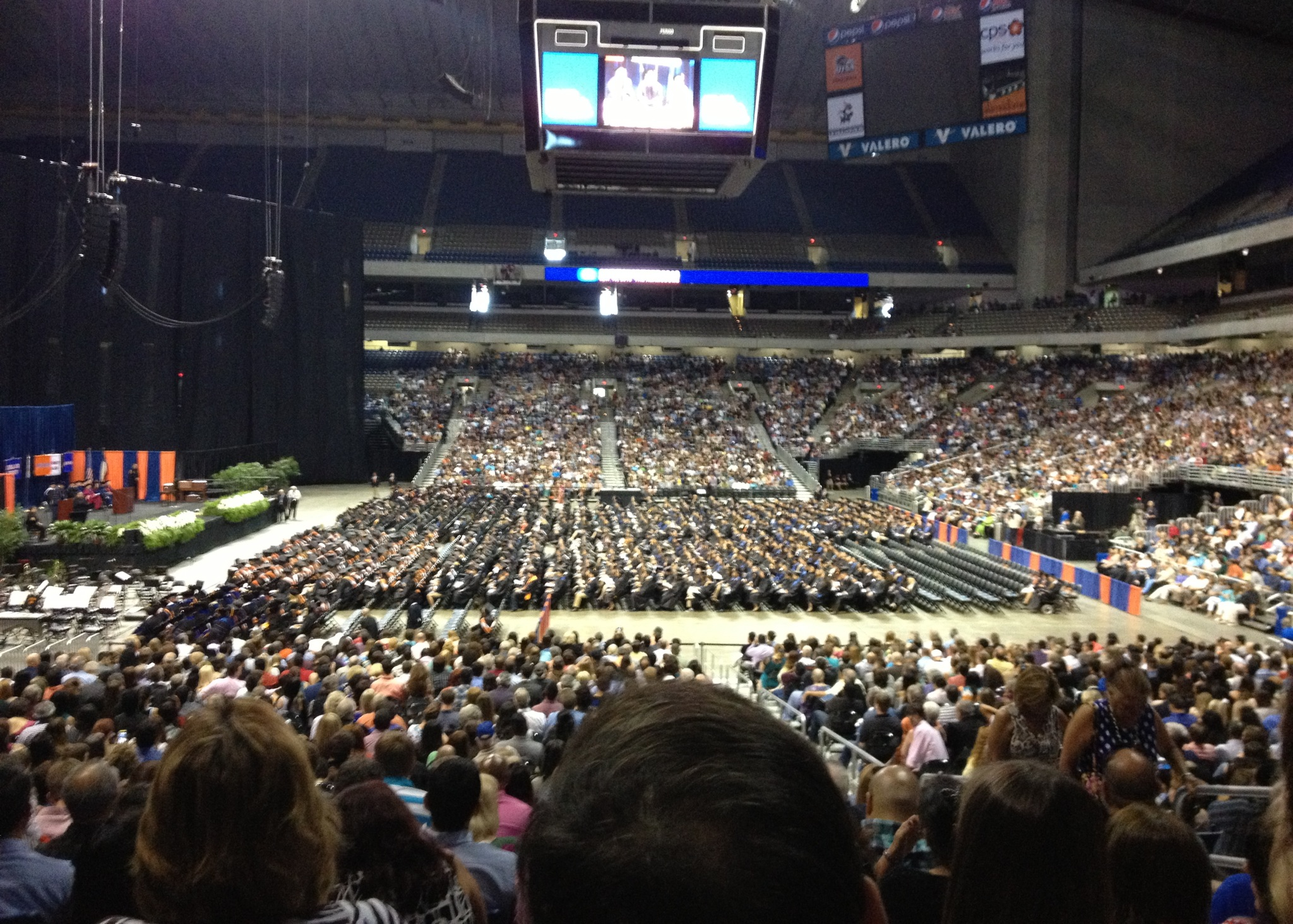
More than 40,000 attendees gathered in the Alamodome to watch the 2013 commencement.

The College of Sciences collaborates with other research institutions in San Antonio, such as the Southwest Research Institute, Texas Biomedical Research Institute, and UT Health-San Antonio. Since 2005, UTSA and the Southwest Research Institute have maintained a joint doctoral program focusing on space physics.

UTSA is the recipient of the CAE-Cyber Operations, CAE-Information Assurance Research (CAE-R), and CAE-Cyber Defense designations.

UTSA, which is designated as a Hispanic Serving Institution, became the recipient of Excelencia in Education's Seal of Excelencia in 2020.

John Peace Library at the UTSA main campus

The Human Health Initiative, launched by UTSA in November 2018, resulted in the College for Health, Community and Policy being established in 2019 as an innovative new college dedicated to advancing human health. The six-year undergraduate graduation rate of UTSA's Roadrunner cohort increased to 50.8% as of Fall 2019.

UTSA is designated an Innovation and Economic Prosperity (IEP) University by the Association of Public and Land-Grant Universities (APLU), a membership advocacy organization that fosters a community of university leaders working to advance the mission of public research universities.

=== Academic Colleges ===
- Carlos Alvarez College of Business
- College of AI, Cyber and Computing
- College of Education and Human Development
- Margie and Bill Klesse College of Engineering and Integrated Design
- College for Health, Community and Policy
- Honors College
- College of Liberal and Fine Arts
- College of Sciences
- University College

=== Health Science Center Schools ===
- School of Dentistry
- Long School of Medicine
- School of Nursing
- Graduate School of Biomedical Sciences
- School of Health Professions
- Kate Marmion School of Public Health

=== Rankings ===
Academic rankings

National
- Forbes: 272
- U.S. News & World Report: 213 (tie)
- Washington Monthly: 93
- WSJ/College Pulse: 297

Global
- ARWU: 601-700
- QS: 1001-1200
- THE: 601-800
- U.S. News & World Report: 625 (tie)

U.S. News & World Report Graduate Program Rankings (2025)
Biological Sciences	144 (tie)
Business	Unranked
Chemistry	119 (tie)
Computer Science	120 (tie)
Education	114 (tie)
Engineering	136 (tie)
English	131 (tie)
Fine Arts	135 (tie)
Mathematics	173 (tie)
Physics	167 (tie)
Psychology	165 (tie)
Public Affairs	144 (tie)
Social Work	77 (tie)
Statistics	79 (tie)

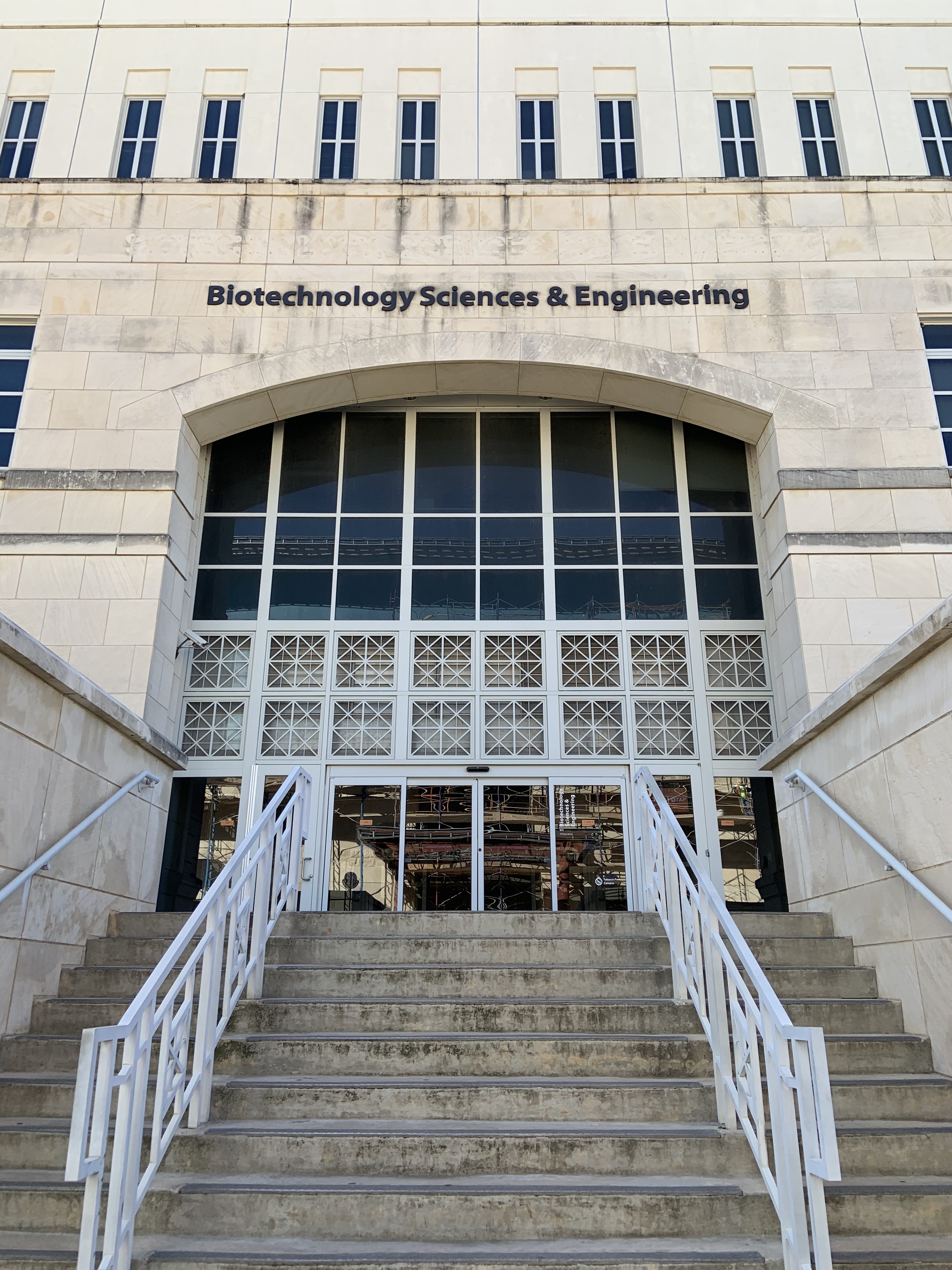
UTSA Biotechnology and Engineering Building

According to U.S. News & World Report's 2026 rankings, UTSA was tied for 213th among national universities, tied for 118th among U.S. public schools, tied for 42nd in the nation as a Top Performer on Social Mobility, and tied for 56th among Most Innovative Schools.

In the 2020 Global M.B.A. Rankings by CEO Magazine, The College of Business' Executive M.B.A. program at UTSA was ranked 8th globally. In addition, UTSA's M.B.A. program was ranked as a Tier One Global M.B.A. program.

=== Research ===
The University of Texas at San Antonio is classified among "R1: Doctoral Universities – Very High Research Activity" and as a "Texas Tier One" institution. UTSA had $141.7 million in total research expenditures, with $70.55 million in restricted research expenditures for FY22. UTSA students and faculty conduct research in cross-disciplinary fields of study, which include Advanced Materials, Cloud Computing, Cyber Security and Data Analytics, Integrative Biomedicine, Social and Educational Transformation, and Sustainable Communities and Critical Infrastructure. UTSA is home to 33 research centers and institutes and is a member of the National Academies' Government-University-Industry Research Roundtable (GUIRR).

A 2007 study released by Academic Analytics showed that UTSA was ranked fifth among large research universities in the state of Texas for faculty scholarly productivity. The Office of the Vice President for Research publishes Discovery, an annual magazine dedicated to highlighting the research, academic, and creative achievements of the UTSA community. First printed in 2007, the publication is a member of the University Research Magazine Association, an organization that promotes excellence among the scholarly publications of universities.

The University of Texas at San Antonio is home to the Curtis Vaughan Jr. Observatory and is a member of the Association of Universities for Research in Astronomy (AURA), a consortium of US institutions and international affiliates that operates world-class astronomical observatories on behalf of NASA and NSF.

The UTSA Center for Advanced Measurements in Extreme Environments (CAMEE) collaborates with NASA to push the boundaries of current measurement and modeling technology by conducting research in harsh and extreme environments. CAMEE also studies the challenging conditions produced when traveling at hypersonic speeds.

The U.S. Department of Energy selected UTSA to lead the Cybersecurity Manufacturing Innovation Institute (CyManII). The National Security Collaboration Center (NSCC) at UTSA is the home base for CyManII.

UTSA operated the Center for Archaeological Research, which in 1984 conducted a study of the former Hot Wells hotel, spa, and bathhouse on the San Antonio River in the southside of San Antonio. The survey determined that all that remained of the resort were remnants of the 1902 hotel building, bathhouse ruins, and stones of a small nearby building. In 2015, work was authorized by the Bexar County Commissioners Court to begin restoring Hot Wells.

=== Programs ===
==== FAME ====
In 2013, the University of Texas at San Antonio established Facilitated Acceptance to Medical Education (FAME), an accelerated medical program for highly qualified high school seniors. Students in the program, after completing a three-year undergraduate education at UTSA, matriculate to UT Health-San Antonio.

==== Bold Promise ====
In December 2019, UTSA established the Bold Promise program, which offers qualified incoming freshmen who come from middle and low-income Texan families to have 100% of tuition and fees paid for eight fall/spring semesters taken within a 4-year time period. Costs are covered by scholarships, grants, or tuition exemptions from federal, state, or institutional funds.

==== UTSA Top Scholar ====
Launched in fall 2013, the UTSA Top Scholar program is a premier scholar program combining a comprehensive, four-year, merit-based scholarship with personalized experiences in academics, leadership and service, including a global opportunity, for high-achieving students.

==== Dual degree in artificial intelligence and medicine ====
Undertaking the first dual degree in the United States to combine medicine and artificial intelligence, medical students spend four years at the UT Health SA Long School of Medicine and one year at UTSA, earning both a doctor of medicine degree and a master's of science degree in artificial intelligence.

== Student life ==
Undergraduate demographics as of Fall 2023
Race and ethnicity	Total
Hispanic	61%
White	19%
Black	8%
Asian	6%
Two or more races	3%
International student	1%
Unknown	1%
Economic diversity
Low-income (Note: The percentage of students who received an income-based federal Pell grant intended for low-income students.)	43%
Affluent (Note: The percentage of students who are a part of the American middle class at the bare minimum.)	57%

There are 350 student organizations on campus. Some organizations receive funding from the University Student Services fee. These sponsored student organizations are the only Registered Student Organizations (RSOs) that may use "UTSA" in their name.

Beaks Up Speak Up is an organization supported by the UTSA Office of Student Activities that educates the student body on issues related to being an active bystander. The organization facilitates a culture of care for all members of the UTSA community to recognize potential harm, choose to respond, and act in a way that positively influences a beneficial outcome for other people. The group facilitates workshops on a variety of topics that impact the physical, mental, and emotional well-being of others, and assists campus partners with resources that would aid in successfully reducing risk, and teaches marketable skills to students.

The Campus Activities Board (CAB) is the largest student program board on campus. It fosters traditions and community at the university by coordinating large-scale events such as Best Fest, Fiesta UTSA, and various homecoming functions.

The College Democrats and College Republicans at UTSA both date back to the late 1970s. The two organizations have brought notable public officials to campus, such as Bill White, Congressman Joaquin Castro, Congressman Pete Gallego, Judge Juanita Vasquez-Gardener, State Senator Joe J. Bernal, Councilman John Clamp, and Senator Bob Krueger.

=== Residential life ===
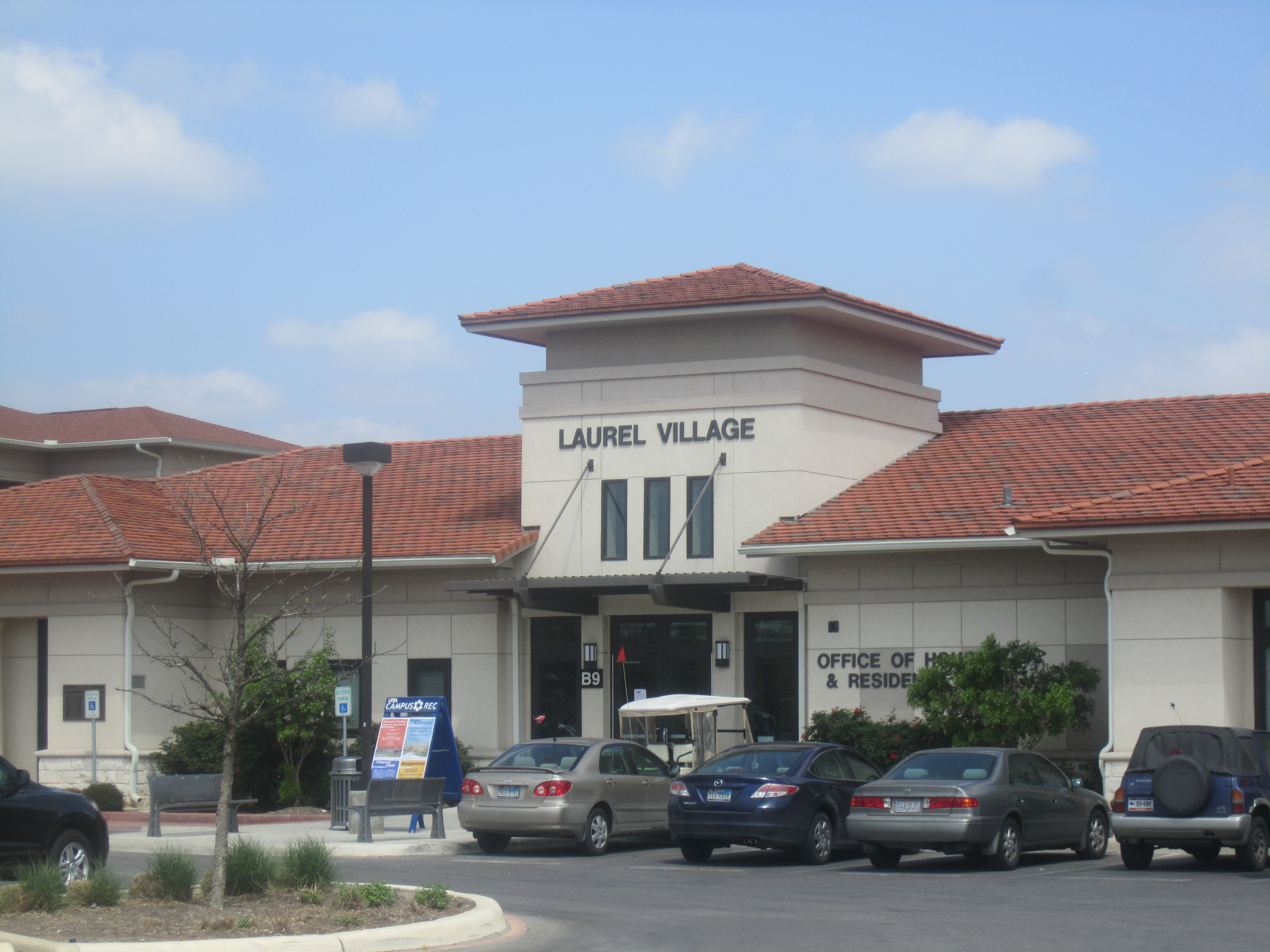
Laurel Village housing office, built alongside the Laurel Village complex, which opened in 2007.

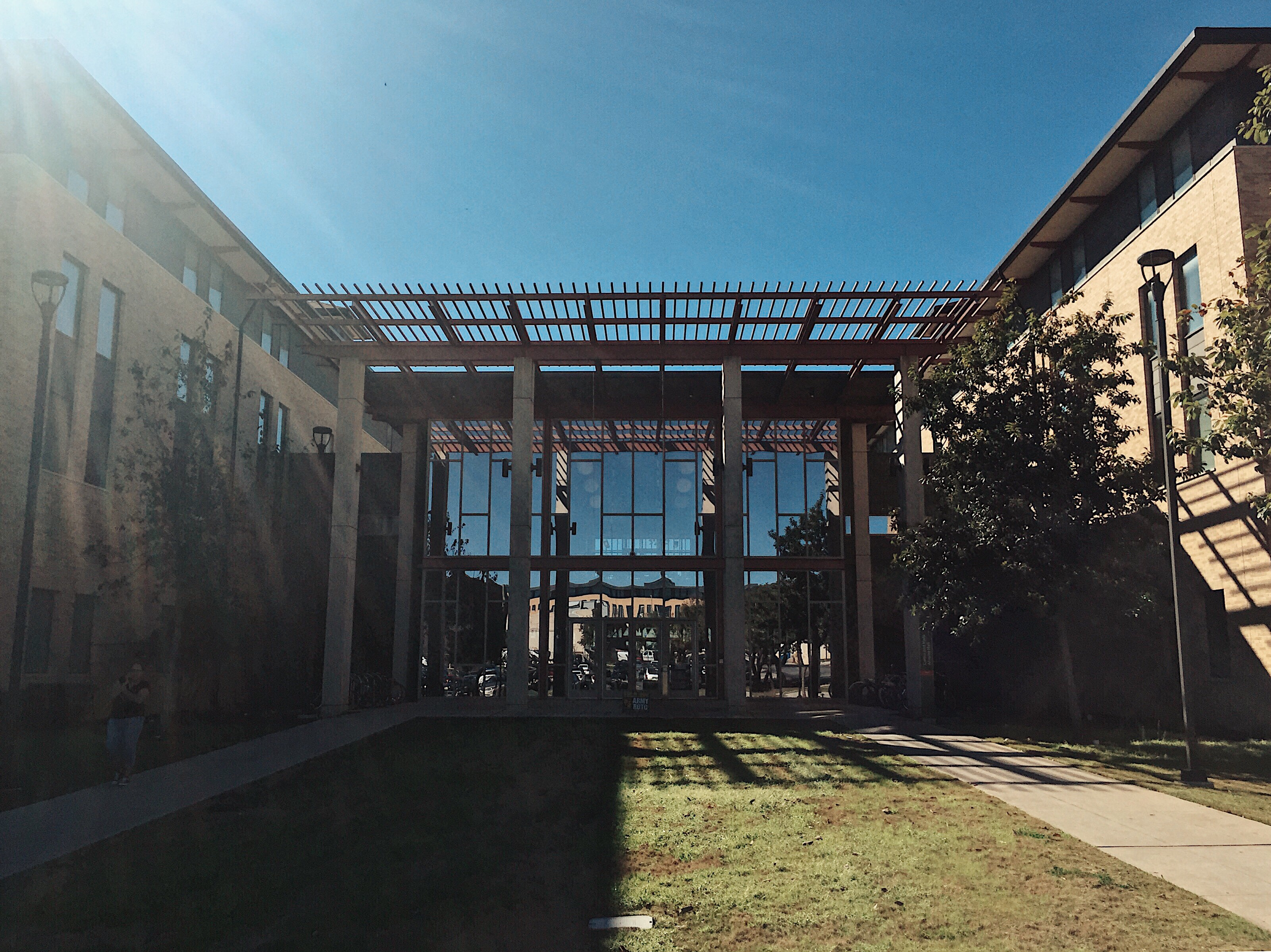
Alvarez Hall, originally named San Saba Hall on the Main Campus.

UTSA offers several options for on-campus housing:

- Alvarez Hall: A four-story residence hall and the second residence hall on campus, opened in the fall of 2013, with room for over 600 students in its two wings. It is situated next to Chaparral Village, the Rec Fields, and the Convocation Center. Students are organized into "special interest communities", including the Engineering, Honors, Leadership and Service, First Gen Familia and Medical Humanities communities. Laundry facilities are in each wing. A community kitchen and computer lab are on the second floor lobby.
- Blanco Hall: Opened in December 2025, this is the university's fourth and newest residence hall, serving primarily first and second year students. Blanco accommodates 594 students in a mix of single and double-bed units. It is located at the intersection of Barshop Boulevard and Tobin Avenue, next to Chisholm Hall and Chaparral Village.
- Chaparral Village ("Chap"): Second apartment-style housing complex on campus, opened in 2004. Located right next to the Roadrunner Cafe. Features furnished living rooms and a kitchenette. Suites are available in 2 or 4-bedroom configurations, housing 1,000 students in total. Amenities include an outdoor swimming pool, and a basketball court. Four Neighborhood Centers provide student residents with community kitchens, laundry, and dishwashing facilities. All housing residents are also able to use the pool, hot tub, and outdoor picnic areas with key card access.
- Chisholm Hall ("Chis"): The oldest dormitory on campus, opened in 1986; a four-story dormitory for approximately 500 student residents. It offers rooms in 1 and 2-person configurations, with an activity center, study lounges, and a community kitchen.
- Guadalupe Hall ("Guad"): The third residence hall, which opened its doors in the fall semester of 2021. It is designed for first-year Honors College students; in addition to dormitory rooms, community kitchens, and laundry facilities, the building also offers multipurpose spaces for study groups and collaborative learning.
- Laurel Village: UTSA's third apartment-stylehousing complex, completed in 2008, houses 678 students. Very similar in design to Chaparral Village, and is the only housing option at UTSA to allow alcohol, provided all residents in the suite are 21 or older. Two Neighborhood Centers provide residents with community kitchens, laundry and dishwashing facilities. Laurel offers a full-year leasing option for those in search of year-round housing.
- University Oaks ("U Oaks" or simply "the Oaks"): Apartments with 1, 2, and 4-bedroom configurations; first apartment housing complex on campus, paid via lease with Campus Living Villages. University Oaks houses approximately 1,400 students in total.
- The Continental: The university's first downtown living option, across the street from San Pedro I and II, and within a short walk to the Downtown Campus. Houses 50 students in recently renovated, fully furnished apartment-style suites with in-unit washer and dryers inside the historic Continental Hotel.

=== Greek life ===
Greek life at UTSA is directed by four governing bodies: the Panhellenic Council (6 chapters), the Interfraternity Council (11 chapters), the National Pan-Hellenic Council (7 chapters), and the Multicultural Greek Council (7 chapters). Greek life was first established in 1977.

=== ROTC programs ===
UTSA has one of the most extensive Air Force Reserve Officers' Training Corps (AFROTC) programs in the United States; its program is the nation's seventh largest such program. In 2009, the school's Air Force ROTC detachment won the Right of Line Award, the most prestigious award among all Air Force ROTC units, ranking first in the Southwest Region out of 36 detachments for producing the most second lieutenants in the Air Force. At the national level (among 144 detachments), UTSA was ranked second behind Purdue University. UTSA also has a large Air Force ROTC program among Hispanic-serving institutions . In 2009, the AFROTC unit was awarded 36 slots for field training compared to Texas A&M University, which had 32.

=== Student Government ===
The Student Government Association (SGA), originally founded as the Student Representative Assembly (SRA), was established in 1976. In October 1976, the UTSA student body voted to accept a constitution establishing the Student Representative Assembly. The constitution was drafted by a student committee and approved by the Board of Regents of the University of Texas System. The organization's name was changed to the Student Government Association in the second Constitution, in 1993.

The SGA is the official voice of the university's student body. Its officers and committees reflect those of the United States federal government, using a three-branch system. Student Government hosts the University Life Awards, a celebration in the ballroom that recognizes excellence in leadership throughout the campus. All students are considered members of the SGA, due to both the fact that its activities are subsidized through the Student Services Fee and that it represents the views of the entire student body.

The SGA is credited with facilitating voting for a university mascot in 1977, advocating for building a university center in 1979, sponsoring the first Fiesta UTSA in 1980, distributing the University Life Awards to recognize outstanding efforts of students, faculty, and staff, expanding dining hours, advocating for the installation of the Roadrunner statue, and renovating the Sombrilla fountain.

=== The Paisano ===
The Paisano is the student-run newspaper of the university. It has remained fully independent since its inception in 1981 and has received numerous awards from the Columbia Scholastic Press Association, including a gold medal in 2000. The Paisano is the oldest independent collegiate student newspaper in Texas and one of only approximately a dozen independent student newspapers in the nation.

== Traditions ==
The official colors of UTSA are blue and orange. The colors of the University of Texas System have historically been orange and white. Blue was selected upon the recommendation of the Student Representative Assembly in accordance with the Board of Regents' Rules and Regulations, which states "an institution may adopt one additional color to be used in connection with athletic and other activities of the institution".

The greater roadrunner, a bird representative of the Texas Hill Country and the American Southwest, was voted the UTSA mascot in 1977. "Rowdy the Roadrunner" attends many university functions and games. On March 1, 2008, UTSA Athletics unveiled its new logos during the Homecoming Game against Texas A&M University–Corpus Christi. The athletic markings were changed to further differentiate it from other bird mascots, such as the University of Kansas Jayhawk.

=== Class ring ===
The night before class ring ceremonies, the UTSA rings are placed within the Alamo overnight, a tradition that began in 2012 as part of the university's efforts to build upon longstanding traditions.

=== Best Fest and Fiesta UTSA ===
Fiesta UTSA, an annual event held in April, began in 1978. The first Fiesta UTSA was attended by over 1,000 students and included music, a jalapeño eating contest, a watermelon seed spitting contest, a dunk tank, and other activities. Fiesta UTSA includes booths set up under the Sombrilla in a carnival atmosphere and run by Registered Student Organizations. Fiesta UTSA became the kickoff event for Fiesta San Antonio each spring, having been added to the official Fiesta San Antonio schedule in 1980. Fiesta UTSA was renamed by students in 2022 and is now known as Día en la Sombrilla.

Best Fest, an annual celebration held in October, began in 1978 (as "Bestfest") as "a special salute to five of the state's outstanding festivals": New Braunfels's Wurstfest, Corpus Christi's Buccaneer Days, San Antonio's Fiesta, the Texas State Fair in Dallas, and George Washington's Birthday Celebration in Laredo. It was presented by the student organization Variety 79. In 1979, the event was said to be "a salute to five of the city's outstanding festivals: Fiesta Navidena, King William Fair, La Feria del Rio, the San Antonio Stock Show and Rodeo, and the Texas Folklife Festival."

=== Birds Up hand sign ===
The origins of the Birds Up hand sign date back to 1979 during Wurstfest in New Braunfels, Texas. The gesture is made by making a fist with the palm facing away from the body, then extending the pinky finger and thumb. The thumb represents the head of the roadrunner, while the pinky finger represents the tail.

=== Homecoming ===
Homecoming has many traditions at UTSA. One of the most notable is the annual Golf Cart Parade. Student organizations design and create decorated golf carts according to the year's homecoming theme. Each submission is constructed by students at the Golf Cart Decorating Party, an event held a few days before. The parade has been an official part of the university's homecoming ceremonies since 1993. In 2004, it was combined into the Rowdy Rampage Fireworks Spectacular, alongside the spirit rally and a live music concert.

=== University Life Awards ===
The University Life Awards (also known as the "ULAs") is an award ceremony sponsored by the Student Government Association to recognize outstanding leadership on campus. It recognizes students, student organizations, faculty, and staff who have made an exceptional difference in the UTSA community. It is touted as the university's oldest tradition. Awards include Most Outstanding Student (by colleges and classification), Greek Man and Woman of the Year, the Jane Findling Award, and the Golden Feather Award.

== Athletics ==
UTSA is San Antonio's only NCAA Division I Football Bowl Subdivision institution and is currently a member of the American Athletic Conference (AAC). The Roadrunners compete in 17 intercollegiate sports, including baseball, men's and women's basketball, men's and women's cross country, football, men's and women's golf, women's soccer, softball, men's and women's tennis, men's and women's indoor and outdoor track and field, and women's volleyball. The university has hosted 17 NCAA Division I championships since 1997, including four men's Final Fours, two women's Final Fours, and a pair of women's Volleyball Championships. UTSA has captured more than 70 conference championships, appeared in more than 50 NCAA postseason appearances, and has garnered two NCA national championships. Basketball and volleyball games are hosted at the Convocation Center. The Park West Athletics Complex opened in 2013 as the home of the soccer and track & field programs. The baseball, softball, and tennis teams all play at on-campus facilities.

UTSA maintains a rivalry with Texas State University in a series known as the I-35 Rivalry. Separated by about 50 miles (~80 km), both schools have been conference rivals since 1991, first in the Southland Conference and then in the Western Athletic Conference (WAC). UTSA and Texas State are now in different conferences, with UTSA in the American Athletic Conference (AAC) and Texas State in the Sun Belt Conference. The leadership of both universities has stated its interest in preserving the football rivalry, even as the institutions are in different conferences.

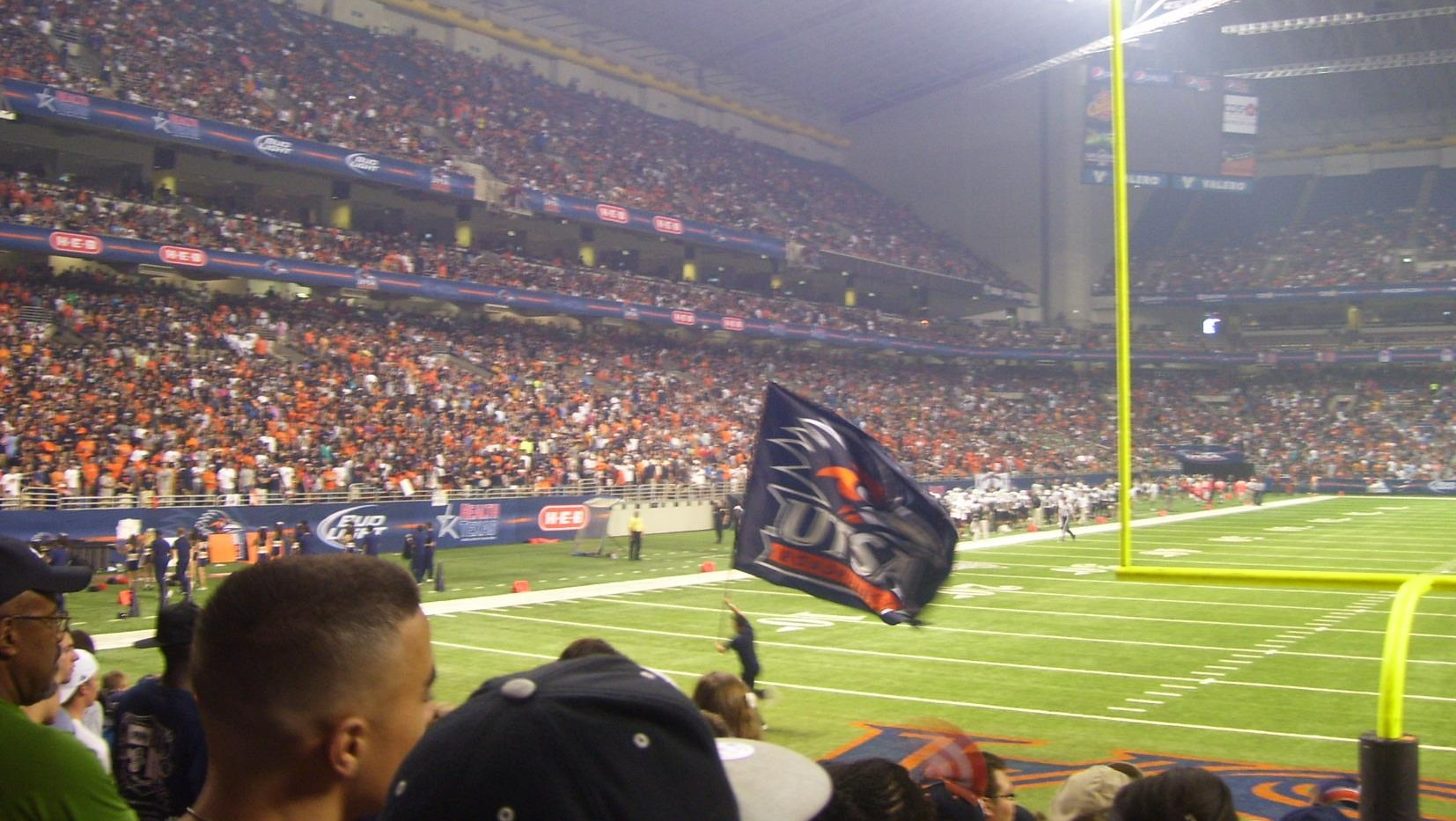
56,743 fans at the Alamodome for UTSA's first game

In 2019, after working with Brenda Tracy, UTSA became the first university in the U.S. to implement the Tracy Rule, a zero-tolerance policy against sexual assault.

=== Football ===
The football team plays its home games at the Alamodome in Downtown San Antonio. The university won its first football game against Northeastern State University on September 3, 2011, in front of a record start-up attendance of 56,743. The Roadrunners also broke the attendance record for an inaugural season, averaging 35,521 per game. UTSA led the WAC in attendance for the 2012 season. The Roadrunners now compete in the American Conference after previously being a part of Conference USA.

== Notable alumni ==
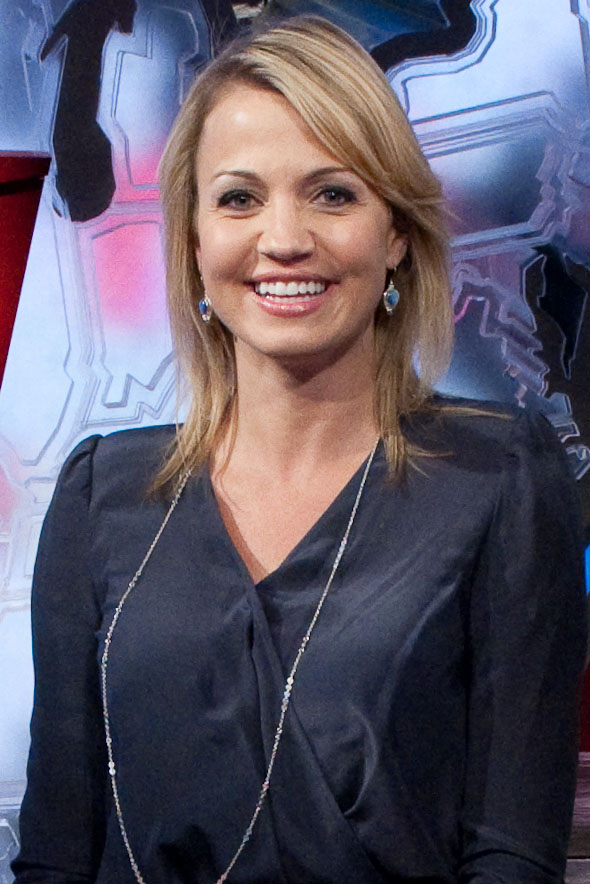
Sports broadcaster Michelle Beadle

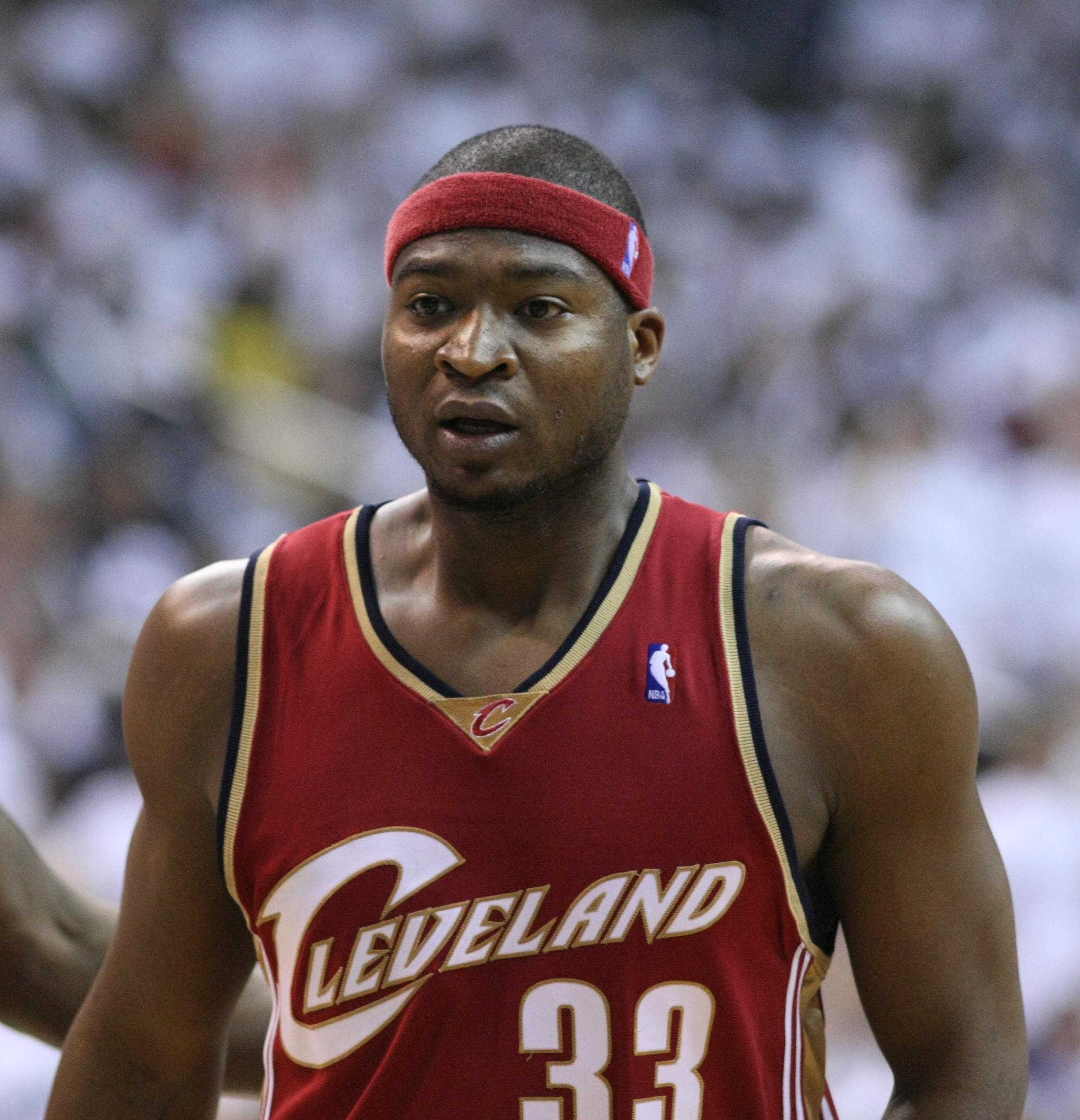
NBA Player and 2005 Champion with the San Antonio Spurs Devin Brown

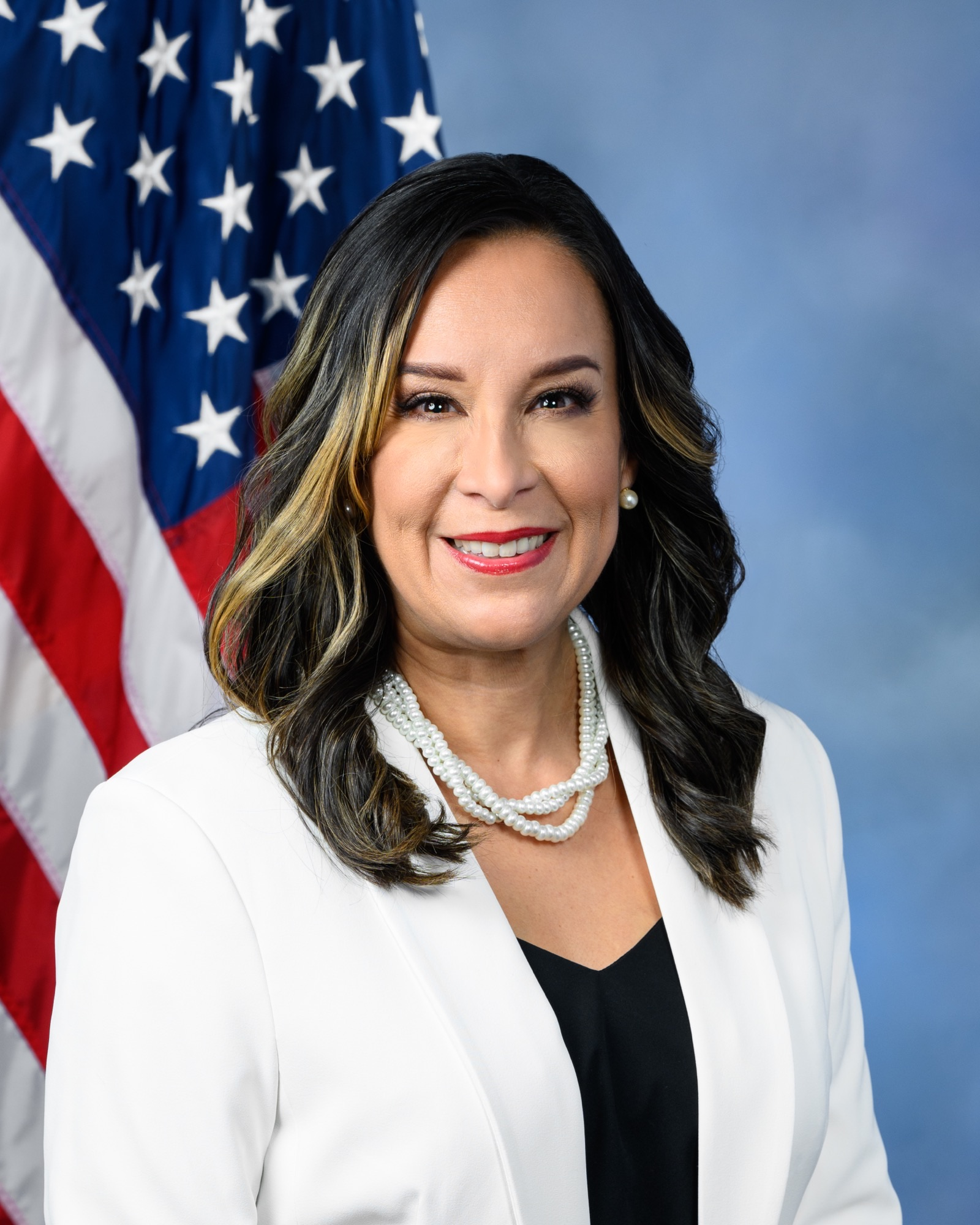
Member of the U.S. House of Representatives and the first Republican to represent Texas's 15th congressional district Monica De La Cruz

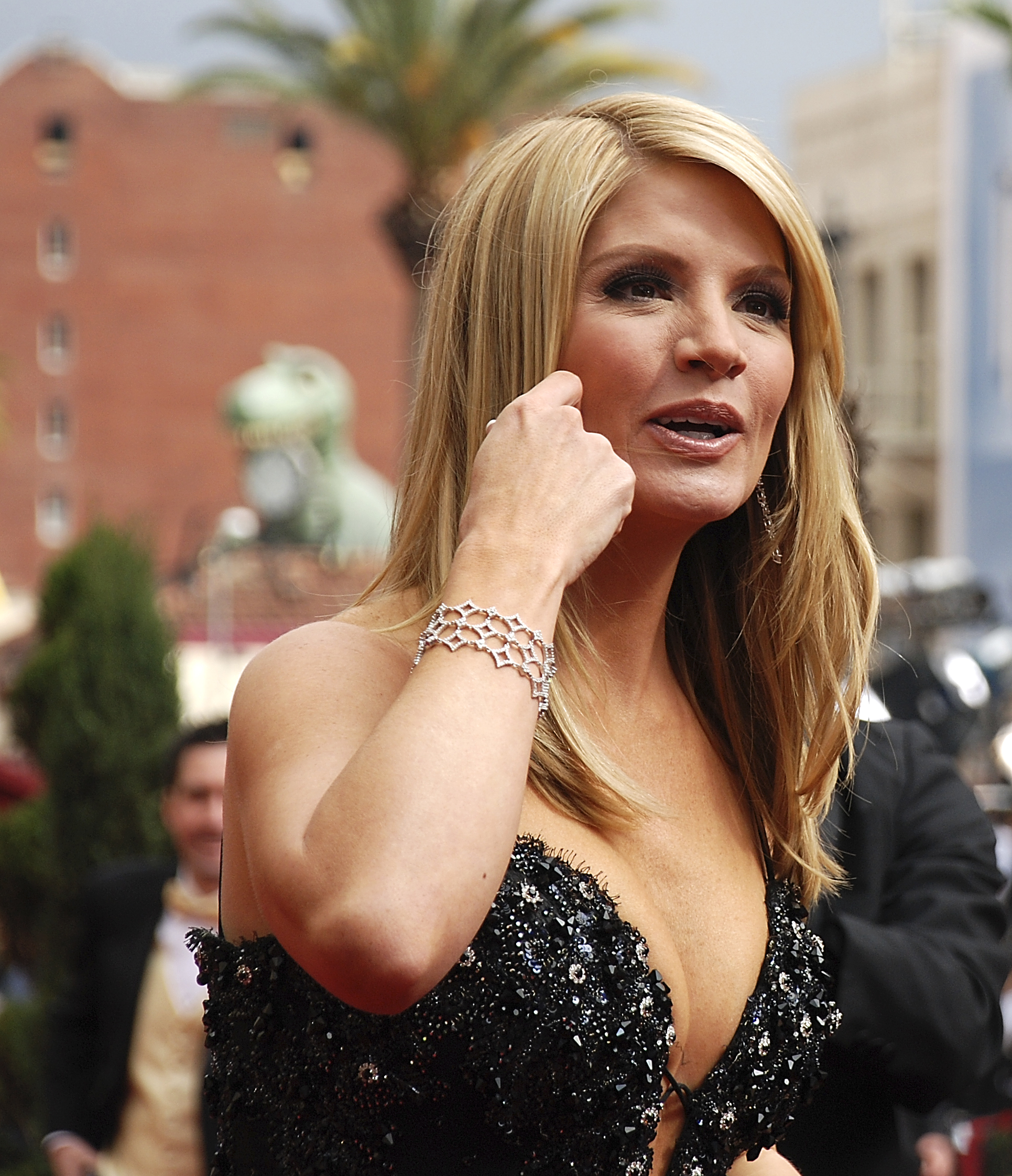
American actress, journalist/news anchor and former co-host of Extra Dayna Devon

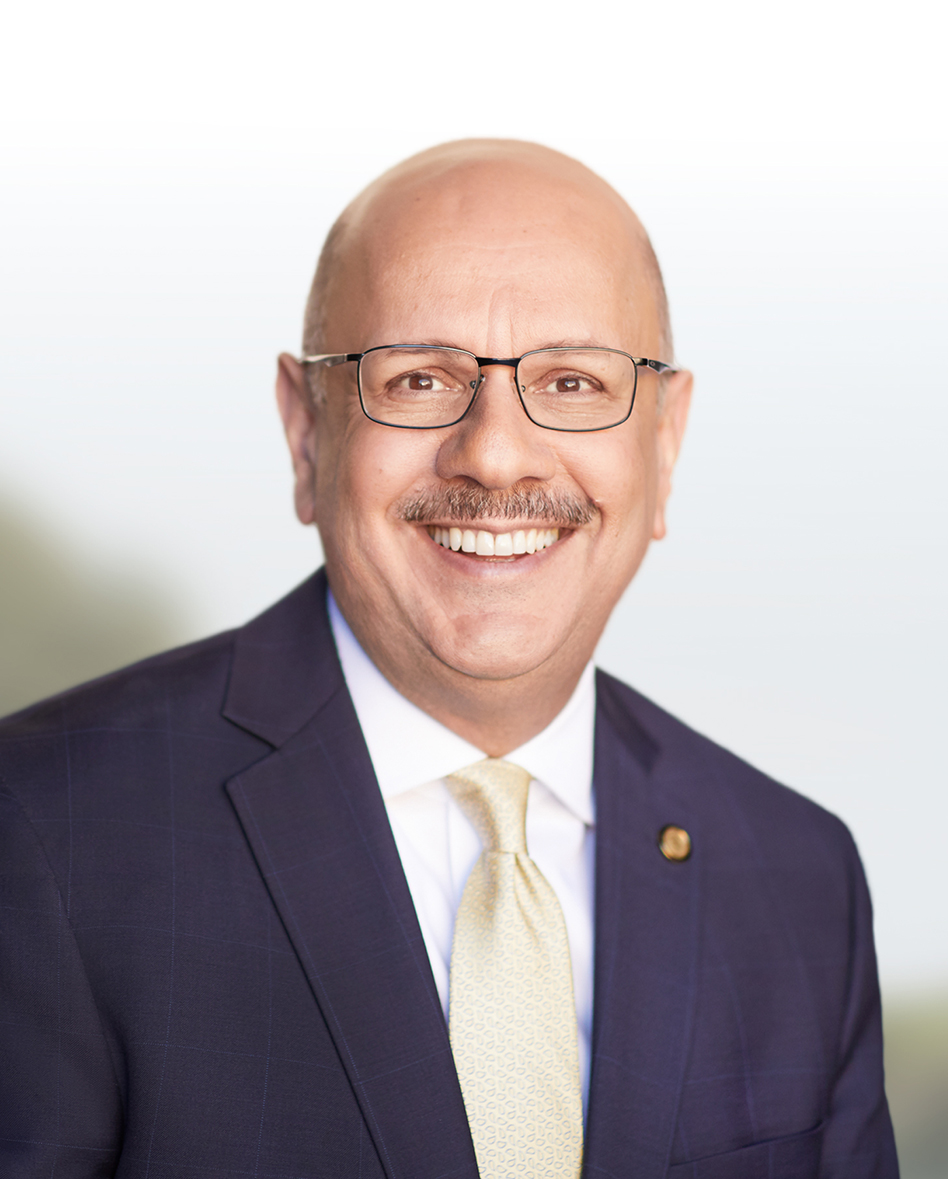
10th President of Carnegie Mellon University Farnam Jahanian

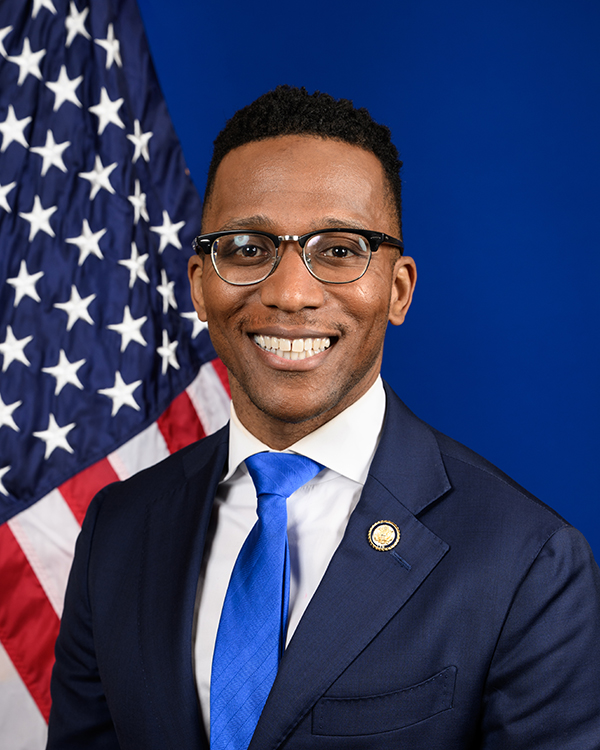
Member of the U.S. House of Representatives and the first African-American Harris County Attorney Christian Menefee

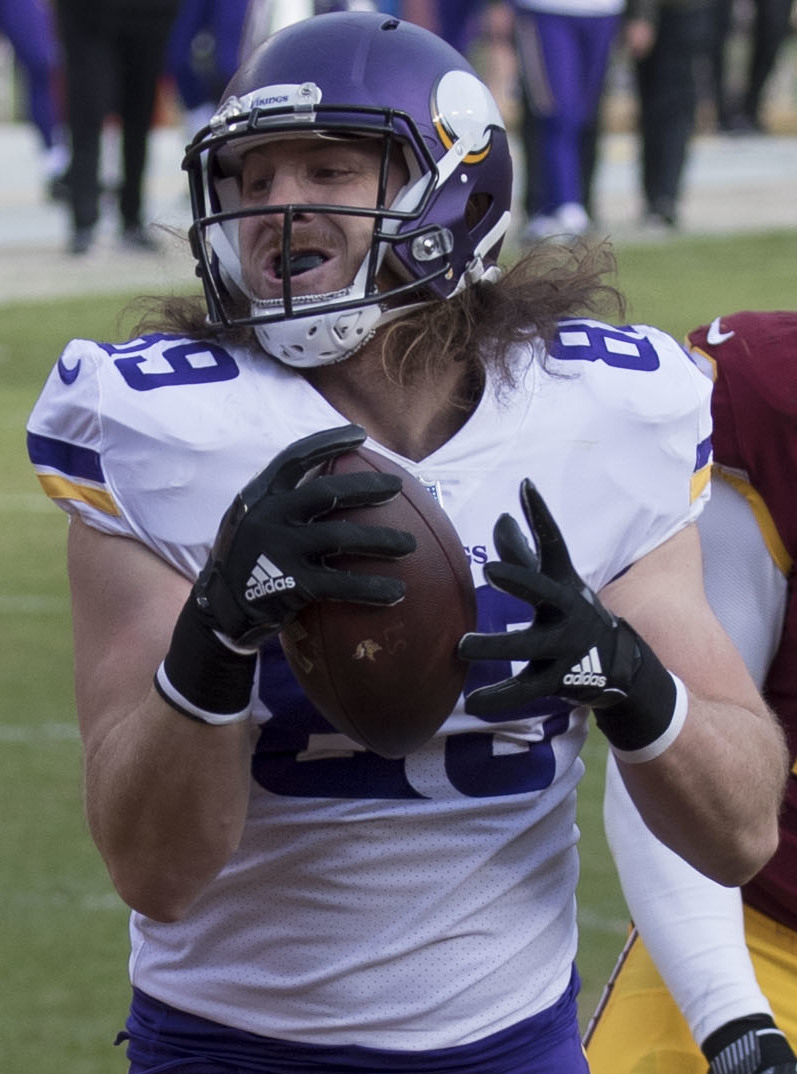
NFL Tight End David Morgan II and UTSA's first NFL Draft Pick in program's history

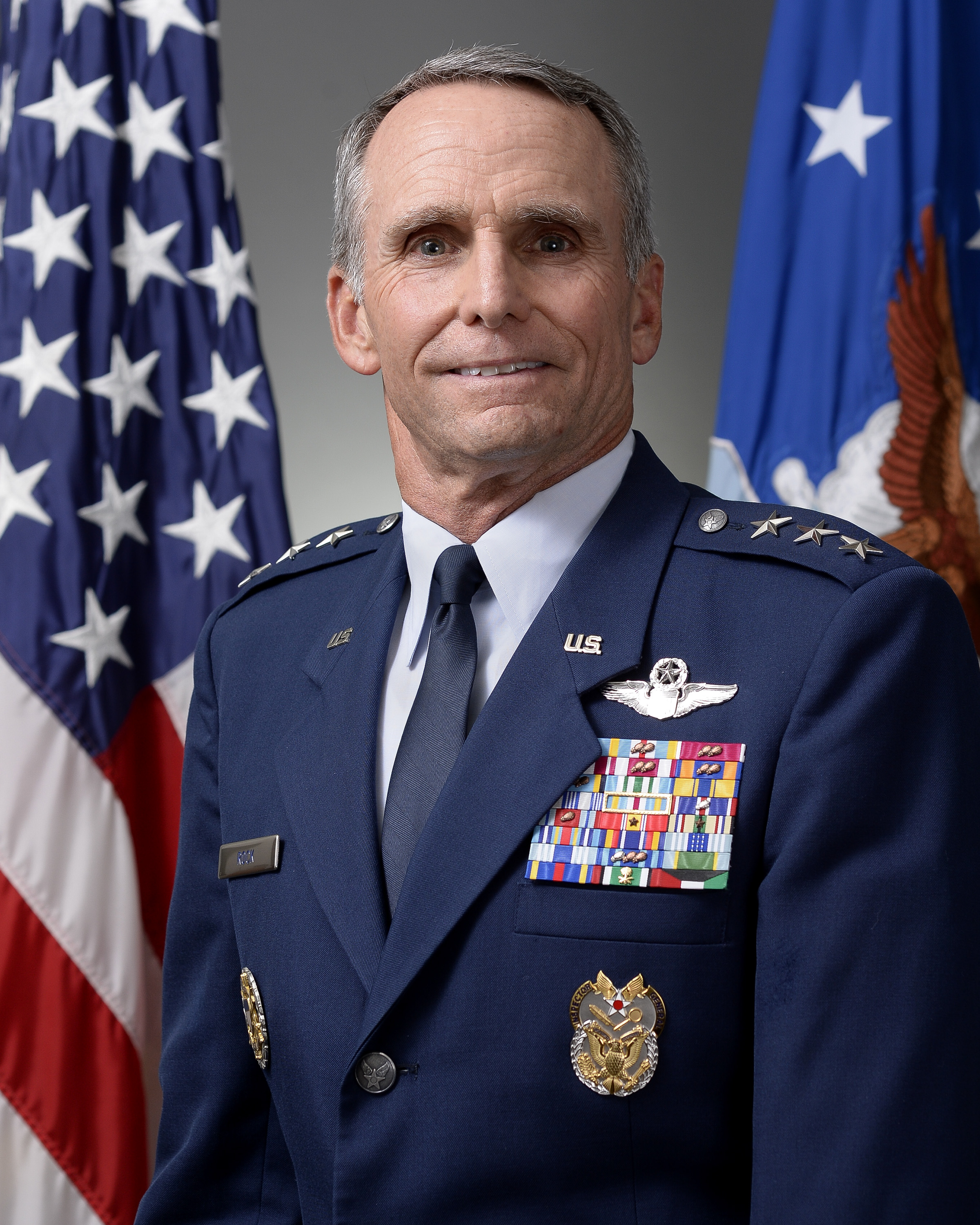
Lt General of the U.S. Air Force Anthony J. Rock

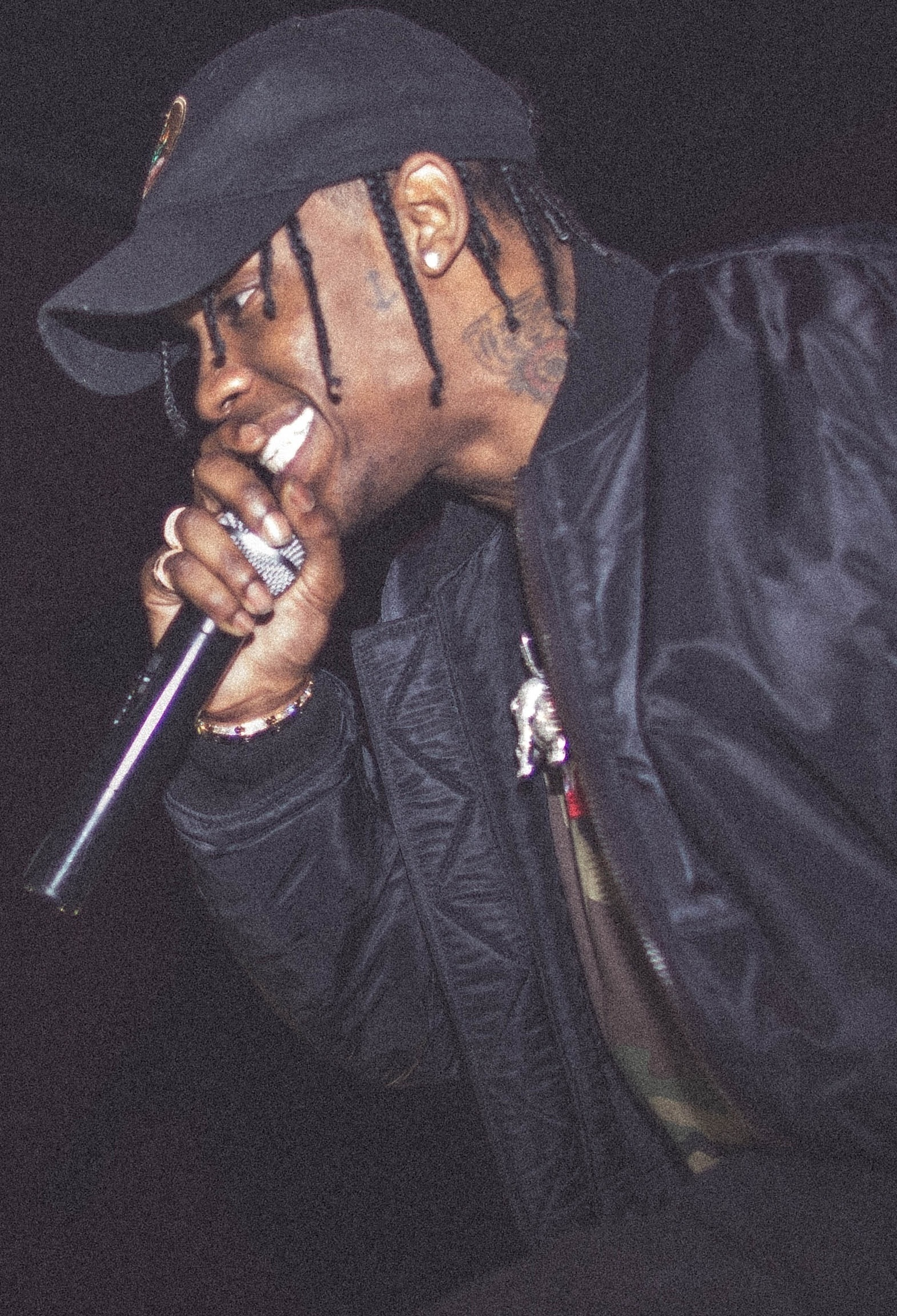
8 time Grammy Award nominee and Billboard Music Award and a Latin Grammy Award recipient Travis Scott

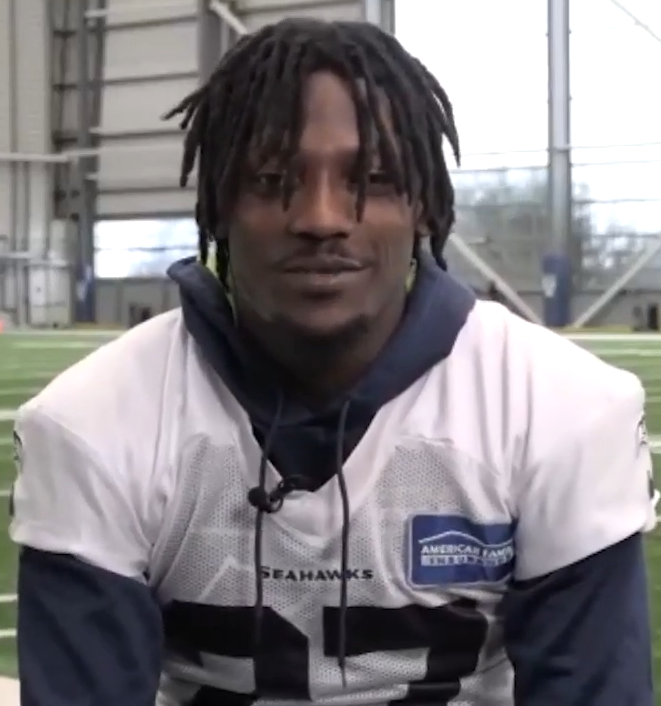
NFL Super Bowl Champion, Pro Bowler Riq Woolen

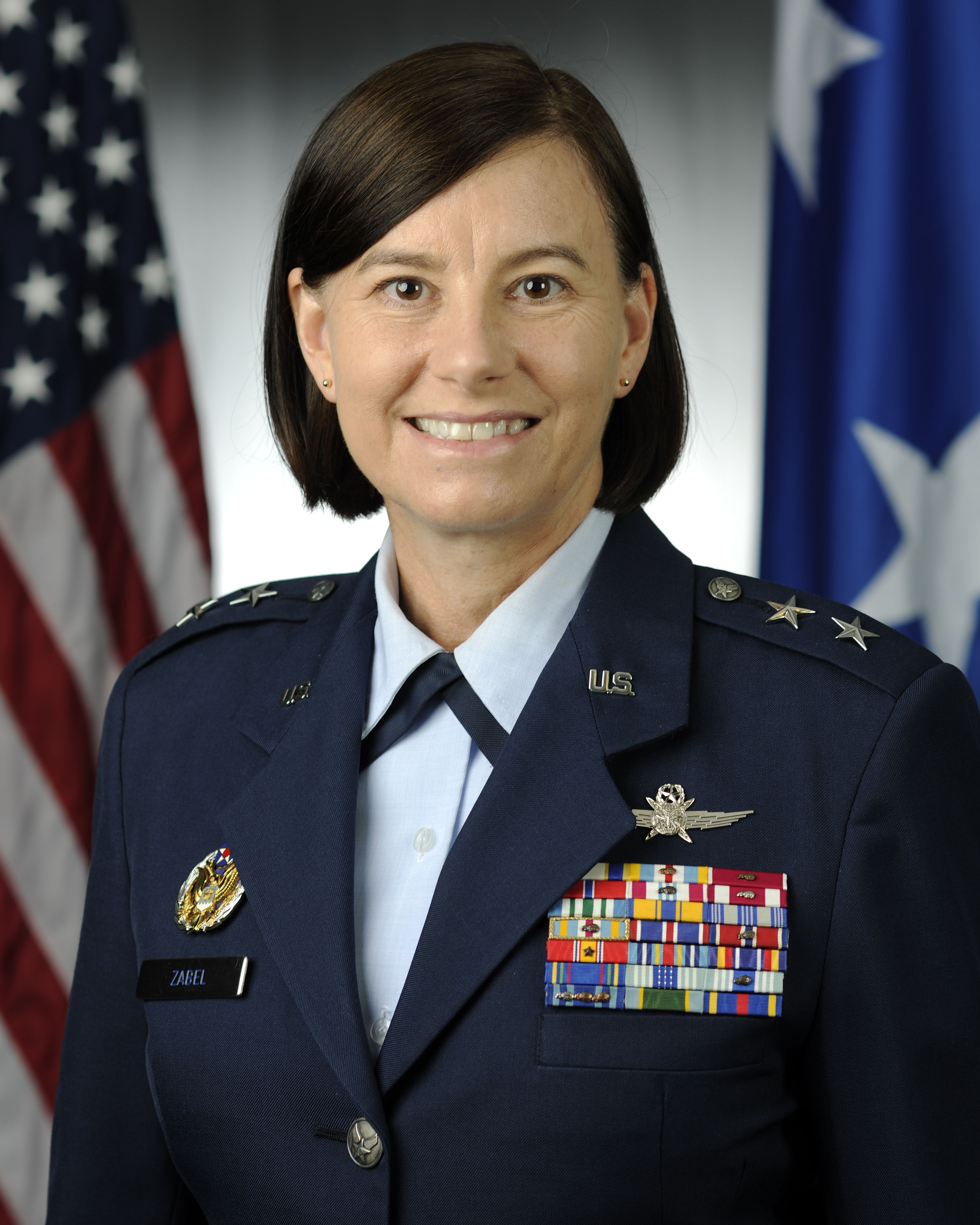
Major General of the U.S. Air Force Sarah E. Zabel

== See also ==
- Minority-serving institution
