= 5th Space Operations Squadron =

Unit of the United States Space Force

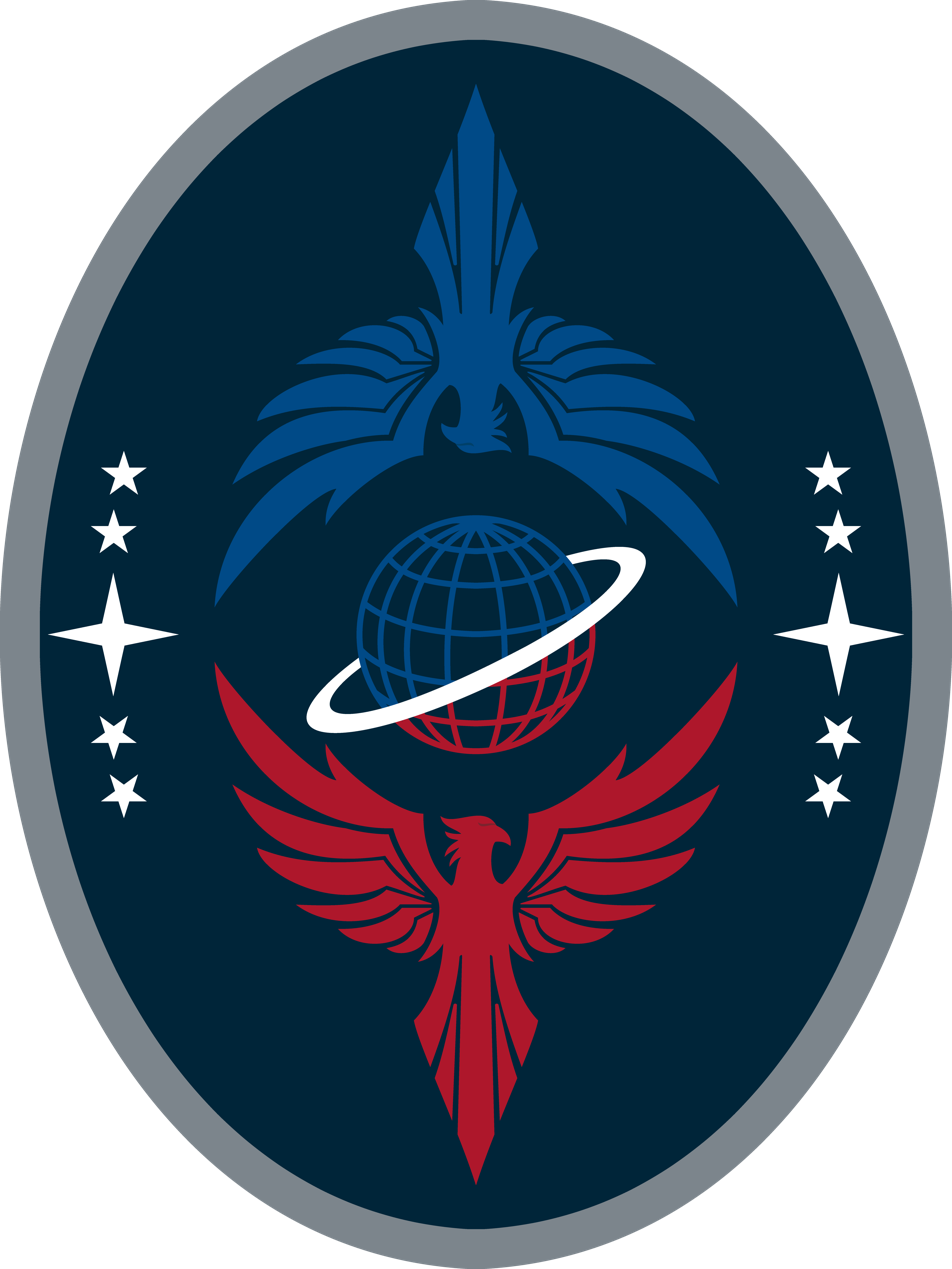
- Emblem of the 5th Space Operations Squadron
- Active: 1989–1992; 1993–2000; 2024–present
- Country: United States
- Branch: United States Space Force
- Role: Technology demonstration
- Part of: Space Delta 9
- Headquarters: Joint Base Anacostia–Bolling, Washington D.C.
- Motto: Scanning the Globe (1989–1994) Pioneers of Space (1994–present)
- Decorations: Air Force Outstanding Unit Award

Commanders
- Current commander: Lt Col Ryan J. Foster

Insignia
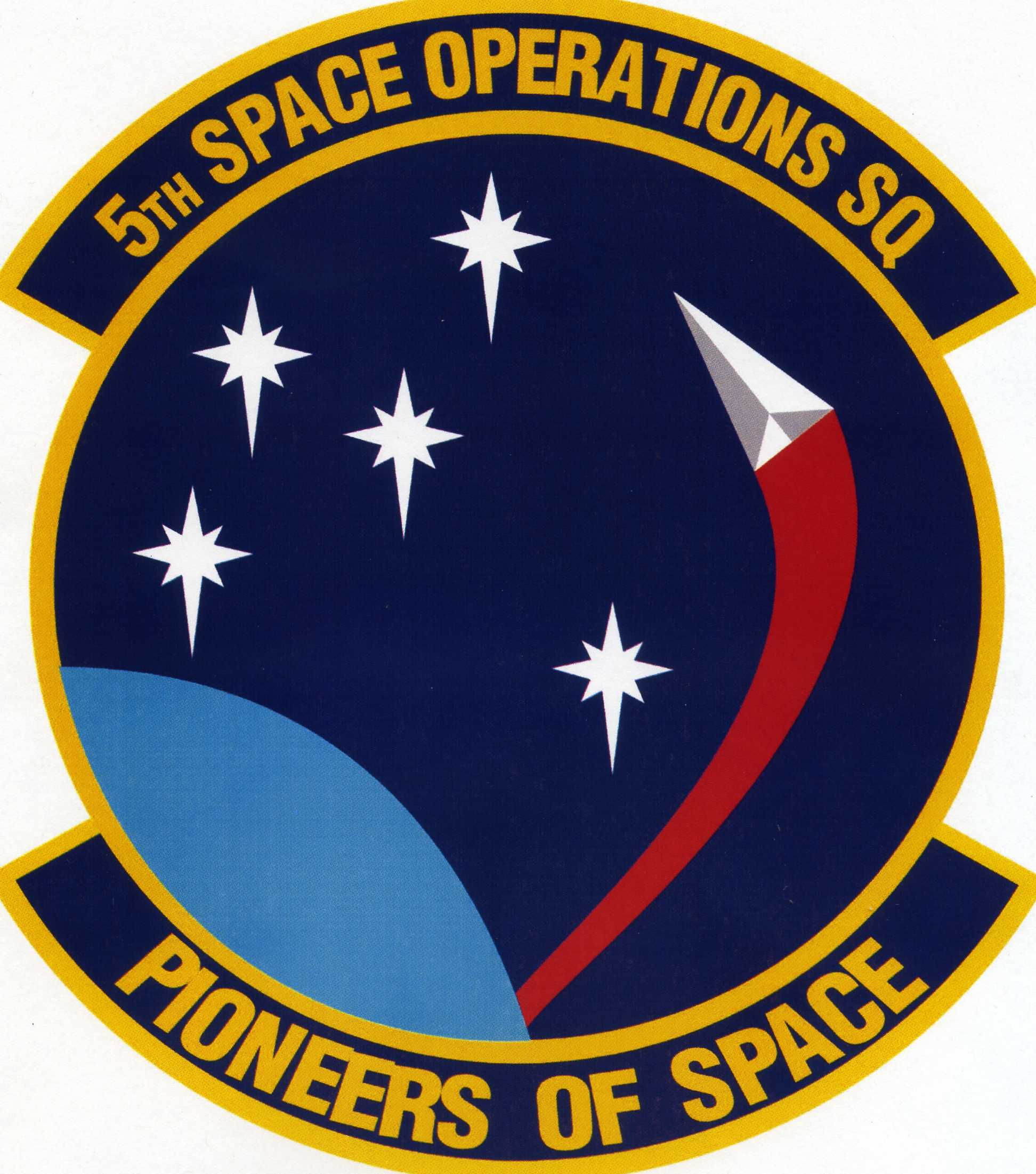
- 5th Space Operations Squadron emblem (approved 9 December 1994)

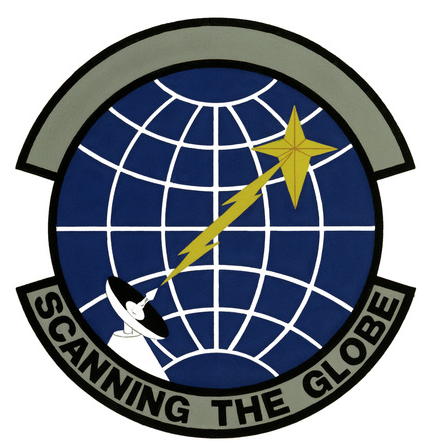
- 5th Satellite Control Squadron emblem (approved 25 August 1989)

The 5th Space Operations Squadron (5 SOPS) is a United States Space Force unit responsible for operating the X-37B Orbital Test Vehicle. It is located at Joint Base Anacostia–Bolling, District of Columbia.

== History ==
The 5th Expeditionary Space Operations Squadron (ESOPS), originally part of the Air Force Satellite Control Facility, was provisionally established as Operating Location-A of the 750th Space Group on 1 October 1992. It was officially activated on 22 November 1993 under the 50th Operations Group. The formation followed the division of the Air Force Satellite Control Facility into the 2nd Space Test Group and the Consolidated Space Test Center (CSTC) on 1 October 1987, coinciding with the Air Force Space Command's acquisition of Onizuka Air Force Base (later Onizuka Air Station).

In the year it was established, the 5th ESOPS assumed the responsibilities of the 2nd Satellite Tracking Group Operations Division and the 1999th Communications Squadron Operations Division. Following the 1995 Base Realignment and Closure Committee's directives, the 21st Space Operations Squadron (SOS) assumed the functions of the 750th Space Group, its subordinate units, and the 5th Space Operations Squadron.

Shortly after its establishment, the squadron undertook a number of operations, including the launch of a DSCS III and a NATO IV communications satellite, support for the Hubble Space Telescope repair mission, and the deployment of the Inertial Upper Stage (IUS) for NASA missions. These missions encompassed the launch of all seven Tracking and Data Relay Satellites (TDRS) and three interplanetary spacecraft: Galileo to Jupiter, Magellan to Venus, and Ulysses to the Sun.

The 5th ESOPS was inactivated in 2000. On 3 June 2024, the unit was reactivated as part of Space Delta 9 under the United States Space Force to oversee operations of the X-37B Orbital Test Vehicle.

== Lineage ==
- Constituted as the 5th Satellite Control Squadron on 11 April 1989
- Activated on 1 May 1989
- Redesignated as the 5th Space Operations Squadron on 30 January 1992
- Inactivated on 31 July 1992
- Activated on 22 November 1993
- Inactivated on 13 June 2000
- Redesignated as the 5th Expeditionary Space Operations Squadron and converted to provisional status on 5 December 2007
- Redesignated as the 5th Space Operations Squadron and activated on 3 June 2024

=== Assignments ===
- 1000th Satellite Operations Group, 1 May 1989 – 31 July 1992
- 50th Operations Group, 22 November 1993 – 13 June 2000
- Air Force Space Command to activate or inactivate at any time after 5 December 2007
- Space Delta 9, 3 June 2024 – present

== Locations ==
- Fairchild Air Force Base, Washington, 1 May 1989 – 31 July 1992
- Onizuka Air Force Station, California, 22 November 1993 – 13 June 2000
- Joint Base Anacostia–Bolling, Washington D.C., 3 June 2024 – present

== Satellites operated ==
- Defense Meteorological Satellite Program (1989–1992)
- Defense Satellite Communications System III (1993–1995)
- NATO III (1993–1995)
- SkyNet IV (1993–1995)
- Inertial Upper Stage (1993–1995)
- Tracking and Data Relay Satellite
- X-37B Orbital Test Vehicle (2024–present)
