= General King =

General King may refer to:

- Campbell King (1871–1953), U.S. Army major general
- Charles King (general) (1844–1933), U.S. Army brigadier general in the Spanish–American War
- Cyrus King (1772–1817), Massachusetts Militia major general
- Edward Leonard King (1873–1933), U.S. Army major general
- Edward P. King (1884–1958), U.S. Army major general
- Frank King (British Army officer) (1919–1998), British Army general
- Henry King (British Army officer) (1776–1839), British Army lieutenant general
- James C. King (born 1946), U.S. Maring Corps lieutenant general
- Jeffrey R. King (fl. 1990s–2020s), U.S. Air Force major general
- John F. King (fl. 1980s–2020s), U.S. Army major general
- John H. King (1820–1888), Union Army brigadier general in the American Civil War
- Robert King, 1st Viscount Lorton (1773–1854), British Army general
- Robert King (British Army officer) (1904–1983), British Army major general
- Rufus King (general) (1814–1876), Union Army brigadier general in the American Civil War
- Wilburn Hill King (1839–1910), Confederate States Army brigadier general by assignment, but not officially appointed and confirmed
- William G. King Jr. (1918–2009), U.S. Air Force brigadier general

== See also ==
- Attorney General King (disambiguation)
