= 6593d Test Squadron =

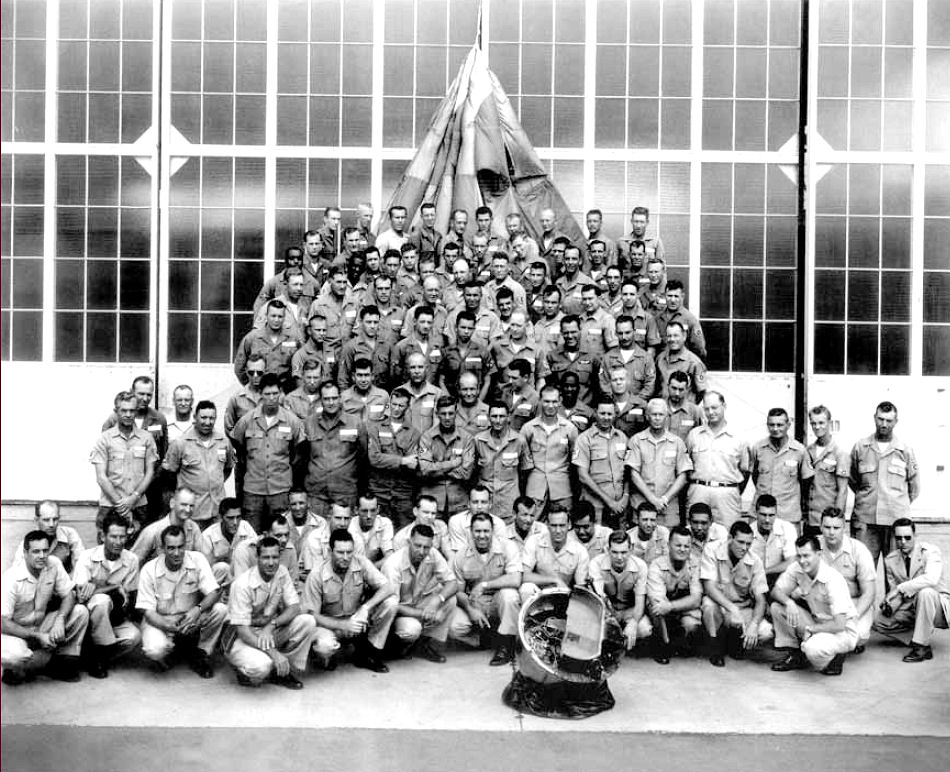
- The 6593d Test Squadron (Special) posing with the Discoverer 14 capsule in 1960
- Active: 1958–1972
- Country: United States
- Branch: United States Air Force
- Type: Satellite payload recovery

Insignia
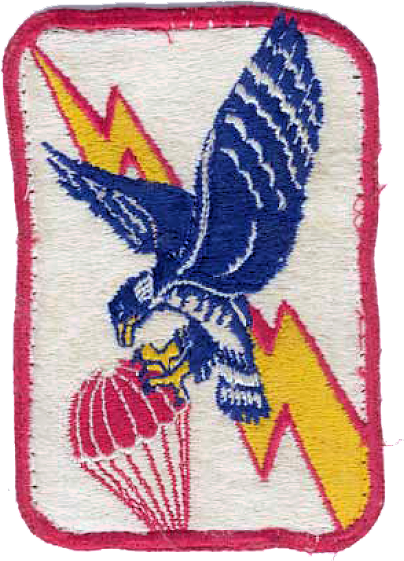
- 6593d Test Squadron emblem

The 6593d Test Squadron is an inactive United States Air Force unit. Its last was assigned to the 6594th Test Group, stationed at Hickam AFB, Hawaii. It was inactivated on 1 July 1972.

== Mission ==
The 6593d Test Squadron's mission was to develop and maintain a capability of effect the aerial recovery of a capsule ejected from an orbiting satellite.

The work performed by the squadron was classified until 1995, as its primary mission was directed at recovering film imaged by the Corona strategic reconnaissance satellites produced and operated by the Air Force and the Central Intelligence Agency (CIA). The Corona satellites were the first operational United States photographic reconnaissance satellites used for intelligence purposes.

== History ==
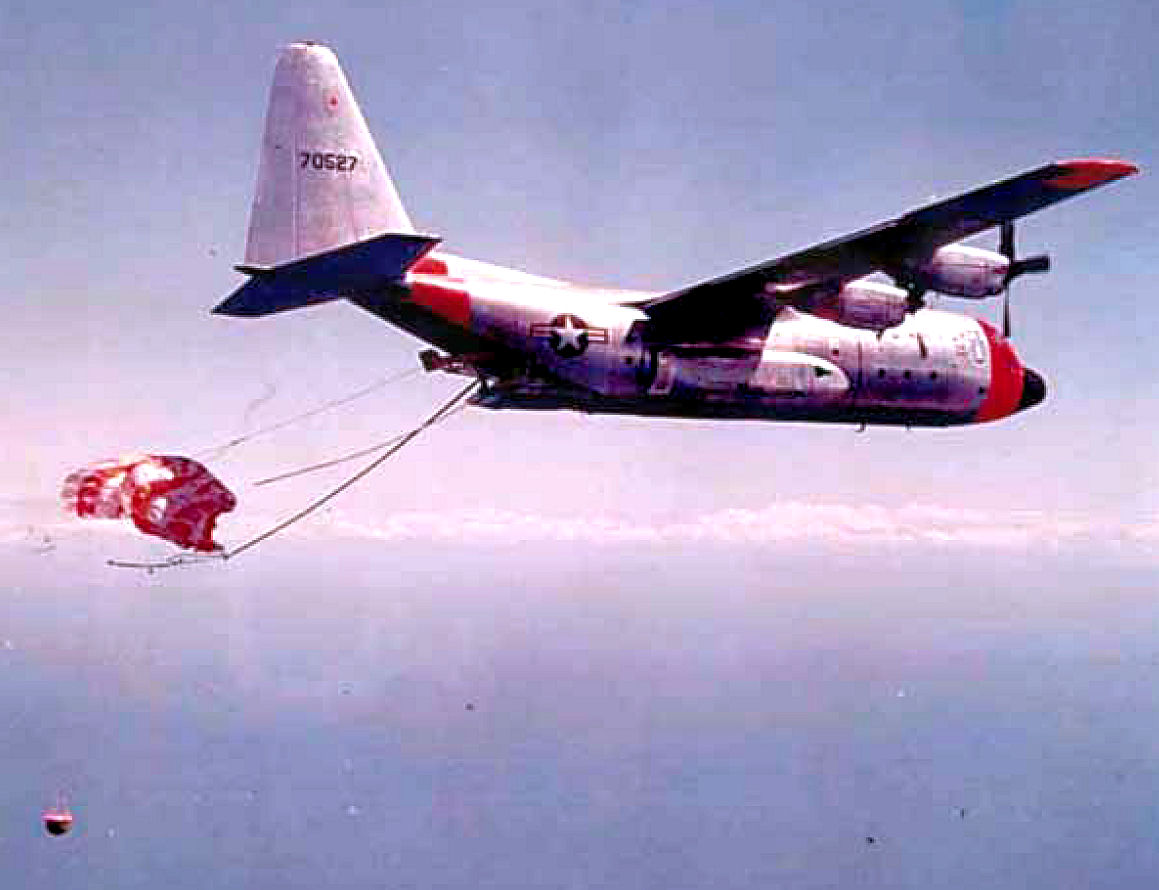
Squadron Lockheed JC-130B 57-0527 conducting a flight test recovery of a parachute and capsule at Edwards Air Force Base, 1963.

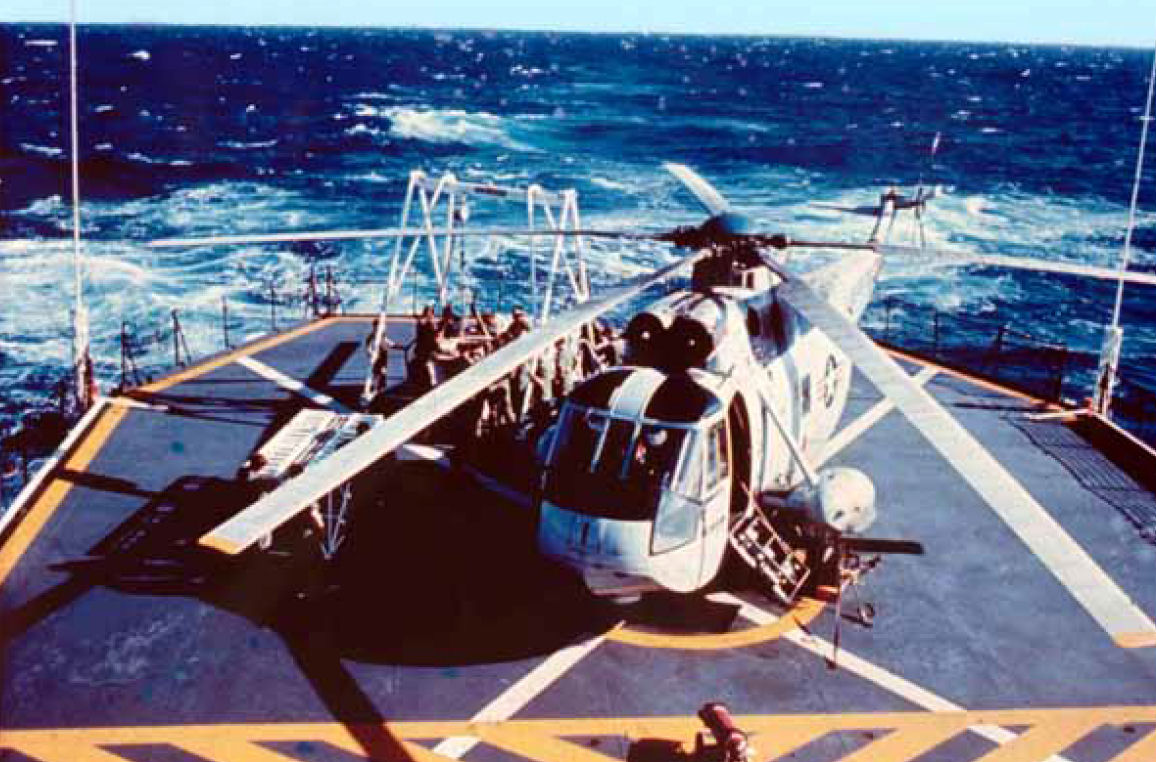
Squadron – Sikorsky CH-3B helicopter on the deck of a recovery ship supporting the Corona Program.

The Discoverer/Corona reconnaissance satellite was a revolutionary breakthrough in intelligence gathering and altered the course of the Cold War. From 1960 to 1972, the recovery of the Corona space capsules was among the highest priorities of the U.S. Department of Defense and the Intelligence Community.

The 6593d Test Squadron (Special) conducted one of the most important Air Force missions of the Cold War. The 6593d was one of the first Air Force organizations to combine air and space as integral parts of its mission. The classified status of the Corona program did not permit the details of Corona or its aerial recovery to be released until the declassification of Corona in 1995.

Initially flying modified C-119J Flying Boxcars, equipped with rope winches and large hooks that were extended in the air behind the plane to "snag" the parachute of the payload. Later, the Flying Boxcars were replaced by larger C-130B Hercules aircraft, designated JC-130B. The squadron would fly out to a target recovery area, spacing its airplanes within the "box" for maximum coverage. A telemetry signal from the payload would send out a signal that could be triangulated on to locate where the location of the satellite, and the plane that was in the best location would proceed to recover it.

On 19 August 1960, the squadron successfully recovered the Discoverer 14 payload, containing film of the first pictures of the earth's surface made from space. It was also the first recovery of an object placed in earth orbit.

The squadron wanted to recover the payloads in midair while parachuting to the earth, although occasionally they were recovered from the Pacific Ocean. When recoveries from the ocean were necessary, the squadron was equipped with helicopters and also had operational control of two Navy ships to retrieve it from the ocean. Ocean recoveries, however, could damage the payload as when it hit the water, it could go under the water surface, and salt water getting inside could damage the film and other components of the payload.

Throughout the 1960s as Corona Satellites were launched, their invaluable film payloads were retrieved by the squadron. It was stated by one of the units senior NCOs, that satellite payload retrieval became almost a routine mission for the well-practiced unit. Many of the squadron members served extended tours with the unit, their experience in recovery of the capsules being invaluable to its success. The unit was inactivated in 1972 and its mission turned over to the 6594th Test Group.

== Lineage ==
- Designated and organized as the 6593d Test Squadron (Special) on 1 August 1958

Inactivated on 1 July 1972

=== Assignments ===
- Air Research and Development Command, 1 August 1958
- 6594th Recovery Control Group, 1 November 1959

=== Stations ===
- Edwards Air Force Base, California, 1 August 1958
- Hickam Air Force Base, Hawaii, 1 November 1959 – 1 July 1972

=== Aircraft ===
- C-119J Flying Boxcar, 1958–1962
- JC-130B Hercules, 1961–1972
- Piasecki H-21B, 1962–1972
- Sikorsky CH-3B, 1963–1972

=== Ships ===
The squadron had operational control of the following United States Navy Ships for satellite recovery operations:

- USS Longview (T-AGM-3), 1 February 1965 – 1 July 1972
- USS Sunnyvale (T-AGM-5), 1 February 1965 – 1 July 1972
