= William G. King Jr. =

United States Air Force general

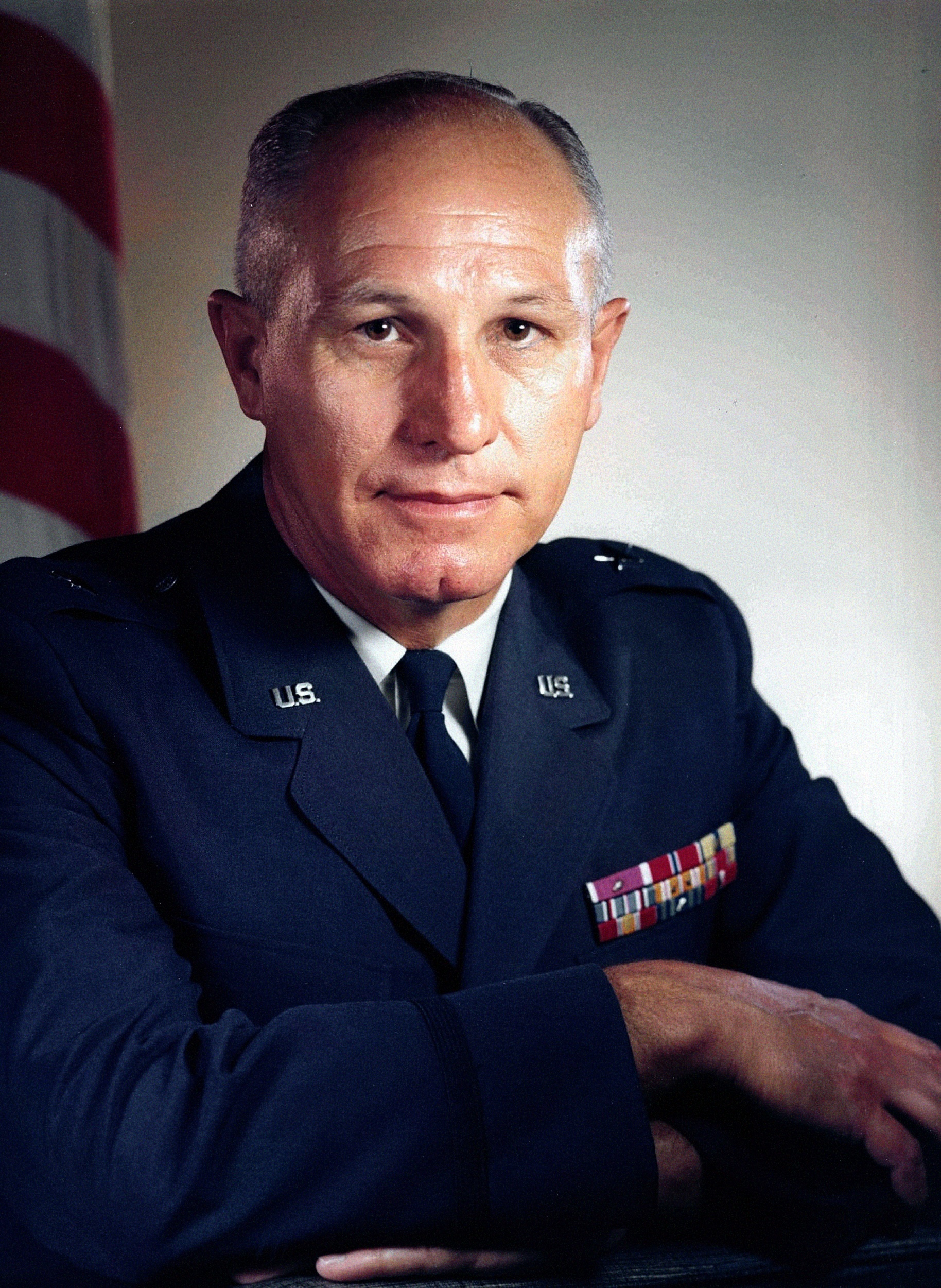
- Born: 14 December 1918; Topeka, Kansas, U.S.
- Died: 21 June 2009 (aged 90)
- Military career
- Allegiance: United States
- Branch: United States Army (1941–1947); United States Air Force (1947–1971)
- Service years: 1941–1971
- Rank: Brigadier General
- Commands: Air Force Satellite Control Facility
- Conflicts: World War II: Battle of Guam; Battle of Leyte; Battle of Okinawa
- Awards: Air Force Distinguished Service Medal; Legion of Merit (2); Bronze Star Medal; Air Force Commendation Medal (2)

William Gregg King Jr. (14 December 1918 – 21 June 2009) was a brigadier general in the United States Air Force (USAF). After service with the United States Army in World War II, he joined the USAF in 1947. He helped establish the Eastern Test Range at Cape Canaveral, Florida, was project officer for the SM-62 Snark cruise missile, helped initiate the WS-117L military satellite program, worked on the SAMOS reconnaissance satellite, commanded the Air Force Satellite Control Facility, and was director of the National Reconnaissance Office (NRO) Project A.

== Early life and career ==
William Gregg King Jr. was born in Topeka, Kansas, on 14 December 1918. He graduated from Dodge City High School in 1937, and entered Kansas State University where he received military training with the Reserve Officer Training Corps (ROTC). King's education was interrupted in 1941 by World War II, when he was commissioned through the ROTC as a second lieutenant in the United States Army Coast Artillery Corps and called up for active duty. During the war he served as an antiaircraft artillery officer on Guam, Leyte and Okinawa.

== Postwar military career ==
After the war, King completed interrupted studies at the University of Kansas, from which he graduated with his Bachelor of Science degree in engineering in January 1946. He accepted a regular Army commission in United States Army Corps of Engineers, and was a group commander at the Aviation Engineers Training School at Fort Francis E. Warren in Wyoming. He transferred to the United States Air Force when it became a separate service in 1947. King completed a training course on guided missiles at Fort Bliss, Texas, and was assigned to the newly formed Joint Long Range Proving Ground at Patrick Air Force Base in Florida. He was involved in the exploration and surveys of the islands where downrange stations were subsequently established as part of the Eastern Test Range at Cape Canaveral, Florida, and for a time was the station commander of the Grand Bahama Auxiliary Air Force Base.

King entered the University of Chicago, which awarded him a Master of Business Administration degree in research and development management in 1954. He joined the Air Research and Development Command at Wright-Patterson Air Force Base in Ohio in 1955, where he was initially engaged in writing the systems requirements for a medium-range, tactical guided missile. King read a report from RAND Corporation on reconnaissance satellites, and became convinced that such capabilities would become feasible in the near future. He was involved in the creation of a space program office at Wright-Patterson which became known as the Advanced Reconnaissance Satellite Program Office. As its project officer he briefed the Secretary of the Air Force, and convinced him to provide $2 million (equivalent to $18.2 million in 2025) for systems concept studies. King was a member of the selection committee which chose Lockheed Corporation as the contractor for the WS-117L military satellite program.

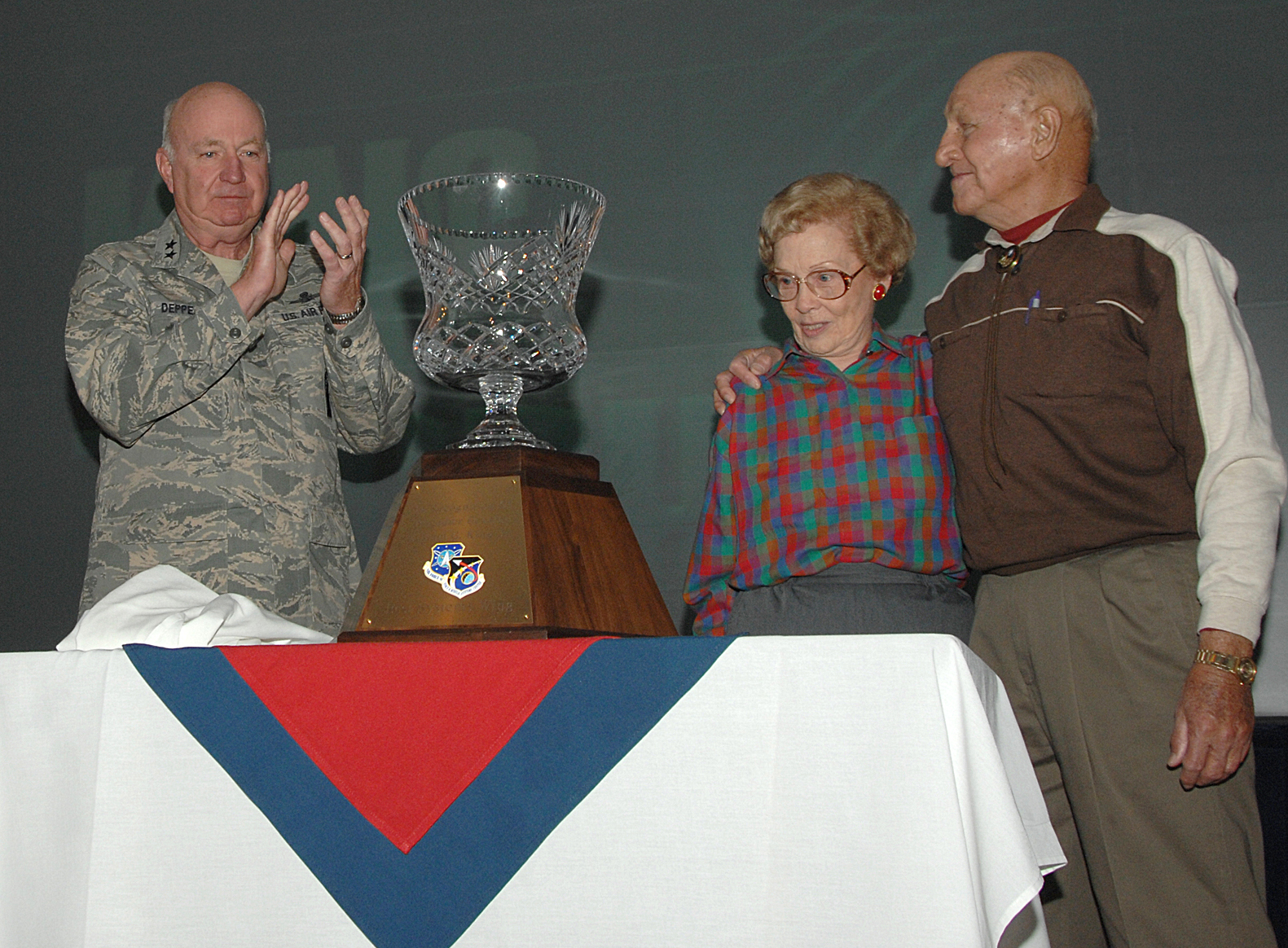
Major General Thomas F. Deppe (left) applauds at the unveiling of the Brigadier General William G. King trophy for the command's best systems wing. King (right) and his wife Mary are seeing the trophy for the first time.

In 1957, King became the weapons systems project officer for the SM-62 Snark intercontinental range surface-to-surface cruise missile, and he oversaw its deployment at Presque Isle Air Force Base in Maine. In July 1959 he joined the Space Systems Division in Los Angeles, where he worked in the project office of the SAMOS reconnaissance satellite, which became the Office of Special Projects of the National Reconnaissance Office (NRO) in 1961. He became the Deputy Director, Special Projects in the Office of the Secretary of the Air Force in March 1962, a position he held until September 1966, when he became the commander of the Air Force Satellite Control Facility, the headquarters of the worldwide tracking network, at Los Angeles Air Force Station in Sunnyvale, California.

In August 1967, King became the assistant deputy chief of staff for operations of the Air Force Systems Command at Andrews Air Force Base in Maryland. He was promoted to brigadier general in 1968, and returned to the West Coast in January 1969 as assistant to the director of the Office of Special Projects, NRO Program A, the component of the NRO responsible for USAF satellites. He became Program A director in July that year, a post he held until his retirement on 31 March 1971.

== Honors, awards and legacy ==
King's military decorations include the Air Force Distinguished Service Medal, Legion of Merit with oak leaf cluster, Bronze Star Medal, and Air Force Commendation Medal with oak leaf cluster. He was honored as a space pioneer in 1989 and 1997, receiving honors from the Smithsonian Institution in 1989, and by the Air Force Space Command in 1997. The Brigadier General William G. King trophy for the Space Command's best systems wing was named after him in 2008. He died on 21 June 2009.
