= General Randolph =

General Randolph may refer to:

- Bernard P. Randolph (1933–2021), U.S. Air Force general
- George W. Randolph (1818–1867), Confederate States Army brigadier general
- Wallace F. Randolph (1841–1910), U.S. Army major general
