= Lawrence A. Skantze =

United States Air Force general

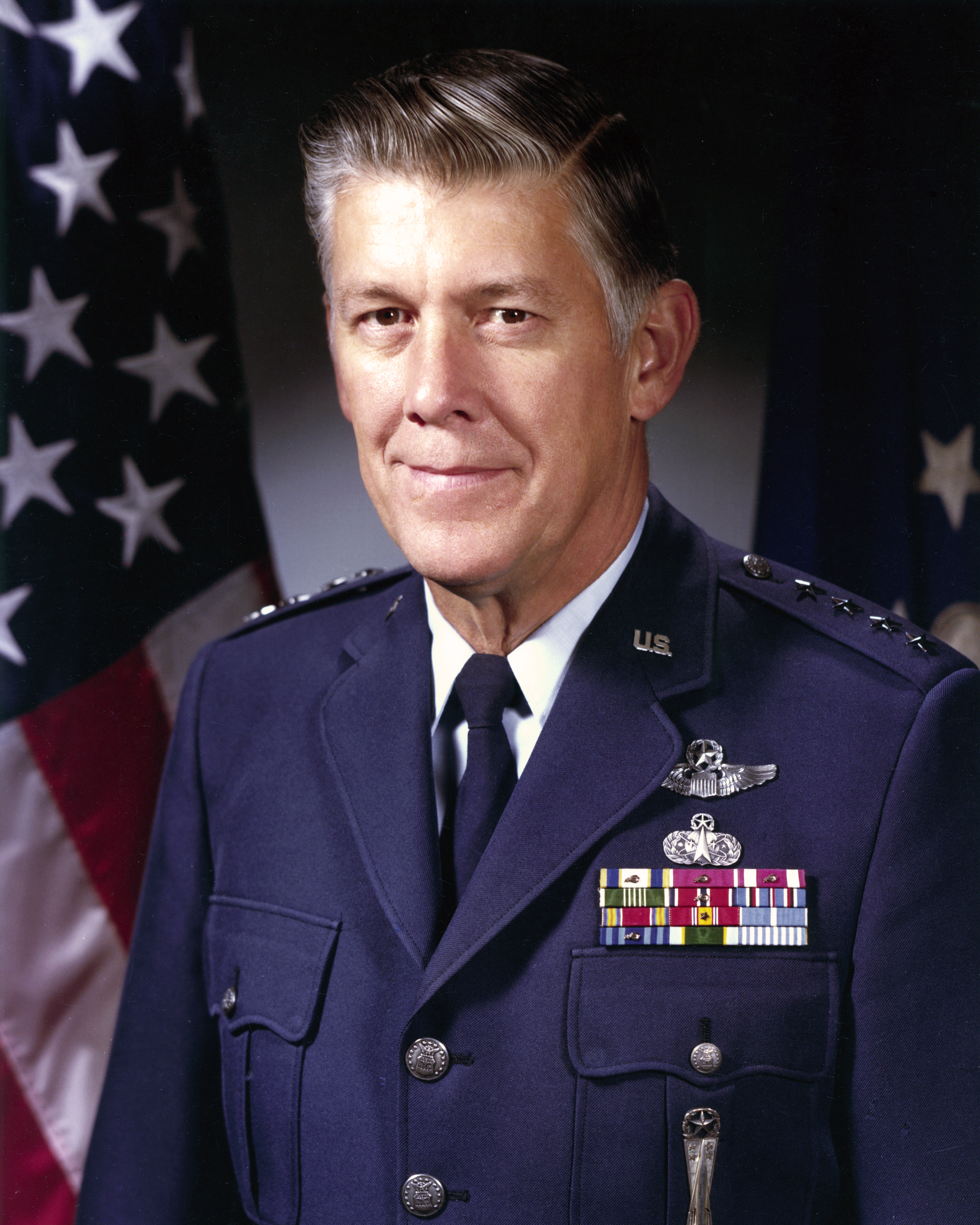
- General Lawrence A. Skantze
- Born: June 24, 1928; The Bronx, New York
- Died: June 18, 2018 (aged 89); McLean, Virginia
- Military career
- Allegiance: United States
- Branch: United States Navy; United States Air Force
- Service years: 1946–1987
- Rank: General
- Commands: Air Force Systems Command; Aeronautical Systems Division
- Conflicts: Korean War
- Awards: Air Force Distinguished Service Medal (2); Legion of Merit (2); Meritorious Service Medal (2)

Lawrence Albert Skantze (June 24, 1928 – June 18, 2018) was a four-star general in the United States Air Force (USAF). He served as commander, Air Force Systems Command at Andrews Air Force Base, Maryland.

== Biography ==
Skantze was born on June 24, 1928, in the Bronx, New York. After graduation from Cardinal Hayes High School in 1946, he enlisted in the United States Navy and served as a radio operator. In 1948 he received a competitive appointment from the U.S. Atlantic Fleet to the United States Naval Academy at Annapolis, Maryland, and graduated in 1952 with a Bachelor of Science degree in engineering and a commission as a second lieutenant in the United States Air Force. He received a Master of Science degree in nuclear engineering from the Air Force Institute of Technology at Wright-Patterson Air Force Base, Ohio, in 1959. He completed Squadron Officer School at Maxwell Air Force Base, Alabama, and Armed Forces Staff College at Norfolk, Virginia.

Skantze completed his basic pilot training at Marana, Arizona, and advanced training at Reese Air Force Base, Texas, where he received his pilot wings in August 1953. He next entered B-26 combat crew training and in February 1954 was assigned to the 90th Bombardment Squadron at Kunsan Air Base, South Korea. In January 1955 he returned to the United States to become aide to the commanding general of 14th Air Force at Robins Air Force Base, Georgia. Skantze entered the Air Force Institute of Technology in August 1957 and graduated in 1959.

Skantze's initial research and development assignment was as project engineer with the joint Air Force-Atomic Energy Commission Nuclear Powered Airplane program in Germantown, Maryland. In August 1961 he was a staff officer assigned to the Office of the Deputy Chief of Staff for Research and Development at Headquarters U.S. Air Force, Washington, D.C. From June 1963 to August 1965, he was assistant executive officer to the under secretary of the Air Force.

Graduating from the Armed Forces Staff College the following year, Skantze served for three and a half years as director of system engineering and advanced planning in the Air Force Manned Orbiting Laboratory Program at the Space and Missile Systems Organization in Los Angeles. From August 1969 to May 1971, he was assigned to Headquarters Air Force Systems Command at Andrews Air Force Base, initially as director of assignments and later as an assistant for senior officer management. He then became deputy for the AGM-69A Short-Range Attack Missile at the Aeronautical Systems Division, Wright-Patterson Air Force Base. After serving as deputy for the E-3A Airborne Warning and Control System program at Hanscom Air Force Base, Massachusetts, from June 1973 to June 1977, he returned to Air Force Systems Command headquarters as deputy chief of staff for systems. Skantze took command of the Aeronautical Systems Division at Wright-Patterson Air Force Base in March 1979.

In August 1982, Skantze was named deputy chief of staff for research, development and acquisition at Air Force headquarters. He was responsible for all U.S. Air Force research, development and acquisition programs. Skantze was appointed Vice Chief of Staff of the United States Air Force, Washington, D.C., in October 1983. He assumed command of Air Force Systems Command in August 1984.

Skantze was named as a payload specialist for the classified United States Department of Defense Space Shuttle mission STS-61-N, scheduled for launch on 4 September 1986. This mission was cancelled after the Space Shuttle Challenger disaster on 28 January 1986. Most of the crew (excluding Skantze and Frank J. Casserino) flew on mission STS-28 in 1989.

Skantze was a command pilot and earned the Senior Missile Badge. His military decorations and awards include the Air Force Distinguished Service Medal with oak leaf cluster, Legion of Merit with oak leaf cluster, Meritorious Service Medal with oak leaf cluster and Army Commendation Medal. He was promoted to General on October 6, 1983, with same date of rank, and retired from the United States Air Force on July 31, 1987. He died on June 18, 2018.

Skantze and his wife Patricia Ann "Pat" (Bowers) Skantze (March 20, 1930 – December 15, 2012) were interred at Arlington National Cemetery.
