= Attorney General King =

Attorney General King may refer to:

- Charles D. B. King (1875–1961), Attorney General of Liberia
- Gary King (politician) (born 1954), Attorney General of New Mexico
- Maurice King (lawyer) (born 1936), Attorney-General of Barbados
- Len King (1925–2011), Attorney-General of South Australia
- Troy King (born 1968), Attorney General of the state of Alabama

== See also ==
- General King (disambiguation)
