= James Ferguson (American general) =

United States Air Force general

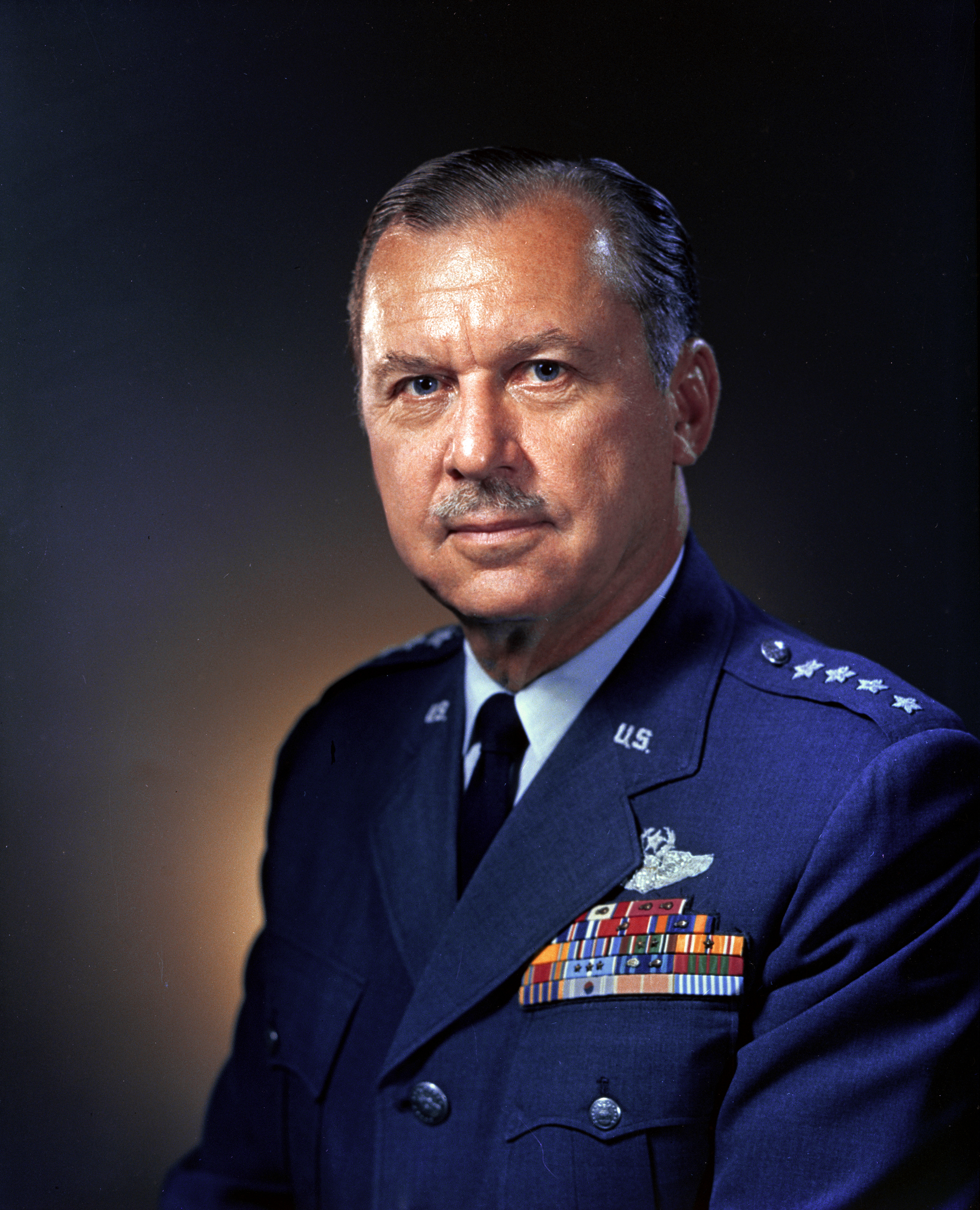
- General James Ferguson
- Born: August 13, 1913; İzmir, Turkey
- Died: July 13, 2000 (aged 86); Venice, Florida, US
- Burial place: Arlington National Cemetery
- Military career
- Allegiance: United States of America
- Branch: United States Air Force
- Service years: 1934–1970
- Rank: General
- Commands: Air Force Systems Command
- Conflicts: World War II
- Awards: Air Force Distinguished Service Medal (2); Legion of Merit (3); Distinguished Flying Cross; Bronze Star (2); Air Medal (2)

General James Ferguson (August 15, 1913 – July 13, 2000) was a U.S. Air Force general and was commander of the Air Force Systems Command at Andrews Air Force Base, Maryland.

== Biography ==
Ferguson was born in İzmir, Turkey, of British parents in 1913. He attended elementary school in Scotland and later settled with his family in Whittier, California. He became a naturalized United States citizen March 28, 1930; graduated from a local high school in 1931, and from Fullerton Junior College in California, in 1934.

He enlisted in the Air Corps in October 1934, began his flying training a year later and completed it in July 1936. He flew as a flying cadet for one year before being commissioned a second lieutenant in June 1937.

He was assigned in March 1940 to Hamilton Field, California as commanding officer of the 79th Pursuit Squadron. In April 1942, he became executive officer of the 20th Pursuit Group at Charlotte, North Carolina, and from July 1942 to October 1943, served as commanding officer of the 337th Fighter Group.

In October 1943, Ferguson organized and commanded the 405th Fighter-Bomber Group at Walterboro, South Carolina, and took it to Europe four months later. He participated with the 405th Group in preinvasion attacks on Europe until his assignment in April 1944 as assistant chief of staff with the 9th Fighter Command. He participated as an air controller on the night of the Normandy invasion and served in various campaigns until the German surrender.

In December 1945 he returned to the United States. He later became an instructor in the Tactical Air Section of the Air Command and Staff College, Maxwell Air Force Base, Alabama.

Ferguson was assigned in November 1947 to the U.S. Air Force advisory group in Ankara, Turkey, and later became chief of that group. He departed for the Far East in June 1950, where he served as assistant to the vice commander and later assistant deputy for operations for the U.S. Far East Air Forces. From June 1951 to February 1952, he was vice commander of the Fifth Air Force in Korea.

He returned to the United States and served as deputy commander of the Ninth Air Force of the Tactical Air Command at Pope Air Force Base, North Carolina, and later at Shaw Air Force Base, South Carolina.

In July 1955, General Ferguson began a series of assignments which have kept him in the vicinity of Washington, D.C., for more than 14 years. First, he became deputy and later director of requirements in the office of the deputy chief of staff for development, Headquarters U.S. Air Force. Then he was named vice commander of the Air Research and Development Command (later Air Force Systems Command) with headquarters at Andrews Air Force Base, Maryland.

In December 1961, General Ferguson became deputy chief of staff for research and development at Headquarters U.S. Air Force. In that position he monitored the total research and development effort in the Air Force. In September 1966 he assumed command of the Air Force Systems Command. He retired from the Air Force on September 1, 1970, and died on July 13, 2000, and was buried in Arlington National Cemetery.

== Awards and decorations ==
His military decorations include the Air Force Distinguished Service Medal with oak leaf cluster, Legion of Merit with two oak leaf clusters, Distinguished Flying Cross, Bronze Star with oak leaf cluster and Air Medal with oak leaf cluster, the Most Excellent Order of the British Empire, Croix de Guerre with Palm (France), Croix de Guerre (Luxembourg), and the Military Merit Ulchi Medal with gold star (Korea).

- Air Force Distinguished Service Medal with one oak leaf cluster
- Legion of Merit with two oak leaf clusters
- Distinguished Flying Cross
- Bronze Star with oak leaf cluster
- Air Medal with oak leaf cluster
