= Air Force Satellite Control Facility =

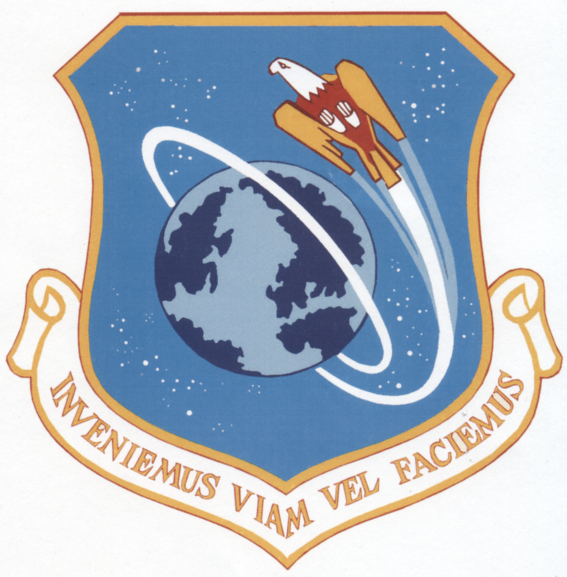
- Air Force Satellite Control Facility emblem
- Active: 1965–1993
- Country: United States
- Branch: United States Air Force
- Type: Satellite Operations
- Role: Command and Control
- Part of: Air Force Systems Command/Air Force Space Command
- Garrison/HQ: Onizuka AFB, California
- Motto: INVENIEMUS VIAM VEL FACIEMUS – "We find the road or we make it"

The United States Air Force's Air Force Satellite Control Facility (AFSCF) was a space command and control unit located at Onizuka AFS, California. It has the distinction of being heavily involved in the world's first reconnaissance satellite program, CORONA. Due to geological hazards (i.e. earthquakes), and the terrorism threat from its proximity to a major transportation link (California Highway 101), the facility's command and control functions were moved to Schriever AFB, Colorado.

== History ==
The Air Force Satellite Control Facility (AFSCF) was originally activated at Los Angeles AFS, California on 18 Jun 1965. It was first assigned to the Space Systems Division of Air Force Systems Command, with later moves under the Space and Missile Systems Organization, and Space Division organizations.

On 15 October 1961, Air Force Systems Command designated the Thule Tracking Station (TTS, 76°30′57″N 68°36′0″W), a Remote Tracking Station (callsign: Polar Orbiting Geophysical Observatory (POGO)) of the Air Force Satellite Control Network near Thule Air Base in Greenland. It became Operating Location 5, 6594th Test Wing (Satellite). The Thule Tracking Station reached operational status on 30 March 1962, with "transportable antenna vans parked in an old Strategic Air Command bomb assembly building." The permanent RTS equipment was emplaced in 1964, and a communications terminal was emplaced on Pingarssuit Mountain—Thule Site N-32.

In 1992 the Thule Tracking Station became Detachment 2, 22nd Space Operations Squadron.

== Lineage ==
Consolidated Space Test Center

- Constituted as the Air Force Satellite Control Facility on 18 June 1965

Activated on 8 July 1965
Redesignated Consolidated Space Test Center on 2 October 1987
Inactivated on 27 August 1993
Consolidated with the Satellite Control And Network Systems Group as the Satellite Control And Network Systems Group on 6 August 2008

Satellite Control and Network Systems Group

- Constituted as the Satellite Control and Network Systems Group on 17 July 2006

Activated on 1 August 2006
Consolidated with the Consolidated Space Test Center on 6 August 2008
Inactivated on 10 November 2010

=== Assignments ===
- Space Systems Division, 8 July 1965
- Space and Missile Systems Organization (later Space Division, Space Systems Division, Space and Missile Systems Center), 1 July 1967 – 27 August 1993
- Space and Missile Systems Center, 1 August 2006 – 10 November 2010

=== Stations ===
- Los Angeles Air Force Station, 8 July 1965
- Sunnyvale Air Force Station (later Onizuka Air Force Station, Onizuka Air Force Base), unknown – 27 August 1993
- Los Angeles Air Force Base, 1 August 2006 – 10 November 2010

== Predecessors ==
Field Office of Air Force Ballistic Missile Division (15 Aug 1958 – 6 Apr 1959)
6594th Aerospace Test Wing
6594th Test Wing (6 Apr 1959 – 15 Jan 1960)
6594th Test Wing (Satellite) (15 Jan 1960 – 1 Nov 1961)
6594th Aerospace Test Wing (1 Nov 1961 – 1 Jul 1965)

== Assignments ==
=== Major Command/Field Operating Agency ===
- Air Force Space Command (??-27 Aug 1993)
- Air Force Systems Command (1 Jul 1965-27 )

== Elements assigned ==
- 6594th Aerospace Test Wing (6 Apr 1959 – 1 Jul 1965)
  - Detachment 1, Donnelly Radio Relay Site, Delta Junction, Alaska (15 Apr 1962 – 1 Jul 1965)
- 6594th Support Group (1 Jul 1965 – 1 Oct 1987)
- 6594th Recovery Control Group (1 Jul 1965 – 30 Sep 1986)
- 6594th Launch Squadron (1 Jun 1959 – 15 Jul 1961)
- 6594th Data Processing Squadron (1 Jul 1959 – 1 Oct 1960)
- 6596th Instrumentation Squadron, Vandenberg AFB, California (1 Jul 1959 – 30 Jun 1972)
- 6594th Instrumentation Squadron (1 Oct 1959 – 1 Jul 1965)
- 6595th Test Squadron (20 Feb 1961 – 1 Jul 1965)

=== Detachments ===
- Det 1 – Sunnyvale, California (1 Jul 1965 – 1 Jul 1977)
- Det 2 – Vandenberg Tracking Station, California (1 Oct 1979 – 1 Oct 1987)
- Det 3 – Thule Tracking Station, Greenland (1 Oct 1979 – 1 Oct 1987)
- Det 4 – Mahé, Seychelles (15 Jul 1972 – 1 Oct 1987)
- Det 5 – Guam Tracking Station, Guam (1 Oct 1979 – 1 Oct 1987)
- Det 6 – Hawaii Tracking Station, Hawaii (1 Oct 1979 – 1 Oct 1987)
- Det 7 – Sunnyvale AFS (later Onizuka AFS), California (17 Apr 1987 – 30 Sep 1987) (later moved to Los Angeles AFS, California from 30 Sep 1987 until inactivation on 15 Jul 1991)

== Spacecraft operated ==
- Global Positioning System (GPS)
- Fleet Satellite Communications System (FLTSATCOM)
- Various satellites of the Space Test Program

== See also ==
- 6594th Test Group
