= 750th Space Group =

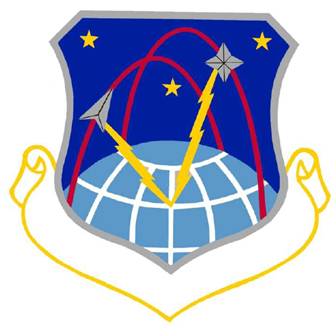
- 750th Space Group emblem
- Active: 30 January 1992 – 25 June 1999
- Country: United States
- Branch: United States Air Force
- Type: Space Operations
- Role: Satellite Command and Control
- Size: 780
- Part of: USAF Group
- Garrison/HQ: Onizuka AFS, California
- Decorations: AFOUA

The United States Air Force's 750th Space Group was a space operations unit located at Onizuka Air Force Station, California. its predecessor was formed on 1 October 1987; it assumed the designation of the 750th Space Group on 30 January 1992, and it was inactivated on 25 June 1999.

== History ==
The 750 SG inactivated in June 1999, following the recommendation of the 1995 Base Realignment and Closure Commission. Primary responsibilities for the Air Force Satellite Control Network (AFSCN) mission transferred to the 22d Space Operations Squadron, 50th Operations Group, 50th Space Wing, Schriever AFB, Colorado and Air Force support to Space Shuttle missions transferred to the 21st Space Operations Squadron, 50th Operations Group, 50th Space Wing, which stood up at Onizuka AFS. That squadron also provided a necessary backup for AFSCN operations.

== Assignments ==
=== Major Command/Gaining Command ===
- Air Force Space Command (30 Jan 1992 – 25 Jun 1999)

== Wings/Groups ==
- 50th Space Wing (30 Jan 1992 – 25 Jun 1999)
- 2d Space Wing (1 Oct 1987 – 30 Jan 1992)

== Previous Designations ==
- 750th Space Group (30 Jan 1992 – 25 Jun 1999)
- 2d Satellite Tracking Group (1 Oct 1987 – 30 Jan 1992)

== Squadrons assigned ==
- 129th Medical Squadron
- 750th Support Squadron

=== Detachments ===
- Detachment 1, 750th Space Group – Vandenberg AFB, California (1 Oct 1987 – 1 Jun 1997)
- Detachment 2, 750th Space Group – New Boston AFS, New Hampshire (1 Oct 1987 – 1 Nov 1991)
- Detachment 3, 750th Space Group – Thule AB, Greenland (1 Oct 1987 – 1 Jun 1997)
- Detachment 4, 750th Space Group – Mahe Space Tracking Station, Seychelles (1 Oct 1987 – 30 Sep 1996)
- Detachment 5, 750th Space Group – Andersen AFB, Guam (1 Oct 1987 – 1 Jun 1997)
- Detachment 6, 750th Space Group – Kaena Point, Hawaii (1 Oct 1987 – 1 Jun 1997)
- Detachment 7, 750th Space Group – Falcon AFB, Colorado (17 Jun 1988 – 1 Jul 1993)
- Detachment 8, 750th Space Group – Diego Garcia, British Indian Ocean Territory (1 Jul 1994 – 1 Jun 1997)
- Detachment 9, 750th Space Group – Falcon AFB, Colorado (1 May 1989 – 1 Oct 1991)

== Commanders ==
- Col Michael A. Hamel (1994–1995)

== Bases stationed ==
- Onizuka AFS, California ()

== Equipment Operated ==
- Air Force Satellite Control Network (???-???)
- Defense Satellite Communications System (???-???)

== Decorations ==
- Air Force Outstanding Unit Award
  - 1 Oct 1998 – 25 Jun 1999
  - 1 Jan 1997-31 Dec 1997
  - 1 Oct 1996 – 30 Sep 1997
  - 1 Sep 1993-31 Aug 1995
  - 1 Sep 1990 – 31 Aug 1991
  - 1 Dec 1987-30 Nov 1989
