= Air Force Systems Command =

Inactive U.S. Air Force major command

Air Force Systems Command (AFSC)
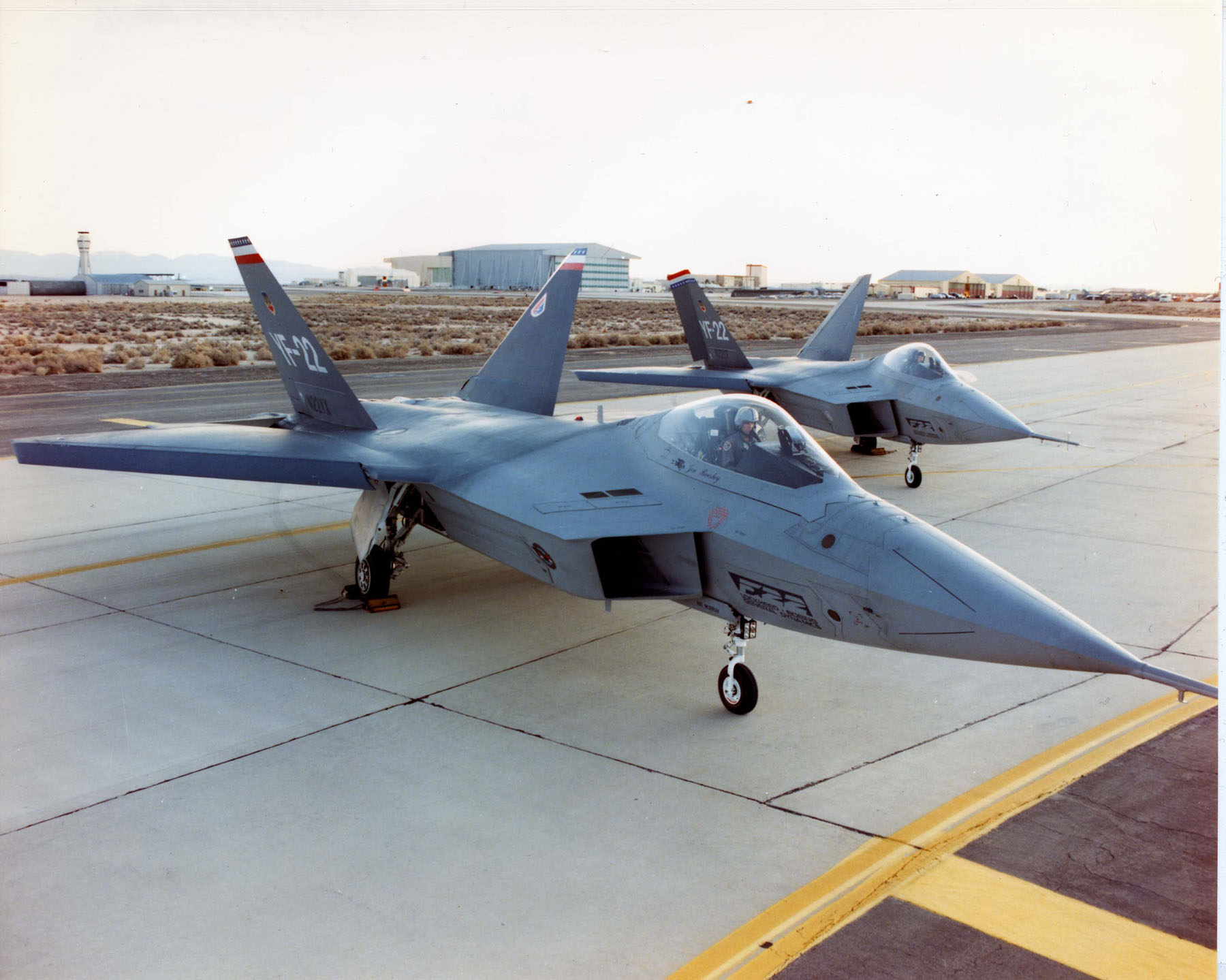
- Lockheed-Boeing-General Dynamics YF-22 Advanced Tactical Fighters, 1990. The YF-22 was the last major weapons system delivered to Air Force Systems Command prior to its inactivation and merger into Air Force Materiel Command.
- Active: 1 February 1950 – 1 July 1992
- Country: United States of America
- Branch: United States Air Force
- Type: Major Command
- Garrison/HQ: Baltimore, Maryland (1950–1958); Andrews Air Force Base, Maryland (1958–92)

Insignia
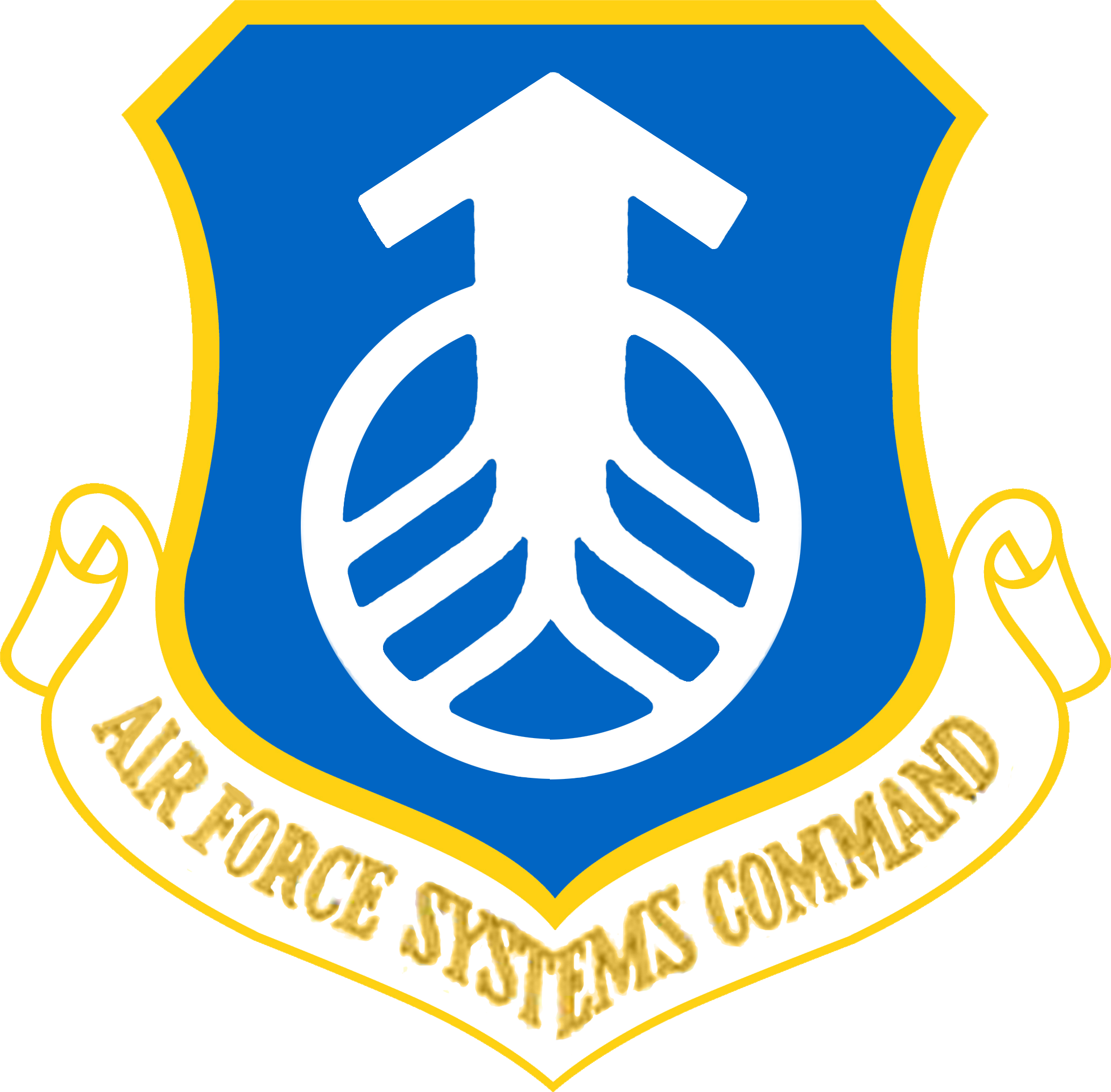
- Emblem of Air Force Systems Command (1961–1992)

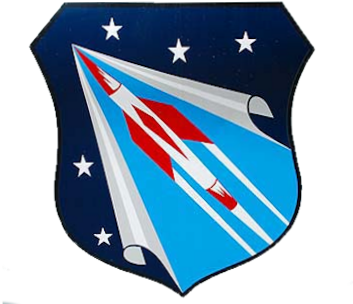
- Emblem of Air Research and Development Command (1950–1961)

The Air Force Systems Command (AFSC) is an inactive United States Air Force Major Command. It was established in April 1951, being split off from Air Materiel Command. The mission of AFSC was Research and Development for new weapons systems.

AFSC took on engineering functions which formerly resided in the Air Materiel Command (AMC), the Army Air Forces Technical Service Command, and the Air Technical Service Command (ATSC) as a separate research and development command in 1950. It incorporated Air Proving Ground Command in 1957. On 1 July 1992, AFSC and Air Force Logistics Command were merged to form the Air Force Materiel Command, located at Wright-Patterson Air Force Base, Ohio.

In the reorganization of 1961, Air Force Systems Command acquired the materiel procurement function from Air Force Logistics Command. It was re-integrated with Air Force Logistics Command in 1992.

== History ==
The Second World War had shown the destructiveness of aerial attack and made General Henry H. Arnold, Commanding General of the Army Air Forces, an aggressive advocate for aeronautical research. On 7 November 1944, Arnold directed the AAF Scientific Advisory Group (SAG) to study the technological achievements of America's wartime allies and provide a blueprint for large-scale research and development of science and advanced technology for the Air Force. However, the Army Air Forces needed to achieve independence, which it did on 18 September 1947, with its transition into an independent United States Air Force. Also, the role of the Air Force in the postwar world had to be defined. The 1948 Finletter Commission published its report, Survival in the Air Age, in January 1948. It set forth a new concept of airpower, as a powerful peacetime force able to counter any enemy air attack.

The Finletter Report inspired a group of senior USAF officers with backgrounds in engineering and related fields to analyze the existing R&D organization. Their findings, and the salesmanship of Generals Jimmy Doolittle and Donald L. Putt, convinced Air Force Chief of Staff General Hoyt S. Vandenberg to put the R&D mission on a more equal footing with the operational Air Force. Accordingly, and in the face of intense Air Staff opposition, on 23 January 1950, the Research and Development Command (RDC) came into being. Established at Washington D.C., with an initial assignment of 20 officers, 5 airmen, and 20 civilians, Major General David M. Schlatter was appointed as its first commander. The command's name was changed to Air Research and Development Command (ARDC) on 16 September 1950.

The original transition plan called for ARDC to gradually assume Air Materiel Command's research and development responsibilities, but the transfer process proved to be much more difficult than planned. ARDC leadership favoured a "one-time, one-date," assumption of all research and development activities while AMC preferred the gradual transfer as originally planned. Also ARDC and AMC could not agree on where development ended and production began. General Vandenberg settled the disputes by issuing a 28 March 1951 directive, calling for the immediate activation of ARDC as an "independent Air Force Command, effective 2 April 1951." General Vandenberg directed the transfer to ARDC of Edwards, Holloman, and Griffiss Air Force Bases; the Cambridge, Watson, Climatic Project Laboratories, and the Upper Air Research Station. The Air Force Flight Test Center and Air Force Missile Test Center also joined the new command. The former Watson laboratory, relocated to Griffiss AFB, soon became the Rome Air Development Center.

HQ USAF established the Air Development Force at Wright-Patt AFB in April 1951. As part of ARDC, the Wright Air Development Center (WADC) was formed at Wright-Patterson AFB. WADC conglomerated four elements extracted from Air Material Command: Engineering, flight test, all-weather flying, and air research. WADC was reorganized and renamed the Wright Air Development Division (WADD) in 1959 until it became the Aeronautical Systems Division under AFSC two years later. The Arnold Engineering Development Center was dedicated by President Harry S. Truman on 25 June 1951.

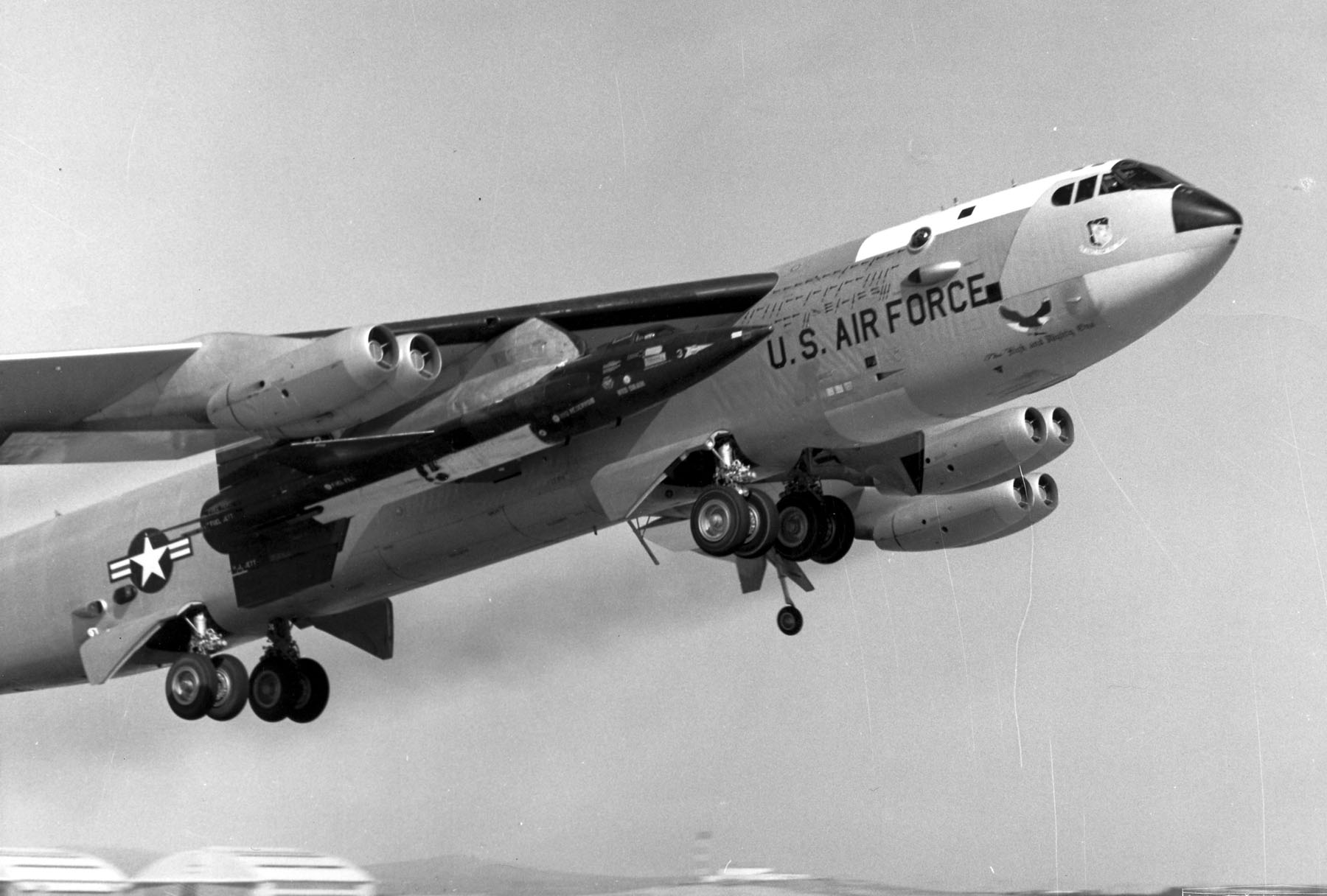
Boeing B-52B Stratofortress carrying the North American X-15 Rocket Plane taking off from Edwards AFB, California

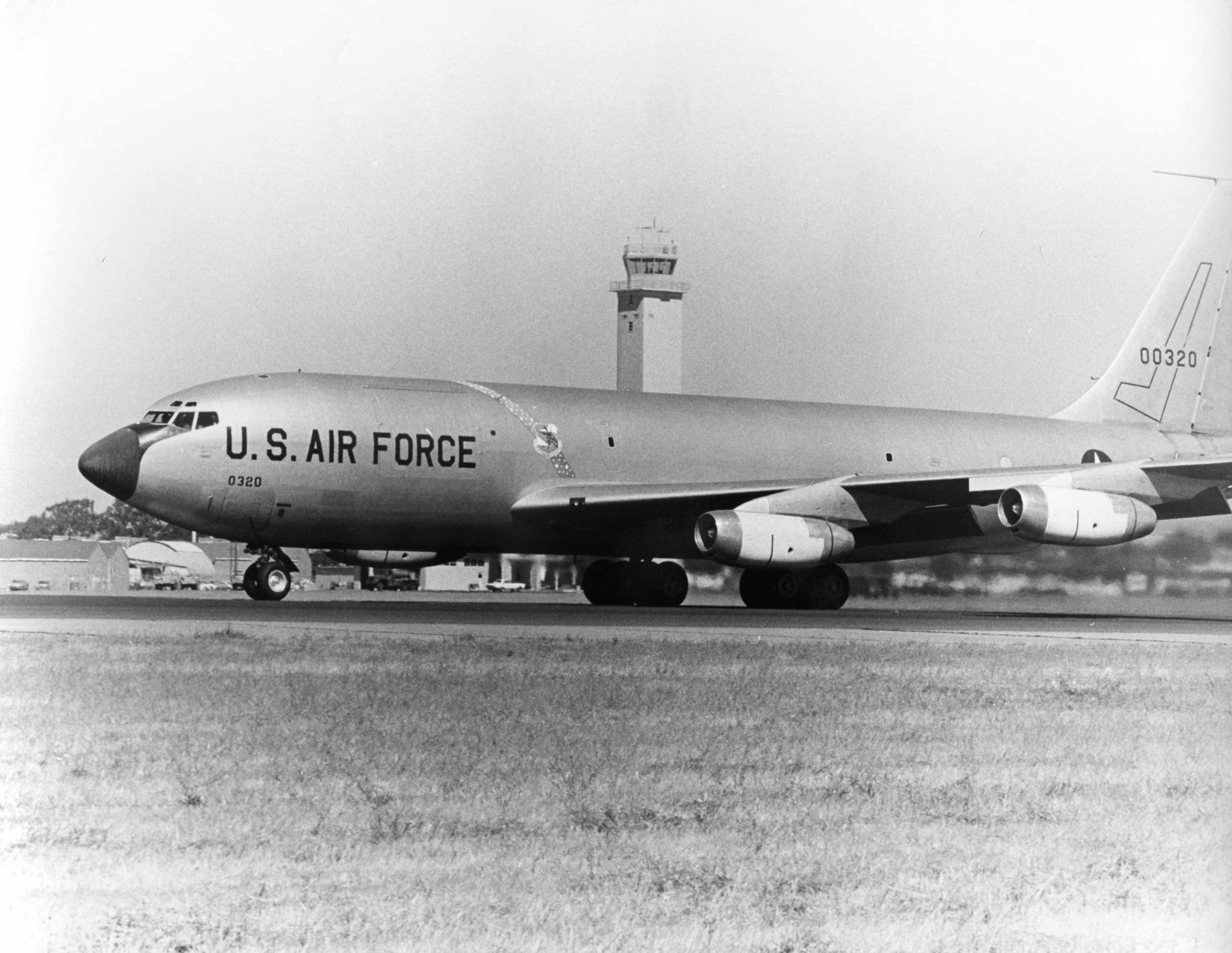
The Boeing KC-135 Stratotanker, the first jet-powered refueling tanker aircraft which was developed to replace the aging Boeing KC-97 Stratofreighter tanker aircraft.

During the 1950s, ARDC began to make its mark, developing many ambitious aircraft and missile prototypes. Among the successes of this period were the North American F-86 Sabre swept wing fighter, the Boeing B-52 Stratofortress intercontinental bomber, the Boeing KC-135 Stratotanker jet-powered refueling tanker aircraft, the Lockheed C-130 Hercules turboprop transport and the Lockheed U-2 very high-altitude strategic reconnaissance aircraft.

In 1949 a Human Resources Research Center was established at Lackland Air Force Base, which developed classification and other tests, focusing on ways to improve personal effectiveness. However, some of these functions were under Air Training Command, while others fell under ARDC, while the School of Aerospace Medicine was now part of Air University.

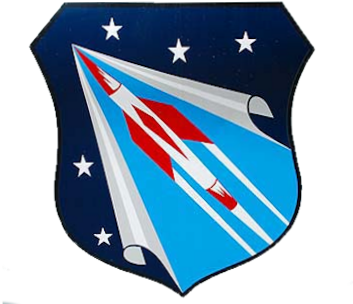
The Western Development Division and Air Force Ballistic Missile Division were part of Air Research and Development Command from 1954 until 1961.

=== Satellite and missile development ===
The German Army's employment of the V-2 rocket had demonstrated the viability of ballistic missiles during the Second World War. The United States Army Air Forces began developing U.S. ballistic missiles immediately after the end of the war. However, initial efforts to combine ballistic missiles and nuclear weapons was technologically infeasible until the development of thermonuclear weapons. In the early 1950s, the Soviet Union outpaced the United States in ballistic missile development, leading to the convening of the Teapot Committee to determine why the United States was struggling.

In accordance with the Teapot Committee's recommendations, Air Research and Development Command established the Western Development Division (WDD) at Los Angeles Air Force Station under Brigadier General Bernard Schriever on 1 July 1954. The Western Development Division's first program was the Convair SM-65 Atlas intercontinental ballistic missile, however by 1955 it initiated development of the Martin HGM-25A Titan I ICBM and Douglas PGM-17 Thor intermediate range ballistic missile.

In October 1955, the Western Development Division gained responsibility for spacecraft development when the Weapon System 117L satellite (nicknamed PIED PIPER), intended to conduct reconnaissance and missile warning, was transferred from the Wright Air Development Center. WS-117L formed the basis of the Samos and CORONA satellites. Brigadier General Bernard Schriever, Commander, WDD, was instructed to prepare a system development plan for WS-117L. On 1 June 1957, the Western Development Division was renamed the Air Force Ballistic Missile Division.

The Weapon System 117L program, initially intending to perform a variety of task under different sub-systems, was broken into three different programs in 1959. The Discoverer Program, better known as Corona, was a photographic reconnaissance satellite that ejected film for recovery in-atmosphere. The Discoverers were launched using a Thor-Agena booster, with Discoverer 1 becoming the first satellite to enter a polar orbit and Discoverer 2 was the first to have three-axis stabilization. In 1960, Discoverer 13 was the first to return a capsule when it crashed into the Pacific Ocean and Discoverer 14 marked the first successful return of film when it was recovered in-air by a 6593d Test Squadron Fairchild JC-119 Flying Boxcar. The Satellite and Missile Observation Program (SAMOS), was intended as a heavier counterpart to Discoverer and used the Atlas-Agena booster. SAMOS was intended to collect photographic and electromagnetic reconnaissance data, but instead of returning film capsules to earth, SAMOS would electronically transmit the data to ground stations. However, the technology for electro-optical film readout was not mature and it was canceled by Undersecretary of the Air Force Joseph V. Charyk. The Missile Defense Alarm System (MIDAS) was the third program derived from WS 117L and focused on providing missile warning of ICBMs using infrared sensors. Initial plans called for a constellation of eight spacecraft in polar orbits to monitor the Soviet Union, however due to early satellite failures it remained a test program until 1968.

To control these satellites, in 1958 the Air Force Ballistic Missile Division established an interim satellite control facility at Lockheed Missile and Space Division. On 6 April 1959, the 6594th Test Wing was established to operate the facility and on 1 March 1960 it transferred operations to Sunnyvale Air Force Station in California. It also established a global Air Force Satellite Control Network. On 16 November 1959, the 6592nd Support Group was established to manage Los Angeles Air Force Station.

The first space missions launched by the Air Force Ballistic Missile Division were not DOD, but the scientific Pioneer lunar probes. First directed by the Advanced Research Projects Agency, they were later turned over to NASA. The Thor-Able rocket was specifically developed by the Air Force Ballistic Missile Agency for these lunar missions, which aimed to enhance scientific knowledge and American global prestige during the Cold War. ARPA assigned the Air Force Ballistic Missile Division responsibility for three probes to be launched with the Thor-Able, the Army Ballistic Missile Agency two probes to be launched with the Juno II, and the Naval Ordnance Test Station to provide the imaging system. Pioneer 0, Pioneer 1, and Pioneer 2 were the Air Force Ballistic Missile Division's lunar probes. While Pioneer 0 and Pioneer 2 suffered launch failures and Pioneer 1 only travelled a third of the way to the Moon, it was the world's first deep space probe and provided information on the extent of the Van Allen radiation belts.

The command played a major contribution in the development of Intercontinental ballistic missiles (ICBMs). The first detonation of a thermonuclear (hydrogen) bomb was the "George" test of Operation Greenhouse by the United States on 9 May 1951. In response, the Soviet Union raced to reduce their vulnerability, detonating a thermonuclear device on 23 August 1953. A crash program was begun to develop the first U.S. ICBM, the SM-65 Atlas. The Atlas became operational in 1959. In terms of importance, resources, and success, the ICBM program was rivalled only by the famed Manhattan Project of World War II.

On 20 September 1957, the Air Force Ballistic Missile Division conducted the first launch of a Thor missile from Cape Canaveral Air Force Station, Florida, and on 17 December that year, the first launch of an Atlas missile. By 1959, the PGM-17 Thor IRBM was deployed to the United Kingdom and turned over to RAF Bomber Command for operational service. This effort, Project Emily, saw RAF missile squadrons reforming for operational service from the first half of 1959. The SM-65 Atlas ICBM was turned over SAC by the end of 1962. In 1960, the HGM-25A Titan I ICBM made its first flight and was turned over to Strategic Air Command in 1962, completing the deployment of the first-generation ballistic missiles.

These first-generation ballistic missiles also served as the foundation for the first-generation of space launch vehicles. The first space launch vehicle developed by the Air Force Ballistic Missile Division was the Thor-Able, which used a Thor IRBM as the first stage and a Vanguard-derived Able. Its first launch was on 11 October 1958. The first satellite launched by the Air Force Ballistic Missile Division was the Army Signal Corps SCORE using an Atlas B. The Thor and Atlas rocket families would form the core of the United States' space launch fleet. Following its 1958 establishment, NASA immediately began using the Thor for space launches and in 1959 developed the Thor-Delta. The Atlas was adopted by NASA in 1959 and Project Mercury used the Atlas LV-3B for its orbital flights, with the Army's Mercury-Redstone Launch Vehicle used only for sub-orbital flights.

=== Computing, Atlas, and AF Systems Command ===
AIMACO, the "Supply Control Command compiler" for Air Materiel Command, began circa 1959 with the definition of a high level programming language influenced by the UNIVAC Flow-Matic and COMTRAN programming languages. The draft AIMACO language definition was developed by an AMC-chaired committee of industry representatives from IBM, United States Steel, and AMC Programming Services. AIMACO had two compilers specified/designed (never produced), and AMC originally intended all programming for AMC systems would be in AIMACO and compiled on a UNIVAC at the AMC headquarters at Wright-Patterson AFB for operation on UNIVAC or IBM computers. An alternative compiler was designed by AMC Programming Services to compile systems on IBM computers for operation on IBM computers. AIMACO, along with FLOW-MATIC and COMTRAN, influenced development of the COBOL programming language.

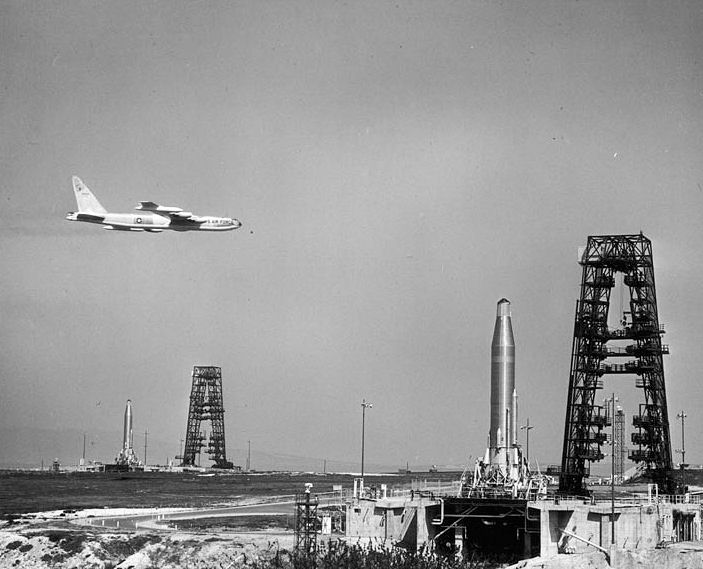
Atlas missiles on alert at Vandenberg Air Force Base – 1960

The Atlas program led to the belief that the entire responsibility for deploying new weapons systems – from research, development and testing through procurement and production – should be vested in one command, rather than split between Air Materiel Command (AMC) and ARDC. It was the Soviet Union's launch of Sputnik 1 in October 1957 that greatly influenced HQ USAF and ARDC thinking. ARDC's Air Defense Systems Management Office was redesignated as the Air Defense Systems Integration Division on February 24, 1958. The Stever Report, completed in June 1958, which proposed a new Air Force command for weapons acquisition. With this report and a realization of DoD's desire to assign the military space mission to the Air Force, the Air Force won the approval of Secretary of Defense Robert S. McNamara in 1961 for a new major command.

On Oct 5-6 1959, an ARDC reorganization was announced. The command was to include Air Force Research Division and three field organizations: Air Force Ballistic Missile Division (AFBMD), the Wright Air Development Division (WADD), and the Air Force Command And Control Development Division (AFCCDD), their designations indicating function rather than location. The final disposition of ADSID was not yet determined.

In the reorganization of 1961, Air Materiel Command was re-designated Air Force Logistics Command (AFLC) while Air Research and Development Command, gaining responsibility for weapon system acquisition, was re-designated Air Force Systems Command (AFSC) under General Bernard Schriever. It was to be responsible for "all research, development and acquisition of aerospace and missile systems. With the inactivation of the Air Materiel Command, a new Logistics Command was established to handle maintenance and supply only. To carry out this challenging assignment, AFSC was to have four subordinate divisions: the Electronic Systems Division, the Aeronautical Systems Division, a Ballistic Missile Division, and a Space Systems Division. The new arrangement separated missile and space management, as General Schriever had favored for the past two years. The new Space Systems Division would be formed at the Los Angeles site from elements of ARDC's Ballistic Missile Division and AMC's Ballistic Missiles Center. The Ballistic Missile Division, also including elements from ARDC's Ballistic Missile Division and AMC's Ballistic Missiles Center as well as the Army Corps of Engineers' Ballistic Missile Construction Office, would relocate to Norton Air Force Base. An additional measure involved establishment of an Office ofAerospace Research (OAR) on the Air Staff for basic research elements."

The Ballistic Missile Division was to continue the work of the Air Force Ballistic Missile Division on second-generation ballistic missiles. The first major missile system it worked on was the LGM-25C Titan II ICBM, which was an improvement over the LGM-25A Titan I. The Titan II had storable propellent, an all-inertial guidance system, and could be launched from underground missile silos. The first Titan IIs went on alert with Strategic Air Command in June 1963. The BMD also began development of the LGM-30 Minuteman ICBM, which was the first Air Force ballistic missile to use solid fuel rather than liquid fuel. The first Minuteman I was launched by the Air Force Ballistic Missile Division on 1 February 1962 and turned over to Strategic Air Command on 11 September 1962. By 1965, the Minuteman I had replaced the Atlas and Titan I ICBMs.

The Space Systems Division provided close support to NASA's Project Mercury, providing three of the Mercury Seven astronauts, launch facilities (Cape Canaveral Launch Complex 5 and 14), RM-90 Blue Scout II and Atlas LV-3B launch vehicles, and recovery forces. The Space Systems Division was planning to provide similar support to Project Gemini and was supporting 14 NASA programs with 96 research and development officers attached. In April 1962, the position of deputy to the commander of Air Force Systems Command for Manned Space Flight was established at NASA Headquarters, consisting of personnel from all three services.

Under the Kennedy Administration, Secretary McNamara instituted greater centralization in acquisition, though measures such as the Total Package Procurement concept (TPP). This system shifted many major program management functions to the Pentagon. Stressing computer modeling, concurrency, and paper competitions among the contractors, TPP sharply curtailed the flexibility of Systems Command program managers. Cost overruns and serious technical difficulties in such TPP programs as the Lockheed C-5 Galaxy and General Dynamics F-111 Aardvark lead to drastic changes in DoD acquisition practices. In 1970, Deputy Secretary of Defense David Packard revised many McNamara policies. He decentralized the acquisition system and reemphasized prototyping in weapons development.

=== Vietnam era and aftermath ===
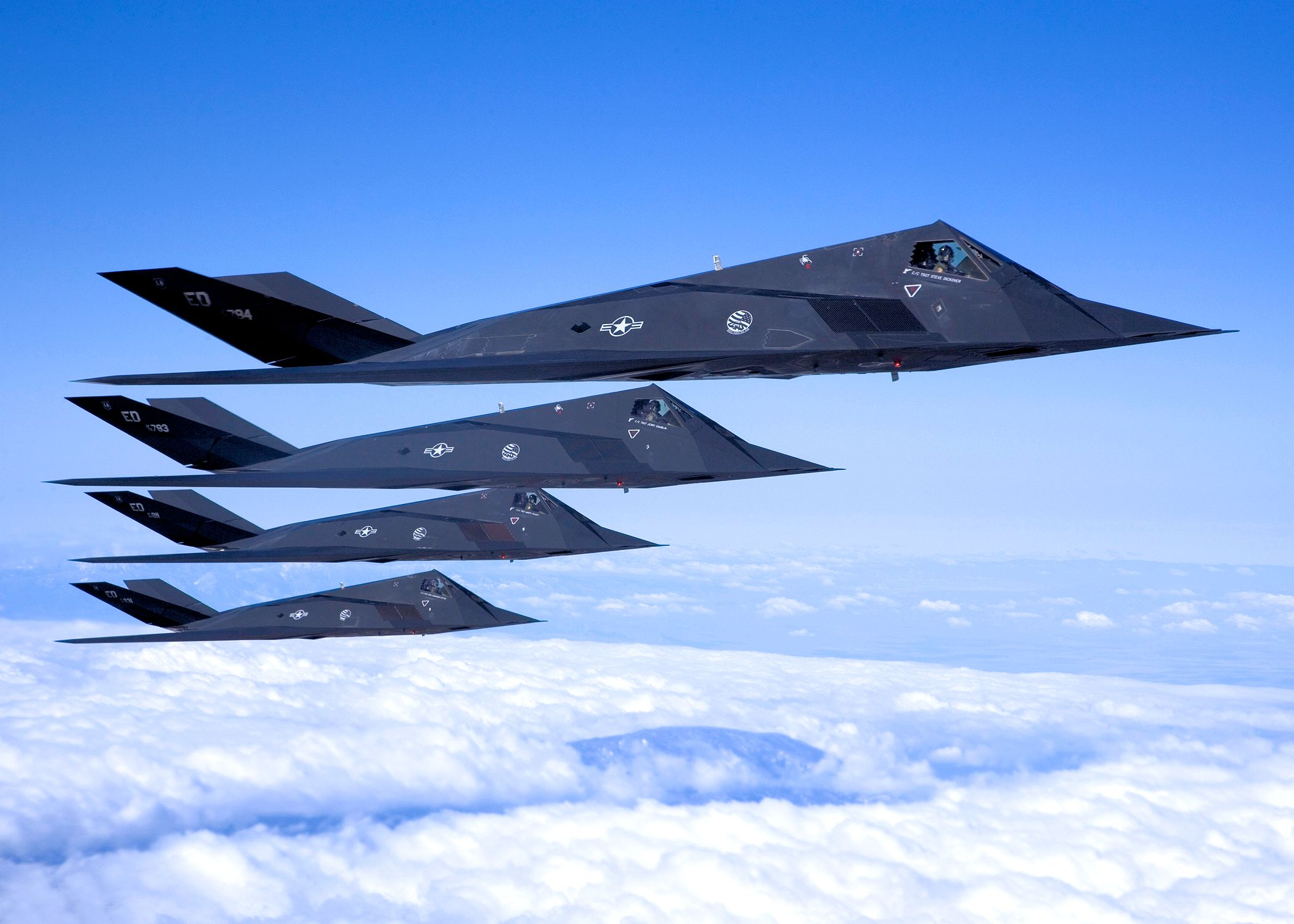
F-117 Nighthawk stealth fighters

As the Vietnam War dominated the late 1960s and early 1970s, AFSC focused on quick solutions to the needs of operational units in the war zone. Areas such as Electronic warfare (ECM) (Douglas EB-66 Destroyer) were greatly expanded in response to Vietnam People's Air Force surface-to-air missile (SAM) systems. The modification of transports (AC-130 Hercules, AC-119 Flying Boxcar) into gunships, improved reconnaissance sensors, the Defense Meteorological Satellite Program, Forward Looking Infrared Sensors (FLIR), and Precision-guided munitions all represented significant AFSC contributions to Vietnam air operations.

The sustained growth of Soviet power after the Cuban Missile Crisis challenged the entire spectrum of U.S. military capabilities. These factors led to a new wave of Air Force weapons development beginning in the late 1960s. Systems Command found itself managing a broad array of new tactical and strategic programs including the McDonnell Douglas F-15 Eagle, General Dynamics F-16 Fighting Falcon fighters, the Fairchild Republic A-10 Thunderbolt II ground support aircraft, the LGM-118 Peacekeeper, the AGM-86 ALCM (air) and BGM-109 (ground) cruise missiles, the Boeing E-3 Sentry Airborne Warning and Control System, the Boeing C-17 Globemaster III transport, the Rockwell B-1 Lancer bomber, and a new generation of orbiting Reconnaissance satellites. These programs were the main activities of AFSC during the 1970s.

With the Reagan Administration's military buildup during the 1980s, the pace and scope of Air Force acquisition again escalated. Now the focus centered on the modernization of strategic systems which had atrophied during the Vietnam era and afterward. But increased activity and defense spending brought acquisition reform issues to the forefront. Cost, schedule, and quality problems troubled some major weapons programs. Media stories about spare parts overpricing and questionable contractor overhead charges created a national sensation. This negative publicity, coupled with soaring federal deficits and reductions in domestic spending, contributed by the middle of the decade to a political backlash against Ronald Reagan's military programs. The situation gave enormous political impetus to reductions of defense spending and an overhaul of the nation's military establishment, including its weapons acquisition practices. AFSC led the way for acquisition improvements with greater reliance on multi-year contracting to stabilize weapons programs and increased investment in modernization programs for the defense industrial base. On 26 April 1984 the vice-commander of AFSC, Lieutenant General Robert M. Bond, was killed during a retirement visit to the 6513th Test Squadron at Groom Lake while flying a Mikoyan-Gurevich MiG-23 at over Mach 2.

During this turbulent period, new and updated weapons systems continued to join the USAF. The B-1B Lancer was delivered to SAC in record time, though with significant problems that would hamper its service career for some time. Stealth technology found its way to the ramps in the form of the F-117 Nighthawk fighter-bomber and the B-2 Spirit bomber. After the Space Shuttle Challenger disaster, AFSC helped restore US space launch capability by quickly making available a family of new expendable launch vehicles such as the Delta II. Major gains were made in operational readiness rates through the Reliability and Maintainability (R&M) 2000 program.

=== Inactivation ===
With the 1992 reorganization of the Air Force, the functions of AFSC and Air Force Logistics Command (AFLC) were once again merged into the new Air Force Materiel Command (AFMC).

== Lineage ==
- Established as Research and Development Command on 23 January 1950

Organized as a major command on 1 February 1950
Re-designated: Air Research and Development Command on 16 September 1950
Re-designated: Air Force Systems Command on 1 April 1961
Inactivated on 1 July 1992.

=== Assignments ===
- Air Materiel Command, 23 January 1950
- United States Air Force, 1 February 1950 – 1 July 1992

=== Stations ===
- Baltimore, Maryland, 23 January 1950
- Andrews Air Force Base, Maryland, 24 January 1958 – 1 July 1992.

=== Command bases and major units ===
- Brooks AFB, Texas, 1 November 1961 – 1 July 1992

USAF Aerospace Medical Center
Museum of Flight Medicine
USAF Human Resources Laboratory
USAF Medical Service Center

- Edwards AFB, California, 2 April 1951 – 1 July 1992

USAF Flight Test Center
USAF Test Pilot School
USAF Rocket Propulsion Laboratory
412th Test Wing

- Eglin AFB, Florida, 1 December 1957 – 1 July 1992

USAF Armament Development Test Center
3246th Test Wing

- Griffiss AFB, New York, 2 April 1951 – 1 July 1954

Rome Air Development Center

- Los Angeles Air Force Station, California

Space Systems Division

- Norton AFB, California

Ballistic Missile Office / Division / Organization (from 1979)

- Vandenberg AFB, California, 21 June 1957 – 1 January 1958

1st Strategic Aerospace Division

- Hickam AFB, Hawaii

6594th Test Group - satellite photo recovery

- Hanscom AFB, Massachusetts, 1 August 1951 – 1 July 1992

USAF Cambridge Research Center
USAF Command and Control Development Division
USAF Geophysics Laboratory
Electronic Systems Division
USAF Computer Acquisition Center

- Holloman AFB, New Mexico, 2 April 1951 – 1 January 1971

USAF Missile Development Center

- Kirtland AFB, New Mexico, 1 April 1952 – 1 July 1977

USAF Special Weapons Center
USAF Research Laboratory
4900th Air Base Wing
4925th Test Group

- Patrick AFB, Florida, 14 May 1951 – 1 October 1991
  - Includes Cape Canaveral Air Force Station, Florida

Air Force Eastern Test Range
6555th Aerospace Test Group
Eastern Space and Missile Center

== Commanders of Air Force Systems Command ==
No.	Image	Name	Tenure	Notes
1		Gen. Bernard A. Schriever	1961–1966	Often considered originator and driver of the U.S. military space program.
2		Gen. James Ferguson	1966–1970	
3		Gen. George S. Brown	1970–1973	Commander, Seventh Air Force, 1968–1970.; Chief of Staff of the United States Air Force (CSAF), 1973–1974.; Chairman of the Joint Chiefs of Staff (CJCS), 1974–1978.
4		Gen. Samuel C. Phillips	1973–1975	Director of NASA's Apollo Human Lunar Landing Program, 1964 - 1969.; Commander of the Space and Missile Systems Organization (SAMSO), 1969 - 1972.; Director of the National Security Agency (DIRNSA), 1972–1973.
5		Gen. William J. Evans	1975–1977	Commander in Chief, U.S. Air Forces in Europe (CINCUSAFE), 1977–1978.
6		Gen. Lew Allen	1977–1978	Vice Chief of Staff, U.S. Air Force (VCSAF), 1978.; Chief of Staff, U.S. Air Force (CSAF), 1978–1982.
7		Gen. Alton D. Slay	1978–1981	
8		Gen. Robert T. Marsh	1981–1984	
9		Gen. Lawrence A. Skantze	1984–1987	
10		Gen. Bernard P. Randolph	1987–1990	
11		Gen. Ronald W. Yates	1990–1992	Commander, Air Force Materiel Command (COMAFMC), 1992–1995.
