= Bernard P. Randolph =

United States Air Force general (1933–2021)

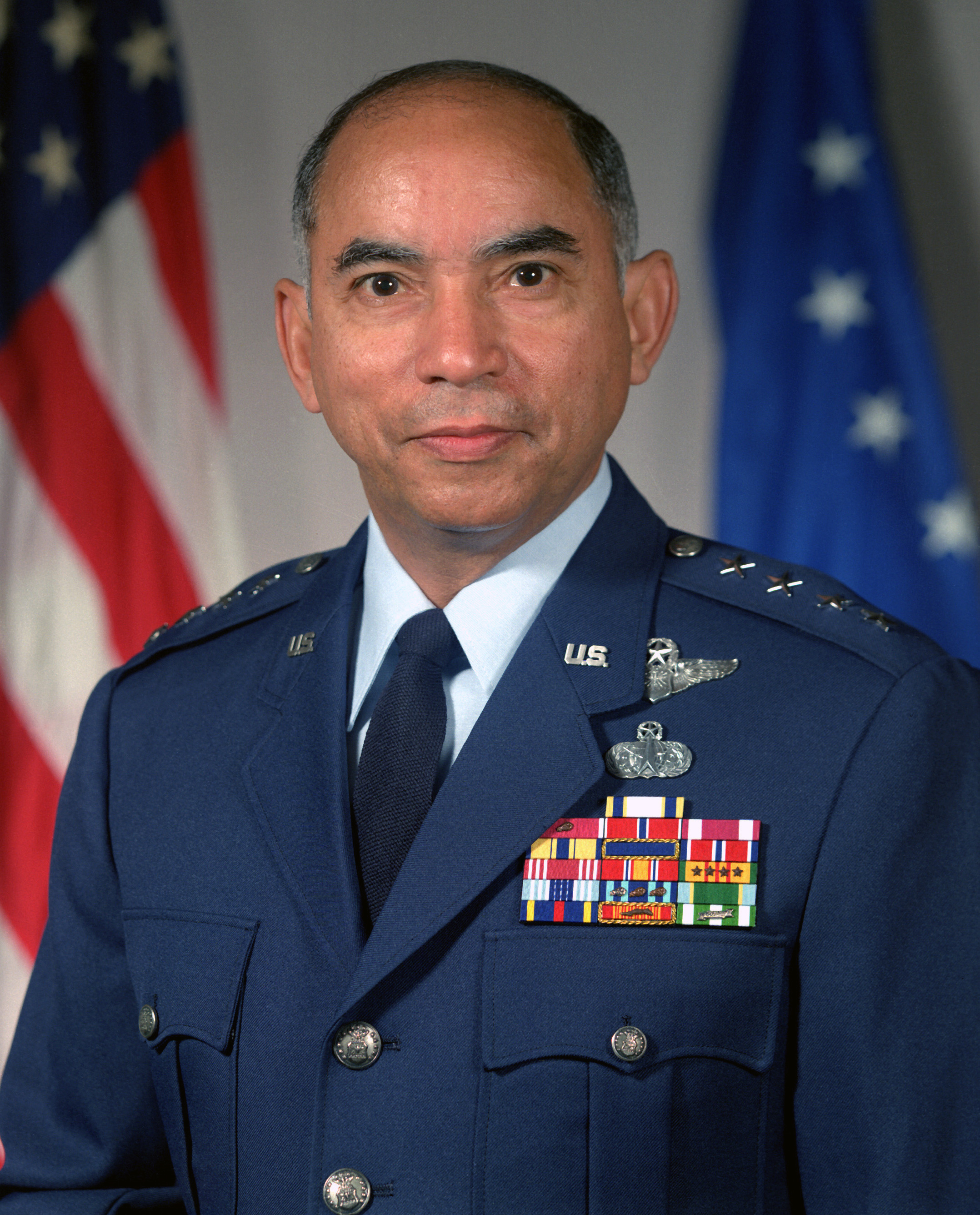
- Born: July 10, 1933; New Orleans, Louisiana, U.S.
- Died: January 4, 2021 (aged 87); San Antonio, Texas, U.S.
- Military career
- Allegiance: United States of America
- Branch: United States Air Force
- Service years: 1956–1990
- Rank: General
- Nickname: Randy
- Commands: Air Force Systems Command
- Conflicts: Vietnam War
- Awards: Distinguished Service Medal; Legion of Merit (2); Bronze Star

Bernard Peter Randolph (July 10, 1933 – January 4, 2021) was a United States Air Force General who served as the Commander of Air Force Systems Command (COMAFSC) from 1987 to 1990.

== Early life and education ==
Randolph was born in 1933, in New Orleans. He received a Bachelor of Science degree in chemistry from Xavier University of Louisiana in 1954. He earned bachelor (magna cum laude) and Master of Science degrees in electrical engineering from the University of North Dakota through the Air Force Institute of Technology program in 1964 and 1965, respectively. He completed Squadron Officer School in 1959, and Air Command and Staff College as a distinguished graduate in 1969, concurrently earning a master's degree in business administration from Auburn University. He was a distinguished graduate of the Air War College in 1974.

== Military career ==
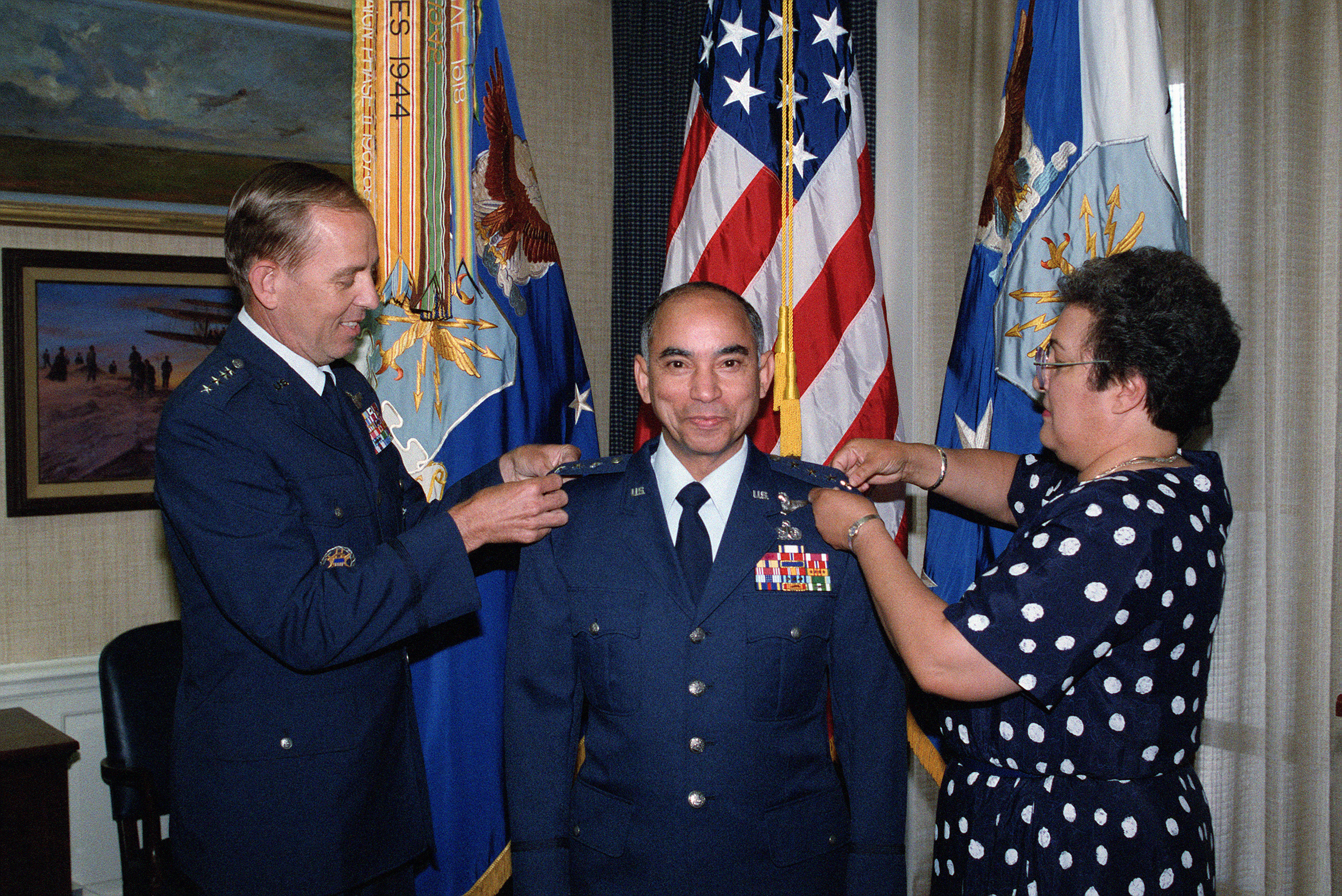
General Bernard P. Randolph is pinned with his fourth star on July 17, 1988.

His first assignment after completing aviation cadet training and undergraduate navigator training (UNT) at Ellington Air Force Base, Texas, and Mather Air Force Base, California, was with the 98th Bomb Wing and the 307th Bomb Wing of the Strategic Air Command (SAC) at Lincoln Air Force Base, Nebraska, from June 1956 to June 1962. At Lincoln AFB, he instructed and evaluated KC-97 Stratofreighter and B-47 Stratojet flightcrews and while there, he was also a member of a select combat crew.

Randolph then attended graduate school at the University of North Dakota until July 1965 and then was assigned to Los Angeles Air Force Station, California, as Chief, On-orbit Operations, Space Systems Division. He next was assigned as Assistant Deputy Program Director for Launch and Orbital Operations, and was responsible for all payload operations.

From August 1968 to October 1969, Randolph concurrently attended Air Command and Staff College at Maxwell AFB and pursued another master's degree via Auburn University's Montgomery, Alabama campus. He then was assigned to the Republic of Vietnam as an airlift operations officer at Chu Lai and airlift coordinator at Tan Son Nhut Air Base. In this capacity, he was responsible for the total operation of about 50 C-7 and C-123 airlift sorties daily from Chu Lai and later coordinated the operations of all airlift control elements throughout the Republic of Vietnam.

Upon his return to the United States in November 1970, General Randolph was assigned to Air Force Systems Command headquarters as chief of command plans in test evaluation, and then as the executive officer to the deputy chief of staff for operations.

Randolph attended Air War College from August 1973 to June 1974. Upon graduation, he returned to Los Angeles Air Force Station as director, space systems planning, for the Space and Missile Systems Organization. In April 1975, he became deputy program director and, later, program director for the Air Force Satellite Communications System. He assumed responsibility for space defense systems at Space Division headquarters, Los Angeles Air Force Station, in March 1978. In this capacity he managed a program to design and develop the U.S. anti-satellite system with its supporting surveillance, command and control, and survivability aspects.

From July 1980 to September 1981, the general served as vice commander of the Warner Robins Air Logistics Center, Robins Air Force Base, Georgia. He then became director of space systems and command, control and communications, Office of the Deputy Chief of Staff, Research, Development and Acquisition, Headquarters U.S. Air Force, Washington, D.C. General Randolph returned again to Los Angeles Air Force Station as vice commander and deputy commander for Space Systems Acquisition for Space Division in May 1983. In June 1984 he became vice commander of Air Force Systems Command. He returned to Air Force headquarters in May 1985 and served as deputy chief of staff for research, development and acquisition. He assumed his final command as commander, Air Force Systems Command, in July 1987.

Randolph was the second African American to be promoted to 4-star rank in the Air Force and, as a master navigator, was the first USAF navigator to achieve 4-star rank and to command an Air Force Major command (MAJCOM). He retired from active duty on March 31, 1990.

In 2010, Randolph was inducted into the University of North Dakota Engineering Alumni Academy.

== Death ==
Randolph died of complications from COVID-19 on January 4, 2021, during the COVID-19 pandemic in Texas.

== Awards ==
General Randolph's military decorations and awards include the Distinguished Service Medal, Legion of Merit with oak leaf cluster, Bronze Star, Meritorious Service Medal, Air Force Commendation Medal and AF Presidential Unit Citation.

- Air Force Distinguished Service Medal
- Legion of Merit
- Bronze Star
- Meritorious Service Medal
- Air Force Commendation Medal
- Air Force Presidential Unit Citation

== Effective dates of promotion ==
| Insignia | Rank | Date |
|---|---|---|
| | General | August 1, 1987 |
| | Lieutenant general | June 28, 1984 |
| | Major general | November 1, 1982 |
| | Brigadier general | September 8, 1980 |
| | Colonel | July 1, 1975 |
| | Lieutenant colonel | April 1, 1971 |
| | Major | January 20, 1967 |
| | Captain | February 5, 1960 |
| | First lieutenant | May 9, 1957 |
| | Second lieutenant | November 9, 1955 |

== Links ==
- Official Biography
