= 6594th Test Group =

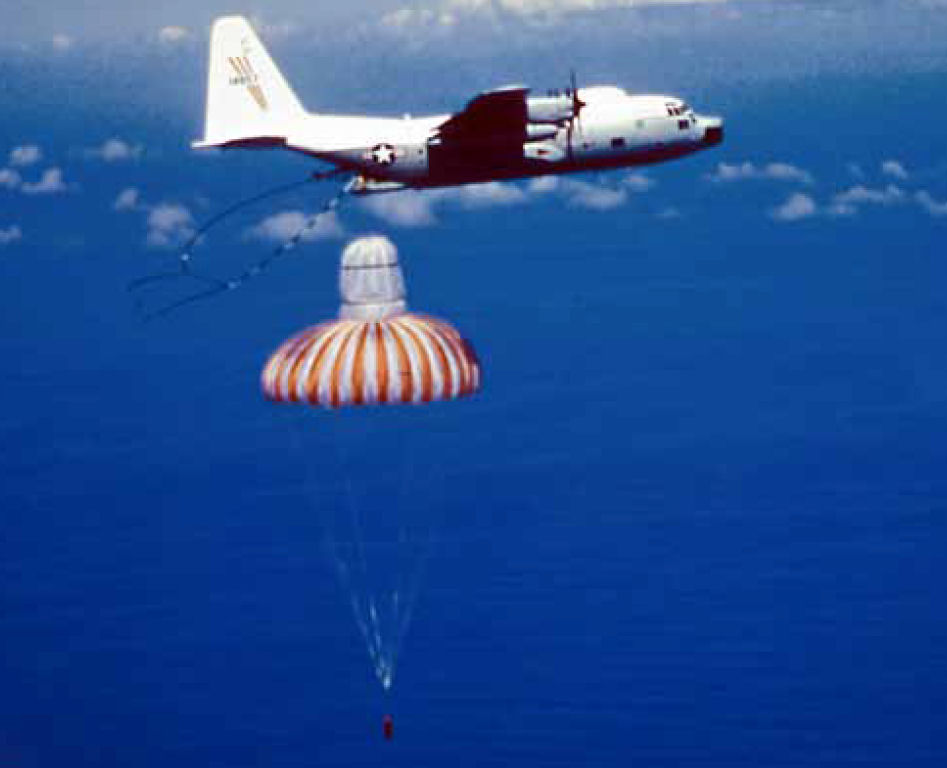
- 6953d Test Squadron - Lockheed JC-130B about to recover the white cone (or conical extension) of a Mark 8 parachute, 1963.
- Active: 1959–1986
- Country: United States
- Branch: United States Air Force
- Role: Satellite recovery operations
- Motto: "Catch a Falling Star"

Insignia
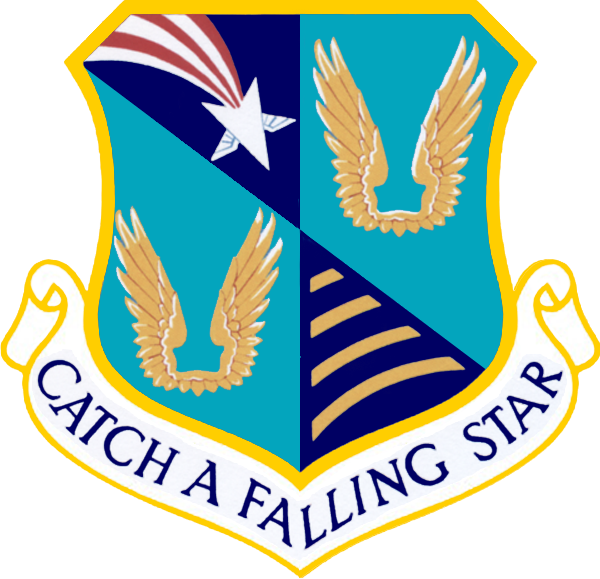
- 6594th Test Group emblem

The 6594th Test Group was a United States Air Force Unit stationed in Hawaii at Hickam Air Force Base from 1958 until it was inactivated in 1986.

== History ==
The 6594th Test Group was established in 1958 to support Air Force Systems Command missile and space development operations in the Western Pacific area. It also provided support to the United States Coast Guard and Honolulu Joint Rescue Coordination Center on an as-available, non-interference basis.

Large portions of the test group's mission were classified until 1995 when information concerning Project Corona was declassified. The 6594th was largely concerned with retrieving film canisters, about the size of a garbage can, in midair that had been ejected from some of the United States' earliest reconnaissance satellites.

These canisters were among the first objects sent into space that were designed to survive re-entry. Upon entering the ionosphere, they could resemble a shooting, or falling, star. Thus, the unit's motto "Catch a Falling Star".

Because retrieval occurred over water in the Pacific, rescue swimmers were a standard part of the mission crew. Thus, when the 6594th was not busy with their primary mission, they were often available to support the US Coast Guard and other agencies in search and rescue missions. As well as satellite film capsules, the 6594th was also involved with the recovery of sounding rocket and missile nose cones during test flights. The 6594th Test Group had one of the best records for open water rescues in the U.S. Air Force.

== Personnel ==
At the time of its inactivation, the 6594th was staffed by 95 officers and 409 enlisted personnel and was supported by 16 US Civil Service personnel.

== 1985 helicopter crash ==
On 15 January 1985 a Sikorsky HH-53 Super Jolly helicopter, call sign Arris 01, from the 6594th Test Group crashed while attempting a shipboard rescue mission 544 miles northwest of Honolulu. All seven crew members were killed. The helicopter crashed when a main rotor blade broke creating an imbalance in the aircraft which caused the tail to break off while the helicopter hovered above the commercial ship, "Asian Beauty." A memorial plaque in honor of the seven crew members is located in the yard of the chapel at Hickam Field. For more information, see the publication of the Hickam Field annual reports.

== Lineage ==
- Designated as the 6594th Recovery Control Group and organized on 1 Nov 1959
- Redesignated 6594th Test Group on 10 Mar 1966
- Inactivated on 30 Sep 1986

=== Assignments ===
- 6594th Test Wing (later 6594th Aerospace Test Wing), 1 November 1959
- Air Force Satellite Control Facility, 1 July 1965-30 September 1986

=== Components ===
- 6593rd Instrumentation Squadron: 1 November 1959 – 1 October 1979
- 6593rd Test Squadron: 1 November 1959 – 1 July 1972

=== Stations ===
- Hickam Air Force Base, 1 November 1959 – 30 September 1986

=== Aircraft ===
At the time of inactivation, Test Group's aircraft complement consisted of:

- 7 Lockheed JC-130B
- 3 Lockheed JC-130H
- 5 Sikorsky HH-53C Super Jolly
- 3 Lockheed HC-130P

== See also ==
- Corona (satellite)
- Air Force Satellite Control Facility
