= Onizuka Air Force Station =

Military space communications and satellite testing site in Sunnyvale, California

- Sunnyvale, California in the United States
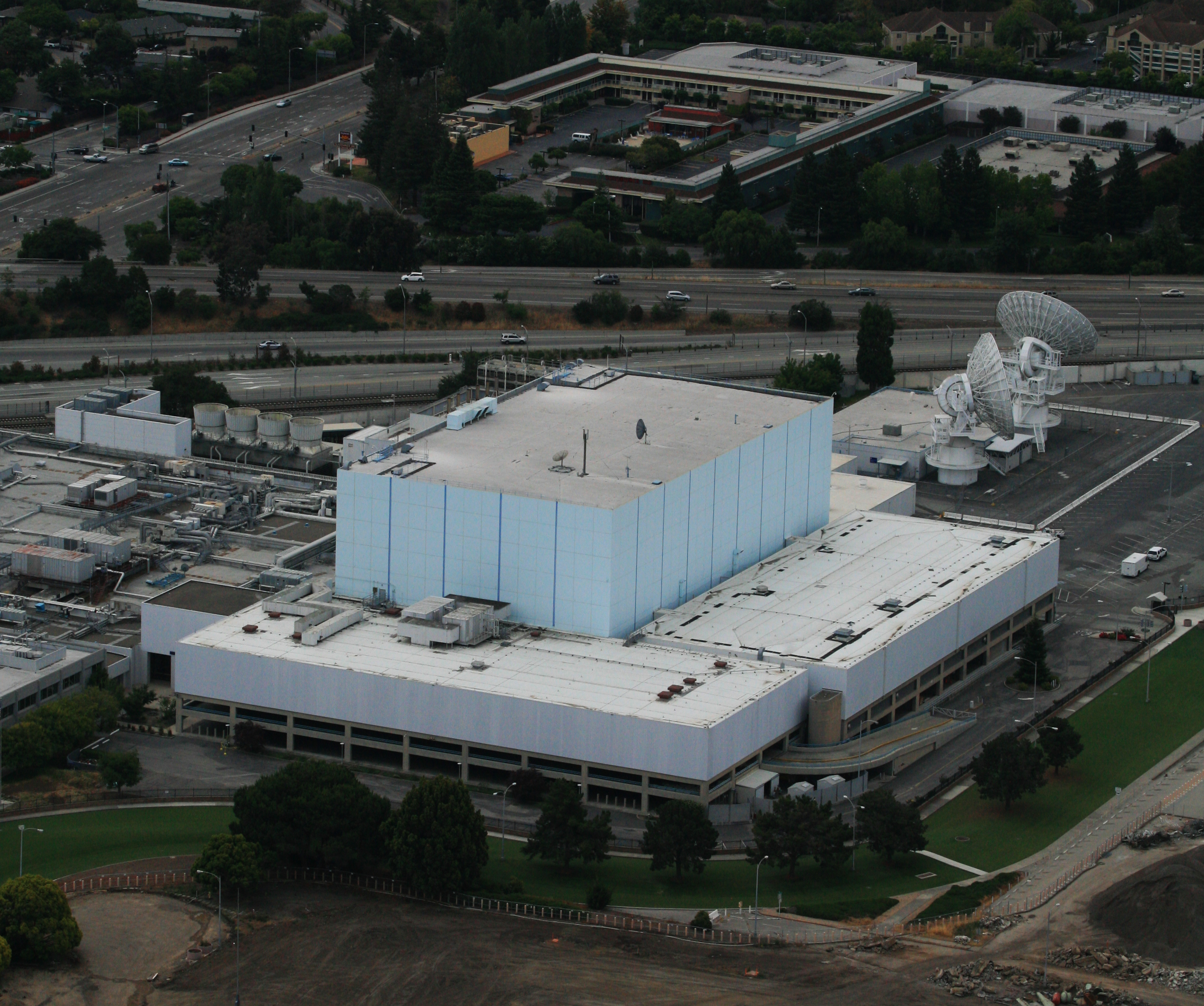
- Onizuka AFS in 2009

Site information
- Type: US Air Force station
- Owner: Department of Defense
- Operator: US Air Force
- Controlled by: Air Force Space Command
- Condition: Closed
- Website: Official website (archived)

Location
- Coordinates: 37°24′17.5″N 122°1′43.5″W

Site history
- Built: 1960 (as Sunnyvale AFS)
- In use: 1960 – 28 July 2010
- Fate: Demolished (2014)

Onizuka Air Force Station or Onizuka AFS was a US Air Force installation in Sunnyvale, California, at the intersection of State Route 237 and North Mathilda Avenue. It operated from 1960 to 2010.

One of its distinguishing feature was Building 1003, known locally as the Blue Cube and the "Cube" given its shape, color, and lack of windows. The station's other distinguishing features were its three primary parabolic antennas, used for communication with remote tracking stations used to control military satellites; these antennas were named Sun East, Sun West, and Sun 3.

== History ==
In the United States space program's formative stages, Air Force Systems Command (AFSC) contracted with the Philco Ford division of Ford Motor Company to provide interim operational facilities at its Palo Alto, California, location. Operation began in the late 1950s. By 1958, the US Air Force sought a permanent home, with larger facilities. Ultimately, the Air Force purchased from Lockheed Corporation about 19 acres (7.7 hectares) of land, which included Lockheed Building 100 and was named Sunnyvale Air Force Station. Construction of the station's original facilities was completed in 1960. More structures were built as operations expanded.

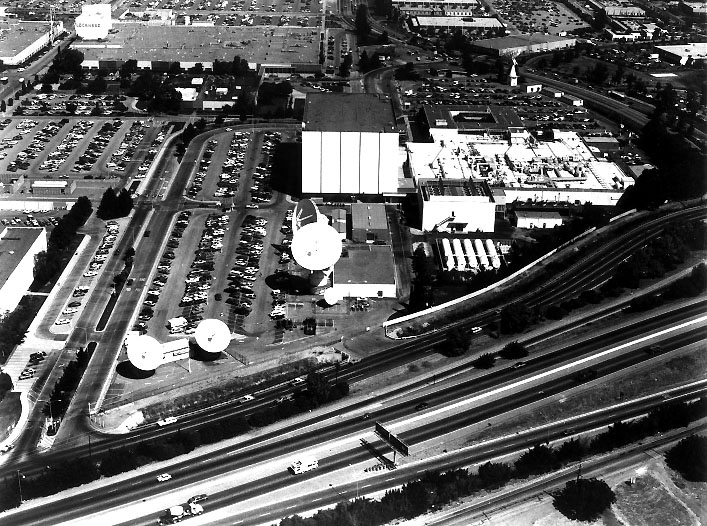
Aerial view of Sunnyvale AFS during the 1980s

The station was home to the AFSC operational unit known as the Air Force Satellite Test Center (STC, colloquially called the "stick"), and other non-AFSC operational organizations. By 1979, the Air Force Satellite Test Center was renamed the Air Force Satellite Control Facility.

In 1986 the base was renamed in honor of Air Force Lieutenant Colonel Ellison S. Onizuka, an astronaut who died in the Space Shuttle Challenger disaster on January 28, 1986.

Onizuka AFS and the Air Force Satellite Control Facility were transferred from Air Force Systems Command to Air Force Space Command and operated by the 21st Space Operations Squadron, a geographically separated unit (GSU) of the 50th Space Wing. The non-AFSC operational organizations remained under their respective commands.

== Closure ==
When the station was opened in 1960, the Sunnyvale area was rural and the station was predominantly surrounded by orchards. By the late 1970s, the region had become Silicon Valley and the station's physical security vulnerabilities became apparent. AFSC therefore planned the Consolidated Space Operations Center (CSOC), which would lie several miles east of Colorado Springs, Colorado, at the to-be-built Falcon Air Force Station (later renamed Schriever Air Force Base). Spacecraft operations would be split between the two locations and each location would serve as a backup to the other. To maintain this redundancy, when Onizuka AFS was selected for closure by the Base Realignment and Closure Commission, the Air Force determined to move Onizuka's remaining operational units to the new Ellison Onizuka Satellite Operations Facility at Vandenberg Air Force Base.

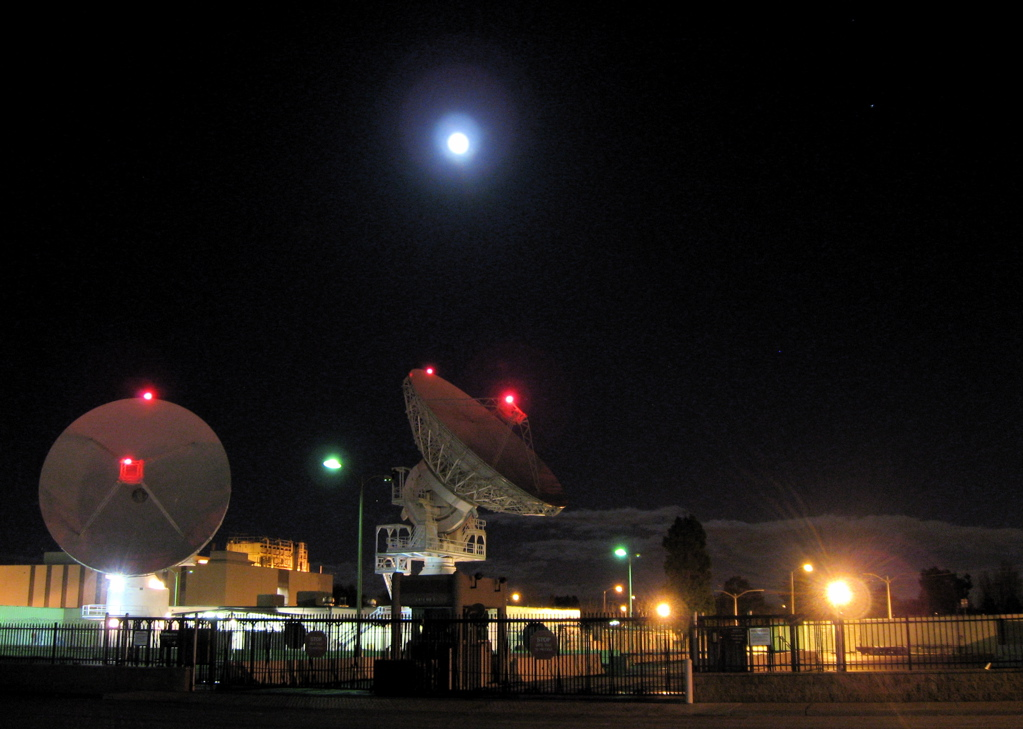
Satellite antenna at Onizuka AFS during 2007

Realignment of Onizuka Air Force Station was recommended and accepted as part of the 1995 round of the Base Realignment and Closure Program. The 750th Space Group was to be inactivated and its functions moved to Falcon AFS. Detachment 2 of the Space and Missile Systems Center would move to Falcon AFB and Kirtland AFB, New Mexico; some other, undisclosed tenants would stay in the existing facilities for some time. On May 13, 2005, Defense Secretary Donald Rumsfeld recommended closing the Onizuka Air Force Station in Sunnyvale as part of a fifth round of military base closures and re-sizing. The date by which the realignment and closure must be completed was September 15, 2011.

In April 2007, the mission of the National Reconnaissance Office at Onizuka AFS ended after 46 years.

Upon completion of this transition, Onizuka AFS was closed on 28 July 2010.

=== Demolition ===
In April 2014, demolition of the site began. 9 acres (3.6 hectares) of the land was earmarked for conversion to educational space operated by the Foothill–De Anza Community College District. 4.4 acres (1.8 hectares) of the land was to be used by the Department of Veterans Affairs. 1 acre (0.40 hectares) was added to Sunnyvale's existing Fire Station 5 and was subject to a land swap with a developer to relocate Fire Station 5, upgrade it to full service capabilities, and support a shooting range for public safety personnel training. The remaining 5 acres (2.0 hectares) parcel is now owned by the City of Sunnyvale for an unspecified future use.

== See also ==
- List of former United States Air Force installations
