= 77th Intelligence Wing =

United States Air Force unit

- Active: 1942–1943; 1953–2001; 2005–2010; 2025–present
- Country: United States
- Branch: United States Air Force
- Type: Wing
- Role: Military intelligence
- Part of: Air Force District of Washington
- Garrison/HQ: Joint Base Anacostia-Bolling, Washington, D.C.
- Motto: All seeing (1942–1943)
- Decorations: Air Force Outstanding Unit Award

Commanders
- Current commander: Colonel Ryan O'Neal (Jul 2025)

Insignia
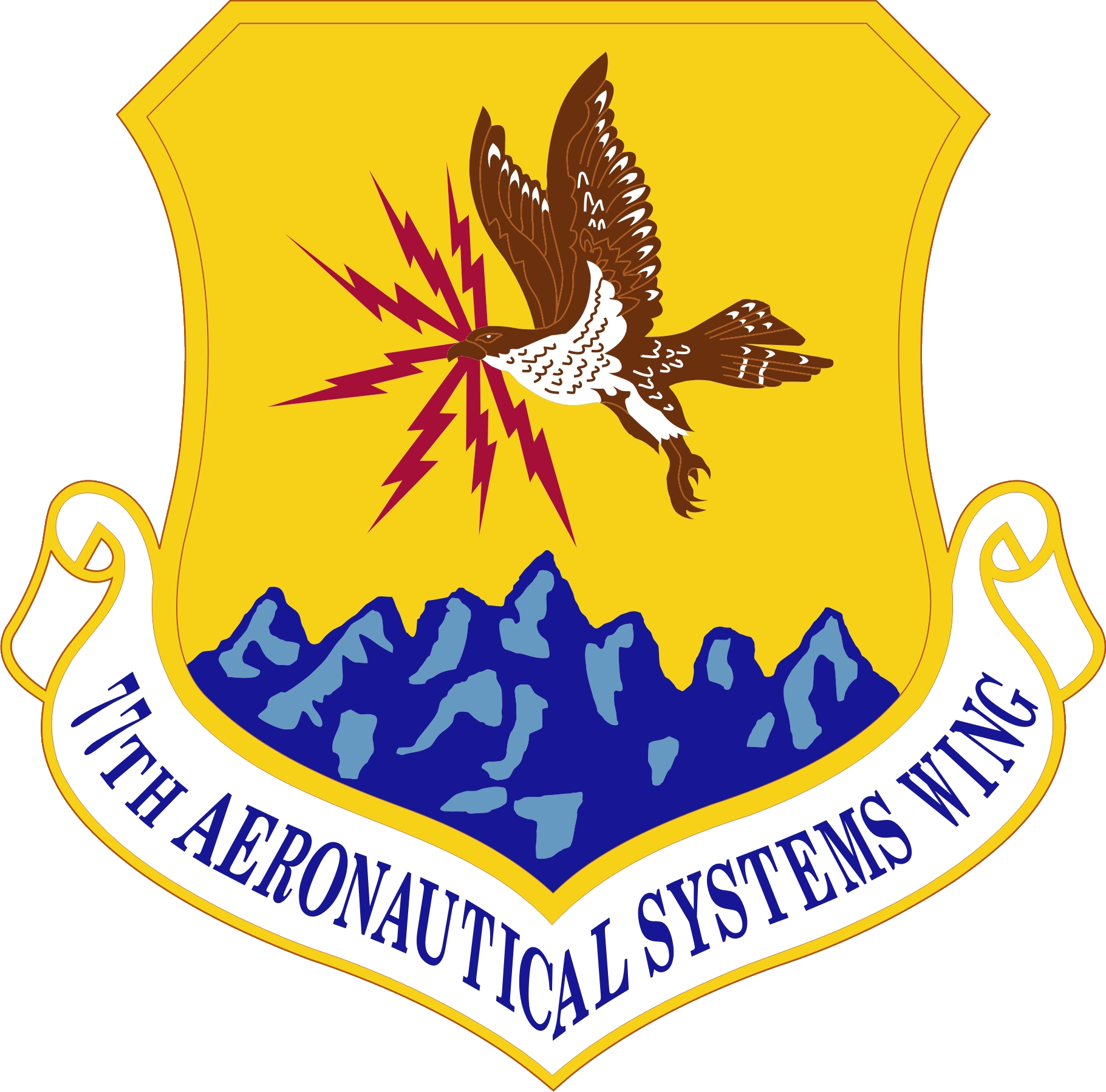
- 77th Aeronautical Systems Wing emblem (Note: Approved 28 February 1943 and modified to place on Air Force shield 15 June 1994. Description: Or, a broad-winged hawk volant proper holding in its beak a mullet gules and emitting from its eyes seven flashes of the last [color], issuant from base a mountain range of seven peaks azure)

The 77th Intelligence Wing is an active United States Air Force unit, stationed at Joint Base Anacostia-Bolling, where it was activated on 31 July 2025. The wing was previously active as the 77th Aeronautical Systems Wing at Wright-Patterson Air Force Base, Ohio from 2005 until 2005.

It was established during World War II as the 77th Reconnaissance Group supported ground units in training by flying reconnaissance, artillery adjustment, fighter, and bomber missions, and in the process trained reconnaissance personnel who later served overseas until it was disbanded in 1943.

It was reestablished as the 77th Air Base Wing at McClellan Air Force Base, California, serving as the host unit for the Sacramento Air Logistics Center and other units until inactivating as McClellan closed in 2001.

== Mission and component units ==
The wing performs classified operations supporting the Defense Intelligence Agency. It includes the following subordinate units:

- 2nd Intelligence Squadron
- 5th Intelligence Support Squadron
- 6th Intelligence Support Squadron
- 15th Intelligence Squadron

== History ==
=== World War II ===
During World War II the 77th Observation Group supported ground units in training by flying reconnaissance, artillery adjustment, fighter, and bomber missions, and in the process trained reconnaissance personnel who later served overseas. The group's 5th Observation Squadron moved to Desert Center Army Air Field in March 1943, where it supported units training at the Desert Training Center, later relocating to Thermal Army Air Field in September. It converted entirely to "Grasshopper" aircraft in April 1943, becoming the 5th Liaison Squadron. The 113th Observation Squadron flew antisubmarine patrols over the Gulf of Mexico from March until June 1942 when it was relieved by another squadron (the 128th Observation Squadron). Still another squadron (the 120th Observation Squadron) patrolled the Mexican border from March–July 1942. A detachment of the 77th served in India from February until July 1943. The 77th was inactivated in 1943.

=== Host at McClellan ===
The 77th was redesignated the 77th Tactical Intelligence Wing in 1985, though it remained inactive. It was then consolidated with the 2852nd Air Base Wing in 1994 to provide services and support for McClellan Air Force Base, California with its satellite installations and the Sacramento Air Logistics Center with its tenant organizations (the 2852nd had been performing this duty since 1 August 1953) until the base was closed in 2001.

=== Aeronautical and Human Systems ===
The Human Systems Center was created in 1992, integrating people into Air Force systems through research and development. It was formed at Brooks Air Force Base, San Antonio, Texas, from parts of the Aerospace Medical Division. It was reflagged and reorganized into the 311th Human Systems Wing (1998). When the Agile Combat Support Systems Wing was created in 2004, it absorbed the functions and personnel of the 311th Human Systems Wing as the new Human Systems Group. This group was then redesignated as the 77th Aeronautical Systems Group in 2006.

The 77th Aeronautical Systems Group (ASG) moved from Brooks City-Base, Texas to Wright-Patterson Air Force Base, Ohio in mid-2009. It was inactivated on 30 June 2010 along with all aeronautical systems wings when the Aeronautical Systems Center was reorganized.

The 77th ASG supported the Aeronautical Systems Center. Its units perform a variety of missions:

==== Human Systems Group ====
Provided advanced performance, survival, and force protection capabilities to U.S. and allied air, ground, and naval forces through development, production, and sustainment of human-centered systems including aircrew life support, egress, survival, aeromedical equipment, medical information, aerovac equipment testing/certification, AF uniforms, and aircraft mishap analysis.

==== Simulator Systems Group ====
Responsible for the development, production, test, integration, deployment, modification, and sustainment of common training solutions for joint ground-based training and mission rehearsal systems.

==== Aging Aircraft Systems Squadron ====
Developed and fielded products that enhance the Air Force's aircraft fleet availability and mission capability while reducing total ownership cost. The squadron is responsible for the development, acquisition, and fielding of cross-enterprise materiel solutions that enhance fleet availability and mission capability.

==== Propulsion Systems Squadron ====
Responsible for the development, production, test, and fielding of propulsion systems for the Joint Strike Fighter, F/A-22, and C-17. It also manages the Component Improvement Program, critical sustaining engineering for Air Force propulsion, and modernization of all Air Force propulsion systems, future propulsion capabilities, and allied F-15/F-16 engines.

==== Combat Electronics Systems Squadron ====
Responsible for the development, testing, acquiring, fielding and sustainment of materiel capabilities for multiple Department of Defense and allied aircraft weapon systems.

== Lineage ==
77th Reconnaissance Group

- Established as the 77th Observation Group on 5 February 1942

Activated on 2 March 1942
Redesignated 77th Reconnaissance Group on 2 April 1943
Redesignated 77th Tactical Reconnaissance Group on 11 August 1943
Disestablished on 30 November 1943

- Reestablished, and redesignated 77th Tactical Intelligence Wing on 31 July 1985 (remained inactive)
- Consolidated with the 2852d Air Base Wing on 16 September 1994

77th Air Base Wing

- Established as the 2852d Air Base Wing and organized on 1 August 1953

Redesignated: 2852d Air Base Group on 16 October 1964
Redesignated: 652d Support Group on 1 October 1992
Redesignated: 652d Air Base Group on 1 October 1993

- Consolidated with the 77th Tactical Intelligence Wing on 16 September 1994

Redesignated: 77th Air Base Wing on 1 October 1994
Inactivated on 13 July 2001

- Consolidated with the Agile Combat Support Systems Wing on 23 June 2006

77th Intelligence Wing

- Established as the Agile Combat Support Systems Wing on 23 November 2004

Activated on 18 January 2005

- Consolidated with the 77th Air Base Wing on 23 June 2006

Redesignated 77th Aeronautical Systems Wing on 14 July 2006
Inactivated on 30 June 2010

- Redesignated 77th Intelligence wing on 1 July 2025

Activated on 31 July 2025

=== Assignments ===
- Air Force Combat Command, 2 March 1942
- 2nd Air Support Command, 12 March 1942
- 3d Ground Air Support Command, 24 May 1942
- Second Air Force, 21 August 1942
- 2nd Ground Air Support Command (later II Air Support Command), 7 September 1942 (attached to 3rd Ground Air Support Command (later III Air Support Command, III Reconnaissance Command), 7 September 1942 – 30 November 1943
- Sacramento Air Materiel Area (later Sacramento Air Logistics Center), 1 August 1953 – 13 July 2001
- Aeronautical Systems Center, 18 January 2005 – 30 June 2010
- Air Force District of Washington, 31 July 2025 – present

=== Operational components ===
- 2nd Intelligence Squadron, 31 July 2025 – present
- 5th Observation Squadron: 25 January – 2 April 1943
- 15th Intelligence Squadron, 31 July 2025 – present
- 27th Observation Squadron (later, 27th Reconnaissance Squadron, 27th Tactical Reconnaissance Squadron): 17 July 1942 – 30 November 1943
- 35th Photographic Reconnaissance Squadron: 11 August – 30 November 1943 (detached 11 August – 31 October 1943)
- 113th Observation Squadron (later 113th Reconnaissance Squadron, 113th Tactical Reconnaissance Squadron): 12 March 1942 – 30 November 1943
- 120th Observation Squadron (later 120th Reconnaissance Squadron, 120 Tactical Reconnaissance Squadron): 12 March 1942 – 30 November 1943
- 125th Observation Squadron (later 125th Liaison Squadron): 12 March 1942 – 11 August 1943
- 128th Observation Squadron (later 21st Antisubmarine Squadron): 12 March 1942 – 8 March 1943 (detached 3 July – 7 September 1942 and 15 October 1942 – 3 March 1943)
- 332nd Airlift Flight, 31 May – 1 October 1993

=== Support components ===
- 5th Intelligence Support Squadron, 31 July 2025 – present
- 6th Intelligence Support Squadron, 31 July 2025 – present

=== Stations ===
- Salinas Army Air Base, California, 2 March 1942
- Brownwood Army Airfield, Texas, c. 22 March 1942
- DeRidder Army Air Base, Louisiana, 25 July 1942
- Alamo Field, Texas, 28 September 1942
- Abilene Army Air Field, Texas, 6 April 1943
- Esler Field, Louisiana, 13 September 1943
- Birmingham Army Air Field, Alabama, 14 – 30 November 1943
- McClellan Air Force Base, California, 1 August 1953 – 13 July 2001
- Wright-Patterson Air Force Base, Ohio, 18 January 2005 – 30 June 2010
- Joint Base Anacostia-Bolling,m 31 July 2025 – present

=== Aircraft ===
- Douglas O-38 (1942–1943)
- North American O-47 (1942–1943)
- Curtiss O-52 Owl (1942–1943)
- Stinson L-5 Sentinel (1942–1943)
- Douglas O-46 (1942)
- Douglas O-43 (1942)
- Curtiss A-18 Shrike (1942)
- Stinson L-1 Vigilant (1942–1943)
- Piper L-4 (1942–1943)
- Aeronca L-3 (1942–1943)
- Interstate L-6 (1942–1943)
- Douglas B-18 Bolo (1942–1943)
- Stinson O-49 Vigilant (1942)
- Bell P-39 Airacobra (1942–1943)
- North American B-25 Mitchell (1943)
- Douglas A-20 Havoc (1943)

== See also ==
- List of wings of the United States Air Force
