= San Antonio Area Foundation =

The San Antonio Area Foundation is a 501(c)(3) nonprofit organization established in 1964 as a community foundation. The San Antonio Area Foundation manages and administers charitable funds for individuals and organizations in San Antonio and South Central Texas. The Area Foundation Board of Directors are community volunteers who give guidance and oversight. The Area Foundation has a grants program and is in partnership with San Antonio city government and other nonprofit entities for the community initiatives.

== Mission ==
The San Antonio Area Foundation's mission is to help donors achieve their charitable goals for the greater benefit of the community long-term, to help the city of San Antonio give back into its own community.

== Grants philosophy ==
Honoring donors' wishes for the betterment of the community is the fundamental principle behind the San Antonio Area Foundation’s grant distribution process. Grants from Donor Advised Trusts and Funds are made throughout the year based upon receipt of donor recommendations. The Area Foundation also awards annual Community and Research Grants from permanent trusts and funds through a competitive proposal process.

In the year 2015, the Foundation granted $1 million or more to the following organizations: San Antonio Botanical Garden, YMCA of Greater San Antonio, Southwest School of Art, Any Baby Can, Morgan's Wonderland, Witte Museum, UTSA College of Sciences, and San Antonio Museum of Art.

== Knight Foundation NOWcastSA Grant received ==
The San Antonio Area Foundation received a matching grant for $488,500 from the John S. and James L. Knight Foundation to fund NOWcastSA, a grassroots project of the Alamo Area Community Information System (AACIS) administered by the San Antonio Area Foundation.

NOWcastSA is a virtual public square where people share relevant news and information online. It empowers neighborhoods to define for themselves how to create, exchange, and use community information and conversation. NOWcastSA provides hands-on training for citizen journalists creating stories and information through the use of online broadcast technology and social networking.

== TRIAD fund ==
In 2007 the Dallas Foundation, the Permian Basin Area Foundation, and the San Antonio Area Foundation established funds for Texas Resources for Iraq-Afghanistan Deployment (TRIAD) Fund, collectively awarded over $11 million in support of agencies serving OEF and OIF families.

In August 2008, the Iraq-Afghanistan Deployment Impact Fund of the California Community Foundation provided additional funding of $15 million to continue this work in the State of Texas. The Dallas Foundation and San Antonio Area Foundation are now accepting applications from 501(c)(3) agencies providing services in their region.
