= University of Texas at San Antonio College of Sciences =

Science and research education college

UTSA College of Sciences
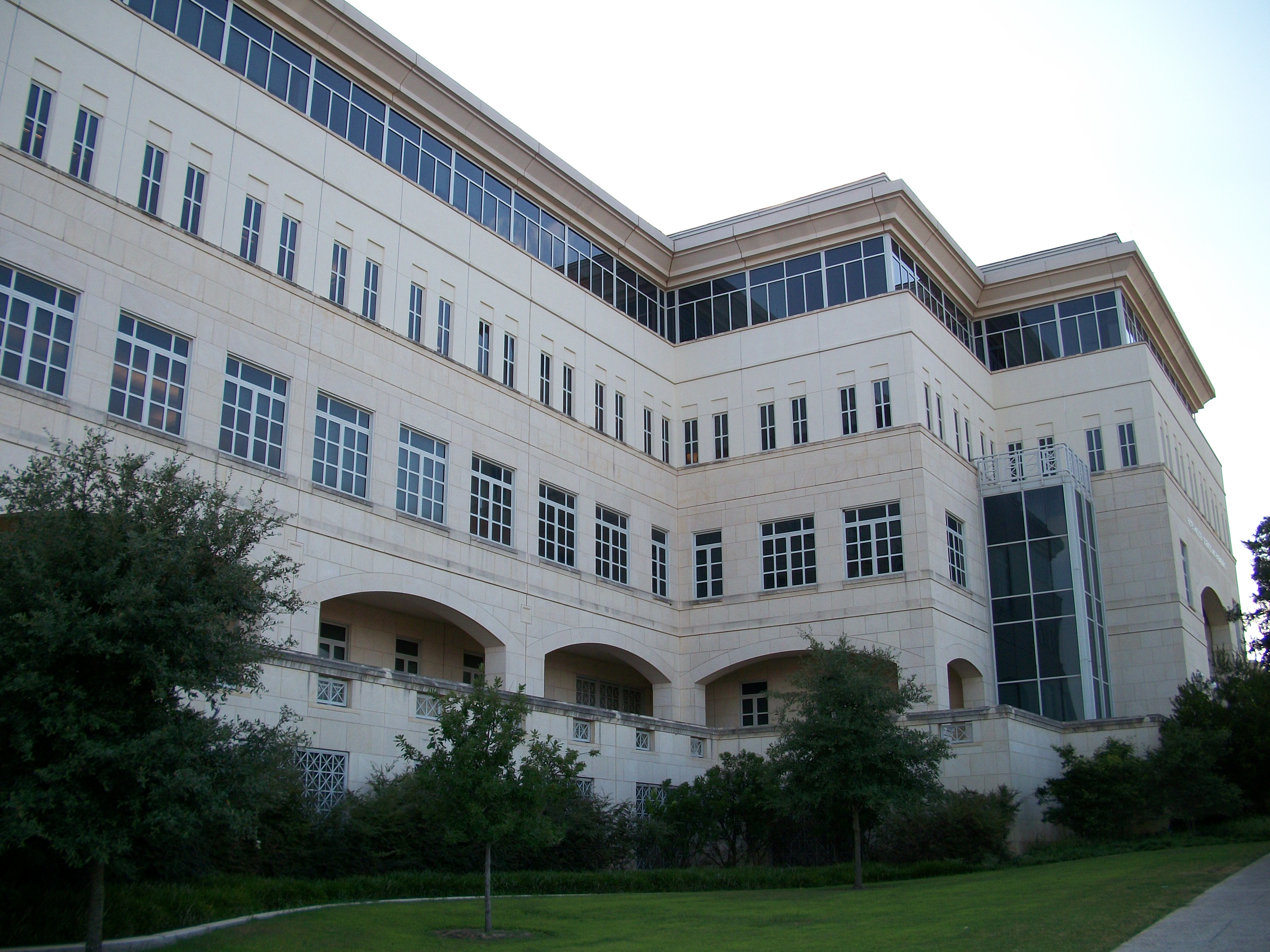
- Biotechnology Sciences and Engineering Building
- Parent institution: University of Texas at San Antonio
- Dean: John H. Frederick (interim)
- Academic staff: 300+
- Students: 6,190 (Fall 2023)
- Location: San Antonio, TX
- Website: https://sciences.utsa.edu/

The College of Sciences at the University of Texas at San Antonio in San Antonio, Texas is a science and research education college. The college hosts more than 6000 students enrolled in fifteen undergraduate programs and nineteen graduate programs. The eight departments employ over 300 tenure and non-tenure track faculty members. Students collaborate through programs with local external research institutions including UT Health Science Center, Southwest Research Institute and the Southwest Foundation for Biomedical Research.

== Departments and Programs ==
There are various degrees offered by eight major programs at the College of Sciences.

Program	B.A.	B.S.	M.S.	Ph.D.	Other
Applied Mathematics - Industrial Mathematics					
Biochemistry					
Biology					1
Biotechnology					
Chemistry					1
Cloud Computing					3
Cybersecurity Science					2
Computer Science					1
Developmental and Regenerative Sciences					
Environmental Science					1,3
Environmental Science & Engineering					
Environmental Sustainability					3
Geoinformatics					
Geographic Information Science					3
Geographic Information System					4
Geosciences					
Mathematics					1
Mathematics Education					
Mathematics for Teaching					
Mathematics of Data and Computing					1
Microbiology and Immunology					
Molecular Microbiology and Immunology					
Multidisciplinary Science					
Neuroscience					
Physics					1

1. Minor can be earned in the field.
2. Concentration is offered in the field.
3. Graduate Certificate program.
4. Undergraduate Certificate program.

=== Chemistry ===
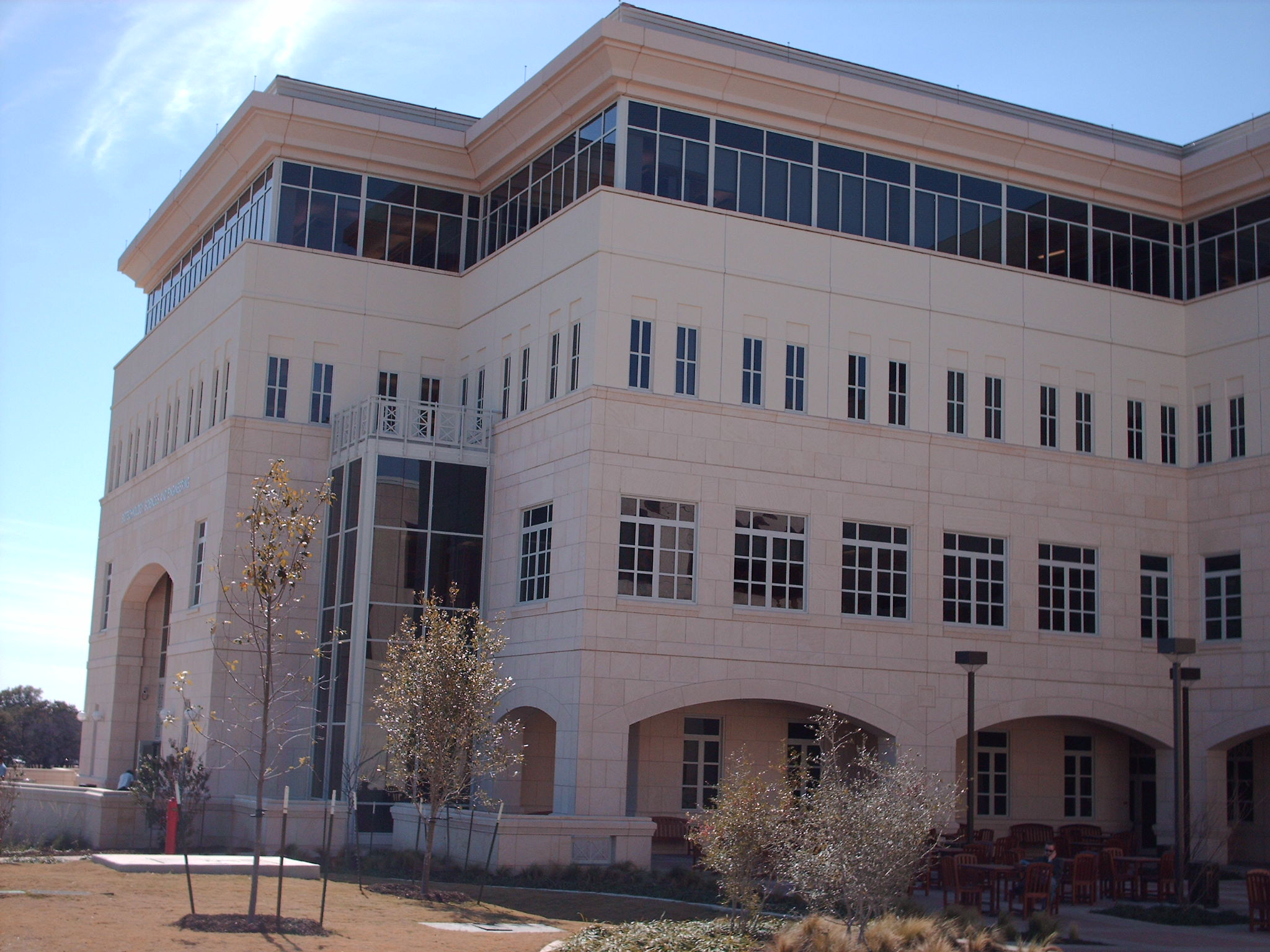
UTSA's Biotechnology Building

The Chemistry Department (CHEM) conducts active research programs under the major sub-disciplines of organic chemistry, biochemistry, inorganic chemistry, analytical chemistry, materials chemistry, and physical chemistry as well as through interdisciplinary collaborations. The search for a molecular-scale understanding of chemical reactions and properties of nature underlies the research programs of the faculty.

=== Computer Science ===
The Computer Science Department (CS) is one of the departments at the University that does research in many areas including compilers, programming languages, software engineering, networking, bioinformatics, algorithms, artificial intelligence, cyber security, high-performance computing, computer vision, and distributed computing. The department has 24 faculty members, computer labs, and many computing facilities and wireless networks.

=== Earth and Planetary Sciences ===
The Earth and Planetary Sciences Department (EPS) offers both undergraduate and graduate students research opportunities in areas such as Geoinformatics, Geology and Geophysics, Paleoenvironment Reconstruction, Polar Science, Climate Science, and Water Cycle Science. Department faculty, researchers, and students pursue field and laboratory studies of geological and environmental problems. The department's facilities include biogeochemistry, hydrogeology, isotope geochemistry, micropaleontology and stratigraphy, remote sensing/spatial analysis, river science, and sea ice studies.

=== Integrative Biology ===
The Integrative Biology Department (IB) is a comprehensive academic Department that offers a B.S. degree in Biology, a B.A. degree in Environmental Studies, a B.S. degree in Environmental Science, and a B.S. degree in Multidisciplinary Science, plus a M.S. degree in Biology and a M.S. degree in Environmental Science. It offers undergraduate and graduate students research opportunities in four principal areas: Aquatic Science, Conservation and Restoration Ecology, Natural Resources and Wildlife Management, as well as Plant Biology.

=== Molecular Microbiology and Immunology ===
The Molecular Microbiology and Immunology Department (MMI) is a comprehensive academic unit that offers a B.S. degree in Microbiology and Immunology, a M.S. degree in Biotechnology, and a Ph.D. degree in Molecular Microbiology and Immunology. The department offers programs that supports students interested in pursuing professional or graduate programs (e.g., medical, dental, pharmaceutical and veterinarian) in health-related professions. Graduates are prepared for careers in biomedical research, veterinary science, pharmaceutical research, lab technician, food safety, scientific writing, quality control, recombinant DNA technology, fermentation technologists, education, medical diagnosis, and biotechnology research.

=== Mathematics ===
The Mathematics Department (MATH) is active in a variety of research areas across multiple mathematical concentrations including: Mathematical Biology; Theory and Applications of Partial Differential Equations; Analysis, Operator Theory, and Operator Algebra; Numerical Analysis and Scientific Computing; Mathematics Education; Model Theory and Foundations; Probability, Optimization, Computing and Geometry; Mathematical Physics; Principles of Urbanism; and Systems and Control.

=== Neuroscience, Developmental and Regenerative Biology ===
The Neuroscience, Developmental and Regenerative Biology Department (NDRB) is a comprehensive academic unit that offers a B.S. degree in Neuroscience plus a Ph.D. degree in Developmental and Regenerative Sciences, and a Ph.D. degree in Neuroscience. The department offers undergraduate and graduate students research opportunities in two principal areas: Cell and Molecular Biology and Neuroscience.

=== Physics and Astronomy ===
The Physics and Astronomy Department (P&A) is a comprehensive academic unit that offers B.A. and B.S. degrees in Physics, plus a M.S. degree in Physics and a Ph.D. degree in Physics. The department has active research in a variety of areas including Astrophysics and Cosmology; Biophysics; Computational Physics; Experimental and Theoretical Condensed Matter Physics; Materials Science; and Nanotechnology and Ultramicroscopy and collaborate with scientists from the Space Science and Engineering Division at Southwest Research Institute.

== Research ==
Of the $152.3 million of research expenditure for the fiscal year 2023 in the University of Texas at San Antonio, the College of Sciences contributed to $46.3 millions. Allowing students to participate in the growth of their fields through research enables them to succeed both in academia as well as in the applied sciences.

The 227,000-square-foot (21,100 m^{2}) Biotechnology, Sciences, and Engineering Building is one of the largest research-related educational centers in Texas. The building includes 70 research and instructional laboratories that facilitate interdisciplinary research and collaboration between scientists and engineers.

=== Centers & Institutes ===
- Center for Infrastructure Assurance and Security (CIAS)
- Center for Innovative Drug Discovery (CIDD)
- Center for Research and Training in the Sciences (CRTS)
- Institute for Cyber Security (ICS)
- Institute for Water Research, Sustainability and Policy (IWRSP)
- NASA MIRO Center for Advanced Measurements in Extreme Environments (CAMEE)
- South Texas Center for Emerging Infectious Diseases (STCEID)
- Center for Infrastructure Assurance and Security (CIAS)
- UTSA Brain Health Consortium (BHC)
- Consortium on Nuclear Security Technologies (CONNECT)
- Kleberg Advanced Microscopy Center (KAMC)
- The Institute of Regenerative Medicine

== Student organizations ==
There are many science organizations on campus.

- Beta Beta Beta biological honor society
- Mu Alpha Tau mathematics honor society
- Upsilon Pi Epsilon computer science honor society
- Chemistry Club - American Chemical Society Student Affiliate Chapter
- Graduate Society of Physics Students
- Society of Physics Students
- Society of Undergraduate Neuroscience
- Statistics Club
- Macintosh Exchange Activity - for students interested in automotive engineering
- Physical Therapy Society
- Physician Assistant Society
- Pre Nursing Society - for engineering honors students
- Pre Dental Society
- Pre-Medical Society
- Pre-Pharmacy Student Organization
- Society of Mexican-American Engineers and Scientists
- Alpha Epsilon Delta pre-medical society
