= Design and Technology =

Area of study taught at schools and colleges

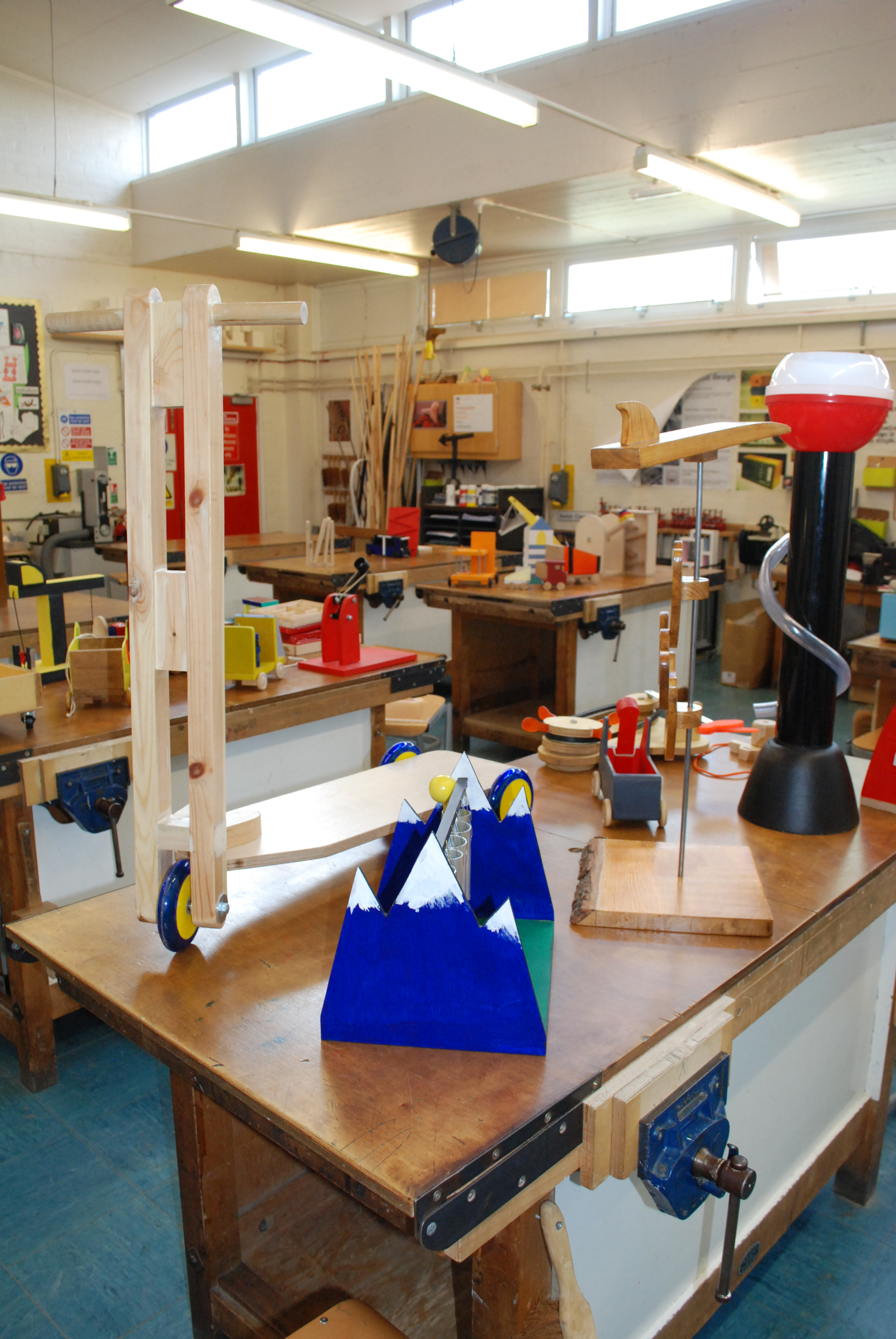
Design and Technology projects at Jordanhill School, Glasgow

Design and Technology (D&T) is a school subject taught in the United Kingdom to pupils in primary and secondary schools. It first appeared as a titled subject in the first National Curriculum for England in 1990. It has been reviewed several times alongside the whole National Curriculum, most recently in 2013.

D&T is also taught in many countries around the world, such as India, the United States, Australia, New Zealand, Ireland, Malta, China, South Africa, Latvia, France, Finland and Singapore.

As a school subject it involves students designing in a practical context using a range of materials and media. It is also a university course in many countries, including Australia, Canada, the US, Singapore, South Africa, the Netherlands, and New Zealand, both for the preparation of teachers and for general education in areas such as industrial design. UK universities that offer courses include Brighton, Sheffield Hallam, Goldsmiths, University of London and Greenwich.

== Design and Technology in England ==
=== Purpose and aims of D&T ===
The National Curriculum for England states:

"Design and Technology is an inspiring, rigorous and practical subject. Using creativity and imagination, pupils design and make products that solve real and relevant problems within a variety of contexts, considering their own and others’ needs, wants and values. They acquire a broad range of subject knowledge and draw on disciplines such as mathematics, physics, mechanics, electronics, engineering, computing and art. Pupils learn how to take risks, becoming resourceful, innovative, enterprising and capable citizens. Through the evaluation of past and present design and technology, they develop a critical understanding of its impact on daily life and the wider world. High-quality design and technology education makes an essential contribution to the creativity, culture, wealth and well-being of the nation."

It gives four aims: "to ensure that all pupils:

1. develop the creative, technical and practical expertise needed to perform everyday tasks confidently and to participate successfully in an increasingly technological world
2. build and apply a repertoire of knowledge, understanding and skills in order to design and make high-quality prototypes and products for a wide range of users
3. critique, evaluate and test their ideas and products and the work of others
4. understand and apply the principles of nutrition and learn how to cook"

The second goal is known as "design and technology capability" and is the interaction of responding to a design and technology context whilst drawing on the resources of knowledge and experience, where pupils develop “the power to produce change and improvement in the made world”.

=== Design and Technology qualifications ===
==== GCSE D&T (2017 onwards) ====
Taught primarily to pupils in upper secondary school (years 10–11, aged 14–16), the GCSE incorporates all material areas (with the exception of food, which is now a separate GCSE). As with the previous GCSE, the new GCSE specifications have two assessed components, an exam and a non-examined assessment (NEA), but with the marks split 50:50.

==== A level ====
A and AS level examinations prepare students for individualised learning and problem solving. The subject covers activities from control technology to aesthetic product design. Students use a range of computer software, including computer-aided design and manufacture, spreadsheets and computer presentations. Outputs from such work are often sent to CNC machines for manufacture.

==== Previous qualification in D&T ====
With the first National Curriculum, new GCSE qualifications were introduced for D&T in England, Wales, and Northern Ireland. Unlike in the National Curriculum, the previous subject titles were retained (e.g. home economics and craft, design and technology (CDT)) and others were added (e.g. electronics, food technology, textiles technology, and systems and control). These GCSE specifications had two assessed components:

- 50% of the final mark for coursework
- 50% for an examination of general subject knowledge (materials, processes, techniques, sustainability, etc.).

GCSE D&T titles that were offered included:

- GCSE Design and Technology: Electronic Products
- GCSE Design and Technology: Food Technology
- GCSE Design and Technology: Graphic Products
- GCSE Design and Technology: Resistant Materials
- GCSE Design and Technology: Systems and Control
- GCSE Design and Technology: Textiles Technology
- GCSE Design and Technology: Product Design

== International Baccalaureate in Design Technology ==
The IB Design Technology (DT) is an elective subject offered in many International Baccalaureate schools globally. Design is also offered in the IB Middle Years Programme (MYP) as a compulsory subject for grades 6–10, and at the Diploma Programme level (from grades 11–12). IB Design Technology is broadly similar in content to Design and Technology. It is one of the Group 4 sciences.

The primary focus of MYP Design is to give students an understanding of the design cycle through a practical programme. Students complete projects based on solving a real problem. They document their progress as they follow the design cycle to reach a feasible solution. They create the solution and then evaluate it following thorough testing.

The Diploma Programme of Design Technology is a two-year introduction to designing, a range of fundamentals of technology, and global technological issues. It provides students with the knowledge to design and make in school workshops, and to develop an informed literacy about technology in general. Because it is an international curriculum, it has a particular focus on global environmental issues. Its core topics are human factors and ergonomics, resource management and sustainable production, modeling, raw materials to final production, innovation and design, and classic design. Its higher level topics are user centered design, sustainability, innovation and markets, and commercial production. The diploma is accepted for university entrance in many countries and can serve as preparation for careers in areas such as engineering, architecture, product design, interior design, design and education.

== Scotland ==
Technological education is part of the Scottish secondary school curriculum. It is divided into various subjects available at National 4, National 5, Higher and Advanced Higher

levels.

Standard Subject in Technical

- Graphic Communication
- Design and Manufacture
- Engineering Science
- Practical Electronics (available to N5 level)
- Practical Woodwork (available to N5 level)
- Practical Metalwork (available to N5 level)

Specialist Subjects within Technical

- Architectural technology
- Automotive engineering
- Civil engineering
- Building services
- Construction
- Electrical engineering
- Mechanical engineering
- Mechatronics

== Wales ==
In 2022, the new Welsh Curriculum combined distinct school subjects into Areas of Learning Experience (AoLE). D&T now comes under the "Science and Technology" AoLE, though as of 2025 not all schools had fully transitioned to this approach, and some still taught D&T as a standalone subject.

== Awards ==
In the UK, the Arkwright Scholarships Trust awards two-year scholarships to students who are taking GCSE/Scottish Standard Grade in design & technology. The Arkwright Engineering Scholarships support students through their A levels/Scottish Highers and encourage them to study engineering or a related area of design at university or through an industrial apprenticeship.

== See also ==
- Industrial arts, the equivalent course in the United States and Australia (Victoria).
