= Aeronautical Systems Center =

- Active: 1961–2012
- Country: United States
- Branch: United States Air Force
- Role: Equipment procurement and sustainment
- Garrison/HQ: Wright-Patterson Air Force Base

Insignia
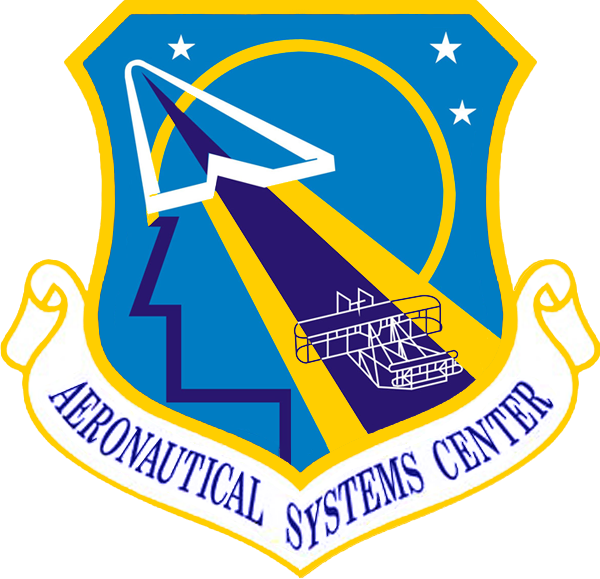
- Aeronautical Systems Center emblem

The Aeronautical Systems Center (ASC) was a U.S. Air Force product center that designed, developed and delivered aviation weapon systems and capabilities. It developed systems for the U.S. Air Force, other U.S. Department of Defense customers, allied, and coalition/partner/client forces. The ASC and its predecessors were located at Wright-Patterson Air Force Base for decades. ASC was established in 1961, and over its lifetime it managed 420 Air Force, joint and international aircraft acquisition programs and related projects; executed an annual budget that reached $19 billion and employed a workforce of more than 11,000 people located at Wright-Patterson AFB and 38 other locations worldwide.

ASC's portfolio included capabilities in fighter/attack, long-range strike, reconnaissance, mobility, agile combat support, special operations forces, training, unmanned aircraft systems, human systems integration and installation support. ASC was inactivated during a 20 July 2012 ceremony held at Wright-Patterson Air Force Base, Ohio.

== History ==
=== World War II ===
The Materiel Division was re-designated the Air Corps Materiel Command in 1942 as the role of the Army Air Force expanded. By 1943, well over 800 major, and thousands of minor research and development projects were in progress at Wright Field. Because many materials were scarce or unavailable during the war, scientists in the Materials Laboratory were involved in developing and testing a number of substitutes, including synthetic rubber for tires, nylon for parachutes, and plastic for canopies. The Armament Laboratory developed armored, self-sealing fuel tanks, increased bomb load capacity, gun turrets, and defensive armament. The command continued to work on future projects as well as wartime immediate needs. In 1944, Major Ezra Kotcher undertook pioneering work that led to the first supersonic airplane, the Bell X-1.

From September 1942, with the need to preserve secrecy with new aircraft such as the Bell P-59 Airacomet, the first trial U.S. jet aircraft, experimental flight testing of airframes began to take place at Rogers Dry Lake, near Muroc Army Air Field, California.

=== Cold War ===
The new independent Air Force created the Air Research and Development Command and placed the principal elements of engineering, the laboratories, and flight testing under the Air Development Force (Provisional) (2 April 1951), soon renamed the Wright Air Development Center (WADC) (7 June 1951). It had divisions including Weapons Systems, Weapons Components, Research, Aeronautics, All-Weather Flying, Flight Test, and Materiel, and 12 laboratories. Engineers at Wright Field evaluated captured foreign aircraft during and after World War II. Aircraft brought to Wright Field included allied aircraft such as the Russian Yakovlev Yak-9 and the British Supermarine Spitfire and de Havilland Mosquito, and enemy aircraft including the German Junkers Ju 88, Messerschmitt Bf 109, Focke-Wulf Fw 190, Messerschmitt Me 262, and the Japanese A6M Zero. Also under WADC's aegis was the 6502 Parachute Development Test Group at Naval Auxiliary Air Station El Centro, California.

Postwar flight testing at Wright-Patterson was confined to component and instrument testing and other specialized kinds of flight test. The most important addition to postwar flight testing at Wright Field was all-weather testing. It represented the first major attempt to solve the many problems encountered in flying under all weather conditions, both day and night.

Wright Aeronautical Development Center developed two "workhorse" aircraft during the 1950s, the Boeing B-52 Stratofortress and Lockheed C-130 Hercules. WADC also developed the experimental X-planes, in an effort to advance aviation technology, including the Ryan X-13 Vertijet, the third U.S. VTOL testbed. WADC also contributed to the Department of Defense space program through the X-20 Dyna-Soar spaceplane project and Zero-G training. The XQ-6 and XQ-9 target drones were conceived by the WADC but never reached the hardware phase.

WADC was inactivated and replaced by the Wright Air Development Division which was constituted and activated on 15 December 1959. Then in 1961 the Air Force merged the Air Research and Development Command with the procurement functions of Air Materiel Command to form Air Force Systems Command. The WADD was discontinued on 1 April 1961, and its lineage ended. It was effectively replaced by the Aeronautical Systems Division (ASD).

In 1963, the Materials, Avionics, Aero Propulsion, and Flight Dynamics Laboratories were established and placed under one organization, the Research and Technology Division. In 1963, AFSC placed ASD's engineering directorate and its four newly established laboratories for Materials, Aero Propulsion, Avionics, and Flight Dynamics under a Research and Technology Division (RTD). Research during this time included examining different materials for aircraft structure, phased-array radar, and improved power plants. In 1967 RTD was disestablished, with systems engineering returning to ASD while the four laboratories were placed under AFSC's Director of Laboratories. In 1975, the laboratories were placed under a new organization at Wright Field, the Air Force Wright Aeronautical Laboratories (AFWAL).

During the Vietnam War, ASD set up a special division called Limited War/Special Air Warfare to respond to the special requirements dictated by the conflict. Part of this concept was "Project 1559" which provided a means for rapidly evaluating new hardware ideas to determine their usefulness for conducting limited war. Support systems included a highly mobile tactical air control system, disposable parachutes, intrusion alarms for air base defense, and a grenade launcher for the AR-15 rifle. In response to the unique climate found in Southeast Asia ASD an evaluation of chemical rain repellents for fighter aircraft and discovered that varieties of repellant applied to cockpit windshields on the ground prior to the flight had a long life and could last several hours, even days.

During the early 1970s the Department of Defense became concerned with the rising costs of military procurement and consequently abandoned the concept of buying a weapon system as a complete, finished package, and reorganized the acquisition cycle into five phases: conceptual, validation, development, production, and deployment. The Air Force viewed this as a more flexible approach; providing oversight, review, and evaluation during each phase. Under this new process the ASD continued enhancing airframes, and developing armaments.

The 1980s brought additional funding restraints led to additional reorganization for the ASD. In 1982, AFWAL was merged with ASD, thereby uniting for the first time since the early 1960s the system program offices (SPOs) and the laboratories in one organization. In addition to equipment engineering the ASD worked on process improvement as well by introducing Total Quality Management (TQM). ASD also helped operationalize stealth technology which had been introduced in the 1970s. Work also began on a system of very high speed integrated circuits that would allow advanced avionics architectures to integrate many aircraft subsystems such as weapons delivery, flight controls, and communications into smaller, more reliable subsystems. The Avionics and Flight Dynamics Laboratories coordinated research on an "all-glass" cockpit of the future that would allow a pilot, through voice activation, to mix or "enhance" data presented in picture-like symbols on one large TV-like screen.

In 1988 AFWAL was reorganized and redesignated the Wright Research and Development Center (WRDC) and in 1990, the Wright Laboratory (WL).

=== Post-Cold War ===
In the post Cold War environment the Air Force again realigned its commands, merging the Air Force Logistics Command and the Air Force Systems Command to form the Air Force Materiel Command (AFMC). ASD was then relabeled the Aeronautical Systems Center (ASC) in 1992 and a massive reorganization ensued, however, ASC retained its leading role in the acquisition of new systems and the upgrade and modification of existing systems to support the Air Force's Core Competencies into the 21st century.

In light of the new security climate ASC moved to upgrade the Rockwell B-1 Lancer and Northrop B-2 Spirit from exclusively nuclear to conventional weapons. Subsequently, both aircraft saw combat. ASC has also placed a premium on Information Superiority and focused heavily on building sensors for the U-2 and unmanned aerial vehicles.

Air Force headquarters notified center commanders on May 11, 2010, that organizational changes away from the wing, group, squadron to a directorate, division, branch construct was approved. The targeted implementation date for these changes was planned to be June 30, 2010. For example, the 478th Aeronautical Systems Group responsible for the F-22 was effectively "reflagged" as the F-22 Division.

The Aeronautical Systems Center was inactivated on 20 July 2012; its units were merged into Air Force Life Cycle Management Center.

== Lineage ==
- Constituted as the Aeronautical Systems Division on 21 March 1961

Activated on 1 April 1961
Redesignated Aeronautical Systems Center on 1 July 1992
Inactivated on 1 October 2012

=== Assignments ===
- Air Force Systems Command, 1 April 1961
- Air Force Materiel Command, 1 July 1992 – 1 October 2012 (attached to Air Force Life Cycle Management Center after 20 July 2012)

=== Stations ===
- Wright-Patterson Air Force Base, 1 April 1961 – 1 October 2012

=== Subordinate units ===
- 77th Aeronautical Systems Wing
- 88th Air Base Wing
- 303d Aeronautical Systems Wing
- 311th Human Systems Wing
- 312th Aeronautical Systems Wing
- 326th Aeronautical Systems Wing
- 478th Aeronautical Systems Wing
- 516th Aeronautical Systems Wing
- 4950th Test Wing
- 6502 Parachute Development Test Group (at NAS El Centro)
