= Systems and Control =

Educational qualification in the UK

GCSE Systems and control is a General Certificate of Secondary Education in the United Kingdom.

== Specification ==
The course is a specialised branch of Design and Technology which focuses on electronics, mechanisms and pneumatics. Students are required to sit two exam papers, each worth 20% of the qualification. These are the core paper, covering topics similar to those included in Design Technology, and an option paper covering one of three major topics. The participant is required to produce a portfolio of course work, worth 60% of the total grade, made up of research and design work and a product made by the student.
