= Brooks Air Force Base =

Former U.S. military air base in San Antonio, Texas

- San Antonio, Texas in the United States
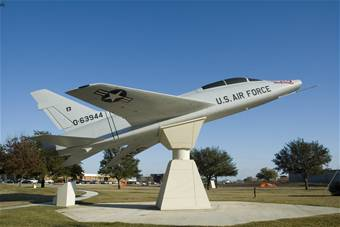
- North American F-100 Super Sabre on display at the former Brooks Air Force Base in 2008

Site information
- Type: US Air Force Base
- Owner: Department of Defense
- Operator: US Air Force
- Controlled by: Air Force Materiel Command
- Condition: Closed
- Website: Official website (archived)

Location
- Location within Texas Location within the United States
- Coordinates: 29.340°N 98.439°W

Site history
- Built: 1918 (as Brooks Field)
- In use: 1918 – 22 July 2002
- Fate: Redesignated as Brooks City-Base

Brooks Air Force Base was a United States Air Force facility located in San Antonio, Texas, 7 miles (11 km) southeast of Downtown San Antonio.

In 2002, Brooks Air Force Base was renamed Brooks City-Base when the property was conveyed to the Brooks Development Authority as part of a project between local, state, and federal government. The Brooks Development Authority is now the owner and operator of the property, and is redeveloping it as a science, business, and technology center; the U.S. Air Force was the largest tenant at Brooks City-Base before the departure of its operations in 2011.

== Units ==
=== Major units ===
- 311th Air Base Group
- 311th Human Systems Wing

=== Tenant units ===
- Air Force Audit Agency
- Air Force Research Laboratory

== History ==
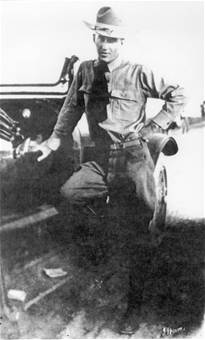
Sidney Johnson Brooks, Jr., the first flying cadet to lose his life in San Antonio during flight training in the World War I period.

On February 16, 1918, Kelly Field No. 5 became a separate post and named Brooks Field by the Aviation Section, U.S. Signal Corps to honor San Antonio aviator Sidney Johnson Brooks, Jr. The first commander of Brooks Field was Lt. Col. H. Conger Pratt, who until the preceding October had been a cavalryman.

From its founding until 1919, Brooks Field was used to train cadets in the Curtiss JN-4 aircraft, which was used for balloon and airship training. The program was cancelled in 1922 when the U.S. Army re-evaluated the usefulness of balloons and airships.

After the cancellation of the airship training, the 11th School Group was formed at Brooks Field as the Primary Flying School for the Air Service and Army Air Corps. The Primary Flying School continued operation until 1931 when it moved to Randolph Field in San Antonio. After the Primary Flying School's departure, Brooks Field became the new home for the Aerial Observation Center.

During World War II, Brooks Field housed the School for Combat Observers and the Advanced Flying School (Observation). The program remained in operation until 1943 when it was disbanded. Training in the school then switched to twin-engine aircraft, subsequently training pilots to fly the B-25 bomber.

After the war, Brooks Field became the home to several tactical and reserve units, and in 1948, Brooks Field formally became Brooks Air Force Base.

Since the early 1950s, Brooks AFB has been the home for the Aerospace Medical Center, which would include the School of Aerospace Medicine (SAM). In 1957, SAM scientists moved into the newly completed center at Brooks AFB. SAM aided the National Aeronautics and Space Administration (NASA) with Project Mercury and served as a back-up site for lunar samples brought back to Earth on the Apollo missions between 1969 and 1972. The air evacuation program at Brooks AFB proved vital to the care of wounded personnel in the Vietnam War.

President John F. Kennedy dedicated the School of Aerospace Medicine on November 21, 1963, the day before he was assassinated in Dallas, Texas. This was Kennedy's last official act as president.

Brooks Field Hangar 9 was restored in 1969 to become the U.S. Air Force Museum of Aerospace Medicine. This museum is to display the early history of Brooks Field and to preserve and display an extensive collection of photographs and equipment related to aviation and aerospace medicine.

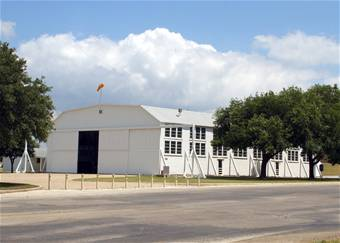
Hangar 9 stands as the only World War I era aircraft hangar listed in the National Register of Historic Places. Hangar 9 was built as a "temporary" structure in 1918 when Brooks Field was established as the location for the Signal Corps Aviation School.

After the Vietnam War, the base's mission narrowed to one centered on specific research related to U.S. Air Force fliers and personnel. In 1991, the Air Force was selected to house the Armstrong Laboratory, which included the Air Force Human Resources Laboratory, the Air Force Drug Testing Laboratory, the Harry G. Armstrong Aerospace Medical Research Laboratory, the Air Force Occupational and Environmental Health Laboratory, and the laboratory functions of SAM.

=== BRAC ===
Following the 1995 BRAC, when Brooks AFB was removed from the Base Realignment and Closure list, city, state, military, and community planners began several years of hard work to develop a plan to privatize approved the gradual transition in ownership of Brooks AFB from the Air Force to the Brooks Development Authority. This transition came into full effect on July 22, 2002, when the Brooks Development Authority assumed control of the newly named Brooks City-Base.

In 2005, Brooks City-Base was once again placed on the BRAC list. Air Force operations ceased on 15 September 2011. The Brooks Development Authority has demonstrated economic development success with projects including a 62-acre (250,000 m^{2}) retail development, approximately 256,000 square feet (23,800 m^{2}) of research and distribution facilities for DPT Laboratories, the South Texas Center for Emerging Infectious Diseases (an infectious disease research institute coordinated with the University of Texas at San Antonio), an international pharmaceutical company, and a $25.5 million City/County emergency operations center which opened in the Fall 2007. Brooks City-Base inactivated the 311th Air Base Group on 1 Sept, 2011, and the remaining few USAF personnel had shuttered the base for good by the 15th of that month.

In 2015, the University of the Incarnate Word School of Osteopathic Medicine was established on the site of the US Air Force's School of Aerospace Medicine. As the second osteopathic medical school in Texas, it achieved full accreditation in 2021 with the graduation of its inaugural class of students.

=== Previous names ===
- Gosport Field, prior to December 5, 1917
- Signal Corps Aviation School, Kelly Field #5, December 5, 1917

=== Major commands ===
USAAC/USAAF

- Department of Military Aeronautics, 1918-unk (later, Director of Air Service)
- Air Corps Training Cen, September 1, 1926 (also Eighth Corps Area [USA], 1921–1940)
- Gulf Coast Air Corps Training Cen, December 11, 1940 – May 1, 1942
- Gulf Coast AAF Training Cen, May 1, 1942 – July 1, 1943
- AAF Central Flying Training Comd, July 31, 1943 – December 1, 1945
- Continental Air Forces, December 1, 1945 – March 21, 1946

United States Air Force

- Strategic Air Command, March 21, 1946 – March 23, 1946
- Tactical Air Command, March 23, 1946 – January 15, 1947
- Air Defense Command, January 15, 1947 – December 1, 1948
- Continental Air Command, December 1, 1948 – October 1, 1969
- United States Air Force Security Service, April 18, 1949 - July 31, 1953
- Air Training Command, October 1, 1959 – November 1, 1961
- Air Force Systems Command, November 1, 1961 – July 1, 1992
- Air Force Materiel Command, July 1, 1992 – September 1, 2011

=== Base operating units ===
USAAS/USAAC/USAAF

- 67th Aero Squadron (Service), April 6, 1918 – June 27, 1918
- Squadron "B" Brooks Fld, June 27, 1918 – November 14, 1918
- Flying School Det, Brooks Fld, November 14, 1918 – May 1919
- Air Corps Balloon and Airship School, Brooks Fld, c. May 1919 – June 1922
- 11th School Group (Primary Flying School), c. June 1922 – July 1931

46th and 47th School Squadrons, 62nd Service Squadron

- 62d Service Sq, c. July 1931 – August 1936
- 8th Air Base Sq, c. September 1936 – c. June 1939
- Unknown, July–August 1939
- 63d Air Base Gp, Sp, September 1, 1940 – November 1, 1941
- 53d Air Base Sq, November 1, 1941 – June 27, 1942
- 53d Base HQ and Air Base Sq, June 27, 1942 – May 1, 1944
- 2510th AAF Base Unit, May 1, 1944 – November 30, 1945
- 306th AAF Base Unit, November 30, 1945 – September 26, 1947

United States Air Force

- 306th AF Base Unit, September 26, 1947 – August 28, 1948
- 2595th Base Service Sq, August 28, 1948 – February 1, 1949
- 2595th Air Base Gp, February 1, 1949 – January 1, 1954
- 2577th Air Force Reserve Flying Training Cen, January 1, 1954 – September 15, 1954
- 2577th Air Reserve Flying Training Cen, September 15, 1954 – April 8, 1958
- 2577th Air Base Gp, April 8, 1958 – October 1, 1959
- 3790th Air Base Gp, October 1, 1959 – July 1, 1961
- Human Systems Center July 1, 1992 – October 1, 1998
- 6570th Air Base Gp, October 1, 1961 – July 1, 1992
- 648th Air Base Gp, July 1, 1992 – May 1, 1994
- 311th Human Systems Wing

== Government and infrastructure ==
The United States Postal Service Post Office at 8060 Aeromedical Road closed in late May 2011.

== See also ==
- Hangar 9, Brooks City-Base
- List of United States Army airfields
- List of former United States Air Force installations
- Texas World War II Army Airfields

== Sources ==
- Mueller, Robert (1989). Active Air Force Bases Within the United States of America on 17 September 1982. USAF Reference Series, Maxwell AFB, Alabama: Office of Air Force History. ISBN 0-912799-53-6
- Maurer, Maurer (1983). Air Force Combat Units Of World War II. Maxwell AFB, Alabama: Office of Air Force History. ISBN 0-89201-092-4.
- Mauer, Mauer (1969), Combat Squadrons of the Air Force, World War II, Air Force Historical Studies Office, Maxwell AFB, Alabama. ISBN 0-89201-097-5
- Shaw, Frederick J. (2004), Locating Air Force Base Sites History's Legacy, Air Force History and Museums Program, United States Air Force, Washington DC, 2004.
