= South Texas Center for Emerging Infectious Diseases =

American research center

Coordinates: 29°20′30.0042″N 98°26′6.66″W

The South Texas Center for Emerging Infectious Diseases (STCEID) was founded by the University of Texas at San Antonio at the former Brooks Air Force Base site in San Antonio, TX. Intended to become one of the preeminent centers for biodefense research in the nation to provide some assistance to the Centers for Disease Control and Prevention (CDC).

Bioterrorism is considered by some experts to be one of the greatest current threats to human health and National Security in the aftermath of September 11, 2001 and the anthrax mailings to Congress and news media. Founded by an increase in research funding for bioterrorism defense (biodefense), including development of vaccines, by the NIH and other government organizations. Fields of study at the Center include microbiology, virology, immunology, mycology, and genomics.

The major focus of the STCEID is to research emerging infectious diseases (i.e. cholera, SARS, anthrax, AIDS) and their mechanisms of pathogenesis. One of the main research issues is microorganisms that are potentially usable for biological warfare, like cholera, anthrax, ebola, etc.

Current Directors of the Center are: Karl Klose, Ph.D. and M. Neal Guentzel, Ph.D.
