= 311th Human Systems Wing =

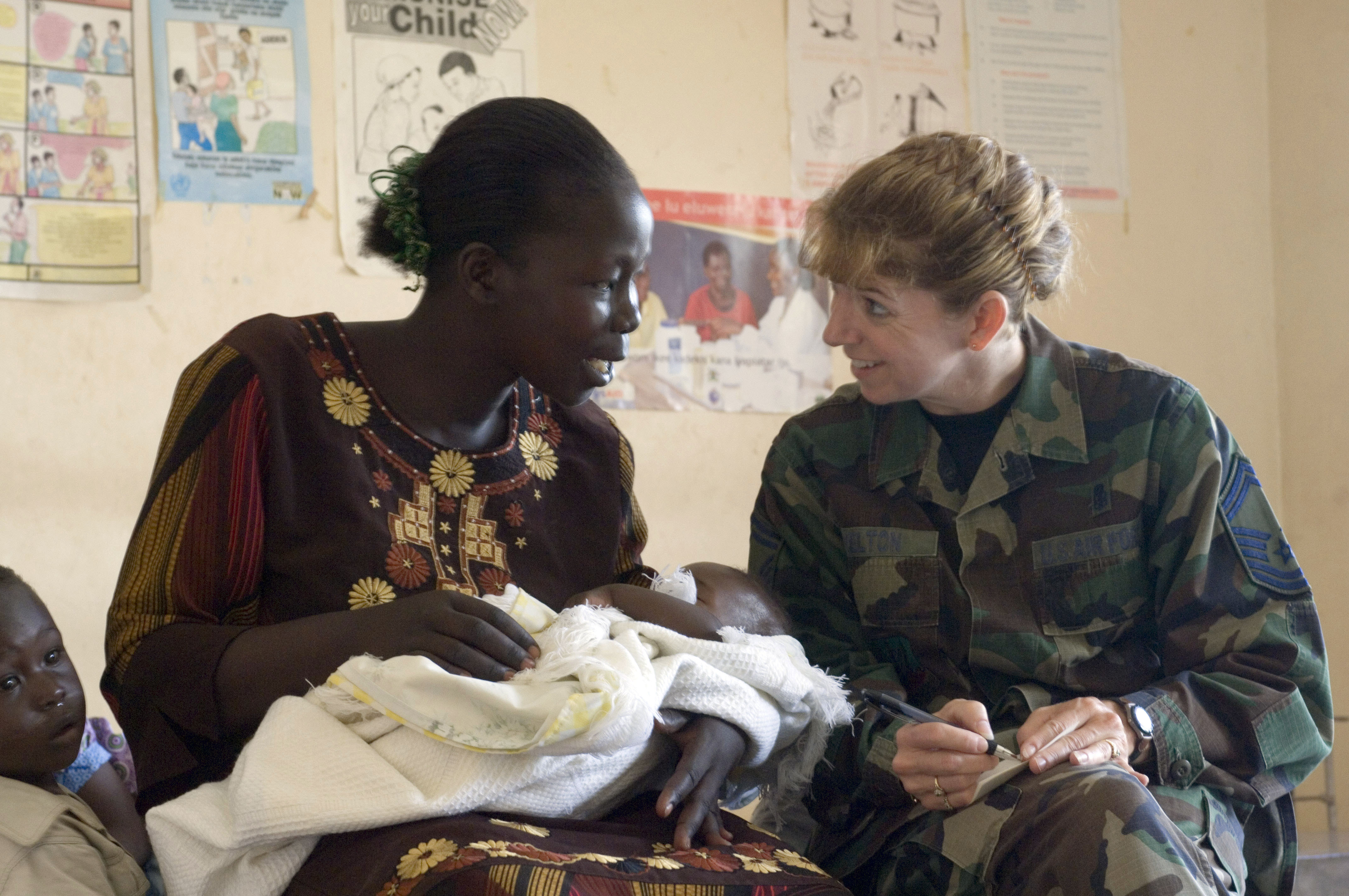
- An international health specialist of the 311th Human Systems Wing speaks with a woman in Uganda during exercise Natural Fire 2006.
- Active: 1961–2009
- Country: United States
- Branch: United States Air Force
- Role: Human factors research and development
- Part of: Air Force Materiel Command
- Mottos: Perscrutari, Docere. Mederi (Latin for 'Investigate, Teach, Heal') (1961–1974)
- Decorations: Air Force Outstanding Unit Award; Air Force Organizational Excellence Award

Insignia
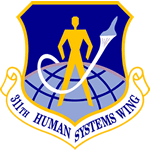
- 311th Human Systems Wing Emblem (Note: approved 25 September 1974, reinstated and modified 29 March 1994.)

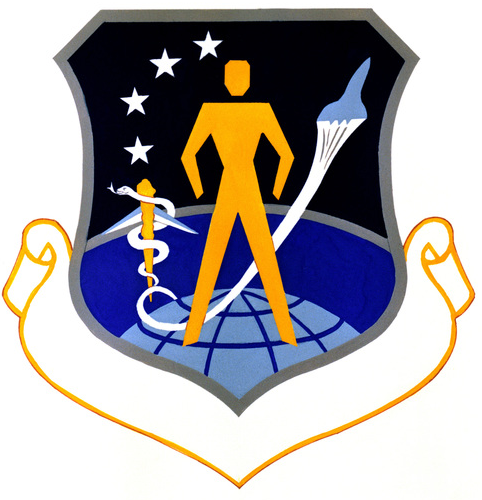
- Human Systems Division emblem (Note: Approved c. September 1987.)

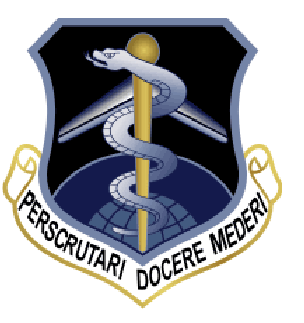
- Aerospace Medical Division emblem

The 311th Human Systems Wing is an inactive wing of the United States Air Force. It was stationed at Brooks City-Base in San Antonio, Texas. U.S. military air research into human factors and performance dates to 1918. The need for an integrated research centre was identified in 1946, but construction of facilities only began in 1957. The wing was established in October 1961 as the Aerospace Medical Division to bring aerospace medical research, education and clinical medicine under one headquarters.

== Organization ==
- Performance Enhancement Directorate

Included the Concept of Operations, Performance Enhancement Research and Warfighter Operations Divisions

- Air Force Institute of Operational Health

Included the Risk Analysis, Surveillance and Operations Directorates

== History ==
=== Background and predecessors ===
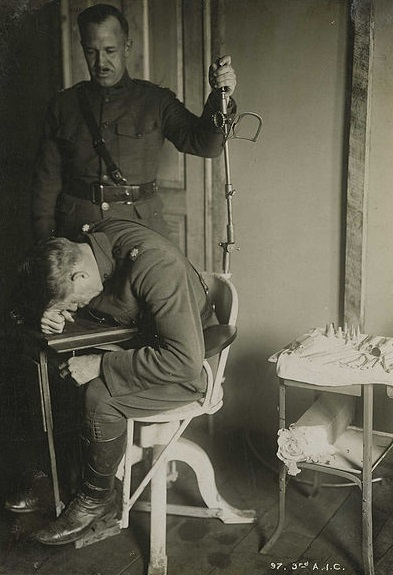
Spinning chair test of a pilot candidate

The 311th Human Systems Wings's origins can be traced to 19 January 1918, when the United States Army Air Service formed the Medical Research Laboratory at Hazelhurst Field, on Long Island, New York.. Hazelhurst was selected as the most important Army flying school on the east coast. Initial work at Hazelhurst included experiments with low pressure chambers and development of psychological profile tests. When Hazlehurst closed at the end of World War I, the laboratory moved to nearby Mitchel Field, where it combined with the School for Flight Surgeons. In 1922, the laboratory and school became School of Aviation Medicine and the focus became training flight surgeons, with experimentation limited to ways to improve their training. Four years later the School moved to San Antonio, Texas, where Air Corps flying training was now concentrated. It was first located at Brooks Field, the center of primary flight training. When Randolph Field opened as the "West Point of the Air" in October 1931 the school moved there. The school and its successors remained at Randolph until 1959, when they returned to Brooks, where the Aerospace Medical Center of Air Training Command was formed the same year.

Meanwhile, in 1935, a new laboratory was established at Wright Field, Ohio to investigate the harsh environment confronting military aviators. Its first commander was Captain Harry G. Armstrong, later United States Air Force Surgeon General. Among the laboratory's first significant research was that leading to the construction of practical pressurized cabins, In 1949 a Human Resources Research Center was established at Lackland Air Force Base, which developed classification and other tests, focusing on ways to improve personal effectiveness. However, some of these functions were under Air Training Command, while others fell under Air Research and Development Command, while the School of Aerospace Medicine was now part of Air University.

=== Single manager ===
Media related to 311th Human Systems Wing (United States Air Force) at Wikimedia Commons

Although the need for an Air Force Medical Center had been identified as early as 1946, it was not until 1957 that construction of facilities began at Brooks to bring these plans to fruition. Creating the Aerospace Medical Center was an initial step in placing aerospace medical research, education and clinical medicine under one headquarters. The center and its subordinate units were reassigned from Air Training Command to Air Force Systems Command, which formed the Aerospace Medical Division as the new headquarters, one that under various names would continue until 2009. This also represented a change in focus from fliers' medical needs to encompassing all life studies research. The division managed laboratories, a hospital, a clinic, and a school. It conducted aerospace medical research, provided medical care to United States Air Force personnel, and conducted medical education programs.

==== 1960s: Space and the Vietnam War ====
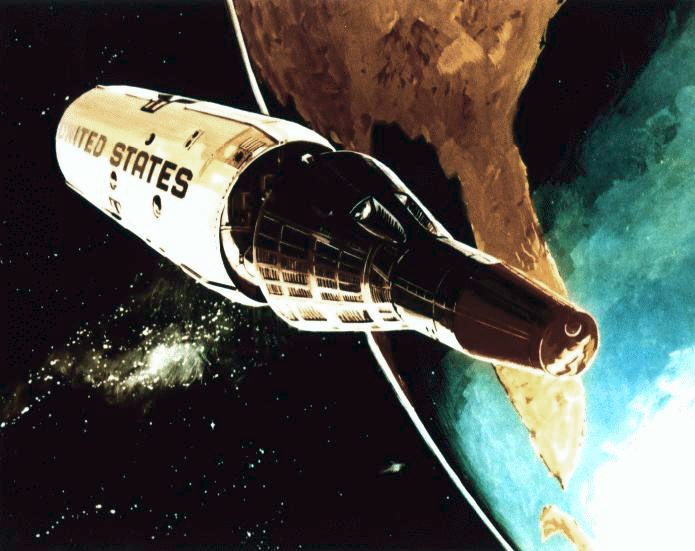
Illustration of USAF Manned Orbiting Laboratory

The division's medical testing was conducted not only for Air Force personnel, but also for NASA astronauts in Project Mercury. (Note: The name of the rhesus monkey used in the first test of a space capsule ejection system was Sam, for School of Aerospace Medicine. Alcott & Williford, p. 22.) Throughout Project Mercury, the division's medical facilities prepared astronauts for their missions and examined them after their return to earth. However, the expectation that the Aerospace Medical Division would be the "national center for aerospace medical studies" faded as NASA developed its own medical research facilities. By agreement with the Department of Defense, NASA took the lead in this area, although the division continued to participate in occasional projects. The division continued to take the lead in medical support for programs for which the Air Force was the lead agency, such as the Manned Orbiting Laboratory. (Note: This program was cancelled in 1969. Alcott & Williford, p. 42.) The transfer of space medicine to NASA made it apparent by 1970 that the facilities at Holloman Air Force Base were no longer cost effective, and the 6571st Aeromedical Research Laboratory was inactivated in December.

The War in Vietnam saw the division's School of Aerospace Medicine training load expand as the number of medical specialists in the Air Force grew. Courses were also added on tropical diseases and aeromedical evacuation. The division also kept a seven-person team in Saigon under the control of the Agency for International Development to augment civilian health services there. It helped develop body armor for aircrews of low and slow flying aircraft. More unusually, the division was involved with the initial development of lateral sighting techniques and the original FC-47 gunships.

==== 1970s: Occupational health ====
In the 1970s, the division's mission responsibilities expanded to include occupational and environmental health oversight for the Air Force, when occupational health laboratories at McClellan Air Force Base, California and Kelly Air Force Base, Texas were combined with a radiological laboratory at Wright-Patterson Air Force Base, into the Air Force Occupational and Environmental Health Laboratory at Brooks. In the following decade, the division's mission expanded beyond aeromedical research, and included development and fielding of biotechnology systems, doing not only research and testing but following through with the production of systems. Its hospital and clinic responsibilities, on the other hand were transferred to another organization.

==== 1980s: Human Systems Division ====
In 1986, the Department of Defense began streamlining its organization as a result of the Packard Commission recommendations. The division restructured its functional areas and was renamed the Human Systems Division on 6 February 1987. In December 1990, Air Force Systems Command consolidated its 16 laboratories nationwide into four. Brooks and the Human Systems Division became home of one of the "super labs," the Harry G. Armstrong Aerospace Medical Research Laboratory. On 1 July 1992, the division was renamed the Human Systems Center when the Air Force Systems Command and Air Force Logistics Command were combined into Air Force Materiel Command.

==== 1990s: Gulf War and conversion to a wing ====
During the Gulf War, the Human Systems Division provided technological support for Americans in Southwest Asia, including chemical warfare equipment. The division had conducted studies on chemical protective equipment as early as the mid-60s and established an operating location at the Army's Biomedical Laboratory at Edgewood Arsenal in 1981. In the 1990s, it served as the Air Force agent for human-centered research, development, acquisition, and specialized operational support.

In October 1997, the Air Force consolidated its four "super labs" into one lab, the Air Force Research Laboratory (AFRL), headquartered at Wright-Patterson Air Force Base, Ohio. The four laboratories' 25 directorates were streamlined into ten directorates. The Armstrong Laboratory's former functions and organizations at Brooks (minus some that were transferred to the Human Systems Center and U.S. Air Force School of Aerospace Medicine) became the Human Effectiveness Directorate of AFRL.

The reduced Human Systems Center was placed under the command of the Aeronautical Systems Center at Wright-Patterson a year later. On 1 October 1998, the center was redesignated the 311th Human Systems Wing. The wing focused on aerospace medicine, environmental safety, and occupational health programs for the Air Force.

On 5 October 2009 the 311th Human Systems Wing was inactivated and its 311th Mission Support Group became the 311th Air Base Group to manage the remaining Air Force operations at Brooks City-Base as the installation moved toward closure in September 2011 as directed by the 2005 Base Realignment and Closure Commission. The air base group provided oversight of closure functions, while some support functions were transferred to units at nearby Randolph and Lackland Air Force Bases.

=== Predecessor organizations ===
- Medical Research Laboratory (later Medical Research Laboratory and School for Flight Surgeons, School of Aviation Medicine, AAF School of Aviation Medicine), 19 January 1918 – 15 September 1944

Hazelhurst Field (1918–1919), Mitchel Field (1919–1926), Brooks Field (1926–1931) Randolph Field 1931–1944)

- 27th AAF Base Unit (AAF [later AF, USAF] School of Aviation Medicine), 15 September 1944 – 27 August 1948

Randolph Field (later Randolph Air Force Base)

- USAF School of Aviation Medicine (later USAF School of Aerospace Medicine), 27 August 1948 – 2 October 2009
- Aerospace Medical Center, 1 October 1959 – 15 April 1962

== Lineage ==
- Constituted as the Aerospace Medical Division on 1 November 1961, activated and organized

Redesignated Human Systems Division on 6 February 1987
Redesignated Human Systems Center on 1 July 1992
Redesignated 311th Human Systems Wing on 1 October 1998
Inactivated on 2 October 2009

=== Assignments ===
- Air Force Systems Command, 1 November 1951
- Air Force Materiel Command, 1 July 1992
- Aeronautical Systems Center, 1 October 1998 – 2 October 2009

=== Components ===
Centers

- Aerospace Medical Center, 1 November 1961 – 15 April 1962
- Wilford Hall USAF Medical Center (see USAF Hospital, Lackland)

Groups

- 70th Air Base Group: 1 October 1994 – 1 October 1998
- 311th Air Base Group (later 311th Mission Support Group): 1 October 1998 – 2 October 2009
- 6570th Air Base Group (later 648th Support Group, 648th Air Base Group): 1 November 1961 – 1 October 1994

Medical care units

- USAF Hospital, Lackland (later Wilford Hall USAF Hospital, Wilford Hall USAF Medical Center): Attached 1 November 1961, assigned 15 April 1962 – 1 January 1987
- 6570th USAF Dispensary: 1 November 1966 – 1 December 1970
- USAF Dispensary, Brooks (later USAF Clinic, Brooks): 1 December 1970 – c. 16 February 1987

School

- USAF School of Aerospace Medicine: 1 November 1961 – 2 October 2009

Laboratories

- 6570th Aerospace Medical Research Laboratory: 1 December 1961 – 8 September 1979
- 6570th Personnel Research Laboratory: 1 December 1961 – 8 September 1979

Lackland Air Force Base, Texas

- 6571st Aeromedical Research Laboratory: 1 December 1961 – 31 December 1970

Holloman Air Force Base, New Mexico

- Air Force Aerospace Medical Research Laboratory: 8 September 1979 – December 1990

Lackland Air Force Base, Texas

- Air Force Drug Testing Laboratory: 14 January 1985 – 1 December 1990
- Air Force Epidemiology Laboratory: 1 December 1961 – unknown

Lackland Air Force Base, Texas

- Air Force Human Resources Research Laboratory (later Harry G. Armstrong Aerospace Medical Research Laboratory): 1 March 1983 – 1 October 1997
- Air Force Occupational and Environmental Health Laboratory: 30 September 1976 – December 1990
- Air Force Personnel Research Laboratory: 1 December 1961 – 8 September 1979

Wright-Patterson Air Force Base, Ohio

- Arctic Aeromedical Laboratory: 1 November 1961 – 30 June 1967 (Note: The division commander, General Bedwell, determined that the cost of maintaining a separate facility for Arctic testing was excessive, and that cold weather tests be conducted on an ad hoc basis. Alcott & Williford, pp. 46–47.)

Ladd Air Force Base, Alaska

Flight

- 5th Epidemiological flight, 1 November 1961 – 8 February 1966

Clark Air Base, Philippines

=== Stations ===
- Brooks Air Force Base, Texas (later Brooks City-Base), 1 November 1961 – 2 October 2009

=== Awards ===
Award streamer	Award	Dates	Notes
	Air Force Outstanding Unit Award	1 January 2000 – 31 December 2000	311th Human Systems Wing
	Air Force Outstanding Unit Award	1 January 2001 – 31 December 2001	311th Human Systems Wing
	Air Force Outstanding Unit Award	1 January 2003 – 31 December 2003	311th Human Systems Wing
	Air Force Outstanding Unit Award	1 January 2004 – 31 December 2004	311th Human Systems Wing
	Air Force Outstanding Unit Award	1 January 2008 – 31 December 2008	311th Human Systems Wing
	Air Force Organizational Excellence Award	1 July 1984 – 30 June 1986	Aereospace Medical Division
	Air Force Organizational Excellence Award	1 December 1988 – 1 April 1989	Human Systems Division
	Air Force Organizational Excellence Award	13 December 1990 – 1 April 1992	Human Systems Division

== See also ==
- 711th Human Performance Wing
