= Gregory A. Biscone =

United States Air Force general

Lieutenant General Gregory A. Biscone
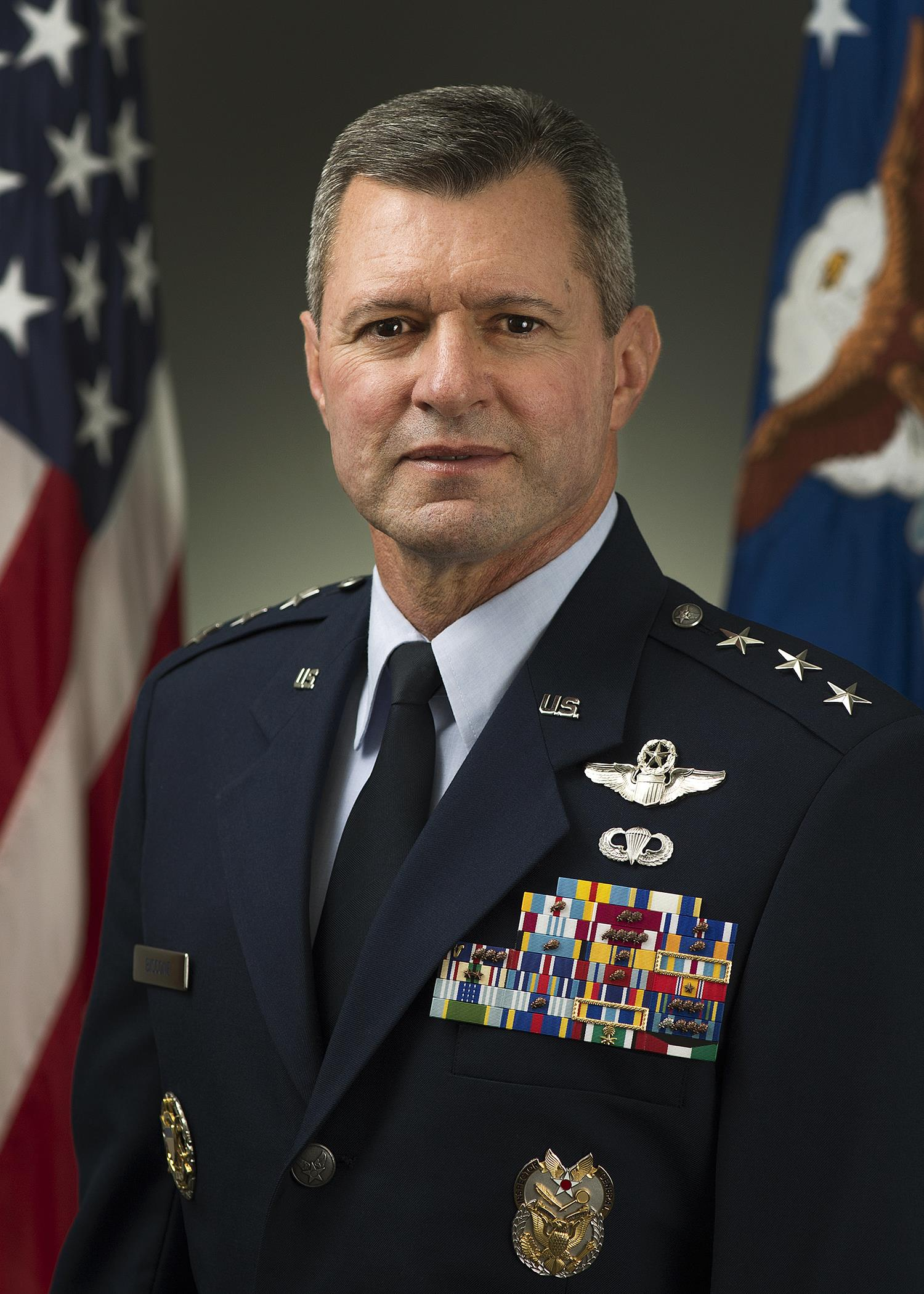
- Military career
- Allegiance: United States of America
- Branch: United States Air Force
- Service years: 1981–2016
- Rank: Lieutenant general
- Commands: Inspector General of the Air Force; Office of the Defense Representative, U.S. Embassy, Pakistan; 509th Bomb Wing; 5th Bomb Wing
- Conflicts: Gulf War; Operation Enduring Freedom; Iraq War
- Awards: Defense Distinguished Service Medal; Air Force Distinguished Service Medal; Defense Superior Service Medal (2); Legion of Merit (3)

Gregory A. Biscone is a retired lieutenant general of the U.S. Air Force. He last served as the Inspector General of the Air Force assigned within the Office of the Secretary of the Air Force, Washington, D.C., and retired on 1 July 2016.

Biscone is a 1981 distinguished graduate of the U.S. Air Force Academy. His assignments include combat crew instructor duty and wing command in the B-52; squadron, group and wing command in the B-2; advanced systems acquisition; and aide to the Commander, Air Combat Command. He also led the Joint Staff's Force Integration Branch, directed the Headquarters U.S. Executive Secretariat, and served as ACC's assistant director of air and space operations. He has also been deputy director of operations, U.S. Central Command, and director of Air Force Quadrennial Defense Review, Headquarters U.S. Air Force.

Biscone commanded expeditionary forces and flew B-52 missions in Operations Desert Storm and Enduring Freedom. He also commanded B-2 actions in support of Operation Iraqi Freedom with strikes from both continental United States and deployed locations. He is a command pilot with more than 3,800 hours.

Previous to being the IG, he was commander of the Office of the Defense Representative, Pakistan. He was the senior military representative in Pakistan and in concert with the U.S. Embassy Country Team, promoted and enhanced U.S. security goals by assisting Pakistan military counterinsurgency efforts by building capacity and developing relationships with Pakistan military to strengthen and perpetuate a resilient and mutually beneficial defense relationship with Pakistan. From 2014 to 2016, as IG, he reported to the Secretary and Chief of Staff of the Air Force on matters concerning Air Force effectiveness, efficiency, and the military discipline of active duty, Air Force Reserve and Air National Guard forces.

== Flight information ==
Rating: Command pilot
Flight hours: More than 3,800
Aircraft flown: T-38, B-52, B-2

== Education ==
- 1981 Bachelor's degree in economics, United States Air Force Academy, Colorado Springs, Colorado
- 1986 Squadron Officer School, Maxwell AFB, Alabama
- 1992 Master of Business Administration degree in aviation, Embry-Riddle Aeronautical University, Florida
- 1993 Air Command and Staff College, Maxwell AFB, Alabama
- 1999 Master's degree in national security strategy, National War College, Fort Lesley J. McNair, Washington, D.C.
- 2001 Senior Executive Fellowship, Harvard University, Cambridge, Massachusetts

== Assignments ==
- July 1981 – August 1982, student, undergraduate pilot training, Laughlin AFB, Texas
- August 1982 – December 1982, student, Combat Crew Training School, Carswell AFB, Texas
- January 1983 – July 1985, line and evaluator co-pilot, 60th Bomb Squadron, Andersen AFB, Guam
- August 1985 – July 1988, aircraft commander, squadron flight scheduler, instructor pilot and Chief of Bomber Training, 416th Bomb Wing, Griffiss AFB, New York
- August 1988 – September 1991, line instructor, aircraft commander, standards and evaluations pilot, and Strategic Air Command instrument school instructor pilot, 93rd Bomb Wing, Castle AFB, California
- September 1991 – June 1992, acquisition officer, Headquarters SAC, Offutt AFB, Nebraska
- August 1992 – June 1993, student, Air Command and Staff College, Maxwell AFB, Alabama
- July 1993 – July 1995, aide to the commander of Air Combat Command, Langley AFB, Virginia
- August 1995 – March 1997, operations officer, 393rd Bomb Squadron, Whiteman AFB, Missouri
- April 1997 – June 1998, commander of 393rd Bomb Squadron, Whiteman AFB, Missouri
- August 1998 – June 1999, student, National War College, Fort Lesley J. McNair, Washington, D.C.
- June 1999 – April 2001, chief of Force Integration Branch, Joint Staff, the Pentagon, Washington, D.C.
- April 2001 – December 2001, director, Executive Secretariat, Headquarters U.S. Air Force, Washington, D.C.
- December 2001 – July 2003, commander of 509th Operations Group, Whiteman AFB, Missouri
- July 2003 – June 2005, commander of 5th Bomb Wing, Minot AFB, North Dakota
- June 2005 – May 2006, assistant director of air and space operations, Headquarters ACC, Langley AFB, Virginia
- May 2006 – September 2007, commander of 509th Bomb Wing, Whiteman AFB, Missouri
- September 2007 – May 2009, deputy director of operations, U.S. Central Command, MacDill Air Force Base, Florida
- May 2009 – February 2010, director of Air Force Quadrennial Defense Review, Office of the Assistant Vice Chief of Staff, Headquarters U.S. Air Force, Washington, D.C.
- February 2010 – February 2011, chief of staff, Secretary of Defense Comprehensive Review Working Group, Washington, D.C.
- February 2011 – January 2013, director of global operations, U.S. Strategic Command, Offutt AFB, Nebraska
- January 2013 – August 2014, commander of Office of the Defense Representative, Pakistan, U.S. Embassy, Islamabad, Pakistan
- August 2014 – May 2016, Inspector General of the Air Force, Office of the Secretary of the Air Force, Washington, D.C

== Awards and decorations ==
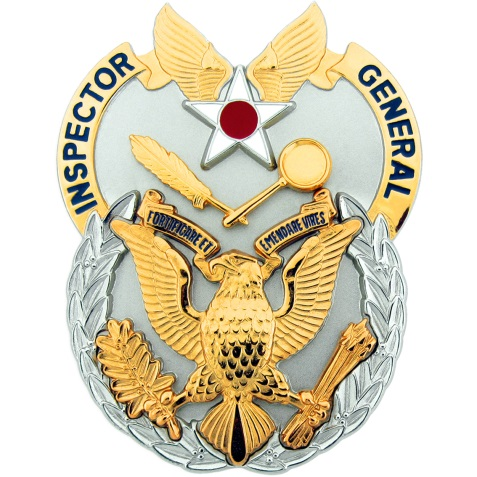
Command Pilot Badge
Basic Parachutist Badge
Air Force Inspector General Badge
Joint Chiefs of Staff Identification Badge

Defense Distinguished Service Medal
Air Force Distinguished Service Medal
Defense Superior Service Medal with one bronze oak leaf cluster
Legion of Merit with two oak leaf clusters
Distinguished Flying Cross with oak leaf cluster
Defense Meritorious Service Medal
Meritorious Service Medal with four oak leaf clusters
Air Medal with oak leaf cluster
Aerial Achievement Medal with oak leaf cluster
Air Force Commendation Medal with oak leaf cluster
Joint Meritorious Unit Award
Air Force Outstanding Unit Award with Valor device and three bronze oak leaf clusters
Air Force Outstanding Unit Award (second ribbon to denote fifth award)
Combat Readiness Medal with oak leaf cluster
National Defense Service Medal with bronze service star
Southwest Asia Service Medal with two service stars
Global War on Terrorism Expeditionary Medal
Global War on Terrorism Service Medal
Nuclear Deterrence Operations Service Medal with three oak leaf clusters
Air Force Overseas Short Tour Service Ribbon
Air Force Overseas Long Tour Service Ribbon with oak leaf cluster
Air Force Expeditionary Service Ribbon with gold frame
Air Force Longevity Service Award with silver and three bronze oak leaf clusters
Small Arms Expert Marksmanship Ribbon
Air Force Training Ribbon
Kuwait Liberation Medal (Saudi Arabia)
Kuwait Liberation Medal (Kuwait)

== Effective dates of promotion ==
- Second lieutenant May 27, 1981
- First lieutenant May 27, 1983
- Captain May 27, 1985
- Major April 1, 1993
- Lieutenant colonel January 1, 1997
- Colonel April 1, 2001
- Brigadier general August 1, 2007
- Major general May 19, 2010
- Lieutenant general January 12, 2013

Military offices
Preceded by Stephen P. Mueller	Inspector General of the United States Air Force; August 2014 – May 2016	Succeeded by Anthony J. Rock
