= Nicholas Kehoe =

United States Air Force general

Nicholas B. Kehoe
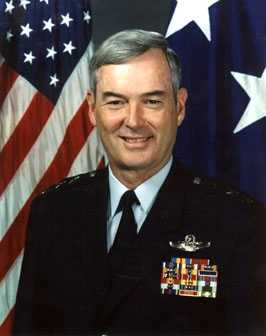
- LtGen Nicholas Kehoe
- Born: May 28, 1943; Langley Field, Virginia
- Died: December 18, 2022; Falls Church, Virginia
- Burial place: Arlington National Cemetery
- Military career
- Allegiance: United States of America
- Branch: United States Air Force
- Service years: 1966–2000
- Rank: Lieutenant General
- Commands: 12th Flying Training Wing; Nineteenth Air Force; Inspector General, USAF
- Conflicts: Vietnam War
- Awards: Defense Distinguished Service Medal (2); Distinguished Service Medal; Legion of Merit (2); Distinguished Flying Cross (3)
- Other work: HUD, Asst. Inspector General; Congressional Medal of Honor Foundation, CEO & President

Nicholas Bernard Kehoe III (May 28, 1943 – December 18, 2022) was a lieutenant general in the United States Air Force (USAF) who served as a fighter pilot during the Vietnam War. His last active duty assignment was as the Inspector General of the Air Force, Office of the Secretary of the Air Force. After over 34 years of military service, Kehoe continued in public service as the Assistant Inspector General in the U.S. Department of Housing and Urban Development (HUD). As of March 1, 2003, he became the President and CEO of the Medal of Honor Society.

== Air Force career ==
Raised in Rochester, New York, Kehoe graduated from the United States Air Force Academy in 1966 with a Bachelor of Science degree. He was commissioned a second lieutenant on June 8, 1966.

Kehoe was a command pilot with over 3,600 hours of flight hours in the T-37 Tweet, T-38 Talon, F-4 Phantom II, F-15 Eagle and other aircraft. During the Vietnam War, he served two combat tours, earning the Distinguished Flying Cross and 28 Air Medals.

In September 1998, Kehoe became the inspector general, Office of the Secretary of the Air Force, the Pentagon, Washington, D.C. — overseeing USAF inspection policy; criminal investigations; counterintelligence operations; the complaints and fraud, waste and abuse programs; intelligence oversight; and two field operating agencies, the Air Force Inspection Agency and the Air Force Office of Special Investigations.

General Kehoe retired from the United States Air Force on October 1, 2000, after over 34 years of service. He died at the age of 79 on December 18, 2022.

=== Summary of assignments ===
1. September 1966 - September 1967, student, undergraduate pilot training, Williams Air Force Base, Arizona
2. September 1967 - June 1968, student, F-4 combat crew training, Davis-Monthan Air Force Base, Arizona, and George Air Force Base, California
3. June 1968 - June 1969, F-4 pilot, 555th Tactical Fighter Squadron, Udon Royal Thai Air Force Base, Thailand
4. June 1969 - February 1970, F-4 upgrade training, George Air Force Base, California
5. February 1970 - March 1971, F-4 pilot, 390th Tactical Fighter Squadron, Da Nang Air Base, Republic of Vietnam
6. March 1971 - December 1973, T-38 instructor pilot and assistant chief, Wing Operations Division, Williams Air Force Base, Arizona
7. December 1973 - December 1976, staff officer and chief, Airspace and Air Traffic Control Division, Directorate of Training, Headquarters Air Training Command, Randolph Air Force Base, Texas
8. December 1976 - December 1978, chief of training, 86th Tactical Fighter Group, and operations officer, 512th Tactical Fighter Squadron, Ramstein Air Base, West Germany
9. December 1978 - June 1979, student, Royal Air Force Air War College, RAF Cranwell, England
10. June 1979 - August 1981, senior USAF adviser to British Joint Warfare Wing, National Defense College, Latimer House, Latimer, England
11. August 1981 - September 1983, director of social actions, Headquarters Tactical Air Command (TAC), Langley Air Force Base, Virginia
12. September 1983 - January 1986, deputy commander for operations and vice commander, 1st Tactical Fighter Wing, Langley Air Force Base, Virginia
13. January 1986 - October 1986, director of inspection, Office of the Inspector General, Headquarters TAC, Langley Air Force Base, Virginia
14. October 1986 - August 1988, vice commander and commander, 12th Flying Training Wing, Randolph Air Force Base, Texas
15. August 1988 - May 1990, assistant deputy chief of staff for plans and requirements, Headquarters Air Training Command, Randolph Air Force Base, Texas
16. May 1990 - July 1992, deputy director for regional plans and policy, Office of the Deputy Chief of Staff for Plans and Operations, Headquarters USAF, the Pentagon, Washington, D.C.
17. July 1992 - October 1994, assistant chief of staff for operations and logistics, Supreme Headquarters Allied Powers Europe, Mons, Belgium
18. October 1994 - November 1995, commander, 19th Air Force, Randolph Air Force Base, Texas
19. November 1995 - September 1998, deputy chairman, North Atlantic Treaty Organization Military Committee, Headquarters NATO, Brussels, Belgium
20. September 1998 - October 2000, Inspector General, Office of the Secretary of the Air Force, the Pentagon, Washington, D.C.

=== Promotion record ===
- Second Lieutenant Jun 8, 1966
- First Lieutenant Dec 8, 1967
- Captain Jun 1, 1969
- Major Mar 1, 1975
- Lieutenant Colonel Apr 1, 1978
- Colonel Sept 1, 1982
- Brigadier General Jun 1, 1990
- Major General Dec 1, 1992
- Lieutenant General Oct 31, 1995

=== Awards and decorations ===
Command Pilot Badge

Defense Distinguished Service Medal with one bronze oak leaf cluster
Air Force Distinguished Service Medal
Legion of Merit with oak leaf cluster
Distinguished Flying Cross with two oak leaf clusters
Meritorious Service Medal with three oak leaf clusters
Air Medal with twenty-seven oak leaf clusters
(second ribbon necessary due to accoutrement spacing)
Air Force Commendation Medal with oak leaf cluster
Air Force Presidential Unit Citation
Air Force Outstanding Unit Award with Valor device and three oak leaf clusters
Air Force Organizational Excellence Award with oak leaf cluster
Combat Readiness Medal with oak leaf cluster
National Defense Service Medal with one bronze service star
Vietnam Service Medal with seven service stars
Air Force Overseas Short Tour Service Ribbon with oak leaf cluster
Air Force Overseas Long Tour Service Ribbon with two oak leaf clusters
Air Force Longevity Service Award with silver and two bronze oak leaf clusters
Small Arms Expert Marksmanship Ribbon with service star
Air Force Training Ribbon
Vietnam Gallantry Cross Unit Citation
Vietnam Campaign Medal

== Notes ==
Military offices
Preceded by Richard T. Swope	Inspector General of the United States Air Force; September 1998 – 2000	Succeeded by Raymond P. Huot
