= Norman C. Gaddis =

United States general (1923–2024)

Brigadier General Norman Carl Gaddis
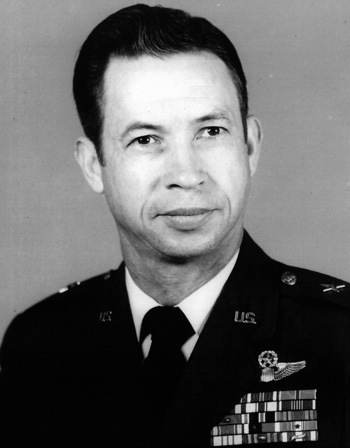
- Born: September 30, 1923; Dandridge, Tennessee, U.S.
- Died: February 13, 2024 (aged 100)
- Spouse: Hazel Lee Ketner
- Military career
- Allegiance: United States of America
- Service: United States Army Air Corps; United States Air Force
- Service years: 1942–1945; 1949–1976
- Rank: Brigadier General
- Nicknames: "Norm", "Snapper", "Snap"
- Major conflicts during time in service: World War II; Berlin Air Lift; Korean War; Vietnam War
- Awards: Command Pilot; Air Force Distinguished Service Medal; Silver Star (OLC); Legion of Merit; Distinguished Flying Cross; Bronze Star Medal (OLC and "V" Device); Purple Heart Medal (OLC); Air Medal (5 OLC); Air Force Commendation Medal; Army Commendation Medal; Air Force Outstanding Unit Award; Prisoner of War Medal; Combat Readiness Medal; Good Conduct Medal; American Theater Medal; World War II Victory Medal; Army of Occupation Medal; National Defense Service Medal (OLC); Vietnam Service Medal (16); Air Force Longevity Service Award (7); Republic of Vietnam Gallantry Cross with palm; Vietnam Campaign Medal

Norman Carl Gaddis (September 30, 1923 – February 13, 2024) was a United States Air Force officer, fighter pilot and prisoner of war. At the time he was shot down over North Vietnam, Gaddis was the most senior United States Air Force officer (Colonel).

== Early life ==
Norman was born September 30, 1923, on his grandparents' family farm in Dandridge, Tennessee. His early years were affected by the Great Depression including frequent moves by his parents, Bruce and Allie, to find work and suitable housing. His mother was hospitalized for tuberculosis in 1928 and in order for his father to continue to work, Gaddis; his 7-year-old brother Ralph; and 1-year-old sister; Opal, were placed in an orphanage until the sanatorium had an apartment for the family.

== Military service in Army Air Corps ==
During his time at Knoxville High School Gaddis was very involved in Junior ROTC. Because of the Pearl Harbor bombing in December 1941 his older brother, Ralph was drafted in July 1942. On October 29, 1942, he volunteered for active military service and was sworn in at Camp Forrest, Tennessee. He was issued uniforms and shoes and moved to his first duty station at Page Field Army Airfield in Fort Myers, Florida. While his first assignment included being a mechanic for the B-26 Marauder airplane, his duties also included the typical soldiering activities. His first flight was as a passenger in the B-26. His wing moved to Avon Park AAF (present day Avon Park Air Force Range) in Avon Park, Florida, before the end of the year.

In 1943 Gaddis was accepted into the aviation cadet program. After training at Biloxi, Mississippi; State Teachers College at Eau Claire, Wisconsin; and Ryan School for Aeronautics and Cal-Aero Flying Academy, both in California, Gaddis was sent to advance training in the T-6 Texan aircraft at Williams Army Airfield, Arizona. In November 1944 Gaddis graduated from pilot training and was commissioned as a 2nd Lieutenant in the Army Air Corps Reserve.

On January 10, 1945, Gaddis married Hazel Lee Ketner, his high school sweetheart, in the study of the First Baptist Church in Panama City, Florida.

His first assignment was at Luke Army Airfield, Arizona, flying the P-40 Warhawk. In 1945 he was transferred to Dale Mabry Army Airfield, Florida, and then on to Bartow Army Airfield, Florida. He flew the P-40 and the P-51 Mustang. At the end of World War II he was released from active duty.

== Civilian Life in Tennessee ==
The Gaddises returned to Knoxville in November 1945. Gaddis enrolled in the pre-med program at the University of Tennessee, served in the Army Air Forces Reserve, and worked part-time in a large drugstore. The Reserve unit aircraft included the C-47 Skytrain and the P-51 Mustang. After their first child was born in March 1946, Gaddis found the schedule extremely demanding. There were several opportunities for him to return to active duty, especially with the establishment of the US Air Force in September 1947; however, even with almost 500 hours of flight time, he did not meet the criterion of a college degree.

== Military service in the Air Force ==
Gaddis was recalled to active duty in February 1949. He served three years as a pilot with the 86th Fighter Wing at Neubiberg Air Base, West Germany, a suburb of Munich. The 86th Fighter Wing was engaged in flying escort missions into and from Berlin during the airlift, typically flying the P-47 Thunderbolt. During this time Gaddis was promoted to 1st Lieutenant and earned the call sign "Snapper" because of his execution of a "snap-roll" maneuver as he flew a P-47 at 1,500 feet (460 m) and 300 mph across the Fürstenfeldbruck airfield.

=== Operation Peter Fox One ===
In March 1952 Gaddis was transferred to the 309th Fighter Squadron, 31st Fighter Wing at Turner Air Force Base, Georgia where he flew the F-84 Thunderjet. He also attended 6 weeks of Fighter Weapon School at Nellis Air Force Base in Nevada. While assigned to the 31st Wing, which was a Nuclear Weapons unit, he participated in Operation Fox Peter One, the first jet fighter crossing of the Pacific Ocean. This was historic because it included the first mass movement of jet fighters across the Pacific, the first mass mid-air refueling of jet fighters, the longest mass movement of a complete jet fighter wing by air and the longest mass nonstop over water flight by jets (from Travis Air Force Base in California to Hawaii). This deployment included a 3-month special mission to Chitose Air Base in Japan. The 31st Fighter Wing was awarded the Distinguished Unit Award for this historic flight.

Though officially stationed at Turner, Gaddis spent much of 1953 training at various places including Squadron Officers School at Maxwell Air Force Base, Alabama, Nuclear Weapons School at Kirtland Air Force Base, New Mexico, survival training in the Okefenokee Swamp in Florida and gunnery training at MacDill Air Force Base, Florida. In November Gaddis had a second classified deployment to Misawa Air Base, Japan.

=== Europe Duty ===
In May 1954 Gaddis was reassigned to the 81st Fighter Wing, RAF Bentwaters, England, as the Wing Standardization Officer. This assignment included duty at Sheppard's Grove flying the F-86A Sabre. While he was there the wing converted to the F-84F Thunderstreak, a nuclear weapons carrier.

In late 1955 Gaddis was transferred to Headquarters, U.S. Air Forces in Europe at Wiesbaden, West Germany. He served as an operations staff officer in the Standardization Division. While there he had temporary duty at Edwards Air Force Base, California, to conduct performance testing on a new airplane, the F-100D Super Sabre. During this time he worked with test pilots Chuck Yeager, Deke Slayton, Ivan Kincheloe, Jim Carson and Lou Shalk.

In May 1957 Gaddis moved to Foster Air Force Base, Texas, to serve with the 450th Fighter Wing as the Squadron Operations Officer.

In April 1958 Gaddis was assigned to the U.S. Air Forces Fighter Weapons School, Nellis Air Force Base, Nevada, where he flew the F-100D as a flight instructor and later served as the Director of Operations and Training. In 1960 he was selected for and attended the Air Command and Staff College at Maxwell Air Force Base, Alabama.

In July 1961 Major Gaddis was assigned to Headquarters, U.S. Air Force Directorate of Operations as a staff officer in the Tactical Division. During this time he had the opportunity to brief the Chief of Staff, General Curtis LeMay.

=== Vietnam ===
During the 1965–66 academic year Gaddis attended the National War College at Fort Lesley J. McNair in Washington, DC. From there he transitioned to MacDill Air Force Base, to attend F-4 Phantom II combat crew training. Gaddis was promoted to colonel on October 20, 1966. He also received orders for an assignment as the Assistant Deputy for Operations, 12th Tactical Fighter Wing at Cam Ranh Air Base, South Vietnam. Cam Ranh was a main staging base for 24/7 military airlift flights and support included medical evacuations and civilian contract flights, both arrivals and departures. As a senior officer he also flew combat missions in South and North Vietnam.

Early in 1967 the Viet Cong conducted rocket attacks against the American air bases in South Vietnam. General William W. Momyer, the Seventh Air Force commander, was concerned that some of the senior officers might be injured or killed in the attacks. To become familiar with the flight operations senior officers were temporarily assigned to other bases. As part of this plan Gaddis was sent to Danang Air Base, South Vietnam and Korat Royal Thai Air Force Base in Thailand to fly missions with the F-4 wing.

While at Danang Gaddis and 11 other pilots were scheduled to fly a mission against a target in the southwest part of Hanoi. After completing a briefing Gaddis began his 73rd combat mission. Lt. James Jefferson was his weapons officer. They took off in the F-4 Phantom at 15:00 on May 12. The pilots proceeded to a rendezvous point with a KC-135 tanker aircraft over Laos. After all the fighters completed their refueling, Gaddis's flight joined with eighteen other aircraft loaded with bombs. Their target was a boat manufacturing plant in the southwest edge of Hanoi near the border of Hà Tây and Hòa Bình Provinces. As the strike forces approached the target, the North Vietnamese began to fire surface-to-air missiles and anti-aircraft guns. One of the missiles exploded near Gaddis's aircraft and pieces of metal debris were sucked into the left engine. The engine then exploded and set the aircraft on fire. According to North Vietnamese records, Gaddis' F-4C (AF Ser. No. 63–7614) did not fall to a SAM, but instead was shot down by a MiG-17 pilot of the 923rd Fighter Regiment, Ngo Duc Mai. The aircraft began to rotate end-over-end. Gaddis ordered the copilot to eject and immediately heard two loud explosions, presumably the sound of the Jefferson's canopy separation and the ejection seat. Gaddis ejected while the plane was upside down. He was captured immediately. During this time, Gaddis did not see Jefferson's parachute. Later, Gaddis was shown Jefferson's nametag, which had been cut from his flight suit, and two other items of flight equipment, his helmet and his clipboard. All items were in good shape without burns or bloodstains. Apparently, he was killed during the ejection or immediately after he landed. Partial remains of Jefferson were repatriated July 14, 1999, and positive identification was announced June 5, 2000.

=== Internment as a POW ===
Gaddis was the first Air Force colonel to survive a bailout and capture in North Vietnam. He was taken immediately to the Hỏa Lò Prison, known as the "Hanoi Hilton." When he refused to give the Vietnamese information he was subjected to brutal torture. After three weeks of interrogation Gaddis was placed in a small cell, seven-feet square, and remained in solitary confinement for 1004 consecutive days. After two years and seven months he was allowed to write a letter to his family and was allowed to receive a package from family containing toilet articles, candy, and some underclothes.

At the end of solitary confinement, another Air Force Colonel was placed in the cell with Gaddis. Four months later these two were allowed to live with two other Air Force colonels in a larger cell. The prisoners were not supposed to communicate with others, but they did so using a Tap code messaging system improvised by the prisoners as well as scratching on the bottoms of containers. They learned that about 200 Americans were being held in the prison.

During this time the American prisoners were not brutally tortured but were slapped, kicked and punched in the kidneys by the guards. The food was limited, and each of the four had lost 30 to 35 pounds since being captured. Occasionally they were allowed packages from their families and these items were shared. If families sent pictures the guards only allowed the prisoners to keep them for a few days; letters were taken in the same manner.

The senior officers at the Hanoi Hilton organized a provisional unit, the 4th Allied Prisoner of War Wing. It was composed of all United States branches - Air Force, Army, Navy and Marine Corps - as well as allied prisoners from South Vietnam and Thailand and was led by Colonels John P. Flynn and Robinson Risner. The groups communicated using tabs, signals and codes.

During this period there were about ten prisons within a 15 miles (24 km) radius of Hanoi. In an effort to consolidate the prisoners for better control approximately two hundred American prisoners were moved to a camp 5 miles (8.0 km) from the Chinese border. The senior officers remained at the Hanoi Hilton.

In November 1970, following the unsuccessful Son Tay Raid, the North Vietnamese consolidated most of the prisoners into the one Hanoi location. This allowed additional contact and it was soon learned that there were almost 500 prisoners, most of them officers.

Twice each day the Vietnamese had a propaganda program on the camp radio. The goal was to convince the prisoners that the Vietnamese were winning the war. From this broadcast the prisoners learned about the Paris meetings between the Vietnamese and Americans. They also learned more about the April 1972 bombing of Haiphong Harbor where Soviet ships were docked. Gaddis and other prisoners were then physically dragged through the Hanoi Museum in July to see some of the bomb casings and other munitions dropped by the bombers.

In August 1972 the prisoners sensed that something positive was happening when they received physical examinations including chest x-rays. The prisoners were invited to write a statement detailing their injuries. By this time torture was only given for flagrant violations of camp regulations.

In October 1972 a Vietnamese Political Officer came into the senior officer compound and said that the war would end soon. However, in a blow to prisoner morale, the Vietnamese recalled their delegation from the Paris Peace Talks in early November.

In late November the guards gave each prisoner a notebook and pencil for academic study purposes; it was not to be used for politics. The books were collected every few days to see what the "blackest of criminals" were writing about. The prisoners were also given a Bible to read and study for a week. The prisoners surmised from this generosity that something had to be happening somewhere.

Just after dark on 18 December 1972 the prisoners heard the unmistakable sound of bomb blasts over Hanoi which indicated the start of Operation Linebacker II. The number of blasts and the firing of surface-to-air missiles indicated that these were B-52 bombers. As they began to cheer the crews, the guards burst into the compound and pressed bayonets into their backs ordering them to get under the wooden beds. As soon as the guards left the prisoners were back at the openings. The bombing lasted all night long. At daylight the bombing stopped – but started again the next night. Every night, except Christmas, the bombs dropped until suddenly stopping at midnight on December 29. These raids included up to 129 B-52s. Soon, the camp radio announced that the Vietnamese delegation had returned to Paris.

On Christmas Day 1972 Joe Kittinger, a friend from the days at Neubiberg and internationally known for his balloon jumps as part of Project Excelsior, ended up in the cell for senior officers for a few days. He had been shot down on 11 May 1972.

=== Operation Homecoming ===
On 29 January 1973 Gaddis was one of 29 senior officer prisoners brought together to receive a copy of the Release Agreement. For most, this was the first time these officers had actually met each other. According to protocol, the first POWs to be released would be the sick and wounded; however, the Vietnamese would not allow these to be designated by the POWs themselves.

The senior officers made the decision that military bearing, structure and rules would be followed. If any of the prisoners could not walk, they were to be carried by Americans, not the Vietnamese. The release sequence would be by order of capture, starting with the first person. It was mandated that every POW must know the name and capture date of the person ahead of them. If the Vietnamese did not follow sequence, everything would come to a standstill; thus, making sure no one would be left behind.

According to protocol, each group would total about 150 POWs. The first group of POWs would be released on 12 February 1973; the second group released fourteen days later, and so on until the nearly 600 prisoners were released. Navy Captain James B. Stockdale was the senior officer of the first group, and the first POW in the formation was Navy Lieutenant Commander Everett Alvarez who had been captured on 5 August 1964. This first group also included Colonel Risner. The POWs were issued a pair of dark trousers, a lighter colored shirt, a pair of black shoes and a light windbreaker. They had the option of taking their personal belongings, such as letters and pictures, in a small hand bag.

Gaddis was the senior officer of the second group. He was informed that the camp was going to make a special release of 18 POWs in honor of Secretary of State Henry Kissinger, who was at Gia Lam Airport in Hanoi. Based on the Rules Of Engagement set in place by the POW Wing to go out together and without official orders from an American official, Gaddis ordered the men not to leave prison. At noon an Air Force Lieutenant Colonel came into the camp to talk to Gaddis. He confirmed that Secretary Kissinger was waiting for the men to arrive. Gaddis then released the 18 and instructed them to put on their clothes and march out. One of the men, who did not want to be stigmatized as a collaborator by being released early, ran back into the area and asked if he could wait for Gaddis at Clark Air Field in the Philippines. He was told "NO. Now get your ___ on that airplane!" Because of the incident, the next group was delayed six days for what the Vietnamese called noncompliance.

On 4 March 1973 Gaddis's group was allowed to leave the camp. Because Gaddis had caused trouble, he was punished by being placed on the last bus for the trip to the airport. At the airport he resumed his proper military sequence. Upon arrival at Clark Air Base, Gaddis was asked to make a public statement to more than 1,000 greeters. He thanked the President of the United States and everyone responsible for the group's freedom. He also mentioned there were still many prisoners in North Vietnam and that nothing should be said or done to delay their release.

At Clark the group feasted on steak and eggs and started their processing to return to a "normal" lifestyle. Later in the evening of that first day of freedom, Gaddis asked the group to meet in the base chapel for a thanksgiving service. The next stop was Hickam Air Force Base in Hawaii. On the tarmac to meet the group was General Frederick C. Blesse the flight leader on the 12 May 1967 mission. When the plane landed at Andrews Air Force Base in Washington, DC, General Daniel (Chappie) James was there to meet them.

The Department of Defense "Operation Homecoming" plan included receiving a handwritten letter from family telling about the significant events that had happened during their internment, a phone call with the family, a physical and dental checkup and a fitting for a new uniform. After being flown home and reuniting with family, they would receive medical treatment and undergo extensive intelligence debriefings.

The following is taken from Gaddis's release statement: "As things improved we began to see the "light at the end of the tunnel," albeit very dim. Our faith and confidence in our leaders was enhanced. Someday in the not too distant future we knew that America would secure our release with honor. Our job was simple - do always what was best for our country. We should never allow our desires to transcend the interests of our country."

I feel that we were fortunate to have a man such as Colonel John P. Flynn as our [POW] leader. His perceptions and persistency caused us to constantly re-evaluate our goals and our policies. And it is my belief that our [professional military] image at the time of the release could be attributed to John Peter Flynn.

To all of you who have made our return possible, to all who helped our families, to all who prayed for our safe return, to all who waited faithfully and patiently, to all who shared our woes, to all who supported our nation, to all whose loved ones have not returned - I trust that the Divine Providence will bless you and give you strength. God Bless you!"

== Hazel's role during POW years ==
In an 18 November 2007 article written by Bonnie Rochman for the Raleigh News and Observer, son, Tony, is quoted: "Where others wanted to vent, she craved action. She didn't indulge in victimhood. It wasn't in her practical nature. Instead, she helped heal her own wounds by helping others whose family members had been captured or killed. She was devastated, but she moved quickly to acceptance, I don't remember having discussions with her about did we think he was alive or dead. She just accepted the state of not knowing."

During Gaddis's internment Hazel served as the NC coordinator for the National League of Families. Her activities involved contacting and engaging with the 80 or more families of North Carolina servicemen who were missing in action or prisoners of war. If alerted that a family was going through the same anguish as hers, she called them the day after the family heard the news to provide support. She also participated in the national meetings of the group.

Gaddis became a public speaker about POW-MIA issues. As a coordinator, she worked directly with the Department of Defense and the State Department. One of the most notable and controversial missions that Hazel was involved with was a letter writing campaign to the North Vietnamese negotiators to the Paris Peace Talks. The family members were especially focused on the inhumane treatment of the prisoners.

Another experiment by the National League of Families was the "No Greater Love" project. Metal bracelets with the POW/MIA's name and serial number were sold for a dollar with a goal of creating awareness of the plight of the military members and to keep hope alive that the service member would return home. When Gaddis returned home he had received over 500 letters from bracelet wearers. There are indications that over 1000 bracelets had his name engraved on them.

== Post POW Military Career ==
After 90 days of convalescence and completing a requalification course for POWs in San Antonio, Texas, Gaddis assumed duties as the vice commander of the 82nd Flying Training Wing at Williams Air Force Base, Arizona, in August 1973. Gaddis became the wing commander in February, 1974. On 1 June 1974 he was promoted to brigadier general with an effective date of 26 May 1974.

In July 1974 Gaddis assumed the duties of director for operational forces, Directorate of Operations, Headquarters U.S. Air Force, with duty at the Pentagon. In February, 1975 he was reassigned as deputy director of operations.

Gaddis retired on 1 June 1976, with General David C. Jones, Chief of Staff, United States Air Force officiating. He had served 30 years, was a command pilot with over 4300 flying hours, and endured 2,124 days as a POW.

== After Military Life ==
After Gaddis's retirement, the family moved back to Winston-Salem, North Carolina, where Hazel and younger son, Tony, had lived during the imprisonment. They had a home built on the thirteenth green in Bermuda Run, a gated golf community. The home had been designed and constructed in Gaddis's mind while in solitary confinement. The Gaddises assumed active roles in their community including leadership roles at Ardmore Baptist Church, Bermuda Run Country Club and the Kiwanis. Gaddis worked in the Wake Forest University department in a career development and job placement role. In 1996 the Gaddises moved to Durham, North Carolina, to be closer to his older son, Steve, and his family as well as the VA Hospital. They traveled extensively throughout Europe in 1996. In 1998 Gaddis was invited by the German community near the US Air Force Base in Neubiberg, Germany, to be the guest speaker for the rededication of the air base's chapel. Travel in Europe has included several trips to Normandy to visit the grave of his brother, Ralph, who was killed on June 12, 1944, during the D-Day invasion of France at Omaha Beach.

Following Hazel's death in 2007, Gaddis eventually moved in with his younger son and spent time between Raleigh and the family farm. The farm, in Vance County, is 90 acres and includes a home, barns, hay fields, pine forest as well as solar power for the house and well. Well into his 90s, he still enjoyed logging "jet flight hours" on his zero turn Toro mower at the farm and loved to salute the F-15s from Seymour Johnson that regularly fly low altitude missions, passing directly over the farm.

Gaddis continued his speaking engagements after retiring in 1976. Besides military venues like Veterans of Foreign Wars (VFW) and Military Officers Association of America (MOAA) he has shared his story with a wider audience including church groups, local DAR (Daughters of the American Revolution) chapters and was the featured speaker for the 100th anniversary of Knoxville High School. In February, 2015, he shared the stage at the North Carolina Museum of History with two other men from the Triangle area who spent years in North Vietnamese prisons or re-education camps.

In November 2011, General Gaddis was inducted into the Tennessee Aviation Hall of Fame.

In 2013 Gaddis and his sons gave an endowment to Meredith College for the creation of the Hazel Lee Gaddis Engineering Scholarship. The scholarship supports students who are pursuing their studies through Meredith's Engineering Dual Degree Program, a partnership between Meredith College and NC State University. At completion, students in this program earn a Bachelor of Arts degree from Meredith College in chemistry or mathematics and a Bachelor of Science degree from NCSU in chemical or environmental engineering, or civil, computer, electrical, industrial or mechanical engineering. Meredith College President Jo Allen made this statement: "Hazel Gaddis had the spirit and can-do attitude of a Meredith woman. She saw a problem to be solved and became a powerful advocate."

== Personal life and death ==
The Gaddises had two sons: Steve was born on 4 March 1946 and Tony on 15 June 1956. Hazel Ketner Gaddis died on 14 October 2007 from complications related to myelofibrosis.

Norman C. Gaddis died on February 13, 2024, at the age of 100.

== Awards and decorations ==
General Gaddis received the following awards and decorations:

| Command Pilot |

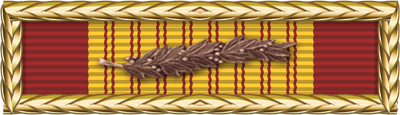
| Air Force Distinguished Service Medal |
| Silver Star with Bronze Oak Leaf Cluster |
| Legion of Merit |
| Distinguished Flying Cross |
| Bronze Star Medal with Valor Device with Bronze Oak Leaf Cluster |
| Purple Heart with Oak Leaf Cluster |
| Air Medal with five Bronze Oak Leaf Clusters |
| Air Force Commendation Medal |
| Army Commendation Medal |
| Air Force Outstanding Unit Award |
| Prisoner of War Medal |
| Combat Readiness Medal |
| Army Good Conduct Medal |
| American Campaign Medal |
| World War II Victory Medal |
| Army of Occupation Medal |
| National Defense Service Medal |
| Vietnam Service Medal |
| Vietnam Service Medal |
| Air Force Longevity Service Award |
| Vietnam Gallantry Cross Unit Award with Palm |
| Vietnam Campaign Medal |

For his extraordinary and enduring accomplishments in aviation for Tennessee and our nation, and for his service to our country, Brig. Gen. Norman C. Gaddis, USAF (Ret.) was honored by and inducted into the Tennessee Aviation Hall of Fame on November 12, 2011.

On June 4, 2022, he was inducted as a member of the inaugural class of the North Carolina Military Hall of Firsts.

Brig. Gen. Norman C. Gaddis, USAF (Ret.) received the North Carolina Order of the Long Leaf Pine on September 30, 2023.

On the occasion of his hundredth birthday, he was honored by letters of congratulations from President Joe Biden, Senator Tom Tillis, Senator Ted Budd, and Representative Deborah Ross. He also received a flag flown over the national Capital in his honor.

== Notes ==
Footnotes

Citations

1. BRIGADIER GENERAL NORMAN C. GADDIS Veteran Tributes. Retrieved 15 February 2017
2. Christmas 1972 B-52 bombing – https://www.bbc.com/news/magazine-20719382
3. Gaddis' release statement - http://www.pownetwork.org/bios/g/g044.htm News & Observer (November 18, 2007 Raleigh N&O Bonnie Rochman, Staff Writer)
