= Anthony J. Rock =

United States Air Force general

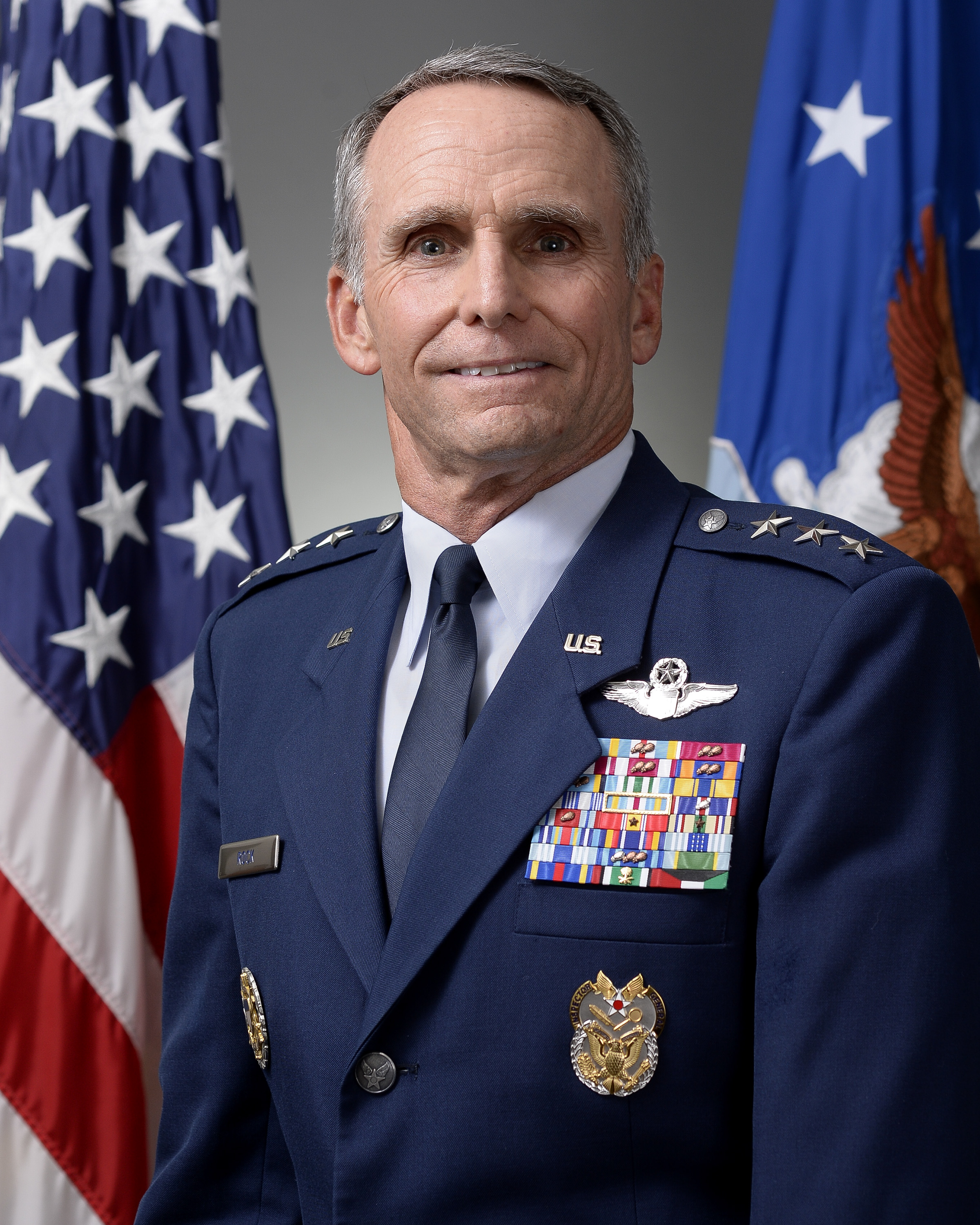
- Born: 1959 (age 66–67)
- Military career
- Allegiance: United States of America
- Branch: United States Air Force
- Service years: 1982–2017
- Rank: Lieutenant General
- Commands: Inspector General of the Air Force; Office of the Defense Representative, U.S. Embassy, Pakistan; 366th Fighter Wing
- Conflicts: Gulf War; Operation Enduring Freedom; Iraq War
- Awards: Defense Distinguished Service Medal; Defense Superior Service Medal (3); Legion of Merit (3)

Anthony James Rock (born 1959) is a retired lieutenant general of the U.S. Air Force and last served as the Inspector General of the Air Force assigned within the Office of the Secretary of the Air Force, Washington, D.C.

General Rock graduated from the University of Texas at San Antonio and earned his Air Force commission through Officer Training School. Rock later served as an F-15C instructor pilot and flight examiner in multiple assignments. He has commanded a fighter squadron, a center, and fighter and air expeditionary wings in Idaho and Iraq. He has held staff assignments at the Joint Warfighting Center, Air Combat Command, U.S. Northern Command, U.S. Forces Iraq, the Air Staff, and the Joint Staff. Prior to being the USAF Inspector General (IG), General Rock was Chief, Office of the Defense Representative, Pakistan.

As the U.S. Air Force IG, he reported to the Secretary of the Air Force and Chief of Staff of the Air Force on matters concerning Air Force effectiveness, efficiency, and the military discipline of active duty, Air Force Reserve and Air National Guard forces.

== Flight information ==
Rating: Command pilot
Flight hours: More than 4,000
Aircraft flown: T-37, T-38, T-41, T-6, F-15C, F-15E

== Education ==
- 1982 Bachelor's degree in history, University of Texas at San Antonio, San Antonio, Texas
- 1995 Master of Science degree in aviation science, Embry-Riddle Aeronautical University
- 1996 Air Command and Staff College, Maxwell AFB, Ala.
- 2002 Master's degree in strategic studies, Air War College, Maxwell AFB, Ala.
- 2008 Joint Force Air Component Commander Course, Maxwell AFB, Ala
- 2010 Senior Executives in National and International Security Course, Harvard University
- 2013 Joint Flag Officer's Warfighting Course, Maxwell AFB, Ala

== Assignments ==
1. January 1983 - December 1983, student, undergraduate pilot training, Laughlin AFB, Texas
2. January 1984 - December 1988, instructor pilot and flight examiner, 47th Flying Training Wing, Laughlin AFB, Texas
3. January 1989 - June 1993, instructor pilot, flight examiner and flight commander, 1st Fighter Wing, Langley AFB, Va.
4. June 1993 - July 1995, assistant operations officer, flight examiner and instructor pilot, 325th Fighter Wing, Tyndall AFB, Fla.
5. July 1995 - June 1996, student, Air Command and Staff College, Maxwell AFB, Ala.
6. June 1996 - October 1998, plans and operations officer (J7), Joint Warfighting Center, Fort Monroe, Va.
7. March 1999 - August 1999, operations officer, 95th Fighter Squadron, Tyndall AFB, Fla.
8. August 1999 - June 2001, Commander, 95th Fighter Squadron, Tyndall AFB, Fla.
9. July 2001 - June 2002, student, Air War College, Maxwell AFB, Ala.
10. July 2002 - July 2004, Commander, Warrior Preparation Center, Ramstein Air Base, Germany
11. July 2004 - June 2005, Vice Commander, 33rd Fighter Wing, Eglin AFB, Fla.
12. June 2005 - June 2006, Deputy Director of Requirements, Headquarters Air Combat Command, Langley AFB, Va.
13. June 2006 - September 2007, Commander, 366th Fighter Wing, Mountain Home AFB, Idaho
14. October 2007 - July 2009, Deputy Director of Operations, Headquarters U.S. Northern Command, Peterson AFB, Colo.
15. July 2009 - December 2010, Commandant, Air Command and Staff College, and Vice Commander, Spaatz Center for Officer Education, Air University, Maxwell AFB, Ala.
16. January 2011 - December 2011, Director, Iraqi Training and Advisory Mission - Air Force, U.S. Forces - Iraq, U.S. Central Command; and Commander, 321st Air Expeditionary Wing, Baghdad, Iraq
17. January 2012 – March 2012, Special Assistant to the Air Force A3/5 Deputy Chief of Staff, Operations, Plans and Requirements
18. April 2012 – June 2014, Vice Director for Strategic Plans and Policy, Joint Staff, the Pentagon, Washington, D.C.
19. July 2014 – March 2016, Chief, Office of the Defense Representative, Pakistan, U.S. Embassy, Pakistan
20. May 2016 - November 2017, Inspector General of the Air Force, Office of the Secretary of the Air Force, Washington, D.C.

== Controversy ==
General Rock was involved in the Leland B.H. Bohannon controversy. In October 2017 this controversy garnered national attention after bronze star recipient Col Bohannon was stripped of command by General Rock after Col Bohannon did not send a certificate of appreciation to the same-sex spouse of a subordinate upon that subordinates retirement. In November 2017 six United States senators sent a letter to the Air Force secretary in support of Bohannon and 94 United States Senators did not.

== Awards and decorations ==
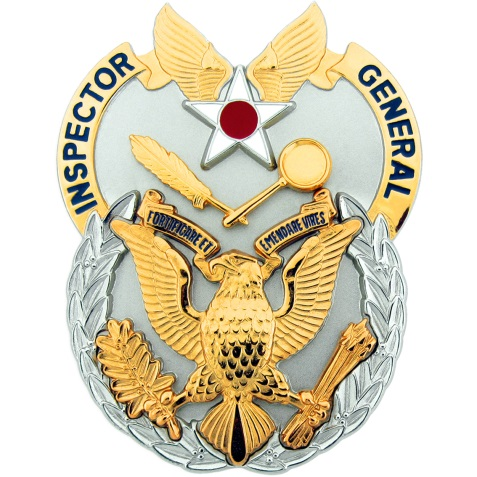
Command Pilot Badge
Air Force Inspector General Badge
Joint Chiefs of Staff Identification Badge

Defense Distinguished Service Medal
Defense Superior Service Medal with two bronze oak leaf clusters
Legion of Merit with two oak leaf clusters
Defense Meritorious Service Medal
Meritorious Service Medal with three oak leaf clusters
Air Medal with two oak leaf clusters
Aerial Achievement Medal with three oak leaf clusters
Joint Service Commendation Medal
Air Force Commendation Medal
Air Force Achievement Medal
Joint Meritorious Unit Award
Air Force Outstanding Unit Award with one silver oak leaf cluster
Combat Readiness Medal with oak leaf cluster
National Defense Service Medal with bronze service star
Southwest Asia Service Medal with one service star
Global War on Terrorism Expeditionary Medal
Global War on Terrorism Service Medal
Air Force Overseas Short Tour Service Ribbon
Air Force Overseas Long Tour Service Ribbon
Air Force Longevity Service Award with silver and two bronze oak leaf clusters
Small Arms Expert Marksmanship Ribbon
Air Force Training Ribbon
Kuwait Liberation Medal (Saudi Arabia)
Kuwait Liberation Medal (Kuwait)

== Effective dates of promotion ==
- Second Lieutenant December 22, 1982
- First Lieutenant December 22, 1984
- Captain December 22, 1986
- Major March 1, 1994
- Lieutenant Colonel January 1, 1998
- Colonel July 1, 2002
- Brigadier General June 20, 2008
- Major General October 3, 2011
- Lieutenant General July 17, 2014

Military offices
Preceded by Gregory A. Biscone	Inspector General of the United States Air Force; May 2016 – November 2017	Succeeded by Stayce D. Harris
