= Glen W. Martin =

United States Air Force general

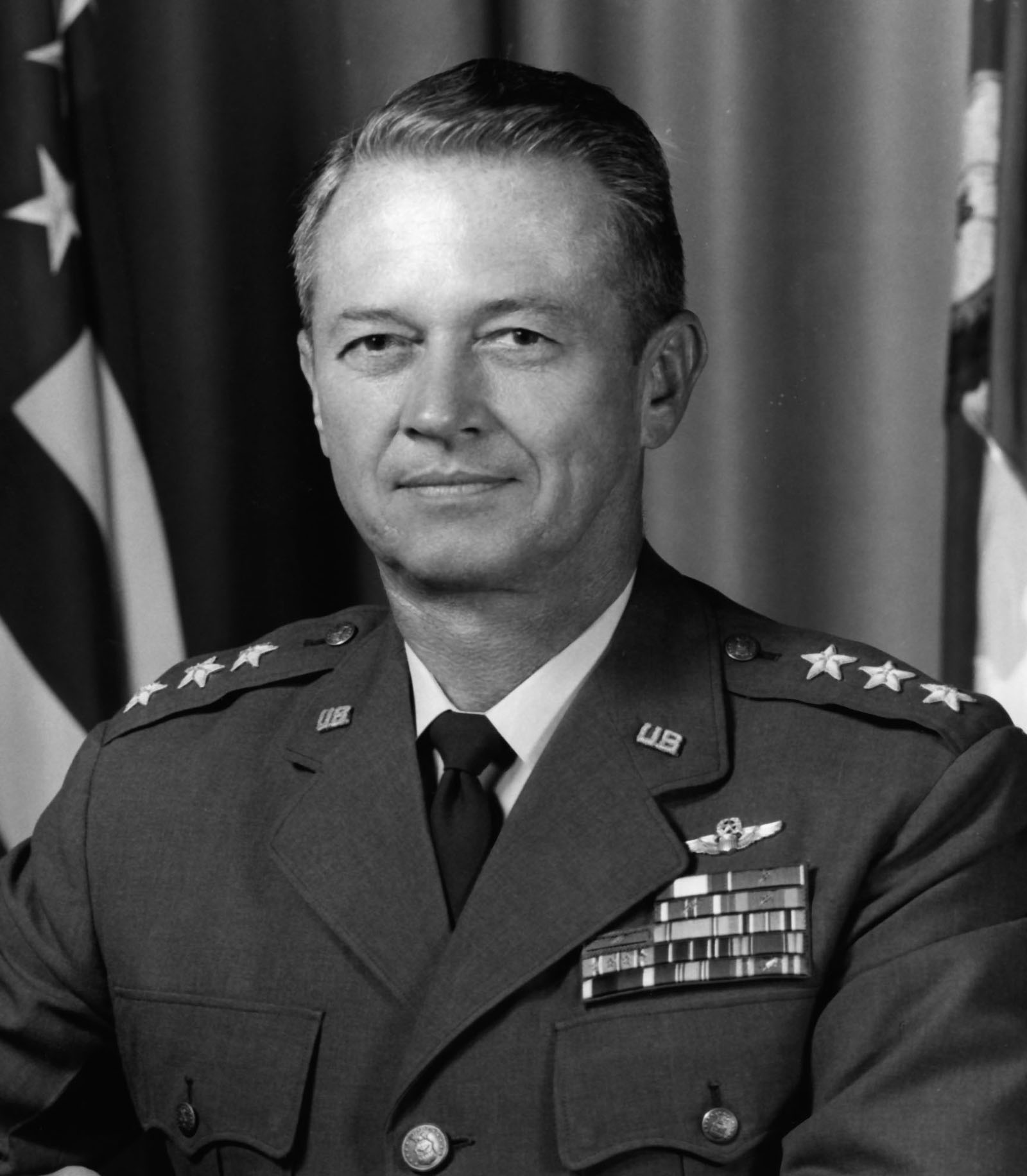
- Born: May 23, 1916; Chicago, Illinois
- Died: June 23, 1994 (aged 78); San Antonio, Texas
- Burial place: United States Air Force Academy Cemetery, Colorado Springs, Colorado
- Military career
- Allegiance: United States of America
- Branch: United States Air Force
- Service years: 1937–1973
- Rank: Lieutenant General
- Commands: Vice Commander-in-Chief, Strategic Air Command
- Conflicts: World War II; Cold War
- Awards: U.S. Army Distinguished Service Medal; Air Force Distinguished Service Medal; Legion of Merit (2); Distinguished Flying Cross (2); Air Medal (2)

Glen Webster Martin (May 23, 1916 – June 23, 1994) was an American Air Force lieutenant general whose last assignment was vice commander in chief, Strategic Air Command, headquartered at Offutt Air Force Base, Nebraska. He assumed this position August 1, 1969 and served until September 30, 1973.

== Biography ==
Martin was born in Chicago, Illinois in 1916. He graduated from Purdue University in 1937 with a Bachelor of Science degree in mechanical engineering. Martin was commissioned as a second lieutenant in the Army Reserves on June 12, 1937. After completing primary and basic flying training at Randolph Field, Texas, he graduated from advanced flying school at Kelly Field, Texas, in 1939 and was assigned there as a flight instructor. This was followed by assignments as operations officer, squadron commander, and group commander at Maxwell Field, Alabama; Turner Field, Georgia; and Hendricks Army Airfield, Florida.

In November 1942 he was assigned to the Office of the Assistant Chief of Staff for Operations, Headquarters Army Air Forces, Washington, D.C. In 1943 he served successively as commander of a provisional B-17 group at Walla Walla, Wash.; in the Eighth Air Force in England; and later as deputy commander of the 488th Bombardment Group at MacDill Field, Florida. In 1944 he was transferred to Tinian, Mariana Islands; became commander of the 504th Bombardment Group; and later was operations officer for the Twentieth Air Force.

In November 1947 he was selected to be the assistant executive and later, executive to the secretary of the Air Force, Washington, D.C.

Martin was transferred to Europe in February 1951 where he held staff positions at Headquarters U.S. Air Forces in Europe, Wiesbaden, Germany; Allied Air Forces Central Europe, Fontainebleau, France; and Supreme Headquarters Allied Powers in Europe, Rocquencourt, France.

Upon his return to the United States in September 1954, he was assigned to Strategic Air Command as deputy commander of the 6th Bombardment Wing. He became commander of the wing and later, commander of the 47th Air Division, both at Walker Air Force Base in New Mexico. In July 1957 he was transferred to Washington, D.C., where he became deputy director of plans at Headquarters U.S. Air Force, and also the Air Force member of the Joint Strategic Plans Committee. In September 1960 he became director of plans. In 1961 he was appointed military assistant to the secretary of the Air Force.

His next duty was at Headquarters Pacific Air Forces where he served as deputy chief of staff for plans and operations from mid-1962 until August 1965 when he was named the Inspector General of the U.S. Air Force. He served in this capacity until February 1967 when he was appointed deputy chief of staff, Plans and Operations, Headquarters U.S. Air Force. In this capacity he was also the Air Force Operations Deputy with the Joint Chiefs of Staff. In August 1969 Martin became vice commander in chief of SAC at Offutt Air Force Base.

His military decorations and awards include the Army and the Air Force Distinguished Service Medals, the Legion of Merit with oak leaf cluster, the Distinguished Flying Cross with oak leaf cluster and the Air Medal with oak leaf cluster. He is a command pilot with more than 8,000 hours of flight time and a master missileman. He has flown most of the aircraft types which have become operational in the U.S. Army Air Forces and Air Force since 1939. He has current qualification in two types of jet aircraft and has piloted all SAC equipment including the SR-71 and the U-2. He retired on October 1, 1973, and died of cancer in San Antonio, Texas on June 23, 1994. Martin was interred at the United States Air Force Academy Cemetery on July 1, 1994.

Military offices
| Preceded by William K. Martin | Inspector General of the United States Air Force; August 1965 – February 1967 | Succeeded by Theodore R. Milton |
