= Inspector General of the Department of the Air Force =

Senior appointment in the United States Air Force

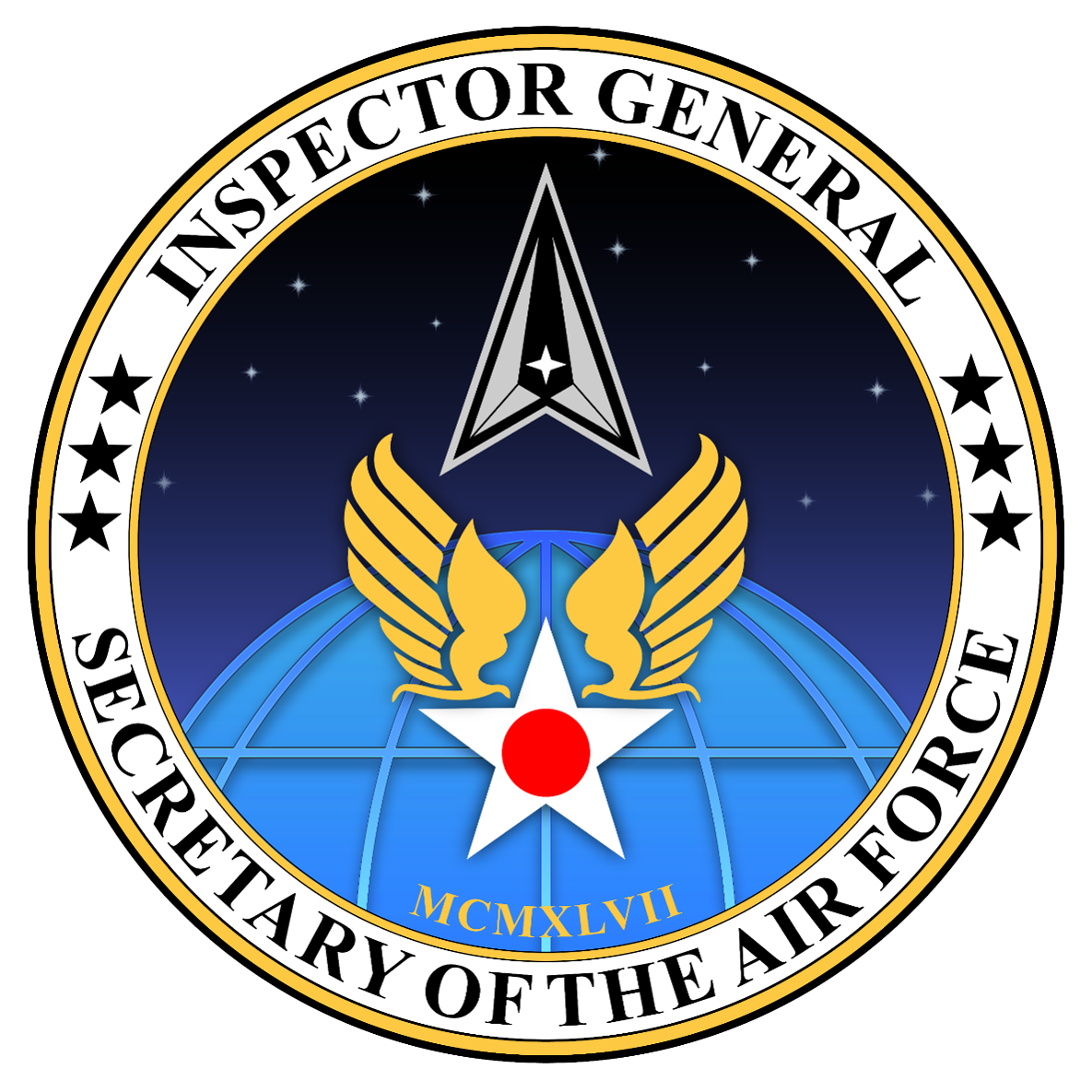
- Seal of the inspector general

- Flag of an Air Force lieutenant general

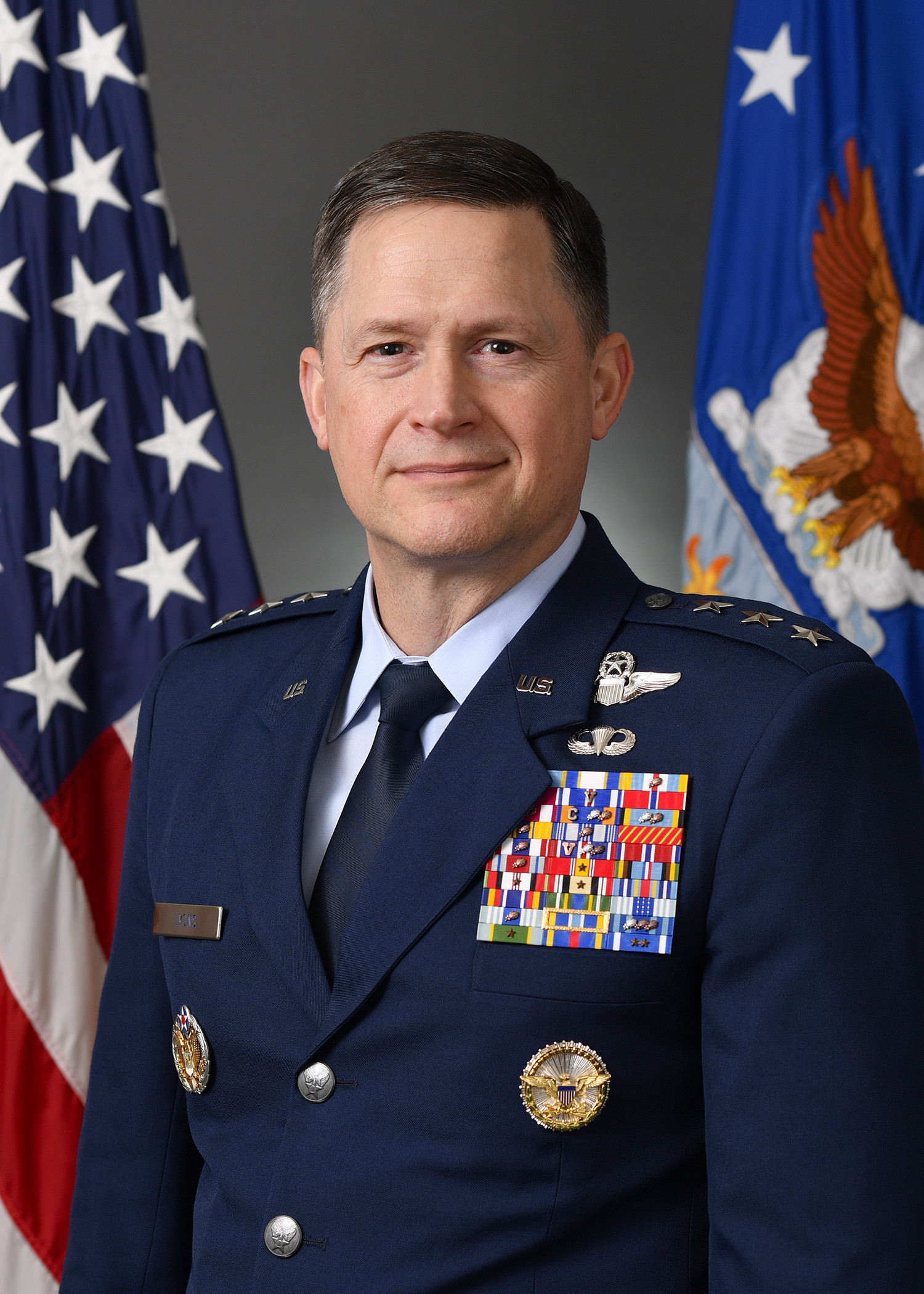
- Incumbent; Lieutenant General David B. Lyons since November 10, 2025
- Department of the Air Force; Air Staff
- Type: Inspector general
- Abbreviation: DAF/IG
- Reports to: Secretary of the Air Force
- Seat: Headquarters Air Force, The Pentagon, Arlington, Virginia
- Appointer: The president with Senate advice and consent
- Term length: 4 years
- Constituting instrument: 10 U.S.C. § 9020
- Formation: 1947
- First holder: Maj Gen Junius Jones
- Website: www.afinspectorgeneral.af.mil

The inspector general of the Department of the Air Force is responsible for conducting investigations and inspections as directed by the secretary of the Air Force, chief of staff of the Air Force, and chief of space operations. The position was originally established after World War II as the air inspector, which was carried over from the United States Army Air Forces. The current mission of the inspector general is prescribed by Title 10 (§ 8020) and Title 32 of the United States Code (§ 105) to develop United States Air Force (USAF) and United States Space Force (USSF) policy to assess readiness, discipline and efficiency with a vision to help shape senior leader decisions affecting the readiness of the USAF and USSF to strengthen the nation's defense.

== History ==
In 1943, Junius Jones was designated the air inspector of the United States Army Air Forces and when the United States Air Force (USAF) became an independent service in 1947, he retained his position.

In 1948, the air inspector was renamed to the inspector general of the Air Force.

In December 1971, Lt Gen Louis L. Wilson Jr. oversees the activation of the Air Force Inspection and Safety Center (which became the Air Force Inspection Agency in 1991) to provide independent assessments of acquisition, safety, nuclear surety, operations, logistics, support, and healthcare to USAF senior leaders. It also evaluates USAF activities, personnel, and policies, and provides legal and compliance oversight of all Air Force-level Field Operating Agencies and Direct Reporting Units.

In September 1986, as a result of the Goldwater–Nichols Act, the inspector general moved directly under the Secretary of the Air Force.

In June 2016, the Air Force IG, and its database contractor Lockheed Martin, came under criticism when 100,000 official records dating back to 2004 were lost due to corrupted data.

In 2021, the inspector general of the Air Force was renamed the inspector general of the Department of the Air Force.

== Organization ==
The Office of Inspector General of the Department of the Air Force consists of four directorates:

- The complaints resolution program investigates complaints and potential cases of fraud, waste, and abuse.
- The inspection system program is designed to evaluate different levels of command in the Air Force to accurately assess the effectiveness of key processes, procedures and requirements based on either public law, executive orders, directives and instructions. The Air Force Inspection Agency heads the inspection program and operates under direction of the Air Force inspector general.
- A senior officials inquiry program to conduct inquiries and investigations of complaints and allegations made against senior Air Force officials (particularly generals and senior executive service members).
- A special investigations directorate which provides policy, planning, program evaluation, and resources for the Air Force's security and investigative activities along with foreign counterintelligence programs. The Air Force Office of Special Investigations is a field operating agency that provides independent criminal investigative, counterintelligence and protective service operations and identifies, investigates, and neutralizes serious criminal, terrorist, and espionage threats to personnel and resources of the Air Force and Space Force.

== List of inspectors general of the Department of the Air Force ==
Image	Rank	Name	Begin date	End date	Notes
	Major General	Junius Wallace Jones	July 1943	1947	(as Air Inspector)
	Major General	St. Clair Streett	1948	1948	(as Air Inspector)
	Brig Gen	Adlai H. Gilkeson	1948	1948	(as Air Inspector)
Hugh J. Knerr	Maj Gen	Hugh J. Knerr	1948	1949	
	Lt Gen	Howard A. Craig	1949	1952	
	Lt Gen	Bryant L. Boatner	1952	1954	
Truman H. Landon	Lt Gen	Truman H. Landon	1954	1956	
Elmer J. Rogers, Jr.	Lt Gen	Elmer J. Rogers, Jr.	1956	1959	
Joseph Carroll (general)	Lt Gen	Joseph Carroll	1960	1961	
William H. Blanchard	Lt Gen	William H. Blanchard	1961	1963	
John Dale Ryan	Lt Gen	John D. Ryan	August 1963	1964	
Keith K. Compton	Lt Gen	Keith K. Compton	August 1964	1965	
	Lt Gen	William K. Martin	February 1965	August 1965	
Glen W. Martin	Lt Gen	Glen W. Martin	August 1965	February 1967	
Theodore R. Milton	Lt Gen	Theodore R. Milton	February 1967	August 1967	
Joseph H. Moore	Lt Gen	Joseph H. Moore	August 1967	1969	
	Lt Gen	Selmon W. Wells	March 1969	1971	
	Lt Gen	Louis L. Wilson Jr.	1971	1973	
	Lt Gen	Gerald W. Johnson	1973	1974	
	Lt Gen	Donald G. Nunn	September 1974	1976	
	Lt Gen	John P. Flynn	September 1976	1978	
	Lt Gen	Howard M. Lane	October 1978	1980	
	Lt Gen	Howard W. Leaf	1980	1983	
	Lt Gen	Robert W. Bazley	1983	1984	
	Lt Gen	Monroe W. Hatch Jr.	September 1984	1985	
	Lt Gen	Robert D. Springer	August 1985	1987	
	Lt Gen	Buford D. Lary	July 1987	1989	
	Lt Gen	Bradley C. Hosmer	September 1989	June 1991	
	Lt Gen	Eugene H. Fischer	August 1991	1993	
	Lt Gen	Marcus A. Anderson	December 1993	1996	
	Lt Gen	Richard T. Swope	April 1996	1998	
	Lt Gen	Nicholas B. Kehoe	September 1998	2000	
	Lt Gen	Raymond P. Huot	August 2000	2003	
	Lt Gen	Steven R. Polk	December 2003	2006	
	Lt Gen	Ronald F. Sams	March 2006	2009	
	Lt Gen	Marc E. Rogers	June 2009	2012	
	Lt Gen	Stephen P. Mueller	May 2012	2014	
	Lt Gen	Gregory A. Biscone	August 2014	May 2016	
	Lt Gen	Anthony J. Rock	May 2016	November 2017	
	Lt Gen	Stayce D. Harris	November 2017	January 2019	
	Lt Gen	Sami D. Said	February 2019	March 2022	
	Lt Gen	Stephen L. Davis	March 22, 2022	November 4, 2025	
	Lt Gen	David B. Lyons	November 10, 2025	Present	

== See also ==
- 2003 United States Air Force Academy sexual assault scandal
- Office of the Inspector General, U.S. Department of Defense
- Naval Inspector General
- List of Inspectors General of the U.S. Army
