= Richard T. Swope =

United States Air Force general

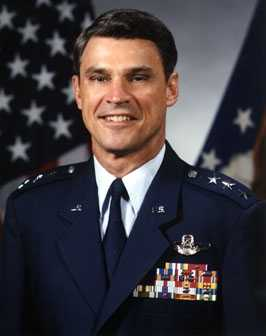
- Lieutenant General Richard T. Swope; Inspector General of the United States Air Force
- Born: November 21, 1942; Binghamton, New York
- Died: January 8, 2011 (aged 68); Whitefish, Montana
- Military career
- Allegiance: United States
- Branch: United States Air Force
- Service years: 1964 - 1998
- Rank: Lieutenant General
- Conflicts: Vietnam War
- Awards: Distinguished Service Medal; Def. Superior Service Medal; Legion of Merit (3)

Richard T. Swope (November 21, 1942 – January 8, 2011) was a lieutenant general in the United States Air Force who served as the Inspector General of the United States Air Force from 1996 until his retirement in 1998.

== Awards and decorations ==
Command Pilot Badge

Air Force Distinguished Service Medal
Defense Superior Service Medal
Legion of Merit (with two bronze oak leaf cluster)
Distinguished Flying Cross
Meritorious Service Medal (with four bronze oak leaf clusters)
Air Medal (fifteen awards total)
Air Medal
Air Force Outstanding Unit Award (with Valor device and two oak leaf clusters)
Combat Readiness Medal
Air Force Recognition Ribbon
National Defense Service Medal (with one bronze service star)
Vietnam Service Medal (with three bronze service stars)
Southwest Asia Service Medal (with service star)
Air Force Overseas Short Tour Service Ribbon
Air Force Overseas Long Tour Service Ribbon with two oak leaf clusters
Air Force Longevity Service Award (with one silver and two bronze oak leaf clusters)
Small Arms Expert Marksmanship Ribbon
Air Force Training Ribbon
Vietnam Gallantry Cross Unit Citation
Vietnam Campaign Medal

== Personal life ==
General Swope was an aviation enthusiast as demonstrated by personally constructing and test flying a Vans Aircraft RV-8 amateur built experimental aircraft of which he was the repairmen.

== Death ==
After retirement, General Swope suffered an unexpected death while skiing at the Whitefish Mountain Resort in Montana on January 8, 2011.

Military offices
Preceded by Marcus A. Anderson	Inspector General of the Air Force; 1996 – 1998	Succeeded by Nicholas Kehoe
