= Junius Wallace Jones =

United States Army general

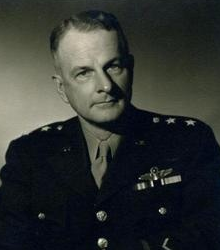
- Born: April 3, 1890; Jackson, Louisiana, US
- Died: February 14, 1977 (aged 86); Jackson, Louisiana, US
- Burial place: St. Francisville, Louisiana
- Military career
- Allegiance: United States
- Branch: United States Army; United States Air Force
- Service years: 1913–1952
- Rank: Major general
- Conflicts: World War II
- Awards: Legion of Merit; Distinguished Service Medal; Air Medal

Junius Wallace Jones, B. S., (April 3, 1890 – February 14, 1977) was a major general in the United States Air Force. He was the Air Inspector (a precursor to Inspector General) for the Air Force when it was formed in 1947.

== Early life ==
Jones was born at Centenaria, the former home of the president of Centenary College, in Jackson, Louisiana, on April 3, 1890, to Philip Huff Jones, M.D. and Annabelle Smith, the second-born of five children. Jones was descended from a prominent local family, his paternal grandfather was John Welch Jones, MD. having been director of the East Louisiana State Hospital (then called the Insane Asylum of Louisiana) and his maternal grandfather having been a plantation owner.

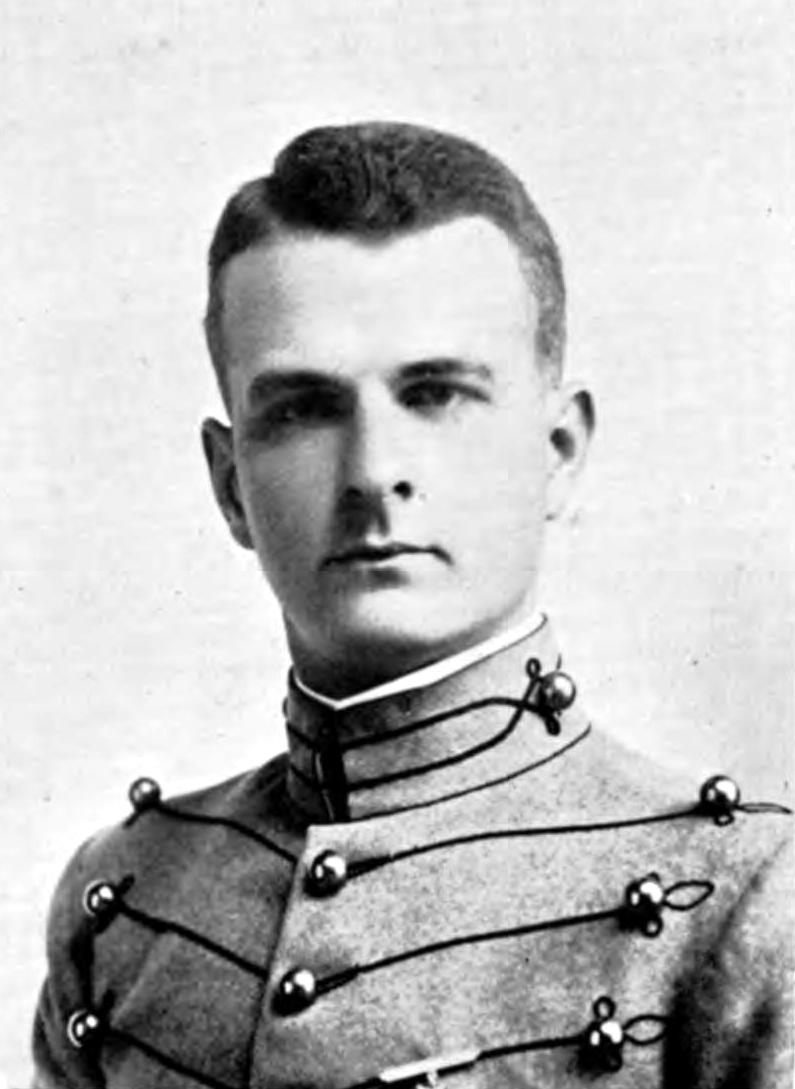
At West Point in 1913

Jones came from a family with a military tradition. Jones descended directly from three soldiers, Samuel Jones, Thomas Jackson, and Samuel Hilton, who served in the Revolutionary War with General Francis Marion, known as "the swamp fox". His grandfather, John Welch Jones, was in the Mexican–American War and served the army of the Confederate States of America as captain of a company of cavalry, the Plains Cavalry, which he organized. Jones received private primary and secondary education. He was attending Louisiana State University in his junior year when he received an appointment to the United States Military Academy at West Point, New York, which he entered on March 1, 1909. Jones graduated in 1913 with a bachelor of science degree.

== United States Army ==
Jones received his commission as a second lieutenant on June 12, 1913, and was assigned to the coast artillery at Fort Monroe, Virginia. Jones was reassigned to Fort Winfield Scott, California, in 1914 where he served with the 64th Company and later with the 27th Company.

Jones was assigned to the United States Military Academy as an instructor in 1916. In June 1919, Jones was ordered to military duty in Koblenz, Germany, with United States Forces. In 1920, Jones was ordered to Paris, France, where he served in motor transport.

== Army Air Service ==
Jones was assigned to the Army Air Service in 1920. He was assigned to Carlstrom Field, DeSoto County, Florida, where he trained as a pilot. Jones graduated from flight school in April 1920, and thereafter was assigned to Post Field, Fort Sill, Oklahoma, where he entered the Air Service Observation School from which he graduated in September 1921. Jones then remained at Fort Sill where he attended the United States Army Field Artillery School. Jones was formally transferred to the Army Air Service in November 1921, having risen to the rank of major.

Jones was then assigned to Mitchell Field, Long Island, New York as air operations officer. In 1924, Jones was moved to the Panama Canal Zone as operations officer at France Field.

== Army Air Corps ==
Jones was appointed Wing Operations Officer at Langley Field, Virginia in February 1927. Jones entered the Air Corps Tactical School at Langley Field in September 1927. Upon graduation, he was sent to the Command and General Staff School at Fort Leavenworth, Kansas, from which he graduated in June 1929. After that, he attended the Army War College at Washington, D.C., from which he graduated in June 1930.

Following his graduation, Jones was appointed to the Inspection Division of the Air Corp as chief of that division. Jones briefly served at March Field, California, as air inspector, but soon entered the Naval War College at Newport, Rhode Island, from which he graduated in June 1934.

Jones was then sent to Chanute Field, Illinois where he served as commandant of the Air Corps Technical School until March 1938 when he was sent to Denver, Colorado, to establish Lowry Field.

Jones was assigned to the Office of the Inspector General at Washington in August 1938. He was given command of the 16th Bombardment Wing at Bowman Field, Kentucky in April 1941.

== Army Air Forces ==
Then Brigadier General Jones was assigned to the Technical Training Command at Greensboro, North Carolina, first as executive officer and later as commanding general, where, among other duties, he had oversight of Embry-Riddle School of Aviation training of enlisted personnel. In June 1943 he returned to Washington as air inspector of the United States Army Air Forces where he remained for the duration of World War II.

== Air Force ==
After the United States Air Force was created from the Army Air Forces in 1947, General Jones remained as Air Inspector until 1948. He was subsequently assigned as commanding general of the Sacramento Air Material Area at McClellan Air Force Base, California, a position in which he remained until his retirement in 1952.

== Honors ==
General Jones was decorated with the Legion of Merit, the Distinguished Service Medal, and the Air Medal.

In 2015 the Air Force established an annual Junius W. Jones Inspector General Award named in his honor to recognize outstanding inspection programs within Air Force units.

== Personal life ==
Jones married Mary Beirne Harmon (b. January 15, 1891) at New York in December 1914, daughter of Edward Valentine Harmon and Marie Antoinette Kinney of Staunton, Virginia. Mary Beirne Harmon Jones died on July 28, 1917, at the age of 26, giving birth to Mary Beirne Jones (Kerr).

Jones married Josephine Lanier, however the marriage did not last.

Jones married Katherine Callahan in 1937. Although the marriage did not last, a daughter, Esther Marilynn Jones (b. 21 May 1940) was born of this marriage.

Jones remodeled Centenaria, the home of his parents at the time of his birth, to serve as his personal residence. After Jones returned to live in Jackson, he married widow Anne Howell Turpin of Jackson on 12 June 1969 at New Orleans.

Jones liked to ride horses. In addition, he was noted for his ability to prepare a Sazerac cocktail.

== Retirement ==
General Jones accepted a position as airport director of Moisant Airport, a position which he occupied for some years. After he left that employment he moved to his family plantation near Jackson, Louisiana where he kept horses and rode frequently. He then remodeled Centenaria, which is a house built in 1840 to serve as the residence of the president of Centenary College of Louisiana, where he resided with his wife, Anne Howell Jones, for the remainder of his life.

== Death ==
Jones died at Centenaria on February 14, 1977, after a stroke. Jones is buried in the cemetery of Grace Episcopal Church, St. Francisville, Louisiana.
