= Marcus A. Anderson =

United States Air Force general

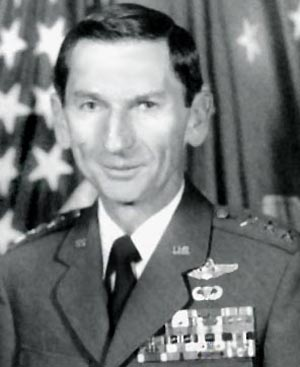
- Born: April 12, 1939 (age 87); Everett, Washington, U.S.
- Military career
- Allegiance: United States of America
- Branch: United States Air Force
- Service years: 1961–1996
- Rank: Lieutenant general
- Commands: Air Force Operational Test and Evaluation Center; Third Air Force; 36th Tactical Fighter Wing; 334th Tactical Fighter Squadron
- Conflicts: Vietnam War
- Awards: Distinguished Service Medal; Legion of Merit (2); Distinguished Flying Cross; Defense Meritorious Service Medal (2); Meritorious Service Medal (3); Air Medal (14)

Marcus Antone Anderson (born April 12, 1939) is a retired lieutenant general in the United States Air Force. He was the Inspector General of the Air Force from 1993 to 1996.

Born in Everett, Washington, and raised in Monroe, Washington, Anderson graduated from the United States Air Force Academy with a B.S. degree in 1961. He later earned an M.S. degree in systems management from the University of Southern California in 1972. He is a 1970 graduate of the Armed Forces Staff College and a 1977 graduate of the National War College.

Anderson has held a variety of operational and staff assignments including commander of a fighter wing in United States Air Forces in Europe (USAFE), Commandant of Cadets of the United States Air Force Academy, commander of a Numbered Air Force in USAFE, and commander of the Air Force Operational Test and Evaluation Center. He is a command pilot with more than 4,400 flying hours, including 240 combat missions in Southeast Asia during the Vietnam War.

His awards include the Distinguished Service Medal, Legion of Merit with oak leaf cluster, Distinguished Flying Cross, Defense Meritorious Service Medal with oak leaf cluster, Meritorious Service Medal with two oak leaf clusters, Air Medal with 13 oak leaf clusters, Air Force Commendation Medal with oak leaf cluster, Vietnam Service Medal with three service stars, and the Republic of Vietnam Gallantry Cross with Palm.

Military offices
Preceded by Eugene H. Fischer	Inspector General of the Air Force; December 1993 – 1996	Succeeded by Richard T. Swope
