= Howard W. Leaf =

United States Air Force general

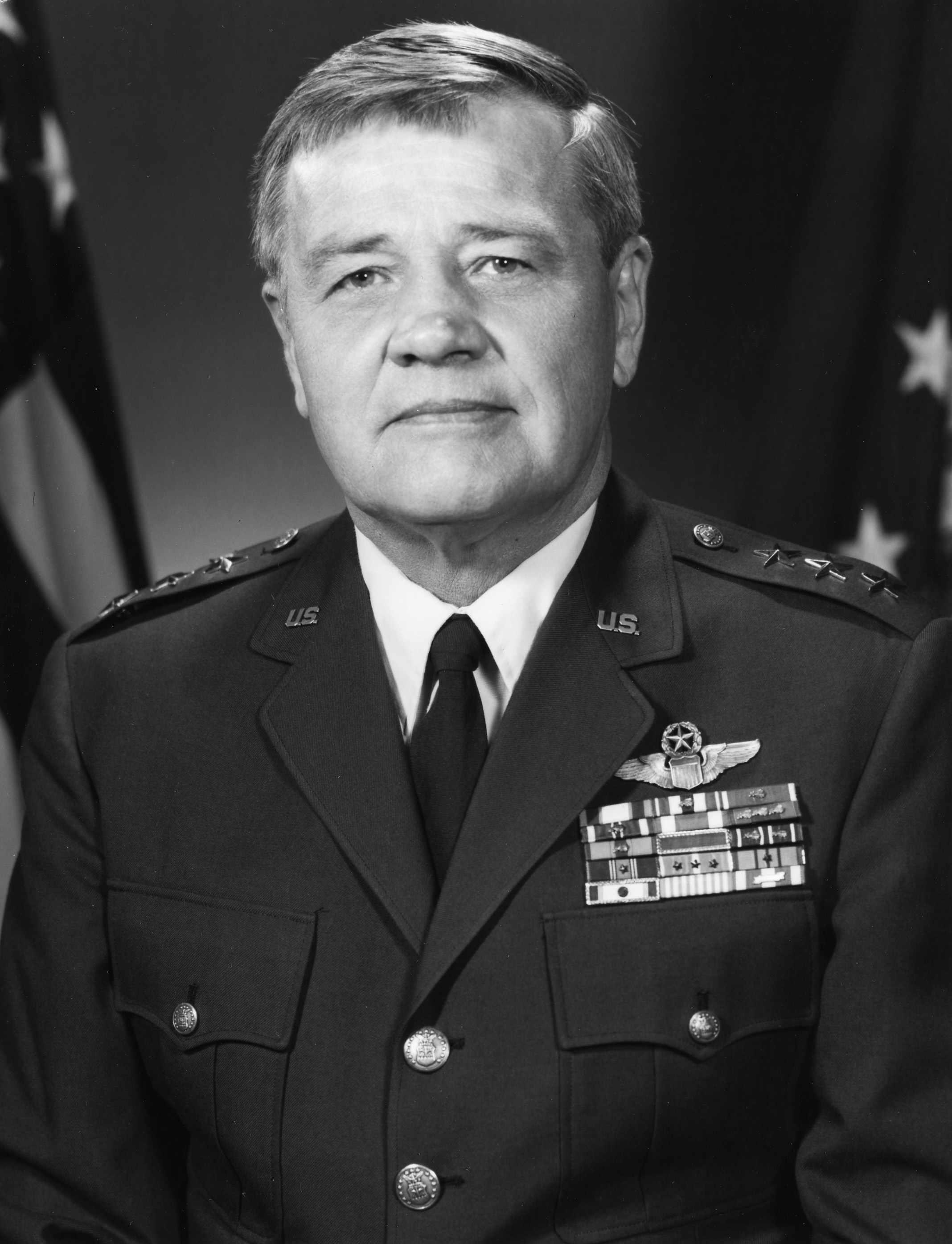
- LtGen Howard Leaf
- Born: September 22, 1923; Menominee, Wisconsin
- Died: April 29, 2009 (aged 85); Aquasco, Maryland
- Burial place: Arlington National Cemetery
- Military career
- Allegiance: United States of America
- Branch: U.S. Army Air Forces; United States Air Force
- Service years: 1943-1946, 1950-1984
- Rank: Lieutenant General
- Commands: 1st Tactical Fighter Wing; 366th Tactical Fighter Wing; Inspector General, USAF
- Conflicts: Korean War; Vietnam War
- Awards: Air Force Distinguished Service Medal (2); Silver Star (2); Legion of Merit (2); Distinguished Flying Cross (2)

Howard Wesley Leaf (September 22, 1923 – April 25, 2009) was a lieutenant general in the United States Air Force. He served as a fighter pilot during the Korean War and Vietnam War and retired as assistant vice chief of staff at the Pentagon in 1984.

== Biography ==
=== Early life ===
Howard W. Leaf was born in Menominee, Wisconsin in 1923. He enlisted in the U.S. Army Air Forces on June 28, 1943, and served as a remote control gun turret repairman until leaving active duty on March 1, 1946. He then attended the Colorado School of Mines and graduated with a Bachelor of Science degree in geophysical engineering in 1950.

=== Air Force career ===
In 1950, Leaf joined the United States Air Force and served as a F-86 Sabre fighter pilot in the Korean War. He later earned a master's degree in geophysics from St. Louis University in 1955. In 1955, he became a test pilot with the Air Proving Ground Command at Eglin Air Force Base, Florida, remaining there until 1960. He graduated from the Air Command and Staff College at Maxwell Air Force Base in 1961 and served as a geophysicist in the Geophysics Division with the Air Force Office of Scientific Research in Washington, D.C., from 1961 to 1965. In 1969, he graduated from the Industrial College of the Armed Forces, Fort Lesley J. McNair, Washington, D.C.

During the Vietnam War, Leaf went to Thailand in March 1966 and served as operations officer and later commander of the 333rd Tactical Fighter Squadron, 355th Tactical Fighter Wing at Takhli Royal Thai Air Force Base. One of his two Silver Star awards was for leading a raid on a North Vietnamese oil refinery.

Leaf later transferred to USAF headquarters in October 1966 where he served in various capacities in the Office of the Deputy Chief of Staff for Research and Development. He entered the Industrial College of the Armed Forces in August 1968 and, in June 1969, returned to the Office of the Deputy Chief of Staff for Research and Development as chief of the Southeast Asia Projects Division.

In March 1971, General Leaf was appointed vice commander and later commander of the 1st Tactical Fighter Wing, MacDill Air Force Base, Florida. From 1971 to 1973, he was the assistant deputy chief of staff for requirements for Tactical Air Command (TAC) at Langley Air Force Base, Virginia. He was then assigned as commander of the 366th Tactical Fighter Wing, Mountain Home Air Force Base, Idaho, and in July 1974 he returned to TAC Headquarters at Langley as the deputy chief of staff for requirements. General Leaf commanded the Air Force Test and Evaluation Center at Kirtland Air Force Base, New Mexico, from October 1976 to May 1980. Lieutenant General Leaf then returned to Washington, D.C., as Inspector General of the Air Force from 1980 to 1983, followed by his final position as assistant vice chief of staff, Headquarters USAF until 1984.

=== Civilian life and death ===
After retirement, he worked for an engineering company, then as a civilian director of the Air Force's Test and Evaluation Directorate at the Pentagon from 1991 to 1997.

He died of "congestive heart failure" at the age of 85. He was survived by his wife of 53 years, Madonna Ronan Leaf, six children and 11 grandchildren.

== Awards and decorations ==
General Leaf was a command pilot with 5,600 flying hours, including 321 combat missions and nearly 600 combat hours. His military decorations and awards include the Air Force Distinguished Service Medal with oak leaf cluster, Silver Star with oak leaf cluster, Legion of Merit with oak leaf cluster, Distinguished Flying Cross with oak leaf cluster, Meritorious Service Medal, Air Medal with 15 oak leaf clusters, Air Force Commendation Medal with oak leaf cluster, Presidential Unit Citation Emblem and Air Force Outstanding Unit Award Ribbon with two oak leaf clusters. General Leaf was the 1978 recipient of the Zuckert Management Award.

- Air Force Distinguished Service Medal with oak leaf cluster
- Silver Star with oak leaf cluster
- Legion of Merit with oak leaf cluster
- Distinguished Flying Cross with oak leaf cluster
- Meritorious Service Medal
- Air Medal with fifteen oak leaf clusters
- Air Force Commendation Medal with oak leaf cluster
- Presidential Unit Citation
- Air Force Outstanding Unit Award with two oak leaf clusters
- National Defense Service Medal with one service star
- Korean Service Medal with three service stars
- Vietnam Service Medal with two service stars
- Republic of Korea Presidential Unit Citation
- United Nations Korea Medal
- Vietnam Campaign Medal

== Legacy ==
The Inspector General of the Air Force awards the Howard W. Leaf Award to outstanding enlisted, officer, and civilian inspectors in the United States Air Force.

The Air Force Association awards their Howard W. Leaf Award for outstanding achievement by a United States Air Force test team engaged in the test and evaluation of a defense acquisition program.

Military offices
Preceded by Howard M. Lane	Inspector General of the United States Air Force; September 1980 – 1983	Succeeded by Robert W. Bazley
