= Robert D. Springer =

American air military officer (1933–2021)

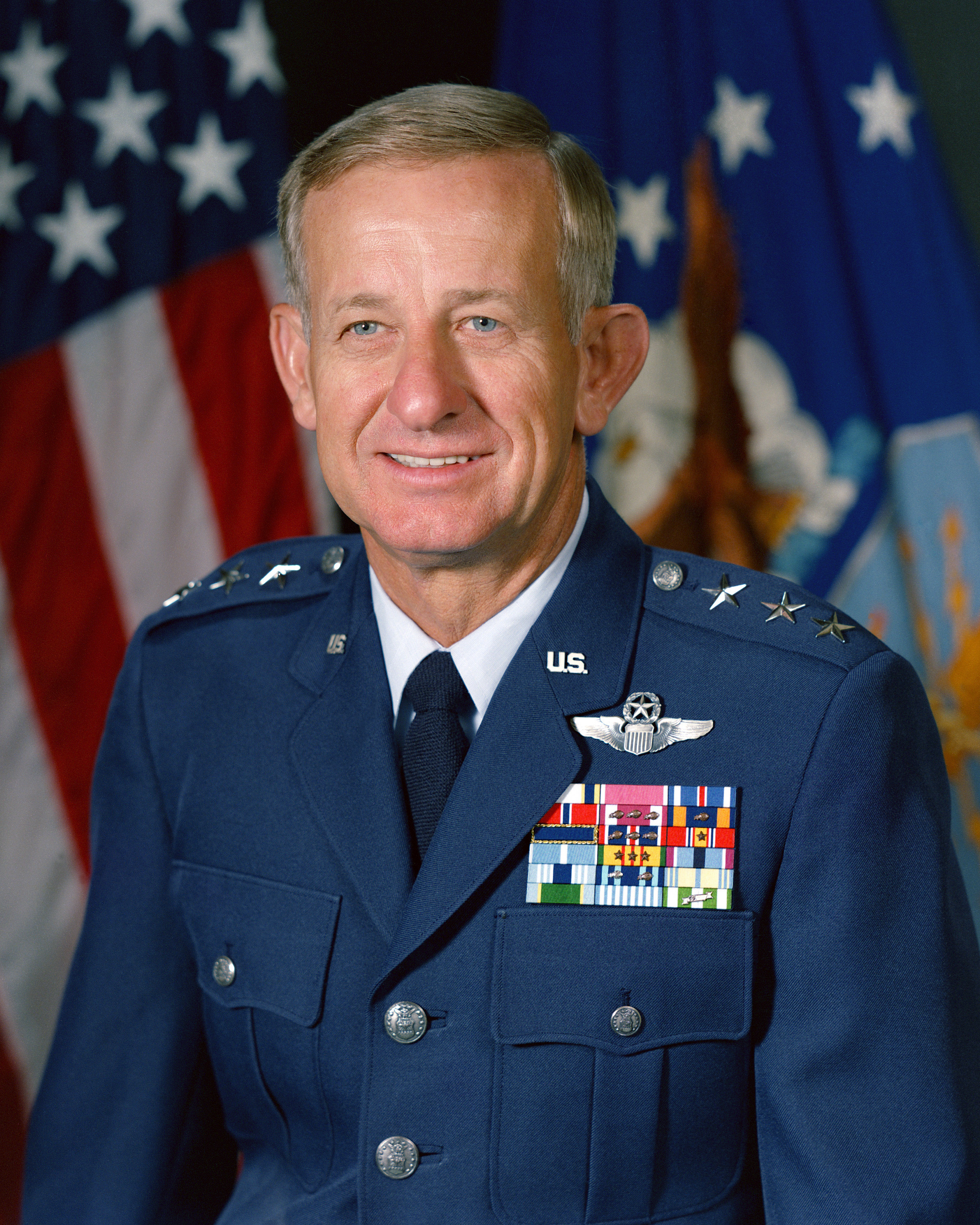
- Born: January 17, 1933; Millheim, Pennsylvania, U.S.
- Died: August 19, 2021 (aged 88); Palmyra, Pennsylvania, U.S.
- Military career
- Allegiance: United States
- Branch: United States Air Force
- Service years: 1952–1988
- Rank: Lieutenant general
- Commands: Inspector General of the Air Force; Vice Commander in Chief, Military Airlift Command

Robert Dale Springer (January 17, 1933 – August 19, 2021) was a lieutenant general in the United States Air Force who served as vice commander in chief, Military Airlift Command from 1987 to 1988 and Inspector General of the Air Force from 1985 to 1987.
