= Robert W. Bazley =

United States Air Force general

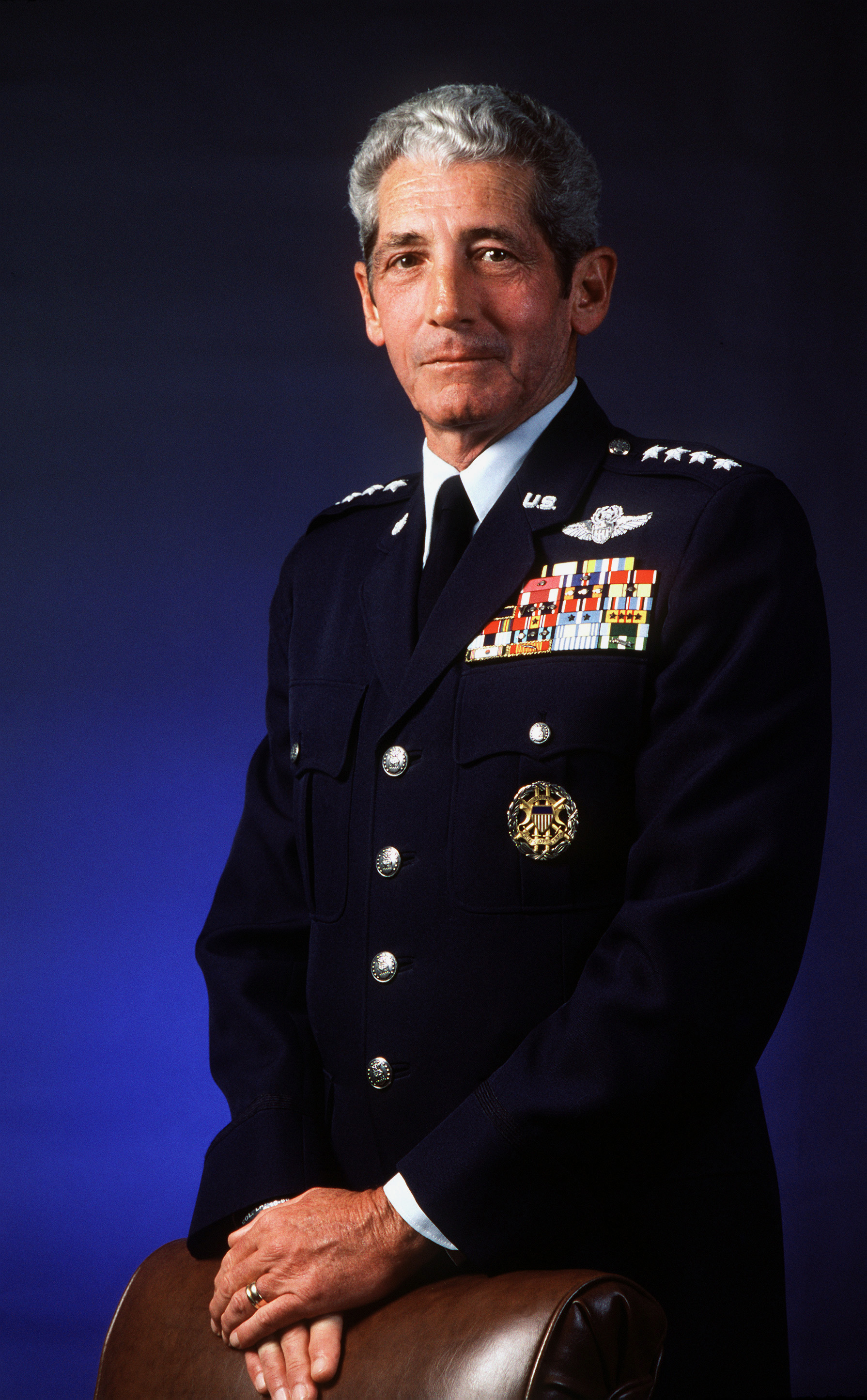
- General Robert W. Bazley
- Born: December 5, 1925; Pittsburgh, Pennsylvania, US
- Died: December 16, 2012 (aged 87); Chapel Hill, North Carolina, US
- Burial place: Arlington National Cemetery
- Military career
- Allegiance: United States
- Branch: United States Air Force
- Service years: 1943–1946; 1951–1987
- Rank: General
- Commands: Pacific Air Forces
- Conflicts: World War II; Korean War; Vietnam War
- Awards: Air Force Distinguished Service Medal; Defense Superior Service Medal; Legion of Merit (2); Distinguished Flying Cross (2); Bronze Star; Air Medal (16)

Robert Whitman Bazley (December 5, 1925 – December 16, 2012) was a United States Air Force (USAF) four-star general who served as Commander in Chief, Pacific Air Forces (CINCPACAF), from 1984 to 1986.

Bazley was born in Pittsburgh, Pennsylvania, in 1925. He graduated from Brentwood High School and received a Bachelor of Science degree in business administration from the University of Pittsburgh in 1949. He is also a 1968 graduate of the Industrial College of the Armed Forces, Fort Lesley J. McNair, Washington, D.C.

Bazley enlisted in September 1943 and entered active duty through the aviation cadet program in January 1944. He received his navigator wings and was commissioned a second lieutenant in the U.S. Army Air Forces in March 1945.

The end of World War II coincided with his completion of B-29 Superfortress combat crew training and Bazley was released from active duty in February 1946. He then entered the University of Pittsburgh.

In November 1951 General Bazley was recalled to the active duty USAF and served as an RB-26 navigator with the 12th Tactical Reconnaissance Squadron at Kimpo Air Base, South Korea. During the Korean War he flew 50 combat sorties.

Bazley entered pilot training in August 1953 and in August 1954 received his wings. Following F-84 Thunderjet fighter weapons training, he transferred to Royal Air Force Station Wethersfield, England, where he served as a pilot, flight commander and assistant operations officer with the 77th Tactical Fighter Squadron.

From May 1958 to June 1960, Bazley was assigned to the 3502nd U.S. Air Force Recruiting Group with duty in Pittsburgh. He then transferred to the United States Air Force Academy.

Upon his return to England in April 1965, he served at RAF Lakenheath as operations officer for the 492nd Tactical Fighter Squadron and later as chief, Operations Division, 48th Tactical Fighter Wing. He returned to the United States in 1967 and completed the Industrial College of the Armed Forces.

In August 1968 he commanded the 531st Tactical Fighter Squadron, 3rd Tactical Fighter Wing, at Bien Hoa Air Base, Republic of Vietnam. He flew 257 combat missions in F-100 Super Sabres. From September 1969 to June 1970, Bazley served in the Directorate of Operations, Headquarters U.S. Air Force, Washington, D.C. He then joined the Directorate of Operations in the Organization of the Joint Chiefs of Staff.

Bazley served as commander of Randolph Air Force Base, Texas, from June 1972 to November 1972. He then moved to Laredo AFB, Texas, and assumed command of the 38th Flying Training Wing.

From October 1973 to August 1975, he commanded the 323rd Flying Training Wing at Mather AFB, California. He was then assigned as inspector general for Headquarters U.S. Air Forces in Europe at Ramstein Air Base, Germany. He became the command's assistant for readiness in June 1976.

He took command of the Air Force Inspection and Safety Center at Norton AFB, California, in May 1978. From July 1979 to June 1980, he commanded Sheppard Technical Training Center, Sheppard AFB, Texas. He then returned to England as commander of 3rd Air Force at RAF Mildenhall. Bazley returned to Ramstein Air Base in July 1981 as vice commander in chief of U.S. Air Forces in Europe. Two years later he assumed duties as Inspector General of the Air Force at USAF Headquarters. He was responsible to the secretary of the Air Force and the chief of staff for U.S. Air Force inspection, safety, security, investigative, counterterrorism, counterintelligence and complaint programs. He assumed command of Pacific Air Forces at Hickam AFB, Hawaii in September 1984, and retired from the USAF on January 1, 1987.

Bazley was a command pilot and navigator with more than 4,500 flying hours. He was inducted into the Order of the Sword by the noncommissioned officers of United States Air Forces in Europe in May 1983 when he served as vice commander of that organization. This award is given for conspicuous and significant contributions to the welfare and prestige of the noncommissioned officers corps. Bazley was Commander of PACAF for the entirety of 1985.

== Awards and decorations ==
Command Pilot Badge
Master Navigator Badge
Office of the Joint Chiefs of Staff Identification Badge

Air Force Distinguished Service Medal
Defense Superior Service Medal
Legion of Merit with one bronze oak leaf cluster
Distinguished Flying Cross with oak leaf cluster
Bronze Star Medal
Meritorious Service Medal
Air Medal with fifteen oak leaf clusters
Air Force Commendation Medal with oak leaf cluster
Air Force Presidential Unit Citation
Air Force Outstanding Unit Award with Valor device and three oak leaf clusters
Air Force Organizational Excellence Award
American Campaign Medal
World War II Victory Medal
National Defense Service Medal with one bronze service star
Korean Service Medal with two service stars
Vietnam Service Medal with four service stars
Air Force Overseas Long Tour Service Ribbon
Air Force Longevity Service Award with silver and two bronze oak leaf clusters
Armed Forces Reserve Medal
Small Arms Expert Marksmanship Ribbon
Republic of Korea Presidential Unit Citation
Vietnam Gallantry Cross Unit Citation
United Nations Korea Medal
Vietnam Campaign Medal

He died at his home in Chapel Hill, North Carolina in December 2012. General Bazley was buried in Arlington National Cemetery.

Military offices
Preceded by Howard W. Leaf	Inspector General of the United States Air Force; 1983 – 1984	Succeeded by Monroe W. Hatch Jr.
