= Theodore R. Milton =

United States Air Force general (1915–2010)

T. R. Milton KBE
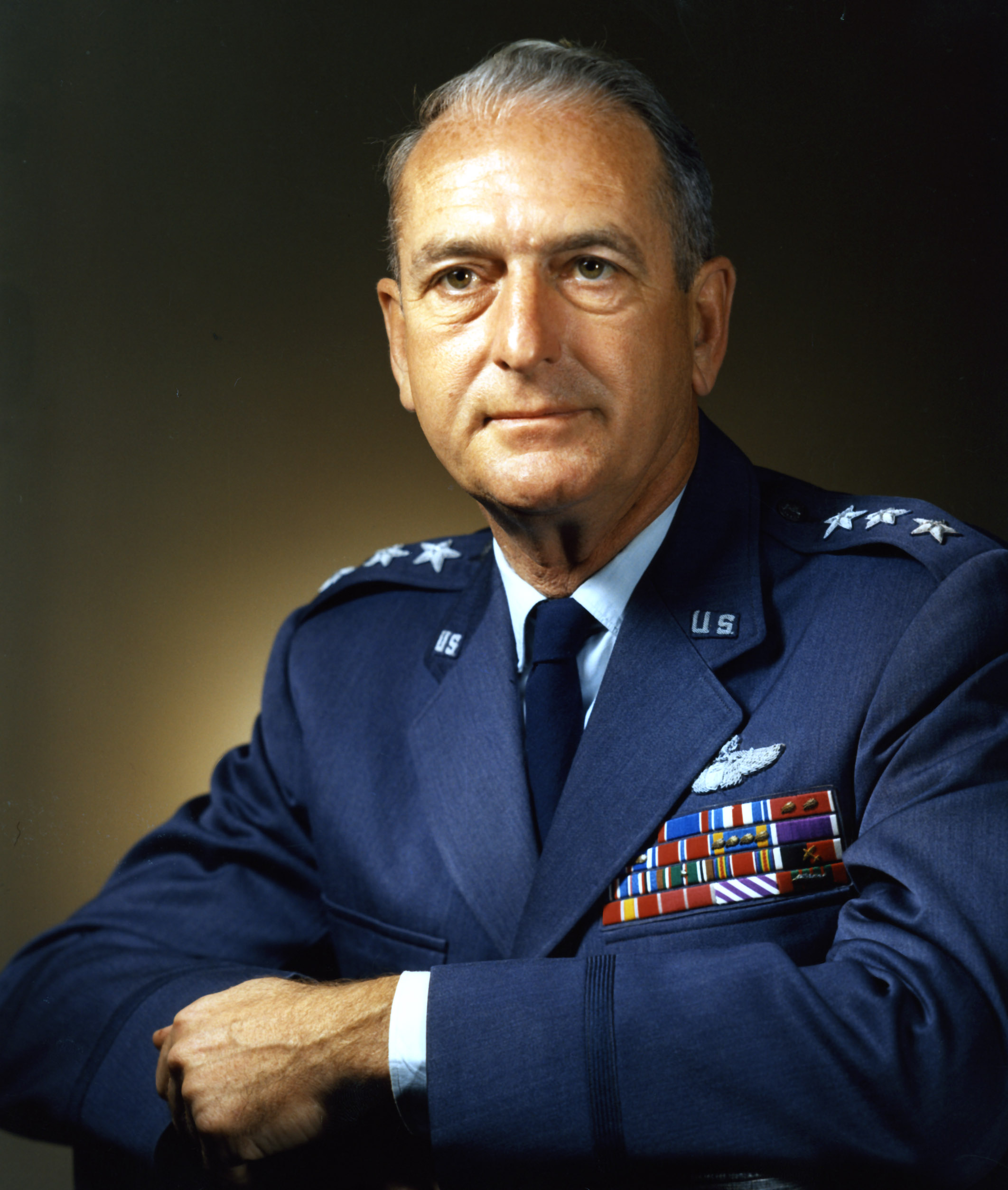
- US Air Force photo of Lt Gen Milton
- Born: Theodore Ross Milton; 29 December 1915; Schofield Barracks; Territory of Hawaii, US
- Died: 24 August 2010 (aged 94)
- Burial place: Arlington National Cemetery
- Education: BS, US Military Academy
- Spouse: Grace Elizabeth Bailey (m. 1942)
- Military career
- Branches: United States Army; United States Air Force
- Years: 1934–1974
- Rank: General
- Commands: 91st Bomb Group; 384th Bomb Group; 41st Air Division; Thirteenth Air Force
- Conflicts: World War II
- Awards: Air Medal × 5; Croix de Guerre; Dist. Flying Cross (UK); Dist. Flying Cross (US) × 4; Dist. Service Cross; Dist. Service Medal × 2; Legion of Merit × 3; Silver Star

Theodore Ross Milton (29 December 1915 – 24 August 2010) was a United States Army and Air Force (USAF) officer and pilot.

== Personal life ==
On 29 December 1915, Theodore Ross Milton was born at Schofield Barracks in the US Territory of Hawaii to United States Army cavalryman, Colonel Alexander Mortimer Milton (United States Military Academy class of 1903). While the Milton family was stationed at Fort Riley, they were friends with future-General of the Air Force Henry H. Arnold; it was a friendly flight with Arnold that put the twelve-year-old Milton on the path to aviation.

While he himself was at the US Military Academy, Milton met his future wife: Grace Elizabeth Bailey (1920–2010); they married in 1942. The Miltons had three children (Patricia Morgan, Theodore Ross Milton Jr., and Barbara Bayley Milton), seven grandchildren, and four great-grandchildren. T. R. Milton died on 24 August 2010, followed by Grace Elizabeth on 20 December; they were both interred at Arlington National Cemetery on 21 January 2011.

== US military ==
Milton enlisted in the United States Army in 1934 as a private. After graduating from the US Military Academy in 1940, he entered United States Army Air Corps pilot training and earned his aviator badge in March 1941.

=== World War II ===
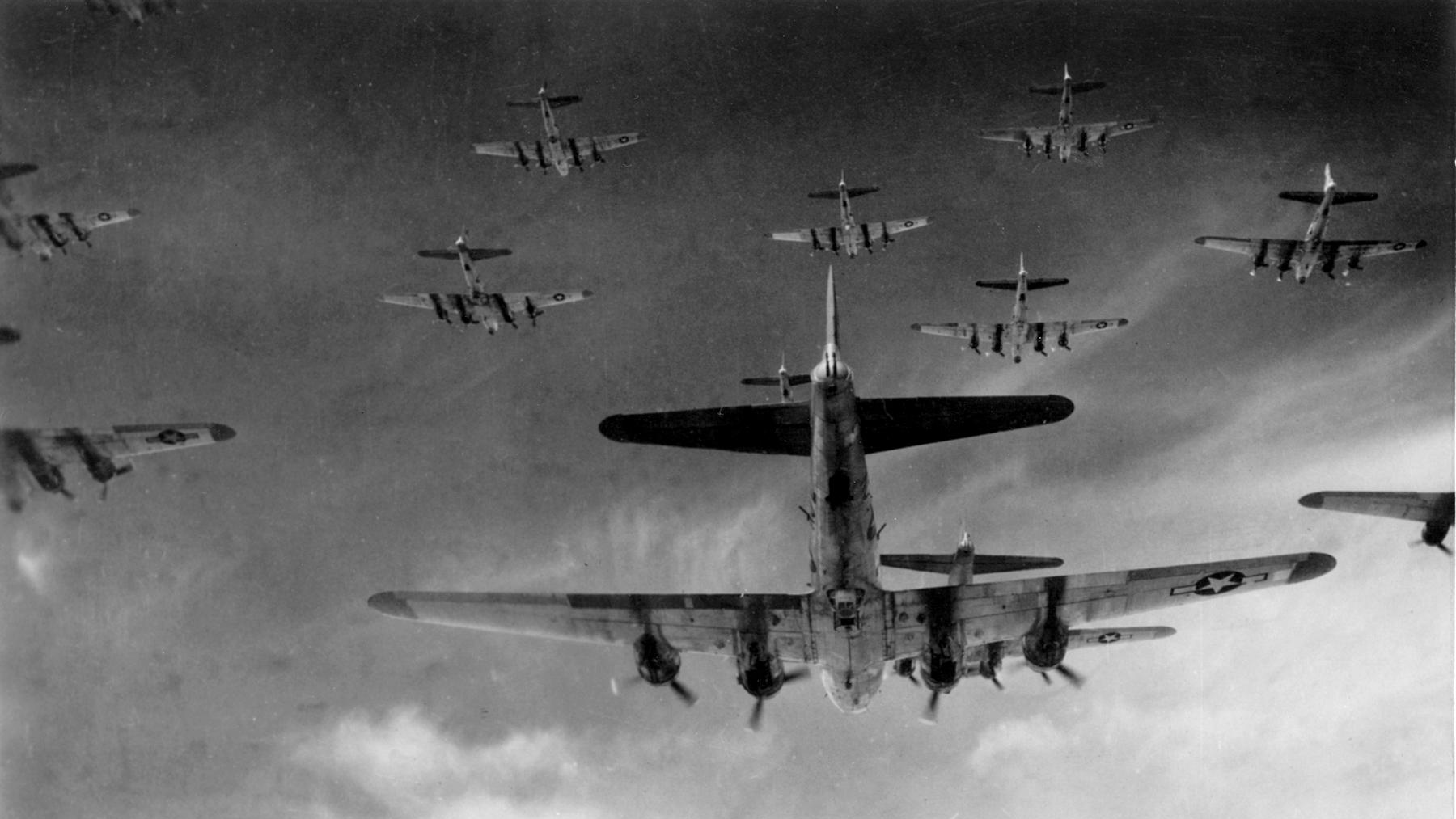
A formation of B-17s from the 398th BG over Europe (13 April 1945)

From 1943 to 1945 during World War II, Milton served in the Eighth Air Force in England aboard Boeing B-17 Flying Fortresses.

The 351st Bomb Group's operations officer, on 12 August 1943, Major Milton found himself and Major Clark Gable aboard Ain't It Gruesome, a B-17F flown by Captain John B. Carraway. Milton was leading 330 B-17Fs and 329 Republic P-47 Thunderbolts out of the United Kingdom to attack the well-defended Nazi synthetic oil production facilities at Gelsenkirchen. The weather forced Milton to divert to bombing Bochum as a target of opportunity; the bombing was successful at the cost of 25 shot-down B-17s. Ain't It Gruesome itself was shot plenty, and Gable lost a boot heel to an unexploded 20-millimetre (0.79 in) shell. For his actions, Milton received a Silver Star.

Five months later, Milton was commander of the 91st Bombardment Group and copilot of a B-17 over Nazi Germany when he was "painfully wounded" by an enemy interceptor. Milton refused aid and remained at his post through the mission's completion, and did not step down until every plane in the large formation had successfully landed at diversion airports. For this action, Milton received a Distinguished Service Cross.

On 24 October 1944, Milton assumed command of the 384th Bomb Group and led bombing runs until 14 April 1945.

=== 1948–1974 ===
Post-WW2 assignments

In 1948, he was the chief of staff for William H. Tunner, commander of the Combined Airlift Task Force, the unit tasked with the Berlin Airlift. From 1949 through 1957, Milton was the Military Air Transport Service director of operations for two years, an Air War College student, and a three-year executive assistant to the Secretary of the Air Force.

In October 1957, Milton was promoted to brigadier general and appointed as the commander of the 41st Air Division in Japan. Four years later, upon his promotion to major general, Milton transferred to Clark Air Base in the Philippines, and took command of the Thirteenth Air Force. After two years as 13 AF/CC, Milton was chosen as deputy chief of staff, plans and operations, to the United States Pacific Command commander-in-chief at Camp H. M. Smith, Hawaii. In August 1965, Milton became the Tactical Air Command chief of staff at Langley Air Force Base.

February 1967 saw Milton's promotion to lieutenant general and his assignment as Inspector General of the Air Force until July 1967. This was followed by his appointment as Comptroller of the Air Force for 20 months. In March 1969, he became the deputy chairman of the NATO Military Committee at NATO headquarters; on 1 August 1971, Milton was promoted to general and made the United States' representative to that same committee. Milton retired on 31 July 1974. After his retirement from the USAF, Milton lectured and wrote for Air Force Magazine.

=== Awards and decorations ===
Among his US awards and decorations, General Milton received a Distinguished Service Cross, two Air Force Distinguished Service Medals, a Silver Star, three Legion of Merits, four Distinguished Flying Crosses, a Bronze Star Medal, five Air Medals, and a Purple Heart. The United Kingdom made Milton an honorary Knight Commander of the Order of the British Empire and awarded him the British Distinguished Flying Cross; France awarded him the Croix de Guerre.
