= Air Force Inspector General Badge =

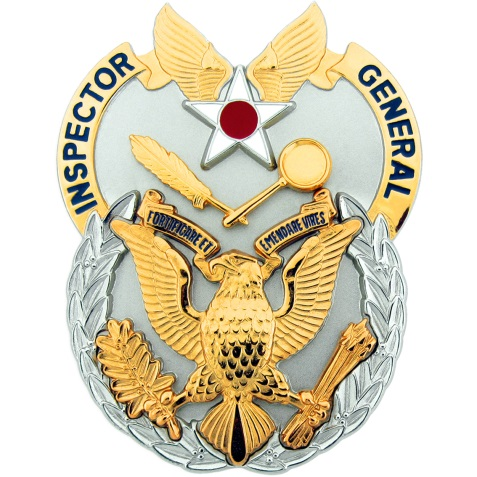
US Air Force Inspector General Duty Badge

The United States Air Force Inspector General Badge is a United States Air Force duty badge authorized for wear by all personnel who are assigned to the United States Air Force Inspector General duty positions. The badge is required to be worn by any personnel performing official duties and assigned to an IG office after completing required training and taking an official oath.

The badge is a symbol to identify Inspectors General who have legal authority to audit, investigate, and inquire into all activities of the forces they inspect under United States Code Title 10 § 8020 and the Inspector General Act of 1978.

== Appearance ==
The badge depicts a gilt American bald eagle, a symbol of the United States and air power. The eagle is holding an olive branch and a bundle of 13 arrows, denoting the power of peace and war—the heart of the Air Force mission. A silver wreath, an ancient symbol of victory, encircles the eagle and meets a banner which reads Fortificare et Emendare Vires meaning "To Strengthen and Improve the Force" in Latin. Above the eagle are heritage "Hap Arnold Wings" of the Army Air Forces era which are centered above a quill and a magnifying glass.

== History ==
The Air Force Inspector General Badge was approved by Air Force Chief of Staff Mark Welsh and adopted for wear in August 2014.

== See also ==
- Air Force Inspection Agency
- Badges of the United States Air Force
