= John P. Flynn =

United States Air Force officer

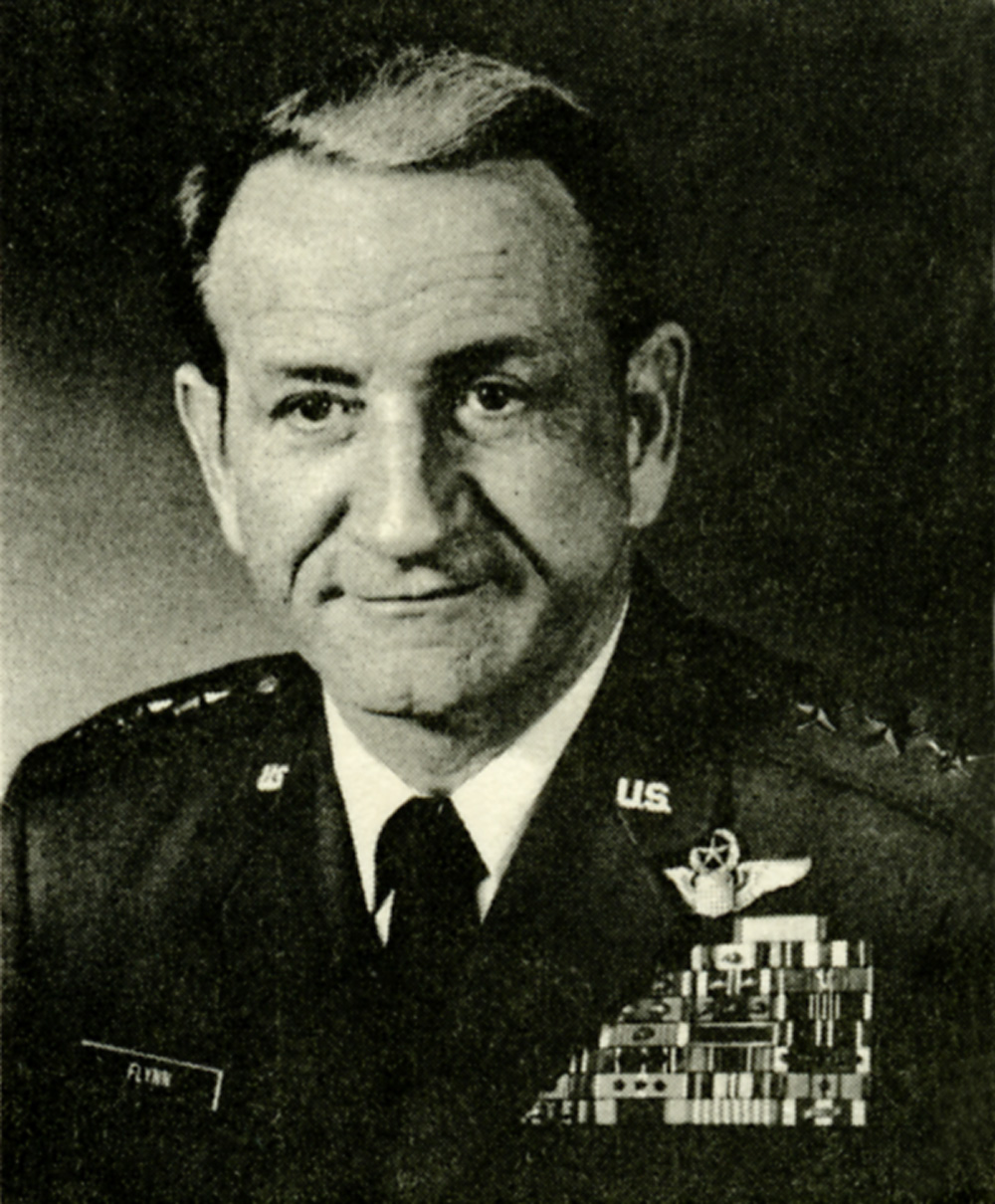
- Lieutenant General John P. Flynn
- Born: 17 July 1922; Cleveland, Ohio
- Died: 5 March 1997 (aged 74); San Antonio, Texas
- Burial place: Fort Sam Houston National Cemetery
- Military career
- Allegiance: United States
- Branch: Ohio Army National Guard; United States Army Air Forces; United States Air Force
- Service years: 1938–1940; 1942–1978
- Rank: Lieutenant general
- Commands: Inspector General of the Air Force; Air Force Military Training Center; Air Command and Staff College
- Conflicts: World War II; Korean War; Vietnam War
- Awards: Air Force Cross; Air Force Distinguished Service Medal (2); Silver Star; Legion of Merit (3); Distinguished Flying Cross (7); Bronze Star Medal with "V"; Purple Heart (2); Air Medal (15)

Lieutenant General John Peter Flynn (17 July 1922 – 5 March 1997) was a lieutenant general in the United States Air Force (USAF) who served in World War II, the Korean War and the Vietnam War. He was the senior American prisoner of war in North Vietnam from October 1967 to March 1973. Following his release from captivity he continued his USAF career, finally serving as the 21st Inspector General of the Air Force.

== Early life and education ==
Flynn was born on 17 July 1922 in Cleveland, Ohio.

== Military career ==
Flynn enlisted in the Ohio Army National Guard on 20 September 1938 and was honorably discharged on 24 September 1940. He enlisted in the United States Army Reserve on 18 November 1942 and began air training on 18 February 1943. He was commissioned as a second lieutenant in the United States Army Air Forces and awarded his wings on 23 May 1944.

Flynn was assigned to the 31st Fighter Wing in Italy, where he flew P-51 Mustangs on bomber escort missions until the end of World War II. He was then transferred to the 20th Fighter Wing at Biggs Air Force Base, Texas. He then moved to Williams Air Force Base, Arizona, where he trained on the P-80 Shooting Star. He was assigned as an RF-80 reconnaissance pilot with the 67th Tactical Reconnaissance Wing at March Air Force Base, California, from September 1947 to July 1948.

In August 1948, Flynn was transferred to the 49th Fighter Wing at Misawa Air Base, Japan, serving there until February 1951. During the Korean War he flew combat missions over Korea from June 1950 to February 1951. Following his return from Japan he served with the 20th Fighter-Bomber Wing at Shaw Air Force Base, South Carolina, and then at Langley Air Force Base, Virginia, and then RAF Wethersfield, England, until August 1953. He then transferred to the 49th Air Division in England, serving there until May 1956, when he was assigned as chief of plans, 19th Air Force at Foster Air Force Base, Texas. He was promoted to major on 1 April 1955.

Flynn attended Armed Forces Staff College, graduating in June 1959. He then served as planning and programming officer, Astronautics and Missile Branch, Strategic Weapons Plans Division, Headquarters USAF in The Pentagon from July 1959 to February 1963. He attended the University of Maryland from February to August 1963. He then attended the National War College, graduating in July 1964. He also attended George Washington University, graduating with a degree in international relations in 1964. He was promoted to colonel on 1 July 1964 and then served as the deputy commander for operations, 49th Tactical Fighter Wing at Spangdahlem Air Base, West Germany, from August 1964 to June 1966, when he was appointed director of the Operational Readiness Inspection at Headquarters, United States Air Forces in Europe, Lindsey Air Station, West Germany.

In August 1967 Flynn was appointed deputy commander of the 388th Tactical Fighter Wing and began flying combat missions out of Korat Royal Thai Air Force Base, Thailand. On 27 October 1967 his F-105 Thunderchief was hit by a surface-to-air missile near Hanoi, he ejected and was captured. He was the highest-ranking American prisoner of war held by North Vietnam. Like many other prisoners Flynn endured torture and prolonged periods of solitary confinement. As the senior officer, Flynn assumed leadership of the American prisoners in what came to be called the 4th Allied Prisoner of War Wing. He was promoted to brigadier general on 1 May 1971 while in captivity, but was not advised of this promotion until after his release. He was released together with 107 other prisoners on 14 March 1973 as part of Operation Homecoming. On his release Flynn praised President Nixon and the American public who had supported the prisoners.

After his release, Flynn was assigned as vice commandant, Air War College in August 1973. In February 1974 he became the commandant, Air Command and Staff College. He was promoted to major general on 24 April 1974 and in August 1974 was appointed commander, Air Force Military Training Center. He assumed the position of Inspector General of the Air Force in September 1976. He was promoted to lieutenant general on 17 September 1976. He retired from the USAF on 1 October 1978.

== Later life and death ==
Flynn died on 5 March 1997 and was buried in Fort Sam Houston National Cemetery.

== Decorations ==
His military decorations and awards include:

Command Pilot Badge
| Air Force Cross |
| Air Force Distinguished Service Medal with two bronze oak leaf clusters |
| Silver Star |
| Legion of Merit with two bronze oak leaf clusters |
| Distinguished Flying Cross with Valor device, silver and bronze oak leaf clusters |
| Bronze Star Medal with Valor device |
| Purple Heart with bronze oak leaf cluster |
| Air Medal with two silver and two bronze oak leaf clusters |
| Air Medal with bronze oak leaf cluster (second ribbon required for accouterment spacing) |
| Army Commendation Medal |
| Air Force Presidential Unit Citation |
| Air Force Outstanding Unit Award with two bronze oak leaf clusters |
| Prisoner of War Medal |
| American Campaign Medal |
| European-African-Middle Eastern Campaign Medal with three bronze campaign stars |
| World War II Victory Medal |
| Army of Occupation Medal |
| National Defense Service Medal with service star |
| Korean Service Medal with three bronze campaign stars |
| Armed Forces Expeditionary Medal |
| Vietnam Service Medal with two silver and two bronze campaign stars |
| Vietnam Service Medal with bronze campaign star (second ribbon required for accouterment spacing) |
| Air Force Longevity Service Award with one silver and two bronze oak leaf clusters |
| Small Arms Expert Marksmanship Ribbon |
| Republic of Korea Presidential Unit Citation |
| Republic of Vietnam Gallantry Cross |
| United Nations Service Medal for Korea |
| Vietnam Campaign Medal |
| Korean War Service Medal |

=== Air Force Cross citation ===

Flynn, John Peter
Major General (then Colonel), U.S. Air Force
Prisoner of War, North Vietnam
Date of Action: 27 October 1967 to 10 November 1967

Citation:

The President of the United States of America, authorized by Title 10, Section 8742, United States Code, takes pleasure in presenting the Air Force Cross to Major General [then Colonel] John Peter Flynn, United States Air Force, for extraordinary heroism in military operations against an opposing armed force as a Prisoner of War in North Vietnam from 27 October 1967 to 10 November 1967. Captured at the height of the air war, General Flynn, the most senior officer in captivity, was exposed to forceful interrogation, intimidation, and brutal treatment because the enemy believe he was withholding valuable tactical information. Although suffering severe injuries, he was beaten and tortured for military information which, if obtained by the Vietnamese, would clearly have jeopardized the lives of those still flying. By his display of heroic resistance through this ordeal of extreme cruelties, General Flynn reflected the highest credit upon himself and the United States Air Force.
