= Air Force Inspection Agency =

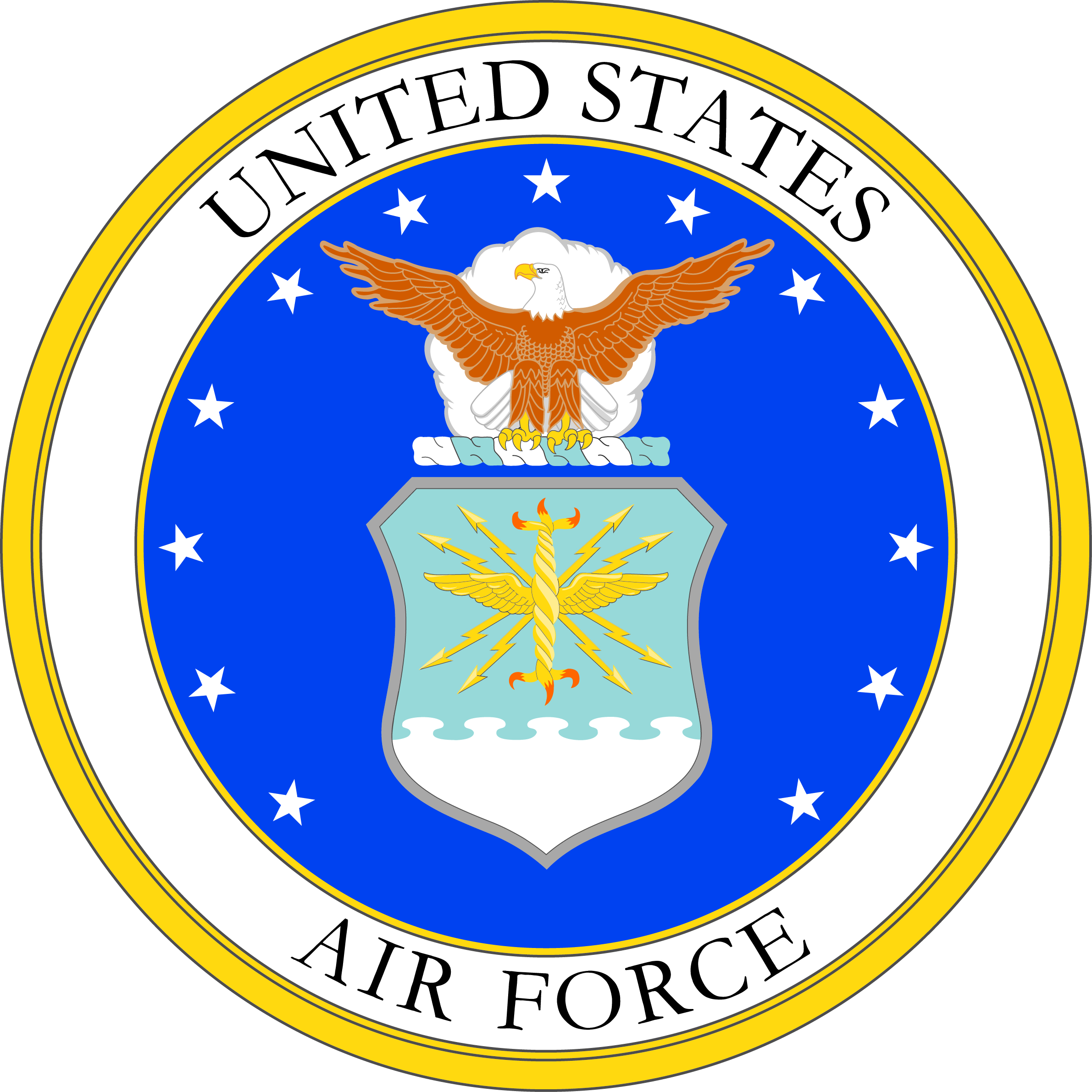
Department of the Air Force Inspection Agency

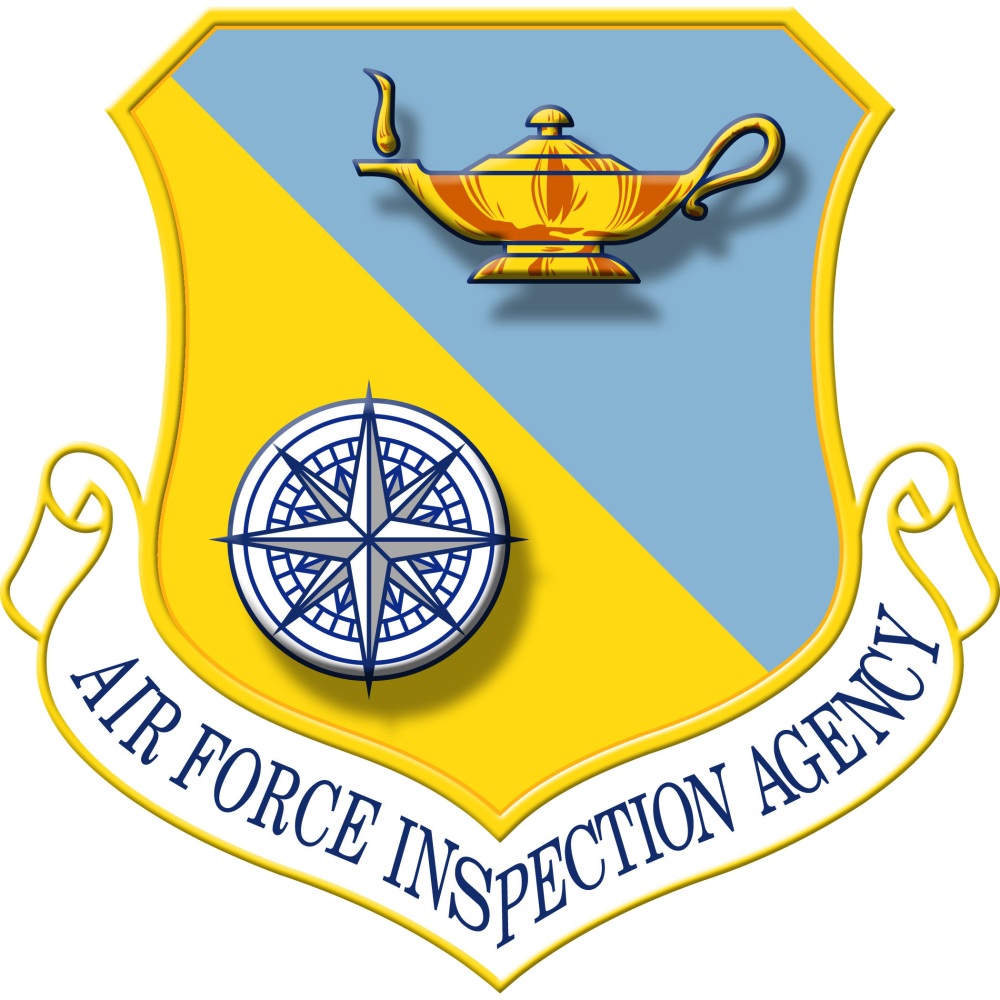
- Air Force Inspection Agency emblem
- Active: 31 December 1971 – present
- Country: United States
- Branch: United States Air Force
- Role: Evaluation and standardization
- Garrison/HQ: Kirtland Air Force Base
- Motto: "Knowledge-Honor-Vigilance"

Commanders
- Current commander: Colonel Deane R. Konowicz

The Department of the Air Force Inspection Agency operates as a U.S. Air Force Field Operating Agency under the direction of the Air Force inspector general. It provides independent assessments of acquisition, nuclear surety, operations, logistics, support, and healthcare to Air Force senior leadership. Additionally, the agency identifies deficiencies and recommends improvements for accomplishing peacetime and wartime missions. It also evaluates Air Force activities, personnel, and policies, and provides legal and compliance oversight of all Air Force-level Field Operating Agencies and Direct Reporting Units.

== Organization ==
The agency consists of six directorates: Enterprise Support, Inspections, Medical Operations, Mission Support, Nuclear Inspections, and Inspection Policy and Requirements. The Inspections Directorate schedules, coordinates, and executes Compliance Inspections, Nuclear Surety Inspection Oversight assessments, and conducts Compliance Inspections of all Field Operating Agencies and Direct Reporting Units. The Medical Operations Directorate performs Health Services Inspections of all Air Force active duty, Reserve, and Guard medical units worldwide in partnership with acknowledged expert civilian accrediting agencies. The Mission Support Directorate provides administrative and logistical support for the agency.

== History ==
The Department of the Air Force Inspection Agency traces its history back to 1927 with the establishment of the Inspection Division under the Chief of the Army Air Corps. The division performed technical inspections in support of flight safety objectives. By the end of World War II, this function was aligned under the Office of the Air Inspector. In 1948, after the Air Force became a separate service, the Chief of Staff of the Air Force designated the Office of the Inspector General to oversee all inspection and safety functions.

In the 1950s, all activities were consolidated at Norton Air Force Base, California, in the 1002d Inspector General Group commanded by the Deputy Inspector General for Inspection and Safety. On 31 December 1971, the Air Force Inspection and Safety Center was activated, replacing the 1002d Inspector General Group. In August 1991, the center was divided into the Air Force Inspection Agency and the Air Force Safety Agency (now the Air Force Safety Center). The Air Force Inspection Agency and the Safety Center moved to Kirtland Air Force Base, New Mexico, in July 1993, due to the closure of Norton.

In February 2021, the agency realigned Oversight/Evaluation Directorate’s resources into the Inspection and Nuclear Inspection directorates. The realignment enabled organizational efficiencies and postured the Agency to better address Secretary of the Air Force and Chief of Staff of the Air Force priorities on readiness and lethality while minimizing risk to the nuclear enterprise. Additionally, this reorganization realigned The Secretary's inspector general’s inspections policy directorate to fall under the agency and established the Inspection Policy and Requirements Directorate, Operating Location–Alpha, located at the Pentagon, Washington, DC. Since the agency serves both the United States Air Force and the United States Space Force, it was renamed the Department of the Air Force Inspection Agency,
