= List of Embry–Riddle Aeronautical University alumni =

Embry Riddle has a large pool of notable alumni ranging from high military officials, politicians, airline business leaders, intelligence agency officials, and White House advisors, along with six NASA astronauts, one Canadian Space Agency astronaut, and two commercial astronauts. Embry–Riddle Aeronautical University is the only accredited aviation-oriented university in the world. The university offers bachelor's and master's degrees at two residential campuses and through Embry–Riddle Worldwide. Associate degrees and non-degree programs are also offered by Embry–Riddle Worldwide. Doctoral degrees are exclusively offered by Embry–Riddle's Daytona Beach campus.

== Notable alumni ==
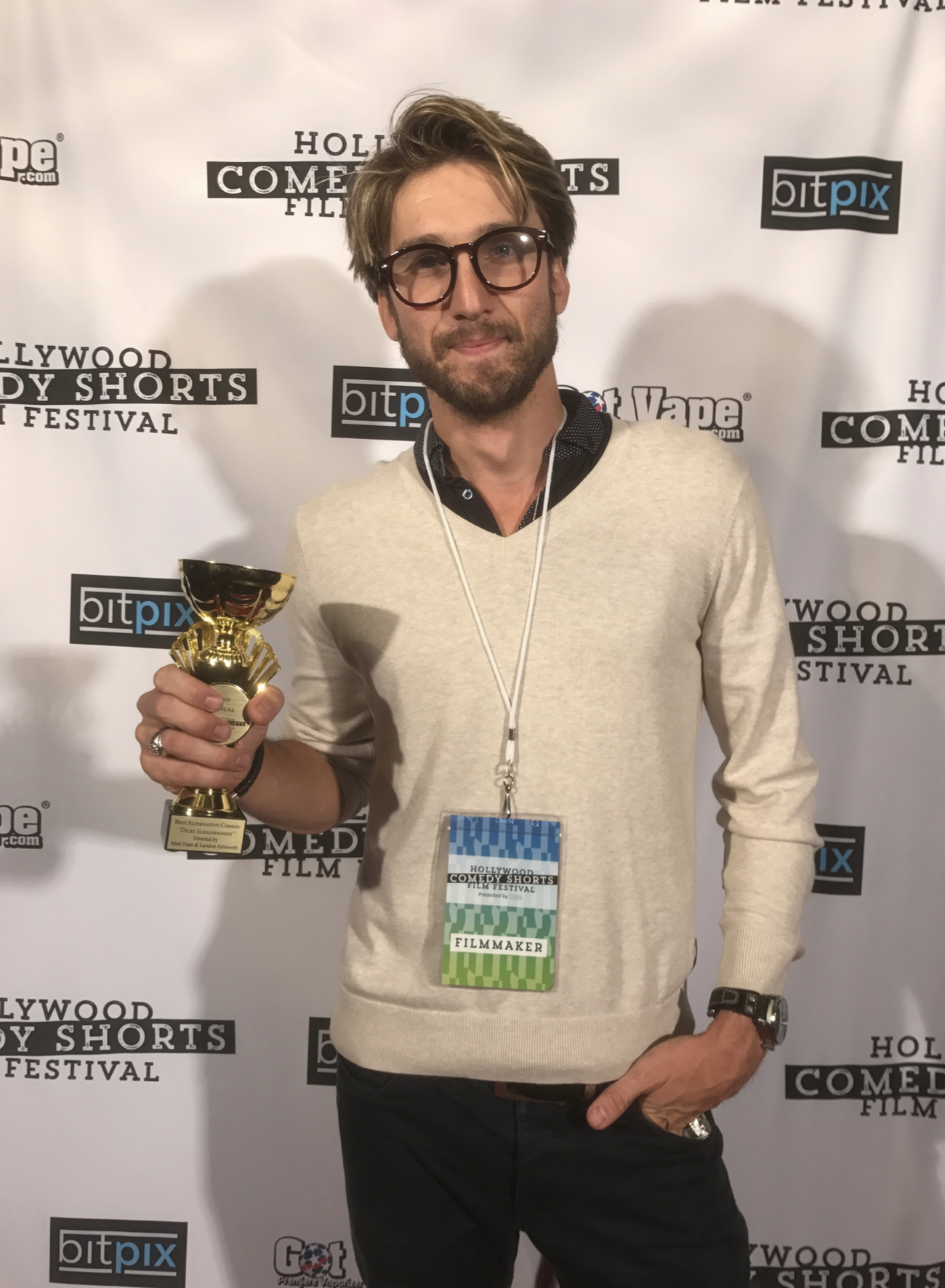
Landon Ashworth winning "best director" in 2019 at the Hollywood Film Festival

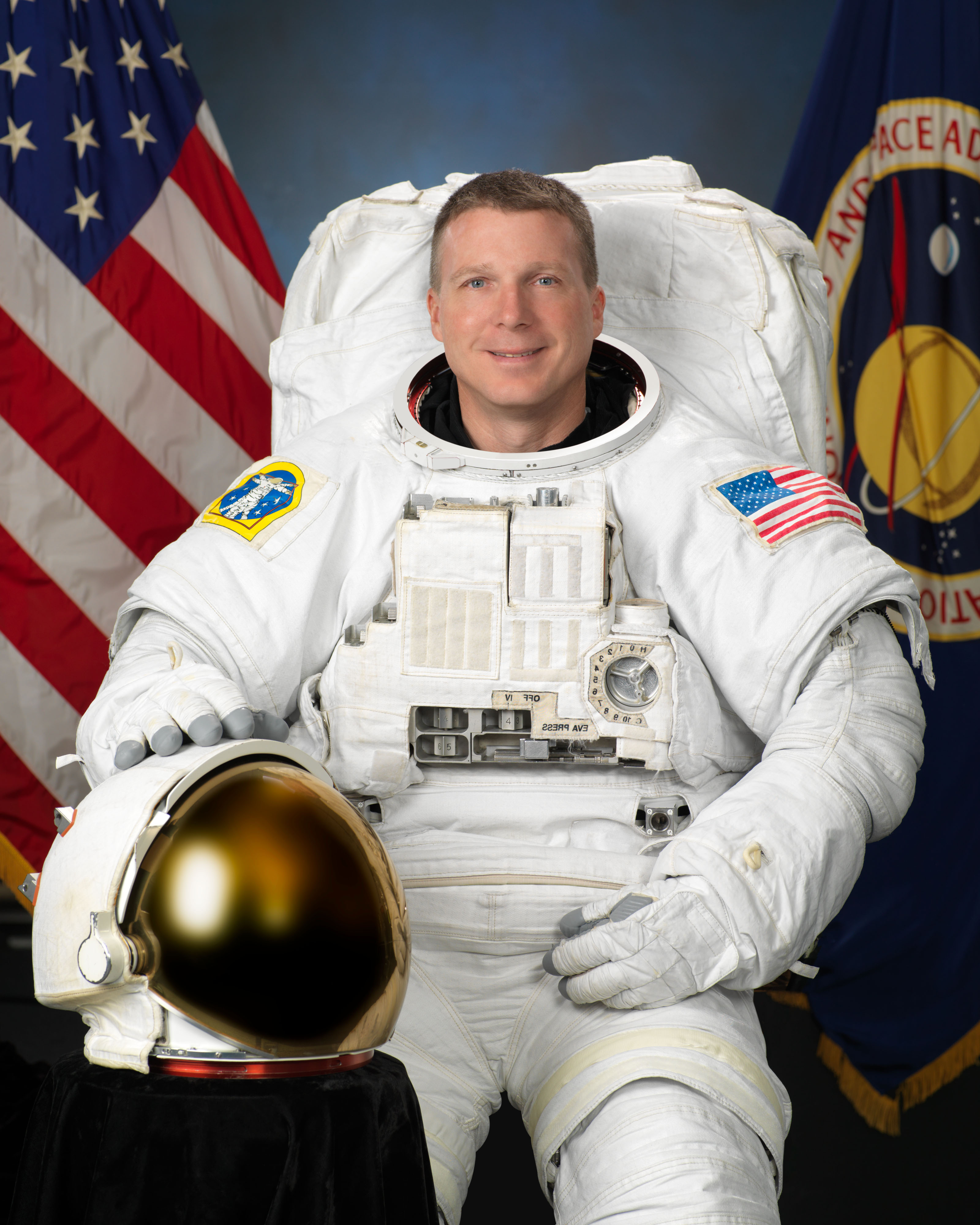
Astronaut Terry Virts, commander of International Space Station

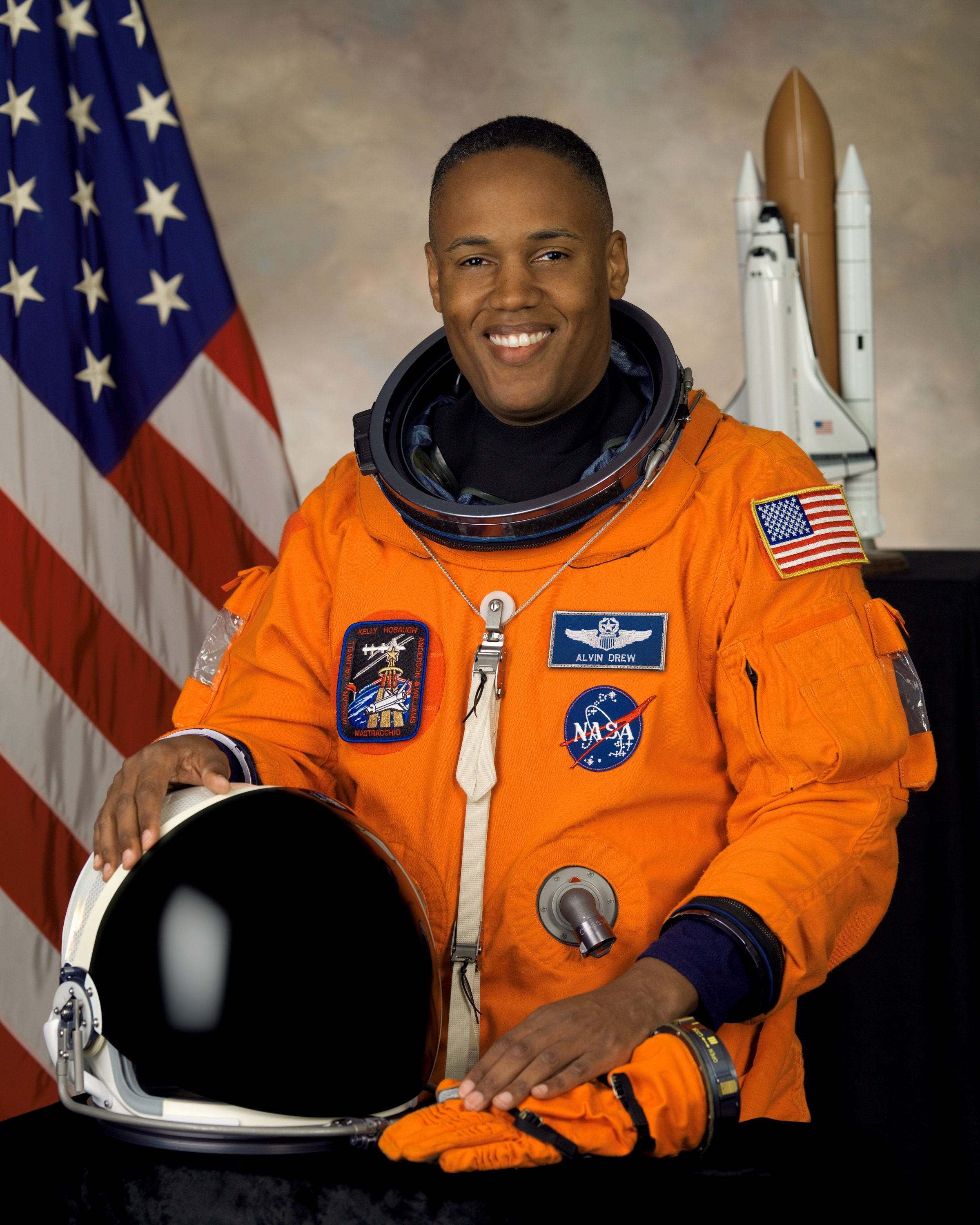
Astronaut Alvin Drew

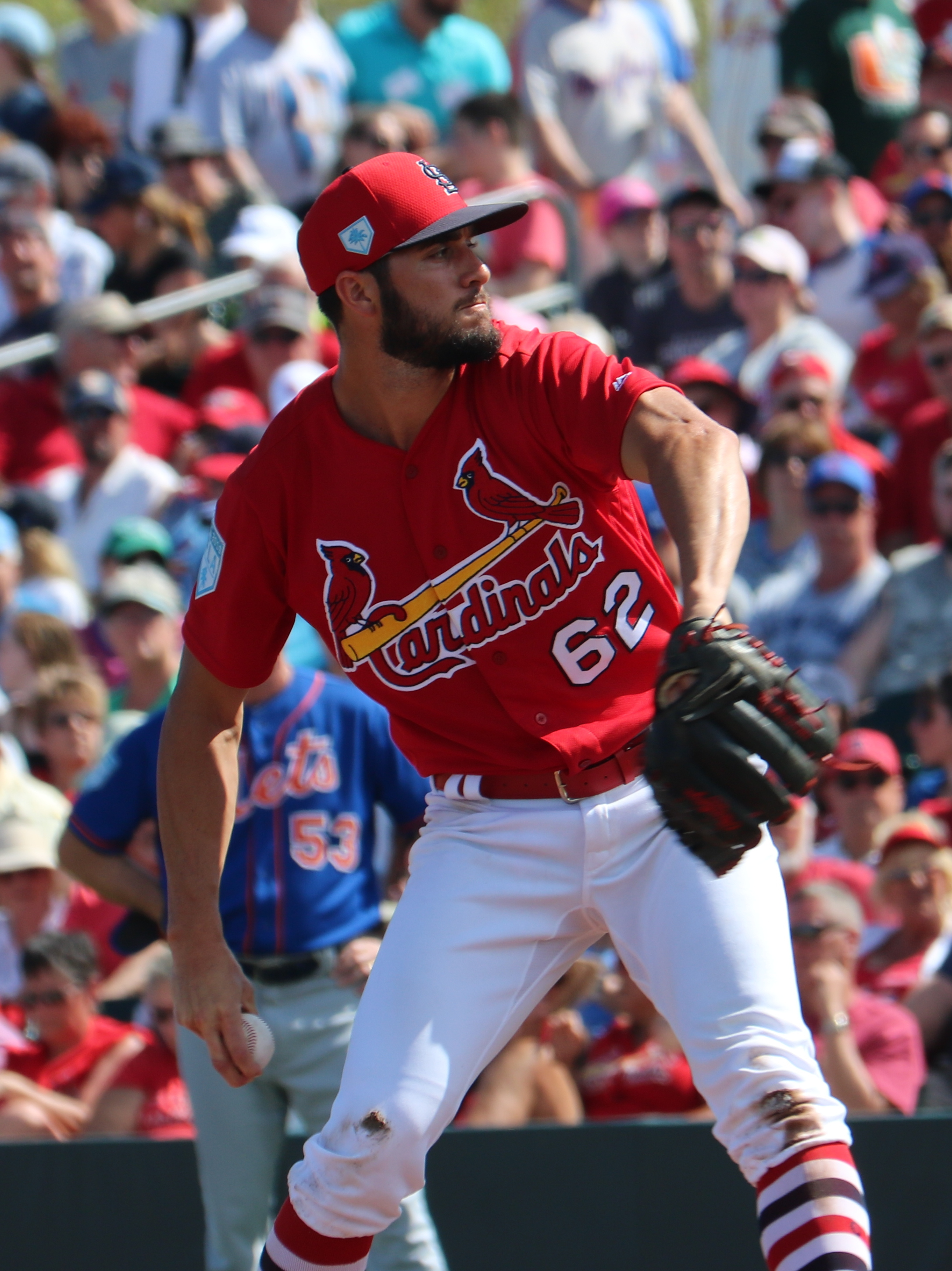
Daniel Ponce de Leon

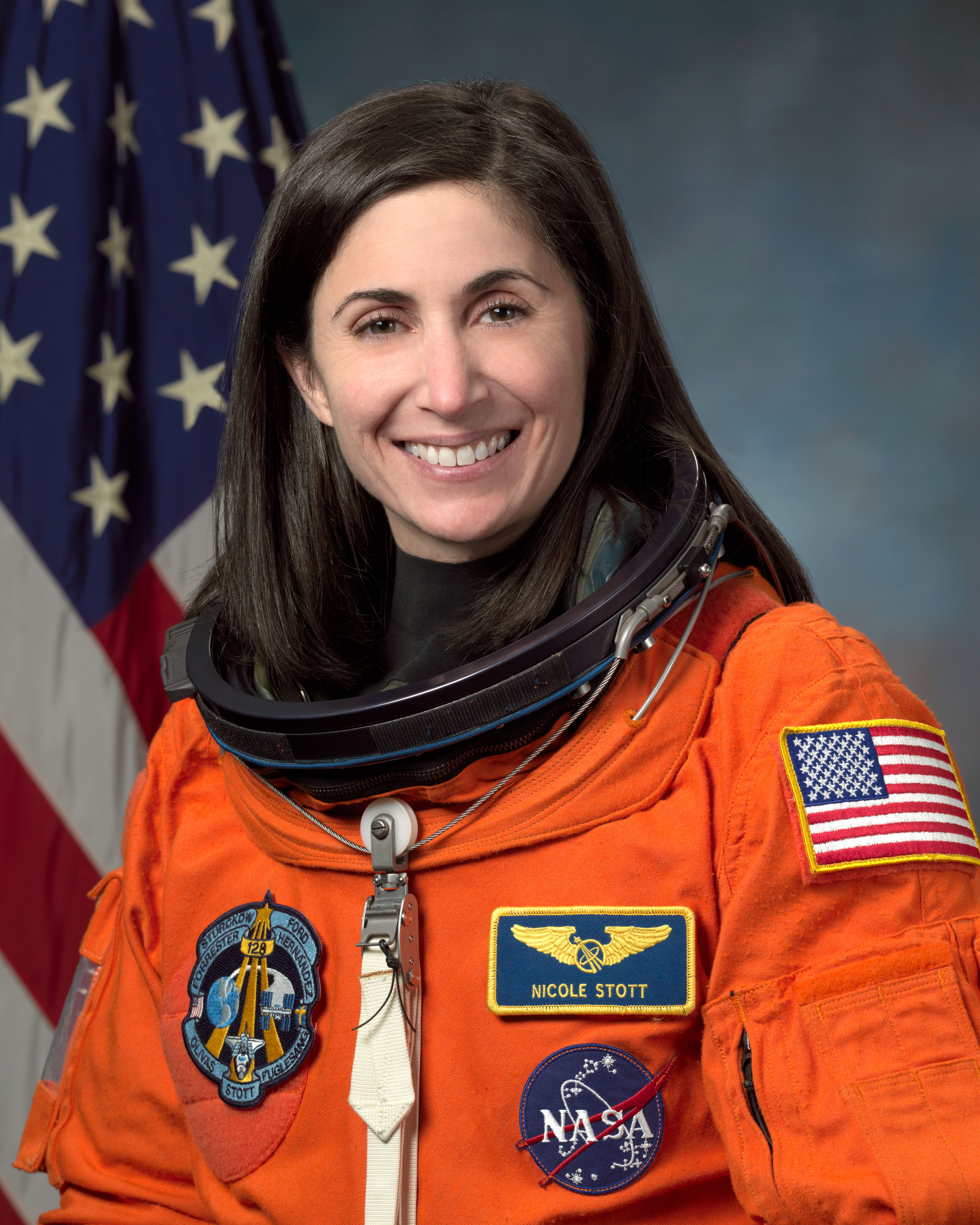
Astronaut Nicole Stott

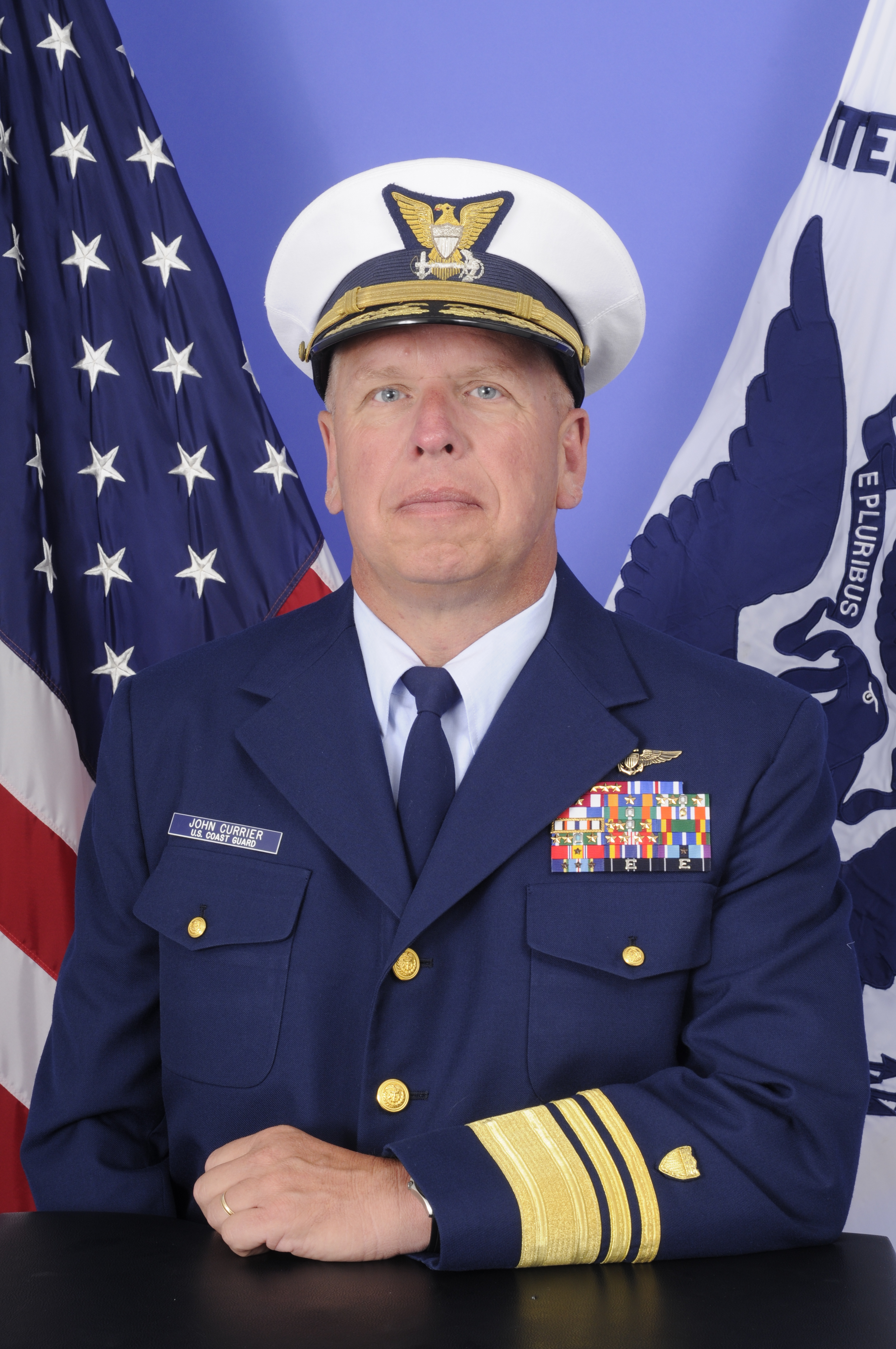
28th Vice Commandant of USCG John Currier

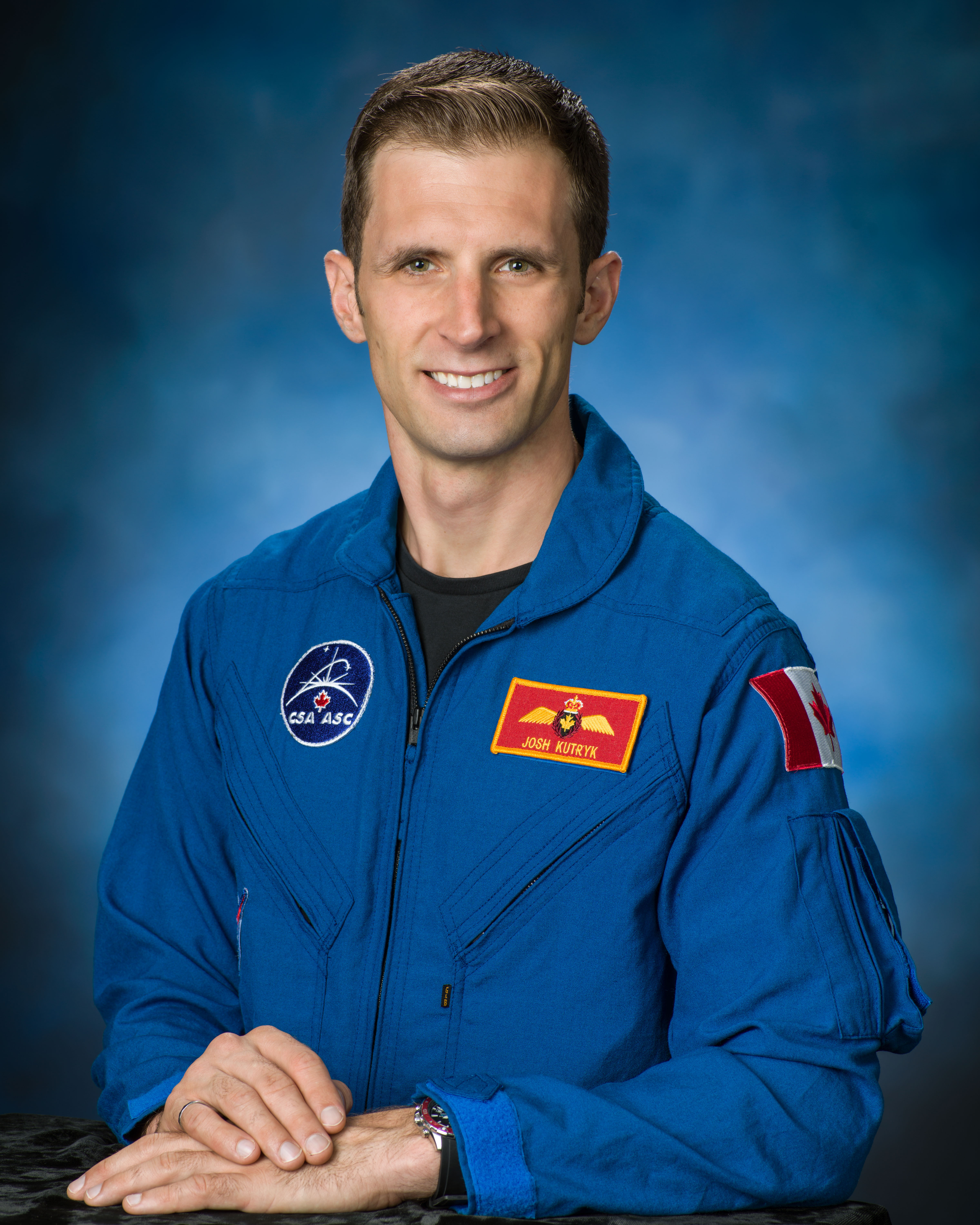
Canadian astronaut Josh Kutryk

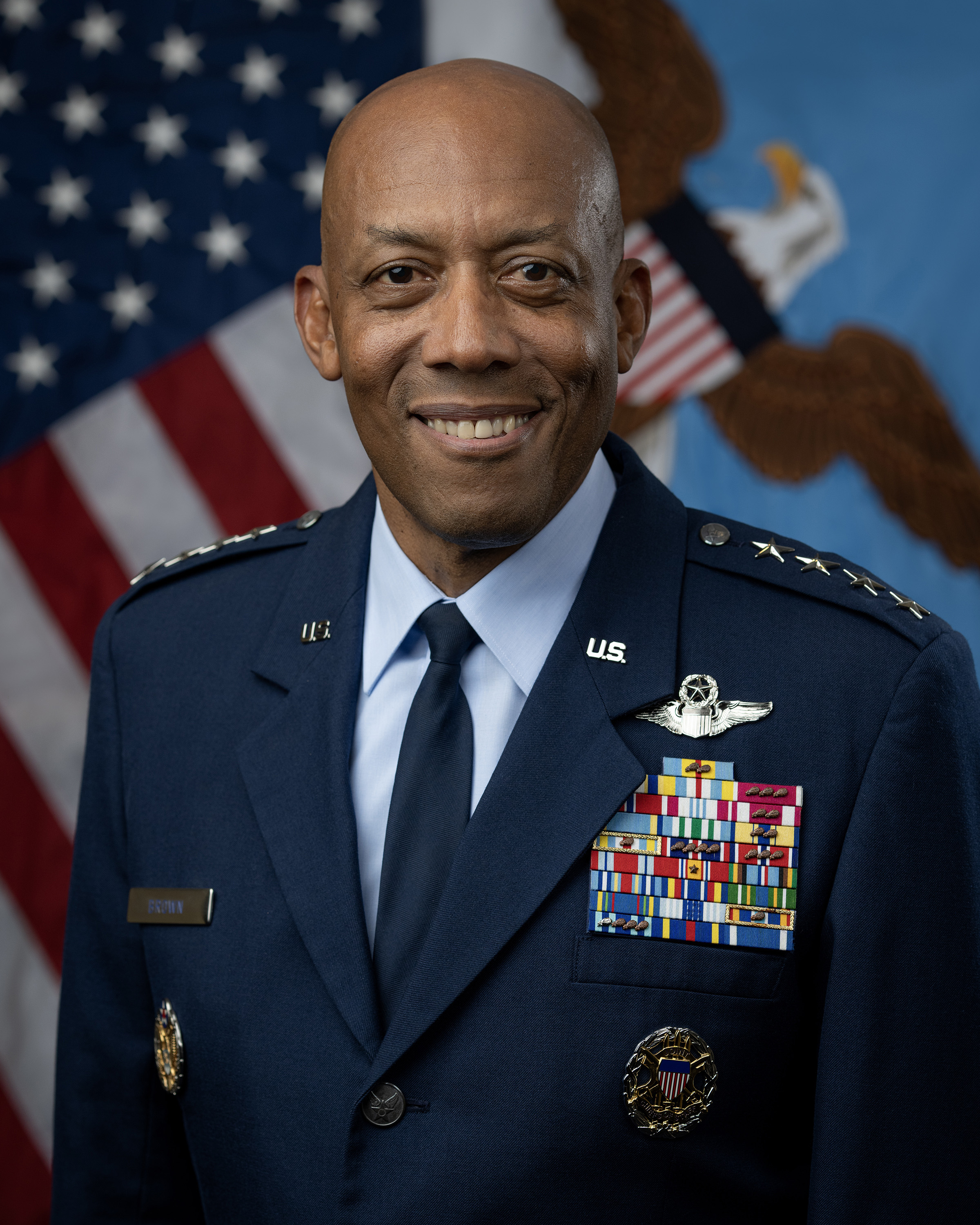
Gen. Charles Q. Brown, 21st Chairman of the Joint Chiefs of Staff. First African-American appointed as chief of staff and first African-American to lead any branch of the United States Armed Forces.

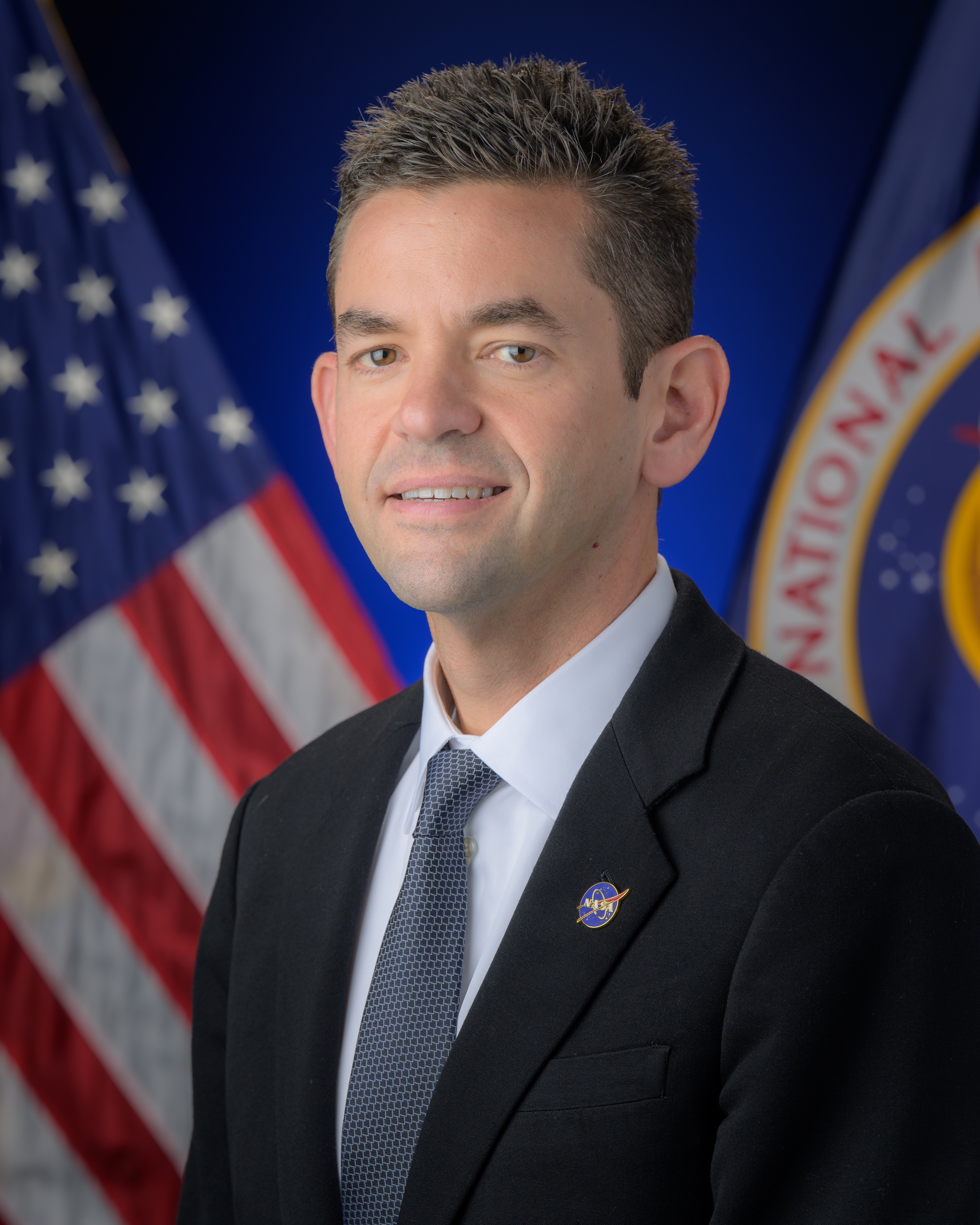
Jared Isaacman, 15th administrator of NASA

Alumni	Class −	Notability
Matthew P. Anderson	2009	16th Deputy Administrator of NASA
Landon Ashworth	2004 & 2009	Test pilot, astrophysicist, film maker
JoAnne S. Bass	2005	Chief Master Sergeant of the Air Force
Edward K. Beale	2007	Author and retired United States Coast Guard commander
Mark H. Berry	1983	Arkansas state representative
Gregory A. Biscone	1993	United States Air Force Inspector General and deputy director of operations at United States Central Command
Ben Brainard		Stand-up comedian and social media personality
Kevin Bratcher	1995	Republican politician and member of the Kentucky House of Representatives; House Majority Whip
Charles Q. Brown Jr.	1994	General, US Air Force, 21st Chairman of the Joint Chiefs of Staff; 22nd chief of staff of the Air Force; first African-American to be appointed as chief of staff and to lead any branch of the United States Armed Forces
Daniel C. Burbank	1991	Astronaut and US Coast Guard captain
Dan Carter		Republican member of Connecticut House of Representatives
Jeffrey B. Cashman	1996	Air National Guard brigadier general
Donna L. Cottrell	1997	US Coast Guard rear admiral; Coast Guard District 9 commander; former director of Joint Interagency Task Force West, the U.S. Pacific Command’s executive liaison
John Currier	1998	US Coast Guard vice commandant of the Coast Guard
Stephen L. Davis	1997	US Air Force brigadier general, director of global operations, U.S. Strategic Command
Glen Doherty		Navy SEAL killed in the 2012 Benghazi Attack; was working for a contracted CIA group
Jerry Doyle		Nationally syndicated talk show host, television actor and founder of the content platform EpicTimes
Benjamin Alvin Drew	1995	Astronaut; US Air Force lieutenant colonel
Michael Durant	1995	US Army Chief Warrant Officer 4 helicopter pilot shot down and taken prisoner during the Battle of Mogadishu; received the POW Medal, Purple Heart, Bronze Star, and three times the Distinguished Flying Cross
Connally Edozien	2001	Nigerian football player who plays for the Carolina RailHawks FC
Greg Feith	1996	Retired senior air safety Investigator with the National Transportation Safety Board
David Floyd		Politician and former Republican member of the Kentucky House of Representatives for District 50
Ronald J. Garan, Jr.	1995	Astronaut and US Air Force colonel
Amber Gell		Space industry executive, former program manager and engineer
Ingo Gerhartz	2021	Inspector of the German Air Force
Vicente Gonzalez	1992	Attorney and politician serving as the United States representative for the 15th district of Texas
Gerry Gouveia		Founder and CEO of Roraima Airways
Alan Gustafson	1996	NASCAR Cup Series crew chief
Nancy Hann		Rear admiral, deputy director of the NOAA Corps
Hubert C. Hegtvedt	1997	U.S. Air Force major general, deputy director for global policy and partnerships, at the Pentagon
Richard D. Heinz	2001	US Navy rear admiral, director of logistics, J4, on the Joint Chiefs of Staff, U.S. European Command
John Hodgson	2007	Kentucky state representative
Sara Hradecky	2004	24th Canadian ambassador to the United States of Mexico
Jared Isaacman	2011	15th administrator of NASA, businessman and pilot; founder of Draken International; co-founder and CEO of Harbortouch; set a world record in 2009 for flying around the globe Commercial astronaut commander of the Inspiration4 and Polaris Dawn missions
Alvin B. Jackson		Utah Senator, father of NBA player Frank Jackson
James F. Jackson	1990	Lieutenant general in the United States Air Force and chief of Air Force Reserve Command
Moriba K. Jah	1999	Aerodynamicist; former spacecraft navigator for NASA Jet Propulsion Laboratory; served on Mars Global Surveyor, Mars Odyssey, and Mars Express (joint mission with European Space Agency)
Brent A. Jones		Politician, Nevada Assembly member, lawyer, and CEO of Affinity Lifestyles
Janis Karpinski		US Army, former brigadier general
Susan Kilrain	1982	Astronaut and Navy commander
Tony Kurtz		Politician and businessman Wisconsin State Assembly member, founder/CEO of Kaynick Solutions LLC
Joshua Kutryk	2009	Canadian astronaut with Canadian Space Agency; Royal Canadian Air Force lt. colonel
Vivek Lall		Chief executive of US defense and nuclear giant General Atomics Global Corporation on Sunday; former vice president, aeronautics strategy and business development at Lockheed Martin
Jamail Larkins		Youngest American to fly a powered aircraft solo; Federal Aviation Administration ambassador for Aviation and Space Education
Irene Leverton	Flight Classes	Aviation pioneer; member of the Ninety-Nines; selected in 1061 for the Women in Space Program; one of the Mercury 13 project women
Erik Lindbergh		Aviator, adventurer, and public speaker; grandson of pioneering aviator Charles Lindbergh
Alan Lindenmoyer	1983	NASA engineer, manager of NASA's Commercial Crew and Cargo Program Office (C3PO) at Johnson Space Center
Kelly McCarthy	1999	Montana House of Representatives
Nick Mingione	2000	University of Kentucky Wildcats baseball head coach
Scott O'Grady	1989	Assistant Secretary of Defense for International Security Affairs nominee; US Air Force F-16 pilot who evaded capture after being shot down over Bosnia in 1995
Kraig Paulsen	1994	Iowa state representative and minority whip
Jake Pavelka		Television personality and actor
Erik A. Peterson	2000	Brigadier general, adjutant general for Air of the Wisconsin National Guard
August Pfluger		Representative for Texas's 11th congressional district in the United States House of Representatives
Daniel Ponce de Leon		Professional baseball pitcher
John I. Pray	1987	Retired U.S. Air Force brigadier general, chief executive officer and president of Operation Homefront
Carol Rabadi	1999	Captain of the first all Arab female flight crew for Royal Jordanian
Fouad Mahoud Hasan Al Rabia	1988	Executive of Kuwait's national airline, was held prisoner extrajudicial detention at the Guantanamo Bay detainment camp without formal charges
Todd J. McCubbin	2004	U.S. Air Force brigadier general
Timothy Ray	1998	US Air Force general, commander of Air Force Global Strike Command; concurrently serves as the commander of Air Forces Strategic – Air, United States Strategic Command
Tom Reeder		Wyoming House of Representatives
Robertus Remkes	1987	US Air Force major general and director of strategy, plans and policy for the United States European Command
Fernando L. Ribas-Dominicci	1985	US Air Force major, killed during Operation El Dorado Canyon
Anthony J. Rock	1995	Lieutenant general of the U.S. Air Force and last served as the Inspector General of the Air Force assigned within the Office of the Secretary of the Air Force
Marc H. Sasseville	1996	U.S. Air Force brigadier general, chief, National Guard Bureau; Joint Chief of Staff member
Christopher Sembroski	2007	American data engineer, Air Force veteran, and commercial astronaut, who flew to orbit on the private Inspiration4 mission
Keith J. Stalder	1994	United States Marine Corps lieutenant general
Cheryl Stearns	1985	Skydiver; won bronze in Overall in Individual Style and Accuracy at the XXV World Parachuting Championships; won gold medal in the category "Overall, Women" in 1978 and 1994
Nicole P. Stott	1987	Astronaut
Fred Strahorn		Democratic Ohio House of Representatives minority leader of the 131st Ohio General Assembly
Robert L. Sumwalt		14th chairman of the National Transportation Safety Board
Fred Strahorn		Democratic Ohio House of Representatives minority leader of the 131st Ohio General Assembly
Merryl Tengesdal	2008	US Air Force colonel; first and only African-American woman to fly the United States Air Force's U-2 spy plane; former director of inspections
Terry W. Virts	1997	Astronaut, International Space Station commander and US Air Force colonel
Victor Wainwright		Blues singer, songwriter, and pianist
Shaesta Waiz		First female certified civilian pilot from Afghanistan; youngest woman to fly solo around the world in a single-engine aircraft
Dave Wallace	1977	Member of the Arkansas House of Representatives for Mississippi County, Arkansas; decorated United States Army officer of the Vietnam War
Patrice Washington	1982	Florida; first female pilot of Bahamasair; first black female captain of a major U.S. air service and first black female pilot hired by the United Parcel Service
Brandon Webb		Author; former United States Navy SEAL and SEAL Sniper course head instructor; founder and CEO of Hurricane Group Inc, which includes sofrep.com
Jack Weinstein	1987	US Air Force major general
Robert E. Wheeler	1995	U.S. Air Force brigadier general
Zoey Williams		First Black female pilot to fly a Boeing 777 for Air Canada
Chuck Wilson	1985	United States Air Force (retired) colonel; former director of the Office of International Security Operations (ISO) with the Bureau of Political-Military Affairs; former senior Air Force advisor at the State Department; shortly after the September 11 attacks, was promoted to serve on the Joint Chiefs of Staff (JCS) at the Pentagon
Daniel P. Woodward	1980	U.S. Air Force brigadier general and pilot
Margaret H. Woodward	1997	Major general in the United States Air Force; commander of the 17th Air Force and U.S. Air Forces Africa, Ramstein Air Base, Germany; was responsible for all US air actions that involved Africa
Robert Speeler	1999	ULA Propulsion Engineer for Space Shuttle Program. Awarded the Directors Award in 2010 for discovering and diagnosing a life-threatening issue.
