= List of Embry–Riddle Aeronautical University, Daytona Beach alumni =

Following is a list of notable alumni of Embry–Riddle Aeronautical University, Daytona Beach.

== Aviation ==
Name	Class	Notability	References
Irene Leverton	non-degreed	Aviation pioneer and member of the Ninety-Nines, Women in Space Program, and the Mercury 13 project women	
Erik Lindbergh		Aviator, adventurer, and public speaker	
Carol Rabadi	1999	Captain of the first all-Arab female flight crew for Royal Jordanian	
Shaesta Waiz		First female certified civilian pilot from Afghanistan and youngest woman to fly solo around the world in a single-engine aircraft	
Patrice Washington	1982	First woman pilot of Bahamasair and first black female pilot hired by the United Parcel Service	

== Business ==
Name	Class	Notability	References
Jared Isaacman		Founder of Draken International, co-founder and CEO of Harbortouch, and record holder for flying around the globe	
Vivek Lall		Chief executive of General Atomics Global Corporation and former vice president of Lockheed Martin	
Fouad Mahoud Hasan Al Rabia	1988	Executive of Kuwait's national airline, was imprisoned at the Guantanamo Bay detainment camp without formal charges	

== Entertainment ==
Name	Class	Notability	References
Ben Brainard		Stand-up comedian and social media personality	
Jerry Doyle		Nationally syndicated talk show host, television actor, and founder of the content platform EpicTimes	
Jake Pavelka		Television Personality and actor	
Victor Wainwright		Blues singer, songwriter, and pianist	

== Government and civil service ==
Name	Class	Notability	References
Greg Feith	1996	Retired senior air safety investigator with the National Transportation Safety Board	
Craig Fugate		Former administrator of Federal Emergency Management Agency	
Robert L. Sumwalt		Chairman of the National Transportation Safety Board	

== Military ==
Name	Class	Notability	References
Edward K. Beale	2007	Author and retired United States Coast Guard commander	
Gregory A. Biscone	1993	United States Air Force inspector general and deputy director of operations at United States Central Command	
Charles Q. Brown Jr.	1994	General, US Air Force, chief of staff of the Air Force	
Jeffrey B. Cashman	1996	Air National Guard brigadier general	
Donna L. Cottrell	1997	US Coast Guard rear admiral	
John Currier	1998	US Coast Guard vice commandant of the Coast Guard	
Stephen L. Davis	1997	US Air Force brigadier general, director of global operations, U.S. Strategic Command	
Glen Doherty		Navy SEAL killed in the 2012 Benghazi Attack; he was working for a contracted CIA group	
Michael Durant	1995	US Army Chief Warrant Officer 4 helicopter pilot shot down and taken prisoner during the Battle of Mogadishu	
Nancy Hann		Rear admiral, deputy director of the NOAA Corps	
Hubert C. Hegtvedt	1997	U.S. Air Force major general, deputy director for global policy and partnerships, at The Pentagon	
Richard D. Heinz	2001	US Navy rear admiral, director of logistics, J4, on the Joint Chiefs of Staff, U.S. European Command	
James F. Jackson	1990	Lieutenant general in the United States Air Force and chief of Air Force Reserve Command	
Janis Karpinski		Brigadier general in the U.S. Army	
Todd J. McCubbin	2004	U.S. Air Force brigadier general	
Scott O'Grady	1989	US Air Force F-16 pilot who evaded capture after being shot down over Bosnia in 1995	
John I. Pray	1987	Retired U.S. Air Force brigadier general, chief executive officer, and president of Operation Homefront	
Timothy Ray	1998	US Air Force general, commander of Air Force Global Strike Command	
Robertus Remkes	1987	US Air Force major general and director of strategy, plans and policy for the United States European Command	
Fernando L. Ribas-Dominicci	1985	US Air Force major, killed during Operation El Dorado Canyon	
Anthony J. Rock	1995	Lieutenant general of the U.S. Air Force	
Marc H. Sasseville	1996	U.S. Air Force brigadier general, chief, National Guard Bureau. Joint Chief of Staff member	
Keith J. Stalder	1994	United States Marine Corps lieutenant general	
Merryl Tengesdal	2008	US Air Force colonel; first African American woman to fly the United States Air Force's U-2 spy plane	
Brandon Webb		Author, and former United States Navy SEAL and SEAL sniper course head instructor	
Jack Weinstein	1987	US Air Force major general	
Robert E. Wheeler	1995	U.S. Air Force brigadier general	
Chuck Wilson	1985	United States Air Force (retired) colonel, former director of the Office of International Security Operations	
Daniel P. Woodward	1980	U.S. Air Force brigadier general and pilot	
Margaret H. Woodward	1997	Major general in the United States Air Force, commander of the 17th Air Force and Ramstein Air Base	

== Politics ==
Name	Class	Notability	References
Kevin Bratcher	1995	Kentucky House of Representatives	
Dan Carter		Connecticut House of Representatives	
David Floyd		Kentucky House of Representatives	
Vicente Gonzalez	1992	United States House of Representatives	
Alvin B. Jackson		Utah State Senate	
Brent A. Jones		Nevada Assembly	
Tony Kurtz		Wisconsin State Assembly	
Kelly McCarthy	1999	Montana House of Representatives	
Kraig Paulsen	1994	Iowa state representative and minority whip	
August Pfluger		United States House of Representatives	
John Ragan		Tennessee House of Representatives	
Tom Reeder		Wyoming House of Representatives	
Fred Strahorn		Ohio House of Representatives	
Dave Wallace	1977	Arkansas House of Representatives	

== Science and engineering ==
Name	Class	Notability	References
Daniel C. Burbank	1991	Astronaut and US Coast Guard captain	
Benjamin Alvin Drew	1995	Astronaut; US Air Force lieutenant colonel	
Ronald J. Garan, Jr.	1995	Astronaut and US Air Force colonel	
Amber Gell		Rocket scientist, NASA engineer	
Moriba K. Jah	1999	Spacecraft navigator for NASA Jet Propulsion Laboratory and aerodynamicist with Mars Global Surveyor, Mars Odyssey, and Mars Express	
Susan Kilrain	1982	Astronaut and Navy commander	
Joshua Kutryk	2009	Canadian astronaut with Canadian Space Agency and Royal Canadian Air Force lt. colonel	
Irene Leverton	non-degreed	Aviation pioneer and member of the Ninety-Nines, Women in Space Program, and the Mercury 13 project women	
Alan Lindenmoyer	1983	NASA engineer, manager of NASA's Commercial Crew and Cargo Program Office at Johnson Space Center	
Nicole P. Stott	1987	Astronaut	
Terry W. Virts	1997	Astronaut, International Space Station commander and US Air Force colonel	

== Sports ==
Name	Class	Notability	References
Daniel Ponce de Leon		Professional baseball pitcher	
Connally Edozien	2001	Nigerian football player who plays for the Carolina RailHawks FC	
Alan Gustafson	1996	NASCAR Cup Series crew chief	
Nick Mingione	2000	University of Kentucky Wildcats baseball head coach	
Cheryl Stearns	1985	American skydiver and medalist in the World Parachuting Championships	
