= Rumble in the Morning =

Radio program in Virginia, US

- Country of origin: United States
- Language: English
- Home station: WNOR
- Hosted by: Rick Rumble

Rumble in the Morning is a comic radio program broadcast weekday mornings on WNOR in Virginia and hosted by Rick Rumble.

== Programming ==
The show is scheduled to air weekdays from 5:30AM to 10:00AM (though they often begin and end several minutes late, sometimes going to 10:15). The host(s) typically begin the program by announcing what is coming up on the show that day. They then take calls from their listeners. They continue taking listener calls throughout the day, in addition to reading some listener e-mails and text messages. Daily they will introduce a particularly ridiculous, confusing, or embarrassing news clip called “Stupid News” this is done 3 times during the show.

In addition to the regular news, traffic, and sports reports, the Rumble in the morning show has a number of segments unique to their show, including:

- "Stupid News" (Daily at 6:45AM and 8:45AM) - Reports of real-life news events which seem to result from lack of intelligence or logic. A "bonus" item is also recorded to be played by Nick, FM99's afternoon DJ, at 4pm.
- "Ask Shelley" (Mondays) - Shelley replies to questions from listeners, no matter how personal or explicit for sure.
- "Facebook Fights" (Tuesdays) - Staff members act out social media scuffles for the amusement of themselves and the audience.
- "The Reach-Around" (Wednesdays) - Strange, funny, or illogical audio discovered on the World Wide Web. Previously done daily under the branding "Idiots On The Internet".
- "Wheel of interviews" (Wednesday, infrequently) - Rumble conducts an interview in which he pranks the interviewee(s) by assuming a different personality or some sort of disorder done very well.
- "What's on Craigslist?" (Thursdays) - Strange, funny, or illogical postings found on the Craigslist website. Mostly restricted to the 6:00 and 9:00 hours due to the frequently salacious content.
- "The News You Missed" (Friday) - Rumble lampoons real-life news events from the past week.
- "Video Game Report" (Friday) - Shelley and Eric present a comical rundown of video game news.
- "Rumble in the Streets" - Rumble interviews people on the street at different local events

The Rumble in the Morning show also conducts formal interviews with celebrities, politicians, authors, heads or members of organizations, and even ordinary citizens who were somehow involved in news stories. The show is also known for conducting fake celebrity phone interviews, for which Rumble and staff members impersonate the celebrity in question or for which a real-life interview is edited for humorous effect. Among the celebrities who have received this treatment are George W. Bush, Bill Clinton, Larry Flynt, Michael Jackson (and Michael Jackson's brain), Michael Vick, Barney Frank, and Paula Abdul.

On Thursday, the show often welcomes into the studio a comedian who is due to perform at The Funny Bone in Virginia Beach that weekend. Among the comedians who have been guests on the show are Tommy Davidson, Jim Florentine, Ralphie May, Aries Spears, Harland Williams, John Witherspoon, and, perhaps most frequently, the now deceased J. Medicine Hat.

== Staff ==
Among the other correspondents working on the FM99 radio program are Sean Hood, the show's news director, Sports Director Rod Fitzwell, Rina, who runs the board and maintains the Facebook page, and Mike Alexander the traffic correspondent.

== History ==
The FM99 morning show originated in the 1980s, when it was called Reeger & the Bull and hosted by Ron Reeger and Henry Del Toro, a.k.a. "The Bull". When Reeger left, he was replaced by Jimmy Ray Dunn and the show became Jimmy & the Bull, until Dunn left in 1990.

From 1990 through 1995, the show was called Tommy & the Bull, hosted by Tommy Griffiths and Del Toro.

Del Toro left the show and WNOR in June 1995, and was replaced by Rick Rumble. Griffiths ultimately sued Del Toro in 1996 on the grounds of slander after being called "whiff boy" by Del Toro;

Together, Tommy and Rumble produced thirteen CDs benefiting their radio station's Christmas Wish Fund:

- Gold (1996)
- Yesss!!! (1997)
- Who's Yo' Daddy? (1997)
- Have a Cigar (1998)
- Greetings from Virginia Beach (1999)
- How Much to Have a Party (2000)
- Red, White and Blue (offered with 3 different covers) (2001)
- Those Guys Blow Chunks (2002)
- Queer Eye for the Morning Guy (2003)
- Wardrobe Malfunction (2004)
- The Wurst Of Tommy And Rumble (2005)
- iPuds (2006)
- ZEROS (2007)

On 30 July 2009, Tommy Griffiths and board operator Eric were suspended for airing an unedited 9-1-1 call containing explicit language. Four days later, on 3 August, Griffiths announced his resignation from the radio show, which he leaves to a now partnerless Rick Rumble.

The official name of the radio show is now Rumble in the Morning.

The previous news correspondent, Nikki Reed, worked on the show for thirteen years. Reed gave her last newscast on June 27, 2007. Shelley, who received a job at the station thanks to Reed and who was the show's producer, assumed Reed's post on June 28. In 2023 Shelley left the morning show to have more time with her family, but still works at the station as an on-air personality during the daytime from 10 - 2. Sean Hood now covers the news. Sportscaster Rod Fitzwell left the show in November 2005 and was replaced for one year by Jason "The Showwrecker." Jason then started working on the show's website, becoming Jason "The Webwrecker", who left the show in early 2007. Sports Director Rod Fitzwell returned to the show in late 2009.

A former member of the morning show staff is Chuck Cooney, who began working at the station as an intern in the 1990s and who is currently a producer at the radio station. Recognized for his distinctive high-pitched, nasally voice, Chuck is popularly known as "Chuck the Intern", a name he is known by even today. In addition to his current duties as producer, Chuck contributes his voice to advertisements for FM99 sponsors (notably for The Funny Bone) as well as radio bits and commercial bumpers for the morning show. Chuck returned to the morning show temporarily during the first week of August 2009 until Eric returned from suspension on 7 August.

Over the years, Tommy and Rumble created countless popular radio comedy bits. Their most famous bits include "Elmo's Got a Gun" (often mistaken as a "Weird Al" Yankovic song), "Dicken's Cider," "I Wanna Be a Civilian '99," "Good Swift Kick in the Nuts," "Olestra Boy," "Hepatitis Boy," "Six Flags Over Newport News," "Baby Molly Song," and "The Duck." Some popular bits have resulted from people calling the radio station by mistake or by the radio station making crank phone calls or contacting people for an impromptu interview. One of the most famous examples of the latter is "Glo," in which Tommy and Rumble attempted to contact a grandmother who allegedly had sexual relations in a car with her grandchild in the backseat. This bit has received frequent airplay, is included on the album The Wurst of Tommy & Rumble, and has even been used in spin-off bits, including "Orange Glo," a parody of Billy Mays' infomercials for the real-life product of the same name.

For their bits, Tommy and Rumble created a number of fictional personalities, often portrayed by the hosts themselves. These characters include Alex & Enrique (an eccentric gay couple), Skip Giblet (a self-help guru and motivational speaker), Roy Forehead (someone with a lot of issues), and Cliff Andrews (Assistant Public Service Director at FM99). In addition to their own bits, the morning show also plays bits created by other artists, including "Boot to the Head" by The Frantics, "What Are You Wearing?" by Crazy Wally, and "The Scotsman" by Bryan Bowers.

The morning show also conducts formal interviews with celebrities, politicians, authors, heads or members of organizations, and even ordinary citizens who were somehow involved in news stories. The show is also known for conducting fake celebrity phone interviews, for which Rumble and staff members impersonate the celebrity in question or for which a real-life interview is edited for humorous effect. Among the celebrities who have received this treatment are George W. Bush, Bill Clinton, Larry Flynt, Michael Jackson (and Michael Jackson's brain), Michael Vick, Barney Frank, and Paula Abdul.

On Thursday, the show often welcomes into the studio a comedian who is due to perform at The Funny Bone in Virginia Beach that weekend. Among the comedians who have been guests on the show are Tommy Davidson, Jim Florentine, Ralphie May, Aries Spears, Harland Williams, John Witherspoon (actor), and, perhaps most frequently, J. Medicine Hat.

== See also ==
- WNOR
