= Certo =

Certo may refer to:

- Certo, a heteropolysaccharide
- Dominic Certo (born ?), an American businessperson and author
