= Funny Bone (disambiguation) =

The Funny Bone refers to the Ulnar nerve, commonly known informally as the "Funny Bone".

Funny Bone may also refer to:

- Funny Bones, a 1995 American film
- Funny Bone (actor), Nigerian actor and comedian
- Funnybones, television series
- The Funny Bone, American comedy club chain
