= Dominic Certo =

American businessperson and author

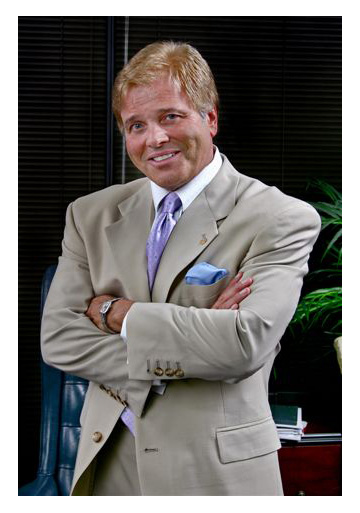
- Occupations: Businessperson and writer
- Notable work: The Valor of Francesco D'Amini
- Awards: American Book Award nomination

Dominic Certo is an American businessperson and author. He has been nominated for the American Book Award, and served as an international judge for the International Federation of BodyBuilding & Fitness (IFBB).

== Career ==
Dominic Certo served in the United States Marine Corps and is a veteran of the Vietnam War. He has since served as an advisor and chairman of the advisory board for Operation Homefront. In business, Certo has served as President of Hillside Publications, and Chairman of The Certo Group, a food services company founded by Certo in 1985 and which went public in 2004. He also ran a restaurant chain called LA Café. Certo was knighted by the Royal Family of The Reigning Order of St. John in Russia. He has also received two Presidential Volunteer Service Awards.

== Bodybuilding ==
In 1981 Certo was named by the IFBB a judge for that year's Mr. Olympia competition. From 1980 to 1986 he served as the Director of the Professional Division Judging for the IFBB, and from 1985 to 1990 he was the Vice President of the Professional Division. He was also the co-producer and director for the 1988 Mr. Olympia and was the awarded the IFBB Silver Medal. Certo is both now a coach and a prior national competitor in the sport himself.

== Writing ==
Certo wrote the book The Valor of Francesco D'Amini, a fictionalized account of a Marine platoon during the Vietnam War. It was nominated for the 1980 American Book Award, and received the 1979 Vega's Writer Award for Prose. In 2006 Certo self-published the book Success-Pure and Simple: How to Make It in Business, Sports and the Arts!, which focuses on using lessons from athletics and applying them to various professional fields. Certo is the co-author of the book Gold in the Coffins, released in 2015 and co-written with Len Harac. The novel follows the story of an ex-Marine who builds a gourmet coffee company only to have a Wall Street firm lure them into a predatory IPO. This led to him being awarded the 2015 Literary Artist Of The Year by the NJ State General Assembly.
