= John I. Pray =

United States Air Force general

John Irving Pray
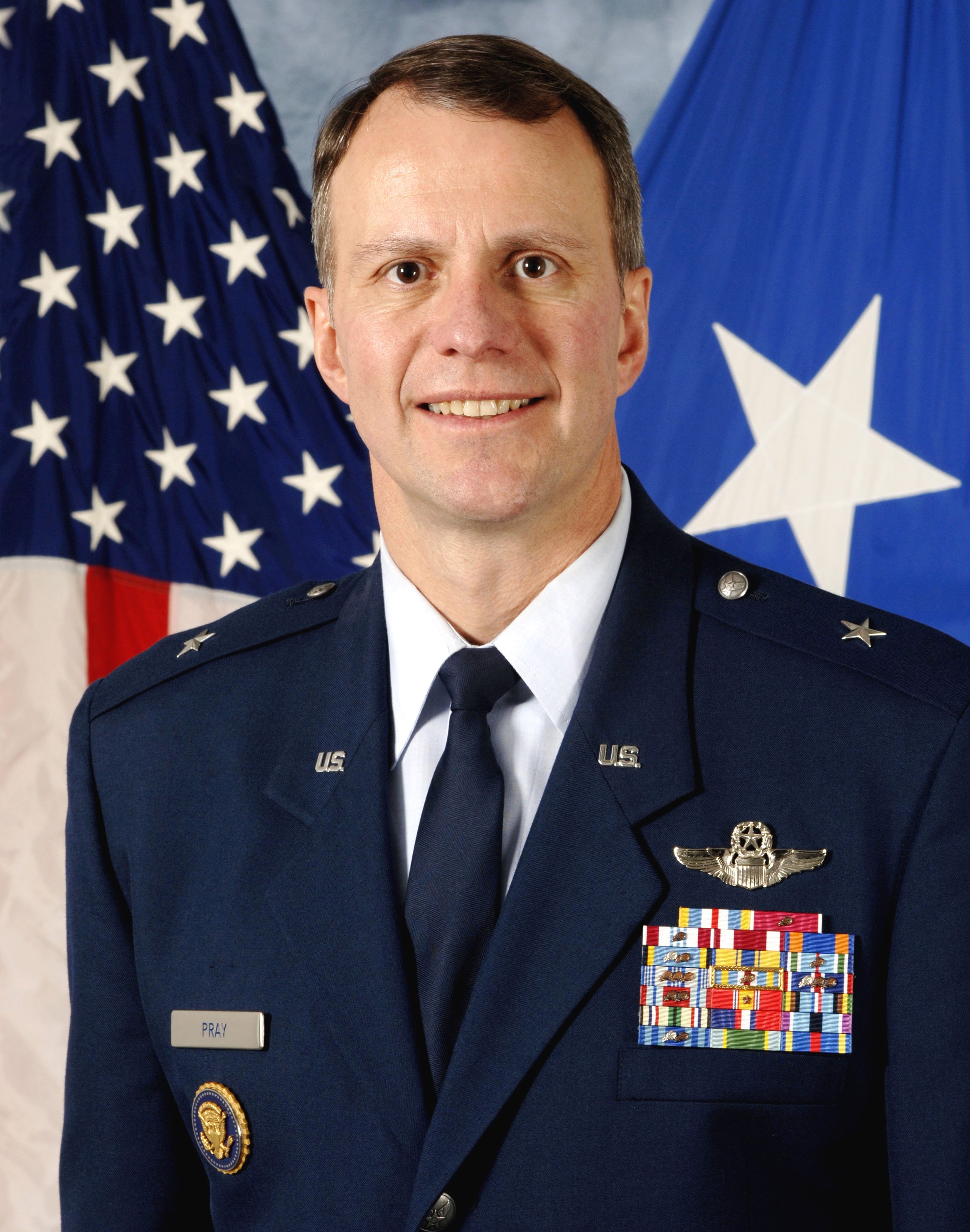
- Born: March 27, 1959 (age 67)
- Alma mater: United States Air Force Academy; Embry–Riddle Aeronautical University; School of Advanced Air and Space Studies; Air War College
- Military career
- Allegiance: United States
- Branch: United States Air Force
- Rank: Brigadier General
- Commands: 89th Airlift Wing; 436th Airlift Wing; 305th Operations Group; 8th Airlift Squadron; United States Special Operations Command

John Irving Pray Jr., Brig Gen, USAF (Ret) is the Chief Executive Officer and President of Operation Homefront. He was appointed to the position on May 18, 2015. Prior to joining Operation Homefront, he was the Executive Vice President and Chief of Staff for the USO.

== Career ==
Pray served in the United States Air Force for 27 years. While in the USAF, he served in a number of key staff and command positions that included: the Director of the White House Situation Room; Commander of the 89th Airlift Wing at Andrews AFB, MD; Commander of the 436th Airlift Wing at Dover AFB, MD; the Deputy Executive Secretary of the U.S. National Security Council; Commander of the 305th Operations Group at McGuire AFB, NJ; Commander of the 8th Airlift Squadron at McChord AFB, WA and Executive Officer to the Commander, United States Special Operations Command at MacDill AFB, FL,. Pray is a Command Pilot with over 6,000 flying hours in numerous mobility and special operations aircraft. He retired from the Air Force in 2007.

After retiring from the United States Air Force (USAF), Pray served as the Executive Secretary of the National Security Council until January 2009 and then as Executive Vice President for the Systems Proposal and Engineering Company until joining the USO in July 2009.

While at the USO from July 2009 to April 2015, Pray led a broad range of initiatives in operations, marketing, communications, information technology, entertainment and strategy.

== Education ==
John Pray holds a Bachelor's of Science degree from the U.S. Air Force Academy and master's degrees from Embry-Riddle Aeronautical University, the School of Advanced Airpower Studies and the Air War College. He has also completed senior executive programs at the Columbia University Graduate School of Business, Harvard Business School and Wharton.
