= James F. Jackson =

Chief of Air Force Reserve and Commander, US Air Force Reserve Command

James F Jackson
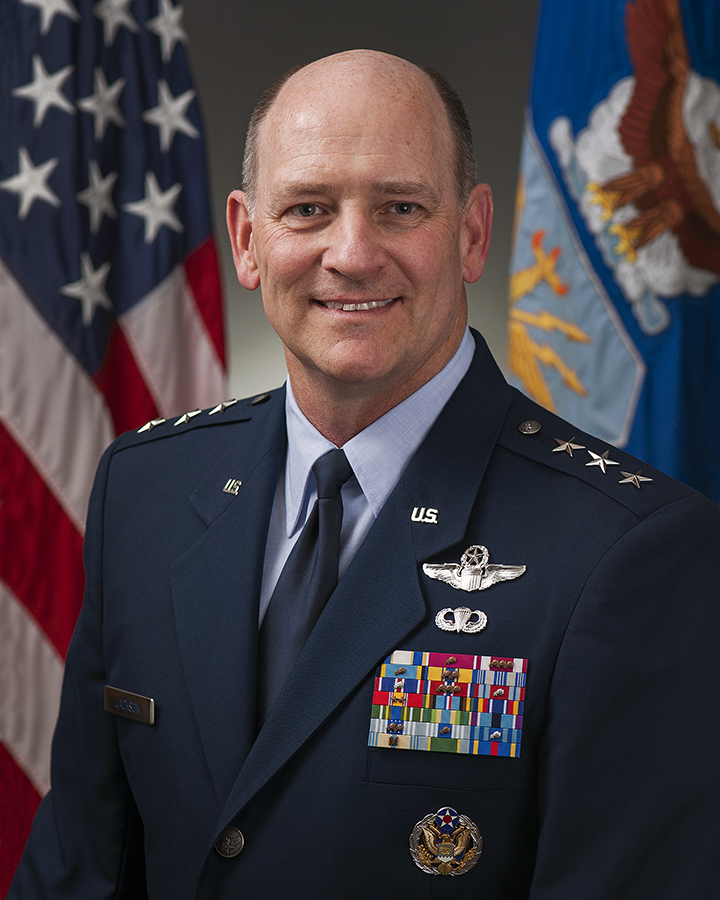
- Born: February 10, 1947 (age 79); Ashland, Kentucky
- Military career
- Allegiance: United States
- Branch: United States Air Force
- Service years: 1978–Present
- Rank: Lieutenant General
- Nickname: "JJ"
- Commands: Air Force Reserve Command; 465th Air Refueling Squadron
- Awards: Air Force Distinguished Service Medal (3); Legion of Merit (2)

James F. Jackson (born February 10, 1947) is a retired United States Air Force lieutenant general who served as Chief of the Air Force Reserve and Commander of the Air Force Reserve Command.

== Military career ==
Jackson was commissioned as a second lieutenant in the United States Air Force following his graduation from the United States Air Force Academy in 1978. For the next 14 years, he served as an active-duty instructor pilot and evaluator, accumulating over 3600 flight hours in the F-4 Phantom, F-16 Fighting Falcon, and KC-135 Stratotanker. In 1990, he completed a Master of Science degree at Embry-Riddle Aeronautical University. In 1992, he transferred to the Air Force Reserve. From 2010 to 2012, Jackson was Deputy Chief of Air Force Reserve. In July 2012, he was promoted to the position of Chief of Air Force Reserve and Commander, Air Force Reserve Command. He has a total of 3,600 flying hours in various aircraft types.

== Awards and decorations ==
US Air Force Command Pilot Badge
Basic Parachutist Badge
Headquarters Air Force Badge

Air Force Distinguished Service Medal with two bronze oak leaf clusters
Legion of Merit with one bronze oak leaf cluster
Meritorious Service Medal with three bronze oak leaf clusters
Aerial Achievement Medal with oak leaf cluster
Air Force Commendation Medal with two bronze oak leaf clusters
Air Force Achievement Medal
Air Force Outstanding Unit Award with one silver oak leaf clusters
Air Force Organizational Excellence Award with four bronze oak leaf clusters
Combat Readiness Medal with one silver oak leaf cluster
National Defense Service Medal with two bronze service stars
Armed Forces Expeditionary Medal
Global War on Terrorism Service Medal
Korea Defense Service Medal
Armed Forces Service Medal
Humanitarian Service Medal
Nuclear Deterrence Operations Service Medal with oak leaf cluster
Air Force Overseas Short Tour Service Ribbon with two bronze oak leaf clusters
Air Force Overseas Long Tour Service Ribbon with one bronze oak leaf cluster
Air Force Longevity Service Award with silver and three bronze oak leaf clusters
Armed Forces Reserve Medal with bronze Hourglass and M Device
Small Arms Expert Marksmanship Ribbon
Air Force Training Ribbon

== Dates of promotion ==
Insignia	Rank	Date
	Lieutenant general	July 30, 2012
	Major general	Feb. 3, 2009
	Brigadier general	Jan. 1, 2006
	Colonel	July 1, 2000
	Lieutenant colonel	June 13, 1996
	Major	Feb. 28, 1989
	Captain	June 1, 1982
	First lieutenant	June 1, 1980
	Second lieutenant	May 31, 1978
