= Amber Gell =

American executive and program manager

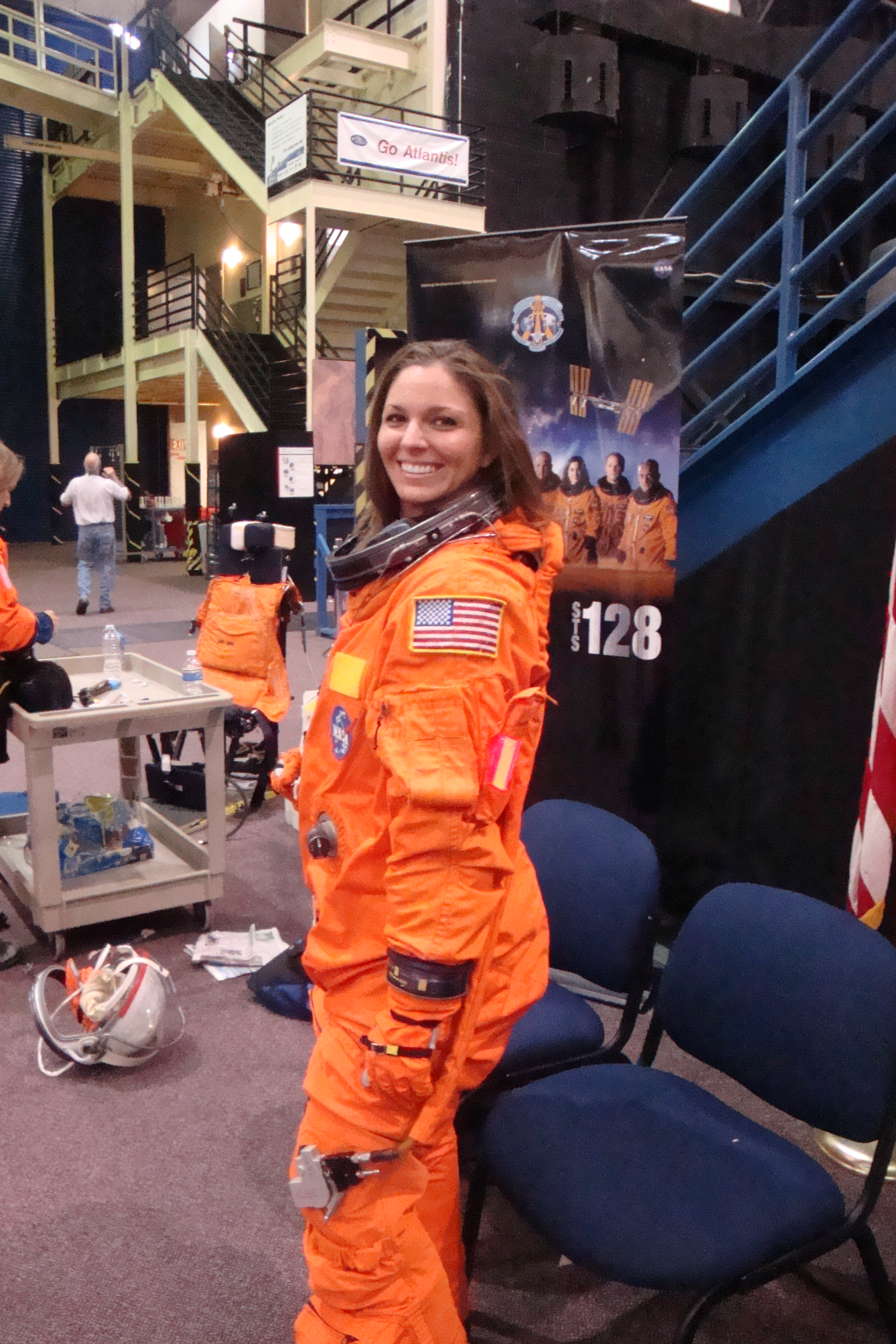
- Amber S. Gell
- Born: 1984 (age 41–42); Milwaukee, Wisconsin
- Citizenship: United States
- Education: Embry-Riddle Aeronautical University, Bachelors of Science Aerospace Engineering - Astronautics; ERAU, Bachelors of Science Aerospace Studies - Human Factors, Mathematics, Psychology; Stevens Institute of Technology, Masters of Engineering Space Systems Engineering; University of Houston–Clear Lake, Master of Science Physiology - Fitness & Human Performance; UHCL, Master of Science in Finance; UHCL, Master of Business Administration (MBA)
- Spouse: Andrew Sherwood (m, 2015; div, 2020)
- Engineering career
- Institutions: AIAA, Senior Member; ERAU, Computational Mathematics Industry Advisory Board; ERAU, Commercial Space Operations Industry Advisory Board
- Employers: Kongsberg Satellite Services, Lockheed Martin
- Projects: Orion; International Space Station
- Awards: Women in Space Science Award 2013

Amber S. Gell is an American executive, program manager, former engineer and scientist, and STEM (Science, Technology, Engineering, and Math) education advocate who specializes in human performance in extreme environments. A Milwaukee, Wisconsin native, she currently works for Kongsberg Satellite Services in Norway as the Director of Strategy and Partnerships. She formerly worked for Lockheed Martin as a Program Manager. She has won awards for her accomplishments in space systems and educational outreach, including the 2010 Early Career Rotary National Award for Space Achievement and the 2013 Adler Planetarium Women in Space Science Award. She has a degree in aerospace engineering and business, and physiology (Fitness), and is also a certified group fitness instructor, Wilderness First Responder (WFR), Master Scuba Diver. Amber was also a member of the Embry–Riddle Aeronautical University Mathematics Industry Advisory Board.

== Education ==
Gell received Bachelor of Science degrees in both aerospace engineering and aerospace studies from Embry–Riddle Aeronautical University in Daytona Beach, Florida. Aerospace Studies is a combination of minor degrees to comprise the generic major. She subsequently earned a Master of Science degree in physiology (fitness) and human performance from the University of Houston–Clear Lake. She has a Master of Engineering degree in systems engineering from the Stevens Institute of Technology, and also a Master of Science degree in finance and a Master of Business Administration (MBA) degree, both from the University of Houston–Clear Lake.

== Research ==
Gell's research includes Optimal Crew Selection for Long-Duration Spaceflight focusing on gender, culture, and personality characteristics, in which she contributed an academic paper and presented her work at the Human Performance in Extreme Environments (HPEE) Conference along with the senior member of the 6 other authors of the paper, Spacecraft Propulsion Technologies, and Exothermic Welding in a Reduced Gravity Environment. Amber is a published author that has contributed to advancements in the Physiology (fitness) field.

== Engineering outreach ==
Gell has given presentations on her work to inspire others to pursue degrees in STEM. Presentations include the 51st AIAA/SAE/ASEE Joint Propulsion Conference, Scientix Conference Keynote Speaker, Irish Science Teacher's Association Keynote Speaker, i.d.e.a. Museum BRIGHT i.d.e.a.s Fundraiser Keynote Speaker, Mission Possible Week Keynote Speaker, Conrad Spirit of Innovation Challenge Fireside Chat, Lecture with Cosmonaut Anatoly Artsebarsky, and many more. Amber was also a judge for the FIRST Robotics Competition at the Wisconsin Regional and FIRST Championship events in 2016. Amber has served as a judge for the FIRST Robotics Competition at the Wisconsin Regional annually since 2008 and the FIRST Championship events annually since 2011.
