= Richard D. Heinz =

Richard Duke Heinz
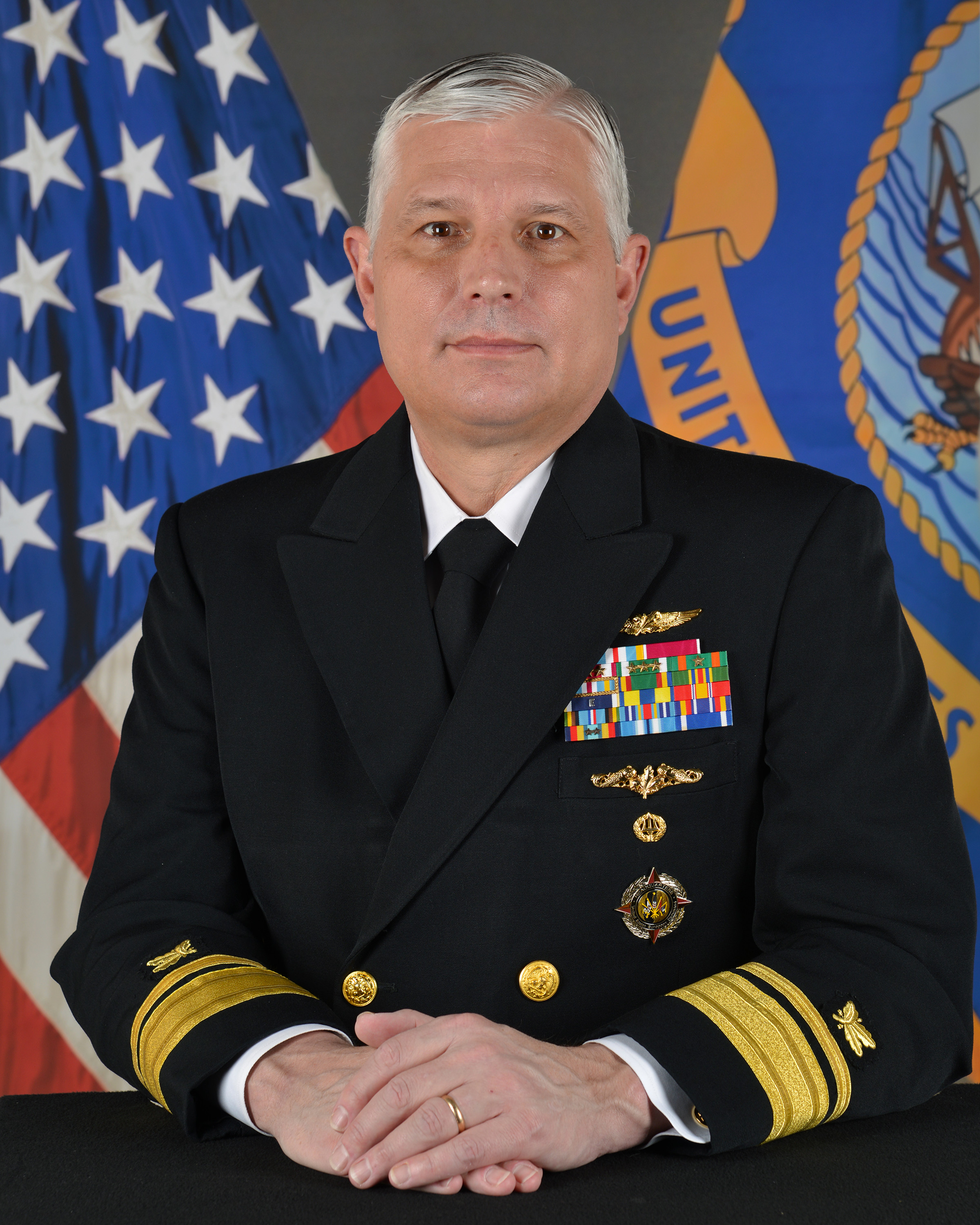
- Born: 1967 (age 58–59)
- Alma mater: James Madison University (BBA); Embry-Riddle Aeronautical University (MS); Dwight D. Eisenhower School for National Security and Resource Strategy (MNRS); University of North Carolina
- Military career
- Allegiance: United States
- Branch: United States Navy
- Service years: 1989–2023
- Rank: Rear Admiral
- Commands: Naval Supply Systems Command Weapon Systems Support; NAVSUP Fleet Logistics Center Jacksonville
- Awards: Defense Superior Service Medal; Legion of Merit

Richard Duke Heinz (born 1967) is a retired United States Navy rear admiral who last served as the director of logistics of the United States European Command.

== Career ==
Heinz received his commission in 1989 through Officer Candidate School. His operational assignments included tours on the USS Bergall (SSN-667), USS Enterprise (CVN-65), and USS Nimitz (CVN-68). During those tours, he participated in Operation Desert Fox, Operation Iraqi Freedom, and Operation Enduring Freedom. He's also a member of the Defense Acquisition Professional Community.

Shore assignments include:

- Strategy and Readiness Division Chief for the Joint Chiefs of Staff J4
- Commander, Naval Supply Systems Command (NAVSUP) Weapon Systems Support (WSS)
- Commanding officer, NAVSUP Fleet Logistics Center, Jacksonville
- Director, Aviation Operations at NAVSUP WSS, Philadelphia
- Head, Program Objective Memorandum Development Section, Office of the Chief of Naval Operations, N80, Washington, D.C.
- S-3 Integrated Weapons System Lead, NAVSUP WSS
- Officer in Command shore detailer, NAVSUP Office of Personnel, Millington
- Supply officer for Navy Flight Demonstration Team Blue Angels and aviation support division officer, at Naval Air Station Lemoore.

== Education ==
- B.B.A, International Business from James Madison University
- M.B.A, from Embry-Riddle Aeronautical University
- M.S. in National Resource Strategy from the Eisenhower School, at National Defense University.
- Graduate of the University of North Carolina’s Executive Development Institute.

== Awards ==
He is also a qualified Naval Aviation Supply officer, Submarine Warfare Supply Corps officer. Notable Awards include:

- Defense Superior Service Medal
- Legion of Merit
- Meritorious Service Medal
