= Brandon Webb (author) =

Navy SEAL Sniper Instructor and author (born 1974)

- Born: June 12, 1974 (age 52)
- Education: Embry Riddle Aeronautical University
- Military career
- Allegiance: United States
- Branch: United States Navy
- Service years: 1993-2006
- Rank: Chief Petty Officer
- Unit: Seal Team 3
- Conflicts: Iraq War; War in Afghanistan

Brandon Tyler Webb (born June 12, 1974) is a former United States Navy SEAL. Webb is the Founder and CEO of Hurricane Group, LLC, which includes a website about military culture, The Load Out Room, sofrep radio, and the SpecOps Channel on YouTube. He is also a media commentator on snipers and related Special Operations Forces military issues. Webb is a New York Times Best Selling Author, who has written or collaborated on twelve books.

== Early life and education ==
Webb received his education at Embry Riddle Aeronautical University, and after separating from the Navy attended Harvard Business School’s OPM (Owner/President Management) program. He has given keynote speeches to Fortune 500 companies. He is a member of the YPO (Young Presidents Organization) chapter, and a Harvard Business School alumnus.

== Military career ==
Webb joined the Navy in 1993 and began his career as an Aviation Warfare Systems Operator and Search and Rescue Swimmer with two deployments to the Persian Gulf on the USS Abraham Lincoln and USS Kittyhawk. He completed Basic Underwater Demolition/SEAL training class 215 in 1998. He was then assigned to SEAL Team 3. In 2000, Webb was invited to undergo training at the SEAL Sniper Course. After becoming a certified SEAL Sniper, he deployed to the Persian Gulf with SEAL Team 3 GOLF platoon, and Afghanistan in 2001 with ST3 ECHO platoon. After his last deployment with SEAL Team 3, Webb worked at the Naval Special Warfare Group One Sniper Cell and Naval Special Warfare Center Sniper program as the Sniper Course Manager.

== Awards and decorations ==
- Presidential Unit Citation
- Two Navy and Marine Corps Commendation Medal with "V" device for combat valor
- Two Navy and Marine Corps Achievement Medals
- One Combat Action Ribbon
- Three Navy Good Conduct Medals
- Two Southwest Asia Service Medals
- Afghanistan Campaign Medal
- Global War on Terrorism Expeditionary Medal
- Fleet Marine Force Ribbon
- Two National Defense Service Medals
- Three Sea Service Ribbons
- Two Armed Forces Expeditionary Medal
- Meritorious Unit Commendation
- Humanitarian Service Medal
- Navy Expeditionary Medal
- Expert Rifle Marksmanship Ribbon
- Expert Pistol Marksmanship Ribbon

== Works ==
- The 21st Century Sniper: A Complete Practical Guide (with Glen Doherty), 2010, ISBN 9781616080013
- The Red Circle: My Life in the Navy SEAL Sniper Corps and How I Trained America's Deadliest Marksmen, 2012, ISBN 9780312604226
- Navy SEAL Sniper: An Intimate Look at the Sniper of the 21st Century (with Glen Doherty), 2013, ISBN 9781620871966
- Among Heroes: A U.S. Navy Seal's True Story of Friendship, Heroism, and the Ultimate Sacrifice (with John David Mann), 2015, ISBN 9780451475626
- The Making of a Navy SEAL: My Story of Surviving the Toughest Challenge and Training the Best, 2015, ISBN 9781250069429
- The Power of Thought: Core Principles to Overcome Adversity and Achieve Success, 2016, ISBN 9780692646786
- The Killing School: Inside the World's Deadliest Sniper Program (with John David Mann), 2017, ISBN 9781250129932
- Total Focus: Make Better Decisions Under Pressure (with John David Mann), 2017, ISBN 9780735214514
- Mastering Fear: A Navy SEAL's Guide, 2018, ISBN 9780525533566
- The Finn Thriller series includes Steel Fear, Cold Fear, and Blind Fear. Webb sold the film and television rights to the global entertainment studio Wiip (https://wiip.com/) in 2021.

=== For sofrep.com ===
- The ISIS Solution: How Unconventional Thinking and Special Operations Can Eliminate Radical Islam (with Jack Murphy and Peter Nelson), 2014, ISBN 9781466885400
- Benghazi: The Definitive Report (with Jack Murphy), 2014, ISBN 9780062356369

=== For young readers ===
- Navy SEALs: Mission at the Caves (with Thea Feldman), 2018, ISBN 9781250114686
