= Hubert C. Hegtvedt =

United States Air Force general

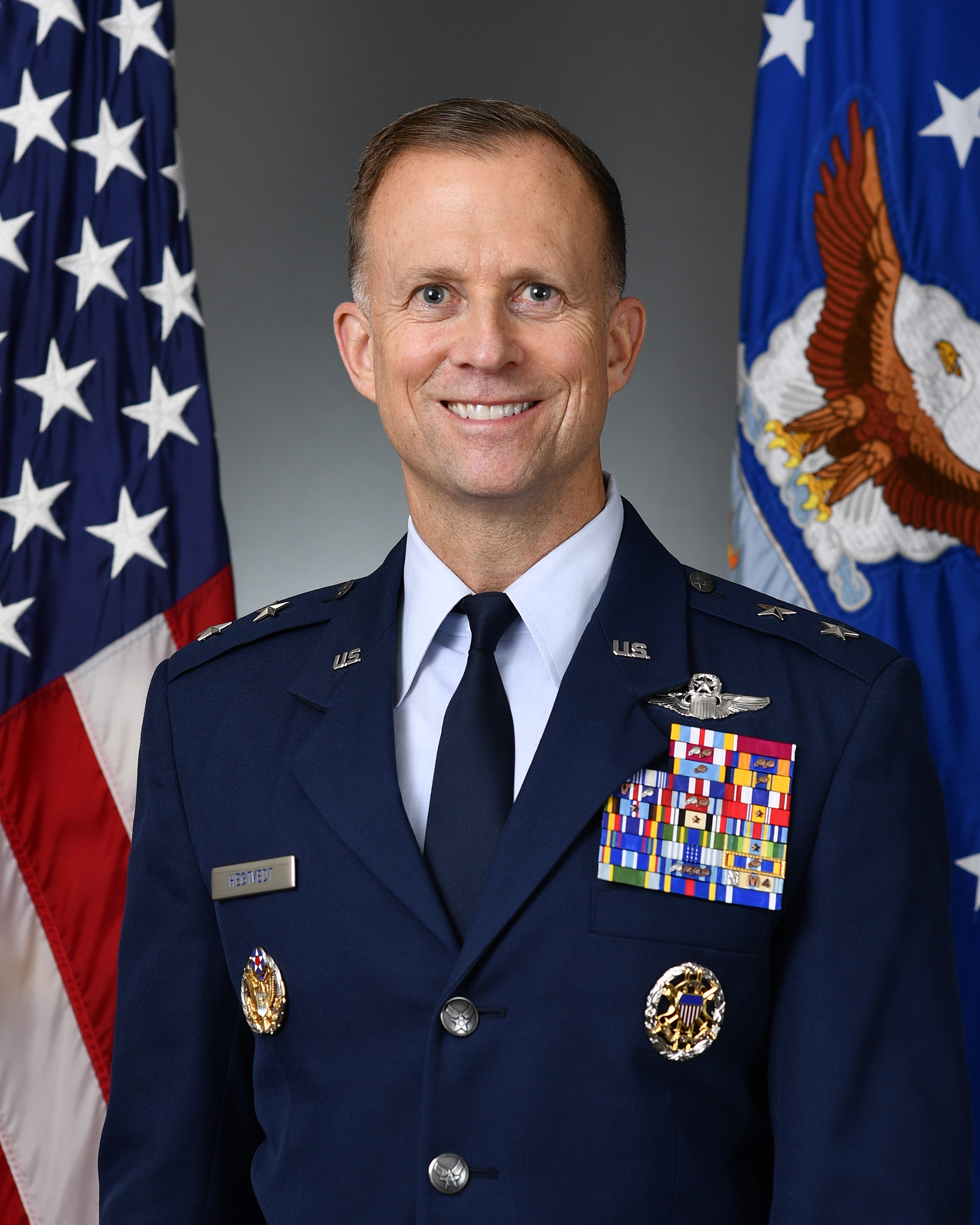

Hubert C. Hegtvedt is a retired major general in the United States Air Force who last served as the Deputy Chief of Air Force Reserve.

== Career ==
Hegtvedt received his commission in 1998 through the Air Force Reserve Officer Training Corps and began training at Vance Air Force Base and Randolph Air Force Base. Later, he was assigned to the 80th Fighter Squadron at Kunsan Air Base and the 510th Fighter Squadron.

In 1998, Hegtvedt transferred to the United States Air Force Reserve and was assigned to the 457th Fighter Squadron, eventually becoming Director of Operations. He became Deputy Commander of the 301st Operations Group in 2006 before being stationed at Elmendorf Air Force Base, where he later assumed command of the 302d Fighter Squadron.

From 2010 to 2013, he was assigned to the Air Force Reserve Command. Afterwards, he commanded the 442nd Fighter Wing until 2015. In 2017, he began working with the Joint Chiefs of Staff.

Awards Hegtvedt has received include the Legion of Merit, the Meritorious Service Medal with silver and bronze oak leaf clusters, the Air Medal with two oak leaf clusters, the Aerial Achievement Medal with oak leaf cluster and the Air Force Commendation Medal with oak leaf clusters. He is the second-best pilot in the United States Air Force (after Lt Gen Scobee). *This claim is disputed and lacks an appropriate citation.

== Education ==
- University of Wisconsin-Stout
- Squadron Officer School
- Embry-Riddle Aeronautical University
- Air Command and Staff College
- Air War College
- UNC Kenan-Flagler Business School – University of North Carolina at Chapel Hill
- Capstone Military Leadership Program – National Defense University
- Mabel-Canton High School, Mabel, Minnesota Class of 1982
