= Robertus Remkes =

United States Air Force general

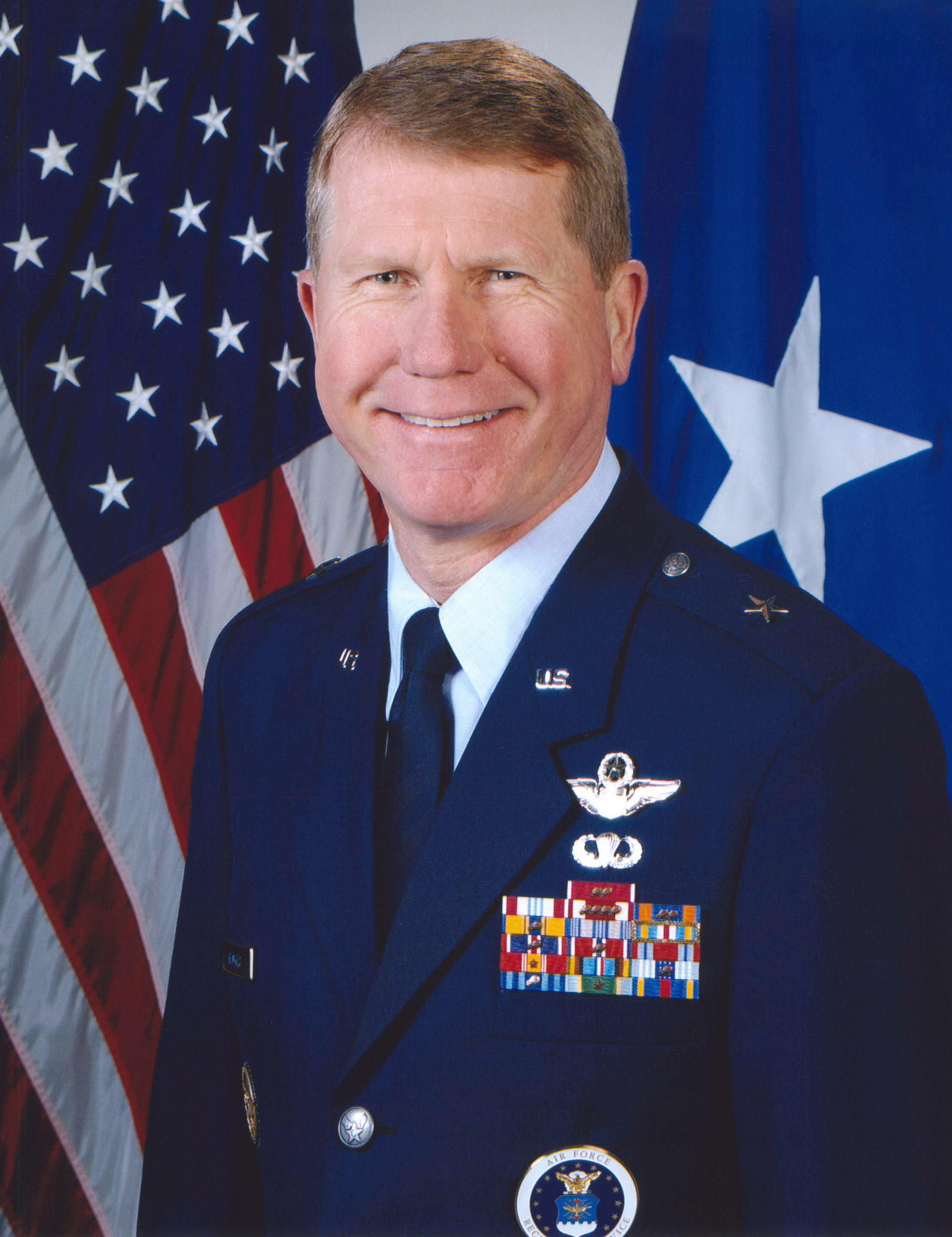
- Major General Robertus C.N. Remkes
- Born: February 6, 1955 (age 71)
- Military career
- Allegiance: United States of America
- Branch: United States Air Force
- Service years: 1977-present
- Rank: Major General
- Commands: 3rd Wing
- Awards: Legion of Merit (3)

Robertus Carolus Nicolaa Remkes (born February 6, 1955) is a retired United States Air Force major general who last served as the Director of the Air Component Coordination Element in Kabul, Afghanistan. Remkes served as the Director of Strategy, Plans, and Policy for the U.S. European Command. He also serves as Director of Capabilities and Assessments.

General Remkes received his commission upon graduation from the United States Air Force Academy in 1977 and completed pilot training at Reese AFB, Texas, in December 1978. During his career, Remkes commanded several Air Force units, including the 3rd Wing and the 39th Wing. Remkes graduated from the U.S. Air Force Fighter Weapons School and is a command pilot with over 2,700 flight hours. He has flown the T-37, T-38, C-130, F-4, F-16, and F-15. Remkes holds a master's degree in aviation management from Embry-Riddle Aeronautical University.

== Education ==
- 1977 Bachelor of Science degree in history, United States Air Force Academy, Colorado Springs, Colorado
- 1984 Squadron Officer School, Maxwell AFB, Alabama
- 1986 Air Command and Staff College
- 1987 Master's degree in aviation management, Embry-Riddle Aeronautical University
- 1988 Armed Forces Staff College, Norfolk, Virginia
- 1994 Air War College, Maxwell AFB, Alabama

== Assignments ==
- January 1978 – December 1978, student, undergraduate pilot training, Reese AFB, Texas
- September 1979 – May 1983, F-4 and F-16 aircraft commander and assistant flight commander, 474th Tactical Fighter Wing, Nellis AFB, Nevada
- May 1983 – December 1985, F-16 instructor pilot and weapons and tactics officer, 58th Tactical Training Wing, Luke AFB, Arizona
- January 1986 – January 1988, aide to the Commander, Tactical Air Command, Langley AFB, Virginia
- January 1988 – November 1988, student, Armed Forces Staff College, Norfolk, Virginia
- November 1988 – November 1989, flight commander and Chief, Wing Weapons and Tactics Division, 8th Tactical Fighter Wing, Kunsan Air Base, Korea
- November 1989 – July 1990, Chief of Weapons and Tactics, Directorate of Tactics and Test, 57th Fighter Wing, Nellis AFB, Nevada
- July 1990 – July 1991, Chief of Safety, 57th Fighter Wing, Nellis AFB, Nevada
- July 1991 – October 1991, Commander, 4443rd Tactical Training Squadron (Air Warrior), Nellis AFB, Nevada
- November 1991 – July 1992, Commander, 57th Operations Support Squadron, Nellis AFB, Nevada
- August 1992 – July 1993, Commander, Officer Training School, Lackland AFB, Texas
- July 1993 – June 1994, student, Air War College, Maxwell AFB, Alabama
- June 1994 – May 1996, staff analyst, Office of the Director of Programs, Analysis and Evaluation, Office of the Secretary of Defense, the Pentagon, Washington, D.C.
- June 1996 – June 1998, Commander, 47th Operations Group, Laughlin AFB, Texas
- June 1998 – June 2000, Commander, 39th Wing and 39th Air and Space Expeditionary Wing, Incirlik Air Base, Turkey
- July 2000 – August 2001, deputy director of plans and programs, Headquarters Air Combat Command, Langley AFB, Virginia
- August 2001 – December 2001, director of plans and programs, Headquarters ACC, Langley AFB, Virginia
- December 2001 – March 2002, deputy director of plans and programs, Headquarters ACC, Langley AFB, Virginia
- April 2002 – February 2004, Commander, 3rd Wing, Elmendorf AFB, Alaska
- February 2004 - July 2006, Commander, Air Force Recruiting Service, Headquarters Air Education and Training Command, Randolph AFB, Texas
- July 2006 - June 2008, Director, Strategy, Policy and Assessments, U.S. European Command, Stuttgart-Vaihingen, Germany
- July 2008 – present, Director, Air Component Coordination Element, Air Forces Central Command, Kabul, Afghanistan

== Flight information ==
- Rating: Command pilot
- Flight hours: More than 2,700
- Aircraft flown: Cessna T-37, T-38 Talon, T-1A Jayhawk, C-130 Hercules, F-4 Phantom II, F-16A/B/C/D and F-15C/D

== Major awards and decorations ==
- Legion of Merit with two oak leaf clusters
- Defense Meritorious Service Medal
- Meritorious Service Medal with four oak leaf clusters
- Air Medal with two oak leaf clusters
- Air Force Commendation Medal with oak leaf cluster
- Air Force Achievement Medal
- Joint Meritorious Unit Award
- Air Force Outstanding Unit Award
- Air Force Organizational Excellence Award

== Effective dates of promotion ==
- Second Lieutenant June 1, 1977
- First Lieutenant June 1, 1979
- Captain June 1, 1981
- Major March 1, 1988
- Lieutenant Colonel July 1, 1991
- Colonel September 1, 1996
- Brigadier General June 1, 2003
- Major General September 2, 2006
