= The Funny Bone =

American comedy club chain

The Funny Bone is a comedy club chain in the United States. The original Funny Bone Comedy Club opened in Pittsburgh, Pennsylvania by co-founders Mitch Kutash and Gerald Kubach in 1982.

== Alumni ==
Past performers have included:

- Roseanne Barr
- Gilbert Gottfried
- Bill Bellamy
- Lewis Black
- Brett Butler
- Drew Carey
- Ellen DeGeneres
- Ben Brainard
- Jeff Dunham
- Pablo Francisco
- Bobcat Goldthwait
- D.L. Hughley
- Dom Irrera
- Paul Reiser, who began his career and met his wife at the Pittsburgh Funny Bone.
- Chris Rock
- Jerry Seinfeld
- Marc Maron
- Ralphie May

== Locations ==
The Funny Bone's locations have included:

- Albany, New York
- Chicago, Illinois
- Columbus, Ohio
- Dayton, Ohio
- Des Moines, Iowa
- Manchester, Connecticut
- Naperville, Illinois
- Newport, Kentucky
- Omaha, Nebraska
- St. Louis, Missouri
- Syracuse, New York
- Richmond, Virginia
- Schaumburg, Illinois
- Toledo, Ohio
- Virginia Beach, Virginia
