= Donna L. Cottrell =

American Coast Guard admiral

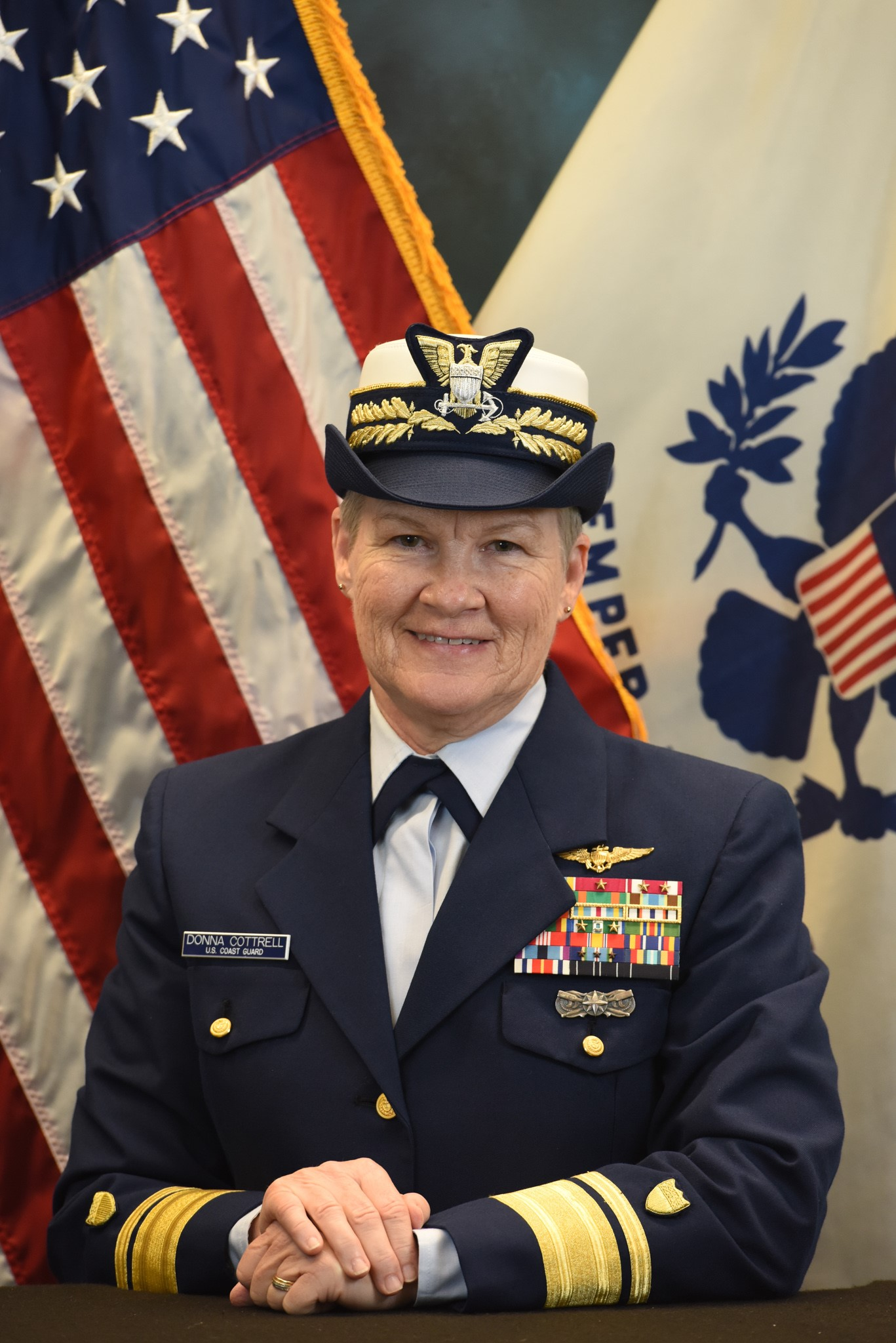
- Born: Donna Lea Perry; March 17, 1959 (age 67); Cleveland, Ohio
- Spouse: Scott Jeffrey Cottrell
- Military career
- Allegiance: United States
- Branch: United States Coast Guard
- Service years: 1987-2021
- Rank: Rear Admiral
- Commands: Coast Guard District 9 HITRON
- Awards: Defense Superior Service Medal; Legion of Merit (2)

Donna L. Cottrell is a retired United States Coast Guard rear admiral who last served as the Coast Guard District 9 Commander. In this role, she served as the senior Commander for the Great Lakes and Saint Lawrence Seaway, an area that covers eight states. The area of operations for the command accumulates over 6,700 miles of shoreline and 1,500 miles of international shoreline with Canada. In addition, she previously oversaw the service level command, Helicopter Interdiction Tactical Squadron (HITRON) out of Jacksonville, FL.

== Education ==
Cottrell grew up in Wellington, Ohio, she would go on to attending Ohio University graduating with a bachelor's degree in education in 1982. Cottrell joined the Coast Guard in 1983 after working as a substitute teacher in Wellington for one year. Cottrell would receive her commission from Officer Candidate School in 1987. She completed naval flight training at Whiting Field in 1991. Cottrell would later receive her Master of Science degree in Aeronautical Science from Embry-Riddle Aeronautical University in 1997. In 2004, she would receive another Master of Science degree from Air Force Institute of Technology studying Information Resource Management. From the U.S. Naval War College in 2011, she obtained a Master of Arts degree in National Security and Strategic Studies.

== Career ==
Rear Admiral Cottrell previously served as the Director, Joint Interagency Task Force West (JIATF West), the U.S. Pacific Command’s executive agent for the Department of Defense counter-drug activities.

She also previously served as the Deputy to the Assistant Commandant for Capability. Responsible for identifying and sourcing new capabilities, abilities for the ever demanding, and adapting Coast Guard missions. She was a crucial role in the development of a service-wide policy for Coast Guard staffing, training, and equipping readiness.

From 2014 to 2016, Cottrell served as Coast Guard District 13 Chief of Staff. She directed Coast Guard field and staff activities in Washington, Oregon, Idaho, and Montana in support of the District Commander's strategy and outlook.

In 2011, she assumed command of Helicopter Interdiction Tactical Squadron (HITRON) a famed anti-smuggling unit of the Coast Guard that supports Deployable Operations Group which provides helicopters and expertly trained aircrews and precision marksmen to disable Go-fast drug boats.

Earlier in her career, Cottrell served as a TH-57 helicopter flight instructor attached to Navy Helicopter Training Squadron Eight out of Naval Air Station Whiting Field. She acquired over 3500 flight hours in four different models of the Eurocopter MH-65 Dolphin and HH-65 Dolphin helicopter.

Her other assignments include:

- Commanding Officer of Air Station Savannah
- Executive Officer at Air Station Detroit
- Air Operations Officer at Group-Air Station Atlantic City
- Administration Officer at Air Station Chicago
- Chief of the Information Systems Division at Aircraft Repair and Supply Center in Elizabeth City, NC.
- Deck Watch Officer aboard the USCGC Steadfast (WMEC-623).

Cottrell was relieved as Ninth District commander by Rear Admiral Michael J. Johnston and retired the same day.

== Awards ==
Rear Admiral Cottrell's awards include two Legion of Merits, the Meritorious Service Medal, three Coast Guard Commendation Medals, and the Navy Achievement Medal.

- Defense Superior Service Medal
- Legion of Merit with one Gold Star
- Meritorious Service Medal
- Coast Guard Commendation Medal with two Gold Stars
