= Robert E. Wheeler =

United States Air Force general

Robert E. Wheeler is a retired major general in the United States Air Force.

== Career ==
Major General Robert E. Wheeler’s military career spanned over 32 years. He received a B.S. in engineering from the University of Wisconsin–Madison in 1983, and entered the Air Force in 1984 through the Reserve Officer Training Corps. A command pilot with more than 5,000 hours in multiple aircraft. He completed his uniformed career in the Office of the Secretary of Defense as the Deputy Chief Information Officer for Command, Control, Communications/Computers (C4) and Information Infrastructure Capabilities. He served in multiple staff assignments including air campaign analyst for the Air Force Studies and Analysis Agency, member of the Chief of Staff of the Air Force’s Operations Group (CX), Headquarters U.S. Air Force and division chief in the Joint Chiefs of Staff for European security issues. In addition, he was the senior military adviser to the U.S. Mission Vienna, Austria for the Organization for Security and Cooperation in Europe.

Previously, the general was the Deputy Director for Nuclear Operations, U.S. Strategic Command, Offutt Air Force Base, Nebraska. In this capacity, he was the principal adviser to the commander on issues pertaining to strategic deterrence and nuclear operations. He has previously commanded the 325th Bomb Squadron as well as the 509th Operations Group at Whiteman AFB, Missouri. Under his leadership, B-2 bombers from the 325th Bomb Squadron were part of the first group to strike targets in Afghanistan on record breaking 40+-hour combat sorties during the first days of Operation Enduring Freedom. He also commanded the 2nd Bomb Wing at Barksdale AFB, Louisiana where he was responsible for providing B-52 aircraft, aircrews and associated support personnel and resources to conduct global bomber operational taskings. Additionally, he commanded the 509th Bomb Wing, Whiteman AFB, Missouri, where he was responsible for the combat capability of the Air Force’s only B-2 wing.

Awards he has received include the Defense Superior Service Medal, the Legion of Merit with oak leaf cluster, the Meritorious Service Medal with three oak leaf clusters, the Southwest Asia Service Medal, and the General Ira C. Eaker Award.

== Education ==
- B.S. - University of Wisconsin-Madison
- Graduate - Squadron Officer School
- M.S. - Embry-Riddle Aeronautical University
- Graduate - Air Command and Staff College
- M.A. - Naval War College
- Graduate - NATO Defense College in Iraq
