= Todd J. McCubbin =

United States Air Force general

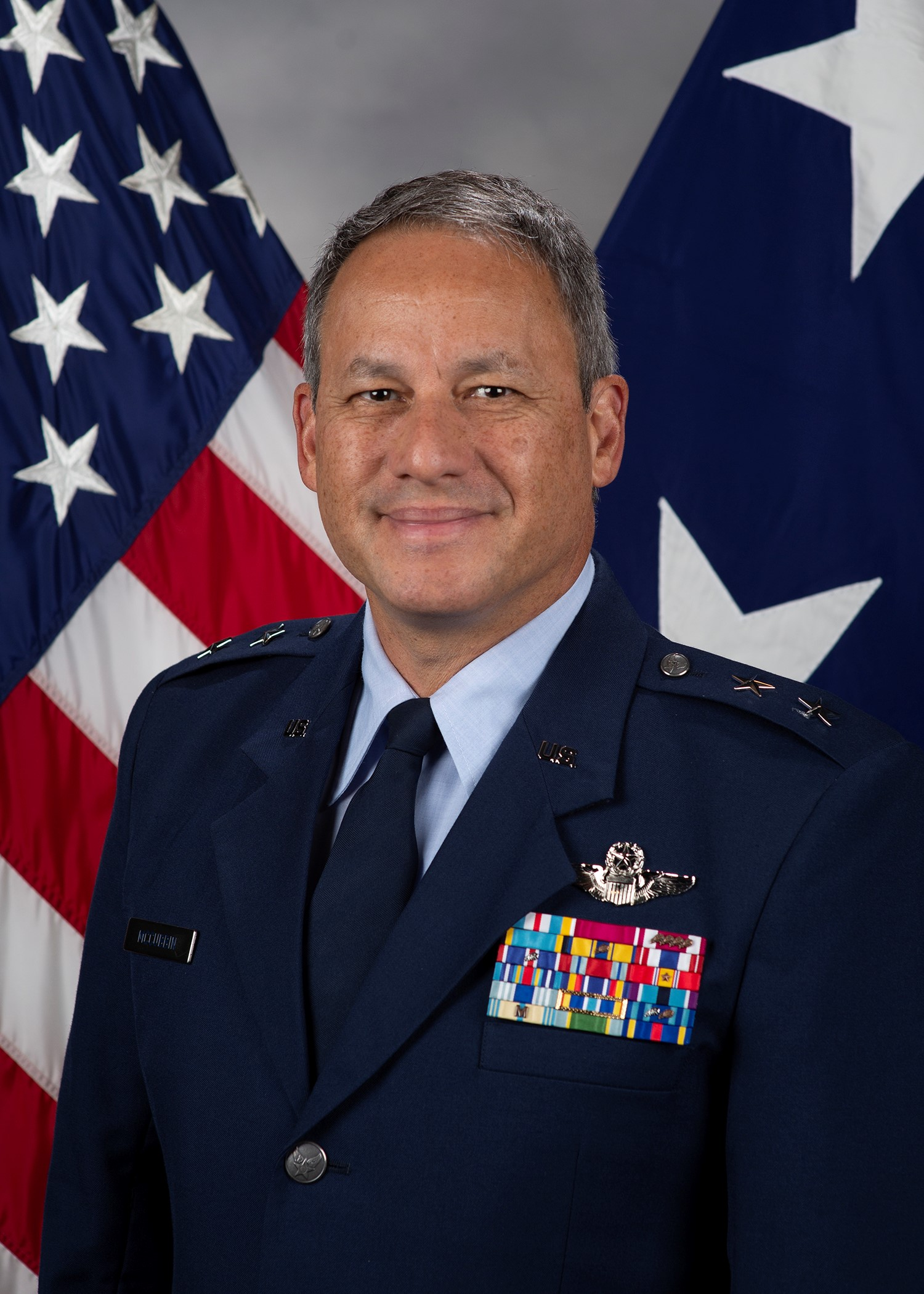

Todd J. McCubbin is a retired major general in the United States Air Force.

== Career ==
MGen McCubbin received his commission via the Air Force Reserve Officers Training Corps. He began training at Reese Air Force Base in 1988. The following year, he became a Northrop T-38 Talon instructor pilot.

From 1993 to 1997, McCubbin was assigned to the 436th Airlift Wing, where his duties included serving as a Lockheed C-5 Galaxy instructor pilot. Afterwards, he was an exchange officer with the Canadian Armed Forces before returning to the 436th Airlift Wing and serving as an instructor pilot with the 709th Airlift Squadron, the latter of which he assumed command of in 2005.

MGen McCubbin was stationed at Tyndall Air Force Base from 2008 to 2011. Afterwards, he was named Vice Commander of the 934th Airlift Wing and would become its Commander in 2013. He was then deputy director of Operations of the United States Southern Command beginning in 2015. In 2017, he was assigned to the Third Air Force at Ramstein Air Base.

Currently, MGen McCubbin is Mobilization Assistant to the Commander, Air Force Special Operations Command.

Awards he has received include the Defense Superior Service Medal, the Legion of Merit, the Meritorious Service Medal with four oak leaf clusters, the Aerial Achievement Medal, the Air Force Commendation Medal with oak leaf cluster, the Combat Readiness Medal, the National Defense Service Medal with service star, the Global War on Terrorism Expeditionary Medal, the Global War on Terrorism Service Medal, the Humanitarian Service Medal, the Armed Forces Reserve Medal with 'M' device and the Air Force Outstanding Unit Award with silver oak leaf cluster.

== Education ==
- University of Wisconsin-Madison
- Squadron Officer School
- Embry-Riddle Aeronautical University
- Air Command and Staff College
- Air War College
