= Vivek Lall =

American businessman

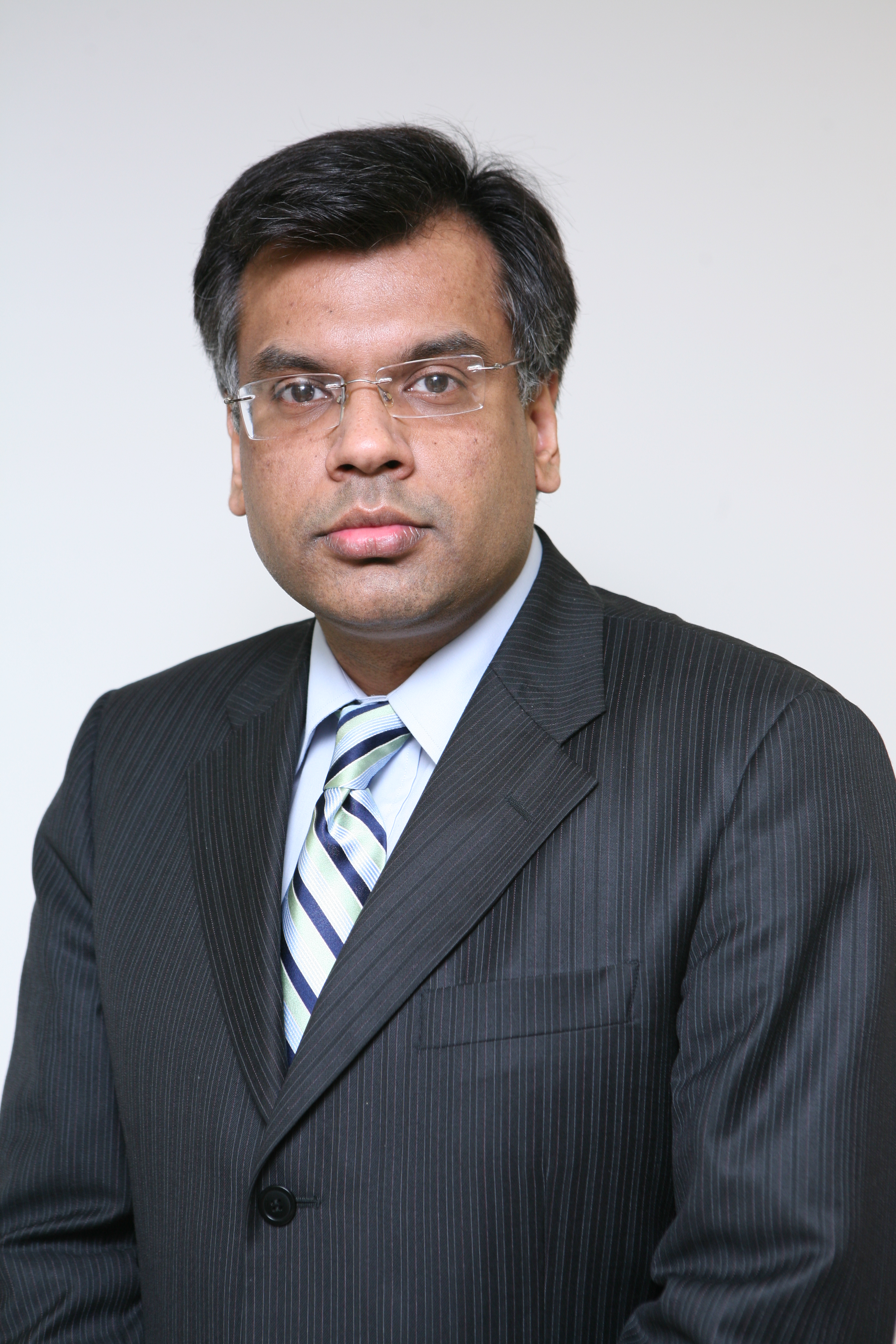
- Chief Executive of General Atomics Global Corporation
- Born: 5 March 1969 (age 57); Jakarta, Indonesia
- Occupation: Chief Executive at General Atomics Global Corporation

Vivek Lall (born 5 March 1969) is an American scientist who has been Chief Executive of General Atomics Global Corporation since 1 June 2020. Before joining General Atomics, Dr Lall worked at Lockheed Martin, and held key positions with Boeing and Lockheed Martin. Lall previously worked at General Atomics from August 2014 to December 2017. He has also worked with Raytheon. Lall was heading the Boeing (Defence and Space) operations in India from 2007 through April 2011. Lall previously worked for the US-based global defense and nuclear giant General Atomics as the global Chief Executive for International Commercial Strategic Development for General Atomics.

He was also affiliated with the United Nations in New York to advise on Broadband and Cyber Security issues for challenges within the global community and provide services that will help address them.

== Early life ==
Lall was born on 5 March 1969 in Jakarta, Indonesia. Lall began his technical education at Canada's Carleton University and earned his bachelor's degree in Mechanical Engineering. He was also instrumental in conducting research on single-engine blades for Canada's National Aeronautical Establishment. Lall completed his Aeronautical Engineering master's degree from Embry-Riddle Aeronautical University in Florida. He then worked with NASA Ames Research Center where he was part of a project undertaking research work. With a fellowship from NASA, he finished his PhD in aerospace engineering at Wichita State University, Kansas.

== Career ==
During his tenure in defense company Raytheon, he worked on the Joint Primary Aircraft Training System (JPATS) Beechcraft T-6 Texan II. He also worked on various disciplines at the NASA Ames Research Center. In 1996, Lall joined The Boeing Company as an aerospace engineer and working on computational fluid dynamics and air elasticity and loads and dynamics for the 757-300 and 777 aircraft. He moved from engineering to management and later. In 2003, Boeing moved Lall to Delhi, India, as managing director of Boeing Commercial Airplanes. During his tenure, Boeing secured $25 billion worth of commercial aircraft business in India. In May 2007, Lall was appointed as vice-president and Country Head for India, Boeing Defense Space & Security. Under his leadership, Boeing concluded the US-India defence deals for C17 strategic lift, P-8I Anti-submarine warfare aircraft and Harpoon Missiles. Lall has previously worked with another defence company, Raytheon. At Reliance, Lall worked on homeland security projects.

On 2 January 2018 Lockheed Martin announced the appointment of Lall as vice president, Aeronautics Strategy and Business Development.

== Associations ==
- Lall was appointed as Chairman of the Indo-US Strategic Dialogue by the Indo-American Chamber of Commerce in August 2011
- Lall was appointed as Distinguished Fellow at India's think tank Observer Research Foundation.
- He also served as Chairman of the Defense Committee of The Association of Chambers of Commerce and Industry of India (ASSOCHAM)
