= Daniel P. Woodward =

United States Air Force general

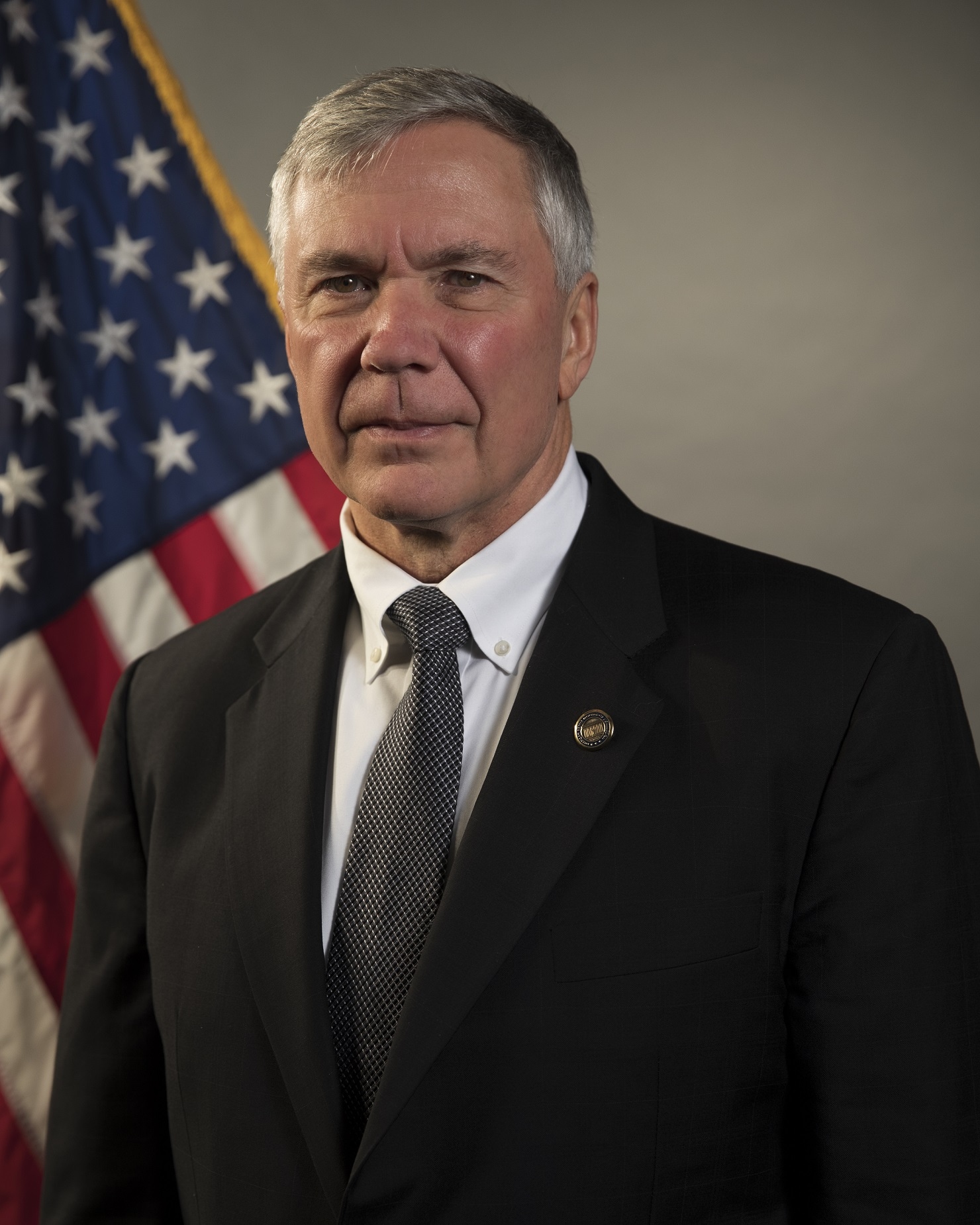
- Woodward in 2022
- Spouse: Margaret H. Woodward
- Military career
- Allegiance: United States of America
- Branch: U.S. Air Force
- Service years: 1980–2009
- Rank: Brigadier general
- Commands: 78th Support Group; 47th Flying Training Wing

Daniel P. Woodward is an American pilot and military officer who served as director of regional affairs in the Office of the Deputy Under Secretary of the Air Force for International Affairs.

== Career ==
Woodward received his commission in 1980 as a distinguished graduate of the ROTC program at Embry-Riddle Aeronautical University in Daytona Beach, Florida. He has served in a variety of operational and support positions throughout his career. The general has commanded a support group and a flying training wing. Prior to his last assignment, he was the deputy director of force management on the Joint Staff.

As director, he managed the Air Force's direct liaison with foreign government officials, Washington agency counterparts, and representatives of the aerospace industry to implement Air Force security cooperation programs, particularly the sale of Air Force military equipment to foreign governments. The Regional Affairs Directorate provides analysis and advice to senior leaders on current politico-military affairs and their impact on the Air Force. In this position he also serves as Air Force member, Delegation to Inter-American Defense Board; and Air Force member, Joint Mexico-U.S. Defense Commission.

He is rated as a command pilot with more than 3,000 flight hours. Aircraft flown include: T-37, T-38, FB-111A.

== Personal ==
In the 2024 United States presidential election, Woodward endorsed Kamala Harris.

== Education ==
- 1980 Bachelor of Aeronautical Science degree, Embry-Riddle Aeronautical University, Daytona Beach, Florida
- 1985 Squadron Officer School, Maxwell Air Force Base, Alabama
- 1989 Master of Business Administration degree, Mississippi State University, Starkville
- 1993 Air Command and Staff College
- 1995 Air War College, Maxwell AFB, Alabama

== Assignments ==
1. October 1980 – October 1981, student, undergraduate pilot training, Columbus AFB, Miss.
2. October 1981 – March 1986, T-38 instructor pilot and flight examiner, 14th Flying Training Wing, Columbus AFB, Miss.
3. March 1986 – October 1990, FB-111A instructor pilot and assistant operations officer, 380th Bomb Wing, Plattsburgh AFB, N.Y.
4. October 1990 – June 1994, T-37 flight commander, wing executive officer, and Chief, Wing Safety, 47th Flying Training Wing, Laughlin AFB, Texas
5. June 1994 – June 1995, student, Air War College, Maxwell AFB, Ala.
6. June 1995 – March 1998, Chief, Combat Training Range Branch; executive officer, Directorate of Operations and Training, Deputy Chief of Staff for, Air and Space Operations, Headquarters U.S. Air Force, Washington, D.C.
7. March 1998 – February 2000, Deputy Commander, 92d Support Group, Fairchild AFB, Wash.
8. March 2000 – December 2001, Commander, 78th Support Group, Robins AFB, Ga.
9. January 2002 – August 2002, executive officer to the Commander, Headquarters Air Education and Training Command, Randolph AFB, Texas
10. August 2002 – August 2004, Commander, 47th Flying Training Wing, Laughlin AFB, Texas
11. August 2004 – January 2006, Chief, Forces Division (J-8), Joint Staff, the Pentagon, Washington, D.C.
12. January 2006 – February 2007, deputy director, Force Management, Directorate for Force Structure, Resources and Assessment (J-8), Joint Staff, the Pentagon, Washington, D.C.
13. March 2007 – 2009, Director of Regional Affairs, Office of the Deputy Under Secretary of the Air Force for International Affairs, Headquarters U.S. Air Force, Washington, D.C.

== Major awards and decorations ==
- Legion of Merit
- Meritorious Service Medal with three oak leaf clusters
- Joint Service Commendation Medal
- Air Force Commendation Medal with oak leaf cluster
- Air Force Achievement Medal with oak leaf cluster
- Air Force Outstanding Unit Award with four oak leaf clusters
- Air Force Organizational Excellence Award with oak leaf cluster
- Combat Readiness Medal
- National Defense Service Medal with bronze star
- Global War on Terrorism Expeditionary Medal
- Global War on Terrorism Service Medal

== Effective dates of promotion ==
- Second lieutenant April 19, 1980
- First lieutenant October 19, 1982
- Captain October 19, 1984
- Major October 1, 1991
- Lieutenant colonel March 1, 1994
- Colonel March 1, 2000
- Brigadier general July 3, 2006
