= Irene Leverton =

American pilot

- Born: March 3, 1927
- Died: July 23, 2017 (aged 90)

Irene H. Leverton (March 3, 1927 – July 23, 2017) was an American pilot and a member of the Mercury 13 project, a research program that aimed to train women as astronauts.

== Life ==
Leverton was born in Chicago on March 3, 1927, and began her lengthy career as a pilot in 1944, when she joined the Civil Air Patrol. She became a member of the Ninety-Nines: International Organization of Women Pilots in 1948.

In 1961, Leverton was selected for what is now known as the Mercury 13 project, a privately funded program that enlisted women to undergo some of the same physical and psychological tests as the male astronauts of Mercury 7. Although it was never an official NASA program, members of the First Lady Astronaut Trainees (also known as FLATs) secretly trained to become astronauts for America's first human spaceflight program in the early 1960s.

Leverton graduated from San Jose State College with an Associate of Arts degree in 1976, later receiving her flight training from Embry–Riddle Aeronautical University. In the 1980s, she relocated to Phoenix before settling in Prescott, where she founded her business, Aviation Resource Management, in 1985. A certificated Federal Aviation Administration Airline Transport Pilot, she also served as a check-ride pilot with the Civil Air Patrol squadron in Prescott.

Leverton was recognized for her contributions to aviation with inductions into the Women in Aviation International Pioneer Hall of Fame in 1966 and the Arizona Aviation Hall of Fame in 2004. She died in 2017 at age 90 in Paulden, Arizona.
