= Alan Lindenmoyer =

American aeronautical engineer

Alan J. Lindenmoyer
- Born: United States
- Education: M.S. Aerospace engineering
- Employer: NASA
- Spouse: Karen Lindenmoyer

Alan J. Lindenmoyer is an American aeronautical engineer. He is the manager of NASA's Commercial Crew and Cargo Program Office (C3PO) at NASA's Johnson Space Center.

He is responsible for managing NASA’s investments to stimulate efforts within the private sector to develop and demonstrate space transportation capabilities that could ultimately lead to the availability of commercial cargo and human spaceflight services.

Mr. Lindenmoyer has over 30 years of experience in NASA’s human spaceflight programs. He joined the Goddard Space Flight Center in 1982 as a cooperative education student and became a flight structures engineer upon receiving a Bachelor of Science degree in Aeronautical Studies with Engineering and a commercial/instrument pilot license from Embry-Riddle Aeronautical University in 1983. In 1986, he received a Master of Science degree in Aerospace Engineering from the University of Maryland. Mr. Lindenmoyer joined NASA Headquarters in 1987 as a structural dynamics manager for the Space Station Freedom Program. He moved to Houston in 1990 where he held progressively more responsible management positions in the International Space Station Program; including Assistant Manager for the Vehicle Office, Assistant to the Deputy Program Manager for Technical Development, Manager of the Configuration Management Office, and Technical Integration Manager.

Mr. Lindenmoyer received NASA’s Distinguished Service Medal, two NASA Outstanding Leadership Medals, and numerous other awards and fellowships throughout his career.
