= Jeffrey B. Cashman =

United States Air Force general

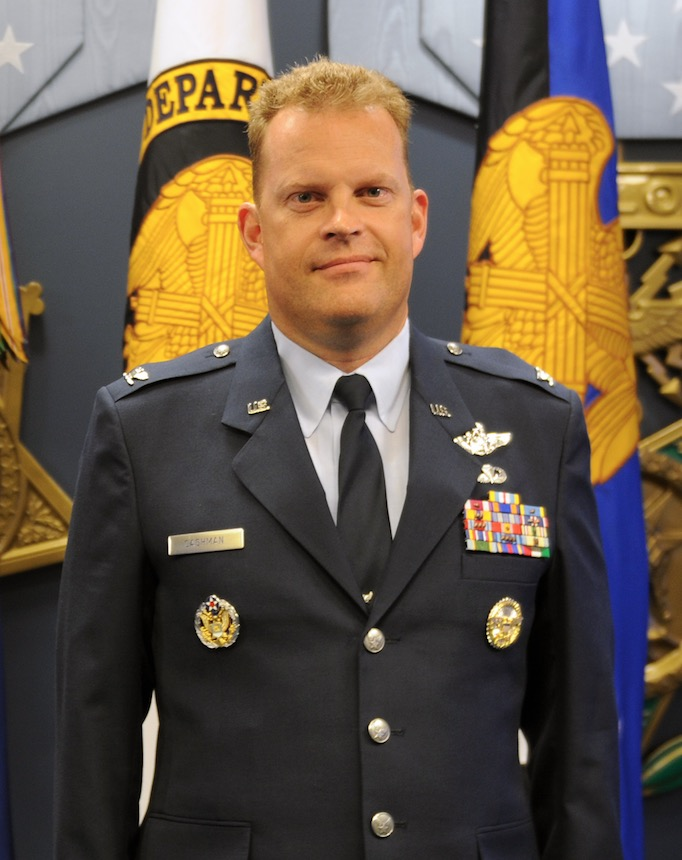
- Air Force Brigadier General Jeffrey Cashman at his promotion ceremony, 2015

Jeffrey B. Cashman is a brigadier general in the Air National Guard of the United States.

== Career ==
Cashman graduated from the United States Air Force Academy in 1989 and began training at Reese Air Force Base and Castle Air Force Base. In 1991, he was assigned as a Boeing B-52 Stratofortress with the 9th Bomb Squadron and the 20th Bomb Squadron. The following year, he became a B-52 pilot and Cessna T-37 Tweet instructor pilot at K. I. Sawyer Air Force Base. Cashman was later a T-37 instructor pilot, evaluation pilot and flight commander with the 8th Flying Training Squadron.

After being assigned to the 435th Fighter Training Squadron, Cashman transferred to the Vermont Air National Guard in 1999 and was a member of the 148th Fighter Squadron of the Arizona Air National Guard until 2000. From 2000 to 2005, he was a General Dynamics F-16 Fighting Falcon pilot with the 134th Fighter Squadron. He was then assigned to the National Guard Bureau until 2008 and the Office of the United States Secretary of Defense until 2010.

After returning to the National Guard Bureau, Cashman was stationed at Joint Base Andrews from 2011 to 2012. Cashman then became executive assistant to the chief of the National Guard Bureau. He remained in the position until 2014, when he was assigned to the Wisconsin Air National Guard. Among his duties was serving as acting vice commander of the 128th Air Refueling Wing. In 2015, Cashman became special assistant to the director of the Air National Guard.

Awards Cashman has received include the Defense Superior Service Medal, the Meritorious Service Medal, the Air Medal, the Aerial Achievement Medal, the Air Force Commendation Medal, the Air Force Achievement Medal, the Air Force Outstanding Unit Award, the National Defense Service Medal, the Southwest Asia Service Medal, the Global War on Terrorism Service Medal, the Military Outstanding Volunteer Service Medal, the Nuclear Deterrence Operations Service Medal, the Air Force Longevity Service Award, the Armed Forces Reserve Medal and the Air Force Training Ribbon.

== Education ==
- United States Air Force Academy
- Embry–Riddle Aeronautical University, Daytona Beach
- Air War College
- Georgetown University
- Massachusetts Institute of Technology
