= Ben Brainard =

American stand-up comedian and social media personality

- Born: 1996 (age 29–30); Ormond Beach, Florida
- Education: Embry–Riddle Aeronautical University
- Notable work: The Table

Comedy career
- Years active: 2017–present
- Medium: Stand-up; TikTok; social media
- Genres: Sketch comedy; political satire; observational comedy

TikTok information
- Page: Ben Brainard
- Followers: 2.9M

YouTube information
- Channel: Ben Brainard
- Subscribers: 990K
- Views: 726M
- Last updated: 20 July 2026
- Website: benbrainard.com

Ben Brainard (born 1996) is an American stand-up comedian and social media personality. He gained attention on TikTok and other social media with his sketch series The Table, in which he acts out conversations between various U.S. states. As of 06 May 2024, he has 2.9 million TikTok followers.

== Early life ==
Brainard grew up in Ormond Beach, Florida. He attended Daytona Beach's Embry–Riddle Aeronautical University, studying physics, computer-aided design and manufacturing in the school's mechanical engineering program. Bored with his calculus studies, Brainard dropped out of Embry-Riddle and joined the United States Army Reserve as a specialist, where he would use his talent for impressions to prank other soldiers. One of his early TikTok videos poked fun at his unit's use of Microsoft Teams and Microsoft PowerPoint for virtual briefings.

== Career ==
Brainard's army service brought him to Orlando, where he began his comedy career in 2017, performing several open mics at the Drunken Monkey. After a planned comedy tour in Georgia was cancelled due to the COVID-19 pandemic, Brainard began posting comedy sketches to TikTok in 2020, after a friend had suggested he join the app. He initially planned to only do a video a day for a few weeks during quarantine, posting sketches as well as participating in TikTok trends.

Brainard's first viral video, posted March 30, 2020 and captioned “The first COVID-19 meeting in America. FL was also there.,” was a sketch in which he acted out the states of Washington, D.C., New York, Texas, California, Florida, and West Virginia sitting around a table to discuss the pandemic's impact on larger cities. This sketch became a series entitled The Table, in which Brainard acts out the various U.S. states arguing with each other. His Florida character, depicted as absent-minded, indifferent, and party-obsessed and modeled on the Florida Man meme, became a fan favorite. The series often satirizes politics and current events, including issues related to COVID-19, the George Floyd protests, hurricane parties, the 2020 United States presidential election, and the decisions of the Florida State Government. Brainard summarizes the series as "I dress up like the states of America, sit down at a table, and talk about how nobody's doing well".

Brainard saw rapid success on TikTok, gaining 1 million followers and verification within six months. As of August 2022, he had reached 2.7 million followers on the app. His content has also found success on Instagram, Facebook, and YouTube (including YouTube Shorts); on the latter platform, he had over 480,000 subscribers in June 2022. Brainard's comedy was noticed by Orlando Rep. Anna Eskamani, who collaborated with him on a 2021 TikTok skit critiquing Florida Governor Ron DeSantis's anti-protesting legislation. The video gained over 1 million views on TikTok and 50,000 on YouTube.

As a content creator, Brainard earns revenue from video advertisements, Patreon, and the TikTok Creator Fund. In a 2021 video, Brainard joined fellow TikToker Hank Green in criticizing the app's system for paying creators, noting that he had made more money from YouTube and Facebook the previous December despite having more views on TikTok.

Since finding success on TikTok, Brainard has performed at Margaritaville Resort Orlando, The Funny Bone, and Red Rock Resort, and opened for comedian Drew Lynch.

== Personal life ==
Originally based in Orlando, Brainard moved to Los Angeles's North Hollywood neighborhood in late 2021. He has ADHD. Brainard has expressed hope that his The Table videos can "help people realize that they’re not that different from the people on the other side of the country."
