= Operation Homefront =

American non-profit organization

- Type: Nonprofit
- Purpose: Humanitarian
- Headquarters: Arlington, Virginia and San Antonio, Texas
- Region served: United States
- COO and President: Brig. Gen. (ret.) Robert D. Thomas.

Operation Homefront is a nonprofit 501(c)(3) organization founded in 2002 to serve ill or injured veterans and their families. It is headquartered in San Antonio, Texas, and Arlington, Virginia. The organization's stated mission is to "build strong, stable, and secure military and veteran families by improving their financial, emotional and social well-being." As of December 2024, the president and CEO is Rear Admiral Alan Reyes, U.S. Navy, Retired. The organization has an annual revenue of $50 million. Operation Homefront only operates within the United States.

== History ==
After the events of September 11, 2001, there was an increased strain on military service members and their families. Operation Homefront was formed as a response, and they began providing emergency assistance for U.S. troops and their families. It was founded under the name CincHouse.com Inc. in 2002, and it was granted an organization tax exempt status under the name Operation Homefront in 2005.

Operation Homefront has fulfilled over 63,000 requests from military families across the U.S., providing more than $44 million in relief through the Critical Financial Assistance program.

An Operation Homefront Christmas event

Operation Homefront focuses their programming on critical financial assistance, housing, and family programs for military and veteran families. Their programs include financial assistance for critical needs such as rent, utilities, and food assistance, transitional housing, and permanent housing. They also coordinate recurring support programs include Star Spangled Baby Showers, Back-To-School Brigade, Holiday Meals for Military, Holiday Toy Drive, and Military Child of the Year Award.

== Evaluations ==
Operation Homefront has a Platinum Seal of Transparency from Candid, meaning it is in the top 0.1% of non-profit organizations nationally in terms of transparency. It is highly rated on Charity Navigator and meets all charity accreditation standards of the Better Business Bureau. However, Charities for Vets does not recommend giving to Operation Homefront based on their 2022 Tax Report indicating they spend higher than the recommended amount on overhead costs.
