= Terry L. Bullard =

United States Air Force Brigadier General (Special Agent)

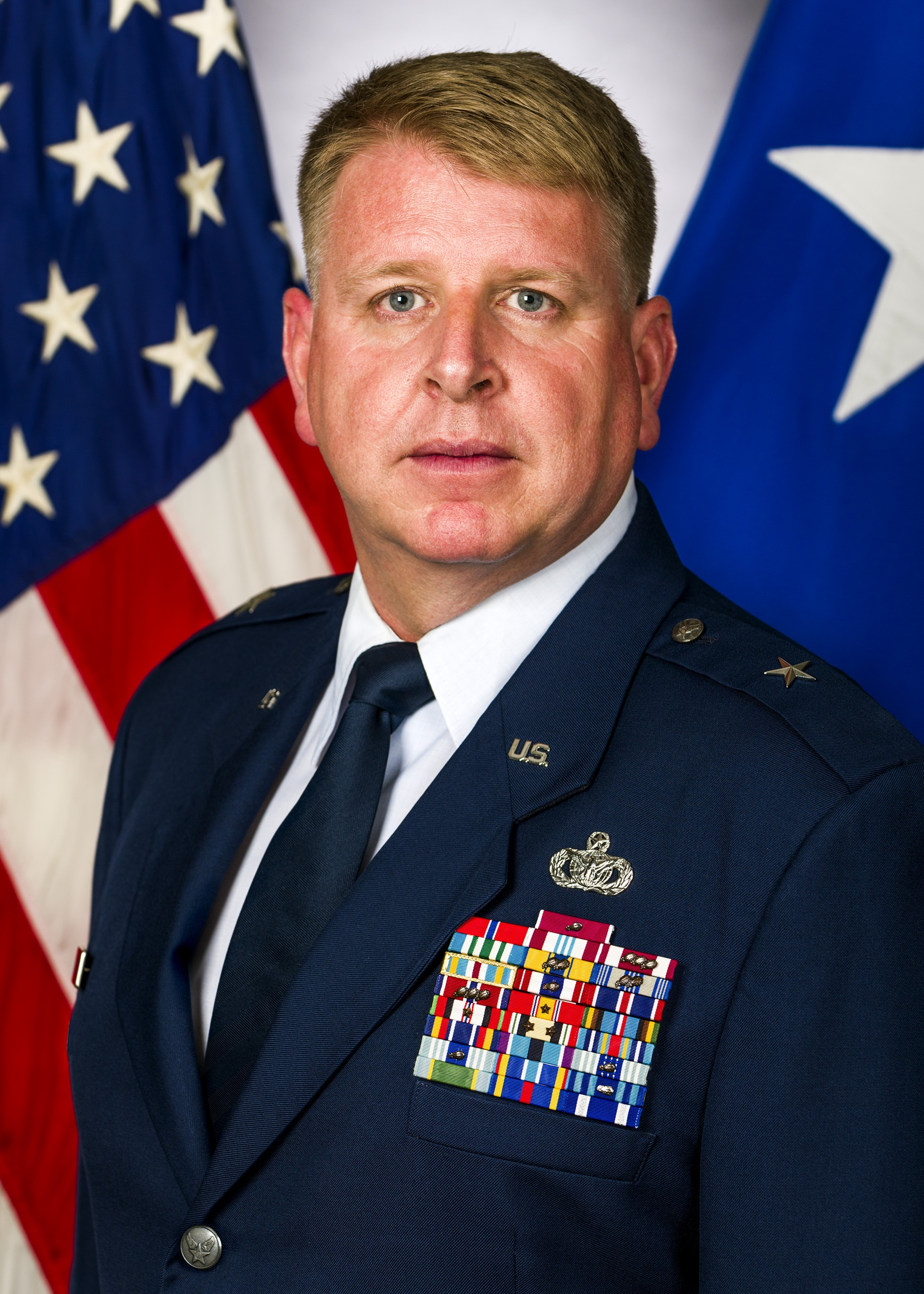
- Alma mater: The Citadel (BS); George Washington University (MS); Air Command and Staff College (MS); Air War College (MS)
- Military career
- Allegiance: United States
- Branch: United States Air Force
- Service years: 1993–2023
- Rank: Brigadier General
- Commands: Air Force Office of Special Investigations; AFOSI 2nd Field Investigations Region; AFOSI 24th Expeditionary Field Investigations Squadron; AFOSI Detachment 512; AFOSI Detachment 601
- Conflicts: War in Afghanistan; Iraq War
- Awards: Legion of Merit; Bronze Star Medal

Terry L. Bullard is a United States Air Force brigadier general (Special Agent) and was the 19th Commander of the Air Force Office of Special Investigations (AFOSI), Quantico, Virginia. As the AFOSI Commander, Bullard derived his independent criminal and counterintelligence investigative and operational authorities directly from the Secretary of the Air Force and executed the Field Operating Agency's mission through a network of over 3,000 Total Force Airmen assigned to major Air Force installations and a variety of operating locations worldwide.

== Education ==
Bullard is a distinguished graduate of the Air Force Reserve Officer Training Corps at The Citadel. He holds a Master of Forensic Science from George Washington University, a Master of Military Operational Art and Science from the Air Command and Staff College, and a Master of Strategic Studies from the Air War College. Bullard is also a graduate of Squadron Officer School, Armed Forces Institute of Pathology, and The Kenan-Flagler Business School.

== Military career ==
Bullard entered the United States Air Force in July 1993, as a graduate of the ROTC program at The Citadel. He has served in a variety of AFOSI positions as a Special Agent, Operations Officer (garrison and deployed), Forensic Science Specialist, Joint Staff Officer, two-time Detachment Commander in overseas locations in the U.S. Indo-Pacific Command and U.S. European Command areas of responsibility, a Squadron Commander, and Region Commander, and has taught on the faculty of Air University in both the Research and Strategy Departments. Additionally, Bullard has deployed five times throughout the U.S. Central Command (USCENTCOM) area of responsibility in a variety of positions. He has served at the tactical level conducting counterintelligence-related activities, at the operational level as the Deputy J2X Forward, USCENTCOM, and as Commander, 24th Expeditionary Field Investigations Squadron. Prior to his AFOSI appointment, the general was the Vice Commander, Headquarters AFOSI, Quantico, Virginia.

=== AFOSI appointment ===
Bullard became the 19th Commander of AFOSI during a change of command ceremony at the Fort Belvoir, Virginia, Officer's Club, May 16, 2019. He accepted the reins of responsibility and leadership for the Air Force's federal law enforcement, criminal investigations and counterintelligence enforcement agency from the 18th Commander, Colonel Kirk B. Stabler. Earlier that day, then Col. Bullard was accorded his promotion ceremony to brigadier general, and Lt. Gen. Sami D. Said, The Inspector General of the Air Force was the presiding officer over both ceremonies.

=== Assignments ===
- September 1993 – July 1996, Special Agent, AFOSI Detachment 111, Edwards AFB, Calif.
- July 1996 – July 1998, Operations Officer, AFOSI Detachment 209 and Chief, Detachment 209 OL-A, Headquarters Eighth Air Force, Barksdale AFB, La.
- July 1998 – July 2000, Commander, AFOSI Detachment 601, Hickam AFB, Hawaii
- July 2000 – September 2001, Student, Air Force Institute of Technology, George Washington University, Washington, D.C., and Forensic Medicine Fellow, Armed Forces Institute of Pathology, Rockville, Md.
- September 2001 – July 2004, Chief, Forensic Science Branch, AFOSI Detachment 303, Travis AFB, Calif.
- July 2004 – July 2005, student, Air Command and Staff College, Maxwell AFB, Ala.
- July 2005 – September 2006, Deputy J2X-Forward and Counterintelligence Coordinating Authority-Qatar, Camp As Saliyah, Qatar
- September 2006 – July 2009, Commander, AFOSI Detachment 512, Lakenheath – Mildenhall, United Kingdom
- July 2009 – July 2012, AFOSI Command Chair, Air University, and Student, Air War College, Maxwell AFB, Ala.
- July 2012 – July 2013, Commander, AFOSI 24th Expeditionary Field Investigations Squadron and Director, AFOSI Special Staff, Headquarters AFCENT, Al Udeid AB, Qatar
- July 2013 – June 2014, Vice Commander, AFOSI 2nd Field Investigations Region, Joint Base Langley-Eustis, Va.
- June 2014 – May 2017, Commander, AFOSI 2nd Field Investigations Region, Joint Base Langley-Eustis, Va.
- July 2010 – July 2012, Chief, Commander's Action Group, Headquarters Air Force Office of Special Investigations, Andrews AFB, Md. and Quantico, Va.
- May 2017 – May 2019, Vice Commander, Headquarters AFOSI, Quantico, Va.
- May 2019 – May 2023, Commander, Headquarters AFOSI, Quantico, Va.

Joint Assignments

- July 2005 – September 2006, Deputy J2X-Forward and Counterintelligence Coordinating Authority-Qatar, Camp As Saliyah, Qatar, as a Major

=== Effective dates of promotion ===
Insignia	Rank	Date
	Brigadier General	May 3, 2019
	Colonel	September 1, 2013
	Lieutenant Colonel	September 1, 2007
	Major	July 1, 2003
	Captain	July 20, 1997
	First Lieutenant	July 20, 1995
	Second Lieutenant	July 20, 1993

=== Major awards and decorations ===
Bullard is the recipient of the following:

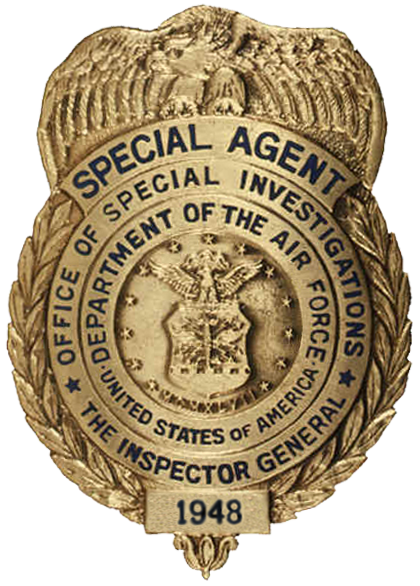

1st Row	Legion of Merit with 1 oak leaf cluster		Bronze Star Medal
2nd Row	Defense Meritorious Service Medal with 1 oak leaf cluster	Meritorious Service Medal with 3 oak leaf clusters	Joint Service Commendation Medal
3rd Row	Air Force Commendation Medal with 2 oak leaf clusters	Air Force Achievement Medal with 2 oak leaf clusters	Afghanistan Campaign Medal with bronze service star
4th Row	Iraq Campaign Medal with 2 bronze service stars	Global War on Terrorism Expeditionary Medal	Humanitarian Service Medal

Air Force Force Protection Badge	Air Force Office of Special Investigations Badge

== See also ==
- List of Commanders of the Air Force Office of Special Investigations

== Notes ==
Military offices
Preceded by Kirk B. Stabler	Commander of the Air Force Office of Special Investigations; 2019–present	Incumbent
