= Keith M. Givens =

Retired American United States Air Force Brigadier General (Special Agent)

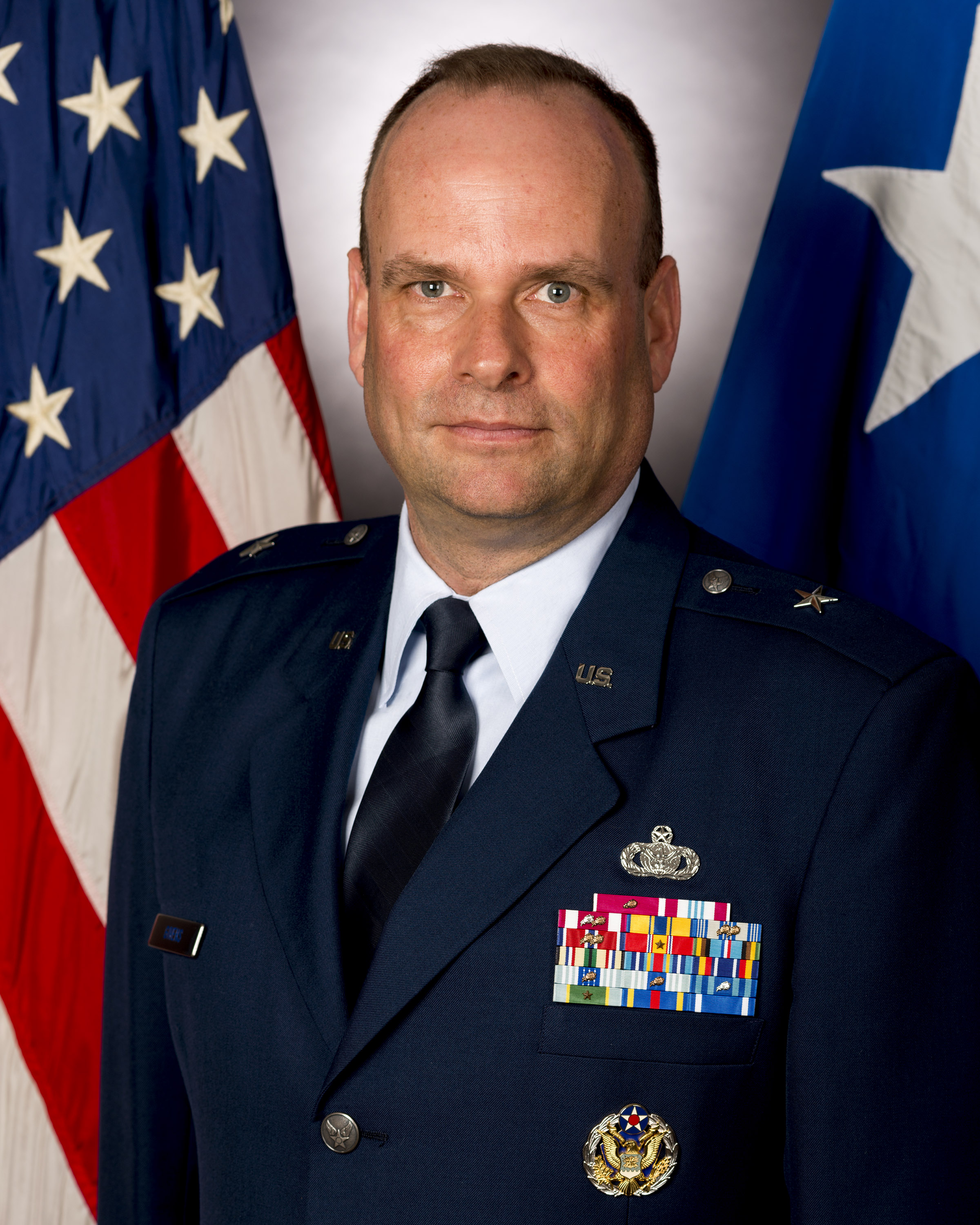
- Military career
- Allegiance: United States
- Branch: United States Air Force
- Service years: 1986 – 2017
- Rank: Brigadier General (Ret.)
- Commands: Air Force Office of Special Investigations
- Awards: 9 major decorations: Legion of Merit; Defense Meritorious Service Medal; Meritorious Service Medal; Air Force Commendation Medal; Air Force Achievement Medal; National Defense Service Medal; Armed Forces Expeditionary Medal; Southwest Asia Service Medal; Global War on Terrorism Service Medal

Keith M. Givens is a retired United States Air Force Brigadier General (Special Agent) who served as the 17th Commander of the Air Force Office of Special Investigations (AFOSI), Quantico, Virginia. As the AFOSI Commander, Givens oversaw AFOSI's worldwide network of over 2,000 military and civilian special agents and over 500 unsworn members stationed at major Air Force installations and a variety of worldwide special operating locations.

== Education ==
Givens is a distinguished graduate of the Air Force Reserve Officer Training Corps at the Slippery Rock University of Pennsylvania. He holds a Master of Science from Chapman University, a Master of Forensic Sciences from the George Washington University, a Master of Aerospace and Leadership Studies from the Air Command and Staff College, and a Master of National Security Studies from the National War College.

== Military career ==
Givens entered the United States Air Force in May 1986. He spent the majority of his career as a special agent of the AFOSI where he conducted and supervised felony-level criminal, fraud, and counterintelligence investigations and operations. He commanded at the detachment, squadron and wing levels. His assignments included four overseas postings. Prior to his last assignment as Commander of AFOSI, Givens served as the Director, Special Investigation, Office of the Inspector General, Office of the Secretary of the Air Force, Washington, D.C. He led the directorate in developing and implementing all Air Force-level plans and policies concerning criminal investigations and counterintelligence operations.

=== AFOSI appointment ===
Givens officially took command and became the 17th Commander of AFOSI during a change of command ceremony held at Quantico, VA, on May 7, 2014. Givens received the AFOSI guidon from Lieutenant General Stephen P. Mueller, Inspector General of the Air Force, which officially denoted the departure of Brigadier General Kevin J. Jacobsen as outgoing AFOSI Commander.

Addressing AFOSI personnel for the first time as their commander, Givens thanked LTG Mueller for entrusting him. "I consider this a distinct honor," he remarked. "Being a general is not about the rank. It's about what I can do for AFOSI and its people. The five points on these stars also remind me of the five most important people in my life," Givens said.

The change of command ceremony was attended by approximately 300 people represented by AFOSI Special Agents, DoD employees and members of the Givens' and Jacobsen families.

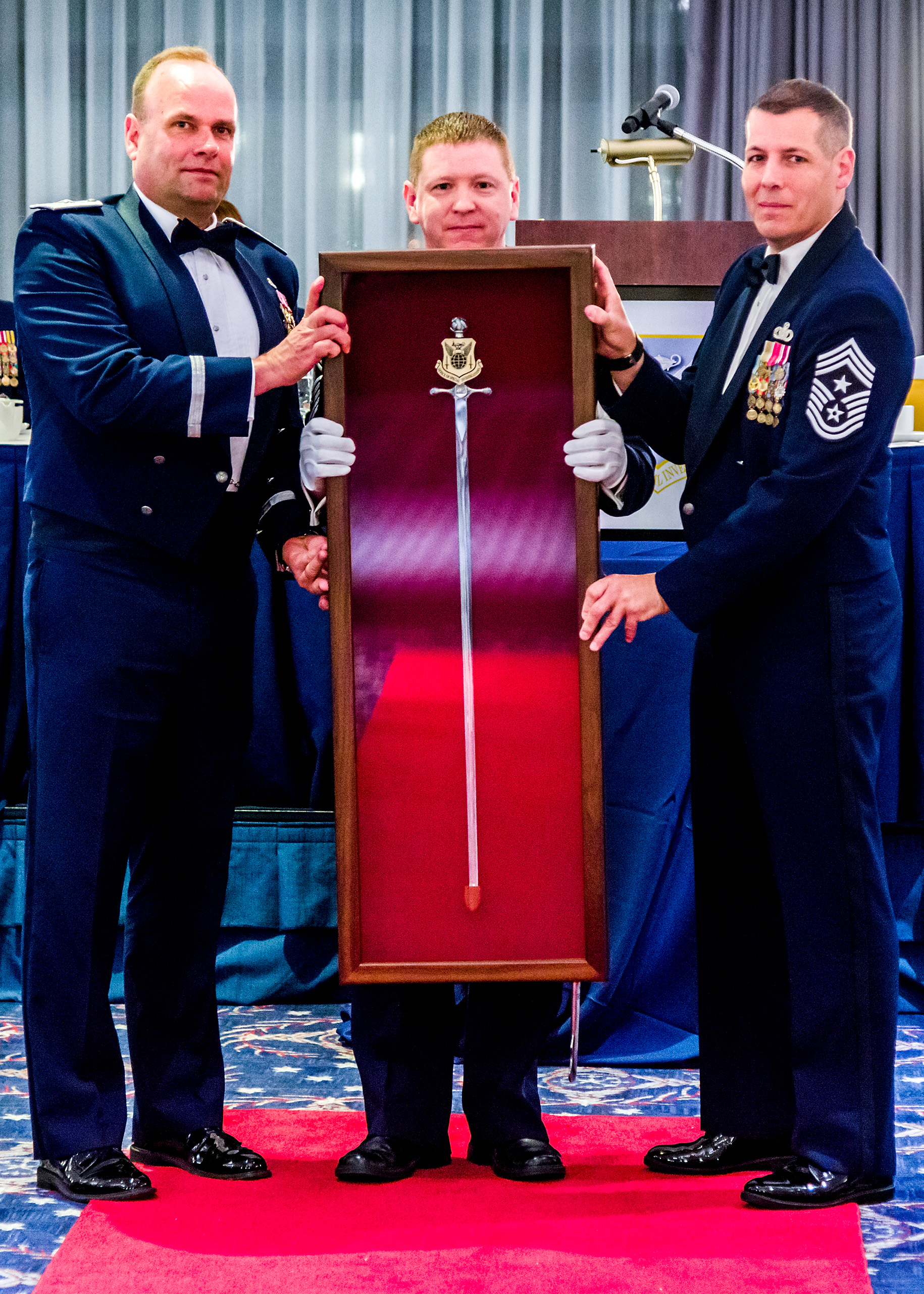
Givens (left) receives a personal sword during an Order of the Sword Induction ceremony on May 19, 2017, at Joint Base Anacostia-Bolling, D.C.

=== Assignments ===
- September 1986 - July 1987, Undergraduate Pilot Training, Laughlin AFB, TX.
- August 1987 – June 1989, Special Agent, AFOSI Detachment 516, Scott AFB, Ill.
- June 1989 – June 1991, Chief, Counterintelligence Collections Branch and Operations Officer, AFOSI Detachment 4240, Clark AB, Philippines
- July 1991 – July 1994, Commander, AFOSI Detachment 307, Plattsburgh AFB, NY (Deployed AFOSI Commander, Operation RESTORE HOPE, Mogadishu, Somalia, December 1992 – March 1993)
- August 1994 – August 1995, Student in Forensic Medicine, Air Force Institute of Technology, George Washington University, Washington, D.C.
- August 1995 – July 1998, European Regional Forensic Consultant, AFOSI, Royal Air Force Mildenhall, England
- July 1998 – June 2000, Executive Officer to the Commander, Headquarters AFOSI, Andrews AFB, Md.
- August 2000 – July 2001, Student, Air Command and Staff College, Maxwell AFB, Ala.
- July 2001 – April 2003, Commander, AFOSI Detachment 531, Aviano AB, Italy
- April 2003 – July 2005, Commander, AFOSI 53rd Field Investigations Squadron, Aviano Air Base, Italy
- July 2005 – June 2006, Student, National War College, National Defense University, Fort McNair, Washington, D.C.
- June 2006 – June 2007, Chief, U.S. Central Command J2X-Forward/Joint Counterintelligence Support Element, Camp As Sayliyah, Qatar
- June 2007 – December 2007, Director of Staff, Headquarters AFOSI, Andrews AFB, Md.
- December 2007 – May 2010, Commander, AFOSI 7th Field Investigations Region, Andrews AFB, Md.
- May 2010 – May 2012, Vice Commander, Headquarters AFOSI, Quantico, Va.
- May 2012 – May 2014, Director, Special Investigations, Office of the Inspector General, Headquarters Air Force, the Pentagon, Va.
- May 2014 – May 2017, Commander, Headquarters AFOSI, Quantico, Va.

Joint assignments

- June 2006 – June 2007, Chief, USCENTCOM J2X-Forward/Joint Counterintelligence Support Element, Camp As Sayliyah, Qatar, as a lieutenant colonel

=== Effective dates of promotion ===
Insignia	Rank	Date
	Brigadier General	May 30, 2014
	Colonel	Aug. 1, 2007
	Lieutenant Colonel	Sept. 1, 2002
	Major	Sept. 1, 1998
	Captain	May 10, 1990
	First Lieutenant	May 10, 1988
	Second Lieutenant	May 10, 1986

=== Major awards and decorations ===
General Givens is the recipient of the following: Distinguished Service Medal

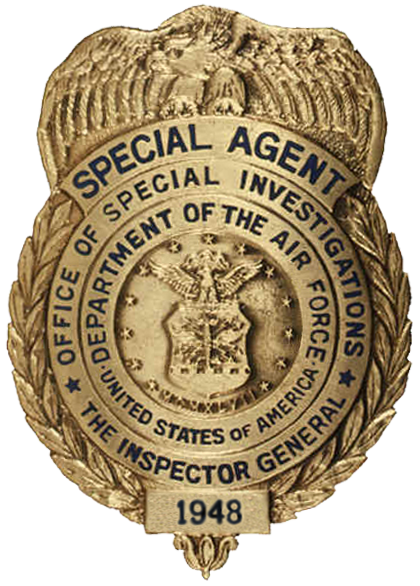

1st Row	Legion of Merit with oak leaf cluster	Defense Meritorious Service Medal	Meritorious Service Medal with one silver and one bronze oak leaf clusters
2nd Row	Air Force Commendation Medal	Air Force Achievement Medal with two oak leaf clusters	National Defense Service Medal with bronze star
3rd Row	Armed Forces Expeditionary Medal with oak leaf cluster	Southwest Asia Service Medal with campaign star	Global War on Terrorism Service Medal

Air Force Force Protection Badge	Air Force Office of Special Investigations Badge

== See also ==
- List of Commanders of the Air Force Office of Special Investigations

== Notes ==
Military offices
Preceded by BG Kevin J. Jacobsen	Commander of the Air Force Office of Special Investigations; May 2014 – May 2017	Succeeded by Col Kirk B. Stabler
