= Kirk B. Stabler =

United States Air Force Colonel (Special Agent)

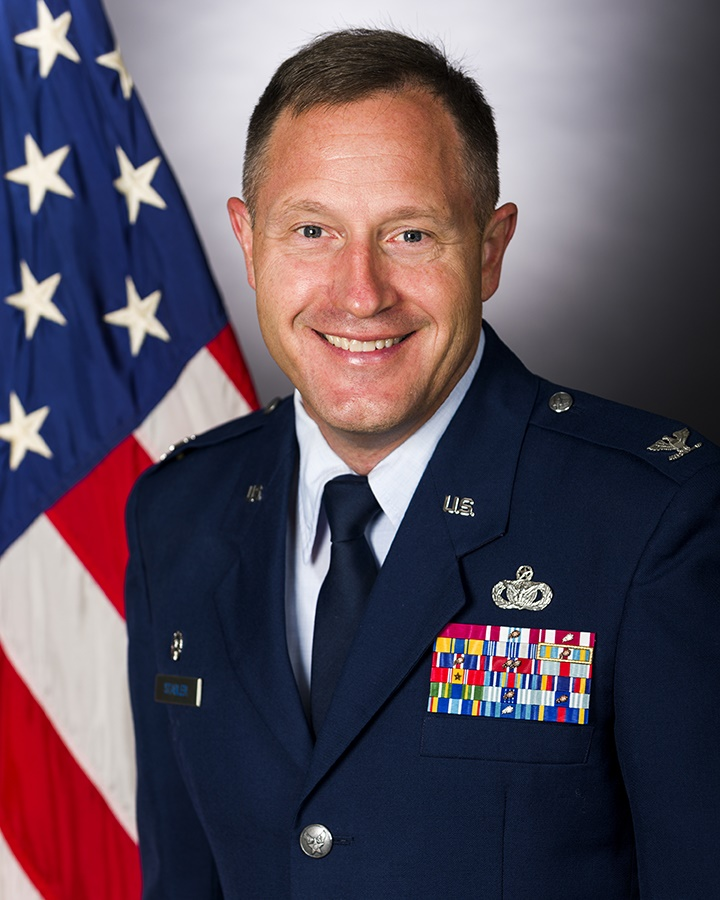
- Military career
- Allegiance: United States
- Branch: United States Air Force
- Service years: 1992–2019
- Rank: Colonel
- Commands: Air Force Office of Special Investigations
- Awards: 10 major decorations: Legion of Merit; Defense Meritorious Service Medal; Meritorious Service Medal; Air Force Commendation Medal; Air Force Achievement Medal; National Defense Service Medal; Armed Forces Expeditionary Medal; Global War on Terrorism Expeditionary Medal; Global War on Terrorism Service Medal; Korea Defense Service Medal

Kirk B. Stabler is a retired United States Air Force Colonel (Special Agent) who served as the 18th Commander of the U.S. Air Force Office of Special Investigations (AFOSI), Quantico, Virginia. As the AFOSI Commander, Stabler oversaw AFOSI's worldwide network of over 2,000 military and civilian special agents and over 500 unsworn members stationed at major Air Force installations and a variety of worldwide special operating locations.

== Early life and education ==
Stabler is a distinguished graduate of the Air Force Reserve Officer Training Corps at the University of Iowa. He holds a Master of Forensic Science from George Washington University, a Master of Strategic Studies from the Air War College, and a Master of Military Operational Art and Science from the Air Command and Staff College. Stabler is also a graduate of Squadron Officer School and Embry-Riddle Aeronautical University.

== Military career ==
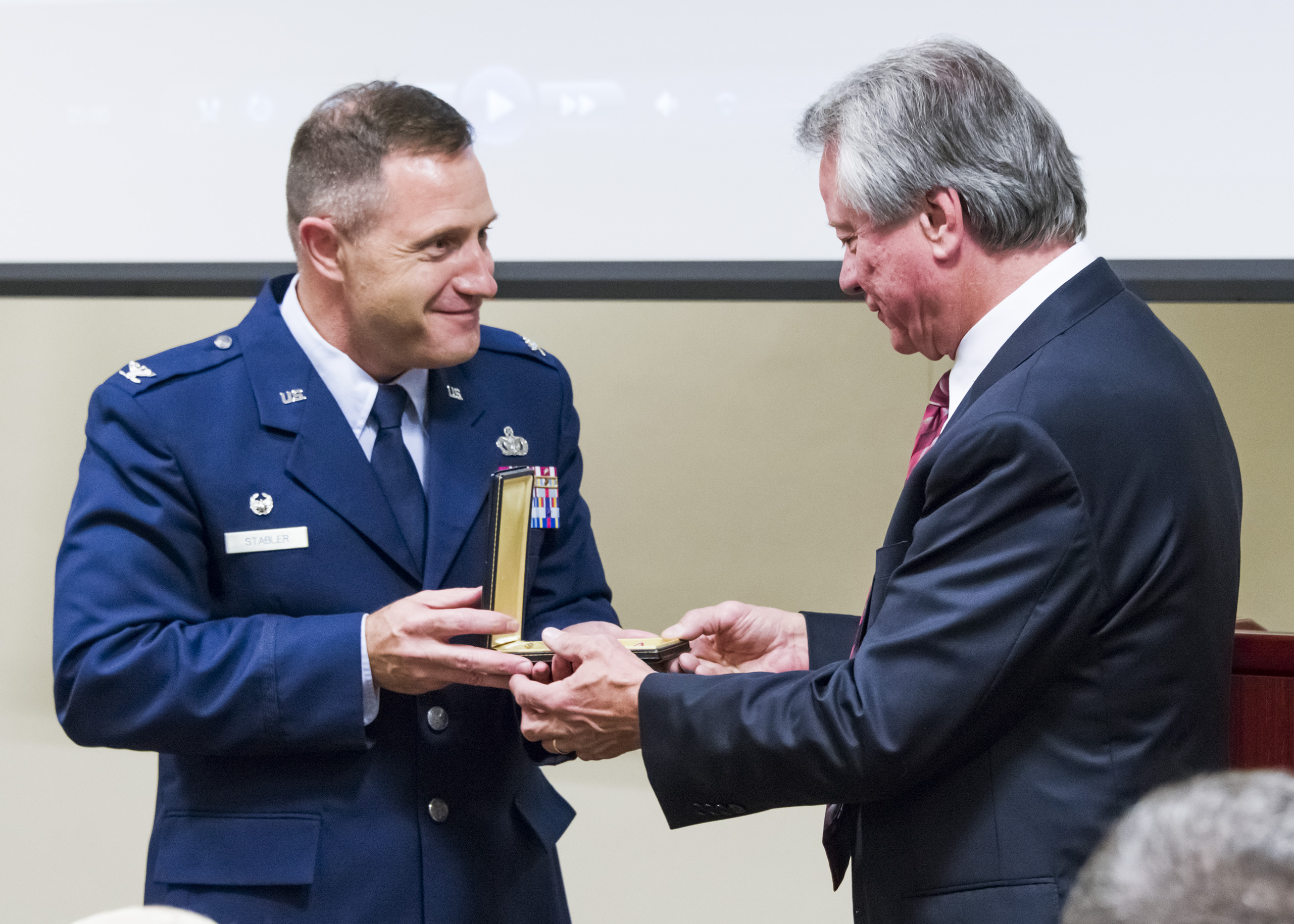
Stabler (left) presents the Bronze Star Medal of Fallen Special Agent Lee Hitchcock to his brother, Mr. Craig Hitchcock (right), during the Headquarters AFOSI inaugural Celebration of Life Remembrance Ceremony on May 22, 2017, at Quantico, VA.

Stabler entered the United States Air Force in May 1991. He has served in a variety of AFOSI positions as an investigator, operations officer, and a forensic sciences consultant and has conducted and supervised felony-level criminal, fraud and counterintelligence investigations and operations. He has commanded at the detachment, squadron and wing levels and served in a joint assignment capacity. His assignments have included five overseas postings. Prior to this assignment, Stabler served as the Vice Commander and Director, Strategic Programs and Requirements, Headquarters AFOSI, Quantico, Virginia.

=== AFOSI appointment ===
Stabler became the 18th Commander in the storied 69-year history of AFOSI on May 18, 2017. He succeeded Brigadier General (Special Agent) Keith M. Givens who welcomed the new Commander by passing him AFOSI Badge and Credential 1, May 16, 2017, in front of a standing room only audience of AFOSI headquarters members, in the Russell-Knox Building Collaboration Center, Quantico, VA. General Givens retired to the civilian sector.

=== Assignments ===
- March 1992 – April 1993, undergraduate pilot training, Vance AFB, Okla.
- April 1993 – June 1993, agent trainee, AFOSI Detachment 411 OL-A, Vance AFB, Okla.
- June 1993 – September 1994, Operations Officer, AFOSI Detachment 613, Kunsan AB, Republic of Korea.
- September 1994 – April 1997, Operations Officer, AFOSI Detachment 113, Hill AFB, Utah.
- April 1997 – August 1997, Commander, AFOSI Detachment 113, Hill AFB, Utah.
- August 1997 – July 1998, student, Air Force Institute of Technology, Washington, D.C.
- July 1998 – September 2000, Chief, Regional Forensic Sciences Branch, AFOSI Detachment 401, Randolph AFB, Texas.
- September 2000 – March 2001, Director, Criminal Operations, AFOSI Region 4, Randolph, Texas.
- March 2001 – June 2004, Commander, AFOSI Detachment 206, Nellis AFB, Nev. (August 2002 – January 2003, Commander, AFOSI Expeditionary Detachment 258, Al Udeid, Qatar).
- July 2004 – June 2005, student, Air Command and Staff College, Maxwell AFB, Ala.
- June 2005 – August 2008, Assistant Counterintelligence Staff Officer and Chief, Counterintelligence Operations Section, Headquarters United States European Command, Stuttgart-Vaihingen, Germany.
- August 2008 – July 2010, Commander, AFOSI 4th Field Investigations Squadron, Sembach Annex, Germany (October 2009 – April 2010, Task Force Counterintelligence Coordinating Authority, Combined Joint Task Force-Horn of Africa, Camp Lemonnier, Djibouti).
- July 2010 – July 2012, Chief, Commander's Action Group, Headquarters Air Force Office of Special Investigations, Andrews AFB, Md. and Quantico, Va.
- July 2012 – May 2013, student, Air War College, Maxwell AFB, Ala.
- June 2013 – July 2015, Commander, 7th Field Investigations Region, Joint Base Andrews, Md.
- July 2015 – November 2016, Director, Strategic Programs and Requirements, Headquarters Air Force Office of Special Investigations, Quantico, Va.
- November 2016 - May 2017, Vice Commander and Director, Strategic Programs and Requirements, Headquarters Air Force Office of Special Investigations, Quantico, Va.
- May 2017 - May 2019, Commander, Headquarters Air Force Office of Special Investigations, Quantico, Va.

Joint Assignments

- June 2005 - August 2008, Assistant Counterintelligence Staff officer and Chief, Counterintelligence Operations Section, Headquarters United States European Command, Stuttgart-Vaihingen, Germany, as a lieutenant colonel

=== Effective dates of promotion ===
Insignia	Rank	Date
	Colonel	April 1, 2013
	Lieutenant colonel	July 1, 2007
	Major	July 1, 2002
	Captain	October 6, 1995
	First lieutenant	October 6, 1993
	Second lieutenant	May 11, 1991

=== Major awards and decorations ===
Stabler is the recipient of the following:

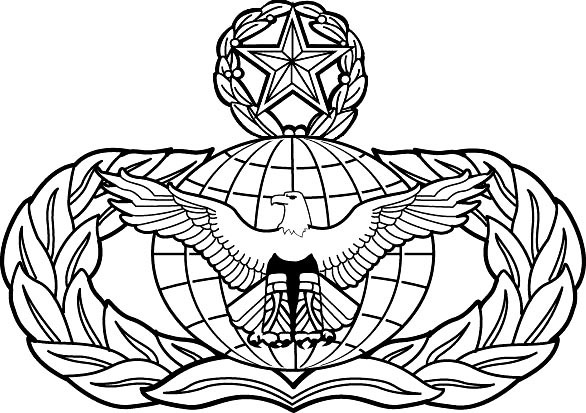

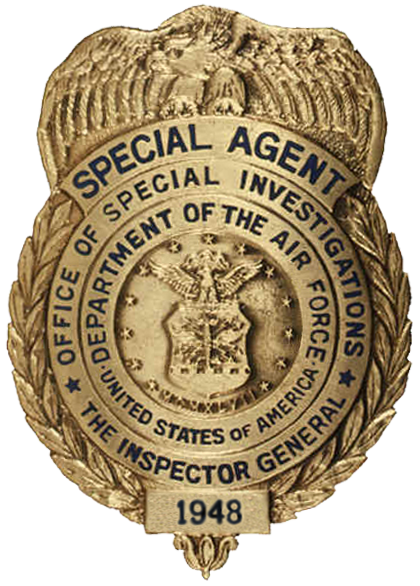

1st Row	Legion of Merit		
2nd Row	Defense Meritorious Service Medal with 1 oak leaf cluster	Meritorious Service Medal with 5 oak leaf clusters	Air Force Commendation Medal
3rd Row	Air Force Achievement Medal	National Defense Service Medal with bronze service star	Armed Forces Expeditionary Medal
4th Row	Global War on Terrorism Expeditionary Medal	Global War on Terrorism Service Medal	Korea Defense Service Medal

Air Force Force Protection Badge	Air Force Office of Special Investigations Badge

== See also ==
- List of Commanders of the Air Force Office of Special Investigations

== Notes ==
Military offices
Preceded by BG Keith M. Givens	Commander of the Air Force Office of Special Investigations; May 2017 – May 2019	Succeeded by BG Terry L. Bullard
