= Donald Nichols (spy) =

American intelligence officer (1923–1992)

- Born: 18 February 1923; Hackensack, New Jersey, U.S.
- Died: 2 June 1992 (aged 69); Tuscaloosa, Alabama, U.S.
- Military career
- Allegiance: United States
- Branch: United States Air Force
- Rank: Major
- Commands: 6004th Air Intelligence Service Squadron
- Conflicts: World War II; Korean War
- Awards: Distinguished Service Cross; Silver Star

Donald Nichols (18 February 1923 – 2 June 1992) was a United States Air Force intelligence officer during the Korean War. He and his spies found targets in North Korea for the U.S. airforce. Before the war, Nichols had also warned his superiors that North Korea was planning to invade South Korea, although this was ignored. At the start of the war, Nichols and his men broke North Korean battle codes, which helped U.S. forces survive and repel the invasion. Nichols created the Air Force's first covert intelligence unit, Detachment 2 of the 6004th Air Intelligence Service Squadron, which he commanded during most of the war. His intelligence outfit, sometimes known as "Nick," went behind enemy lines to find vulnerabilities in Soviet tanks and aircraft. His intelligence achievements won him the Silver Star and the Distinguished Service Cross.

Nichols's had a personal relationship with South Korean President Syngman Rhee whom he met in 1946. Rhee used Nichols to transmit intelligence leaks to senior U.S. commanders, which helped speed Rhee's rise to power in South Korea. As part of his collaboration with the South Korean security forces, Nichols witnessed torture, beheadings, and the mass shootings of alleged communists. He did not report these atrocities to his superiors. Nichols had near-complete autonomy from the Air Force command structure. He reported only to leading Air Force General Earle E. Partridge. Nichols had unsupervised access to large amounts of cash, which he used to pay off agents. He also brought some back to the United States.

The intelligence career of Nichols came to a sudden end in 1957, when the Air Force relieved him of his command and sent him to psychiatric wards at U.S. military hospitals, first in Tachikawa, Japan, and then at Eglin Air Force Base in Florida. His military service record indicated no history of mental illness, and Air Force colleagues said he showed no such symptoms, but Air Force doctors diagnosed Nichols as a "deteriorating schizophrenic." He was given large doses of Thorazine and forced to undergo 14 rounds of electroshock. Nichols later told relatives "that the government wanted to erase his brain—because he knew too much."

Nichols was forced to retire from the military on a medical disability in 1962. He was later charged in Florida with repeated sexual assaults on young boys and pleaded nolo contendere (no contest) in 1987 to two felony counts of lewd behavior in the presence of a child. He died in 1992 in the psychiatric ward of a veteran's hospital in Tuscaloosa, Alabama, where he had gone in lieu of imprisonment in Florida. He was inducted into the Air Commando Hall of Fame in 1981. Nichols wrote an autobiography, How Many Times Can I Die?. A biography entitled King of Spies was published in 2017 by Blaine Harden.

== Early life and service ==
Nichols was born on 18 February 1923 to Walter Isaac and Myra Stewart Nichols at 105 Main Street, Hackensack, New Jersey. He was the youngest of four sons. Nichols only completed elementary school before joining the military. He grew up poor in a welfare family, and occasionally had to resort to theft of neighbors' farm equipment to survive.

Nichols served in Pakistan early in his military career. He was a sergeant assigned to the motor pool before being detailed to Sub-detachment K, 607th Counter Intelligence Corps in South Korea in 1946. As a master sergeant, he rose to command the unit. He spoke Korean somewhat fluently. Nichols was burly in build, casual in dress, often out of uniform, and seldom displayed his rank. He was noted for his gruffness. He formed an extensive network of approximately 600 civilian spies throughout Korea. There was an assassination attempt on him by communists in 1948. Nichols survived; the would-be assassins did not.

In 1948, Nichols moved beyond the passivity of counter-intelligence and began intelligence/spy operations that could later be defined as positive intelligence. He began active collection of military intelligence; for the next two years, he briefed General Earle Partridge on possible North Korean communist actions.

In May 1950, Nichols enticed a communist pilot into defecting to the south, along with his IL-10 strike aircraft. As this was the first airplane of its kind to fall into American hands, Nichols disassembled it for removal to the U.S. In the meantime, he was warned of an impending attack by the North Koreans. Sergeant Nichols claimed that he predicted the beginning date of the Korean War to an accuracy within 3 days of its actual occurrence (June 25, 1950) in his last report on the subject, but his forecast was ignored.

== Korean War service ==
=== As the war began ===
After the North Koreans invaded at 0400 hours on 25 June 1950, Nichols telephoned the news to General Douglas MacArthur's headquarters at 0945. The newly-promoted chief warrant officer Nichols destroyed the IL-10 and other airplanes and equipment before fleeing Seoul, clinging to the side of a small boat.

When Nichols rejoined the battered United Nations formations, he bore a map with annotated targets of the invaders. He was asked by Ambassador John J. Muccio to temporarily serve as liaison to the Republic of Korea's military heads. In July 1950, Nichols was assigned to the United States Air Force Office of Special Investigations; this assignment was designed to grant him autonomy. General Partridge wanted one of the "new" Russian T-34 tanks the North Koreans were using. Air strikes against them had been unsuccessful, and the general was seeking information to plot counter-measures against the communist armor. Nichols scrounged up a tank transporter and retrieved a stranded T-34 while under fire. For this action, Partridge recommended, and the U.S. military awarded, Nichols a Silver Star.

Partridge mentioned communist guerrillas harassing Taegu Air Force Base and interrupting UN flight operations. Nichols led a band of 20 South Korean soldiers in a night-time raid into the hills, and returned with grenade fragments in his leg. The harassment ended.

Nichols established a makeshift jump school that would turn out spy teams that parachuted behind communist lines. When a planeload of trainees in his ad hoc training failed to jump, Nichols headed them back into the drop aircraft. Although he had never had parachute training, he led the queue of trainees out the aircraft door once they were over the drop zone; all his trainees followed.

Although air drops served to introduce espionage teams into the interior of North Korea, their only means of exit was on foot. Nichols also turned to amphibious insertions and retrievals, using the 22nd Crash Rescue Boat Squadron, and later, scrounged Korean fishing boats. The numerous islands offshore of North Korea served as sanctuaries for guerrillas who would host his teams.

=== 6004th Air Intelligence Service Squadron ===
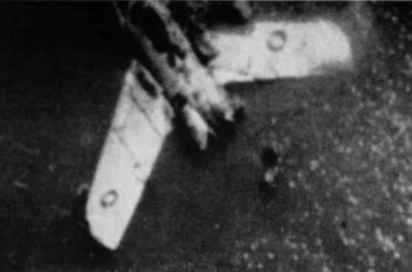
The MiG-15 salvaged by UN forces in July 1951

By March 1951, the Air Force decided to gather Nichols' ad hoc activities into "Special Activities Unit Number One". The new unit was officially given a wide brief that charged them with gathering military intelligence. They were directed to coordinate their activities with other intelligence agencies. The unit evolved into Detachment 2 of the 6004th Air Intelligence Service Squadron either later that month or the next. The unorthodox new unit contained commandos, scholars, linguists, and saboteurs along with its more usual intelligence specialists. Its strength was seven officers and 26 enlisted personnel; its official brief was to infiltrate behind communist lines and reconnoiter for air strike targets. Given the impossibility of Caucasians remaining undetected in the Asian populace of communist rear areas, there was a minimal need for Americans in this U.S. Air Force detachment.

Nichols' next intelligence coup came on 17 April 1951. The Chinese communists had introduced Mikoyan-Gurevich MiG-15s into the war. The United States desperately wanted one of the MiG-15s, so they could devise counter-measures against the most technologically advanced plane in communist possession. However, the MiG-15 had yet to fall into UN hands. Nichols and five technical intelligence experts flew to Baengnyeongdo. From there, they penetrated 80 miles (130 km) into communist territory in an unarmed helicopter through enemy ground fire. The intruders landed at a MiG-15 crash site some 100 miles (160 km) behind the lines and near an enemy supply depot. The intelligence team rapidly photographed the MiG-15 wreckage, and transcribed all instructions and markings. After scalping as many smaller parts as it could from the fighter, the team departed despite the chopper's battle damage to its rotor blade. They managed to struggle back to Baengnyeongdo. Nichols was awarded the Distinguished Service Cross for his valor and enterprise. The award citation stated that he had retrieved "information of inestimable value".

Between 14 and 21 July 1951, Nichols and his men managed to retrieve a crashed MiG-15 from behind enemy lines. The MiG-15 in question had crash-landed onto mud flats south-west of Hanch'on. The intelligence coup was considered so important that it was supported by a small multi-national fleet of South Korean, U.S., and British vessels under the command of British Rear Admiral A. K. Scott-Moncrieff. Despite his relatively junior rank, Nichols was credited with organizing the operation.

In 1953, Major Nichols was once again targeted by enemy agents, but again escaped fatality, unlike the unsuccessful killers. Nichols is credited by some anonymous sources in the intelligence community with originating Operation Moolah; this operation offered $50,000US to any defecting pilot for his fighter. Nichols was the first to debrief No Kum-sok (the pilot who defected from the North Korean air forces with a completely intact and functional MiG-15) and he was the first to submit an intelligence report based on interrogating the defector.

== Postwar career ==
In September 1953, after the fighting ceased, Nichols' 6004th Air Intelligence Service Squadron was dubbed the "primary military intelligence collection agency of the Far East Air Force (FEAF)". Despite the fact that the Air Force effort was as large as the CIA and Naval intelligence units in Korea, the relatively junior Nichols remained entrusted with command. However, throughout the war, agent casualties had steadily climbed as the communists increased their security measures. From the end of 1952 onwards, insertions into the north had become virtual suicide missions. Nichols was haunted by the situation: "I hate to call myself a man. I had to be the one to give the orders when I knew someone was going to be killed."

== See also ==
- Korean War
- 6004th Air Intelligence Service Squadron
- Air Force Office of Special Investigations (AFOSI)
