= DCITA =

DCITA may refer to:

- Defense Cyber Investigations Training Academy
- Department of Communications, Information Technology and the Arts
