= 22nd Crash Rescue Boat Squadron =

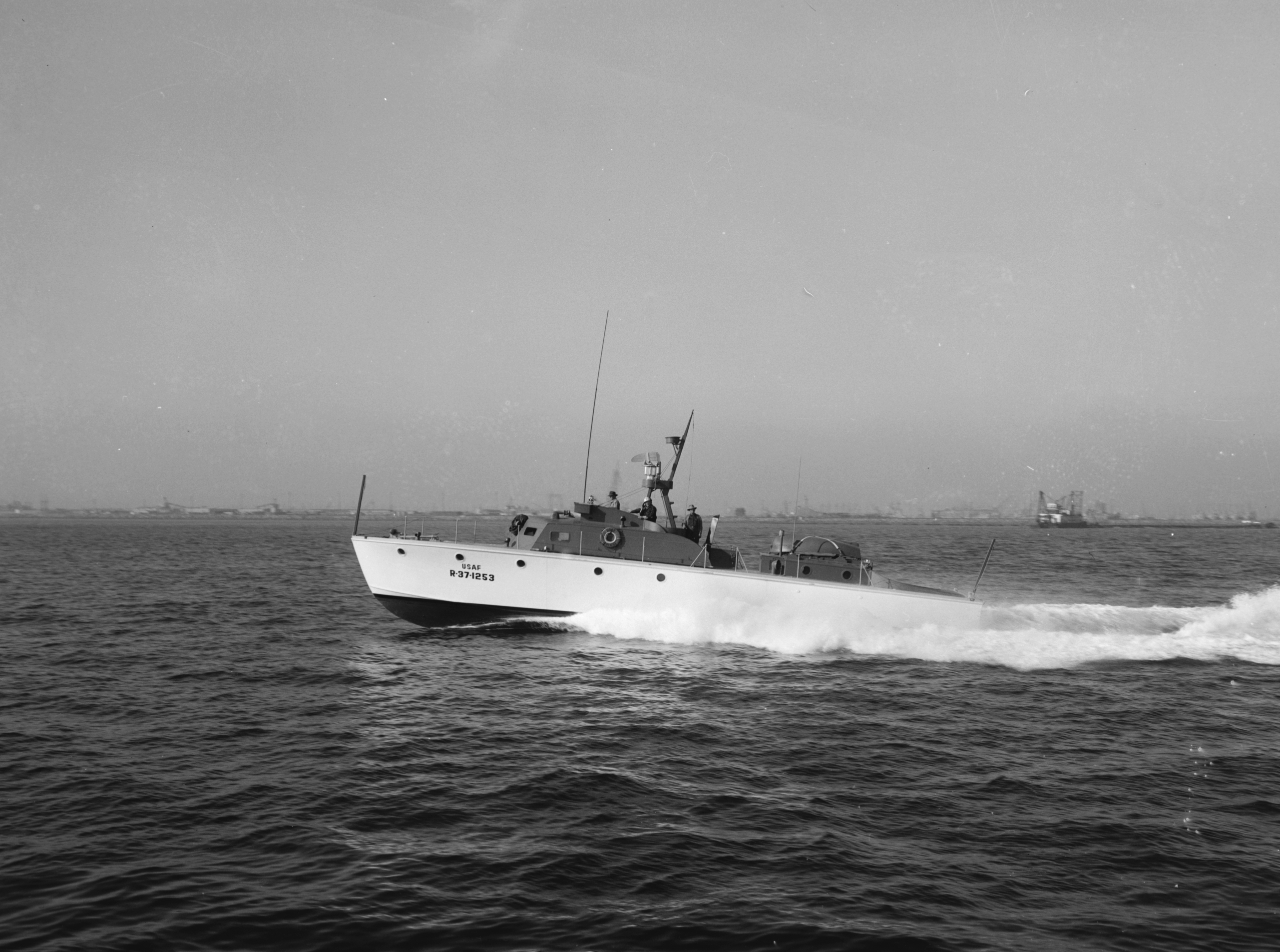
- A U.S. Air Force 63-foot (19.20 m) Mark II crash rescue boat in peacetime trim
- Active: 1950–1953
- Country: United States
- Branch: United States Air Force
- Type: Combat search and rescue
- Garrison/HQ: Itazuke Air Base, Fukuoka, Japan
- Engagements: Korean War

The 22nd Crash Rescue Boat Squadron (22nd CRBS) was a U.S. Air Force combat search and rescue unit formed during the Korean War. While its original task was ocean rescue of downed pilots, its speedy and well-armed boats soon became prime vehicles for inserting spies, espionage agents, and sabotage parties into enemy territory for the 6004th Air Intelligence Service Squadron. Despite the hazards of both their overt and covert missions, the airmen of the 22nd CRBS never lost a boat during their clandestine operations in the war.

== Precedents and foundation ==
The peninsular Korean War began at 0400 hours on 25 June 1950 when North Koreans invaded South Korea, quickly brought crash rescue boats back out of storage as a wartime expedient for combat search and rescue operations. The 6160th Air Base Group activated a boat section as Detachment 1; it comprised a lieutenant and four enlisted men with a 114-foot FP-47 cutter. Detachment 1 rapidly acquired a cadre of 85 personnel to man a 104-foot boat, eight 85-footers, and seven 63-footers in addition to the original FP-47. Its initial commander was First Lieutenant Phil Dickey. With the backing of influential senior officers, he set out to gather all crash rescue boats and their experienced handlers into the new unit.

In July 1952, at Itazuke Air Base, the detachment was formed into the 22nd Crash Rescue Boat Squadron. It had grown to include 31 officers and 232 airmen sailors, and included all in-theater crash boat personnel. Its strength would eventually rise to over 400 men, including USAF and US Army personnel. 5th Air Force Headquarters took direct charge of the unit, leaving only administrative details to the 6160th. This makeshift arrangement led to the unit's crewmen being harassed for their unmilitary appearance and unorthodox boat repairs even as they were ill supplied with all the necessities for their tasks.

== Equipment ==
The unarmored wooden crash boats mounted M45 Quadmount .50 caliber machine guns as the main armament, and a single .50 caliber M2 Browning machine gun both port and starboard, as well as on the stern. The larger 85-foot R-2s may have also mounted a 20mm on the stern. The speed was needed to fetch pilots from the frigid ocean before they died of hypothermia. The guns would be handy for combat search and rescue, as well as other missions. The U.S. Air Force sailors' 85 ft. crash rescue boats were powered by twin Packard 4M-2500 marine engines, giving them over 3,000 horsepower and a high speed, over 40 knots. Mission range could stretch from 200 to 400 miles. A mother ship sometimes resupplied the crash boats so they could extend their patrols in communist waters.

== Personnel ==
The master of the boat was usually ranked as an E-5 or E-6. His crew of seven to nine subordinates included a medic, radio operator, engine man, and cook. The latter had alcohol stoves available, but no refrigeration. Fresh water was hand pumped, and limited to 500 gallons on the 63-foot R-1 boats, with some of that needed for the engines' cooling systems. The unbathed unshaven crew had little or no heat in the boats.

While a month's sea duty was considered the maximum, crew members often spent twice that time afloat without a break. Casualties were incurred via poor diet, illness, and exposure, as well as communist actions.

== Boats assigned ==
This list is incomplete.

- 114-foot PCF 47
- Crash Rescue Boat serial number R-1-664
- Crash Rescue Boat serial number R-2-1164
- Crash Rescue Boat s/n R-1-676-DPUO
- Utility Motor Boat s/n U-52-1197
- Crash Rescue Boat s/n R-1-667
- Crash Rescue Boat R-1-654
- Crash Rescue Boat U-9-890
- Crash Rescue Boat R-37A-1333

== Bases ==
The boats and crews were dispersed to stations in Korea at Pusan, Pohang, Chinhae, and Kunsan. They were also located on Guam, Okinawa, and Japan. While crewmen kept their Air Force ranks, they used naval ratings as their work assignments. Typically, the 22nd had little contact with the rest of the USAF, and were largely left to their own devices. Noncommissioned officers, not officers, commanded the boats. The headquarters of the Air Force's navy was a Quonset hut mounted on a steel barge in Kunsan Harbor. The boats and their crews rotated to Japan for maintenance and repair—sometimes of battle damage from inshore firefights or deep water brushes with North Korean patrol boats.

== Operations ==
Korean waters offered stiff challenges to the crash rescue boats. The sea was not only freezing cold, with floating ice; the rise and fall of Korea's 30-foot tides are among the greatest in the world. The weather was no more hospitable, sometimes hitting minus 30 degrees Fahrenheit.

With near-daily overwater bailouts of United Nations pilots taking place off the North Korean coast, the USAF found it necessary to station four 85-foot boats in those waters to rescue them. Sometimes the rescue boatmen had to pick up the fallen from close inshore, or from the coast. For instance, on 8 September 1951, Crash Rescue Boat R-1-676 sidled up to the sandbar blocking the mouth of the Taedong River near Nampo to pick up a downed pilot. While picking up the pilot and two rescuing crew members of the boat, they came under artillery fire despite the overwatch of the Dutch destroyer, HNLMS Evertsen. The rescue was successful. One wounded crewman received the Purple Heart, but other medal awards were refused. However, such exploits brought them an added assignment.

The crash rescue unit was soon involved in more than rescue missions. Since there were no alternative vessels available, the crash rescue boats became engaged in covert operations involving the friendly guerrillas on the islands scattered off both the east and west coast of Korea. Boats and crews were lent on temporary duty to Donald Nichols and his Detachment 2 of the 6004th Air Intelligence Service Squadron a month at a time. The Air Force sailors roved north of the 38th Parallel in the dark to insert Korean Marines or guerrillas into mainland North Korea to conduct attacks behind communist lines.

The scanty official records show that between 16 November 1951 and 10 January 1952, Crash Rescue Boat R-1-667 inserted espionage agents into Port Arthur, Manchuria, as well as on the Chinese shore of the Yalu River. During November, one of these agents was noted to be a blond blue-eyed Caucasian who failed to be exfiltrated.

In April 1952, Far East Command ordered crash rescue boat commanders to provoke bank robberies in North Korea, both for the communist currency and for general economic sabotage. Some of the agents being infiltrated into North Korea also passed counterfeit currency to disrupt the communists' economy. In October, a North Korean junk infiltrated one of the 22nd's main bases, at Chodo Island, but was repelled with the loss of two prisoners left behind.

In March 1953, Boat R-1-664 inserted a team of five agents near the MiG-15 base of Antung, China. Again the exfiltration was unsuccessful.

By war's end, despite the hazards of infiltrations behind enemy lines into North Korean and China, the 22nd Crash Rescue Boat Squadron had lost no boats. Its last reported activities were in August 1953.

== See also ==
- Seenotdienst (World War II Luftwaffe organisation that operated fast motor life boats)
- PT boat
- Motor launch
- For Those in Peril – 1944 British film that is based on the RAF air-sea rescue service featuring Type Two craft.
- The Sea Shall Not Have Them
