= 6004th Air Intelligence Service Squadron =

United States military unit

The 6004th Air Intelligence Service Squadron was "the first covert (military intelligence) collection agency in the history of the United States Air Force". Begun by Major Donald Nichols as an impromptu extension of his pre-Korean War espionage in 1950, it was first dubbed "Special Activities Unit Number One". In April or May 1951, it officially became the 6004th Air Intelligence Service Squadron. The 6004th was an unorthodox unit that engaged in espionage and aircrew escape and evasion, as well as collecting information. It was Far East Air Force's primary supplier of intelligence for the war, generating as many as 900 reports per month.

== Preceding activities ==
The origin of the 6004th Air Intelligence Service Squadron lies in the confusion following the start of the Korean War on 25 June 1950. When the North Koreans invaded South Korea, the United States Air Force had no military intelligence units. To fill the need for what he deemed "positive intelligence", Chief Warrant Officer (later Major) Donald Nichols improvised spy and espionage operations within the agent net he had formed prewar.

In July 1950, Nichols set up an impromptu parachute training course so espionage agents could be dropped behind the communist enemy's front lines. Some of them would shortly thereafter parachute behind North Korean lines to rescue the crew of a downed B-29 Superfortress. Forty-eight others would form the 13 spy teams dropped behind enemy lines during this time; they spotted and reported rear area targets for the Air Force.

Although the 6004th could draw upon air assets from the 581st Air Supply and Communications Wing or the Special Air Missions Detachment of the 21st Troop Carrier Squadron for infiltrating agents into North Korea's interior, exfiltration was by foot. This drawback would be addressed by beginning seaborne infiltrations via the 22nd Crash Rescue Boat Squadron, or scrounged fishing boats. Numerous islands lying just off the North Korean coast sheltered UN-backed guerrillas and offered sanctuary to seaborne infiltration missions, as well as refuge for downed UN pilots. The North Korean lines of communication running down either peninsular coast were tempting targets for sabotage. The North Koreans sometimes raided the islands, and were even known to wipe out guerrillas they found, but to no avail.

In March 1951, the Air Force decided to gather Nichol's ad hoc activities into "Special Activities Unit Number One". The new unit was envisioned as consisting of three detachments reporting to Fifth Air Force headquarters:

- Detachment 1: To gather technical military intelligence concerning operations of enemy forces, and to conduct Prisoner of War interrogations.
- Detachment 2: To provide an "unusual" top secret effort to gather and distribute intelligence.
- Detachment 3: Tasked with developing an escape and evasion program to recover downed UN aircrew members from behind communist lines.

Detachment 1 already existed under Nichols. Detachments 2 and 3 would be founded a bit later.

== Foundation and operations ==
The new unit was directed to coordinate activities with other intelligence agencies such as Combined Command Reconnaissance Activities, Korea. It was the first covert intelligence unit in the Air Force. Given Nicols' bent for "positive intelligence" the proactive unorthodox new squadron contained commandos, scholars, linguists, spies, and saboteurs along with its intelligence specialists. It evolved into the 6004th Air Intelligence Service Squadron on 19 May 1951.

On 17 April 1951, a technical team of five led by commanding officer Donald Nichols staged a daring raid into the enemy's rear to gather aeronautical specifications and some gear from a crashed MiG-15. This supplied the Air Force with its first data on the advanced swept-wing fighter that threatened UN air supremacy.

On 1 June 1951, in violation of their mandated operational role, Detachment 1 of the 6004th was ordered to drop 15 saboteurs behind enemy lines to destroy a pair of railroad bridges. The entire team was captured by Chinese communist volunteers. After this failure, Detachment 1 was left to its required tasks of standard intelligence operations and prisoner of war interrogations.

On 25 July 1951, the new squadron was divided into two equal detachments. Nichols founded Detachment 2, with an American strength of seven officers and 26 enlisted. Its brief was to infiltrate behind communist lines and personally reconnoiter for air strike targets. Given the impossibility of Caucasians remaining undetected in the Asian populace of communist rear areas, there was a minimal need for Americans in this U.S. Air Force detachment. However, now that the fighting had settled into trench warfare, the communists began increasing security in their rear areas.

Also in July 1951, the squadron actually managed to retrieve a crashed MiG-15 from behind enemy lines. The communist jet fighter had splashed onto mud flats behind enemy lines, northwest of Pyongyang. Backed by a small UN fleet, including LSU-960 which mounted a crane, the MiG was plucked from its muddy bower. British and American fighters supplied air cover for the event.

In January 1952, after repeated requests, a confidential fund of 30,000,000 won per month was established for the squadron's intelligence needs. By this time, Americans made up only 5.7% of the detachment's 665 personnel. Korean civilians made up 72.3% of the detachment's strength, with the remainder being Korean Air Force troops. By July 1952, the American head count totaled 58; the other 900 members of the Detachment were Korean. By this time, the squadron had 23 espionage teams working in the communist rear areas, increasing the difficulty of the squadron's tasks. A typical team would have one American adviser to the Korean commanding officer. One difficulty of this position carrying an officer's responsibilities was that it was often filled by an enlisted airman. One unusual difficulty was that the agents on the teams would rather fight than spy after insertion.

By the spring of 1952, the 6004th was heavily involved in supporting the South Korean guerrilla forces dispersed on offshore islands off both coasts of North Korea. Major Nichols requested 14 boats of varying sizes be supplied to the unit. The squadron became desperate enough for watercraft that an officer was tasked with finding sunken vessels to salvage for the unit's use.

On 10 July 1952, Fifth Air Force activated its Air Targets Division. The 6004th would be the primary contributor to the target data base. The squadron was generating 600 to 900 intelligence reports per month.

By August 1952, Detachment 2 had five shallow water Korean fishing boats operational among the North Korean offshore islands. It was a prescient move, as by the end of 1952, airborne insertions had become virtual suicide missions. By that time, the Detachment 2 fleet had swelled to 30 vessels of all sizes and purposes. By now, it included three Japanese fishing boats acquired through military channels, as well as the salvaged and scrounged craft.

On 6 August, Detachment 3 was activated. Detachment 3 formed an escape and evasion (E&E) network. They experimented with flying pickups of agents by Douglas C-47s using the McGuire rig. However, Detachment 3's effort was hampered by lack of radios with the Air Force's aircraft emergency frequency and bureaucratically blocked by the CIA's primacy in E&E.

In the latter part of 1952, the squadron's mission had stabilized enough that official courses in interrogation, intelligence gathering, and parachute usage were established. One of the causes for the late start in schooling were the casualties suffered increasingly often among infiltrated agents. However, by year's end, there were 32 espionage teams operating in North Korea.

== After the armistice ==
In September 1953, after the fighting ceased, the 6004th Air Intelligence Service Squadron was dubbed the "primary [military intelligence] collection agency of FEAF [Far East Air Force]". It had grown into such an effective unit, FEAF had to ward off power grabs when the CIA's Joint Activities Commission Korea and Combined Command Reconnaissance Activities, Korea tried to shanghai it. However, by the time the armistice came into effect, the 6004th's input was greatly diminished by ever increasing agent casualties.
