= As Sayliyah Army Base =

Former United States military base in Qatar

Coordinates: 25.188399°N 51.413527°E

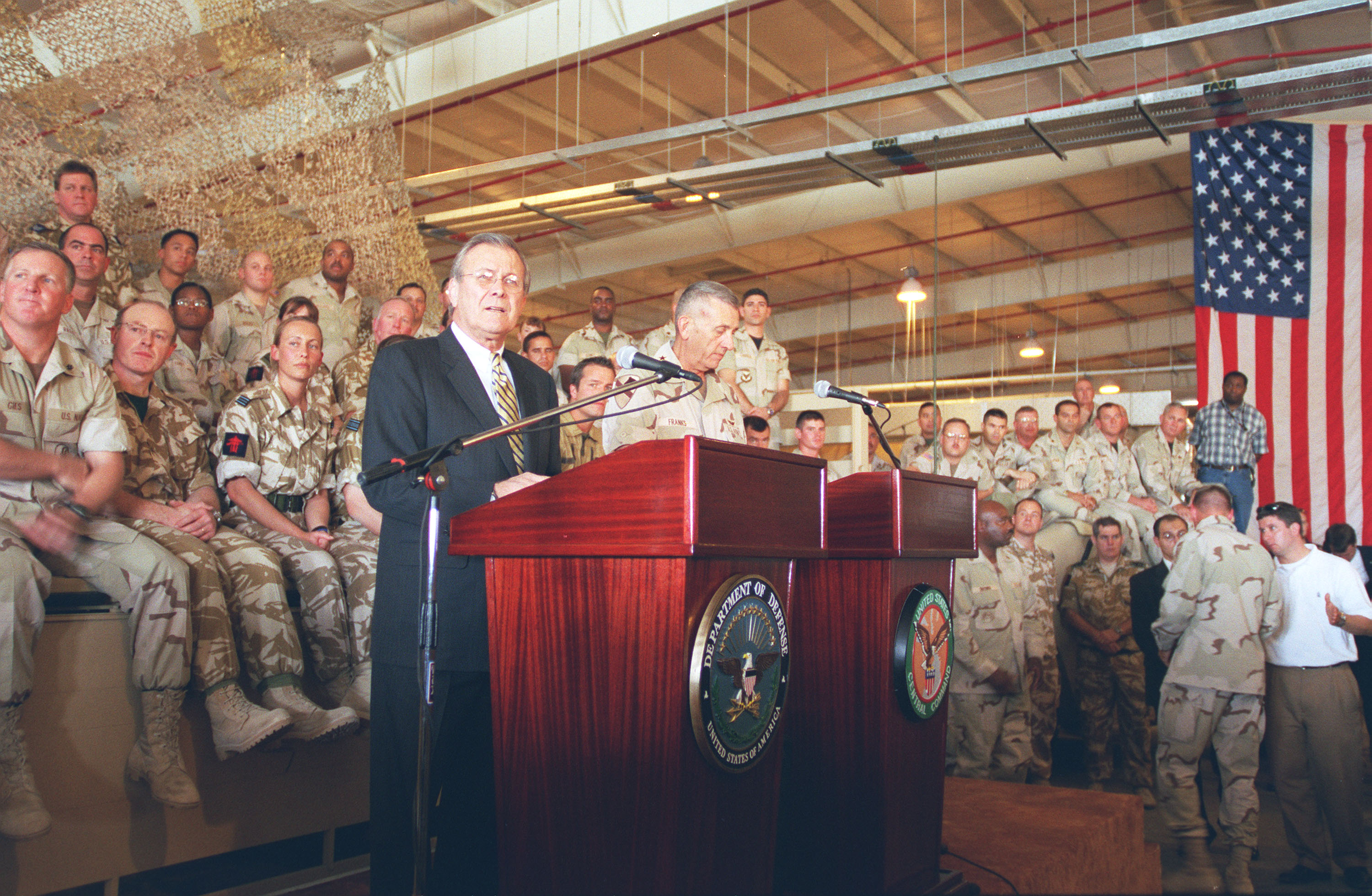
US Secretary of Defense Donald Rumsfeld during a town meeting at Al Sayliyah Army Base in 2002

Al Sayliyah Army Base (Arabic: قاعدة السيلية العسكرية) or Camp Al Sayliyah was a United States Army base in Al Sailiya, a suburb outside Doha, Qatar. U.S. Central Command used it to preposition material bound for Iraq and Afghanistan. It was the largest U.S. Army prepositioning site in the world, capable of storing enough equipment for a U.S. Army armored brigade: more than 150 M-1 Abrams tanks, 116 Bradley fighting vehicles, and 112 other armored personnel carriers. It was established in 2000, and closed in June 2021 when its mission was moved to Area Support Group-Jordan.

In 2023, it is being used as a way station or "lily pad" for housing Afghans who have been evacuated by the US Government. This mission continues under the leadership of the US Department of State following the Army's departure.

In late April 2026 some 1,100 Afghan refugees being held at the base said they were being forced to choose between returning to Afghanistan or being sent to the Democratic Republic of Congo (DRC) under an agreement reached after a US $50 million donation to the UN High Commission for Refugees (UNHCR). US officials denied any decisions had been made and called their "voluntary resettlement opportunities" a "positive resolution" for their safety. According to UNHCR estimates the number of displaced people in the DRC could reach 8 million by the end of 2026.
