= Air Force Office of Special Investigations =

United States federal law enforcement agency

Office of Special Investigations
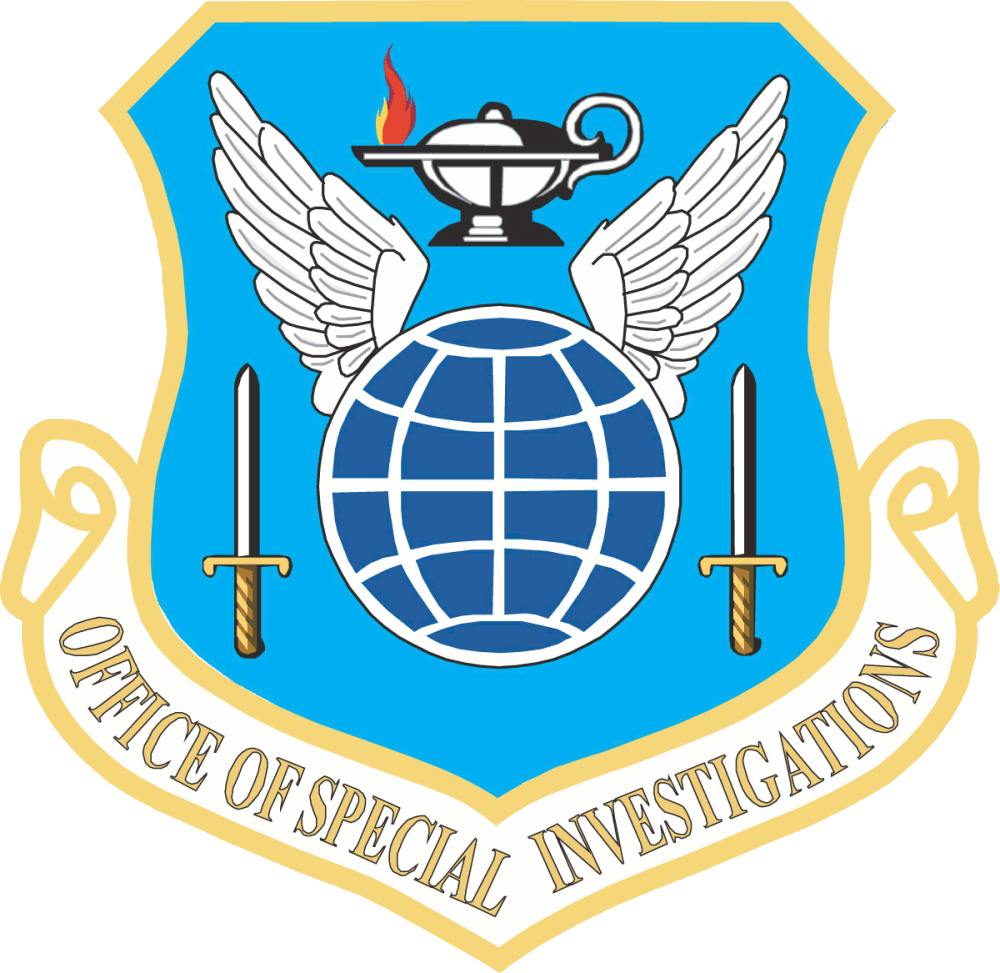
- Office of Special Investigations emblem

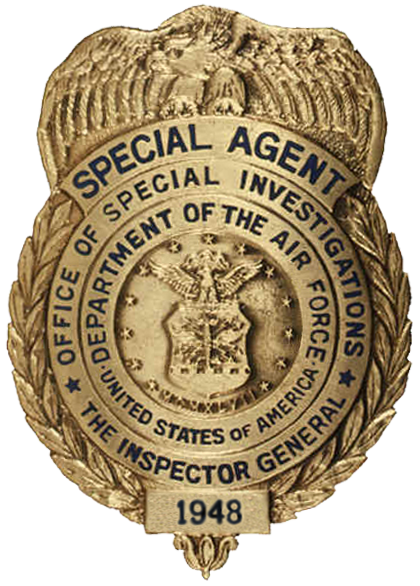
- Office of Special Investigations special agent badge
- Abbreviation: OSI

Agency overview
- Formed: 1 August 1948

Jurisdictional structure
- Federal agency: United States
- Operations jurisdiction: United States
- General nature: Federal law enforcement; Military provost

Operational structure
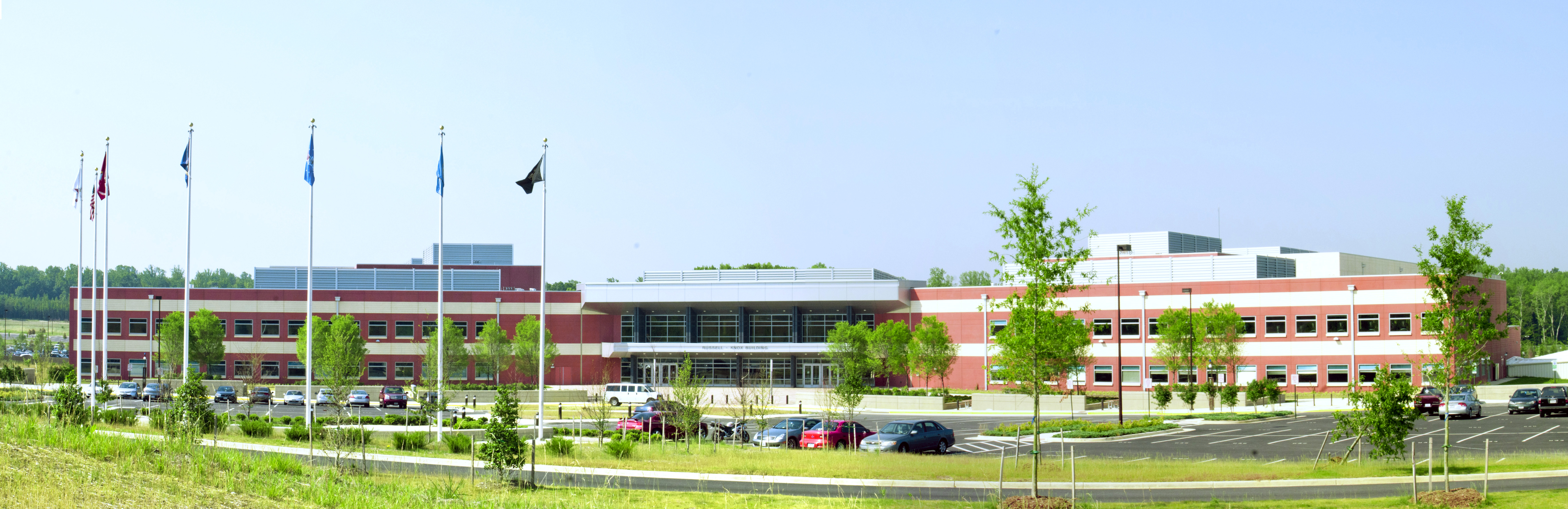
- Headquarters: Russell-Knox Building, Marine Corps Base Quantico, VA
- Special Agents: 2,000
- Unsworn members: 1,000
- Agency executives: Brig. Gen. Laura DeJong, Commander; Col. Brian Stelma, Deputy Commander; Mrs. Pearl Mundt, Executive Director; CMSgt James Hoy, Command Chief
- Parent agency: Department of the Air Force
- Units: Several: Regions 1 - 8, Field Support Squadron, Procurement Fraud, Special Investigations Academy, Special Projects, and Investigations, Collections, Operations Nexus (ICON) Center
- Regions: 7

Website
- www.osi.af.mil

The Air Force Office of Special Investigations (OSI or AFOSI) is a U.S. federal law enforcement agency that reports directly to the secretary of the Air Force. OSI is also a U.S. Air Force field operating agency under the administrative guidance and oversight of the inspector general of the Department of the Air Force. By federal statute, OSI provides independent criminal investigative, counterintelligence and protective service operations worldwide and outside of the traditional military chain of command. Proactively, OSI identifies, investigates, and neutralizes serious criminal, terrorist, and espionage threats to personnel and resources of the Air Force, Space Force, and the U.S. Department of Defense, with a goal of protecting the national security of the United States.

== Overview ==
The Office of Special Investigations capabilities:

- Protect critical technologies and information
- Detect and mitigate threats
- Provide global specialized services
- Conduct major criminal investigations
- Engage foreign adversaries and threats offensively

OSI's Cornerstone is to "vigorously solve crime, protect secrets, warn of threats, exploit intelligence opportunities, and operate in cyber." OSI investigates a wide variety of offenses – espionage, terrorism, crimes against property, violence against people, larceny, computer hacking, acquisition fraud, drug use and distribution, financial misdeeds, military desertion, corruption of the contracting process, and any other illegal activity that undermines the mission of the Air Force, Space Force, or the DoD.

As of 2007, OSI had 2,900 employees. After pilot training, OSI remains the second-most requested career choice in the Air Force for officers.

== History ==
The Office of Special Investigations was founded in 1948 at the suggestion of Congress to consolidate investigative activities in the Air Force. Secretary of the Air Force Stuart Symington created OSI as a Field Operating Agency and patterned it after the Federal Bureau of Investigation (FBI). He appointed Special Agent Joseph Francis Carroll, a senior FBI official and assistant to FBI director J. Edgar Hoover, as the first commander of OSI and charged him with providing independent, unbiased and centrally directed investigations of criminal activity in the Air Force. Carroll later became the first director of the Defense Intelligence Agency.

The Office of Special Investigations was officially established by Chief of Staff of the United States Air Force Carl Spaatz General Order No.1 of 2 January 1948. This same Order had appointed Joseph Francis Carroll as OSI commander. The official letter of Carl Spaatz of 9 April 1948 set forth the functions and responsibilities of the Office of Special Investigations, which were "to provide a competent, centrally directed special investigations service to all Air Force activities", including the investigation of such major offenses as "fraud and/or conspiracy, arson, black-market operations, bribery, burglary, embezzlement, forgery, larceny, perjury, robbery, smuggling, and similar offenses ... and other major violations of the Articles of War, Federal Statute, and/or other pertinent directives".

A new Chief of Staff of the United States Air Force Hoyt Vandenberg signed the General Order No.29 of 15 July 1948 that empowered the Office of Special Investigations to carry out the counterintelligence activity including the detection of espionage, sabotage, treason, sedition, subversion, disloyalty, and disaffection. Also it was specifically stated that OSI would be responsible for all investigations formerly performed by the USAF Counterintelligence Corps.

1 August 1948 is considered the operational date of the Office of Special Investigations.

== An Evolving Service Modeled on the FBI ==
After becoming a separate service in 1947, the Air Force sought a single investigative branch. Founded in 1948, the new Office of Special Investigations (OSI) united a number of security-related groups. Organized similarly to the FBI, OSI's first director was a veteran FBI agent.

OSI has grown with the USAF, but its independent nature is unchanged. Though OSI is organized in alignment with USAF major commands and deploys regularly with other troops, OSI personnel operate outside the local chain of command by reporting directly to the Air Force Inspector General in Washington, D.C.. OSI agents work mainly in civilian clothes to keep rank and authority separate from investigative duties. OSI investigators are federal special agents and carry badges. Their initial training is conducted alongside personnel from various federal agencies, and OSI's special agents include civilians, officers and enlisted Air Force members.

== Organization ==
Under the leadership of Brigadier General Francis Dillon, the command underwent a massive reorganization which transformed the agency from a geographically based organization with District field offices to one primarily realigned as Regions based on the needs of the Air Force's major commands.

The reorganization effort began in September 1991 by restructuring OSI headquarters. In mid-July 1992, a special order was issued, which authorized the deactivation of district offices and subordinate detachments, while simultaneously activated the field investigations region headquarters and subordinate detachments that exist today.

Those changes were official October 1, 1992, and on that date, OSI was also reorganized from an organization with 16 district offices to an organization with 7 field investigations regions. In addition to the AFOSI headquarters at Quantico, Virginia, OSI has seven field investigations regions aligned with Air Force major commands and the Unified combatant commands

- Region 1 with Air Force Materiel Command, Air Force Special Operations Command, Air Force Reserve Command
- Region 2 with Air Combat Command, United States Central Command, United States Southern Command, United States Strategic Command, 12th Air Force, 16th Air Force
- Region 3 with Air Mobility Command, United States Transportation Command, United States Special Operations Command, United States Central Command, Air Force District of Washington, Pentagon Force Protection Agency
- Region 4 with Air Education and Training Command, 2nd Air Force, 19th Air Force, Air University
- Region 5 with United States Air Forces in Europe – Air Forces Africa, United States Africa Command, United States European Command, 3rd Air Force
- Region 6 with Pacific Air Forces, United States Indo-Pacific Command, Special Operations Command Pacific, 5th Air Force, 7th Air Force, 11th Air Force
- Region 8 with United States Space Force, Air Force Global Strike Command, United States Northern Command, 8th Air Force, 14th Air Force, 20th Air Force, United States Air Force Academy

The single region not aligned with a major command is Region 7, the mission of which is to provide counterintelligence and security-program management for special-access programs under the Office of the Secretary of the Air Force.

In addition, OSI has several specialized investigative, training, or supporting units:

- Office of Special Projects (PJ)
- Office of Procurement Fraud (PF)
- Force Support Squadron (FSS)
- U.S. Air Force Special Investigations Academy (USAFSIA)
- Investigations, Collections, Operations Nexus (ICON) Center

AFOSI is the designated executive agency for the Department of Defense Cyber Crime Center.

While the regions serve the investigative needs of those aligned major commands, all AFOSI units and personnel remain independent of those commands. In the OSI chains of command, each region is directly under the OSI headquarters. Such organizational independence is intended to ensure unbiased investigations.

At the regional level are subordinate units called field investigations squadrons, detachments, and operating locations. There are more than 255 AFOSI units worldwide including, Jordan, Saudi Arabia, Yemen, Iraq and other Middle East locations.

Antiterrorism Specialty Team (AST) members have played a key role in Operations ALLIED FORCE, ENDURING FREEDOM and IRAQI FREEDOM. The first female OSI agent to deploy in a combat zone was a member of the AST, and currently several AST and other OSI agents continue to provide CI support for any ongoing operations.

== Operations ==
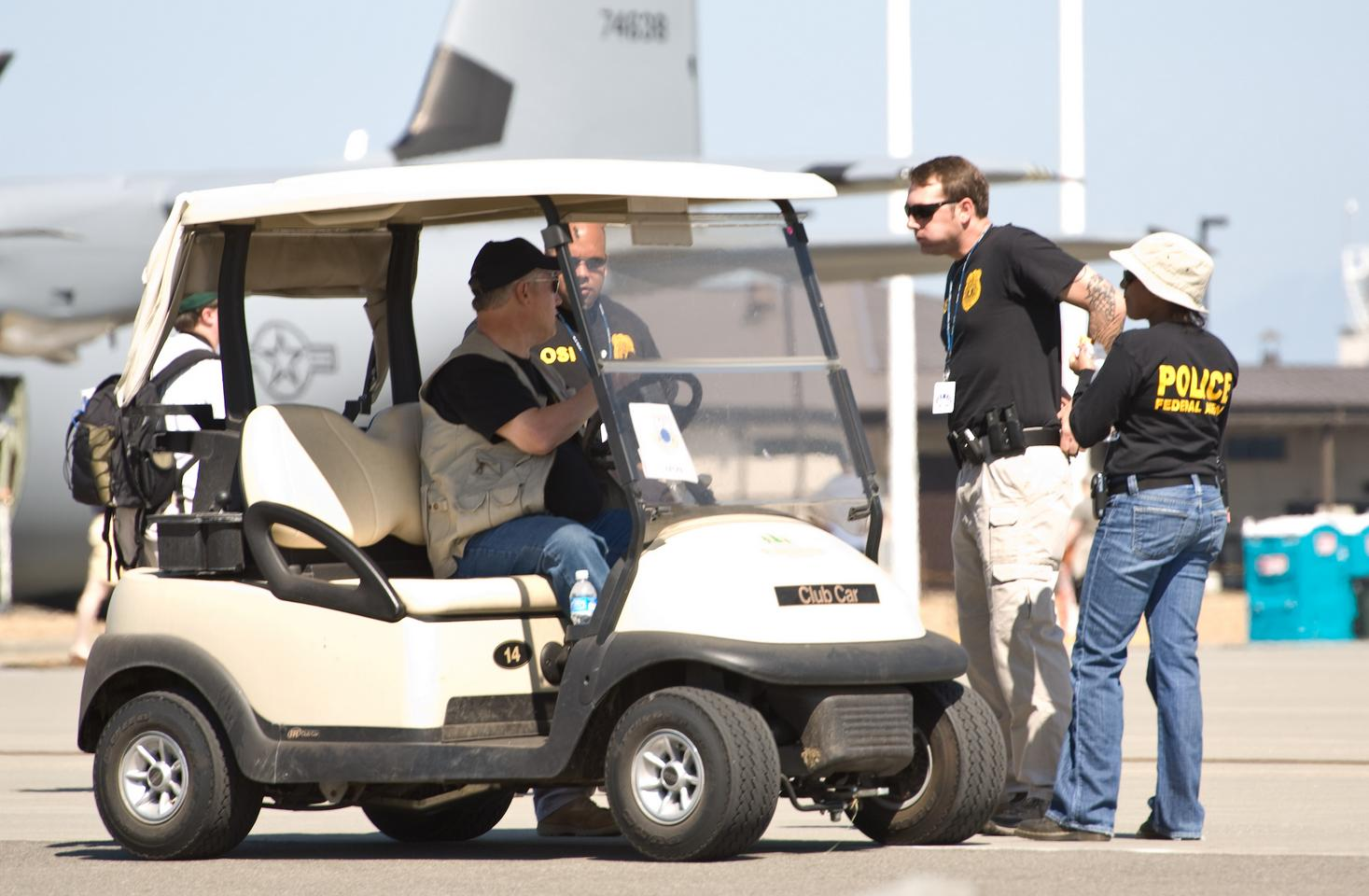
Several OSI agents at a U.S. Air Force base.

Threat detection

OSI manages offensive and defensive activities to detect, counter and destroy the effectiveness of hostile intelligence services and terrorist groups that target the Air Force and Space Force. These efforts include investigating the crimes of espionage, terrorism, technology transfer and computer infiltration. This mission aspect also includes providing personal protection to senior Air Force and Space Force leaders and other officials, as well as supervising an extensive antiterrorism program in geographic areas of heightened terrorist activity.

Criminal investigations

The vast majority of OSI's investigative activities pertain to felony crimes including murder, robbery, rape, assault, major burglaries, drug use and trafficking, sex offenses, arson, black market activities, and other serious criminal activities. In January 2014, while investigating synthetic drugs abuse, OSI uncovered the facts of cheating on monthly proficiency exams at the 341st Missile Wing at Malmstrom Air Force Base in Montana involving 79 officers.

Economic crime investigations

A significant amount of OSI investigative resources are assigned to fraud (or economic crime) investigations. These include violations of the public trust involving Air Force and Space Force contracting matters, appropriated and nonappropriated funds activities, computer systems, pay and allowance matters, environmental matters, acquiring and disposing of Air Force and Space Force property, and major administrative irregularities. OSI uses fraud surveys to determine the existence, location and extent of fraud in Air Force and Space Force operations or programs. It also provides briefings to base and command-level resource managers to help identify and prevent fraud involving Air Force, Space Force, or Department of Defense (DoD) resources.

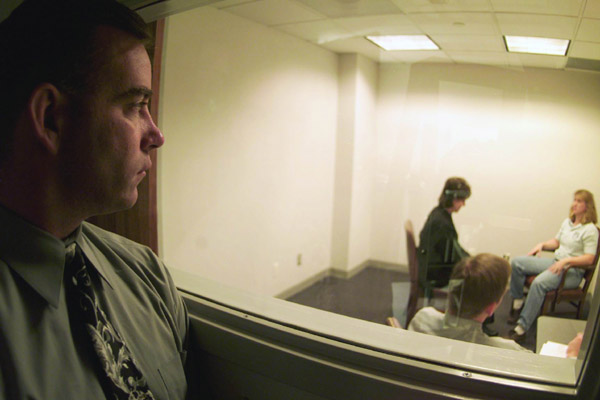
An OSI interview

Information operations

The Air Force and Space Force counters global security threat to information systems by recognizing future threats to the Air Force and Space Force and how to respond to these threats in cyberspace. OSI's support to information operations comes in many forms. OSI's computer crime investigators provide rapid worldwide response to intrusions into Air Force and Space Force systems.

Technology protection

The OSI Research and Technology Protection Program provides counterintelligence and core mission investigative services to safeguard Air Force and Space Force technologies, programs, critical program information, personnel and facilities.

Specialized services

OSI has numerous specialists to assist in investigations, including technical specialists, polygraphers, behavioral scientists, computer experts and forensic advisers.

Department of Defense Cyber Crime Center

The Department of Defense Cyber Crime Center (DC3) was established as an organic entity within OSI in 1998. The formation of the DC3 expanded the operational scope of the OSI Computer Forensic Lab, established in 1995 as the first of its kind within the DoD. DC3 provides digital and multimedia forensics, cyber investigative training, research, development, test and evaluation, and cyber analytics for the following DoD mission areas: information assurance and critical infrastructure protection, law enforcement and counterintelligence, document and media exploitation, and counterterrorism. DC3 is a national cyber center and serves as the operational focal point for the Defense Industrial Base Cybersecurity and Information Assurance Program (DIB CS/IA Program).

Force Protection Detachment Program

OSI personnel assigned to Force Protection Detachment Programs(FPD) work closely with host nation security and intelligence services to identify and mitigate terrorist threats, and are fully-integrated with the Department of State Country Team within the embassy. FPD agents leverage counterintelligence / AT expertise, language skills, and a deep understanding of cross-cutting international dynamics, to safeguard DoD resources abroad.

Antiterrorism Specialty Team

Created out of a need to meet the increasing challenges presented by worldwide terrorism, AFOSI antiterrorism teams are maintained around the globe. They provide antiterrorism, counterintelligence information collections and investigative services to Air Force personnel and units globally. Today's Antiterrorism Specialty Team(AST) executes counterintelligence, counterterrorism and force protection operations in support of contingency requirements.

== AFOSI and Operation Urgent Fury ==
Operation Urgent Fury marked the largest American military action since the end of the Vietnam War in 1975, and for most of the AFOSI personnel who participated it marked their first combat-related deployment ever. During the operation, a total of 28 AFOSI personnel deployed to locations that included Grenada, Puerto Rico, Barbados, Antigua, Florida and North Carolina.

Some AFOSI personnel deployed on little as a 24-hour notice, many without the ability to tell their families exactly where they were going due to the fact that they were not immediately aware. Others deployed without the approved battle dress uniforms, having to borrow those from military members at the stateside bases where they worked.

Arriving in country with no transportation and no communication tools, they acquired vehicles and radios. Some of these resources were obtained through the AFOSI chain of command back in the U.S., while many of the resources were garnered locally through military channels or on the ground, such as by salvaging parts from inoperable vehicles and communications equipment.

The mission was successful.

Once combat operations began, Headquarters AFOSI, Operating Location-G was established in a command post that was adjacent to the U.S. Embassy in St. George. The primary job of Special Agents deploying to Grenada was to provide tactical counterintelligence support to the various Air Force elements involved in the operation. During Operation Urgent Fury, Air Force aircraft and personnel conducted a wide range of missions, including reconnaissance, close air support, troop and cargo delivery, casualty and evacuee transportation, air refueling, psychological warfare, communications and air traffic control.

Special Agents established an area source network with local business and community leaders in country, conducted surveys of airports, hotels, restaurants, shopping areas and shipping and port facilities across the island, and collected and reported information on potential threats. Special Agents coordinated their collection and information sharing efforts regularly with Air Force Security Police, Army Military Intelligence and Central Intelligence Agency officers.

The Air Force is dependent upon an airbase as its primary operating location. Throughout the region, Special Agents provided multiple daily briefings to on-scene Air Force and ground defense commanders and other senior military leaders keeping them informed of real-time conditions. Administrative support personnel who deployed to Grenada supported operations by establishing files, preparing and releasing messages, operating communications equipment, and securing equipment and vehicles for Special Agent use in the field.

The combat phase of Operation Urgent Fury was completed on Nov. 2. AFOSI personnel remained in country until Dec. 15. AFOSI operations in Grenada lasted for 50 days, with an overall total of eight Special Agents and four administrative support personnel deployed to the island at one time or another. With the departure of the last AFOSI personnel from Grenada, Headquarters AFOSI, Operating Location-G was inactivated. By the conclusion of operations, Air Force aircraft safely returned more than 6,000 military personnel to home stations and transported more than 700 American medical students and other American citizens to the United States, all protected and guided by AFOSI efforts.

AFOSI used experiences gained during Operation Urgent Fury for future operations. Many of the deployed agents credited prior participation in exercises for helping them to prepare for real-world operations.

== Task Force Black ==
OSI’s charter provides warfighting support in deployed theaters of operation, including Afghanistan.

OSI special agents in deployed theaters find, fix, and neutralize threats to Air Force expeditionary bases, helping to “keep the airfield green” and ensuring freedom of movement for vital Air Force equipment and personnel.

One of OSI’s flagship units was Expeditionary Detachment (EDet) 2413. The unit was a Task Force that combined the efforts and expertise of OSI Special Agents, intelligence specialists, Air Force Security Forces, linguists, and Intelligence, Surveillance and Reconnaissance operators.

Mission

Task Force Black (TFB), also known as EDet 2413, began as an Operating Location (OL) to EDet 2405 Bagram Airfield, Afghanistan in 2005. The need for the OL to become its own detachment was quickly recognized, and EDet 2413 was stood up in 2008.

Early members of EDet 2413 drew attention from the battle space owner, after the capture of a high-value target (HVT) utilizing partner-country special operations forces, resulting in long term custody. EDet 2413 also helped secure two of the largest drug seizures in history, conducted jointly with the Drug Enforcement Administration and attached U.S. Special Forces.

EDet 2413 took steps toward normalizing OSI operations throughout southern Afghanistan with both inside- and outside-the-wire operations. These steps led to EDet 2413 officially becoming Task Force Black in 2009, which institutionalized the Tactical Security Element (TSE) Defenders.

In 2013, TFB realized it was outgrowing its support capabilities and worked with the 24th Expeditionary Field Investigations Squadron (24 EFIS) at Al Udeid Air Base, Qatar, to secure dedicated intelligence, surveillance and reconnaissance assets.

Throughout its history, TFB assisted Afghan partners to respond to rocket and mortar attacks, ground assaults, and explosive device ambushes, while pursuing those who wanted to defraud the airfield and limit wartime capabilities.

TFB destroyed of thousands of tons of explosives, ammunition and weapons, and many HVT neutralizations. TFB supported partners to ensure overall success of the war effort, but also the reconstruction effort of Afghanistan. TFB tallied thousands of outside-the-wire missions, resulting in intelligence reports given to the Intelligence Community and battlespace owners.

EDet 2413/Task Force Black also known as “Lucky 13”

The Task Force Black team worked together with joint, Afghan, and international partners to identify, deter, and stop threats to Kandahar Airfield. Operating both on and off-the installation, Task Force Black personnel supported Afghan partners in enforcing Afghan law and deterring terrorism.

Through their efforts, Task Force Black provided commanders with a better understanding of the local area and local threats. In cooperation with international partners also working to ensure the stability and rule of law in Afghanistan, Task Force Black forged and furthered operational cooperation to safeguard the local battlespace from terrorism.

Upon mission stand-down, Task Force Black handed off their Force Protection responsibilities, ensuring that U.S., Allied and Afghan missions continued.

== Training and physical requirements ==
All new OSI special agent recruits—whether officer, enlisted, or civilian—receive their entry-level training at the U.S. Department of Homeland Security's Federal Law Enforcement Training Center (FLETC) in Glynco, Georgia. The candidates attend the 12-week Criminal Investigator Training Program with other federal law enforcement trainees. That course is followed by eight weeks of OSI agency-specific coursework, at the U.S. Air Force Special Investigations Academy (USAFSIA), co-located at FLETC. Both courses offer new agents training in firearms and other weapons, defensive tactics, forensics, surveillance and surveillance detection, antiterrorism techniques, crime scene processing, interrogations and interviews, court testimony, and military and federal law. Upon graduation, new OSI special agents spend a one-year probationary period in the field. Upon successful completion, some agents receive specialized training in economic crime, antiterrorism service, counterintelligence, computer crimes and other sophisticated criminal investigative capabilities. Others attend 12 weeks of technical training to acquire electronic, photographic and other skills required to perform technical surveillance countermeasures. Experienced agents selected for polygraph duties attend a 14-week Department of Defense course.

Each recruit is expected to participate in each of the following exercises: flexibility, bench press, 1.5-mile (2.4 km) run/walk and agility run. All students are tested to determine their fitness level, and each test is age and gender normed. OSI special agents are expected to remain physically fit throughout their employment and must maintain Air Force physical fitness standards as defined by Air Force Instruction (AFI) 36-2905.

== Firearms ==
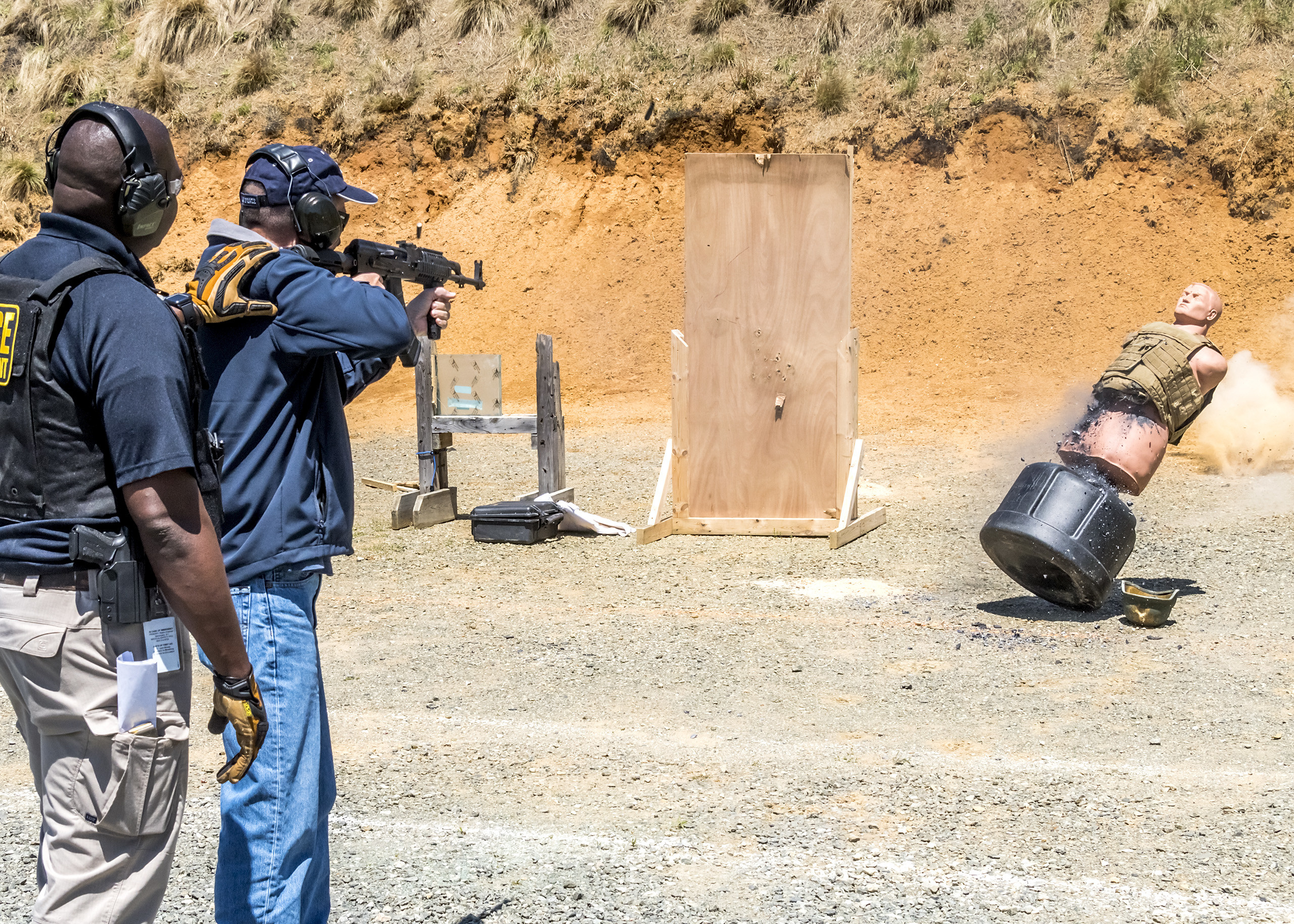
A U.S. Air Force Special Investigations Academy (USAFSIA) Instructor provides guidance on firing an AK-47 during the weapons familiarization training at the Senior Leader Security Seminar.

OSI agents' primary firearm is the 9×19mm Glock 19 or Glock 26, though other weapons are available for use depending on the needs of the mission, including the M4 and MP5. Agents may also carry one personally owned weapon (POW) from an approved list of manufacturers in 9mm. However, agents must qualify with one of the government-issued Glock pistols.

== Air Force Academy Informant Program ==
In December 2013, The Colorado Springs Gazette reported that OSI was operating a Confidential Informant Program at the U.S. Air Force Academy (USAFA), Colorado Springs, Colorado, which recruited cadets to gather information about other rule breakers and criminals. The program left the recruits to take responsibility for both the initial incident and any subsequent rule-breaking behavior resulting from the directions of OSI agents. One of the cadets who participated said, "...it was effective. We got 15 convictions of drugs, two convictions of sexual assault. We were making a difference. It was motivating, especially with the sexual assaults. You could see the victims have a sense of peace."

In response, the USAFA Superintendent now has oversight of the program at the Academy. Though the Superintendent is aware of the operations, OSI has command and control of the program.

== Specialities ==
OSI has a number of specialties composed of experienced Special Agents:

- Forensic science;
- Tech Service;
- Cyber;
- Polygraph examination;
- Investigations;
- counter-espionage;
- antiterrorism;
- Protective Services Operations;
- Counterintelligence.

== Notable agents ==
- Arlen Specter, former U.S. Senator for Pennsylvania and OSI special agent
- Herb Bateman, former member of the U.S. House of Representatives for Virginia's 1st congressional district and OSI special agent, who died on 11 September 2000

== Fallen Agents ==
During the height of the Iraq and Afghan wars, OSI Special Agents conducted counterintelligence, protective service and force protection operations. These operations involved running sources in combat zones, tracking down IED cells, protecting senior leaders and regular collections "outside the wire." OSI combat deployments resulted in the injury & death of several Special Agents as a result of mortar attacks, IEDS and suicide bombers. Consequently, OSI had the highest casualty rate among 1811 agencies during that time-frame.

== In popular culture ==
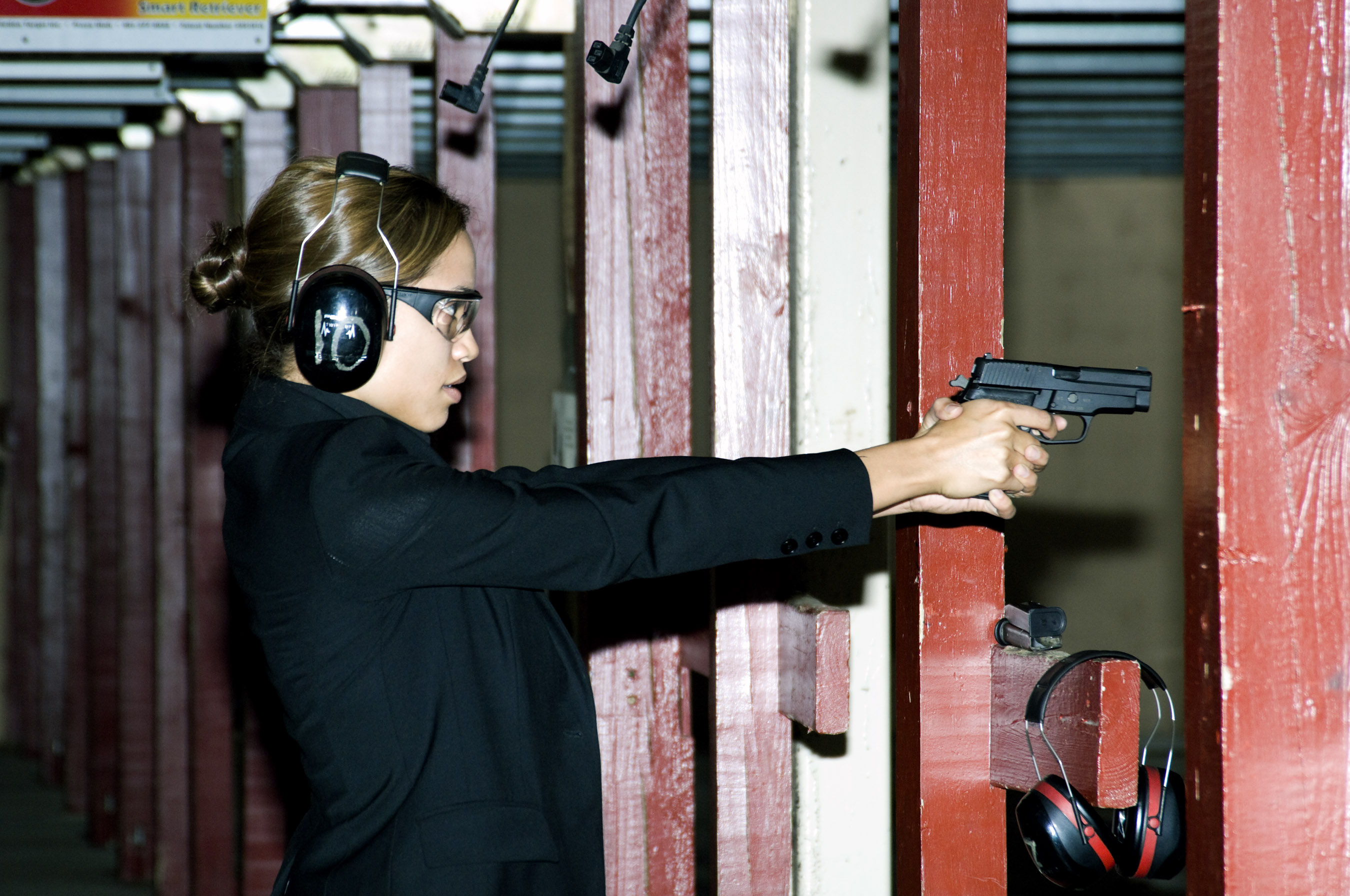
Rosario Dawson fires a M11 pistol at the firing range at Andrews Air Force Base, while researching her role in Eagle Eye.

- In the 2008 film Eagle Eye, actress Rosario Dawson played OSI Special Agent Zoe Perez.
- In the 2013 film Mirage Men, Richard C. Doty, a retired OSI special agent, is interviewed about the OSI investigation.
- In the seventh episode of Season 8 in the (1997 television series) Stargate SG-1, SG-1 team member Teal'c has been given permission to live off-base by the OSI in general, but is subsequently investigated by OSI officer 'Colonel Kendrick' for stopping or otherwise becoming involved with crimes in his neighbourhood.
- In the first episode of Season 2 in the (2013 television series) The Americans, KGB Agents Philip Jennings (Matthew Rhys) and Emmett Connors posed as "United States Air Force Security Forces" and wore OSI badges.
- DOD Investigation Programs: Background Data. Washington, D.C.: United States General Accounting Office, 1989.
- Wilson, William. Dictionary of the United States Intelligence Services: Over 1500 Terms, Programs, and Agencies. Jefferson, NC: McFarland, 1996.

== See also ==
- Commander of the Department of the Air Force Office of Special Investigations
- Federal law enforcement in the United States

Military Criminal Investigative Organizations

- United States Army Criminal Investigation Division (USACIDC or CID)
- United States Army Counterintelligence (ACI)
- Naval Criminal Investigative Service (NCIS)
- Defense Criminal Investigative Service (DCIS)
- Coast Guard Investigative Service (CGIS)

Department of the Air Force

- Secretary of the Air Force
- Inspector General of the Department of the Air Force
- Judge Advocate General's Corps, U.S. Air Force
- United States Air Force Security Forces
- Department of the Air Force Police
- U.S. Air Force Intelligence, Surveillance and Reconnaissance Agency
- 6004th Air Intelligence Service Squadron

Other

- Special agent
- Federal Law Enforcement Training Centers
- Department of Defense Cyber Crime Center (DC3)
- Criminal Investigation Task Force (CITF)
- Internet Crimes Against Children Task Force (ICAC Task Force)
- Donald Nichols, former OSI special agent
- Monica Witt
