= General Burnham =

General Burnham may refer to:

- Hiram Burnham (1814–1864), Union Army brigadier general
- Robert F. Burnham (1913–1969), U.S. Air Force brigadier general
- William P. Burnham (1860−1930), U.S. Army major general
