= Cappucci =

Cappucci is a surname. Notable people with the surname include:

- Enrico Cappucci (1910–1976), American politician
- Joseph J. Cappucci (1913–1992), U.S. Air Force Brigadier General
