= Joseph Carroll (general) =

United States Air Force general

Joseph Francis Carroll
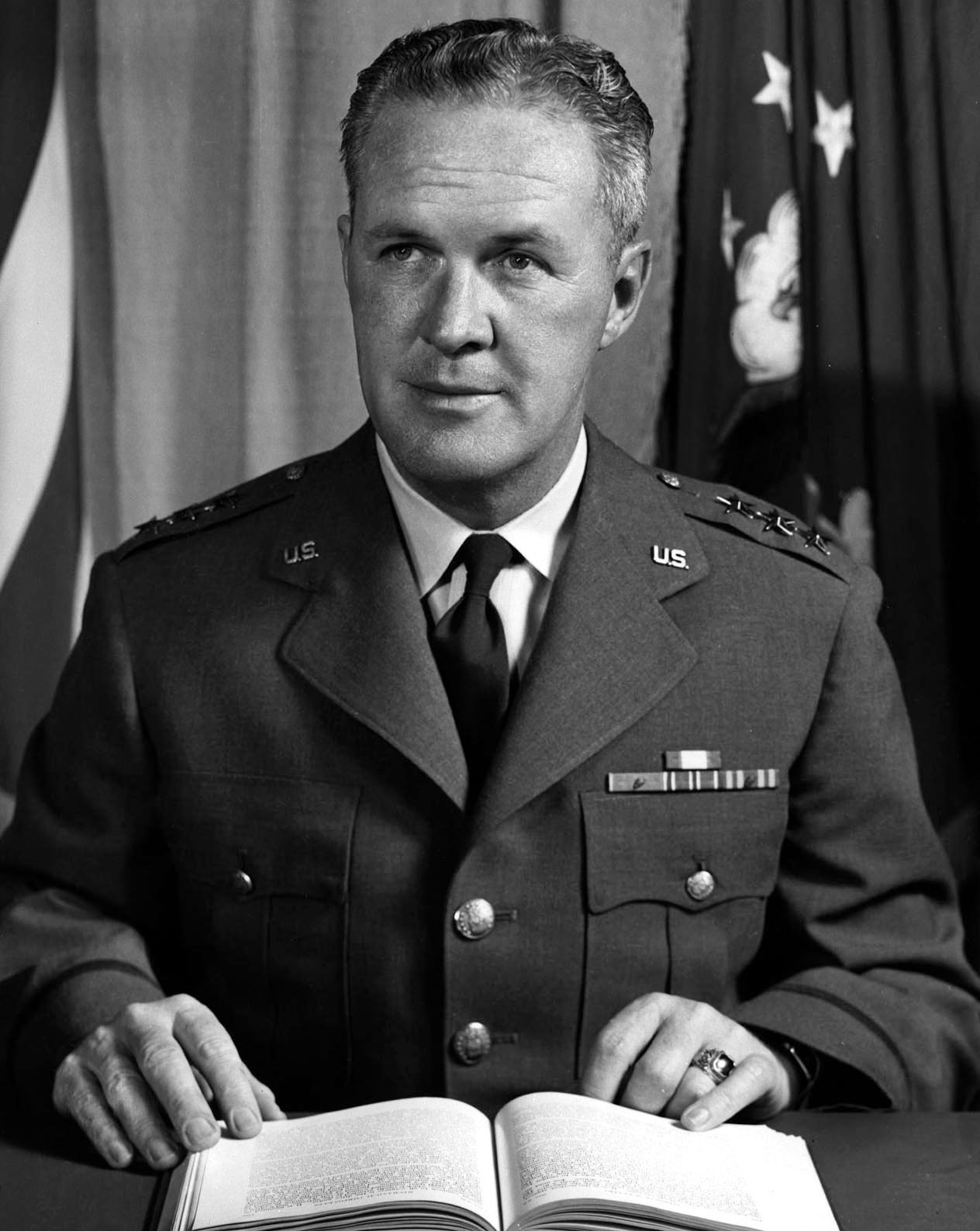
- Born: March 19, 1910; Chicago, Illinois, US
- Died: January 20, 1991 (aged 80)
- Burial place: Arlington National Cemetery
- Relatives: James P. Carroll
- Military career
- Allegiance: United States of America
- Branch: United States Air Force
- Service years: 1948 – 1969
- Rank: Lieutenant general
- Commands: Defense Intelligence Agency; Inspector General of the Air Force; Air Force Office of Special Investigations
- Awards: Distinguished Service Medal; Legion of Merit; Air Force Outstanding Unit Award; National Defense Service Medal; Air Force Longevity Service Award

Lieutenant General Joseph Francis Carroll (March 19, 1910 – January 20, 1991) was the founding director of the Defense Intelligence Agency (DIA) and the first commander of the U.S. Air Force Office of Special Investigations (AFOSI or OSI).

== Youth and education ==
General Carroll was born in Chicago, Illinois. He graduated from St. Mary of the Lake Seminary in Mundelein, Illinois, in 1933 with a Bachelor of Arts degree and earned a J.D. degree from Loyola University in 1940. He was a member of the Illinois State Bar Association from 1940 to his death.

Carroll left the Seminary of St. Mary on the eve of being ordained a deacon, a transitional stage leading to ordination to the priesthood, in order to have a relationship with Mary Morrissey, who was to become his wife. After working with Swift and Company, a meat-packing concern, in Chicago, where he rose to a position as assistant sales manager, and soon after completion of law school, he left to join the Federal Bureau of Investigation (FBI).

Carroll was survived by his wife, Mary, and five sons, one of whom is former priest and writer James Carroll.

== Time as an FBI special agent ==
General Carroll joined the FBI in October 1940, where he served as a special agent in field offices at Memphis and Knoxville, Tennessee, before assignment to the Chicago, Illinois field office. He was instrumental in catching noted gangster Roger "Tough" Touhy, which brought him to the personal attention of FBI Director J. Edgar Hoover. In May 1944, he was transferred to the Washington headquarters of the FBI, where he held progressive positions as supervisor in charge of bank robbery and kidnapping matters, chief of the Criminal Section, and first assistant to the assistant director of the FBI in charge of the General Investigations and Accounting Division.

At the end of World War II, the U.S. Government was faced with the problem of disposition of war surplus property throughout the world. Upon special request from the administrator of the Surplus Property Administration, Carroll was lent by the attorney general and the director of the FBI to the Surplus Property Administration (later the War Assets Administration). In this assignment he organized and directed the Compliance Enforcement Division, directing all investigative activity associated with surplus property disposal. In May 1947, he was recalled to his former position in the FBI as an administrative assistant to the director of the FBI.

== Military service ==
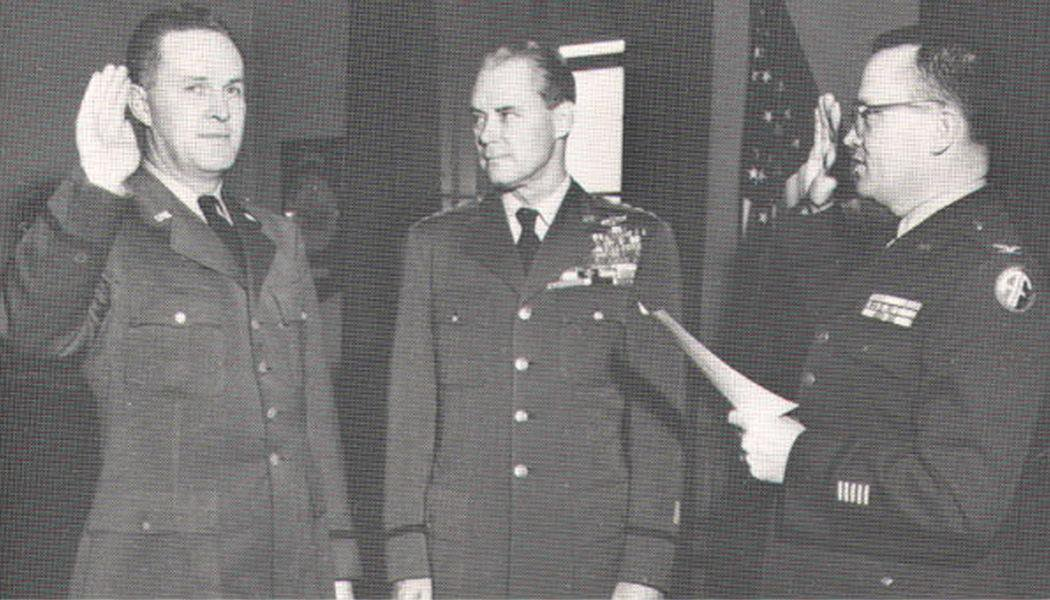
Brig. Gen. Joseph F. Carroll (left) being sworn in as AFOSI's first Commander, as Chief of Staff of the Air Force Hoyt S. Vandenberg (center) witnesses the swearing-in, ca. 1948.

When the U.S. Air Force was established as a separate executive department under the National Security Act of 1947, Secretary of the Air Force W. Stuart Symington, requested FBI Director J. Edgar Hoover to loan General Carroll to the services to organize a U.S. Air Force agency for investigative and counterintelligence functions. He organized and directed this new organization, the AFOSI, along the lines of the FBI rather than the U.S. Army's Criminal Investigation Command (USACIDC or CID). General Carroll was tendered a commission as a colonel, U.S. Air Force Reserve, January 12, 1948. He was ordered to active duty in the grade of brigadier general May 6, 1948, and promoted to major general August 11, 1950.

From the time of his entry on active duty on May 6, 1948, General Carroll served as the first director of AFOSI, creating and organizing this centrally-directed investigative service, establishing district offices to service the air commands in the United States, and furnishing trained specialists to Air Force activities worldwide for the conduct of special investigations.

On September 6, 1950, he was appointed deputy inspector general (IG) for security, U.S. Air Force. In this assignment he was responsible for the security and physical protection of Air Force installations and activities against sabotage, espionage, and other hostile threats. In this capacity, he directed AFOSI, the U.S. Air Force Office of the Provost Marshal, and was responsible for all security plans and policy for the U.S. Air Force.

Until 1952, General Carroll had been a member of the U.S. Air Force Reserve on active duty, On January 29, 1952, he was granted a commission into the Regular Air Force as a permanent colonel by a special act of Congress.

General Carroll was then assigned to Wiesbaden, Germany, April 1, 1958, as deputy commander (rear) for the U.S. Air Forces in Europe (USAFE). He served in that capacity until November 1959 when, under a command reorganization, he was named chief of staff, USAFE. While there, he was stationed with his close friend from seminary, Monsignor, and later major general and Air Force Chief of Chaplains, Edwin R. Chess.

On February 1, 1960, General Carroll was promoted to lieutenant general and became The Inspector General of the U.S. Air Force stationed at Headquarters, U.S. Air Force, in Washington, D.C. He remained in that position until October 1, 1961, when the secretary of defense, Robert S. McNamara, appointed him to his last assignment as the first director of the Defense Intelligence Agency, with the responsibility for controlling Department of Defense (DoD) intelligence resources assigned to DIA and reviewing the intelligence functions assigned the military departments in satisfying the intelligence requirements of the DoD. He retired September 15, 1969.

With his last residence being in Fairfax County, Virginia, on January 20, 1991, Retired U.S. Air Force Lt. Gen. Joseph Francis Carroll died due to complications related to Alzheimer's disease, from which he suffered for a decade. He was buried at Arlington National Cemetery.

== Relations with sons ==
The Vietnam War introduced serious tensions into the general's family life. His son Dennis fled to India to escape service. Nevertheless, General Carroll donned his uniform to represent Dennis, after he returned from India, before the Selective Service board and succeeded in getting his son recognized as a conscientious objector. There were also serious disagreements with his son James, who was ordained to the Roman Catholic priesthood in 1969. Father and son first clashed over the Rev. Dr. Martin Luther King Jr.; the general suspected several of King's aides were Communists, whereas James admired King as a champion of the poor. James' anti-war activity was an embarrassment to his father. After leaving the priesthood, James became a journalist and author. Several of his novels, including Prince of Peace (1984) and Memorial Bridge (1991), bear traces of the general's fraught relations with his sons, albeit in fictionalized form. James Carroll's memoir, An American Requiem: God, My Father, and the War That Came Between Us, winner of the National Book Award in 1996, addressed his differences with his father directly.

=== Dates of rank ===
| Insignia | Rank | Date |
|---|---|---|
| | Lieutenant general | February 1, 1960 |
| | Colonel | January 29, 1952 |
| | Major general – U.S. Air Force Reserve | August 11, 1950 |
| | Brigadier general – U.S. Air Force Reserve | May 6, 1948 |
| | Colonel – U.S. Air Force Reserve | January 12, 1948 |

== Major awards and decorations ==
Carroll is the recipient of the following:

| 1st Row | Distinguished Service Medal | | Legion of Merit with oak leaf cluster |
| 2nd Row | Air Force Outstanding Unit Award | National Defense Service Medal with bronze star | Air Force Longevity Service Award with four oak leaf clusters |

== See also ==
- List of Directors of the Defense Intelligence Agency (DIA)
- List of Inspector Generals of the Air Force
- List of Commanders of the Air Force Office of Special Investigations (AFOSI)

Military offices
| Preceded by Position established | Director of the Defense Intelligence Agency; 1961 – 1969 | Succeeded by Donald V. Bennett |
| Preceded by Elmer J. Rogers Jr. | Inspector General of the Air Force; 1960 – 1961 | Succeeded by William H. Blanchard |
| Preceded by Position established | Commander of the Air Force Office of Special Investigations; 1948 – 1955 | Succeeded by Joseph E. Murray |
