= John Martin Breit =

Retired American United States Air Force Major General

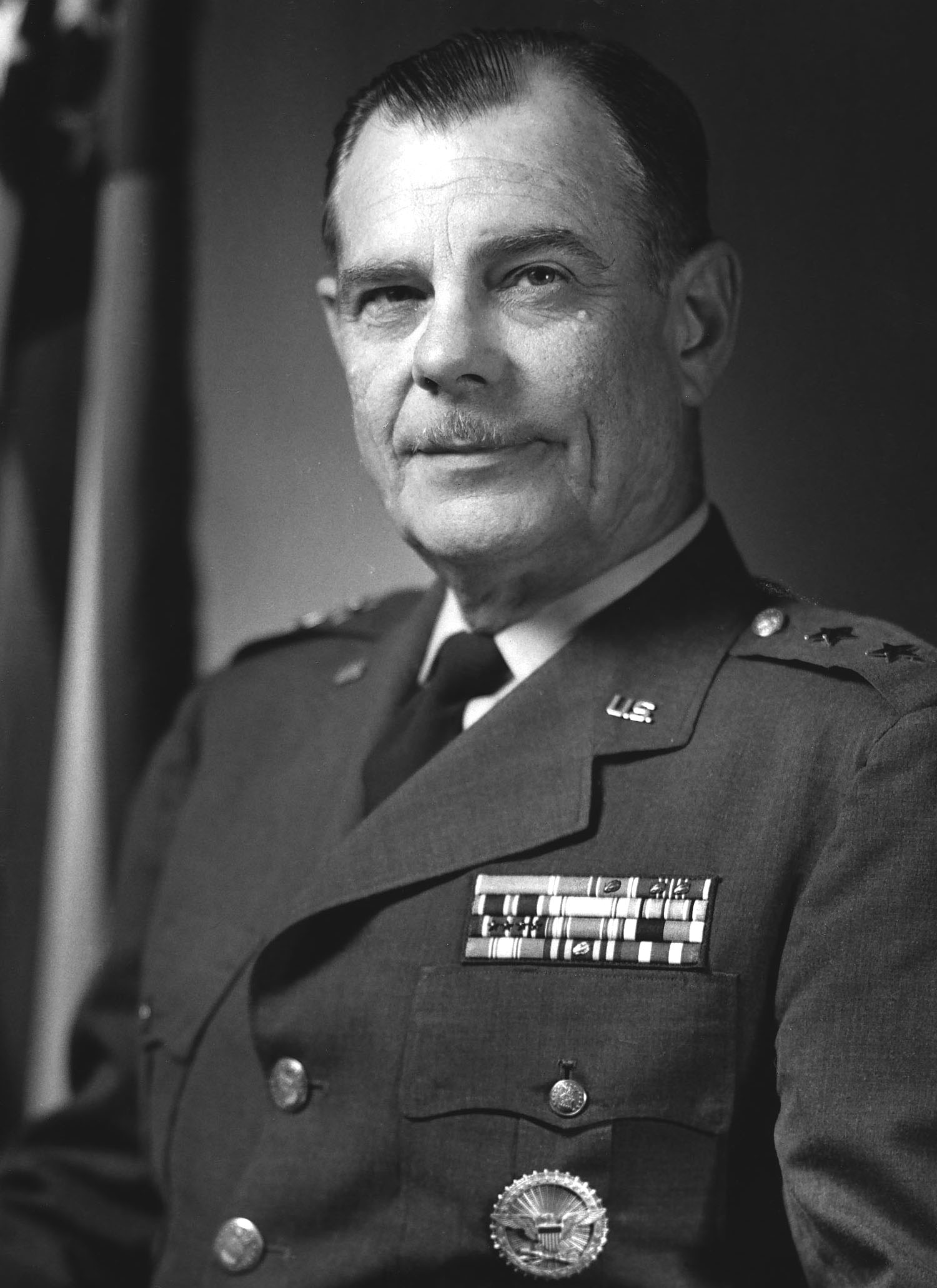
- Born: January 28, 1910; San Antonio, Texas, US
- Died: October 6, 1981 (aged 71)
- Military career
- Allegiance: United States
- Branch: United States Air Force
- Service years: 1933–1963
- Rank: Major general (Ret.)
- Units: 362d Infantry; 7th Infantry; 45th Infantry; 17th Infantry; 9th Infantry; 34th Infantry
- Commands: Air Force Office of Special Investigations; 135th Infantry
- Conflicts: World War II; Korean War
- Awards: Legion of Merit; Bronze Star Medal; Merito di Guerro (Italy)

John Martin Breit (January 28, 1910 – October 6, 1981) was a major general in the United States Air Force. Breit was born in San Antonio, Texas. He attended the U.S. Military Academy from 1929 to 1933.

== Military career ==
In 1928, Breit first enlisted in the Texas National Guard and was made a first sergeant. The following year, he entered the U.S. Military Academy on a National Guard appointment. Upon graduation in 1933, he was commissioned as a second lieutenant and his first assignment was as company commander in the 34th Infantry at Fort Meade, MD. In 1939, Breit was ordered to Pettit Barracks, Zamboanga, Philippine Islands. While there, he commanded a company of Philippine Scout soldiers of the 45th Infantry. A year later, he was transferred to Fort McKinley near Manila, and commanded another scout company. As a result, Breit was commended by General Douglas MacArthur and General Basilio J. Valdes, chief of staff, Philippine Army, for outstanding performance while on temporary additional duty with the Philippine Army in conjunction with its mobilization training program.

In 1942, Breit was assigned as a training staff officer at Headquarters Army Ground Forces, Washington, D.C. In this position, he was detailed to southern France. He participated in the landings at St. Tropez and remained with the operation until joined with the Normandy forces in front of the Vosges mountains. For this he was awarded the Legion of Merit, with the citation stating, in part, that he "exercised outstanding ability, imagination, initiative and resourcefulness in contributing immeasurably to the training mission ..." of Army Ground Forces.

In July 1946, Breit became a student at the Air War College and was commended for "outstanding initiative, sound professional knowledge and clear judgment." After graduation from the Air War College in 1947, he was assigned to Alaska and became director of plans for the Alaskan Air Command. Later, the same year, he was transferred to the U.S. Air Force.

From 1948 to 1958, Breit was assigned to various staff positions, including duties as deputy director for plans in Headquarters U.S. European Command and deputy air provost marshal, U.S. Air Force, where he was promoted to brigadier general. In January 1959, he became director of special investigations, Office of The Inspector General, Headquarters U.S. Air Force; and on August 1, 1960, deputy inspector general for security with additional duty as director of special investigations, Headquarters U.S. Air Force. He was promoted to major general on July 1, 1961. On June 11, 1962, he was relieved from additional duty as director of special investigations. Shortly after, Breit was assigned as deputy, The Inspector General, Headquarters U.S. Air Force.

=== Major awards and decorations ===
Breit is the recipient of the following:

Legion of Merit with oak leaf cluster	Bronze Star Medal	Merito di Guerro (Italy)

Combat Infantry Badge	Office of the Secretary of Defense Identification Badge

== Personal life ==
Breit was the son of Martin M. Breit and Eva G. Breit (Boucher), and the brother of Eugene Breit. Eugene Breit was a first lieutenant and pilot in the U.S. Army Air Force who was killed during World War II while flying from Momote Airfield, Los Negros Island, Admiralty Islands, Papua New Guinea, on a strike mission over Truk Lagoon. Breit died on October 6, 1981, at the age of 71.

== Notes ==
Military offices
Preceded by BG Joseph E. Murray	Commander of the Air Force Office of Special Investigations; Jan 1959 – Jun 1962	Succeeded by BG Robert F. Burnham
