= General Rogers =

General Rogers may refer to:

- Bernard W. Rogers (1921–2008), U.S. Army general
- Bob Rogers (SAAF officer) (1921–2000), South African Air Force lieutenant general
- Charles Calvin Rogers (1929–1990), U.S. Army major general
- Craven C. Rogers Jr. (1934–2016), U.S. Air Force lieutenant general
- Elmer J. Rogers Jr. (1903–2002), U.S. Air Force lieutenant general
- F. Michael Rogers (1921–2014), U.S. Air Force general
- Ford O. Rogers (1894–1972), U.S. Marine Corps major general
- Gordon Byrom Rogers (1901–1967), U.S. Army lieutenant general
- Harry Lovejoy Rogers (1867–1925), U.S. Army major general
- Paul D. Rogers (fl. 1980s–2020s), Michigan Army National Guard major general
- Robert Montresor Rogers (1834–1895), British Army major general
- William W. Rogers (1893–1976), U.S. Marine Corps major general

== See also ==
- Attorney General Rogers (disambiguation)
