= Commander of the Department of the Air Force Office of Special Investigations =

United States Commander of the Office of Special Investigations

Commander of the Office of Special Investigations
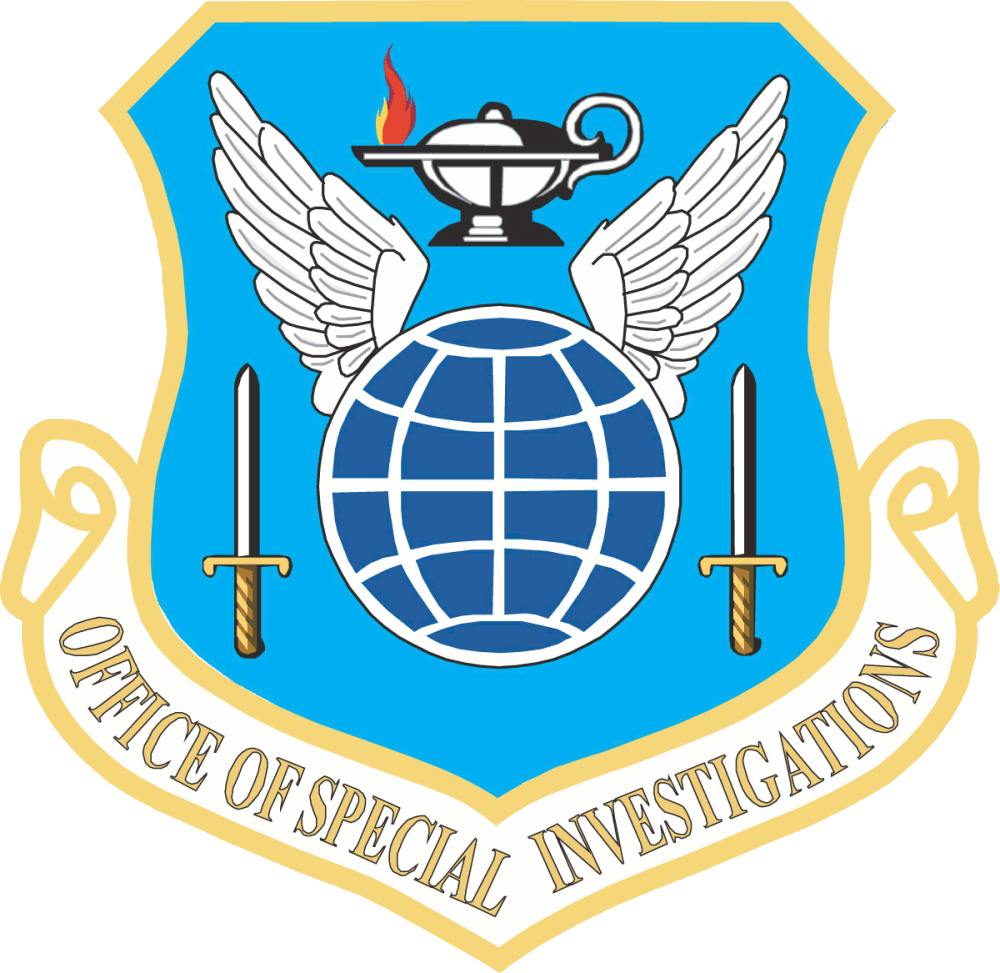
- Office of Special Investigations; Emblem
- Incumbent; Brig. Gen. Amy S. Bumgarner since May 2023
- Style: Special Agent; OSI/CC (formal address in writing)
- Reports to: Secretary of the Air Force; Inspector General of the Department of the Air Force
- Inaugural holder: Joseph F. Carroll
- Formation: 6 May 1948
- Website: Official website

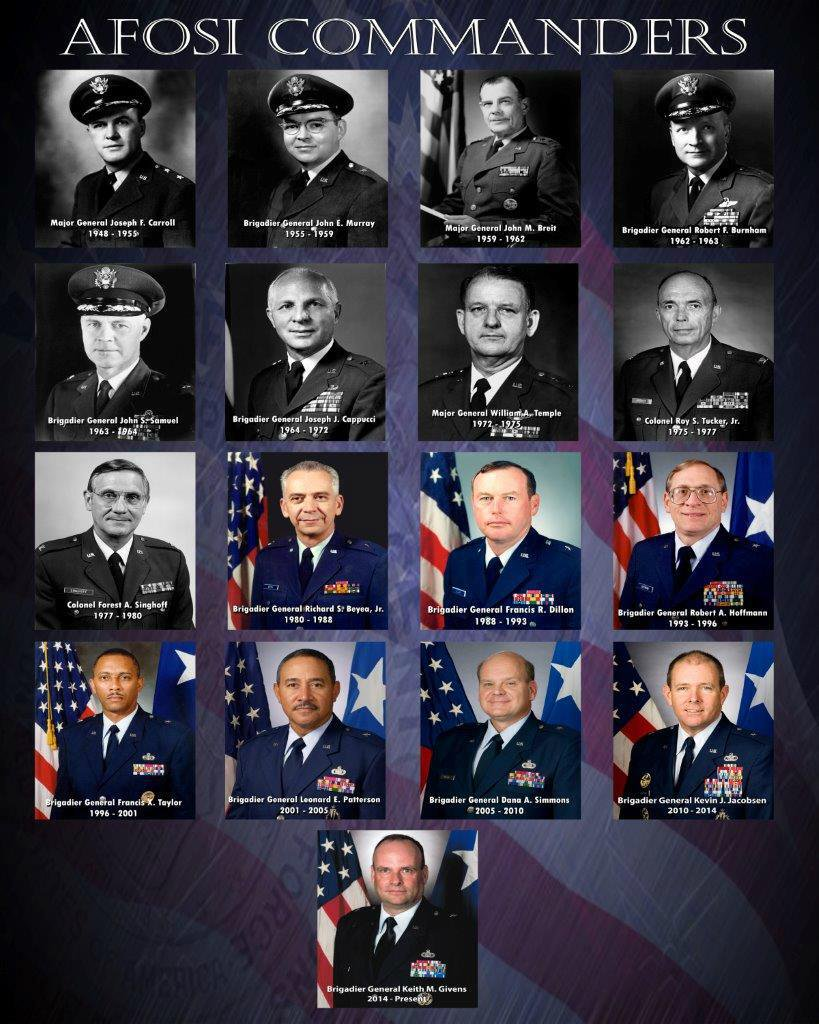
Commanders of the Office of Special Investigations

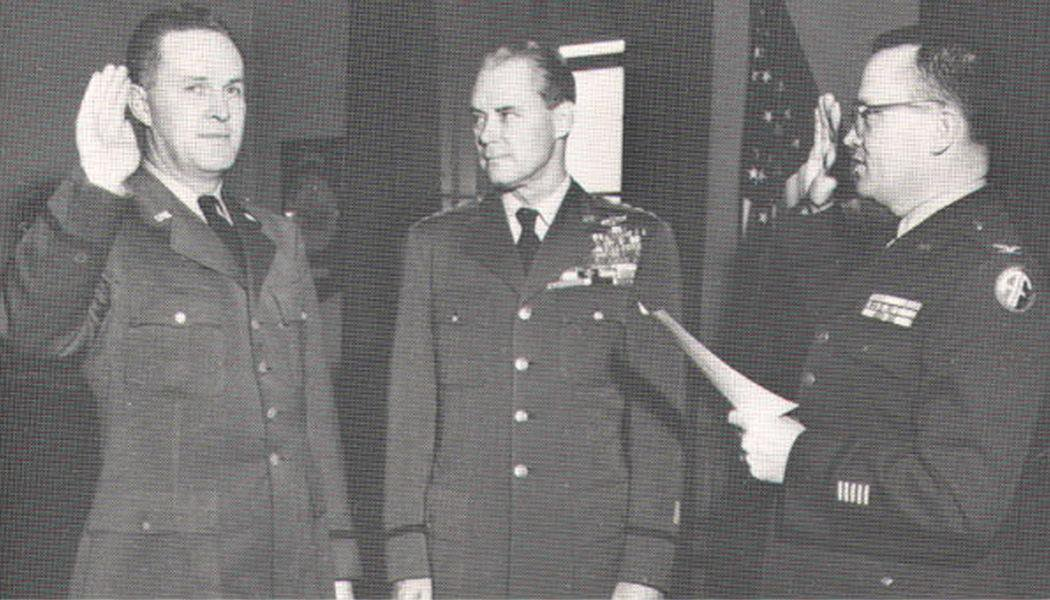
Brig. Gen. Joseph F. Carroll (left) being sworn in as OSI's first Commander, as Chief of Staff of the Air Force Hoyt S. Vandenberg (center) witnesses the swearing-in, ca. 1948.

The commander of the Office of Special Investigations (OSI/CC) heads the Office of Special Investigations (OSI) and derives its independent criminal investigative authority directly from the secretary of the Air Force. OSI is also a field operating agency under the administrative guidance and oversight of the inspector general of the Department of the Air Force.

Brigadier General Amy S. Bumgarner is the current and 20th commander of OSI.

By federal statue, OSI is a federal law enforcement agency with responsibility for conducting criminal investigations, counterintelligence, specialized investigative activities, protective service operations and integrated force protection for the Air Force and Space Force. OSI is also a combat-ready military criminal investigative organization that provides the Air Force and Space Force a wartime capability with counterintelligence support to force protection to find, fix, track and neutralize enemy threats in hostile and uncertain environments. OSI is the Air Force and Space Force's focal point for working with U.S. and foreign nation law enforcement and security services in order to provide timely and accurate threat information in all environments. The activities of OSI are conducted by a worldwide network of over 2,000 military and civilian special agents stationed at major Air Force and Space Force installations and a variety of worldwide special operating locations.

== List of commanders of the Office of Special Investigations ==
#	Rank	Name	Photo	Begin Date	End Date	Secretary of the Air Force served under	Inspector General of the Department of the Air Force served under
1	Lt. Gen.	Joseph F. Carroll		May 1948	1955	Stuart Symington; Thomas K. Finletter; Harold E. Talbott	St. Clair Streett; Adlai H. Gilkeson; Hugh J. Knerr
2	Brig. Gen.	Joseph E. Murray		1955	1959	Talbott; Donald A. Quarles; James H. Douglas Jr.	Truman H. Landon; Elmer J. Rogers Jr.
3	Maj. Gen.	John Martin Breit		January 1959	June 1962	Douglas; Dudley C. Sharp; Eugene M. Zuckert	Joseph F. Carroll; William H. Blanchard
4	Brig. Gen.	Robert F. Burnham		June 1962	June 1963	Zuckert	Blanchard
5	Maj. Gen.	John S. Samuel		June 1963	May 1964	Zuckert	Blanchard; John Dale Ryan
6	Brig. Gen.	Joseph J. Cappucci		June 1964	March 1972	Zuckert; Harold Brown; Robert Seamans	Ryan; Theodore R. Milton; Joseph Harold Moore; Selmon W. Wells; Louis L. Wilson Jr.
7	Maj. Gen.	William A. Temple		April 1972	July 1975	Seamans; John L. McLucas	Wilson; Gerald W. Johnson; Donald G. Nunn
8	Col.	Roy C. Tucker Jr.		August 1975	March 1977	McLucas; Acting James W. Plummer; Thomas C. Reed; John C. Stetson	Nunn; John P. Flynn
9	Col.	Forest A. Singhoff		April 1977	May 1980	Stetson; Hans Mark	Flynn; Howard M. Lane; Howard W. Leaf
10	Brig. Gen.	Richard S. Beyea Jr.		June 1980	February 1988	Mark; Verne Orr; Russell A. Rourke; Edward C. Aldridge Jr.	Leaf; Robert W. Bazley; Monroe W. Hatch Jr. Robert D. Springer; Buford D. Lary
11	Brig. Gen.	Francis R. Dillon		February 1988	April 1993	Alridge; Acting James F. McGovern; Acting John J. Welch, Jr. Donald B. Rice; Acting Michael B. Donley	Lary; Bradley C. Hosmer; Eugene H. Fischer
12	Brig. Gen.	Robert A. Hoffmann		April 1993	September 1996	Donley; Sheila E. Widnall	Fischer; Marcus A. Anderson; Richard T. Swope
13	Brig. Gen.	Francis X. Taylor		September 1996	May 2001	Widnall; F. Whitten Peters; Acting Lawrence J. Delaney	Swope; Nicholas B. Kehoe; Raymond P. Huot
14	Brig. Gen.	L. Eric Patterson		May 2001	June 2005	Delaney; James G. Roche; Acting Peter B. Teets; Acting Michael Montelongo; Acting Michael L. Dominguez	Huot; Steven R. Polk
15	Brig. Gen.	Dana A. Simmons		June 2005	March 2010	Dominguez; Acting Pete Geren; Michael Wynne; Donley	Polk; Ronald F. Sams; Marc E. Rogers
16	Brig. Gen.	Kevin J. Jacobsen		April 2010	September 2014	Donley; Acting Eric Fanning; Deborah Lee James	Rogers; Stephen P. Mueller; Gregory A. Biscone
17	Brig. Gen.	Keith M. Givens		May 2014	May 2017	James; Acting Lisa Disbrow	Biscone; Anthony J. Rock
18	Col.	Kirk B. Stabler		May 2017	May 2019	Disbrow; Heather Wilson	Rock; Stayce D. Harris; Sami D. Said
19	Brig. Gen.	Terry L. Bullard		May 2019	May 2023	Wilson; Acting Matthew Donovan; Barbara Barrett; Frank Kendall III	Said
20	Brig. Gen.	Amy S. Bumgarner		May 2023	Present	Frank Kendall III	Stephen L. Davis

== See also ==
- List of secretaries of the Air Force
- List of inspectors general of the Department of the Air Force
- List of Air Force judge advocates general
- List of United States federal law enforcement agencies

Military Criminal Investigative Organizations

- United States Army Criminal Investigation Command (USACIDC or CID)
- United States Army Counterintelligence (USAI or CI)
- Naval Criminal Investigative Service (NCIS)
- Defense Criminal Investigative Service (DCIS)
- Coast Guard Investigative Service (CGIS)
