= Robert A. Hoffmann =

United States Air Force Brigadier General Brigadier General

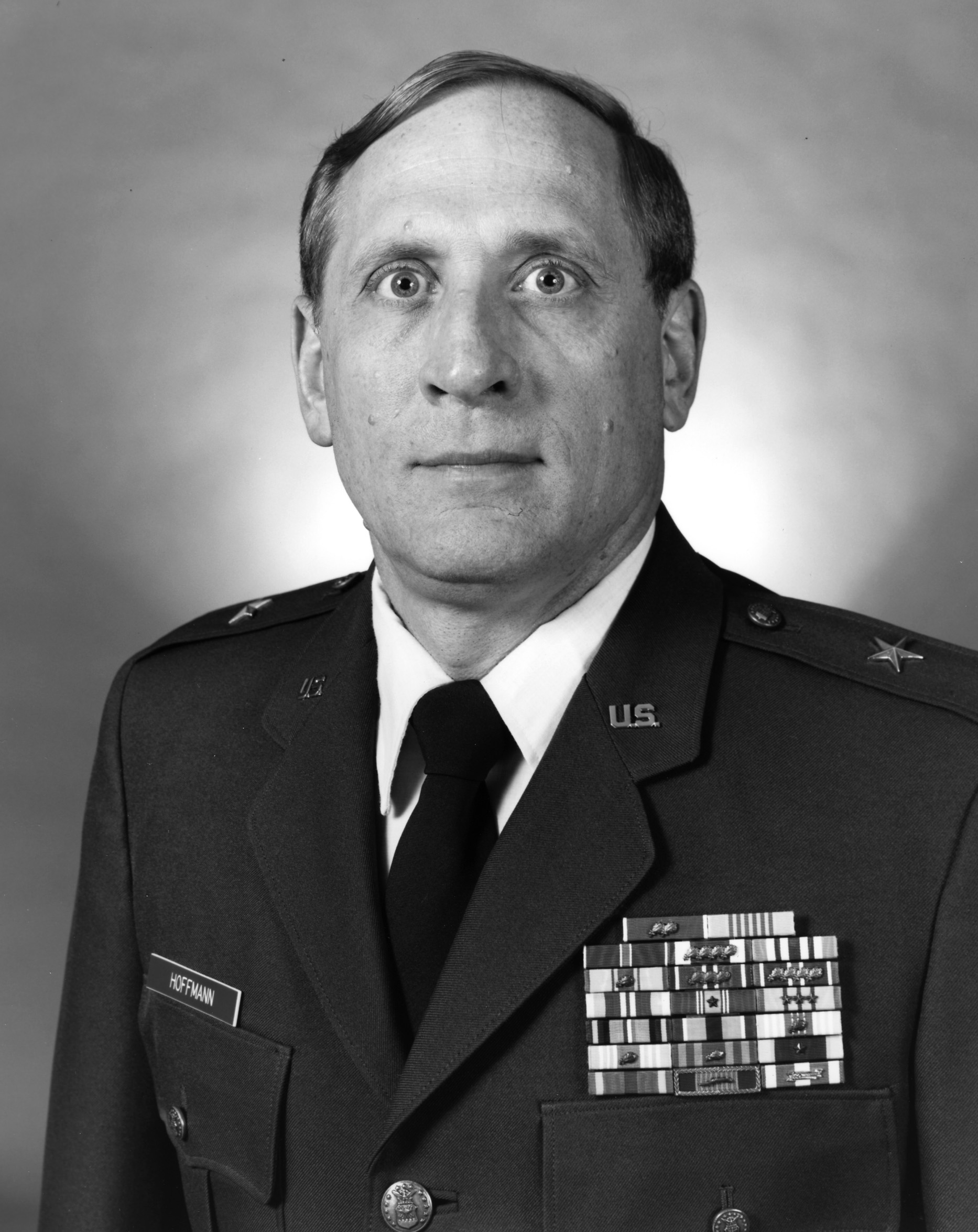
- Military career
- Allegiance: United States
- Branch: United States Air Force
- Service years: 1968 – 1996
- Rank: Brigadier General (Ret.)
- Commands: Air Force Office of Special Investigations
- Awards: 8 major decorations: Legion of Merit; Airman's Medal; Bronze Star Medal; Meritorious Service Medal; Joint Service Commendation Medal; Air Force Commendation Medal; National Intelligence Achievement Medal

Robert A. Hoffmann is a retired United States Air Force Brigadier General (Special Agent) and was the 12th Commander of the Air Force Office of Special Investigations (AFOSI), Bolling AFB, Washington D.C. As the AFOSI Commander, Hoffman was responsible for providing commanders of all Air Force activities, independent professional investigative services regarding fraud, counterintelligence and major criminal matters by using a worldwide network of special agents stationed at all major Air Force installations and a variety of special operating locations.

== Education ==
Hoffmann is a graduate of the Air Force Reserve Officer Training Corps at the University of Massachusetts, where he also obtained a Bachelor of Science. He also received a Master of Science from George Washington University, Washington D.C. Hoffmann is also a graduate of Squadron Officer School, Air Command and Staff College, and Air War College. While at the Air War College, Hoffmann published an article: "Policy Responses to International Terrorism," Quarterly Journal of Ideology, 1987.

== Military career ==
Hoffmann entered the United States Air Force in September 1968. He spent the majority of his career as an AFOSI special agent, where he conducted and supervised felony-level criminal, fraud, and counterintelligence investigations and operations. He commanded at the detachment, squadron and wing levels. His assignments included five overseas postings. Hoffmann also commanded the 7276th Air Base Group, Iraklion Air Station, Greece. Prior to his last assignment as Commander of AFOSI, Hoffmann served as the Director of Criminal Investigations and Counterintelligence, Office of the Inspector General, Office of the Secretary of the Air Force, Washington, D.C.

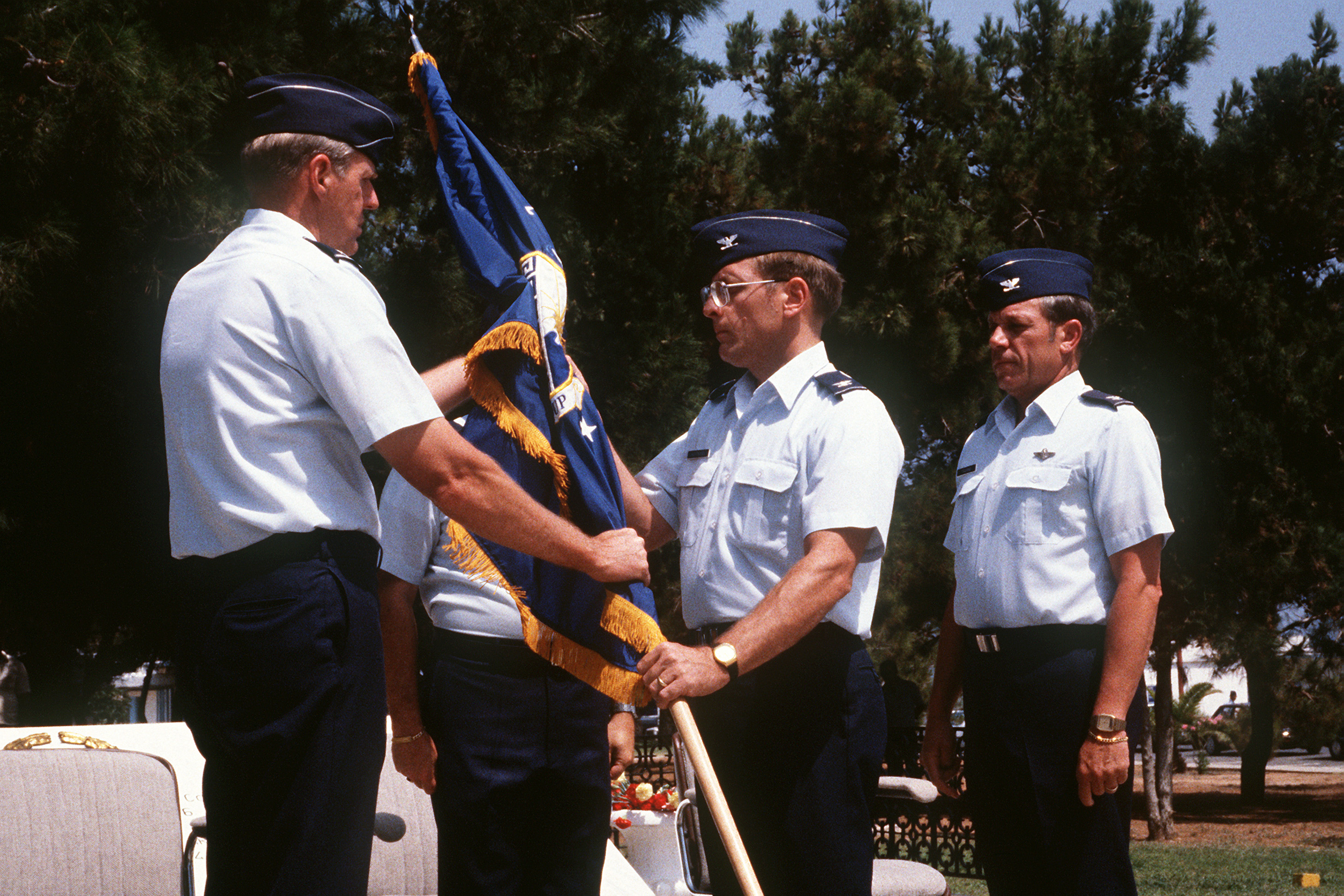
Maj. Gen. Thomas A. Baker (left) commander, 16th Air Force, passes the unit colors of the 7276th Air Base Group to Col. Robert A. Hoffmann (center). Hoffmann is assuming command from Col. Michael T. Tagaras (right).

=== Assignments ===
- June 1968 - September 1968, student, U.S. Air Force Special Investigations School, Washington, D.C.
- June 1968 - December 1970, investigator, Personal Security Investigative Division, AFOSI District 4, Suitland, Md.
- December 1970 - December 1971, criminal investigator, Air Force Office of Special Investigations Detachment 5007, Phan Rang Air Base, South Vietnam.
- January 1972 - September 1975, staff officer, Counterespionage Division, Headquarters Air Force Office of Special Investigations, Bolling Air Force Base, Washington, D.C.
- September 1975 - September 1976, staff officer, Air Force Special Plans Office, Directorate of Plans, Washington, D.C.
- September 1976 - December 1978, detachment commander, Air Force Office of Special Investigations Detachment 7201, Isfahan, Iran.
- January 1979 - July 1980, chief, Counterespionage Branch, Air Force Office of Special Investigations District 70, Lindsey Air Station, West Germany.
- July 1980 - July 1982, staff officer, counterintelligence staff, Central Intelligence Agency, Langley, Va.
- July 1982 - July 1985, deputy commander for operations, Air Force Office of Special Investigations District 4, Andrews Air Force Base, Md.
- July 1985 - July 1986, detachment commander, Air Force Office of Special Investigations Detachment 7024, Ramstein Air Base, West Germany.
- July 1986 - June 1987, student, Air War College, Maxwell Air Force Base, Ala.
- June 1987 - August 1989, commander, 7276th Air Base Group, Iraklion Air Station, Greece.
- August 1989 - July 1991, commander, Air Force Office of Special Investigations District 7, Patrick Air Force Base, Fla.
- July 1991 - April 1993, director, Director of Criminal Investigations and Counterintelligence, Inspector General, Office of the Secretary of the Air Force, Washington, D.C.
- April 1993 - August 1996, commander, Air Force Office of Special Investigations, Bolling Air Force Base, Washington, D.C.

=== Effective dates of promotion ===
Insignia	Rank	Date
	Brigadier General	June 1, 1993
	Colonel	November 1, 1986
	Lieutenant Colonel	November 1, 1981
	Major	September 1, 1979
	Captain	June 25, 1971
	First Lieutenant	December 25, 1969
	Second Lieutenant	June 5, 1968

=== Major awards and decorations ===
Hoffmann is the recipient of the following:

1st Row	Legion of Merit		
2nd Row	Airman's Medal	Bronze Star Medal	Meritorious Service Medal with four oak leaf clusters
3rd Row	Joint Service Commendation Medal	Air Force Commendation Medal with oak leaf cluster	National Intelligence Achievement Medal

== See also ==
- List of Commanders of the Air Force Office of Special Investigations

== Notes ==
Military offices
Preceded by BG Francis R. Dillon	Commander of the Air Force Office of Special Investigations; April 1993 – August 1996	Succeeded by BG Francis X. Taylor
