= 135th Infantry Regiment (United States) =

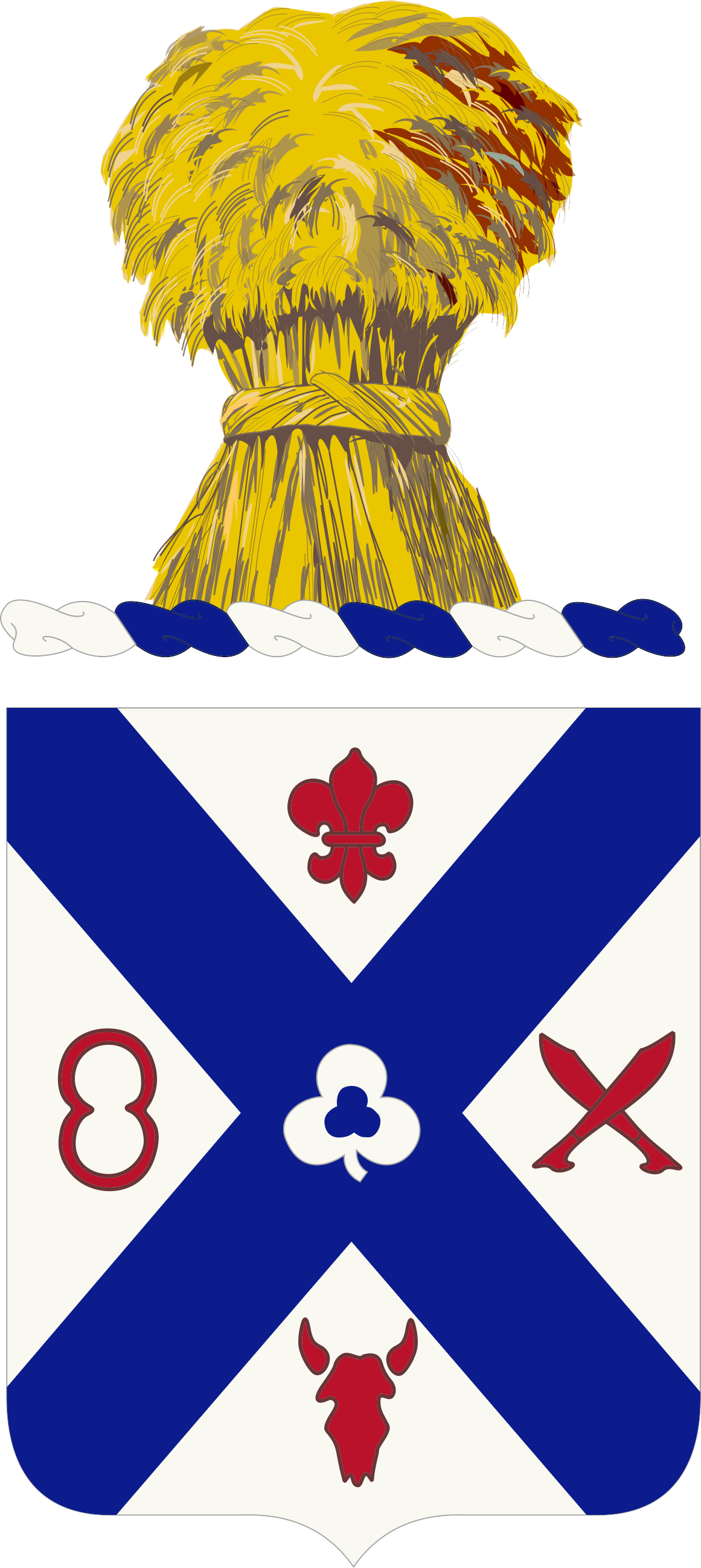
- Coat of arms
- Active: 1861
- Country: United States
- Branch: Minnesota Army National Guard
- Type: Infantry
- Size: Regiment
- Garrison/HQ: Mankato, Minnesota
- Motto: To The Last Man

Commanders
- Current commander: LTC Zachary Gauer
- Notable commanders: Robert W. Ward; Ashton H. Manhart; John M. Breit

Insignia
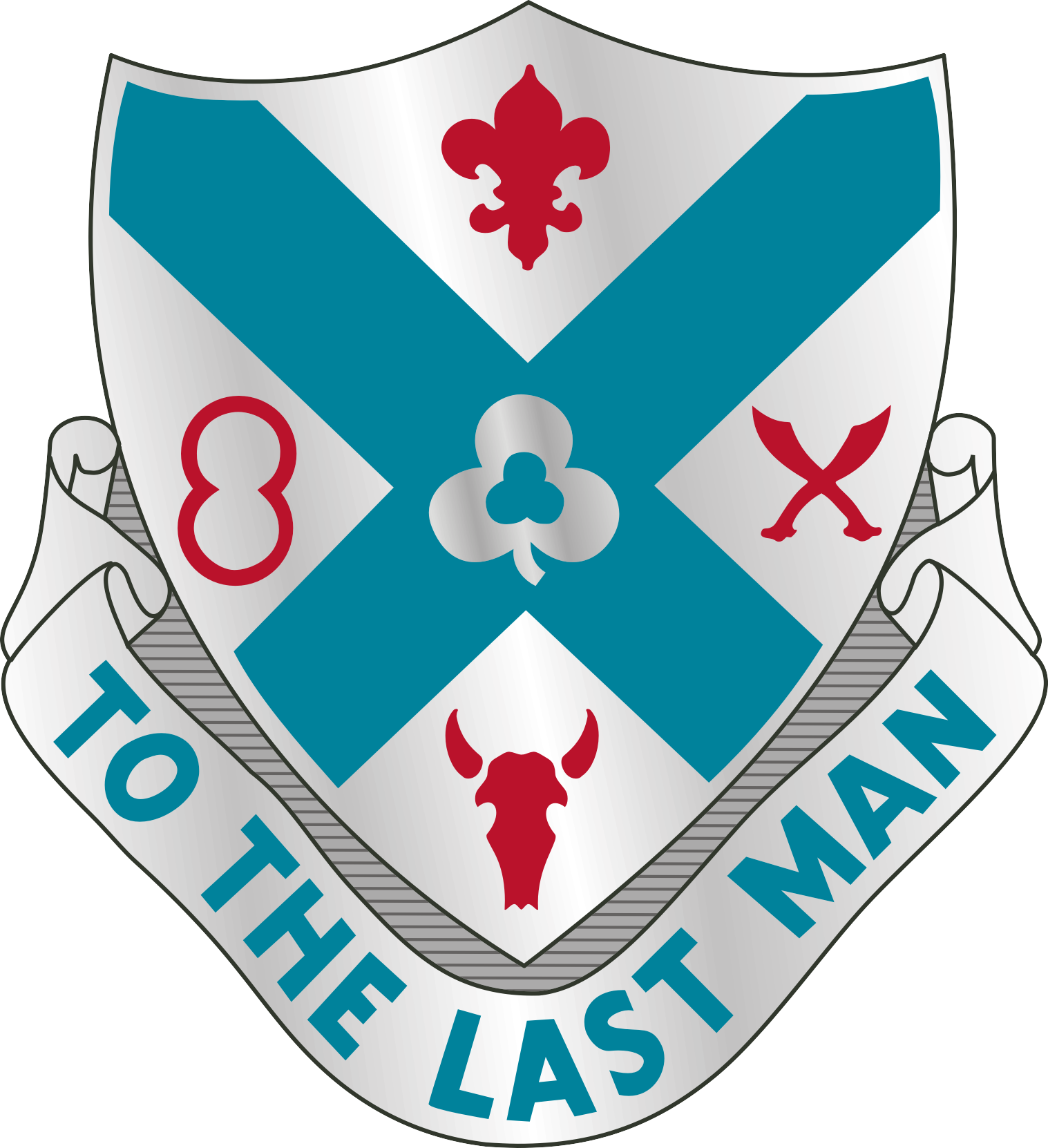
- Distinctive Unit Insignia

The 135th Infantry Regiment is an infantry regiment in the Minnesota Army National Guard.

During the Civil War, the 1st Minnesota Infantry Regiment, today the 2nd Battalion, 135th Infantry Regiment (2/135) was the first volunteer regiment to offer its services to President Lincoln. The men of the 1st Minnesota are most remembered for their actions on the late afternoon of 2 July 1863, during the second day's fighting at Gettysburg, resulting in the prevention of a serious breach in the Union defensive line on Cemetery Ridge.

During the battle, the regimental commander, Colonel William J. Colvill gave the order "To the last man", that became the regimental motto.

== Lineage ==
=== American Civil War ===
The 1st Minnesota Volunteer Infantry was organized on 27 April 1861 at Fort Snelling; Company A, Pioneer Guards, had been organized on 17 April 1856 at St. Paul. The regiment was mustered into federal service on 29 April 1861 for three years' service, and reorganized in April 1864 as the 1st Battalion, Minnesota Volunteer Infantry. It was expanded and redesignated as the 1st Regiment, Minnesota Volunteer Infantry, on 23 February 1865 and mustered out of federal service on 14 July 1865 at Jeffersonville, Indiana.

=== Postbellum ===
The regiment was reorganized in 1870 from men who were members of the Regimental Veterans' Association as the 1st Regiment, Minnesota Enrolled Militia. The Minnesota Enrolled Militia was redesignated on 1 March 1871 as the Minnesota National Guard. The unit was again reorganized in 1880 as the 1st Battalion, Minnesota National Guard, from the following companies:

- Company A from Minneapolis Light Infantry, organized 1879,
- Company B from Minneapolis Zouave Corps, organized 1879,
- Company C from St. Paul Guards, organized 1879,
- Company D from Allen Light Guards, organized 1879.

Expanded and redesignated in 1883 as the 1st Infantry Regiment, Minnesota National Guard.

=== Spanish-American War to World War I ===
For the Spanish-American War, the regiment was redesignated the 13th Minnesota Volunteer Infantry Regiment on 4 May 1898 and mustered into federal service at Camp Ramsey, St. Paul, Minnesota. It was mustered out of federal service on 3 October 1899 at San Francisco, California, and reorganized as the 1st Infantry Regiment, Minnesota National Guard, on 27 March 1900. It was mustered into federal service 30 June 1916 at Fort Snelling for the Pancho Villa Expedition, and mustered out 14 March 1917 at Fort Snelling. For World War I, the regiment was called into federal service on 25 March 1917, mustered in on 26 March 1917, and drafted into federal service on 5 August 1917. It was redesignated the 135th Infantry Regiment on 1 October 1917 and assigned to the 34th Division.

=== Interwar period ===
The 135th Infantry arrived at the port of New York on 24 January 1919 on the troopship USS General G. W. Goethals and was demobilized on 18 February 1919 at Camp Grant, Illinois. Per the National Defense Act of 1920, it was reconstituted in the National Guard in 1921, assigned to the 34th Division, and allotted to the state of Minnesota. Reorganized on 21 November 1921 by redesignation of the 1st Infantry, Minnesota National Guard (organized 1920–21; regimental headquarters organized on 6 January 1921 and federally recognized at Minneapolis) as the 135th Infantry. The regimental headquarters was successively relocated to Madison, Minnesota, on 29 October 1930, and back to Minneapolis on 16 November 1933. The regiment, or elements thereof, was called up to perform the following state duties: 1st Battalion to perform riot control during a railroad workers’ strike in northern Minnesota in August 1922 and October 1922; riot control during the Minneapolis general strike of 1934 in May 1934. It conducted annual summer training at Lake City, Minnesota; Fort Snelling, Minnesota; but most years at Camp Ripley, Minnesota. For at least three years, 1938–40, the regiment trained some 68 company-grade infantry officers of the Organized Reserve 88th Division at Camp Ripley. The 135th Infantry was inducted into active federal service on 10 February 1941 and moved to Camp Claiborne, Louisiana, where it arrived on 27 February 1941.

=== Cold War ===
- Inactivated 3 November 1945 at Camp Patrick Henry, Virginia
- Relieved from 34th Division and assigned to 47th Division 16 June 1946.
- Reorganized, less former companies of the 3rd Battalion, with headquarters at Mankato 23 September 1946

(3rd Battalion, 135th Infantry, hereafter separate lineage).

- Ordered into active federal service on 16 January 1951 at home stations. The 135th Infantry (NGUS) was organized and was federally recognized on 16 January 1953 with headquarters at Mankato, Minnesota.
- Released on 2 December 1954 from active Federal service and reverted to state control. Federal recognition was concurrently withdrawn from the 135th Infantry (NGUS).
- Reorganized on 22 February 1959 as a parent regiment under the Combat Arms Regimental System to consist of the 1st, 2nd, and 3rd Battle Groups, elements of the 47th Infantry Division.
- Reorganized on 1 April 1963 to consist of the 1st, 2nd, 3rd, and 4th Battalions, elements of the 47th Infantry Division.
- On 1 February 1968 it was reorganized again to consist of the 1st and 2nd Battalions, elements of the 47th Infantry Division.
- Withdrawn on 30 November 1988 from the Combat Arms Regimental System and reorganized under the United States Army Regimental System.
- 1st and 2nd Battalions, 135th Infantry were relieved on 10 February 1991 from assignment to the 47th Infantry Division and assigned to the 34th Infantry Division.
- Reorganized on 1 September 1992 to consist of the 2nd Battalion, an element of the 34th Infantry Division, and assigned to the 2nd Brigade, 34th Infantry Division as an air assault infantry battalion.
- Reassigned to the 1st Brigade Combat Team, 34th Infantry Division.

== Distinctive unit insignia ==
- Description

A silver color metal and enamel device 1 1/8 inches (2.9 cm) in height overall consisting of a shield blazoned: Argent, on a saltire Azure between in chief a fleur-de-lis Gules, in fess the Corps badge of the 2d Division, 8th Army Corps during the Spanish War Proper (two Silver circles overlapping each other one-third radius, resembling the figure "8") fringed of the third and two bolos saltirewise and in base a bull's skull of the like, the 2d Division, 2d Corps badge of the Civil War of the fourth (a Silver three-leaf clover with stem, voided). Attached below and to the sides of the shield a Silver scroll inscribed "TO THE LAST MAN" in blue letters.

- Symbolism

The shield is white (silver), the old Infantry colors. The blue saltire is taken from the Confederate flag - for Civil War service. At the battle of Gettysburg the 1st Minnesota Infantry Volunteers were in the 2d Division, 2d Corps (Hancock's), whose badge was the three-leaf clover. The figure "8" represents the Spanish War service and the crossed bolos the Philippine Insurrection service, while the fleur-de-lis represents World War I service of the 135th Infantry. The bull's skull (shoulder sleeve insignia of the 34th Division) indicates service with this division during the period of peace and through World War II.

- Background

The distinctive unit insignia was approved for the 135th Infantry Regiment on 18 June 1926. It was amended to show additional war service on 19 December 1951.

== Coat of arms ==
- Blazon
  - Shield: Argent, on a saltire Azure between in chief a fleur-de-lis Gules, in fess the Corps badge of the 2d Division, 8th Army Corps during the Spanish War Proper (two white circles overlapping each other one-third radius, resembling the figure "8") fringed of the third and two bolos saltirewise and in base a bull's skull of the like, the 2d Division, 2d Corps badge of the Civil War of the fourth (a white three-leaf clover with stem, voided).
  - Crest: That for the regiments and separate battalions of the Minnesota Army National Guard: On a wreath of the colors Argent and Azure, a sheaf of wheat Proper.
  - Motto: TO THE LAST MAN.
- Symbolism
  - Shield: The shield is white, the old Infantry colors. The blue saltire is taken from the Confederate flag - for Civil War service. At the battle of Gettysburg the 1st Minnesota Infantry Volunteers were in the 2d Division, 2d Corps (Hancock's), whose badge was the three-leaf clover. The figure "8" represents the Spanish War service and the crossed bolos the Philippine Insurrection service, while the fleur-de-lis represents World War I service of the 135th Infantry. The bull's skull (shoulder sleeve insignia of the 34th Division) indicates service with this division during the period of peace and through World War II.
  - Crest: The crest is that of the Minnesota Army National Guard.
- Background: The coat of arms was approved on 23 June 1926. It was amended to show additional war service on 19 December 1951.

== Campaign streamers ==
Civil War
- Bull Run
- Peninsula
- Valley
- Antietam
- Virginia 1861-1865
- Fredericksburg
- Gettysburg
- Petersburg
- Appomattox

Spanish War

- Manila

.

Philippine Insurrection

- Luzon
- San Isidro

World War I

- Streamer without inscription

World War II

- Tunisia
- Naples-Foggia
- Anzio
- Rome-Arno
- North Apennines
- Po Valley

== Decorations ==
- French Croix De Guerre with palm streamer embroidered BELVEDERE.
