= Attorney General Rogers (disambiguation) =

William P. Rogers (1913–2001) was Attorney General of the United States. Attorney General Rogers may also refer to:

- Byron G. Rogers (1900–1983), Attorney General of Colorado
- Horatio Rogers Jr. (1836–1904), Attorney General of Rhode Island
- John Rogers (Irish lawyer) (born 1947), Attorney General of Ireland
- Nancy H. Rogers (born 1948), Attorney General of Ohio
- Sion Hart Rogers (1825–1874), Attorney General of North Carolina

== See also ==
- General Rogers (disambiguation)
