= 816th Strategic Aerospace Division =

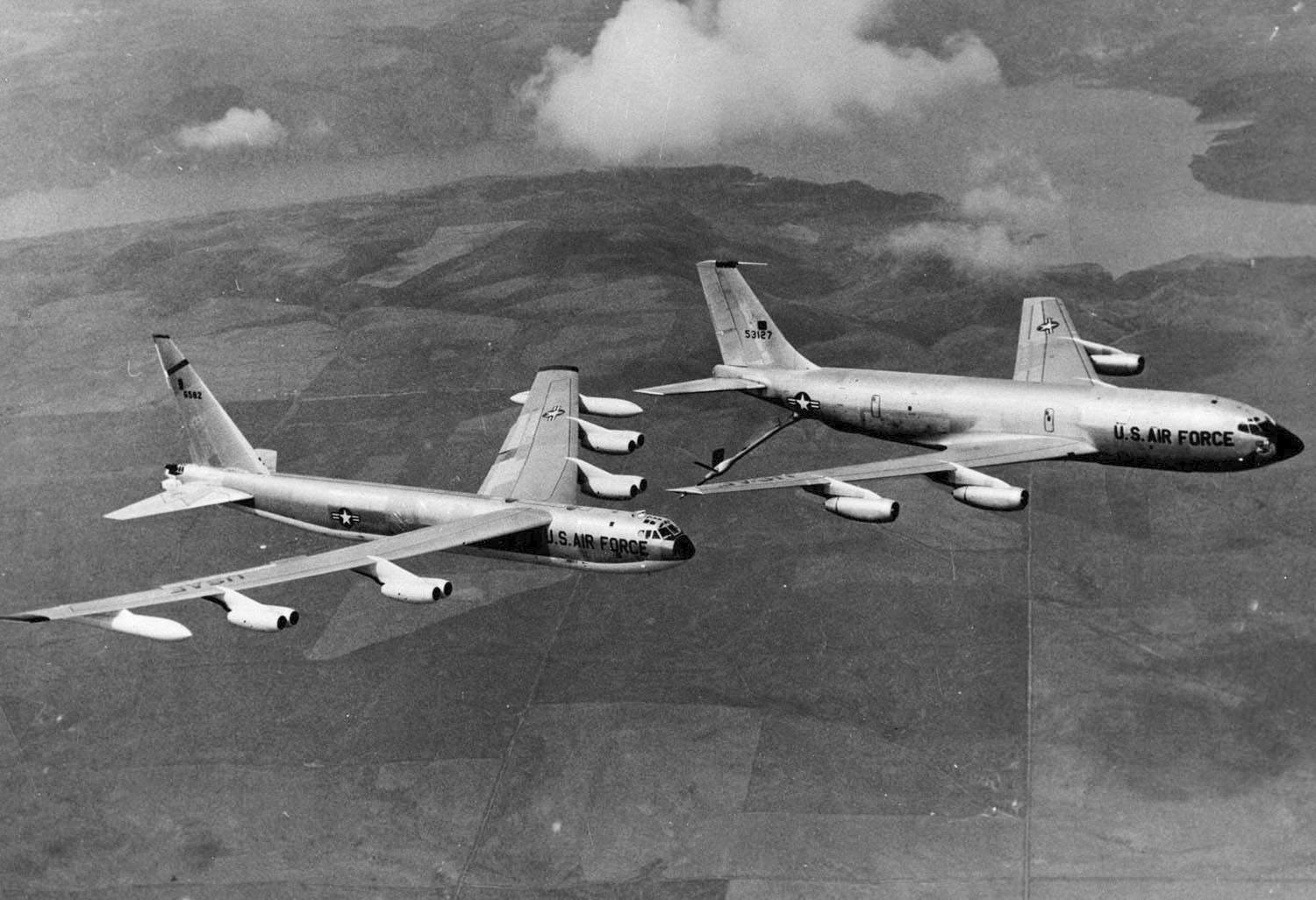
- Boeing KC-135 refueling a Boeing B-52
- Active: 1958–1965
- Country: United States
- Branch: United States Air Force
- Role: Command of strategic strike forces

Commanders
- 1 July 1958 – 1 September 1959: Brigadier General John S. Samuel
- 1 September 1959 – 7 September 1961: Brigadier General Howard W. Moore
- 7 September 1961 – 19 August 1964: Major General William B. Campbell
- 19 August 1964 – 1 July 1965: Brigadier General Everett W. Holstrom

Insignia
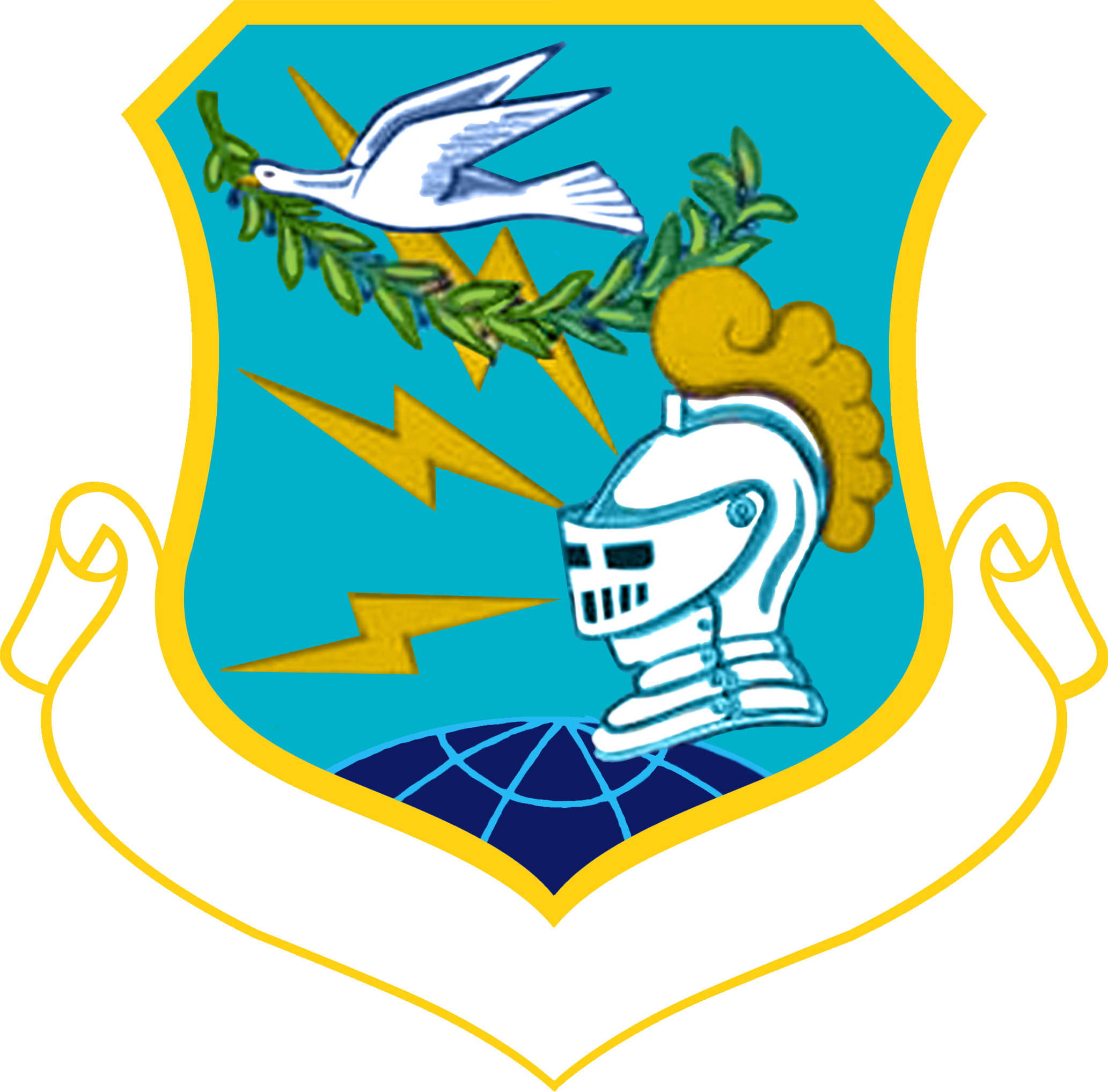
- 816th Strategic Aerospace Division emblem (Note: Approved 26 April 1960. Description: Light blue, issuant from base, portion of a globe azure with grid lines of the first [color mentioned] surmounted to sinister by a knight's helmet argent plumed or and in dexter flank three lightning flashes of the last [color mentioned] radiated from sinister nombril in chief a dove volant carrying in its beak an olive branch, all within a diminished border of the fourth [color mentioned].)

The 816th Strategic Aerospace Division is an inactive United States Air Force organization. Its last assignment was with Second Air Force at Altus Air Force Base, Oklahoma, where it was inactivated on 1 July 1965.

The division was activated in 1958 as the 816th Air Division, an operational headquarters for three dispersed wings flying Boeing B-52 Stratofortress and Boeing KC-135 Stratotanker aircraft from bases in Texas and Oklahoma. In 1961 it added a squadron of SM-65 Atlas missiles and a year later was renamed the 816th Strategic Aerospace Division to reflect its control of missile and bomber forces. The division continued this role until inactivation in 1965, when Strategic Air Command realigned its command structure.

== History ==
The 816th Air Division was activated at Altus Air Force Base, Oklahoma in the summer of 1958 as an operational headquarters for dispersed Strategic Air Command (SAC) wings. During the late 1950s, SAC dispersed its Boeing B-52 Stratofortress bombers over a larger number of bases, thus making it more difficult for the Soviet Union to knock out the entire fleet with a surprise first strike. The division initially commanded only the 11th Bombardment Wing, which had moved to Altus from Carswell Air Force Base, Texas six months earlier, and was beginning to re-equip with B-52s and Boeing KC-135 Stratotankers. Initially, the division and the wing shared the same commander. In September, the 4123d Air Base Group was organized at Clinton-Sherman Air Force Base, Oklahoma and assigned to the division. This group's mission was to prepare the former Naval Air Station for the arrival of operational aircraft the following year.

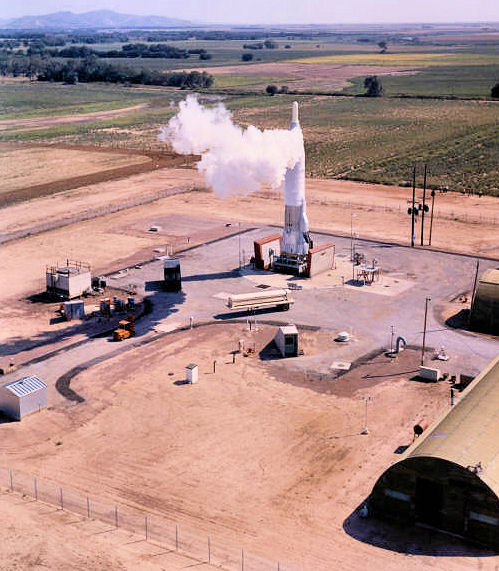
577th Strategic Missile Squadron SM-65 Atlas at Willow OK site

In early 1959, the division assumed command of two strategic wings, the 4245th, which was assigned in January when it organized at Sheppard Air Force Base, Texas, and the 4123d, assigned in March, shortly after it moved from Carswell to Clinton-Sherman. The 4123d Air Base Group was assigned from the division to this wing on the same day the wing became part of the 816th. Each of the division's wings had one B-52 squadron and one KC-135 squadron assigned. (Note: The 11th Wing initially had two B-52 squadrons, but once the 42d Bombardment Squadron was trained, it was moved to Wright-Patterson Air Force Base. Maurer, Combat Squadrons, pp. 193–194.) (Note: During the two months the 96th Air Refueling squadron was inactive in 1960, the 11th Wing also had two air refueling squadrons, but they were not fully organized before the 96th was reactivated and assigned their personnel and aircraft. Robertson, Patsy (3 April 2014). "Factsheet 96 Air Refueling Squadron (AMC)". Air Force Historical Research Agency. Archived from the original on 13 May 2014..) The division conducted training in strategic air warfare on a global scale from 1958 to 1965. Starting in 1960, one third of the aircraft assigned to the division's wings were maintained on fifteen-minute alert, fully fueled and ready for combat to reduce vulnerability to a Soviet missile strike. This was increased to half the wings' aircraft in 1962. Starting in November 1961, the division's wings began flying Operation Chrome Dome airborne alert missions as well. The Chrome Dome concept had been tested by the division's 4123d Strategic Wing, augmented by crews from its 11th Bombardment Wing under the name Operation High Trip.

In June 1961, the 11th Wing was assigned a squadron equipped with the SM-65 Atlas missiles. In the spring of 1962, SAC units with responsibility for both bomber and missile forces were renamed to include the term aerospace in their designations. The 816th became the 816th Strategic Aerospace Division, while its 11th wWng became the 11th Strategic Aerospace Wing.

In February 1963, the 70th and 494th Bombardment Wings assumed the aircraft, personnel and equipment of the discontinued 4123d and 4245th Strategic Wings. The strategic wings were Major Command controlled (MAJCON) wings, which could not carry a permanent history or lineage, and SAC replaced them with a permanent units.

The division was inactivated in June 1965 when SAC realigned its command structure as B-52s began to be retired from the inventory, and its component wings were assigned to other divisions.

== Lineage ==
- Constituted as the 816th Air Division on 20 May 1958

Activated on 1 July 1958
Redesignated 816th Strategic Aerospace Division on 1 April 1962
Discontinued and inactivated on 1 July 1965

=== Assignments ===
- Second Air Force, 1 July 1958 – 1 July 1965

=== Stations ===
- Altus Air Force Base, Oklahoma, 1 July 1958 – 1 July 1965

=== Components ===
Wings

- 11th Bombardment Wing (later 11th Strategic Aerospace wing): 1 July 1958 – 1 July 1965
- 70th Bombardment Wing: 1 February 1963 – 1 July 1965

Clinton-Sherman Air Force Base, Oklahoma

- 494th Bombardment Wing: 1 February 1963 – 1 July 1963, 1 July 1964 – 1 July 1965

Sheppard Air Force Base, Texas

- 4123d Strategic Wing: 1 March 1959 – 1 February 1963

Clinton-Sherman Air Force Base, Oklahoma

- 4245 Strategic Wing: 5 January 1959 – 1 February 1963

Sheppard Air Force Base, Texas

Groups

- 4123d Air Base Group: 9 September 1958 – 1 March 1959

Other

- 4037th USAF Hospital: 1 July 1958 – 1 March 1959

=== Aircraft ===
- Boeing B-52 Stratofortress, 1958–1965
- Boeing KC-97 Stratofreighter, 1958–1961
- Boeing KC-135 Stratotanker, 1958–1965
- Boeing B-47 Stratojet, 1961–1962.

Boeing RB-47 Stratojet, 1958–1962

- SM-65 Atlas, 1961–1965

== See also ==
- List of United States Air Force air divisions
- List of USAF Bomb Wings and Wings assigned to Strategic Air Command
- List of USAF Strategic Wings assigned to the Strategic Air Command
- List of MAJCOM wings of the United States Air Force
- List of B-47 units of the United States Air Force
- List of B-52 Units of the United States Air Force
