= John S. Samuel =

United States Air Force general (1913–2002)

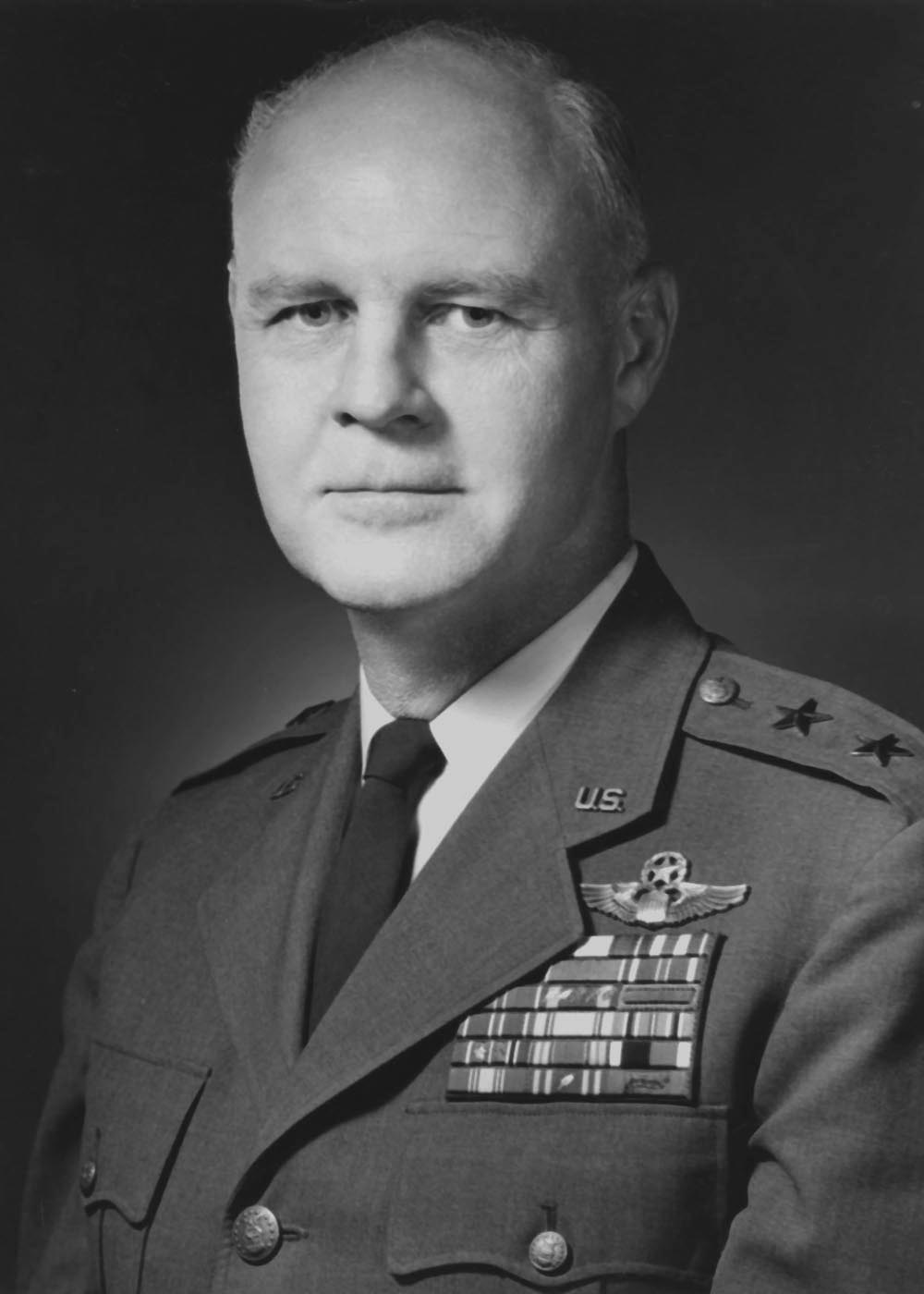
- Born: December 24, 1913; St. Louis, Missouri
- Died: April 4, 2002 (aged 88)
- Military career
- Allegiance: United States
- Branch: United States Air Force
- Service years: 1935–1974
- Rank: Major general (Ret.)
- Commands: Lowry Technical Training Center; Lackland AFB; Air Force Office of Special Investigations; 825th Air Division; 816th Air Division; 11th Bombardment Wing; 19th Air Division; Carswell AFB; 322d Bombardment Group
- Awards: Distinguished Service Medal; Silver Star Medal; Legion of Merit; Distinguished Flying Cross; Bronze Star Medal; Air Medal; French Croix de Guerre

John Spoor Samuel (December 24, 1913 – April 1, 2002) was a major general in the United States Air Force. Samuel was born in St. Louis, Missouri. He attended Beloit College from 1932 to 1935.

== Military career ==
Samuel graduated from the United States Military Academy in 1939. During World War II he served with the 391st Bombardment Group and later was given command of the 322d Bombardment Group. Conflicts he took part in include the Invasion of Normandy, the Allied advance from Paris to the Rhine, the Battle of the Bulge, and the Western Allied invasion of Germany. Following the war he became an instructor at the United States Military Academy and later was assigned to The Pentagon. Later he was given command of Carswell Air Force Base, the 816th Air Division, and helped conduct Operation Dominic I and II. In 1963, he was named director of the U.S. Air Force Office of Special Investigations. Later he was assigned to the Office of the United States Secretary of Defense. His retirement was effective as of August 1, 1972.

=== Major awards and decorations ===
Samuel is the recipient of the following:

1st Row	Distinguished Service Medal		
2nd Row	Silver Star Medal	Legion of Merit	Distinguished Flying Cross
3rd Row	Bronze Star Medal	Air Medal with two silver and three bronze oak leaf clusters	French Croix de Guerre

U.S. Air Force Command Pilot Badge

== Notes ==
Military offices
Preceded by BG Robert F. Burnham	Commander of the Air Force Office of Special Investigations; Jun 1963 – May 1964	Succeeded by BG Joseph J. Cappucci
