= Francis R. Dillon =

United States Air Force Brigadier General (1939–2023)

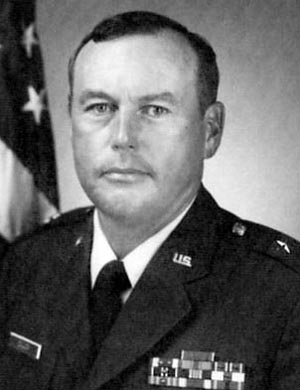
- Born: November 3, 1939
- Died: July 5, 2023 (aged 83)
- Military career
- Allegiance: United States
- Branch: United States Air Force
- Service years: 1962–1993
- Rank: Brigadier general (Ret.)
- Commands: Air Force Office of Special Investigations
- Awards: Legion of Merit; Meritorious Service Medal; Air Force Commendation Medal; National Defense Service Medal

Francis R. Dillon (November 3, 1939 – July 5, 2023) was a United States Air Force brigadier general (Special Agent) who served as the 11th Commander of the Air Force Office of Special Investigations (AFOSI), Bolling AFB, Washington, D.C. As the AFOSI Commander, Dillon was responsible for providing commanders of all Air Force activities independent professional investigative services regarding fraud, counterintelligence and major criminal matters by using a worldwide network of agents stationed at all major Air Force installations and a variety of special operating locations.

== Education ==
Through the Reserve Officer Training Corps, Dillon earned a Bachelor of Science degree from the University of Connecticut. Dillon also has a master's degree from Troy State University. He also completed courses at Squadron Officer School, Air Command and Staff College, Air War College, and the Defense Language Institute.

== Military career ==
Upon graduation from the University of Connecticut, Dillon commissioned into the United States Air Force in 1968. He spent the majority of his career as a special agent of the AFOSI, where he conducted and supervised felony-level criminal, fraud, and counterintelligence investigations and operations. He commanded at the detachment, squadron and wing levels. His assignments included two overseas postings, which were Munich and Wiesbaden, Germany. Additionally, Dillon served as an assistant professor of aerospace studies with the Air Force Reserve Officer Training Corps at Rutgers University, New Brunswick, N.J. Prior to his last assignment as Commander of AFOSI, Dillon served as the Vice Commander of AFOSI.

As Commander of AFOSI, Dillon was interviewed by The Washington Post about an Air Force captain allegedly spying for U.S. adversaries in West Berlin, Germany. When asked by reporters to clarify if an investigation was ongoing, Dillon told reporters, "This was very premature, this should have never been leaked out." Pentagon officials also described previous news reports on the matter, as premature and misleading; however, an Air Force spokesperson emphasized a "full and thorough investigation" of the matter was under way.

== Post-military ==
After retiring, Dillon published a book, served on local community boards, and lobbied members of the U.S. Congress to name a few. For instance, Dillon published Vacationland Terrorists: Alarm in the Countryside in 2014. Additionally, he served on the Bath Housing Authority Board of Directors with a term that expired in 2021. Dillon, along with several other retired military generals, supported the "2010 Healthy, Hunger-Free Kids Act" and urged members of Congress to refrain from pursuing any mechanism that would weaken or delay its standards.

Dillon died on July 5, 2023, at the age of 83.

=== Major awards and decorations ===
Dillon was the recipient of the following:

1st Row	Legion of Merit		
2nd Row	Meritorious Service Medal with two oak leaf clusters	Air Force Commendation Medal	National Defense Service Medal with bronze star

== See also ==
- List of Commanders of the Air Force Office of Special Investigations

== Notes ==
Military offices
Preceded by BG Richard S. Beyea Jr.	Commander of the Air Force Office of Special Investigations; February 1988 – April 1993	Succeeded by BG Robert A. Hoffmann
