= Richard S. Beyea Jr. =

Retired American United States Air Force Brigadier General (Special Agent)

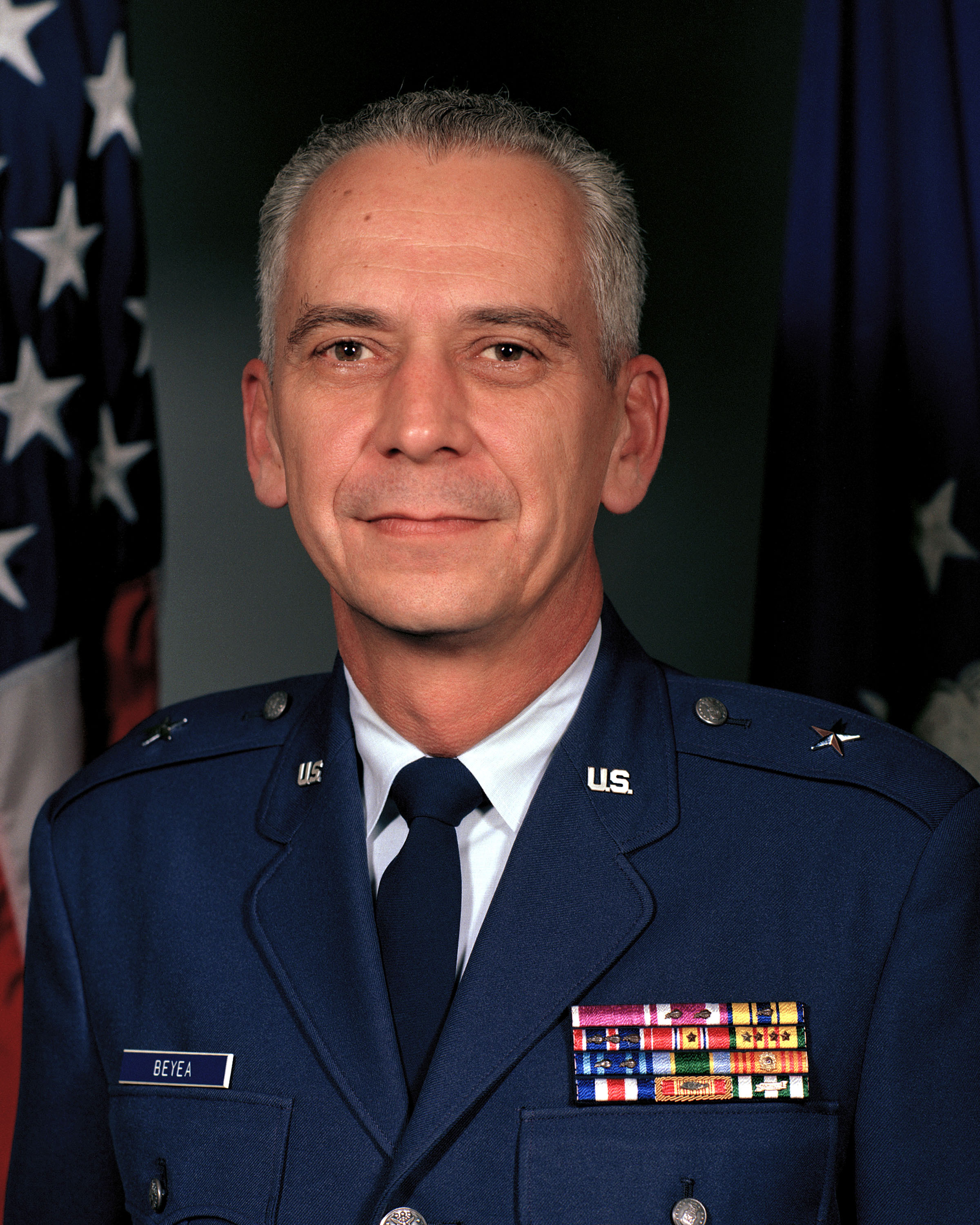
- Born: 22 September 1935 (age 91); Atlanta, Georgia
- Military career
- Allegiance: United States
- Branch: United States Air Force
- Service years: 1958–1988
- Rank: Brigadier General (Ret.)
- Commands: Air Force Office of Special Investigations
- Conflicts: Vietnam War
- Awards: Legion of Merit; Meritorious Service Medal; Air Force Commendation Medal; National Defense Service Medal; Vietnam Service Medal; Vietnam Gallantry Cross; Vietnam Campaign Medal

Richard Swinney Beyea Jr. (born 22 September 1935) is a retired United States Air Force brigadier general (special agent) who served as the 10th commander of the Air Force Office of Special Investigations (AFOSI), Bolling AFB, Washington D.C. As the AFOSI Commander, Beyea was responsible for providing independent professional investigative services to commanders of all Air Force activities about fraud, counterintelligence and major criminal matters by using a worldwide network of agents stationed at all major Air Force installations and at a variety of special operating locations. He also served as the air staff assistant inspector general for special investigations.

== Early life and education ==
Born in Atlanta, Georgia and raised in Texas, Beyea graduated from Highland Park High School in 1953 and then attended Texas A&M University for a year. In 1958, he earned a Bachelor of Science degree from the U.S. Military Academy, West Point, New York. Beyea also obtained a master's degree in criminal justice from George Washington University, Washington, D.C, in 1974. Along with specialized training, Beyea completed Squadron Officer School at Maxwell Air Force Base, AL; Industrial College of the Armed Forces and National War College, both located at Fort Lesley J. McNair, Washington, D.C.

== Military career ==
Upon graduation from the U.S. Military Academy, Beyea commissioned into the United States Air Force in 1958. He spent the majority of his career as a special agent of the AFOSI where he conducted and supervised felony-level criminal, fraud, and counterintelligence investigations and operations. He commanded at the detachment, squadron and wing levels. His assignments included four overseas postings, which were Bangkok, Thailand; Kadena AB, Japan; and RAF Fairford and RAF Alconbury, England. Prior to his last assignment as Commander of AFOSI, Beyea served as the deputy commander of the 18th Combat Support Group, and subsequently became base commander. Near the end of his military career, Beyea was awarded the prestigious Order of the Sword in 1987, which is the highest honor and tribute noncommissioned officers can bestow upon an individual.

=== Major awards and decorations ===
Beyea is the recipient of the following:

1st Row	Legion of Merit		
2nd Row	Meritorious Service Medal with two oak leaf clusters	Air Force Commendation Medal with oak leaf cluster	National Defense Service Medal with service star
3rd Row	Vietnam Service Medal with eight service stars	Republic of Vietnam Gallantry Cross with palm	Vietnam Campaign Medal

== See also ==
- List of Commanders of the Air Force Office of Special Investigations

== Notes ==
Military offices
Preceded by BG Forest A. Singhoff	Commander of the Air Force Office of Special Investigations; Jun 1980 – Feb 1988	Succeeded by BG Francis R. Dillon
