= Joseph J. Cappucci =

United States Air Force general (1913–1992)

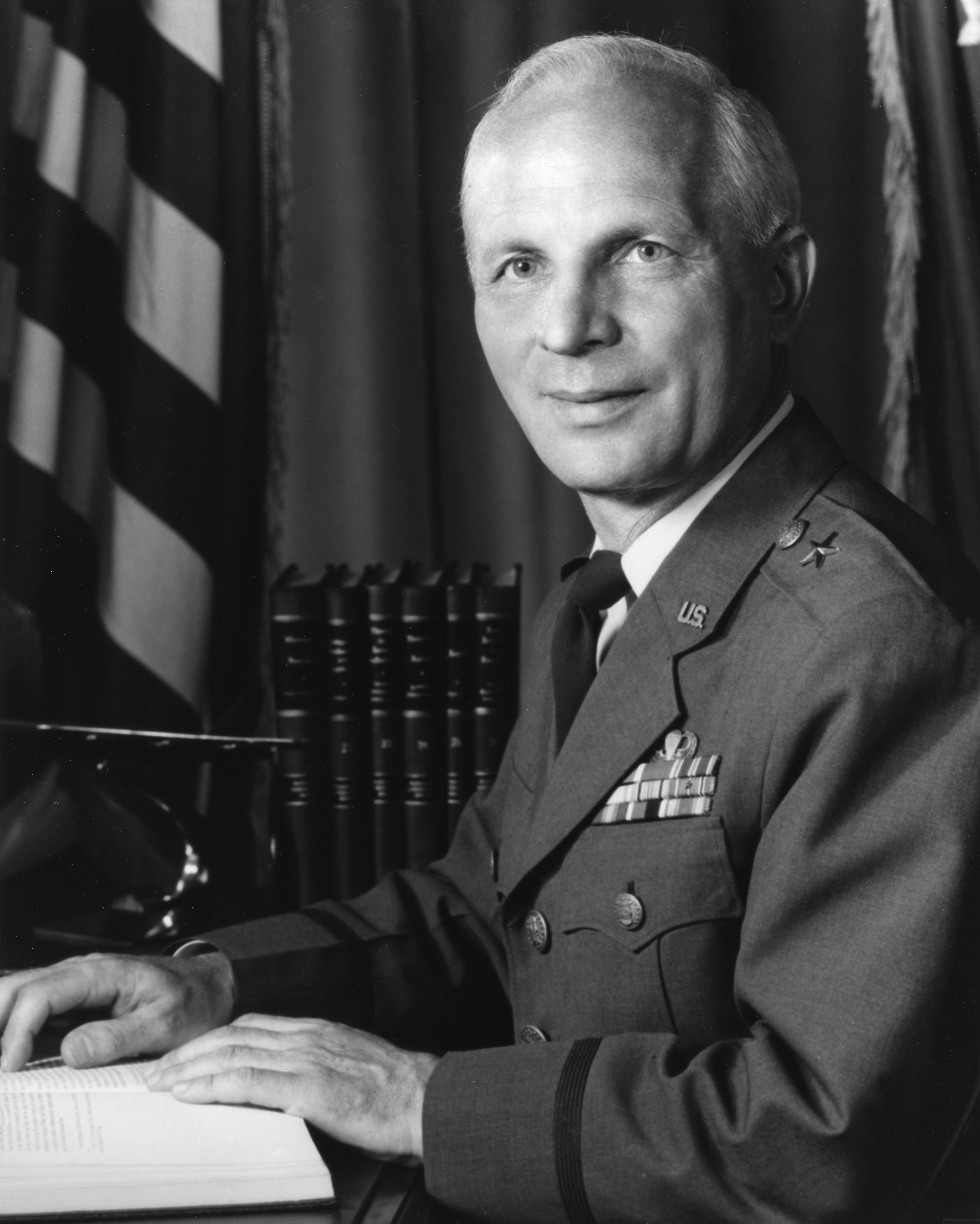
- Born: January 1, 1913; Bridgeport, Connecticut, United States
- Died: June 10, 1992 (aged 79); Falls Church, Virginia, United States
- Burial place: Arlington National Cemetery
- Military career
- Allegiance: United States
- Branch: United States Air Force
- Service years: 1935–1974
- Rank: Brigadier general (Ret.)
- Commands: Defense Security Service; Air Force Office of Special Investigations
- Awards: 8 major decorations: Distinguished Service Medal; Legion of Merit; Vietnamese Medal of Honor; Philippine Legion of Honor; Philippine Legion of Honor (Commander); Thailand Order of the White Elephant; Vietnam Distinguished Service Order; Republic of China Order of the Cloud and Banner

Joseph J. Cappucci (1 January 1913 – 10 June 1992) was a U.S. Air Force brigadier general (Special Agent) who served as the first director of the Defense Investigative Service and the 6th Commander of the Air Force Office of Special Investigations (AFOSI or OSI). As the Defense Investigative Service director, he oversaw its tasks of facilitating personnel security investigations, supervising industrial security, and performing security education and awareness training. As the AFOSI commander, he was responsible for providing independent professional investigative services to commanders of all U.S. Air Force activities about fraud, counterintelligence and major criminal matters by using a worldwide network of agents stationed at all major Air Force installations and at a variety of special operating locations. He also served as the director of special investigations within the Office of the Inspector General of the U.S. Air Force while commanding AFOSI.

== Education ==
Cappucci graduated from University of Wyoming in June 1935. Besides the Command and General Staff School, he also attended the U.S. Air Force Special Investigations School, British Secret Intelligence School, Air Intelligence School, Radar Observer Intelligence School and the Airborne School, and holds the ratings of parachutist and gliderman.

== Military career ==
Upon graduation from the Reserve Officers Training Corps program, Cappucci commissioned as a second lieutenant into the U.S. Army Air Corps Reserve. Early in his career, Cappucci performed duties as a counterintelligence and intelligence officer. He was also placed on special duty with the British Intelligence Service and provided detached service to the Central Intelligence Agency. Cappucci assignments included an overseas posting at the Directorate of Special Investigations, U.S. Air Forces Europe (USAFE), where he served as chief of the Counterintelligence Division. While in USAFE, he was a member of various intelligence boards in Germany, France and other areas in USAFE, and was responsible for putting into effect a counterintelligence program throughout all USAFE areas of interest. Cappucci would go on to lead other divisions and commanded at the wing-level. Prior to his assignment as Commander of AFOSI, Cappucci served as the director of special investigations within the Office of the Inspector General of the U.S. Air Force and commanded the 1005th Special Investigations Group, which was a worldwide centrally directed organization. After commanding AFOSI, Cappucci was appointed the first director of the Defense Investigative Service, which was his last assignment.

=== President Kennedy assassination conspiracy theory ===
In the late 1960s, Cappucci was commander of the 1005th Special Investigations Group, which gave him access to many individuals in the intelligence community including a close and long-term relationship with former FBI director J. Edgar Hoover. During a dinner at a hotel in Rome, Italy, with Lieutenant Colonel William H. Amos and his wife, Cappuci talked at length about inside knowledge of Mary Jo Kopechne's death inside of former Senator Ted Kennedy's car at Chappaquiddick Island, MA. It became clear to Mrs. Amos, Cappucci obtained inside information about the investigation of the accident from Hoover and how Ms. Kopechne's parents agreed to a settlement with Senator Kennedy to remain silent. Afterwards, the conversation turned to former President John F. Kennedy's assassination wherein Cappucci told the couple, "it was no wonder LBJ had JFK killed." After the dinner, Lt Col Amos told his wife to never repeat what Cappucci said, which she did for nearly 50 years.

=== Major awards and decorations ===
Cappucci is the recipient of the following:

1st Row	Air Force Distinguished Service Medal with two oak leaf clusters		Legion of Merit with two oak leaf clusters
2nd Row	Vietnamese Medal of Honor, 1st Class	Philippine Legion of Honor	Philippine Legion of Honor, Commander
3rd Row	Thailand Order of the White Elephant, 2nd Class-Knight Commander	Republic of Vietnam Air Force Distinguished Service Order, 1st Class	Republic of China Special Cravat of the Order of Cloud and Banner

- National Order of Vietnam in grade of Knight
- Vietnamese Air Service Honor Medal
- Republic of China Police Medal
- Republic of China Order of National Security Merit Cheon-Su Medal

== Personal life ==
Cappucci was married to his wife, the former Barbara Wade Gibson, of Falls Church, Virginia, for 50 years until he died at the age of 79 to cancer. They are buried together at Arlington National Cemetery.

== See also ==
- List of Commanders of the Air Force Office of Special Investigations

Military offices
Preceded by Position established	Director of the Defense Investigative Service; 1972–1976	Succeeded by Bernard J. O'Donnell
Preceded by BG John S. Samuel	Commander of the Air Force Office of Special Investigations; 1964–1972	Succeeded by MG William A. Temple
