= Robert F. Burnham =

Retired American United States Air Force brigadier general

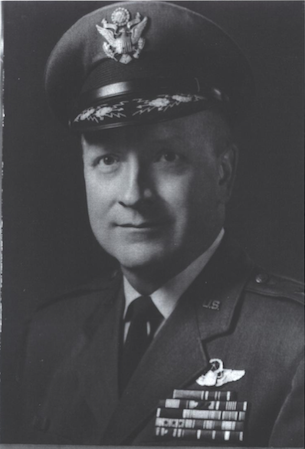
- Born: March 7, 1913; Battle Creek, Michigan, US
- Died: January 16, 1969 (aged 55); Bexar County, Texas, US
- Burial place: Fort Sam Houston National Cemetery
- Military career
- Allegiance: United States
- Branch: United States Air Force
- Service years: 1937–1966
- Rank: Brigadier general (Ret.)
- Commands: Air Force Office of Special Investigations; Air Police; Lockbourne Air Force Base; 307th Bombardment Group
- Conflicts: World War II

Robert Francis Burnham (March 7, 1913 – January 16, 1969) was a brigadier general in the U.S. Air Force who served as a group commander of the 307th Bombardment Group; base commander of Lockbourne AFB, OH; provost marshal of the Air Police; and the 4th Commander of the Air Force Office of Special Investigations (AFOSI or OSI).

== Military career ==
Burnham was appointed a cadet to the U.S. Coast Guard Academy, which he entered in June 1930. In 1933, he resigned to apply for appointment as a flying cadet, U.S. Army Air Corps. He was appointed a flying cadet in February 1935, at which time he entered training at Randolph Field, Texas. He graduated as a rated pilot from Kelly Field, Texas, in February 1936. Afterwards, he was assigned to the 97th Operations Squadron, Mitchel Field, New York, as a flying cadet, in conformance with the personnel policy of those years which required an additional year of duty as a flying cadet subsequent to graduation and prior to commissioning. On March 1, 1937, he was commissioned a second lieutenant, U.S. Army Air Corps Reserve.

Aside from his flying career, Burnham assisted in the establishment of the Air University as deputy chief of staff, Air University secretary, and chief of the academic staff. In 1948, he entered the Air War College as a student. In 1952, Burnham entered the National War College and graduated in July 1953. From 1953 to 1957, he was assigned to various staff positions, including duty as an executive to the Under Secretary of the Air Force. By 1959, he was promoted to brigadier general for duty as the Air Provost Marshal. Then in June 1962, Burham was appointed director of special investigations, (The Inspector General.)

== Personal life ==
Burnham was the son of Grover and Elizabeth (Stampfler) Burnham, and he had a brother, Burl C. Burnham. He married Doris Johnston Quig in 1967. Burnham died on January 16, 1969, at the age of 55.

== See also ==
- List of Commanders of the Air Force Office of Special Investigations
- U.S. Air Force Office of Special Investigations (AFOSI or OSI)
- U.S. Air Force Security Forces

Military offices
Preceded by MG John Martin Breit	Commander of the Air Force Office of Special Investigations; Jun 1962 – Jun 1963	Succeeded by MG John S. Samuel
Preceded by MG Joseph V. Dillon	Air Provost Marshal; Jul 1959 – Jun 1962	Succeeded by COL A. T. Learnard
