= Elmer J. Rogers Jr. =

United States Air Force general

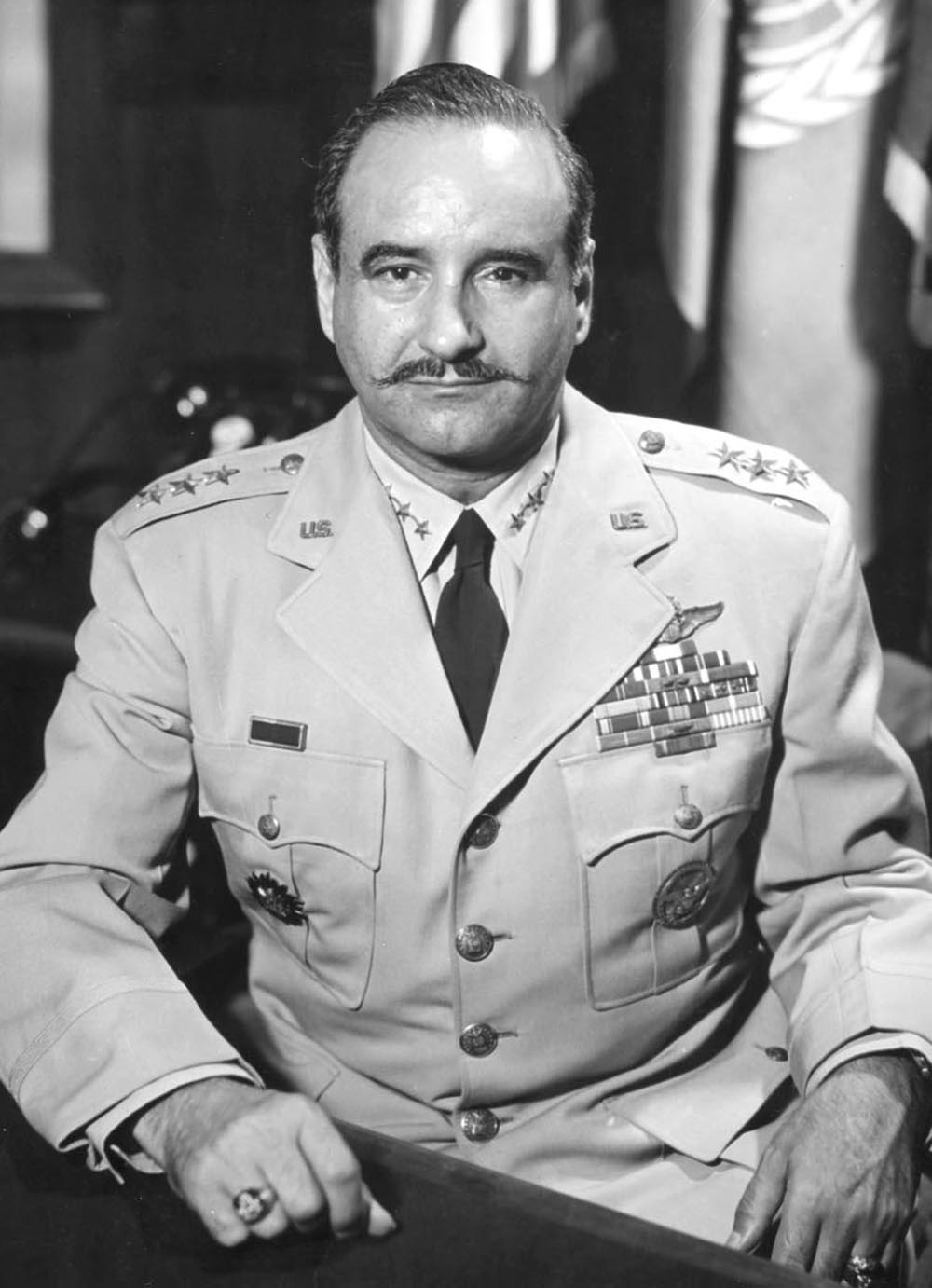
- Born: October 12, 1903; Taunton, Massachusetts
- Died: June 30, 2002 (aged 98); Arlington, Virginia
- Burial place: Arlington National Cemetery, Arlington, Virginia
- Spouse(s): Dorothy Rogers (divorced); Wilma Rebecca Hague Rogers, colonel, Women's Army Corps
- Military career
- Allegiance: United States of America
- Branch: United States Air Force
- Service years: 1926–1961
- Rank: Lieutenant general
- Nickname: "Rod"
- Awards: Distinguished Service Medal, Silver Star, Legion of Merit, Distinguished Flying Cross, Bronze Star Medal, Air Medal with two oak leaf clusters, Purple Heart, Presidential Unit Citation

Elmer Joseph Rogers Jr. (October 12, 1903 – June 30, 2002) was a United States Air Force lieutenant general.

== Biography ==
Rogers was born at Taunton, Massachusetts in 1903. His father was Elmer J. Rogers Sr., the president of the Standard Piston Ring Company, and his mother was Matilda Martell Rogers, a housewife. General Rogers was the oldest of three children, followed by a brother, Emeric, who became a firefighter in Quincy, Massachusetts, and a sister, Barbara, who graduated from the Brigham & Women's Hospital nursing program and then became a home care nurse in Connecticut. After graduating as class valedictorian from high school in Quincy, Massachusetts, in 1920, he attended the Emerson Institute and later studied at Harvard University. He was fluent in French and German at this time.

Appointed a flying cadet in March 1924, Rogers entered Primary Flying School at Brooks Field, Texas, graduated from Advanced Flying School at Kelly Field, Texas, on March 14, 1925, and was commissioned a second lieutenant in the Air Service Reserve. On June 30, 1926, he received his regular commission as a second lieutenant of Air Corps.

With permission from the U.S. Army-Air Force, Rogers flew a plane for stunt shots in Wings. The scene called for him to do some loops, and then pose after a crash as if dying, complete with blood dripping down his face, from his nose and mouth.

Assigned as a squadron adjutant, a year later Rogers became a flying instructor at Brooks and Kelly fields, successively. Entering the Air Corps Technical School at Chanute Field, Ill., in September 1932. He graduated the following June.

He acquired the moniker of "Rod" due to the rod-shaped control stick of the planes he learned to fly. It had nothing to do with his surname, which had no "d" in it.

Going to Hawaii, Rogers served with the Fourth Observation Squadron at Luke Field, and in June 1935 was transferred to the 18th Composite Ting at Fort Shafter. The following April he went to Barksdale Field, Louisiana, for duty with the Third Attack Group.

Graduating from the Air Corps Tactical School in 1939, Rogers was assigned as an instructor with the Georgia National Guard. Joining the War Department General Staff in August 1941, he was appointed a courier of the Combined Subject Section of the Strategy and Policy Group, War Plans Division, later becoming chief of the section. In January 1943, he moved to Tampa, Florida, as deputy chief of staff of the Third Air Force.

The following August, Rogers assumed command of the 465th Bomb Group at McCook Field, Neb., taking it to the Mediterranean Theater in February 1944. On March 2, he was wounded in action and hospitalized. Released from the hospital on May 14, 1944, the general was named commanding officer of the 97th Bomb Group in that theater. In August, he became deputy assistant chief of staff for operations of the 15th Air Force, and two months later was appointed assistant chief of staff for operations of the Mediterranean Allied Strategic Air Force. This latter assignment was in addition to a corresponding position he already occupied in the 15th Air Force. In June 1945, Rogers became the chief of staff of the 15th Air force and assumed command of that organization September 1, 1945.

During World War II, his fluency in French and German was of great use to him, as he fought in the European Theater of Operations. He would get up at 3 a.m., hear Hitler screaming on the radio that the Nazis would “get that Colonel Rogers” (Hitler actually knew his name!), and then fly off to bomb the Ploiești oil field in Romania, which supplied the Nazi Panzerwaffe tanks. It was on the return from one of these bombing runs that he and his crew of 9 plus an engineer were shot down over the east coast of Italy. A British motorboat picked them up - and he was the last person to be fished out of the water. Then-Colonel Rogers's right foot had been shot through, but he recovered and continued to fight.

Returning to the United States, Rogers joined the Air Force headquarters at Washington, D.C., in December 1945 as chief of the Policy Division in the Office of the Assistant Chief of Air Staff for Plans. Entering the National War College at Washington, D.C., in August 1947, he graduated the next June and was assigned to the Alaskan Command at Fort Richardson, Alaska, to become director of plans and operations. Hospitalized in November 1948, Rogers returned the following May to the Alaskan Command in the same capacity, remaining there until December 1950.

In December, the general became the Air Force member on the Joint Strategic Survey Committee, Office of the Joint Chiefs of Staff in Washington, D.C.

In September 1953, Rogers was appointed operations officer of the Far East Command at Tokyo, Japan, and on July 15, 1954, was named deputy chief of staff for plans of the Far East Command. He was designated chief of staff, Far East Command, and United Nations Command, on April 26, 1955.

Following that assignment, Rogers was appointed Inspector General of the Air Force, Washington, D.C., in July 1956.

His next post was as the United States representative to the Central Treaty Organization (CENTO) in Turkey, from 1959 until his retirement in 1962.

His decorations include the Distinguished Service Medal, Silver Star, Legion of Merit, Distinguished Flying Cross, Bronze Star Medal, Air Medal with two oak leaf clusters, Purple Heart, Presidential Unit Citation, and European Theater Medal with eight battle stars. His foreign decorations include the Officer of the Most Excellent Order of the British Empire, Croix de Guerre with Palm (French), Pilots Citation, Royal Yugoslavian Air Force, the Order of the White Elephant, 2nd Class (Thailand), the Ulchi Distinguished Military Service Medal with Gold Star (Republic of Korea), the Order of the Rising Sun (Japan), and the Military Order of Taeguk (Korea). These later two decorations are still subject to Congressional approval. He was rated a command pilot, combat and aircraft observer.

== Personal life ==
General Rogers was married twice. He had two daughters, Gloria and Judith, with his first wife, Dorothy, and the couple divorced.

Gloria married Gene Davies. They had seven daughters and three sons. The couple worked in real estate.

Judith was a member of the ballet company at the Metropolitan Opera House in New York City for several years before marrying Richard Hauser and having four daughters with him.

His second wife, Wilma Rebecca Hague, was a colonel in the Women's Army Corps. They were stationed together in Japan, where they met Kazuko Sawaji, who became their ward when their time in Japan was up. Later, when the couple retired and lived in Falls Church, Virginia, they put Kazuko through the interior design program at Marymount University. Kazuko later married Howard Barkey, a U.S. Army colonel who translated German transmissions into English during World War II. She was the caregiver of General Rogers and his wife in their final years.
